= Die Hard 2 =

1990 film by Renny Harlin

- Theatrical release poster
- Directed by: Renny Harlin
- Screenplay by: Steven E. de Souza; Doug Richardson
- Based on: 58 Minutes by Walter Wager; Characters by Roderick Thorp
- Produced by: Charles Gordon; Lawrence Gordon; Joel Silver
- Starring: Bruce Willis; Bonnie Bedelia; William Atherton; Reginald VelJohnson; Franco Nero; William Sadler; John Amos
- Cinematography: Oliver Wood
- Edited by: Stuart Baird; Robert A. Ferretti
- Music by: Michael Kamen
- Production companies: Gordon Company; Silver Pictures
- Distributed by: 20th Century Fox
- Release date: July 4, 1990
- Running time: 124 minutes
- Country: United States
- Language: English
- Budget: $60–70 million
- Box office: $240 million

Die Hard 2 (also known by its tagline Die Harder or Die Hard 2: Die Harder) (Note: The film's onscreen title is Die Hard 2, as also given at the initial home-video release's official website. The film's original advertising used "Die Harder" as a tagline, and many releases of the film (e.g. the 2006 DVD release and 2007 Blu-ray release) were marketed under the title Die Hard 2: Die Harder.) is a 1990 American action film directed by Renny Harlin, written by Steven E. de Souza and Doug Richardson, and co-produced by Joel Silver. The sequel to Die Hard (1988) and the second installment in the Die Hard film series, it stars Bruce Willis as John McClane. Bonnie Bedelia, William Atherton, and Reginald VelJohnson also reprise their supporting roles from the previous film while William Sadler, Art Evans, Franco Nero, Dennis Franz, Fred Thompson, and John Amos appear in new roles. The film was released on July 4, 1990 by 20th Century Fox, in the United States.

As with the first film, the action in Die Hard 2 takes place during Christmas, but on a non-specified day during Christmas week rather than on Christmas Eve. McClane is waiting for his wife Holly to land at Washington Dulles International Airport when terrorists take over the air traffic control system. He must stop the terrorists before Holly's plane and several other incoming flights that are circling the airport run out of fuel and crash. During the night, McClane must also contend with airport police and military commander Grant, none of whom want his assistance.

The film received positive reviews from critics, with praise for its action sequences and criticism for some plot elements; it was nevertheless generally considered to be inferior to its predecessor. Die Hard 2 was a major box-office success, grossing $240 million and doubling the earnings of its predecessor and finishing as the year's seventh-highest-grossing film. It demonstrated to the industry that the first film's scenario could be applied to different settings and still draw massive audiences, leading to many imitators outside of the series. This sequel was followed by Die Hard with a Vengeance (1995), Live Free or Die Hard (2007) and A Good Day to Die Hard (2013).

== Plot ==
On an unspecified day during Christmas week, two years after the events of the previous film, (Note: There is a deleted scene included with the DVD and Blu-ray versions of the film where McClane tells Marvin (Tom Bower), the janitor "This is how I spent Christmas last year", which seems to suggest that, given the release date of the first film, Die Hard 2 takes place during Christmas 1989. However, given the various references to the 1990s in the film (including the featured season one episode of The Simpsons, "There's No Disgrace Like Home", being released in 1990), and the scene in question having been removed, the film can be assumed to take place during Christmas 1990.) John McClane is now a lieutenant with the LAPD, who arrives at Dulles International Airport to pick up his wife, Holly. He is met with hostility from airport police officer Vito Lorenzo, who issues him a parking ticket. Meanwhile, a plane carrying corrupt foreign military leader General Ramon Esperanza is headed to Dulles under extradition for using U.S. funds to buy drugs.

Waiting to meet Esperanza's plane is disgraced former United States Army Colonel William Stuart and a group of ex-military sympathizers who supported Esperanza's actions. McClane follows two of Stuart's men into a baggage sorting area where a gun fight ensues. He kills one man, but the other escapes.

With the help of his friend Sergeant Al Powell, McClane runs the dead man's fingerprints. They correspond to an American soldier who was listed as having died in a helicopter accident two years earlier. McClane reports his concerns to the ill-tempered airport police chief Carmine Lorenzo and air traffic control director Ed Trudeau, but neither believes him.

Stuart and his men are operating out of a church on the outskirts of the airport. They cut all communications with incoming airplanes, disable runway lighting, and demand that Esperanza's plane be allowed to land without interference. Under Stuart's direction, Trudeau orders all planes in Dulles airspace held in the air despite their low fuel supplies.

McClane becomes worried about Holly's plane, so enlists the help of airport janitor Marvin to fight back. Chief airport engineer Leslie Barnes decides to try using an unfinished antenna array to communicate with the airplanes. Lorenzo sends an airport SWAT team with him, but Stuart's men kill the officers and destroy the antenna. McClane saves Barnes and kills Stuart's men. In retaliation, Stuart impersonates air traffic control and fakes a British airplane's altimeter reading by recalibrating sea level. McClane is unable to warn off the airplane which crashes, killing everyone aboard.

Esperanza's plane lands and McClane wounds Esperanza before Stuart and his men arrive. They blow up the plane and take Esperanza to the church. A Blue Light team arrives, led by Major Grant, of whom Stuart is a protégé. Grant's men and McClane attack the church.

McClane kills one of Stuart's men and gives chase with his gun, but the mercenaries escape on snowmobiles. McClane follows but his vehicle is destroyed by gunfire. McClane realizes the gun was filled with blanks; the earlier firefight was staged and Grant's team is working with Stuart. Grant, Stuart, their men and Esperanza rendezvous at an airport hangar, where a Boeing 747 is waiting for them.

On Holly's flight, reporter Richard Thornburg becomes suspicious as to why the plane has not landed. He taps into the cockpit communications and records a transmission from Barnes to all the circling airplanes describing the situation. From the airplane's lavatory, Richard broadcasts the recording, leading to a panic in the airport terminal which prevents McClane and Lorenzo from getting to the 747. Holly subdues Thornburg with a fellow passenger's taser.

McClane asks reporter Samantha Coleman's crew to fly him via helicopter to intercept the 747. McClane jumps onto the wing and uses his coat to jam the aileron, preventing the plane from taking off. During a melee, McClane kicks Grant into a jet engine. While fighting Stuart, McClane opens a fuel valve in the engine pylon just as Stuart kicks him off the wing. McClane uses a cigarette lighter to ignite the fuel trail, causing the plane to explode and killing everyone on board. The fire trail serves as a landing guide for the circling aircraft to land safely.

McClane and Holly are reunited. Marvin picks them up in his airport cart just as Lorenzo turns up asking if McClane got a parking ticket outside his airport. Lorenzo rips up the ticket and says "What the hell, it's Christmas!" Marvin drives McClane and Holly away.

== Cast ==
- Bruce Willis as LAPD Detective Lieutenant John McClane
- Bonnie Bedelia as Holly Gennero McClane
- William Atherton as Richard "Dick" Thornburg
- Reginald VelJohnson as LAPD Sergeant Al Powell
- Franco Nero as General Ramon Esperanza
- William Sadler as United States Army Colonel William Stuart
- John Amos as Major Grant
- Dennis Franz as Airport Police Captain Carmine Lorenzo
- Art Evans as Leslie Barnes, airport chief engineer
- Fred Thompson as Ed Trudeau, air traffic flight director
- Tom Bower as Marvin, airport janitor
- Sheila McCarthy as Samantha "Sam" Coleman
- Robert Costanzo as Dulles International Airport Police Sergeant Vito Lorenzo
- Colm Meaney as Windsor Pilot
- James Lancaster as Windsor Navigator

Additional cast members include Colonel Stuart's hitmen: Don Harvey as Garber, John Costelloe as Sergeant Oswald Cochrane, Vondie Curtis-Hall as Miller, John Leguizamo as Burke, Robert Patrick as O'Reilly, Tom Verica as Kahn, Tony Ganios as Baker, Michael Cunningham as Sheldon, Peter Nelson as Thompson, Ken Baldwin as Mulkey and Mark Boone Junior as Shockley. Patrick O'Neal appears as Telford, Major Grant's radio operator.

== Production ==
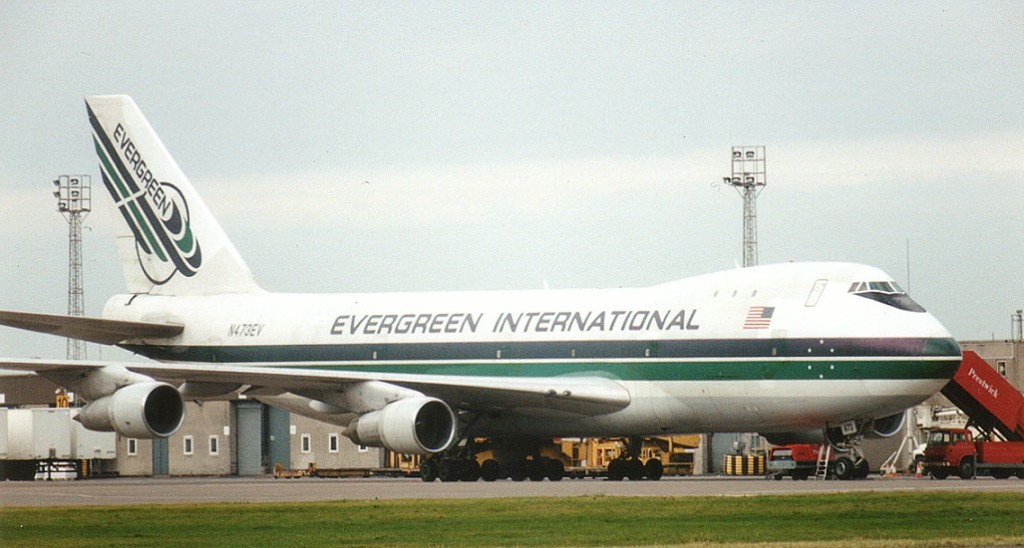
Evergreen Boeing 747 (registration N473EV) used in the film

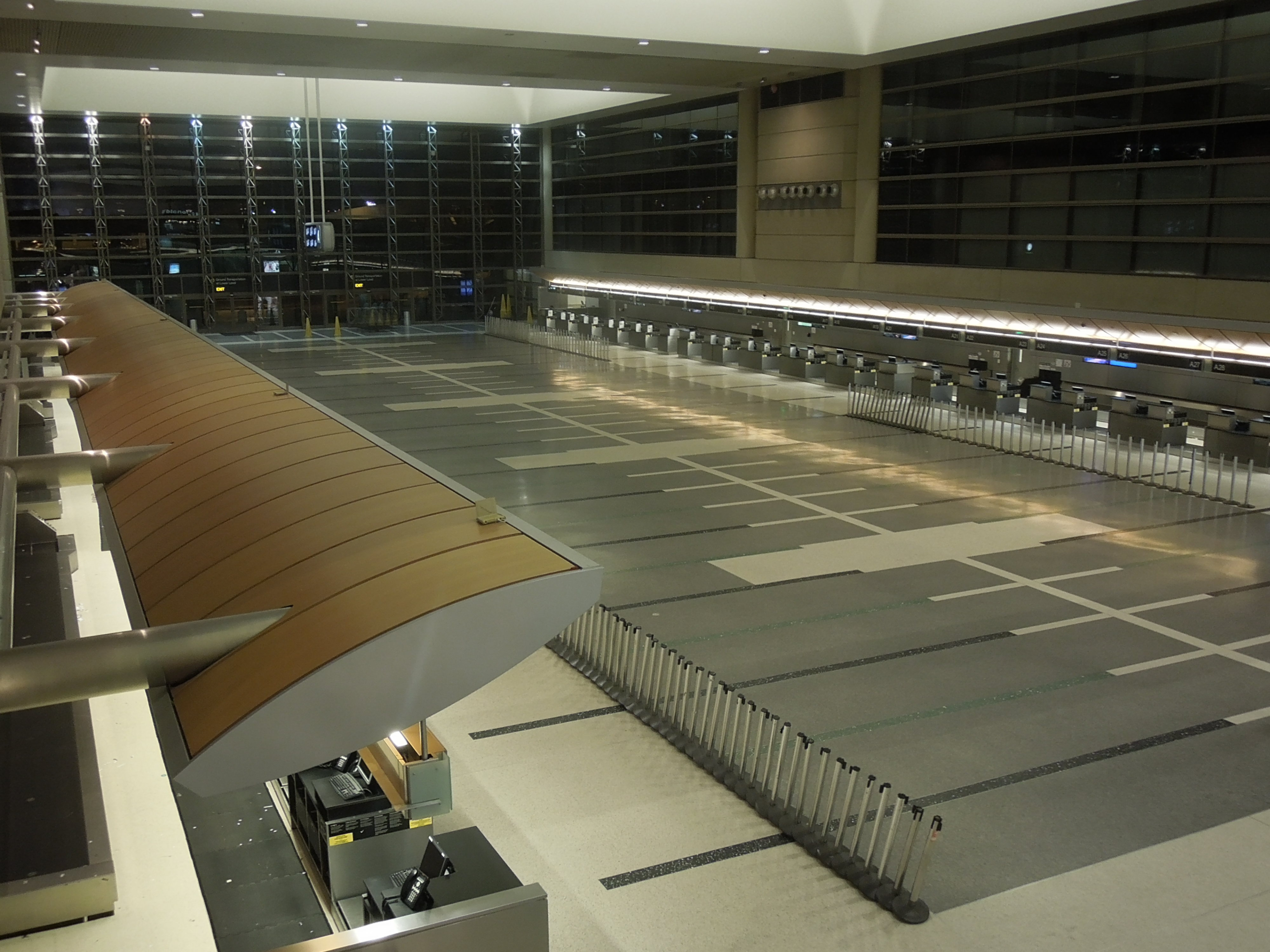
Filming of the Dulles airport concourse scenes took place in the Tom Bradley International Terminal at LAX.

The screenplay was adapted from Walter Wager's 1987 novel 58 Minutes. The novel has the same plot but differs slightly: police officer Frank Malone must stop terrorists who take an airport hostage while his daughter Kate's plane circles overhead, and has 58 minutes to do so before the plane crashes. Roderick Thorp, who wrote the 1979 novel Nothing Lasts Forever, upon which Die Hard was based, receives credit for creating "certain original characters", although his name is misspelled onscreen as "Roderick Thorpe".

One of the writers of the screenplay, Steven E. de Souza, later admitted in an interview for the book Action Speaks Louder: Violence, Spectacle, and the American Action Movie that the villains were based on America's Central American meddling, primarily the Iran–Contra affair.

The film was originally budgeted at $40 million. Bruce Willis was paid $7.5 million for reprising his role for the film. Producer Joel Silver was accused of profligate spending and it was claimed the film cost $60–70 million. Fox domestic distribution president Tom Sherak dismissed the $70 million claim as "absurd". It was reported at the end of filming that Silver had been relieved of day-to-day producing duties.

Scenes of Dulles International Airport in the snow were to be filmed in Denver but filming was scrapped due to warm weather. Some outdoor scenes were filmed in Alpena, Michigan, while others needing to accommodate the landing of the 747 with snow were filmed at former Kincheloe Air Force Base in Kincheloe, Michigan. Other scenes were filmed on a soundstage in Los Angeles using fake snow.

Die Hard 2 was the first film to use digitally composited live-action footage with a traditional matte painting that had been photographed and scanned into a computer. It was used for the last scene, which took place on a runway.

According to Franco Nero, Silver got the idea to cast him after he saw movie posters of Nero hanging in the office of their mutual accountant. Nero did not want to do Die Hard 2 because he did not like the script and he had committed to do the film Breath of Life. Finally, Silver scheduled Nero's scenes in such a way that the actor could do both films.

== Release ==
=== Marketing ===
In a trailer for the film screened during Christmas 1989, the film had a planned release date of June 29, 1990. This was brought forward to June 22; however, following claims of the film running over time and budget, the release date was pushed back two weeks to July 4.

=== Home media ===
The film debuted on video in the United States on January 31, 1991, and it was the most rented video in its first week above Navy SEALs and sold a record 505,000 units for rental.

The film became available on DVD on March 9, 1999, followed by a 2-Disc Special Edition DVD on July 10, 2001, as part of the Die Hard Ultimate Collection DVD and re-released again in early 2005 as a Widescreen Edition and June 19, 2007, followed by a Blu-ray release on November 20, 2007, and a re-release on January 29, 2013.

=== Video game ===
Die Hard 2: Die Harder is a 1992 side-scrolling first-person rail shooter video game developed by Tiertex and published by Grandslam Video for the Amiga, Atari ST, Commodore 64, and MS-DOS. The game uses the movie's plot, in which John McClane shoots terrorists invading Washington's Dulles Airport in areas such as the luggage center and a runway, chasing after enemies on a snowmobile, and finally on the wing of the terrorists' plane. Each stage consists of three screens; on the last one, each with a boss, John must fight. Occasionally, he must also avoid killing civilians crossing each level. Some enemies, when killed, drop power-ups such as med-kits, armor, grenades and weapons that are collected by shooting them. A game over occurs when John has exhausted all of his lives and continues; the game then resets to the main menu.

== Reception ==
=== Box office ===
Die Hard 2 exceeded all expectations by outdoing the box-office success of its predecessor Die Hard. The film had the largest pre-opening, earning $3.7 million from 1,828 theaters. For six years, it held this record until it was surpassed by Independence Day in 1996. It had a wide release in 2,507 theaters in the United States and Canada, grossing $21.7 million its opening weekend. Die Hard 2 grossed $117.5 million in the United States and Canada, and $122.5 million internationally, earning over $240 million worldwide, almost doubling that of Die Hard. The film was re-released internationally in 1993 and made $216,339 more, which totaled its gross to $240.2 million. During a period of time, Die Hard 2 and Ghost, starring Die Hard 2 star Bruce Willis' then-wife Demi Moore, occupied the number one and number two spots at the box office, a feat that was not accomplished again by a married Hollywood couple until Ryan Reynolds and Blake Lively with Deadpool & Wolverine and It Ends with Us in 2024.

=== Critical response ===
On Rotten Tomatoes, Die Hard 2 has an approval rating of 68% based on 68 reviews, with an average rating of 6.3/10. The site's critical consensus reads: "It lacks the fresh thrills of its predecessor, but Die Hard 2 still works as an over-the-top – and reasonably taut – big-budget sequel, with plenty of set pieces to paper over the plot deficiencies." On Metacritic, the film has a weighted average score of 67 out of 100, based on 17 critics, indicating "generally favorable" reviews. Audiences polled by CinemaScore gave the film an average grade of "A" on an A+ to F scale.

Roger Ebert, who gave the original film a mixed review, described the sequel as "terrific entertainment", despite noting substantial credibility problems with the plot. Jay Boyar of the Orlando Sentinel dubbed the film as being as disappointing a sequel as Another 48 Hrs. and RoboCop 2, and said,

Whatever small pleasure there is to be found in this loud dud is due mostly to the residual good feelings from the first film... As played by Bruce Willis, McClane is still an engaging character, even if he is much less amusingly drawn this time. Willis is in there trying, but the qualities that helped to make his character sympathetic in the first film are missing. McClane no longer worries openly about his personal safety, as he did in the original movie. His quasi-cowboy personality from Die Hard is all but forgotten – he has become more of a Rambo and less of a Roy Rogers. And though the filmmakers try to establish McClane as resistant to advanced technology, this promising idea isn't developed.

Empire magazine rated the film three out of five stars, while stating, "It's entertaining nonsense that doesn't quite manage to recapture the magic of the original. Still, there are some nice moments here, and Willis is on solid ground as the iconic McClane." Gene Siskel ranked the film as the sixth best movie of 1990. Maxim magazine ranked the film's plane crash #2 on its list of "Greatest Movie Plane Crashes".
