= 58 Minutes =

1987 thriller novel by Walter Wager

- Cover of the Open Road Integrated Media ebook version
- Author: Walter Wager
- Cover artist: Graymalkin Media
- Language: English
- Genre: Thriller novel
- Publisher: Graymalkin Media
- Publication date: 1987
- Publication place: United States
- Media type: Print
- ISBN: 9781935169031

58 Minutes is a 1987 thriller novel by American novelist Walter Wager. The novel was the basis for the 1990 film Die Hard 2.

== Plot ==
Frank Malone is a divorced NYPD captain who is waiting at JFK International Airport in New York City for his young daughter to arrive from California as he is going to spend Christmas with her. Unfortunately, a mysterious man known only as "Number 1" calls the control tower and tells the crew of the airport that he has cut the power to the runway lights of JFK and every airport in the vicinity and has hijacked their equipment, leaving them with only 58 minutes to meet their demands until the first plane, which carries Frank's daughter, runs out of fuel and crashes. With a massive blizzard coming in, the planes have nowhere else to go. Frank must jump into action and save his daughter and the passengers of the other planes, which are all circling overhead, in 58 minutes.

== See also ==
- Die Hard 2
- Roderick Thorp
- Nothing Lasts Forever
