= The Detective (1968 film) =

1968 crime film starring Frank Sinatra

- Theatrical release poster
- Directed by: Gordon Douglas
- Screenplay by: Abby Mann
- Based on: The Detective; 1966 novel by Roderick Thorp
- Produced by: Aaron Rosenberg
- Starring: Frank Sinatra; Lee Remick; Ralph Meeker; Jack Klugman; Lloyd Bochner; William Windom; Tony Musante; Al Freeman, Jr.; Robert Duvall; Jacqueline Bisset
- Cinematography: Joseph Biroc
- Edited by: Robert Simpson
- Music by: Jerry Goldsmith
- Production company: Arcola Pictures Corporation
- Distributed by: 20th Century Fox
- Release date: May 28, 1968
- Running time: 114 minutes
- Country: United States
- Language: English
- Budget: $4.5 million
- Box office: $6.5 million (rentals)

The Detective is a 1968 American neo-noir crime drama film starring Frank Sinatra. Directed by Gordon Douglas and produced by Aaron Rosenberg, it is based on the 1966 novel of the same name by Roderick Thorp.

Co-stars include Lee Remick, Jacqueline Bisset, Jack Klugman, William Windom, and Robert Duvall, with a script by Academy Award-winning screenwriter Abby Mann. The book's rights were owned by Robert Evans, who was to produce the film but never got a chance to when Evans was hired by Gulf+Western to run Paramount Pictures.

The Detective was hailed by critics as a more "adult" approach to depicting the life and work of a police detective and previously taboo subjects such as homosexuality. The detective in question is Joe Leland, who is trying to juggle marital issues with a murder case that seemed to be open-and-shut at first but runs much deeper than he could have imagined.

The Detective was Sinatra's fourth collaboration with director Douglas, having worked together on Young at Heart (1954), Robin and the 7 Hoods (1964), Tony Rome (1967), and then later Lady in Cement (1968).

== Plot ==
New York City police detective Joe Leland is called to the home of a murder victim who has been beaten to death, head crushed, and has had his penis removed. Puzzled and disgusted, the police on call are left bemused, and Leland holds things together with his direct, no-nonsense approach.

Few leads are found, other than the fact that a housemate of the victim remains conspicuous by his absence. All the while notions about the victim's sexuality and personal interests warp the ideals of the officers assigned to the task. Leland tries to remain focused on the case while dealing with the breakdown of his marriage to wife Karen.

Eventually, the victim's housemate is identified as Felix Tesla, and he is soon tracked down by Leland and another detective. Leland makes a psychologically disturbed Tesla crack and coaxes a confession out of him. This results in extensive publicity, a promotion for Leland, and the electric chair for Tesla, which distresses Leland because it is clear to him that Tesla is insane.

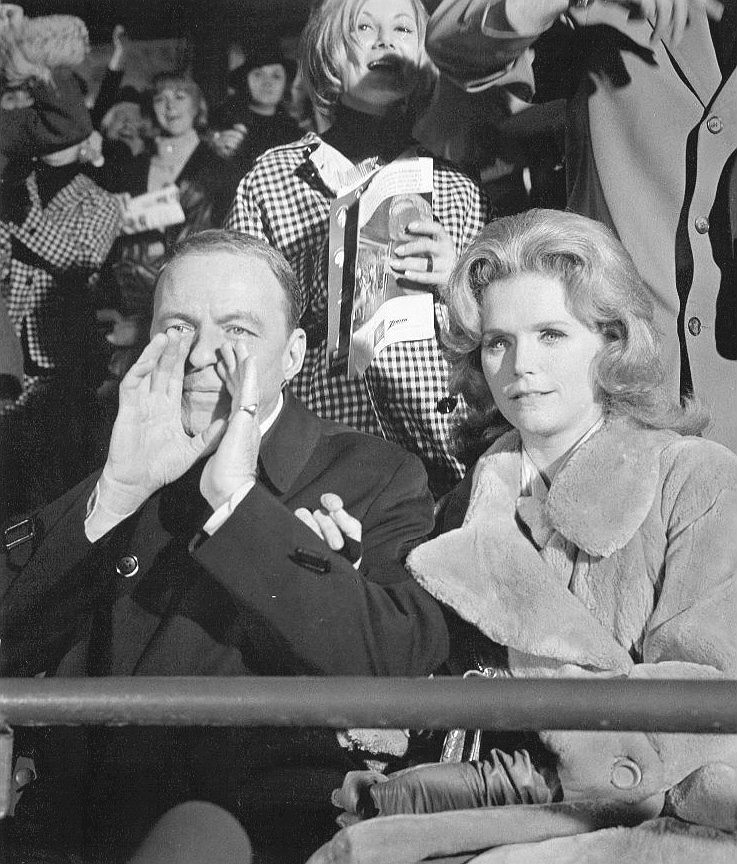
Joe (Frank Sinatra) and Karen (Lee Remick) watching a New York Giants v. Green Bay Packers game at Yankee Stadium. The scene involved Karen's marriage proposal to Joe and was part of a flashback.

Later, across town, a man kills himself by jumping from the rooftop of the Garden State Park Racetrack grandstand. The case goes unnoticed until the much-younger wife of the dead man, Norma MacIver, comes to Leland's office and asks him to look into it, believing something far more complex is involved.

Leland and partner Dave Schoenstein follow leads. A psychiatrist, Dr. Roberts, clearly knows more about the dead man, Colin MacIver, than he is willing to reveal. The therapist is also familiar with Karen Leland, whose infidelity is putting a great strain on the detective's home life and distracting him from his work.

Leland soon learns that certain powerful interests in the city do not want him to ask questions about their scheme to inflate the value of real estate. Leland discovers that MacIver is at the center of the scheme. The incorruptible detective presses on, at risk to his career and life, as he discovers a lurid relationship between the man's suicide and the previous murder. MacIver had met the victim after going to a gay club to "get [homosexuality] out of my system." MacIver then proceeded to murder him following the victim's remarks about being able to recognize MacIver as a homosexual.

MacIver made a taped confession to Dr. Roberts in which he also explains that he used the doctor's name as a front in his real estate scheme. Roberts insists that Leland keep MacIver's confession secret to preserve the detective's professional reputation as well as the powerful interests who do not want their crimes exposed. The film ends after Leland has revealed the truth and is happy to let the chips fall where they may, having unburdened himself of his guilt over Tesla's wrongful execution.

== Cast ==
- Frank Sinatra as Det. Sgt. Joe Leland
- Lee Remick as Karen Wagner Leland
- Jacqueline Bisset as Norma MacIver
- Ralph Meeker as Det. Curran
- Jack Klugman as Det. Dave Schoenstein
- Horace McMahon as Capt. Tom Farrell
- Lloyd Bochner as Dr. Wendell Roberts
- William Windom as Colin MacIver
- Tony Musante as Felix Tesla
- Al Freeman, Jr. as Det. Robbie Loughlin
- Robert Duvall as Det. Nestor
- Pat Henry as Mercidis
- Patrick McVey as Officer Mike Tanner
- Dixie Marquis as Carol Linjack
- Sugar Ray Robinson as Kelly
- Renée Taylor as Rachael Schoenstein
- James Inman as Teddy Leikman
- Tom Atkins as Officer Jack Harmon
- George Plimpton as reporter in squad room
- Joe Santos as reporter in squad room [uncredited]
- Bette Midler as Girl at Party [uncredited]

=== Casting ===
Sinatra originally planned to have his then-wife Mia Farrow cast as Norma MacIver, a role that was eventually taken by Jacqueline Bisset after Farrow was kept beyond the previously scheduled end of filming for Rosemary's Baby. This was the last straw for Sinatra, who had the divorce papers publicly served on Farrow on her film's set. Their divorce became final in August 1968, putting an end to a short-lived romance of barely two years.

== Release and critical reception ==
=== Box office ===
Released on May 28, 1968, The Detective was a box office success, becoming the 20th highest earning film of the year with $6.5 million taken in box office rentals against its $4.49 million budget. According to Fox records, the film required $8.8 million in rentals to break even. By 11 December 1970, it had made $10.2 million, therefore making a profit for the studio.

=== Critical ===
Critical reception was mostly positive, with Sinatra receiving praise for delivering one of his most intense and dedicated acting performances. The Hollywood Reporter commented: "Sinatra has honed his laconic, hep veneer to the point of maximum credibility." Roger Ebert praised his performance and the concept of the film, stating: "It is pretty clear that Sinatra wanted 'The Detective' to be as good a movie as he could manage. It provides a clear, unsentimental look at a police investigation, and even the language reflects the way cops (and the rest of us) talk." Vito Russo, activist and film historian, examined the film in The Celluloid Closet: "In late 1967, screenwriter Abby Mann told The New York Times that 'it's easier to be accepted in our society as a murderer than as a homosexual,' and his next screenplay, for Gordon Douglas' The Detective, had its roots in this observation. The film, set almost exclusively in the gay haunts of New York City ... "

Vincent Canby of The New York Times thought that the Thorp novel on which the film is based "had all the literary grace of a mile-long comic strip without pictures." As for the movie, he wrote, "Although it makes some valid comments about contemporary society, it exploits its lurid subject matter in a show-offy, heavy-handed way designed as much to tease as to teach compassion." He praised it for being "a film of transition. It deals with subject matter available to the new Hollywood in a style that reflects the old." Pauline Kael wrote, "Homosexuality, police corruption, and race relations are exploited in the moralistic "outspoken" style of the screenwriter Abby Mann ... " Leonard Maltin gave the film three of four stars: "Trashy script ... pits cops against homosexuals; more than redeemed by fast, no-nonsense direction, good acting, particularly Sinatra and Freeman."

The Detective was released on DVD by 20th Century Fox in 2005 as part of a boxed set that included Tony Rome and Lady in Cement.

== Legacy ==
In 1979, Roderick Thorp wrote a sequel to The Detective called Nothing Lasts Forever, in which Leland is trapped in a skyscraper after it is taken by German terrorists and must rescue his daughter and grandchildren. The novel was adapted into the 1988 20th Century Fox film Die Hard, in which Joe Leland's name was changed to John McClane and the object of his heroism was changed from his daughter to his wife. Coincidentally, Lloyd Bochner's son Hart was also featured in Die Hard, as was Jacqueline Bisset's then-partner, Alexander Godunov. The film launched a film franchise that ran until 2013. As Die Hard was based on the novel sequel to the film adaptation of The Detective, Fox was contractually obliged to offer Sinatra the role. Sinatra, who was 70 at the time, declined, with the role ultimately going to Bruce Willis.

== See also ==
- List of American films of 1968
