= Telefon (film) =

1977 spy film

- Theatrical release poster
- Directed by: Don Siegel
- Screenplay by: Peter Hyams; Stirling Silliphant
- Based on: Telefon; 1975 novel by Walter Wager
- Produced by: James B. Harris
- Starring: Charles Bronson; Lee Remick; Tyne Daly; Alan Badel; Patrick Magee; Donald Pleasence
- Cinematography: Michael Butler
- Edited by: Douglas Stewart
- Music by: Lalo Schifrin
- Production company: Metro-Goldwyn-Mayer
- Distributed by: United Artists (United States/Canada); Cinema International Corporation (International)
- Release date: December 16, 1977 (U.S.)
- Running time: 103 minutes
- Country: United States
- Language: English

Telefon is a 1977 spy film directed by Don Siegel and starring Charles Bronson, Lee Remick and Donald Pleasence. The screenplay by Peter Hyams and Stirling Silliphant is based on the 1975 novel by Walter Wager.

== Plot ==
After the Cuban Missile Crisis, the Soviet Union planted a number of long-term, deep-cover sleeper agents all over the United States, who were so thoroughly brainwashed that even they did not know they were agents. They can be activated only by a special code phrase, a line from the Robert Frost poem "Stopping by Woods on a Snowy Evening" – followed by the agent's real first name. Their mission was to sabotage crucial parts of the civil and military infrastructure in the event of war.

Years later, Nikolai Dalchimsky, a rogue KGB headquarters clerk, travels to America and takes with him the Telefon Book, which contains the names, addresses and telephone numbers of all the sleeper agents. He starts activating them, one by one. American counterintelligence is thrown into confusion when seemingly-ordinary citizens start blowing up facilities that were once important but now have little, if any, value. The agents either commit suicide or die in the act itself.

The KGB does not dare tell its political leaders, much less the Americans, about its negligence in not deactivating the spy network. KGB Major Grigori Borzov, who was selected in part for his photographic memory, memorizes the contents of the only other copy of the Telefon Book and is sent to find and stop Dalchimsky quietly, before either side learns what is happening and possibly starts a war. Borzov is given the assistance of only a single agent, Barbara, who had been planted in America years before.

Eventually, Borzov realizes the method behind Dalchimsky's pattern of attacks: he has chosen the agents by the first letters of their American hometowns by "writing" his own name in sabotage across America. Borzov thus anticipates Dalchimsky's next chosen agent and kills Dalchimsky.

However, there are a number of twists. Barbara has orders from the KGB to assassinate Borzov once he succeeds to get rid of a dangerous loose end. In addition, she is a double agent and actually works for America. When she informs her American superior, Sandburg, he also tells her to kill Borzov so that she will retain the confidence of the KGB. However, Barbara has fallen in love with her would-be target. She informs Borzov, and together, they blackmail both sides into leaving them alone by holding the threat of the remaining Telefon agents over their heads.

== Cast ==
- Charles Bronson as Major Grigori Borzov
- Lee Remick as Barbara
- Donald Pleasence as Nikolai Dalchimsky
- Tyne Daly as Dorothy Putterman
- Alan Badel as Colonel Malchenko
- Patrick Magee as General Strelsky
- Sheree North as Marie Wills
- Frank Marth as Harley Sandburg
- Helen Page Camp as Emma Stark
- Roy Jenson as Doug Stark
- Jacqueline Scott as Mrs. Hassler
- Ed Bakey as Carl Hassler
- John Mitchum as Harry Bascom
- Iggie Wolfington as Father Stuart Diller
- Hank Brandt as William Enders
- John Carter as Stroller
- Burton Gilliam as Gas Station Attendant
- Regis Cordic as Doctor
- Carmen Zapata as Nurse
- Kathleen O'Malley as Mrs. Maloney
- Åke Lindman as Lieutenant Alexandrov
- Ansa Ikonen as Dalchimsky's Mother
- George O. Petrie as Hotel Receptionist
- Robert Phillips as 1st Highway Patrolman
- Cliff Emmich as 2nd Highway Patrolman
- Ville-Veikko Salminen as Russian Steward
- James Nolan as Appliance Store Clerk
- Derek Rydall as Mrs. Wills' Child
- Michael Byrne as Soviet Military Officer (uncredited)

== Production ==
=== Development ===
MGM bought the film rights to the novel in October 1974. The novel was published in April 1975. The New York Times called the novel "a doozie of a thriller".

Peter Bellwood was the first writer. Then Peter Hyams wrote a script. Hyams says Dan Melnick then head of MGM told him he wanted Hyams to write and direct, but his last film Peeper had flopped and Hyams said "he knew there was no way he was going to let me direct it." They did like the script but brought in Richard Lester to direct. Hyams rewrote the script for Lester, who then left the project and Don Siegel came on board. Hyams would leave to make Capricorn One and Stirling Silliphant rewrote the script.

In August 1976 it was announced Don Siegel would direct and Charles Bronson would star. Siegel had directed Bronson in TV in the late 50s and said "I wanted to do this one because of Bronson. I think we would make a natural team."

Bronson's wife Jill Ireland often worked with her husband and Bronson said the female lead was "perfect for her" but he did not insist and Lee Remick was cast instead.

Martin Elfand was originally producer of the film but in November 1976 was named executive vice president in charge of production at Warner Bros. and James B. Harris took over producing, with Elfand being credited as executive producer.

=== Filming ===
Principal photography began in January 1977.

Some of the film was shot in Helsinki, Finland, which doubled for Russia. A magazine in the Soviet Union ran an article critical of the film, claiming it aimed to stir up trouble and demonised the Russians. Don Siegel denied this saying the film was "pro Russia and pro peace."

"I have to face the fact the story is cockamamie at best," said Siegel. "So I've been particularly painstaking to give the movie a feeling of authenticity."

The city skyline depicting Houston, where part of the story line occurred, is actually that of Great Falls, Montana, where the majority of the film was shot. During filming, the crew had to order two truckloads of snow needed for one of the scenes, because the chinook winds in the area took away the snow they had. They were trucked from the mountains. Filming in downtown Great Falls was also included. The exploding building in one scene is actually the controlled demolition of the old Paris Gibson Junior High School. The explosion scene was filmed on February 20, 1977. The present day Paris Gibson square was undamaged, but the explosion started roof fires on a couple of nearby houses that were quickly extinguished by city firefighters hired by the movie company on stand by.

The Houston scenes were shot on a Hollywood backlot, while the interior of the Houston Hyatt Regency was portrayed by 5 Embarcadero Center in San Francisco, California – the location which was also used in The Towering Inferno.

The scenes with fires and explosions at a rocket engine test site were filmed at Rocketdyne's Santa Susana Field Laboratory in the mountains northwest of Los Angeles.

According to director Siegel, actress Lee Remick was terrified of Charles Bronson, and when asked to touch his face during a scene, responded, "I don't dare. He'll bite me!"

As parts of the film were shot in Finland, there are several cameo appearances by Finnish movie stars, most notably Ansa Ikonen.

== Reception ==
=== Critical response ===
Vincent Canby of The New York Times wrote, "Though there are action sequences in 'Telefon,' they are never sustained, and the screenplay only occasionally comes up with witty substitutes for the missing plausibility. However, to describe 'Telefon' as synthetic is to take it more seriously than it's taken by anyone connected with it." Arthur D. Murphy of Variety called the film "pleasant escapism" with a story that "runs its interesting if predictable course until fadeout romantic clinch as the stars tell their respective employers to let them live in peace somewhere nice and idyllic, which by this time is really asking too much of audiences." Gene Siskel of the Chicago Tribune gave the film 3 stars out of 4 and wrote that it "is by no means a great picture — just solid action held together by a string of explosions. In other words, it's a good movie to eat popcorn by." Kevin Thomas of the Los Angeles Times called the film "a sleek diversion that hasn't much more to it than a routine TV movie." Gary Arnold of The Washington Post stated, "The real problem is that the filmmakers lay out this story blueprint so doggedly that the audience is invariably 25 pages of expository chitchat ahead of them. Following 'Telefon' is about as thrilling as being kept on hold for the better part of the day." Richard Combs of The Monthly Film Bulletin wrote, "This dismal attempt to ring some changes in the spy genre—the protagonist is a KGB agent, his mission is to preserve East-West cordiality—is fatally undercut both by its surprisingly lukewarm plot and unengaged characters and by the fact that its updating is already out of date, Russian-American détente having sprung many leaks." James Monaco wrote that Telefon don't do much but play with paranoia.

"It was a typical Siegel film," Siegel said later. "It made absolutely no sense. I did the film because basically I'm a whore."

The film holds a score of 44% on Rotten Tomatoes based on 18 reviews.

Quentin Tarantino later wrote that "just because the premise is nutty doesn’t mean it’s bad. In fact, it’s far out enough that in the right hands, it could have been a stone gas. But those right hands definitely didn’t belong to old fart Siegel, who blew the picture’s chance for success by de-emphasizing the kooky elements and emphasizing the dull ones. Siegel not only wasted his time, he wasted the Stirling Silliphant and Peter Hyams (who should have directed) script."

== See also ==
- The Naked Gun: From the Files of Police Squad!, a comedy film whose plot borrows heavily from Telefon.
- Conspiracy thriller

== Notes ==
- Bettencourt, Scott. "Telefon" (PDF). Film Score Monthly.
