= Walter Wager =

American novelist

- Walter Wager
- Born: Walter Herman Wager; September 4, 1924; The Bronx, New York City, United States
- Died: July 11, 2004 (aged 79); Manhattan, New York, United States
- Education: Columbia University (BA); Harvard Law School (JD); Northwestern Law School (LLM)
- Occupation: Writer
- Spouse(s): Sylvia Leonard Wager (divorced; one child); Winifred McIvor Wager, married 1975 - July 11, 2004 (his death)
- Writing career
- Pen name: John Tiger; Walter Hermann; Lee Davis Willoughby

Walter Herman Wager (September 4, 1924 – July 11, 2004) was an American crime and espionage-thriller novelist and former editor-in-chief of Playbill magazine. The movie Telefon, starring Charles Bronson, was inspired by his novel of the same name. His book 58 Minutes was adapted into Die Hard 2, starring Bruce Willis.

== Education and career ==
Walter Wager was born in The Bronx, New York City, the son of a doctor and a nurse who had emigrated from the Russian Empire. A 1944 graduate of Columbia College, where he was a member of the Philolexian Society, he went on to a Harvard Law School degree three years later. Passing the bar exams but choosing not to practice, he went on to receive a master's degree in aviation law from Chicago's Northwestern University in 1949, while also serving as an editor of the Journal of Air Law and Commerce, then based in that city.

Afterward, he spent a year at the Sorbonne, in Paris, as a Fulbright Fellow. He spent a year in Israel as an aviation-law consultant for the Israeli Department of Civil Aviation, helping to negotiate a treaty on air space and working out of Lydda Airport in Tel Aviv. In 1952, he returned to New York City, where he worked for the United Nations, editing documents.

Shortly afterward, Wager segued into writing and producing radio and television documentaries for CBS and NBC, and the United States Information Agency, while also beginning a side career as a freelance writer for magazines including Playbill and Show. Under the pseudonym John Tiger, he wrote the paperback original Death Hits the Jackpot (Avon #605) for Avon Books, the fifth publisher he contacted; published in 1954, it paid him $3,000. He recalled in 2000, "I had a friend at a paperback publishing house. I like mystery stories so I thought I could sell this kind of prose." For several years he worked as a freelance writer.

Two years later, he published a second Avon paperback, Operation Intrigue, under the name Walter Herman. From 1963 to 1996, Wager was editor-in-chief of Playbill magazine, and from 1966 to 1978 as editor of ASCAP Today, the magazine of the music-licensing organization the American Society of Composers, Authors and Publishers; he later became ASCAP's public-relations director. He held a similar position at the University of Bridgeport in Connecticut in the early 1990s, until his retirement in 1993. He also did public relations for organizations including the Juilliard School, the Mann Music Center, and the Eugene O'Neill Theatre Center.

Wager was a member of the board of directors of the Mystery Writers of America, and its secretary beginning in 2001.

== Personal life ==
Wager married Sylvia Leonard (d. 1989), a fellow American student he met at the Sorbonne, in 1951 in Paris. The two had a daughter, Lisa, before the marriage ended in divorce. He married second wife Winifred McIvor Wage in 1975.

A resident of Manhattan's Upper West Side, he died of complications of brain cancer in 2004, at the assisted-living facility Amsterdam House in Manhattan.

== Books ==
Wager was best known as an author of crime and espionage thrillers. His novel Viper Three (Macmillan, 1971) was released as Twilight's Last Gleaming, with Burt Lancaster and Richard Widmark, in 1977. That same year, his spy novel Telefon (Macmillan, 1975) was adapted as the same-name movie starring Charles Bronson and Lee Remick. Wager's airport-based thriller 58 Minutes (1987) became the basis for the 1990 action film Die Hard 2, starring Bruce Willis. Additionally, Wager wrote a number of original novels in the 1960s under the pseudonym "John Tiger" that were based on the TV series I Spy and Mission: Impossible. He also wrote the farce My Side, by King Kong as Told to Walter Wager, published by Macmillan in 1976.

His series Blue Leader, Blue Moon, and Blue Murder featured tough Beverly Hills private detective Alison Gordon. As one of several writers using the pseudonym Lee Davis Willoughby, Wager also wrote the historical novels The Wildcatters and The Caribbeans.

== Bibliography ==
- Death Hits the Jackpot (1954; as John Tiger)
- The Pentagon's Favorite Magicians (1954; as John Tiger. Not published until 2014 by request of United States Department of Defense)
- Operation Intrigue (1956; as Walter Herman)
- I Spy (1965; as John Tiger)
- I Spy #2: Masterstroke (1966; as John Tiger)
- I Spy #3: Superkill (1967; as John Tiger)
- I Spy #4: Wipeout (1967; as John Tiger)
- I Spy #5: Countertrap (1967; as John Tiger)
- I Spy #6: Doomdate (1967; as John Tiger)
- Mission: Impossible (1967; as John Tiger)
- The Playwrights Speak (interviews with Tennessee Williams, Harold Pinter, Arnold Wesker, Arthur Miller, John Osborne; 1967)
- I Spy #7: Death-Twist (1968; as John Tiger)
- Mission: Impossible #4: Code Name Little Ivan (1969; as John Tiger)
- Sledgehammer (1970)
- Warhead (1971)
- Viper Three (1972), adapted for film as Twilight's Last Gleaming (1977)
- Swap (1973)
- Telefon (1975), adapted for film as Telefon (1977)
- Time of Reckoning (1977)
- Blue Leader (1979)
- Blue Moon (1981)
- The Wildcatters (The Making of America, Book 21) (Dell Publishing; as Lee Davis Willoughby; 1981)
- Blue Murder (1982)
- Designated Hitter (1982)
- The Caribbeans (Dell Publishing; as Lee Davis Willoughby; 1983)
- Otto's Boy (1985)
- Raw Deal, novelization of the Arnold Schwarzenegger film (1986)
- 58 Minutes (1987), adapted for film as Die Hard 2 (1990)
- The Spirit Team (1996)
- Tunnel (2001)
- Kelly's People (2002)
