= The Detective (novel) =

1966 novel by Roderick Thorp

- 1986 cover art
- Author: Roderick Thorp
- Language: English
- Genre: Thriller, detective
- Publisher: Dial Press (1st Edition)
- Publication date: 1966
- Publication place: United States
- Media type: Print (hardback & paperback)
- Pages: 598 pp
- ISBN: 0-8488-0375-2
- Followed by: Nothing Lasts Forever

The Detective is a thriller/detective novel by American author Roderick Thorp, first published hardcover in 1966. It was made into the 1968 movie of the same name, starring Frank Sinatra, as Detective Joe Leland. Billed as "an adult look at police life", The Detective went on to become one of the highest-grossing films of 1968 and one of the strongest box-office hits of Sinatra's acting career.

A sequel, Nothing Lasts Forever, was published in 1979, and was later adapted into the film Die Hard. Both books utilize the third-person narrative in their storytelling, and rely on a wealth of introspective monologuing.

== Plot summary ==
Joe Leland, a private detective, begins investigating a case for the recently widowed Norma MacIver. Norma requests that Leland find out everything he can about her deceased husband. Norma requests Leland personally because her husband had mentioned knowing him in the past.

It turns out that Leland and Colin MacIver served in the same military unit during World War II, but at different times. Leland interviews Colin's first wife, Colin's mother, and the security guards at the track where Colin supposedly killed himself.

Norma introduces Leland to her neighbor and former therapist, Dr. Wendell Roberts. During their conversation, Wendell reveals that he knew Leland's wife Karen. It is revealed that Wendell was friends with the man with whom Karen Leland had had an affair.

As Leland's investigation deepens, he uncovers evidence of corruption and murder. He eventually discovers that Colin was connected to a homicide that occurred earlier in Leland's career as a detective. During the investigation of Teddy Leikman's death, a confession was obtained from Felix Tesla, Leikman's roommate. Tesla was subsequently executed by electric chair, and it is revealed that Colin MacIver was the actual murderer. Joe's partner, Mike Petrakis, managed to decipher Colin's coded notes and reveal a paper trail of corruption.

== Characters in The Detective ==
=== Major characters ===
- Detective Joe Leland – A private detective, he investigates the supposed suicide of Colin MacIver per Norma's request. During his investigation, he uncovers corruption, fraud, lies, and a shocking connection to a case he solved while working on the police force.
- Karen Leland – Joe's wife.
- Dr. Wendell Roberts – A psychiatrist.
- Colin MacIver – A troubled man, murder or suicide victim.
- Norma MacIver – Colin's widow.

=== Minor characters ===
- Mike Petrakis
- Teddy Leikman
- Felix Tesla
- Dave Schoenstein
- Curran
- Florence
- Mrs. MacIver
- Betty Kaminsky
- Murray Kaminsky

== Release details ==
- 1966, Dial Press, hardcover, ISBN 0-8488-0375-2
- April 1, 1986, Delta, paperback, ISBN 0-385-29469-7
- July 1987, Amereon Ltd, hardcover, ISBN 0-8488-0375-2
