= Die Hard =

1988 film by John McTiernan

- Theatrical release poster
- Directed by: John McTiernan
- Screenplay by: Jeb Stuart; Steven E. de Souza
- Based on: Nothing Lasts Forever by Roderick Thorp
- Produced by: Lawrence Gordon; Joel Silver
- Starring: Bruce Willis; Alan Rickman; Alexander Godunov; Bonnie Bedelia
- Cinematography: Jan de Bont
- Edited by: Frank J. Urioste; John F. Link
- Music by: Michael Kamen
- Production companies: 20th Century Fox; Gordon Company; Silver Pictures
- Distributed by: 20th Century Fox
- Release dates: July 12, 1988 (Avco Theater); July 15, 1988 (United States)
- Running time: 132 minutes
- Country: United States
- Language: English
- Budget: $25–35 million
- Box office: $139.8–141.5 million

Die Hard is a 1988 American action film directed by John McTiernan and written by Jeb Stuart and Steven E. de Souza, based on the 1979 novel Nothing Lasts Forever by Roderick Thorp. It stars Bruce Willis, Alan Rickman, Alexander Godunov, and Bonnie Bedelia, with Reginald VelJohnson, William Atherton, Paul Gleason, and Hart Bochner in supporting roles. Die Hard follows a New York City police detective, John McClane (Willis), who becomes entangled in a terrorist takeover of a Los Angeles skyscraper while visiting his estranged wife during a Christmas Eve party.

Stuart was hired by 20th Century Fox to adapt Thorp's novel in 1987. His first draft was greenlit immediately, as the studio was eager for a summer blockbuster the following year. The role of McClane was turned down by a host of the decade's most popular actors, including Arnold Schwarzenegger and Sylvester Stallone. Known mainly for work on television, Willis was paid $5 million for his involvement, placing him among Hollywood's highest-paid actors. The deal was seen as a poor investment by industry professionals and attracted significant controversy towards the film prior to its release. Filming took place between November 1987 and March 1988, on a $25–35 million budget and almost entirely on location in and around Fox Plaza in Los Angeles.

Expectations for Die Hard were low; some marketing materials omitted Willis's image, ostensibly because the publicity team determined that the setting was as important as McClane. Upon its release in July 1988, initial reviews were mixed: criticism focused on its violence, plot, and Willis's performance, while McTiernan's direction and Rickman's charismatic portrayal of the villain Hans Gruber were praised. Defying predictions, Die Hard grossed approximately $140 million, becoming the year's tenth-highest-grossing film and the highest-grossing action film. Receiving four nominations at the 61st Academy Awards, it elevated Willis to leading-man status and made Rickman a celebrity.

Die Hard has been critically re-evaluated and is now considered one of the greatest action films of all time. It is considered to have revitalized the action genre, largely due to its depiction of McClane as a vulnerable and fallible protagonist, in contrast to the muscle-bound and invincible heroes of other films of the period. Retrospective commentators also identified and analyzed its themes of vengeance, masculinity, gender roles, and American anxieties over foreign influences. Due to its Christmas setting, Die Hard is often named one of the best Christmas films of all time, although its status as a Christmas film is disputed.

The film produced a host of imitators; the term "Die Hard" became a shorthand for plots featuring overwhelming odds in a restricted environment, such as "Die Hard on a bus" in relation to Speed (1994). It created a franchise comprising the sequels Die Hard 2 (1990), Die Hard with a Vengeance (1995), Live Free or Die Hard (2007), and A Good Day to Die Hard (2013), in addition to video games, comics, and other merchandise. Deemed "culturally, historically, or aesthetically significant" by the United States Library of Congress, Die Hard was selected for preservation in the National Film Registry in 2017.

== Plot ==
On Christmas Eve, New York City Police Department (NYPD) Detective John McClane arrives in Los Angeles, hoping to reconcile with his estranged wife, Holly, at a party held by her employer, the Nakatomi Corporation. He is driven to Nakatomi Plaza by a limo driver, Argyle, who offers to wait for McClane in the garage. While McClane washes himself, the tower is seized by German ex-radical Hans Gruber and his heavily armed team, including Karl and Theo. Everyone in the tower is taken hostage except for McClane, who slips away, and Argyle, who remains oblivious to events.

Gruber is posing as a terrorist to steal the $640 million (Note: The $640 million in the vault is equivalent to $1.5 billion in 2025.) in untraceable bearer bonds in the building's vault. He kills executive Joseph Takagi after failing to extract the access code from him and tasks Theo with breaking into the vault. The terrorists are alerted to McClane's presence, and Karl's brother, Tony, is sent after him. McClane kills Tony and takes his weapon and radio, which he uses to contact the skeptical Los Angeles Police Department (LAPD). Sergeant Al Powell is sent to investigate. Meanwhile, McClane kills more terrorists and recovers their bag of C-4 and detonators. Realizing Powell is about to leave, having found nothing amiss, McClane drops a terrorist's corpse onto his car. After Powell calls for backup, a SWAT team attempts to storm the building but is counterattacked by the terrorists. McClane throws some C-4 down an elevator shaft, causing an explosion that kills some of the terrorists and ends the counterattack.

Holly's co-worker Harry Ellis attempts to negotiate on Gruber's behalf but is killed by Gruber when McClane refuses to surrender. While checking the explosives on the roof, Gruber encounters McClane and pretends to be an escaped hostage; McClane gives Gruber a gun. Gruber attempts to shoot McClane but finds the weapon is unloaded, and he is saved only by the intervention of other terrorists. McClane escapes but is injured by shattered glass and loses the detonators. Outside, Federal Bureau of Investigation (FBI) agents take control. They order the power to be shut off, which, as Gruber had anticipated, disables the final vault lock so his team can collect the bonds.

The FBI agrees to Gruber's demand for a helicopter, intending to send helicopter gunships to eliminate the group. McClane realizes Gruber plans to blow the roof to kill the hostages and fake his team's deaths. Karl, enraged by Tony's death, attacks McClane and is seemingly killed. Gruber sees a news report by Richard Thornburg on McClane's children and infers that he is Holly's husband. The hostages are taken to the roof while Gruber keeps Holly with him. McClane drives the hostages from the roof just before Gruber detonates it and destroys the approaching FBI helicopters. Meanwhile, Theo retrieves an escape vehicle from the parking garage but is knocked out by Argyle, who has been following events on the limo's CB radio.

A weary and battered McClane finds Holly with Gruber and his remaining henchman. McClane seemingly surrenders to Gruber and is about to be shot but grabs his concealed service pistol taped to his back and uses his last two bullets to wound Gruber and kill his accomplice. Gruber crashes through a window but grabs onto Holly's wristwatch and makes a last-ditch attempt to kill the pair. McClane unclasps the watch, and Gruber falls to his death. Outside, Karl ambushes McClane and Holly, only to be shot dead by Powell. Holly punches Thornburg when he attempts to interview McClane. Argyle crashes through the parking garage door in the limo and drives McClane and Holly away together.

== Cast ==
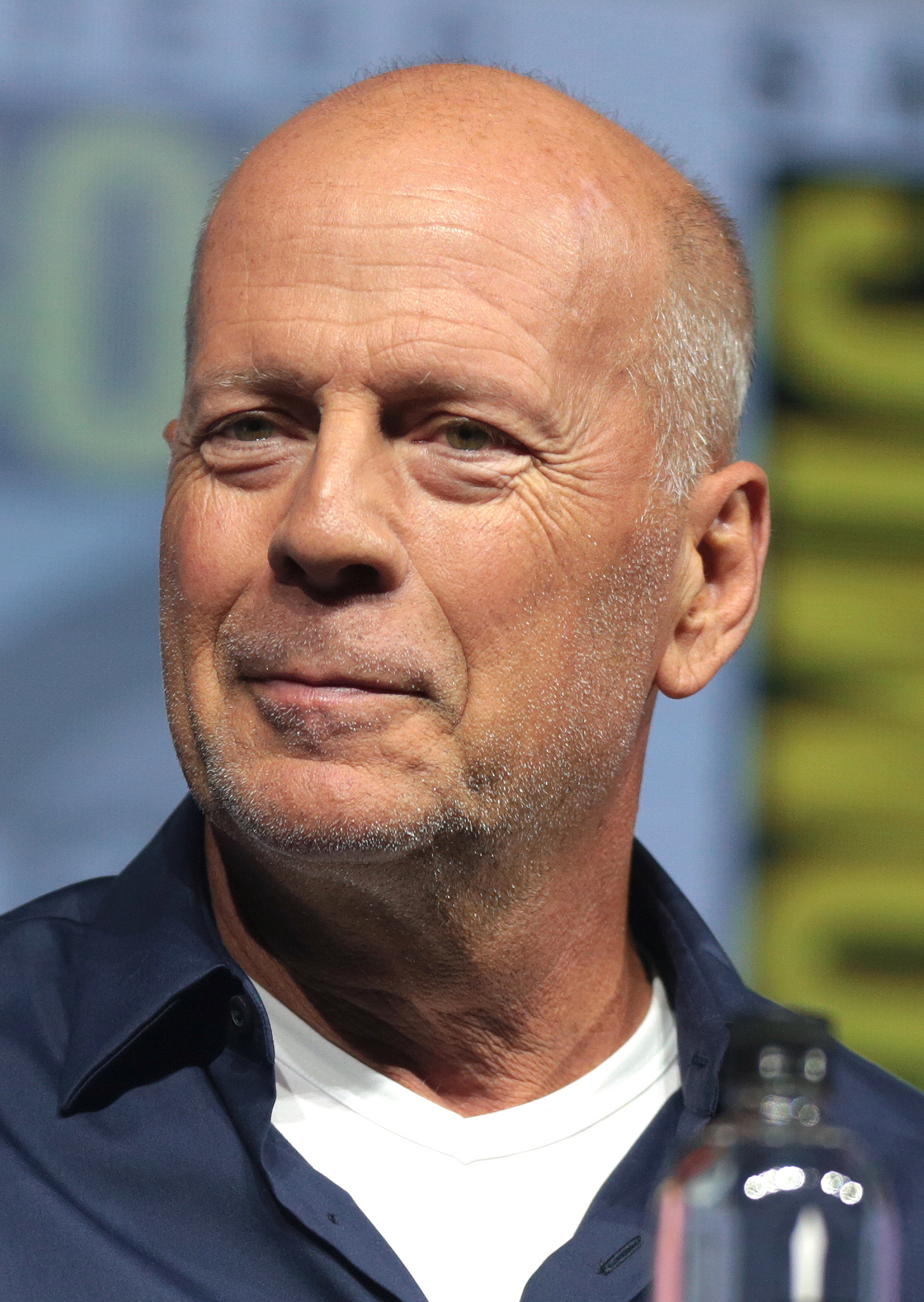
Bruce Willis in 2018

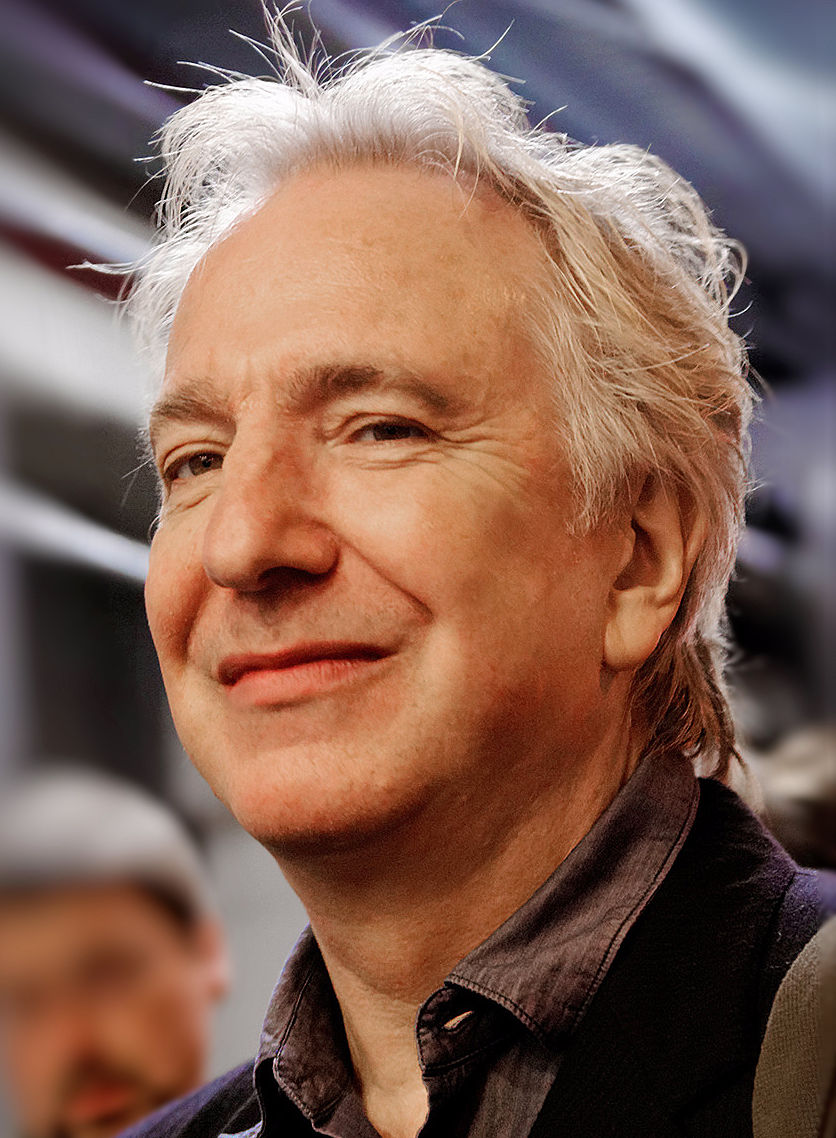
Alan Rickman in 2011

- Bruce Willis as John McClane, a New York City police detective
- Alan Rickman as Hans Gruber, the ruthless leader of the terrorists
- Alexander Godunov as Karl, Gruber's second-in-command
- Bonnie Bedelia as Holly Gennaro-McClane, a high-ranking Nakatomi executive and John's estranged wife
- Reginald VelJohnson as Al Powell, an LAPD sergeant
- Paul Gleason as Dwayne T. Robinson, the LAPD deputy chief
- De'voreaux White as Argyle, John's limousine driver
- William Atherton as Richard Thornburg, an unscrupulous TV reporter
- Clarence Gilyard as Theo, Gruber's tech specialist
- Hart Bochner as Harry Ellis, a sleazy Nakatomi executive
- James Shigeta as Joseph Yoshinobu Takagi, Nakatomi's head executive

Other cast members include Gruber's henchmen: Bruno Doyon as Franco, Andreas Wisniewski as Tony, Joey Plewa as Alexander, Lorenzo Caccialanza as Marco, Gerard Bonn as Kristoff, Dennis Hayden as Eddie, Al Leong as Uli, Gary Roberts as Heinrich, Hans Buhringer as Fritz, and Wilhelm von Homburg as James. Robert Davi and Grand L. Bush appear as FBI special agents Big Johnson and Little Johnson, respectively, Tracy Reiner appears as Thornburg's assistant, and Taylor Fry and Noah Land make minor appearances as McClane's children Lucy McClane and John Jr.

== Production ==
=== Development and writing ===
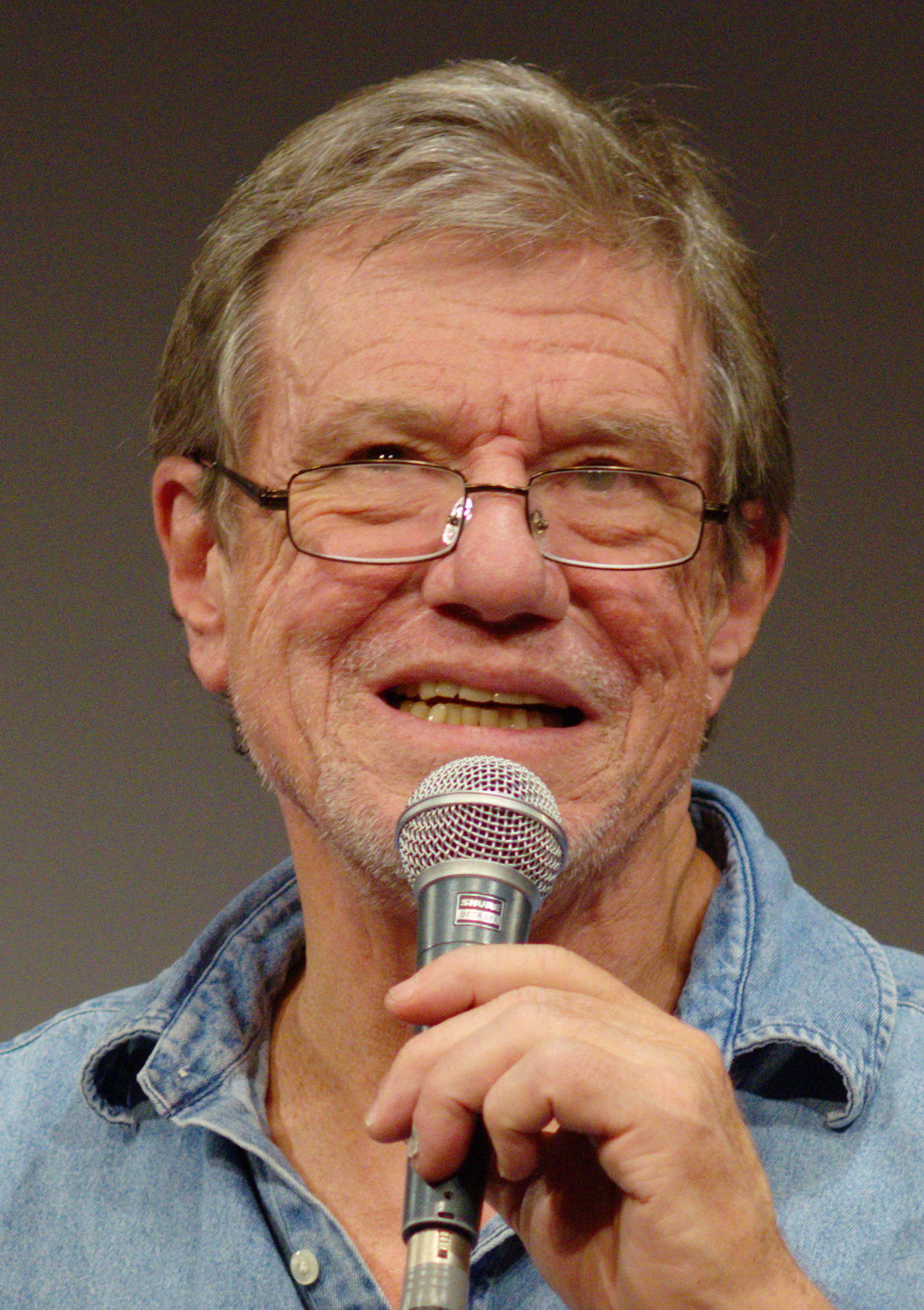
Director John McTiernan in 2014

The development of Die Hard began in 1987, when screenwriter Jeb Stuart was in dire financial straits. His script purchased by Columbia Pictures had been abandoned and a contract at Walt Disney Pictures was not providing him with sufficient income. Stuart had six weeks between contracted work so his agent Jeremy Zimmer contacted Lloyd Levin, the head of development at the Gordon Company, a producing arm of 20th Century Fox.

Levin asked Stuart to work on an adaptation of the 1979 novel Nothing Lasts Forever written by former private investigator Roderick Thorp. Thorp had been inspired to write Nothing Lasts Forever by a dream he had—in which armed assailants chase a man through a building—after watching the 1974 disaster film The Towering Inferno. Fox had adapted the book's 1966 predecessor, The Detective, for the 1968 film The Detective starring Frank Sinatra as NYPD detective Joe Leland, and purchased the sequel rights before Nothing Lasts Forever had been written.

Levin gave Stuart creative freedom as long as he retained the Christmas-in-Los-Angeles setting; the concept, he considered, would provide an interesting aesthetic. The film was pitched as "Rambo in an office building", referring to the successful Rambo film series. Producers Lawrence Gordon and Joel Silver hired director John McTiernan because of his work with them on the successful 1987 action film Predator. McTiernan agreed to direct on the condition that the film would have "some joy" and not simply contain "mean, nasty acts", seen in other terrorist films.

Stuart began working 18-hour days at his office at Walt Disney Studios in Burbank, which left him exhausted and "on edge". After an argument with his wife, he went for a drive and saw a box in his lane; unable to avoid it, he was forced to drive over it and discovered it to be empty. According to Stuart, he pulled over on the side of the freeway, his "heart pounding". From this, Stuart conceived a central theme of the story of a man who should have apologized to his wife before a catastrophe. He returned home to reconcile with his wife and wrote 35 pages that night. To shape the McClanes' relationship, Stuart also drew upon the marital problems of his peers, including divorces and ex-wives reverting to use their maiden name.

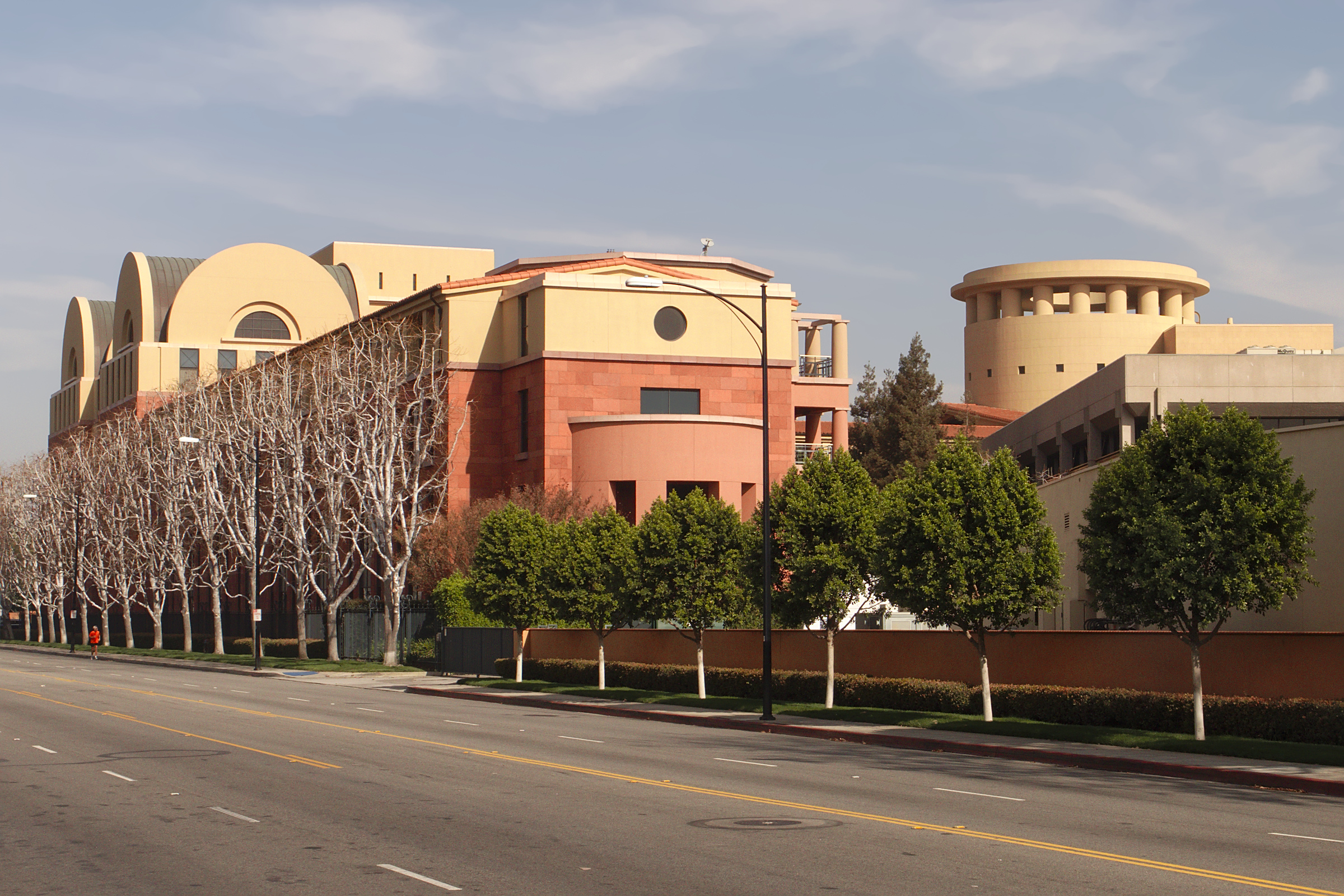
Jeb Stuart wrote his initial draft in his office at the Walt Disney Studios in Burbank, California.

John McClane was named John Ford initially, but 20th Century Fox felt this was disrespectful to the deceased director of the same name. Stuart chose McClane as a "good strong Scottish name", based on his own Celtic heritage. He described the character as a flawed hero who learns a lesson in the worst possible situation and becomes a better, but not a different, person. Having no experience writing action films, Stuart drew on his experience writing thrillers, focusing on making the audience care about McClane, Holly, and their reconciliation. As Stuart pitched his story to executives, Gordon interrupted him, told him to complete a draft, and left the meeting. Stuart finished his first draft just under six weeks later.

Stuart credits Levin for helping him understand Nothing Lasts Forever. He adapted many sequences faithfully, including a C-4 charge being thrown down an elevator shaft and the book's central character, Joe Leland, leaping from the roof. However, the novel is told entirely from Leland's perspective, and events he is not present for are not detailed. Its tone is also more cynical and nihilistic: Leland visits his drug-addicted daughter at the Klaxon building, and she dies having fallen from the building alongside villain Anton Gruber, who is using naïve male and female guerrilla soldiers to rob the building because of Klaxon's support for a dictatorial government. This made their motivations less clear and Leland more conflicted about killing them, especially the women. Leland is written as an experienced older man working as a high-powered security consultant. Stuart rejected the novel's tone for being "too sad", and believed an older action hero—Leland being over 60—was nonsensical. Stuart created new material for scenes when McClane is not present, expanding upon or introducing characters: he gave Powell a wife and children, allowing him to relate more closely to McClane; and Argyle, whose novel counterpart disappears early in the story, is present throughout Stuart's draft, supporting McClane by broadcasting rap music over the terrorists' radios. Among the script's original characters is the unscrupulous journalist Richard Thornburg.

A fan of prominent Western film actor John Wayne, Stuart was inspired to carry a Western motif throughout the script, including cowboy lingo. He befriended a construction superintendent at the under-construction Fox Plaza in Los Angeles, allowing him access to the building to gain ideas on how to lay out the characters and scenes. He delivered the finished screenplay in June 1987. It was greenlit the following day, in part because 20th Century Fox needed a summer blockbuster for 1988.

=== Casting ===
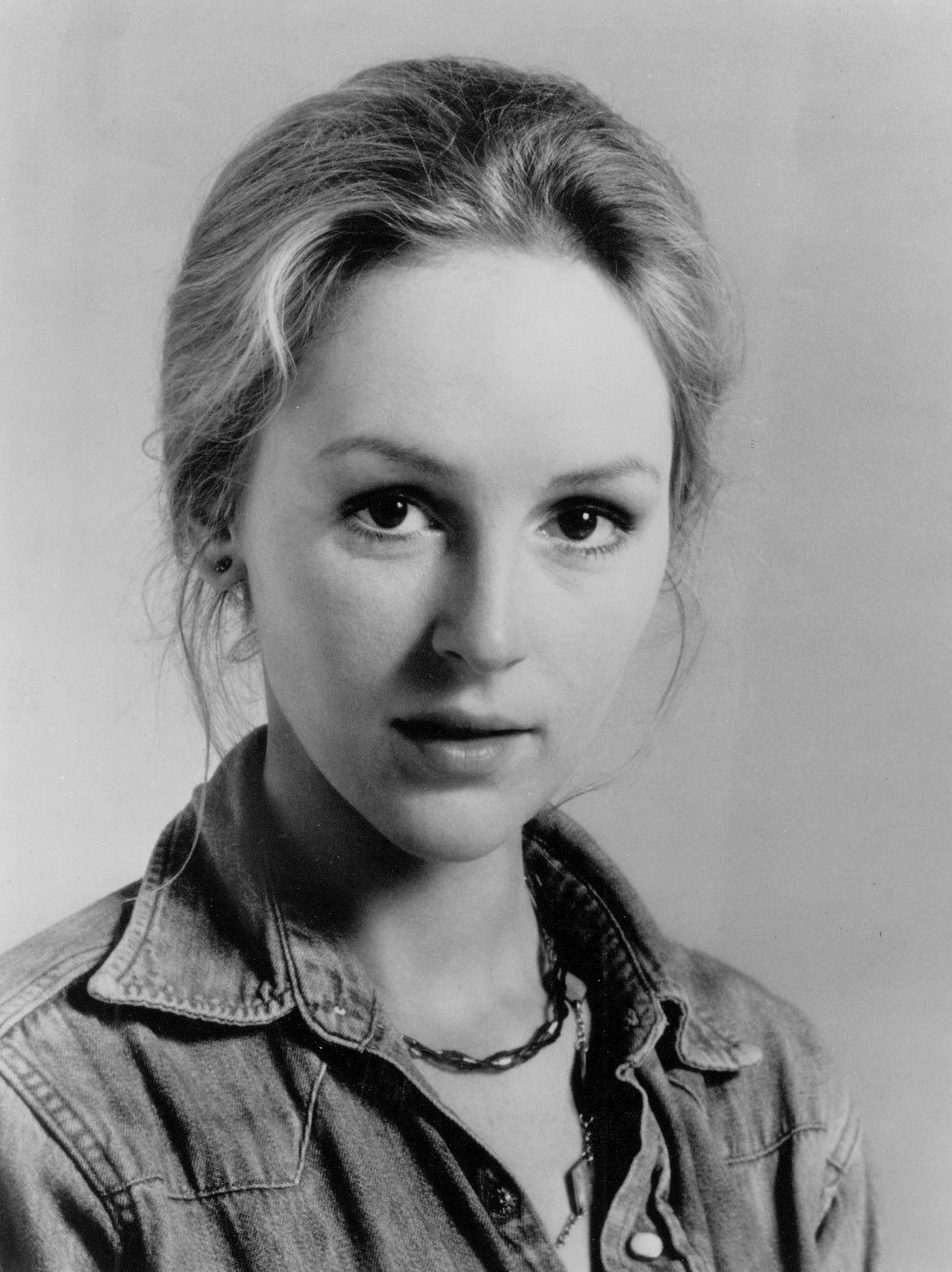
Willis chose Bonnie Bedelia (pictured in 1974) to portray Holly Gennero-McClane after he saw her performance in Heart Like a Wheel (1983).

Because Die Hard was based on the novel sequel to the film adaptation of The Detective, the studio was contractually obliged to offer Frank Sinatra the role of John McClane. Sinatra, who was 70 at the time, declined. The role was then offered to various major stars including Sylvester Stallone, Richard Gere, Clint Eastwood, Harrison Ford, Burt Reynolds, Nick Nolte, Mel Gibson, Don Johnson, Richard Dean Anderson, Paul Newman, James Caan, and Al Pacino. The prevailing action archetype of the era was a muscle-bound, invincible macho man like Arnold Schwarzenegger, who was offered the role, but he wanted to branch out into comedy and turned it down to star in Twins (1988). Bruce Willis was known mainly for his comedic role in the romantic comedy television series Moonlighting, starring opposite Cybill Shepherd. He declined the role because of his contractual obligations to Moonlighting, but when Shepherd became pregnant, the show's production was stopped for eleven weeks, giving Willis enough time to take the role.

McTiernan's girlfriend had a chance meeting with a representative of CinemaScore and asked them for analysis of Willis as the star. Their analysis showed that casting Willis would not have a negative impact; his participation was confirmed two weeks later. The choice was controversial as Willis had starred in only one other film, the moderately successful comedy Blind Date (1987). At the time, there was also a clear distinction between film and television actors. Though films like Ghostbusters (1984) had demonstrated that television stars could lead a blockbuster film, other television actors like Shelley Long and Bill Cosby had failed in their recent attempts to make the transition.

Willis received $5 million for the role, giving him a salary comparable to more successful, established film actors like Dustin Hoffman, Warren Beatty, and Robert Redford. 20th Century Fox president Leonard Goldberg justified the figure by saying Die Hard needed an actor of Willis's potential, and Gordon said that Willis's everyman persona was essential to conveying the idea that the hero could actually fail. Other Fox sources were reported as saying the studio was desperate for a star after being turned down by so many popular actors. Willis said, "They paid me what they thought I was worth for the film, and for them." He described the character as unlike the larger-than-life characters portrayed by Stallone or Schwarzenegger, saying "even though he's a hero, he is just a regular guy. He's an ordinary guy who's been thrown into extraordinary circumstances". Willis drew upon his working-class upbringing in South Jersey for the character, including "that attitude and disrespect for authority, that gallows sense of humor, the reluctant hero".

Rickman was already in his early 40s as he made his screen debut as Hans Gruber. He was cast by Silver, who had seen him perform in a Broadway version of Les Liaisons Dangereuses, playing the villainous Vicomte de Valmont. Bedelia was cast at Willis's suggestion after he saw her in the 1983 biographical film Heart Like a Wheel. VelJohnson appeared as Al Powell in his first major film role at the suggestion of casting director Jackie Burch, with whom he had worked previously. Robert Duvall, Gene Hackman, Laurence Fishburne, and Wesley Snipes were considered for the role. Ellis is portrayed by Hart Bochner, an acquaintance of Silver. His role was shot in chronological order over three weeks. McTiernan had wanted the character to be suave like actor Cary Grant, but Bochner conceived of the character's motivations coming from cocaine use and insecurity. McTiernan hated the performance initially until he noticed Gordon and Silver were entertained by Bochner's antics.

=== Re-write ===
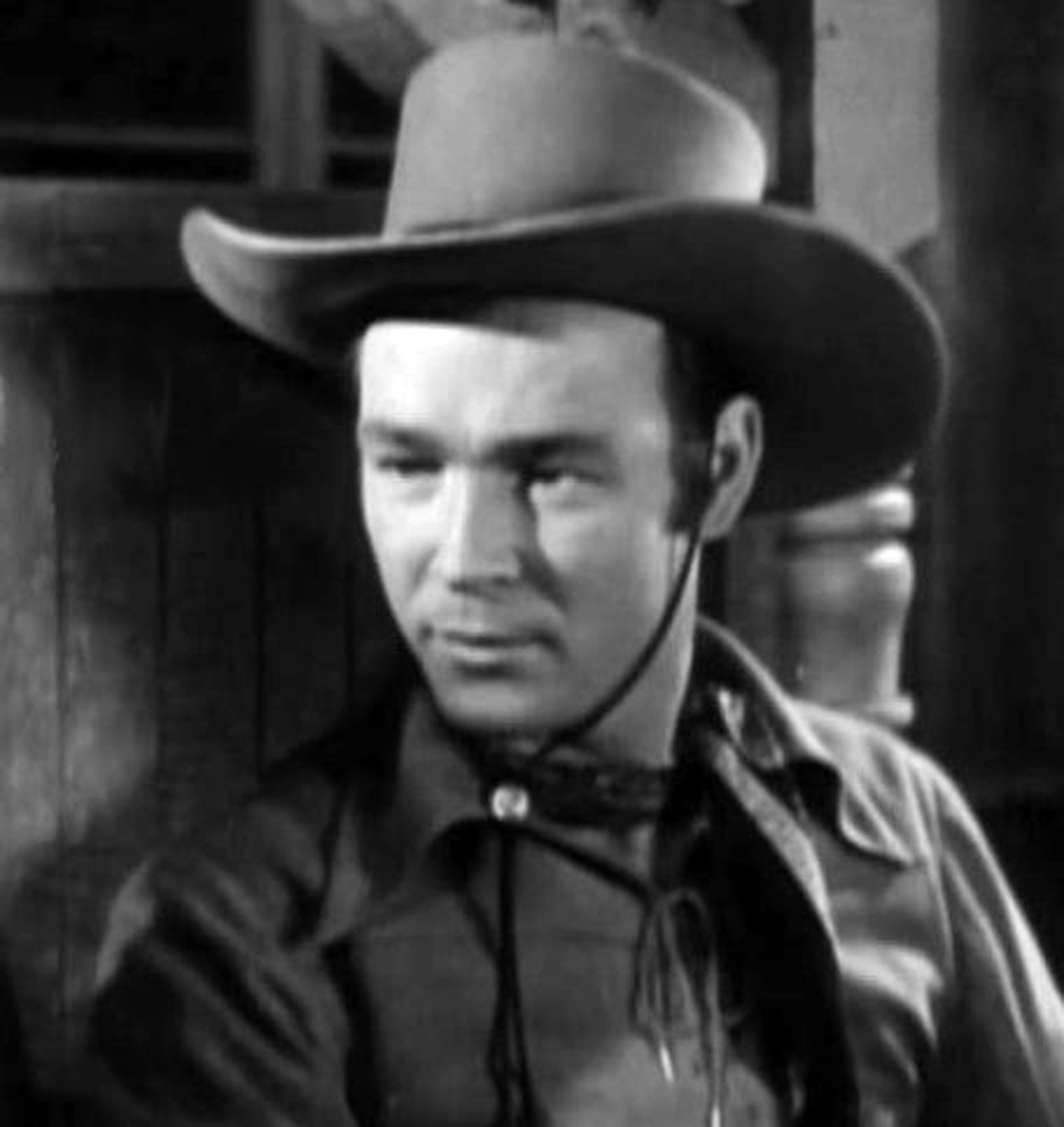
John McClane's catchphrase "Yippee-ki-yay, motherfucker" was inspired by western actor Roy Rogers's (pictured) own "Yippee-ki-yay, kids".

Screenwriter Steven E. de Souza rewrote Stuart's script because he had experience in blending action and comedy. He approached the story as if Gruber were the protagonist. He said, "If [Gruber] had not planned the robbery and put it together, [McClane] would have just gone to the party and reconciled or not with his wife. You should sometimes think about looking at your movie through the point of view of the villain who is really driving the narrative." De Souza used blueprints of Fox Plaza to help him lay out the story and character locations within the building.

The script continued to undergo changes up to and during filming. Several subplots and traits for characters other than McClane were created during the first few weeks of filming because Willis was still working on Moonlighting. He would film the show for up to ten hours and then work on Die Hard at night. McTiernan gave Willis time off to rest and tasked De Souza with adding the new scenes. These included scenes with Holly's housekeeper, Holly confronting Gruber following Takagi's death, an introductory scene for Thornburg, and more moments between Powell and his fellow officers.

Silver wanted a scene between McClane and Gruber before the film's denouement, but De Souza could not think of a plausible scenario until he happened to overhear Rickman affecting an American accent. He realized this would allow Gruber to disguise himself when he met McClane, and the earlier scene of Takagi's murder was reworked to conceal Gruber's identity from McClane. Due to the addition of the Gruber/McClane meeting scene, a different one in which McClane kills Theo was excised.

In Stuart's original script, Die Hard took place over three days, but McTiernan was inspired to have it take place over a single night like Shakespeare's A Midsummer Night's Dream. He did not want to use terrorists as the villains, as he considered them to be "too mean", and avoided focusing on the terrorists' politics in favor of making them thieves driven by monetary pursuits; he felt this would make it more suitable summer entertainment.

McClane's character was not fully realized until almost halfway through production. McTiernan and Willis had determined that McClane is a man who does not like himself much but is doing the best he can in a bad situation. McClane's catchphrase, "Yipee-ki-yay, motherfucker", was inspired by old cowboy lingo, including cowboy actor Roy Rogers's own "Yippee-ki-yah, kids", to emphasize his all-American character. There was a debate over whether to use "Yippee-ki-yay, motherfucker" or "yippee-ti-yay, motherfucker"; Willis endorsed the former.

=== Filming ===
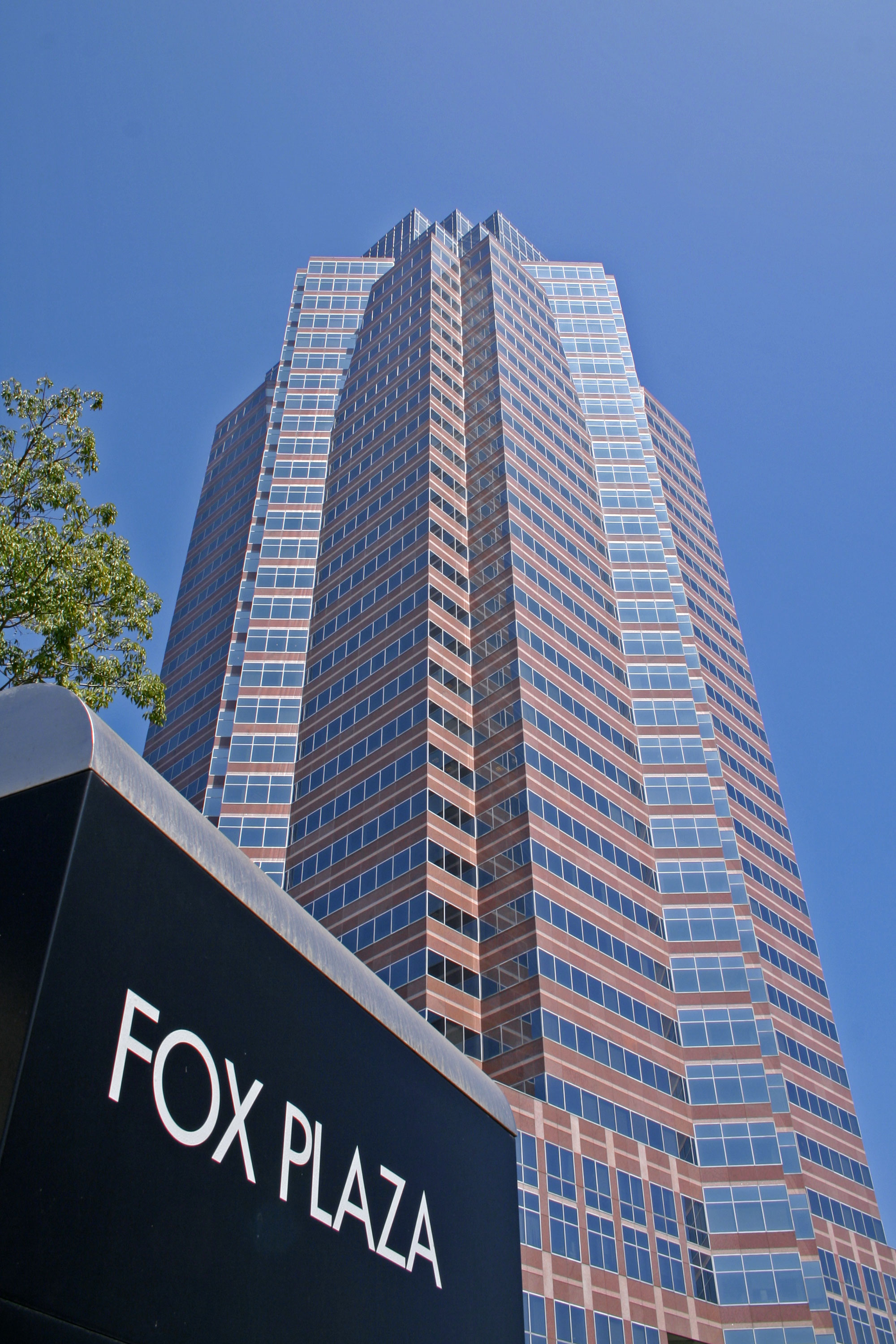
Fox Plaza in Century City, Los Angeles, served as the setting for Nakatomi Plaza.

Principal photography began in November 1987, and concluded by early March 1988, with an approximate $25–$35 million budget. (Note: Attributed to multiple references:) (Note: The 1988 budget of $25–$35 million is equivalent to $58.6 million–$82.1 million in 2025.) Filming took place almost entirely in and around Fox Plaza in Century City, situated on the Avenue of the Stars. The location was chosen late in production by production designer Jackson De Govia. A mostly unoccupied building was needed, which the under-construction Fox Plaza offered; it was secured with two main conditions: no filming during the day and no damage from explosions.

Cinematographer Jan de Bont said the building's design was distinct, making it a character on its own, and clear views of the building were available from a distance, enabling establishing shots as McClane approaches it. The surrounding city could be seen from within the building, enhancing the realism. De Bont frequently used handheld cameras to film closer to the characters, creating a more cinematic "intimacy". Very little of the film was storyboarded beforehand because De Bont believed intricate storyboarding made his job redundant. Instead, he and McTiernan would discuss that day's filming in detail, and the feeling or sensation they wanted to convey. De Bont was more concerned with creating a dramatic rather than an attractive shot. He cited the use of real flares in the film that generated unpredictable smoke and sometimes obscured the image.

Willis's first day on set was on November 2, 1987. He came straight from filming Moonlighting to shoot one of his most pivotal scenes, where McClane leaps from a rooftop as it explodes behind him, saved only by a length of firehose. Willis found acting in Die Hard difficult because it differed from previous experiences in that he was often alone, not having any personal encounters with others. He did not spend much time with the rest of the cast between takes, opting to spend it with his new partner, Demi Moore. In contrast to their on-screen dynamics, Bedelia and VelJohnson spent most of their time between scenes with Rickman. When asked to throw Holly to the floor, Rickman refused because he believed it was not a fitting action for the "civilized" Gruber and that Holly, "a self-possessed career woman", would not have let him.

The film's ending had not been finalized when filming began. In the finished film, Theo retrieves an ambulance from the truck the terrorists arrived in to use as an escape vehicle, but as this was a late addition, the truck the terrorists had been filmed arriving in was too small to hold an ambulance. Another scene, showing the terrorists synchronizing their TAG Heuer watches, also showed the truck was empty; this scene had to be deleted, leading to other necessary changes. As scripted, McClane realizes that the American hostage he encounters is Gruber because of the distinctive TAG Heuer watch he observed on the other terrorists; the watches were no longer an established plot point. It necessitated the introduction of a heroic scene for Argyle, who gets to stop Theo's escape. De'voreaux actually punched Gilyard during the scene, which was added in only in the last 10 days of filming.

There was flexibility with some roles, depending on the actors' performances, meaning some characters were kept in the film longer and others killed off sooner. The actors were also given some room to improvise, like Theo's line, "The quarterback is toast", Bochner's "Hans, bubby, I'm your white knight", and the henchman Uli stealing a chocolate bar during the SWAT assault. McTiernan took stylistic influence from French New Wave cinema when editing the film. He recruited Frank J. Urioste and John F. Link to edit scenes together while in mid-motion, contrary to the mainstream style of editing used at the time.

=== Music ===
Michael Kamen – Assault on the Tower
Kamen used samples from various classic songs and sleigh bells to create a score that highlighted the violence

Before hiring composer Michael Kamen, McTiernan knew he wanted to include Beethoven's 9th Symphony (commonly known as "Ode to Joy"), having heard it in Stanley Kubrick's A Clockwork Orange (1971). Kamen objected to "tarnishing" the piece in an action film and offered to misuse German composer Richard Wagner's music instead. Once McTiernan explained how the 9th Symphony had been used in A Clockwork Orange to highlight the ultra-violence, Kamen had a better understanding of McTiernan's intentions. In exchange, Kamen insisted that they also license the use of "Singin' in the Rain" (1952) (also used in A Clockwork Orange) and "Winter Wonderland" (1934). He mixed the melodies of "Ode to Joy", "Winter Wonderland", and "Singin' in the Rain" into his score, mainly to underscore the villains. The samples of "Ode to Joy" are played in slightly lower keys to sound more menacing; the references build to a performance of the symphony when Gruber finally accesses the Nakatomi vault. The score also references "Let It Snow! Let It Snow! Let It Snow!".

Kamen initially saw a mostly incomplete version of Die Hard and was unimpressed. He saw the film as primarily about a "phenomenal bad guy" who made McClane seem less important. Kamen was dismissive of film scores, believing they could not stand alone from the film. His original score incorporates pizzicato and arco strings, brass, woodwinds and sleigh bells added during moments of menace to counter their festive meaning. There are other uses of classical diegetic music in the film; the musicians at the party play Brandenburg Concerto No. 3 by Johann Sebastian Bach.

McTiernan did not like a piece created for the final scene in which Karl attempts to kill McClane, and decided to use a temporary track that was already in place: a piece of James Horner's unused score for Aliens (1986). Cues are also used from the 1987 action film Man on Fire. Die Hard also features "Christmas in Hollis" by Run-DMC, which would go on to be considered a Christmas classic, in part because of its use in the film.

== Stunts and designs ==
=== Stunts ===
The perception of film stunts changed shortly before production of Die Hard following a fatal accident on the set of Twilight Zone: The Movie (1983), and a push was made to prioritize a film's crew over the film itself. Even so, Willis insisted on performing many of his own stunts, including rolling down steps and standing on top of an active elevator. The first scene he shot was his leap from the top of Nakatomi Plaza with a firehose wrapped around his waist. The stunt involved a 25-foot (7.6 m) leap from a five-story parking garage ledge onto an airbag as a 60-foot (18 m) wall of flame exploded behind him. He considered it to be one of his toughest stunts. The explosive force pushed him towards the edge of the airbag and the crew was concerned he had died. Stuntman Ken Bates stood in for Willis when his character is hanging from the building.

Alan Rickman was suspended from a raised platform and dropped onto an airbag. To capture the descent, an automated system controlled the camera's focus ring to keep Rickman in focus.

A set was used for the following scene where McClane shoots out a window to re-enter the building. It was shot approximately halfway into the filming schedule so that all involved had gained more stunt experience. The window was made of fragile sugar glass that took two hours to set up, and there were only a few takes for this reason. Instead of a hoist, a team of stuntmen positioned below the window dragged the hose and pulled Willis towards the edge, as they could better control Willis's fall if he went over. Editor Frank Urioste kept the scene where McClane falls down a ventilation shaft and catches onto a lower opening; Willis's stuntman accidentally fell further than intended. During a scene where McClane shoots a terrorist through a table, Willis, firing the weapon while holding it compressed into his upper chest, suffered a permanent two-thirds hearing loss in his left ear caused by firing loud blank cartridges close to his head.

For Gruber's fall from Nakatomi Plaza, Rickman was dropped between 20 and 70 feet (6 and 21 m); reports are inconsistent. He was suspended on a raised platform and dropped onto a blue screen airbag. This allowed the background behind him to be composited with footage taken from Fox Plaza and falling confetti that looked like bearer bonds. Rickman had to fall backward onto the bag, something stuntmen avoid to control their fall. McTiernan convinced Rickman by demonstrating the stunt himself and falling onto a pile of cardboard boxes. Rickman was told he would be dropped on a count of three, but he was let go earlier to elicit a genuine look of surprise. McTiernan said, "there's no way he could fake that". The first take was used, but McTiernan convinced Rickman to perform a second one as backup.

Capturing the stunt was difficult because it was impossible for a human operator to refocus the camera fast enough to prevent the image from blurring as Rickman fell away. Supervised by visual effects producer Richard Edlund, Boss Film Studios engineered an automated system using a computer that rapidly refocused the camera via a motor on its focus ring. A wide-angle lens camera shooting at 270 frames per second was used, creating footage that played 10 times slower than normal. Despite these innovations, the camera struggled to keep Rickman entirely in focus during his 1.5-second fall; the scene cuts away from Rickman as the usable footage runs out. To complete Gruber's fatal descent, Bates was lowered 318 feet (97 m) from Fox Plaza in a harness that slowed his fall as he neared the ground. Some of the Fox Plaza residents, frustrated by the debris and destruction around the building, refused to turn off their office lights for exterior shots of the Plaza.

Months of negotiations took place for permission to drive a SWAT vehicle up the steps of Fox Plaza. A railing knocked over during shooting was never replaced. Small explosives moving along a guidewire were disguised as the terrorist rockets, giving the appearance of them striking the vehicle. In the scene where McClane throws C4 down the elevator shaft to stop the assault, the effects team unwittingly blew out every window on one floor of the building. The final helicopter scene took six months of preparation, and only two hours were set aside to film it. It took three attempts above Fox Plaza, and nine camera crews filming with twenty-four different cameras. De Bont said the different angles enhanced the on-location realism.

Mortar-like devices filled with propane were used for explosions. They took ten minutes to install and offered a six-second burst of flame. The explosion of the Nakatomi rooftop was created using a miniature model; this was the only miniature used in the film. Because Hans Buhringer (Fritz) was an inexperienced actor and filming was behind schedule, a Native American stuntman was put in a blond wig and equipped with squibs to capture the character's death in one take.

=== Design ===
To prevent the in-building locations looking similar because of the standard fluorescent office lighting, De Bont concealed small film lights in high locations. He controlled these to create more dynamic and dramatic lighting. This gave him the opportunity to use unusual light positioning. He also placed fluorescent tubes on the floor in one scene to indicate they had not been installed. The shifting nature of the filming script meant some sets were designed before it was known what they were to be used for.

The Nakatomi Building's 30th floor—where the hostages are held—was one of the few sets. It contained a recreation of the Frank Lloyd Wright-designed house Fallingwater. De Govia reasoned that it reflected the contemporary trend of Japanese corporations buying up American corporate assets. An early design for the Nakatomi logo was too reminiscent of a swastika and it was re-designed to look closer to a samurai warrior's helmet. A 380-foot-long (120 m) matte painting provided the city backdrop as viewed from inside the building's 30th floor. It featured animated lights and other lighting techniques to present both moving traffic, daytime and nighttime.

== Release ==
=== Context ===
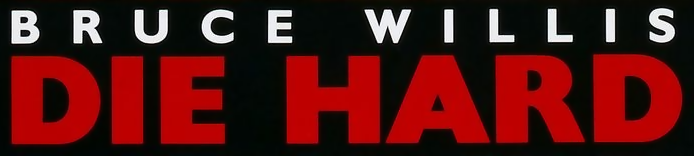
The logo for Die Hard

The summer of 1988 was expected by film industry executives to be dominated by action and comedy films, although a broader range of films were released that year. More films targeted older audiences rather than teenagers, a reflection of the increasing age of the average audience member. Sequels to successful films, Crocodile Dundee II and Rambo III, were predicted to control the May box office and break opening weekend revenue records. Industry executives also had high expectations for the comedies Coming to America and Who Framed Roger Rabbit.

Expectations for Die Hard were low compared to its action film competition—the Schwarzenegger-starring Red Heat and Clint Eastwood's The Dead Pool. The New York Times noted that Die Hard, and the comedies Big Top Pee-wee and Bull Durham, would be closely scrutinized by the industry for success or failure. Die Hard was singled out for Willis's salary, and the failure earlier that year of his previous film, the western Sunset, which brought into question his leading man capabilities. Lawrence Gordon agreed that not using a major action star like Stallone or Eastwood meant audience interest in Die Hard was lower than it might have been. The larger salaries paid to these stars were based on the built-in audience they could attract to a film's opening week, with good word of mouth supporting the film thereafter, but Willis did not have a built-in audience.

=== Marketing ===
Willis featured prominently in the film's early marketing campaign, but it underwent several changes as the film's release date drew nearer. Willis had developed a reputation as an "arrogant" actor concerned with his own fame. His refusal to address this, or speak about his personal life to the media, had reinforced this perception. For his part, Willis said that he wanted the media to focus on his acting. There were reports that cinema audiences would moan at Willis's appearance in Die Hard trailers, and that a representative from an unnamed theater chain had pulled the trailer in response. Research by several film studios revealed that audiences had a negative opinion of Willis overall and little or no interest in seeing him in Die Hard. Newsweek's David Ansen called Willis "the most unpopular actor ever to get $5 million for making a movie".

As 20th Century Fox's confidence in Willis's appeal faltered, the film's posters were changed to focus on Nakatomi Plaza, with Willis's name billed in tiny print. Willis's image was not included in the film's first full-page newspaper advertisement in mid-July. 20th Century Fox executive Tom Sherak denied that Willis was being hidden, saying their marketing strategy had changed when they realized that the building was as important a character as the actor. Defying expectations, sneak previews of the film were well received by audiences, and the week following its release, the advertising began featuring Willis more prominently. Despite his dislike of interviews, Willis appeared on several daytime shows to promote the film. Explaining why he was more involved in the promotion for Die Hard, Willis said, "I'm so excited about this film... To me, it represents why I wanted to be an actor."

=== Box office ===
Die Hard's premiere took place on July 12, 1988, at the Avco theater in Los Angeles, California. In North America, the film received a limited release in 21 theaters in 13 cities on July 15, 1988, earning $601,851—an average of $28,659 per theater. It was considered a successful debut with a high per-theater average gross. The Los Angeles Times said that the late change in advertising focus and diminishing popularity for action films should have worked against Die Hard. Instead, positive reviews and the limited release had made it a "must-see" film.

It received a wide release the following week on July 22, 1988, across 1,276 theaters, and earning $7.1 million—an average of $5,569 per theater. The film finished as the number three film of the weekend, behind Coming to America ($8.8 million)—in its fourth week of release—and Who Framed Roger Rabbit ($8.9 million), in its fifth. The film fell to number four in its third week with a further gross of $6.1 million, just behind Coming to America ($6.4 million), Who Framed Roger Rabbit ($6.5 million) and the debuting romantic comedy Cocktail ($11.7 million). In its fourth weekend, it rebounded to the number three position with $5.7 million. While the film never claimed the number-one box office ranking, it spent ten straight weeks among the top five highest-grossing films. In total, the film earned an approximate box office gross of between $81.3 million and $83 million. This made it the seventh-highest-grossing film of 1988, behind Crocodile Dundee II ($109.3 million), buddy comedy Twins ($111.9 million), fantasy-comedy Big ($114.9 million), Coming to America ($128.1 million), Who Framed Roger Rabbit ($154.1 million) and comedy-drama Rain Man ($172.8 million).

Outside North America, Die Hard is estimated to have earned $57.7 million, giving it an approximate cumulative gross of between $139.1 million and $140.7 million. (Note: The 1988 box office of $139.1–$140.7 million is equivalent to $326 million–$330 million in 2025.) This figure makes it the tenth-highest-grossing film worldwide of 1988 behind Big ($151 million), Cocktail ($171 million), A Fish Called Wanda ($177 million), Rambo III ($189 million), Twins ($216 million), Crocodile Dundee II ($239 million), Coming to America ($288 million), Who Framed Roger Rabbit ($329 million) and Rain Man ($354 million). (Note: The Numbers and Box Office Mojo provide North American box office figures, but they do not include the international figures for many 1988 films. When failing to take into account the international grosses of some films, Die Hard is the eighth-highest-grossing film worldwide of 1988. Based on other industry reports in 1988 by Variety, the worldwide grosses of Cocktail and A Fish Called Wanda were greater than Die Hard's, lowering it to the tenth-highest-grossing film overall.)

The summer of 1988 saw box office grosses totaling $1.7 billion, breaking the previous year's record-breaking summer by $100 million, and it was the most successful summer since 1984, when only three films earned more than $100 million in North America. Defying pre-release expectations Die Hard was considered an enormous success. In a year otherwise dominated by comedy films, Die Hard's overperformance was an anomaly compared to other action films such as Rambo III and Red Heat, which failed to meet box office expectations. Film critic Sheila Benson believed this demonstrated a generational shift in audiences and their tastes; in particular, 25- to 37-year-old men had turned against alcohol abuse, sexism, and mindless machismo. Along with films like Big and Young Guns (1988), Die Hard is credited with revitalizing 20th Century Fox, which had had few successes in preceding years. It also showed the action genre was not "dead".

== Reception ==
=== Critical response ===
Initial critical reviews of Die Hard were mixed. Audiences reacted more positively; polls by the market research firm CinemaScore found that audiences gave it a rare average rating of "A+" on an A+ to F scale.

McTiernan's direction was praised. In the Chicago Tribune, Dave Kehr wrote that McTiernan's "logical" direction created a sense of scale in the film that made it seem more significant than its content. The scene in which the terrorists take over the building was described as a "textbook study" by Kevin Thomas, providing a strong introduction to both McTiernan's abilities and De Bont's cinematography. De Govia's set design was complimented by Kehr as "ingenious". Ebert praised the stunts and special effects.

Critics were conflicted over Willis's performance. Many considered Die Hard Willis's breakout role, reviving his faltering transition from television to film star, and demonstrating his leading-man status and comedic range. Kathy Huffhines and James Mills considered Willis's performance an evolution of his Moonlighting character David Addison with less sexism and more masculinity. Huffhines wrote that the performance improved as Willis hewed closer to his own working-class background. Reviewers including Terry Lawson and Paul Willistein believed that despite expectations, Willis had been well cast, bringing a necessary vulnerability and sense of humor to a contemporary hero; one who displays remorse, fear, and indecision without being overly macho or comedic, and delivers dialogue that other action stars could not. Marke Andrews argued that this vulnerability was essential to creating tension because audiences care about the character's fate. Some reviewers felt that Willis's strongest talent—his comedic ability—had been woefully underutilized.

Writing for The Washington Post, Hal Hinson complimented Willis's "grace and physical bravado" that allowed him to stand alongside the likes of Stallone and Schwarzenegger. Conversely Vincent Canby said he lacked "toughness". Reviewers generally agreed that Willis's dramatic acting was unimpressive or limited; Jay Boyar believed his abilities were perfect for McClane, although Kehr criticized him as only a television-level star. Richard Schickel said Willis's performance was "whiny and self-involved", and that removing his undershirt by the film's denouement was the totality of his acting range. He acknowledged it was difficult to perform when acting only against special effects.

Rickman's performance was praised. (Note: Attributed to multiple references:) Caryn James said he was the film's best feature, portraying "the perfect snake", and Hinson likened his work to the "sneering", malevolent performance by Laurence Olivier in Richard III (1955). Kehr called Gruber a classic villain who combined the silliness of actor Claude Rains and the "smiling dementia" of actor George Macready. Canby said that Rickman provided the only credible performance, and Roger Ebert—who was otherwise critical of the film—singled it out for praise. Critics routinely praised Bedelia's performance and lamented that she was underused, in favor of McClane's and Powell's relationship. (Note: Attributed to multiple references:) Schickel highlighted a scene in which McClane confesses his sins to Powell before rescuing his wife, robbing their marital reunion of meaning. Ebert and Schickel both felt that only McClane's and Powell's characters were developed. The film's success was credited to the remote relationships built between Willis, Rickman, and Veljohnson, by Mike Cidoni. Huffhines and Mills credited the performances with anchoring the film. Ebert focused his criticism on the police captain (portrayed by Gleason), citing the character as an example of a "willfully useless and dumb" obstruction that wasted screen time and weakened the plot. Thomas commended the casting of several minority actors.

The action and violence were criticized by many reviewers. (Note: Attributed to multiple references:) Kevin Thomas said the film had plot holes and lacked credibility. He believed it was the result of a calculated effort to please the broadest possible audience, and concluded that it had squandered its potential as an intelligent thriller for "numbing" violence and carnage. Canby offered a similar sentiment, suggesting the film would appeal only to audiences that required a constant stream of explosions and loud noises. He described it as a "nearly perfect movie for our time", designed to appeal to audiences Canby described as "kidults"—adults with the mindset of children. One violent scene, in which Powell saves McClane by shooting Karl, was singled out. Schickel believed it to be a cynical scene that undermined the humanity formed between McClane and Powell, by having Powell find redemption for his own mistakes through violence. Hinson believed the audience was deliberately manipulated into cheering for the act. Writing for The New York Times, James said the film offered fun escapism while relying on action clichés, but Hinson countered that despite the relentless thrills, the film was not enjoyable.

Reviews identified allusions in Die Hard to films such as The Towering Inferno and The Poseidon Adventure (1972), Alien (1979), Aliens, and RoboCop (1987). (Note: Attributed to multiple references:) Kehr said Die Hard emulated Alien and RoboCop by developing a humorous and sentimental design that perfected the action genre, but in doing so it lacked a personality of its own. Writing for the Poughkeepsie Journal, Cidoni felt Die Hard made previous action blockbusters such as Predator, Missing in Action (1984), and Rambo look like "tupperware parties".

Die Hard was one of several 1988 films labeled "morally objectionable" by the Roman Catholic Church, along with The Last Temptation of Christ, Bull Durham and A Fish Called Wanda. Robert Davi saw the film with Schwarzenegger; Schwarzenegger was positive, but did not like Davi's character narrative, saying, "You were heroic! And now you've turned into an idiot!"

=== Accolades ===
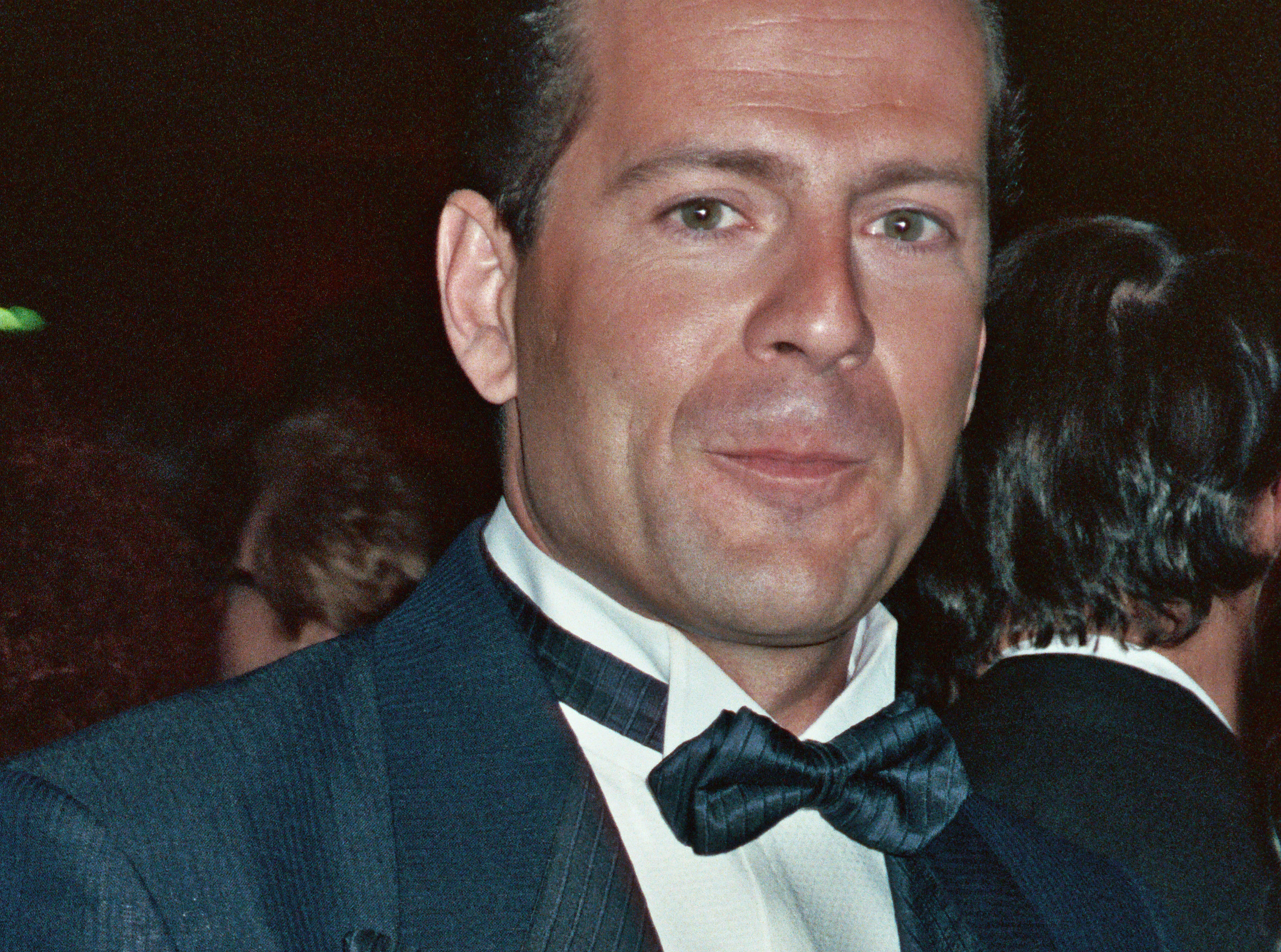
Bruce Willis in 1989 at the 61st Academy Awards

At the 1989 Academy Awards, Die Hard was nominated for Best Film Editing for Frank J. Urioste and John F. Link; Best Visual Effects for Richard Edlund, Al DiSarro, Brent Boates and Thaine Morris; Best Sound Effects Editing for Stephen Hunter Flick and Richard Shorr; and Best Sound for Don J. Bassman, Kevin F. Cleary, Richard Overton and Al Overton Jr. Michael Kamen won a BMI TV/Film Music Award for his work on the score.

== Post-release ==
=== Home media ===
Die Hard was released on home video on January 26, 1989. It was a popular rental, debuting as the third-most rented film on the early February rental charts, rising to number one the following week. It spent six of its first seven weeks in release at number one until it was replaced by A Fish Called Wanda at the end of March.

Die Hard was released on DVD in 1999 as part of a collection with its sequels Die Hard 2 (1990) and Die Hard with a Vengeance (1995). It was released separately as a special edition DVD in 2001, including commentary by McTiernan, De Govia, and Edlund, and deleted scenes, trailers and behind-the-scenes images. It was released on Blu-ray in 2007. Die Hard: The Nakatomi Plaza Collection was released in 2015, collecting all five Die Hard films on Blu-ray in a container shaped like Nakatomi Plaza. For its 30th anniversary in 2018, a remastered 4K resolution version was released on Ultra HD Blu-ray; the set also includes a standard Blu-ray and digital download. A limited-edition SteelBook case version was also released.

=== Other media ===
Die Hard merchandise includes clothing, Funko Pops, coloring and activity books, crockery, Christmas jumpers and ornaments, and an illustrated Christmas book retelling the film. A third-person shooter video game, Die Hard, was released in 1989 for the Commodore 64 and Windows. Different top-down shooter versions were released for the TurboGrafx-16 and the Nintendo Entertainment System (NES). The TurboGrafx-16 edition begins with McClane fighting terrorists in a jungle; the NES version offers a "foot meter" that slows McClane's movements after he repeatedly steps on shattered glass.

Die Hard Trilogy (1996), a popular game for the PlayStation, adapted the first three Die Hard films. In 1997, the Japanese arcade game Dynamite Deka was redesigned and released in western territories as Die Hard Arcade. Players choose either McClane or secondary character Chris Thompsen to battle through Nakatomi Plaza, defeat terrorists led by White Fang, and rescue the President's daughter. Two first-person shooters were released in 2002: Die Hard: Nakatomi Plaza, which recreates the events of Die Hard, and Die Hard: Vendetta, which serves as a narrative sequel to the film, pitting McClane against Gruber's son Piet.

Die Hard: The Ultimate Visual History—a book chronicling the development of the Die Hard film series—was released in 2018 to coincide with the film's 30th anniversary. A board game based on the film was released in 2019. Developed by USAopoly, Die Hard: The Nakatomi Heist casts up to four players as McClane, Gruber, and his terrorists, each vying to complete their opposing tasks.

== Thematic analysis ==
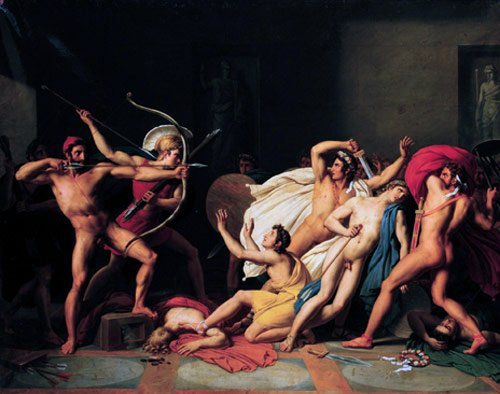
An 1812 painting by Joseph-Ferdinand Lancrenon of Odysseus, aided by Telemachus, preparing to slaughter his wife's suitors. Alexander Boon compared Odysseus's tale to John McClane's quest to rescue his wife from the terrorists.

Die Hard has been described by critics such as Richard Brody and Chris Hewitt as a story about obtaining redemption through violence. McClane comes to Los Angeles to save his marriage, but makes the same mistakes that drove Holly away; Brody and Hewitt suggest that it is only after McClane defeats the terrorists through violence that their marriage is seemingly reconciled. Similarly, Powell is haunted after accidentally shooting a child and finds redemption by drawing his gun to shoot Karl. Several male characters who are driven by rage or ego suffer for it including the FBI agents, Karl, Ellis, and McClane who nearly loses Holly by showing off after shooting Gruber. Ebert notes the more even-tempered characters—often African American—fare better. McClane identifies himself as a Roman Catholic, a religion requiring penance to earn redemption. Brody said that McClane endures physical punishment, including his feet being cut by glass shards to create bloody "stigmata". In making these sacrifices, he salvages his family. In this sense, McClane can be seen as a modern, working-class Christ-like figure.

Alexander Boon compares McClane violently reclaiming his wife to the Greek figure Odysseus slaughtering his wife's suitors. McClane is rewarded for his masculinity, despite demonstrating negative male traits. Jeffrey Brown believed McClane's undershirt emphasizes his masculine physical form. This outfit is worn by other action characters like Rambo, and female characters displaying masculine traits such as Rachel McLish (Aces: Iron Eagle III) and Linda Hamilton (Terminator 2: Judgment Day). Powell and Argyle are not McClane's physical equals but they prioritize relationships, and when called on to act, they succeed. McClane possesses an imposing physicality but is clumsy and reliant on improvisation, and succeeds only because of the relationships with his allies. It is McClane and Powell's relationship that is particularly instrumental to McClane's success. The pair share a non-romantic intimacy that enables McClane to confess his failings as a husband in a way he did not with Holly, allowing McClane to grow as a person. Gruber fails because he is isolated, self-interested, and sacrifices his team for his own survival.

Peter Parshall observed that McClane and Gruber are reflections of each other. Brody contrasts McClane—an all-American stereotype compared to Western cowboy stars like Roy Rogers, John Wayne and Gary Cooper—to Gruber, a classically educated, European villain who refers to America as a "bankrupt" culture. Elizabeth Abele wrote that when compared to the superheroes of the previous decade in films like Superman (1978) and Raiders of the Lost Ark (1981), McClane is portrayed as physically but realistically masculine, conveying the idea of a "real man" who possesses independent, intrinsic strength. According to Justin Chang and Mark Olsen, this can be seen as a response to Reaganism—the political positions of United States president Ronald Reagan—promoting values of the American dream, self-reliance, initiative, and technological advancement.

Willis believes that if given the choice, McClane would pass the responsibility of dealing with the terrorists onto anyone else, but he is ultimately compelled to serve as a reluctant hero. When the character is introduced, he is wearing his wedding ring. Scott Tobias wrote this serves as a symbol of his marital commitment. Holly is presented as the opposite; she uses her maiden name and is not wearing her wedding ring. Instead, she is gifted a Rolex watch by her employers, serving as a symbol of her commitment to her job and the division in her marriage. When McClane unclasps the watch at the film's end to free Holly from Gruber's grasp, the totem of their separation is broken, and they appear to have reconciled.

Parshall describes the negative portrayals of female characters in Die Hard. They appear sexualized in pin-up posters, suggest drinking while pregnant, or are away from their families on Christmas Eve at a work function. Holly takes a position of authority following her boss's death, but that power is delegated to her by Gruber, and it is used in traditionally feminine ways, to care for her colleagues. Takagi is replaced in Holly's life with a different dominant male, McClane. Darin Payne wrote that Die Hard reflects the contemporary decline of men as the main household earner as more women joined the workforce and blue-collar jobs were being lost to foreign countries. In response, an American cowboy saves the day, rescuing his captured wife from a foreign-owned tower.

Die Hard has elements that are anti-government, anti-bureaucracy and anti-corporation. A terrorist asserts McClane cannot harm him because there are rules for policemen, rules he intends to exploit. McClane responds "so my captain keeps telling me", suggesting that he operates outside of bureaucratically approved procedures. Brody wrote that the police often present a bigger obstacle than the terrorists. They believe they are in control of events, unaware the terrorists have already anticipated their every action. The police chief is portrayed as incompetent, and the FBI is shown to be indifferent to the lives of the hostages as long as they kill the terrorists. McClane is an everyman fighting against terrorists who are dressed like elite big-city workers. As Ellis states, the only difference between the corporate employees and the terrorists is that he uses a pen and Gruber uses a gun. The police, the FBI, and an intrusive journalist are each punished for standing in McClane's way. Parshall noted the Christmas setting can be seen as an attack on traditional societal values. The corporation hosts a party on Christmas Eve, keeping employees away from their families, and the villains cynically appropriate Christmas iconographies. By defeating them, McClane upholds tradition and defends society.

Alongside the mainly German group of terrorists, Nakatomi Plaza is owned by a Japanese corporation, and the hostages are American. Brody identified this as reflecting American anxieties about foreign powers at a time when Japanese technology firms threatened to dominate the American technology industry. When McClane prevails, the suggestion is that American ingenuity will prevail. America's old enemies, Germany and Japan, are portrayed as having forsaken their integrity in the pursuit of financial gain. Dave Kehr said the film embodies a resentful 1980s "blue-collar rage" against feminists, yuppies, the media, the authorities and foreign nationals. Brody notes that the film can also be considered progressive in its portrayal of its African American characters, as cast members VelJohnson, Gilyard, and White are featured in prominent and important roles.

The A.V. Club noted that unlike many other 1980s films, Die Hard is not an allegory for the Vietnam War. The film mocks the idea when one FBI agent remarks that their helicopter assault is reminiscent of the war; his partner responds that at the time he was only in middle school. Even so, Empire believed the film references Vietnam by showcasing an ill-equipped local taking on highly equipped foreign invaders; this time America wins. Drew Ayers described the complex layout of Nakatomi Plaza as analogous to the concealing jungles of Vietnam.

== Legacy ==
=== Influence on the film industry ===
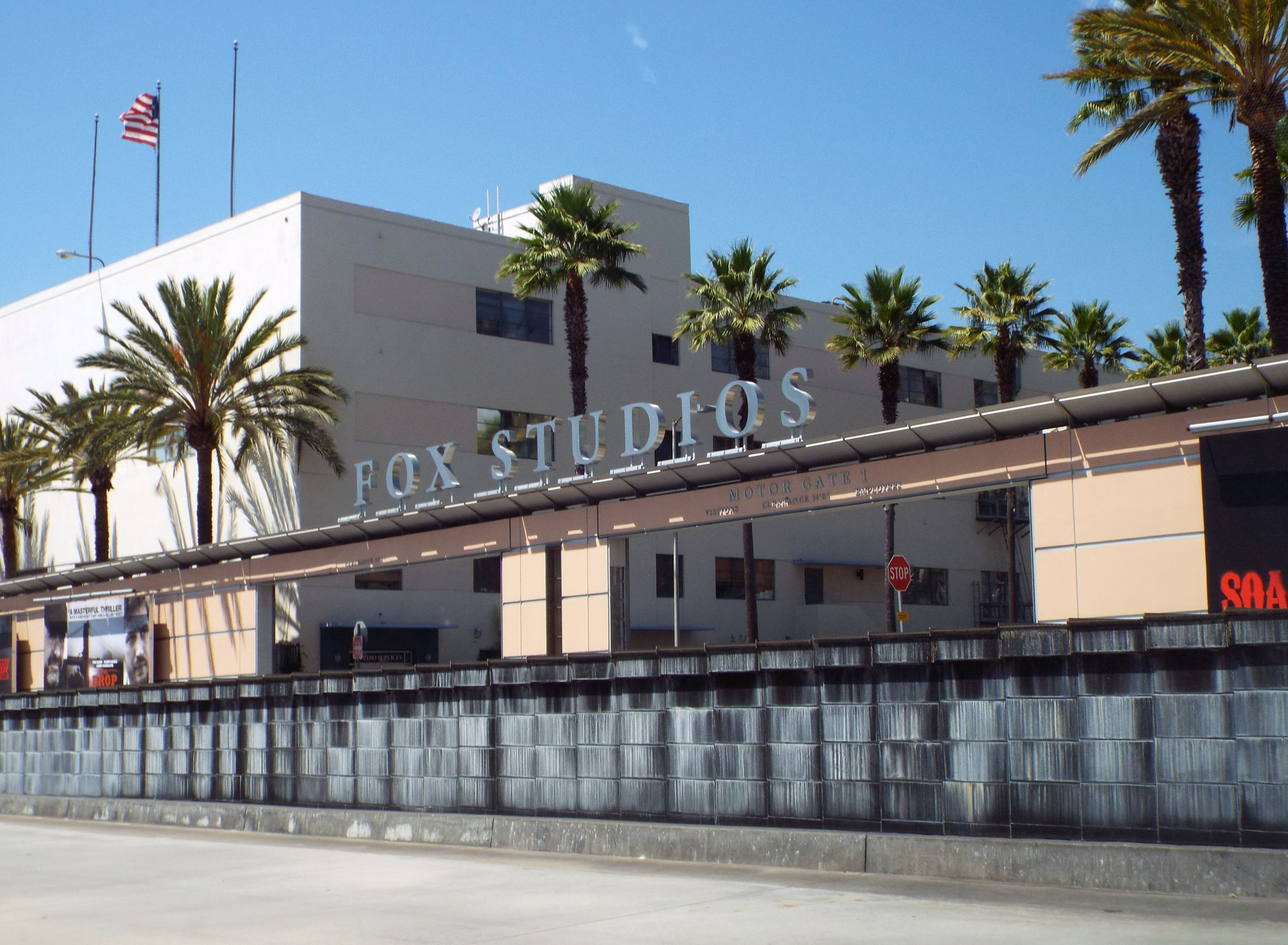
The entrance of the Fox Studio Lot in Century City, where a giant mural of John McClane crawling through a vent was erected as part of the film's 25th-anniversary celebration in 2013

Before Die Hard's release, Hollywood action films often starred muscle-bound men like Schwarzenegger and Stallone, who portrayed invincible, infallible, catchphrase-spouting heroes in unrealistic settings. Willis's portrayal of John McClane redefined the action genre, presenting a normal person with an average physique completely counter to that archetype. He is failing, both personally and professionally, and serves as a vulnerable, identifiable hero who openly sobs, admits his fear of death, and sustains lasting damage. Importantly, his one-liners do not come from a place of superiority over his foes, but as a nervous reaction to the extreme situation in which he finds himself, which he is able to overcome only through enduring suffering and using his own initiative.

Similarly, Rickman's portrayal of Gruber redefined action villains who had previously been bland figures or eccentric madmen. Gruber ushered in the clever nemesis; he is an educated, intelligent villain, who serves as the antithesis of the hero. He has been referred to as one of the most iconic villains in the genre. Empire magazine called Gruber one of the finest villains since Darth Vader. Rickman described the role as a "huge event" in his life. Though other more typical 1980s-style action films were released, the genre gradually shifted to a focus on smaller, more confined settings, everyman heroes, and charming villains with competent plans.

Die Hard raised Willis from television stardom to worldwide recognition and brought fame to Rickman. Willis's salary was seen as the peak of the 1980s bidding wars between new and old managers vying for jobs. The New York Times described it as the salary equivalent of an "earthquake" and MGM/UA chairman Alan Ladd Jr. said that it threw "the business out of whack ... like everybody else in town, I was stunned." It was seen as the most substantial change to salaries since Dustin Hoffman was paid $5.5 million to star in Tootsie (1982) at a time when top salaries ranged from $2 million–$3 million. It was expected that salaries for major stars would increase significantly to ensure they were paid more than a newer star like Willis. McTiernan transitioned his success into directing an adaptation of one of his favorite novels, The Hunt for Red October (1990). VelJohnson's performance resulted in his casting in the 1989–1998 sitcom Family Matters.

=== Cultural influence ===
In 2017, Die Hard was selected by the United States Library of Congress to be preserved in the National Film Registry for being "culturally, historically, or aesthetically significant". In July 2007, Bruce Willis donated the undershirt worn in the film to the National Museum of American History at the Smithsonian Institution. The blood and sweat-stained shirt is considered iconic, an emblem of McClane's difference from archetypal, invincible heroes. Fox Plaza has become a popular tourist attraction, although the building itself cannot be toured. A floor used for filming became Ronald Reagan's office. When his head of staff toured the under-construction area, it was littered with broken glass and cartridge cases. A giant mural depicting McClane's crawl through a Nakatomi Plaza vent was erected at the Fox Studio lot in Century City to celebrate the film's 25th anniversary in 2013.

One of the most influential films of the 1980s, Die Hard served as the blueprint for action films that came after, especially throughout the 1990s. The term "Die Hard on/in a..." has become shorthand to describe a lone, everyman hero who must overcome an overwhelming opposing force in a relatively small and confined location. Examples include: Under Siege (1992, "Die Hard on a battleship"); Cliffhanger (1993, "Die Hard on a mountain"); Speed (1994, "Die Hard on a bus"); and Con Air or Air Force One (1997, "Die Hard on a plane"). Willis himself recalled being pitched a film that was "Die Hard in a skyscraper". He said he was sure it had already been done. It was not until the 1996 action-thriller film The Rock ("Die Hard on Alcatraz Island"), that the tone of action films changed significantly, and the increasing use of CGI effects allowed films to move beyond the limitations of real locations and practical stunts. Writing for The Guardian in 2018, Scott Tobias observed that none of these later films readily captured the complete effectiveness of the Die Hard story.

The film has been a source of inspiration for filmmakers including: Lexi Alexander, Darren Aronofsky, Brad Bird, Joe Carnahan, Gareth Evans, Barry Jenkins, Joe Lynch, Paul Scheer, Brian Taylor, Dan Trachtenberg, Colin Trevorrow, and Paul W. S. Anderson. During the COVID-19 pandemic, it was among the action films director James Gunn recommended people watch. The film's popularity has seen it referenced across a wide variety of media, including TV shows, films; video games; music; and novels. It has even been referenced in media targeted at children. Willis cameos as McClane in the 1993 parody film Loaded Weapon 1.

There has been much debate over whether Die Hard is a Christmas film. Those in favor argue that the Christmas setting is sufficient to qualify it as a Christmas film. Those opposed argue that it is an action film whose events happen to take place at Christmas. A 2017 YouGov poll of more than 5,000 British citizens determined that only 31% believed that Die Hard is a Christmas film; those who did skewed under the age of 24, while those opposed were mainly over 50. A similar 2018 Morning Consult poll of 2,200 American citizens determined that only 25% supported its status as a Christmas film. Those aged between 30 and 44, who were young during the peak of the film's popularity, were most in favor. De Souza and Stuart support it being a Christmas film, while Willis feels it is not. On the film's 30th anniversary in 2018, 20th Century Fox stated that it was "the greatest Christmas story ever told", releasing a re-edited Die Hard trailer that portrays it as a traditional Christmas film. According to De Souza, Silver predicted the film would be played at Christmastime for years.

=== Critical reassessment ===
Die Hard is now considered one of the greatest action films ever made. On the film's 30th-anniversary in 2018, The Hollywood Reporter wrote that Die Hard was easily one of the most influential films in the action genre, whose influence could still be seen in contemporary films. The Guardian and the British Film Institute regard it as the "quintessential" American action film, the latter calling it one of the ten greatest action films of all time. Deadline Hollywood labeled it a staple of the action genre, that launched a "classic" franchise. Writing for Vanity Fair, K. Austin Collins said that despite the number of times he had viewed the film, it remained a persistently satisfying and well-crafted piece. It is listed in the 2003 film reference book 1001 Movies You Must See Before You Die, which says that the film "...effectively redefines the action movie as one-man-army."

A retrospective review by The A.V. Club said that Willis's everyman persona is key to the film's success. Rickman said he believed it had continued to find fans decades after its release because it was delivered with wit and style. Contemporary review aggregator Rotten Tomatoes offers a 94% approval rating from the aggregated reviews of 84 critics, with an average rating of 8.6/10. The consensus reads, "Its many imitators (and sequels) have never come close to matching the taut thrills of the definitive holiday action classic." The film also has a score of 72 out of 100 on Metacritic based on 14 critics, indicating "generally favorable" reviews. Readers of Rolling Stone ranked it the number ten action film of all time in a 2015 poll, while Empire readers voted it number 20 in 2017.

In 2001, the American Film Institute (AFI) ranked Die Hard number 39 on its 100 Years... 100 Thrills list recognizing the most "heart-pounding" films. In 2008, Empire ranked it number 29 on its list of the 500 Greatest Movies of all Time. In 2014, The Hollywood Reporter's entertainment industry-voted ranking named it the eighty-third-best film of all time. The film's characters have also been recognized. In 2003, the AFI ranked Hans Gruber number 46 on its 100 Years... 100 Heroes and Villains list. In 2006, Empire ranked McClane number 12 on its list of its '100 Greatest Movie Characters'; Gruber followed at number 17.

Several publications have listed it as one of the greatest action films of all time, including: number one by Empire, IGN and Entertainment Weekly; number 10 by Time Out New York; number 14 by The Guardian; number 18 by Men's Health and unranked by Complex, Esquire and Evening Standard. Adding to the debate over Die Hard's status as a Christmas film, it has appeared on several lists of the top holiday films, including at number one by Empire and San Francisco Gate, number four by Entertainment Weekly and The Hollywood Reporter, number five by Digital Spy, and number eight in a Radio Times readers' poll.

== Sequels ==
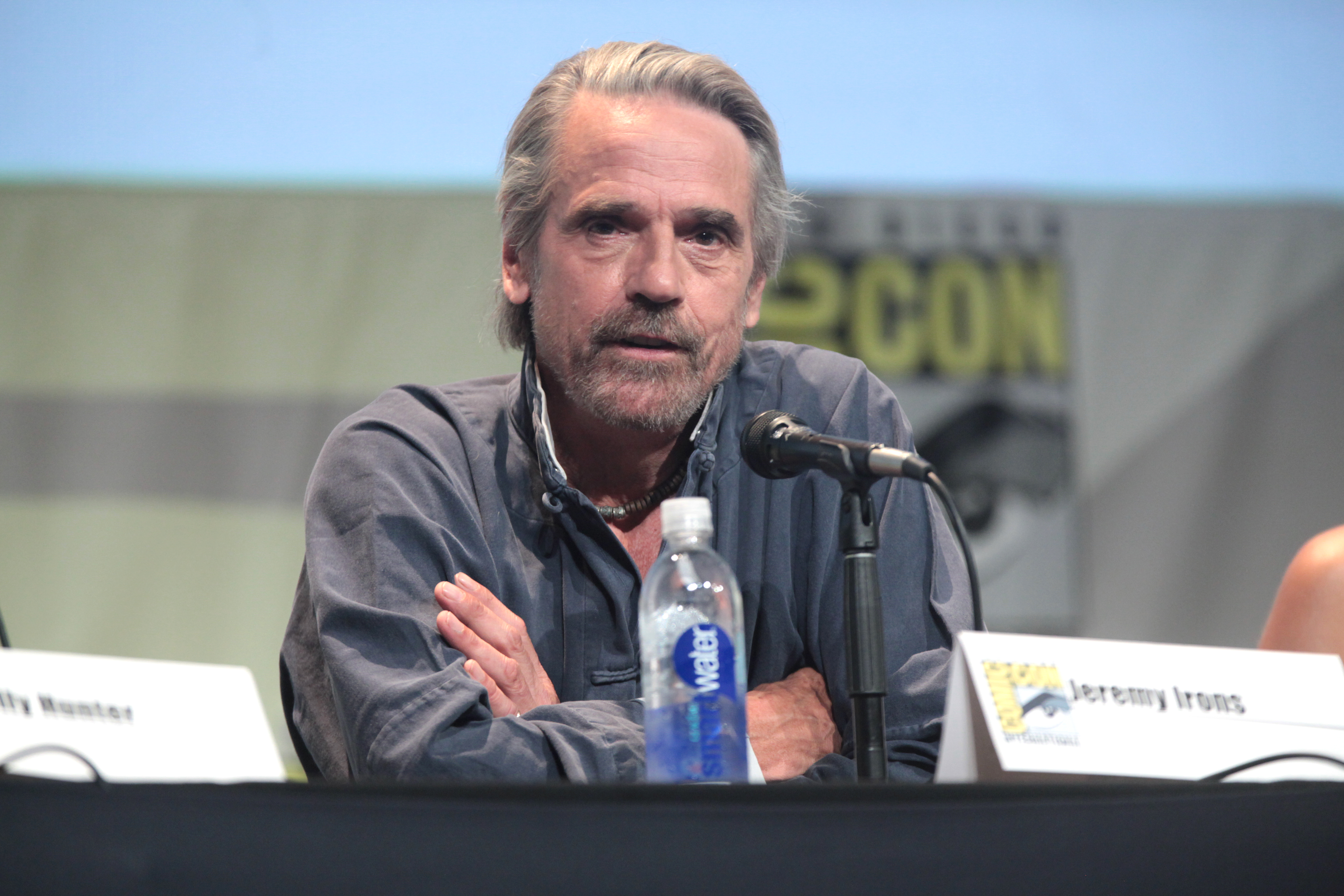
Jeremy Irons (pictured 2015) portrayed Hans Gruber's brother Simon in 1995's Die Hard with a Vengeance.

The success of Die Hard spawned four film sequels, beginning with Die Hard 2 in 1990, which was rushed into production to capitalize on the original's popularity. Stuart and McTiernan did not return for the film; McTiernan was replaced by Renny Harlin. Die Hard 2 is the last film in the series to feature the involvement of De Souza, Bedelia, VelJohnson, Atherton, Silver, and Gordon. Silver and Gordon fell out with each other and Willis after filming concluded, delaying the production of a third film—Die Hard with a Vengeance (1995). This sequel also took longer to develop because of the difficulty in scripting an original scenario that had not already been used by one of Die Hard's many imitators. McTiernan returned to direct Die Hard with a Vengeance, his only other film in the series. The film's plot pits McClane against Hans Gruber's brother, Simon (Jeremy Irons).

Live Free or Die Hard—also known as Die Hard 4.0—was released in 2007. In it, McClane teams up with a hacker (Justin Long) to fight cyber terrorists led by Thomas Gabriel (Timothy Olyphant). The film was controversial for its studio-mandate to target younger audiences, requiring much of the violence and profanity prevalent in the rest of the series to be excluded. Even so, it was financially and critically successful. The fifth film in the series, A Good Day to Die Hard (2013), teams McClane up with his son Jack for an adventure in Moscow. The film was considered a financial success. It was derided by critics and fans, and the negative reception stalled the franchise. A Good Day to Die Hard is considered the weakest entry in the series. Although Willis expressed interest in a sixth and final film, plans for a prequel film were cancelled following the acquisition of 21st Century Fox by Disney in 2019, and Willis retired from acting in 2022, after being diagnosed with aphasia, a condition which affects his ability to communicate.

Die Hard remains the most critically acclaimed film in the series based on aggregated reviews. As the sequels progressed, they increasingly hewed closer to the 1980s-style action films Die Hard had eschewed, McClane becoming an invincible killing machine surviving damage that would have killed his original incarnation. NPR called Die Hard a "genuinely great" movie whose legacy has been tarnished by lackluster sequels. According to The Guardian, the evolution of the action genre can be tracked by the differences in each Die Hard sequel, as McClane evolves from human into a superhuman. A comic book prequel and sequel have been released: Die Hard: Year One is set in 1976 and chronicles McClane as a rookie officer; A Million Ways to Die Hard is set 30 years after Die Hard, and features a retired McClane seeking out a serial killer.
