= Roderick Thorp =

American writer (1936–1999)

- Thorp in 1977
- Born: Roderick Mayne Thorp Jr. September 1, 1936; Bronx, New York City, United States
- Died: April 28, 1999 (aged 62); Oxnard, California, United States
- Occupations: Novelist, writer
- Writing career
- Genre: Crime
- Notable works: The Detective; Nothing Lasts Forever

Roderick Mayne Thorp Jr. (September 1, 1936 – April 28, 1999) was an American novelist specializing mainly in police procedurals and crime novels. His novel The Detective was adapted into a film of the same name in 1968. Thorp is also known for its sequel, the bestselling novel Nothing Lasts Forever, which later served as the basis for the film Die Hard. Thus Thorp became a creator of the entire media franchise of the same name. Two other Thorp novels, Rainbow Drive and Devlin, were also adapted into TV movies.

== Early life ==
Thorp was born in the Bronx, New York City. As a young college graduate, Thorp worked at a detective agency owned by his father. He would later teach literature and lecture on creative writing at schools and universities in New Jersey and California, and also wrote articles for newspapers and magazines.

== Death ==
On April 28, 1999, Thorp died of a heart attack in Oxnard, California at the age of 62.

== Filmography ==
- The Detective (1968) (novel)
- Die Hard (1988) (novel)
- Rainbow Drive (1990) (book)
- Devlin (1992) (book)
- Deep Down (1994) (cast)

== Bibliography ==
- Into the Forest (1961)
- The Detective (1966)
- Dionysus (1969)
- The Music of Their Laughter: An American Album (1970)
- Wives: An Investigation (1971)
- Slaves (1973)
- The Circle of Love (1974)
- Westfield (1977)
- Nothing Lasts Forever (1979) (reissued as Die Hard)
- Jenny and Barnum: A Novel of Love (1981)
- Rainbow Drive (1986)
- Devlin (1988)
- River: A Novel of the Green River Killings (1995)
