= Nothing Lasts Forever (Thorp novel) =

1979 thriller novel by Roderick Thorp

- First edition
- Author: Roderick Thorp
- Language: English
- Genre: Thriller novel
- Publisher: W. W. Norton & Company
- Publication date: 1979
- Publication place: United States
- Media type: Print (hardback & paperback)
- ISBN: 0-393-01249-2
- OCLC: 5101628
- Dewey Decimal: 813/.5/4
- LC Class: PZ4.T55 No 1979 PS3570.H67
- Preceded by: The Detective

Nothing Lasts Forever is a 1979 action thriller novel by American author Roderick Thorp, a sequel to his 1966 novel The Detective. It continues the story of detective Joseph Leland, now retired and having divorced from his late wife, as he goes to Los Angeles to reconcile with his estranged daughter, only to be caught up in a hostage crisis at the office complex where she works and fight a team of politically-motivated European terrorists to save her, which severely impairs his mental state.

The novel is mostly known through its 1988 film adaptation Die Hard starring Bruce Willis.

== Plot ==
Retired NYPD detective and recovering alcoholic Joe Leland is visiting the 40-story office headquarters of the Klaxon Oil Corporation in Los Angeles on Christmas Eve, where his daughter Stephanie Leland Gennaro works. On the flight to LA, he makes a connection with airline stewardess Kathi Logan before landing, whereupon he is picked up by a limousine and driven to the Klaxon tower.

While Leland is waiting for his daughter's Christmas party to end, German Autumn–era terrorist Anton "Little Tony the Red" Gruber and his heavily armed team of twelve seize the skyscraper and take all 74 guests hostage, including Stephanie's daughter and son. Leland knows about Gruber, the son of a Nazi SS officer living off the riches his father made as a war profiteer from World War II, through a counter-terrorist conference he attended years prior and can recall much of his personal information from his dossier. Barefoot after an exercise to relieve the stress of jetlag, Leland slips away during the chaos of the takeover and watches in secret as Gruber and the terrorists kill Rivers, the CEO of Klaxon, and proceed to steal documents that will publicly expose Klaxon's dealings with Chile's junta. They also intend to deprive Klaxon of the proceeds of the corrupt deal of $6 million in cash by attempting to access a safe.

Leland agrees with the terrorists' motive, but not their actions, and ends up facing them single-handedly in order to save Stephanie. He kills them one-by-one, beginning with Hans, brother of Gruber's second-in-command Karl, and taking his automatic weapon and handheld radio. Reaching out to the LAPD from the roof but monitored by Gruber, Leland eludes the terrorists by crawling through the tower's ventilation system, then gets the police's attention by throwing another terrorist's corpse out the side of the building. As the police send reinforcements, Leland requests to contact Kathi as well, and she is brought to the scene as a witness.

After Leland kills more terrorists, he takes some plastic explosives and detonators from a female terrorist's corpse. Despite being forced to walk barefoot on broken glass as a trap laid by the terrorists, Leland establishes a friendly contact with police sergeant Al Powell, to whom he explains the crisis. The police attempt to fight back against the terrorists despite Leland warning them not to do so, and he sends an improvised chair bomb falling down an elevator shaft to kill some of the terrorists on a lower floor. Deputy Chief Dwayne T. Robinson, Powell's belligerent supervisor, takes over the situation, believing that Leland is one of the terrorists despite Powell's argument to the contrary.

Stephanie's sleazy fellow executive and extramarital lover Harry Ellis attempts to negotiate peace with Gruber by promising to convince Leland to surrender, but Gruber shoots him dead when Leland refuses. Cornered by assault helicopters on the roof, which the terrorists have rigged to detonate so they can fake their deaths, Leland escapes by rappelling down the side of the building with a fire hose just before the roof explodes, then shoots his way back into the tower and untethers himself from the hose before its spool can drag him back out. Enraged by Hans's death, Karl sets out to personally kill Leland, who seemingly kills him. Gruber figures out who Leland's daughter is and contacts her by radio while reporters throng Kathi with questions.

With most of the terrorists killed and most of the hostages evacuated, a battered and bloodthirsty Leland locates and confronts Gruber, who holds his daughter hostage. Stephanie apologizes to her father for her role in the deal that sparked the terrorist attack and his involvement. Leland appears to surrender but quickly draws his Browning pistol taped to his back and wounds Gruber, who shoots Stephanie in the stomach as he stumbles through a window and falls to his death, taking her with him. Blaming Klaxon for the terrorist attack and his daughter's death, Leland throws the cash out of the window himself. He finds the last terrorist, a young woman, who surrenders before he kills her. Once Leland leaves the building, Karl returns, having survived, and starts a shooting rampage, killing several police officers (including Robinson), reporters, and a doctor in the process, as well as injuring Leland, before Powell finally kills him. Leland falls unconscious as he receives medical care.

== Characters ==
- Joseph Leland – an aging, retired New York Police detective and World War II veteran
- Stephanie Gennaro – Leland's estranged daughter and an important Klaxon Oil executive
- Anton "Little Tony The Red" Gruber – the ruthless leader of the terrorists, who orchestrates the siege on Klaxon's headquarters
- Al Powell – a young Los Angeles Police sergeant sent to the Klaxon tower to check on an emergency call made by Leland, with whom he remotely communicates during the siege
- Dwayne Robinson – the Deputy Chief of the Los Angeles Police sent to take charge of the situation at hand
- Karl – Gruber's second-in-command
- Mr. Rivers – the president of Klaxon and Stephanie's boss
- Harry Ellis – a sleazy Klaxon executive with whom Stephanie is having an affair

== Background and film adaptation ==
In 1975, author Roderick Thorp saw the film The Towering Inferno, about a skyscraper which catches on fire. After seeing the film, Thorp fell asleep and had a dream of seeing a man being chased through a skyscraper by men with guns. He woke up and later took that idea and turned it into the Detective sequel, Nothing Lasts Forever.

Roderick Thorp decided for the book to be a sequel to The Detective so it could be made into a follow-up film starring Frank Sinatra as Joe Leland. Thus, the storyline hypothetically takes place some decades after its predecessor (as Leland was age thirty-six in that novel but is retired by the sequel). Sinatra declined the offer. It was then offered to Arnold Schwarzenegger, Sylvester Stallone and a number of other actors until Bruce Willis signed on for the role.

The film was titled Die Hard and was altered to be a stand-alone film with no connections to Thorp's first novel. Some of the biggest changes in the film included making the protagonist a younger detective in the middle of his career, the changing of his name from Joe Leland to John McClane, changing the person he visits at the skyscraper to his estranged wife, and the American Klaxon Oil Corporation becoming the Japanese Nakatomi Corporation. The terrorists in the film have turned into high-stake professional thieves seeking $640 million in negotiable bearer bonds kept in the building's vault, and are only posing as terrorists to draw attention away from the robbery. In the film, most of them are German, including their leader, Gruber, whose given name is changed to Hans, in reference to Karl's brother, whose name is changed to Tony. The rest are of varying ethnicities and nationalities (French, Italian, Chinese, and American), and they are all men, in contrast to the novel. The ending is also different: in the novel, Leland's daughter is killed, whereas in the film, John McClane saves his wife, Holly.

Similarly, Willis explained in a 1988 interview with KXAS-TV's entertainment reporter Bobbie Wygant that he acted out McClane with enough fear, anxiety, and vulnerability to make audiences believe that he could indeed possibly be killed because of what happened in the story, as Joseph Leland could possibly have died of his injuries in the book.

== Reception ==
The Los Angeles Times called Nothing Lasts Forever "a ferocious, bloody, raging book so single-mindedly brilliant in concept and execution it should be read at a single sitting".

== Sources ==
- Thorp, Roderick (1979). Nothing Lasts Forever. ISBN 978-1-935169-18-5.
