= List of Western subgenres =

The Western is a genre set in the American frontier and commonly associated with folk tales of the Western United States, particularly the Southwestern United States, as well as Northern Mexico and Western Canada. It is commonly referred to as the "Old West" or the "Wild West" and depicted in Western media as a hostile, sparsely populated frontier in a state of near-total lawlessness patrolled by outlaws, sheriffs, and numerous other stock gunslinger characters. Western narratives often concern the gradual attempts to tame the crime-ridden American West using wider themes of justice, freedom, rugged individualism, manifest destiny, and the national history and identity of the United States.

Within the larger scope of the Western genre, there are several recognized subgenres. Some subgenres, such as spaghetti Westerns, maintain standard Western settings and plots, while others take the Western theme and archetypes into different supergenres, such as neo-Westerns or space Westerns.

For a time, Westerns made in countries other than the United States were often labeled by foods associated with the culture, such as spaghetti Westerns (Italy), meat pie Westerns (Australia), ramen Westerns (Asia), and masala Westerns (India).

== Acid Western ==
Film critic Jonathan Rosenbaum refers to a makeshift 1960s and 1970s genre called the acid Western, associated with Dennis Hopper, Jim McBride, and Rudy Wurlitzer, as well as films such as Monte Hellman's The Shooting (1966), Alejandro Jodorowsky's bizarre experimental film El Topo (The Mole) (1970), and Robert Downey Sr.'s Greaser's Palace (1972). The 1970 film El Topo is an allegorical cult Western and underground film about the eponymous character, a violent black-clad gunfighter, and his quest for enlightenment. The film is filled with bizarre characters and occurrences, use of maimed and dwarf performers, and heavy doses of Christian symbolism and Eastern philosophy. Some spaghetti Westerns also crossed over into the acid Western genre, such as Enzo G. Castellari's mystical Keoma (1976), a Western reworking of Ingmar Bergman's The Seventh Seal (1957).

More recent acid Westerns include Alex Cox's Walker (1987) and Jim Jarmusch's Dead Man (1995). Rosenbaum describes the acid Western as "formulating a chilling, savage frontier poetry to justify its hallucinated agenda"; ultimately, he says, the acid Western expresses a counterculture sensibility to critique and replace capitalism with alternative forms of exchange.

== Blaxploitation Western ==
Many blaxploitation films, particularly ones involving Fred Williamson, have incorporated a Western setting within them. They are often characterized by excessive violence, stilted dialog, and macho heroes. Examples include Soul Soldier (1970), Buck and the Preacher (1972), The Legend of Nigger Charley (1972), The Soul of Nigger Charley (1973), Thomasine & Bushrod (1974), Boss Nigger (1975), Adiós Amigo (1975), and Posse (1993).

== Comedy Western ==
This subgenre is imitative in style to mock, comment on, or trivialize the Western genre's established traits, subjects, auteurs' styles, or some other target by means of humorous, satiric, or ironic imitation or parody. A prime example of comedy Western includes The Paleface (1948), which makes a satirical effort to "send up Owen Wister's novel The Virginian and all the cliches of the Western from the fearless hero to the final shootout on Main Street". The Paleface "features a cowardly hero known as "Painless" Peter Potter (Bob Hope), an inept dentist, who often entertains the notion that he is a crack sharpshooter and accomplished Indian fighter".

Other examples include:

- Along Came Jones (1945), in which Gary Cooper spoofed his Western persona
- The Sheepman (1958), with Glenn Ford poking fun at himself
- Cat Ballou (1965), with a drunk Lee Marvin atop a drunk horse
- The Hallelujah Trail (1965)
- Support Your Local Sheriff (1969)
- Support Your Local Gunfighter (1971), sequel to the above
- The Unhanged (1971)
- Blazing Saddles (1974)
- Cannibal! The Musical (1993)

== Contemporary Western or neo-Western ==
Contemporary Western (or neo-Westerns or urban Westerns) have contemporary settings and use Old West themes, archetypes, and motifs, such as a rebellious antihero, open plains and desert landscapes, or gunfights. This also includes the post-Western, with modern settings and "the cowboy cult" that involve the audience's feelings and understanding of Western movies. This subgenre often features Old West-type characters struggling with displacement in a "civilized" world that rejects their outdated brand of justice. Some contemporary Westerns take place in the American West and reveal the progression of the Old West mentality into the late 20th and early 21st centuries; but the genre is not limited to the traditional American West setting. Coogan's Bluff and Midnight Cowboy are examples of urban Westerns set in New York City.

Typical themes of the neo-Western are the lack of rules, with morals guided by the character's or audience's instincts of right and wrong rather than by governance, characters searching for justice, and characters feeling remorse, connecting the neo-Western to the broader Western genre. Other conventions of the genre include displays of competence, which in turn is measured in acts of violence.

Beginning in the postwar era, radio dramas such as Tales of the Texas Rangers (1950–1952), with Joel McCrea, a contemporary detective drama set in Texas, featured many of the characteristics of traditional Westerns. In this period, post-Western precursors to the modern neo-Western films began to appear, such as Nicholas Ray's The Lusty Men (1952) and John Sturges's Bad Day at Black Rock (1955). Examples of the modern "first phase" of neo-Westerns include films such as Lonely Are the Brave (1962) and Hud (1963). The popularity of the subgenre has been resurgent since the release of Joel and Ethan Coen's No Country for Old Men (2007).

The neo-Western subgenre can also be seen in modern American television shows such as Breaking Bad, Justified, and Yellowstone.

== Cultural Westerns ==
=== Andean Western ===
The Andean Western is typically a bandit narrative set in postcolonial Peru. is a new and emerging genre, derived from the Spaghetti Western movement. It is usually set in Peru and other countries in andean South America. The first film under this term was "Pueblo Viejo" in 2015.

=== Australian Western or meat pie Western ===
The Australian Western genre or meat pie Western is set in Australia, especially the Australian Outback or the Australian Bush. The genre borrows from US traditions.

The Tracker is an archetype in this form of Australian Western, with signature scenes of harsh desert environments, and exploration of the themes of rough justice, exploitation of the Indigenous Australians, and the thirst for justice at all costs. Others in this category include Rangle River (1936), Kangaroo, The Kangaroo Kid (1950),The Sundowners (1960), Quigley Down Under (1990), Ned Kelly (1970), The Man from Snowy River (1982), The Proposition (2005), Lucky Country (2009), and Sweet Country (2017).

Mystery Road (2013) is an example of a modern Australian Western, and the Mad Max franchise has inspired many futurist dystopian examples of the Australian Western such as The Rover (2014).

=== Brazilian Western ===
Brazilian Western (also known as Feijoada Western) is a film genre that adapts the conventions of the American Western to the Brazilian cultural context. A subgenre of the Brazilian Western is the nordestern, a film set in the Sertão region of Brazil. The name is a mix of "Western" and "Nordeste", refearing to the Northeastern Brazil. These movies are about banditry, heroes, or folklore of the region.

=== Charro, cabrito, or chili Westerns ===
Charro Westerns, often featuring musical stars, as well as action, have been a standard feature of Mexican cinema since the 1930s. In the 1930s and 1940s, these were typically films about horsemen in rural Mexican society, displaying a set of cultural concerns very different from the Hollywood metanarrative, but the overlap between "charro" movies and Westerns became more apparent in the 1950s, '60s, and '70s. Some examples are Ismael Rodríguez's Los Hermanos del Hierro (1961), Jorge Fons's Cinco Mil Dólares de Recompensa, and Arturo Ripstein's Tiempo de morir. The most important is Alberto Mariscal, great author of El tunco Maclovio, Todo por nada, Los marcados, El juez de la soga, and La chamuscada.

=== Chinese Western ===
The Western is a popular genre in the Asian film industry. Examples of the Chinese Western genre include Millionaires Express (1986), Let the Bullets Fly (2010) and Once Upon a Time in China and America (1997).

=== Dacoit Western ===
The Bollywood film Sholay (1975) was often referred to as a "curry Western". It has also been described as a "dacoit Western", as it combines the conventions of Indian dacoit films such as Mother India (1957) and Gunga Jumna (1961) with those of spaghetti Westerns. Sholay spawned its own genre of "dacoit Western" films in Bollywood during the 1970s.

The first Western films made in India – Kalam Vellum (1970, Tamil), Mosagallaku Mosagadu (1971, Telugu), Ganga (1972, Tamil), and Jakkamma (1972, Tamil) – were based on classic Westerns. Thazhvaram (1990), the Malayalam film directed by Bharathan and written by noted writer M. T. Vasudevan Nair, perhaps most resembles the spaghetti Westerns in terms of production and cinematic techniques. Earlier spaghetti Westerns laid the groundwork for such films as Adima Changala (1971) starring Prem Nazir, a hugely popular zapata spaghetti Western film in Malayalam, and Sholay (1975) Khote Sikkay (1973) and Thai Meethu Sathiyam (1978) are notable curry Westerns. Kodama Simham (1990), a Telugu action film, starring Chiranjeevi and Mohan Babu, was one more addition to the Indo Western genre that fared well at the box office. It was also the first South Indian movie to be dubbed in English as Hunters of the Indian Treasure.

Takkari Donga (2002), starring Telugu actor Mahesh Babu, was applauded by critics, but was average at box office. Quick Gun Murugun (2009), an Indian comedy film that spoofs Indian Western movies, is based on a character created for television promotions at the time of the launch of the music network Channel [V] in 1994, which had cult following. Irumbukkottai Murattu Singam (2010), a Western adventure comedy film, based on cowboy movies and paying homages to the John Wayne, Clint Eastwood, and Jaishankar, was made in Tamil. Laal Kaptaan (2019) is an IndoWestern starring Saif Ali Khan, which is set during the rise of the British Empire in India. Jigarthanda DoubleX (2023) is an Indo western starring S. J. Suryah and Raghava Lawrence in lead roles, Set in the 1970s, it revolves around an upcoming policeman trying to kill a gangster by going undercover as a filmmaker.

=== Euro-Western ===
Euro-Westerns are Western-genre films made in Western Europe. The term can sometimes include the spaghetti Western subgenre. One example of a Euro-Western is the Anglo-Spanish film The Savage Guns (1961). Several Euro-Western films, nicknamed sauerkraut Westerns because they were made in Germany and shot in Yugoslavia, were derived from stories by novelist Karl May, and were film adaptations of May's work. One of the most popular German Western franchises was the Winnetou series, which featured a Native American Apache hero in the lead role. Also in Finland, only a few Western films have been made, the most notable of which could be the 1971 low-budget comedy The Unhanged, directed by, written by, and starring Spede Pasanen.

Some new Euro-Westerns emerged in the 2010s, including Kristian Levring's The Salvation, Martin Koolhoven's Brimstone, and Andreas Prochaska's The Dark Valley.

=== Filipino Western ===
Also called the Adobo or Pancit Western, the genre, already familiar to Filipino audiences due to American rule of the Philippines, is transposed into a Filipino setting. It is distinct from other Asian Westerns by retaining more of the aesthetic of American Westerns but at the same time, having traditional Filipino themes, and many of the films also had socio-political context. The heroes were usually identified with the local people seeking redress from the landed elite or a supernatural force seeking their exploitation or destruction. Noted actors Fernando Poe Jr., Ramon Revilla Sr., and later Philippine president Joseph Estrada had played numerous roles in Westerns.

=== Greek Western ===
According to the naming conventions after spaghetti Western, in Greece they are also referred to as "fasolada Westerns" (Greek: φασολάδα = bean soup, i.e. one of the national dishes of Greece). Notable examples are Blood on the Land (1966), which was nominated for the Academy Award for Best Foreign Language Film, and Bullets don't come back (1967).

=== Ostern ===
Ostern or Eastern films were Western-style films produced in the Soviet Union and Socialist Eastern Europe. They were popular in Communist Eastern European countries and were a particular favorite of Joseph Stalin. Osterns are typically divided between "Easterns", which sought to portray an Eastern European analogue to the Wild West set in frontier regions across Eurasia, and "Red Westerns", which were set in the American West but sought to subvert the ideas of manifest destiny and other narratives typical of Hollywood Westerns in favor of Marxist ideals of proletarian internationalism and class consciousness.

Red Western films usually portrayed the American Indians sympathetically, as oppressed people fighting for their rights, in contrast to American Westerns of the time, which frequently portrayed them as villains. Osterns frequently featured Gypsy or Turkic people in the role of the Indians, due to the shortage of authentic Native Americans in Eastern Europe.

In "DEFA-Indianerfilme" series of films, produced in the GDR, Gojko Mitic portrayed righteous, kind-hearted, and charming Indian chiefs (e.g., in Die Söhne der großen Bärin (1966), directed by Josef Mach). He became honorary chief of the Sioux tribe when he visited the United States, in the 1990s, and the television crew accompanying him showed the tribe of one of his films. American actor and singer Dean Reed, an expatriate who lived in East Germany, also starred in several Ostern films.

"Eastern" films typically replaced the Wild West setting with by an Eastern setting in the steppes of the Caucasus. Western stock characters, such as "cowboys and Indians", were also replaced by Caucasian stock characters, such as bandits and harems. A famous example of the genre was White Sun of the Desert, which was popular in the Soviet Union.

=== Ramen Western ===
First used in the publicity of the film Tampopo, the term "ramen Western" also is a play on words using a national dish. The term is used to describe Western style media set in Asia. Examples include The Drifting Avenger, Break the Chain, Millionaires Express, East Meets West, Tears of the Black Tiger and Dynamite Warrior, Let the Bullets Fly, Unforgiven, Marlina the Murderer in Four Acts, Buffalo Boys, The Good, the Bad and the Weird, Golden Kamuy and Sukiyaki Western Django.

=== Roast Beef Western ===
A subgenre of Westerns made by british filmmakers and companies, coined by Sheldon Hall. Most tend to either take place in Australia, like Bitter Springs or Eureka Stockade, or Canada, like The Canadians (1961) or Ramsbottom Rides Again (1956), even being copoduced with those respective countries. Alternatively, they are parodies of amerian or italian-made westerns, like Carry On Cowboy (1966) in the Carry On franchise or A Fistful of Fingers (1995) by Edgar Wright. The very first western was Kidnapping by Indians (1899), made in Blackburn.

=== Spaghetti Western ===
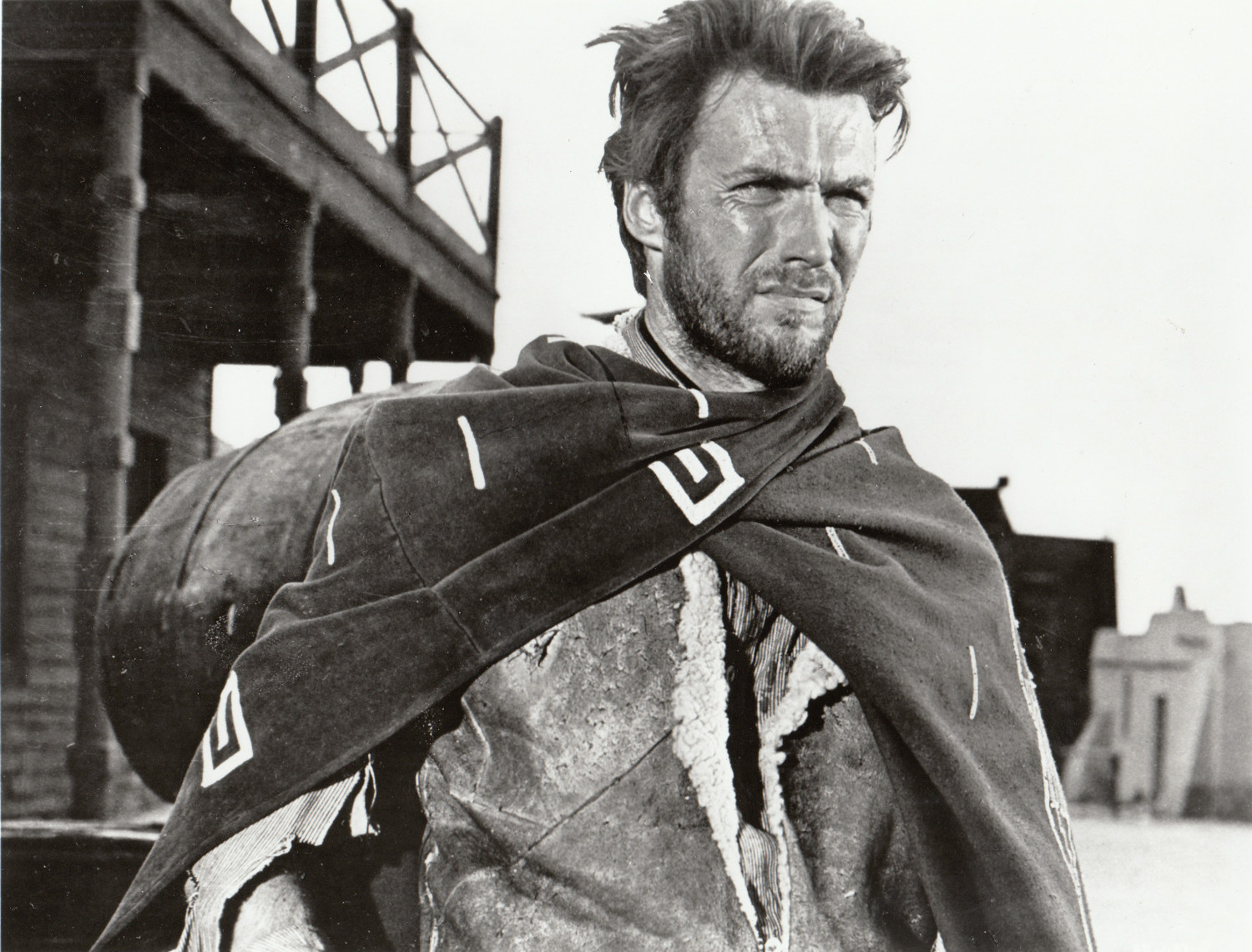
Clint Eastwood as the ambiguously named protagonist of the Dollars Trilogy (marketed as "the Man with No Name") in a publicity image of A Fistful of Dollars, a film by Sergio Leone

During the 1960s and 1970s, a revival of the Western emerged in Italy with the "spaghetti Westerns", also known as "Italo-Westerns". The most famous of them is The Good, the Bad and the Ugly, the third film of the Dollars Trilogy. Many of these films are low-budget affairs, shot in locations (for example, the Spanish desert region of Almería) chosen for their inexpensive crew and production costs, as well as their similarity to landscapes of the Southwestern United States. Spaghetti Westerns were characterized by the presence of more action and violence than the Hollywood Westerns. Also, the protagonists usually acted out of more selfish motives (money or revenge being the most common) than in the classical Westerns. Some spaghetti Westerns demythologized the American Western tradition, and some films from the genre are considered revisionist Westerns. For example, the Dollars Trilogy itself has much different tropes compared to standard Westerns, demythologizing the Sheriff figure (in A Fistful of Dollars and For a Few Dollars More), putting both the Union and the Confederacy in ambiguously moral positions (The Good, the Bad and the Ugly), and not featuring Native Americans (except for a brief mention in A Fistful of Dollars).

The Western films directed by Sergio Leone were felt by some to have a different tone from the Hollywood Westerns. Veteran American actors Charles Bronson, Lee Van Cleef, and Clint Eastwood became famous by starring in spaghetti Westerns, although the films also provided a showcase for other noted actors such as James Coburn, Henry Fonda, Rod Steiger, Klaus Kinski, Jason Robards, Gian Maria Volonte and Eli Wallach. Eastwood, previously the lead in the television series Rawhide, unexpectedly found himself catapulted into the forefront of the film industry by Leone's A Fistful of Dollars (the first in the Dollars Trilogy).

== Documentary Western ==
The documentary Western is a subgenre of Westerns that explore the nonfiction elements of the historical and contemporary American West. Between 1894 and 1899, Edison's early use of film included several examples of documentaries that introduced Western characters and settings. Among them were Parade of Buffalo Bill's Wild West Show. His work showcased Native American ceremonial dance films such as Eagle Dance and Indian Day School, working cowboys in Branding Cattle, and scenic attractions such as Royal Gorge and Coaches Going to Cinnabar from Yellowstone Park.

Ken Burns's The West is an example of a series based upon a historical storyline, whereas films such as Cowboys: A Documentary Portrait provide a nonfiction portrayal of modern working cowboys in the contemporary West.

== Electric Western ==
The 1971 film Zachariah starring John Rubinstein, Don Johnson, and Pat Quinn, was billed as the "first electric Western". The film featured multiple performing rock bands in an otherwise American West setting.

Zachariah featured appearances and music supplied by rock groups from the 1970s, including the James Gang and Country Joe and the Fish as "The Cracker Band". Fiddler Doug Kershaw had a musical cameo as does Elvin Jones as a gunslinging drummer named Job Cain.

The independent film Hate Horses starring Dominique Swain, Ron Thompson, and Paul Dooley billed itself as the "second electric Western".

== Epic Western ==
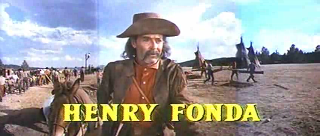
How the West Was Won (1962)

The epic Western is a subgenre of the Western that emphasizes the story of the American Old West on a grand scale. Many epic Westerns are set during a turbulent time, especially a war, as in Sergio Leone's The Good, the Bad and the Ugly (1966), set during the American Civil War, or Sam Peckinpah's The Wild Bunch (1969), set during the Mexican Revolution. One of the grandest films in this genre is Leone's Once Upon a Time in the West (1968), which shows many operatic conflicts centered on control of a town while using wide-scale shots of Monument Valley locations against a broad running-time.

In the silent film era, The Covered Wagon (1923) with J. Warren Kerrigan, was the first epic Western filmed entirely on location. Another silent epic was The Iron Horse (1924) with George O'Brien.

Other notable examples include Duel in the Sun (1946) with Joseph Cotten and Gregory Peck, The Searchers (1956) with John Wayne, Giant (1956) with Elizabeth Taylor and James Dean, The Big Country (1958) with Gregory Peck and Charlton Heston, Cimarron (1960) with Glenn Ford, How the West Was Won (1962) with James Stewart and Henry Fonda (among many others), Custer of the West (1967) with Robert Shaw, Duck, You Sucker! (1971) with Rod Steiger and James Coburn, Heaven's Gate (1980) with Isabelle Huppert, Thazhvaram (1990) with Mohanlal, Dances with Wolves (1990) with Kevin Costner, The Assassination of Jesse James by the Coward Robert Ford (2007) with Brad Pitt, Django Unchained (2012) with Jamie Foxx, The Revenant (2015) with Leonardo DiCaprio, and Horizon: An American Saga – Chapter 1 (2024).

== Exploitation Western ==
Exploitation Western is a subgenre of the Exploitation film, a genre characterized by "exploiting" lurid and graphic content throughout 1960s and 1970s up to the early 1980s. Examples of exploitation Western films include Soldier Blue (1970), Cain's Cutthroats (1971), Cut-Throats Nine (1972) and Kid Vengeance (1977).

== Fantasy Western ==
Fantasy Westerns mixed in fantasy settings and themes, and may include fantasy mythology as background. Some famous examples are Stephen King's The Stand and The Dark Tower series of novels, the Vertigo comics series Preacher, and Keiichi Sigsawa's light novel series, Kino's Journey, illustrated by Kouhaku Kuroboshi.

== Florida Western ==
Florida Westerns, also known as cracker Westerns, are set in Florida during the Second Seminole War. An example is Distant Drums (1951) starring Gary Cooper.

== Gaucho Western ==
Gaucho Westerns are films set in the 18th century in South America's pampas following stories of gauchos, cowhands and swashbucklers getting into adventures akin to the cowboys portrayed in American movies of the era. Notable examples of gaucho Westerns include Nobleza gaucha (1915), The Gaucho (1927), The Gaucho War (1942), Way of a Gaucho (1952), Savage Pampas (1966), Don Segundo Sombra (1969), The Ardor (2014) and The Settlers (2023). An example of a gaucho neo-Western would be The Ones From Below (2023).

== Horror Western ==
The horror Western subgenre has roots in films such as Curse of the Undead (1959), Jesse James Meets Frankenstein's Daughter (1965), and Billy the Kid vs. Dracula (1966), which depicts the legendary outlaw Billy the Kid fighting against the notorious vampire. Another example is The Ghoul Goes West, an unproduced Ed Wood film to star Bela Lugosi as Dracula in the Old West. Newer examples include the films Near Dark (1987) directed by Kathryn Bigelow, which tells the story about a human falling in love with a vampire, From Dusk till Dawn (1996) by Robert Rodriguez deals with outlaws battling vampires across the border, Vampires (1998) by John Carpenter, which tells about a group of vampires and vampire hunters looking for an ancient relic in the west, Ravenous (1999), which deals with cannibalism at a remote US army outpost; The Burrowers (2008), about a band of trackers who are stalked by the titular creatures; and Abraham Lincoln: Vampire Hunter (2012). Undead Nightmare (2010), an expansion to Red Dead Redemption (2010) is an example of a video game in this genre, telling the tale of a zombie outbreak in the Old West. Bone Tomahawk (2015) received wide critical acclaim for its chilling tale of cannibalism, but like many other movies in the genre, it was not a commercial success. Jordan Peele's film Nope (2022) combines horror and science fiction with a neo-Western lens. It depicts two rancher siblings attempting to capture evidence of a UFO terrorizing their remote desert ranch.

== Hybrid Western ==
A generic term for a Western which is combined with another genre such as horror, film noir or martial arts. Dynamite Warrior is a martial arts fantasy Western set in Thailand.

== Martial arts Western (Wuxia Western) ==
While many of these mash-ups (e.g., Billy Jack (1971) and its sequel The Trial of Billy Jack (1974)) are cheap exploitation films, others are more serious dramas such as the Kung Fu TV series, which ran from 1972 to 1975. Comedy examples include the Jackie Chan and Owen Wilson collaboration Shanghai Noon (2000). Further subdivisions of this subgenre include Westerns based on ninjas and samurais (incorporating samurai cinema themes), such as Red Sun (1971) with Charles Bronson, Alain Delon, and Toshiro Mifune.

== Musical ==
There have been many musical films with a Western setting and many musicians have appeared in Western films, sometimes in non-musical roles. Singers Doris Day and Howard Keel worked together in Calamity Jane, a huge success on release which remains one of the most popular Western musicals. On the other hand, crooner Dean Martin and pop singer Ricky Nelson played the parts of gunfighters in Rio Bravo, which is not a musical, although they did combine to sing a couple of songs in the middle of the film while they were guarding the jailhouse.

== Narco Western ==
A subgenre that highlights Mexican narcoculture and portrays drug trafficking and traffickers (real or imagined). Narco Westerns are typically set in Northern Mexico, the Southwest United States, or on the border between the two. A relatively new genre, Hilario Peña states the narco Western is the Western for the "modern age," and that "instead of a horse, the character drives a truck, and instead of fighting Apaches, the character must defeat criminals and the federal police in the state of Sinaloa." Examples of narco Westerns include the American television shows Breaking Bad and Better Call Saul, as well as the films Miss Bala, El Infierno and Heli. They may also come in the form of literature or telenovelas. Narco Westerns often feature narratives of personal identity, usually the struggles of a cowboy-like anti-hero, while focusing on themes of life and death, love and loss, greed and desire, and hope and pain. Dry or dark humor is sometimes used. Most notably, Narco Westerns frequently showcase graphic portrayals of addiction, violence, and narcoterrorism.

== Northern ==
The Northern genre is a subgenre of Westerns taking place in Alaska or Western Canada. Examples include several versions of the Rex Beach novel, The Spoilers (including 1930's The Spoilers, with Gary Cooper, and 1942's The Spoilers, with Marlene Dietrich, Randolph Scott, and Wayne); The Far Country (1954) with James Stewart; North to Alaska (1960) with Wayne; Death Hunt (1981) with Charles Bronson; and The Grey Fox (1983) with Richard Farnsworth.

== Pornographic Western ==
Pornographic Westerns use the Old West as a background for stories primarily focused on erotica. The three major examples of the porn Western film are Russ Meyer's nudie-cutie Wild Gals of the Naked West (1962), and the hardcore A Dirty Western (1975) and Sweet Savage (1979). Sweet Savage starred Aldo Ray, a veteran actor who had appeared in traditional Westerns, in a non-sex role. Among videogames, Custer's Revenge (1982) is an infamous example, considered to be one of the worst video games of all time.

== Pre-Western ==
Film critic Philip French includes a subgenre of "pre-Western" to describe films that include themes and characters reminiscent of cowboy pictures but are not strictly regarded as Westerns. This includes films with an early nineteenth century frontier setting with characters like James Fenimore Cooper's Natty Bumppo. It includes examples like The Alamo (1960) and Drums Along the Mohawk (1939).

== Revisionist Western ==
In the 1960s and 1970s, the Western was reinvented with the revisionist Western. After the early 1960s, many American filmmakers began to deconstruct many traditional elements of Westerns, and to make revisionist Westerns in order to subvert the traditional hero-versus-villain dualism and the morality of using violence to test one's character or to prove oneself right. This is shown in Sam Peckinpah's The Wild Bunch (1969). One major revision was the increasingly positive representation of Native Americans, who had been treated as "savages" in earlier films. Examples of such revisionist Westerns include Ride the High Country (1962), Richard Harris' A Man Called Horse (1970), Little Big Man (1970), Soldier Blue (1970), Man in the Wilderness (1971), The Outlaw Josey Wales (1976), Dances with Wolves (1990), Unforgiven (1992), The Quick and the Dead (1995), and Dead Man (1995). A television miniseries, Godless (2016), also fits into this category. A few earlier revisionist Westerns gave women more powerful roles, such as Westward the Women (1951) starring Robert Taylor. Another earlier work encompassed all these features, The Last Wagon (1956). In it, Richard Widmark played a white man raised by Comanches and persecuted by Whites, with Felicia Farr and Susan Kohner playing young women forced into leadership roles.

== Science fiction Western ==
The science fiction Western places science fiction elements within a traditional Western setting. Early examples are serial films such The Phantom Empire (1935) and Ghost Patrol (1936) which incorporated supernatural figures of science fiction fantasy into a Western setting. An example of cross-over genre, the fantasy science fiction Western The Valley of Gwangi (1969) displayed cowboys fighting dinosaurs, a trend that took hold during the 1960s. John Jakes's Six Gun Planet takes place on a future planet colonized by people consciously seeking to recreate the Old West (with cowboys riding robot horses...). The movie Westworld (1973) and its sequel Futureworld (1976), Back to the Future Part III (1990), Wild Wild West (1999), and Cowboys & Aliens (2011), and the television series Westworld (2016, based on the movie).

This subgenre also encompasses the post-apocalyptic Western, an offshoot of the Western genre with themes of lawlessness and survival, and often include an alienated lone hero trying to make sense out of the chaos. Examples include The Postman, the Mad Max series, and The Rover. Science fiction Westerns may also incorporate steampunk elements, giving rise to the steampunk Western.

== Singing cowboy Western ==
A singing cowboy was a subtype of the archetypal cowboy hero of early Western films. It references real-world campfire side ballads in the American frontier, the original cowboys sang of life on the trail with all the challenges, hardships, and dangers encountered while pushing cattle for miles up the trails and across the prairies.

== Space Western ==
The space Western is a subgenre of science fiction which uses the themes and tropes of Westerns within science-fiction stories. Subtle influences may include exploration of lawless frontiers in deep space, while more overt influences may feature literal cowboys in outer space who use ray guns and ride robotic horses. Examples include the American cartoon series BraveStarr (which aired original episodes from September 1987 to February 1988), the Japanese manga series Trigun (debuted in 1995), the Japanese anime series Cowboy Bebop (debuted in 1997), the American television series Firefly (created by Joss Whedon in 2002), and the films Battle Beyond the Stars (1980), which is a remake of The Magnificent Seven; Outland (1981), which is a remake of High Noon; and Serenity (2005, based on the Firefly TV series). The classic Western genre has also been a major influence on science-fiction films such as the original Star Wars movie of 1977, with 2018's Solo: A Star Wars Story and 2019's The Mandalorian more directly featuring Western tropes. Gene Roddenberry's concept of the TV show Star Trek was a "Wagon Train to the stars".

== Weird Western ==
The weird Western combines elements of the classic Western with those of other genres, particularly fantasy, horror and science fiction. This subgenre includes the steampunk Western subvariant, which incorporates the retrofuturistic elements of steampunk. The Wild Wild West television series, television movies, and 1999 film adaptation blend the Western with steampunk. The Jonah Hex franchise also blends the Western with superhero elements. The film Western Religion (2015), by writer and director James O'Brien, introduces the devil into a traditional Wild West setting. The Old Man Logan (2008–2009) graphic novel combines the elements of superhero and post apocalyptic fiction with Westerns.
