= Fibular hemimelia =

Congenital absence of the fibula

- Other names: Longitudinal fibular deficiency
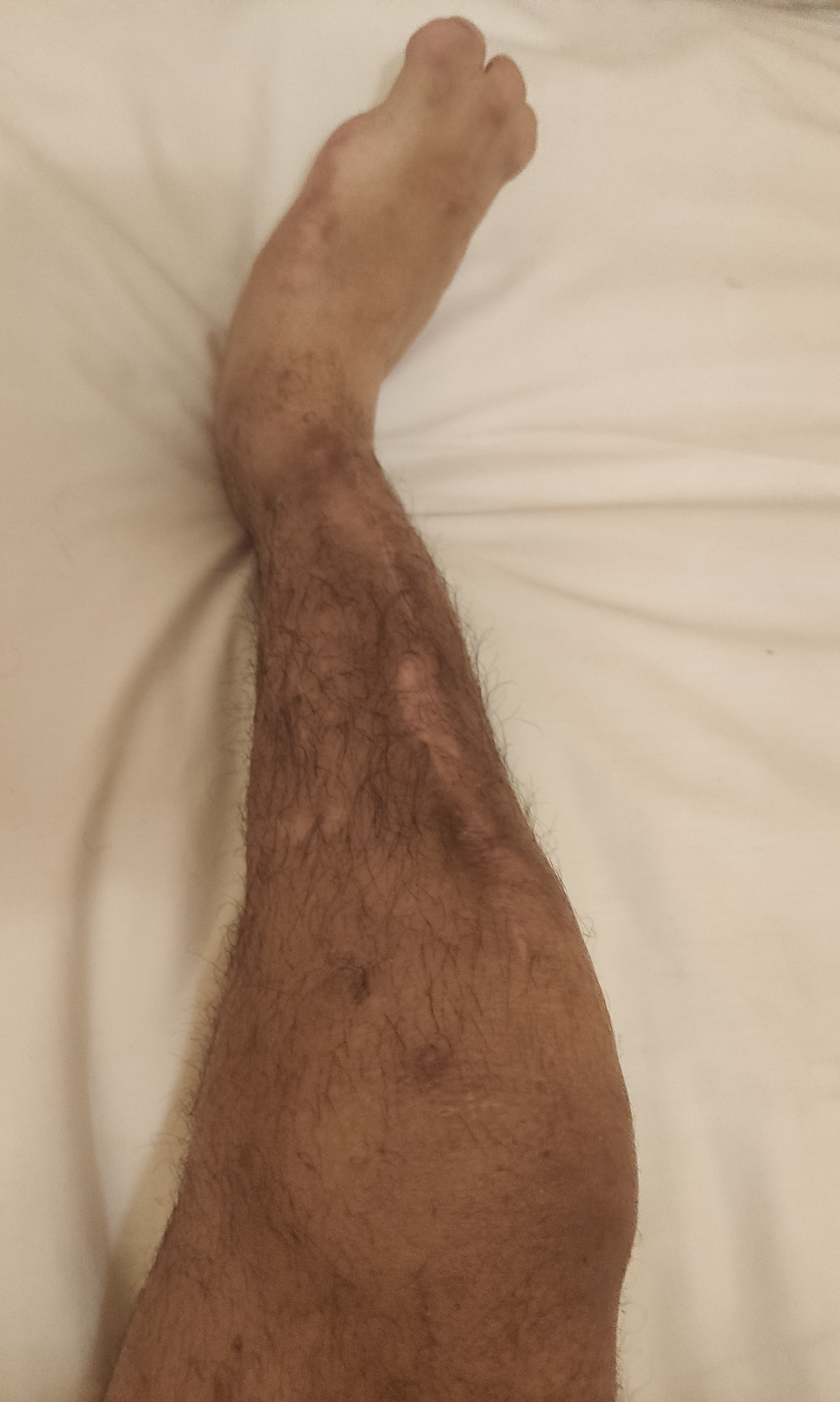
- Fibula hemimelia in patient affecting right side
- Specialty: Medical genetics, orthopedics
- Frequency: 0.005%

Fibular hemimelia or longitudinal fibular deficiency is "the congenital absence of the fibula and it is the most common congenital absence of long bone of the extremities." It is the shortening of the fibula at birth, or the complete lack thereof. Fibular hemimelia often causes severe knee instability due to deficiencies of the ligaments. Severe forms of fibula hemimelia can result in a malformed ankle with limited motion and stability. Fusion or absence of two or more toes are also common. In humans, the disorder can be noted by ultrasound in utero to prepare for amputation after birth or complex bone-lengthening surgery. The amputation usually occurs at six months with removal of portions of the legs to prepare them for prosthetic use. The other treatments, which include repeated corrective osteotomies and leg-lengthening surgery (Ilizarov apparatus), are costly and associated with residual deformity.

== Characteristics ==
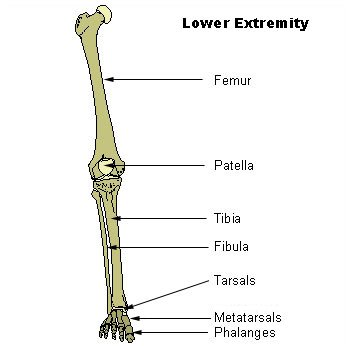
Bones of human lower extremity

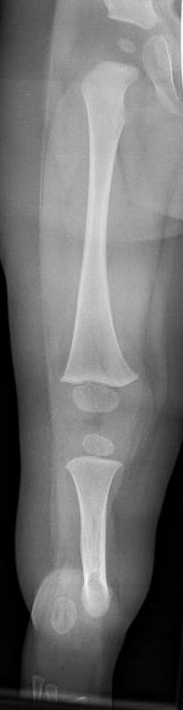
X-ray image of fibular hemimelia type II (fibula completely absent)

Characteristics are:

- A fibrous band instead of the fibula
- Short deformed leg
- Absence of the lateral part of the ankle joint (due to absence of the distal end of the fibula), and what is left is unstable; the foot has an equinovalgus deformity
- Possible absence of part of the foot requiring surgical intervention to bring the foot into normal function, or amputation.
- Possible absence of one or two toes on the foot
- Possible conjoined toes or metatarsals

Partial or total absence of fibula is among the most frequent limb anomalies. It is the most common long bone deficiency and is the most common skeletal deformity in the leg. It most often is unilateral (present only on one side). It may also present as bilateral (affecting both legs). Paraxial fibular hemimelia is the most common manifestation in which only the postaxial portion of the limb is affected. It is commonly seen as a complete terminal deficiency, where the lateral rays of the foot are also affected. Hemimelia can also be intercalary in which case the foot remains unaffected. Although the missing bone is easily identified, this condition is not simply a missing bone. Males are affected twice as often as females in most series.

== Causes ==
The cause of fibular hemimelia is unclear. Purportedly, there have been some incidents of genetic distribution in a family; however, this does not account for all cases. Possible causes include maternal viral infections, embryonic trauma, teratogenic environmental exposures or vascular dysgenesis (failure of the embryo to form a satisfactory blood supply) between four and seven weeks gestation.

In an experimental mouse model, change in the expression of a homeobox gene led to similar, but bilateral, fibular defects.

== Notable people ==
- Aled Davies – Welsh Paralympic athlete
- Jessica Long – American Paralympic swimmer
- Liam Malone – New Zealand Paralympic athlete
- Barry McClements – Northern Irish Paralympic and Commonwealth Games swimmer
- Aimee Mullins – American Paralympic athlete, actress, and fashion model
- Oscar Pistorius – Former South African athlete and convicted murderer
- Long Jeanne Silver – American former pornographic actress
- Hunter Woodhall – American Paralympic athlete
- Beatriz Hatz – American Paralympic athlete, Reality Show Contestant

== See also ==
- Congenital abnormality
- List of congenital disorders
- List of ICD-9 codes 740-759: Congenital anomalies
- Mitochondrial disease
