= Red River Valley (song) =

Cowboy folk standard

"Red River Valley" is a folk song and cowboy music standard of uncertain origins that has gone by different names (such as "Cowboy Love Song", "Bright Sherman Valley", "Bright Laurel Valley", "In the Bright Mohawk Valley", and "Bright Little Valley"), depending on where it has been sung. It is listed as Roud Folk Song Index 756 and by Edith Fowke as FO 13. It is recognizable by its chorus (with several variations):

From this valley they say you are going,
We will miss your bright eyes and sweet smile.
For they say you are taking the sunshine
That has brightened our pathway a while.

So come sit by my side if you love me.
Do not hasten to bid me adieu.
Just remember the Red River Valley
And the cowboy that has loved you so true.

Members of the Western Writers of America chose it as one of the Top 100 Western songs of all time, ranked #10.

== Lyrics and chords ==
Wikiversity offers more help singing this song

== Origins ==
The song's first appearance in any printed source appears to have been in Milwaukee newspaper The Weekly Wisconsin in 1887. On June 25 a list appeared of song titles whose lyrics readers had requested, including Red River Valley, and a version of the lyrics appeared in the September 17 issue, supplied by a resident of the western Wisconsin town of Mondovi. According to Canadian folklorist Edith Fowke, there is anecdotal evidence that the song was known in at least five Canadian provinces before 1896. This finding led to speculation that the song was composed at the time of the 1870 Wolseley Expedition to Manitoba's northern Red River Valley. It expresses the sorrow of a local woman (possibly a Métis) as her soldier lover prepares to return to the east. Fowke's anecdotal evidence for a date before the 1880s, however, is sparse and dubious, and any connection with the Wolseley Expedition almost completely unsupported by evidence. The Red River Valley extends into the United States, where it forms the border between Minnesota and North Dakota. The question of the song's exact geographic origin therefore remains unresolved, though the great weight of the evidence does establish that it refers to this Red River and not to any southern or western American river by that name.

"Red River Valley"

Single by Hugh Cross and Riley Puckett
- B-side: "When You Wore a Tulip"
- Written: c. 1880s
- Released: January 1928
- Recorded: November 3, 1927
- Studio: Atlanta, Georgia
- Genre: Canadian folk music, Country, Western
- Length: 2:54
- Label: Columbia 15206
- Songwriter: Traditional

The earliest known written manuscript of the lyrics, titled "The Red River Valley", bears the notations "Nemaha 1879" and "Harlan 1885." Nemaha and Harlan are the names of counties in Nebraska, and are also the names of towns in Iowa.

The song appears in sheet music, titled "In the Bright Mohawk Valley", printed in New York in 1896 with James J. Kerrigan as the writer. The tune and lyrics were collected and published in Carl Sandburg's 1927 American Songbag.

An important recording in this song's history was the 1927 Columbia Records master (15206-D) performed by Hugh Cross and Riley Puckett under the actual title of "Red River Valley". This version was the very first commercially available recording of this song under its most familiar title, and it was the inspiration for many of the recordings that followed.

== Film appearances ==
- 1936, Gene Autry sang the song in the Republic film Red River Valley, and with the Cass County Boys, sang the song in the 1946 film Sioux City Sue.
- 1939, The Three Stooges sing the song in the short film Yes, We Have No Bonanza.
- 1940, It was particularly memorable in John Ford's The Grapes of Wrath, whose tale of displaced Oklahomans associated it with the southern Red River.
- 1943, An instrumental version appeared in the film The Ox-Bow Incident.
- 1953, It was sung first by people in a pub with slightly different lyrics and more briefly at other points in a film about British paratroopers during World War II titled The Red Beret.
- 1962, An instrumental version played on a harp by Harpo Marx in Episode 1-4 "The Musicale" of Mr. Smith Goes to Washington, a sitcom starring Fess Parker. This was Harpo Marx's last television appearance.
- 1971, Another film in which it had important but subtle usage in was The Last Picture Show a film about the internal decay of small town Texas in the early 1950s.
- 1973, The song was used instrumentally in Dillinger as a recurring theme for John Dillinger's longing for his boyhood home and his family.
- 1979, Carol Connors sang it in the X-rated movie Sweet Savage.
- 1981, Lorraine De Selle and Zora Ulla Keslerová sing the song in Cannibal Ferox.
- 1987, A re-recorded electronic rendition of "Red River Rock" was recorded by Silicon Teens and featured in the movie Planes, Trains and Automobiles An earlier version had appearead on their 1980 album Music For Parties.
- 1989, The song was sung in an adult contemporary style on the Shining Time Station episode "Mapping It Out". It also appeared on video Jukebox Band Lullaby.
- 1990, It was played in the film score when the gang member played by David Morse meets his demise in the movie Desperate Hours.
- 1993, Dana Delany sang it in the film Tombstone.
- 2006, It was sung by Garrison Keillor and cast in the film A Prairie Home Companion.
- 2014, A part of the song was sung in the film Wild by child actor Evan O'Toole during a scene with Reese Witherspoon.
- 2017, Harry Dean Stanton sang it in part 10 of Twin Peaks.
- 2017, A harmonica version of it played repeatedly in the film Lucky.

== TV appearances ==
1962–63, sung by Ken Curtis on his TV series Ripcord, with Harry Carey Jr. playing guitar. It was one of two guest appearances Carey made on the show (one in 1962, and the other in 1963).

== Other cultural references ==
- The song is played by Randall in Recess in the episode "One Stayed Clean" while he is sitting with TJ, Gus and the diggers in their hole. In the episode, the gang helps Gus (who has never had a picture day because of his constantly changing schools) stay clean so he can have a great school photo.
- "Red River Valley" was the theme song of Our Gal Sunday, a soap opera broadcast on CBS radio from 1937 to 1959.
- "Jarama Valley", a song about the Battle of Jarama of the Spanish Civil War, used the tune to "Red River Valley". It was recorded by Woody Guthrie and The Almanac Singers, featuring Pete Seeger.
- The tune to "Red River Valley", set to new lyrics and titled "Can I Sleep in Your Arms", was used on Willie Nelson's 1975 album Red Headed Stranger. This version was based on the song "Can I Sleep in your Barn Tonight Mister."
- Johnny Cash wrote and performed a humorous song titled "Please Don't Play Red River Valley" for his 1966 album Everybody Loves a Nut
- Bob Dylan wrote and recorded "Red River Shore" — which uses motifs and plays with themes from "Red River Valley" — for Time Out of Mind (1997). Left off the album, two versions of it were included in The Bootleg Series Vol. 8: Tell Tale Signs: Rare and Unreleased 1989–2006 in 2008.
- The Kidsongs Kids parodied this song on their 1995 Let's Put on a Show video as "We'll Put on a Show".
- The Swedish song "I'm a Lapp", recorded in 1959 by Sven-Gösta Jonsson, is based on the melody of "Red River Valley."
- Johnny and the Hurricanes recorded a rock and roll instrumental version in 1959 of the song titled "Red River Rock", which became a hit in the U.S. (#5), the UK (#3), and Canada (#3).
- The tune of "Red River Valley" was used for the verses of the 1963 Connie Francis hit "Drownin' My Sorrows" (#36 in the US and #40 in Canada.)
- "Drownin' My Sorrows" was covered in German as "Ich tausche mit keinem auf der Welt" in 1964 by Margot Eskens and in Croatian as "Uz Tebe Sam Sretna" in 1968 by Ana Štefok.
- The premier Czech vocalist Helena Vondráčková made her recording debut in September 1964 with "Červená řeka", a rendering of "Red River Valley".
- A fatalistic chorus can be found in some sources related to F-105 pilots in Vietnam:

Come and sit by my side at the briefing,
We will sit there and tickle the beads,
Then we'll head for the Red River Valley,
And today I'll be flying Teak lead,

To the valley he said we are flying,
With a Thud of the plane to the earth,
Many jockeys have flown to the valley,
And a number have never returned

- In its soundtrack, the 2010 video game Fallout: New Vegas adapted the lyrics and tune of "Red River Valley" as "New Vegas Valley".
- The first four verses of the chant "Scouser Tommy", sung by supporters of Liverpool F.C., is to the tune of "Red River Valley".
- "Red River Valley" is the official Slow March of the Fort Garry Horse, a reserve Line Cavalry Regiment of the Canadian Army.
- The 19th-century Manitoba song "Red River Valley" is played weekly on TV in the Philippines on a GMA TV comedy show titled Bubble Gang, with varied Tagalog humorous lyrics sung to the accompaniment of ukuleles, recurring from circa 2011 to present day by various performers.
- David McEnery (1914–2002), singer-songwriter, otherwise known as Red River Dave, takes this name from the song.
- The Ant and the Grasshopper story is sung to the tune of "Red River Valley" in a Cocomelon video (2018).

== Sources ==
- Edith Fowke and Keith MacMillan. (1973). The Penguin Book of Canadian Folk Songs. Harmondsworth, Middlesex: Penguin.
- Allen, Jules Verne. "Singing Along" (reprinted from New Mexico Magazine, 1935). Roundup of Western Literature: An Anthology for Young Readers pp. 82–85, edited by Oren Arnold.
- Kerrigan, James J. "In The Bright Mohawk Valley". New York: Howley, Haviland & Co. (1896).
- Fowke, Edith "The Red River Valley Re-examined." Western Folklore 23 (July 1964) 1630–71.
- Fuld, James J. The Book of World-Famous Music: Classical, Popular, and Folk. Dover Publications (2000).
- Waltz, Robert B; David G. Engle. "The Red River Valley". The Traditional Ballad Index: An Annotated Bibliography of the Folk Songs of the English-Speaking World. Hosted by California State University, Fresno, Folklore, 2007.
