= The Wolverine (soundtrack) =

The Wolverine: Original Motion Picture Soundtrack

Film score by Marco Beltrami
- Released: July 23, 2013
- Recorded: 2012–2013
- Studios: Newman Scoring Stage, 20th Century Fox Studios, Los Angeles
- Genre: Film score
- Length: 58:30
- Label: Sony Classical
- Producers: Marco Beltrami; Brandon Roberts; Buck Sanders; Marcus Trumpp; James Mangold (exec.)

Marco Beltrami chronology
World War Z (2013)	The Wolverine (2013)	Snowpiercer (2013)

The Wolverine (Original Motion Picture Soundtrack) is the soundtrack album to the 2013 superhero film of the same name, directed by James Mangold. Featuring the Marvel Comics character Wolverine, the film is the sixth installment in the X-Men film series, the second installment in the trilogy of Wolverine films after X-Men Origins: Wolverine (2009), and a spin-off/sequel to X-Men: The Last Stand (2006). The film's musical score is composed by Marco Beltrami, who previously scored Mangold's 3:10 to Yuma (2007).

The score was performed by an 85-piece ensemble of the Hollywood Studio Symphony at the Newman Scoring Stage located in 20th Century Fox Studios. It consisted of mostly Japanese instruments, which were used in a Spaghetti Western music rather than traditional Japanese score, leading Beltrami to experiment with the instruments. The album was released by Sony Classical Records on July 23, 2013 and received positive reviews from critics.

== Development ==
"...it was a very un-traditional superhero movie in a respect. It had film noir aspects to it, a mystery going on, and Logan's character is sort of a dark isolationist character. That ultimately led to my choice for the harmonica being his instrument. It has a very lonely sound to it. I was a little worried at first, but what I was doing fit the picture or at least what I was experimenting with. The fact that it was a superhero movie and I had harmonica for his character, I was wondering how well that would fly. Jim was very supportive of it. I think the way it develops in the film…hopefully it works."

— Marco Beltrami, on the film's musical approach

In September 2012, Marco Beltrami, announced that he had signed on to score for The Wolverine. Beltrami added that "the character Wolverine is a bit of a loner. There is a sound and melodic structure and harmonic structure that is used for him, but it's not like a Superman type of theme; it's much more reserved." Following Mangold's noir and Spaghetti Western inspirations for the film, Beltrami explained, "I think I do every movie as a western whether it is or not, so there's definitely some of the spaghetti western influence on my music throughout the score, and I guess throughout a lot of my work. I wouldn't say there was a particular movie that influenced me more than something else. There was nothing that I was trying to mimic or anything."

Despite the film's setting in Japan, Beltrami decided not to use an "authentic Japanese score", but had used Japanese instruments for licensing and not to score in a traditional way. Wolverine's theme basically consisted of harmonica, as the primary sound for the character, was the "most non-orchestral musical element of the score". The koto (a Japanese string instrument) was used as a percussive instrument, instead of strings, to follow the non-traditional approach. He further used Japanese percussions, taiko drums and flutes in the score. On using the Japanese flutes, Beltrami approached a "western-like treatment" which was not really "based on any pentatonic scales". He added "There's echo tunnel drumming that takes place in there, but often times it's processed, and different effects are put on it; so it's nothing really traditionally Japanese as part of the score."

== Critical reception ==
Professional ratings
Review scores
Source	Rating
AllMusic	4/5 stars
AVForums	(highly recommended)
Filmtracks	2/5 stars
SoundtrackGeek	(82.7/100)

James Manheim of Allmusic wrote "Beltrami draws on the latter vocabulary in this moody score, which favors dark psychological tension over kinetic action scenes and often pushes the dissonance content of cinematic orchestral music close to its limits. Beltrami cleverly runs counter to expectations in another way as well, acknowledging the film's samurai themes with some Japanese flute passages and taiko drum sounds, but keeping them largely in the background. The music is mostly devoted to the states of mind of the mutant Wolverine. With the filmmakers backing an ambitious score for large orchestra by a composer who appears to be hitting his creative peak, this is a worthwhile pick for film music fans in general, as well as those brought to it by the brooding Wolverine himself." Chris McNeany of AV Forums called it as "a fine amalgamation of moody ethnic-laced suspense, pulse-pounding excitement and an ambient sense of melancholic romance and mystery that is suitably strung with quivering apprehension". Filmtracks.com gave a mixed review saying "Beltrami fails to really adopt any kind of superior narrative approach, forcing ambient brutality upon us rather than continued growth for the character. Be prepared for a depressingly futile battle of cultural stereotypes if you choose to explore Beltrami's take." Mfiles wrote " The Wolverine is nevertheless a contemporary superhero score done with considerably more flair and thought than most."

Soundtrack Geek gave a positive review, stating "The Wolverine is a fantastic score in parts, but because of the slow beginning, the score is not excellent as a whole. It's pretty damn good though and Beltrami's best of the year so far." James Southall of Movie Wave wrote "Beltrami establishes an incredibly dark tone – huge parts of the score consist of oppressive percussion (including mighty Japanese drums, reflective of the film's setting) with brass stings and murky string runs around them. Some of it's actually quite sophisticated, particularly the more elaborate percussion; it's just not the sort of thing I would ever actually want to listen to. A couple of the action cues are more vintage Beltrami and these are fantastic but far too much of the album consists of monotone brooding drone for it to work for me as a piece of entertainment." Peter Debruge of Variety called it as "sensational cross-cultural score", while Screen Rant-based critic Sandy Schaefer wrote that parts of the music recall Ennio Morricone's music for The Good, the Bad and the Ugly (1966), "which helps to hammer that idea home and strengthen the film's East-meets-West subtext in the process."

== Track listing ==
All music is composed by Marco Beltrami.

No.	Title	Length
1.	"A Walk in the Woods"	1:02
2.	"Threnody for Nagasaki"	1:15
3.	"Euthanasia"	1:36
4.	"Logan's Run"	3:56
5.	"The Offer Time"	3:15
6.	"Arriving at the Temple"	2:10
7.	"Funeral Fight"	4:22
8.	"Two Handed"	4:04
9.	"Bullet Train"	1:31
10.	"The Snare"	1:32
11.	"Abduction"	2:11
12.	"Trusting"	1:54
13.	"Ninja Quiet"	3:40
14.	"Kantana Surgery"	3:50
15.	"The Wolverine"	2:21
16.	"The Hidden Fortress"	5:02
17.	"Silver Samurai"	3:27
18.	"Sword of Vengeance"	4:32
19.	"Dreams"	1:21
20.	"Goodbye Mariko"	1:01
21.	"Where To?"	2:25
22.	"Whole Step Haiku"	2:08
23.	"Yukio"	1:49

== Charts ==
Chart (2013)	Peak position
UK Soundtrack Albums (OCC)	23

== Personnel ==
Credits adapted from CD liner notes

- Composer – Marco Beltrami
- Additional music – Brandon Roberts, Buck Sanders, Marcus Trumpp
- Executive producer – James Mangold
- Recording – Tim Lauber
- Mixing – John Kurlander, Tyson Lozensky
- Mastering – Erick Labson
- Editing – Jim Schultz, Ted Caplan
- Music supervision – Rebecca Morellato, Amy Dunning
- Copyist – Joann Kane Music Service, Mark Graham

Instrumentation

- Bass – Bart Samolis, Bruce Morgenthaler, Christian Kollgaard, Drew Dembowski, Edward Meares, Geoffrey Osika, Michael Valerio, Nico Abondolo, Stephen Dress
- Bassoon – Kenneth Munday, Rose Corrigan, Samantha Duckworth
- Cello – Andrew Shulman, Armen Ksajikian, Cecilia Tsan, Christina Soule, Dennis Karmazyn, Erika Duke-Kirkpatrick, Evgeny Tonkha, George Kim Scholes, Patricia Garvey, Paula Hochhalter, Steve Erdody, Timothy Landauer, Timothy Loo
- Clarinet – Gary Bovyer, Ralph Williams
- Flute – Geraldine Rotella, Sara Andon
- Harmonica – Tommy Morgan
- Harp – Maria Dickstein
- Horn – Andrew Bain, Daniel Kelley, David Everson, Dylan Hart, Jim Thatcher, Jenny Kim, Laura Brenes, Mark Adams, Steven Becknell
- Keyboards – Bryan Pezzone
- Koto – Giampiero Ambrosi, June Kuramoto
- Percussion – Alan Estes, Donald Williams, Gregory Goodall, M.B. Gordy III, Steven Schaeffer, Wade Culbreath
- Trombone – Alan Kaplan, Bill Reichenbach, Craig Gosnell, Steven Holtman, William Booth
- Trumpet – Barry Perkins, David Washburn, Jon Lewis, Rick Baptist, Robert Schaer
- Tuba – Doug Tornquist, Doug Webb
- Viola – Andrew Duckles, Brian Dembow, Darrin McCann, David Walther, Erik Rynearson, Jennie Hansen, Maria Newman, Matthew Funes, Pamela Jacobson, Robert Brophy, Roland Kato, Scott Hosfeld, Shawn Mann, Victoria Miskolczy
- Violin – Aimee Kreston, Amy Hershberger, Belinda Broughton, Bruce Dukov, Caroline Campbell, Charlie Bisharat, Darius Campo, Dimitrie Leivici, Elizabeth Hedman, Endre Granat, Helen Nightengale, Irina Voloshina, Jay Rosen, Jeanne Skrocki, Jessica Guideri, Josefina Vergara, Julie Gigante, Katia Popov, Kevin Connolly, Lili Haydn, Lisa Liu, Lisa Sutton, Lorand Lokuszta, Marc Sazer, Mark Robertson, Natalie Leggett, Phillip Levy, Radu Pieptea, Rafael Rishik, Roberto Cani, Roger Wilkie, Sara Parkins, Sarah Thornblade, Serena McKinney, Shalini Vijayan, Steven Zander, Tamara Hatwan, Tereza Stanislav
- Woodwind – Chris Bleth

Orchestra

- Orchestrator – Dana Niu, Jon Kull, Mark Graham, Patrick Russ, Pete Anthony, Rossano Galante
- Conductor – Marco Beltrami, Pete Anthony
- Contractor – Peter Rotter
- Concertmistress – Belinda Broughton
- Stage engineer – Marc Gebauer
- Stage manager – Christine Sirois, Tom Steel
