= Carol Connors (actress) =

American pornographic actress

- Born: New Jersey, U.S.
- Occupation: Actress
- Spouse: Jack Birch
- Children: Thora Birch

Carol Connors is an American pornographic film actress. She starred in about 20 adult movies between 1971 and 1981. Married to fellow former porn star Jack Birch, she is the mother of actress Thora Birch.

== Early life ==
Connors was born in New Jersey on November 13, 1952, and grew up in New Jersey and Texas.

== Career ==
Connors began her adult entertainment career in the early 1970s, achieving fame in Deep Throat (1972) and The Erotic Adventures of Candy (1978).

Connors went on to appear on NBC's amateur-talent contest The Gong Show. Her debut on the program, in 1977, between porn assignments, was as a song-and-dance contestant. Said Connors, "I was awarded nine points by the two men judges and two points by Jaye P. Morgan, one for each ... bosom." She eventually became one of the hit show's compères who would introduce host Chuck Barris.

Her Gong Show appearances were parodied in Gail Palmer's 1979 porn film Candy Goes To Hollywood, in which she starred alongside Wendy O. Williams, John Leslie, and Richard Pacheco.

When actor Aldo Ray decided to work in the 1979 pornographic western Sweet Savage in a non-sexual part, Connors was one of the movie's protagonists. The movie was shot at Apacheland, a movie ranch in Apache Junction, Arizona.

In 1981, Connors directed and starred, along with Long Jeanne Silver, in Desire for Men.
