= A Dirty Western =

- Film Poster
- Directed by: Joseph F. Robertson
- Written by: Joseph F. Robertson
- Produced by: Michael Darrin
- Starring: Barbara Bourbon; Richard O'Neal; Geoffrey Parker; Dick Payne; Levi Richards
- Cinematography: Robert Rubin
- Edited by: Jay Reilly
- Music by: Steve Jason; Lee J. O'Donnell
- Production company: Realité
- Distributed by: Cricket Productions; VCX
- Release date: April 1975; (USA)
- Running time: 71 min.
- Country: United States
- Language: English

A Dirty Western is a 1975 pornographic Western film directed by Joseph F. Robertson and starring Barbara Bourbon. Along with Russ Meyer's nudie-cutie Wild Gals of the Naked West (1962) and the hardcore Sweet Savage (1979), the film is one of the few porn films in the Western genre.

== Cast ==
- Barbara Bourbon as Sarah
- Richard O'Neal as Nate
- Geoffrey Parker as Sheriff Josh
- Dick Payne as Luke
- Levi Richards as Barney

== See also ==
- List of American films of 1975
