= World War Z (soundtrack) =

World War Z: Music from the Motion Picture

Soundtrack album by Marco Beltrami
- Released: June 18, 2013
- Recorded: 2012–2013
- Studios: Abbey Road Studios; British Grove Studios
- Genre: Film score
- Length: 44:09
- Label: Warner Bros.

Marco Beltrami chronology
A Good Day to Die Hard (2013)	World War Z (2013)	The Wolverine (2013)

World War Z: Music from the Motion Picture is the score album to the 2013 film of the same name directed by Marc Forster. Featuring an original score composed by Marco Beltrami, the album has 11 tracks and was released by Warner Bros. Records on June 18, 2013.

== Development ==
In December 2011, Marco Beltrami was hired to write the score for World War Z. Beltrami read the first script for the film and was blown away with the footages he saw, as it was "a unique take on the whole zombie thing. The whole notion of them being like a force of nature, and how they swarm and all that, and I thought it would have neat music applications and I just thought it would be a blast to work on." When he first saw the film, post the Philadelphia sequence, the screen cuts to black, and the Emergency Alert System's (EAS) iconic siren tone is being heard, which he felt as a fundamental harmonic structure for the score. He further used sounds from the peccary, a feral pig native to southwestern North America, to underscore the film's focus on zombie's teeth as a motif through the film, which was suggested by Tommy Lee Jones. He brought several peccary skulls and recorded and played them in collaboration with professional percussionists, where the sounds have been covered up by orchestral percussion but stands up to create tension for the film.

Beltrami discussed with editor Matt Cheese about ideas on putting cues throughout the edit, and had closely worked with Paramount Music's executive producer Randy Spendlove where music editor John Finklea helped in cutting the cues and musical pieces to fix the atmosphere of the film. He felt that "one of the things, score-wise, that I thought was important was being able to have a lot of quick, off-beat, odd-metered rhythms, because that type of stuff seems to provide a real unsettling feeling in the audience when they are watching it because it's something you have a hard time grasping on to."

The score was recorded at the Abbey Road Studios in London. It features a large ensemble orchestra recording most of the pieces, along with a smaller group at British Grove Studios, where he would record some of the "chamber, intimate, gritty, rosin-on-the-bow type of stuff". Since the film has faced several setbacks during the production with rewrites and reshoots being happened, the subsequent delays led Beltrami stepping away from the project for about a year, where he could complete scoring for The Wolverine (2013). He then wanted to significantly scrap the "harsh, dissonant and extremely aggressive" score, which Beltrami thought, as the studio executives felt that the score might push the film towards an R rating instead of the intended PG-13.

== Reception ==
Professional ratings
Review scores
Source	Rating
Movie Wave	3.5/5 stars
Filmtracks	3/5 stars

Jonathan Broxton wrote "World War Z is full of innovation and creative thinking on Beltrami's part, and in listening to the score you can't help but be impressed at the way in which the score is structured, layered and presented to have the greatest horrific effect. As an actual enjoyable musical experience, however, your appreciation for the score will depend entirely on your tolerance for extended periods of atonal, aggressive, at times viciously dark writing. For all it's [sic] intellectual design and thoughtful approach to orchestration and texture, this is still a horror score through and through." James Southall of Movie Wave wrote "The album doesn't perhaps provide the obvious thrills of Beltrami's most popular scores, but it feels like there's something going on at a deeper level here, there's a clear purpose to all the music and it's executed very well. At a shade under three quarters of an hour, the album's the perfect length given the material – any longer and it would suffer the danger of the spell the composer so carefully casts simply becoming too much."

Filmtracks.com wrote "World War Z is a frightfully generic tackling of the concept, even considering Beltrami's intelligent orchestral applications. There is very little narrative development in the work, and its textures and ambience seem recycled more often than not. As such, you get a work that bores you far more than it should, a disappointment in any "end of the world" context." James Christopher Monger of AllMusic wrote "Beltrami utilized offbeat instrumentation throughout the soundtrack, even going so far as to base the main theme off of the harmonic structure of the United States Emergency Alert System siren."

Pete Simons of Synchrotones wrote "The score bumps and grinds along, building tension; and as such it's hard to describe it as a ‘pleasant' experience. Having said that, it's as cleverly written as anything Beltrami has done. It contains two subtle themes that make a few (if only a few) appearances and the action music is genuinely exciting; though I wouldn't have minded hearing a few more thematic cues on this album. The large orchestral performance (and its recording) is crisp and the percussion provides a genuine drive to the whole affair. It just goes to show that you don't need a hundred drummers to make an impact. It also goes to show you don't need a battery of synthesizers to make those ostinato strings sound interesting. Beltrami infuses some well-chosen synthesizer sounds into his score, but it is the clarity and sheer force of the orchestra that makes this score truly exciting."

== Track listing ==
World War Z: Music from the Motion Picture
No.	Title	Length
1.	"Philadelphia"	4:03
2.	"The Lane Family"	2:47
3.	"Ninja Quiet"	2:54
4.	"Searching for Clues"	5:33
5.	"NJ Mart"	4:01
6.	"Zombies in Coach"	3:43
7.	"Hand Off!"	2:49
8.	"No Teeth No Bite"	3:25
9.	"The Salvation Gates"	4:24
10.	"Wales"	5:22
11.	"Like a River Around a Rock"	5:08
Total length:		44:09

== Credits ==
Credits adapted from AllMusic.

- Music – Marco Beltrami
- Additional music – Brandon Roberts, Buck Sanders, Marcus Trumpp
- Music producer, editor – John Finklea
- Programming – Brandon Roberts
- Assistant engineer – Jason Elliot, Scott Smith
- Recording, mixing – John Kurlander
- Mastering – Patricia Sullivan
- Executive producer – Randy Spendlove, Kenny Ochoa, Livia Tortella, Xavier Ramos
- Contractor – Isobel Griffiths, Jo Changer
- Coordinator – Jason Richmond
- Art Direction – BLT Communications

Instruments

- Bass – Andy Pask, Chris Laurence, Leon Bosch, Richard Pryce, Stacey Watton, Steve Rossell, Tim Amherst
- Bass clarinet – David Fuest, Nicholas Bucknall
- Bassoon – Richard Skinner, Gavin McNaughton
- Cello – Bozidar Vukotic, Caroline Dearnley, Chris Worsey, Dave Daniels, Ian Burdge, John Heley, Jonathan Williams, Josephine Knight, Martin Loveday, Tim Gill, Anthony Lewis
- Clarinet – Nicholas Bucknall
- Contrabass clarinet – David Fuest
- Contrabassoon – Gavin McNaughton
- Drums – Ian Thomas
- Flute – Helen Keen, Karen Jones
- French Horn – John Thurgood, Laurence Davies, Mike Thompson, Philip Eastop, Richard Berry, Richard Watkins
- Guitar – Leo Abrahams
- Percussion – Chris Baron, Frank Ricotti, Gary Kettel, Bill Lockhart
- Piano – David Hartley
- Timpani – Bill Lockhart
- Trombone – Andy Wood, Dave Stewart, Mike Hext, Richard Edwards
- Trumpet – Andy Crowley, John Barclay
- Tuba – Owen Slade, Phil Todd
- Viola – Bill Hawkes, Bob Smissen, Bruce White, Cathy Bradshaw, Clare Finnimore, Don Mc Vay, Gustav Clarkson, James Boyd, Peter Lale, Richard Cookson, Rusen Gunes, Steve Wright
- Violin – Alex Afia, Alison Dods, Charlie Brown, Chris Tombling, Daniel Bhattacharya, David Williams, Dave Woodcock, Dermot Crehan, Liz Edwards, Emil Chakalov, Gaby Lester, Ian Humphries, Jonathan Evans Jones, Jonathan Rees, Julian Tear, Kathy Gowers, Mark Berrow, Natalia Bonner, Nicky Sweeney, Patrick Kiernan, Rick Koster, Rita Manning, Rolf Wilson, Simon Baggs, Sonia Slany, Steve Morris, Tom Pigott-Smith, Warren Zielinski, Everton Nelson

Orchestra and choir

- Choir – Metro Voices
- Choir director – Jenny O'Grady
- Orchestration, conductor – Matt Dunkley
- Additional orchestration – David Foster, Jake Parker
- Concertmaster – Everton Nelson
