= Nightfall (1956 film) =

1956 film by Jacques Tourneur

- Theatrical release poster
- Directed by: Jacques Tourneur
- Screenplay by: Stirling Silliphant
- Based on: Nightfall; 1948 novel by David Goodis
- Produced by: Ted Richmond
- Starring: Aldo Ray; Brian Keith; Anne Bancroft
- Cinematography: Burnett Guffey
- Edited by: William A. Lyon
- Music by: George Duning
- Color process: Black and white
- Production company: Copa Productions
- Distributed by: Columbia Pictures
- Release date: December 5, 1956
- Running time: 79 minutes
- Country: United States
- Language: English

Nightfall is a 1956 American crime film noir directed by Jacques Tourneur and starring Aldo Ray, Brian Keith and Anne Bancroft.

The low-budget film is remembered today for camera work by cinematographer Burnett Guffey. It uses flashbacks as a device to tell the story, which was based on a 1948 novel by David Goodis.

The theme song, "Nightfall," was composed by Peter De Rose and "Charles Harold" (Charles H. Cuppett), with lyrics by Sam M. Lewis and sung by Al Hibbler.

== Plot ==
At night on a busy Los Angeles sidewalk, James "Jim" Vanning wanders aimlessly, avoiding bright lights and police cars, while he's being watched by another man, later revealed to be insurance investigator Ben Fraser. At a corner, Fraser asks Vanning for a light, and the two men chat briefly, with Vanning revealing that he is a veteran who fought on Okinawa in the war. Vanning enters a bar, sitting next to Marie Gardner, who has been nursing her drink because she has no cash to pay for it. Vanning pays for her drink, and the two have dinner together. As happens several times in the film, the scenes with Vanning are intercut with scenes of Fraser and his wife discussing Vanning, who is wanted for murder. Fraser's real interest is in retrieving $350,000 in stolen money for his company.

At dinner, Marie reveals that she is a model, while Vanning is a commercial artist who has lived in several places but does not say much else about his past. Leaving the restaurant, Marie and Vanning are encountered by two thuggish men, John and "Red". They thank Marie for distracting Vanning and she quickly goes away. The two men drive Vanning to a deserted spot by some oil pumps, demanding that Vanning tell them where to find the $350,000 that he took from them and threatening him with torture. Vanning insists that he does not know where the money is. The men discover a slip of paper with Marie's name, address, and phone number.

In intermittent flashbacks, the story of Vanning's troubles is revealed. Near the town of Moose, Wyoming, Vanning and his friend Dr. Edward "Doc" Gurston have been camping, hunting, and fishing. As they plan to leave because of an impending snowstorm, they see a car go off the road. John, whose arm has been fractured, and Red, emerge from the wreck. While Doc tends to John's arm, it is revealed that a bank has been robbed of $350,000 and a guard has been killed. Red pulls out a gun. The thieves are going to steal Doc's car, but wanting no witnesses, Red shoots Doc with a rifle that he places in Vanning's hand and then shoots Vanning with a pistol to make the scene look like a murder-suicide. The shot misses Vanning, but Red believes he's dead because a ricocheted piece of rock had struck Vanning and drawn blood. When Vanning comes to, he finds the men and the car gone, but discovers that they had taken Doc's medical bag instead of the one with the money. The killers soon realize their mistake and return. Vanning flees with the money through the snow to a deserted shack.

In the present, Vanning manages to escape from John and Red. He goes to Marie's apartment and angrily confronts her, believing she set him up. She convinces him that she was an innocent bystander and he convinces her that he is not guilty of Doc's murder as news accounts have suggested. When they spot John and Red coming out of a car on the street, they go out the building's back door to Vanning's apartment. There he tells her more of his story. He wants to retrieve the money from Wyoming to prove his innocence and has been waiting for the roads to clear there, but he will have to search for it because he really cannot remember where he left it go.

Marie agrees to go to Wyoming with Vanning after she has finished a modeling job at a fashion show. Vanning goes to the city bus station to buy tickets to the town of Moose. Fraser follows him and buys a seat on the same bus. Marie displays several outfits at the fashion show but spies John and Red in the audience. When Vanning arrives, she breaks away to tell him and the two run off.

When they reach Moose, Fraser reveals himself and his job to Vanning and that he believes in Vanning's innocence. In a rented car, Fraser, Vanning, and Marie drive to the campsite and head toward the shack that Vanning has recalled. They realize that John and Red have gotten there first and have found the bag with the money. Following a standoff, Red, intent on keeping all the money for himself, shoots John and retreats to a nearby snowplow which he drives toward the shack. Vanning manages to knock Red out of the cab and steer the plow away, but it runs directly into Red.

== Cast ==
- Aldo Ray as James "Jim" Vanning / Art Rayburn / Wilson
- Brian Keith as John
- Anne Bancroft as Marie Gardner
- Jocelyn Brando as Laura Fraser
- James Gregory as Ben Fraser
- Frank Albertson as Dr. Edward Gurston ("Doc")
- Rudy Bond as Red

== Production ==
The film was based on a novel by David Goodis published in 1948, that had been adapted for TV as Sure as Fate in 1950.

In July 1955, it was announced film rights had been purchased by Copa Productions, the film company of Ted Richmond and Tyrone Power, which released through Columbia Studios. Raphael Hayes was to write the script. Richmond wanted Edmond O'Brien or Barry Sullivan to play the male lead and Barbara Stanwyck to play the female lead, with filming to begin in September. William Wright was going to produce. Power did not want to appear in the film.

The lead role eventually went to Aldo Ray, who was under long-term contract to Columbia but had been on suspension for refusing the lead in Beyond Mombassa. Filming ended up beginning on March 12, 1956. Jacques Tourneur signed to direct and Anne Bancroft was cast in the female lead.

Filming took place in downtown Los Angeles, on Hollywood Boulevard, and other locations, including MacArthur Park and the J.W. Robinson department store, where the fashion show scene was filmed. The Wyoming scenes were filmed in Teton County.

== Release ==
Nightfall was released in early December 1956 in Boston in the United States.

== Reception ==
In a contemporary Boston Daily Globe review Marjory Adams declared Nightfall, "a heart-pounding experience that had all that a suspense-yearning public could hope for," but its plot had enough holes in it to “drive two trucks through". Variety published a review on December 5, 1956, stating that the film had "a generous slice of mystery, action and suspense" but the modest budget only delivered fair entertainment. A review in the Monthly Film Bulletin observed that despite the plot being complex and unlikely, the film unfolded “in an atmosphere of deliberate obscurity”, amplified by many flashbacks.

Film critic Alain Silver argued in 1992 that despite being made near the end of the cycle, and that even though the film's locations include bright snow-covered landscapes, the dilemma of Nightfall's protagonist is typically noir. Although he is a victim of several mischances, Vanning struggles to “comprehend how violent but basically simple past occurrences have put him in such a dangerous and complicated present."

Critic Dennis Schwartz wrote in 2005 that Jacques Tourneur got the most out of a “minor film noir about a paranoid man haunted by his past".

Critic Jay Seaver also wrote in 2005, "Nightfall isn't worried about purity of genre; it occasionally threatens to become an almost light-hearted caper movie..,” which he regarded as falling somewhere between mediocrity and Tourneur's very best.

== Legacy ==
The film was influential in Quentin Tarantino creating the Bruce Willis character in Pulp Fiction. Tarantino said, Willis "reminded me of a 50s leading man... a Ralph Meeker, Aldo Ray and Brian Keith kind of man. I went to his house and we did actually watch one print of an Aldo Ray movie, we watched Nightfall [1956]... [Ray and Brian Keith] have fantastic banter. And Brian Keith is excellent."

== See also ==
- List of American films of 1956
