= Snowpiercer (soundtrack) =

Snowpiercer: Original Motion Picture Soundtrack

Film score by Marco Beltrami
- Released: 21 August 2013
- Genre: Film score
- Length: 55:57
- Label: CJ E&M Music
- Producers: Marco Beltrami; Buck Sanders

Marco Beltrami chronology
The Wolverine (2013)	Snowpiercer (2013)	Carrie (2013)

Snowpiercer: Original Motion Picture Soundtrack is the album consisting of the original score composed by Marco Beltrami, for the Bong Joon-ho directorial Snowpiercer (2013). The album was published by CJ E&M Music, and released in South Korea on 21 August 2013, followed by an international release on 9 September. The soundtrack for the North American release, was distributed by Varèse Sarabande, and saw an official release on 11 June 2014.

== Production ==
Macro Beltrami, who was interested in Joon-ho's filmography, contacted him on a possible collaboration and also sent him some musical pieces. Joon-ho then sent his script to Beltrami on Skype, about the idea of the project, and Beltrami later came with the pieces of music on what it could work with the script. When Joon-ho came to Los Angeles, during the film's pre-production in May 2012, he sent the storyboards of the screenplay to Beltrami and discussed about the musical approach, which became fruitful and Beltrami later agreed to be onboard for the film. Joon-ho, on Beltrami's inclusion had said that he really liked his musical score for 3:10 to Yuma (2007), who described it as an "impressive soundtrack". On reading the script, Beltrami said that Joon-ho was open to creative ideas, and added that the story was an allegory, and told it in a surreal way, the music had three functions: "It had to the momentum of the characters moving forward on the train; it had to have the personal, emotional aspect of their struggle; and it had to represent this outside world that wasn't a part of what they were and what they longed for [the rich passengers at the front of the train]. These ideas had to be tied up together, and everything else is just coloring on those ideas."

While describing the setting as futuristic and also backwards, as "there are people in the train with not much technology", Beltrami used the old-fashioned musical instrument, such as cimbalom, a hammered dulcimer, which had an "antique quality". As certain scenes are synthetically achieved and processed, he used sounds that are acoustically based, but also blending electronic and classical music. For the second part of the axe fight, Beltrami used a non-instrumental sounding, recording from a storage container, as the sound had "metal and cavernous quality to this scene". The train cars in the sequence, have different thematic continuity, but also have their own synthetic sound. According to Beltrami, "The car where they have the axe fight is distinctly synthetic and metallic, a very processed sound. The school car is based on a kid's song. The whole thing with that concept was that the music should blend completely with the sound mix and create more of a sonic environment, rather than be a scoring thing. It changes depending on where the characters are in the story and the car itself."

In the original script, Beltrami was asked by Joon-ho to create a song, with the actors singing. He used the text lines from the script, and the storyboards to follow the timing, and created a musical tone played by Beltrami on a mouth organ and vocals performed by his kids, which eventually became the "Wilford Song". He sent the finished song to Joon-ho which he liked and later sent to the actors for recording. He described scoring for the sushi scene, as the toughest challenge, adding that, Joon-ho did not like using the same themes, and want to create a musical theme consisting of "piano music being played in a bar", which Beltrami mistook it to as cocktail music. Joon-ho later referred the scene from The Deer Hunter (1978) when the guy's playing piano in a bar, and added "You're playing inside the head of Nam [Kang-ho Song] here – sort of the life gone past", for which Beltrami understood the meaning of the scene.

== Release ==
Snowpiercer: Original Motion Picture Soundtrack was published by CJ E&M Music, which released first in South Korea on 21 August 2013. It later received an expanded international release on 9 September 2013, through digital and physical formats. Prior to the official album release, a single from the album, titled "Yona Lights" released nine months earlier, on 13 January 2013. Four of the instrumental compositions from the soundtrack was performed by Beltrami at the 007 Fimucité at Tenerife International Film Music Festival in the Canary Islands, held during 5–14 July 2013. Besides Snowpiercer, Beltrami also performed from the scores from Soul Surfer and The Wolverine.

On 11 June 2014, for the promotions of the North American theatrical release, Varèse Sarabande distributed the North American version of the Snowpiercer soundtrack, in digital and physical formats. The soundtrack release coincided with the Los Angeles Film Festival premiere, where Beltrami conducted a five-minute live performance of the score. The soundtrack was later released in two-disc set vinyl editions on 23 July 2014.

== Reception ==
Writing for Synchrotones, Pete Simons stated "There are a number of excellent cues here, particularly those featuring his perpetual motion theme. The orchestrations are really quite interesting (though sparse at times); and the use of woodwinds is particularly noteworthy. Like a locomotion, the score takes some time to really get going. The first half feel sluggish with many cues passing by almost unnoticed. It doesn't really pick up until track 13. But then... the orchestra starts to play a more prominent role, the themes become more pronounced and the whole atmosphere becomes more epic – culminating in the truly magnificent "This Is The Beginning"." James Southall of Movie Wave wrote "the score blends fierce action cues with very rugged suspense and drama – very effectively". Writing for RogerEbert.com, Seongyong Cho stated it as "a solid score while never stepping out of the line". Scott Foundas of Variety called the score as "excitingly big". We Are Movie Geeks chose the soundtracks as one of their "Top 15 film soundtracks of 2014".

== Accolades ==
Snowpiercer was shortlisted as one among the 118 possible contenders chosen by the Academy of Motion Picture Arts and Sciences for potential nominations in the Best Original Score category at the 87th Academy Awards. Beltrami's other musical works such as The Drop, The Giver and The Homesman, were included in the shortlist. But all of them, could not make into the final list of nominations. Beltrami was nominated for the World Soundtrack Awards for Film Composer of the Year, but lost to Alexandre Desplat. At the 50th Grand Bell Awards, he received a nomination for Best Music.

== Track listing ==
All music is composed by Marco Beltrami.

No.	Title	Length
1.	"This Is the End"	3:41
2.	"Stomp"	1:00
3.	"Preparation"	3:10
4.	"Requesting an Upgrade"	3:40
5.	"Take the Engine"	2:04
6.	"Axe Gang"	2:22
7.	"Axe Schlomo"	1:47
8.	"Blackout Fight"	4:24
9.	"Water Supply"	2:32
10.	"Go Ahead"	2:45
11.	"Sushi"	1:14
12.	"The Seven"	1:00
13.	"We Go Forward"	2:05
14.	"Steam Car"	2:38
15.	"Seoul Train"	2:26
16.	"Snow Melt"	2:02
17.	"Take My Place"	5:56
18.	"Yona Lights"	3:33
19.	"This Is the Beginning"	4:00
20.	"Yona's Theme"	3:38
Total length:		55:57
