= Burnett Guffey =

American cinematographer (1905–1983)

- Born: George Burnett Guffey; May 26, 1905; Del Rio, Tennessee, U.S.
- Died: May 30, 1983 (aged 78); Goleta, California, U.S.
- Spouse: Lucille A. Lyon Guffey (m.1927)
- Children: 2
- Parent(s): George Washington Guffey; Josephine Loubelle Fleming Guffey
- Awards: See below

President of the American Society of Cinematographers
- In office 1957–1958
- Preceded by: George J. Folsey
- Succeeded by: Walter Strenge

Burnett Guffey, ASC (May 26, 1905 – May 30, 1983) was an American cinematographer, who worked on over 100 films between 1929 and 1971. He won two Academy Awards for Best Cinematography — for From Here to Eternity (1953) and Bonnie and Clyde (1967) — out of five total nominations. He served as President of the American Society of Cinematographers from 1957 to 1958.

== Early life ==
Guffey was born in Del Rio, Tennessee on May 26, 1905, to Josephine Loubelle "Josie" (née Fleming) and Dr. George Washington Guffey. He was educated in Etowah. Prior to his filmmaking career, he worked as a messenger at a bank.

While still a teenager, Guffey began as a camera assistant in 1923 on John Ford's 1924 western saga The Iron Horse. He was then hired by the Famous Players–Lasky studios in 1927, became a camera operator in 1928 and worked there until 1943.

== Career ==
Between 1935 and 1944, Guffey worked as a camera operator on various well-known movies such as "Clive of India," "The Informer," "You Only Live Once," "Foreign Correspondent," "Seven Sinners," "That Hamilton Woman," and "Cover Girl."

Guffey first worked as a Director of Photography for Columbia Pictures in 1944 on the feature film "Sailor's Holiday." After his period at Columbia studio, he worked as a freelance cinematographer. He became well known for his clear visual style and excellent arrangement of shots, especially in film noir, having contributed to twenty of these films throughout his professional life.

During the span of 1944 to 1953, Guffey captured important movies like "My Name Is Julia Ross," "Framed," "Knock on Any Door," "The Reckless Moment," "All the King’s Men," "In a Lonely Place," "The Sniper," and "From Here to Eternity," earning his initial Oscar in his three decades career.

According to film critic Spencer Selby, Guffey was a prolific film noir cinematographer, shooting 20 of them, including In a Lonely Place (1950).

After winning an Oscar, Guffey went on to work on well-known movies such as Lang’s "Human Desire," Don Siegel’s "Private Hell 36," Lewis Seiler’s "The Bamboo Prison," Rudolph Maté’s "The Violent Men," Phil Karlson’s "Tight Spot," George Sherman’s "Count Three."

Between 1957 and 1962, Guffey worked on movies like Jack Garfein’s "The Strange One," Karlson’s "The Brothers Rico," Gerd Oswald’s "Screaming Mimi," Peter Glenville’s "Me and the Colonel," Paul Wendkos’ "Gidget," Rossen’s "They Came to Cordura," Karlson’s "Hell to Eternity," and John Frankenheimer’s "Birdman of Alcatraz," resulting in a third Oscar nomination for him.

He received his fourth Oscar nomination for his work on Bryan Forbes' 1965 film "King Rat" and his fifth nomination, along with his second Oscar, for Arthur Penn's 1967 film "Bonnie and Clyde."

Guffey's final notable movie was the 1970 film "The Great White Hope," directed by Martin Ritt. The next year, "The Steagle" was his last movie.

Guffey was the 21st President of the American Society of Cinematographers, serving one term between 1957 and 1958.

== Personal life ==
Guffey married Lucille A. Lyon in 1927, and had two daughters.

=== Death ===
Guffey died of a brief illness in Goleta, California on May 30, 1982, at the age of 78.

== Filmography ==
- Love Over Night (1928)
- Fairways and Foul (1929)
- Tahiti Nights (1944)
- The Unwritten Code (1944)
- Kansas City Kitty (1944)
- The Soul of a Monster (1944)
- U-Boat Prisoner (1944)
- Sailor's Holiday (1944)
- My Name Is Julia Ross (1945)
- The Girl of the Limberlost (1945)
- The Gay Senorita (1945)
- Blonde from Brooklyn (1945)
- Eve Knew Her Apples (1945)
- I Love a Mystery (1945)
- Eadie Was a Lady (1945)
- Gallant Journey (1946)
- So Dark the Night (1946)
- Night Editor (1946)
- A Bird in the Head (1946)
- The Notorious Lone Wolf (1946)
- Meet Me on Broadway (1946)
- A Close Call for Boston Blackie (1946)
- The Fighting Guardsman (1946)
- Framed (1947)
- Johnny O'Clock (1947)
- The Gallant Blade (1948)
- The Sign of the Ram (1948)
- To the Ends of the Earth (1948)
- And Baby Makes Three (1949)
- All the King's Men (1949)
- The Reckless Moment (1949)
- The Undercover Man (1949)
- Knock on Any Door (1949)
- Emergency Wedding (1950)
- Convicted (1950)
- In a Lonely Place (1950)
- Father Is a Bachelor (1950)
- The Family Secret (1951)
- Two of a Kind (1951)
- Sirocco (1951)
- Assignment – Paris! (1952)
- The Sniper (1952)
- Scandal Sheet (1952)
- From Here to Eternity (1953)
- The Last Posse (1953)
- The Bamboo Prison (1954)
- Private Hell 36 (1954)
- Human Desire (1954)
- Three Stripes in the Sun (1955)
- Count Three and Pray (1955)
- Tight Spot (1955)
- The Violent Men (1955)
- Storm Center (1956)
- The Harder They Fall (1956)
- Battle Stations (1956)
- Decision at Sundown (1957)
- The Brothers Rico (1957)
- The Strange One (1957)
- Nightfall (1957)
- Me and the Colonel (1958)
- Screaming Mimi (1958)
- The True Story of Lynn Stuart (1958)
- Edge of Eternity (1959)
- They Came to Cordura (1959)
- Gidget (1959)
- Let No Man Write My Epitaph (1960)
- Hell to Eternity (1960)
- The Mountain Road (1960)
- Mr. Sardonicus (1961)
- Homicidal (1961)
- Cry for Happy (1961)
- Kid Galahad (1962)
- Birdman of Alcatraz (1962)
- Good Neighbor Sam (1964)
- Flight from Ashiya (1964)
- King Rat (1965)
- The Silencers (1966)
- The Ambushers (1967)
- Bonnie and Clyde (1967)
- How to Succeed in Business Without Really Trying (1967)
- The Split (1968)
- The Madwoman of Chaillot (1969)
- Some Kind of a Nut (1969)
- The Learning Tree (1969)
- Where It's At (1969)
- Halls of Anger (1970)
- The Great White Hope (1970)
- Suppose They Gave a War and Nobody Came (1970)
- The Steagle (1971)

== Publications ==
- "The Photography of King Rat," in American Cinematographer (Hollywood), December 1965.

== Awards and nominations ==
Award	Year	Category	Work	Result	Ref.
Academy Award	1954	Best Cinematography, Black-and-White	From Here to Eternity	Won	
Academy Award	1957	Best Cinematography, Black-and-White	The Harder They Fall	Nominated	
Academy Award	1963	Best Cinematography, Black-and-White	Birdman of Alcatraz	Nominated	
Academy Award	1966	Best Cinematography, Black-and-White	King Rat	Nominated	
Academy Award	1968	Best Cinematography	Bonnie and Clyde	Won	
Golden Globe Award	1958	Best Cinematography, Black-and-White	All the King's Men	Nominated	
