= Three Stripes in the Sun =

1955 American film directed by Richard Murphy

- Directed by: Richard Murphy
- Written by: Albert Duffy (adaptation)
- Screenplay by: Richard Murphy
- Based on: E.J. Kahn Jr. (The New Yorker article The Gentle Wolfhound)
- Produced by: Fred Kohlmar
- Starring: Aldo Ray; Philip Carey; Dick York
- Cinematography: Burnett Guffey
- Edited by: Charles Nelson
- Music by: George Duning
- Production company: Columbia Pictures
- Distributed by: Columbia Pictures
- Release date: November 23, 1955 (New York City)
- Running time: 93 minutes
- Country: United States
- Language: English

Three Stripes in the Sun is a 1955 American war film directed by Richard Murphy and starring Aldo Ray, Philip Carey and Dick York.

It is based upon the true story of MSgt Hugh O'Reilly, who was stationed in Japan after World War II who falls for a local girl.

== Plot ==
MSgt. Hugh O'Reilly and his friend, Cpl. "Nebby" Muhllendorf, are assigned to peacetime Osaka, Japan after the end of World War II. Still upset over his experiences at Pearl Harbor, O'Reilly unsuccessfully asks his colonel for a transfer.

O'Reilly's prejudices continue to surface, particularly when his wallet is missing and presumed stolen. After he finds a Japanese man with it, O'Reilly intends to seek retribution until he learns that the man runs an orphanage and was simply returning a wallet that he found.

O'Reilly and Nebby visit the orphanage and, moved by its impoverished conditions, donate money and food. O'Reilly also develops a romantic interest in a local girl, Yuko, but believes a future together would be difficult. He decides to break off contact with Yuko after the outbreak of conflict in Korea, but when he and Nebby are wounded and return to Japan, he and Yuko decide to try a life together in the United States.

== Cast ==
- Aldo Ray as MSgt. Hugh O'Reilly
- Philip Carey as Col. William Shepherd (as Phil Carey)
- Dick York as Cpl. Nebby Muhlendorf
- Chuck Connors as Idaho Johnson
- Camille Janclaire as Sister Genevieve
- Hehachirô Ôkawa as Father Yoshida (as Heihachirô 'Henry' Ôkawa)
- Tatsuo Saitô as Konoya
- Tamao Nakamura as Satsumi
- Mitsuko Kimura as Yuko, the translator
