= A Good Day to Die Hard (soundtrack) =

A Good Day to Die Hard: Original Motion Picture Soundtrack

Soundtrack album by Marco Beltrami
- Released: February 12, 2013
- Recorded: 2012–2013
- Studios: Newman Scoring Stage, 20th Century Fox, Los Angeles
- Genre: Film score
- Length: 64:39
- Label: Sony Classical
- Producers: Marco Beltrami; Buck Sanders

Marco Beltrami chronology
Warm Bodies (2013)	A Good Day to Die Hard: Original Motion Picture Soundtrack (2013)	World War Z (2013)

A Good Day to Die Hard: Original Motion Picture Soundtrack is the film score soundtrack to the 2013 film A Good Day to Die Hard, the fifth and final instalment in the Die Hard film series. Marco Beltrami composed the film score, his second film in the Die Hard series. The album was released under the Sony Classical Records label on February 12, 2013.

== Development ==
Marco Beltrami who previously scored Live Free or Die Hard (2007) returned to score music for A Good Day; he previously associated with director John Moore on Flight of the Phoenix (2004), The Omen (2006) and Max Payne (2008). Beltrami incorporated Kamen's thematic material from the first three films into the score for Live Free or Die Hard.Beltrami composed the score entirely in 9/8 time signature mimicking Kamen's composition under minor ninth chords and used odd harmonies as a modernistic approach.

Moore referenced Lalo Schifrin's action music to evoke the 1970s and 1980s feel, which Beltrami led to utilize horns, harmonica, muted brass, triangles and bongos, where most action film scores does not utilize it due to its clichéd nature. The Russian flavor was emulated with the use of instruments such as Balalaika and dulcimers to an extent. Moore instructed on Beltrami that how the Russian military drums sounded different to the American drums, which led Beltrami to modify the percussion styles.

For the cue "McClane's Brain", Beltrami called few Balalaika, harmonic and saxophone players to record the piece and wrote things that they wanted to sample as well as music which would become an integral part of the score. As they jammed on with numerous ideas, they ended up with this particular cue which became the aforementioned composition. The piece was not played to McClane until the last day of the recording where the director had to search on that particular cue. The cue only used in the film's end credits.

Beltrami had nearly six weeks to write the film's score, which led his protégés and fellow musicians Buck Sanders, Marcus Trumpp and Brandon Roberts to assist him on the score. While Sanders programmed the score, Trumpp and Roberts composed additional pieces. The scoring sessions happened in parallel when the film was still under production with additional scenes being shot. In the end, he wrote nearly 120 minutes of music out of which, 80 of those minutes were included in the final film.

== Release ==
The film's score soundtrack was distributed by Sony Classical Records and released it digitally on February 12, 2013, followed by a physical release on February 19.

== Reception ==
Filmtracks.com summarised "Overall, his second entry by Beltrami into the franchise is more satisfying than its predecessor, but you have to realize just how far the sound of these films has come over the decades of the concept's existence on screen. Gone is the prickly suspense of yesteryear, replaced by straight forward action that will please a different set of listeners. That said, you have to commend Beltrami and his crew for their obvious, fantastic loyalty to Kamen's identity for the lead character and their refusal to abandon that integrity despite a very challenging production process. For some action-oriented film music collectors, this score will be the best listening experience in the franchise."

Gregory Heaney of AllMusic wrote "the score for A Good Day to Die Hard definitely feels like it's adapted to the series' change in scope." A. O. Scott of The New York Times called it as a "bludgeoning score", while Peter Debruge of Variety described it as "pulsating". Sean Wilson of MFiles called it as "an entertainingly tongue-in-cheek score from one of Hollywood's most overlooked composers." Chris Bumbray of JoBlo.com wrote "Marco Beltrami's score – which echoes Kamen's themes from the early movies, tries to make you think you're watching something exciting." Lisa Kennedy of The Denver Post wrote "Marco Beltrami (who's done better) composed a score that is standard-issue action: insistent to the point of flat-out pushy."

== Track listing ==
A Good Day to Die Hard: Original Motion Picture Soundtrack track listing
No.	Title	Length
1.	"Yuri Says"	2:19
2.	"Getting Yuri to the Van"	2:14
3.	"Jack Makes the Call"	2:53
4.	"Everyone to the Courthouse"	3:09
5.	"Court Adjourned"	2:19
6.	"Truckzilla"	3:38
7.	"Yippie Kay Yay, Mother Russia!"	1:54
8.	"Truckzilla"	2:00
9.	"Father & Son"	1:24
10.	"To the Safe House"	1:51
11.	"Regroup"	2:30
12.	"Leaving the Safe House"	1:59
13.	"Getting to the Dance Floor"	1:34
14.	"Too Many Kolbasas on the Dance Floor"	3:53
15.	"What's So Funny?"	2:30
16.	"McClanes Get the Bird"	3:00
17.	"Scumbags"	2:05
18.	"Entering Chernobyl"	4:07
19.	"Into the Vault"	2:17
20.	"Rubbed Out at the Spa"	2:07
21.	"Sunshine Shootout"	1:37
22.	"Get to the Choppa!"	2:59
23.	"Chopper Takedown"	3:26
24.	"It's Hard to Kill a McClane"	2:59
25.	"Triple Vodka Rhapsody"	1:55
26.	"McClane's Brain"	2:00
Total length:		64:39

== Personnel ==
- Music – Marco Beltrami
- Additional music – Brandon Roberts, Marcus Trumpp
- Programming – Buck Sanders
- Engineer – Denis St. Amand
- Digital recordist – Vincent Cirilli, Tim Lauber
- Recording and mixing – John Kurlander
- Assistant mixing – Tyson Lozensky
- Mastering – Erick Labson
- Supervising music editor – Jim Schultz
- Additional music editor – Jay Duerr

Orchestra

- Orchestration – Andrew Kinney, Dana Niu, Jon Kull, Pete Anthony, Rossano Galante
- Concertmaster – Belinda Broughton
- Conductor – Pete Anthony
- Contractor – Peter Rotter
- Copyist – Joann Kane Music Service, Mark Graham
- Stage manager – Christine Sirois, Tom Stell

Instruments

- Bass – Bruce Morgenthaler, Christian Kollgaard, David Parmeter, Drew Dembowski, Edward Meares, Michael Valerio, Neil Garber, Nico Abondolo, Nicolas Philippon, Stephen Dress, Timothy Eckert
- Bassoon – Kenneth Munday, Rose Corrigan
- Cello – Andrew Shulman, Armen Ksajikian, Cecilia Tsan, Christina Soule, Dennis Karmazyn, Erika Duke-Kirkpatrick, George Kim Scholes, John Walz, Patricia Rynearson, Paula Hochhalter, Steve Erdody, Timothy Landauer, Trevor Handy, Xiaodan Zheng
- Clarinet – Gary Bovyer, Ralph Williams
- Flute – Geraldine Rotella, Giampiero Ambrosi, John Yoakum, Sara Andon, Stephen Kujala
- Guitar – Andrew Synowiec, George Doering
- Harmonica – Jimmie Wood
- Harp – JoAnn Turovsky, Marcia Dickstein
- Horn – Brian O'Connor, Daniel Kelley, David Everson, James Thatcher, Jenny Kim, Mark Adams, Phillip Yao, Steven Becknell
- Keyboards – Bryan Pezzone
- Oboe – Leslie Reed, Phillip Ayling
- Percussion – Alan Estes, Gregory Goodall, Marvin B. Gordy III, Steven Schaeffer, Wade Culbreath
- Saxophone – Doug Webb
- Trombone – Alan Kaplan, Alexander Iles, William Reichenbach, William Booth
- Trumpet – Barry Perkins, David Wailes, David Washburn, Jon Lewis, Rick Baptist
- Tuba – Doug Tornquist
- Viola – Alma Fernandez, Andrew Duckles, Brian Dembow, Darrin McCann, David Walther, Jennie Hansen, Jerome Gordon, Kazi Pitelka, Lauren Chipman, Maria Newman, Matthew Funes, Pamela Jacobson, Pamela Goldsmith, Robert Brophy, Scott Hosfeld, Shawn Mann, Thomas Diener, Victoria Miskolczy
- Violin – Agnes Gottschewski, Alwyn Wright, Alyssa Park, Amy Hershberger, Belinda Broughton, Bruce Dukov, Charlie Bisharat, Darius Campo, Dimitrie Leivici, Elizabeth Hedman, Endre Granat, Eun-Mee Ahn, Helen Nightengale, Irina Voloshina, Jay Rosen, Jessica Guideri, Joel Pargman, Josefina Vergara, Julie Ann Gigante, Katia Popov, Kevin Connolly, Lisa Sutton, Lorand Lokuszta, Lorenz Gamma, Marc Sazer, Maya Magub, Miwako Watanabe, Natalie Leggett, Neil Samples, Phillip Levy, Radu Pieptea, Rafael Rishik, Roberto Cani, Roger Wilkie, Sara Parkins, Sarah Thornblade, Serena McKinney, Shalini Vijayan, Steven Zander, Tamara Hatwan
