= Dark Sanity =

- 1983 VIPCO VHS artwork
- Directed by: Martin Green
- Screenplay by: Larry Hilbrand; Phillip Pine
- Produced by: Ben Brothers
- Starring: Aldo Ray; Kory Clark; Chuck Jamison
- Cinematography: John McCoy
- Edited by: Jack Ruggiero
- Music by: John Bath
- Production company: Benmar Productions
- Distributed by: VIPCO (United Kingdom); Marquis Home Video (Canada); Prism Entertainment (United States)
- Release date: 1982
- Running time: 89 minutes
- Country: United States
- Language: English

Dark Sanity (also released as Straight Jacket) is a 1982 American psychological slasher film directed by Martin Green and starring Aldo Ray, Chuck Jamison, and Kory Clark. It follows a recovering alcoholic woman who begins suffering disturbing psychic visions in her new home, the site of a brutal murder.

== Plot ==
Karen Nichols is a recovering alcoholic who is plagued by strange visions that may be psychic in origin. After being released from a hospital, Karen and her businessman husband, Alan, relocate from San Diego to a home in the Los Angeles hills. Just after moving in, Karen meets her neighbor, Madge Harper, a talkative middle-aged woman who resides across the street with her husband, Henry. She also meets Benny, a developmentally-disabled landscaper who manicures the yards in the neighborhood.

When Alan invites his boss and his boss's wife for dinner, Karen is disturbed by visions of a severed hand in her bedroom and a cloaked figure on the staircase. Unnerved, Karen attends an Alcoholics Anonymous meeting, but is again plagued by visions and flees. Karen nearly relapses in a bar, but is stopped by Larry Craig, a retired police sergeant who investigated a brutal axe murder that occurred in Karen's house one year earlier. The victim, Lucy Duncan, was a doppelgänger for Karen who was apparently murdered by her jealous son. Larry recounts to Karen that he also experienced strange occurrences in the home, and that Lucy's severed head was never located.

Larry returns Karen to her house, where she insists he tell the story to Alan. A hostile Alan chastises Karen and disregards Larry as a con artist. When Karen later questions Madge about Lucy Duncan, Madge suggests that Larry was having an affair with her, and became obsessed with the case after she died, frequently loitering in the neighborhood. His obsessive actions resulted in him being fired from the police force, and he was also a suspect in the murder. Later, Lucy's beloved cat, who has roamed the neighborhood since her murder, enters the house and flees into a crawlspace. While attempting to find the cat, Karen and Benny discover Lucy's severed head beneath a crawlspace entry in a closet.

Karen accompanies Larry to a psychiatric hospital to visit Lucy's son Edward, after which Larry admits to Karen that Edward may be his biological son. That night, Karen returns home and finds Alan drunk, angered over having been fired from his job. Alan attacks Karen, questioning her whereabouts, before fleeing. Outside, Madge approaches Karen, who rebuffs her. In the house, Karen begins to drink from Alan's whiskey bottle.

The next day, Larry confronts Benny, who has been drinking all day at a bar, accusing him of Lucy's murder. While attacking Benny, Larry experiences a psychic vision that he realizes is a premonition, and flees to Karen's house. There, Karen, drunk, also begins experiencing visions, while a cloaked figure with an axe breaks into the house. When Karen finds Lucy's cat murdered in the bathroom, the assailant attacks her and is revealed to be Madge. During the chase, Larry arrives, and Madge falls from a window and is seriously injured.

Later, at the hospital, a psychiatrist explains to Alan and Larry that Madge's murder of Lucy and attempted murder of Karen were driven by her irrational fears that her husband was being unfaithful to her with the neighborhood women. In another room, Karen, driven mad, laughs maniacally in a straight jacket.

== Cast ==
- Aldo Ray as Larry Craig
- Kory Clark as Karen Nichols
- Chuck Jamison as Alan Nichols
- Bobbie Holt as Madge Harper
- Andy Gwyn as Henry Harper
- Timothe McCormack as Benny
- Barry Robison as Lt. Ed Desmond
- Harry Carlson as Mr. Jacobs
- Dennis Barnett as Edward
- Iris Bath as Mrs. Duncan

== Production ==
Dark Sanity marked director Martin Green's second and final feature film credit, following the 1966 independent film Footsteps in the Snow. Some sources indicate a copyright date for the film of 1978.

== Release ==
Dark Sanity was released directly to video, sometimes under the alternative title Straight Jacket. The United Kingdom-based distributor VIPCO issued a VHS under the Dark Sanity title in 1983, followed by another release from the Canadian-based Marquis Entertainment in 1984. It was released again under this title in the United States by Prism Entertainment on April 2, 1989.

Ariel International Releasing (AIR) released it on VHS in the United States under the title Straight Jacket in 1987; Trans Films released a VHS the same year under this title. It was issued again as Straight Jacket by Genesis Home Video in 1988.

== Reception ==
Cavett Binion of AllMovie wrote: "Poor performances and slack pacing derail most of the suspense and reveal the rank amateurism of the filmmakers." Gary Dobbs of the Rhondda Leader praised the film, calling it a "curio" and "virtually bloodless but a brilliant psychological thriller that really raises the viewer's hackles."

In the book Bleeding Skull!: A 1980s Trash-Horror Odyssey (2013), writer Joseph Ziemba described the film as "a rambling series of nonsequiturs presented with complete ineptitude.... [it] is simply an abnormal cinematic experience in the form of a no-budget slasher."

== Sources ==
- Stanley, John (2000). Creature Features: The Science Fiction, Fantasy, and Horror Movie Guide. New York City, New York: Berkley Boulevard Books. ISBN 978-0-425-17517-0.
- Weldon, Michael (1996). The Psychotronic Video Guide To Film. New York City, New York: St. Martin's Griffin. ISBN 978-0-312-13149-4.
- Ziemba, Joseph A.; Budnik, Dan (2013). Bleeding Skull!: A 1980s Trash-Horror Odyssey. London, England: Headpress. ISBN 978-1-900-48688-0.
