= Equinovalgus =

Medical condition

An equinovalgus is a deformity of the human foot. It may be a flexible deformity or a fixed deformity. Equino- means plantarflexed (as in standing on one's toes), and valgus means that the base of the heel is rotated away from the midline of the foot (eversion) and abduction of foot. This means that the patient is placing their weight on the medial border of the foot, and the arch of the foot is absent, which distorts the foot's normal shape.

Equinovalgus mostly occurs due to tightness of plantar flexors (calf muscles) and peroneus group of muscles.
