= Cowboys: A Documentary Portrait =

2019 documentary film

- Directed by: Bud Force & John Langmore
- Produced by: Bud Force, John Langmore, Felicitas Funke, Jeffrey Brown
- Cinematography: Bud Force, Hank Wisrodt, Tito West
- Edited by: Lucas J. Harger
- Music by: Ian McLeod, Matthew Sedivy, Suvo Sur
- Production company: 1922 Films | Ultralite Films
- Distributed by: ro*co films
- Release dates: October 25, 2019 (Austin Film Festival); November 17, 2020
- Country: United States

Cowboys: A Documentary Portrait is a 2019 documentary film directed by Bud Force and John Langmore. The feature-length movie gives viewers a glimpse into the lives of modern working cowboys on America's largest and most remote cattle ranches - some of which are over one million acres and still require full crews of horseback mounted men and women to tend large herds of cattle. Narrated through first-hand accounts from the cowboys themselves, the story explores the rewards and hardships of a celebrated but misunderstood way of life, including the challenges that lie ahead for the cowboys critical to providing the world's supply of beef. The film premiered at the Austin Film Festival October 25, 2019 and won the Audience Choice Award. Cowboys also screened at numerous other theatrical events throughout 2019 and was released worldwide on November 17, 2020 by distributor ro*co films, where it received positive reviews from both national and international audiences.

== Production ==
Co-director and cinematographer/DP Bud Force began pre-production on Cowboys: A Documentary Portrait in the summer of 2015 with film production company Ultralite Films. A former bull rider and cowboy, Force wanted to create a feature-length documentary about the working cowboy that was both authentic and cinematic. In 2016, he partnered with still photographer and former working cowboy John Langmore (co-director/producer) to form 1922 Films and create a teaser for the film. Shortly thereafter, German born filmmaker and publisher Felicitas Funke became the film's creative producer and third partner of 1922 Films.

Filming lasted two years in eight states on ten of the largest cattle ranches across the American West. In 2018, Lucas J. Harger began editing the film into its final 80 minute feature form, which features a combination of seasonal and emotional acts. No scenes in the film were staged outside of the interviews, which were conducted with the cowboys themselves.

The film's storyline is structured to provide an authentic portrayal of the contemporary working cowboy while limiting the romantic or idealized portrayals often found in western film cinema. The viewer learns about the actual work performed on large cattle ranches over the course of four seasons, but the narrative also explores the actual lives of the cowboys and their families.

The cinematography style was based upon Force's vision to include a combination of slow motion, direct cinema, and dramatic vista aerials. Working with Hank Wisrodt and Tito West, the crew used multiple cameras to capture the American West in a manner that is aesthetic yet authentic. Langmore's black and white still photographs serve as a visual juxtaposition, punctuating scenes for audience reflection throughout the film.

Upon reaching picture lock, Harger, Force, and composer Ian McLeod worked with musicians Suvo Sur and Matthew Sedivy to create an original music score inspired by classic Western movie composers such as Elmer Bernstein and Jerome Moross. Select additional songs were licensed for the film; including My Rifle, My Pony, and Me performed by Dean Martin and Ricky Nelson; and Skyball Paint, performed by Daniel Kenneth Libby and A Cowboy's Dream performed by The Firesides. The film was distributed internationally November 17, 2020 by ro*co films.

== Reception ==
Cowboys: A Documentary Portrait won the Audience Choice Award during its world premiere at the 2019 Austin Film Festival. It went on to become an official selection and screen at multiple festivals across the United States. The film was well received upon its international release November 17, 2020, with industry and western publications/media describing the film as one of the most authentic documentaries ever produced about the contemporary working cowboy
