= Sweet Savage (film) =

1979 pornographic film by Ann Perry

- Film Poster
- Directed by: Ann Perry
- Written by: Ann Perry
- Starring: Carol Connors; Aldo Ray; Beth Anna; John Hollabaugh; Jack Birch
- Cinematography: Jack Deerson
- Edited by: Carlton Way
- Production companies: Superbitch Productions; Evolution Enterprises
- Distributed by: TVX; Caballero Control Corporation (CCC); Alpha Blue Archives; VCX; Alpha Blue Archive
- Release date: June 1979; (US)
- Running time: 76 minutes
- Country: United States
- Language: English

Sweet Savage is a 1979 American pornographic Western film written and directed by Ann Perry and starring porn performers Carol Connors and Jack Birch along with straight acting veteran Aldo Ray, a Golden Globe nominee, in a non-sex role. Along with Russ Meyer's nudie-cutie Wild Gals of the Naked West (1962) and the hardcore A Dirty Western (1975), it is one of the few pornographic films in the American Western movie genre.

== Cast ==
- Carol Connors as Miss Lilly
- Aldo Ray as Banner
- Beth Anna as Shy Dove
- John Hollabaugh as Damon
- Jack Birch as Mr. Bret
- Eileen Welles as Jamie

== Release ==
The film was released in California and Houston, Texas, in June 1979. A 'cool' version with the explicit sex scenes removed was also released in certain theatres. The 'cool' version was due for release in Redding, California, but the print was confiscated by authorities, the city's first attempt to prevent the showing of an allegedly obscene film. The film opened in New York in July 1979.

== Awards ==
in 1980, Ray was awarded Best Actor from the Adult Film Association's third Erotica Awards.
