= Long Jeanne Silver =

American former pornographic actress

- Born: Tempe, Arizona, U.S.
- Other names: Long Jeanie Silvers; Joan Beattie; Jean Silver; Long Jean Silver; Jean Fulda
- Occupation: Pornographic actress
- Children: 1

Long Jeanne Silver is an American former pornographic actress, known for using the stump of her amputated leg to penetrate her sexual partner in her movies during the 1970s and 1980s.

Silver was born in Tempe, Arizona. She was born with a missing fibula in one leg which required the bottom half of it to be amputated. She ran away from home at age 16 in 1976 to go to New York City, where she began to pose for adult magazines and perform in porn films.

Prior to pornography, she worked as a stripper. She was also featured in the self-titled movie, Long Jeanne Silver. She also was a centerfold for Cheri magazine.

Annie Sprinkle and Silver were once arrested in Rhode Island for producing a magazine that featured a shoot in which Silver penetrated Sprinkle with her stump. The typesetter the magazine hired turned out to be an undercover police officer. The police surveilled them for a month before arresting the group. Multiple obscenity and sodomy-related felony charges were brought against Silver and Sprinkle, all of which were eventually dropped.
