= Aldo Ray =

American actor (1926–1991)

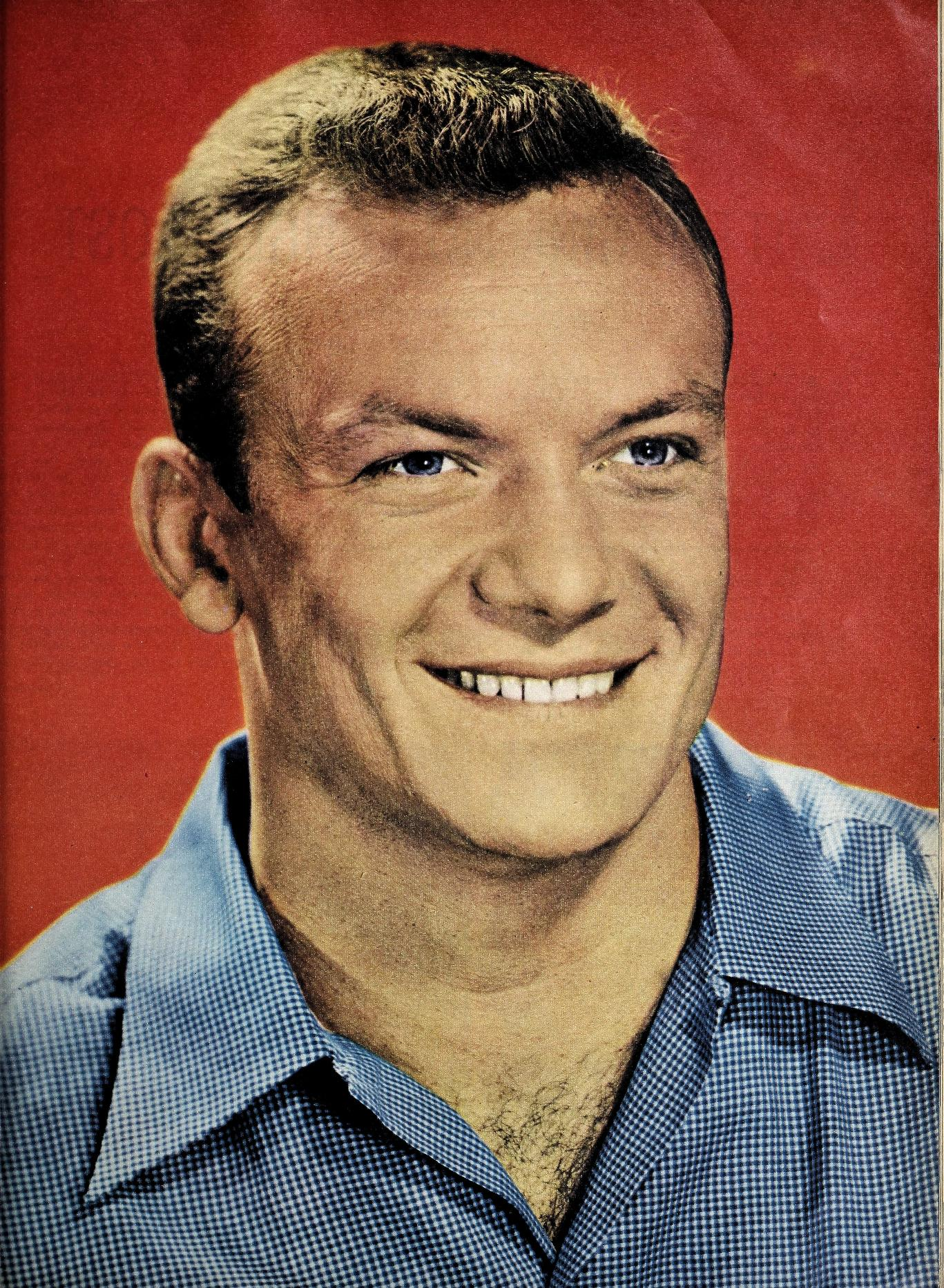
- Ray in 1955
- Born: Aldo Da Re; September 25, 1926; Pen Argyl, Pennsylvania, U.S.
- Died: March 27, 1991 (aged 64); Martinez, California, U.S.
- Education: University of California, Berkeley
- Occupation: Actor
- Years active: 1951–1991
- Spouses: Shirley Green (m. 1947; div. 1953); Jeff Donnell (m. 1954; div. 1956); Johanna Ray (m. 1960; div. 1967)
- Children: 4, including Eric Da Re
- Military career
- Allegiance: United States
- Branch: United States Navy
- Service years: 1944–1946
- Rank: Seaman First Class
- Units: UDT-17; USS Lipan (AT-85)
- Conflicts: World War II: Battle of Okinawa

Aldo Ray (born Aldo Da Re; September 25, 1926 – March 27, 1991) was an American actor of film and television. He began his career as a contract player for Columbia Pictures before achieving stardom through his roles in The Marrying Kind, Pat and Mike (which earned him a Golden Globe nomination), Let's Do It Again, and Battle Cry. His athletic build and gruff, raspy voice saw him frequently typecast in "tough guy" roles throughout his career, which lasted well into the late 1980s.

Though the latter part of his career was marked by appearances in low-budget B-movies and exploitation films, he still appeared occasionally in higher-profile features, including The Secret of NIMH (1982) and The Sicilian (1987).

== Early life and education ==
Ray was born Aldo Da Re in Pen Argyl, Pennsylvania, on September 25, 1926, to an Italian family (his father was born in Vittorio Veneto), with five brothers (Mario, Guido, Dante, Dino, and Louis) and one sister (Regina). His brother Mario Da Re (1933–2010) lettered in football at USC from 1952 to 1954 and appeared as a contestant on the May 12, 1955, edition of Groucho Marx's NBC-TV quiz show You Bet Your Life. His family moved to the small town of Crockett, California, when Aldo was four years old. His father worked as a laborer at the C&H Sugar Refinery, the largest employer in the town. He attended John Swett High School, where he made the football team; he also coached swimming.

At age 18, during World War II in 1944, Ray entered the United States Navy, serving as a frogman until 1946; he saw action at Okinawa with UDT-17. Upon leaving the Navy in May 1946, he returned to Crockett. He studied and played football at Vallejo Junior College and then entered the University of California at Berkeley to study political science. (Ray later described himself as an "arch conservative" and a "right-winger".) He left college in order to run for the office of constable of the Crockett Judicial District in Contra Costa County, California. "I always knew I was going to be a big man, but I thought it would be in politics," he said.

== Career ==
=== Saturday's Hero ===
In April 1950, Columbia Pictures sent a unit to San Francisco to look for some athletes to appear in a film they were making called Saturday's Hero (1951). Aldo's brother Guido saw an item in the San Francisco Chronicle about the auditions and asked his brother to drive him there. Director David Miller was more interested in Ray than in his brother because of his voice; also, Ray was comfortable talking to the camera owing to his political experience. He later recalled, "They... said, 'What's wrong with your voice kid? Are you sick? If you're sick you don't belong here.' I said, 'No, no, no, this is the way I've always spoken.' And they loved it." Ray would later retell this story in the trailer for Pat and Mike.

Ray signed a contract and was sent to Los Angeles for a screen test. He was cast in the small role of a cynical college football player opposite John Derek and Donna Reed.

Ray worked on the film between the primary and general elections. He was elected constable on June 6. "I was 23 and a sort of child bride to the voters," he later said. "The guy I ran against was a 16-year incumbent, and I destroyed him with 80 percent of the vote! I was going to work my way up to the U.S. Senate, see, and I would've, too."

Columbia picked up its option on Ray's services and signed him to a seven-year contract. "Of all the people in the picture they took up only one option—mine," he said. "And I said, 'Thank you, goodbye. I'm going home where I can be a big fish in my small pond. You can take this town (Hollywood) and shove it."

Columbia refused to release him from his contract and put him under suspension, giving him a leave of absence to work as constable. "I told them I couldn't care less, they could give me whatever they wanted," he said. Ray started his new job in November 1950.

=== Hollywood stardom: The Marrying Kind ===
After several months, Ray found "the quiet life... monotonous", so he contacted Max Arnow, talent director at Columbia, and expressed interest in appearing in more movies. Four weeks later, Arnow called back, saying Columbia wanted to audition Ray for a small part in Judy Holliday's new movie The Marrying Kind.

Ray went to Hollywood and did a screen test with the director, George Cukor. The first test went badly, but head of Columbia Harry Cohn liked Ray and asked for another test. The second one was done opposite (Miss) Jeff Donnell, whom Ray later married; it was more successful and Ray ended up being cast in the lead.

Harry Cohn felt the name "Aldo Da Re" was too close to "Dare" and wanted to change it to "John Harrison"; the actor refused and "Aldo Ray" was the compromise. He divorced his wife and resigned as constable in September 1951. His studio salary was $200 a week.

Cukor famously suggested that Ray go to ballet school because he walked too much like a football player. The director later talked about the actor:

He has a great advantage: the way his eyes are made. The light comes into them. There are certain people who have opaque eyes which refuse to catch the light. But his eyes had a certain glow and gave quite well in the photographed result. He did this silent scene very well lying there on the bed in the same room with Judy (Holliday). Then later he did comedy scenes with her—very difficult ones—and there were also emotional sequences where he broke down and cried. They were brilliant.

"Cukor is hypersensitive to reality", recalled Ray. "He told me exactly what to do and why. He explains everything and he knows exactly what he wants."

Ray's performance was much praised. Sight & Sound later commented:

To give the performance he did in The Marrying Kind after so little previous experience was clear evidence that in Aldo Ray the screen had discovered one of its rare "naturals". This was no carefully edited, tricked out performance, but a strikingly sincere and imaginative interpretation: an exceptional talent responding to a finely intuitive director... There was about him none of the personality assurance that extracts a special consideration of the actor as distinct from his role.

Cukor then cast Ray in a supporting role in Pat and Mike, starring Spencer Tracy and Katharine Hepburn. Ray's work in Pat and Mike led to his nomination, along with Richard Burton and Robert Wagner, for a Golden Globe as Best Newcomer. Burton won the award that year, but Ray's career was launched. He said after two films with Cukor: "I never needed direction again."

Ray said Spencer Tracy told him: "Kid, I don't know what it is that you got, and I got, and some of us have, but you can work in this business forever." "That," said Ray, "made me feel good, you know, coming from a guy like him. I never bowed down to anybody at Columbia or anywhere else, but my overall idea was, I'll do whatever they tell me because it's their business, not mine, and I've got to learn it."

=== Columbia leading man ===
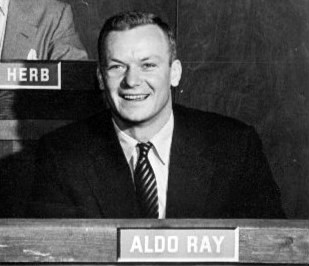
Ray on the DuMont TV program Twenty Questions, 1954

Columbia Pictures head Harry Cohn liked Ray and wanted him for the role of Private Robert Prewitt in From Here to Eternity (1953), but Fred Zinnemann insisted Montgomery Clift be cast. However, other good roles followed instead. "Because of Harry, all my first pictures were big hits, tremendously popular", Ray recalled.

Ray starred opposite Jane Wyman in Let's Do It Again (1953), then followed this acting opposite Rita Hayworth in Miss Sadie Thompson (also 1953), the third film version of the W. Somerset Maugham story "Rain". He also appeared in a production of Stalag 17 at La Jolla Playhouse.

Ray was loaned to Warner Bros to appear in Battle Cry (1955), which was directed by Raoul Walsh, who would become one of Ray's favorite directors. The film was a box-office hit—probably the most popular movie Ray ever made—although it led to his being typecast.

"In some ways the tough soldier role locked me in", reflected Ray later. "There were no sophisticated roles for me. I never seemed to get past master sergeant, though I always thought of myself as upper echelon."

=== Clash with Columbia ===
Ray was meant to appear in My Sister Eileen (1955) as The Wreck, but he walked off the set, claiming his role was too small, and had to be replaced by Dick York.

Battle Cry was a big hit at the box office, so Columbia gave Ray a lead role as a sergeant who marries a Japanese girl in Three Stripes in the Sun (originally The Gentle Wolfhound) (1955) and then loaned him to Paramount for We're No Angels (also 1955), in which he starred with Humphrey Bogart, Peter Ustinov, Basil Rathbone, Leo G. Carroll, and Joan Bennett.

Ray was profiled in Sight & Sound as follows:

Aldo Ray's technical advance in the four years since The Marrying Kind enables him now to work in subtler, more economical degree; there is an authoritative reserve and, still remarkably intact, the original rare lack of ostentation. All the same, his career seems to have become a nomadic drifting round the studios looking for the right kind of film. The good humour, the lenitive smile, the frog in the throat voice betray nothing of the disappointment the actor must feel after such exciting beginnings under Cukor's guidance.

Ray was meant to appear in Jubal but refused because Columbia had made a profit on his loan-outs for Battle Cry and We're No Angels but not paid Ray a bonus; Rod Steiger took the role instead. Ray was put on suspension.

Ray then refused to appear in Beyond Mombasa (1956) because he did not want to go on location. This led to his being replaced by Cornel Wilde and put under suspension again. However, the situation was resolved when he agreed to make Nightfall (1957), playing an artist who encounters a pair of ruthless bank robbers.

In 1956, in between appearances in Three Stripes In The Sun and Men in War, Ray worked in radio as a personality and announcer at hit music station WNDR in Syracuse, New York. A photo of Ray with a colleague in the WNDR studios, taken as part of a station promotional package, survives and can be found on a WNDR tribute website. By 1957, in any event, he had left WNDR and the radio business and returned to Hollywood.

On January 31, 1957, Ray appeared on NBC's The Ford Show Starring Tennessee Ernie Ford. He and Tennessee Ernie Ford did a comedy skit from a foxhole.

=== Two with Anthony Mann ===
Columbia loaned Ray out to Security Pictures (who released through United Artists) for him to appear in Men in War (1957) opposite Robert Ryan; it was directed by Anthony Mann, who became Ray's favorite director. Ray was given 5% of the profits, which he later estimated at $70,000.

Ray was reunited with Security Pictures, Ryan, and Mann to star in God's Little Acre (1958), an adaptation of Erskine Caldwell's controversial novel directed by Mann starring Robert Ryan and Tina Louise.

By the seventh year of his contract with Columbia, Ray was earning $750 a week. He later said for the first ten years of his career he made less than $100,000. He expressed interest in producing his own vehicle, The Magic Mesa, from a script by Burt Kennedy, but it was not made.

Instead Ray appeared in an adaptation of David Goodis's novel Nightfall (1957) directed by Jacques Tourneur and The Naked and the Dead (1958), an adaptation of Norman Mailer's novel directed by Raoul Walsh. It was produced by Paul Gregory, who said:

Aldo Ray was drunk the entire time. He was a very sweet guy, but he was gone. He drank drank drank. Raoul Walsh would say, "Let's get him in the morning 'cause in the afternoon it's over."... I just could not get used to it, actors who got all this money and then didn't behave professionally. The English actors have classical training. They perform like professionals. You take someone like Aldo Ray who was just picked up and catapulted into stardom, and then he was just a sponge for booze. He killed himself drinking, not living up to his moral contract.

Ray later admitted that producers were scared of casting him in projects because of his drinking.

=== Leaving Columbia ===
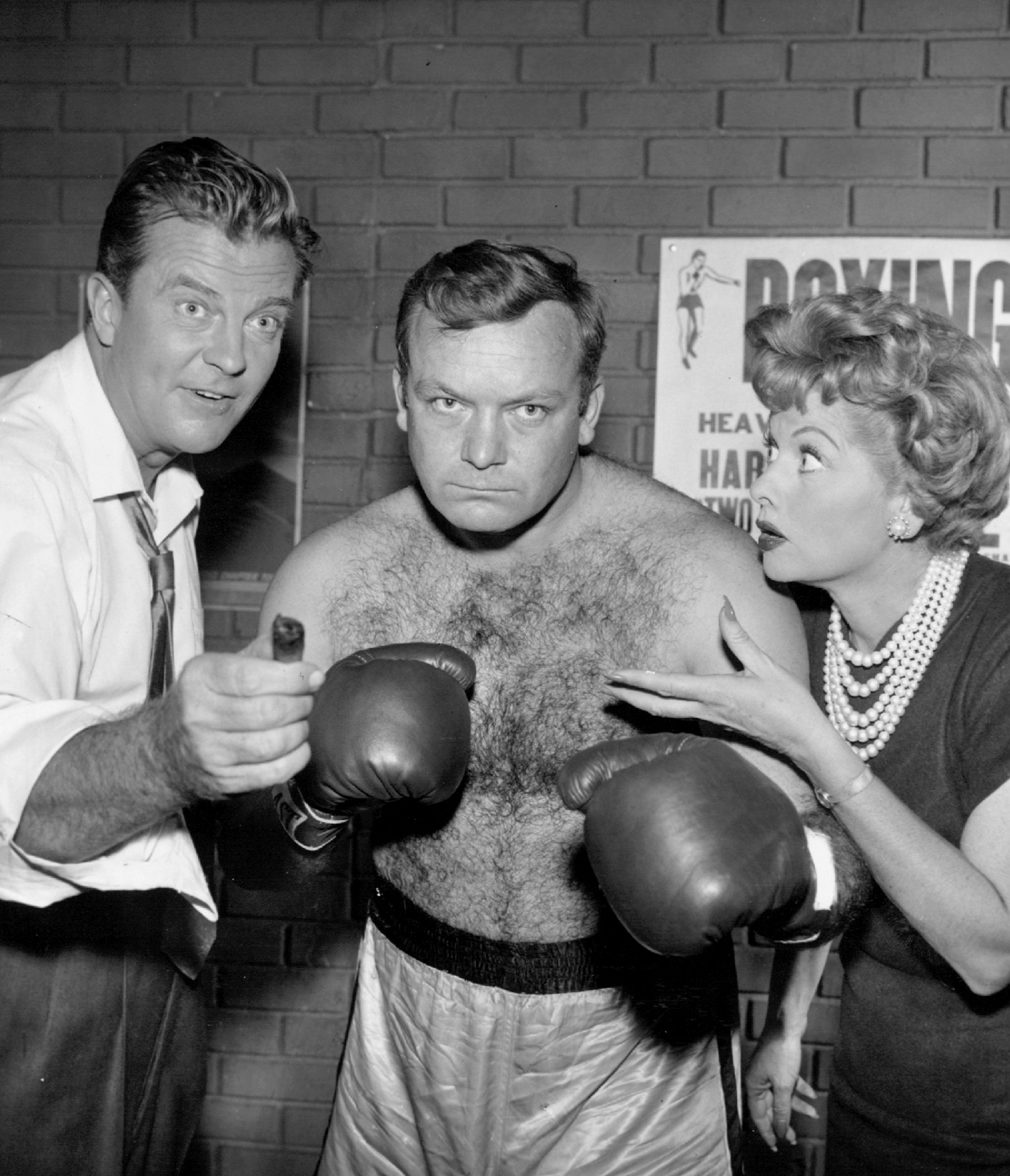
In an episode of Desilu Playhouse, "K.O. Kitty", L-R: William Lundigan, Aldo Ray, and Lucille Ball (1958).

Ray had been popular with Harry Cohn because, in the actor's words, "[h]e took no shit from anybody and he saw that I was that kind of a guy, too." But when Cohn died in 1958, Columbia elected not to renew Ray's contract and he decided to leave Hollywood. He later said, "I never was an expatriate. I spent some time in England and Spain and Italy but I was never out of this country [the US] longer than six months."

He starred in 1959 in Four Desperate Men (The Siege of Pinchgut), filmed in Australia; it was the last movie produced by Ealing Studios (releasing through MGM) and a box office disappointment. According to Filmink his casting "copped a lot of criticism, and it is odd to see him as an Australian resident, but he at least at looks like an ex con who might be willing to blow up a city. And being an American in Australia could have been made to work if they’d just bothered to explain it." Ray then appeared opposite Lucille Ball in an episode of Desilu Playhouse. He said he made more money from these two projects "than I'd made the whole eight years before."

In 1959, Ray was cast as Hunk Farber in the episode "Payment in Full" of the NBC western series Riverboat. In the story line, Farber betrays his friend and employer to collect reward money that he uses to court his girlfriend, Missy.

Ray made The Day They Robbed the Bank of England, directed by John Guillermin, in the UK and Johnny Nobody in Ireland. He later described his British sojourn as a "big mistake" because none of his British films were widely seen in America.

"Everything went well until the end of '62—then everything collapsed—including me", he later said. "I didn't take care of myself physically and mentally."

He hired a press agent, started taking better care of himself physically, and changed agents.

=== Return to Hollywood ===
Ray returned to Hollywood where he made a 1963 television pilot; Lollipop Louie aired as an episode of Alcoa Premiere. He had a small role in Sylvia (1965) and made a pilot for a TV series financed by producer Joseph E. Levine, Steptoe and Son (an unsuccessful adaptation of the British TV series). "I feel I shall have a complete regeneration of my career", he said in 1965.

In 1966 Ray co-starred in What Did You Do in the War, Daddy? (1966), Kill a Dragon, shot in Hong Kong, and Dead Heat on a Merry-Go-Round (1966) as well as playing "Jake", a deaf mute, in an episode of The Virginian entitled "Jacob was a Plain Man". He also made several guest appearances on television.

In the same year Ray claimed, "I've been turning down a lot of TV and B movies. I won't consider anything but important roles in important pictures." He said he was "almost independently wealthy", having saved and invested wisely in real estate from the times when his fee was $100,000 a film. He was interested in returning to politics but not until he had made "at least" four more movies. "The ideal situation would be three films every two years."

In 1967 he starred as a villain in Welcome to Hard Times and starred in Suicide Commando, shot in Rome and Spain in 1968.

He formed his own company, Crockett Productions, and bought two original scripts for films that were not made: Soldares, by Edwin Gottlieb, about the search for Pancho Villa, and Frogman, South Pacific, by William Zeck.

His best-known work of the 1960s was his portrayal of Sergeant Muldoon, alongside John Wayne, in The Green Berets (1968).

=== Career decline ===
As the 1960s ended, Hollywood's appetite for Ray's machismo started to wane. Though he worked steadily in the 1970s, the quality of his roles diminished, and he was typically cast as a gruff and gravelly redneck.

By 1976, Ray was broke. He blamed this on his ex-wives and red tape that meant he could not develop his real estate properties. "I lost it all", he said. "And I am very, very bitter about it... The biggest mistake I ever made was discovering women. I only wish society had been as free and easy when I was coming along as it is today because if that had been the case I wouldn't have been married. Three women in my life utterly destroyed me."

In 1979, Ray appeared in a pornographic movie, Sweet Savage, in a nonsexual role. He won Best Actor at the Adult Film Association's third Erotica Awards. Ray said later:

I wanted, I guess, to see what it was all about—a kind of half-assed adventure, you know? It was also a kind of vacation for me in a bad time—a nice location in Arizona—and I picked up a few thousand bucks. After it came out, a few people wagged their fingers at me—'Oh-ho-ho, you dirty dog'—but I knew I hadn't done anything wrong. They shot all the sex stuff after I'd flown back to L.A. I won the adult film Oscar for that, by the way, but somebody copped it.

In 1981, Ray told a newspaper that his drinking was "under control" and said, "I think things are going to shoot straight up. I'm working on a deal now and if the picture is made my worries... are over... If things go the way I anticipate and I stay healthy I think I've got better years ahead of me than behind me." He said he was open to a return to politics "if my movie career doesn't take off like I think it will." He admitted being unhappy with his career, saying: "I think I should have gotten more good stuff."

His career decline accelerated in the 1980s, and after being diagnosed with throat cancer in 1989, he accepted virtually any role that came his way to maintain his costly health insurance. He returned to Crockett in 1983.

Though at this stage in his career Ray starred mostly in low-budget and exploitation films, he did appear in occasional higher-profile works. He provided voice-over work as Sullivan for the 1982 animated film The Secret of NIMH alongside fellow character actor John Carradine. Ray was originally cast in the role of Gurney Halleck in David Lynch's 1984 film Dune, as his ex-wife Johanna Ray was the casting director, but was replaced by Patrick Stewart owing to ongoing issues with alcoholism.

During the last stages of his career, Ray made a number of films for Fred Olen Ray. "He'd give me $1,000 in cash, pay my expenses, and I'd do a day's work", said Ray. "Somebody showed me one of his cassettes—'starring Aldo Ray'—but it was just a one-day job... I needed money at the time, and Fred knew I needed a buck, so I did it. He exploited me, yeah... but I was ripe for it." He also appeared in two films for Iranian-born filmmaker Amir Shervan, better known for his cult classic Samurai Cop.

== Personal life ==
Ray was married three times:

- Shirley Green on June 20, 1947. They had one child, a daughter named Claire.
- Jeff Donnell (married September 30, 1954, divorced 1956)
- British actress Johanna Bennet (married March 26, 1960, divorced 1967), who continues to work today under the name Johanna Ray as a respected casting director. They had two sons, Paul and Eric. Johanna Ray, a longtime collaborator with David Lynch, cast her son with Aldo, Eric Da Re, in Lynch's Twin Peaks series as well as in the movie Twin Peaks: Fire Walk with Me.

== Later life ==
In 1986 Ray's SAG membership was revoked when it was discovered he was acting in a non-union production, Lethal Injection. However, Ray still got his union pension and benefits. His fee at this stage was $5,000 a week. He appeared in two more higher-profile films, Michael Cimino's The Sicilian (1987) and Blood Red (1989), both in supporting roles that emphasized his Italian heritage.

In 1989, he was diagnosed with a malignant tumor in his throat that Ray attributed to excessive smoking and drinking.

His last film, which was filmed in mid 1990, was Shock 'Em Dead, in which he appeared with Traci Lords and Troy Donahue. In an interview that same year, he said about his cancer:

I regret that I don't have more control of my tongue and thoughts—because I speak too frankly and too honestly, and this world is not meant for frank and honest people. They don't mix. Reality is pretty phony... I'm in great shape—got all my energy and strength back. I had surgery on my neck last March, and after one more session of the chemo—that's 50 more hours—the doctors say I'll have it all beat... I'm not scared of dying—it's how I die that matters. I'd rather live one good year than ten more crappy years. And I think I've got some good pictures ahead of me if I can find the right roles. There's plenty of good stuff left in me, you know?

== Death ==
In his final years, Ray remained in Crockett with his mother and other family and friends. On February 19, 1991, he was admitted to the Veterans Administration Hospital in Martinez, 40 miles east of San Francisco. He died there of complications from throat cancer and pneumonia on March 27, 1991, at age 64. He was cremated and his ashes were put in an urn and buried in Crockett, with a majority of the residents coming out to pay their respects.

== Legacy ==
Author Richard Matheson said that his best-known work, The Incredible Shrinking Man, was inspired by a scene in Aldo Ray's Let's Do It Again in which a character puts on someone else's hat and it sinks down past his ears; "I thought, what if a man put on his own hat and that happened?" he recounted in an interview for Stephen King's nonfiction work Danse Macabre.

Quentin Tarantino says Aldo Ray would have been ideal casting for the character of Butch in Pulp Fiction (1994) and that the look of Butch in the film (as played by Bruce Willis) was inspired by Ray.

Brad Pitt's character in Tarantino's 2009 war film Inglourious Basterds is a soldier named "Aldo Raine", in tribute to Ray.

Ray appears as a character in Tarantino's 2021 novel Once Upon a Time in Hollywood.

The Crockett Museum has a display depicting his life.

A profile in Movie Morlocks analysed Ray's appeal from the film Nightfall:

Nobody smokes a cigarette like Aldo Ray. There's no forethought involved. No effort to seduce or impress audiences with an exaggerated pose or gesture. Ray doesn't have to pretend to be cool, threatening, bruised, battered or tough. He just is. And I find every unassuming gesture he makes utterly captivating. Aldo Ray has never been considered a great Hollywood actor in the traditional sense but his natural, unaffected performances often seemed to emerge from some unsettled place. You could frequently hear a genuine urgency in the way he delivered his lines and his casual swagger told you he'd been around the block more than once. Whenever Ray erupted on screen it felt like you were watching a volcano explode and if you didn't get out of the way it could easily swallow you up in a heavy flow of golden molten lava. Film historians often like to talk about the sea change that occurred in the 1950s, when actor's [sic] like Montgomery Clift and Marlon Brando brought a new kind of sincerity to Hollywood. These highly trained method actors changed the way we appreciate and understand acting today and they've rightfully been recognized for their accomplishments. But there were other performers that unconsciously championed a new kind of natural approach to acting. And one of them was Aldo Ray.

== Filmography ==
- My True Story (1951) as Mark Foster (as Aldo DaRe)
- Never Trust a Gambler (1951) as State Trooper (uncredited)
- Saturday's Hero (1951) as Gene Hausler (as Aldo DaRe)
- The Barefoot Mailman (1951) as Theron Henchman (uncredited)
- The Marrying Kind (1952) as Chet Keefer
- Pat and Mike (1952) as Davie Hucko
- Let's Do It Again (1953) as Frank McGraw
- Miss Sadie Thompson (1953) as Sgt. Phil O'Hara
- Battle Cry (1955) as Pvt. / Pfc Andy Hookens
- Lux Video Theatre (1955, TV Series, episode "Intermission Guest") as Intermission Guest
- We're No Angels (1955) as Albert
- Three Stripes in the Sun (1955) as MSgt. Hugh O'Reilly
- Nightfall (1957) as James Vanning
- Men in War (1957) as Montana
- The Naked and the Dead (1958) as Sgt. Sam Croft
- God's Little Acre (1958) as Will Thompson
- Westinghouse Desilu Playhouse (1958, TV Series, episode "KO Kitty") as Harold Tibbetts
- Four Desperate Men (1959) (aka Siege of Pinchgut) as Matt Kirk
- Riverboat (1959, TV Series, episode "Payment in Full") as Hunk Farber
- The Day They Robbed the Bank of England (1960) as Charles Norgate
- Johnny Nobody (1961) as Johnny Nobody
- Frontier Circus (1961, TV Series, episode "Depths of Fear") as Toby Mills
- The Virginian (1962, TV Series, episode "Big Day Great Day") as Frank Krause
- Naked City (1962, TV Series, episode "Idylls of a Running Back") as Elvin Rhodes
- Musketeers of the Sea (1962) as Moreau
- Alcoa Premiere (1963, TV Series, episode "Lollipop Louie") as Louis Mastroanni
- Ben Casey (1963, TV Series, episode "Little Drops of Water, Little Grains of Sand") as Frank Alusik
- Kraft Suspense Theatre (1964, TV Series, episode "The Deep End") as Sam Kimber
- Burke's Law (1964, TV Series, episode "Who Killed Andy Zygmut?") as Mister Harold
- Bob Hope Presents the Chrysler Theatre (1964, TV Series, episode "Have Girls, Will Travel") as Moose
- Bonanza (1964, TV series, episode "The Wild One") as Leif Jessup
- Nightmare in the Sun (1964) as Sheriff
- Sylvia (1965) as Jonas Karoki
- Daniel Boone (1965, TV Series, episode "The Trek") as Benton
- What Did You Do in the War, Daddy? (1966) as Sgt. Rizzo
- Dead Heat on a Merry-Go-Round (1966) as Eddie Hart
- The Virginian (1966, TV Series, episode "Jacob was a Plain Man") as Jacob 'Jake' Walker
- Run for Your Life (1967, TV Series, episode "The Face of the Antagonist") as Vince Murdock
- Riot on Sunset Strip (1967) as Walt Lorimer
- Welcome to Hard Times (1967) as Man from Bodie
- The Violent Ones (1967) as Joe Vorzyck
- The Danny Thomas Hour (1967, TV Series, episode "Fame is a Four Letter Word") as Georgie Cutler
- Kill a Dragon (1967) as Vigo
- The Power (1968) as Bruce
- The Green Berets (1968) as Sgt. Muldoon
- Suicide Commandos (1968) as Sergeant Cloadec
- A Torn Page of Glory (1968) as Major Comack
- The Outsider (1969, TV Series, episode "The Old School Tie") as Eddie Wolfe
- The Bold Ones: The Protectors (1969, TV Series, episode "Deadlock") as Edward Logan
- Love, American Style (1969, TV Series, episode "Love and the Advice-Givers") as Herb (segment "Love and the Advice-Givers")
- Angel Unchained (1970) as Sheriff
- The Houndcats (1972, TV Series) as Mussel Mutt (voice)
- And Hope to Die (1972) as Mattone
- Bonanza (1972, TV Series, episode "Riot") as Heiser
- The Bad Bunch (1973) as Lt. Stans
- Dynamite Brothers (East Meets Watts) (1974) as Burke
- The Centerfold Girls (1974) as Ed Walker
- Movin' On (1974, TV Series, episode "The Trick is to Stay Alive) as Art
- Police Story (1974, episode "Love, Mabel") as Capt. Eagle
- Gone with the West (1974) as Mimmo, Stage Robber
- Seven Alone (1974) as Dr. Dutch
- Paesano: A Voice in the Night (1975) as J. Arthur Cobra
- Promise Him Anything (1975, TV Movie) as Cop
- The Man Who Wouldn't Die (1975) as Frank Keefer
- S.W.A.T. (1975, TV Series, episode "The Vendetta") as Ralph Costas
- Inside Out (1975) as M.Sgt. Prior
- Marcus Welby, M.D. (1975, TV Series, episode "The Tidal Wave") as Joe Gavanelli
- Psychic Killer (1975) as Lt. Dave Anderson
- Won Ton Ton, the Dog Who Saved Hollywood (1976) as Stubby Stebbins
- Haunts (1976) as Sheriff Peterson
- The Quest (1976, TV Series, episode "Seventy Two Hours") as Chippy
- Black Samurai (1977) as D.R.A.G.O.N. chief (uncredited)
- Haunted (1977) as Andrew
- Mission to Glory: A True Story (1977) as Mine Boss
- The Lucifer Complex (1978) as Karl Krauss
- Death Dimension (1978) as Verde
- Women in White (1979, TV Movie) as Frederick Thaler
- Don't Go Near the Park (1979) as Taft
- Bog (1979) as Sheriff Neal Rydholm
- Sweet Savage (1979) as Banner
- The Glove (1979) as Tiny
- Human Experiments (1979) as Mat Tibbs
- CHiPs (1979) (TV series) as Karl Beasley
- The Great Skycopter Rescue (1980) as Sheriff Burgess
- When I Am King (1981) as The Manager
- The Secret of NIMH (1982) as Sullivan (voice)
- Mongrel (1982) as Bouchard
- Boxoffice (1982) as Lew
- Smokey and the Judge (1982)
- Dark Sanity (1982) as Larry Craig
- To Kill a Stranger (1983) as Inspector Benedict
- Vultures (1984) as Wally
- Frankenstein's Great Aunt Tillie (1984) as Bürgermeister
- The Executioner, Part II (1984) as Police Commissioner
- Flesh and Bullets (1985) as Lieutenant in Police Department
- Biohazard (1985) as General Randolph
- Evils of the Night (1985) as Fred
- Falcon Crest (1985, TV Series) as Phil McLish
- Frankenstein's Brain (1985, Short)
- Prison Ship (1986) as The Inquistor
- Hollywood Cop (1987) as Mr. Fong
- The Sicilian (1987) as Don Siano of Bisacquino
- Terror on Alcatraz (1987) as Frank Morris
- Hateman (1987) as Sheriff Benny
- Drug Runners (1988) as Victor Lazzaro
- Blood Red (1989) as Father Stassio
- Night Shadow (1989) as Gene Krebelski
- Terror Night (1989) as Captain Ned
- Young Rebels (1989) as Sheriff
- Shooters (1989) as General Makepeace
- Crime of Crimes (1989) as Karl Johnson
- Shock 'Em Dead (1991) as Tony
