= Wild Gals of the Naked West =

1962 film

- Film poster
- Directed by: Russ Meyer
- Screenplay by: Russ Meyer; Jack Moran
- Produced by: Peter A. DeCenzie
- Starring: Sammy Gilbert; Anthony-James Ryan; Jackie Moran; Terri Taylor; Frank Bolger; Werner Kirsch
- Cinematography: Russ Meyer
- Edited by: Russ Meyer
- Music by: Marlin Skiles
- Production companies: Pacifica Films; Pad-Ram Enterprises
- Release date: May 9, 1962
- Running time: 65 minutes
- Country: United States
- Language: English

Wild Gals of the Naked West is a 1962 nudie-cutie Western film written and directed by Russ Meyer and starring Sammy Gilbert, Anthony-James Ryan, Jackie Moran, Terri Taylor, Frank Bolger, and Werner Kirsch. The film is one of the few porn flicks in the American Western movie genre.

== Plot ==
An old geezer recalls some of the antics of the men and women of his western town, more wild and woolly than Tombstone or Dodge City. In this town no one is a good shot, the women are hungry for new meat, and practical jokers abound. A stranger strolls into town, proving resistant to the mayhem, and after donning some cowboy duds begins cleaning up that town.

== Cast ==
- Sammy Gilbert as The Stranger
- Anthony-James Ryan as Crazy Redskin
- Jackie Moran
- Terri Taylor as Golden Nuggets
- Frank Bolger as Snake Wolf
- Werner Kirsch as Snick
- Julie Williams as The Bosom

== Reception ==
According to Roger Ebert, the film was "an ambitious attempt at comedy and satire. It is one of Meyer's personal favorites, but did badly at the box-office because, he now believes, he paid too much attention to the humor and not enough to the sex, and was over-cautious in assigning pasties to his actresses."

== See also ==
- List of American films of 1962
