= Die Hard (franchise) =

American action film series

- Official film series logo
- Created by: Roderick Thorp
- Original work: Nothing Lasts Forever (1979)
- Owner: 20th Century Studios
- Years: from 1988

Print publications
- Novels: The Detective (1966); Nothing Lasts Forever (1979); 58 Minutes (1987)
- Comics: Die Hard: Year One; A Die Hard Christmas; A Million Ways to Die Hard

Films and television
- Films: Die Hard (1988); Die Hard 2 (1990); Die Hard with a Vengeance (1995); Live Free or Die Hard (2007); A Good Day to Die Hard (2013)
- Short film: DieHard is Back (2020 commercial)

Games
- Video games: Die Hard (1990); Die Hard Arcade (1996); Die Hard Trilogy (1996); Die Hard Trilogy 2: Viva Las Vegas (2000); Die Hard: Nakatomi Plaza (2002); Die Hard: Vendetta (2002)

Audio
- Soundtracks: Die Hard; Die Hard 2; Die Hard with a Vengeance; Live Free or Die Hard; A Good Day to Die Hard

Miscellaneous
- Articles: A Farewell to Arms

Die Hard is an American action film series and media franchise that originated with Roderick Thorp's 1979 novel Nothing Lasts Forever. All five films revolve around the main character of John McClane (Joe Leland in the original novel), a police detective who continually finds himself in the middle of a crisis where he is both the only hope against disaster and the culprit's target.

Per the franchise's name, McClane confounds repeated attempts to kill him, driving his enemies to distraction, by adding up and exploiting dumb luck. The films have grossed a combined $1.4 billion (nominal) worldwide, with Bruce Willis as the only actor to appear in all five films.

== Films ==
| Film | U.S. release date | Director(s) | Screenwriter(s) | Story by | Producer(s) |
|---|---|---|---|---|---|
| Die Hard | July 15, 1988 | John McTiernan | Jeb Stuart and Steven E. de Souza | Jeb Stuart and Steven E. de Souza | Lawrence Gordon and Joel Silver |
| Die Hard 2 | July 4, 1990 | Renny Harlin | Steven E. de Souza and Doug Richardson | Steven E. de Souza and Doug Richardson | Charles Gordon, Lawrence Gordon and Joel Silver |
| Die Hard with a Vengeance | May 19, 1995 | John McTiernan | Jonathan Hensleigh | Jonathan Hensleigh | John McTiernan and Michael Tadross |
| Live Free or Die Hard | June 27, 2007 | Len Wiseman | Mark Bomback | Mark Bomback and David Marconi | Michael Fottrell |
| A Good Day to Die Hard | February 14, 2013 | John Moore | Skip Woods | Skip Woods | Alex Young and Wyck Godfrey |

=== Die Hard (1988) ===
The first film takes place in Los Angeles at the fictional Nakatomi Plaza (portrayed by Fox Plaza). It begins on Christmas Eve when McClane (Bruce Willis) comes to reunite with separated wife Holly (Bonnie Bedelia) in Los Angeles at her company's Christmas party. Holly, who now has her own career, lives with their two children and uses her maiden name.

At Nakatomi Plaza, West German terrorists break in and take the celebrants hostage. McClane escapes detection and hides throughout the building. He kills off the gang and learns their real plan, to steal $640 million in bearer bonds from the building's vault. In the finale, McClane shoots the terrorist leader, Hans Gruber (Alan Rickman), out of the window to fall thirty stories.

It was released on July 15, 1988, to positive reviews and grossed $140.8 million worldwide.

=== Die Hard 2 (1990) ===
The second film takes place two years after the first, again on Christmas Eve of 1990. In Washington, D.C., McClane waits for his wife at Washington Dulles International Airport. Mercenaries led by former U.S. Army Special Forces Colonel Stuart (William Sadler) take over the airport communication systems, stranding planes in the air, including the one with McClane's wife. Colonel Stuart wants to free a captured Latin American dictator (Franco Nero) en route to the airport. McClane discovers the plan, including a conspiracy between Stuart and an Army counter-terrorist unit sent to stop him. He foils their plans and provides a visual landing signal for the circling aircraft by exploding the villains' getaway plane.

It was released on July 4, 1990, to positive reviews and grossed $240 million worldwide.

=== Die Hard with a Vengeance (1995) ===
In the third film, McClane, now a police lieutenant, is back in New York City, separated from his wife, suspended from the police force, and a borderline alcoholic. A terrorist known only as "Simon" (Jeremy Irons) threatens to blow up various locations in the city unless McClane will play his twisted version of Simon Says, riddles and challenges.

Zeus Carver (Samuel L. Jackson), a shopkeeper from Harlem, saves McClane after the first challenge, and reluctantly continues to help. The FBI reveals that Simon is the brother of Hans Gruber, killed in the first film. McClane learns revenge is a cover story for robbing the New York Federal Reserve. McClane tracks Simon to the Canada–US border. McClane kills Simon by shooting at a power line above Simon's helicopter.

It was released on May 19, 1995, to mixed reviews and grossed $366.1 million worldwide.

=== Live Free or Die Hard (2007) ===
The fourth film, which was released as Die Hard 4.0 outside North America, takes place on Independence Day, over a decade after Die Hard with a Vengeance. McClane is well-known, divorced, and estranged from his daughter Lucy (Mary Elizabeth Winstead). Cyber-terrorists hack into computers at the FBI, who had sent McClane to bring in computer hacker Matthew "Matt" Farrell (Justin Long) for questioning. Assassins hired by terrorist mastermind Thomas Gabriel (Timothy Olyphant) attempt to kill McClane and Farrell. Farrell tells McClane that the terrorists are actually in the middle of a "fire sale"—a crippling cyber-warfare attack on the national infrastructure: power, public utilities, traffic, and other computer-controlled systems. Although the terrorists capture Lucy and Farrell, McClane foils the criminals and saves the hostages.

It was released June 27, 2007, to positive reviews and grossed $383.5 million worldwide.

=== A Good Day to Die Hard (2013) ===
The fifth film is set a few years later, mostly in Moscow, Russia and the Chernobyl Exclusion Zone, Ukraine. McClane finds out that his estranged son John "Jack" McClane, Jr. (Jai Courtney) was arrested in Moscow for murder. When he arrives at the Moscow courthouse for Jack, Russian terrorists bomb the building and Jack escapes with imprisoned ex-billionaire Yuri Komarov (Sebastian Koch). In an intense car chase, McClane pursues and saves the pair. Jack, unhappy at the unexpected arrival, reluctantly picks up his father. When they stop at a CIA safe house in Moscow, McClane learns Jack is a deep-cover CIA operative trying to get close to Komarov for his file that incriminates corrupt, high-ranking Russian official Viktor Chagarin (Sergei Kolesnikov). Chagarin's henchmen, led by his main enforcer Alik (Radivoje Bukvic), attack the safe house. McClane holds them off, and escapes with Jack and Komarov. They retrieve a key for the file in Chernobyl, and meet Komarov's daughter Irina (Yuliya Snigir). Irina betrays them to Alik. The McClanes escape, without Komarov. Irina, always on the side of her father Komarov, tries to save him. McClane goes after Irina, while Jack chases her father. Jack throws Komarov off of the roof, and he falls on the rotors of the helicopter and is eviscerated.

It was released on February 14, 2013, to negative reviews and grossed $304.7 million worldwide.

=== Cancelled sixth film ===
When the production was formally announced for the fifth film in the series, Bruce Willis expressed his desire to retire the John McClane character in a sixth and final film, explicitly calling for a 'fleshed out' conclusion.

In 2013, Fox Studios began looking into developing the next installment. The studio took story pitches for a so-called "Die Hardest", including those from the public, at least one of which would have brought the action to Japan. A crossover with popular television program, 24, with Die Hard characters had been previously considered, but contract negotiations with Kiefer Sutherland soured and no pilot was made. Instead, Die Hard was re-formulated as a gaiden (side story) featuring Jack Bauer called "Die Hard 24/7". It was optioned and became A Good Day to Die Hard. The studio then chose to reincarnate 24 in limited edition as 24: Live Another Day (a homage to Live Free or Die Hard), which premiered in May 2014 and ended that July. By 2015, Live Free or Die Hard director Len Wiseman's self-penned prequel/sequel origin story idea called John McClane gained traction.

Writer Evan Katz pitched a follow-up to Live Another Day called 24: Legacy that was greenlit in 2015. The show aired from February through April 2017 and was soon cancelled (not renewed) in June. Following this model, a deal had been made with Lorenzo di Bonaventura to produce another, similar television programme that revolved around the concept of real-time narration, but for twelve hours instead of twenty-four since Die Hard stories happen over that time frame, saying: "We want you to get invested in John McClane more than ever before". That summer, Wiseman was in negotiations to direct a standalone mini-series (12 episodes) tentatively titled, "DIE HARD: Year One", based around the BOOM! Studios graphic novel of the same name. Its plot - rumored to borrow heavily from said comic book issues - follows John McClane as a beat cop in New York City early in his career as narrated by Bruce Willis in the present-day. Wiseman publicly floated that he was casting for a young version of John McClane in September. Six months later, the studio enlisted duo Chad Hayes and Carey W. Hayes to re-write the screenplay after Bruce Willis refused to endorse the previous edition and its actor.

In July 2018, di Bonaventura submitted an updated treatment titled McClane, further confirming that the storyline was similar in stature to The Godfather Part 2: featuring elements of McClane's and Holly's characters in the 1970s, intermixed with their present-day counterparts. The following month, Wiseman said that pre-production on the new film should start "...fairly soon, no dates" once the script has been completed. Tobey Maguire (son in-law of then-NBCUniversal Chairman Ronald Meyer) joined the production team in late Summer. By December, di Bonaventura handed in yet another draft, this time without input from Willis. Production designer Carol Uraneck, who was hired that September, later left the project by the close of the year. Between February and April 2019, the production team made revisions to the writing, but insinuated that the project, though supposedly moving forward, was on the studio's backburner. It has been hinted that Samuel L. Jackson could reprise his role as Zeus. Actress Mary Elizabeth Winstead said that she was interested in returning as Lucy Gennero-McClane, but later intimated doubt that, due to scheduling, the film would ever get made.

The acquisition of 20th Century Fox by Disney resulted in a production hiatus in August 2019. Wiseman was then dealt to Lionsgate to direct pictures in the John Wick franchise. di Bonaventura stated in a July 2021 interview that the McClane project is "not happening" as a further consequence. Die Hard was removed from the Fox imprint indefinitely. In lieu of companies-wide reorganization, the media giants (Disney, Comcast) are said to be rebooting the property for streaming on Hulu or Netflix.

Willis had taken roles that featured the "Die Hard scenario" or implied its namefellow in a number of direct-to-video films since the release of A Good Day to Die Hard. After confirmation of the potential sixth Die Hard film's cancellation and the wrap of production on the film Detective Knight: Rogue, Willis' family announced that he had been diagnosed with aphasia and paused his career. In July 2022, he was videographed on the lot at Fox headquarters, the very same location of the set of Die Hard, to mark the film's anniversary. This footage was shared by his wife Emma Heming Willis on social media. By February 2023, Willis was diagnosed with frontotemporal dementia and his family announced his retirement from acting, ruling out any future return as McClane.

== Cast and crew ==
=== Cast ===
List indicators

This section includes characters who have appeared in three or more films in the series.

- An empty grey cell indicates the character was not in the film.
- ^{A} indicates an appearance through archival footage or audio.
- ^{C} indicates a cameo role.
- ^{P} indicates an appearance in onscreen photographs.
- ^{U} indicates an uncredited appearance.
- ^{V} indicates a voice-only role.

| Character | Films | | | | | Commercial |
| Character | Die Hard | Die Hard 2 | Die Hard with a Vengeance | Live Free or Die Hard | A Good Day to Die Hard | DieHard is Back |
|---|---|---|---|---|---|---|
| Character | 1988 | 1990 | 1995 | 2007 | 2013 | 2020 |
| John McClane | Bruce Willis | Bruce Willis | Bruce Willis | Bruce Willis | Bruce Willis | Bruce Willis |
| Holly Gennaro-McClane | Bonnie Bedelia | Bonnie Bedelia | Bonnie Bedelia^{C}^{U}^{V} | Bonnie Bedelia^{P} | Mentioned | |
| Al Powell | Reginald VelJohnson | Reginald VelJohnson | | | | |
| Richard Thornburg | William Atherton | William Atherton | | | | |
| Lucy McClane | Taylor Fry | | | Mary Elizabeth Winstead | Mary Elizabeth Winstead | |
| John "Jack" McClane, Jr. | Noah Land | | | | Jai Courtney | |
| Argyle | De'voreaux White | | | | | De'voreaux White |
| Theo | Clarence Gilyard Jr. | | | | | Clarence Gilyard Jr. |
| Hans Gruber | Alan Rickman | | Alan Rickman^{A} | | | |
| Karl Vreski | Alexander Godunov | | | | | |
| Harry Ellis | Hart Bochner | | | | | |
| Deputy Dwayne Robinson | Paul Gleason | | | | | |
| Col. William Stuart | | William Sadler | | | | |
| Captain Lorenzo | | Dennis Franz | | | | |
| Major Grant | | John Amos | | | | |
| General Esperanza | | Franco Nero | | | | |
| Leslie Barnes | | Art Evans | | | | |
| Trudeau | | Fred Thompson | | | | |
| Marvin | | Tom Bower | | | | |
| Zeus Carver | | | Samuel L. Jackson | | | |
| Simon Gruber | | | Jeremy Irons | | | |
| Walter Cobb | | | Larry Bryggman | | | |
| Joe Lambert | | | Graham Greene | | | |
| Connie Kowalski | | | Colleen Camp | | | |
| Mathias Targo | | | Nick Wyman | | | |
| Katya | | | Sam Phillips | | | |
| Matthew "Matt" Farrell | | | | Justin Long | | |
| Thomas Gabriel | | | | Timothy Olyphant | | |
| Frederick 'Warlock' Kaludis | | | | Kevin Smith | | |
| Miguel Bowman | | | | Cliff Curtis | | |
| Mai Linh | | | | Maggie Q | | |
| Trey | | | | Jonathan Sadowski | | |
| Yuri Komarov | | | | | Sebastian Koch | |
| Irina Komarov | | | | | Yuliya Snigir | |
| Alik | | | | | Radivoje Bukvic | |
| Mike Collins | | | | | Cole Hauser | |
| Viktor Chagarin | | | | | Sergei Kolesnikov | |
| Murphy | | | | | Amaury Nolasco | |

=== Crew ===
| Crew/detail | Film | | | | |
| Crew/detail | Die Hard | Die Hard 2 | Die Hard with a Vengeance | Live Free or Die Hard | A Good Day to Die Hard |
|---|---|---|---|---|---|
| Director | John McTiernan | Renny Harlin | John McTiernan | Len Wiseman | John Moore |
| Composer | Michael Kamen | Michael Kamen | Michael Kamen | Marco Beltrami | Marco Beltrami |
| Cinematographer | Jan de Bont | Oliver Wood | Peter Menzies, Jr. | Simon Duggan | Jonathan Sela |
| Editor(s) | Frank J. Urioste; John F. Link | Robert A. Ferretti; Stuart Baird | John Wright | Nicholas Del Toh | Dan Zimmerman |
| Production Companies | Silver Pictures; Gordon Company | Silver Pictures; Gordon Company | Cinergi Pictures | Dune Entertainment; Cheyenne Enterprises; Ingenious Film Partners | Giant Pictures |
| Distributor | 20th Century Fox | | | | |
| Release date | July 15, 1988 | July 4, 1990 | May 19, 1995 | June 27, 2007 | February 14, 2013 |
| Running time | 132 minutes | 124 minutes | 128 minutes | 129 minutes | 97 minutes |

== Production ==
=== Source material ===
Die Hard is adapted from the 1979 novel Nothing Lasts Forever by Roderick Thorp.

Die Hard 2 was adapted from the 1987 novel 58 Minutes by Walter Wager.

Die Hard with a Vengeance was adapted from a script called Simon Says by Jonathan Hensleigh, which was also briefly considered to become the script for Lethal Weapon 4. The hook in Hensleigh's screenplay that captured the attention of director John McTiernan was the idea of a man being targeted for revenge by someone whose life he had unwittingly destroyed. Once the Simon character became the brother of Hans Gruber and the backstory was established, the project fully came together. It was novelized by Deborah Chiel.

Live Free or Die Hard was based on the 1997 article "A Farewell to Arms" written for Wired magazine by John Carlin. It also drew on a script 20th Century Fox owned called "WW3.com", which dealt with a massive cyberterrorism attack against the U.S. and which was nearly put into production in 2001 but ultimately abandoned because several elements in the story too closely resembled the September 11 attacks.

A Good Day to Die Hard was the only film in the series to come from an original screenplay, and not be based upon any prior works. The original screenplay was penned by Skip Woods.

== Reception ==
=== Box office performance ===
| Film | Release date | Box office gross | | | Box office ranking | | Budget | Ref(s) |
| Film | Release date | North America | Other territories | Worldwide | All time North America | All time worldwide | Budget | Ref(s) |
|---|---|---|---|---|---|---|---|---|
| Die Hard | July 15, 1988 | $83,844,093 | $57,759,104 | $141,603,197 | #734 | —N/a | $28,000,000 | |
| Die Hard 2 | July 4, 1990 | $117,540,947 | $122,490,347 | $240,031,274 | #446 | #445 | $62–70,000,000 | |
| Die Hard with a Vengeance | May 19, 1995 | $100,012,499 | $266,089,167 | $366,101,666 | #596 | #223 | $90,000,000 | |
| Live Free or Die Hard | June 27, 2007 | $134,529,403 | $253,626,608 | $388,156,011 | #336 | #201 | $110,000,000 | |
| A Good Day to Die Hard | February 14, 2013 | $67,349,198 | $237,304,984 | $304,654,182 | #977 | #314 | $92,000,000 | |
| Total | | $503,276,140 | $937,270,210 | $1,440,546,330 | | | $382,000,000–390,000,000 | |

=== Critical and public response ===
Although the first Die Hard has been credited as one of the greatest action movies of all time, critical reaction to its sequels has varied.

The original Die Hard received substantial praise. Pete Croatto of FilmCritic.com called the film "a perfect action movie in every detail, the kind of movie that makes your summer memorable". James Berardinelli wrote that the film "represents the class of modern action pictures and the standard by which they must be judged". Critic Desson Howe wrote that "Willis has found the perfect vehicle to careen wildly onto the crowded L.A. freeway of Lethal Weapons and Beverly Hills Cops". Willis was also called "perfect as the wisecracking John McClane" and "an excellent casting choice as a sardonic action hero". Alan Rickman's portrayal of villain Hans Gruber was described as "marvelous" and "a career-making performance". Gruber also ranked 46 on the villain side of AFI's 100 Years...100 Heroes and Villains. In 2007, Entertainment Weekly ranked Die Hard the greatest action film of all time.

The first sequel, Die Hard 2, received positive reviews, although not as many as the original. Despite only giving the original film two stars, critic Roger Ebert gave this film three and a half stars and called it "terrific entertainment". James Berardinelli called the film "somewhat-muddled but still entertaining". Peter Travers wrote that "however impressively made, Die Hard 2 begins to wear thin".

The third film, Die Hard with a Vengeance, initially received mixed reviews. Owen Gleiberman of Entertainment Weekly stated that while "McTiernan stages individual sequences with great finesse... they don't add up to a taut, dread-ridden whole". James Berardinelli thought that the explosions and fights were "filmed with consummate skill, and were thrilling in their own right". Samuel L. Jackson also received praise for his role in the film. Desson Howe of The Washington Post thought that "the best thing about the movie was the relationship between McClane and Zeus", saying that Jackson was "almost as good as he was in Pulp Fiction". Retrospective reviews have been more positive, with many considering it the best sequel in the franchise. (Note: Attributed to multiple references:) Empire considered it to be one of the 50 greatest film sequels in 2009. Ben Sherlock of Screen Rant regarded it as the best sequel of the franchise. Johnny Hoffman from MovieWeb considered it a step up from the previous film and praised Willis and Jackson's chemistry and the action scenes.

The fourth film, Live Free or Die Hard, received mostly positive reviews. Mick LaSalle of the San Francisco Chronicle claimed that the film "is the best in the series, an invigorating return to the style of blockbuster that dominated summers back in the early 1990s". USA Today film critic Claudia Puig said that the film "delivers when it comes to kick-butt, action-packed mayhem", but "as a convincing techno-thriller, it doesn't really work".

The fifth film, A Good Day to Die Hard, received mostly negative reviews from critics. Critics lambasted the installment for "[entering] generic action movie territory", as written by reviewer James Bernardinelli, with a "cliched [and] uninspired script". Peter Rainer of the Christian Science Monitor wrote that "John's appeal was always his ordinariness, but director John Moore has him surviving more explosions than Wile E. Coyote, and with hardly a scratch". A. O. Scott of The New York Times also commented that the series has taken a downfall with the film: "Everything that made the first "Die Hard" memorable—the nuances of character, the political subtext, the cowboy wit—has been dumbed down or scrubbed away entirely". Willis has however, been cited as the film's redeeming quality, with Chris Vognar of the Dallas Morning News saying that "Willis' presence at least provides undercurrents of easy jocularity".

In CinemaScore polls conducted during the opening weekend, movie audiences gave the series the grades listed below on an A+ to F scale.

| Film | Rotten Tomatoes | Metacritic | CinemaScore |
|---|---|---|---|
| Die Hard | 94% (89 reviews) | 72 (14 reviews) | A+ |
| Die Hard 2 | 69% (68 reviews) | 67 (17 reviews) | A |
| Die Hard with a Vengeance | 60% (80 reviews) | 58 (19 reviews) | A− |
| Live Free or Die Hard | 82% (210 reviews) | 69 (34 reviews) | A− |
| A Good Day to Die Hard | 15% (231 reviews) | 28 (41 reviews) | B+ |

== Other media ==
=== Comics ===
==== Die Hard: Year One ====
BOOM! Studios published an ongoing Die Hard comic series that serves as a prequel to the first film, titled Die Hard: Year One. Its story is set in 1976 and follows John McClane as a rookie cop in the NYPD, and is scripted by Howard Chaykin. The first issue of Die Hard: Year One was released on September 30, 2009. Eight issues have been released, with the eighth released on April 12, 2010.

The official description read:

Every great action hero got started somewhere. Batman Begins. Bond had his Casino Royale. And for John McClane, more than a decade before the first Die Hard movie, he's just another rookie cop, an East Coast guy working on earning his badge in New York City during 1976s Bicentennial celebration... and the Summer of Sam. Too bad for John McClane, nothing's ever that easy.

==== A Die Hard Christmas ====
The official description read:

A delightful Christmas storybook for adults based on the action-packed Die Hard movie.

All John McClane wants for Christmas is to reunite with his estranged family. But when his wife's office holiday party turns into a deadly hostage situation, he has to save her life before he can get home in time for Christmas!

The unconventional fan-favorite movie Die Hard is now an illustrated storybook—complete with machine guns, European terrorists, and a cop who's forced to rely on all his cunning and skills (and the help of a fellow officer) to save the day. Based on the classic Night Before Christmas poem and filled with whimsical illustrations, this cleverly reimagined homage is destined to become a holiday classic.

- Contains adult material including violence and strong language. Reader discretion is advised. Ho-ho-ho.

==== A Million Ways to Die Hard ====
In 2018, Insight Comics released the graphic novel A Million Ways to Die Hard. It was scripted by writer Frank Tieri and artist Mark Texeira.

The official description read:

Thirty years after the release of Die Hard, a retired John McClane is being pulled back into the game by a dangerous foe he never thought he'd face again—a psychotic serial killer with a theatrical taste for casting his victims in reproductions of Hollywood's greatest and deadliest films! Faced with impossible choices and unimaginable odds, A Million Ways To Die Hard just may be the last case John McClane ever has.

=== Video games ===
A number of video games based on the successful movie franchise Die Hard have been released over the years, ranging from beat 'em ups to first-person shooters. While some of the games are based directly on the films, a few detail the further adventures of John McClane:

- Die Hard for Nintendo Entertainment System, MS-DOS, Commodore 64, and PC Engine.
- Die Hard 2: Die Harder for MS-DOS, Commodore 64, Amiga and Atari ST.
- Die Hard Arcade (Dynamite Deka in Japan) for Arcade, Saturn, and PlayStation 2.
- Die Hard Trilogy for Windows, PlayStation, and Saturn.
- Die Hard Trilogy 2: Viva Las Vegas for Windows and PlayStation.
- Die Hard: Nakatomi Plaza for Windows.
- Die Hard: Vendetta for GameCube, Xbox, and PlayStation 2.
- Die Hard for Java phones, developed by Mobile Scope.
- Die Hard 4.0: The Mobile Game for mobile phones. Developed by Gameloft, mostly a re-skin of their earlier Mission: Impossible III.
- Die Hard for iOS and Android.
- A Good Day to Die Hard for Java and Android devices.

=== Commercial ===
DieHard is Back

In October 2020, Advance Auto Parts released the two-minute commercial short film DieHard is Back for the company's DieHard car-battery brand, with Bruce Willis, De'voreaux White and Clarence Gilyard Jr. reprising their roles as John McClane, Argyle, and Theo, respectively, from the first film. The narrative follows Theo, a former tech specialist of Hans Gruber, and others seeking to kill McClane as he tries to get a new car battery and replace the dead one in his car, with limousine-driver Argyle helping him along the way.

=== Other appearances ===
- The character John McClane also appears in the 1993 film Loaded Weapon 1, which is also portrayed by Bruce Willis, in a comical cameo appearance.
- The Cleveland Show features an episode called "Die Semi-Hard" parodying the first film; in another episode titled "Our Gang", Cleveland recites a speech referencing a scene in the first Die Hard; another delinquent teen asks him: "Are you the black guy in Die Hard?".
- The Dexter's Laboratory episode "Trapped with a Vengeance" parodies the title of the third film and the general plot of the first film.
- Family Guy has parodied and referenced the movie in several episodes; in "Meet the Quagmires", Peter tells Brian "Now I know what a TV dinner feels like", the same quote that McClane says while crawling through the air vent in the first film. In "Brian's Got a Brand New Bag", Brian impresses his girlfriend Rita by saying he was one of the cops in the first film. In "Roasted Guy", Peter shows a cutaway gag parodying the first film killing someone he accused of stealing his lunch. In "Shanksgiving" while the four main characters are in prison, Joe joins a prison gang called the "not cops" and says they are not watching Die Hard while commenting on the plot failings. In "Christmas is Coming" the School Choir sings a song about Die Hard in the tune of Silent Night with the following lyrics: "Die Hard, Die Hard / John McClane and his wife, Yippie-ki-yay Mother Fucker / Yippie-ki-yay Mother Fucker".
- Bruce Willis makes a voice cameo in the 2019 film The Lego Movie 2: The Second Part in which his character crawls through an air vent in a reference to his character from the first Die Hard film.
- Call of Duty Warzone and Call of Duty: Black Ops Cold War feature John McClane bundled with John Rambo as a playable DLC.
- In the series Brooklyn Nine-Nine, main protagonist Jake Peralta (portrayed by Andy Samberg) regularly mentions the films as his favorites, and several plot points of the series contain references to them.
- The Rick and Morty episode "Rick: A Mort Well Lived" features Die Hard-inspired alien terrorists fighting with Summer in an arcade, parodying the film. Summer is told by Rick to "do a Die Hard", ironically she defeats the aliens by avoiding tropes that are used in Die Hard.

== See also ==
- "Die Hard" phrase
