= List of Die Hard characters =

List of characters appearing in the film series Die Hard

The characters in the Die Hard film series, including John McClane (played by Bruce Willis), are based on the 1979 novel Nothing Lasts Forever by Roderick Thorp.

== Protagonists ==
=== John McClane ===
The reluctant hero in the series. John McClane is a New York City cop who finds himself taking on terrorists and saving his loved ones. In Die Hard, he gets invited to his wife's Christmas Party at Nakatomi Plaza in Los Angeles when the building she is in is under attack by terrorists led by Hans Gruber. McClane must stop his evil scheme before it is too late. McClane defeats the terrorists and thwarts Gruber's plan, sending him falling off the building. John and Holly reconcile and get back together.

In Die Hard 2, McClane now has a new problem and must battle anti-special forces mercenaries led by Colonel Stuart, who take over Dulles airport and leave several planes (including his wife Holly's) circling in the air running low on fuel, while also dealing with a difficult airport police captain. Once again, the day is saved when McClane takes out Stuart and his mercenaries by blowing up his plane with his Zippo lighter.

He is portrayed by Bruce Willis.

=== Holly Gennaro McClane ===
Holly McClane is John McClane's wife. Over the course of the series, their relationship becomes increasingly strained. They have two children together, John ("Jack") and Lucy. Holly is portrayed by actress Bonnie Bedelia in the first two films, Die Hard and Die Hard 2.

In Die Hard, Holly has recently moved to Los Angeles with Jack and Lucy to pursue a new career opportunity with Nakatomi Corporation. She is estranged from McClane, who decides to remain in New York City with the hope that Holly would return home.

In Die Hard 2, Holly and John appear to be on the path to reconciliation, although their relationship is far from perfect. Her role is significantly diminished from that of the first film.

Although Holly does not appear in Die Hard with a Vengeance, she is mentioned in dialogue. McClane makes an attempt to telephone her, and her voice is heard briefly on the phone. She still resides in Los Angeles and is still married to McClane.

In Live Free or Die Hard, cyber-terrorist Thomas Gabriel notes that McClane and Holly are now divorced.

In A Good Day to Die Hard, she is mentioned by John when John and Jack are on their mission.

=== Al Powell ===
Sgt. Al Powell was a cop who helps out McClane in the first two Die Hard films. In Die Hard on Christmas Eve he is sent to check Nakatomi Plaza to see if anything dangerous is going on. A terrorist falls out of one of the windows causing Powell to crash his car calling for more backup. He is played by Reginald VelJohnson.

=== Lucy McClane ===
Lucy is the daughter of John McClane & Holly Gennaro and the older sister of John "Jack" McClane Jr. She was estranged from her father, but during her college years in Rutgers University-Camden, she was kidnapped by cyber-terrorist Thomas Gabriel. After her father saves her and Matt Farrell, they seemed to be on speaking terms and that she changed her last name from Gennaro to McClane. Several years later, Lucy drove her father to the airport as he goes to Russia to investigate the arrest of her brother Jack. She was seen when John returns with Jack and she reunites with them after their adventure in Moscow and Chernobyl, Ukraine. She is portrayed by Taylor Fry in the first film and Mary Elizabeth Winstead in the last two films.

In Live Free or Die Hard, Lucy tells her boyfriend that McClane is dead and calls herself "Lucy Gennero", her mother's maiden name. She is later kidnapped by cyber-terrorist Thomas Gabriel for leverage against her father. She proves to be resilient, tells her father the positions of Gabriel's men, and injures one when McClane is incapacitated. By the end of the film, she calls herself "Lucy McClane" and develops feelings for a hacker called Matt Farrell.

Winstead reprised her role for a cameo appearance in A Good Day to Die Hard. Since Live Free or Die Hard, she and John have mended their relationship. After Lucy drops her father off to the airport, she warns her father "not to screw up" when he travels to Russia. She later calls him while he's in the middle of a car chase and he has to hang up. She meets his plane when he returns with Jack and happily reunites with both.

Prior to Live Free or Die Hard, Lucy was featured in the video game Die Hard: Vendetta as a member of the Los Angeles Police Department.

=== John "Jack" McClane Jr. ===
John "Jack" Jr. is the son of John McClane and Holly Gennaro and the younger brother of Lucy McClane. He plays a main role in A Good Day to Die Hard. When Jack is arrested for an assassination in a nightclub in Moscow, McClane who has not spoken to his son for several years, goes to him to find out what happened to him. It is later revealed that Jack is a CIA operative set on a deep-cover mission in Russia that has lasted for three years without his father's knowledge. He is portrayed by Noah Land in the first film and Jai Courtney in the fifth film.

In Live Free or Die Hard, cyber-terrorist Thomas Gabriel calls him Jack, which is a common alternative nickname for "John" in the United States. In early drafts of the script of Live Free or Die Hard, John Jr. was set to be in the film.

In A Good Day to Die Hard, Jack is a CIA agent stationed in Russia to extricate Yuri Komarov, a political prisoner who had evidence against Viktor Chagarin in a file at Chernobyl. To get close to Komarov, he kills a Russian millionaire and asks to testify against Komarov for a shorter sentence. John McClane goes to Russia after finding out about Jack's arrest, but not his CIA mission or ties. Similar to daughter Lucy in Live Free or Die Hard, son Jack was estranged from his father.

Jack and his father gain admiration and respect for each other. They take down Komarov and his daughter Irina and discover their true plot of retrieving weapon-grade uranium from Chernobyl. Jack throws Komarov to death into the rotor-blades of Irina's helicopter, after he claims John will die.

== Antagonists ==
=== Hans Gruber ===
Hans Gruber is the main antagonist of Die Hard. He is a cold and unpredictable ex-Volksfrei radical from Zittau in East Germany, who leads a gang of thieves who take over Nakatomi Plaza, imprisoning hostages as part of a scheme to heist $640 million in negotiable bearer bonds from the building's vault. His plan comes to a halt when John McClane kills three of his men and steals his bag of C-4 explosives. Gruber then sends Karl Vreski, Fritz, and Franco to retrieve them, all the while dealing with the police and the hostages. Gruber meets McClane himself disguised as "Wm Bill Clay", but is quickly discovered. A shootout with McClane ensues, and despite losing Fritz and Franco, he manages to retrieve the detonators and escape. He later discovers one of the hostages, Holly Gennaro, is McClane's wife, and keeps her as a hostage as he steals the bearer bonds. John McClane confronts Hans Gruber and his surviving henchman Eddie in the end and, although Gruber seems to have the upper hand, he is shot in the shoulder and falls out a window, still clinging to Holly. McClane saves his wife and Gruber falls to his death.

He was portrayed by Alan Rickman.

=== Karl Vreski ===
Karl Vreski is Hans Gruber's right-hand man, who leads the hunt for John McClane in Nakatomi Plaza. John seemingly kills Karl by hanging him from some chains. Karl survives and once more attempts to kill John, only to be shot dead by Al Powell.

He was portrayed by Alexander Godunov.

=== Theo ===
Theo is a computer hacker working for Hans Gruber who appears in Die Hard, and is the only African-American in the group. Theo is snarky and arrogant, often cracking jokes, even when others are killed. After the Nakatomi vault is opened, Theo attempts to prepare the terrorists' escape vehicle, only to be knocked unconscious by Argyle.

He was portrayed by Clarence Gilyard.

=== Eddie ===
Eddie is one of the terrorists working for Hans Gruber. During Sergeant Al Powell's inspection of the Nakatomi Plaza, Eddie disguises himself as a guard and convinces Powell nothing is wrong. Eddie ends up being one of the only remaining terrorists when Gruber holds Holly hostage, but is shot in the head by John.

He was portrayed by Dennis Hayden.

=== Others on Gruber's team ===
Gruber has 9 other men, besides the ones listed above, assisting him at Nakatomi Plaza on Christmas Eve.

- Tony Vreski (Andreas Wisniewski), Karl's brother, disables the phone lines at the beginning of the invasion. Tony is the first of the terrorists to be killed by McClane, who unintentionally breaks his neck in a fight.
- Franco (Bruno Doyon) is in charge of watching the hostages. He is shot in the knees by McClane, and then smashes his own head through a plate glass window as he falls, dying instantly. Franco and fellow accomplice Kristoff are both French.
- Uli (Al Leong), an Asian, is notably seen eating a candy bar during the shootout with the SWAT team. He is gunned down by McClane while forcing the hostages onto the roof.
- Fritz (Hans Buhringer) is a long-haired accomplice who is killed when McClane shoots him with a submachine gun.
- Kristoff (Gerard Bonn) is Theo's assistant. He is pistol whipped by McClane, and it is left unclear if he survived. Like Franco, Kristoff is also French.
- James (Wilhelm von Homburg) is one of the two men who fire the missile launcher. He is killed when McClane drops C4 down an elevator shaft leading to the floor James is on.
- Alexander (Joey Pluwa) is the other of the two who fire the missile launcher. He is killed in the C4 explosion alongside James.
- Heinrich (Gary Roberts) is in charge of the C4 and detonators. He is the second to be killed by McClane, who then has a shootout with Marco.
- Marco (Lorenzo Caccialanza) is an unhinged Italian accomplice. He is shot dead through a table by McClane, who tosses Marco's body out a window and onto Powell's car.

=== William Stuart ===
Colonel William Stuart is the main antagonist of Die Hard 2. He is an ex-Special Forces commander who leads a troop of soldiers who takeover Dulles Airport and use makeshift equipment from a church to control all flights from the main command Center, and to free dictator General Ramon Esperanza from Val Verde. He first meets McClane by chance when the two accidentally bump into each other. Stuart takes total control of the airport when his men destroy the main antenna array, and he discovers John McClane is foiling his mission. In retaliation for the soldiers he lost, Stuart causes a plane to crash and he warns the control tower and McClane to stay away from his business. He later receives contact from General Esperanza that he is landing the plane and to turn on the runway lights so he can safely land. Stuart and his men arrive to see him, only to be ambushed by McClane. Luckily, a soldier traps McClane in the cabin and Stuart commands his men to throw grenades in the cockpit. It explodes but McClane was barely able to escape the plane, and Stuart was forced to flee as cop cars were approaching. Back at the church, Stuart prepared a "shootout" with Major Grant and escaped via snowmobile. Now having Esperanza and Grant at his side, they leave the United States for an island on a jet, but are pursued by McClane. He gets the chance to fist fight McClane on the plane's wing and wins by knocking him off the wing. Unfortunately for Colonel Stuart, he did not see McClane pull the latch and cause fuel to leak, and Stuart is killed as the plane explodes.

He is portrayed by William Sadler.

=== Ramon Esperanza ===
General Ramon Esperanza is a cruel South American dictator and drug lord of the Republic of Val Verde.

He is portrayed by Franco Nero.

=== Major Grant ===
Major Grant is a corrupt Army special forces commander who appears in Die Hard 2.

He is portrayed by John Amos.

=== Simon Gruber ===
Simon Peter Gruber (alias Peter Krieg) is the main antagonist of Die Hard with a Vengeance. He is Hans Gruber's older brother, who at first seems to be avenging his brother's death from the first film. A puzzler, Simon makes John McClane play a twisted version of Simon Says. After a bomb destroyed a department store in Manhattan, Simon calls the NYPD Headquarters, taking responsibility for the bomb. He then orders the police to send John McClane to Harlem wearing a racist sign that reads "I Hate Niggers". Simon then orders John and his new partner shopkeeper Zeus Carver to reach a nearby telephone booth or else he will blow up another downtown building. He gives them a riddle to solve and answer in the form of a phone number. When they fail, he fools them that a trash can is now set to explode, only to reveal he did not say "Simon Says". Next, he orders both men to get to Wall Street Station within 30 minutes before a bomb is set to explode in the subway. Because both men failed to arrive at the subway station together, the bomb just about explodes near the station. It still does but nobody is killed. The second explosion was part of a scheme by Simon to create a pathway to break into the New York Federal Reserve Bank and steal gold bullion worth millions to billions of dollars. Simon then sends a threat warning to the police if they bother contacting themselves by radio, it will result in an explosion in one of many schools in downtown Manhattan. As the police are being lured to the schools, Simon on the other hand goes briefly undercover to enter his way through the main entrance of the bank. His henchmen break through the rear and steal millions in gold bullion that they load onto many dump trucks. The gold is subsequently exported to Quebec, Canada before Simon imprisons John McClane and Zeus Carver in his barge, where he reveals luring the police away was part of his plan to steal the gold and the real bomb was within the ship the whole time. When Simon flees to Quebec, his men celebrate with beer and Simon dedicates his success by having sex with his female accomplice Katya. But his plan is foiled when McClane and the Royal Canadian Mounted Police raid the warehouse and recover the stolen gold. When Simon attempts his escape in a helicopter, he is killed when McClane shoots an electric cable that catches fire on the helicopter's rotors and explodes.

He is portrayed by Jeremy Irons.

=== Katya ===
Katya is Simon Gruber's right-hand woman in Die Hard with a Vengeance.

=== Mathias Targo ===
Mathias Targo is a Hungarian bomb expert whom Simon hired.

=== Thomas Gabriel ===
Thomas Gabriel is a crazed former DOD (Department of Defense) agent turned cyber terrorist, and the main antagonist of Live Free or Die Hard. Gabriel is a hacker who attempted to show the DOD how the United States security features could be subject to a Fire Sale. No one believed him and he was relieved of his duties, which turned him against his country. He hired several criminal hackers all over the nation to assist him in his plot to shut down all computer-run systems in the United States. While at work with his task, his henchmen planted bombs in several homes with internet connectivity and killed every single one except for one young man named Matthew Farrell. John McClane, now an older man than when he last was involved in a deadly mission, saved him at the last minute; he was close to execution by Gabriel's bomb. Now with a victim on the loose, Gabriel orders his henchmen to track him and find him so he can continue his operation with his Fire Sale, a chain of events involving total control of the nations security systems and electrical power. With the help of Farrell, McClane works to stop Gabriel's Fire Sale, leading to Gabriel kidnapping McClane's daughter Lucy. During a final confrontation, Gabriel holds McClane at gunpoint and taunts him while digging his gun into a bullet wound in McClane's shoulder. In response, McClane grabs Gabriel's gun and fires it through himself and into Gabriel who is standing behind him, killing Gabriel.

He is portrayed by Timothy Olyphant.

=== Mai Linh ===
Mai Linh is Thomas Gabriel's girlfriend and second-in-command, who assists Gabriel in his plans to shut down the US infrastructure in order to steal billions of dollars from the Woodlawn Facility. She appeared in Live Free or Die Hard.

She is portrayed by Maggie Q.

=== Yuri Komarov ===
Yuri Komarov is a former Russian billionaire and political prisoner, and the main antagonist of A Good Day to Die Hard, although his true nature is not revealed until late in the story. A clever strategist, he pretends to be weak and feeble in the presence of his adversaries. He is initially held without trial for refusing to hand over a secret file containing incriminating evidence against former associate and corrupt politician Viktor Chagarin. Jack McClane, under arrest for an assassination attempt, agrees to testify against Komarov in court, in exchange for a shorter sentence. On the day of the trial, the courthouse is bombed by Chagarin's henchmen, led by Alik; in the confusion, Jack escapes with Komarov. John McClane, having come to Moscow to help his son, goes after them, and they are both pursued by Alik and his men. They lose their pursuers and go to a safe house, where Jack's CIA associates demand the location of the file from Komarov in order to bring down Chagarin. Komarov agrees to help on the condition that he and his daughter are given protection and safe passage out of Russia. The safe house is raided by Chagarin's men, but Komarov escapes with the McClanes; he leads them to a hotel to collect a key to the vault containing the file. His daughter Irina is there to meet him, as arranged, but she is revealed to be working for Chagarin for money. She and Alik take her father prisoner, traveling to Chernobyl, where the file is hidden. They enter the vault supposedly containing the file, but Komarov suddenly shoots Alik, before calling Chagarin and revealing that he and Irina planned all along to betray him. Komarov then has one of his men strangle Chagarin. The McClanes enter the vault, and Komarov tells them there never was a file; the vault is instead filled with vast stocks of weapons-grade uranium, worth billions. Irina comes to her father's aid, and a gunfight ensues; John pursues Irina, who escapes in a helicopter, while Jack goes after Komarov. The two face off on the roof, and Komarov taunts Jack, saying his father will soon be dead; enraged, Jack throws Komarov from the rooftop into the path of the whirling helicopter blades.

He is portrayed by Sebastian Koch.

== Allies ==
=== Al Powell ===
Al is a Los Angeles Police sergeant who shared a friendship with John McClane after helping with the takeover of Nakatomi Building in Los Angeles. During the first movie, Al is dispatched to check out McClane's emergency radio call and is nearly killed by the terrorists after McClane drops the body of Marco on his police car. Following this, Al communicates with McClane by radio, keeping his spirits up and keeping him apprised of the situation outside. At the end of the movie, McClane and Al meet face to face and Al kills the last terrorist, Karl, who had a personal grudge against McClane. In the second movie, McClane calls Al to run the fingerprints of a man he has killed. Al identifies the man as a Special Forces soldier who was supposedly killed two years prior in Honduras. Al's favorite snack is a Twinkie. He is portrayed by Reginald VelJohnson and appears in both Die Hard and Die Hard 2.

=== Argyle ===
Argyle is the limo driver assigned to pick up John McClane from LAX and transport him to the Nakatomi Plaza for the Nakatomi Corporation's 1988 Christmas party. Argyle offers to wait in the garage until John knows for certain if he was riding home with Holly or if he needed other transportation. He is unknowingly locked in the garage by the Nakatomi vault heist team. Near the end of the film, Argyle notices Theo trying to prepare an ambulance for the terrorists' escape. Argyle then rams the ambulance with his limo and knocks out Theo with a punch to the jaw. Argyle drives John and Holly home to celebrate Christmas Eve. Argyle is portrayed by De'voreaux White and appears in Die Hard.

=== Carmine Lorenzo ===
Carmine Lorenzo is the stubborn and initially incompetent Chief of Police of Dulles International Airport. He constantly argues with John McClane and give him problems when McClane tries to intervene and help them fight the terrorists, as he believes McClane to be arrogant. Despite this, however, he does grow to like McClane and later tears up his parking ticket as gratitude for stopping the terrorists. He is portrayed by Dennis Franz and appears in Die Hard 2.

=== Marvin ===
Marvin is an airport janitor who helps McClane in his mission to save the planes from low fuel. When he meets McClane, he first finds him suspicious and thought he was stealing his record. He is portrayed by Tom Bower and appears in Die Hard 2.

=== Leslie Barnes ===
Barnes is a chief engineer at Dulles airport and communications specialist. He is portrayed by Art Evans and appears in Die Hard 2.

=== Trudeau ===
Trudeau is the chief of operations at Dulles airport, who appeared in Die Hard 2. He is portrayed by Fred Dalton Thompson.

=== Corporal Telford ===
Corporal Telford is a new transfer to Major Grant's unit, replacing a sick soldier, who appears in Die Hard 2. After the battle with Colonel Stuart's men at the church, Telford is killed by Grant, who was working with Stuart. He is portrayed by Patrick O'Neal.

=== Zeus Carver ===
Carver is a black Harlem electrician and shop owner who saves McClane from a mob of gang members angered by the racist sign the latter was forced to wear by Simon. As punishment for interfering, Carver is forced by Simon to aid McClane through various dangerous tasks across New York City. Although he is prejudiced against white people, Carver eventually grows to respect McClane as the two effectively work together to complete each task. In the end after McClane kills Simon, Carver encourages McClane to patch things with his estranged wife, Holly. He is portrayed by Samuel L. Jackson and appears in Die Hard with a Vengeance.

=== Matt Farrell ===
Farrell is a computer hacker portrayed by Justin Long who inadvertently aids Thomas Gabriel in his Fire Sale. After being sent to bring Farrell in for questioning by the FBI, John McClane saves his life and teams up with Farrell to stop Gabriel. During the final confrontation, Farrell is forced to decode Gabriel's stolen data he'd previously encrypted to hinder him with the lives of McClane and his daughter Lucy on the line. After McClane kills Gabriel, Farrell is able to reach McClane's gun in time to shoot Gabriel's last henchman dead, saving McClane's life. He later expresses an interest in Lucy, something she returns to McClane's annoyance. He appears in Live Free or Die Hard.

=== Warlock ===
Warlock, real name Freddy Kaludis, is a hacker and an old friend of Matt Farrell's from space camp. When Thomas Gabriel shuts down the nation, Warlock is still online due to his generators and Farrell and John McClane enlist his help in finding Gabriel. Though reluctant, Warlock aids the two in tracking Gabriel who contacts them through Warlock's equipment and threatens the life of Lucy McClane. McClane later uses the CB radio in the terrorists hijacked truck to contact Warlock and ask him to connect McClane to Deputy Director Bowman of the FBI. While Warlock initially refuses to contact the head of the FBI's Cyber Division, he agrees after being informed that Lucy has been kidnapped by Gabriel and connects McClane and Bowman. He is portrayed by actor/comedian Kevin Smith and appears in Live Free or Die Hard.

=== Miguel Bowman ===
Bowman is a deputy director in the FBI and is in charge of the Cyber Division and thus the country's infrastructure. When Thomas Gabriel begins his Fire Sale, Bowman orders all known hackers brought in for questioning before a fake anthrax alarm forces Bowman and his men to evacuate. While dealing with the situation, Bowman is approached by John McClane and Matt Farrell, one of the hackers Bowman had ordered brought to him and who had been the target of an assassination attempt by Gabriel's men. While dismissing Farrell's theory of a Fire Sale, Bowman sends him to the Department of Homeland Security to tell them what he knows. McClane later notifies Bowman of the failure of their attempt to reach Homeland Security and the two men watch Gabriel start to terrorize the country before being cut-off. Bowman later identifies Gabriel for McClane after being sent a picture of him and explains Gabriel's history before losing contact. When Farrell sets off an alarm at the Woodlawn Building, Bowman personally leads an assault team to stop the terrorists before McClane contacts him once again with the help of the hacker Warlock. McClane warns Bowman that Gabriel has captured his daughter and Farrell and gives Bowman the license plate number of Gabriel's Hazmat van so Bowman can use its lo jack system to track the terrorists. At McClane's insistence, Bowman promises to take care of Lucy if anything happens to McClane. After the terrorists are dead, Bowman and his team finally arrive at their hideout. As his men threaten Matt Farrell, Bowman calls them off and later thanks McClane for his help. He is portrayed by actor Cliff Curtis and appears in Live Free or Die Hard.

=== Mike Collins ===
Mike Collins is a CIA Agent and Jack McClane's partner during the operation in arresting Victor Chagarin. Collins meets John, Komarov, and Jack. They are suddenly attacked by a sniper, who shoots Collins in the head.

He is portrayed by Cole Hauser and appears in A Good Day to Die Hard.
