= Die Hard 2 (soundtrack) =

Die Hard 2: Original Motion Picture Soundtrack

Film score by Michael Kamen
- Released: August 31, 1993
- Recorded: 1990
- Studios: 20th Century Fox Scoring Stage, 20th Century Fox, Los Angeles
- Genre: Film score
- Length: 40:37 (standard); 122:11 (deluxe)
- Label: Varèse Sarabande
- Producers: Michael Kamen; Christopher S. Brooks; Stephen P. McLaughlin

Michael Kamen chronology
Cold Dog Soup (1990)	Die Hard 2 (1990)	The Krays (1990)

Die Hard 2: Original Motion Picture Soundtrack is the film score to the 1990 film Die Hard 2, the second film in the Die Hard film series starring Bruce Willis as John McClane. The film score is composed by Michael Kamen which reuses few themes from the first film's score and excerpts from Jean Sibelius' poem "Finlandia" incorporated into the score. It was recorded at the 20th Century Fox Scoring Stage and performed by the Los Angeles Motion Picture All-Star Orchestra.

== Release history ==
Die Hard 2's score was not released along with the film; it was published by Varèse Sarabande on August 31, 1993, three years after the film's release. The accompanying album consisted only 40 minutes of music, part of an hour's score being used in the film. On November 5, 2012, Varèse Sarabande published a 2-CD deluxe edition which consisted of the complete score and alternate cues which were not used in the score.

== Critical reception ==
Jonathan Broxton in his review for Movie Music UK wrote "Die Hard 2 is one of Michael Kamen’s most bombastic action scores, and was written during the period where his action music was successful and ubiquitous in Hollywood [...] his true genius was revealed when he composed from the heart rather than the bicep; his beautiful dramatic and romantic scores offered a much more revealing portrait of who he was as a person. Despite this, Die Hard 2 offers more than half an hour of Kamen action music at its best, and will offer a perfect illustration of why he was so in demand for so much of the late 1980s and 1990s." Christian Clemmensen of Filmtracks.com wrote "Die Hard 2 is a sufficient and occasionally entertaining score, serving as a decent alternative on album (either on the shorter or longer releases) for those who do not care to spend a fortune on the historically rare Die Hard albums." Steven McDonald of AllMusic wrote "there's something very traditionally 1950s about much of this score—the drawn-out orchestral stabs, for example, are classic stuff that resemble any one of a dozen Bernard Herrmann thriller scores; one can almost see the odd angles, the monochromatic film noir photography, the desperate looks and desperate actions, and jarring cutaways. In that, it's terrific homage. However, it's not likely to make it a regular visitor to the CD player in the average soundtrack buff's household."

== Track listing ==
=== Standard edition ===
Die Hard 2: Original Motion Picture Soundtrack standard track listing
No.	Title	Length
1.	"Colonel Stuart"	1:29
2.	"Baggage Handling"	3:48
3.	"General Esperanza"	2:14
4.	"The Annexe Skywalk"	3:11
5.	"The Church"	1:15
6.	"The Doll"	3:50
7.	"The Runway"	3:57
8.	"In The Plane"	1:37
9.	"Icicle"	2:53
10.	"Snowmobiles"	2:40
11.	"The Terminal"	6:13
12.	"Finlandia"	7:30
Total length:		40:37

=== Deluxe edition ===
Die Hard 2: Original Motion Picture Soundtrack deluxe disc one track listing
No.	Title	Length
1.	"Nude Tai Chi / Marching Through the Hotel Corridor"	1:28
2.	"Colonel Stuart"	3:05
3.	"Could We Have a Few Words Please"	1:04
4.	"Into the Baggage Area / Baggage Flight"	5:16
5.	"Snowfall on Blueprints"	1:15
6.	"General Esperanza"	2:12
7.	"Dead for Two Years"	1:57
8.	"Powering Up"	6:29
9.	"Kicked Out of the Tower"	2:07
10.	"Marching to the Annex"	3:26
11.	"Skywalk Shootout"	3:34
12.	"Skywalk Aftermath / Looking for a New Miracle"	2:34
13.	"Attention Dulles Tower"	1:27
14.	"Crashing the Jet"	5:56
15.	"John Picks Up Doll"	2:36
16.	"The Army's Arrival / The Idea"	3:49
17.	"Colonel Stuart's Speech"	1:14
18.	"Landing Esperanza's Plane"	3:00
19.	"Meeting Esperanza"	4:33
20.	"John Punches Esperanza"	3:18
Total length:		60:20

Die Hard 2: Original Motion Picture Soundtrack disc two track listing
No.	Title	Length
1.	"Little Problems"	1:40
2.	"Fight with the Sentry / Fight at the Church Continues"	3:12
3.	"Shootout and Snowmobile Chase"	6:48
4.	"Dick-Head"	6:53
5.	"Chasing the Jet"	3:08
6.	"Fight on the Wing"	5:19
7.	"Fight on the Wing Continues"	4:04
8.	"Finlandia" (Finale; composed by Jean Sibelius)	4:04
9.	"The First Killings" (alternate)	1:51
10.	"Baggage Flight" (alternate)	4:17
11.	"Powering Up" (alternate)	4:16
12.	"Attention Dulles Tower" (alternate)	1:30
13.	"Crashing The Jet"	2:14
14.	"Colonel Stuart's Speech" (alternate)	1:12
15.	"The Doll" (album version)	3:54
16.	"Finlandia" (End Titles; composed by Jean Sibelius)	7:29
Total length:		61:51

== Personnel ==
Album credits

- Composer and conductor – Michael Kamen
- Producer – Christopher S. Brooks, Michael Kamen, Stephen P. McLaughlin
- Orchestra – Hollywood Studio Symphony, The Los Angeles Motion Picture All Stars Orchestra
- Orchestrators – Bruce Babcock, Chris Boardman, Don Davis, Mark Koval, Michael Kamen, Phil Giffin, Ron Gorow, William Ross
- Orchestra leader – Stuart Canin
- Recording and mixing – Armin Steiner
- Recordist – John Bruno
- Mixing – Mike Matessino
- Mastering – Daniel Hersch
- Score editor – Mike Matessino, Neil S. Bulk
- Supervising music editor – Christopher S. Brooks
- Assistant music editor – James J. George
- Scoring crew – Chuck Garsha, John Bruno, Terry Brown
- Music consultant – Eric Lichtenfeld
- Executive producer – Robert Townson

Performer credits

- Bass – Arni Egilsson, Barry Lieberman, Bruce Morgenthaler, Buell Neidlinger, Charles Domanico, Drew Dembowski, Ed Meares, Margaret Storer, Richard Feves, Susan Ranney, Tim Barr
- Bassoon – Charles Coker, David Riddles, Julie Feves, Ken Munday, Michele Grego
- Cello – Armand Kaproff, Barbara Hunter, David Shamban, Dennis Karmazyn, Douglas Davis, Fred Seykora, Jody Burnett, John Walz, Marie Fera, Paula Hochhalter, Ray Kramer, Robert Adcock
- Clarinet – Charles Boito, Dominick Fera, Jim Kanter
- Drums and percussions – Robert Zimmitti, Emil Radocchia, Larry Bunker, Peter Limonick, Steven Schaeffer
- Flute – Janet Ketchum, Paul Fried, Sheridon Stokes
- French horn – Brad Warnaar, Brian O'Connor, David A. Duke, Richard Perissi, Richard Todd, Vincent DeRosa
- Harp – Katie Kirkpatrick
- Keyboards – Artie Kane, Patrick Seymour
- Oboe – Barbara Northcutt, Don Ashworth, Joan Elardo, Leslie Reed, Tom Boyd
- Trombone – Alan Kaplan, Richard Nash, Lloyd Ulyate, Phillip Teele, Bob Payne
- Trumpet – Burnette Dillon, Malcolm McNab, Mario Guarneri
- Tuba – John T. Johnson
- Viola – Alan DeVeritch, Carol Mukogawa, David Schwartz, Denyse Buffum, Harry Shirinian, Janet Lakatos, Linda Lipsett, Linn Subotnick, Mihail Zinovyev, Myer Bello, Myra Kestenbaum, Peter Hatch, Ray Tischer, Roland Kato, Sam Boghossian, Valerie Dimond
- Violin – Alexander Treger, Alice Sachs, Anatoly Rosinsky, Arnold Belnick, Berj Garabedian, Bill Hybel, Bonnie Douglas, Bruce Dukov, Clayton Haslop, Connie Kupka, Daniel Shindaryov, Debra Price, Dixie Blackstone, Dorothy Wade, Edith Markman, Franklyn D'Antonio, Gwenn Heller, Haim Shtrum, Harold Wolf, Harris Goldman, Herman Clebanoff, Irma Neumann, Israel Baker, Jacqueline Brand, James Getzoff, Jennifer Small, Jennifer Woodward, Josef Brooks, Joy Lyle, Julie Gigante, Karen Jones, Mari Botnick-Tsumura, Marshall Sosson, Michael Markman, Nancy Roth, Nathan Kaproff, Patricia Johnson, Paul Shure, Polly Sweeney, Ralph Morrison, Rene Mandel, Ron Clark, Ronald Folsom, Russ Cantor, Sheldon Sanov, Sid Sharp, Spiro Stamos, Stanley Plummer, Stuart Canin
