= Die Hard (video game) =

1991 video game

- Developers: Pack-In-Video (NES/TG-16); Dynamix (MS-DOS); Silent Software (C64)
- Publishers: JP: Nichibutsu; NA: Activision
- Designer: Tony Van (NES)
- Composer: Kenji Yoshida (TG-16)
- Platforms: Commodore 64, NES, MS-DOS, PC Engine
- Release: MS-DOS: NA: December 1989; TurboGrafx-16: JP: September 28, 1990; Commodore 64: NA/EU: 1990; NES: JP: July 19, 1991; NA: January 1992; EU: 1992
- Genres: Side-scrolling, shooter, action-adventure
- Mode: Single-player

Die Hard (Note: Japanese: ダイ・ハード, Hepburn: Dai Hādo) is the name of four video games, one released for MS-DOS systems in 1989, one released for the Commodore 64 in 1990, one released for the PC Engine in 1990 and the other for the NES in 1991 by Activision. Its gameplay is based on the 1988 film of the same name. During the game, the player rescues hostages and battles with terrorists from a top view perspective at Nakatomi Plaza in Los Angeles.

== Plot ==
John McClane decides to visit his wife Holly in Nakatomi Plaza, only to discover that she is taken hostage on the 30th floor, along with a number of other hostages. The terrorist leader, Hans Gruber, is after the money locked away in a safe on the 30th floor. His hacker, Theo, is slowly breaking the locks into the vault. McClane decides to fight the terrorists on his own, ascending the building as he does so.

== Gameplay (NES) ==
There are 40 terrorists scattered throughout the building, and John McClane's task is to clear each floor of terrorists, and using the stairwell or the express elevator to travel between floors 31 and 35 (with more floors being unlocked in "Advanced" mode). By shooting at grids in the wall, John is also able to climb in the vents, dropping into a designated spot or moving down or up a floor.

At the start of the game, the player character can only use a pistol (with 15 bullets) and his fists to dispose of enemies, but later acquires several weapons, such as submachine guns, explosives, rocket launchers, flamethrowers and flashbangs which the terrorists can also use. When McClane is shot, a few picked up items can drop where he must pick them up again. The player's bullets have minimal range, and due to the control scheme can only be aimed at 90- or 45-degree angles. However once acquired, the submachine gun can also fire a spray of bullets in an arc, allowing for more firing angles. McClane's health, which is drained by bullet wounds, can be restored by collecting soda cans from enemies, snack machines (by shooting several bullets at them) or empty rooms. The player loses the game when all life is lost.

The player has about four minutes before one of the six locks are opened, but can gain more time by destroying the main computer on the fourth floor. Once all the locks have been opened, the vault is opened and the game's final battle is triggered. The player has only a few minutes to go to the 30th floor, for a final confrontation with Karl, Hans, and any of the 40 terrorists left alive.

During the game, the player is initially aware of Hans shouting orders to his guards through a two-way radio. After the second lock is opened, Hans will tell everyone to not use the radio. Also notable is the "foot meter". The meter starts out full, but will eventually decrease if the player character steps on shattered glass or runs around. If the meter becomes empty, McClane will walk much slower than he does when the foot meter is full. It can be restored by collecting med-kits.

The game features cinematic sequences, which change the story depending on which actions the player takes. For example, if there is less than one minute left, and the player defeats Karl, the last scene with John and Holly will tell the player the roof has been destroyed by the helicopter sent by Hans.

== Version differences ==
The NES and PC Engine ports of the game are played from a top-down perspective. The Commodore 64 port shows a side view of the player in a side-scrolling format. The camera remains fixed behind the player at all times in the DOS port.

The PC Engine/TurboGrafx-16 version was developed by Pack-In-Video and published by Nichibutsu. This version saw its early life as an entirely different game in an overhead action-shooter format. At some point, to draw attention and boost sales, Nihon secured the Die Hard license and made many changes to the original product, including character models and the plot, to coincide with the film. Because of this, the game takes several liberties with the source material, such as McClane fighting his way through a jungle, then a Vietnamese river while shooting an assortment of generic enemies such soldiers, Vietnamese troops and security guards before finally reaching the basement of Nakatomi Plaza to climb to the top a destroy an enemy attack helicopter to rescue his wife, Holly. Also in this version, Hans Gruber only appears in a cutscene; John never fights him directly.
