= Live Free or Die Hard (soundtrack) =

Live Free or Die Hard: Original Motion Picture Soundtrack

Film score by Marco Beltrami
- Released: July 2, 2007
- Recorded: 2007
- Studios: Newman Scoring Stage, 20th Century Fox, Los Angeles
- Genre: Film score
- Length: 63:06
- Label: Varèse Sarabande
- Producers: Marco Beltrami; Buck Sanders

Marco Beltrami chronology
The Invisible (2007)	Live Free or Die Hard (2007)	Captivity (2007)

Live Free or Die Hard: Original Motion Picture Soundtrack is the film score soundtrack to the 2007 film Live Free or Die Hard, the fourth instalment in the Die Hard film series. The film score was composed by Marco Beltrami, who incorporates the compositions by Michael Kamen for the predecessors, conducted by Pete Anthony and performed by the Hollywood Studio Symphony. The soundtrack was released under the Varèse Sarabande label on July 2, 2007.

== Development ==
Michael Kamen, the principal composer who scored the previous instalments in the Die Hard series, died on November 18, 2003. The score for Live Free or Die Hard was composed by Marco Beltrami who incorporated Kamen's thematic material into his score. Beltrami and Len Wiseman thought that the score should pay homage to Kamen's work from the predecessors, but the studio wanted a score that sounded modern. To achieve this, he used the chord voices in the brass and the motifs and string figures that scored the film in a modern setting but used them throughout the film as recurrent motifs. The orchestration and musical construction of violins and brass, both melodically and rhythmically mimics Kamen's orchestral style.

== Reception ==
Thomas Glorieux of Maintitles.net wrote "It isn't music that makes a large impression, and mostly it's based on stuff we heard of the composer before. The Kamen influence is nice from a fan's point of view, but really not that important. And for the rest, we receive exquisite action material from a technical point of view, but hardly memorable as well." A reviewer from Film Music Central wrote "Marco Beltrami’s score is relatively simplistic but it serves the needs of the film, which is a big plus given how bad most of the film was." Christian Clemmensen of Filmtracks.com wrote "Given the disappointment with the adaptation work in Terminator 3, this is a definite step in the right direction. But in the end, the Live Free or Die Hard score, like the movie, simply goes through familiar moves that may or may not be enough to sustain your interest."

Eric Lichtenfeld, reviewing from Soundtrack.net, said of the film score: "Live Free or Die Hard has a handful of cues you may well want to crank up. It just doesn't have many you will want to hum afterwards. Or remember for very long." James Leonard of AllMusic reviewed, "As a piece of pure music, the score for Live Free Or Die Hard is pretty negligible. As a soundtrack for a Bruce Willis picture, however, it doesn't get any better." Kaya Savas of MovieWeb wrote "Moving onto the score this brings up Marco Beltrami. I can state here that I am not a Marco Beltrami fan. The only score of his that I liked was his score to The Three Burials Of Melquiades Estrada. I always feel like he never does anything thematic at all and which is why I was worried when he was selected to fill Michael Kamen's shoes. Michael Kamen was the composer of the first three Die Hard films, but he died in 2003. He was a greatly respected composer and his work on the first three Die Hards were iconic. Thankfully Marco Beltrami rose to the occasion and did a wonderful tribute with his score to Live Free Or Die Hard. He touches on some themes that Kamen wrote and gives it that Die Hard feel and atmosphere."

== Track listing ==
Live Free or Die Hard: Original Motion Picture Soundtrack track listing
No.	Title	Length
1.	"Out of Bullets"	1:06
2.	"Shootout"	3:40
3.	"Leaving the Apartment"	2:08
4.	"Dead Hackers"	1:31
5.	"Traffic Jam"	4:12
6.	"It's a Fire Sale"	2:56
7.	"The Break-In"	2:27
8.	"Farrell to D.C."	4:35
9.	"Copter Chase"	4:41
10.	"Blackout"	2:03
11.	"Illegal Broadcast"	3:47
12.	"Hurry Up!"	1:22
13.	"The Power Plant"	2:01
14.	"Landing"	2:27
15.	"Cold Cuts"	1:59
16.	"Yippee Ki Yay"	4:42
17.	"Break a Neck"	2:47
18.	"Farrell Is In"	4:22
19.	"The F-35"	4:12
20.	"Aftermath"	3:12
21.	"Live Free or Die Hard"	2:56
Total length:		63:06

== Personnel ==
- Music – Marco Beltrami
- Additional music – Marcus Trumpp
- Producer – Marco Beltrami, Buck Sanders
- Engineer – Denis St. Amand
- Recording – John Kurlander, Kevin Globerman
- Digital recordist – Tim Lauber
- Mixing – John Kurlander
- Mastering – Erick Labson
- Music editor – Alex Gibson, Kevin Globerman
- Music co-ordinator – Rebecca Morellato
- Executive producer – Robert Townson

Orchestra

- Performer – The Hollywood Studio Symphony
- Orchestration – Bill Boston, Ceiri Torjussen, Dana Niu, Jim Honeyman, Jon Kull, Marcus Trumpp, Mary Finsterer, Pete Anthony, Rossano Galante, Tim Perrine
- Conductor – Marco Beltrami, Pete Anthony
- Contractor – Peter Rotter
- Concertmaster – Endre Granat
- Copyist – JoAnn Kane Music Services
- Stage manager – Francesco Perlangeli, Tom Steel

Instruments

- Bass – Christian Kollgaard, Drew D Dembowski, Michael Valerio, Oscar Hidalgo, Susan Ranney, Nico Carmine Abondolo
- Bassoon – Judith Farmer, Kenneth Munday, Michael R. O'Donovan
- Cello – Armen Ksajikian, Cecilia Tsan, Christine Ermacoff, Dane Little, David Speltz, Dennis Karmazyn, Hugh B. Livingston, Steve Erdody
- Clarinet – Joshua Ranz, Ralph Williams, Gary S. Bovyer
- Flute – David Shostac, Stephen Kujala, Geraldine Rotella
- Harp – Marcia Dickstein
- Horn – David Duke, Kristy Morrell, Richard Todd, Brian D.A. O'Connor
- Oboe – Barbara Northcutt, Phillip Ayling
- Percussion – Alan Estes, Daniel Greco, Marvin B. Gordy III, Thomas Raney, Wade Culbreath
- Piano – Randy Kerber
- Trombone – Andrew Thomas Malloy, William F. Reichenbach, Alan Kaplan
- Trumpet – Warren H. Luening, Wayne Bergeron, Jon Lewis
- Tuba – Doug Tornquist
- Viola – Darrin McCann, David F. Walther, Kathryn Reddish, Keith Greene, Marlow Fisher, Rick Gerding, Robert Berg, Shanti D. Randall, Steven Gordon, Victoria Miskolczy
- Violin – Alyssa Park, Anatoly Rosinsky, Bruce Dukov, Dimitrie Leivici, Eric J. Hosler, Eun-Mee Ahn, Irina Voloshina, Jacqueline Brand, Jay Rosen, Josefina Vergara, Katia Popov, Kenneth Yerke, Kevin Connolly, Lily Ho Chen, Marc Sazer, Mario DeLeon, Natalie Leggett, Phillip Levy, Rafael Rishik, Richard L. Altenbach, Roberto Cani, Sarah Thornblade, Shalini Vijayan, Songa Lee, Tamara Hatwan, Julie Ann Gigante
