= Got It Covered =

Got It Covered may refer to:

- Got It Covered, a 2019 album by Ty Herndon
- Got It Covered, a 2019 album and TV production by BBC Studios Productions, for the Children in Need charity
- "Got It Covered", a 1995 song by Fu-Schnickens from the Die Hard with a Vengeance soundtrack
