= A Good Day to Die Hard =

2013 action film directed by John Moore

- Theatrical release poster
- Directed by: John Moore
- Written by: Skip Woods
- Based on: Characters by Roderick Thorp
- Produced by: Alex Young; Wyck Godfrey
- Starring: Bruce Willis; Jai Courtney; Sebastian Koch; Yulia Snigir; Rasha Bukvić; Cole Hauser; Amaury Nolasco; Sergei Kolesnikov
- Cinematography: Jonathan Sela
- Edited by: Dan Zimmerman
- Music by: Marco Beltrami
- Production companies: Giant Pictures; Temple Hill Entertainment
- Distributed by: 20th Century Fox
- Release dates: January 31, 2013 (Leicester Square); February 14, 2013 (United States)
- Running time: 98 minutes
- Country: United States
- Languages: English; Russian
- Budget: $92 million
- Box office: $304.7 million

A Good Day to Die Hard is a 2013 American action thriller film, and the fifth and final installment in the Die Hard film series. The film was directed by John Moore and written by Skip Woods, and stars Bruce Willis as John McClane in his final film in the franchise. The main plot finds McClane traveling to Russia to get his estranged son, Jack, an undercover CIA agent, out of prison. He is soon caught in the crossfire of a global terrorist plot. Alongside Willis, the film also stars Jai Courtney, Sebastian Koch, Cole Hauser and Yulia Snigir.

Talks of a fifth Die Hard film began before the release of the fourth installment, Live Free or Die Hard, with Willis affirming that the latter would not be the last in the series, but pre-production did not start until September 2011, when John Moore was officially announced as the director. Filming began in April 2012, primarily in Budapest, Hungary.

A Good Day to Die Hard premiered in London on January 31, 2013 by 20th Century Fox, coinciding with the unveiling of a Die Hard mural at the Fox Lot, and was released in North America on February 13, 2013. Unlike the film's predecessors, it received negative reviews from critics, but it was a box office success, grossing $304.7 million against a budget of $92 million.

It is the first film financed by TSG Entertainment, since distributor 20th Century Fox's departure from Dune Entertainment upon the completion of their distribution contract at the end of 2012.

== Plot ==
In Moscow, Viktor Chagarin, a high-ranking, corrupt Russian official, plans to incriminate former billionaire and government whistleblower Yuri Komarov in a rigged trial unless he hands over a secret file believed to contain evidence incriminating Chagarin. Separately, Jack McClane, arrested after an assassination attempt, negotiates for a shorter sentence by offering to testify against Komarov.

Jack's father, NYPD Police Detective John McClane, who has not been in touch with his son for several years, learns he is in trouble and flies to Russia. As John approaches the courthouse where Komarov is on trial, an explosion orchestrated by Chagarin's henchman Alik occurs in the courthouse, and Jack breaks free with Komarov. John confronts Jack, but their dispute is cut short as Alik and his men chase them in an MRAP through Moscow.

Hiding in a safe house, John finds out that Jack is a CIA operative and has been on an undercover operation for the past three years. Jack's partner, Mike Collins, demands the file's location from Komarov so the CIA can bring Chagarin down. He agrees on the condition that he and his daughter are given safe passage out of Russia. The group are ambushed by Chagarin's men; Collins is shot and killed while the McClanes and Komarov escape, making their way to a hotel to get the safe deposit box key containing the file. There they meet up with Komarov's daughter, Irina, as planned. Alik and his men burst in and tie up John and Jack, taking Komarov hostage; Irina confesses to informing on them. Jack breaks free of his ties and he and John kill most of the guards present. Alik and Irina, with Komarov still their hostage, return in a Mil Mi-24 attack helicopter and try to kill them, but they escape.

That night, Jack and John steal a car full of weapons, driving to Pripyat, Ukraine, where the safe deposit box with the file is located, only to find that Komarov, Irina, and Alik are already there. The safe deposit box with the supposed file is a secret passage to a Chernobyl-era vault containing €1 billion worth of weapons-grade uranium. It turns out that there is no secret file and Komorov and Irina have concocted a scheme to steal the uranium deposit to make big money in the black market, luring the attention of the CIA to safely conduct the operation under their protection. Komarov kills Alik and calls Chagarin to gloat as the latter is killed by one of Komarov's men while he is in a sauna.

As John and Jack enter the vault, Komarov pretends that he is glad that they are coming to save him but Jack realizes the uranium in the vault and figures out the whole scheme. As he and John prepare to apprehend Komarov, Irina and some henchmen come to her father's aid. As they prepare to leave, Jack follows Komarov, while John goes after Irina, who is escaping in a Mil Mi-26 helicopter; he sneaks into the rear compartment. Irina tries to protect her father by firing the helicopter's guns at Jack, but John is able to bring the helicopter off balance by driving a truck out of the cargo section while it is secured to the helicopter by a chain. Komarov taunts Jack by saying he will get to watch his father die, prompting Jack to hurl him off the rooftop and into the spinning helicopter blades, killing him. John is thrown from the truck and into the building.

As Jack and John reunite, Irina tries to avenge her father by ramming the helicopter, now out of ammunition, into the building in a suicide attack. John and Jack leap off the building into a large pool of water as the helicopter crashes and explodes, killing Irina.

Having reconciled, John and Jack fly back home to the United States and are reunited with an excited Lucy.

== Cast ==
- Bruce Willis as NYPD Detective John McClane
- Jai Courtney as CIA Officer John "Jack" McClane Jr.
- Sebastian Koch as Yuri Komarov
- Yulia Snigir as Irina Komarova
- Radivoje Bukvić as Alik
- Sergei Kolesnikov as Viktor Chagarin
- Mary Elizabeth Winstead as Lucy McClane
- Cole Hauser as CIA Officer Mike Collins
- Aldis Hodge as Lieutenant Foxy. Hodge previously played Raymond Carver in Die Hard with a Vengeance.
- Amaury Nolasco as NYPD Detective Murphy
- Megalyn Echikunwoke as Pretty Reporter
- Pasha D. Lychnikoff as Russian Cab Driver
- Roman Luknár as Anton
- Ganxsta Zolee as MRAP Driver

== Production ==
=== Pre-production ===
Production was formally announced in 2010, with X-Men Origins: Wolverine and The A-Team writer Skip Woods confirmed as the film's screenwriter. Noam Murro was originally attached to direct the film but left production to direct the 300 prequel, 300: Rise of an Empire. John Moore was subsequently drafted in to replace him.

The film was originally titled Die Hard 24/7. That title resulted in media speculation that the film would be a crossover between the Die Hard and 24 series, with Kiefer Sutherland to reprise his role as Jack Bauer alongside John McClane. The film's title was later revealed to be A Good Day to Die Hard—with no further mention of any involvement from the 24 series—with a release date of February 14, 2013.

=== Casting ===
When casting the role of Jack McClane, the studios considered several actors, including Liam Hemsworth, Aaron Paul, and James Badge Dale, before ultimately settling on Australian actor Jai Courtney. Mary Elizabeth Winstead also appeared in the film, reprising her role as McClane's daughter Lucy. However, all her scenes were cut from the Extended release.

Sebastian Koch played the film's primary antagonist, Yuri Komarov, while Yulia Snigir and Cole Hauser featured as secondary characters Irina and Collins. The cast was completed by actors Amaury Nolasco as a friend of McClane, Pasha D. Lychnikoff as a taxi driver, and Megalyn Echikunwoke, Anne Vyalitsyna, and Ivan Kamaras in smaller roles.

=== Filming ===
Production began in Hungary in April 2012, with the capital Budapest standing in for Moscow. A military shooting range near Hajmáskér was used for shooting live ammunition, while vehicular stunts were shot at the Hungaroring, a Formula One racing circuit in Mogyoród.

In July 2012, a fire broke out on the set while shooting an aerial stunt, though no one was injured and shooting resumed after a short delay.

In creating the film's visual style, Moore wanted the camera work to be almost entirely handheld, using three 4 Perforation 35mm Arri cameras equipped with long lenses to capture tight close-ups, for Moore explained, "McClane is in a strange world, with little or no initial control over his environment. He's unable to anticipate things as he normally might. He's caught off guard, and we want the camera to mimic that surprise and confusion." Moore also chose to create as many of the film's effects on camera as possible, only using visual effects to enhance elements or paint in backgrounds.

=== Post-production ===
A specially censored version was prepared for theatrical release in the United Kingdom, which was cut for language and violence in order to attain a 12A at the request of the distributors. The film's audio was mixed in Dolby Atmos surround sound. In February 2013, director Moore began work on a director's cut, which was later released on Blu-ray.

Bruce Willis returned as John McClane, and had expressed a desire to shoot an additional installment in the series following A Good Day To Die Hard before retiring the character. However, in March 2022 Willis retired from acting, due to being diagnosed with aphasia, making this the last film in the series. Nearly a year later he was diagnosed with frontotemporal dementia.

== Music ==
Marco Beltrami, who had composed the soundtrack for the previous film, Live Free or Die Hard, returned to score A Good Day to Die Hard. Beltrami again incorporates Michael Kamen's material from the first three films into his score. Beltrami only had six weeks in which to write the music, and new scenes were still being shot as the music was being recorded. In the end, he wrote around 120 minutes of music, with 80 of those minutes making it into the final film. The soundtrack album was released on February 12, 2013, digitally and in retailers by Sony Classical. Five orchestrators were involved: Pete Anthony, Jon Kull, Dana Niu, Rossana Galante, Andrew Kinny. The orchestra was conducted by Pete Anthony.

The score was programmed by Buck Sanders, with additional music composed by Marcus Trumpp and Brandon Roberts.

== Release ==
=== Marketing ===
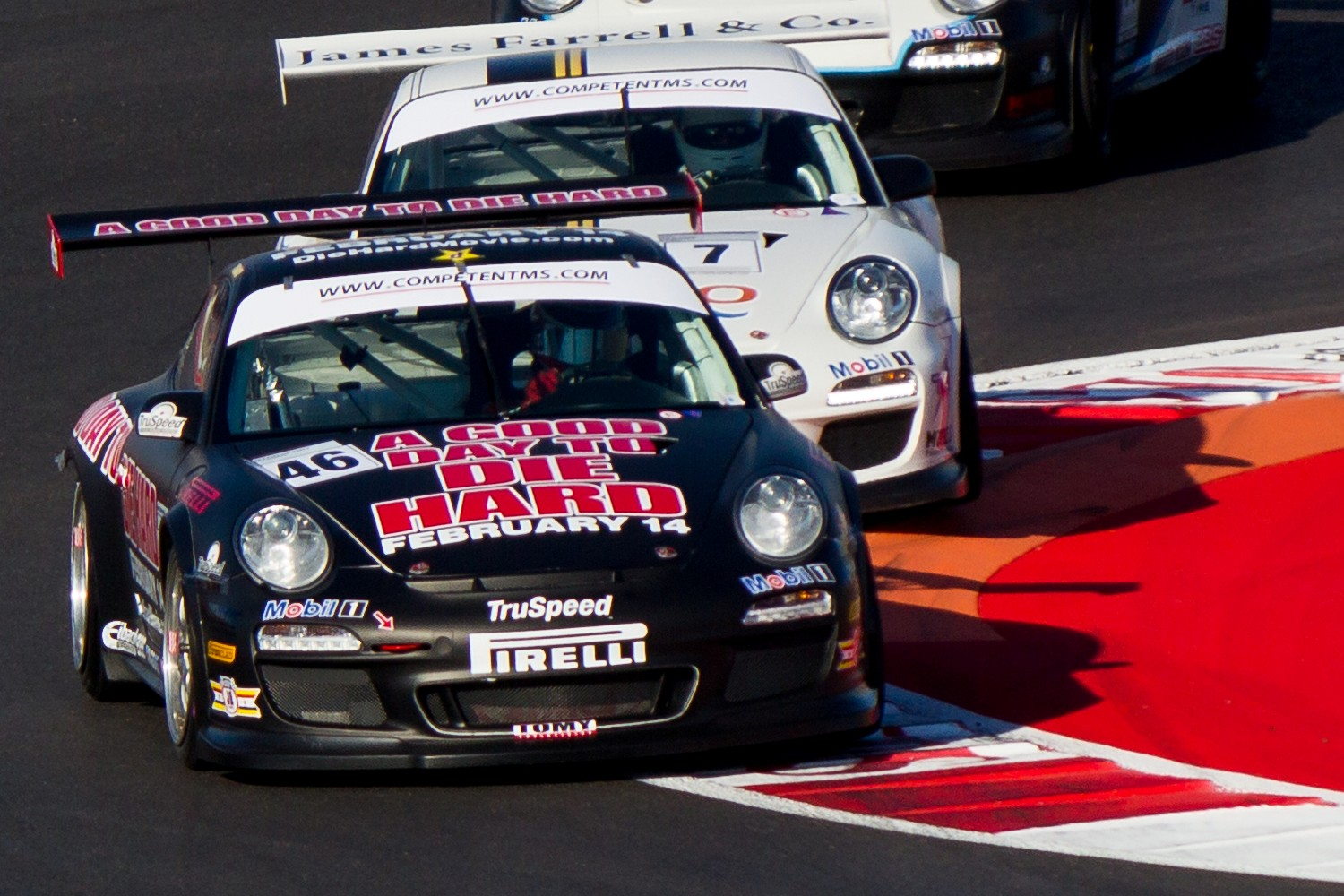
#46 TruSpeed Porsche GT3 during a race of the 2012 Supercup (that ran as a support to the 2012 USGP) promoting the release date on February 14, 2013

On January 31, 2013, 20th Century Fox held a special tribute to the 25th anniversary of the Die Hard series by unveiling a mural of a scene from Die Hard (1988) on Sound Stage 8 of the Fox Lot. Afterward, the premiere screening of A Good Day to Die Hard was shown. Two additional premieres were held in Europe leading up to the film's commercial release: one in Berlin, Germany on February 4 and the second in London, England on February 7. A Good Day to Die Hard was commercially released first in Indonesia on February 6, 2013, and then opened in certain East and Southeast Asian territories on February 7.

=== Theatrical ===
In the United States and Canada, the film was distributed to 2,328 theaters for night showings on February 13. Select theaters also held a one-time special marathon of all Die Hard films to lead up to A Good Day to Die Hard's nationwide release, with Bruce Willis making a personal appearance at one of these marathons in New York City to thank fans. The film then expanded to a total of 3,553 theaters, including IMAX theaters, on February 14.

=== Home media ===
A Good Day to Die Hard was released on DVD and Blu-ray on June 4, 2013. There is an extended cut that is only available on the Blu-ray version. It features a longer car chase through Moscow and some other slightly extended scenes. It also completely removes Lucy from the film. However, Winstead's name still appears in the end credits despite being cut from this version.

== Reception ==
=== Box office ===
A Good Day to Die Hard grossed $67,349,198 in North America and $237,304,984 in other territories for a worldwide total of $304,654,182.

In North America, A Good Day to Die Hard grossed an estimated $840,000 from its night showings at 2,328 locations on Wednesday, February 13, 2013. The next day, at an additional 1,225 locations, the film managed to accumulate $8,239,116, opening at #2 behind Safe Haven. However, for the whole 4-day Presidents' Day weekend, A Good Day to Die Hard opened in first place with $28,640,657, bringing its total at that point to $36,879,773.

Overseas, A Good Day to Die Hard grossed $10,860,000 in its first weekend. Opening in seven Asian markets at 1,182 locations a week before North America's release (February 6–7) to take advantage of the Chinese New Year holiday, the majority of the film's gross came from South Korea, with the film also setting a Fox record in Indonesia and a series record in Hong Kong.

=== Critical response ===
On Rotten Tomatoes, the film has an approval rating of 15% based on 232 reviews and an average rating of 3.9/10. The site's critical consensus reads, "A Good Day to Die Hard is the weakest entry in a storied franchise, and not even Bruce Willis's smirking demeanor can enliven a clichéd, uninspired script." On Metacritic, the film has a weighted average score of 28 out of 100, based on 41 critics, indicating "generally unfavorable" reviews. On both websites, the film ranked lowest among the Die Hard films. Audiences polled by CinemaScore gave the film an average grade of "B+" on an A+ to F scale, the lowest score of the franchise.

A. O. Scott of The New York Times described A Good Day to Die Hard as "a handful of extended set pieces—each more elaborate and therefore somehow less exciting than the last—linked by a simple-minded plot and a handful of half-clever lines." Though complimenting the special effects, he criticizes the direction of John Moore, the lack of style, and writes that "everything that made the first Die Hard memorable—the nuances of character, the political subtext, the cowboy wit—has been dumbed down or scrubbed away entirely." Todd McCarthy of The Hollywood Reporter expressed similar sentiments, particularly of the direction, for which he says that Moore "has directed these sequences in a way that makes the incidents look so far-fetched and essentially unsurvivable that you can only laugh". Kenneth Turan of the Los Angeles Times gave the film a 2/5 and remarked that it lacked "inspiration", and that the onscreen rivalry of Willis and Courtney was "more irritant than enticement." Richard Roeper, standing in for Roger Ebert on Ebert's website, rated the film one and a half stars out of four, criticizing the implausibility of the action sequences, as well as the film's lack of sufficient characterization for McClane and the villains as compared to the other films in the series. He says that "McClane has been stripped of any real traces of an actual three-dimensional character," and that the film "never giv[es] us a chance to get the least bit involved with any of these characters."

Among the rare positive reviews, Robbie Collin for The Daily Telegraph remarked that "Yet even though the ride finally stalls, A Good Day To Die Hard has been thrustingly outrageous enough in its earlier moments to coast to the finish line on momentum." Daniel M. Kimmel, writing for the New England Movies Weekly, found the film to be better than Live Free or Die Hard and states that the car chase scene "is well worth the price of admission." With a 3.5/5 rating, Kimmel summed up his review saying, "it's probably a good day to end the series at last, but it's an action-packed and entertaining finale." Rick Groen of The Globe and Mail criticized the action scenes as being "messy", but concluded his review saying that the film "continues the franchise without undue embarrassment." Peter Howell of The Toronto Star remarked that Willis and Courtney made a strong estranged family duo and that the film had a nice drinking game routine going for it with how many times McClane exclaims "I'm on vacation!" during the running time.

=== Accolades ===
At the 40th People's Choice Awards, A Good Day to Die Hard received a nomination for Favorite Thriller Movie. It was nominated for Best International Poster, Best Teaser Poster, and Best Pre-Show Theatrical Advertising at the 2013 Golden Trailer Awards.

== Video game ==
The video game adaptation of the film was developed by Goroid and published by Fox Digital Entertainment. It was released on February 14, 2013, for Android and iOS.

== Future ==
=== Cancelled sequel ===
When the production was formally announced for the fifth film in the series, Bruce Willis expressed his desire to retire the John McClane character in a sixth and final film. By September 2017, director Len Wiseman publicly floated that he was casting for a young version of John McClane for his self-penned origin story called John McClane, whose plot was rumored to borrow heavily from the Die Hard: Year One comic book mini-series. Six months later, the studio enlisted duo Chad Hayes and Carey W. Hayes to re-write the screenplay after Bruce Willis refused to endorse the previous edition and its actor.

In July 2018, producer Lorenzo di Bonaventura submitted an updated treatment titled McClane, further confirming that the storyline features elements of McClane's and Holly's characters in the 1970s, intermixed with their present-day counterparts. The following month, Wiseman stated that pre-production on the new film should start "...fairly soon, no dates" once the script has been completed. Tobey Maguire joined the production team late summer 2018. By December 2018, di Bonaventura handed in yet another draft, this time without input from Willis. Production designer Carol Uraneck, who was hired in September 2018, later left the project by the close of the year. In February 2019, the production team made a revision to the writing, insinuating that the project, though supposedly moving forward, is on the studio's backburner, as evinced by executives not even having read the script yet. Actress Mary Elizabeth Winstead said that she would be interested in returning as Lucy Gennero-McClane in a future installment, but later intimated doubt that the film would ever get made due to scheduling conflicts.

Die Hard was removed from the Fox imprint through at least its 2021 slate, after Disney's acquisition and senior management shake-up, which saw the dismissal of its theatrical distribution executive, Chris Aronson.

The production was later cancelled outright in August 2019 after further consideration by Disney.

Willis reprised his role as McClane for the final time in 2020 for an advertisement for the DieHard car battery. Willis later retired from acting in 2022 due to being diagnosed with aphasia, ruling out any future return as McClane.

=== Possible television reboot ===
In lieu of company-wide reorganization, Disney is said to be rebooting the property as a streaming series on Hulu.
