= Die Hard with a Vengeance (soundtrack) =

Die Hard with a Vengeance: Original Motion Picture Soundtrack

Film score by Michael Kamen
- Released: May 16, 1995
- Recorded: April 1995
- Studios: St. Thomas Center, Los Angeles, California; Remote Recording Services, Lahaska, Pennsylvania
- Genre: Film score
- Length: 66:06 (standard); 154:01 (deluxe)
- Labels: RCA Victor; La-La Land
- Producers: Nick Redman; Mike Mattessino

Michael Kamen chronology
Circle of Friends (1995)	Die Hard with a Vengeance (1995)	Stonewall (1995)

Die Hard with a Vengeance: Original Motion Picture Soundtrack is the soundtrack to the 1995 film Die Hard with a Vengeance, the third installment in the Die Hard film series starring Bruce Willis as John McClane. The film is scored by the recurrent composer of the series, Michael Kamen who incorporated his themes from the first two films as well as Johannes Brahms' 1st and Ludwig van Beethoven's 9th symphony. Kamen's work has been positively received and won BMI TV/Film Music Award for his work in the score.

== Release history ==
The score was released by RCA Victor on May 16, 1995, being the only album from the Die Hard series to be released in conjunction with the film. Despite not featuring the complete score, the album consisted of seven cues from Kamen's score, with the songs "Summer in the City" by the Lovin' Spoonful, "Got It Covered" by Fu-Schnickens and "In Front of the Kids" by Extra Prolific also being included. Compositions from classical musicians such as Alexander Mosolov's "Iron Foundry", Brahms' 1st and Beethoven's 9th symphony were incorporated into the score, arranged by Kamen and also included in the album.

On December 7, 2012, La-La Land Records released the complete score album featuring nearly an hour of the film's music as well as alternative cues that were not included in the film score.

== Critical reception ==
Filmtracks.com wrote "Given all of this mess, perhaps it is no surprise that there never has been and probably never will be a truly satisfying album release of music from Die Hard With a Vengeance." Daevid Jehnzen of AllMusic wrote "The soundtrack to the third installment of the Die Hard series features a dynamic, exciting score that accurately conveys the non-stop thrills of the movie." A reviewer from The Ultimate Rabbit wrote "While it may not have the same exhilarating or emotional sweep as his score for Die Hard 2, what Kamen has put together here is great and highly enjoyable to listen to." Simon Brew of Den of Geek wrote "the late, great Michael Kamen’s score is a belter". Matt Rooney of JoBlo.com wrote "As crazy and fast-paced as the movie can be, his music doesn't always take the same path by going for big and bold, but rather gives it a tense undercurrent that can evolve into something that sounds a bit tragic."

== Track listing ==
=== Standard ===
Die Hard with a Vengeance: Original Motion Picture Soundtrack standard track listing
No.	Title	Artist(s)	Length
1.	"Summer in the City"	The Lovin' Spoonful	2:44
2.	"Goodbye Bonwits"		6:28
3.	"Got It Covered"	Fu-Schnickens	4:13
4.	"John and Zeus"		3:19
5.	"In Front of the Kids"	Extra Prolific	2:44
6.	"Papaya King"		5:20
7.	"Take A-Nother Train"		2:55
8.	"The Iron Foundry"	Alexander Mosolov	3:08
9.	"Waltz Of The Bankers"		4:13
10.	"Gold Vault"		3:45
11.	"Surfing In The Aquaduct"		2:30
12.	"Brahms: Symphony No. 1 (4th Movement)"	Johannes Brahms	15:00
13.	"Beethoven: Symphony No. 9 (4th Movement)"	Ludwig van Beethoven	9:47
Total length:			66:06

=== Deluxe edition ===
Die Hard with a Vengeance: Original Motion Picture Soundtrack deluxe disc one track listing
No.	Title	Length
1.	"Summer in the City" (performed by The Lovin' Spoonful)	2:44
2.	"Main Title"	0:19
3.	"Goodbye Bonwits"	6:28
4.	"John and Zeus"	3:20
5.	"Taxi"	1:51
6.	"Neat Bomb"	2:11
7.	"Papaya King"	5:19
8.	"72nd Street Phone"	3:18
9.	"Taxi Chase"	5:08
10.	"The Subway (Part 1)"	4:24
11.	"The Subway (Part 2)"	2:15
12.	"Take A-nother Train"	2:54
13.	"Feds"	4:42
14.	"Rings a Bell"	8:28
15.	"Infiltration"	5:33
16.	"Bank Invasion"	4:15
17.	"Back to Wall Street"	2:55
18.	"Fake Cops"	1:42
19.	"The Federal Reserve"	2:18
20.	"Bank Elevator"	2:54
21.	"Gold Room Aftermath"	1:36
22.	"Panic"	2:04
Total length:		76:38

Die Hard with a Vengeance: Original Motion Picture Soundtrack deluxe disc two track listing
No.	Title	Length
1.	"Aqueduct"	2:12
2.	"Santa Claus"	2:36
3.	"Yankee Stadium / School and Tunnel"	3:42
4.	"Refrigerator Bomb"	0:40
5.	"Surfing in the Aqueduct"	2:29
6.	"Ticking Refrigerator"	0:50
7.	"Mercedes Chase / School Assembly"	3:14
8.	"Aftermath / Waiting and Falling"	2:00
9.	"Hooking the Boat"	5:45
10.	"Bunny and Fire Drill"	2:39
11.	"Running in the Halls"	1:42
12.	"Bomb Goes Into Hold"	5:24
13.	"John Makes It Mad"	1:39
14.	"Holly / Celebration"	3:17
15.	"Oh, Canada!"	3:23
16.	"When Johnny Comes Marching Home"	1:39
17.	"Regret"	1:57
18.	"Hooking the Boat" (alternate)	4:23
19.	"On the Freighter / John Makes It Mad"	3:30
20.	"Wall Street Station"	1:29
21.	"The Subway (Part 1)" (alt. segment)	1:31
22.	"The Subway (Part 2)" (alt. segment)	0:47
23.	"Ode to Johnny"	3:12
24.	"No Rush"	1:20
25.	"Escape"	2:05
26.	"The Foundry"	3:08
27.	"Waltz of the Bankers" (album track)	4:15
28.	"Gold Vault" (album track)	3:50
29.	"Somebody Had Fun (wild snare)"	1:16
30.	"When Johnny Comes Marching Home (wild vamps)"	1:29
Total length:		77:23

== Personnel ==
- Music composer, arranger and conductor – Michael Kamen
- Producer – Mike Matessino, Nick Redman
- Orchestra – Seattle Symphony Orchestra
- Orchestration – Bruce Babcock
- Engineer – Al Swanson, Andrew Warwick, David Hewitt, David Roberts, Joel Iwataki, Lee Manning, Phil Gitomer, Sean McClintock
- Recording and mixing – Stephen McLaughlin
- Mastering – Mike Matessino
- Music editor – Christopher Brooks, Eric Reasoner
- Art direction – Jim Titus
