= Hans Gruber =

Fictional character from Die Hard

- Die Hard character
- Alan Rickman as Hans Gruber in Die Hard
- First appearance: Die Hard; 1988
- Last appearance: Die Hard: Nakatomi Plaza; 2002
- Created by: Jeb Stuart; Steven E. de Souza
- Based on: Anton Gruber by Roderick Thorp
- Portrayed by: Alan Rickman

In-universe information
- Alias: Bill Clay
- Occupation: Criminal
- Affiliation: Volksfrei Movement (based on Red Army Faction) (formerly)
- Weapon: Heckler & Koch P7
- Family: Simon Gruber (brother)
- Children: Piet Gruber (son)
- Nationality: West German

Hans Gruber is a fictional character and the main villain of the 1988 action movie Die Hard. He is portrayed by Alan Rickman.

Gruber is a thief and criminal mastermind from West Germany who holds an office building hostage to steal $640 million in negotiable bearer bonds. His plan is foiled by New York police officer John McClane (played by Bruce Willis).

Gruber is considered one of the most iconic villains in film history, and the character has influenced many subsequent film villains. The character was Rickman's first film role.

== Production ==
Die Hard was adapted from Roderick Thorp's 1979 thriller Nothing Lasts Forever, and the character Anton Gruber is the basis for the film villain. Screenwriter Steven E. de Souza wrote the screenplay with the mindset of Gruber being the protagonist.

Gruber was Alan Rickman's first film role, and he was cast after producer Joel Silver saw him during a Broadway run of Les Liaisons Dangereuses. Rickman was initially reluctant to take the role; once cast, Rickman made suggestions about the character to Silver, such as Gruber wearing a suit rather than terrorist garb. Gruber was conceived as a mercenary, and Rickman's casting required the filmmakers to re-think the character and make on-set rewrites. One such addition is the scene in which Gruber pretends to be an escaped hostage, which was added when the production crew discovered Rickman could speak with a convincing American accent. Rickman did not see Gruber as a villain, saying he was "just playing someone who wants certain things in life, has made certain choices, and goes after them." Rickman was nervous filming scenes in which Gruber fires a gun.

A blue screen effect was used for Gruber's death scene, compositing the shot of Rickman falling about 20 feet (6.1 m) against a background plate of the plaza surrounding the building. According to visual effects supervisor Richard Edlund, director John McTiernan had to convince Rickman to perform the stunt. They recorded the fall twice and used the first take. Edlund said Rickman's look of fear is genuine: even though he knew he would be dropped, the fall was still frightening. Some accounts state Rickman was dropped a few seconds sooner than he anticipated, intensifying the look of fear and surprise on the actor's face.

== Reception and legacy ==
Gruber was Rickman's breakthrough role, and Die Hard's success "imbued overnight fame." People pointed out the layers of Rickman's portrayal: "an Englishman playing a German who spends a not-insignificant part of his screen time speaking with an American accent." People also highlighted Gruber beginning the film "totally in control" and Rickman's chemistry with co-star Bruce Willis. The New Yorker described Gruber as "oddly contained, seemingly bored by the very mayhem he's set in motion." Screen Rant called the character's death scene "one of the most memorable movie villain demise[s] of all time."

Maxim said Gruber was a reinvention of modern villains, replacing one-dimensional Russians and Nazis as the Cold War was ending. Vanity Fair said audiences rooted for Gruber and that the character "may have been the last [Hollywood villain] to fully seduce us." The New Yorker described Rickman as a "prototypical" and "impossible-to-replicate" villain. Den of Geek states Gruber's plan is the reason the movie exists:

[D]espite Bruce Willis' mug and name being on the poster, Hans Gruber is the reason why this story exists – if he hadn't turned up at Nakatomi Plaza, the movie wouldn't exist – all the other characters exist as reactors to his actions.

Gruber would influence subsequent "Hollywood Euro-villain"s, and his "calculating malevolence" impacted the villains in Executive Decision (1996), Air Force One (1997), and Face/Off (1997). Like Gruber, the villain in Cliffhanger (1993) is a former political idealist who is instead trying to steal money.

Gruber has become one of the most iconic cinematic villains. Empire ranked Gruber fourth on their list of the Greatest Movie Villains of All Time, beaten by Darth Vader, The Joker and Loki. Empire cited his "most perfect combination of voice and face put to screen for a villain," and pointed to Rickman's theatrical training for the character's precision and weight. Empire also listed Gruber as the 17th Greatest Movie Character of All Time. American Film Institute ranked Gruber 46th on AFI's 100 Years...100 Heroes & Villains and IGN listed Gruber 14th of their top 100 villains.
