= Die Hard: Year One =

Comic book limited series

Publication information
- Publisher: Boom! Studios
- Schedule: Monthly
- Format: Limited series
- Genre: Science fiction
- Publication date: September 30, 2009 – April 12, 2010
- No. of issues: 8
- Main character: John McClane

Creative team
- Written by: Howard Chaykin
- Artist: Stephen Thompson

Die Hard: Year One is an eight-issue comic book limited series which serves as a prequel to the film Die Hard and was published by Boom! Studios and written by Howard Chaykin. There were 8 comic issues produced in the series between September 2009 and April 2010. Its story is set in 1976 and follows John McClane as a rookie cop in the NYPD.

A film adaptation has been in development hell since 2017.

== Description ==
Every great action hero got started somewhere. Batman Begins. Bond had his Casino Royale. And for John McClane, twelve years before the first Die Hard movie, he's just another rookie cop, an East Coast guy working on earning his badge in New York City during 1976's Bicentennial celebration... and the Summer of Sam. Too bad for John McClane, nothing's ever that easy.

== Reception ==
Die Hard: Year One received mixed reviews from critics scoring an average rating of 6.1 for the entire series based on 11 critic reviews aggregated by Comic Book Roundup.

== Cancelled film adaptation ==
In September 2017, Len Wiseman stated that he was casting for a young version of John McClane for an origin film called John McClane, adapting the events of Die Hard: Year One.

In March 2018, writing duo Chad Hayes and Carey W. Hayes were enlisted by 20th Century Fox to re-write the screenplay after Bruce Willis refused to endorse the previous edition and its actor. In July, producer Lorenzo di Bonaventura submitted an updated treatment titled McClane, further confirming that the storyline features elements of McClane's and Holly's characters in the 1970s, intermixed with their present-day counterparts. The following month, Wiseman said that pre-production on the new film should start "...fairly soon, no dates" once the script has been completed. Tobey Maguire joined the production team late Summer. By December, di Bonaventura handed in yet another draft, this time without input from Willis. Production designer Carol Uraneck, who was hired that September, later left the project by the close of the year.

In February 2019, the production team made a revision to the writing, insinuating that the project, though supposedly moving forward, was on the studio's backburner, as evidenced by executives not even having read the script yet. Actress Mary Elizabeth Winstead said that she was interested in returning as Lucy Gennero-McClane in a future installment, but later intimated doubt that the film would ever get made, due to scheduling.

Die Hard was removed from the Fox imprint through at least its 2021 slate, after Disney's acquisition and senior management shake-up, which saw the dismissal of its theatrical distribution executive, Chris Aronson. The production was later cancelled outright in August 2019 after further consideration by Disney. In lieu of the reorganization of both companies, the media giant is said to be rebooting development of McClane for streaming as a television series.

In March 2022 it was announced that Bruce Willis was retiring from acting following a diagnosis of aphasia, ending all production on any form of the prequel/sequel McClane with his involvement.

== See also ==
- List of comics based on films
