= Die Hard (soundtrack) =

Die Hard: Original Motion Picture Soundtrack

Film score by Michael Kamen
- Released: February 2002 (original release); November 29, 2011 and March 31, 2017 (reissues); November 5, 2018 (remastered edition)
- Recorded: 1987–1988
- Studios: Twentieth Century Fox Studios, Los Angeles
- Genres: Electronic; rock; heavy metal
- Length: 77:04 (original release); 106:10 (2011 and 2017 reissues); 182:34 (remastered edition)
- Labels: Varese Sarabande; La-La Land Records
- Producer: Michael Kamen

Michael Kamen chronology
Someone to Watch Over Me (1987)	Die Hard (1988)	The Raggedy Rawney (1988)

Die Hard: Original Motion Picture Soundtrack is the film score for John McTiernan's 1988 action film Die Hard starring Bruce Willis, that features an original score composed and conducted by Michael Kamen and performed by the Hollywood Studio Symphony and incorporates diegetic music pieces. It has been critically acclaimed and assessed as one of Kamen's best works in film music and won him a BMI TV/Film Music Award for his work on the score.

The album was not officially released alongside the film, until 2002, when Varèse Sarabande issued a 21-track album featuring Kamen's score. It was then reissued in November 2011 by La-La Land Records, that consisted the full score packed into a two-disc set into a limited edition of 3,500 units, and again reissued in March 2017 of over 2,000 units.

In November 2018, La-La Land Records released Die Hard: 30th Anniversary Remastered Edition featuring additional cues and demos, and sold over 5,000 units.

== Background ==
Kamen initially saw a mostly incomplete version of Die Hard and was unimpressed, as he saw the film as primarily about a "phenomenal bad guy" who made McClane seem less important. He was initially dismissive of film scores, believing they could not stand alone from the film, until he agreed to do so. His original score incorporates pizzicato and arco strings, brass, woodwinds and sleigh bells added during moments of menace to counter their festive meaning.

The score incorporates diegetic music, which includes the Beethoven's 9th Symphony (commonly known as "Ode to Joy") and the classical piece of Brandenburg Concerto No. 3 by Johann Sebastian Bach, along with film score cues include James Horner's unused score for Aliens (1986) and cues from Man on Fire (1987). The score further references "Let It Snow! Let It Snow! Let It Snow!", "Singin' in the Rain" (1952), "Winter Wonderland" (1934), and "Christmas in Hollis" by Run-DMC, which would go on to be considered a Christmas classic, in part because of its use in the film.

== Original release ==
The album was first issued in February 2002 by Varèse Sarabande. It featured only 21 tracks that are heard from the film's score, including an instrumental arrangement of Jule Styne and Sammy Cahn's song "Let It Snow! Let It Snow! Let It Snow!". The rest of the score is not being included.

Track listing
No.	Title	Length
1.	"The Nakatomi Plaza"	1:50
2.	"Gruber's Arrival"	3:40
3.	"John's Escape / You Want Money?"	5:52
4.	"The Tower"	1:49
5.	"The Roof"	3:57
6.	"The Fight"	1:07
7.	"He Won't Be Joining Us"	3:53
8.	"And If He Alters It?"	2:39
9.	"Going After John Again"	4:33
10.	"Have A Few Laughs"	3:29
11.	"Welcome to the Party"	1:00
12.	"TV Station / His Bag is Missing"	3:52
13.	"Assault on the Tower"	8:16
14.	"John Is Found Out"	5:03
15.	"Attention Police"	3:38
16.	"Bill Clay"	2:02
17.	"I Had An Accident"	2:37
18.	"Ode To Joy"	3:36
19.	"The Battle"	10:15
20.	"Gruber's Departure"	1:56
21.	"Let It Snow! Let It Snow! Let It Snow! (Instrumental Version)"	2:00
Total length:		77:04

== Reissues ==
=== 2011 reissue ===
La-La Land Records reissued and released the full score album on November 29, 2011, in a two-disc set. The album featured 39 tracks that included the score cues and few musical references heard in the film. The bonus tracks included variations of the score, that are either alternates or mono sources of the existing cues.

Disc 1
No.	Title	Length
1.	"Main Title (Mono Source)"	0:38
2.	"Terrorist Entrance"	4:05
3.	"The Phone Goes Dead / Party Crashers"	1:51
4.	"John's Escape / You Want Money"	6:00
5.	"Wiring the Roof"	1:51
6.	"Fire Alarm"	2:04
7.	"Tony Approaches"	1:41
8.	"Tony and John Fight"	1:11
9.	"Santa"	0:55
10.	"He Won't Be Joining Us"	3:01
11.	"And If He Alters It"	2:39
12.	"Going After John"	4:29
13.	"Have A Few Laughs / Al Powell Approaches"	3:31
14.	"Under the Table"	1:55
15.	"Welcome to the Party"	1:09
16.	"TV Station"	2:47
17.	"Holly Meets Hans"	1:19
18.	"Assault On the Tower"	8:35
Total length:		49:41

Disc 2
No.	Title	Length
19.	"John Is Found Out"	5:03
20.	"Attention Police"	3:54
21.	"Bill Clay"	4:09
22.	"Shooting the Glass"	1:05
23.	"I Had an Accident"	2:37
24.	"The Vault"	3:07
25.	"Message for Holly"	1:07
26.	"The Battle / Freeing the Hostages"	6:53
27.	"Helicopter Explosion and Showdown"	4:00
28.	"Happy Trails"	1:12
29.	"We've Got Each Other" (John Scott)	1:56
30.	"Let It Snow" (Vaughn Monroe)	1:43
31.	"Beethoven's 9th (End Credits Excerpt)" (Ludwig van Beethoven)	3:54
Total length:		40:40

Bonus tracks
No.	Title	Length
32.	"The Nakatomi Plaza"	1:45
33.	"Message for Holly (Film Version, mono source)"	2:46
34.	"Gun in Cheek (mono source)"	1:01
35.	"Fire House (mono source)"	1:00
36.	"Ode to Joy (Alternate)"	2:10
37.	"Let It Snow (Source)" (Michael Kamen)	1:58
38.	"Winter Wonderland (Source)"	0:20
39.	"Christmas in Hollis" (Run-DMC)	4:49
Total length:		15:49

=== 2017 reissue ===
The album was again reissued by La-La Land Records and released on March 31, 2017.

== 30th Anniversary Remastered Edition ==
In 2018, coinciding with the 30th anniversary of the film's release, a remastered edition of Kamen's score was announced by La-La Land Records and set for release on November 5, 2018, in a three-disc set that contains 74 tracks. The album featured the full score, including cues and existing pieces of diegetic music referenced in the film, while multiple variations of the score which includes, source music, alternatives and mixes heard in the film being included in the album. It also included previously unreleased material from Kamen's score in full or partially heard in existing cues.

Disc 1
No.	Title	Length
1.	"Main Title"	0:43
2.	"Seeing Holly"	1:07
3.	"Terrorist Entrance"	4:06
4.	"The Phone Goes Dead / Party Crashers"	1:53
5.	"John's Escape / You Want Money"	6:01
6.	"The Nakatomi Plaza (Takagi's Death)"	1:45
7.	"Wiring The Roof"	1:51
8.	"Approaching The Vault^{[a]}"	0:48
9.	"Fire Alarm"	2:04
10.	"Tony Approaches"	1:42
11.	"Tony And John Fight"	1:13
12.	"Santa"	0:57
13.	"He Won't Be Joining Us"	3:02
14.	"And If He Alters It"	2:40
15.	"Going After John"	4:32
16.	"Have A Few Laughs / Al Powell Approaches"	3:32
17.	"Under The Table"	1:59
18.	"Welcome To The Party"	1:10
19.	"Yippee Ki-Yay^{[b]}"	0:45
20.	"Holly Meets Hans"	1:20
21.	"Assault On The Tower"	8:34
22.	"John Is Found Out"	5:04
23.	"Attention Police"	3:54
24.	"Bill Clay"	4:09
25.	"Shoot The Glass^{[b]}"	2:20
26.	"I Had An Accident (Extended Version)^{[b]}"	2:56
Total length:		70:07

Disc 2
No.	Title	Length
27.	"The Vault (Film Edit)"	3:07
28.	"Message For Holly (Film Edit)^{[b]}"	3:13
29.	"Gun In Cheek (Extended Version)^{[b]}"	1:20
30.	"The Battle / Freeing The Hostages"	6:53
31.	"The Fire Hose^{[b]}"	1:24
32.	"Helicopter Explosion And Showdown"	4:02
33.	"Happy Trails, Hans^{[a]}"	1:42
34.	"Aftermath – Powell's Comeback^{[a]}"	2:52
35.	"Let It Snow (Vaughn Monroe)"	1:44
36.	"Beethoven's 9th (End Credit Excerpt)"	3:53
37.	"Main Title (Alternate)^{[a]}"	0:40
38.	"The Nakatomi Plaza (Takagi's Death) (Alternate)^{[a]}"	1:47
39.	"Approaching The Vault (Alternates)^{[a]}"	2:33
40.	"Tony Approaches (Alternate)^{[a]}"	1:43
41.	"Yippee Ki-Yay (Extended Version)"	2:48
42.	"Assault On The Tower (Alternate Excerpts)^{[a]}"	3:44
43.	"Attention Police (Pick Up Opening)^{[a]}"	2:04
44.	"The Vault (Alternate)^{[a]}"	2:52
45.	"The Vault (Alternate Performance)"	2:11
46.	"Message For Holly (Original Version)^{[b]}"	2:52
47.	"Message For Holly (Revised Version)^{[b]}"	2:58
48.	"Happy Trails (Tracked Film Edit)"	1:13
49.	"We've Got Each Other" (From the movie Man On Fire; written by John Patrick Scott)	1:56
50.	"Resolution and Hyperspace (Excerpt)" (From the movie Aliens; James Horner)	2:47
51.	"Wild Percussion^{[a]}"	2:16
52.	"Roy Rogers Meets Beethoven's 9th (Source)"	1:33
53.	"Winter Wonderland (Source)" (written by Felix Bernard and Dick Smith)	1:26
54.	"Let It Snow (Source)" (Performed by Michael Kamen; Written by Sammy Cahn and Jule Styne)	1:58
55.	"Christmas In Hollis" (RUN-DMC)	2:58
Total length:		72:29

Disc 3
No.	Title	Length
56.	"Main Title (Film Edit)"	0:36
57.	"Seeing Holly (Film Mix)"	1:05
58.	"The Phone Goes Dead / Party Crashers (Extended Opening)^{[b]}"	2:22
59.	"The Nakatomi Plaza (Takagi's Death) (Orchestra Only)"	1:47
60.	"Wiring The Roof (Film Mix Excerpt)"	0:58
61.	"Tony Approaches (Film Mix)"	1:44
62.	"Going After John (Film Mix)"	4:33
63.	"Al Powell Approaches (Film Mix)"	2:32
64.	"Al Powell Approaches (Alternate)^{[a]}"	2:37
65.	"Under The Table (His Bag Is Missing) (Film Edit)"	1:25
66.	"John Is Found Out (Film Mix)"	5:54
67.	"Bill Clay Pt. 1 (Film Mix)"	2:08
68.	"Bill Clay Pt. 2 (Extended)^{[b]}"	2:08
69.	"Shooting The Glass"	1:08
70.	"Message For Holly (Original Version) (Orchestra Only)^{[b]}"	2:53
71.	"The Battle (Alternate Excerpt)^{[b]}"	1:19
72.	"Wild Take^{[a]}"	1:29
73.	"Roy Rogers Meets Beethoven's Ninth (Alternate)^{[a]}"	1:36
74.	"Hip Hop Christmas (Source)^{[a]}"	1:44
Total length:		39:58

Notes

- ^{^a} Previously unreleased
- ^{^b} Contains originally unreleased material

== Reception ==
Robert Lockard of the Deja Reviewer mentioned "The music in Die Hard is adequate, but it's nothing special. It's ironic for a film that took so many chances and got so much right to go so middle-of-the-road with its soundtrack." Mfiles wrote "It's a rare action score that blends sincerity and self-parody in a manner that never compromises its respective movie, although one suspects McTiernan dialled down some of Kamen's more eccentric flourishes for that very reason ... This review is a testament not only to a great Christmas movie and score, but also to both of their formidable legacies." James Southall of Movie Wave wrote "it's easy to see why it came about – Die Hard in particular is a fearsomely complex work that (somewhat against the odds, for reasons explained later) works simply brilliantly in the film and became one of the most influential scores of its time."

Jonathan Broxton believed Die Hard to be one of Kamen's best action music compositions. He praised "the clever combination of the themes, the interpolation of the classical music and the songs, and the rich and vivid action set pieces". Broxton summarised it as "an iconic 1980s action score which demands attention." Neil Shurley of AllMusic called it as an "outstanding presentation of a seminal score". Soundtrack Beat wrote "Kamen's score masterfully builds suspense, propelling all the plot's high-octane action while enriching the characterizations."

Filmtracks.com wrote "Kamen's score is defined by a series of repeated, pseudo- Western and pseudo-oriental riffs on acoustic guitar and lightly jingling bells representing the holidays ... Kamen's music for Die Hard doesn't translate well onto album ... Only once the party really begins, and the Plaza is under siege by the ineffectual police and FBI force, does Kamen's score begin to hold its own. The same applies to the score's revisitation of that mode in its end credits ... the weak early and middle portions of the Die Hard score function to basic degrees in the film, sometimes as mere sound effects, and the movie might have succeeded just as well with outright parody adaptations of Christmas carols."

== Personnel ==
- Michael Kamen – composer, conductor
- Daniel Hersch – music editor, mastering
- Robert Townson – executive producer
- Armin Steiner – mixing
- The Hollywood Studio Symphony – orchestra
- Bruce Babcock – orchestration
- Chris Boardman – orchestration
- Fi Trench – orchestration
- Philip Giffin – orchestration
- Nick Redman – album producer
- Stephen McLaughlin – music producer
- Christopher Brooks – supervising music editor
- Michael McDonald – music transfers
