= Live Free or Die Hard =

2007 American action film directed by Len Wiseman

- Theatrical release poster
- Directed by: Len Wiseman
- Screenplay by: Mark Bomback
- Story by: Mark Bomback; David Marconi
- Based on: "A Farewell to Arms" by John Carlin; Characters by Roderick Thorp
- Produced by: Michael Fottrell
- Starring: Bruce Willis; Justin Long; Timothy Olyphant; Cliff Curtis; Maggie Q
- Cinematography: Simon Duggan
- Edited by: Nicolas De Toth
- Music by: Marco Beltrami
- Production companies: Cheyenne Enterprises; Dune Entertainment; Ingenious Film Partners
- Distributed by: 20th Century Fox
- Release dates: June 12, 2007 (Tokyo); June 27, 2007 (United States)
- Running time: 129 minutes
- Country: United States
- Language: English
- Budget: $110 million
- Box office: $388.2 million

Live Free or Die Hard (released as Die Hard 4.0 outside North America) is a 2007 American action thriller film directed by Len Wiseman. It is the sequel to Die Hard with a Vengeance (1995) and the fourth installment in the Die Hard film series. It is based on the 1997 article "A Farewell to Arms" written for Wired magazine by John Carlin. The film's name references New Hampshire's state motto, "Live Free or Die".

In the film, NYPD Detective John McClane (Bruce Willis) attempts to stop a cyber-terrorist, Thomas Gabriel (Timothy Olyphant) who hacks into government and commercial computers across the United States with the goal of starting a "fire sale" cyber attack that would disable key elements of the nation's infrastructure. Justin Long, Cliff Curtis, Maggie Q, Mary Elizabeth Winstead and Kevin Smith also star.

Live Free or Die Hard was released in the United States on June 27, 2007 by 20th Century Fox. The film grossed $388 million worldwide, making it the highest-grossing installment in the Die Hard series. It received positive reviews from critics. It is the only Die Hard film to be theatrically released with a PG-13 rating from the MPAA, although an unrated edition would later be made available on home media. A fifth film, A Good Day to Die Hard, was released in 2013.

== Plot ==
In response to a brief blackout at the FBI Cyber Division headquarters, FBI Deputy Director Miguel Bowman asks local law enforcement to bring in high-level computer hackers nationwide. NYPD Police Detective John McClane is assigned to pick up hacker Matt Farrell in New Jersey. After McClane arrives at Farrell's residence, assassins sent by Thomas Gabriel, a hacker and leader of cyberterrorists, attack them. McClane and Farrell manage to escape.

As McClane and Farrell travel to Washington D.C., Farrell tells McClane he had written an algorithm for Mai Linh (Gabriel's girlfriend and co-conspirator) to crack a specific security system; he believed his work was being used for white hat purposes. Meanwhile, Gabriel orders his crew of hackers to take over transportation grids and the stock market while nationally broadcasting a threatening message to the U.S. government. Farrell realizes this is a "fire sale", a cyber attack designed to disable the nation's infrastructure. As McClane and Farrell are driven to DHS headquarters, Linh—posing as a dispatcher—reroutes them into a helicopter ambush. McClane fends off the attackers and destroys the helicopter.

McClane asks Farrell what he thinks Gabriel's next move will be. Farrell deduces that Gabriel's next target will be the power grid. The two drive to a utility superstation in West Virginia and find it under the control of a team led by Linh. McClane and Farrell kill Linh's team. After a struggle, Linh and McClane end up in a vehicle that is stuck in an elevator shaft. McClane climbs out of the vehicle and escapes, but the vehicle falls to the bottom of the elevator shaft and explodes, killing Linh.

Farrell traces Gabriel and uploads his picture to Bowman, who learns that Gabriel has orchestrated the fire sale. McClane learns from Bowman that Gabriel once worked for the DOD as chief programmer. Gabriel warned the department about weaknesses that made America's network infrastructure vulnerable to cyberwarfare, but he was ignored and later fired for his unorthodox methods, so he is seeking revenge. Enraged over Linh's death, Gabriel redirects natural gas to the superstation and causes an explosion in another attempt to kill McClane and Farrell. The two barely escape, but the destruction of the facility causes a massive blackout throughout the Eastern Seaboard.

McClane and Farrell travel by helicopter to the home of super hacker Frederick "Warlock" Kaludis in Baltimore. Warlock identifies the piece of code Farrell wrote for Linh as a means to access data at a Social Security Administration building at Woodlawn, Maryland. Doing a traceroute, Warlock locates Gabriel; he is at Woodlawn. McClane, Farrell, and Bowman discover that Woodlawn is actually an NSA facility intended to back up the nation's personal and financial records as a failsafe in the event of a cyber attack; it was designed by Gabriel himself. The blackout on the FBI was intended to trigger the download of the financial data to Woodlawn, and Gabriel plans to steal the data. Meanwhile, Gabriel orchestrates the kidnapping of McClane's estranged daughter, Lucy as a bargaining chip to threaten McClane.

McClane and Farrell race to Woodlawn. The two are separated during the infiltration; Farrell finds the facility's main server and encrypts the data Gabriel's men downloaded before getting captured; and McClane kills more of Gabriel's men. Gabriel flees the building, taking Farrell and Lucy with him. McClane pursues them, hijacking their semi mobile base. Accessing the communication system of an F-35B Lightning II, Gabriel orders the pilot to attack the truck McClane is driving, but the jet is destroyed by falling debris. McClane survives the attack and sees Gabriel's vehicle pull into a nearby hangar.

At the hangar, Gabriel demands that Farrell decrypt the financial data from Woodlawn. When he refuses, Gabriel shoots him in the leg and threatens to kill Lucy. McClane arrives and kills two more of Gabriel's men, but is shot and wounded by Gabriel's last man, Emerson. Gabriel positions himself behind McClane, putting the barrel of the gun in his shoulder wound. McClane then pulls the trigger. The bullet travels through McClane's shoulder and hits Gabriel in the heart, killing him instantly. Farrell then grabs a pistol and kills Emerson as the FBI arrives. Afterward, McClane thanks Farrell for saving Lucy's life.

== Cast ==
- Bruce Willis as John McClane. He becomes involved in stopping Thomas Gabriel after being tasked with transporting Matt Farrell to the FBI for questioning. He saves Farrell from a hit squad and the two work together to stop Gabriel's plan.
- Justin Long as Matthew "Matt" Farrell, a hacker-turned-white hat who now designs cyber-security algorithms. He unknowingly helped Thomas Gabriel with his plan and survives an assassination attempt with McClane's help. He uses his computer expertise to help McClane stop Gabriel's plan.
- Timothy Olyphant as Thomas Gabriel, a crazed former U.S. Department of Defense analyst who leads a group of cyber-terrorists systematically shutting down the entire U.S. infrastructure. Olyphant filmed his role within three weeks.
- Mary Elizabeth Winstead as Lucy Gennero-McClane, McClane's estranged daughter. The inclusion of McClane's daughter was previously considered for the third film, and she was in the video game Die Hard: Vendetta.
- Maggie Q as Mai Linh, Gabriel's second-in-command and lover. She is an expert in both computers and martial arts.
- Kevin Smith as Frederick "Warlock" Kaludis, a hacker who reluctantly helps McClane and Farrell track down Gabriel. Smith made uncredited rewrites to the scenes in which he appears.
- Cliff Curtis as Miguel Bowman, deputy director of the FBI Cyber Security Division.
- Jonathan Sadowski as Trey, Gabriel's main hacker
- Željko Ivanek as Special Agent Molina, Assistant Deputy Director of the FBI Cyber Security Division.
- Christina Chang as Taylor, an FBI Cyber Security Division analyst.

Additional characters include Gabriel's henchmen: Edoardo Costa as Emerson, Cyril Raffaelli as Rand, Yorgo Constantine as Russo, Chris Palmero as Del, Andrew Friedman as Casper and Bryon Weiss as Robinson.

Other actors include Chris Ellis as Lt. Jack Sclavino, McClane's superior; Sung Kang as Raj, an FBI desk officer; Matt O'Leary as Clay Wheeler, an ill-fated hacker; Jake McDorman as Jim, Lucy's boyfriend; Tim Russ as DHS agent Chuck Summer, Joe Gerety as NSA agent Jack Parry, Yancey Arias as FBI agent Johnson, and Rosemary Knower as Mrs. Kaludis, Frederick's mother. Director Len Wiseman makes a cameo appearance as an F-35B pilot, and as the voice of a Camden, New Jersey police captain. Future director of the John Wick franchise Chad Stahelski acted as a stunt performer.

== Production ==
=== Unproduced Die Hard 4: Tears of the Sun sequel ===
After the success of Die Hard with a Vengeance, 20th Century Fox began working on a fourth film. In 1997, they purchased a script entitled Tears of the Sun, written by Alan B. McElroy. The script was about a group of people who go to set up a radio relay station deep inside the Amazon jungle, but due to a severe storm, they land in a small mining town where they hire a guide. However, they are soon captured by a drug lord and his gang, who force them to work as slaves in his mine. They manage to escape and have to survive both the jungle and drug dealers who are chasing them.

At the time Fox decided to rework the story into Die Hard 4, Tears of the Sun had been in development since the early 1990s. Around 1994, it was one of several projects to which John Woo was attached as a director, but which never got made. Along with McElroy, other writers who worked on the script included Ronald Bass, Chris Gerolmo, Larry Ferguson, Robert Mark Kamen and Joel Gross. It was also at one point considered to be re-written into a new modern adaptation of Tarzan, before Fox got the script.

Willis liked the Tears of the Sun title so much that he requested that one of his films, made in 2002, be re-titled Tears of the Sun (instead of Hostile Rescue or Man of War) in exchange for starring in another Die Hard film. This is why it is often mistakenly reported that Tears of the Sun was originally going to be the fourth Die Hard film.

=== Script and title ===
The film's plot is based on an earlier script entitled WW3.com by David Marconi, screenwriter of the 1998 film Enemy of the State. Using John Carlin's Wired magazine article entitled "A Farewell to Arms", Marconi crafted a screenplay about a cyber-terrorist attack on the United States. The fictional attack concept is called "fire sale" in the movie, depicting a three-stage coordinated attack on a country's transportation, telecommunications, financial, and utilities infrastructure systems. After the September 11, 2001 attacks, the project was stalled, only to be resurrected several years later and rewritten into Live Free or Die Hard by Doug Richardson and eventually by Mark Bomback.

Willis said in 2005 that the film would be called Die Hard 4.0, as it revolves around computers and cyber-terrorism. IGN later reported the film was to be called Die Hard: Reset instead. 20th Century Fox later announced the title as Live Free or Die Hard and set a release date of June 29, 2007 with filming to begin in September 2006. The title is based on New Hampshire's state motto, "Live Free or Die", which is attributed to a quote from General John Stark. International trailers use the Die Hard 4.0 title, as the film was released outside North America with that title. Early into the film's DVD commentary, both Wiseman and Willis note a preference for the title Die Hard 4.0.

=== Visual effects ===
For the visual effects used throughout the film, actor Bruce Willis and director Len Wiseman stated that they wanted to use a limited amount of computer-generated imagery (CGI). One VFX producer said that "Len was insisting on the fact that, because we've got Transformers and other big CGI movies coming out, this one has to feel more real. It has to be embedded in some kind of practical reality in order to give it that edge of being a Die Hard." Companies such as Rhythm & Hues Studios (R&H), The Orphanage, R!ot, Pixel Magic, and Amalgamated Pixels assisted in the film's visual effects.

R&H worked on 200 visual effects shots in the film, including the sequence that shows characters John McClane and Matt Farrell crouching between two cars as another car lands on top of the other cars. To achieve this effect, a crane yanked the car and threw it in the air onto the two cars that were also being pulled by cables. The shot was completed when the two characters were integrated into the footage of the car stunt after the lighting was adjusted and CGI glass and debris were added. In the same sequence, John McClane destroys a helicopter that several of Gabriel's henchman are riding in by ramming it with a car. This was accomplished by first filming one take where one of Gabriel's henchman, Rand, jumps from the helicopter, and in the next take the car is propelled into the stationary helicopter as it is hoisted by wires. The final view of the shot overlays the two takes, with added CGI for the debris and moving rotor blades. The company also assisted in adding cars for traffic collisions and masses of people for evacuations from several government buildings.

The Orphanage developed a multi-level freeway interchange for use in one of the film's final scenes by creating a digital environment and a 1,000-foot (300 m) long spiral ramp that was built in front of a bluescreen. When a F-35 jet is pursuing McClane on the freeway, a miniature model and a full-size prop were both built to assist in digitally adding the jet into the scene. The nine-foot model was constructed from November 2006 through February 2007. When the jet is shown hovering near the freeway, editors used the software 3D graphics program Maya to blur the background and create a heat ripple effect.

=== Filming and injuries ===
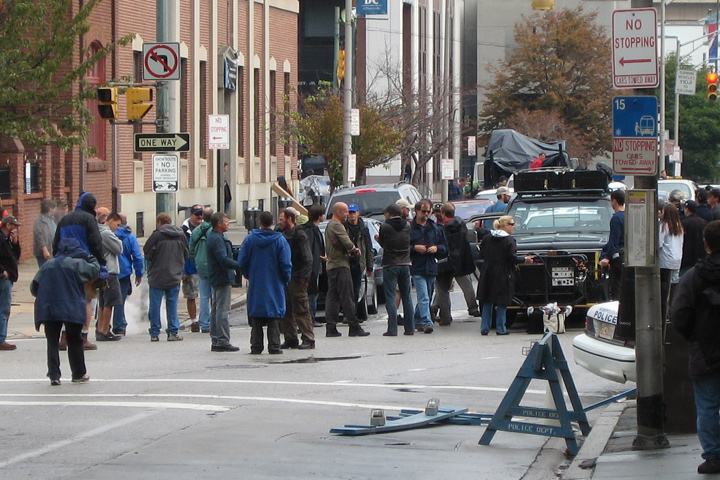
Justin Long, Bruce Willis, and Len Wiseman filming on location in Baltimore

Filming for Live Free or Die Hard started in downtown Baltimore, Maryland on September 23, 2006. Eight different sets were built on a large soundstage for filming many scenes throughout the film. When recording the sound for the semi trailer used in one of the film's final scenes, 18 microphones were used to record the engine, tires, and damage to the vehicle. Post-production for the film only took 16 weeks, when it was more common for similar films to use 26 weeks.

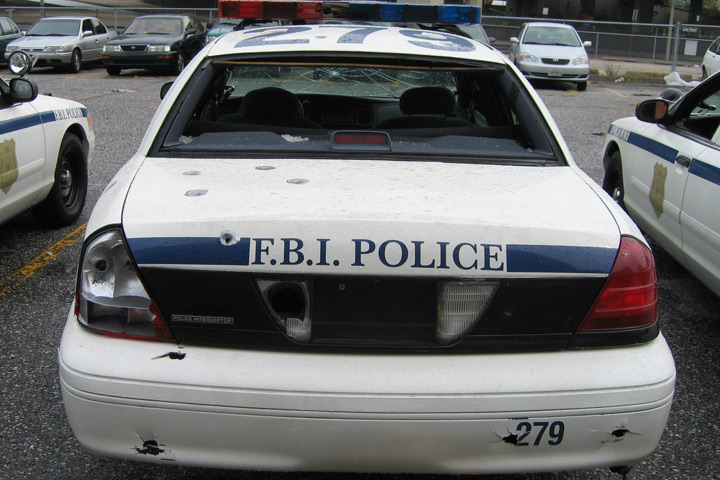
A Ford Crown Victoria Police Interceptor of the FBI Police used during filming

In order to prevent possible injuries and be in peak condition for the film, Willis worked out almost daily for several months prior to filming. Willis was injured on January 24, 2007, during a fight scene, when he was kicked above his right eye by a stunt double for actress Maggie Q who was wearing stiletto heels. Willis described the event as "no big deal" but when Len Wiseman inspected his injury, he noticed that the situation was much more serious than previously thought—in the DVD commentary, Wiseman indicates in inspecting the wound that he could see bone. Willis was hospitalized and received seven stitches which ran through his right eyebrow and down into the corner of his eye. Due to the film's non-linear production schedule, these stitches can accidentally be seen in the scene where McClane first delivers Farrell to Bowman.

Throughout filming, between 200 and 250 stunt people were used. Bruce Willis' stunt double, Larry Rippenkroeger, was knocked unconscious when he fell 25 feet (7.6 m) from a fire escape to the pavement. Rippenkroeger suffered broken bones in his face, several broken ribs, a punctured lung, and fractures in both wrists. Due to his injuries, production was temporarily shut down. Willis personally paid the hotel bills for Rippenkroeger's parents and visited him a number of times at the hospital.

Kevin Smith recalls rewriting scenes on the set of Live Free or Die Hard in his spoken word film Sold Out: A Threevening with Kevin Smith.

== Music ==
The score for Live Free or Die Hard, composed by Marco Beltrami, conducted by Pete Anthony and performed by the Hollywood Studio Symphony, was released on July 2, 2007, by Varèse Sarabande (which also released the soundtracks for the first two Die Hard films), several days after the United States release of the film. This was the first film not to be scored by Michael Kamen, due to his death in 2003; Beltrami incorporates Kamen's thematic material into his score, but Kamen is not credited on the film or the album. Other songs in the film include "Rock & Roll Queen" by The Subways, "Fortunate Son" by Creedence Clearwater Revival and "I'm So Sick" by Flyleaf.

== Release ==
=== Rating ===
In the United States, the first three films in the Die Hard series were rated R by the Motion Picture Association of America. Live Free or Die Hard, however, was edited to obtain a PG-13 rating. In some cases, alternate profanity-free dialogue was shot and used or swearing was cut out in post-production to reduce profanity. Director Len Wiseman commented on the rating, saying "It was about three months into it [production], and I hadn't even heard that it was PG-13 ... But in the end, it was just trying to make the best Die Hard movie, not really thinking so much about what the rating would be."

Bruce Willis was upset with the studio's decision, stating, "I really wanted this one to live up to the promise of the first one, which I always thought was the only really good one. That's a studio decision that is becoming more and more common, because they're trying to reach a broader audience. It seems almost a courageous move to give a picture an R rating these days. But we still made a pretty hardcore, smashmouth film." Willis said he thought that viewers unaware that it was not an R-rated film would not suspect so due to the level and intensity of the action as well as the usage of some profanity, although he admitted these elements were less intense than in the previous films. He also said that this film was the best of the four: "It's unbelievable. I just saw it last week. I personally think, it's better than the first one."

In the United Kingdom, the British Board of Film Classification awarded the film a 15 rating (including the unrated version, released later), the same rating as Die Hard with a Vengeance and Die Hard 2, albeit both were cut for both theatrical and video release. (The first film in the series originally received an 18 certificate.) All films have been re-rated 15 uncut. Die Hard 4.0 was released with no cuts made and the cinema version (i.e., the U.S. PG-13 version) consumer advice read that it "contains frequent action violence and one use of strong language". The unrated version was released on DVD as the "Ultimate Action Edition" with the consumer advice "contains strong language and violence".

=== Home media ===
The Blu-ray and DVD were released on October 29, 2007, in the United Kingdom, on October 31 in Hungary, November 20 in the United States, and December 12 in Australia. The DVD topped rental and sales charts in its opening week of release in the U.S. and Canada. There is an unrated version, which retains much of the original R-rated dialogue, and a theatrical version of the film. However, the unrated version has a branching error that resulted in one of the unrated changes being omitted. The film briefly switches to the PG-13 version in the airbag scene; McClane's strong language is missing from this sequence (although international DVD releases of the unrated version are unaffected). The Blu-ray release features the PG-13 theatrical cut which runs at 128 minutes, while the Collector's Edition DVD includes both the unrated and theatrical versions. Time magazine's Richard Corliss named it one of the Top 10 DVDs of 2007, ranking it at No. 10. In 2015, the movie was featured in the "Die Hard: Nakatomi Plaza" boxed set, which featured the unrated cut of the film on Blu-Ray for the first time in the US. In 2017, the movie was included in the "Die Hard Collection" Blu-ray set with all 5 films in it. Unlike the DVD, the Blu-ray does not contain the branching error during the airbag scene.

The DVD for the film was the first to include a digital copy of the film which could be played on a PC or Mac computer and could also be imported into several models of portable video players. Mike Dunn, a president for 20th Century Fox, stated "The industry has sold nearly 12 billion DVDs to date, and the release of Live Free or Die Hard is the first one that allows consumers to move their content to other devices."

== Reception ==
=== Box office ===
Live Free or Die Hard debuted at No. 2, behind Ratatouille, at the U.S. box office and made $9.1 million in its first day of release in 3,172 theaters, the best opening day take of any film in the Die Hard series (not taking inflation into account). On its opening weekend Live Free or Die Hard made $33.3 million ($48.3 million counting Wednesday and Thursday). The film made $134.5 million domestically, and $253.7 million overseas for a total of $388.2 million, making it the twelfth highest-grossing film of 2007. As of 2022, it is the most successful film in the series.

=== Critical response ===
On Rotten Tomatoes, the film has an approval rating of 82% based on 209 reviews, and an average rating of 6.8/10. The site's critical consensus reads, "Live Free or Die Hard may be preposterous, but it's an efficient, action-packed summer popcorn flick with thrilling stunts and a commanding performance by Bruce Willis. Fans of the previous Die Hard films will not be disappointed." On Metacritic, the film has a weighted average score of 69 out of 100, based on 34 critics, indicating "generally favorable" reviews. Audiences polled by CinemaScore gave the film an average grade of "A−" on an A+ to F scale.

IGN stated, "Like the recent Rocky Balboa, this new Die Hard works as both its own story about an over-the-hill but still vital hero and as a nostalgia trip for those who grew up with the original films." On the television show Ebert & Roeper, film critic Richard Roeper and guest critic Katherine Tulich gave the film "two thumbs up", with Roeper stating that the film is "not the best or most exciting Die Hard, but it is a lot of fun" and that it is his favorite among the Die Hard sequels. Roeper also remarked, "Willis is in top form in his career-defining role." Michael Medved gave the film three and a half out of four stars, opining, "a smart script and spectacular special effects make this the best Die Hard of 'em all."

Conversely, Lawrence Toppman of The Charlotte Observer stated: "I can safely say I've never seen anything as ridiculous as Live Free or Die Hard." Toppman also wrote that the film had a lack of memorable villains and referred to John McClane as "just a bald Terminator with better one-liners".
