= Don't Be Afraid of the Dark (soundtrack) =

Don't Be Afraid of the Dark (Original Motion Picture Soundtrack)

Film score by Marco Beltrami and Buck Sanders
- Released: August 23, 2011
- Studio: Simon Leadley Scoring Stage, Sydney
- Genre: Film score
- Length: 54:50
- Label: Lakeshore
- Producer: Marco Beltrami; Buck Sanders

Marco Beltrami chronology
Scream 4 (2011)	Don't Be Afraid of the Dark (2011)	The Thing (2011)

Buck Sanders chronology
The Hurt Locker (2009)	Don't Be Afraid of the Dark (2011)	Deadfall (2012)

Don't Be Afraid of the Dark (Original Motion Picture Soundtrack) is the film score to the 2011 film Don't Be Afraid of the Dark. The film score is composed by Marco Beltrami and Buck Sanders and released through Lakeshore Records on August 23, 2011.

== Development ==
Marco Beltrami was recommended by the executive producer Guillermo del Toro, who had worked in Mimic (1997), Blade II (2002) and Hellboy (2004) to score for the film, along with his protégé Buck Sanders as the co-composer. According to Beltrami, as del Toro made a very stylized picture of the television film remake and wanted the music to evoke a little bit of the feel of some of the classic horror films from the 1970s. Beltrami was reliant on woodwinds and instruments such as the vibraphone, and melodic ideas, instead of approaching it in a textural way. For the most part, the score was purely orchestral although some sounds were manipulated and processed using echoplex. The lullaby theme for Sally, was made using the carousel sounds, while a corresponding theme for the goblin creatures and other themes accompany much of the score. He considered it as a bit different from some of the horror films, which concentrated more on sound principles, taking acoustic sounds and manipulating them, and while the film having a bit of jump scares, the film for the most part, revolves around the story of Sally and the story is travelled through her point of view unlike the jump scares in the Scream franchise.

== Release ==
The album was released digitally on August 23, 2011, and in physical formats on September 27, 2011, under the Lakeshore Records label.

== Reception ==
Jeannette Catsoulis of The New York Times and Kirk Honeycutt of The Hollywood Reporter considered the score as "thrilling" and "exhillarating". William Ruhlmann of AllMusic wrote "Don't Be Afraid of the Dark, circa 2011, thus, is a deliberately old-fashioned horror movie score by some avid students of the style." Ian Bunting of Daily Record called it a "gothic score".

== Track listing ==
No.	Title	Length
1.	"Gramophone Lullaby"	01:27
2.	"Don’t Be Afraid of the Dark Main Titles"	01:22
3.	"Sally Arrives at Blackwood Manor"	02:42
4.	"Lamb Lamp Lambency"	01:07
5.	"Sally’s Lullaby"	02:13
6.	"Garden Music"	02:24
7.	"Into the Basement"	03:19
8.	"Sneaky Sally"	00:50
9.	"Silly Sally"	02:11
10.	"Tooth Fairy’s Gift"	01:23
11.	"Gardener Gets Snipped"	05:32
12.	"Treesome"	02:46
13.	"Don’t Turn Out the Lights"	02:04
14.	"Bed Bugs"	01:42
15.	"Shrink Rap"	01:22
16.	"Sally Leaves"	02:51
17.	"The Library"	04:01
18.	"Goblins in the Garage"	03:59
19.	"Goblin Trouble"	07:34
20.	"Return to Blackwood"	02:38
21.	"Voices from the Pit"	01:23
Total length:		54:50

== Personnel ==
Credits adapted from liner notes:

- Music composer and producer – Buck Sanders, Marco Beltrami
- Orchestra – Sydney Scoring Orchestra
- Orchestrators – Bill Boston, Rossano Galante
- Conductor – Brett Kelly
- Contractor – Alex Henery
- Recording – Simon Leadley, John Kurlander
- Recordist – Daniel Brown
- Mixing – John Kurlander
- Music editor – Craig Beckett, Jorge Velasco, Tim Ryan, Tyson Lozensky
- Coordinator – Elaine Beckett
- Music librarian – Jessica Wells
- Graphic design – Tim Nelson

== Accolades ==
Award	Category	Recipient(s) and nominee(s)	Result	Ref.
International Film Music Critics Association	Best Original Score for a Fantasy/Science Fiction/Horror Film	Marco Beltrami and Buck Sanders	Nominated	
