= Gods of Egypt (soundtrack) =

Gods of Egypt (Original Motion Picture Soundtrack)

Film score by Marco Beltrami
- Released: February 26, 2016
- Studio: Trackdown Scoring Stage, Sydney, Australia; Pianella Studios, Malibu, California
- Genre: Film score
- Length: 75:04
- Label: Varèse Sarabande
- Producer: Buck Sanders

Marco Beltrami chronology
The Night Before (2015)	Gods of Egypt (2016)	The Shallows (2016)

Gods of Egypt (Original Motion Picture Soundtrack) is the film score to the 2016 film Gods of Egypt directed by Alex Proyas, starring Nikolaj Coster-Waldau, Brenton Thwaites, Chadwick Boseman, Élodie Yung, Courtney Eaton, Rufus Sewell, Gerard Butler and Geoffrey Rush. The film score is composed by Marco Beltrami and was produced by Buck Sanders. It was released through Varèse Sarabande on February 26, 2016.

== Development ==
Marco Beltrami, who composed the film score for Proyas' I, Robot (2004) and Knowing (2009) composed the score for Gods of Egypt. Beltrami considered it to be his biggest film score ever he undertook, taking many months for the writing, conceptualization, recording and mixing. Beltrami admitted that he and Proyas researched together to find the right sound as well as borrowed influences from Black Narcissus (1947), Lawrence of Arabia (1962) and Raiders of the Lost Ark (1981) to find the sensibility of its music they were approaching.

The score depended orchestral music, even though there were processed electronic elements, the score basically led as a traditional, thematic and action music. The Egyptian gods had their own music. Some of the vocal sounds were processed, along with he and Buck Sanders created few unique instruments on the hill outside his Pianella Studios in Malibu. One of them included is an outdoor piano which when recorded during a mild wind, added an open air quality to the instrumental timbre. Over two-and-a-half hours of music had been written for this film.

== Reception ==
Jonathan Broxton of Movie Music UK wrote "Anyone who likes their film music turned up to eleven for an hour, or who has a special affinity for the Egyptian or Middle Eastern-tinged scores I mentioned in the second paragraph, will certainly find Gods of Egypt to their liking. Similarly, anyone who has listened to a Marco Beltrami action score in the past, and wished for him to have a project where he could really let loose with every orchestral force at his disposal, will find this score to be the culmination of those desires." Thomas Glorieux of Maintitles wrote "it doesn't mean that Gods of Egypt is without its flaws though, because as said I feel the middle part lacks something. But the power in that middle part isn't absent whatsoever. Actually, it gives you a remembrance of the good old days when music dared to make an impact, and dared to throw it in your face. In that case Gods of Egypt goes for the kill. It's large and ballsy, and it shows a style that Beltrami isn't that all known for. But it suits him and it's an overall strong score full of power, ideas and guts."

James Southall of Movie Wave wrote "There is plentiful action music of very high quality and the melodic material is memorable and magical. Great stuff." Pete Simons of Synchrotones wrote "Marco Beltrami's Gods of Egypt sure is one huge, loud and aggressive score. The composer pulls no punches, does not hold back and takes this opportunity to deliver, in his own words, his biggest score to date." Justin Chang of Variety called it an "epically tumescent score".

== Track listing ==
No.	Title	Length
1.	"Gods Of Egypt Prologue"	2:41
2.	"Bek And Zaya"	0:44
3.	"Market Chase"	0:30
4.	"Coronation"	2:26
5.	"All Quiet On Set"	0:41
6.	"Set vs. Horus"	3:40
7.	"Hathor's Bedroom"	3:42
8.	"Bek Steals The Eye"	4:08
9.	"Shot Through The Heart"	3:01
10.	"Underdog"	1:25
11.	"Red Army"	1:40
12.	"Wings And A Prayer"	3:01
13.	"Osiris' Garden"	1:29
14.	"Snakes on a Plain"	3:12
15.	"Toth's Library"	3:27
16.	"Straight Out of Egypt"	2:28
17.	"Channeling Zaya"	2:29
18.	"Return of the Mistress of the West"	2:28
19.	"Chaos"	3:42
20.	"Set Confronts Ra"	3:29
21.	"Elevator Music"	3:06
22.	"Obelisk Fight Part 1"	4:12
23.	"Obelisk Fight Part 2"	3:32
24.	"God Of The Impossible"	5:39
25.	"Bek And Zaya's Theme"	4:37
26.	"Hathor's Theme"	3:35
Total length:		75:04

== Personnel ==
Credits adapted from liner notes:

Production

- Music composer – Marco Beltrami
- Music producer – Buck Sanders
- Additional music – Brandon Roberts, Marcus Trumpp
- Electroacoustic design – Buck Sanders
- Recording – John Kurlander
- Digital recordist – Tyson Lozensky, Daniel Brown
- Mixing – John Kurlander, Evan McHugh, Tyson Lozensky
- Mastering – Patricia Sullivan
- Music editor – Jason Fernandez, Jim Schultz, Tim Ryan
- Music coordinator – Elaine Beckett, Rona Rapadas
- Music librarian – Ellie Cumming, Jessica Wells, Joel Geist
- Copyist – JoAnn Kane Music Service
- Executive producer – Robert Townson

Management

- Coordinator, music business and legal affairs – Samantha Hilscher
- Senior coordinator of film music – Ryan Svendsen
- Executive director, music business affairs – Raha Johartchi
- Executive in charge of music for Summit Entertainment – Amy Dunning
- General manager and EVP, music business affairs – Lenny Wohl
- Film music manager – Nikki Triplett
- Music executive – Trevon Kezios

Orchestra

- Orchestra – Sydney Scoring Orchestra
- Orchestrators – Andrew Kinney, Dana Niu, Edward Trybek, Jeff Atmajian, Jon Kull, Mark Graham, Pete Anthony, Rossano Galante
- Conductor – Pete Anthony
- Orchestra contractor – Alex Henery

Choir

- Choir – Cantillation Choir
- Choir contractor – Alison Johnston
- Solo vocals – Angela Little, Asdru Sierra, Sussan Deyhim

== Accolades ==
Award	Category	Nominee(s)	Result	Ref.
AACTA Awards	Best Original Music Score	Marco Beltrami	Nominated	
ASCAP Film and Television Music Awards	Top Box Office Films	Marco Beltrami	Won	
BMI Film & TV Awards	Film Music Award	Marco Beltrami	Won	
