= The Nun II (soundtrack) =

The Nun II (Original Motion Picture Soundtrack)

Film score by Marco Beltrami
- Released: September 1, 2023
- Recorded: 2023
- Studios: Abbey Road Studios, London
- Genre: Film score
- Length: 53:25
- Label: WaterTower Music
- Producer: Marco Beltrami

Marco Beltrami chronology
Renfield (2023)	The Nun II (2023)	Silent Night (2023)

The Nun II (Original Motion Picture Soundtrack) is the film score to the 2023 film The Nun II, which served as the sequel to The Nun (2018) and the eighth installment in The Conjuring Universe. Marco Beltrami composed the film score and was released under the WaterTower Music label on September 1, 2023.

== Background ==
During an interaction with Daniel Schweiger on Film Music Live in April 2023, Beltrami confirmed that he would compose the score for The Nun II, replacing the first film's composer Abel Korzeniowski. With his experience in the horror genre, having previously composed Scream and A Quiet Place series, Beltrami worked on integrating traditional orchestral elements while also exploring modern and processed techniques, reflecting the film's classic and contemporary feel. An aspect, which Beltrami was intrigued being the French countryside setting which provided a classical technique. He recorded the sounds of goat bleats, which had a unique musical voice to it. The score was recorded at the Abbey Road Studios in London. WaterTower Music released the soundtrack on September 1, 2023, a week prior to the film's release.

== Reception ==
Ben of Soundtrack Universe wrote "While there's nothing overtly "wrong" with The Nun II, and indeed fans of Beltrami in Gothic horror mode should rejoice, it unfortunately still suffers when compared to the creativity of its predecessor. That said, listeners seeking a more accessible horror offering that provides plenty of thrills and chills along with some orchestral and choral beauty should not hesitate to give The Nun II a visit." Dennis Harvey of Variety wrote "Ably scored by series newcomer Marco Beltrami, the movie stirs enough pleasurably menacing sound and fury to pass muster". Nikki Baughan of Screen International and Frank Scheck of The Hollywood Reporter called it "bone chilling" and "shivering". Cody Dericks of Next Best Picture wrote "Marco Beltrami’s score is also an effective addition to the frights, bringing an appropriate grandness to the church-based story." In contrast, Prateek Sur of Outlook wrote "The music by Marco Beltrami is another big letdown. Usually, the horror effect gets trebled when the eerie music hits you hard. Sadly, here the music wasn’t eerie enough to give you the jitters. The makers missed out big in this department."

== Track listing ==
No.	Title	Length
1.	"The Nun's Story"	4:09
2.	"The Nun Too"	1:46
3.	"Mean Girls"	1:40
4.	"They Deliver, They Die"	1:55
5.	"Debra and Irene"	1:49
6.	"Crime Scene"	2:16
7.	"It's You Maurice"	3:38
8.	"Nuns in the News"	2:15
9.	"Nunconscious"	2:54
10.	"Follow the Rosary"	3:10
11.	"Goat Check"	5:07
12.	"The Goat"	4:08
13.	"Cucaracha Boca"	3:19
14.	"The Bell Tower"	1:51
15.	"Goodnight Irene"	3:08
16.	"Nun or Goat"	1:44
17.	"I'll Have the Red"	4:33
18.	"Release the Beast Maurice"	1:42
19.	"Second to Nun"	2:00
20.	"Goodbyes"	3:29
Total length:		56:33

== Personnel ==
Credits adapted from Film Music Reporter:

- Music composer: Marco Beltrami
- Music producer: Buck Sanders
- Additional music: Brandon Roberts
- Orchestration: Mark Graham, Pete Anthony, Rossano Galante, Andrew Kinney, Ed Trybek, Jonathan Beard, Henri Wilkinson, Jon Kull
- Orchestra conductors: Marco Beltrami, Mark Graham
- Music preparation: Dave Hage at JoAnn Kane Music Services
- Recorded by: John Barrett, Tyson Lozensky
- Digital recordist: Matt Jones
- Mixed by: Tyson Lozensky
- Music editor: Angela Claverie, Louie Schultz
- Music clearance: Jessica Dolinger
- Scoring consultant: Celeste Chada
- Recorded at: Abbey Road Studios, London

== Accolades ==
Award	Category	Recipient	Result	Ref.
International Film Music Critics Association	Best Original Score for a Fantasy/Science Fiction/Horror Film	Marco Beltrami	Nominated	
