= 3:10 to Yuma (soundtrack) =

3:10 to Yuma (Original Motion Picture Soundtrack)

Film score by Marco Beltrami
- Released: August 28, 2007
- Recorded: 2007
- Studios: Abbey Road Studios, London
- Genre: Film score
- Length: 47:07
- Label: Lionsgate Records
- Producer: Marco Beltrami

Marco Beltrami chronology
Captivity (2007)	3:10 to Yuma (2007)	The Eye (2008)

3:10 to Yuma (Original Motion Picture Soundtrack) is the film score to the 2007 film 3:10 to Yuma directed by James Mangold, starring Russell Crowe and Christian Bale. The film score is composed by Marco Beltrami and released through Lionsgate Records on August 28, 2007. Beltrami was nominated for an Academy Award for Best Original Score and a Critics' Choice Movie Award for Best Score amongst other accolades.

== Background ==
Marco Beltrami composed the film score in his first collaboration with James Mangold. Beltrami considered his dream to score for a western film and called his dream come true moment when Beltrami was involved in the project. Beltrami considered the way of approach in scoring the film, and while he had ideas of big orchestral western but was a more stylized piece. He took several environmental and landscape-related sounds which were not traditionally orchestral and then composed in a western style. Beltrami considered the westerns have "something, sort of slightly anachronistic about them" where most of them are period pieces but they take liberties with that, and he also wanted to follow the same with taking the instruments from that period and use it in a modern way.

Beltrami used periodic acoustic instruments, such as pump organ, tack piano, nylon guitars, native Indian percussion stuff, banjo, fiddle and tin flute amongst others. Even some sounds which were not orchestral were used in a rhythmic way such as chime from a grandfather clock, a processed jaw harp amongst others. Beltrami composed three themes for Dan, Ben Wade, Charlie Prince and rest of the gang. The entire score is based on the combination of the themes blend with each other.

== Release ==
3:10 to Yuma (Original Motion Picture Soundtrack) was released through Lionsgate Records on August 28, 2007. The complete score was released as a limited edition of 3,000 units through La-La Land Recods on April 14, 2015.

== Reception ==
Christian Clemmensen of Filmtracks wrote "Despite potentially turning off a large segment of the film score community, 3:10 to Yuma is a refreshing experience because of the lasting impression left by its distinct character." Clark Douglas of Movie Music UK wrote "Marco Beltrami contributes quite a lot to the proceedings with his fantastic score, a classy, intelligent example of pacing and build-up." Thomas Glorieux of Maintitles wrote: "if you're looking for quirky entries in the genre, this score delivers, and above all, challenging delights in one of those utterly surprising scores of the year. The mood is effective yet it doesn't dance on the boring edge. The highlights come off being cool, inventive and rewarding. More, it all fits the profile of the movie. Its effective and enjoyable edge will surely give Marco Beltrami the credit he deserves." Michael Rechstshaffen of The Hollywood Reporter called it a "percolating score". Todd McCarthy of Variety wrote "the clangy, propulsive score by Marco Beltrami keep a cattle prod on the proceedings." James Leonard of AllMusic wrote "for anyone who enjoyed the film and anyone who's following Beltrami's career, this disc will be mandatory listening." Brian McVikar of Soundtrack.Net wrote "While the material cannot quite sustain the entire album running time, it is nonetheless memorable and engaging."

== Track listing ==
3:10 to Yuma (Original Motion Picture Soundtrack) — standard edition
No.	Title	Length
1.	"Main Title"	1:07
2.	"Ben Takes the Stage / Dan's Burden"	5:46
3.	"Man of His Word"	0:59
4.	"Bisbygliando"	1:23
5.	"Barn Burn"	2:03
6.	"Chinatown"	1:40
7.	"Indian Grounds"	2:50
8.	"Chinese Democracy"	2:52
9.	"One for the Road / Storm Clouds"	4:12
10.	"Trial by Fire"	1:58
11.	"Flight of the Princess"	1:59
12.	"Ben There Done That"	1:36
13.	"Gang Arrives"	1:53
14.	"Ben Arrested"	4:00
15.	"It's Time"	1:02
16.	"Hotel"	0:41
17.	"One Man Left"	3:07
18.	"William Escapes"	1:45
19.	"Bible Study"	2:35
20.	"Who Let the Cows Out?"	1:32
21.	"The 3:10 to Yuma"	2:07
Total length:		47:07

3:10 to Yuma (Original Motion Picture Soundtrack) — deluxe edition
No.	Title	Length
22.	"Stagecoach Crash (alternate)"	1:18
23.	"Charlie Prince"	1:16
24.	"Where's the Doughbro?"	4:04
25.	"Wading into Bisbee"	1:45
26.	"Saving McElroy"	0:59
27.	"Fistful of Dollars"	3:09
28.	"Bad to the Bone / Fireside Chat"	2:54
Total length:		62:12

== Personnel ==
Credits adapted from liner notes:

- Music composer, conductor, piano and pump organ – Marco Beltrami
- Music producer – Buck Sanders, Dan Goldwasser, Marco Beltrami
- Sound design and guitars – Buck Sanders
- Percussion – MB Gordy
- Orchestration – Bill Boston, Dana Niu, Marcus Trumpp, Mark Graham, Rossano Galante
- Contractor – Isobel Griffiths
- Pro-tools recordist – Richard Lancaster
- Pro-tools transfers – Jamie Steele
- Recording – John Kurlander
- Mixing – John Kurlander, Tyson Lozensky
- Mastering – Erick Labson
- Music editor – Jim Schultz
- Executive producer – Cathy Konrad, James Mangold
- Liner notes – James Mangold, Jeff Bond
- Art direction – Dan Goldwasser
- Production assistance – Frank K. DeWald, Neil S. Bulk

== Awards and nominations ==
Award	Date of ceremony	Category	Recipients	Result
Academy Awards	24 February 2008	Best Original Score	Marco Beltrami	Nominated
Broadcast Film Critics Association	7 January 2008	Best Composer	Marco Beltrami	Nominated
Houston Film Critics Society	3 January 2008	Best Original Score	Marco Beltrami	Nominated
World Soundtrack Awards	18 October 2008	Best Original Score of the Year	3:10 to Yuma – Marco Beltrami	Nominated
