= Renfield (soundtrack) =

Renfield (Original Motion Picture Soundtrack)

Film score by Marco Beltrami
- Released: April 14, 2023
- Recorded: 2022–2023
- Studios: Skywalker Sound, Los Angeles; United Recording Studios, Los Angeles; Pianella Studios, Malibu
- Genre: Film score
- Length: 61:09
- Label: Back Lot Music
- Producers: Marco Beltrami; Buck Sanders

Marco Beltrami chronology
Plane (2023)	Renfield (2023)	The Nun II (2023)

Renfield (Original Motion Picture Soundtrack) is the film score to the 2023 film Renfield directed by Chris McKay, inspired by characters from Bram Stoker's 1897 novel Dracula and its 1931 feature film adaptation. The film features Nicholas Hoult as the titular character, and co-stars Ben Schwartz, Shohreh Aghdashloo, Brandon Scott Jones, Adrian Martinez and Nicolas Cage.

The original score is composed by Marco Beltrami who co-produced the film score with Buck Sanders. It was recorded at the Skywalker Sound and United Recording Studios, performed by Skywalker Symphony Orchestra. The score was released through Back Lot Music on April 14, 2023.

== Development ==
Marco Beltrami was announced as the film's composer in January 2023. Beltrami replaced Lorne Balfe, who previously worked with McKay on The Lego Batman Movie (2017) and The Tomorrow War (2021). Gabe Hilfer served as the music supervisor. Having worked on several horror films, Beltrami established ideas on integrating horror with humor into the score. Beltrami recalled that he used Middle Eastern influences into the score, while drawing elements from gangster films, and went through a unique blend of musical styles that enhance the film's emotional depth and comedic elements. For the protagonist, Beltrami wrote a bluesy theme served as a recurrent motif, and he further experimented with use of interchangeable tempos with keys and blending orchestral music with electronic components, where at certain instances led to unintended comedic effects. The score was recorded at the Skywalker Sound and United Recording Studios in Los Angeles, California.

== Track listing ==
No.	Title	Length
1.	"Back to the Beginning"	1:20
2.	"Wake and Bake"	2:18
3.	"Transitional Period"	0:47
4.	"Renfield Leaves Meeting"	0:53
5.	"Apache Joe"	1:35
6.	"Dragging Bodies"	1:04
7.	"Drac-hole"	2:06
8.	"Los Lobos"	1:30
9.	"Mulates Arrival"	2:10
10.	"Rebecca and Renfield Kick Ass"	2:01
11.	"Sweet n Low Hero"	1:50
12.	"World Domination Plan"	2:14
13.	"Inspiration"	1:11
14.	"Teddy Meets Dracula"	2:25
15.	"You're the Monster Renfield"	2:22
16.	"Dracula Arrives at CODA"	1:43
17.	"Dracula Questions"	0:54
18.	"Let's Eat"	1:49
19.	"Renfield Mourns"	1:02
20.	"Rebecca's Escape"	1:57
21.	"Teddy in Dracula's Lair"	1:38
22.	"SWAT Team Ambush"	1:25
23.	"Hello Mr. Dracula"	1:36
24.	"Renfield and Rebecca"	1:31
25.	"Dracula in Renfield's Head"	1:25
26.	"The Familiar Battle"	4:32
27.	"Full Husk Emptied"	1:16
28.	"Rebecca Throws Shade"	1:14
29.	"Final Embrace"	2:49
30.	"Renfield's Affirmations"	1:38
31.	"We Can Be Heros"	1:15
32.	"A Patchy Carmen"	1:30
33.	"Renfield Blues"	2:10
34.	"Dracula's Gaze"	3:59
Total length:		61:09

== Reception ==
Owen Gleiberman of Variety and Frank Scheck of The Hollywood Reporter described the score "pulsating" and "thrilling". Pete Hammond of Deadline Hollywood wrote "Marco Beltrami's ramped-up score is right in tune with the classics of the genre." Lara Popovic of Fordham Observer wrote "The score, crafted by Marco Beltrami, properly encapsulates Dracula and Renfield's eerie beginnings and an action packed plot." Nicholas Bell of Spin noted that Beltrami's "customary engaging" score felt "blunted".

== Personnel ==
Credits adapted from liner notes:

- Music composer and producer – Marco Beltrami
- Score producer – Buck Sanders
- Additional music – Marcus Trumpp, Miles Hankins
- Sound engineer – Rouble Kapoor
- Score recordist – Robert Gatley
- Recording – Leslie Ann Jones, Chandler Harrod
- Mixing – Tyson Lozensky
- Mastering – Patricia Sullivan
- Score editor – Jim Schultz
- Music editor – Julie Houlihan
- Temp music editor – Maarten Hofmeijer
- Music supervisor – Gabe Hilfer
- Music coordinator – Henry Van Roden, Jaylen Thompson
- Copyist – JoAnn Kane Music Service

Orchestra

- Orchestra – Skywalker Symphony Orchestra
- Orchestration – Andrew Kinney, Jimin Park, Mark Graham, Pete Anthony, Philip Klein, Richard Bronskill, Rossano Galante
- Conductor – Sarah Hicks
- Orchestra contractor – Janet Ketchum, Peter Rotter
- Concertmaster – Kay Stern
- Scoring crew – Danielle Adams, Dann Thompson, Sean Royce Martin, Steve Veilleux

Instruments

- Bass – Sean Hurley
- Bassoon – Stephen Paulson, Steven Braunstein
- Cello – Andrés Vera, Angela Lee, Emil Miland, Michael Graham, Miriam Perkoff, Nina Flyer, Stephen Harrison, Vanessa Ruotolo
- Clarinet – Jerome Simas, Jose González Granero
- Double bass – Alden Cohen, Andy Butler, Charles Chandler, Michael Minok, Michel Taddei, Robert Ashley
- Drums – Victor Indrizzo
- Flute – Janet Ketchum, Linda Lukas, Stephanie McNab
- Guitar – Andrew Synowiec, Buck Sanders
- Harp – Jieyin Wu
- Horn – Bruce Roberts
- Oboe – Gabe Young, Russell De Luna
- Percussion – Allen Biggs, Stan Muncy, Timothy Dent
- Piano, celeste – Brenda Vahur
- Timpani – Alex Orfaly
- Trombone – Bruce Chrisp, David Ridge, John Engelkes, Mark Lawrence
- Trumpet – Guy Piddington, John Freeman, Mark Inouye
- Tuba, brass – Jeffrey Anderson
- Viola – Alexandra Leem, Chad Kaltinger, Clio Tilton, Jason Totzke, Katherine Johnk, Marcel Gemperli, Margaret Eldridge, Margaret Tichener, Natalia Vershilova, Patricia Heller
- Violin – Adrienne Sengpiehl, Caitlyn McSherry, Emanuela Nikiforova, Evan Price, Hande Erdem, Jennifer Cho, Jeremy Cohen, Joseph Christianson, Joseph Edelberg, Josepha Fath, Julie Kim, Kayo Miki, Lylia Guion, Lyly Li, Matthew Szemela, Michael Grossman, Michelle Maruyama, Natasha Makhijani, Nelly Kovalev, Rachel Noyes, Rick Shinozaki, Rita Lee, Shaleah Feinstein, Yasushi Ogura, Yuri Cho
- Violin, Soloist – Sandy Cameron

Choirs

- Vocal contractor – Desirée Goyette
- Vocals – Alison Ewing, Carolyn Fluehr, Dana Anderson, Desiree Goyette, Gretchen Klein, Heidi Waterman, Jennifer Mitchell, Leslie Darwin O'Brien, Rachel Songer, Silvie Jensen

Management

- Production manager for Back Lot Music – Zach Grossman
- Music production supervisor for Universal Pictures – Natalie Hayden
- Music business and legal affairs for Universal Pictures – Sarah Hallbauer, Tanya Perara
- Executive in charge of music for Universal Pictures – Mike Knobloch
- Marketing manager for Back Lot Music – Nikki Walsh

== Accolades ==
Awards	Date of ceremony	Category	Recipient(s)	Result	Ref.
Saturn Awards	February 4, 2024	Best Music in a Film	Marco Beltrami	Nominated	
