= The Thing (2011 soundtrack) =

The Thing: Original Motion Picture Soundtrack

Soundtrack album by Marco Beltrami
- Released: October 11, 2011
- Recorded: 2010–2011
- Studios: Eastwood Scoring Stage, Warner Bros. Studios, Burbank, California; Pianella Studios, Malibu, California
- Genre: Film score
- Length: 55:31
- Label: Varèse Sarabande
- Producer: Buck Sanders

Marco Beltrami chronology
Don't Be Afraid of the Dark (2011)	The Thing (2011)	The Woman in Black (2012)

The Thing (Original Motion Picture Soundtrack) is the film score to the 2011 film The Thing directed by Matthijs van Heijningen Jr. which is a prequel to the 1982 film of the same name directed by John Carpenter, which was an adaptation of the 1938 novella Who Goes There? by John W. Campbell. The film score is composed by Marco Beltrami, who considered the score as an homage to Ennio Morricone who scored the original film. The soundtrack was released on October 11, 2011, under the label Varèse Sarabande.

== Background and development ==
In November 2010, it was announced that Marco Beltrami would compose music for The Thing. Beltrami considered his score as a homage to Ennio Morricone's work for the 1982 film, which he considered it a musical heartbeat for the prequel. Beltrami added that the isolation of Antarctic landscape and the creature itself assimilating from the people that it encounters, struck him and led to curate three motives thematically. One motif was the wind, another being the loneliness theme that turns into Kate's theme as the character was the lone warrior, and the monster's motif.

Firstly, Beltrami obtained the sounds of the wind from the sound department and some wind sounds were recorded at his studio, where bottles being placed outside with microphones inside so that it could capture the sound of the wind. Then Beltrami tuned it as a harmonic element, which plays at the beginning of the film. Through that sound, a minor triad chord converges into a one single note and expands afterwards, becoming the motif for the monster theme and gets developed with the orchestra; Beltrami wanted to treat the orchestra like a living organism whose breath expands and converges into a single note and thereby expanding again. The loneliness theme was also interwoven throughout the film.

Beltrami used a complete orchestra with soloists playing flute, bass flute, strings and other instruments being brought; the musicians wrote few gestures and things could be manipulated electronically and used as a part of the texture of the score. Thereafter, Beltrami used fillers on the orchestra to turn it into pads instead of using generic synth pads, so that the orchestra itself can provide the basis for the sustained type of textures behind the score. As Beltrami found that Morricone's theme would not work with the orchestra, he considered the only way that becomes recognizable is if it was used and recorded separately with the whole sound being played exactly the way Morricone wrote it to be. Following the similar approach, Heijningen Jr. and Beltrami included it at the climatic portions, where the Morricone score is played as the film ends where the audience see the shots of the dog going into the American camp.

Heijningen Jr. worked closely with Beltrami with the former wanted to approach things in a new way. In a panorama scene, where the camp discovers the spaceship under the ice, instead of a big orchestral moment, Heijningen Jr. wanted that scene to uncover the distress allowing people to investigate as the creature also wants the same. This developed into a creepy score with arousing curiosity and otherworldly sound. This prompted the idea of processing the orchestra to bring familiar sounds not coming from a standard orchestra. Beltrami considered working with him as inspirational due to his visual style. The score for The Thing was mixed at Beltrami's Pianella Studios in Malibu, California.

== Critical reception ==
James Christopher Monger of AllMusic rated the album 3.5/5 saying, "Composer Marco Beltrami's appropriately tense and brooding score for director Matthijs van Heijningen, Jr.'s 2011 [prequel to] The Thing dutifully echoes Ennio Morricone's stark score for the original version, which in its own way echoed the soundtrack work of that film's director, John Carpenter." Filmtracks wrote "the mass of the suspense and horror material in the middle of The Thing is not likely to impress, but the album's first two and final two tracks do contain upwards of ten minutes worthy of investigation (and securing a third star here), including some surprising tonal beauty in the case of the latter pair."

Jeannette Catsoulis of The New York Times called Beltrami's score as "thrilling". Matt Goldberg of Collider wrote "Heijningen has no problem briefly using Ennio Morricone's terrific score, but then he gets composer Marco Beltrami to devise something new and heavy-handed." Michael Gingold of Fangoria wrote "Marco Beltrami’s score carries a few echoes of Ennio Morricone’s unnerving tones". Rob Nelson of Variety, while complementing Beltrami's score, he added "Ennio Morricone’s spare synth score of ’82 is briefly heard in a film that’s all about expedient replication." JimmyO of JoBlo.com wrote "Marco Beltrami’s creepy score [is] reminiscent of Ennio Maricone’s haunting theme from ‘82". In contrast, Ben Hardwick of Comic Book Resources wrote that "Composer Marco Beltrami composed the prequel, and while it's not a particularly poor score, it's more predictable. As such, the generic theme fails to stand against the tones brought by the original."

== Track listing ==
No.	Title	Length
1.	"God's Country Music"	1:28
2.	"Road to Antarctica"	2:41
3.	"Into the Cave"	0:40
4.	"Eye of the Survivor"	2:25
5.	"Meet and Greet"	2:55
6.	"Autopsy"	3:09
7.	"Cellular Activity"	1:33
8.	"Finding Filling"	3:25
9.	"Well Done"	1:32
10.	"Female Persuasion"	4:51
11.	"Survivors"	3:29
12.	"Open Your Mouth"	4:21
13.	"Antarctic Standoff"	3:04
14.	"Meating of the Minds"	4:29
15.	"Sander Sucks at Hiding"	2:22
16.	"Can't Stand the Heat"	2:10
17.	"Following Sander's Lead"	2:38
18.	"In the Ship"	2:39
19.	"Sander Bucks"	0:45
20.	"The End"	2:34
21.	"How Did You Know?"	2:29
Total length:		55:39

== Personnel ==
Credits adapted from liner notes:

- Music composer – Marco Beltrami
- Music producer – Buck Sanders
- Sound effects – Bruce Barris, Elliot Koretz, Scott Hecker
- Recording and mixing – John Kurlander
- Digital recordist – Jorge Velasco, Tyson Lozensky
- Mastering – Erick Labson
- Music editor – Mark "Vordo" Wlodarkiewicz
- Music preparation – JoAnn Kane Music Services
- Liner notes – Matthijs Van Hijningen
- Executive producer – Robert Townson
- Executive in charge of music for Universal Pictures – Mike Knobloch
- Music business affairs for Universal Pictures – Philip M. Cohen
- Music production coordinator for Universal Pictures – Tiffany Jones

Orchestra

- Orchestra – Hollywood Studio Symphony
- Orchestration – Bill Boston, Brandon Roberts, Dana Niu, Marcus Trumpp, Rossano Galante
- Conductor – Marco Beltrami, Pete Anthony
- Contractor – Peter Rotter
- Concertmaster – Belinda Broughton

Instruments

- Bass – Bruce Morgenthaler, Christian Kollgaard, David Parmeter, Drew D. Dembowski, Michael Valerio, Nicolas Philippon, Stephen Dress, Nico Carmine Abondolo
- Bassoon – Damian Montano, Kenneth Munday, Rose Corrigan
- Cello – Antony Cooke, Cecilia Tsan, Dennis Karmazyn, Erika Duke-Kirkpatrick, Giovanna Clayton, John Walz, Paula Hochhalter, Trevor Handy, Andrew Shulman
- Clarinet – Joshua Ranz, Gary Bovyer, Ralph Williams
- Flute – Heather Clark, Jennifer Olson, Kevin T. McAtee, Sara E. Andon
- Glass winds – Giampiero Ambrosi
- Harp – Marcia Dickstein
- Horn – Brian O'Connor, Daniel P. Kelley, David Everson, David Duke, James Thatcher
- Keyboards – Bryan Pezzone
- Percussion – Alan Estes, Gregory Goodall, Marvin B. Gordy III, Steven Schaeffer, Wade Culbreath
- Trombone – Alexander Iles, William Reichenbach, George Thatcher, William Booth, Alan Kaplan
- Trumpet – Barry Perkins, David Wailes, Rick Baptist, Steven Ravaglioli, Jon Lewis
- Tuba – Doug Tornquist
- Viola – Andrew Duckles, David Walther, Marlow Fisher, Robert Brophy, Scott Hosfeld, Shawn Mann, Victoria Miskolczy, Brian Dembow
- Violin – Alyssa Park, Armen Anassian, Bruce Dukov, Dimitrie Leivici, Elizabeth Hedman, Eun-Mee Ahn, Irina Voloshina, Jacqueline Brand, Joel Pargman, Kevin Connolly, Lisa M. Sutton, Lorenz Gamma, Marc Sazer, Miwako Watanabe, Neil Samples, Nina Evtuhov, Phillip Levy, Radu Pieptea, Roberto Cani, Roger Wilkie, Sara Parkins, Sarah Thornblade, Searmi Park, Shalini Vijayan, Steven Zander, Tamara Hatwan, Tereza L. Stanislav, Yelena Yegoryan, Julie Ann Gigante

== See also ==
- The Thing (1982 soundtrack), the soundtrack album to the original film of the same name
