= Scream 4 (soundtrack) =

Soundtracks to the 2011 film Scream 4

Scream 4 (Original Motion Picture Soundtrack) and Scream 4 (Original Motion Picture Score) are the soundtracks to the 2011 slasher film Scream 4, the fourth instalment in the Scream franchise and the sequel to Scream 3. The former is an original soundtrack consisting of 12 songs performed by various artists mainly of the rock genre, such as Ida Maria, The Sounds and The Novocaines, and released on April 12, 2011, by Lakeshore Records, but was not successful as the previous instalment's soundtracks. The latter, is a score soundtrack consisting the original score composed by veteran franchise composer Marco Beltrami, released under the Varèse Sarabande label on April 19, 2011.

== Scream 4 (Original Motion Picture Soundtrack) ==
Scream 4 (Original Motion Picture Soundtrack)

Soundtrack album by Various artists
- Released: April 12, 2011
- Genres: Pop, rock
- Length: 35:51
- Label: Lakeshore Records
- Producers: Buck Sanders, Richard Glasser

Track listing
No.	Title	Writer(s)	Artist	Length
1.	"Something to Die For"	Jesper Anderberg; Johan Bengtsson; Fredrik Blond; Maja Ivarsson; Felix Rodriguez	The Sounds	3:42
2.	"Bad Karma"	Desmond Child; Ida Maria Sivertsen; Stefan Tornby	Ida Maria	2:55
3.	"Cup of Coffee"	Corey Marriott; Jay Marriott; Steve Turnock; Liam Young	The Novocaines	1:30
4.	"Make My Body"	Christophe Eagleton; Kamtin Mohager	The Chain Gang of 1974	3:37
5.	"Don't Mess with the Original"	Marco Beltrami	Marco Beltrami	3:33
6.	"Yeah Yeah Yeah"	Jesper Anderberg; Johan Bengtsson; Fredrik Blond; Maja Ivarsson; Felix Rodriguez	The Sounds	3:31
7.	"Run for Your Life"	Tamara Schlesinger	6 Day Riot	2:32
8.	"Axel F"	Harold Faltermeyer	Raney Shockne	3:01
9.	"On Fire"	Jesse Laz	Locksley	1:54
10.	"Devils"	Eric Elbogen	Say Hi	2:20
11.	"Denial"	Lucas Banker; Logan Conrad Mader	Stereo Black	3:43
12.	"Jill's America"	Marco Beltrami	Marco Beltrami	3:26
Total length:				35:51

== Scream 4 (Original Motion Picture Score) ==
Scream 4 (Original Motion Picture Score)

Film score by Marco Beltrami
- Released: April 19, 2011
- Genre: Film score
- Length: 46:30
- Label: Varèse Sarabande
- Producer: Marco Beltrami

Marco Beltrami chronology
Soul Surfer (2011)	Scream 4 (2011)	Don't Be Afraid of the Dark (2011)

Scream 4 was the last score composed by Beltrami in the Scream franchise for a while, as he was replaced by Brian Tyler for the fifth and sixth instalments and Jeremy Zuckerman in the television series. The initial release consisted of only 21 tracks from Beltrami's score lasting for an hour. When the score was packaged in a limited edition box set, along with the predecessor's scores, the album consisted the complete score with additional cues and demos from the original score, running for more than one hour. The limited edition box set was released on January 7, 2022, to coincide the soundtrack release of Scream (2022).

Scream 4 – original track listing
No.	Title	Length
1.	"You're Not Real"	5:44
2.	"Dewey In The Morning"	0:29
3.	"Cheating On My Diet / Woodsboro 2010"	2:50
4.	"When You Let Someone Go"	1:36
5.	"It's My Rental"	1:35
6.	"You Were Busy"	1:09
7.	"Which Closet?"	4:32
8.	"Working Together"	1:24
9.	"You Are The Message"	3:14
10.	"Everything's Under Control"	1:18
11.	"I Know How You Feel"	2:30
12.	"Cameras Obscured"	1:33
13.	"Gale and Ghostface"	1:05
14.	"Don't Spoil It"	4:27
15.	"The After Party"	2:47
16.	"I Got It Right"	3:58
17.	"Your Ingenue Days Are Over"	5:45
18.	"The After-After Party"	3:16
19.	"Touch and Go"	2:52
20.	"Don't Spoil It, Part 2"	3:57
21.	"Sid's Advice"	5:41
Total length:		61:42

Scream 4 – limited edition box set track listing
No.	Title	Length
1.	"Stab 6"	3:40
2.	"You're Not Real"	5:44
3.	"Dewey in the Morning"	0:29
4.	"Jenny's Phone Call"	0:42
5.	"Dewey Cleans Up"	0:33
6.	"Cheating On My Diet"	2:10
7.	"Woodsboro 2010"	0:43
8.	"When You Let Someone Go"	1:36
9.	"It's My Rental"	1:35
10.	"The Media Arrives"	0:37
11.	"Interrogation"	1:16
12.	"How's Gale"	1:18
13.	"No Match for the Ninja"	0:48
14.	"You Were Busy"	1:09
15.	"In The Closet"	1:42
16.	"Olivia Dies"	4:30
17.	"Woodsboro Remake"	0:21
18.	"Working Together"	1:22
19.	"You Are the Message"	3:13
20.	"Everything's Under Control"	1:16
21.	"I Know How You Feel"	2:29
22.	"Cameras Obscured"	1:32
23.	"Gale and Ghostface"	1:04
24.	"He's Making the Movie"	0:36
25.	"F**k Bruce Willis"	2:16
26.	"You're a Survivor"	4:26
27.	"The After Party"	2:46
28.	"Make A Move"	0:48
29.	"I'm Gay...If It Helps"	1:16
30.	"Jill, Run!"	1:50
31.	"I Got It, Right"	3:56
32.	"This Is Making A Move"	1:22
33.	"Your Ingenue Days Are Over"	5:44
34.	"Sole Survivor"	3:15
35.	"Touch and Go"	2:50
36.	"You Just Won't Die"	3:55
37.	"Don't F**k with the Original"	1:53
38.	"Dewey in the Morning (original demo)"	0:29
39.	"Dewey Cleans Up (original demo)"	0:29
40.	"Stab Main Title (rejected demo)"	1:01
Total length:		76:42

Scream 4 – limited edition vinyl box set track listing
No.	Title	Length
1.	"You're Not Real"	5:44
2.	"Cheating On My Diet / Woodsboro 2010"	2:50
3.	"When You Let Someone Go"	1:36
4.	"Which Closet?"	4:32
5.	"You Are The Message"	3:14
6.	"Everything's Under Control"	1:18
7.	"I Know How You Feel"	2:30
8.	"I Got It Right"	3:58
9.	"Your Ingenue Days Are Over"	5:45
10.	"The After-After Party"	3:16
11.	"Touch and Go"	2:52
12.	"Don't Spoil It, Part 2"	3:57
13.	"Don't F**k with the Original"	1:53
Total length:		43:31

== Reception ==
Both the soundtrack and the film's score received mixed critical reactions. Gotham News commented that: "This new album attempts to retain the style of the old, while speaking to the present content-diluted market. It has some success, but no cigar." Shadowlocked criticized the soundtrack's overly light tone, saying that "There's little here that I would have picked for a horror movie." James Christopher Monger, in his review for AllMusic, commented that the up-and-coming indie rock and pop songs resulted in a "hodgepodge of moods and styles that never quite clicks, but dutifully echoes the formless post-MP3 musical culture of 2011", giving two-and-a-half to the album.

Filmtracks.com summarised that: "Despite the memorable history Beltrami has afforded the franchise musically, Scream 4 is a substantially disappointing continuation of the narrative. He and four assistant composers handle the 2011 entry from a purely functional stance, tackling individual scenes with stylistic remnants of the previous scores while accomplishing absolutely nothing new." In contrast, the music review site Sountrackgeek gave the score a highly favorable review, saying: "It is possibly the best score in the Scream series, because it is so incredibly forceful. It wants to be full of action and chills and it is. It's not the scariest of scores, but Scream has never been about the moody scares, but rather the surprise scare and crazy fight/chase scenes. It succeeds and I had a blast listening to this from start to finish."

== See also ==
- Music of the Scream franchise
