= The Hurt Locker (soundtrack) =

The Hurt Locker (Original Motion Picture Soundtrack)
- Cover art for the expanded motion picture score

Film score by Marco Beltrami and Buck Sanders
- Released: June 23, 2009
- Genre: Film score
- Length: 31:07
- Label: Lakeshore
- Producers: Marco Beltrami; Buck Sanders

Marco Beltrami chronology
In the Electric Mist (2009)	The Hurt Locker (2009)	Repo Men (2010)

Buck Sanders chronology
Max Payne (2008)	The Hurt Locker (2009)	Don't Be Afraid of the Dark (2010)

The Hurt Locker (Original Motion Picture Soundtrack) is the soundtrack to the 2008 film of the same name. The film's original score is composed by Marco Beltrami and Buck Sanders, consisted of 12 cues from the film released as an album on June 23, 2009, by Lakeshore Records. The score received critical acclaim and won a nomination for Best Original Score at the 82nd Academy Awards. It marked Beltrami's second Academy Award-nomination after the critically acclaimed score for 3:10 to Yuma (2007).

== Development ==
The film's director Kathryn Bigelow roped Beltrami for scoring the film as she liked his work in 3:10 to Yuma (2007). He added that the score had a documentary feel, saying "The fear was that putting too much music in it, would take you out of the picture. After we started working on it, and trying some ideas, we started to make it work hand in hand with the sound as opposed to being something other than the sound. It's unconventional in that the average person wouldn't even know that there was much score at all, but that was the challenge, to make it work with the picture in general."

In addition to Beltrami, the score was co-composed by his associate music producer, Buck Sanders. He said that Bigelow wanted "very atmospheric and ambient music that also worked with the sound design that she already had" (which had been designed by Paul N. J. Ottosson) and "a loner cowboy, Wild-West type of theme for some of the final scenes". He worked with Sanders on most of the scenes, instead of dividing them as a complimentary work, while both of them respectively play guitar and piano, along with Greek musicians played a variety of Middle Eastern instruments and backing vocals.

Bigelow said that her interest going into the film, was that she wanted "to sort of blur the distinction between sound design and score, and I presented this as an idea to both the sound designer and the composers and they both loved that, as a challenge. They thought that it would be a really interesting creative space in which to work." Hence, Ottosson gave the composers some of the sound design tracks he was working, that includes the sounds of helicopters and F-14s flying overhead, which was like "if one could actually qualify the sound of heat and dust and the sun—there were just so many of these beautiful textures that he had and that he was working with. So, the composers were able to actually utilize the components of the sound design and begin to weave together subtly rhythmic and sonic textures that melded beautifully with the design."

== Reception ==
Filmtracks.com wrote "Despite the employment of a tiny chamber ensemble for a handful of sequences, the majority of the score for The Hurt Locker contains an intentionally grating blend of electronic and organic sounds manipulated into a frightfully uncomfortable series of dissonant waves of dull sound." William Ruhlmann of AllMusic wrote "To call The Hurt Locker a suspenseful film is a serious understatement; viewers spend much of the screen time worrying that something is about to explode. The score to accompany that anxiety is necessarily an intense soundscape full of suspended strings, whiny sustained guitar lines, and industrial noise. It's an effective accompaniment to a searing cinematic experience."

== Track listing ==
No.	Title	Length
1.	"The Hurt Locker"	1:52
2.	"Goodnight Bastard"	4:09
3.	"The Long Walk"	1:43
4.	"Hostile"	3:25
5.	"B Company"	2:29
6.	"Man In The Green Bomb Suit"	2:03
7.	"There Will Be Bombs"	2:27
8.	"Body Bomb"	2:34
9.	"Bleeding Deacon"	1:16
10.	"Oil Tanker Aftermath"	3:32
11.	"A Guest In My House"	3:08
12.	"The Way I Am"	2:29
Total length:		31:07
