= Trouble with the Curve (soundtrack) =

Trouble with the Curve (Original Motion Picture Soundtrack)

Film score by Marco Beltrami
- Released: September 18, 2012
- Recorded: 2012
- Studios: Eastwood Scoring Stage, Warner Bros. Studios, Burbank, California; Pianella Studios, Malibu, California
- Genre: Film score
- Length: 42:36
- Label: Varèse Sarabande
- Producer: Buck Sanders

Marco Beltrami chronology
The Woman in Black (2012)	Trouble with the Curve (2012)	The Sessions (2012)

Trouble with the Curve (Original Motion Picture Soundtrack) is the film score to the 2012 film Trouble with the Curve directed by Robert Lorenz starring Clint Eastwood, Amy Adams, Justin Timberlake, Matthew Lillard, and John Goodman. The film score is composed by Marco Beltrami and released through Varèse Sarabande label on September 18, 2012.

== Development ==
Marco Beltrami composed the film score, who noted that the film was "deceptively simple" as the performances were so strong, with the film did not need help with any story points. Beltrami considered the spotting of the film's music were extremely delicate which made writing the score quite challenging, despite its simplistic Americana feel. Beltrami used a bluesy electric guitar for Gus Lobel (Eastwood), and a warm acoustic guitar for Mickey Lobel (Adams), while Gus' theme is progressed acoustically.

Robert Lorenz, who knew that Eastwood usually composes music for his own films, said that Eastwood "had a strong desire to distinguish this film" from Eastwood's directorials. Beltrami had to experiment with few pieces until they found the right notes or instruments. Eastwood attended a day of recording which took place at the Eastwood Scoring Stage on the Warner Bros. Studios Burbank while the mixing happened at Beltrami's Pianella Studios in Malibu, California.

== Reception ==
Erin V. of The Joy of Movies wrote "What I like about the music here is how it helps to tell the story without ever becoming cloying. Like the whole film, it is a quiet human drama, and the music appropriately reflects this. Beltrami's score is a prime example of how dramatic doesn't always mean loud. The whole score is fairly even in volume but works very well at portraying its emotional beats." Filmtracks wrote "Beltrami competently follows all the basic genre rules and provides the bare minimum necessary for the music to function." Justin Chang of Variety and Todd McCarthy of The Hollywood Reporter considered the score to be "equally fine" and "dramatic".

== Track listing ==
No.	Title	Length
1.	"Good Mornin' Gus"	1:48
2.	"Flanagan"	0:55
3.	"Late Night Call"	0:53
4.	"Beautiful North Carolina"	1:45
5.	"Bo's Homer"	2:35
6.	"Mickey's Home Run"	1:47
7.	"Another Hit"	2:50
8.	"Post Clogging"	0:56
9.	"Walking and Talking"	1:16
10.	"Ballgame"	0:48
11.	"Wilson at Bat"	3:11
12.	"Off the Case"	1:19
13.	"He'll Wait"	3:58
14.	"They Choose Bo"	1:32
15.	"Horse with No Name"	2:50
16.	"Get on the Bus, Gus"	1:19
17.	"The Real Deal"	3:12
18.	"Trouble with the Curve"	4:29
19.	"Not All I've Got"	2:04
20.	"On My Way" (performed by The Neighbors with Greg Camp)	3:09
Total length:		42:36

== Personnel ==
Credits adapted from liner notes:

- Music composer – Marco Beltrami
- Producer – Buck Sanders
- Digital recordist – Vincent Cirilli
- Prelay recorder – Tyson Lozensky
- Auricle mastermind – Richard Grant
- Recording and mixing – Bobby Fernandez
- Mastering – Erick Labson
- Music editor – Chris McGeary
- Music preparation – Joann Kane Music Service
- Executive producer – Robert Townson

Orchestra

- Orchestra – Hollywood Studio Symphony
- Orchestrators – Pete Anthony, Dennis Smith, Jim Honeyman, Rossano Galante
- Conductor – Pete Anthony
- Contractor – Peter Rotter
- Concertmaster – Belinda Broughton

Instruments

- Bass – David Parmeter, Drew Dembowski, Edward Meares, Michael Valerio, Nico Abondolo
- Bassoon – Rose Corrigan, Michael O'Donovan
- Cello – Armen Ksajikian, Dennis Karmazyn, George Kim Scholes, John Walz, Paula Hochhalter, Steve Erdody, Tim Landauer, Andrew Shulman
- Clarinet – Joshua Ranz, Gary Bovyer
- Flute – Geraldine Rotella, Sara Andon
- Guitar – Andrew Synowiec, Buck Sanders, George Doering
- Harp – Jo Ann Turovsky, Katie Kirkpatrick
- Horn – Brian O'Connor, Daniel P. Kelley, Dave Everson, Steve Becknell, James Thatcher
- Keyboards – Bryan Pezzone
- Oboe – Lara Wickes, Leslie Reed
- Percussion – Marvin B. Gordy III, Wade Culbreath
- Trombone – Alexander Iles, William Reichenbach, Steven Holtman, Alan Kaplan
- Trumpet – Barry Perkins, David Washburn, Jon Lewis
- Tuba – Doug Tornquist
- Viola – Darrin McCann, David Walther, Jennie Hansen, Jessica Vanvelzen-Freer, Keith Greene, Robert Brophy, Roland Kato, Shawn Mann, Thomas Diener, Victoria Miskolczy, Brian Dembow
- Violin – Bruce Dukov, Darius Campo, Eun-Mee Ahn, Helen Nightengale, Irina Voloshina, Jay Rosen, Katia Popov, Kevin Connolly, Lisa Sutton, Lorand Lokuszta, Lorenz Gamma, Marc Sazer, Maya Magub, Natalie Leggett, Phillip Levy, Rafael Rishik, Roberto Cani, Roger Wilkie, Shalini Vijayan, Songa Lee, Tereza Stanislav, Yelena Yegoryan, Julie Gigante
