= Knowing (soundtrack) =

Knowing (Original Motion Picture Soundtrack)

Film score by Marco Beltrami
- Released: March 24, 2009
- Recorded: 2008–2009
- Studios: Trackdown Scoring Stage, Sydney, Australia
- Genre: Film score
- Length: 65:31 (standard); 113:06 (deluxe)
- Label: Varèse Sarabande
- Producer: Marco Beltrami

Marco Beltrami chronology
Amusement (2009)	Knowing (2009)	In the Electric Mist (2009)

Knowing (Original Motion Picture Soundtrack) is the film score to the 2009 film Knowing directed by Alex Proyas starring Nicolas Cage. The score is composed by Marco Beltrami and released through Varèse Sarabande on March 24, 2009. A double disc deluxe edition featuring additional tracks was released on April 30, 2021.

== Background and development ==
Marco Beltrami composed the score after previously collaborating with Proyas for I, Robot (2004). Proyas sent the script for Knowing in late 2004, owing to him trusting Beltrami in a creative mind ensuring his involvement from the onset. One of the earlier concepts they discussed was the idea of "backwards music" which reflected the themes of mystery, disorder and hidden patterns. Despite the monumental delays, Proyas stayed in contact with Beltrami, reassuring him that the film would eventually happen. Beltrami later explained that he appreciated how the director used his early mock-ups during editing, although he worried studio executives might mistake the synthetic demos for the finished orchestral score. He also noted the difficulty of temp tracks, especially when filmmakers used his own previous music, because it risked forcing him to imitate himself rather than create something original.

Beltrami said the real musical breakthrough came once he saw the finished images rather than simply reading the script. He viewed the film as a puzzle built around the tension between randomness and destiny, and he translated that into music through a twelve-tone structure that moved from chaos into order. This idea first appeared in the "Numerology" sequence where John (Cage) deciphers the mysterious numbers, and it expanded into the rest of the score, representing the character's frantic thought process and obsession with finding meaning. Alongside this intellectual motif, Beltrami also created an emotional theme centered on grief, loss, and the father-son relationship at the heart of the story. He achieved this by blending major and minor tonalities together, musically reflecting the film's constant uncertainty between hope and catastrophe.

Marco Beltrami explained that many of the score's distinctive sounds in Knowing were built from recurring musical ideas that evolved throughout the film. The opening uses heavily manipulated Tibetan bowls to create an eerie, ambient atmosphere around Lucinda and the sun, while later cues such as "Door Jam" develop the earlier "Numerology" concept into frantic rhythmic string writing. During the scene where John scrapes paint from the door while Diana escapes with the children, Beltrami used rapidly plucked and striking strings derived from the twelve-tone row introduced earlier in the film. Although listeners compared the effect to composers like Bernard Herrmann or guitarist Robert Fripp, Beltrami said these influences were subconscious rather than intentional. He emphasized that the cue's purpose was to musically represent John's obsessive mental state and the increasing panic surrounding the mystery. Throughout the score, themes connected to John and Caleb repeatedly reappear in altered forms, whether during the subway aftermath, the alien pursuit in the woods, or the "It's the Sun" revelation scene where John finally understands the solar catastrophe.

Beltrami also described how later cues expanded the film's emotional and philosophical ideas. "Moose on the Loose" which accompanies Caleb witnessing burning forests and fleeing animals, uses harsh brass, percussion, and unsettling textures to create what Guillermo del Toro called "The Butt Willies" a physical feeling of dread and unease. For the film's finale and "New World Round" sequence, Beltrami pursued a completely different sound based on pure natural overtones: strings played harmonics while brass instruments performed without valves, creating an almost primordial sonic landscape for the children's arrival on a new planet. The descending major/minor motif tied back once again to John and Caleb's theme, symbolizing both hope and tragedy simultaneously. Beltrami credited director Alex Proyas for encouraging experimentation and alternate versions of cues, especially when temp tracks from Beltrami's earlier scores complicated the creative process. The score also utilizes classical works such as "Symphony No. 7 (Beethoven) – Allegretto" which played without sound effects in the final Boston disaster sequence.

== Release ==
The soundtrack was released through Varèse Sarabande on March 24, 2009. A deluxe edition featuring additional tracks was released on April 30, 2021 as a double CD.

== Reception ==
Jonathan Broxton of Movie Music UK wrote "Anyone whose exposure to Beltrami's work has been through his more recent horror and thriller scores would do well to seek out this score, because although its tone is not greatly different from some of his more recent efforts, and although there is still a great deal of difficult dissonance and nervousness in the suspense writing, the high points are more than worth the wait." Thomas Gloriuex of Maintitles wrote "Knowing is a good film score, at least in the sense it absolutely delivers you what the movie promises. For most of the time, Knowing takes you on a quest for the truth, unknowingly guiding you towards a climax many didn't see coming at all. Thereby Marco Beltrami's score follows that quest with the gloomiest sense and the tightest rhythm. At times on edge, at times mysterious, at times over conquering, Knowing is a soundtrack for a specific moment and mood in your day, but it sure gets the job done no matter what, once Beltrami gives us a climax to be reckoned with. So know this, the long build up really goes to something."

Filmtracks wrote "Beltrami and team's music for Knowing is functional but just as predictable as the film's disappointingly shallow narrative, and the sudden shift in mood at the end betrays the personality of the score's majority." Eric Schneider of AllMusic wrote "Perfectly complementing the dark mood established by director Alex Proyas, these orchestral pieces [...] may be playfully titled, but they are anything except lighthearted, as evinced by the chilling 'Moose on the Loose' and the startling 'Loudmouth." Konstantinos Sotiropoulos of Soundtrack Beat wrote "the score also has poignant emotional moments and a grand scope befitting the film's apocalyptic implications." Todd McCarthy of Variety wrote "Marco Beltrami's vigorous score, buttressed at key moments by Beethoven's Symphony No. 7, is strictly A-level." Michael Gingold of Fangoria wrote "Marco Beltrami's score (augmented by well-chosen classical pieces by Beethoven and Gustav Holst) varied enough that it works even when amped up to bombastic levels."

== Track listing ==
=== Standard edition ===
No.	Title	Length
1.	"Main Titles"	2:09
2.	"Door Jam"	3:10
3.	"EMT"	2:19
4.	"John and Caleb"	1:58
5.	"New York"	4:11
6.	"Aftermath"	1:46
7.	"Not a Kid Anymore"	1:55
8.	"Moose on the Loose"	2:20
9.	"Stalking the Waylands"	1:24
10.	"Numerology"	3:06
11.	"It's the Sun"	2:43
12.	"John Spills"	3:26
13.	"Trailer Music"	3:20
14.	"33"	3:29
15.	"Loudmouth"	2:43
16.	"Revelations"	3:29
17.	"Thataway!"	2:07
18.	"Shock and Aww"	4:02
19.	"Caleb Leaves"	7:06
20.	"Roll Over Beethoven"	4:14
21.	"New World Round"	2:59
22.	"Who Wants an Apple?"	1:35
Total length:		65:31

=== Deluxe edition ===
Disc 1
No.	Title	Length
1.	"Summit / Escape Logo"	0:34
2.	"Lucy In The Sky"	1:23
3.	"Loopy Lucy"	0:54
4.	"Loopy Lucy Lost"	1:38
5.	"Main Titles"	2:11
6.	"Tiger Music"	1:41
7.	"Beethoven Symphony #7 2nd Movement"	1:09
8.	"Shit Happens"	0:51
9.	"The Envelope Please"	2:04
10.	"Nick At Night"	1:04
11.	"Numerology"	3:38
12.	"MIT Wit"	0:44
13.	"Strangers With Candy"	1:48
14.	"Waiting For Bad News #1"	1:31
15.	"Waiting For Bad News #2"	1:49
16.	"Lat And Long"	3:28
17.	"Not A Kid Anymore"	1:54
18.	"Drinking Buddies"	1:04
19.	"Moose On The Loose"	2:19
20.	"Tree Slugger"	1:04
21.	"Stalking The Waylands"	1:23
22.	"Creepy John"	2:08
23.	"Johnny Get Your Gun"	1:21
24.	"No News"	0:33
25.	"Nick To NY #1"	4:05
26.	"Nick To NY #2"	0:33
27.	"Off The Rails"	1:07
28.	"Crash Aftermath"	1:29
29.	"I Need To Know"	3:37
30.	"Trailer Music"	3:26
31.	"33"	3:41
32.	"Loud Mouth"	3:07
Total length:		59:18

Disc 2
No.	Title	Length
1.	"Bedtime"	1:57
2.	"It's The Sun"	2:43
3.	"Suntastic"	0:58
4.	"Revelations By John"	3:27
5.	"Numbo Jumbo"	0:36
6.	"Door Jam"	3:15
7.	"Going Mental"	1:25
8.	"EMT"	2:23
9.	"Kidnapped"	0:47
10.	"Post-Partum"	0:53
11.	"Thataway!"	2:10
12.	"Goodbye Diana"	0:56
13.	"Shock And Awe"	5:12
14.	"Caleb Leaves"	7:18
15.	"Roll Over Beethoven 7th"	1:31
16.	"Who Wants An Apple?"	1:33
17.	"Eden"	1:27
18.	"The Knowing"	1:32
19.	"Roll Over Beethoven"	5:53
20.	"Aftermath"	1:46
21.	"Sunny Delight"	2:59
22.	"New World"	3:07
Total length:		53:48

== Personnel ==
Credits adapted from liner notes:

- Music composer and producer – Marco Beltrami
- Additional music – Marcus Trumpp, Buck Sanders
- Co-producer – Buck Sanders
- Orchestra – Sydney Scoring Orchestra
- Orchestrators – Bill Boston, Dana Niu, Marcus Trumpp, Rossano Galante
- Choir – The Song Company
- Conductor – Brett Kelly, Brett Weymark
- Contractor – Alex Henery
- Recording and mixing – John Kurlander
- Score recordist – Craig Beckett
- Digital recordist – Daniel Brown
- Mastering – Erick Labson
- Score editor – Simon Leadley, Tim Ryan
- Music coordinator – Elaine Beckett
- Copyist – Jessica Wells, Jigsaw Music
- Executive producer – Paul Katz, Robert Townson
- Music business affairs – Christine Bergren

== Accolades ==
Award	Category	Recipient(s) and nominee(s)	Result	Ref.
ASCAP Film and Television Music Awards	Top Box Office Films	Marco Beltrami	Won	
International Film Music Critics Association	Best Original Score for a Fantasy/Science Fiction Film	Marco Beltrami	Nominated	
