= The Sessions (soundtrack) =

The Sessions (Original Motion Picture Soundtrack)

Film score by Marco Beltrami
- Released: October 16, 2012
- Recorded: 2012
- Studio: Pianella Studios, Malibu, California
- Genre: Film score
- Length: 24:22
- Label: Rhino Entertainment
- Producer: Marco Beltrami; Buck Sanders

Marco Beltrami chronology
Trouble with the Curve (2012)	The Sessions (2012)	Deadfall (2012)

The Sessions (Original Motion Picture Soundtrack) is the film score to the 2012 film The Sessions directed by Ben Lewin starring John Hawkes and Helen Hunt. The film score is composed by Marco Beltrami and released through Rhino Entertainment on October 16, 2012.

== Development ==
Marco Beltrami composed the film score. Lewin chose him after liking his textural score for The Hurt Locker (2008). Beltrami wanted the music to be an extension what the picture does to the audiences, adding "finding that delicate in-between (approach)—just enough but not too much—was really fun, just working with those small nuances." While discussing with Lewin on the specific musical ideas for the film, the latter responded to chamber music referencing a piece of Franz Schubert's composition used sporadically in the film. The feel of chamber music was liked by Lewin and seemed to work well as a theme for the relationship between the principal characters. Beltrami then composed a slow-paced classically oriented theme which was used in the second act. He applied the chamber music sensibility which involves the use of string quartet, bass, woodwinds, piano and an unusual sound that was created by rubbing the edges of crystal bowls which was processed into a more mediative sound. It was recorded at Beltrami's Pianella Studios in Malibu, California.

== Release ==
The film score was released through Rhino Entertainment digitally on October 16, 2012 and in physical formats on November 20, 2012.

== Reception ==
Thomas Glorieux of Maintitles wrote "The Sessions is mostly calm and emotional mood. So you have to be in a certain kind of mood to fully appreciate this score. But the melodic intentions easily fulfill that listen with ease after that. It's not Marco Beltrami at his most innovating, but it's Marco Beltrami at his most intimate instead." James Southall of Movie Wave wrote "Ultimately it is simply a very nice album, showcasing a seldom-heard side to a very fine film composer." Todd McCarthy of The Hollywood Reporter wrote "Marco Beltrami’s score tilts too much toward the precious, providing emotional cues when more restraint would have been welcome." Peter Debruge of Variety called it a "tenderly understated score".

Anthony Kaufman of Screen International called the score as "gentle". Ty Burr of The Boston Globe wrote "Marco Beltrami’s score tries to sneak in and tug our heartstrings from time to time". Richard Lawson of The Atlantic wrote "Marco Beltrami has written a lilting, wistful score that [Ben] Lewen employs deftly". Critic David Edelstein described it a "sprightly score", while Shannon Harvey of The West Australian described it as "plaintive". Tim Robey of The Daily Telegraph wrote "the affectedly sparse, Arvo Pärt-ish score by Marco Beltrami seems to insist too serenely on the specialness of every moment."

== Track listing ==
No.	Title	Length
1.	"Newscast"	1:31
2.	"Breathing"	2:06
3.	"Casanova's Kiss"	2:27
4.	"Amanda Reckonwith"	2:09
5.	"Rejection"	1:18
6.	"Priest Blessing"	1:08
7.	"Hair Trigger"	1:53
8.	"Boy at the Beach"	1:33
9.	"Coffee Date"	3:17
10.	"Last Date"	1:25
11.	"Love Poem"	2:35
12.	"You Forgot This"	1:02
13.	"Mark's Kiss"	1:58
Total length:		24:22

== Accolades ==
Award	Date of ceremony	Category	Recipients and nominees	Result
Hollywood Music in Media Awards	November 16, 2012	Best Original Score in a Feature Film	Marco Beltrami	Won
International Film Music Critics Association	February 21, 2013	Best Original Score for a Comedy Film	Marco Beltrami	Nominated

== Personnel ==
- Music composer, conductor and orchestrator: Marco Beltrami
- Music producers: Marco Beltrami, Buck Sanders
- Performer: Hollywood Studio Symphony
- Recording and mixing: John Kurlander
- Assistant engineer: Tyson Lozensky
- Music editor: Sharon Smith
