= Trackdown =

Trackdown may refer to:

- Trackdown (TV series), 1957
- Trackdown (film), 1976
- Trackdown Digital, an Australian company

== See also ==
- Track Down, a 2000 film
