= Max Payne (disambiguation) =

Max Payne is a video game series.

Max Payne may also refer to:

- Max Payne (video game), first video game of the series
- Max Payne (character), character from the video game series
- Max Payne (film), 2008 film based on the video game series
  - Max Payne (soundtrack), a score to the film
- Max Payne (racing driver) (born 1940), British former racing driver
- Maxx Payne (born 1961), American musician, actor and former professional wrestler
- Max Landon Payne (1970–2009), American convicted murderer
