= The Woman in Black (soundtrack) =

The Woman in Black (Original Motion Picture Soundtrack)

Soundtrack album by Marco Beltrami
- Released: 6 February 2012
- Recorded: 2011–2012
- Studios: Pianella Studios, Malibu, California
- Genre: Film score
- Length: 55:24
- Label: Silva Screen Records
- Producer: Marco Beltrami

Marco Beltrami chronology
The Thing (2011)	The Woman in Black (2011)	Trouble with the Curve (2012)

The Woman in Black (Original Motion Picture Soundtrack) is the film score to the 2012 film The Woman in Black directed by James Watkins, starring Daniel Radcliffe, Ciarán Hinds, Janet McTeer, Sophie Stuckey and Liz White. The film score is composed by Marco Beltrami and recorded and mixed at Beltrami's Pianella Studios in Malibu, California. It was released as a soundtrack album on 6 February 2012 by Silva Screen Records.

"G.G." by MUCC is the image song for the Japanese version.

== Reception ==
Michael Gingold of Fangoria wrote "Marco Beltrami’s score raise goosebumps without overwhelming the visuals." Adam Rayner of WhatCulture wrote "equally integral is Marco Beltrami's ghostly score". Leslie Felperin of Variety described the score as "exhilarating". The Oregonian Beltrami's music "begin sounding more and more like desperate exclamation points as the movie goes on".

== Track listing ==
All music is composed by Marco Beltrami.

No.	Title	Length
1.	"Tea for Three Plus One"	1:40
2.	"The Woman in Black"	1:56
3.	"Crossing the Causeway"	2:24
4.	"Bills Past Due"	1:22
5.	"Voices in the Mist"	2:00
6.	"Journey North"	2:56
7.	"Cellar Eye"	2:49
8.	"First Death"	2:00
9.	"The Attic Room"	1:56
10.	"The Door Opens"	1:46
11.	"Fireside"	2:30
12.	"You Could Have Saved Him"	2:58
13.	"Crazy Writing"	2:16
14.	"In the Graveyard"	2:56
15.	"Elisabeth's Vision"	3:40
16.	"Into the Fire"	3:57
17.	"Jennet's Letters"	2:12
18.	"Race to the Marsh"	2:11
19.	"Rising From the Mud"	3:13
20.	"Summoning the Woman in Black"	4:27
21.	"Reunion"	1:42
22.	"Arthur's Theme"	2:46
Total length:		55:24

== Personnel ==
Credits adapted from liner notes:

- Music composer and producer – Marco Beltrami
- Additional music – Brandon Roberts, Marcus Trumpp
- Recording and mixing – John Kurlander
- Mastering – Erick Labson
- Score editor – John Warhurst
- Assistant engineer – Tyson Lozensky
- Score coordinator – Pete Compton
- Executive producer – David Stoner, Reynold D'Silva
- Artwork – Stuart Ford

== Accolades ==
Award	Category	Recipient(s) and nominee(s)	Result	Ref.
ASCAP Film and Television Music Awards	Top Box Office Films	Marco Beltrami	Won	
Fangoria Chainsaw Awards	Best Score	Marco Beltrami	Nominated	
