= I, Robot (soundtrack) =

Film score by Marco Beltrami
- Released: July 20, 2004
- Studios: Newman Scoring Stage, 20th Century Fox, Los Angeles
- Genre: Film score
- Length: 44:06
- Labels: Varèse Sarabande; Fox Music
- Producer: Marco Beltrami

Marco Beltrami chronology
Hellboy (2004)	I, Robot (2004)	Flight of the Phoenix (2004)

I, Robot (Original Motion Picture Soundtrack) is the film score soundtrack to the 2004 film I, Robot, directed by Alex Proyas starring Will Smith. The musical score is composed by Marco Beltrami, conducted by Beltrami and Pete Anthony, performed by the Hollywood Studio Symphony, and released under the Varèse Sarabande label on July 20, 2004.

== Development ==
Marco Beltrami composed the film score "with only 17 days to render the fully-finished work". It was scored for 95 orchestral musicians and 25 choral performers, with emphasis placed on sharp brass ostinatos. Beltrami composed the brass section to exchange octaves with the strings accenting scales in between. The technique has been compared as Beltrami's "sincere effort to emulate the styles of Elliot Goldenthal and Jerry Goldsmith and roll them into one unique package." The "Tunnel Chase" scene, according to Mikeal Carson, starts "atmospherically but transforms into a kinetic adrenaline rush with powerful brass writing and ferocious percussion parts". The "Spiderbots" cue highlights ostinatos in meters such as 6/8 and 5/4 and reveals "Beltrami's trademark string writing which leads to an orchestral/choral finale." Despite modified representations of the theme throughout the movie, it is the end credits that eventually showcase the entire musical theme. Erik Aadahl and Craig Berkey were the lead sound designers.

== Release ==
I, Robot's score was released under the Varèse Sarabande label on July 20, 2004, four days after the film's release. The score album featured 15 tracks running for 44 minutes. An unofficial score album was published by Chicago Music Company by late-2004, that featured the complete score that runs for one-and-a-half hours and has 35 tracks.

== Reception ==
According to Christian Clemmensen of Filmtracks, "I, Robot is yet another Beltrami score that promises greatness but lacks the passion, cohesion, or distinctive personality to achieve its top form. Like the film, the score is all procedural action and no intelligent science-fiction." Jonathan Broxton of Movie Music UK wrote "With this score, and his equally exciting work on Hellboy earlier in the year, Beltrami is firmly announcing himself as one of film music's potential big league players of the future." James Christopher Monger of AllMusic reviewed that the score "complements the material nicely, resulting in a serviceable but eventually forgettable entry into the realm of blockbuster fly-by's." Dan Goldwasser of Soundtrack.Net wrote "Overall this is a great album to listen to. Marco has done a wonderful job, coming right off of Hellboy, and so far his scores for 2004 have been some of the best works of his career."

== Track listing ==
I, Robot (Original Motion Picture Soundtrack) track listing
No.	Title	Length
1.	"Main Titles"	1:31
2.	"Gangs of Chicago"	3:13
3.	"I, Robot Theme (End Credits)"	3:15
4.	"New Arrivals"	1:06
5.	"Tunnel Chase"	3:10
6.	"Sonny's Interrogation"	1:27
7.	"Spooner Spills"	4:21
8.	"Chicago 2035"	1:37
9.	"Purse Snatcher"	1:00
10.	"Need Some Nanites"	2:53
11.	"1001 Robots"	4:16
12.	"Dead Robot Walking"	5:09
13.	"Man on the Inside"	2:25
14.	"Spiderbots"	4:19
15.	"Round Up"	4:24
Total length:		44:06

== Personnel ==
- Music composer and producer – Marco Beltrami
- Recording and mixing – John Kurlander
- Digital recordist – Kevin Globerman
- Music editor – Alex Gibson
- Assistant music editor – Jeremy Raub
- Executive producer – Robert Townson
- Music supervisor – Michael Knobloch

Orchestra

- Performer – The Hollywood Studio Symphony
- Orchestrators – Bill Boston, Carlos Rodriguez, Ceiri Torjussen, Chris Guardino, Dennis Smith, Frank Bennett, Jim Honeyman, Jon Kull, Marcus Trumpp, Pete Anthony, Randy Kerber
- Conductor – Marco Beltrami, Pete Anthony
- Orchestra contractor – Sandy DeCrescent
- Copyist – JoAnn Kane Music Services
- Stage engineer – William Stein, Bill Talbott
- Stage recordist – Matt Patterson, John Rodd
- Stage manager – Jason Lloyd, Tom Steel
- Concertmaster – Endre Granat
- Bass – Bruce Morgenthaler, Christian Kollgaard, David Parmeter, Mike Valerio, Oscar Hidalgo, Steve Edelman, Susan Ranney, Nico Abondolo
- Bassoon – Allen Savedoff, Rose Corrigan, Ken Munday
- Cello – Tony Cooke, Armen Ksajikian, Cecilia Tsan, Christine Ermacoff, Dane Little, David Speltz, Dennis Karmazyn, Doug Davis, Hugh Livingston, John Walz, Tim Landauer, Steve Erdody
- Clarinet – Gary Bovyer, Ralph Williams, James Kanter
- Flute – Dave Shostac, Geraldine Rotella, Stephen Kujala, Jim Walker
- Harp – Marcia Dickstein
- Horns – Brian O'Connor, David Duke, John A. Reynolds, Richard Todd, Steven Becknell, James W. Thatcher
- Keyboards – Bryan Pezzone, Randy Kerber
- Oboe – Barbara Northcutt, Phillip Ayling
- Percussion – Alan Estes, Greg Goodall, M.B. Gordy, Steve Schaeffer, Tom Raney, Wade Culbreath
- Synthesizer – Buck Sanders
- Trombone – Andrew Thomas Malloy, George Thatcher, William Booth, Alan Kaplan
- Trumpet – David Washburn, Rick Baptist, Jon Lewis
- Tuba – James Self
- Viola – Cassandra Lynne Richburg, Darrin McCann, David Walther, Keith Greene, Marlow Fisher, Matt Funes, Rick Gerding, Shanti Randall, Shawn Mann, Thomas Diener, Victoria Miskolczy, Simon Oswell
- Violin – Alan Grunfeld, Amy Hershberger, Ana Landauer, Anatoly Rosinsky, Bruce Dukov, Dimitrie Leivici, Eric Hosler, Eun-Mee Ahn, Franklyn D'Antonio, Helen Nightengale, Irina Voloshina, Jay Rosen, Joel Derouin, Katia Popov, Kenneth Yerke, Liane Mautner, Lisa Sutton, Marc Sazer, Mark Robertson, Miran Kojian, Phillip Levy, Rafael Rishik, Roberto Cani, Robin Olson, Roger Wilkie, Sara Parkins, Sungil Lee, Tamara Hatwan, Julie Ann Gigante

Choir

- Choir – The Hollywood Film Chorale
- Vocal contractor – Sally Stevens
- Alto vocals – Ann White, Bobbi Page, Debbie Hall Gleason, Donna Medine, Luana Jackman, Melissa Mackay, Petra Haden
- Soprano vocals – Diane Reynolds, Jenny Graham, Joanna Bushnell, Linda Harmon, Sally Stevens, Sandie Hall Brooks, Susie Logan, Teri Kolde
- Tenor vocals – Agostino Castagnola, Amick Byram, Dick Wells, Dwayne Condon, Guy Maeda, John Beeney, John West, Oren Waters, Rick Logan, Walt Harrah

== Accolades ==
Accolades for I, Robot (Original Motion Picture Soundtrack)
Award	Category	Result	Ref.
International Film Music Critics Association	Best Original Score for a Fantasy/Science Fiction/Horror Film	Won	
