= Legend of the Guardians: The Owls of Ga'Hoole (soundtrack) =

2010 film soundtrack album

Legend of the Guardians: The Owls of Ga'Hoole (Original Motion Picture Soundtrack)

Soundtrack album by David Hirschfelder
- Released: September 21, 2010
- Recorded: 2010
- Studios: Simon Leadley Scoring Stage, Trackdown Studios, Sydney
- Genre: Film soundtrack
- Length: 64:12
- Label: WaterTower Music
- Producer: David Hirschfelder

David Hirschfelder chronology
I Love You Too (2010)	Legend of the Guardians: The Owls of Ga'Hoole (2010)	Sanctum (2011)

Legend of the Guardians: The Owls of Ga'Hoole (Original Motion Picture Soundtrack) is the soundtrack album to the 2010 animated fantasy adventure film Legend of the Guardians: The Owls of Ga'Hoole directed by Zack Snyder. The original score is composed by David Hirschfelder and released through WaterTower Music on September 21, 2010. The album featured the original song "To the Sky" by Owl City which preceded as the single on August 24, 2010.

== Reception ==
James Southall of Movie Wave wrote "Maybe there's a temptation to overrate it just because it's so unusual to hear something like this – but then again, it's so big-hearted, it's orchestrated so well and it's just so enjoyable, it's very hard to think of a reason not to recommend it." Christian Clemmensen of Filmtracks wrote "despite these album issues and the score's familiarity, Hirschfelder has delivered a satisfying success". Stephen Farber of The Hollywood Reporter wrote "The lush musical score by David Hirschfelder enhances the movie's shifting moods of terror and exaltation." Dylan Chester of The Film Stage wrote "David Hirschfelder's score is so strong it's extremely disappointing to see the film give into a pop song." Cinenerd of Blogcritics called it a "bombastic score".

== Track listing ==
No.	Title	Length
1.	"To the Sky" (Owl City)	3:39
2.	"Flight Home (The Guardian Theme)"	3:51
3.	"Taken to Saint Aegolius"	5:37
4.	"Welcome to the Pellatorium"	4:51
5.	"A Long Way to the Guardians"	5:57
6.	"You Know We're Flying"	2:37
7.	"A Friend or Two"	5:18
8.	"The Boy Was Right"	4:04
9.	"Sharpen the Battle Claws"	6:22
10.	"Follow the Whale's Fin"	5:11
11.	"Into Battle"	5:07
12.	"Hello Brother"	2:51
13.	"My Soldiers, My Sons"	3:27
14.	"More Baggy Wrinkles"	3:19
Total length:		1:02:11

== Personnel ==
Credits adapted from WaterTower Music:

- Score coordinator: Peter Hoyland
- Orchestrations: Ricky Edwards, James K. Lee
- Conductor: Brett Kelly
- Music editor: Jason Fernandez
- Orchestral contractor: Alex Henery
- Score recorded and mixed at: Gerry O'Riordan
- ADR and score recorded and mixed at: The Simon Leadley Scoring Stage, Trackdown Studios, Sydney
- Studio manager: Elaine Beckett
- Floor managers: Ewan Mitchell, Nicholas Rowse
- Score recordist: Daniel Brown
- Assistant engineer: James Ezra
- Music editors: Tim Ryan, Craig Beckett
- Re-recording studio, digital film recording and laboratory services: Deluxe Australia
- Re-recording manager: Angus Robertson
- Re-recording engineers: Glenn Bulter, Sam Hayward
- Facilities manager: Anthos Simon
- Film recording manager: Simon Albery
- Client liaison: Nathan Smith

== Accolades ==
Awards	Category	Recipient(s) and nominee(s)	Result	Ref.
AACTA Awards	Best Original Music Score	David Hirschfelder	Nominated	
Annie Awards	Music in a Feature Production	David Hirschfelder	Nominated	
APRA Music Awards	Feature Film Score of the Year	David Hirschfelder	Nominated	
Australian Screen Sound Guild	Feature Film Soundtrack of the Year	Legend of the Guardians: The Owls of Ga'Hoole	Nominated	
International Film Music Critics Association	Best Original Score for an Animated Film	David Hirschfelder	Nominated	
Inside Film Awards	Best Sound	Wayne Pashley, Polly McKinnon, Derryn Pasquill and Fabian Sanjurjo	Won	
Inside Film Awards	Best Music	David Hirschfelder	Nominated	
