= Jumper (soundtrack) =

2008 film soundtrack album

Jumper (Original Motion Picture Soundtrack)

Film score by John Powell
- Released: February 12, 2008
- Recorded: 2007–2008
- Studios: Trackdown Scoring Stage, Trackdown Studios, Sydney; 5 Cat Studios, Los Angeles, California; Remote Control Productions, Santa Monica, California
- Genre: Film score
- Length: 44:19
- Label: Lakeshore Records
- Producer: John Powell

John Powell chronology
P.S. I Love You (2007)	Jumper (2008)	Horton Hears a Who! (2008)

Jumper (Original Motion Picture Soundtrack) is the film score composed by John Powell to the 2008 science fiction action film Jumper directed by Doug Liman. The score was conducted by Brett Weymark and performed by the Sydney Symphony Orchestra. It was released through Lakeshore Records on February 12, 2008.

== Background ==
The musical score to Jumper was composed by John Powell, who previously worked with Doug Liman on The Bourne Identity (2002) and Mr. & Mrs. Smith (2005). The score was recorded predominantly in Sydney and sparsely in California for the mixing. The score was conducted by Brett Weymark and performed by the Sydney Symphony Orchestra. The album was released through Lakeshore Records on February 12, 2008.

== Reception ==
William Ruhlmann of AllMusic wrote "there must not be too many moments for the audience to catch its breath in Jumper, since Powell's short cues usually sound like they are accompanying frenetic action. The soundtrack comes off as efficient, if unimaginative." Thomas Simpson of Soundtrack.Net wrote "works with the film, but not on its own. But that's not to say Powell doesn't have more tricks up his sleeves with forthcoming scores. We all have bad days and produce work that isn't always top-notch, in this case, this is Powell's feel."

Filmtracks wrote "For writing one of the best jazzy themes you'll ever hear in an unexpected place in cinema, Powell achieves a three star rating, but the rest of it screams of a large crew attempting way too hard to give the score a unique sound without regard to the bigger picture." Jonathan Broxton of Movie Music UK wrote "Jumper is certainly not one of Powell's best scores – it's not even his best score of 2008 – but it still is worth checking out, especially for Bourne fans." Thomas Glorieux of Maintitles wrote "Jumper's nothing remotely spectacular. But it can entertain my thirst for about its duration. Sadly, the game version received a more memorable score instead (of Chris Tilton by the way). Just so you know."

ReadJunk.com-based critic "As far as the score is concerned, I'm kind of disappointed in it because I thought it would have been more thematic like the Bourne scores or something. The Jumper score was fairly quiet and not that exciting. It seemed more like background noise than anything. Towards the end it got a little more exciting but as a whole, I wouldn't want to listen to this again. I just wish John Powell did this score differently. Maybe I'll like this once I see Jumper?" Manohla Dargis of The New York Times and Brian Lowry of Variety being "bombastic" and "action-packed".

== Track listing ==
No.	Title	Length
1.	"My Day So Far"	1:03
2.	"Splash"	1:31
3.	"First Jumps"	1:37
4.	"Bridges, Rules, Banking"	3:25
5.	"Surf's Up"	1:12
6.	"1000 Volts"	3:48
7.	"Roland Snoops"	1:43
8.	"You Hear Me Laughing"	1:01
9.	"Coliseum Tour"	1:47
10.	"Coliseum Fight"	2:25
11.	"Echo of Mom"	0:50
12.	"Airport Departure"	1:58
13.	"In Hospital"	0:56
14.	"It's Sayonara"	0:57
15.	"Race to Millie"	1:25
16.	"David Comes Clean"	3:24
17.	"Roland at the Lair"	4:55
18.	"Jumper vs. Jumper"	2:18
19.	"The Sacrifice"	4:45
20.	"A Head Start"	1:43
21.	"A Jump Off"	1:36
Total length:		44:19

== Personnel ==
Credits adapted from liner notes:

- Music composer, producer, compiler and guitar – John Powell
- Additional music and programming – James McKee Smith, John Ashton Thomas
- Drums – Burly Sacape
- Performer – The Sydney Scoring Orchestra
- Orchestrators – Bryce Jacobs, Daniel Baker, James K. Lee, Jessica Wells
- Concertmaster – Fiona Ziegler
- Orchestra conductor – Brett Weymark
- Orchestra contractor – Alex Henery
- Engineer – Matt Ward
- Assistant engineer – Alex Stewart, Craig Beckett, James Ezra
- Executive producer – Brian McNelis, Skip Williamson
- Recording – Tim Ryan
- Additional recording – Dan Lerner
- Digital recordist – Daniel Brown
- Mixing – Shawn Murphy
- Music editor – Tom Carlson
- Score editor – Daniel Lerner, Germaine Franco, David Channing, Erik Swanson
- Music supervisor – Julianne Jordan
- Production coordinator – Rebecca Morellato, Germaine Franco
- Music coordinator – Andrew Richards
- Copyist – Jigsaw Music
- A&R – Eric Craig
- Art direction – Stephanie Mente
- Layout – Joe Chavez
- Music business affairs for 20th Century Fox – Tom Cavanaugh
- Executive in charge of music for 20th Century Fox – Robert Kraft
- Studio manager for Remote Control Productions – Czarina Russell
- Studio manager for Trackdown Digital – Elaine Beckett, Sue Taylor
- Music production supervisor for 20th Century Fox – Mike Knobloch

== Accolades ==
Award	Category	Recipient	Result	Ref.
International Film Music Critics Association	International Film Music Critics Association Award for Best Original Score for an Action/Adventure Film	John Powell	Won	
Saturn Award	Best Music	John Powell	Nominated	
