= Hellboy (2004 soundtrack) =

Hellboy (Original Motion Picture Soundtrack)

Film score by Marco Beltrami
- Released: April 6, 2004
- Recorded: 2003–2004
- Studios: Skywalker Sound, Los Angeles
- Genre: Film score
- Length: 44:58
- Label: Varèse Sarabande
- Producer: Marco Beltrami

Marco Beltrami chronology
Terminator 3: Rise of the Machines (2003)	Hellboy (Original Motion Picture Soundtrack) (2004)	I, Robot (2004)

Hellboy (Original Motion Picture Soundtrack) is the film score to the 2004 film Hellboy directed by Guillermo del Toro based on the Dark Horse Comics character of the same name, created by Mike Mignola. Starring Ron Perlman as the titular superhero, it is the first live-action film in the Hellboy franchise. The film score is composed by Marco Beltrami and recorded at the Skywalker Sound in Los Angeles with the Skywalker Symphony Orchestra performing the score conducted by Beltrami and Pete Anthony. Varèse Sarabande released the score album on April 6, 2004.

== Development ==
Marco Beltrami composed the film score in his third collaboration with Mimic (1997) and Blade II (2002). Beltrami admitted that Hellboy is kind of a dark character but denied the dark musical approach and instead worked on his own style, not emulating the comic book themes. On his first meeting with del Toro when they were filming in Prague, del Toro told him that he wanted the score to feel very operatic. When Beltrami saw the final edit, the approach seemed to fit very well because all the characters are strong and each warrant their own themes. Each scene in the film is based on some thematic element or combination of element. By this approach, Beltrami had crafted around six themes.

Beltrami initially planned to score in Prague, but since the place was not suited to do an operatic and electronic score, he eventually recorded at the Skywalker Sound scoring stage in Los Angeles. Beltrami relied on incorporating electric sounds which are technically a bit behind due to the time constraints. Beltrami added that the electronics are mainly included to supplement the cues, and there were no standalone electronic tracks. Instead, around 60 tracks of different electronic sounds used in conjunction with the orchestra. In the main theme, Beltrami used a baritone guitar heavily manipulated by taking the physical sounds and manipulating them with electronics and use it in conjunction with the real sounds. Due to the budget constraints, Beltrami dropped the idea of using Tibetan monk throat singers and instead used low male choir stuff supplemented with electronic sounds on the cue "Snowalkers".

== Release ==
Hellboy (Original Motion Picture Soundtrack) was released through Varèse Sarabande on April 6, 2004. A deluxe edition of the album featuring 120 minutes of the complete score was released on September 19, 2016, through Varèse Sarabande in a limited 3,000 physical copies. A vinyl edition of the soundtrack released in "Red" and "Blue with Black Smoke" LPs on July 13, 2018.

== Track listing ==
=== Standard edition ===
No.	Title	Length
1.	"Oct. 7th, 1944"	1:17
2.	"Meet Hellboy"	1:29
3.	"Main Title"	1:08
4.	"Snow Walkers"	2:24
5.	"Liz Sherman"	2:28
6.	"Fireproof"	1:34
7.	"Rooftop Tango"	1:13
8.	"Wake Up Dead"	3:20
9.	"Evil Doers"	2:45
10.	"Kroenen's Lied"	1:59
11.	"Father's Funeral"	2:04
12.	"Alley Fight"	3:13
13.	"Nazis"	2:42
14.	"Investigating Liz"	3:24
15.	"Abe Sapien"	1:27
16.	"Mechanical Mausoleum"	0:42
17.	"Soul Sucker"	3:31
18.	"Stand By Your Man"	2:34
19.	"Hellboy & Liz"	2:46
20.	"B.P.R.D."	2:58
Total length:		44:58

=== Deluxe edition ===
Disc 1
No.	Title	Length
1.	"Broom Sets Us Up"	2:44
2.	"Evil Doers"	3:55
3.	"Fight"	2:04
4.	"Meet Hellboy"	3:41
5.	"Main Title"	1:09
6.	"Snow Walkers"	2:24
7.	"Brooms Fate"	0:40
8.	"B.P.R.D"	1:00
9.	"Meeting Abe"	0:52
10.	"Where Am I"	1:43
11.	"Hellboy's Lair"	2:14
12.	"Hellboy Meets Sam"	4:17
13.	"Alley Fight"	3:17
14.	"Fireproof"	2:47
15.	"Hellboy Stalks Liz"	1:10
16.	"Fishsticks Flashback"	5:24
17.	"Hellboy and Liz"	2:36
18.	"Investigating Liz"	2:07
19.	"Fire in the Hole"	1:29
20.	"Pure of Heart"	1:14
21.	"For the Rotten Eggs"	3:57
22.	"John and Liz"	1:28
23.	"Sam Sees Fishsticks"	1:29
24.	"Sam Gets Ahead"	1:07
25.	"Horny"	1:50
26.	"It Will Be Quick"	0:32
27.	"Hellboy Vs. Sam the 2nd"	6:36
Total length:		63:46

Disc 2
No.	Title	Length
1.	"Fish Boil"	2:02
2.	"Autopsy Music"	1:23
3.	"Rooftop Tango"	2:31
4.	"Kroenen Arise"	0:53
5.	"Cookies and Stones"	1:20
6.	"Tango with Milk and Cookies and Small Rocks"	1:24
7.	"Feelings"	2:09
8.	"Abe's Advice"	3:05
9.	"Live Cargo"	0:35
10.	"Wake Up Dead"	3:28
11.	"Mechanical Mauseleum"	3:09
12.	"Kroenen's Lied"	2:00
13.	"Kroenen Korner"	2:50
14.	"Light My Fire"	4:22
15.	"Soul Sucker"	3:42
16.	"Aw, Crap"	4:04
17.	"Stand By Your Man"	1:20
18.	"Gut Grenade"	2:54
19.	"A Hot Kiss"	2:45
20.	"B.P.R.D. Suite"	6:57
21.	"Oompa"	2:58
22.	"Evil Dewars"	2:45
Total length:		58:36

== Reception ==
Christian Clemmensen of Filmtracks wrote "On album, Hellboy is a well-balanced 45 minutes. For film score enthusiasts waiting to hear Beltrami apply his orchestral talents to both majestic and quirky ends, this album is your chance to hear just that. An impressive comic hero's score." Jonathan Broxton of Movie Music UK wrote "Hellboy is not a huge departure from previous films in genre terms, but in respect to the music, Hellboy shows a whole new level of maturity, thematic excellence and dramatic sense that will surely – finally – see him shaking off the shackles of typecasting." Thomas Glorieux of Maintitles wrote "Hellboy is brilliant if you ever hear it in full. Only then will you realize that Beltrami created a brilliant colorful score for a dark comic book genre, and an unlikely hero named Hellboy."

Mark Hockley of Music Web International wrote "Marco Beltrami continues to write scores in the tradition of the Godfather of modern film music, Bernard Herrmann and he is going from strength to strength. I think after several listens to Hellboy that this soundtrack will become a firm favourite with not only fans of horror/fantasy scores but all admirers of outstanding film music. A major leap up the A-list ladder for Marco and here's hoping that he continues to climb to the very top." Johnny Loftus of AllMusic wrote "Marco Beltrami's score eschews genre constriction in favor of a rich palette of color, pacing, and emotion." Sean Wilson of Mfiles called it "a brilliantly eclectic superhero score, thoroughly old fashioned yet bracingly modern, doing the impossible in film music: maintaining a consistent tone in spite of the humour, heroism and danger also on display."

Calling it as one of the best superhero film scores, Oily Harris of Comic Book Resources mentioned the scores of both this film and the sequel Hellboy II: The Golden Army (2008), adding that both Beltrami and Danny Elfman "do a great job of creating a dark gothic atmosphere, and it really enhances the moody visuals of the films" capturing Hellboy's world.

== Personnel credits ==
Credits adapted from liner notes:

- Music composer and producer – Marco Beltrami
- Synth design – Buck Sanders
- Recording and mixing – John Kurlander, Dann Thompson, Judy Kirschner
- Mastering – Erick Labson
- Score editor – Final Note Productions
- Pro-tools operator – Andre Zweers
- Executive producer – Robert Townson
- Music preparation – Jo Ann Kane Services
- Executive in charge of music for Revolution Studios – Denise Luiso
- Executive in charge of music for Sony Pictures – Lia Vollack

Orchestra

- Orchestra – The Skywalker Symphony Orchestra
- Orchestration – Bill Boston, Carlos Rodriguez, Ceiri Torjussen, Chris Guardino, Jon Kull, Marco Beltrami, Marcus Trumpp, Pete Anthony, Randy Kerber
- Conductor – Marco Beltrami, Pete Anthony
- Orchestra contractor – Janet Ketchum
- Concertmistress – Kay Stern

Instruments

- Balalaika – Clark Welsh
- Bass – Chris Gilbert, Ken Miller, Ruth Davies, William Everett, Laurence Epstein, Stephen Tramontozzi
- Bassoon – Gregory Barber, Steven Braunstein
- Cello – Anne Pinsker, Emil Miland, Hugh Livingston, Jeffrey Watson, Jill Brindel, Miriam Perkoff, Nina G. Flyer, Teressa Adams, Barbara Bogatin, Thalia Moore
- Clarinet – Clark Fobes, Mark Shannon, Carey Bell
- Flute – Julie McKenzie, Stephanie McNab, Janet Ketchum
- Harp – Dan Levitan
- Horn – Christopher Cooper, Doug Hull, Eric Achen, Jonathan Ring, Susanna Manzo, Bruce Roberts
- Oboe – Deborah Henry
- Percussion – James Lee Wyatt III, Kent Reed, Raymond Froehlich, Arthur Storch
- Piano – Marc Shapiro
- Theremin – Robby Virus
- Timpani – David Herbert
- Trombone – David Ridge, Jeffrey Budin, Paul Welcomer, Thomas Hornig
- Trumpet – Ronald Blais, Glenn Fischtahl, John Pearson
- Tuba – Peter Wahrhaftig
- Viola – Anna Kruger, David Gaudry, Gina Feinauer, Jonna Hervig, Kathrine Johnk, Nancy Ellis, Pamela Freund-Striplen, Patricia Heller, Phyllis Kamrin, Wieslaw Pogorzelski, Donald Ehrlich
- Violin – Adrienne Herbert, Amy Hiraga, Barbara Riccardi, Chunming Kobialka, Connie Gantsweg, Daniel Kobialka, Deborah Price, Diane Nicholeris, Ellen Pesavento, Florin Parvulescu, Irene Sazer, Jeremy Cohen, Jeremy Constant, Kayo Miki, Kelly Leon-Pearce, Kineko Barbini, Kum Mo Kim, Mariko Smiley, Mark Volkert, Melissa Kleinbart, Nadya Tichman, Philip Santos, Sara Usher, Sarn Oliver, Suzanne Leon, Victor Romasevich, William Barbini, Yasushi Ogura, Zoya Leybin, Dan Smiley, Dawn Dover

Choir

- Choir contractor – Desirée Goyette
- Vocals – Chad Runyon, Dana Anderson, Dawn Fintor, Deborah Benedict, Dennis Yugo, Desiree Goyette, Ed Bogas, Elspeth Franks, Heidi Waterman, Jane Hammett, Jennifer Youngdahl, Julianne Booth, Kathryn Nymoen, Mel McMurrin, Thomas Truhitte
