= Max Payne (soundtrack) =

Max Payne (Original Motion Picture Soundtrack)

Film score by Marco Beltrami and Buck Sanders
- Released: October 21, 2008
- Recorded: 2008
- Studios: Newman Scoring Stage, 20th Century Fox Studios, Los Angeles; The Village, Los Angeles
- Genre: Film score
- Length: 44:39
- Labels: Fox Music; La-La Land Records
- Producers: Marco Beltrami; Buck Sanders; Pete Anthony

Marco Beltrami chronology
The Eye (2008)	Max Payne (2008)	Amusement (2008)

Buck Sanders chronology
Highway 395 (2000)	Max Payne (2008)	The Hurt Locker (2009)

Max Payne (Original Motion Picture Soundtrack) is the film score to the 2008 film Max Payne directed by John Moore, based on the video game series of the same name and stars Mark Wahlberg as the title character. The film score is composed by Marco Beltrami and Buck Sanders and released through Fox Music and La-La Land Records on October 21, 2008.

== Background ==
Marco Beltrami composed the film score in his third collaboration with Moore after Flight of the Phoenix (2004). Buck Sanders, an assistant of Beltrami also co-composed the score. Beltrami used detuned piano and violin to provide electroacoustic sounds.

== Release ==
The album was released through Fox Music and La-La Land Records on October 21, 2008, four days after the film's release.

== Reception ==
William Ruhlmann of AllMusic wrote "Beltrami, a student of Jerry Goldsmith, knows both Hollywood traditions and the demands of the contemporary action genre." Cullen from SciFiPulse thought the score was dark and haunting, hoping the movie would live up to the soundtrack. He rated the album an eight out of ten, saying "The detuned piano really adds that sense of depth to the proceedings and makes every single track on the CD stand out."

Mark Oakley of Den of Geek wrote "for a tenner this is definitely worth fans of sci-fi and fantasy action flicks seeking out. It's a very stylish and slick listen." Bill Gibron of PopMatters wrote "the score for Payne is a series of orchestral farts followed up by unnecessary techno lifts from The Matrix and any other implausible predictable post-modern thriller. Instead of setting a mood and atmosphere, Beltrami gets in, passes a little symphonic gas, and then disappears into the filmmaking firmament. None of the tracks are memorable here [...] It's instantly forgettable – which in many ways reflects the feature film experience flawlessly." A. O. Scott of The New York Times also considered the music to be "forgettable".

== Track listing ==
No.	Title	Length
1.	"Max Attacks"	3:53
2.	"Investigation"	3:29
3.	"Payneful Piano"	2:16
4.	"Colvin Quivers"	3:33
5.	"Dethlab"	2:32
6.	"Storming the Office"	1:53
7.	"No Respects for You"	2:37
8.	"Lupino Spreads His Wings"	1:50
9.	"Max Returns Home"	2:03
10.	"Factoring Max"	1:47
11.	"Window Payne"	3:32
12.	"Dark Haven"	2:47
13.	"Vote for Dennis"	2:05
14.	"BB's Maxim"	2:46
15.	"Max Marches On"	2:23
16.	"Heaven to the Max"	1:46
17.	"Topless Fanfare"	3:10
Total length:		44:22

== Personnel ==
Credits adapted from liner notes:

- Music composers – Marco Beltrami, Buck Sanders
- Producers – Marco Beltrami, Buck Sanders, Pete Anthony
- Additional music – Dennis Smith
- Engineer – Denis St. Amand
- Recording – John Kurlander, Tim Lauber, Jamie Steele
- Mixing – John Kurlander
- Score editor – Alex Gibson, Jamie Steele
- Assistant score editor – Denise Okimoto
- Music preparation – JoAnn Kane Music Services, Mark Graham
- Executive producer – Matt Verboys
- Liner notes – John Moore, Marco Beltrami
- Art direction – Mark Banning

Orchestra

- Orchestra – The Hollywood Studio Symphony
- Orchestration – Pete Anthony, Bill Boston, Dana Niu, Marcus Trumpp, Rossano Galante, Dennis Smith
- Conductor – Pete Anthony
- Orchestra contractor – Peter Rotter, Sandy De Crescent
- Stage manager – Francesco Perlangeli, Tom Steel
- Concertmaster – Endre Granat

Instruments

- Bass – Michael Valerio, Oscar Hidalgo, Nico Abondolo
- Cello – Armen Ksajikian, Dennis Karmazyn, Paula Hochhalter, Steve Erdody
- Harp – Jo Ann Turovsky, Marcia Dickstein
- Horn – Brian O'Connor, David Duke, Paul Klintworth, James Thatcher
- Percussion – Alan Estes, Peter Limonick, Wade Culbreath
- Trombone – Alexander Iles, Robert Sanders, George Thatcher, Alan Kaplan
- Viola – Andrew Duckles, Darrin Mc Cann, Robert Brophy, Brian Dembow
- Violin – Alyssa Park, Darius Campo, Irina Voloshina, Jacqueline Brand, Julie Ann Gigante, Kevin Connolly, Phillip Levy, Rafael Rishik, Roberto Cani, Roger Wilkie, Sarah Thornblade, Serena Mc Kinney, Tereza Stanislav

Management

- Music business and legal affairs for Twentieth Century Fox – Tom Cavanaugh
- Executive in charge of music for Twentieth Century Fox – Robert Kraft
- Music production coordinator for Twentieth Century Fox – Rebecca Morellato
- Music supervisor for Twentieth Century Fox – Mike Knobloch
