= Free Solo (soundtrack) =

Free Solo (National Geographic Original Motion Picture Soundtrack)

Film score by Marco Beltrami
- Released: November 9, 2018
- Genre: Film score
- Length: 39:57
- Label: Node Records
- Producer: Marco Beltrami

Marco Beltrami chronology
A Quiet Place (2018)	Sicario: Day of the Soldado (2018)	Velvet Buzzsaw (2019)

Free Solo (National Geographic Original Motion Picture Soundtrack) is the soundtrack album to the 2018 National Geographic documentary film Free Solo directed by Elizabeth Chai Vasarhelyi and Jimmy Chin, that profiles rock climber Alex Honnold on his quest to perform the first-ever free solo climb of a route on El Capitan, in Yosemite National Park in California, in June 2017. Marco Beltrami composed the film score and was released through Node Records on November 9, 2018.

== Development ==
Marco Beltrami composed the score, who found the documentary to be " the most petrifying project of his career in the unlikeliest of places". He found Honnold's story to be gripping and putting in his shoes, being just insane. Describing Honnold as an "interesting character" who gets all of his life from climbing, which is also the thing that could kill him. this was the "yin and yang thing that's perpetually going through the movie" and wanted it to represent musically.

Beltrami who treated each film as a puzzle needed to be cracked, in terms of film scoring, considered it a mysterious process and in the case of Free Solo, two keys unlocked the puzzle. One was to summon the majesty El Capitan and the other, to dwell into the complexity of Honnold rendering the basic paradox of his resistance in the musical form.

Tim McGraw performed the song "Gravity" which he shared writing credits with Lori McKenna. The song was released under the Sony Music Entertainment label on November 1, 2018.

== Track listing ==
No.	Title	Length
1.	"Main Title & Yosemite Valley"	4:41
2.	"Freerider"	3:27
3.	"The L Word"	2:05
4.	"The Sanni Challenge"	2:14
5.	"Morocco"	2:03
6.	"Too Many Deaths"	1:20
7.	"Tommy Caldwell"	1:14
8.	"Teflon Corner"	2:11
9.	"Working The Boulder Problem"	1:53
10.	"Free Haircut"	1:13
11.	"Mental Climbing"	1:52
12.	"Alex & Sanni"	1:27
13.	"Home Shopping"	1:17
14.	"Warrior Mentality"	1:29
15.	"Ueli Dies"	3:48
16.	"Sayonara Sanni"	1:30
17.	"June 3rd, 2017"	3:39
18.	"Huge Stones"	6:47
19.	"7,573'"	5:49
Total length:		49:59

== Reception ==
Peter Debruge of Variety and Keith Uhlich of The Hollywood Reporter called it "pulse-quickening" and "soaring". Peter Travers of Rolling Stone noted "pumped by Marco Beltrami's score and your own adrenaline, you feel every spectacular moment." Katherine Laidlaw of The Globe and Mail wrote "You could pause here to consider this, if Marco Beltrami's deft scoring would allow you to take a rest. Instead, the music keeps our emotions moving at a steady pace, winding through moods at turns thrilling, inspiring, fearful, fretful and frustrating."

== Accolades ==
Award	Date of ceremony	Category	Recipient(s) and nominee(s)	Result	Ref(s)
Hollywood Music in Media Awards	November 14, 2018	Original Score – Documentary	Marco Beltrami	Nominated	
Hollywood Music in Media Awards	November 14, 2018	Original Song – Documentary	"Gravity" – Tim McGraw and Lori McKenna	Nominated	
Cinema Eye Honors	January 10, 2019	Outstanding Achievement in Original Music Score	Marco Beltrami	Nominated	
Primetime Emmy Awards	September 14, 2019	Outstanding Music Composition for a Documentary Series or Special (Original Dramatic Score)	Marco Beltrami and Brandon Roberts	Won	
