= A Quiet Place (soundtrack) =

A Quiet Place (Music from the Motion Picture)

Film score by Marco Beltrami
- Released: April 6, 2018
- Genre: Film score
- Length: 48:08
- Label: Milan
- Producer: Marco Beltrami

Marco Beltrami chronology
The Snowman (2017)	A Quiet Place (2018)	Free Solo (2018)

A Quiet Place (Music from the Motion Picture) is the soundtrack to the 2018 film of the same name directed by John Krasinski. Featuring musical score composed by Marco Beltrami, the soundtrack was released under the Milan Records label on April 6, 2018.

== Development ==
Marco Beltrami had composed the musical score for A Quiet Place. He signed the film over the occasion of Thanksgiving (November 23, 2017) and was set to compose the score by early-January 2018 in a short span of time while Beltrami was also scoring the National Geographic Films documentary Free Solo. Due to the film's limited budget, Beltrami refrained from using a full-fledged orchestra for recording as "the film is truly intimate and contained". He used a small ensemble of 30 musicians which involved strings and piano and extensively manipulated and processed the score "so that we could create sounds that were semi-orchestral and semi-electronic".

The initial blueprint for the original score came from Krasinski's passion for the cover version of David Bowie's "Heroes" by Peter Gabriel. Krasinski played the song to Beltrami while scoring the film and it became the basis of the score to Beltrami. He composed a family theme and sent to Krasinski which he liked it and eventually included into the edit. For the sound-hunting creatures, he wanted to come up with "a signature monster sound, something we haven't heard before that instills fear, even if the monster isn't onscreen". This resulted in the opening theme "It Hears You". Beltrami felt recording the final cue was difficult to him, as "when they realize that they can kill the monsters and the monsters are racing toward them, that cue was really crucial to the process [...] Once I solved that, everything else fell into place. It's not a melodic cue, but it's a driving force which led to the monster cue."

Most of the score had been excluded from the film, which Krasinski found impactful having the score dominated the scenes. Beltrami provided supervising sound editors Erik Aadahl and Ethan Van der Ryn music to work in a way that would not interfere with the sound design throughout the film.

== Release ==
The soundtrack to A Quiet Place was released under the Milan Records label on April 6, 2018. A vinyl edition of the soundtrack was released through Mondo and Death Waltz Recording Company on July 11, 2018.

== Critical reception ==
Eric Kohn of IndieWire wrote "Marco Beltrami's score largely sticks to a low rumble that hovers on the same wavelength as the characters' unease." Sandy Schaefer of Screen Rant wrote "Marco Beltrami's ominous score certainly help to set the mood throughout its runtime." Tom Shone of The Times described the score as "fussy and over-funereal". Peter Travers of Rolling Stone felt that "Only the score by Marco Beltrami seems too much, since A Quiet Place works best when it sneaks up on you."

== Track listing ==
A Quiet Place (Music from the Motion Picture) track listing
No.	Title	Length
1.	"It Hears You"	4:28
2.	"A Quiet Family"	1:58
3.	"Children of the Corn"	1:24
4.	"A Quiet Life"	2:58
5.	"The Dinner Table"	1:46
6.	"Something on the Roof"	2:13
7.	"Babyproofing / Bonfire"	2:55
8.	"Old Man"	3:09
9.	"Labor Intensive"	8:13
10.	"Kids Bonfire"	1:36
11.	"Water in the Basement"	3:23
12.	"Silo Attack"	1:46
13.	"A Quiet Moment"	1:13
14.	"Rising Pulse"	4:14
15.	"All Together Now"	5:24
16.	"Positive Feedback"	1:28
Total length:		48:08

== Accolades ==
Accolades for A Quiet Place (Music from the Motion Picture)
Award	Date of ceremony	Category	Recipient(s)	Result	Ref(s).
Golden Globe Awards	January 6, 2019	Best Original Score	Marco Beltrami	Nominated	
Hollywood Music in Media Awards	November 14, 2018	Original Score – Sci-Fi/Fantasy/Horror Film	Marco Beltrami	Nominated	
