= The Thing (1982 soundtrack) =

1982 horror film soundtrack

The Thing (Original Motion Picture Soundtrack)

Film score by Ennio Morricone and John Carpenter
- Released: 1982
- Recorded: 1982
- Genres: Electronic; film score
- Length: 49:24
- Label: MCA Records
- Producer: Ennio Morricone

Ennio Morricone chronology
Nana, the True Key of Pleasure (1982)	The Thing (1982)	The Ruffian (1983)

John Carpenter chronology
Halloween (2018)	Lost Cues: The Thing (2020)	Lost Themes III: Alive After Death (2021)

Professional ratings
Review scores
Source	Rating
AllMusic	4/5 stars

The Thing (Original Motion Picture Soundtrack) is the soundtrack album to the 1982 horror film The Thing, directed by John Carpenter. Ennio Morricone and Carpenter serve as composers.

The album was released by MCA Records in 1982, in conjunction with the film's release.

== Development ==
In 1982, Ennio Morricone composed the score to The Thing, as the film's director John Carpenter wanted the film to have a European musical approach. Carpenter flew to Rome to speak with Morricone to convince him to take the job. By the time Morricone flew to Los Angeles to record the score, he had already developed a tape filled with an array of synthesizer music because he was unsure what type of score Carpenter wanted. Morricone wrote complete separate orchestral and synthesizer scores and a combined score, which he knew was Carpenter's preference. Carpenter picked a piece, closely resembling his own scores, that became the main theme used throughout the film. He also played the score from Escape from New York (1981) for Morricone as an example. Morricone made several more attempts, bringing the score closer to Carpenter's own style of music. In total, Morricone produced a score of approximately one hour that remained largely unused but was later released as part of the film's soundtrack. Carpenter and his longtime collaborator Alan Howarth separately developed some synth-styled pieces used in the film. In 2012, Morricone recalled:

I've asked [Carpenter], as he was preparing some electronic music with an assistant to edit on the film, "Why did you call me, if you want to do it on your own?" He surprised me, he said – "I got married to your music. This is why I've called you." ... Then when he showed me the film, later when I wrote the music, we didn't exchange ideas. He ran away, nearly ashamed of showing it to me. I wrote the music on my own without his advice. Naturally, as I had become quite clever since 1982, I've written several scores relating to my life. And I had written one, which was electronic music. And [Carpenter] took the electronic score.

Carpenter said:

[Morricone] did all the orchestrations and recorded for me 20 minutes of music I could use wherever I wished but without seeing any footage. I cut his music into the film and realized that there were places, mostly scenes of tension, in which his music would not work ... I secretly ran off and recorded in a couple of days a few pieces to use. My pieces were very simple electronic pieces – it was almost tones. It was not really music at all but just background sounds, something today you might even consider as sound effects.

MCA Records released the soundtrack for The Thing in 1982. Varèse Sarabande re-released it in 1991 on compact disc and Compact Cassette. These versions eventually ceased being manufactured. In 2011, Howarth and Larry Hopkins restored Morricone's score using updated digital techniques and arranged each track in the order it appears in the film. The album also includes tracks composed by Carpenter and Howarth for the film.

In December 2015, Quentin Tarantino confirmed that his film The Hateful Eight would use three unused tracks from Morricone's original soundtrack for The Thing—"Eternity", "Bestiality", and "Despair"—as Morricone was pressed for time while creating the score. A remastered version of the score was released on vinyl on February 23, 2017; a deluxe edition included an exclusive interview with Carpenter. In May 2020, an extended play (EP), Lost Cues: The Thing, was released. The EP contains Carpenter's contributions to The Thing's score; he re-recorded the music because the original masterings were lost.

== Track listing ==
All music is composed by Ennio Morricone.

The Thing (Original Motion Picture Soundtrack)
No.	Title	Length
1.	"Humanity, Pt. 1"	6:50
2.	"Shape"	3:16
3.	"Contamination"	1:02
4.	"Bestiality"	2:56
5.	"Solitude"	5:58
6.	"Eternity"	5:35
7.	"Wait"	6:22
8.	"Humanity, Pt. 2"	7:15
9.	"Sterilization"	5:12
10.	"Despair"	4:58
Total length:		49:24

== Personnel ==
- Ennio Morricone – Composer, conductor, primary artist, producer
- John Carpenter – Composer, production
- Amy Ross – Music coordinator
- Michael Rogers – Music supervisor
- Mickey Crofford – Engineer
- Neil Jack – Assistant engineer

== Reception ==
Andy Beta of Pitchfork gave the soundtrack a score of 7.2/10, writing "it's on this motif that the film's frost-tipped dread is most closely felt—so it's a shame that, after four minutes, it suddenly lurches back into an overstated organ theme." Richie Corelli of Horror DNA gave the soundtrack a 5/5 star rating, summarizing that "what matters is this: Ennio Morricone's music for John Carpenter's The Thing is an icy, alluring work of art. And for horror fans, it's an absolute classic." Chris McEneany of AVForums gave the album a positive review, saying "This is cold, bleak music with a dark sense of impending doom... yet it's also a shivery delight of spectral suspense and sepulchral beauty. Quite the best John Carpenter score that John Carpenter never wrote."

== Accolades ==
The film was nominated at the 3rd Golden Raspberry Awards for Worst Musical Score.

== See also ==
- The Thing (2011 soundtrack), the soundtrack album to the prequel of the same name
