= Mark Graham (orchestrator) =

Orchestrator and conductor

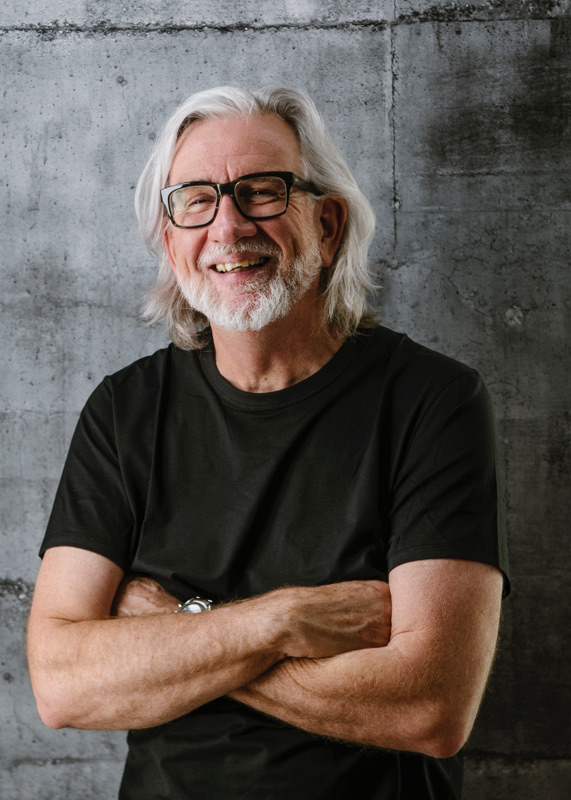
- Occupations: Orchestrator, conductor, collaborator
- Writing career
- Genres: Film scores, soundtracks
- Website: markgrahamcreative.com

Mark Graham is an orchestrator and conductor for film and television scores. He is the head of music preparation at JoAnn Kane Music Service. Graham has worked with composers such as James Newton Howard, John Williams, Alan Silvestri, Alexandre Desplat, John Debney, Howard Shore, Jerry Goldsmith, and Theodore Shapiro.

== Career ==
Mark Graham has orchestrated music for many films, including A Quiet Place, Solo: A Star Wars Story, Luck and Trumbo. Graham has worked with composer John Williams since 1998. He was a music copyist and librarian on three prequels of the Star Wars franchise, Star Wars: The Force Awakens and Star Wars: The Last Jedi.

Graham has worked with Alexandre Desplat as an orchestrator, conductor and music director for The Grand Budapest Hotel, an orchestrator for The Secret Life of Pets and the music librarian for Godzilla (2014).

Graham was an orchestrator for composer Alan Silvestri on Avengers: Infinity War and conducted the recording session at Abbey Road Studios. He was the music librarian for Silvestri's score to Night at the Museum: Battle of the Smithsonian.

In 2017, he conducted an 85-piece ensemble from the Hollywood Symphony Orchestra for Rob Simonsen's score to Going in Style.

Graham has been an orchestrator on many scores by composer Theodore Shapiro, including Ghostbusters (2016), Why Him?, Central Intelligence and The Eyes of Tammy Faye.

For composer John Debney, Graham has been a music librarian for Hotel for Dogs, and an orchestrator for Luck and Hocus Pocus 2. He was the head of music preparation for The Orville and The Jungle Book (2016 film).

Graham was the orchestrator for Dan Romer's score to the Pixar film Luca, and conducted the 82-piece orchestra that recorded the score at Fox's Newman Scoring Stage in 2021.

Many film scores have been adapted for orchestra as a live-to-picture format by Graham, including scores to Jaws, Skyfall, Back to the Future and the Harry Potter and Star Wars franchise. Graham's adaptation of Mark Knopfler's score to The Princess Bride was premiered at the Hollywood Bowl in 2021 by the Los Angeles Philharmonic.

In 2021, he began working with Robbie Robertson on the score to Killers of the Flower Moon. Throughout the scoring process, Robertson would record videos of him singing or playing guitar and send them to Graham for orchestration. On November 9, 2023, Graham conducted segments of music to film at Royce Hall on the University of California, Los Angeles campus as a part of Deadline's Sound & Screen concert.

In 2024, he worked with Pharrell Williams and produced "Double Life" that appeared in Despicable Me 4.

In 2025, he orchestrated and conducted the orchestral score for composers Kyle Dixon and Michael Stein on the series finale of Stranger Things, with Dan Romer.
