= Trackdown Digital =

Trackdown
- Industry: Audio post, Music production
- Founded: 1984; 42 years ago
- Founder: Simon Leadley; Geoff Watson
- Headquarters: Sydney, Australia
- Number of locations: Camperdown, Moore Park, South Melbourne
- Services: audio post, recording and music services
- Website: www.trackdown.com.au

Trackdown Digital is an independent Australian audio post and music services facility for the film, television, music, and multimedia industries.

== History ==
Trackdown began as a rehearsal and 4-track recording business called "The Studio" in Oxford Street, Sydney. It was one of Sydney's first rehearsal/demo studios and clients included INXS, Midnight Oil, Divinyls, Do Re Mi, The Church and Dragon.

In the late 1980s, the studio moved to Bondi Junction, to a couple of small rooms in the basement of Hutching's Keyboards where Simon Leadley created Sydney's first half-inch 16-track recording studio using the Fostex B16. The business was renamed Trackdown and was the first studio to use Sony's PCM701 digital 2-track system for the final master. In 1990, Trackdown built a new studio complex in Camperdown within the Yoram Gross Studio building.

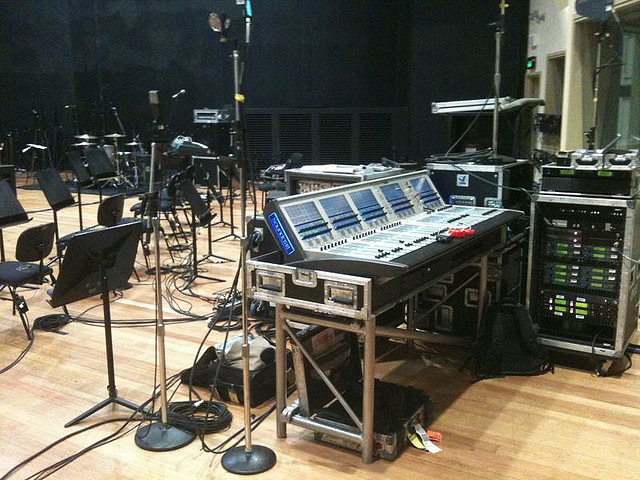
Trackdown Scoring Stage

Trackdown's Moore Park Studio, Building 125 (adjacent to Fox Studios), houses The Simon Leadley Scoring Stage, Mix one - Trackdown's 5.1 audio edit and music mixing suites – a Theatre, and production suites and offices for hire. In 2013 the services were expanded with the opening of Theatre One, in collaboration with Definition Films, "a 20-seat theatrette with grading, audio post, mixing, and 3D screening capabilities".

== People ==
- Geoff Watson - Managing Director
- Elaine Beckett - General Manager
- Simon Leadley - Trackdown Director and Leading Australian Music & Sound Craftsman – In memory of
- Tim Ryan - Supervising Music Editor
- Craig Beckett - Music Editor and Engineer
