= Buck Sanders =

American composer

Buck Henry Sanders (Mississippi, 1971) is an American composer.

Raised in South Carolina, Buck Sanders moved to Los Angeles in 1989 to pursue his career as a musician. He met Marco Beltrami and became his assistant in 1997, collaborating in the creation of numerous soundtracks, including that of The Hurt Locker, for which they received an Oscar nomination for the best soundtrack in 2010.
