= Marco Beltrami =

American composer (born 1966)

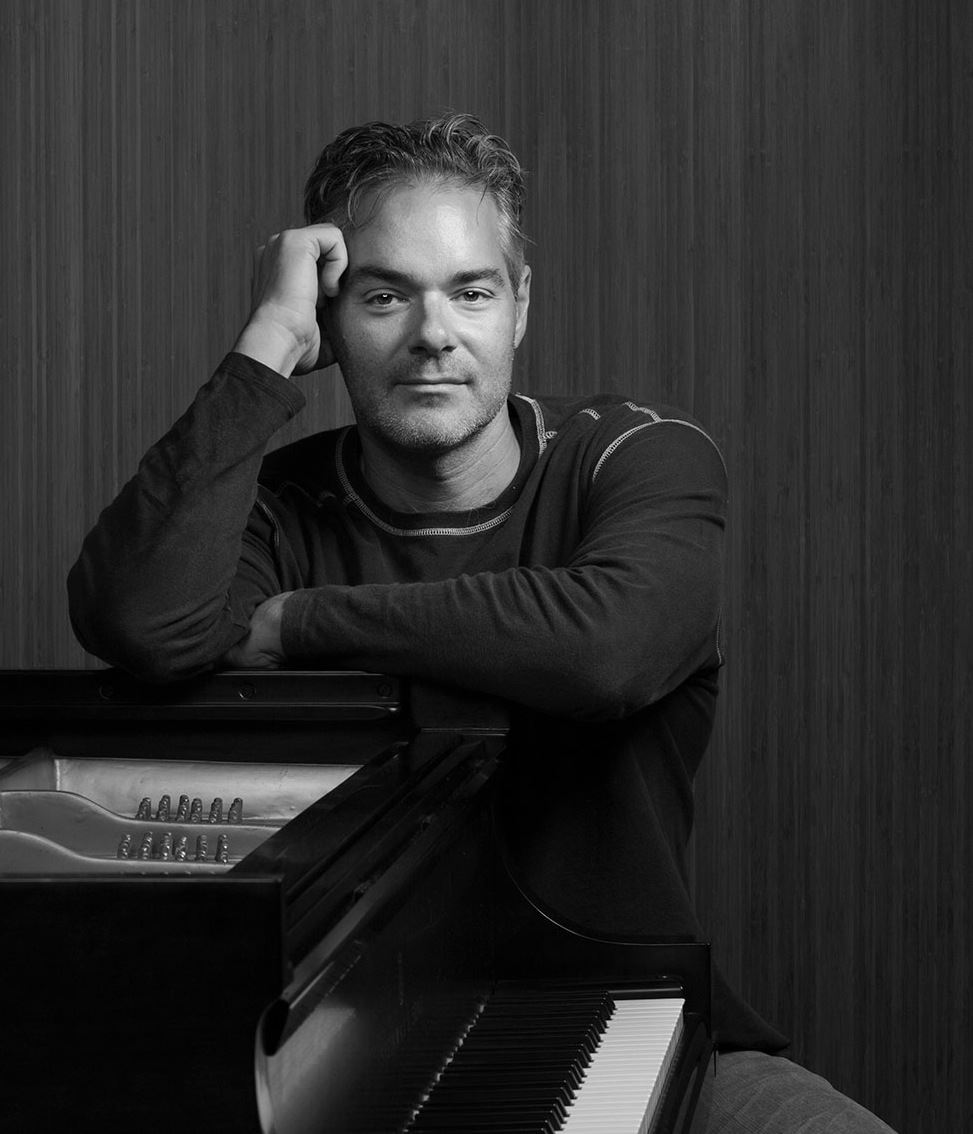
- Beltrami in 2020
- Born: October 7, 1966 (age 59); Long Island, New York, U.S.
- Education: Brown University; Yale School of Music; USC Thornton School of Music
- Musical career
- Genres: Film score
- Occupations: Composer, conductor
- Years active: 1994–present
- Website: marcobeltrami.com

Marco Beltrami (born October 7, 1966) is an American composer of film and television scores. He has worked in a number of genres, including horror (Scream, Mimic, The Faculty, Resident Evil, The Woman in Black, Carrie, A Quiet Place, the Fear Street trilogy, and The Nun II), action (Terminator 3: Rise of the Machines, Live Free or Die Hard, World War Z), science fiction (I, Robot; Snowpiercer), Western (3:10 to Yuma, Jonah Hex, The Homesman), and superhero (Blade II, Hellboy, Jonah Hex, The Wolverine, Fantastic Four, Logan, Venom: Let There Be Carnage).

A long-time collaborator of Wes Craven, Beltrami scored seven of the director's films including the original four Craven-directed films in the Scream franchise (1996–2011), later returning for the seventh in 2026. He has also worked with such directors as James Mangold, Guillermo del Toro, Tommy Lee Jones, Alex Proyas, Ole Bornedal, Kathryn Bigelow, Bong Joon Ho, Dan Gilroy, and John Krasinski.

Beltrami has been nominated for two Academy Awards for 3:10 to Yuma (2007) and The Hurt Locker (2008), and a Golden Globe Award for A Quiet Place (2018). He won a Satellite Award for Soul Surfer (2011) and an Emmy Award for Free Solo (2018).

== Early life ==
Beltrami was born on Setauket, New York, of Italian and Greek descent. He attended Ward Melville High School, and afterwards, graduated from Brown University and studied at the Yale School of Music, and then moved west to the USC Thornton School of Music in Los Angeles, where he studied under composer Jerry Goldsmith.

== Career ==
A few classical commissions and USC student films aside, Beltrami scored his first feature in 1994, the thriller Death Match for director Joe Coppolletta, and reached a higher level of public acclaim in 1996 when he wrote the score for Wes Craven's smash hit shocker Scream. Since then, Beltrami has become firmly entrenched as a composer of choice for the horror/thriller and action genre, with the Scream sequels and hit films such as Mimic (1997), The Faculty (1998), Angel Eyes (2001), Joy Ride (2001), Resident Evil (2002), which he co-composed with Marilyn Manson, Blade II (2002), Hellboy (2004), I, Robot (2004), and Red Eye (2005) featuring prominently in his resume. Apart from horror/thriller and action, he also scores certain independent films such as The Dangerous Lives of Altar Boys and Tommy Lee Jones' The Three Burials of Melquiades Estrada. He was nominated for an Emmy Award for his score for the film David and Lisa in 1998, indicating a desire to spread his musical wings beyond the bounds of his genre pigeonholing.

He has composed the recent entries in the Die Hard franchise, Live Free or Die Hard and A Good Day to Die Hard, taking over from Michael Kamen from whom Beltrami used some of the original themes from the previous three films due to Kamen's death in 2003. Beltrami earned an Academy Award nomination for his work on James Mangold's acclaimed 2007 western remake, 3:10 to Yuma. Despite having met a mixed critical response, he was also nominated, alongside Buck Sanders, for the 2010 Academy Award for Best Original Score for his score to The Hurt Locker. In 2011, he was met with critical praise and won a Satellite Award for Best Original Score for his score to the drama film Soul Surfer. Beltrami composed the soundtrack for Pierce Brosnan's 2014 spy film November Man. He co-composed the score for the 2015 Fantastic Four film with Philip Glass.

Beltrami's signature style is based around highly percussive texture. He often employs both traditional percussive instruments such as bass drums, as well as violins and brass instruments, forming layers of hits and stabs.

== Collaborations ==
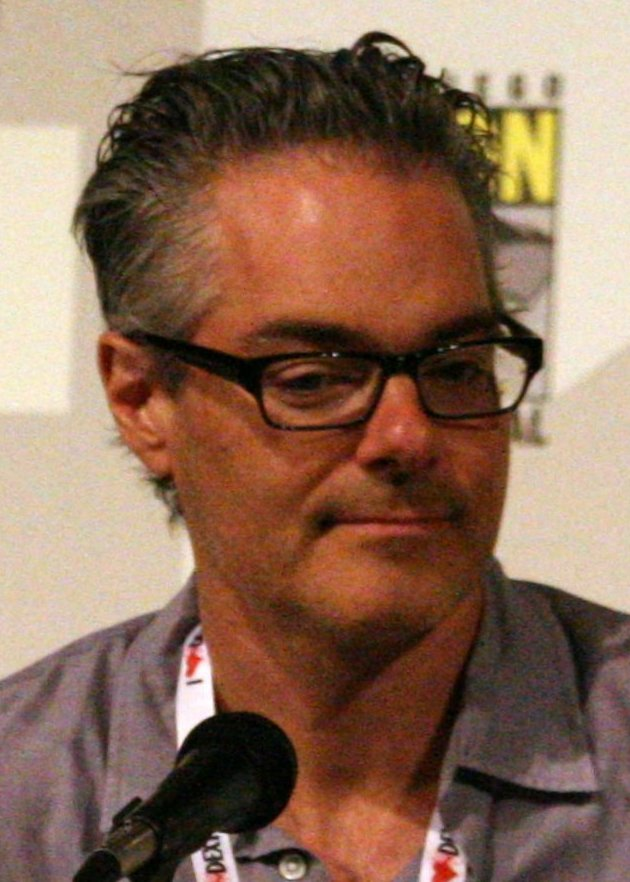
Beltrami in 2013

Beltrami has worked repeatedly with such directors as Wes Craven, James Mangold, Guillermo del Toro, Tommy Lee Jones, Alex Proyas, Len Wiseman, John Moore, Jean-François Richet, Jonathan Levine, and John Krasinski. He has also worked with other musicians, including Marilyn Manson (for Resident Evil).

It was reported in October 2002 on Beltrami's official website that he had worked on orchestral arrangements for "Thyme", "The General", and "Elvis Presley and the Monster of Soul" (also known as "Leave Me Alone") from the then-unreleased Guns N' Roses album Chinese Democracy. While none of those tracks appear on the final track listing of the album, they were confirmed as being recorded during the sessions with a chance of release in the future. However, he was credited officially for providing arrangements on "Street of Dreams", "Madagascar", "There Was a Time", "This I Love", and "Prostitute". "Chinese Democracy" is also the name of a track on Beltrami's score for 3:10 to Yuma. In 2023 he was credited on the final single release of "The General".

== Filmography ==
=== Film ===
| Year | Title | Director | Notes |
|---|---|---|---|
| 1994 | Death Match | Joe Coppoletta | |
| 1995 | The Bicyclist | Robert Stark Hickey | Short film |
| 1995 | The Whispering | Gregory Gieras | |
| 1996 | Scream | Wes Craven | 1st of 7 collaborations with Craven |
| 1997 | Mimic | Guillermo del Toro | 1st of 3 collaborations with del Toro |
| 1997 | Nightwatch | Ole Bornedal | 1st of 4 collaborations with Bornedal; Additional scoring; main score by Joachim Holbek |
| 1997 | Scream 2 | Wes Craven | |
| 1998 | Halloween H20: 20 Years Later | Steve Miner | Composed with John Ottman; Halloween themes by John Carpenter |
| 1998 | 54 | Mark Christopher | |
| 1998 | The Faculty | Robert Rodriguez | |
| 1999 | The Minus Man | Hampton Fancher | |
| 1999 | The Crow: Salvation | Bharat Nalluri | |
| 1999 | The Florentine | Nick Stagliano | |
| 2000 | Scream 3 | Wes Craven | |
| 2000 | The Incorporated | Kenneth Guertin | |
| 2000 | Dracula 2000 | Patrick Lussier | |
| 2000 | The Watcher | Joe Charbanic | |
| 2000 | Highway 395 | Fred Dryer | |
| 2001 | Angel Eyes | Luis Mandoki | Composed with Michael Sherwood |
| 2001 | Joy Ride | John Dahl | |
| 2001 | Texas Rangers | Steve Miner | Unused score; replaced by Trevor Rabin |
| 2002 | The Dangerous Lives of Altar Boys | Peter Care | |
| 2002 | Resident Evil | Paul W. S. Anderson | Composed with Marilyn Manson |
| 2002 | I Am Dina | Ole Bornedal | |
| 2002 | Blade II | Guillermo del Toro | |
| 2003 | Terminator 3: Rise of the Machines | Jonathan Mostow | Terminator themes by Brad Fiedel |
| 2004 | I, Robot | Alex Proyas | 1st of 3 collaborations with Proyas |
| 2004 | Hellboy | Guillermo del Toro | |
| 2004 | Flight of the Phoenix | John Moore | 1st of 4 collaborations with Moore |
| 2004 | Alien vs. Predator | Paul W. S. Anderson | Unused score; replaced by Harald Kloser |
| 2005 | Cursed | Wes Craven | |
| 2005 | XXX: State of the Union | Lee Tamahori | |
| 2005 | The Three Burials of Melquiades Estrada | Tommy Lee Jones | |
| 2005 | Red Eye | Wes Craven | |
| 2006 | Underworld: Evolution | Len Wiseman | Underworld themes by Paul Haslinger; 1st of 3 collaborations with Wiseman |
| 2006 | The Omen | John Moore | Omen themes by Jerry Goldsmith |
| 2007 | The Substitute | Ole Bornedal | |
| 2007 | TMNT | Kevin Munroe | Unused score; replaced by Klaus Badelt |
| 2007 | Captivity | Roland Joffé | |
| 2007 | The Invisible | David S. Goyer | |
| 2007 | 3:10 to Yuma | James Mangold | 1st of 4 collaborations with Mangold |
| 2007 | Live Free or Die Hard | Len Wiseman | Die Hard themes by Michael Kamen |
| 2007 | The Ballad of Esequiel Hernandez | Kieran Fitzgerald | Composed with Bobby Flores |
| 2008 | The Eye | David Moreau; Xavier Palud | |
| 2008 | Max Payne | John Moore | Composed with Buck Sanders |
| 2008 | Amusement | John Simpson | |
| 2008 | Mesrine | Jean-François Richet | Composed with Marcus Trumpp; 1st of 3 collaborations with Richet |
| 2009 | In the Electric Mist | Bertrand Tavernier | |
| 2009 | The Hurt Locker | Kathryn Bigelow | Composed with Buck Sanders |
| 2009 | Knowing | Alex Proyas | |
| 2010 | Repo Men | Miguel Sapochnik | |
| 2010 | Jonah Hex | Jimmy Hayward | Composed with Mastodon |
| 2010 | Don't Be Afraid of the Dark | Troy Nixey | Composed with Buck Sanders |
| 2010 | My Soul to Take | Wes Craven | |
| 2011 | Soul Surfer | Sean McNamara | |
| 2011 | The Thing | Matthijs van Heijningen Jr. | The Thing themes by Ennio Morricone; Composed with Brandon Roberts |
| 2011 | Scream 4 | Wes Craven | |
| 2012 | Trouble with the Curve | Robert Lorenz | |
| 2012 | The Woman in Black | James Watkins | |
| 2012 | The Sessions | Ben Lewin | |
| 2013 | Warm Bodies | Jonathan Levine | Composed with Buck Sanders; 1st of 3 collaborations with Levine |
| 2013 | A Good Day to Die Hard | John Moore | Die Hard themes by Michael Kamen |
| 2013 | Snowpiercer | Bong Joon Ho | 1st of 2 collaborations with Bong |
| 2013 | The Wolverine | James Mangold | Composed with Brandon Roberts |
| 2013 | World War Z | Marc Forster | Composed with Muse |
| 2013 | Carrie | Kimberly Peirce | |
| 2014 | The Homesman | Tommy Lee Jones | |
| 2014 | The Giver | Phillip Noyce | |
| 2014 | The November Man | Roger Donaldson | |
| 2014 | The Drop | Michaël R. Roskam | |
| 2014 | Seventh Son | Sergei Bodrov | |
| 2014 | The Woman in Black: Angel of Death | Tom Harper | Composed with Brandon Roberts & Marcus Trumpp |
| 2015 | The Gunman | Pierre Morel | |
| 2015 | Hitman: Agent 47 | Aleksander Bach | |
| 2015 | Fantastic Four | Josh Trank | Composed with Philip Glass |
| 2015 | True Story | Rupert Goold | |
| 2015 | No Escape | John Erick Dowdle | Composed with Buck Sanders |
| 2015 | The Night Before | Jonathan Levine | Composed with Miles Hankins |
| 2016 | Gods of Egypt | Alex Proyas | |
| 2016 | The Shallows | Jaume Collet-Serra | |
| 2016 | Ben-Hur | Timur Bekmambetov | |
| 2017 | First They Killed My Father | Angelina Jolie | |
| 2017 | Matilda | Alexei Uchitel | |
| 2017 | Logan | James Mangold | Composed with Brandon Roberts |
| 2017 | Little Evil | Eli Craig | Composed with Brandon Roberts & Marcus Trumpp |
| 2017 | The Snowman | Tomas Alfredson | |
| 2018 | A Quiet Place | John Krasinski | 1st of 2 collaborations with Krasinski |
| 2018 | Free Solo | Elizabeth Chai Vasarhelyi; Jimmy Chin | Composed with Brandon Roberts |
| 2018 | The Emperor of Paris | Jean-François Richet | Composed with Marcus Trumpp |
| 2019 | Extremely Wicked, Shockingly Evil and Vile | Joe Berlinger | Composed with Dennis Smith |
| 2019 | Velvet Buzzsaw | Dan Gilroy | Composed with Buck Sanders |
| 2019 | Long Shot | Jonathan Levine | Composed with Miles Hankins |
| 2019 | Ford v Ferrari | James Mangold | Composed with Buck Sanders |
| 2019 | Gemini Man | Ang Lee | Unused score; replaced by Lorne Balfe |
| 2019 | Scary Stories to Tell in the Dark | André Øvredal | Composed with Anna Drubich |
| 2020 | Underwater | William Eubank | Composed with Brandon Roberts |
| 2020 | A Quiet Place Part II | John Krasinski | |
| 2020 | Love and Monsters | Michael Matthews | Composed with Marcus Trumpp |
| 2020 | The Way I See It | Dawn Porter | Composed with Buck Sanders & Brandon Roberts |
| 2021 | Chaos Walking | Doug Liman | Composed with Brandon Roberts |
| 2021 | Fear Street Part One: 1994 | Leigh Janiak | Composed with Marcus Trumpp |
| 2021 | Fear Street Part Two: 1978 | Leigh Janiak | Composed with Brandon Roberts |
| 2021 | Fear Street Part Three: 1666 | Leigh Janiak | Composed with Anna Drubich & Marcus Trumpp |
| 2021 | American Night | Alessio Della Valle | |
| 2021 | Venom: Let There Be Carnage | Andy Serkis | |
| 2021 | The Shadow in My Eye | Ole Bornedal | Composed with Buck Sanders & Ceiri Torjussen |
| 2022 | No Exit | Damien Power | Composed with Miles Hankins |
| 2022 | Deep Water | Adrian Lyne | |
| 2023 | Plane | Jean-François Richet | Composed with Marcus Trumpp |
| 2023 | Renfield | Chris McKay | |
| 2023 | The Nun II | Michael Chaves | |
| 2023 | Silent Night | John Woo | |
| 2024 | The Killer | John Woo | |
| 2024 | The Unholy Trinity | Richard Gray | Composed with Tristan Beltrami |
| 2025 | Ballerina | Len Wiseman | Unused score, with Anna Drubich; replaced by Tyler Bates and Joel J. Richard |
| 2025 | Deaf President Now! | Nyle DiMarco Davis Guggenheim | Composed with Buck Sanders |
| 2026 | Scream 7 | Kevin Williamson | |
| 2026 | The Truth and Tragedy of Moriah Wilson | Marina Zenovich | Documentary film |
| 2026 | Unabomber | Janus Metz Pedersen | Post-production |
| 2027 | Ally | Bong Joon Ho | First composition for an animated film |

=== Television ===
| Year | Title | Notes |
|---|---|---|
| 1995 | Land's End | 13 episodes |
| 1996 | Inhumanoid | Television film |
| 1997 | Stranger in My Home | Television film |
| 1997 | Dellaventura | 1 episode |
| 1998 | David and Lisa | Television film |
| 1999 | Dybt vand | Television film |
| 1999 | Tuesdays with Morrie | Television film |
| 2000 | Goodbye Casanova | Television film; composed with Gianluca Piersanti |
| 2002 | Glory Days | 9 episodes |
| 2000–04 | The Practice | 85 episodes |
| 2009–11 | V | 22 episodes |
| 2011 | The Sunset Limited | Television film |
| 2014 | 1864 | Miniseries |
| 2014–17 | Turn: Washington's Spies | 40 episodes |
| 2015–16 | Lucifer | Theme music and 13 episodes |
| 2017–18 | Six | 18 episodes |
| 2019 | The Twilight Zone | 10 episodes |
| 2019 | Bubble Guppies | featuring Bleeding Fingers Music from the episode "Dragons 'N' Roses!" |
| 2021–25 | Nine Perfect Strangers | 8 episodes |
| 2022–23 | Pantheon | 16 episodes |
| 2023 | MotoGP | Title Music |
| 2024 | Apples Never Fall | Miniseries |

=== Video games ===
| Year | Title | Notes |
|---|---|---|
| 2017 | Fortnite | Theme and additional music |

=== Actor ===
| Year | Title | Director | Role | Notes |
|---|---|---|---|---|
| 2011 | Scream: The Inside Story | Daniel Farrands | Himself | Documentary film |
| 2011 | Still Screaming: The Ultimate Scary Movie Retrospective | Ryan Turek | Himself | Documentary film |
| 2022 | Scream | Matt Bettinelli-Olpin; Tyler Gillett | Partygoer | Vocal cameo |

== Awards and nominations ==
| Award | Wins | Nominations |
| Academy Awards | 0 | 2 |
| Golden Globe Awards | 0 | 1 |
| César Award | 0 | 1 |
| Primetime Emmy Awards | 1 | 2 |

=== Academy Awards ===
| Year | Category | Work | Result |
|---|---|---|---|
| 2008 | Best Original Score | 3:10 to Yuma | Nominated |
| 2010 | Best Original Score | The Hurt Locker | Nominated |

=== Golden Globes ===
| Year | Category | Work | Result |
|---|---|---|---|
| 2019 | Best Original Score | A Quiet Place | Nominated |

=== Primetime Emmy Awards ===
| Year | Category | Work | Result |
|---|---|---|---|
| 1999 | Outstanding Music Composition for a Miniseries or a Movie (Dramatic Underscore) | David and Lisa | Nominated |
| 2019 | Outstanding Music Composition for a Documentary Series or Special (Original Dramatic Score) | Free Solo | Won |

AACTA Award for Best Original Music Score

- 2016: Gods of Egypt (nominated)

César Award for Best Original Music

- 2009: Mesrine (nominated)Cinema Eye Honors Award for Outstanding Achievement in Original Music Score
- 2019: Free Solo (nominated)

Fangoria Chainsaw Award for Best Score

- 1998: Mimic (nominated)
- 2002: Joy Ride (nominated)
- 2005: Hellboy (nominated)
- 2013: The Woman in Black (nominated)

Fright Meter Award for Best Score

- 2012: The Woman in Black (nominated)
- 2018: A Quiet Place (nominated)

Grand Bell Award for Best Music

- 2013: Snowpiercer (nominated)

Hollywood Music in Media Award for Best Original Score

- 2018: Free Solo (nominated)
- 2019: Ford v. Ferrari (won)

Satellite Award for Best Original Score

- 2011: Soul Surfer (won)
- 2019: Ford v. Ferrari (nominated)

=== Critics awards ===
Critics' Choice Movie Award for Best Score

- 2008: 3:10 to Yuma (nominated)

Denver Film Critics Society Award for Best Original Score

- 2019: A Quiet Place (nominated)

Film Critics Circle of Australia Award for Best Music

- 2017: Gods of Egypt (nominated)

Hawaii Film Critics Society Award for Best Original Score

- 2019: A Quiet Place (nominated)

Houston Film Critics Society Award for Best Original Score

- 2008: 3:10 to Yuma (nominated)
