= Chuck Versus the Colonel =

- Chuck episode
- Chuck and Sarah kiss at the motel
- Episode no.: Season 2 Episode 21
- Directed by: Peter Lauer
- Written by: Matt Miller
- Production code: 3T7271
- Original air date: April 20, 2009

Guest appearances
- Scott Bakula as Stephen J. Bartowski; Chevy Chase as Ted Roark; Bonita Friedericy as Diane Beckman; Tony Hale as Emmett Milbarge; Arnold Vosloo as Vincent Smith

Episode chronology
← Previous "Chuck Versus the First Kill"	Next → "Chuck Versus the Ring"

"Chuck Versus the Colonel" is the 21st episode of Chuck's second season, and the 34th episode overall. It aired on NBC on April 20, 2009. Chuck and Sarah go on the run in an effort to locate Chuck's father. At the Buy More, Morgan becomes a pariah among his coworkers after Big Mike's demotion.

== Plot summary ==
=== Main plot ===
The episode begins the morning after the previous episode. Chuck and Sarah head to the coordinates of Black Rock that Chuck flashed on, but arrive only to find an abandoned drive-in theater. At Castle, Beckman promotes Casey to Colonel and orders him to bring Chuck and Sarah in dead or alive. Meanwhile, Ted demands Stephen finish the Intersect by the next morning, or else he'll kill his family.

Unable to return home because they are AWOL, Chuck and Sarah stop to spend the night at a motel. Unknown to them, Vincent has tracked their location. Roark asks him to wait until the morning when the Intersect should be finished before dealing with them. After being interrupted by Ellie and Devon while searching Chuck's room for clues as to where he and Sarah might have gone, Casey tracks a call placed by Chuck to the same motel. The next morning, Chuck and Sarah wake up in each other's arms and begin kissing, but are prevented from moving on to sex when Chuck discovers Morgan took his last condom. Chuck leaves to get one and is apprehended by Casey, but Sarah disables him and cuffs him to a radiator in the motel room. As they prepare to leave, several Fulcrum operatives arrive and Chuck persuades Sarah to go back for Casey, who has already freed himself by tearing out the radiator and who confronts Chuck at the car. Sarah is captured by Fulcrum but Chuck rescues her by running them down with the car. Casey takes them back into custody.

Stephen is tracking them and as they pass the drive-in again, he leaves Chuck a message (Tron 12AM) on a billboard, but Casey refuses to turn back and returns them to Castle, where they are placed in lockdown. Casey informs Beckman of the message, and she agrees to look into it. Casey's home alarm is tripped by Devon, and he hurries back to deal with him. Meanwhile, Chuck and Sarah are about to kiss again when a short blackout (see below) disables the security and allows them to escape. They see Devon trapped in Casey's apartment on one of the monitors when power is restored and rush back home as well.

Chuck and Sarah stop Casey from killing Devon and leave Casey tied up, while they return to the drive-in to rescue Stephen. Beckman advises Casey that there's not enough time to rescue Stephen, so she has instead decided to order an air strike to destroy the facility to prevent Fulcrum from gaining the Intersect. Casey escapes and goes after the rest of his team. He joins Sarah in freeing Stephen before the air strike arrives. However, they are captured by Vincent. Chuck is told to stay in the car, but when a large group of Fulcrum agents arrive he realizes that Roark is going to use the completed Intersect to build an army, so he leaves to stop it. He encounters Roark, who brings all the prisoners into the projection booth. Chuck warns Sarah and Casey to close their eyes, but Stephen tells Chuck to leave his open. He does as his father instructs as Stephen had reprogrammed the Intersect to remove the Intersect data, not implant it.

Before Roark's men kill them, Air Force F-16s arrive and begin attack runs on the base. The Fulcrum agents scatter and the team escapes, taking the Intersect with them. Back at Castle, Beckman commends Casey on rescuing Stephen, recovering the Intersect, and destroying Fulcrum's operation, but he deflects her praise and covers for Sarah by saying it was her idea to pretend going rogue to flush out Fulcrum. Beckman clears Sarah of wrongdoing and announces their operation is over and Chuck is free to live out his life. Chuck tries to thank her but she cuts the transmission.

The episode ends with a battered Ted Roark hitching a ride on a semi, headed for Ellie's wedding.

=== Buy More ===
Morgan is on the outs with the rest of his coworkers after Big Mike was removed as store manager by Emmett, who wants to make Morgan his assistant manager. Morgan initially refuses and tries to make things up to Big Mike. Eventually he accepts the promotion from Emmett and tries to use it to control Emmett's power plays by protecting Big Mike and the rest of the employees. However, Emmett continues to force Mike to do menial tasks around the store. After he's ordered to install new registers, Jeff and Lester set off a bomb they found in Casey's locker inside a generator outside the store, which causes a temporary blackout throughout Burbank.

Morgan is ordered to fire them. He tries to avoid doing so by asking the two to apologize, which they refuse to do. Anna confronts Morgan about why he takes their abuse and chides him about not having any dreams outside the Buy More. Morgan confesses that he dreams of being a Benihana chef in Hawaii. Emmett continues to pressure Morgan to fire Jeff and Lester, until finally Morgan decides to do the honorable thing. He asks Big Mike to take care of his mother, then in full view of everyone strips off his assistant manager's vest and green Buy More shirt and quits. He asks Anna to come with him to Hawaii as he follows his dream to train as a chef.

He and Anna leave the store to the applause of all his coworkers.

=== Family ===
Devon interrupts Casey's search of Chuck's room, (see above) but grows suspicious about his behavior and Chuck's disappearance. He heads to the Buy More to ask Jeff and Lester if they've seen Chuck, and about Casey. The two break into Casey's locker and reveal that Casey has keys to Chuck's house and keeps logs of his doings at the store, as well as chloroform and other disturbing equipment. Jeff expresses admiration for Casey as a stalker.

Growing more concerned, Devon uses Casey's keys to break into his apartment, where he sees Casey's surveillance equipment, including the camera in Chuck's room. He tries to gain access to Casey's computer, but trips an alarm which locks him in. Casey, alerted to his intrusion, returns to his apartment. Devon confronts him about his intrusion into Chuck's privacy and defends himself when Casey tries to kill him. Casey gets back to his feet but before he can finish Devon off is ambushed by Sarah and Chuck. Devon insists on calling the police, but now that Devon has seen so much, Chuck reluctantly tells him that he is a high-profile government asset, and Sarah and Casey are his handlers. Chuck asks for Devon to "be awesome" and to cover for him with Ellie. Devon is stunned, but he agrees to help.

Later, when Ellie comes home and asks him about Chuck, Devon begins to panic. Ellie mistakes this as wedding jitters and orders him to remain focused. He begins to calm down as they prepare to leave for their rehearsal dinner and assures her that Chuck loves her and was just shaken up by their father leaving again. He asks her to trust Chuck, who finally returns home and apologizes, then brings Stephen in as their wedding present.

As they all head out for the dinner, Chuck stops by Casey's apartment and asks him to come with them. Casey initially refuses, saying his mission is over, but Chuck tells him he's asking as a friend. Casey closes the door, but as Chuck turns to leave he comes back out with several cigars in-hand. Sarah then arrives as well and Casey leaves them to talk. Chuck is unable to believe that it is real, but Sarah assures him it is, as she takes him by the hand.

== Production ==
"Chuck Versus the Colonel" addresses several major and minor subplots that have progressed throughout the second season. The season's main arc concerning the Fulcrum Intersect was resolved with the team successfully rescuing Stephen Bartowski and capturing the new Intersect computer. Chris Fedak and Josh Schwartz had previously indicated the episode would be a turning point in Chuck and Sarah's relationship, furthered by dialog throughout the episode following them nearly having sex in the first part of the episode. Devon also discovered the truth of Chuck's secret life, first hinted at by comments made by Ryan McPartlin.

The most significant development was the removal of the Intersect from Chuck's head, which dates to the beginning of the first season.

=== Production details ===
- Several references are made to previous episodes. Casey shooting Chuck's picture in his "rogues gallery" is in reference to "Chuck Versus the First Date" (in which he missed), and Chuck telling Devon not to freak out before revealing his role in government work is a reference to the pilot.
- This is the first appearance of the Herder since it was destroyed in "Chuck Versus the Best Friend." The episode did not establish if this car shared the same government modifications, or if it was one of the store's other vehicles.
- Stephen Bartowski says "Aces, Charles," when Chuck tracks him to the drive-in, referencing the quote from "Chuck Versus the Intersect."
- Tron once again appears as a recurring theme, when Stephen uses this as a code to attract Chuck's attention.

=== Flashes ===
- Chuck flashes on the license plate of the car driven by Vincent.

== Reception ==
"Chuck Versus the Colonel" has met with overwhelmingly positive reviews. Eric Goldman of IGN scored the episode a 9.5 out of 10, a series high alongside "Chuck Versus Santa Claus", Season 3's "Chuck Versus the Beard" and "Chuck Versus the Subway", Season 4's "Chuck Versus the Cliffhanger", and Season 5's "Chuck Versus the Kept Man" and "Chuck Versus the Goodbye". Goldman cited as the episode's only flaw the ease with which Casey went back on his refusal to help Chuck and Sarah and then cover for Sarah's desertion at the end of the episode. TV Squad praised the balance of the episode's action, humor, pop culture references and romantic subplots, and particularly cited the use of the drive-in theater as a secret base. Alan Sepinwall cited the episode as all the reasons he enjoys watching Chuck.

== References to popular culture ==
- Following on from the end of "Chuck Versus the First Kill," the Buy More plot makes several references to The Godfather, particularly the scene between Big Mike and Morgan in the home theater room.
- This episode carries on in the tradition of previous Chuck episodes in referencing Spies Like Us, which features a secret military base located underneath a drive-in theater.
- Morgan carrying Anna out of the Buy More to the applause of his coworkers is a reference to the film, An Officer and a Gentleman.
- The playground horse that is used as an entrance to Fulcrum's secret base is a reference to the opening scene and Sarah Connor's dream in Terminator 2: Judgment Day.
- Chuck telling Casey and Sarah to close their eyes when Roark starts the Intersect refers to the scene in Raiders of the Lost Ark when Indiana Jones tells Marion to do the same when the Nazis open the Ark.
- Roark greeting the Fulcrum agents before activating the Intersect is played in the style of Steve Jobs' presentations, previously referenced in "Chuck Versus the Dream Job."
- Roark standing atop the movie screen asking the Fulcrum agents "Can you dig it?" refers to Cyrus in the 1979 movie The Warriors.
- In his review of the episode, Alan Sepinwall compares the frequent abuse inflicted on Vincent to South Park's Kenny McCormick.
- The drive-in is called Starbright which is a reference to Quantum Leap and the Starbright project.
