= Chuck Versus the Suitcase =

- Chuck episode
- Episode no.: Season 4 Episode 2
- Directed by: Gail Mancuso
- Written by: Rafe Judkins; Lauren LeFranc
- Original air date: September 27, 2010

Guest appearances
- Lou Ferrigno as a Volkoff bodyguard; Karolína Kurková as Sofia Stepanova; Harry Dean Stanton as "the repo man; Dolph Lundgren as an enemy operative

Episode chronology
← Previous "Chuck Versus the Anniversary"	Next → "Chuck Versus the Cubic Z"

"Chuck Versus the Suitcase" is the second episode of the fourth season of Chuck. It originally aired September 27, 2010. There are crimes of fashion when Chuck Bartowski and Sarah Walker go undercover in Milan for Fashion Week to seize a high-tech weapon, yet Chuck soon recognizes a flaw in his relationship with Sarah. Meanwhile, Morgan Grimes discovers a vulnerability about the new Buy More.

== Plot ==
=== Main plot ===
In Milan, a US intelligence operative chases a Volkoff operative named Sofia Stepanova (Karolína Kurková), who stole an ammunition clip containing smart bullets from a weapons development facility outside Paris. She kills him with one of the smart bullets. In a Team Bartowski briefing, General Beckman reveals that Sofia is the executor of Volkoff's most important weapons dealer, using her cover as a runway model. Beckman sends Chuck and Sarah to Milan Fashion Week to intercept the bullets.

Sarah sees Sofia and guesses that the bullets are in Sofia's purse. Chuck Bartowski moves to retrieve it, but he is unsuccessful, and Sofia gives her purse to a bartender. When they catch him, the purse instead contains a ticking time bomb. Chuck grabs the bomb, triggering a dead man's switch, but Sarah manages to defuse it with one second to spare.

Later, they break into the Presidential Suite where Sofia is staying. As they start to open her safe, Sofia enters the room and takes a shower. While Chuck flashes to open the safe, Sarah encounters Sofia's long-time bodyguard (Lou Ferrigno). Just as Chuck removes the smart bullets from the safe, a naked Sofia holds him at gunpoint. Sarah incapacitates the bodyguard and she and Chuck escape with the bullets. When they return to Castle, they are informed by General Beckman that Sofia was one step ahead of them, and the microchips have been removed from the bullets.

Chuck and Sarah return to Milan after they realize Sofia hides the microchips in a sequined dress. They pass Sofia's sentries with tranquilizer gloves and Sarah changes into the dress. Chuck is challenged by her bodyguards, whom he defeats with a flash on staff fighting and his tranquilizer gloves. Meanwhile, Sofia sees Sarah and they get into a fight, which drags out onto the catwalk. Sarah defeats Sofia, and the microchips are recaptured.

=== Buy More ===
Morgan Grimes begins to notice a serious flaw in the new Buy More. The government personnel are so well trained that their excessive efficiency, pleasant demeanor and helpful service, all of which is completely opposite to the public perception of how a Buy More should be run, renders the store's cover virtually transparent. Morgan demonstrates this to General Beckman by intentionally spilling a drink, which is immediately cleaned up, then repeatedly and casually dropping merchandise, only to have it swiftly and acrobatically returned to the shelves.

With Beckman's approval, Morgan and Casey begin "recruiting" the store's former staff, starting with Jeff and Lester, who have been hiding out "in the wild" (actually an urban area seven minutes drive from Burbank, with traffic) since their alleged destruction of the Buy More in "Chuck Versus the Ring: Part II." When the duo realize that Morgan actually wants them to return, they begin to make demands, but Casey simply tranquilizes them.

When Devon shops there, looking for baby supplies, the efficiency of the place immediately makes him speculate that Chuck has not, in fact, retired from the spy world, leading him to ask questions. They point out to him that while Chuck is retired, Casey and Sarah are still spies and thus the Buy More is still their cover. When Ellie goes to the Buy More to return some of the baby goods Devon has bought, Morgan has augmented the government personnel with the store's former lazy, creepy, and surly staff, making the place feel more like its old inefficient self. In recognition of this, Beckman promotes him to store manager.

=== Family ===
Devon stresses over Ellie, who is 13 weeks pregnant and has not been sleeping well recently. He buys an excessive amount of baby merchandise and tries to keep her resting, reasoning that since she essentially raised Chuck alone without her mother, she shouldn't have to raise this child alone as well. Ellie reassures him that her mother's absence means nothing to her, and promises to let Devon help so long as he allows her to carry part of the load. She later nostalgically looks through old photos of her father (Scott Bakula) and mother (Linda Hamilton), belying her earlier protest that her mother's disappearance was of no importance to her.

Meanwhile, Chuck and Sarah's relationship faces a new obstacle: Sarah's unwillingness to "plant roots", demonstrated by the titular suitcase that she refuses to unpack. Sarah states that it's a spy thing, which Chuck disproves by noting that Sofia felt comfortable enough to unpack her wardrobe in the hotel's closet. When Sarah reluctantly begins to do so after their first mission to Milan, Chuck makes her stop, and tells her to wait until she's ready. At the end of the episode, she willingly unpacks the suitcase except for a photo of her and Chuck (something she keeps in her suitcase, no matter where she is), admitting to Chuck that he is her home, he always has been. As they lie down to go to sleep, Chuck comments that maybe they're "next" to get married and have children, leaving Sarah horrified.

== Production ==
Guest appearances by Harry Dean Stanton and Dolph Lundgren

=== Production details ===
- A harbor shown as part of Milan after Chuck arrives is actually one of the most famous piers of Hamburg, Germany.

=== Continuity ===
- Ellie has been pregnant 13 weeks.
- Jeff and Lester have been on the run for 184 days since "Chuck Versus the Ring: Part II."

=== Flashes ===
- Chuck flashes on mathematics to open Sofia's safe with probable combinations.
- Chuck flashes on staff fighting skills to defeat Sofia's bodyguards.

== Cultural references ==
- Lester comically tries to pulls a Jedi mind trick on Morgan (and Morgan starts to play along). The line "These are not the boys you're looking for" references Star Wars Episode IV: A New Hope.
- Chuck is interviewed at Vandalay Industries, a fictitious company invented by George in Seinfeld.
- Morgan gives Chuck a speech about his Achilles' heel and mentions several conflicted relationships: "Romeo and Juliet, Tristan and Isolde, Anakin and Padmé."
- Chuck is rejected in an attempt to replicate Peter and Mary Jane's kiss in Spider-Man.
- When Chuck and Sarah return to Milan they are disguised as Maxwell Smart and Agent 99 from Get Smart.

== Critical response ==
The episode was viewed by 5.373 million people, and received a 2.0/5 on the Nielson scale.

The episode received generally favorable reviews from critics. Alan Sepinwall of HitFix, regarding the episode in the context of the current season, wrote, "so far, it feels like this is going to be a really strong run to the finish line." Ethan Anderton of collider.com wrote "Chuck's second installment of its fourth season comes up with a great way to get the Buy More back to its secondhand standards and keep Chuck and Sarah's relationship interesting despite the fact that they are officially together." Steve Heisler of The A.V. Club, on a scale from A+ to F, gave the episode a B rating. Heisler wrote, "Chuck is still a spy show trafficking in affable accessibility; it just needs to tinker with its underlying emotional track." Eric Goldman of IGN gave the episode an 8.5 out of 10 rating, remarking that the episode was "very enjoyable".
