= Chuck Versus the First Kill =

- Chuck episode
- Chuck does The Morgan
- Episode no.: Season 2 Episode 20
- Directed by: Norman Buckley
- Written by: Scott Rosenbaum
- Production code: 3T7270
- Original air date: April 13, 2009

Guest appearances
- Jordana Brewster as Jill Roberts; Christopher Cousins as Bill Bergey; Ken Davitian as Bernie Ominsky; Bonita Friedericy as Diane Beckman; Tony Hale as Emmett Milbarge; David Burke as Mr. Mercer; Peter Onorati as Wally Roberts; Lori Alan as Judy Roberts

Episode chronology
← Previous "Chuck Versus the Dream Job"	Next → "Chuck Versus the Colonel"

"Chuck Versus the First Kill" aired on NBC on April 13, 2009, the 20th episode of the second season, and 33rd overall. Chuck strikes a deal with his ex-girlfriend Jill (Jordana Brewster) to have her released from prison if she cooperates with his search for his father. Meanwhile, Morgan attempts to sabotage Emmett's efficiency review.

== Plot summary ==
Chuck angrily confronts Beckman about their failure to locate his father, Stephen. Chuck decides that he must take matters into his own hands and interrogate a Fulcrum agent. Jill recommends that the team question her father's best friend, Uncle Bernie, while warning them that most of the time the only way to gain access to him without his bodyguards is at family gatherings. Chuck decides to manufacture one by going undercover with Jill and throwing a party to celebrate their engagement.

While Chuck and Jill meet with Jill's family, Casey and Sarah monitor from the van outside. Bernie suffers a fatal heart attack and collapses. After his death, Casey and Chuck carry him from the party, pretending that he is still alive by moving him and speaking for him.

At Castle, Chuck intercepts a call from Fulcrum to Bernie's. Sarah tracks the call to a business used as a recruiting front by Fulcrum. Jill walks Chuck and Casey through infiltrating the facility, where they take a test to determine their eligibility for recruitment. Chuck is taken in for interrogation, while Casey escapes, having gotten a very low score.

Jill and Sarah enter the building to rescue them, but Sarah is identified and pinned down in a heavy firefight. Jill tries to escape during the gunfight, where she overhears that Stephen is being taken to a facility called "Black Rock." Chuck identifies it as a location outside Barstow.

== Production ==
On March 14, 2009 Jordana Brewster reported she would be returning to reprise her role of Jill Roberts. Later updates would establish the plot of the episode, with Chuck making a deal with Jill for her assistance in rescuing his father. Ken Davitian was also announced as guest-starring as "Uncle Bernie," the Fulcrum operative that recruited Jill.

Additionally, Chris Fedak and Josh Schwartz had said that by the end of the season, Chuck would be recording his first "kill."
