= Chuck Versus the Suburbs =

- Chuck episode
- Brad and Sylvia prepare to test the Intersect prototype on Chuck.
- Episode no.: Season 2 Episode 13
- Directed by: Jay Chandrasekhar
- Written by: Phil Klemmer
- Production code: 3T7264
- Original air date: February 16, 2009

Guest appearances
- Bonita Friedericy as Diane Beckman; Tony Hale as Emmett Milbarge; Darren Keefe as Yeager; Jenny McCarthy as Sylvia Arculin; Patricia Rae as Bolonia Garcia Boganvia Grimes; Andy Richter as Brad White; Alison Simpson as Vanessa White; Brian Thompson as Cliff Arculin / Cliff Siljak

Episode chronology
← Previous "Chuck Versus the Third Dimension"	Next → "Chuck Versus the Best Friend"

"Chuck Versus the Suburbs" is the thirteenth episode of the second season of Chuck. It originally aired on NBC on February 16, 2009. General Beckman (Bonita Friedericy) sends Chuck Bartowski, Sarah Walker, and John Casey to a Los Angeles suburb on an undercover mission, with Chuck and Sarah posing as a married couple. After accidentally obtaining a part of Fulcrum's Intersect data, Chuck discovers that the suburban development is a front for Fulcrum. The team is captured by some of their neighbors, including Brad (Andy Richter) and Sylvia (Jenny McCarthy), who test Chuck by uploading their prototype to Chuck's brain. Meanwhile, Big Mike is introduced to internet dating by Morgan Grimes, Lester Patel, and Jeff Barnes at the Buy More, which backfires on Morgan.

== Plot ==
=== Main plot ===
General Beckman (Bonita Friedericy) and John Casey provide Chuck Bartowski and Sarah Walker with their next mission: to infiltrate the suburbs of Los Angeles to locate a sleeper cell that left a former agent, Yeager (Darren Keefe), debilitated. For the mission, Chuck and Sarah will pose as a married couple living in the Meadow's Branch suburban cul-de-sac.

Chuck drives to his new driveway and enters his home to find CIA-manufactured photographs of his life, including his and Sarah's wedding pictures and vacation pictures. He even has a dog. Chuck finds Sarah in the kitchen, making potato salad, having invited the neighbors for a barbecue, during which Sylvia Arculin (Jenny McCarthy) develops an attraction to Chuck. Afterward, Casey finds a bug in the appetizers brought by one of the neighbors. Casey identifies it as belonging to the government, but Chuck flashes and learns that it was stolen by Fulcrum from a CIA substation in Omaha, Nebraska in 2006.

Chuck wakes up the next morning to find that Sarah has cooked him breakfast and prepared his travel coffee, even giving him a grocery list, demonstrating her enjoyment of the mission. Meanwhile, Casey discovers that Sylvia's husband, Cliff Arculin (Brian Thompson) has purchased specialty cabling to break into secure government websites. Cliff is identified as Cliff Siljak, a former CIA agent. Chuck is assigned to approach Cliff by pretending to begin an affair with Sylvia.

Sylvia brings Chuck upstairs into her bedroom, removes his pants, and handcuffs him to the bed. Chuck delays by asking her for Scotch whisky. Chuck manages to unlock the cuffs and find Cliff's cabling, which is attached to a computer. The computer requests a password, which Chuck deduces is "salamander." After he enters the password, Chuck unknowingly uploads a fraction of a prototype of the Fulcrum Intersect, incapacitating him.

Cliff rushes home and confronts Sylvia about Chuck. As they head upstairs, Chuck recovers and escapes through a window and off the roof, exposing himself to the neighborhood as he runs home. To keep their cover intact, Sarah feigns anger at his apparent unfaithfulness and slaps him across the face. General Beckman is angered that Chuck was exposed and endangered, removing him from the mission so that Sarah and Casey can focus on the Arculins.

As Chuck fails to understand the data he has uploaded, he flashes on a flier for the neighborhood, revealing the entire cul-de-sac to be a front for Fulcrum. He calls Sarah, only to get no answer. As Casey poses as the cable guy, Brad White (Andy Richter), a cheerful stationery salesman, tasers Casey. Sylvia and another female neighbor take Sarah into their custody. Chuck arrives at the house, frantic and yelling for Sarah. Brad smiles and tasers him as well.

Chuck is strapped to a chair, while Sarah is in another room. The Fulcrum agents try to recruit Chuck, planning to see if he can survive their experiments. They are rebuilding the Intersect to gain all the CIA's secrets (it is their belief that the government has reverted to pre-existing methods to combat terrorism), but all the other agents have died when they attempted to upload the Intersect to their brains. Chuck pleads with them to release Sarah, and the agents, realizing that he is in love with her, mocks his delusion that they could be together.

Chuck is uploaded with Fulcrum's entire prototype, apparently brainwashing him, thus leaving the Fulcrum agents convinced that their experiments were successful. They then move to experiment on Sarah. Meanwhile, Casey has escaped his bonds and entered the control room. Chuck asks to speak with Sarah, telling her to close her eyes. As all the agents are in the experiment room and unprotected from the pictorial test, Casey activates the prototype, incapacitating them. (See "Continuity")

At the Orange Orange, Chuck returns his wedding ring to Sarah.

Casey and Sarah supervise the packing up the contents at the home in the cul-de-sac.

=== Buy More ===
At the Buy More, everyone has high spirits for Valentine's Day, except Big Mike, who is taking his anger out on everyone because his wife has filed for divorce. Morgan Grimes, Lester Patel, and Jeff Barnes introduce him to internet dating, where he sees attractive women and decides to try it. Mike concocts several lies to get the good dates, fabricating the story that he is a wealthy shipping tycoon.

Big Mike later decides to tell his internet date the truth about himself. The woman, Bolonia (Patricia Rae) arrives at the Buy More, having lied herself, and thinking that the meeting was arranged at the Buy More because her 26-year-old son works there. Mike scans the store's employees, wishing aloud that her son is Chuck. Suddenly, Morgan approaches, revealing that Bolonia is his mother, horrified that she has begun a relationship with his boss.

== Production ==
"Chuck Versus the Suburbs" was produced after "Chuck Versus the Best Friend," but the airing order was swapped in the United States due to the latter being preempted for a presidential speech. As "Chuck Versus the Suburbs" has a Valentine's Day theme, it was aired on its intended date in the week of Valentine's Day. The house used for filming the interior and exterior scenes of this episode can be found at 25611 Walker Place, Stevenson Ranch, California.

=== Continuity ===
Though the episode itself does not conclusively reveal the fates of the Fulcrum agents, subsequent episodes and online exclusives provided additional information. The activation of the prototype killed Brad, as his brain could not handle the vast amount of data, while Cliff survived the activation and was incarcerated. The fates of Vanessa and Sylvia are unknown. Brad, Vanessa, Cliff, and Sylvia all appeared on the chart hidden behind Chuck's Tron poster in "Chuck Versus the Lethal Weapon".

=== Flashes ===
- Chuck flashes on a bug, learning that it was stolen by Fulcrum from a CIA substation in Omaha in 2006.
- Chuck flashes on a brochure for the neighborhood, revealing the entire cul-de-sac to be a front for Fulcrum.
- Chuck flashes on the residents of the neighborhood.

== Cultural references ==
- References are made to The Terminator at the beginning of the episode when Morgan, Lester and Jeff observe Big Mike at work on Valentine's Day.
- Jeff suggests that Big Mike is a cyborg and calls him a "skin job," a term used in both Blade Runner and Battlestar Galactica.
- Chuck wears a T-shirt that says "Cowbell Hero," parodying both Guitar Hero and the cowbell sketch from Saturday Night Live.
- Chuck asks if Sarah is enjoying the "whole Martha Stewart thing."
- Chuck is forcibly strapped to a chair and forced to watch encoded images, alluding to the Ludovico technique from A Clockwork Orange.
- Chuck clutches Sarah and tells her to close her eyes as the Fulcrum Intersect is set loose, like the opening of the Ark of the Covenant at the end of Raiders of the Lost Ark.
- Mike's dating alias is "Lando Calrissian," referencing the Star Wars character.

== Critical response ==
"Chuck Versus the Suburbs" received positive reviews from critics. Steve Heisler of The A.V. Club gave the episode an A−, writing that the episode "was a treat for those who've been sticking with the show for so long. A lot happened over in the suburbs with Chuck, Sarah, Casey and [Andy Richter], but first, a word about the Buy More: those precious Buy More segments that often disappoint. They're usually too distracting from the main story line -- and not funny enough to justify it -- and always have zero bearing on future episodes. But tonight's worked right up until the end and set the stage for a lot of wonderful tension." Heisler called the reveal that Meadow's Branch was populated with Fulcrum agents "one of the better reveals in Chuck's history."

Eric Goldman of IGN gave the episode an 8 out of 10, writing, "While not an original concept for a spy scenario, Chuck and Sarah posing as a married couple was an interesting dynamic for the two... Overall, this was a decent episode: it wasn't as funny as some, but it ended up being a bit more important in the overall storyline than first expected."

The episode drew 6.836 million viewers.
