= Chuck Versus the Ring =

- Chuck episode
- Chuck takes down Miles after learning kung fu from The Intersect 2.0.
- Episode no.: Season 2 Episode 22
- Directed by: Robert Duncan McNeill
- Written by: Chris Fedak; Allison Adler
- Production code: 3T7272
- Original air date: April 27, 2009

Guest appearances
- Scott Bakula as Stephen J. Bartowski; Matthew Bomer as Bryce Larkin; Bruce Boxleitner as Woody Woodcomb; Chevy Chase as Ted Roark; Tug Coker as Miles; Morgan Fairchild as Honey Woodcomb; Bonita Friedericy as Diane Beckman; Tony Hale as Emmett Milbarge; Patricia Rae as Bolonia Grimes

Episode chronology
← Previous "Chuck Versus the Colonel"	Next → "Chuck Versus the Pink Slip"

"Chuck Versus the Ring" is the second season finale of Chuck, which aired on NBC on April 27, 2009. The day of Ellie and Devon's wedding arrives, but Chuck finds himself forced to protect both his sister and the event from a vengeful Ted Roark.

The title of the episode is a double entendre, referencing both the wedding rings, and the Ring, introduced in this episode, who are the main antagonists of season 3.

== Plot ==
At the church on the day of the wedding, Chuck discovers two dead caterers stashed under a table. Roark arrives and demands the Intersect, or else he will kill Ellie. Chuck tells Morgan to stall, and heads back to Castle to recover the Intersect cube but Bryce warns him it's already been moved and reveals he has known about Orion, Chuck's father, for some time now. When Chuck tells him Ellie's life is in danger, Bryce decides to offer himself up as bait. As Roark tries to escape, Casey and his team take Roark back to Castle.

Miles, one of Casey's men, murders both Roark and Casey's team but spares Casey because Casey had previously saved his life.

At the building where the Intersect is stored, Chuck uses his father's computer to gain access to the Intersect, where he finds Bryce with a fatal gunshot wound. Bryce warns him the Intersect is too powerful and must be destroyed. Bryce asks Chuck to take care of Sarah before dying. Chuck turns to the Intersect, torn between destroying it or downloading. After flashing back on several previous moments, illustrating why he was sent the Intersect in the first place, Chuck downloads the new system into his head. Chuck then triggers a power surge that destroys the system and also disables the security system protecting the chamber. Miles and his men enter with Sarah and Casey as prisoners and prepare to kill them in front of Chuck. Chuck flashes and instantly learns kung fu, then effortlessly defeats all five hostiles. The episode ends on a cliffhanger.

== Reception ==
Alan Sepinwall of the New Jersey Star-Ledger called the episode the best in the series. He particularly cited the scene of Jeffster!'s performance of "Mr. Roboto" set against the church shootout as containing "so much concentrated awesome that it might be illegal in certain states." IGN scored the episode a 9.3, finding it a bit choppy with multiple endings that caused the episode to seem to stop and start.
