= Chuck Versus the Dream Job =

- Chuck episode
- Stephen J. Bartowski and Ted Roark in "Chuck Versus the Dream Job"
- Episode no.: Season 2 Episode 19
- Directed by: Robert Duncan McNeill
- Written by: Phil Klemmer; Corey Nickerson
- Production code: 3T7269
- Original air date: April 16, 2009

Guest appearances
- Scott Bakula as Stephen J. Bartowski; Chevy Chase as Ted Roark; Bonita Friedericy as Diane Beckman; Tony Hale as Emmett Milbarge; Brian Kubach as Drew; Arnold Vosloo as Vincent Smith

Episode chronology
← Previous "Chuck Versus the Broken Heart"	Next → "Chuck Versus the First Kill"

"Chuck Versus the Dream Job" aired on NBC on April 6, 2009. It is the 19th episode of the Chuck series' second season. The protagonist Chuck, played by Zachary Levi, interviews for a job at Roark Industries with the goal of hiring on to investigate a possible computer virus, while his father, Stephen J. Bartowski (Scott Bakula), returns home.

== Plot summary ==
Chuck and Sarah meet with Chuck's father Stephen and convince him to return home. The reunion with Ellie does not go as planned, but Chuck persuades her to forgive Stephen for leaving. The reunion becomes more awkward when Stephen rants about many things he claims to have invented that were stolen by Ted Roark (Chevy Chase). Among his father's possessions is an advertisement for a major tech show where Roark's latest computer operating system is to be released, which Chuck flashes on.

At Castle, Beckman briefs the team. Chatter has led them to believe a virus is being released in the operating system, and she orders them to investigate. A job interview is arranged for Chuck, under his own identity. He is hired immediately and meets Roark, whom he has dreamed of working for since Stanford. Jeff and Lester see Chuck leaving Roark's headquarters and inform Morgan, who reveals Chuck's new "job" at dinner, upsetting Stephen as he believes Roark destroyed his life.

Casey and Sarah attempt to break in to stop the launch the next day, but are unable to bypass security. Chuck flashes on a Fulcrum agent on stage with Roark, and with no other options, bursts on stage in an effort to warn Roark about the virus, but Roark doesn't believe him. Chuck then tries to prevent the launch but fails. Ellie, watching the launch online with Stephen, is angered because she believes Chuck threw his dream job away for his father, though Stephen denies putting him up to it.

Upset at the Intersect for ruining his life, Chuck goes through the documents left to him by Orion to learn how to free himself of the Intersect. Stephen interrupts to tell him he didn't want Chuck to ruin his own career just for him, and if he wants to work for Roark it's okay with him. As he leaves, Chuck notices that the layout of Roark's offices matches the diagram in Orion's documents. He realizes that Roark is building a full-scale Intersect system for Fulcrum, but Casey and Sarah don't believe him without solid proof. He takes it upon himself to infiltrate the office to investigate, tranquilizing Casey when he tries to stop him.

Chuck breaks into Roark's campus, but is forced to hide when his father barges in, demanding to speak to Roark. When the Fulcrum agent Chuck flashed on attacks Stephen, Chuck bursts from his hiding place and tranquilizes Roark's security, then attempts to escape with Stephen. They run into Vincent (Arnold Vosloo), but Stephen incapacitates him and unlocks the door with a wrist-mounted computer, then reveals to Chuck that he was Orion all along, and that he left Chuck and Ellie for their own protection.

He leads Chuck deep into the heart of Roark's complex, where they find the nearly complete Fulcrum Intersect, which Stephen prepares to use to remove the Intersect from Chuck's brain when they are interrupted by Roark and Vincent. Roark is about to have Chuck killed, but Stephen promises to help Roark if he spares Chuck. Casey and Sarah arrive just as Roark is departing with Stephen, who tells Chuck he was wrong to tell him not to trust his handlers (in "Chuck Versus the Predator"). Back at Castle, Beckman makes clear the consequences of Roark escaping both with the Intersect and Orion, but tells them that she will put the government's best team on it. Chuck convinces Beckman that Operation Bartowski is her best team, and demands to be part of the effort to rescue his father. Beckman relents when Casey sides with Chuck, but he warns him not to allow his personal feelings to get in the way.

Back at home, Ellie is heartbroken thinking that their father has left them again, but Chuck tells her not to give up on him.

== Production ==
"Chuck Versus the Dream Job" continues on the arc begun with "Chuck Versus the Lethal Weapon", particularly referencing Orion and furthering Chuck's quest to have the Intersect removed from his head. It also advances the general arc of season two, which has focused heavily on Fulcrum's desire to obtain the Intersect for its own purposes. Additionally, Arnold Vosloo reprises his role of Vincent from "Chuck Versus the Predator".

Bakula and Chase were announced to be playing the roles of Stephen Bartowski and Ted Roark, respectively, in January, 2009 as part of an extended arc to close out the season. Besides their resemblance to each other, Bakula was cast for Stephen Bartowski because Josh Schwartz and Chris Fedak consider themselves "huge Quantum Leap fans, and found Bakula's ability to jump from comedy to drama to action reminiscent of Zachary Levi's.

=== Flashes ===
- Chuck flashes on the flyer for Roark's OS launch.
- When Roark consults with one of the men on stage at the launch, Chuck flashes and identifies him as a Fulcrum operative
- Chuck intentionally flashes to crack a Feistel cipher in order to unlock the door to Roark's Intersect room. This is the first clue that the Intersect can grant abilities other than recalling intelligence.

== Reception ==
"Chuck Versus the Dream Job" has received overall positive reviews.

IGN.com rated the episode a 9/10, praising the gravity Chase brought to Ted Roark, and the offbeat and semi-crazy angle Bakula uses to approach Stephen Bartowski. Chuck's proactiveness in taking control of his situation was also appreciated, as were the character-building moments between Chuck and Ellie, and that the events of Devon's bachelor party weren't just thrown out. The Futon Critic also praised the renewed focus on Chuck and Ellie's relationship, and the additional complications of Stephen Bartowski's return, while Televisionary similarly praised Bakula's performance, citing him as ideally suited for the role.

== References to popular culture ==
- Scott Bakula says "Oh boy!" when confronted by Ellie about how he abandoned them after promising her pancakes for dinner. This is in reference to Bakula's character Dr. Samuel Beckett on the series Quantum Leap.
- Quantum Leap was also referenced in the opening promotion before airing, when Bakula announced the start of Chuck by mentioning he'd "been here before, but that's quite a leap." Quantum Leap also aired on NBC.
- Ted Roark is a caricature of various business and corporate technology leaders including Apple Inc. founder and CEO Steve Jobs, Microsoft founder Bill Gates, and industrialist Richard Branson. Roark's mention of "ballooning across the world" is similar to the adventures of Branson while the theatrics of the "launch party" for Roark's RIOS operating system is similar to events given by Jobs, known as Stevenotes. In particular, the style of headset, the dramatic countdown, and the informal attire worn by Roark are similar to Jobs, along with the awe and deference shown towards Roark by his fans. The accusations of theft made against Roark by Stephen Bartowski are similar to those made by Steve Jobs against Bill Gates.
- While welcoming two Japanese attendees at the RIOS launch conference, Ted Roark greets one of them saying "In-A-Gadda-Da-Vida", a reference to the popular song. It also references Chase's own movie, Fletch, where he threw out nonsensical foreign phrases throughout the film.
