= Ellie Woodcomb =

Fictional character in the television series Chuck

- Chuck character
- Sarah Lancaster as Ellie Bartowski-Woodcomb
- First appearance: "Chuck Versus the Intersect"
- Last appearance: "Chuck Versus the Goodbye"
- Portrayed by: Sarah Lancaster

In-universe information
- Full name: Eleanor Faye Bartowski Woodcomb
- Gender: Female
- Title: Doctor
- Occupation: Physician: Neurology
- Family: Chuck Bartowski (brother); Stephen J. Bartowski (father, deceased); Mary Elizabeth Bartowski (mother); Jesse Gunter (maternal grandfather); Mary Gunter (maternal grandmother); Sarah Bartowski (sister-in-law); Two brothers-in-law Dr. "Woody" Woodcomb (father-in-law); Dr. "Honey" Woodcomb (mother-in-law)
- Spouse: Dr. Devon Woodcomb
- Children: Clara Woodcomb

Eleanor Faye Bartowski Woodcomb, MD, PhD, is a fictional character who is the older sister of title character Chuck Bartowski on the television series Chuck. She is portrayed by actress Sarah Lancaster.

== Biography ==
Eleanor Faye Bartowski was born to Stephen and Mary Bartowski in 1978. With the exception of her younger brother, Chuck (Zachary Levi), little was initially known about the Bartowski family beyond that their mother left them when they were younger (Chuck was in the fifth grade) and that their father was "never really there." Her father, Stephen J. Bartowski, first appeared in the episode "Chuck Versus the Dream Job." Ellie attended and graduated from UCLA Medical School, where she met and went to school with her future husband, Devon Woodcomb. Devon was in love with her for three years ("give or take") before the events of "Chuck Versus the Seduction." They began dating when Devon gave her his sweater and said it was meant for her because the color matched her eyes. She also earned a Ph.D., although neither the discipline in which, nor the university where, she studied has been revealed as of the end of season four.

When her brother was expelled by Stanford University in 2003 he came back to Echo Park in Los Angeles to stay with her. For much of their lives growing up, Chuck and Ellie relied on each other, and after Chuck returned home, Ellie became one of his main sources of support as he recovered from Bryce Larkin's betrayal. At the beginning of the series, Ellie is throwing a birthday party for Chuck and has invited a number of her girlfriends for him to meet in hopes of helping him get past Jill. In "Chuck Versus the Subway", late in season 3, she learns that Chuck is a spy. In the season 4 opener "Chuck Versus the Anniversary" it is revealed Ellie and Devon are expecting a baby. Daughter Clara is born in the mid season episode "Chuck Versus the Push Mix".

== Series ==
Ellie Bartowski-Woodcomb is portrayed by actress Sarah Lancaster. She first appears in the series at the beginning of "Chuck Versus the Intersect," when Chuck tries to escape his birthday party which she arranged to try introducing him to real women. She remains one of the most important anchors between Chuck and his real life throughout the series, and her safety is one of his foremost concerns. When Chuck discovered Casey had bugged the home he shared with Ellie, he was even prepared to threaten Casey if he found out he was spying on her as well. When Chuck's extraction by the government was imminent, he made a point of telling her goodbye, and later asked Sarah to tell her something to make his disappearance "okay."

Most of Ellie's appearances in the series have been as part of the side-plots involving Chuck's real life and coworkers at the Buy More, so she has rarely figured prominently into the main arc. Her most significant role in the main plot of an episode came in "Chuck Versus the Truth," in which Ellie attempted to treat nuclear expert Mason Whitney when he was poisoned by Reardon Payne. When Whitney later died, Payne, disguised as a police officer taking a statement, exposed Ellie to the same toxic truth serum he used on Whitney to find where he hid his nuclear codes. Ellie nearly died as a result of the poisoning until Chuck administered the antidote. Although she was in a coma during this time, Ellie became the first person Chuck told about his secret life. She was also among the hostages in the Buy More when Ned Rhyerson crashed his car into the store while evading the police. For her sake, Chuck convinced Devon not to go through with a plan to overwhelm Ned, and later identified himself as the Intersect to Mauser to prevent him from killing her. The bracelet Chuck gave to Sarah in the same episode was a charm bracelet Chuck and Ellie's father gave to their mother when Ellie was born.

A major recurring thread in the series is the love/hate relationship she has with Chuck's best friend Morgan Grimes. Morgan has been in love with Ellie for a long time (or at the very least has a very strong crush on her), but Ellie is at first shown to barely tolerate him. However, as the series progresses, she and Morgan come to form something resembling a friendship, partly owing to them both missing Chuck as his spy life begins to interfere more frequently with his real life. Morgan also offers her support and comfort during a fight with Devon, where he admits he sees her as a sister (that he wants to have sex with so bad). Morgan's girlfriend Anna immediately takes a dislike to Ellie because of Morgan's long-standing crush.

Throughout the series, Ellie encourages Chuck and pushes him towards leaving the Buy More and doing something more suitable to his education level. After Chuck expressed misgivings about his relationship with Sarah in "Chuck Versus the Suburbs," she encouraged Chuck to break up with her, before Morgan reminded her that Sarah was the best thing that had happened to him in a long time. She was ecstatic when Chuck announced he was moving out and that he and Sarah would be getting a place together, but did not have a chance to react when Chuck later abruptly changed his mind.

Devon proposed to Ellie at the end of "Chuck Versus the Marlin," and she accepted. This began a secondary arc throughout the second season covering the preparations for the wedding. Ellie's regret that her father would not be there led Chuck to decide to track him down and promise that their father would be there. Their father indeed appeared at the end of the second season (see below). Ellie married Devon in the second-season finale.

In the third season, Ellie grows concerned that Chuck and Devon seem to be keeping secrets from her. The secrets really have to do with Devon being in on Chuck's spy life since late in season 2, and Devon always has trouble lying to her, but Ellie remains unaware of what they are keeping from her. She begins to snoop on Chuck—even enlisting Morgan, who shares suspicions about Chuck. Their suspicions are allayed when they catch Chuck sneaking around to make out with Hannah, but Ellie still takes note of Devon and Chuck being "thick as thieves."

Ellie gets her dream opportunity, a neurology fellowship at (UCLA rival) USC. Devon is initially opposed to the idea because he wants to get himself and Ellie away from the danger attendant with Chuck's spy life, but he relents, realizing how important the opportunity is to her. Soon she is granted a sabbatical, allowing her to take a year off so she can both pursue the fellowship and go to Africa with Doctors Without Borders as Devon planned.

In "Chuck Versus the Tooth" Ellie is manipulated by a Ring operative she met in Africa named Justin into believing that Casey is a double-agent and a threat to her father. While posing as a CIA operative, Justin recruits Ellie as an asset after she accidentally discovers a substantial amount of weaponry stashed away in Casey's apartment, and is tricked by Justin into revealing that Stephen left a means for his children to contact him. Their means of communication was through the advertising in newspapers, so they could send secret messages. However, Stephen came to Burbank, instead of revealing his whereabouts that Justin desired. When Ellie asked about what to do about Casey, Justin gave her a music box that could jam his communications. The box is later revealed to have a gun, which Justin urges her to use to shoot Casey, who was planting bugs around her apartment. Ellie couldn't bring herself to do it and instead struck Casey down with a frying pan before running to Justin. Unfortunately, he locked her in his office while lying that the CIA had safeguarded her father.

Ellie learned of her father and brother's involvement in the CIA in "Chuck Versus the Subway," and was instrumental in helping Devon and Morgan rescue the team from Daniel Shaw after witnessing her father's murder. Ellie approved Chuck's decision to finish Shaw and the Ring, but insisted he quit once they were defeated. However, Chuck would be drawn into the spy world once more with an unknown enemy that their father had been fighting.

In "Chuck Versus the Anniversary" Chuck was on his way to tell Ellie that he has to return to being a spy to find their mother, but she presumed that he was telling her that he's returning to the Buy More, now controlled by the U.S. government. In turn, she confides in her brother that she's pregnant. Ellie and Awesome are expecting a daughter. Although Ellie had discovered Chuck's work with the CIA during the previous season's finale, she did not actually see how good at it Chuck actually was—or how much he truly enjoyed the work—until "Chuck Versus the Coup d'Etat." She openly admitted being impressed with Chuck's skills when he and Sarah helped both Ellie and Devon, and Generalissimo Goya, escape a coup d'etat in Costa Gravas.

Ellie was briefly reunited with her mother in "Chuck Versus the First Fight," after Morgan arranged the visit as part of a plea deal in which Mary agreed to help the team locate Chuck following his capture by Volkoff agents. During the meeting, Mary explained to Ellie where she had been the last twenty years and also subtly provided hints relevant to a search Ellie was conducting for anything left behind for her by her father (prompted by Chuck's own inquiries if Stephen had done so). The story Mary told her about road trips in the family's old Mustang led her to the realization that a car she had seen in the classifieds of the newspaper—which she was searching due to her father's habit of leaving her coded messages in such a manner—was indeed left behind by Stephen as she suspected. With Devon's help Ellie recovered the vehicle and a note from her father. Hidden beneath one of the seats was one of his computers. She found it and Devon said he would take it. After Devon has Lester hack it to turn it on, there was a password that only Ellie knows, which was "Knock, Knock" and the answer was "I'm here".

The laptop contained her father's research on the Intersect in the brain from an engineer's perspective. She corrected it with her neuroscience but wasn't able to activate it through a new password which was known only by Chuck. Although Ellie was unaware of the purpose of her father's work, the corrections she made allowed Chuck to reactivate the Intersect.

In the episode "Chuck Versus the Muuurder", Ellie devotes her time to the research on the laptop, after it is given to her by National Clandestine Service Director Jane Bentley. When she is sleeping, the laptop scans her, and verifies her identity before accessing files on "Agent X".

In the series finale, Ellie moves with Devon, their daughter and Mary to Chicago.

== Development ==
Sarah Lancaster was cast in the role of Ellie Bartowski in March, 2007, joining Zachary Levi, Adam Baldwin and Yvonne Strahovski. On January 16, 2009 it was announced that Scott Bakula would be appearing as Chuck and Ellie's father Stephen in a three-episode story.

== Personality ==
Ironically, considering that Chuck's secret life has led him to save Ellie's on three occasions, she still plays the role of the over-protective older sister and deep-down still sees him as her baby brother. She frequently offers Chuck encouragement and advice on women in general, and his relationship with Sarah in particular. Although unaware of the truth of that relationship, Ellie is one of the first people to recognize that her interest in Chuck is genuine. She was immediately concerned when Chuck ran into Jill again and was meeting her for dinner to catch up.

She immediately took a liking to Sarah, and is one of the few characters who enjoys Casey's company or refers to him by first name ("He's so sweet!").

After Chuck, the most important person in Ellie's life is her husband, Devon Woodcomb. She's the only character who never refers to him as "Captain Awesome," although she did refer to his parents as the "Very Awesomes" when they were planning a visit. She loves him dearly, but under the effects of truth serum angrily complained about his frequent use of the word "awesome," and what she felt as moments of neglect of her feelings in the relationship. Ellie later accuses him of self-centeredness and disregard what she wanted when he bought a washer and dryer for their anniversary (as opposed to a big-screen TV).

Although usually calm and collected, Ellie becomes a nervous wreck and a perfectionist when she is required to be near Devon's parents, whom she refers to as the "Very Awesomes." In "Chuck Versus the Gravitron," Devon's parents are supposed to come over for Thanksgiving and Ellie's nervousness manifests with her cleaning at a hurried pace, cooking multiple turkeys (which she promptly throws in the trash for flaws only she notices) and uninviting Morgan. Ellie was greatly intimidated during a visit from Devon's parents, and was quickly driven to frustration by Honey Woodcomb's interference with the wedding plans, but hits her breaking point when Woody offers to walk her down the aisle (the only part of the wedding she imagined was her father doing this). She was also deeply disturbed by her perception of Devon's bachelor party, after seeing incriminating photographs taken by Lester of an unconscious Devon with Agent Forrest (dressed as a cop-themed stripper). She was hurt, and believes Chuck and Morgan are covering up willful actions taken by Devon during the party (she later learned the truth). And like Chuck, Ellie also has a trusting nature, which the Ring used to manipulate her into thinking that her handler was CIA and that Casey was a double agent.

It is unknown whether she has the same ability to absorb and retain visual information as her father and brother.
