= Fulcrum (Chuck) =

Fictional spy organization on the TV series Chuck

Fulcrum is the codename of a hostile fictional espionage organization in the television series Chuck. Fulcrum serves as the primary antagonist throughout the show's first two seasons, although their specific goals, beyond acquiring the Intersect, remain undisclosed.

Sections of a large diagram on the back of Chuck Bartowski's Tron poster.
Left: What appears to be an uprooted bonsai tree next to the notes "Fulcrum symbol?" and "True meaning?"
Right: The symbol that accompanies flashes associated with Fulcrum.

== History ==
Very little specific information has been revealed so far about the organization known as Fulcrum, although they have been in existence for at least as early as 2003. They are a rogue faction within the US intelligence community, described as a Central Intelligence Agency (CIA) splinter faction but said to have people in every agency. They also have hired professional mercenaries and have contracted civilians when their skills are required. Fulcrum has been attempting to acquire the Intersect database, and attempted to turn Bryce Larkin and use him to acquire the computer.

== Development ==
Fulcrum was introduced in the first season's episode "Chuck Versus the Nemesis." The organization remained a threat for the remainder of the season, most prominently in "Chuck Versus the Marlin." Josh Schwartz revealed in an interview with Sci Fi Magazine that season two would focus more specifically on Fulcrum and the main story arc. However while the organization has played an increasingly larger and more threatening role in the series, little definite information has been revealed on their structure. Chuck has been positively identified as the Intersect by at least three different agents but beyond being a person of interest, he has yet to be specifically targeted, although Fulcrum operatives are familiar with him as "Agent Carmichael." Fulcrum's parent organization knows something is happening in the Buy More but believe that it is something unrelated to the Intersect, believing it to be a CIA substation.

At the end of "Chuck Versus the Lethal Weapon", it is revealed that Chuck has been keeping a complex diagram hidden behind his Tron poster detailing connections between the Intersect and several Fulcrum agents. "Chuck Versus the Ring" reveals that Fulcrum is only one part of a broader organization known as "the Ring."

=== Motives ===
Although some of Fulcrum's motives have been revealed, it is unclear what their full agenda is. They are known to be in pursuit of the Intersect and have also attempted to break into Castle, but neither Jill nor Leader identified Chuck as a person of interest beyond what he could tell them about the facility's computer systems and in actually gaining access to it. While they are shown having international contacts such as the Russian seductress Sasha Banachek, there has been no indication of whether their interests are restricted solely to the United States or if they have international objectives as well. It is known that MI6 is also involved with tracking Fulcrum's activities, as they planted agent Cole Barker in the organization.

In the episode "Chuck Versus the Suburbs", it is revealed that Fulcrum has developed their own Intersect, which they successfully upload into Chuck's brain. Previous episodes show the government attempting to use the original Intersect on government agents as a way to give them information that they could access instantaneously, but according to Fulcrum operatives Sylvia and Brad, the CIA has abandoned the project and Fulcrum wants to restart their own.

Dialogue between Chuck and several Fulcrum agents suggest that they may believe they're trying to protect the country, in a case of the ends justifying the means. Specifically, they expressed contempt for the CIA abandoning the Intersect and trying to "slug it out" in the War on Terror using Cold War tactics, and Fulcrum hoped that the Intersect would create more effective agents "ready to fight tomorrow's wars." Later, in "Chuck Versus the First Kill", a Fulcrum recruiting session heavily promotes "strength" and "leadership" and includes the words, "We live a dangerous world, and you want to do something about it." Fulcrum agents in "Chuck Versus the Lethal Weapon" stated that they consider themselves patriots.

=== One part of the Ring ===
Fulcrum is one of many smaller organizations making up the Ring. However, the exact nature of the connection between the groups has never been established. It seems that only higher level Fulcrum agents may be aware that they are being operated by The Ring, as in the series finale, a Fulcrum agent possesses a piece of a device that The Ring possesses another part of, and furthermore he believes that Fulcrum is superior to The Ring as a terrorist network. Vincent, the Fulcrum agent assigned to track down Stephen Bartowski, is shown to have direct access to the Council, despite being subordinate to Ted Roark. It is also unclear if Fulcrum's own apparent goal—defending the United States through any means necessary—is independent of the Ring's own objectives, or furthers the Ring's global agenda.

== Leadership ==
Much like the CIA, Fulcrum appears to assign higher-ranking or more experienced handlers to their assets. Tommy Delgado attempted to recruit Bryce Larkin and commanded the operation attempting to recover the Intersect. Before his execution, Frank Mauser also implied that he was a person of unusual importance within the organization, though the meaning of this was not made clear in the episode. Few other details have been revealed about Fulcrum's command structure.

=== Tommy Delgado ===
Tommy (Anthony Ruivivar), born November 4, 1970, in Honolulu, Hawaii, is the operative who initially attempts to use Bryce Larkin to steal the Intersect, and was part of the failed operation to have him smuggled back into the country by the Demetrios ring. He later deduced that Bryce Larkin was a decoy and that Chuck was the real Intersect. He was later arrested and has not been seen in the show since, however he is still involved with tracking the Intersect from his cell.

It was a "flash" on Tommy that first revealed Fulcrum's existence to Chuck. Until Jill was revealed to be a Fulcrum agent, Tommy was the only Fulcrum agent to have appeared in more than one episode, and a picture of Tommy is seen on Chuck's diagram detailing the connections between the Intersect and several Fulcrum members. He was played by Anthony Ruivivar as cool and ruthless, with no compunctions against killing innocent civilians in pursuit of his mission objectives.

Tommy's birth date and birthplace are the same as the actor who plays him.

Though he appears in only two episodes, Tommy is one of the most important characters in the show's mythology, as his actions set the plot in motion. He could also be seen as the main antagonist of the first season.

=== Leader ===
Leader (played by Patrick Kilpatrick) is the Fulcrum handler of Dr. Jill Roberts. Little is known about him, including his real name.

Leader is a tough, hardened operative. It is currently unknown whether he had any knowledge of Bryce Larkin, the Intersect, or what Fulcrum intended to do with Castle once they took control, however his position overseeing the operation indicates he is ranked somewhere above an ordinary field operative. The incident is the first confirmed instance of two Fulcrum agents working directly in tandem on the same operation. Leader is a talented and in his own words, "devious", strategist and arranged his own capture to gain access to Castle by using Chuck's own feelings for Jill against him.

=== Frank Mauser ===
Lt. Mauser was born on January 14, 1958, in Joliet, IL. A long-time LAPD negotiator, it is believed that he developed extensive ties with Fulcrum during his time as commandant of the LA Police Academy.

When the employees of the Buy More were taken hostage by Ned Rhyerson, Lt. Frank Mauser (Michael Rooker) took control as hostage negotiator.

Mauser orchestrated the entire incident with Ned as his partner—from the high-speed police chase, to the car crashing into the Buy More and the hostage situation—all to identify who Casey and Sarah are assigned to protect.

Mauser's exact position within Fulcrum is unknown, however his claims that Fulcrum would be determined to rescue him indicates he held a fairly high rank within the organization. He was highly intelligent and his plan nearly succeeded in both identifying and capturing the Intersect, making him the closest any of their agents have come to achieving their goal (only Tommy and Lizzie had positively identified Chuck before, though Colt may have been suspicious). He knew both Casey and Sarah were assigned to protect someone within the Buy More, and arranged for Ned to eliminate Casey as a threat by feigning to accidentally shoot him in the foot, enough to disable him but a minor enough wound to keep the following negotiations believable. The operation required a high level of planning only seen before by Leader's operation to access Castle.

In addition to his tactical abilities, Mauser was highly skilled in hand-to-hand combat, possibly even superior to Sarah. Though he surrendered, he was executed by Sarah due to the extreme threat he presented to Chuck.

=== Duncan ===
Duncan (Vincent Duvall), born on December 15, 1975, in Chicago, IL, is Dr. Busgang's Fulcrum handler and part of the team developing the Fulcrum Intersect. He was responsible for Cole's capture at the end of "Chuck Versus the Beefcake", and attempted to extract Chuck's identity from him by means of torture. Duncan says that the members of Fulcrum are "patriots" who "do what needs to be done to preserve this nation's rightful place in the world." Duncan executed Busgang before being shot and killed by Sarah.

According to NBC.com, Duncan was once a Marine Corps sniper who was honorably discharged after serving with distinction during Operation Desert Storm. He joined Fulcrum due to growing disillusionment after his discharge.

=== Vincent Smith ===
Vincent (Arnold Vosloo) was born on May 7, 1972, in Denver, CO. He is the head of the Fulcrum team in search of Orion, the Intersect designer, and has been tracking him for three years. He eventually managed to locate him in Hong Kong, narrowly missing a lethal trap set up by Orion. He kidnaps Chuck in hopes of luring Orion into the open to capture him but his plan is foiled by Sarah and Casey, who shoot him before he escapes.

In "Chuck Versus the Dream Job", Vincent was revealed to have survived his wound and escaped capture. He was working with Ted Roark in the efforts to capture Stephen Bartowski. Vincent returned again in "Chuck Versus the Colonel", and was tracking Chuck and Sarah for Roark after they went AWOL at the end of "Chuck Versus the First Kill". He briefly captured Sarah before Chuck ran him over with their car but survived his injuries. He captures the team when they assault Black Rock to rescue Stephen, and was apparently inside the drive-in when the F-16 air strike occurred, dying as a result.

Vincent was a former US Army Ranger (rank of Second Lieutenant) believed to be killed in action in Khowst, Afghanistan. In reality, his death was staged and he went underground working for Fulcrum. He is a native of Louisville, KY and originally enlisted into the U.S. Army Reserve in October 1985 as a combat engineer. He was commissioned from the University of Kentucky ROTC program as a distinguished military graduate in May 1989. He graduated in December 1990 with a bachelor of arts in geography. He entered active duty in February 1991 as a chemical officer. From June 1994 to June 1996, he successfully completed and graduated from the Special Forces Assessment and Selection course at Fort Bragg. He became a member of Fulcrum in June 2000. Vincent's surprise return in "Chuck Versus the Dream Job" makes him the first adversary of Operation Bartowski to have appeared in two non-continuous story arcs (previously, Dr. Jill Roberts and Tommy Delgado appeared in consecutive episodes while Brad White was mentioned and part of his corpse shown in "Chuck Versus the Beefcake" after his death two episodes previously in "Chuck Versus the Suburbs").

Vincent has been compared to South Park's Kenny McCormick. In his three appearances so far in the series, Vincent was blown-up, shot, poisoned himself, shot again, smashed in a door by Stephen Bartowski, run over with a Dodge Challenger by Chuck, and knocked unconscious in the Intersect control booth by Sarah right before it was destroyed by an air strike.

=== Theodore "Ted" Roark ===
Ted Roark (Chevy Chase) was born on January 23, 1949, in New York, NY. He is the founder and CEO of Roark Instruments and is the nemesis of Stephen J. Bartowski. He is credited with creating some of today's most successful computer technologies. Early in "Chuck Versus the Dream Job", Stephen tells Chuck that he and Roark were once partners and graduate school classmates, but Roark stole many of his ideas as his own. Despite operating successfully in the United States, his firm has been implicated in several suspect technology transfer deals. He has been under CIA surveillance for at least 18 months. He is in charge of creating the new Intersect for Fulcrum. At the end of "Chuck Versus the Dream Job", he captures Chuck and his father, now revealed as Orion, and forces Stephen to help him finish the Intersect. The episode revealed few other details about the relationship between Roark and Stephen Bartowski, but Roark did not initially know that Chuck was Stephen's son.

Roark reappears in "Chuck Versus the Colonel". He gives Stephen until the next morning to finish the Intersect, threatening to kill his family. Stephen covertly double-crosses him and reprograms the computer to instead remove the Intersect images from Chuck's head when Roark tries to use it to upload the Intersect into a group of Fulcrum agents. Roark discovers the deception when he fails to flash on any of his test data. After Beckman's airstrike begins, Roark flees and is apparently killed when a bomb detonates near him while trying to get to cover, but the end of the episode reveals he survived the attack and plans to disrupt Ellie's wedding.

In "Chuck Versus the Ring", Roark threatens to kill Ellie if Chuck does not turn over the Intersect, however he is thwarted by Chuck, Sarah, Stephen, Bryce Larkin, and a special forces team led by John Casey. Roark is arrested and detained in a cell in Castle. He is later executed by a member of Casey's team who is subsequently revealed to be a member of a mysterious espionage conglomerate known as "the Ring."

Roark is mentioned again in the finale, where it is revealed that a device called The Key was split between the three main Intersect designers. Roark kept his piece of the device for Fulcrum's uses.

It is suggested on the DVD commentary that Roark is the boss of Fulcrum, although he is still only a subordinate to The Ring. He is ultimately the main antagonist of season two.

=== Bernie Ominsky ===
"Uncle Bernie" (Ken Davitian) is a friend of Jill's father. His code name is Carnivore, perhaps because of his past achievement of eating a 96-ounce steak in less than an hour. He is the one who first recruited Jill to Fulcrum. He would screen Jill's boyfriends and if he didn't approve they would disappear. Jill suggested that he was the only one who would know where Chuck's captured father would be held. To draw him away from his Fulcrum protectors, Jill and Chuck pretend to be engaged and throw a party. When Bernie realizes that Chuck is working with the government, he chases them down and tries to kill him, but dies from a heart attack while attempting to beat Chuck with a baseball bat. His death is counted as Chuck's first confirmed kill.

His name is likely a reference to the title character of Weekend at Bernie's. After his death, Casey, Chuck, Jill, and Sarah took him from the Roberts house, pretending that he was still alive by moving him and speaking for him, an obvious homage to this movie.

=== Bill Bergey ===
Bill (Christopher Cousins) headed up a major Fulcrum base masquerading as a leadership development center. In addition to detention cells for prisoners and hostages, his facility was also used for recruitment. Team Bartowski infiltrated it in an effort to rescue Stephen Bartowski. Bill identified Chuck and Casey, and had Stephen moved. He attempted to kill Chuck but accidentally defenestrated himself. Chuck tried to save his life, but Bill was killed when his suit sleeve ripped and sent him plummeting to the parking lot fifteen stories down.

Bill's sole appearance was in "Chuck Versus the First Kill". Little other information has been provided on the character, but he seemed surprised that Chuck was willing to save his life whether he talked or not. The Bill Bergey name was actually borrowed from the linebacker who played twelve seasons in the National Football League with the Cincinnati Bengals and Philadelphia Eagles.

== Operatives ==
A number of Fulcrum operatives have been identified by Operation Bartowski over the course of the series. Most of Fulcrum's agents are recruited from within the CIA, and are made up of field operatives and specialists. Fulcrum's recruiting efforts include corporate-style leadership seminars as a front, and Jill Roberts claims that when Fulcrum recruits students, they are given the job of their choice after college as enticement, and this contributes to handlers controlling every aspect of the recruit's life.

=== Lizzie Shafai ===
Lizzie (Noureen DeWulf) was born on July 2, 1981, in Lexington, KY and was given a cover job working as the delivery girl for the Pita Palace restaurant near the Buy More after Tommy's arrest, which she monitored via bugs. Her preferred listening device was the short-range GLG-20, which required a receiver located on-site. Although she took advantage of her looks to deflect attention, Lizzie is a trained killer and quite formidable in hand-to-hand combat. She identified Chuck as the Intersect from her bugs and nearly captured him before being stopped by Sarah. Also, she unknowingly interfered in Devon's proposal plan because she stole Ellie's engagement ring and wanted to keep it for herself, although she lost in a pile of garbage

=== Juliette ===
Juliette (Bianca Chiminello) contracted software magnate Von Hayes to crack a stolen microchip containing an upgrade for the Intersect. She was apprehended after being shot by Casey.

=== Barry Rommell ===
Barry Rommell (Zach Hanks) was a Fulcrum agent assigned to eliminate Guy LaFleur, an expert on pathology and biological engineering who uncovered an attempt to develop a deadly strain of influenza as a biological weapon. Little else is known about Rommell, including whether or not this was his real name or an alias. He was shot and killed by Sarah. At the time of his death, he was carrying CIA credentials, and General Beckman positively identified him as a former CIA agent. His codename while working for Fulcrum was Wolf Den.

=== Alexander Winterborne ===
Alexander Winterborne (Mark Pellegrino) was a Fulcrum agent assigned to follow up on the failed effort to recover a listing of Fulcrum agents from Guy LaFleur. Little else is known about him, other than he was once a member of the CIA Infectious Disease Task Force. After his role in the second season, he makes a cameo appearance in the series finale, "Chuck Versus the Goodbye", when he has a meeting on a plane with Nicholas Quinn.

=== Jill Roberts ===
Dr. Jill Roberts (Jordana Brewster) is a prominent figure in the series mythology, though she did not appear until the middle of the second season. Jill is Chuck's ex-girlfriend from Stanford. She has made the most recurring appearances among Fulcrum agents in the series (with four appearances), surpassing Ted Roark and Vincent, who have each made three appearances.

=== Nathan Rhyerson ===
Nathan Edward (Ned) Rhyerson (aka Needlenose Ned) (Jed Rees) was born on February 2, 1972, in Glendale, CA. He is unmarried and has no criminal record. He leads Burbank police on a 20-mile high speed car chase before crashing his car into the Burbank Buy More as part of a complex Fulcrum plot to determine the whereabouts of Bryce and the Intersect, as well as to determine who Sarah and Casey were protecting at the Buy More. He pretends to be a frightened and confused amateur criminal, though he was later revealed to be much more capable than he initially let on. Rhyerson is neutralized when Morgan, Big Mike, and Captain Awesome use a pneumatic snow flocking machine to disorient and disarm him.

His name is likely an homage to the character Ned Ryerson from Groundhog Day.

=== Sylvia Arculin ===
Sylvia (Jenny McCarthy) was one of the main Fulcrum agents involved in the project to develop the Fulcrum Intersect. She posed as a flirtatious and unfaithful housewife to one of Chuck and Sarah's neighbors while working undercover in a suburban cul-de-sac investigating possible terrorist activity. She attempted to seduce and capture Chuck to test the Fulcrum Intersect on him, however Chuck managed to escape after inadvertently uploading the test database.

Sylvia's fate at the end of the episode was not conclusively revealed.

She, along with Cliff, Brad, and Vanessa, appear on the chart hidden behind Chuck's Tron poster.

=== Cliff Arculin ===
Cliff's (Brian Thompson) real name is Cliff Siljak, and he was born on April 16, 1958, in Los Angeles, CA. He used to be a top CIA brain scientist. He was shunned by the wider CIA community due to rumors his experiments bordered closer to torture than actual science, which led to his involvement with Fulcrum. He was one of the undercover Fulcrum agents who lived in the Meadow Branch suburban development and was undercover as Sylvia's husband. Cliff apparently survived the activation of the Fulcrum Intersect and is now incarcerated.

=== Brad White ===
Brad White (Andy Richter), born June 21, 1966, in Ann Arbor, Michigan, was one of several Fulcrum operatives placed in the Meadow Branch suburban development as part of the project to develop the Fulcrum Intersect. As part of his cover, he befriended Chuck and Sarah (who were undercover as a young married couple while investigating the neighborhood under Beckman's orders) intending to use them in the Intersect experiments. He is a former conman.

Brad revealed that Fulcrum chose to build its own Intersect after the government abandoned the project, expressing disgust with their decision to rely on Cold War-era counterintelligence techniques. He was killed when Chuck signaled Casey to activate the Fulcrum Intersect, as his brain could not handle the vast amount of data. Later, his grave is dug up by MI-6 agent Cole Barker to retrieve information on the Fulcrum Intersect.

=== Vanessa White ===
Vanessa (Alison Simpson) was one of the undercover Fulcrum agents who lived in the Meadow Branch suburban development. She acted as Brad's wife, though it is unclear if the two are actually married. Her fate at the end of the episode is unknown.

=== Alexis White ===
Alexis (Katrina Law) was a Fulcrum operative who tried to retrieve the chip taken from Brad White which contained the identity of the Intersect. She commits suicide to avoid capture. Her last words are "Fulcrum wins." During Chuck's flash on her in the Buy More, the files show Alexis performing several bloody interrogations on both men and women, suggesting that torture may be her particular specialty. Alexis was briefly mentioned by General Beckman before a review of the Intersect project by a military panel to counter claims by Daniel Shaw that Chuck was going out of control due to the Intersect. Shaw flashed on Alexis's name, and although Chuck witnessed and recognized that Shaw had flashed, was unable to prove his allegation.

== Other ==
Fulcrum also has outside contacts. Many of these have been civilians or government workers unaware of the truth of Fulcrum's motives. They are often deceived or coerced into working for Fulcrum.

=== Bryce Larkin ===
Fulcrum attempted to recruit Bryce to steal the Intersect. However, Bryce destroyed the Intersect and sent the only copy to Chuck.

=== Von Hayes ===
Von Hayes (Steve Valentine) was born on August 31, 1968, in London, England. He is a software engineer hired by Fulcrum to decrypt Intersect refresh data stolen from NSA facilities. When Team Bartowski prevents the delivery of Hayes' decrypted information to Fulcrum, he holds the information hostage, demanding immunity from prosecution and a large cash payment in exchange for his cooperation. He is not a spy and has not been trained in espionage or negotiation. His name is an homage to the outfielder who played twelve seasons in Major League Baseball with the Cleveland Indians, Philadelphia Phillies, and California Angels.

=== Guy Lafleur ===
Guy Lafleur (William Abadie), born November 28, 1966, in Évreux, France, is a virologist and the head research scientist for Cole-Macgregor Pharmaceuticals, where he is developing a cure for influenza. His research leads to the development of an antiviral agent that rendered useless one of Cole-Macgregor's most powerful bioweapons. When Lafleur attempts to go public with his findings, he is murdered by a Fulcrum assassin. He works closely with Jill Roberts, Chuck's former girlfriend. Along with his work in virology, he also obtains a list of Fulcrum agents, which he hides on an encrypted flash drive in his hotel room in a puzzle box. He is apparently incredibly paranoid with respect to password security. The character's name is borrowed from the Hall of Famer who played seventeen seasons in the National Hockey League with the Montreal Canadiens, New York Rangers and Quebec Nordiques.

=== Howard Busgang ===
Dr. Howard Busgang (Robert Picardo), born March 7, 1960, in Westport, CT, is a Department of Defense scientist who specializes in mapping the human brain's cognitive and spatial function. He is working for Fulcrum during the development of their version of the Intersect, under the code-name "Perseus", believing that he is working for the government. Chuck accidentally shot Busgang in the leg when Chuck attempted to rescue Casey and Sarah, and escaped to a hospital.

Busgang claimed he did not realize a Human Intersect was possible. He was shot and killed by his Fulcrum handler. He was revealed to have been one of the men involved in designing the Intersect computer, which attracted Fulcrum's attention. In the episode he professed that he did not know who he was really working for, and thought he was working legitimately for the government.

== See also ==
- The Ring (Chuck)
