= Chuck season 3 =

Chuck
- Season 3
- Season 3 DVD box set
- No. of episodes: 19

Release
- Original network: NBC
- Original release: January 10 – May 24, 2010

Season chronology
- ← Previous; Season 2 Next → Season 4

The third season of Chuck was announced on May 17, 2009 with 13 episodes, with NBC reserving the option of nine more episodes. Production for the third season began on August 6, 2009. On October 28, 2009, NBC added 6 more episodes to the third season which brings the season total to 19. On November 19, NBC announced that Chuck would return mid-season on January 10 with two back-to-back episodes before it would move to Monday nights to its 8 pm time-slot on January 11.

== Cast and characters ==
=== Main cast ===
- Zachary Levi as Chuck Bartowski (19 episodes) (Note: As of "Chuck Versus the American Hero", Chuck is officially promoted to CIA Agent.)
- Yvonne Strahovski as Sarah Walker (19 episodes)
- Joshua Gomez as Morgan Grimes (16 episodes)
- Ryan McPartlin as Devon Woodcomb (14 episodes)
- Mark Christopher Lawrence as Michael "Big Mike" Tucker (10 episodes)
- Scott Krinsky as Jeff Barnes (15 episodes)
- Vik Sahay as Lester Patel (15 episodes)
- Sarah Lancaster as Ellie Bartowski-Woodcomb (15 episodes)
- Adam Baldwin as Colonel John Casey (19 episodes)

=== Recurring cast ===
- Bonita Friedericy as Diane Beckman (14 episodes)
- Brandon Routh as Daniel Shaw (11 episodes)
- Scott Holroyd as Justin Sullivan (5 episodes)
- Kristin Kreuk as Hannah (4 episodes)
- Scott Bakula as Stephen J. Bartowski (3 episodes)
- Mekenna Melvin as Alex McHugh (3 episodes)
- John Ott as Agent Carlson (3 episodes)

=== Notable guest stars ===
- Mark Sheppard as The Director (2 episodes)
- Mini Andén as Carina Miller (1 episode)
- Julia Ling as Anna Wu (1 episode)
- Tony Hale as Emmett Millbarge (1 episode)

== Episodes ==
No. overall	No. in season	Title	Directed by	Written by	Original release date	Prod. code	US viewers (millions)
36	1	"Chuck Versus the Pink Slip"	Robert Duncan McNeill	Chris Fedak & Matt Miller	January 10, 2010	3X5801	7.70
With his new Intersect abilities, Chuck now wants to be a real spy, but nobody said that was easy - As the upgraded Intersect, Chuck trains to become a full-fledged spy but hits rock bottom when he flunks out of spy school and loses Sarah in the process. Meanwhile, Morgan comes home from Benihana School to help Chuck get over Sarah. Chuck interferes with an operation Casey and Sarah are on, and Emmett Milbarge is killed by a Ring operative.
37	2	"Chuck Versus the Three Words"	Peter Lauer	Allison Adler & Scott Rosenbaum	January 10, 2010	3X5802	7.20
Chuck must learn to control his emotions so he can be a spy. Even if he's still in love with Sarah - Chuck gets a new mission when Sarah's best friend Carina (returning guest star Mini Anden) comes to town with her fiancé Karl (Vinnie Jones). Things get complicated when Chuck wants to hash out his and Sarah's relationship problems while they're on the mission. Meanwhile, Morgan finds himself in trouble when he lies to Jeff and Lester.
38	3	"Chuck Versus the Angel de la Muerte"	Jeremiah Chechik	Phil Klemmer	January 11, 2010	3X5803	7.36
Premier Allejandro Goya (Armand Assante), the dictator of a fictitious South American nation called Costa Gravas whom Casey attempted to assassinate in the past, has come to the United States to announce that his country will be holding open, democratic elections for the first time. After an assassination attempt on the dictator, team Bartowski is ordered to get his medical journal to find out the cause of his heart attack, only to find out that Chuck's brother-in-law, Devon Woodcomb, is the dictator's doctor.
39	4	"Chuck Versus Operation Awesome"	Robert Duncan McNeill	Zev Borow	January 18, 2010	3X5804	6.65
A Ring agent named Sydney (Angie Harmon) mistakes Chuck's brother in-law Devon for the world-class spy in the neighborhood and attempts to recruit him to the Ring. Devon and Chuck receive timely assistance from Daniel Shaw (Brandon Routh), an expert on the Ring. Rather than use Devon to get at Sydney as Shaw recommends, Chuck reveals to Sydney his identity as the real spy, taking over the operation which results in a showdown with her cell of Ring agents. Meanwhile, Morgan is promoted back to assistant manager, and must shut down the employee "fight club" started by Lester, after being accidentally assaulted by Chuck as a result of a Kung Fu flash.
40	5	"Chuck Versus First Class"	Fred Toye	Chris Fedak	January 25, 2010	3X5805	6.98
Shaw sends Chuck on his first solo mission, battling a Ring agent (Stone Cold Steve Austin) at 30,000 feet on a plane ride to Paris, on which he also meets Hannah (Kristin Kreuk). Meanwhile, Lester continues to lead a mini rebellion against Morgan, so Morgan is forced to enlist the help of Casey in order to control the Buy More employees.
41	6	"Chuck Versus the Nacho Sampler"	Allan Kroeker	Matt Miller & Scott Rosenbaum	February 1, 2010	3X5806	6.73
Chuck neglects training Hannah for the Nerd Herd as he's tasked with handling an asset connected to the Ring. Meanwhile, Ellie and Morgan begin to suspect something strange is going on with Chuck.
42	7	"Chuck Versus the Mask"	Michael Schultz	Phil Klemmer	February 8, 2010	3X5807	6.60
Chuck must protect Hannah when they find themselves partners on a mission. Meanwhile, Morgan and Ellie continue their mission to get to the bottom of Chuck's secretive and strange behavior.
43	8	"Chuck Versus the Fake Name"	Jeremiah Chechik	Allison Adler	March 1, 2010	3X5808	6.70
Chuck promises to cook dinner for Hannah, Ellie and Awesome. However, he must first assume the identity of the world's most dangerous assassin for his latest mission. Meanwhile, Sarah tries to maintain a strictly professional relationship with Shaw.
44	9	"Chuck Versus the Beard"	Zachary Levi	Scott Rosenbaum	March 8, 2010	3X5809	6.37
Chuck feels like his life is falling apart when he can't flash and gets left behind for a mission. While Shaw, Sarah and Casey go on without him, Chuck finds himself in a sticky situation back at the base, especially when Ring agents infiltrate the Buy More and Morgan begins to investigate.
45	10	"Chuck Versus the Tic Tac"	Patrick Norris	Rafe Judkins & Lauren LeFranc	March 15, 2010	3X5810	5.85
Casey commits treason in order to save his old fiancée from the Ring, and Chuck and Sarah must break him out of jail to clear his name. A dream fellowship awaits Ellie.
46	11	"Chuck Versus the Final Exam"	Robert Duncan McNeill	Zev Borow	March 22, 2010	3X5811	5.46
Chuck's fate as a spy rests on a single mission. He learns that his latest solo mission will be a final test to see if he is ready to be a spy and needs to put everything he has learned into action to avoid going back to his old life, while Sarah and Shaw observe his every move. Chuck is unaware of the impact that this mission may have on his relationship with Sarah, when he is assigned to kill an agency mole as the final part of his mission.
47	12	"Chuck Versus the American Hero"	Jeremiah Chechik	Story by : Max Denby; Teleplay by : Matt Miller & Phil Klemmer	March 29, 2010	3X5812	5.68
Chuck has his pick of the best CIA agents for an undercover operation, but he has only one girl in mind for the job, Sarah, who is now involved with Shaw. Casey, Morgan and Awesome team up to help Chuck win her back. Shaw turns himself in to the Ring and is taken into their secret base beneath an old warehouse, where he finds out exactly who killed his wife. Chuck also finds the Ring's base when he contacts Jeff and Lester who were incidentally on a mission to stalk "Sarah's new boyfriend".
48	13	"Chuck Versus the Other Guy"	Peter Lauer	Chris Fedak	April 5, 2010	3X5813	5.79
Shaw is emotionally devastated after he finds out that Sarah murdered his wife. He goes off with Sarah, who is completely unaware. Chuck assembles a strike team to rescue her, and although Shaw does not cause Sarah any harm, things get complicated when the team infiltrates the Ring's headquarters in an attempt to capture the director. Morgan leaves the Buy More again, this time hoping to become a part of Team Bartowski. A shocking revelation occurs when Morgan sees surveillance footage from the team's mission in the headquarters, and notices that a fight between Shaw and some Ring operatives appears to be staged. Casey is reinstated by General Beckman. Shaw is shown to have defected to the Ring, and when he tries to kill Sarah, Chuck then shoots Shaw.
49	14	"Chuck Versus the Honeymooners"	Robert Duncan McNeill	Story by : Allison Adler; Teleplay by : Rafe Judkins & Lauren LeFranc	April 26, 2010	3X5814	5.78
While travelling to Zürich (trying to escape their spy lives), Sarah and Chuck realize they're traveling on the same train as Diego, a Basque terrorist, and his companions. Even though they're all alone, they decide to take on these rogue agents behind each others back. They each realize that the other is also on the case and work together, posing as a Texan couple on their honeymoon. Of course, this impromptu mission doesn't go smoothly as it turns out that the "terrorists" accompanying Diego are actually undercover Interpol agents guarding him. Meanwhile, Beckman orders her newest "unlikely" spy team – John Casey and Morgan Grimes – to track down the missing couple. The duo succeeds and they catch up with Chuck and Sarah, just in time to help them fight off true Russian spies who used to work with Diego (and are now trying to eliminate him). Meanwhile, Ellie is upset Chuck doesn't come for her going away party. In the end, Chuck and Ellie reconcile and he and Sarah agree to date while remaining spies. They admit this to the General, who warns them of the dangers, while also congratulating them (unofficially).
50	15	"Chuck Versus the Role Models"	Fred Toye	Phil Klemmer	May 3, 2010	3X5815	5.35
Chuck and Sarah are assigned to train under Craig (Fred Willard) and Laura Turner (Swoosie Kurtz), a married CIA team who, despite their impeccable record, hate one another. The Turners' stormy relationship forces Chuck and Sarah to wonder if they're doomed with the same fate. Meanwhile, Casey must train the newest member of the team - Morgan.
51	16	"Chuck Versus the Tooth"	Daisy von Scherler Mayer	Zev Borow & Max Denby	May 10, 2010	3X5816	5.33
Chuck struggles with disturbing dreams and believes his most recent dream predicts danger for the President of Zamibia, who is visiting the country. General Beckman, however, is unconvinced and assigns Chuck to meet with a CIA psychiatrist Dr. Leo Dreyfus (Christopher Lloyd). Meanwhile, Ellie and Devon have returned from Africa, due to the Devon contracting a disease resembling malaria. It was revealed that a Ring operative named Justin, posing as a ranger in Africa, deliberately infected Devon with the disease, in order to secretly coerce the couple into returning to the USA. Justin then surprises Ellie when appearing at the Buy More, and tells her that he is a CIA agent working to protect her father, Stephen Bartowski, from John Casey. He tells Ellie that John is a dangerous NSA agent, and uses her to lure Stephen out of hiding in order to carry out The Ring's agenda. Anna Wu (Julia Ling) returns to the Buy More to try to get Morgan back. It is revealed that the Intersect 2.0 puts stress on Chuck's brain that promotes mental deterioration.
52	17	"Chuck Versus the Living Dead"	Jay Chandrasekhar	Lauren LeFranc & Rafe Judkins	May 17, 2010	3X5817	5.20
Chuck dreams that Daniel Shaw is still alive, and things become awkward between him and Sarah during the investigation, when Casey goes through files and receipts describing Sarah and Shaw's trip to Washington DC together weeks earlier. Stephen Bartowski (Scott Bakula) returns and learns that Chuck downloaded the Intersect 2.0. He tells Chuck that he has created a device - The Governor - to calm the mind and prevent the intersect's negative side effects. It is revealed that this is why The Ring wanted Justin to capture Stephen Bartowski - to take the Governor and use it to support the brain of their own human intersect, Daniel Shaw.
53	18	"Chuck Versus the Subway"	Matt Shakman	Story by : Matt Miller; Teleplay by : Allison Adler & Phil Klemmer	May 24, 2010	3X5818	4.96
Chuck sees Shaw in a Los Angeles subway train, and the team works to find out where he was going and what he was doing. While following Shaw's tracks, they enter a building through the subway that appears to belong to the CIA. It is revealed that this is where Ellie has been meeting with Justin regarding her father, and the team walk in on a Joint Chief conference during which General Beckman was testifying regarding whether or not Operation Bartowski was becoming a liability. Ellie becomes aware of Chuck and Sarah's lives as spies. It is revealed that The Ring has taken control of the CIA and NSA, and General Beckman is apprehended. Casey reveals who he really is to his estranged daughter, Alex. After giving the Governor to Chuck, Stephen is murdered by Shaw. Shaw then takes the Governor from Chuck and captures him, along with Sarah and Casey. Morgan and Devon are told by Beckman that they are the team's only chance of being saved.
54	19	"Chuck Versus the Ring: Part II"	Robert Duncan McNeill	Josh Schwartz & Chris Fedak	May 24, 2010	3X5819	5.16
After being saved by Morgan and Devon from Daniel Shaw, the team is out of harm's way and Chuck finally meets with Ellie to explain his spy life to her. They decide that after they have taken down The Ring, Chuck's spy life is done. The team learns from an imprisoned General Beckman that the Ring leaders, known as the Elders, are going to be at a special conference to take over the CIA and NSA. Team Bartowski is able to capture the Elders and expose Shaw. Chuck suffers a brain attack when flashing on Kung Fu, and wakes up in Castle, where he is being cared for by Sarah. Shaw escapes and comes to the Buy More and demands that Chuck face him. Meanwhile, Big Mike, along with Jeff and Lester, get in serious trouble when they get a call from a contact they have in Corporate informing them of the imminent closing down of the Burbank Buy More. While Shaw rigs the building with explosives and loses the detonator. Jeff triggers the emergency system in order to get everyone out of the store, after employees from Corporate enter, looking for Big Mike. They are furious and confused because all the merchandise in the Burbank Branch was meant to be transferred over to Beverly Hills. Chuck and Shaw finally confront each other, and after they each have a Kung Fu flash, a battle of the intersects commences - Chuck wins. Morgan finds the explosives' detonator and accidentally drops it, which rigs the bombs and causes the store to explode. Chuck, Sarah, Morgan, Casey, Alex, Devon, and Ellie gather for a memorial service for the death of Stephen Bartowski.

== Reception ==
=== US Nielsen ratings ===
Episode #	Episode	Date	Viewers (millions)	18–49 rating	18–49 share
1	"Chuck Versus the Pink Slip"	January 10, 2010	7.7	3.0	7
2	"Chuck Versus the Three Words"	January 10, 2010	7.2	2.9	7
3	"Chuck Versus the Angel de la Muerte"	January 11, 2010	7.4	2.6	7
4	"Chuck Versus Operation Awesome"	January 18, 2010	6.7	2.5	6
5	"Chuck Versus First Class"	January 25, 2010	7.0	2.5	6
6	"Chuck Versus the Nacho Sampler"	February 1, 2010	6.7	2.4	6
7	"Chuck Versus the Mask"	February 8, 2010	6.6	2.2	6
8	"Chuck Versus the Fake Name"	March 1, 2010	6.7	2.4	6
9	"Chuck Versus the Beard"	March 8, 2010	6.6	2.3	6
10	"Chuck Versus the Tic Tac"	March 15, 2010	5.8	1.9	6
11	"Chuck Versus the Final Exam"	March 22, 2010	5.4	1.9	5
12	"Chuck Versus the American Hero"	March 29, 2010	5.6	2.1	6
13	"Chuck Versus the Other Guy"	April 5, 2010	5.8	2.1	6
14	"Chuck Versus the Honeymooners"	April 26, 2010	6.0	2.1	6
15	"Chuck Versus the Role Models"	May 3, 2010	5.3	1.9	6
16	"Chuck Versus the Tooth"	May 10, 2010			
17	"Chuck Versus the Living Dead"	May 17, 2010			
18	"Chuck Versus the Subway"	May 24, 2010	4.9	1.7	5
19	"Chuck Versus the Ring: Part II"	May 24, 2010	5.1	1.8	5

=== UK BARB ratings ===
#	Episode	UK air date	Virgin1 viewers (thousand)	Virgin1 rank (weekly)	Virgin1+1 viewers (thousand)	Virgin1+1 rank (weekly)
1	"Chuck Versus the Pink Slip"	May 31, 2010	281	1	102	1
2	"Chuck Versus the Three Words"	June 7, 2010	312	1	44	9
3	"Chuck Versus the Angel de la Muerte"	June 14, 2010	272	2	—N/a	—N/a
4	"Chuck Versus Operation Awesome"	June 21, 2010	263	4	49	5
5	"Chuck Versus First Class"	June 28, 2010	315	1	74	1
6	"Chuck Versus the Nacho Sampler"	July 5, 2010	337	1	39	6
7	"Chuck Versus the Mask"	July 12, 2010	284	1	38	5
8	"Chuck Versus the Fake Name"	July 19, 2010	278	2	51	10
9	"Chuck Versus the Beard"	July 26, 2010	327	1	—N/a	—N/a
10	"Chuck Versus the Tic Tac"	August 2, 2010	293	2	—N/a	—N/a
11	"Chuck Versus the Final Exam"	August 9, 2010	289	1	—N/a	—N/a
12	"Chuck Versus the American Hero"	August 16, 2010	262	3	—N/a	—N/a
13	"Chuck Versus the Other Guy"	August 23, 2010	276	1	54	5
14	"Chuck Versus the Honeymooners"	August 30, 2010	232	4	48	8
15	"Chuck Versus the Role Models"	September 6, 2010	245	5	—N/a	—N/a
16	"Chuck Versus the Tooth"	September 13, 2010	272	3	55	2
17	"Chuck Versus the Living Dead"	September 20, 2010	207	9	56	5
18	"Chuck Versus the Subway"	September 27, 2010	209	6	—N/a	—N/a
19	"Chuck Versus the Ring: Part II"	October 4, 2010	337	1	52	4

== Home media release ==
Chuck: The Complete Third Season
Set Details			Special Features
19 Episodes; 5-Disc Set; English; Subtitles: English, Spanish, French			Declassified Scenes; Chuck-Fu...and Dim Sum: Becoming a Spy Guy; The Jeffster Reunion: The Definitive Mockumentary; Gag Reel
Release Dates
United States; Canada	United Kingdom	Australia; New Zealand	Japan
September 7, 2010 (DVD and Blu-ray)	October 11, 2010	TBA	March 2, 2011
