= Sarah Walker (Chuck) =

Sarah Bartowski
- Chuck character
- Yvonne Strahovski as Sarah Bartowski
- First appearance: "Chuck Versus the Intersect"
- Last appearance: "Chuck Versus the Goodbye"
- Portrayed by: Yvonne Strahovski; Stefanie Scott (young); Alexa Blair (young)

In-universe information
- Aliases: Sam Lisa (real name; surname unknown); Sarah Walker; Jenny Burton
- Title: Agent
- Occupation: Former CIA Agent; Co-Owner of Burbank Buy More
- Family: Dr. Ellie Bartowski-Woodcomb (sister-in-law); Clara Woodcomb (niece); Jack Burton (father's alias); Emma (mother); Molly (adopted sister); Stephen J. Bartowski (father-in-law, deceased); Mary Elizabeth Bartowski (mother-in-law); Unnamed grandmother
- Spouse: Charles Irving "Chuck" Bartowski
- Born: May 1982
- Affiliation: Central Intelligence Agency; Operation Bartowski; Carmichael Industries
- Partners: Chuck Bartowski (partner); John Casey (partner-employee); Morgan Grimes (partner-employee); Brigadier General Diane Beckman (former commanding officer)
- Expertise: Trained in espionage, hand-to-hand combat, and firearms. Exceptional con artist (trained by her father prior to being enlisted in CIA). Highly skilled with throwing knives and various bladed weapons. Trained pilot. Downloads the intersect late in the series which makes her even more superhuman despite her already expert skillset.

Sarah Lisa Bartowski (née Walker) is the alias of one of the main characters of the television show Chuck on NBC. She is portrayed by Yvonne Strahovski and is one of two agents assigned by the NSA and CIA to protect Chuck Bartowski after he unwittingly downloads the secret government computer known as the Intersect into his brain. Throughout the series, she is Chuck's primary love interest and initially poses as Chuck's girlfriend to conceal their identities as spies from the public. In the Season 4 finale, "Chuck Versus the Cliffhanger", Chuck and Sarah were married, dismissed from government service, and given ownership of Volkoff Industries, with which they bought the Burbank Buy More and the secret Castle base thereunder. During the final three episodes of season 5, Sarah gets her memories suppressed due to a faulty Intersect upload, the signs of recovery from which are exhibited throughout the final episode. At an episode later in the series her real first name is known to be Sam, and a while later her real middle name is said to be Lisa.

== Biography ==
Very little about Sarah's past is revealed throughout the series. According to one dossier, she was born in May 1982, though Chuck stated she was 28 years old before he met her father for the first time in a 2008 episode. The only people outside of her family confirmed to know her real name, "Sam", were Director Graham, Daniel Shaw, and Chuck; she confessed her middle name is Lisa.

The relationship between her parents began to fall apart after her father's disastrous proposal, and Sarah and her father were largely on their own at least as early as 1988. Her father was a con artist she introduced to Chuck as "Jack Burton," and much of her youth was spent moving from city to city under a series of aliases, actively participating in her father's schemes.

Sarah spent at least some of the ten years between 1988 and 1998 in the care of her grandmother, who did not think much of her father. Sarah attended at least her senior year of high school—and graduated in 1998—under the alias of Jennifer Burton or "Jenny Burton". Sometime in 1998 before her graduation, Sarah's father was arrested for his own protection after a scam went wrong. He left her a hidden cache of money for just such an emergency, and it was while recovering this cache that she was first approached by CIA Director Graham. He took her in as a protege after remarking on her many aliases and gave her the cover name of Sarah Walker. Although apparently "recruited" at this point, flashbacks make it clear that she continued in high school; several of the popular children cruelly mocked her as the "jailbird's daughter" because of her father's imprisonment.

Sarah was (officially) recruited out of Harvard University. She also spent a year with the Secret Service.

Sarah's earliest known assignment after being recruited was with the C.A.T. (Clandestine Attack Team) Squad, a team of female spies that also included Sarah's DEA friend, Carina Miller. The team eventually broke up in 2003, when Sarah discovered a bug indicating one of the members, Zondra, was a traitor. Although Zondra was cleared by a government inquiry, their relationship was strained.

Sarah's CIA "red test," or first kill, was Evelyn Shaw in 2005. Sarah was given no background information about her target, and couldn't check on the kill because she had to flee from the scene before police arrived.

Also beginning in 2005 Sarah was partnered with Chuck's former friend and college roommate Bryce Larkin. Their professional relationship eventually evolved into an intimate one.

After Bryce went rogue, Sarah was assigned to Budapest under the handling of Kieran Ryker. In 2006 Ryker assigned Sarah to retrieve a "package" that turned out to be a baby girl, but Sarah discovered Ryker was corrupt and left the baby with her mother, who was unknown to the CIA. Sarah cut off all contact in order to protect them and to make sure the baby grew up having the normal life Sarah never got. Afterward, Director Graham sent Sarah to Burbank to investigate why Larkin sent an email to Chuck Bartowski.

In 2011, when Ryker resurfaced and found out that Sarah's mother had the child, now called Molly, Sarah saved them from him and was reunited with her mother and adopted sister.

== Series ==
=== Season 1 ===
When Bryce apparently goes rogue to steal the Intersect computer, Sarah—not realizing that he did so to protect it from a cabal of rogue spies called Fulcrum—feels both personally and professionally betrayed. Sarah is subsequently assigned by Graham to attempt to recover the Intersect. The only lead is the e-mail Bryce sent to Chuck, and she tracks Chuck down to the Buy More where, posing as a customer with a broken phone, she first makes contact.

Sarah soon becomes one of Chuck Bartowski's two government handlers. She is partnered with NSA agent John Casey and assigned the task of protecting Chuck. This extends to acting on information Chuck "flashes" on.

As part of her cover, Sarah pretends to be Chuck's girlfriend. One of the complications and the main focus on the development of her character throughout the series is that although initially she insists this is only part of her cover, a genuine romantic interest grows between them. While Sarah herself is initially slow to recognize or acknowledge her feelings, other characters have readily picked up on her attraction to Chuck. Sarah's DEA friend Carina is one of the first to recognize that Sarah's feelings for Chuck are more than merely professional. Casey also recognizes that she is falling for him, something he teases her and Chuck about frequently.

The development of a relationship between Sarah and Chuck meets with two major sets of obstacles throughout the series. First, professionally Sarah is supposed to avoid romantic entanglements, and her affection for Chuck sometimes does put him in danger. Second, both characters become jealous of competing romantic interests, including instances where one of them has to seduce someone for a mission.

There are two particularly notable cases of these love triangles in the first season. Chuck's interest in finding a real relationship leads Chuck to "break up" his cover relationship with Sarah and pursue Lou the sandwich girl, which causes Sarah to become jealous and protective. Just after the "break up" Sarah passionately kisses Chuck seconds before a bomb is meant to explode. Soon afterwards, Bryce Larkin returns and competes for Sarah's affections. Sarah is torn but ultimately decides to stick with her mission protecting Chuck rather than follow Bryce, largely due to her feelings for Chuck.

By the end of the season, Sarah displays a willingness to go to great lengths for Chuck, and is even prepared to go rogue and draw her gun on another CIA agent attempting to take him into government custody.

=== Season 2 ===
In the second season, Chuck and Sarah haltingly move towards establishing a real relationship. Sarah agrees to go on a first "real" date with Chuck as it appears he is being released back to civilian life. However, the rebuilt Intersect is sabotaged, pulling Chuck back into his spy life and re-establishing Sarah's professional barrier.

Then, as Chuck attempts to pursue Sarah anyway, Larkin returns a second time. This time Sarah's feelings are clearly for Chuck, but when her affection for Chuck places both her life and Chuck's at risk, Bryce convinces Chuck to "break up" with her.

Shortly thereafter, Chuck runs into his ex-girlfriend Jill Roberts, creating another love triangle that makes Sarah jealous and protective of Chuck. But this time she shows more restraint, trying not to interfere, at least until she discovers Jill is a member of Fulcrum. Yet another love triangle arises later in the season with the arrival of Cole Barker, who (like Bryce) is a suave and formidable spy, but that only goes as far as a kiss.

Chuck provides Sarah with emotional support when a mission forces her to revisit part of her childhood, and later when Sarah's father returns. Chuck makes some strong suggestions that he loves Sarah, including notably in the mid-season finale when he gives Sarah his mother's charm bracelet, a gift Sarah says is something he should save for a "real girlfriend."

Sarah's personal feelings for Chuck lead to her temporary replacement as Chuck's handler in "Chuck Versus the Broken Heart", as Beckman is concerned those feelings jeopardized the mission. However, the replacement agent, Forrest (Tricia Helfer), failed to effectively protect Chuck and he refused to work with her because of her methods. Sarah's feelings also gave her a close insight that warned her something was wrong when Forrest couldn't. Beckman reluctantly acknowledged Sarah and Chuck's feelings for each other were actually a benefit to their working relationship rather than a danger and allowed Sarah to resume her role as his handler.

In the meantime, while Sarah's professional obligations to Chuck are suspended, she becomes more personally involved. Sarah makes an unauthorized and illegal search of the CIA database at Langley to locate Chuck's father after his own efforts fail, and ultimately she takes Chuck to meet his father.

In "Chuck Versus the First Kill" General Beckman orders Sarah to lure Chuck to Castle so he can be taken into custody and brought back to Washington. Sarah objects, but is about to carry out her orders when at the last minute she warns Chuck that it is a setup and takes him on the run.

While on the run, Chuck and Sarah spend the night in a motel and share a bed. While not under surveillance, they kiss and are close to having sex but are interrupted by a lack of a condom, followed by the appearance of Agent Casey. After Chuck successfully removes the Intersect from his head, Sarah is reassigned to work on the new Intersect project with Bryce, but soon decides not to go and instead stay with Chuck. But even after learning that she turned down the assignment, Chuck consciously re-establishes the professional barrier by uploading the new Intersect.

=== Season 3 ===
By the beginning of "Chuck Versus the Pink Slip" Sarah's relationship with Chuck is shattered. Flashbacks throughout the episode reveal that shortly after uploading the new Intersect, Sarah asked Chuck to go AWOL and run away with her so they could be together. Chuck was initially enthusiastic, but by the time they met with each other, he refused so he could pursue his spy training. Sarah was heartbroken and subsequently cut him off. She was forced to reconnect again when Chuck interfered with an operation against the Ring. Ultimately, Chuck was reinstated on the team and Sarah was ordered by Beckman to help train Chuck. Their relationship issues again came to a head during an assignment with Carina. Because of Chuck's remaining feelings for her, she requested a transfer from Beckman on grounds that she was a liability but was denied. They managed to partially resolve their situation, and Carina showed Sarah security footage of Chuck trying to explain to her that he chose to take his spy training because of Sarah's own encouragement, and his realization that he could help people and a desire to protect those he loved-including her.

Team Bartowski's new leader, Daniel Shaw, began romantically approaching Sarah in "Chuck Versus the Mask." Although initially Sarah very vocally rejected his advances, when she and Shaw were exposed to cyclosarin gas Sarah admitted that she overreacted and somewhat enjoyed Shaw's attention. Sarah and Chuck agreed that they were free to pursue relationships with other people, and Sarah began allowing Shaw to get closer. In "Chuck Versus the Fake Name", Sarah tells Shaw that this job is making her slowly forget who she was before and says that for the last three years, she has never once told anybody her real name. When Shaw asks her what it is, Sarah reveals that her real name is Sam (most likely from Samantha). Chuck also finds out her real name after he overhears this conversation while posing as an assassin the Ring hired to kill Shaw. She is still initially reluctant to allow herself to become involved with him, but by the end of the episode relents.

Sarah administered Chuck's "final exam" as a spy alongside Shaw in "Chuck Versus the Final Exam." During the mission, Chuck tried to talk about what happened in Prague, but the mission interrupted them. Although pleased with Chuck's successful handling of the assignment, Sarah was greatly disturbed when Shaw instructed her to order him to kill a rogue CIA agent. She attempted to resist, fearing what it would make Chuck into, but eventually gave Chuck his instructions. When Chuck finally cornered his target he hesitated and Casey completed the hit from the shadows, however from Sarah's perspective it looked like Chuck pulled the trigger. After the mission, she refused to answer when he attempted to call and expressed to Shaw her distaste over what she had turned Chuck into. When Shaw pressed if she was still in love with Chuck, she replied she no longer was.

In "Chuck Versus the American Hero" Chuck presses her on how he feels and asks for a second chance at Prague. Sarah is in the process of packing to meet him when Casey arrives. Although she insists what he has to tell her won't change her decision, Casey admits he killed the mole instead, to Sarah's visible relief thus removing any reservations that Sarah had against Chuck. However, before she can leave, Shaw arrives and tells her they have a new mission and there is no time to contact Chuck. In Shaw's car, Sarah is distressed that there is no signal to call Chuck and asks where they are headed. Shaw tells her only they are going to "settle an old score."

"Chuck Versus the Other Guy" revealed that Sarah was taken by Shaw to a Ring facility, where masquerading that they were still on a mission, he revealed to Sarah that she was set up to kill Evelyn. Despite the revelation, Sarah continued to trust Shaw over Chuck's misgivings. She and Chuck did reconcile their feelings for each other, as she admits she fell for him before the climax of the Season 1 pilot. As they were preparing to begin a relationship, Shaw lured her to Paris and took her to the street where Evelyn was killed, revealing that he had turned to the Ring and intended to kill Sarah in retaliation for his wife's death. With the help of Morgan Grimes, Chuck correctly guessed Grimes Shaw's intent and destination and arrived in time to save Sarah's life by shooting Shaw when he refused to back down. Unlike the death of Perry, Chuck's killing of Shaw to save her life (and his handling of the situation as a whole) put Sarah's mind at ease, realizing that although Chuck is capable of killing someone, he won't resort to that until every other option has been exhausted. The two chose to spend a few days together in Paris before returning to Burbank.

She and Chuck did attempt to run away from the spy life together in "Chuck Versus the Honeymooners" until an encounter with a defecting Basque terrorist helped them realize that they "wanted it all," and were determined to build their relationship without giving up on their careers. Although Beckman was not pleased when she learned of the couple, even she noted: "It's about damn time."

In "Chuck Versus the Role Models", Chuck asks her to move in but she initially declines, telling him that they aren't a "normal couple" so they shouldn't pretend to have a "normal life." General Beckman assigns them to observe an experienced spy couple, the Turners. After seeing the Turners' rocky relationship, Chuck and Sarah find that their relationship could be more of a challenge than they thought. However, Sarah agrees to move in with Chuck at the end of the episode, so that they can have something "to fall back on after [their] spy life is over."

In "Chuck Versus the Tooth" even though they are living together, Sarah still has difficulty expressing her emotions to Chuck. When Chuck starts to show signs of a mental breakdown and is locked down in a CIA mental hospital, Sarah believes in and supports his claims that a Zamibian scientist has connections to the Ring. Although her investigation indicates that Chuck is wrong, she goes to his doctor and tells him that she loves Chuck and wants to help him work through whatever problems he is facing. At the end of the episode, she candidly tells Chuck that she loves him.

Sarah struggles with Chuck lying to her in "Chuck Versus the Living Dead" about his dream that Shaw is alive. After she obtains the truth from Morgan, she confronts Chuck and along with Casey, goes through her relationship with Shaw to find any clues as to his whereabouts or plans. She breaks into Shaw's penthouse with Chuck and recovers Shaw's Intelligence Safe after a confrontation with a Ring agent. When Chuck's father leaves, she provides Chuck with his address and takes him to Stephen's cabin, where she saves Chuck from a trap by Ring agents. At the end of the episode, Sarah gives her spy will to Chuck, saying that he's the only one she wants to have it in case something happens to her.

In "Chuck Versus the Subway", Sarah, along with Casey and Chuck, is arrested by Shaw under charges of treason after Shaw puts in motion his plan to take over the CIA. While supposedly transporting them to a detention facility, Shaw stops the truck and tells them to uncuff themselves, planning on killing them and making it look as if they were trying to escape, at which point Morgan and Devon use Casey's highly modified Crown Victoria to blow up the truck, rescuing Team Bartowski.

In "Chuck Versus the Ring: Part II", Sarah and Team Bartowski carry out a plan to expose Shaw at a security convention. The plan succeeds and they're able to identify and detain the Ring Elders, but Shaw manages to escape just as Sarah walks into his office to find Chuck heavily debilitated by his latest attempt at flashing without the Governor. Sarah takes a barely conscious Chuck back to Castle when Shaw enters the Buy More and plants several bombs, threatening to blow up the store unless Chuck meets him. Sarah leaves Chuck in Castle and meets Shaw alone just as Jeff, Lester and Big Mike pull the fire alarm, emptying out the store, although Shaw is able to prevent Sarah from escaping. Chuck sees through the monitors in Castle that Shaw is holding Sarah hostage at the Buy More and manages to get up and meet him. After their confrontation, Chuck decides not to kill Shaw and Sarah knocks him unconscious, taking the Governor from him and returning it to Chuck. She later accepts Chuck's decision to follow through on his promise to Ellie and quit the CIA.

=== Season 4 ===
At the beginning of the fourth season, Sarah continues working for the CIA partnered with Casey, while Chuck is retired. "Chuck Versus the Anniversary" reveals that the two have been assigned to investigate Volkoff Industries, run by a notorious black-market arms dealer. Their mission dovetails with Chuck's own search for his mother, which she and Casey agree to aid. Most of Sarah's actions for the remainder of the season revolve around this combined mission and around the personal challenges from her past that she confronts as she and Chuck decide to commit to marriage.

Sarah confronts her old high school enemy Heather Chandler again in "Chuck Versus the Cubic Z." Heather admits that she tried the route that Sarah is currently traveling (with Chuck being her personal moral beacon), but her nature overwhelmed any inclination at a normal life; she further doubts that Sarah will be any different. Under fire, Sarah denies being anything like Heather; the two come to an understanding and as a peace offering, Heather surrenders what she knows about Project Beacon and Frost (Chuck's mother).

In Chuck Versus Phase Three, after Chuck is captured, Sarah goes on a rogue mission to find him, during the course of which Casey describes her actions as those of Langston Graham's "wild card enforcer," a side of her he didn't like. Sarah ultimately agrees with Casey's statement and says "I'm different without Chuck, and I don't like it." When she finally finds him, Sarah resolves her expressed fear of marriage in multiple previous episodes by telling an unconscious Chuck that she loves him and wants to spend the rest of her life with him, with or without the Intersect.

Sarah tells Beckman in "Chuck Versus the Balcony" that if there is anything she can do to bring back Chuck's mother to let her do so. Just as Chuck is about to propose to her, she is pulled away to establish her cover as a rogue CIA agent and goes undercover in Volkoff Industries to help Mary bring it down. After Alexei Volkoff is defeated, Chuck finally proposes to Sarah while waiting for the arrival of Clara Woodcomb.

The pending wedding with Chuck presents Sarah with a number of personal hurdles owing to her childhood. In "Chuck Versus the Seduction Impossible" Chuck's family starts prying the couple with questions about their wedding plans causing Sarah to panic. She suggests eloping, as she would have no one to invite to the large family wedding Chuck desired. To help her reconnect with her friends, Chuck reunites Sarah with her old team, in "Chuck Versus the Cat Squad", prompting the return of their nemesis Augusto Gaez and some internal grudges. Sarah had long suspected her teammate Zondra of being a traitor working with Gaez, having found a transmitter in her boot. When it was discovered that Amy was, in fact, the traitor, Sarah mended her friendship with Zondra, inviting her and Carina to be her bridesmaids. Sarah also deepens friendship with Ellie, agreeing to discuss her family issues, and inviting her to be maid of honor.

In "Chuck Versus the First Bank of Evil", Sarah is at first not truly excited about making wedding plans but Ellie explains that a portion will cause her to make the situation more real, alluding to her own factor in her and Devon's wedding: their wedding rings. Sarah is doubtful, but when she tries to find the right dress, Ellie's prediction is justified. At the end of the episode, Sarah has become a Bridezilla, horrifying both Ellie and Chuck.

Sarah reconnects with her father, "Jack Burton," in "Chuck Versus the Wedding Planner" when the wedding planner she hires with Chuck steals their savings. She fails to conceal her upcoming wedding from him, and ultimately Jack and Sarah have a father/daughter dance at the reception. Jack laments it might be the only one they have. Chuck invites Jack to stick around but he says he won't make promises to Sarah he can't keep. Instead, Jack leaves Sarah her old piggy bank to which he has only added cash, never taken, to cover the costs of their wedding.

In "Chuck Versus the Last Details", Vivian discovers that Chuck's mother and father were responsible for the undoing of her own father, Alexi Volkoff/Hartley Winterbottom. She takes her revenge by targeting Sarah with the Norseman device. Sarah is barely clinging to life throughout most of "Chuck Versus the Cliffhanger", but is saved when Chuck and Hartley retrieve the antidote for the Norseman from Vivian. She and Chuck are then finally married. When they return from their honeymoon two weeks later she and Chuck reveal to Casey and Morgan that Hartley turned over all the wealth of Volkoff Industries to them. She and Chuck used this money to purchase the Buy More and Castle and announce they intend to go into business for themselves as independent spies.

=== Season 5 ===
Sarah's devotion to the spy life wanes, subtly at first, but much more pronounced in later episodes. Her decisions become more geared towards using her emotions and believing in her friends rather than relying on distrust, suspicion, and self-sufficiency. The start of this mindset began most notably in "Chuck Versus the Frosted Tips", when she believed (correctly) that Morgan's drastic change in attitude was due more to a malfunctioning Intersect than a power trip, even when Chuck believed that Morgan was simply acting like an overconfident ass.

She further displays a dislike for her spy life when she asks Chuck not to get reintegrated with the CIA. This dislike proceeds further as she suggests that Carmichael Industries become an Electronic Security Company, focusing on Chuck's primary strength with computers, and minimizing the amount of gunplay they would be subjected to in "Chuck Versus Bo". However, Nicholas Quinn's emergence and the reintroduction of the Intersect glasses lead to the team having a "last mission", which was successful, though Quinn kidnaps Chuck in exchange for the glasses. Sarah and Casey go to save him but are ambushed by Quinn's men and heavily outnumbered. Sarah, after running out of ammunition, puts on the glasses and uploads the Intersect into her head, which allows her to save both her and Casey after she flashes on how to neutralize Quinn's men and go to rescue Chuck, but Sarah begins to suffer uncontrollable flashes shortly after.

She's kidnapped by Quinn after he realizes that she has the Intersect and forces her to flash on Intersect images, wiping her memories, including those of her relationship with Chuck. He then manipulates Sarah into believing that he's her CIA handler and that she has orders to bring him the Intersect glasses and kill Chuck. Sarah is able to get the glasses, but Chuck had managed to switch them. Sarah then takes Ellie hostage as leverage against Chuck and Chuck agrees to give her to the glasses and Sarah threatens to kill Ellie if she senses that it's a trap. As they drive to where Chuck hid the glasses, Ellie notices that Sarah isn't wearing her seatbelt and tells her that if she had her memories back, she would want her to do whatever needed to protect Chuck and then crashes her car, which knocks Sarah out. Chuck then tells Ellie that he knows where to take Sarah to help her get her memories back. Sarah awakens in the house she and Chuck had planned to buy and Chuck tells her that he brought her there hoping that she'd remember the house, if not him. Sarah tells him that their relationship was nothing more than a cover and he was just an assignment. Chuck tells her that he was an assignment, but then that she fell in love with him. With tears in his eyes, he tells her about their first real, non-cover kiss was when they thought they were going to die from a bomb and how he closed his eyes and felt her grab him and then kiss him and how they tried to pretend it never happened and how one day he was so sure that she could never love a nerd like him, she came over and he asked if she loved him and that she said yes. Chuck then tells her that when he proposed, they knew they would be together for the rest of their lives, living in this house and raising a family.

Chuck then tells Sarah that he's going to give her a choice: they can start over or she can take the glasses and never see him again. Sarah then asks if Chuck really loves her to which he replies "With all of my heart." Sarah then tells Chuck she's sorry for doing her job too well and that she's going to finish the mission. As she tries to grab the glasses, Chuck grabs them away for her and they get into a scuffle, with Chuck refusing to fight back. She then kicks him down the steps and takes the glasses and then points her gun at his head. Chuck tells her that she can kill him, but that he'll never hurt her. Sarah then notices the carving of their names and remembers writing it. At that moment, Quinn arrives and takes the glasses and tells Sarah that Chuck was right about him and pulls out a gun to shoot her with. Chuck then jumps in front of the bullet and is shot in the back. Sarah tries to shoot Quinn, but he escapes. She then kneels down next to Chuck to see if he's okay and he tells her that he's wearing a vest. Hearing the sirens, Chuck tells her that the CIA is coming for her and tells her to run and she flees.

Back at her place, Sarah is quickly packing her things when Casey walks through the door. She pulls a knife, but Casey tells her that he's not there to fight. He asks what she remembers about him to which Sarah replies his reputation: how he's unfriendly, unforgiving and unquestioning about orders. Casey chuckles and says that people said the same thing about her when they first met and says that it was probably the reason they never got along. Sarah asks if they didn't along, why he was here now and Casey pulls out an envelope out of his jacket and sets it down for her, saying that Chuck ended up making them both soft. He tells her that in the past five years, the two of them changed and they became friends. Casey tells Sarah to take care of herself and then leaves. Sarah then opens the envelope he left and pulls out a disc of mission logs. She watches them and it's of her telling how she's started to fall in love with Chuck and even one confirming the kiss Chuck had told her about.

Sarah then shows up at Chuck's apartment just as he's about to go inside. Sarah tells him that she believes everything he said about them, but that she doesn't feel it. Chuck asks her why she's there right now and Sarah tells him that she wanted to say she was sorry for everything that happened and that she wanted to say goodbye. She tells Chuck that she's going to go look for Quinn. The two of them say goodbye and then Sarah leaves.

Sarah then started pursuing Quinn, learning that he's trying to reassemble The Key, a device that can modify the Intersect's original function. When she fails to stop him on a plane, she returns to Chuck to ask for his help. They track Quinn to Berlin, where by coincidence, she started re-enacting the events from the pilot. However, she made the mistake of assuming that Chuck would kill Quinn, who not only allowed Quinn to escape but accidentally shot down Casey's helicopter in the process. Locked back in Castle, Sarah was convinced to work with the team as they tried to stop Quinn. Sarah is forced to shoot Quinn when he reaches for his gun, ruining their chances of deactivating the bomb Beckman is sitting on. Chuck then decides that he must upload the Intersect back into his head in order to figure out how to defuse the bomb, thus eliminating the only chance of Sarah getting her memories back. He gets the Intersect, but cannot figure out to disarm the bomb once he's on the computer for it. Sarah suggests searching for "Irene Demova" (a porn virus) on the Internet which Chuck does and is surprised that she knows about, pointing out it was from five years ago and the bomb is disarmed after the virus crashes it

Afterward, Sarah felt unsure of herself because her memories have still not fully returned and tells Chuck that she needs time alone to figure out who she is. Chuck later finds her on the beach, pointing out that it was the same beach they were at after their first "date" when Sarah told him to trust her and that he's doing the same thing now, asking her to trust him. He tells Sarah that no matter where she goes, he'll always be there for her. Sarah asks Chuck to tell her about their story, to which he does. When he has finished, Chuck suggests that they try Morgan's theory and have a "magical kiss" to see if her memories will return. Sarah tells Chuck to kiss her. They share a kiss, thus; ending the series. Whether it means that Sarah's memories will come back or she will have to fall in love with Chuck all over again remains unknown.

== Development ==
On February 12, 2007, Australian actress Yvonne Strahovski was announced for what was then the role of "Sarah Kent," joining Zachary Levi (Chuck) and Adam Baldwin (Maj. John Casey). Prior to the beginning of filming the character's name was changed to Sarah Walker. Strahovski was unable to come to the US for an audition so the producers allowed her to make her audition via the internet. The character is a reversal of typical action film gender roles, with Sarah Walker portraying the protector and fighter while Chuck is the more emotional "brain."

Strahovski herself is highly active and performs all her own fight scenes. She considers this one of her favorite parts of the role, especially the fight scene in "Chuck Versus the First Date" against Michael Clarke Duncan's towering Mr. Colt. She also speaks fluent Polish, which she worked into the role in the Season One episode "Chuck Versus the Wookiee."

Very little of Sarah's background is revealed in Season 1 other than her relationship with Bryce Larkin and middle name. However real attention was paid to her past in the first half of Season Two. In June 2008 Nicole Richie was announced to be appearing in a role as a former classmate of Sarah from high school, and in September Gary Cole was revealed to be playing Sarah's father in an upcoming episode. It has not been announced if the name Graham hints at on her birth certificate is actually her real name, or if it will ever be revealed.

At the 2009 San Diego Comic-Con, Josh Schwartz and Chris Fedak revealed that Sarah's mission would shift somewhat in Season 3. According to dialogue quoted during interviews, Sarah's role would begin to change from protecting Chuck from the world to protecting the world from Chuck due to the unpredictability of Intersect 2.0. Sarah would also have a significant effect on Chuck's development during the third season, due to the profound impact she has on his emotional state. As described by Fedak, with the Intersect being affected by Chuck's emotions, Sarah has the potential to be both his "kryptonite" and his "spinach." Other interviews and panels have indicated Sarah's role with Chuck would also change from more of an asset/handler relationship, to becoming Chuck's "sensei."

=== Personality ===
At the beginning of the series, Sarah's complicated upbringing and government training have made her deadly, determined and guarded.

- Her childhood experience in conning and concealing secrets has been sharpened by spy training; she is highly capable at combat, especially with throwing knives (she typically wears several in a sheath strapped to her leg when her wardrobe allows,) and to a lesser extent her favored side arm throughout the series, the Smith & Wesson Model 5906; she is able to speak in several foreign languages (Polish, Russian, Spanish and German, and can understand at least some Swedish) and accents.
- Before she meets Chuck she is apparently, in Casey's words, "Langston Graham's wild-card enforcer," and in her own words in "Chuck Versus the Tooth", does not envision a future for herself beyond her next mission. She is determined to personally resolve Bryce's perceived personal and professional betrayal.
- And finally, her professional need to keep her past and emotions a closely guarded secret also suits her temperamentally. She does not readily discuss her personal history or reveal her real name, and repeatedly states the conventional wisdom of the spy community that emotion and love create vulnerabilities. It is later revealed that a key event in her becoming cold and distant was the day of her "red test," or first kill, which she considers to be the worst day of her life and the details of which she never forgot; and one of her greatest stated fears is Chuck becoming like her when he is ordered to undergo his own red test.

Still, she is immediately receptive to Chuck's good nature and humor, and she much later admits to Chuck that she fell for him during the first episode "after you fixed my phone and before you started defusing bombs with computer viruses." While Sarah lacks Chuck's openly trusting nature, she quickly recognizes that Chuck is just a regular guy and not a threat, and chooses to protect him from the NSA team led by John Casey. A series-long character arc involves her gradually overcoming both professional barriers and deep-rooted relationship baggage from her past to let her guard down and develop a relationship with Chuck.

The first two seasons show her to be much more empathetic and sympathetic to Chuck's plight than Casey, and is highly protective of Chuck, to an extent beyond the requirements of her mission to safeguard the Intersect. Where Casey for a long time only seems concerned with physical threats to Chuck's safety (things that might cost the government the use of the Intersect information in Chuck's head), Sarah is more concerned for him as an individual:

- Sarah is quick to reassure Chuck of his own abilities beyond the Intersect, and tells him on several occasions that he has made an excellent spy.
- Sarah openly warned both Lou and Jill—with whom Chuck carried on brief relationships—not to hurt him.
- By the end of the first season, she is prepared to pull a gun on a fellow CIA agent rather than allow Chuck to be detained for the rest of his life. Later, in "Chuck Versus Santa Claus", she executes an unarmed Fulcrum agent, since his special status makes him confident that Fulcrum will find him and that he would then reveal to them that Chuck is the Intersect, and thereafter Chuck's life would be over.
- Early on, she objects to orders that put Chuck and those close to him in danger; she also increasingly objects to lying or concealing information from Chuck and using him without his knowledge. Chuck and Sarah have always had a saying 'Don't freak out'.

Though she kisses Chuck when they think they're about to die, and they go on a real date when they think Chuck is about to regain his freedom, Sarah keeps Chuck uncertain about her feelings for him with mixed messages: obvious concern for Chuck, the ambiguous nature of their "cover relationship," noting professional barriers to any real relationship but also occasionally holding out the possibility of eventually having a normal life with her, and her aptitude for taking on different roles/covers and using her appearance on missions, at times flirting with the team's targets when needed. Further complicating things on both sides are the occasional love triangles.

Despite her attempts to mask her feelings, many characters in the first two seasons, including Chuck's sister Ellie, Bryce Larkin, Casey, Carina, Roan Montgomery, and her father, all detect that she is romantically interested in or in love with Chuck. Though she denies any such interest, she openly acknowledges a desire to remain friendly with Chuck on a personal level, until the end of the second season, when she and Chuck share several intimate moments.

At this time, as Chuck becomes more capable in combat and embraces becoming a spy, she becomes more concerned about how this will change his character, and that if he has to kill he will lose the trusting and good nature she originally came to love about him, just as she thinks her own "red test" changed her.

In "Chuck Versus the Ring: Part II", Shaw remarks on how Sarah's personality has transformed from a person who masked her emotions to being just as open, caring and loving as Chuck. She does express relief when Chuck does not kill Shaw after defeating him and shows mercy. While Shaw said that it made him weak, Sarah tells Chuck, "No, that is what makes you great!"

Several episodes imply that Sarah misses or envies the "normal" life Chuck desires to return to. Sarah herself expressed a desire to have a normal life with Chuck in "Chuck Versus the Pink Slip," and has asked Carina and Casey if they ever wondered what a normal, real life would be like. In "Chuck Versus the Role Models", Sarah moved in with Chuck and expressed that she looked forward to living a "normal life" with him after their spy lives are over.

But in keeping with her temperament, Sarah is often unnerved in situations of a more domestic nature. She is visibly flustered as Ellie's maid of honor, and in a deleted scene from "Chuck Versus the Ring," is panicking, stating that she handled covert operations and none of it was as terrifying as Ellie on her wedding day. When Devon suggests that Chuck and Sarah would be next in line for the family life, Sarah becomes scared; she later channels her frustration and fear by pummelling Casey in a sparring match, and becomes instantly relieved when a romantic mission is cancelled. After Clara's birth and Chuck's proposal when Chuck's family begin to plan Chuck and Sarah's wedding, Chuck, Casey and Sarah become visibly scared at the family's intensity; Sarah remarks that she's "sweating. The last time [she] sweat, gunfire was involved."

Throughout the rest of Season 4, Sarah becomes more accepting of the concept of marriage and normalcy and ultimately Chuck and Sarah are married by the end of Season 4.

Season 5 has Sarah become more interested in having a normal life, to the point of admitting she was excited about the possibility of having a baby, which prompts her to start questioning the constant risks she and Chuck put themselves through in their line of work. Her change from a cold-blooded spy to a warm and loving person culminates with her reconnecting with her mother, to Chuck's excitement. But unfortunately in the shows final episodes Sarah loses her entire memory of the past 5 years of being with Chuck. She does not remember Chuck or anyone else. But she did remember the Wienerlicious from the first season as well as the Irene Demova virus from the shows pilot hinting that her memories are not completely gone. In the shows final scene Chuck and Sarah exchange a "magical kiss" but it ends with uncertainty as to whether or not Sarah remembers.

== Reception ==
She was included in TV Guide's list of "TV's Sexiest Crime Fighters".
