= Stephen J. Bartowski =

Fictional character in the television series Chuck

- Chuck character
- Scott Bakula as Stephen J. Bartowski
- First appearance: "Chuck Versus the Predator" (as Orion) "Chuck Versus the Dream Job" (as Stephen)
- Last appearance: "Chuck Versus the First Fight" (voice only)
- Portrayed by: Scott Bakula

In-universe information
- Alias: Orion (codename)
- Gender: Male
- Occupation: Independent
- Family: Dr. Devon Christian Woodcomb (son-in-law); Sarah Bartowski (daughter-in-law); Clara Woodcomb (granddaughter); Jesse Gunter (father-in-law); Mary Gunter (mother-in-law)
- Spouse: Mary Elizabeth Bartowski (widow)
- Children: Dr. Eleanor Fay "Ellie" Woodcomb (daughter); Charles Irving Bartowski (son)
- Expertise: Computer expert and inventor, engineer, some hand-to-hand combat training; foremost expert on the Intersect; Espionage Master (no governmental affiliation, freelance or self-employed); high-level classified knowledge made available through "flashes"

Stephen Joseph Bartowski is a recurring character on the television series Chuck portrayed by actor Scott Bakula. Stephen is the estranged father of Chuck and Ellie Bartowski, and under the government codename "Orion" was the chief designer of the Intersect.

== Biography ==
Few details about Stephen Bartowski's life have been revealed on the show. His wife, Mary Elizabeth Bartowski, left him under unknown circumstances when Chuck was in the fifth grade and although he loved his children, Chuck describes him in "Chuck Versus the Sizzling Shrimp" as "never really there." Stephen is a computer and software genius who attended graduate school with Ted Roark, whom Bartowski would later allege stole all of his best ideas. Sometime after the end of his association with Roark, he went to work for the government. He worked with Dr. Jonas Zarnow and Howard Busgang on the Intersect computer database, where he was the head of the project under the codename "Orion." Stephen would tell Chuck in "Chuck Versus the Dream Job," regarding the Intersect, he designed "just the really cool parts." He would later reveal to Chuck that he tested the Intersect on himself, and thus possesses an older version of it himself.

Stephen left his children eighteen years before the events of "Chuck Versus the Dream Job" after promising to make his children pancakes for dinner. This number seems to vary: in the second season, Chuck says that their father abandoned them ten years ago, but at the end of the third season, Chuck indicates that father was distant for much longer, as Ellie had to raise Chuck and manage the family finances when she was twelve due to the fact that their father was too busy with his work after their mother left; their mother supposedly left within days of Chuck breaking Mary's necklace.

At some point, Stephen learned what the government intended to do with the Intersect and knew that others would want it too, whereas he wanted to use it to help people as a learning device. Stephen decided then that he had to go on the run, and stay away from his children in order to protect them. It was also mentioned by Stephen and Bryce, that he requested Bryce keep an eye out for Chuck while at Stanford and was a key reason Bryce had Chuck expelled, so the CIA wouldn't 'ruin' him.

After completing the original Cipher, Stephen purged his personal records and disappeared. Ever since, he has been the target of a major global manhunt by the NSA. According to the "Spy Dossiers" at NBC.com, the manhunt has continued for "over five years," and General Beckman claims to have "had an army of analysts and spies hunting for Orion since before [Sarah Walker was] in a training bra," which if taken at all literally would indicate a much longer manhunt given that Walker is roughly 26 when Beckman makes the claim.

With only his codename to go on, Stephen was targeted by both the government and Fulcrum. Fulcrum assigned Vincent to the task of tracking him down. Stephen faked his death on several occasions. Stephen's mastery of computer systems allowed him to stay one step ahead of his pursuers, to the point that the NSA issued a directive that all communication pertaining to the hunt for Orion be carried out via non-electronic means.

"Chuck Versus the Ring" reveals that Stephen had asked Bryce Larkin to look out for his son after he found out the latter protected Chuck at Stanford. Orion asked Larkin to keep him away from the Intersect project, however it was Bryce's familiarity with Stephen and the Intersect that played a role in his decision to send it to Chuck. After the Intersect 2.0 is retrieved by the CIA, Stephen reprograms the Intersect under the condition that Stephen and Chuck are left alone, but notes that Bryce has altered the original design, giving the recipient physical capabilities. In addition Bryce promised Orion that he would not allow the Intersect to fall into the wrong hands.

== Series ==
Stephen Bartowski first becomes a major part of the ongoing arc in "Chuck Versus the Sensei," when Chuck promises Ellie that he will find their father to walk her down the aisle at her wedding. At that time, Stephen's most recent known location was in Las Vegas, Nevada. Chuck's search turns up mostly dead ends, and Ellie resigns herself to the search failing.

Stephen first appears (as Orion) in "Chuck Versus the Predator." Vincent tracks him to Hong Kong, but Bartowski nearly kills him with a MQ-1 Predator armed UAV and escapes. Chuck attracts his father's attention when he begins an off-book search for Orion after being alerted by Howard Busgang that Orion could help him remove the Intersect. Stephen later attempts to arrange a meeting with Chuck, but interference by Beckman allows Vincent to catch up with and ambush him. Stephen escapes by faking his death by directing his Reaper drone to shoot down the helicopter Chuck thinks he is aboard. Before this incident, Stephen had left Chuck plans for the Fulcrum Intersect to guide his son on his personal quest to remove the Intersect from his brain. He also warns Chuck not to trust Casey or Sarah with the information.

Later, Sarah makes an unauthorized CIA database search for Stephen on Chuck's behalf, and Stephen allows her to successfully locate him after his son's efforts failed. In "Chuck Versus the Dream Job," Chuck and Sarah meet with him in his trailer, and although initially reluctant, Stephen agrees to accompany him home. The reunion with his daughter goes less smoothly, and Stephen is upset to learn Chuck has accepted a job with his rival, Ted Roark. Stephen later tells Chuck that it was ok if he wanted to work for Roark after Ellie accused him of putting Chuck up to wrecking the release of Roark's new computer operating system.

Chuck connects Orion's Intersect schematics with Roark's office compound, and he infiltrates the building on his own after Casey and Sarah refuse to believe his argument that Roark was building an Intersect. Stephen takes advantage of the opportunity and goes to Roark's offices himself under the guise of asking Roark not to fire Chuck for disrupting his software launch earlier. There, he reveals the truth of his history to Chuck and attempts to help him remove the Intersect. After Stephen and Chuck are surrounded by Roark, Vincent, and a team of commandos, Stephen convinces Roark to release Chuck if he agrees to help him finish the Intersect. As Sarah and Casey (who had followed them) take Chuck away to safety, he admits that he was wrong when he told Chuck not to trust his handlers. Chuck is unable to tell Ellie the truth about what happened to their father, so she is left believing he had deserted them again.

Chuck began another search for him, first by using Dr. Jill Roberts, which eventually led him to flash on the location where he was being held. Agent Walker and Chuck go on an unauthorized mission to rescue him, with Colonel John Casey in pursuit. Eventually, Chuck's handlers rescue him after he completes the Intersect Cube for FULCRUM. However, he had encoded it with images to erase the Intersect from Chuck's mind rather than encode images into FULCRUM agents minds. Chuck eventually brings him back to Ellie for the rehearsal dinner, explaining his tardiness to Ellie by saying he had to get her wedding present.

In "Chuck Versus the Ring," Stephen aided Bryce, Sarah, and Chuck in thwarting Roark's attempt to kill Ellie. He also agreed to turn over the Intersect Cube to Bryce because he knew he was someone Stephen could trust. When Chuck was determined to help Sarah protect the Intersect Cube, he gave his wrist computer to his son.

In the final episodes of season 3, the espionage conglomerate known as the Ring are looking for Stephen. One of their agents, Justin Sullivan, posed as CIA to coerce Ellie into helping find him. Ellie did this through a set of advertisements, which Stephen set up so his children could contact him. However, instead of revealing his whereabouts, he returned right to Burbank. He determined that with Chuck's handlers being around and by throwing a knife at his face and Chuck catching it in mid-air that he downloaded the Intersect 2.0. Feeling betrayed, Stephen left for his cabin in the woods, but not before Ellie pins a tracking device on his coat, enabling the Ring to track him. Luckily, Chuck and Sarah are able to defeat his captors. It is later revealed that the reason why the Ring was looking for Stephen is because he possessed the Governor, a device designed to prevent a human Intersect from falling into dementia and eventually insanity due to continual flashing. Once Stephen had determined that Chuck had downloaded the new Intersect, he began to fabricate a Governor for him.

The device was completed in "Chuck Versus the Subway." When Daniel Shaw sprung his trap for the team, Stephen helped his son escape CIA custody and, when Chuck insisted on going back to rescue Sarah and Casey he accompanied him in the rescue effort. After discovering the lab where Shaw was saved he was shot and killed by Shaw. With his death, an automated recording was delivered to Chuck's computer, directing him to the family's old home. Stephen revealed he was working in secret against Volkoff Industries, a threat that the government couldn't deal with, in which his wife was somehow involved.

=== Legacy ===
In "Chuck Versus the First Fight", it is revealed that Stephen had left behind a 1968 Ford Mustang for Ellie, which secretly hides one of his laptops behind the driver's seat. As later explained in "Chuck Versus the Leftovers", the laptop contained Stephen's research on the human brain and the Intersect, which he intended Ellie to follow up. Chuck is able to acquire the laptop and used it to reactivate his Intersect.

Although Volkoff spoke disparagingly of Stephen, Chuck used his father's values as part of his final plans to bring down the organization, which Chuck credits to his father: "Chuck Versus the Push Mix" confirms that Stephen and Mary had remained in contact ever since her disappearance when going under cover, and that the final key to Volkoff's defeat was a virus written by Stephen which downloaded the entire Hydra database to a computer at his cabin. Volkoff later admits to Mary in "Chuck Versus the Family Volkoff" that he was never worthy of her love, as Stephen was. In "Chuck Versus Agent X", it is revealed that Volkoff was once a friend and partner of Stephen, his real name Hartley Winterbottom, alias Agent X, and the first human Intersect. His time as the Intersect damaged his mind, making his cover his only identity and he was disavowed by the CIA when they couldn't extract him. Stephen had worked tirelessly to try and save his friend and repair his identity.

In the fourth-season finale, "Chuck Versus the Cliffhanger", Volkoff's personality is restored to that of Hartley Winterbottom. At the end of the episode, Clyde Decker reveals that it was no coincidence that Chuck received the Intersect and had to face Fulcrum, the Ring, Daniel Shaw, and Agent X.

== Development ==
Scott Bakula was announced to be playing the role of Stephen Bartowski in January, 2009 as part of an extended arc to close out the season. In addition to his resemblance to Zachary Levi, Bakula was cast as Stephen Bartowski because Josh Schwartz and Chris Fedak consider themselves huge Quantum Leap fans, and found Bakula's ability to jump from comedy to drama to action reminiscent of Zachary Levi's. Chris Fedak has stated that Stephen Bartowski being Orion was part of the show's background mythology from the conception of the series, describing Chuck as Luke Skywalker and born into his role, rather than Peter Parker, who stumbled into it.

Critical reaction to Bakula's performance has been overwhelmingly positive. Bakula was praised for his off-beat and slightly crazy performance, and was noted as being the ideal casting choice.

Numerous references were made to Stephen throughout the first and second season building towards his introduction, including his "Aces, Charles," referenced previously by Ellie, and used by Stephen himself in "Chuck Versus the Dream Job." Amusingly, Chuck wore one of his father's suits to Bryce Larkin's funeral, despite actor Zachary Levi being several inches taller than Bakula.

On January 8, 2010, Michael Ausiello reported that Bakula would be returning for an arc over the final six episodes of Chuck's third season, which Schwartz called "the biggest thing we've ever done on the show."

=== Personality ===
When first introduced in "Chuck Versus the Dream Job," Stephen is shown as disheveled, paranoid, and eccentric. Chuck and Ellie both call him a little crazy, as he insists on having played a part in the development of touch-screen, plasma television, and other technologies, as well as for his accusations that Ted Roark stole all of his best ideas (however, later revelations suggest his claims were true). Chuck said he was "never really there" after their mother left them, leaving Chuck and Ellie largely to fend for themselves. He took a quick liking to Devon and advised him on how to handle the rough patch he was in with Ellie after the events of his bachelor party. Despite his quirks, Chuck told Stephen he missed his advice.

Stephen was brilliant and tech-savvy, and after revealing his true identity to Chuck also proved to be competent in hand-to-hand combat, easily taking control of the security doors and disabling Vincent when the Fulcrum operative attempted to capture them in Roark's campus. He considered the Intersect the greatest thing he ever created, after his two children, and suggested that Chuck may be an even better engineer than he was. Although Stephen abandoned them many years earlier, he loved his children dearly and only left to protect them from those who wanted his knowledge. He saved Chuck's life by agreeing to help Ted Roark complete the Fulcrum Intersect if he allowed Chuck to walk away. However, he double-crossed Roark and Fulcrum by programming it to remove the Intersect from Chuck, as he had originally intended.

In "Chuck Versus the Ring" he knocked out Roark as Roark tried to escape Casey's special forces team. Stephen remarked that he had been waiting twenty years to do that. Later the episode reveals that, like Chuck, he has the ability to retain an Intersect in his head, though his earlier Intersect is slower and seems to cause greater pain than Chuck's.

Stephen was incredibly paranoid. He moved often and refrained from contacting any family members, for his and their protection. The only way Ellie could contact him was by leaving an encoded message in the classified section of the newspaper. He was also obsessed with technology, particularly computers, giving electricity for his perimeter monitors and workshop priority over basic needs such as heat and water (though water and heat are available in the woods through means not involving public utilities).

== References to Popular Culture ==
- Orion can be a reference to the Metallica instrumental of the same name.
- Scott Bakula referenced his previous role as Dr. Sam Beckett on Quantum Leap in the scene where Stephen is reunited with Ellie. Ellie, shocked by his reappearance and angry at his many years of absence, reminds him of the pancakes he promised to make for dinner just before he disappeared. Stephen only manages to respond with "Oh boy!" This was Sam Beckett's catch phrase, which he would utter whenever he "leaped" into a new body and discovered his new (and typically dangerous, embarrassing or compromising) situation.
- Like his previous role as Sam Beckett, Stephen Bartowski shares the initials of 'SB' with Scott Bakula.
- Bakula further referenced Quantum Leap while hosting the lead-in to Chuck during the airing of "Chuck Versus the Dream Job," on April 6, 2009, when he remarked about feeling like he'd been there before, but that being quite a leap. Quantum Leap aired on NBC during the "Monday 8/7c" timeslot, on which Chuck (Season 2) ran.
- In "Chuck Versus the Colonel" the Black Rock location where Stephen is being held prisoner turns out to be a drive-in movie theater called Starbright. Starbright was the name of the project Sam Beckett worked on that preceded Project Quantum Leap.
