= Bonita Friedericy =

American actress (born 1961)

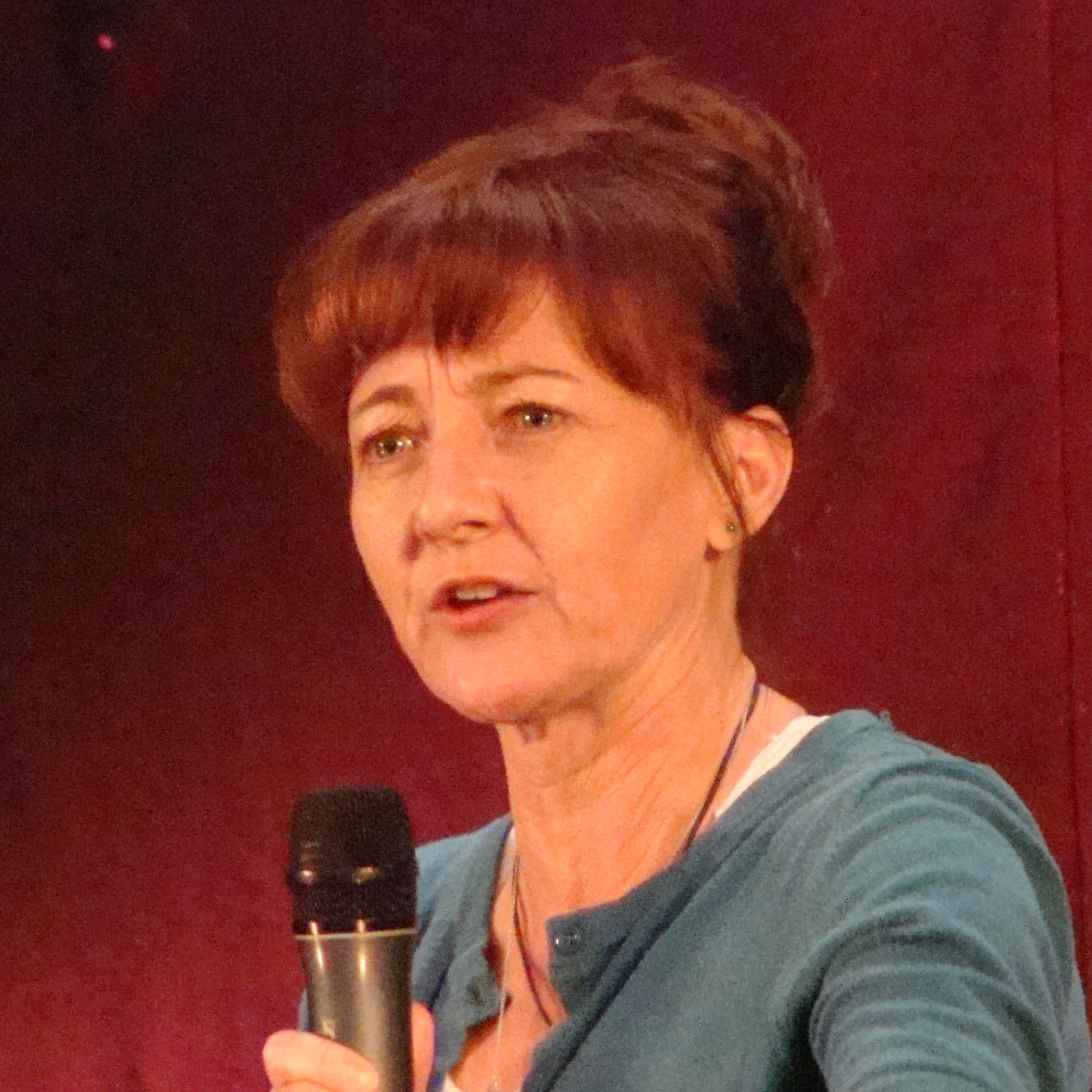
- Friedericy in 2010
- Born: Bonita Anne Friedericy; October 10, 1961 (age 64); Charlottesville, Virginia, US
- Occupation: Actress
- Years active: 1997–present
- Spouse: John Billingsley

Bonita Anne Friedericy (born October 10, 1961) is an American actress, best known for her role as Diane Beckman in the television series Chuck. Her husband is actor John Billingsley.

== Early life ==
Friedericy was born in Charlottesville, Virginia, was raised in Palos Verdes, California, and worked as a teacher for nearly 13 years to help supplement her acting income.

== Career ==
In the 1990s, she began her career on stage, and won Ovation Award for her role in the Los Angeles production of Our Country's Good. She later guest-starred in a number of television shows, such as Malcolm in the Middle, Veronica Mars, Star Trek: Enterprise, Criminal Minds, Bones, Dharma & Greg, Parks and Recreation, The Nine, The West Wing, CSI: Crime Scene Investigation, Castle, Monk. In film, Friedericy appeared in Christmas with the Kranks, Alien Raiders, Paranormal Activity 3, and The Lords of Salem.

From 2007 to 2012, Friedericy starred in the NBC comedy series Chuck as NSA General Diane Beckman for the show's entire five-season run. She had a recurring role in the first three seasons, and was promoted as a series regular in the fourth season. In November 2013, she was cast as series regular in the Lifetime comedy-drama UnREAL opposite Shiri Appleby, in the role of a psychologist. She later was replaced by Amy Hill in the role. In 2015, she appeared on the second season of ABC's How to Get Away with Murder.

She provided the voice of Caroline Becker in the 2014 video game Wolfenstein: The New Order, a member of the underground Allied resistance group Kreisau Circle.

== Filmography ==
=== Film ===
Year	Title	Role
1997	Glass, Necktie	Chloe
1998	Malaika	Thelma
1999	The Pornographer	Irene
1999	The Debtors	Woman addict #2
2000	Big Wind on Campus	Emily's Mom
2002	Par 6	Woman
2003	House of Sand and Fog	Motel Manager
2004	Christmas with the Kranks	Jude Becker
2006	Sleeping Dogs Lie	Mom / Wrestling Girl
2006	Akeelah and the Bee	Volunteer
2007	Next	Cashier Girl
2007	South of Pico	Joanna
2008	Alien Raiders	Charlotte
2009	Miss March	Diner Waitress
2010	Percy Jackson & the Olympians: The Lightning Thief	Hysterical Woman
2011	Paranormal Activity 3	Dorothy Wolfe
2012	The Lords of Salem	Abigail Hennessey
2013	Shotgun Wedding	Yvette
2015	Unfinished Business	Helen
2016	Madtown	Linda Miller
2016	Salt Water	Aspen's mom

=== Television ===
Year	Title	Role	Notes
1998	Mad About You	Bonita	Episode: "The Baby Video"
1998	Maggie	Pet Owner	Episode: "Liar, Liar"
1998	One World	Saleswoman	Episode: "The Gift"
1999	Payne	Cold Water Woman	Episode: "Trouble in Room 206"
1999	Buffy the Vampire Slayer	Mrs. Finkle	2 episodes
1999	Oh Baby	Woman #2	Episode: "Sitting on Babies"
1999	The Practice	Sandra Poole	Episode: "Free Dental"
1999	Time of Your Life	Pauline	Episode: "The Time They Had Not"
1999	The Drew Carey Show	Sally	Episode: "Drew and Kate's First Date"
1999, 2002	Judging Amy	Clarissa Owens / Mrs. Thompson	2 episodes
2000	Family Law	Woman	Episode: "Stealing Home"
2000	Chicken Soup for the Soul	Mrs. Lathum	Episode: "The Right Thing"
2000	3rd Rock from the Sun	Tourist #2	Episode: "Dick and Harry Fall Down a Hole"
2000	Strong Medicine		Episode: "BRCA1"
2000	The Stepdaughter	Nurse Calista Davis	Video
2001	Spin City	Edith Connelly, Housekeeper	Episode: "The Gambler"
2001	Becker	Ms. Owen	Episode: "The Ugly Truth"
2001	Dharma & Greg	Paula	Episode: "Judy & Greg"
2001	Boston Public	Nurse Carey DiPietro	Episode: "Chapter Nineteen"
2001	Any Day Now	Woman	Episode: "Everyone Deserves to Be Loved"
2001	Off Centre	Woman In Couch	Episode: "Swing Time"
2002	My Adventures in Television	Nurse	Episode: "The Art of Groveling"
2002	Malcolm in the Middle	Susan	Episode: "Jury Duty"
2002	Scrubs	Nurse	Episode: "My Nightingale"
2002	The Guardian	Penny	Episode: "The Living"
2002	In-Laws	Adelle Morris	Episode: "Halloween: Resurrection"
2003	Dragnet		Episode: "The Big Ruckus"
2003	Alias	Joyce	Episode: "Firebomb"
2003	Angel	Patience	Episode: "Peace Out"
2003	Star Trek: Enterprise	Rooney	Episode: "Regeneration"
2003	The Division	Bonnie Harper	Episode: "Castaways"
2003	Miracles	Leslie Brown	Episode: "You Are My Sunshine"
2003	7th Heaven	Sofie the Waitress	Episode: "Angel"
2004	Veronica Mars	Evelyn Bugby	Episode: "The Girl Next Door"
2004	LAX	Geraldine	Episode: "Thanksgiving"
2004, 2006	The West Wing	Gail Addison	2 episodes
2005	Over There	Hope	Episode: "Mission Accomplished"
2005	Bones	Sharon Eller	Episode: "Pilot"
2005	Rodney	Admitting Nurse	Episode: "Question Mark Hamilton"
2005	The 12 Dogs of Christmas	Aunt Delores	Television film
2005	Criminal Minds	Dr. Rachel Howard	Episode: "The Fox"
2006	CSI: Crime Scene Investigation	Mrs. Bradford	Episode: "Werewolves"
2006	Monk	Housewife Juror	Episode: "Mr. Monk Gets Jury Duty"
2006	Without a Trace	Sister Louise	Episode: "Requiem"
2006	The Nine	Mary Foote	3 episodes
2007	The Middle	Gail	Television film
2007–2012	Chuck	General Diane Beckman	78 episodes
2008	My Name Is Earl	Ruth	2 episodes
2008	Fear Itself	Debra Fabre	Episode: "Community"
2008	Night Life	Nurse	Television film
2008	The Starter Wife	Anthea	3 episodes
2009	A Temporary Life	Lois Rosenthal	Television film
2010	Parks and Recreation	Maria	Episode: "Leslie's House"
2010	Twentysixmiles	Sister Consuela	3 episodes
2012	Written by a Kid	Mom	Episodes: "The Ginger Potato"
2012	Castle	Sister Mary	Episodes: "After Hours"
2013	Justified	Mary	Episode: "Kin"
2013	Hart of Dixie	Nut Allergy	Episode: "On the Road Again"
2013	Welcome to the Family	Sandra / Gretchen	2 episodes
2013	Sketchy	Sally	Episode: "Forwarders"
2014	Days of Our Lives	Monica	Episode #1.12321
2014	Intelligence	Governor Christy Cameron	Episode: "Being Human"
2014	Sock Monkee Therapy	Vivian	Episode: "Harold & Vivian"
2015	How to Get Away with Murder	Sandra Guthrie	2 episodes
2015–2016	Impastor	Hilva Schmidt	6 episodes
2016	American Crime Story	Patti Goldman	2 episodes
2016	The Friendless Five	Agent Huerta	3 episodes
2016	Rizzoli & Isles	Mary Sokoloff	Episode: "Yesterday, Today, Tomorrow"
2016	Gilmore Girls: A Year in the Life	Nun #1	Episode: "Fall"
2016–2017	Preacher	Terri Loach	6 episodes
2017	Major Crimes	Judge Ellen Holly	Episode: "Intersection"
2018	Groomzilla	Kasha Rydell	Television film
2018	Video Palace	Bets Mueller	2 episodes
2019	Dwight in Shining Armor	Nana	11 episodes
2020	The Good Doctor	Bella Thomas	Episodes: "Sex and Death"
2021	Chicago Med	Terri Hammer	Recurring role
2023	9-1-1: Lone Star	Trudy Keyes	Episode: "Abandoned"
2026	The Pitt	Cora Wilkins	3 episodes
