= Chuck Versus the Last Details =

- Chuck episode
- Sarah collapses in Chuck's arms.
- Episode no.: Season 4 Episode 23
- Directed by: Peter Lauer
- Written by: Henry Alonso Myers; Kristin Newman
- Production code: 3X6323
- Original air date: May 9, 2011

Guest appearances
- Linda Hamilton as Mary Elizabeth Bartowski; Lauren Cohan as Vivian Volkoff; Mekenna Melvin as Alex McHugh; Michael Bailey Smith as Vlad; Ray Wise as Riley; Graham Clarke as Sebastian Carlisle

Episode chronology
← Previous "Chuck Versus Agent X"	Next → "Chuck Versus the Cliffhanger"
- Chuck season 4

"Chuck Versus the Last Details" is the 23rd episode of the fourth season of Chuck, and the 77th overall episode of the series. The episode was written by Henry Alonso Myers and Kristin Newman, and directed by Peter Lauer. It originally aired on May 9, 2011.

In the episode, Chuck Bartowski (Zachary Levi) and Sarah Walker's (Yvonne Strahovski) wedding preparation includes one final detail: ensuring that the mother-of-the-groom, Mary (Linda Hamilton), makes it to the ceremony alive. Meanwhile, Morgan Grimes's (Joshua Gomez) responsibilities as best man include his most dangerous mission yet, as he faces Vivian Volkoff (Lauren Cohan). Elsewhere, Ellie Woodcomb (Sarah Lancaster) tends to the last details of the rehearsal dinner and seeks help from an unlikely source.

"Chuck Versus the Last Details" received generally positive reviews from critics. According to the Nielsen ratings system, it drew 4.1 million viewers, the third-lowest number in Chuck's history, after "Chuck Versus the Family Volkoff" and "Chuck Versus Agent X". It had a 2.4/4 share among all households and 1.4/4 share among those aged 18–49.

== Plot ==
Mary Elizabeth Bartowski (Linda Hamilton) sneaks into a mine in Amacayacu, Colombia to retrieve the fully assembled "Norseman" weapon, only to be captured by Vivian Volkoff (Lauren Cohan) and Riley (Ray Wise). To ensure that Mary is at his wedding, Chuck Bartowski (Zachary Levi) travels to the mine and rescues Mary, leaving best man Morgan Grimes (Joshua Gomez) in charge of creating a video montage as his wedding present to Sarah Walker (Yvonne Strahovski). Morgan allows Jeff Barnes (Scott Krinsky), Lester Patel (Vik Sahay), and Big Mike (Mark Christopher Lawrence) to create the first cut so that he can partake in the mission, but John Casey (Adam Baldwin) forces Morgan to stay in Burbank due to Alex McHugh's (Mekenna Melvin) worry for his safety.

Later, Morgan is assigned to infiltrate the meeting where Vivian intends to sell the Norseman, posing as a recently captured criminal he closely resembles. At the meeting, Riley uses the Norseman to kill all the buyers, eliminating all "competition" to Volkoff Industries. Because the Norseman was attuned to the DNA of the buyer Morgan was impersonating, rather than Morgan himself, Morgan pretends to be dead and is able to escape unharmed, but the team is forced to confront Riley and Vivian, who believes Chuck to be "Agent X". Chuck then reveals the truth that Vivian's father Alexei Volkoff was Agent X. Riley twists the information to further manipulate and shape Vivian, only to be shot and killed by Sarah. Vivian, however, manages to escape.

At Chuck and Sarah's rehearsal dinner, Morgan tells Alex that he will stop going on missions and simply become an analyst. Chuck's sister Ellie (Sarah Lancaster) is unable to make her own video montage, having previewed and rejected Lester's deeply disturbed first cut. However, Jeff offers his own flawless cut of the montage, being rewarded with a kiss from Ellie. During the video, Chuck gets a phone call from Vivian, who intends to make him suffer. Vivian activates the Norseman device on a target at the dinner, who Chuck initially fears is his mother. Suddenly, Sarah's nose starts to bleed and she collapses in Chuck's arms as he calls out for help.

== Production ==
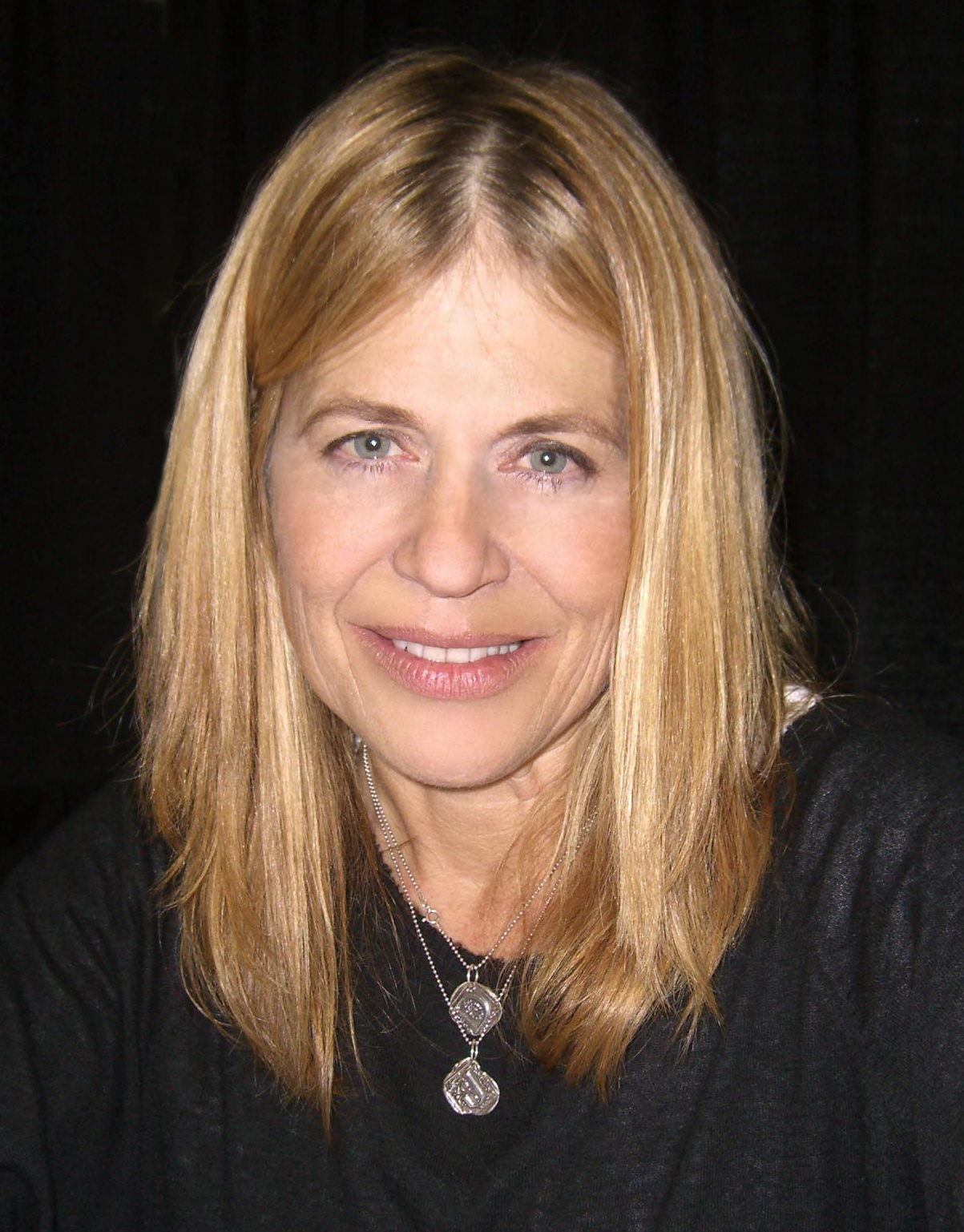
Linda Hamilton guest starred in this episode.

"Chuck Versus the Last Details" was directed by Peter Lauer, based on a script by Henry Alonso Myers and Kristin Newman. The episode originally aired in the United States on May 9, 2011, on NBC as the 23rd episode of Chuck's fourth season and the 77th episode overall.

Zap2it confirmed in April 2011 that Linda Hamilton, Lauren Cohan, Mekenna Melvin, and Ray Wise would reprise their recurring roles of Mary Elizabeth Bartowski, Vivian Volkoff, Alex McHugh, and Riley, respectively. Michael Bailey Smith also guest starred as a Volkoff security guard, Vlad.

Series co-creator Chris Fedak revealed at the 2011 Chicago Comic & Entertainment Expo that the series would focus less on the band Jeffster! than on Jeff and Lester's "other obsession" as amateur film makers, saying that the "two young "au-teurs" will "ma-ture" right in front of [the audience]."

=== Cultural references ===
Multiple references are made to the Star Wars saga throughout the episode. Chuck directly compares their attempting to sneak in to Vivian's base to the same method used by Luke Skywalker and Han Solo to rescue Princess Leia in the original film, by referring to the bound Casey as "Chewie." During the same scene Casey mutters "I have a bad feeling about this," a catch-phrase used by characters throughout the film series. The series is twice referenced directly, by Chuck when Sarah fails to understand his "Chewie" reference, and by Casey, who says, "This is what happens when you draw your plans from Star Wars." Chuck and Morgan also make use of "The Imperial March" as a means to prepare Morgan for his mission to pose as a villain while infiltrating a meeting with Vivian.

The episode contains a number of other references. Sarah comments that she has "finally" watched Mannequin. Mary is later shown doing pull-ups from her bed frame in her prison cell, referencing the film Terminator 2: Judgment Day, where Sarah Connor (also portrayed by Hamilton) did the same thing. While practicing his Italian accent, Morgan quotes video game character Mario's catchphrase "It's me, Mario!" Morgan later comments that buckets of acid are going to be used in the same way as on Breaking Bad, recommending the series to Casey.

== Reception ==
"Chuck Versus the Last Details" received the third-fewest viewers of any episode in the season. According to the Nielsen ratings system, it drew 4.099 million viewers, higher only than "Chuck Versus the Family Volkoff" and "Chuck Versus Agent X". The episode had a 2.4/4 share among all households and 1.4/4 share among those aged 18–49.

The episode received positive reviews from critics. HitFix Senior Editor Alan Sepinwall wrote, "It wasn't a perfect episode, mainly because Vivian remains a fairly muddled, bratty villain, and because I don't feel like the show ever really used Ray Wise to his full potential. But so much of it was so satisfying, both emotionally and comedically, that, until Vivian called Chuck during the rehearsal dinner, I actually thought to myself, 'You know, this would be a pretty damn good finale in and of itself.'" Ryan McGee of The A.V. Club rated the episode a B on an A+ to F scale. McGee wrote, "The last act was fairly phenomenal, but we had to get through a lot of troubling material in order to achieve true liftoff on the hour. With so many loose ends to wrap up, the hour felt overstuffed: the impending wedding, The Norseman, Agent X, Morgan's first field assignment...I mean, that's a lot of stuff. And it doesn't help that Vivian Volkoff is at the center of three of those things, and inserted herself into the fourth at the last moment. And in thinking about the clunkiness of aspects of this episode, I thought about the clunkiness of this latter half of the season as a whole." Eric Goldman of IGN gave this episode a score of 8.5 out of 10, writing that it was a mistake not to include Timothy Dalton as Alexei Volkoff after the plot twists of the previous episode. Sarah Stegall of SFScope wrote, "Chuck is killing me by inches. So close, so close to the Chuck/Sarah wedding, but things keep going wrong."
