= Chuck Versus Agent X =

- Chuck episode
- The true identity of Agent X is revealed.
- Episode no.: Season 4 Episode 22
- Directed by: Robert Duncan McNeill
- Written by: Phil Klemmer; Craig diGregorio
- Production code: 3X6322
- Original air date: May 2, 2011

Guest appearances
- India de Beaufort as Jasmine; Millicent Martin as Mrs. Winterbottom; Ray Wise as Riley

Episode chronology
← Previous "Chuck Versus the Wedding Planner"	Next → "Chuck Versus the Last Details"
- Chuck season 4

"Chuck Versus Agent X" is the 22nd episode of the fourth season of the American action-comedy television series Chuck, and the 76th overall episode of the series. The episode was written by Phil Klemmer and Craig DiGregorio and directed by Robert Duncan McNeill. It originally aired on May 2, 2011.

In the episode, Chuck Bartowski's (Zachary Levi) bachelor party turns up some uninvited guests. Meanwhile, Ellie Bartowski-Woodcomb (Sarah Lancaster) discovers the true identity of Agent X while investigating her father Stephen's computer.

"Chuck Versus Agent X" received generally positive reviews from critics. According to the Nielsen ratings system, it drew 4.097 million viewers, the second-lowest number in Chuck's history, after "Chuck Versus the Family Volkoff". It had a 2.5/4 share among all households and 1.4/4 share among those aged 18–49.

== Plot ==
As Chuck Bartowski (Zachary Levi) contemplates confronting his sister Ellie (Sarah Lancaster) about her secret research into their late father Stephen's laptop, Chuck and his fiancée Sarah Walker (Yvonne Strahovski) prepare for their bachelor and bachelorette parties.

At her bachelorette party, hosted by Ellie, Sarah is notified by General Diane Beckman that Stephen's laptop is being tracked by Volkoff Industries agents Riley (Ray Wise) and Jasmine (India de Beaufort), who, due to the imprisonment of international arms dealer Alexei Volkoff, are now under the leadership of Volkoff's daughter Vivian. Thinking that Riley and Jasmine are going to arrive at Ellie's apartment, Sarah tells Ellie that Chuck knows Ellie lied to him and still has the laptop. However, Ellie and Sarah then realize that the laptop has been mistakenly taken by Ellie's husband Devon Woodcomb (Ryan McPartlin) to Chuck's bachelor party.

Meanwhile, despite Chuck and his guests' belief that Devon was hosting Chuck's bachelor party in Las Vegas, Nevada, they are taken to Las Vecas National Park. As some of the guests attempt to escape the camping trip, they are ambushed by Riley's mercenaries, who are tracking the laptop Devon unknowingly brought with him. Chuck and his friends escape, but the laptop is stabbed by Jasmine in the process.

When Chuck returns, he and Ellie tell each other the truth, with Ellie revealing that she is still investigating her father's research, and Chuck revealing that he is still a CIA agent. Chuck then brings Ellie to Castle and demonstrates martial arts skills from the Intersect. When Chuck claims to be Agent X, the first human Intersect, Ellie informs him that, according to the laptop, someone had originally uploaded the Intersect to their brain before Chuck's birth. After Chuck repairs the computer, they find a redacted file on British scientist Hartley Winterbottom.

Chuck, Sarah, and John Casey (Adam Baldwin) travel to Winterbottom's home in Somerset, UK, and confront Winterbottom's mother (Millicent Martin), who blames the CIA for corrupting her son. However, Chuck is revealed to be Stephen Bartowski's son, earning her trust, as Hartley and Stephen were once colleagues and close friends. When Riley and Jasmine arrive with an assault team, Mrs. Winterbottom sends Chuck and Sarah to retrieve Hartley's "spy will" while she and Casey fight back the assault team. When they run out of ammunition, Mrs. Winterbottom sets a trap that explodes and kills Jasmine and the assault team. When Ellie, Chuck, Sarah, Casey, and Morgan Grimes (Joshua Gomez) return to the Castle, open Hartley's spy will, they discover a photograph of Volkoff, realizing that Volkoff is actually Agent X - Hartley.

Startled, the team reads the files on his last mission; which was to assist on a complicated cover-up, a black operation posing as international arms dealer Alexei Volkoff. The personality and knowledge of Volkoff was uploaded into the prototype Intersect by Stephen Bartowski and downloaded into the mind of Hartley so he could use it as a cover. However, the prototype Intersect was so unstable that the Volkoff personality pushed out and replaced Hartley's own identity. Subsumed by his new identity Hartley, as Volkoff, established his criminal empire.

With the realization, Casey closes the spy will and orders everyone to keep quiet about this, since the information about CIA creating its "own worst enemy" was simply hidden and buried to ensure secrecy, and that they will be most likely eliminated if anything is told. However, Ellie objects and dedicates herself to help Volkoff restore his identity, to which Chuck agrees. Casey grudgingly and reluctantly supports them, before sealing the will in a secret safe deep in the Castle.

== Production ==
"Chuck Versus Agent X" was one of many episodes to be directed by producer Robert Duncan McNeill, and was written by Phil Klemmer and Craig DiGregorio. It originally aired in the United States on May 2, 2011, on NBC as the 22nd episode of Chuck's fourth season and the 76th episode overall.

Chuck cast members revealed at the 2011 Chicago Comic & Entertainment Expo that the season would include a "funny, camping-themed" bachelor party episode featuring Casey, Big Mike, and the fictional band Jeffster!. The cast also confirmed that Ray Wise would reprise his role as Alexei Volkoff's lawyer, Riley. India de Beaufort guest starred as Jasmine, and Millicent Martin as Hartley Winterbottom's mother. Sarah Lancaster revealed to IGN that the Snakes of Toluca Lake, the strippers which Ellie hires for Sarah, were played by the real-life Hollywood Men. Lancaster enjoyed filming the scene, which took hours to perform, solely due to Yvonne Strahovski's discomfort. Strahovski stated that the men became "bolder" with each take, gradually moving closer to her. Principal photography for "Chuck Versus Agent X" ended on April 10.

Series co-creator Chris Fedak stated in a later interview that the inspiration for Volkoff's true identity as a gun-shy British scientist was Timothy Dalton's portrayal of Gregory Tuttle, Volkoff's guise as Mary Elizabeth Bartowski's MI6 handler, in his first appearance on the series. A photograph of Dalton before his portrayal of James Bond is used to represent a young Hartley Winterbottom.

== Cultural references ==
- Osama bin Laden's image is featured on a target for Casey's shooting range. Coincidentally, bin Laden was killed in a raid on May 1, 2011, around 16:00 Eastern Daylight Time, one day before the episode was aired.
- In the Somerset home of Agent X, Casey briefly wields an M60 machine gun during the shoot-out. In the film Full Metal Jacket, Adam Baldwin's character Animal Mother wields an identical weapon during the Vietnam War.
- The scene of Winterbottom's mother wielding the machine gun is an homage to the machine gun-toting senior citizen in Goldfinger.

== Reception ==
"Chuck Versus Agent X" drew 4.097 million viewers, the second-lowest number in Chuck's history, after "Chuck Versus the Family Volkoff". According to the Nielsen ratings system, it had a 2.5/4 share among all households and 1.4/4 share among those aged 18–49.

The episode received positive reviews from critics. Ryan McGee of The A.V. Club gave the episode an A− on an A+ to F scale. He found the episode's "reconfiguration of previous mythology" successful, and, though he found it obvious that Volkoff was Agent X, McGee wrote that "seeing a pre-Bond Dalton inside that spy will was great payoff all the same." However, McGee continued, "Much less successful was anything involving Chuck's bachelor party and Big Mike/Jeffster's subsequent desire to save their manly weekend." Eric Goldman of IGN gave this episode a score of 8.5 out of 10, writing that "the best element in all of this was the introduction of Volkoff, or make that Hartley Winterbottom's, mother and the bonding that occurred between her and John Casey." HitFix Senior Editor Alan Sepinwall, however, wrote that the episode "was kind of a hodge podge. It's a transitional episode setting up the end game with Volkoff that the season's final two episodes will focus on, but it also felt like an hour comprised of two or three different ideas that nobody could quite flesh out to fill up an entire episode, and so they were compressed together." Like McGee, Sepinwall enjoyed Wise's return, though he felt that the actor was given little to do.
