= Chuck Versus the Cliffhanger =

- Chuck episode
- Episode no.: Season 4 Episode 24
- Directed by: Robert Duncan McNeill
- Written by: Chris Fedak; Nicholas Wootton
- Production code: 3X6324
- Original air date: May 16, 2011

Guest appearances
- Mini Andén as Carina Miller; Richard Burgi as Clyde Decker; Lauren Cohan as Vivian McArthur; Timothy Dalton as Alexei Volkoff; Linda Hamilton as Mary Elizabeth Bartowski; Mercedes Masohn as Zondra; Mekenna Melvin as Alex McHugh

Episode chronology
| ← Previous "Chuck Versus the Last Details" | Next → "Chuck Versus the Zoom" |
- Chuck season 4

"Chuck Versus the Cliffhanger" is the fourth season finale of the American NBC action-comedy television series Chuck. Aired on May 16, 2011, it is the season's 24th episode, and the 78th overall episode of the series. The episode was directed by Robert Duncan McNeill and written by series co-creator Chris Fedak, along with Nicholas Wootton. Despite the episode's eponymous cliffhanger ending, supposedly leading into a fifth season, it was anticipated that Chuck would be cancelled after the fourth season for declining viewership, making "Chuck Versus the Cliffhanger" the de facto series finale. However, a fifth and final season was ordered on May 13, 2011.

Chuck revolves around the Intersect, a government database designed by Stephen J. Bartowski. In the pilot episode of the series, Stephen's son Chuck (Zachary Levi) receives the database and accidentally uploads it to his brain. Chuck is then forced from his life as an employee at the big-box store Buy More to the spy world. By the fourth season, Chuck is a Central Intelligence Agency (CIA) agent and is engaged to one of his handlers, Sarah Walker (Yvonne Strahovski).

In the season, Chuck and his team fulfill Stephen Bartowski's last wish to destroy Volkoff Industries, led by international arms dealer Alexei Volkoff (Timothy Dalton). It is then revealed that Volkoff was actually Hartley Winterbottom, an MI6 scientist who worked with Stephen in the 1980s. In preparation for an undercover assignment as an arms dealer named Alexei Volkoff, Winterbottom became the first person to upload the Intersect. However, the upload malfunctioned, overwriting Winterbottom's personality with that of his cover, and Stephen spent the last 20 years of his life trying to fix his mistake. At the end of "Chuck Versus the Last Details", Volkoff's daughter Vivian (Lauren Cohan) learns of her father's true identity, and, holding Chuck responsible, poisons Chuck's fiancée Sarah with a Volkoff Industries weapon called "the Norseman". To save Sarah's life and stop Vivian from destroying his and Sarah's wedding, Chuck turns to Alexei for help. To keep secret Volkoff's true identity, the CIA sends its "toughest" agent, Clyde Decker (Richard Burgi), to stop Chuck.

"Chuck Versus the Cliffhanger" received overwhelmingly positive reviews from critics. According to the Nielsen ratings system, it drew 4.53 million viewers, with a 1.5/4 rating among those aged 18–49.

== Plot ==
Volkoff Industries heiress Vivian Volkoff (Lauren Cohan) decides to make Central Intelligence Agency (CIA) Agent Chuck Bartowski (Zachary Levi) suffer, based on the misconception that the CIA forced her father, MI6 scientist Hartley Winterbottom (Timothy Dalton), to upload a government database called the Intersect to his brain, accidentally overwriting his personality with that of his cover identity, arms dealer Alexei Volkoff. Vivian poisons Chuck's fiancée Sarah Walker (Yvonne Strahovski) with the Volkoff Industries "Norseman" weapon, and Sarah is rushed into the emergency room. Chuck, his mother Mary (Linda Hamilton), and ally John Casey (Adam Baldwin) set out to find an antidote to the Norseman's effects, but when Chuck breaks into the prison holding Alexei, he discovers that elite agent Clyde Decker (Richard Burgi) has anticipated his move and relocated Alexei. To protect Alexei's true identity and conceal the government's botched experiment, Decker revokes Chuck's clearance to CIA facilities.

With General Beckman's (Bonita Friedericy) aid, Chuck intercepts the transport carrying Alexei, only to find that Decker has deprogrammed Alexei and restored his previous identity and memories of Hartley Winterbottom. Hartley administers an antidote, but it fails to cure Sarah. Mary then remembers that Alexei had developed a stronger antidote, but it is stored at the Volkoff Industries Headquarters in Moscow, Russia. As they leave the hospital, Chuck, Casey, Mary, and Hartley are captured by Decker and taken to Castle, a government base under the big-box store Buy More, where Decker suppresses the Intersect in Chuck's mind. Casey helps Chuck and Hartley escape, giving Chuck discs containing clean fabricated identities for him and Sarah.

Chuck and Hartley go to Volkoff Industries, and Hartley reveals to Vivian that he went undercover voluntarily, resulting in his transformation into the villainous Volkoff. Chuck gives up the discs from Casey so Vivian and her father can start a new life. Chuck returns with the antidote to Burbank, California, where Decker is waiting for him. A standoff occurs, but as Chuck is backed up by a superior force made up of his friends, family, the C.A.T. Squad (Mini Andén and Mercedes Masöhn), and Volkoff's Spetsnaz paratroopers, Decker is forced to stand down. Using the information about Alexei as leverage against Decker, Chuck delivers the antidote.

The scene then changes to Chuck and Sarah's wedding, after which they receive a wedding present from Hartley. Two weeks later, Chuck returns from his honeymoon to a deserted Castle, where he learns from Decker that he has been manipulated his entire spy career, leading to him receiving the Intersect and facing Fulcrum, the Ring, Daniel Shaw, and Volkoff. It is then revealed that Hartley's gift was all of Volkoff Industries' assets, giving Chuck and Sarah almost a billion dollars. Chuck purchases the Buy More from the government's front company, and he, Sarah, Casey, and Morgan Grimes (Joshua Gomez) set up their own freelance spy operation in Castle to investigate the conspiracy involving Chuck. Morgan then spots a pair of glasses in a box of Chuck's belongings sent from Beckman. Morgan puts them on and accidentally uploads an Intersect.

== Production ==
"Chuck Versus the Cliffhanger" was one of many episodes to be directed by producer Robert Duncan McNeill, and was written by Chris Fedak, who co-created the series, and Nicholas Wootton, both of whom serve as executive producers. It originally aired in the United States on May 16, 2011, on NBC as the 24th episode of Chuck's fourth season and the 78th episode overall. The episode was filmed in April 2011 at North Hollywood Medical Center. Guest stars Linda Hamilton, Timothy Dalton, Lauren Cohan, Mekenna Melvin, Mini Andén, and Mercedes Masöhn reprised their recurring roles as Mary Bartowski, Alexei Volkoff, Vivian Volkoff, Alex McHugh, Carina Miller, and Zondra, respectively. The episode also introduced Richard Burgi as Clyde Decker, the CIA's "toughest" agent.

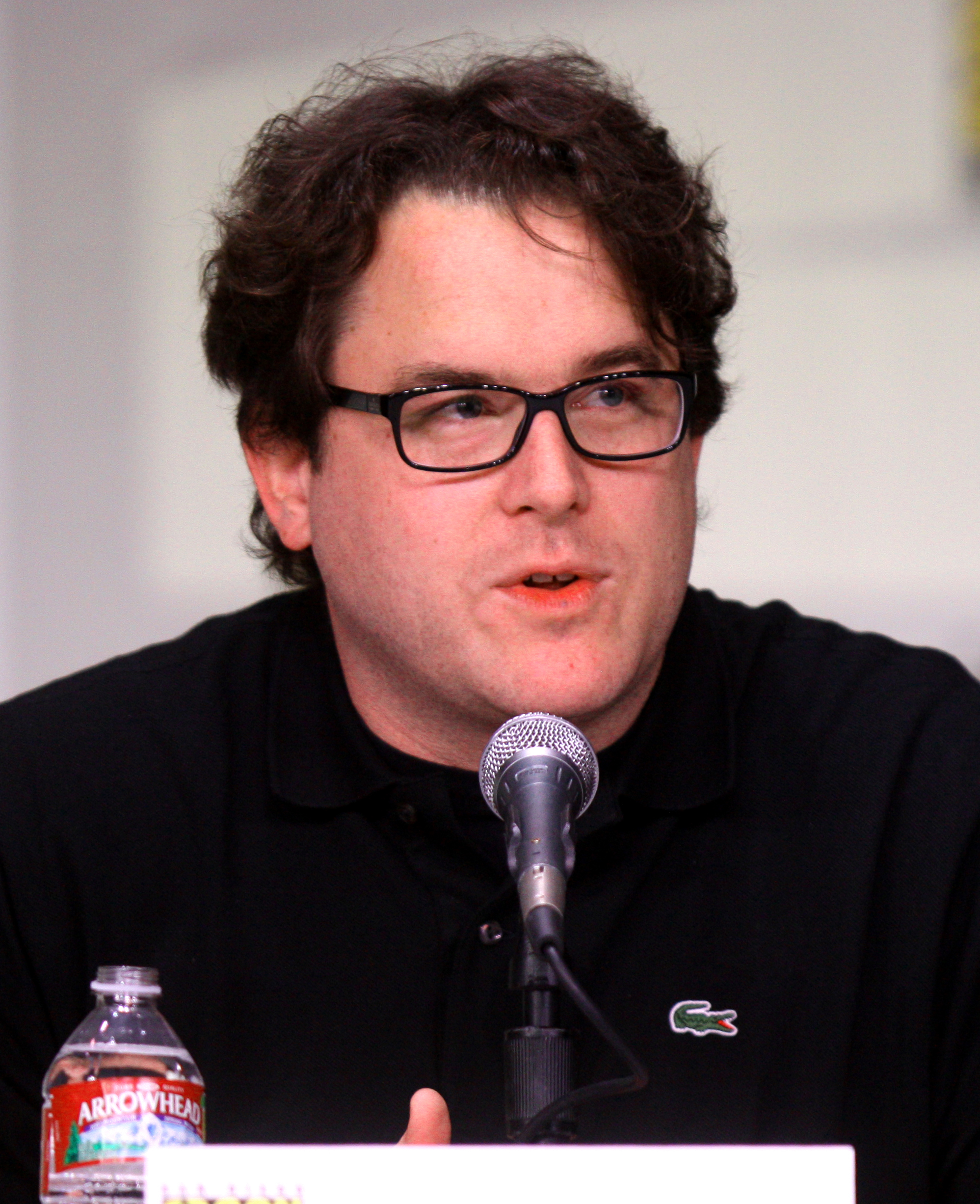
Series co-creator Chris Fedak co-wrote this episode.

Michael Ausiello had revealed in March 2011 that the fourth-season finale would be titled "Chuck Versus the Cliffhanger". Chris Fedak later confirmed that the episode, as the title suggests, would have a cliffhanger ending leading into a fifth season. Fedak stated that cliffhangers tell "more story", citing The Empire Strikes Back and Batman Begins as examples. The season had suffered two major declines in viewership, one before "Chuck Versus the Push Mix", and another after three weeks of repeated episodes, and it was predicted that NBC would cancel Chuck before the fourth season ended, making "Chuck Versus the Cliffhanger" the de facto series finale. However, a fifth and final season was ordered on May 13, 2011, and is set to premiere October 21, 2011.

"Chuck Versus the Cliffhanger" is one of the few episodes since season one's "Chuck Versus the Helicopter" not to feature the series' full credits sequence with the instrumental version of Cake's "Short Skirt/Long Jacket", instead displaying the main cast credits over action in the episode's second act. HitFix Senior Editor Alan Sepinwall has called the episode a "tying together of everything the character [Chuck] and the show have been about", including the use of a recurring spy strategy, "The Magnet", to fool Decker. As Chuck and Sarah walk to their limousine, clips of their budding romance are shown through archive footage from several earlier episodes, including the pilot episode, "Chuck Versus the Intersect". Fedak stated in an interview that the inspiration for Volkoff's true identity being a gun-shy British scientist was Dalton's portrayal of Gregory Tuttle, Volkoff's guise as Mary Bartowski's MI6 handler, in "Chuck Versus the First Fight", his first appearance on the series. Chuck's quest to save Sarah serves as a reversal of "Chuck Versus Phase Three".

"...I've always thought of cliffhangers as a great thing. It tells you more story... At the end of season 2, I always imagined that, no matter what happens, Chuck, Sarah and Casey are having amazing adventures, and the story is ongoing..."

— Chris Fedak explaining his decision to write a cliffhanger ending

Yvonne Strahovski is given limited screen time in the episode due to her character, Sarah, being in a coma. However, the episode is augmented with flashbacks taking place five days before the events of the episode, in which Chuck and Sarah deal with pre-wedding jitters by having their own rehearsal in their apartment. Thus, Chuck and Sarah's wedding vows are given added weight due to Sarah's being said early in the episode, and Chuck's being improvised from Sarah's.

Fedak stated in an interview on the day of the episode's airing that "Chuck Versus the Cliffhanger" marks a major transition in the series. As of the episode's ending, the main characters of the series are no longer government spies and no longer work for General Beckman; Chuck and Sarah have received an immense wealth; and Chuck has become the leader of a team to investigate a conspiracy involving his spy career. According to Fedak, the episode institutes a storyline in which the series returns to its roots. Morgan will be portrayed by Joshua Gomez much like Chuck was by Zachary Levi in the early seasons of the series: as a newcomer to the spy world due to the presence of the Intersect in his brain. Meanwhile, Chuck will be portrayed as Morgan's protector, much like Casey and Sarah were to him in past seasons.

== Music and cultural references ==
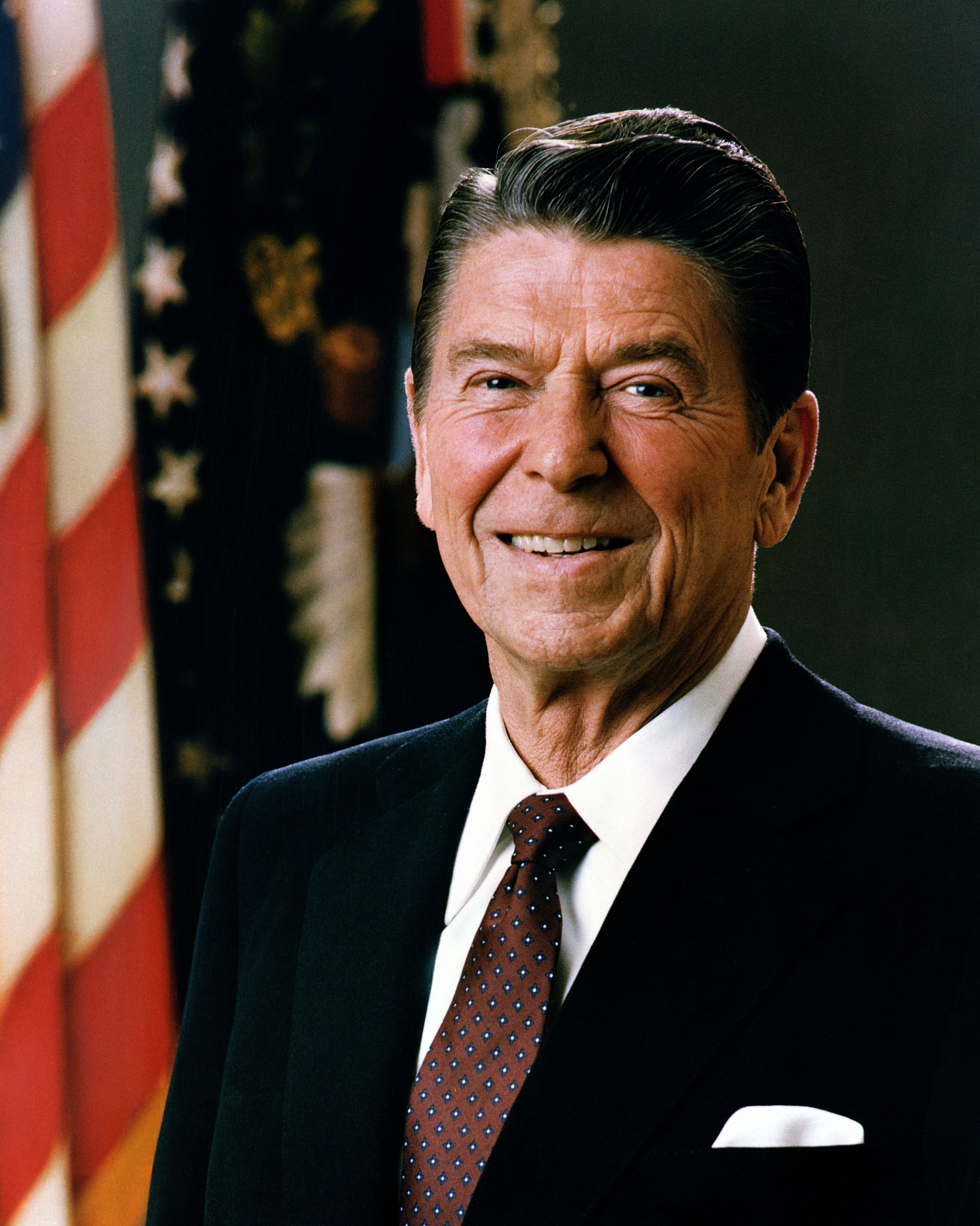
Former United States President Ronald Reagan is referenced multiple times in this episode.

Fedak revealed that the music for the season finale was completed the Wednesday night before the episode aired. The episode's soundtrack includes the songs "Here With Me" by Battleme when Chuck and Sarah are anxious about their wedding, "Conscience Killer" by Black Rebel Motorcycle Club while Chuck intercepts Alexei's transport, "Firewood" by Typhoon while Chuck and Sarah practice their vows, "I'm A Pilot" by Fanfarlo while Chuck rushes to administer the antidote, and "Sinking Friendships" by Jónsi during the wedding.

Multiple references are made to former United States President Ronald Reagan. Upon seeing Casey's framed photograph of Reagan, Hartley asks, "Is he still in charge?", to which Casey replies, "If only!" Casey later comments, "That's smart. Real smart. Reagan smart." Adam Baldwin stated that he established Casey's habit of referencing Reagan on the series. The CIA's Nighthawk motorcycle used in the episode alludes to Street Hawk. During Chuck and Sarah's wedding, Morgan, acting as the minister, claims to be ordained by the Intergalactic Federation of Planets, a reference to Star Trek. When Chuck asks him to close the partition in the limo after the wedding, Morgan responds, "As you wish!", referencing The Princess Bride. In archive footage from "Chuck Versus the Balcony", Sarah tells Chuck that she did not fall in love with James Bond. After Morgan downloads the Intersect, he says "Guys, I know kung fu", a reference to The Matrix. The series has featured variations on this line before, when Chuck downloaded versions of the Intersect in "Chuck Versus the Ring" and "Chuck Versus the Leftovers".

When Sarah asks Chuck what was in the letter from Hartley he responds with "Oh boy!", a reference to the television show Quantum Leap. Quantum Leap featured Scott Bakula who also played Chuck's father Stephen J. Bartowski.

When Clyde Decker video conferences with Chuck at the end of the episode, he says, "I guess this is the start of a new chapter, eh, boy?" Chuck responds with, "I'd watch that boy talk, redneck." This is a reference to Blazing Saddles in which the main character says "I'd watch that boy shit, redneck."

== Reception ==
According to the Nielsen ratings system, "Chuck Versus the Cliffhanger" drew 4.53 million viewers, with a 1.5/4 rating among those aged 18–49. The episode had the most viewers since "Chuck Versus the A-Team", making it the sixth least-watched episode in Chuck's history to that point.

The episode received overwhelmingly positive reviews from critics. Alan Sepinwall of HitFix wrote that "as Chuck began laying out his plan to be freelance spies, and as Morgan took out the Intersect sunglasses General Beckman had so thoughtfully hidden in Chuck's going-away box, all I could feel was gratitude: I'm so glad NBC ordered one more season, because that is a show I want to see!" Sepinwall praised Timothy Dalton's ability to deliver both a comic and serious performance, writing that, while on other series Volkoff's back-story "would be an incredibly dark, tragic storyline", Dalton acted well enough that his emotions were not overwhelming. Sepinwall continued that the storyline "would have sucked every last bit of joy out of the episode" if the character had been portrayed by another Chuck actor. In contrast, Sepinwall wrote that he felt no empathy for Volkoff's daughter, as "Lauren Cohan has never managed to make a cohesive and interesting character out of a bunch of jarring personality shifts". Brody Gibson of Boom Tron wrote," The writers of Chuck sure know how to pull together a great finale. I was floored." Gibson agreed with Sepinwall on Timothy Dalton's range of acting skills, praising Zachary Levi and Yvonne Strahovski as well. Gibson wrote that Levi deserved an Emmy nomination for a scene in which Chuck surrenders himself to Vivian to plead for the antidote to save Sarah's life. Gibson also praised Levi and Strahovski's performance in Chuck and Sarah's "practice wedding": "These two have always had such great chemistry, you could swear they're actually in love and not just actors pretending."

"Let's put it this way. Watching Chuck strip away all aspects of his life for the sole purpose of saving Sarah's life? Fantastic. Watching Chuck and a reformed Hartley Winterbottom talk for 10 minutes in the main hallway of Volkoff Industries without anyone noticing who they were? Semi-excruciating."

— Ryan McGee in his review of the episode for The Onion's A.V. Club

Brittany Frederick of Starpulse.com wrote, "It wasn't the whiz-bang finale I was expecting after all the hype, but it was one that was true to what the show stands for, and that's good enough for me." Like Sepinwall and Gibson, Frederick praised the performance by Levi and Dalton, writing, "Chuck's heartbreak and desperation were incredibly poignant throughout the bulk of the episode." Like Gibson, Frederick also praised the scene depicting Chuck's surrender to Vivian, calling it "sniffle-inducing". Frederick continued that Dalton "plays Hartley Winterbottom with a great sincerity and vulnerability." Frederick also called it "a great reward to the fans that the episode didn't cheat us out of the Chuck/Sarah wedding at all." Frederick wrote, "While I'm not blown away by this finale, I still am satisfied with it, because it represents the values we've come to expect from Chuck: the ideas of hope, family, and sticking together in the face of the most adverse of circumstances." Ryan McGee of The Onion's A.V. Club rated the episode a B+ on an A+ to F scale, although criticizing its "mechanics". Eric Goldman of IGN gave the episode a rating of 9.5 out of 10, a series high alongside season two's "Chuck Versus Santa Claus" and "Chuck Versus the Colonel", season three's "Chuck Versus the Beard" and "Chuck Versus the Subway", and season five's "Chuck Versus the Kept Man" and "Chuck Versus the Goodbye". Goldman wrote, "Chuck's had more ups and downs than usual this season, but it ended on a very strong note. With Sarah's life in danger, Chuck and all his friends and family proved they would risk everything to save her, and it made for a very compelling, involving hour."
