= Alexei Volkoff =

Fictional character on the television series Chuck

- Chuck character
- Timothy Dalton as Alexei Volkoff
- First appearance: "Chuck Versus the First Fight"
- Last appearance: "Chuck Versus the Cliffhanger"
- Portrayed by: Timothy Dalton

In-universe information
- Alias: Gregory Tuttle; Agent X (codename)
- Gender: Male
- Occupation: MI6 scientist International arms dealer: Head of Volkoff Industries
- Affiliation: Volkoff Industries
- Family: Mrs. Winterbottom (mother); Vivian Winterbottom (grandmother)
- Children: Vivian McArthur (daughter)
- Born: Hartley Winterbottom; Somerset, UK

Alexei Volkoff (Russian: Алексей Волков) is the alias and alter ego of Hartley Winterbottom (codename Agent X), a fictional character on the television series Chuck. Volkoff is the head of Volkoff Industries. For the first six episodes of the fourth season, he was an unseen character, directing his operatives from behind the scenes. He first appeared in the seventh episode, "Chuck Versus the First Fight". For the first twenty-one episodes of the season, Volkoff is presented as the character's actual identity. "Chuck Versus Agent X", however, reveals that Volkoff is actually a cover, which, following a botched Intersect upload, Winterbottom unknowingly adopted as his true identity. Volkoff serves as the main antagonist for the first half of season four and tragic character in the second half. He is portrayed by Timothy Dalton.

== Biography ==
Mary Elizabeth Bartowski (codename Frost) was ordered by the CIA to track him down when she was placed undercover in his organization under Project ISIS. It was first revealed in "Chuck Versus the Ring: Part II" and over the course of the first part of the fourth season that Stephen J. Bartowski (codename Orion) had spent the twenty years following Mary's disappearance privately attempting to locate and stop Volkoff.

According to Chuck Bartowski's flash in "Chuck Versus the Cubic Z," Volkoff is 5'10"-6'2" tall and speaks Russian, German, and English. He was born in Moscow, Russia on 30 March or 14 May 1959, was indicted in New York for his involvement in arms trafficking, and is wanted for "conspiracy to kill United States nationals, to murder, to destroy buildings and property of the United States, and to destroy the national defense utilities of the United States."

Volkoff reveals to Dasha that his home address is 17 Tally Place, he has a dog named Kipper, he had his first sexual experience watching Lawrence of Arabia, and he came from a broken home. He later reveals to Devon Woodcomb that he free climbed K2 without oxygen. It is unknown how much (if any) of this is true, though, as he was posing as Frost's MI6 handler both times. Further, the revelation that Volkoff was born Hartley Winterbottom and raised by his mother in Somerset, England, casts doubt on the place of birth given in Chuck's flash.

== Series ==
Volkoff has been present in the series as early as "Chuck Versus the Cougars," when Heather Chandler attempts to extort F-22 plans from her husband for Volkoff. In "Chuck Versus the Cubic Z", Volkoff arranges for her to be on the same prison transfer as Hugo Panzer and hires Panzer to kill her for the failure.

For the first six episodes of the fourth season, Volkoff directed his operatives from behind the scenes. In "Chuck Versus the Anniversary," General Beckman assigned Chuck, Sarah Walker, and John Casey to the same task as Mary. Volkoff first appears in person in "Chuck Versus the First Fight." Chuck meets him masquerading as "Gregory Tuttle," Frost's enthusiastic, if bumbling and completely inexperienced in the matters of field-work, MI6 handler. With Chuck's assistance, "Tuttle" escapes several Volkoff agents and helps Chuck recover data that would clear Mary and prove she has been working deep undercover to bring down his organization. However, after being apparently wounded in a gunfight while recovering the disks, Volkoff follows Chuck, Sarah and Mary to Stephen Bartowski's base of operations and reveals himself, explaining that the entire operation was a plan to locate and destroy Stephen's intelligence. He attempted to kill Chuck and Sarah in the explosion that destroyed Stephen's work, but was unknowingly betrayed by Mary, who left a means for them to escape.

"Chuck Versus the Push Mix" confirms that Stephen and Mary had remained in contact ever since her disappearance when going under cover, and that the final key to Volkoff's defeat was a virus written by Stephen which downloaded the entire Hydra database to a computer at his cabin. Volkoff is subsequently arrested by General Beckman. As Volkoff is taken away, he tells Chuck to have his mother come visit, saying, "It's been fun."

It is revealed in "Chuck Versus the Masquerade" that Volkoff has a daughter named Vivian McArthur, who he has chosen as his successor. Her whole life, Volkoff had been training Vivian for the spy world without her knowledge. Vivian travels to the sealed Volkoff Industries headquarters in Moscow and enters Volkoff's office. It is revealed that the horse paperweight Volkoff used to shatter Yuri the Gobbler's glass eye is also compatible with a locket he gave to Vivian. Vivian connects the locket, unlocking a secret compartment, revealing a card to access Volkoff's bank vault in Macau, containing various pictures of Vivian's life. Vivian is last shown driving away with Volkoff's lawyer Riley to learn the truth. She then hires an agent named Damien to kill Chuck, following in her father's footsteps and effectively becoming Chuck's nemesis.

The CIA orders Vivian assassinated, but Chuck refuses to believe that Vivian would hire Damien. In a meet, Vivian gives Chuck a component of a Volkoff weapon known as the "Norseman". Chuck and Sarah visit Volkoff at River Hill Penitentiary, only to learn that he has begun a path to redemption. In exchange for a meeting with Vivian, Volkoff helps Team Bartowski find the weapon's tracking device and killing agent, along the way apologizing to those he had wronged in the past. When Volkoff panics and nearly gets Chuck and himself killed, Chuck encourages him to return to his old ways. It is then revealed that Vivian had communicated with Volkoff simply by giving Chuck the Norseman, and he goes to rejoin her. However, Vivian refuses to forgive her father or Chuck for their lying and leaves them to die. However, Volkoff saves the team, returning to spiritual ways. Before being returned to prison, Volkoff meets with Mary one last time and reminds her, "Remember, family and friends are everything. Money, greed, and power are a dance with Satan. And he looks like me."

In "Chuck Versus Agent X", Chuck, Ellie, and the rest of the team discover that the CIA and Orion created Volkoff as a cover for Agent X, an English scientist named Hartley Winterbottom and a close friend of Stephen Bartowski. This was part of an early Intersect version implanted into Winterbottom shortly before Chuck was born, but the implant malfunctioned and apparently permanently overwrote Winterbottom's own personality with that of his cover identity. Casey recognizes the danger of what they have learned, and he hides Winterbottom's spy will and the key to protect them from government retribution.

In "Chuck Versus the Cliffhanger", Chuck seeks out Volkoff to help him find a cure for the Norseman, which Vivian used on Sarah. Unfortunately, CIA agent Clyde Decker, who was involved in the coverup of Agent X, anticipated his move and had Volkoff deprogrammed to his original identity as Hartley, who has no recollection of the past thirty years. Nonetheless, he tries to help Chuck by preparing an antidote but it is not strong enough for Sarah. Learning from Mary that Volkoff was developing an improved version of the antidote, he and Chuck went to Volkoff Industries, only for Hartley to get cold feet and run away. He later came back and talked down Vivian from killing Chuck. It is also revealed that he volunteered to go undercover and convinced Stephen to use his Intersect program on him. He and Vivian then start new lives with flawless IDs provided by Casey. He also sends Chuck and Sarah all the controlling interest shares to Volkoff Industries, allowing them to purchase the Buy More and start a freelance spy operation.

== Development ==
It was announced in October 2010 that actor Timothy Dalton (famous for the role of James Bond in The Living Daylights and Licence to Kill) was cast in a recurring role as Mary's MI6 handler, Tuttle, who has a connection to Mary in the past. Series co-creator Josh Schwartz told Entertainment Weekly, "It's not the kind of character you'd [expect] him to play. There's nothing suave or debonair about him."

The reveal of Volkoff's true identity was highly praised. Eric Goldman of IGN has praised Dalton's performance, writing that he "continues to shine as Volkoff. The mixture of menace and humor he brings is perfect." Goldman asked, "How can you not share the delight of a villain who boasts that his boat has state of the art weaponry and security, 'and an old-fashioned ice cream parlor!' The fact that he was later seen having a menacing conversation, while eating ice cream, only added to that epicness."

== Personality ==
In his first appearance, he claimed to be able to kill a man with a plastic fork. When threatened with torture by Dasha, he instantly reveals several irrelevant details about his life.

It is later revealed that Alexei loves Mary and will go to great lengths to protect her. However, he would rather kill Mary than let her live without him. When holding people at gunpoint, Volkoff cocks the hammer of his semi-automatic pistol, an action unnecessary due to recoil operation, simply because he likes the sound.

Volkoff reveals to Sarah that he is a romantic who appreciates "paintings, poetry, the art of massage." He later gleefully discusses Yuri the Gobbler by saying, "Don't ask why he's called that... It's because he eats people!" In the same episode, he expresses his disappointment before shooting Yuri in the head without hesitation. In "Chuck Versus the Push Mix", Volkoff reveals that the password to unlock Hydra is "Death is the solution to all problems," a quote from his "favorite poet and humanitarian, Joseph Stalin."

Although Volkoff claims to be loved by children, the longest he ever saw his own daughter was ten minutes, with years between each meeting. Volkoff's customary greeting is a kiss to both cheeks and, in Chuck's case, the lips.

"Chuck Versus the Family Volkoff" saw a drastic change in Volkoff's personality, as counseling sessions in prison have led him to regret the way he has lived his life. To prove that he is a changed man, he takes every opportunity to apologize to those he has wronged in the past. He is shown to play chess, nearly getting himself and Chuck killed when he panics after being checked in a computer chess game. It suddenly dawns upon him that he does not want to die. After encouragement by Chuck to return to his old ways, Volkoff is shown to have led the automated player into a trap, paralleling the way he has manipulated Team Bartowski throughout the episode. When his daughter leaves him to die for lying to her, however, Volkoff appears to have genuinely changed.

It is first revealed in "Chuck Versus Agent X" that Alexei Volkoff is actually a constructed identity. As Agent X, Volkoff possesses two distinct personalities: the dangerous arms dealer and his true, long lost personality as the gentle scientist with a dislike for guns, Hartley Winterbottom.
