= Chuck season 5 =

Chuck
- Season 5
- DVD box cover
- No. of episodes: 13

Release
- Original network: NBC
- Original release: October 28, 2011 – January 27, 2012

Season chronology
- ← Previous; Season 4

The fifth and final season of the American action-comedy television series Chuck was announced on May 13, 2011. It included 13 episodes, which premiered on October 28, 2011, and concluded on January 27, 2012, with a two-hour finale.

Continuing from the eponymous cliffhanger ending of the fourth season finale, "Chuck Versus the Cliffhanger", the fifth season featured the series returning to its roots. With their new-found wealth, Chuck (Zachary Levi) and Sarah Bartowski (Yvonne Strahovski) own the fictional big-box store Buy More, as well as their new freelance spy organization, Carmichael Industries, which includes John Casey (Adam Baldwin) and Morgan Grimes (Joshua Gomez). Meanwhile, Morgan acts as the human possessor of the government database known as the Intersect, and Chuck is forced to act as Morgan's protector in the same way that Sarah and Casey were to Chuck in past seasons.

== Production ==
Series co-creators Josh Schwartz and Chris Fedak expressed a desire to produce a fifth season of Chuck as early as March 2011, when it was revealed that the fourth season finale would be titled "Chuck Versus the Cliffhanger". Fedak later confirmed that the episode, as the title suggests, would have a cliffhanger ending leading into the fifth season. Despite a notable decline in viewership, the series was renewed for a fifth and final season of 13 episodes on May 13, 2011. The season was scheduled to premiere October 21, 2011 and mark the transition of the series' timeslot from Monday nights to Friday nights at 8/7c, before being rescheduled to one week later, October 28. It was announced on September 8, 2011, that series star Zachary Levi would direct the fifth episode of the season. Levi had previously directed an episode each in the third and fourth seasons.

== Cast ==
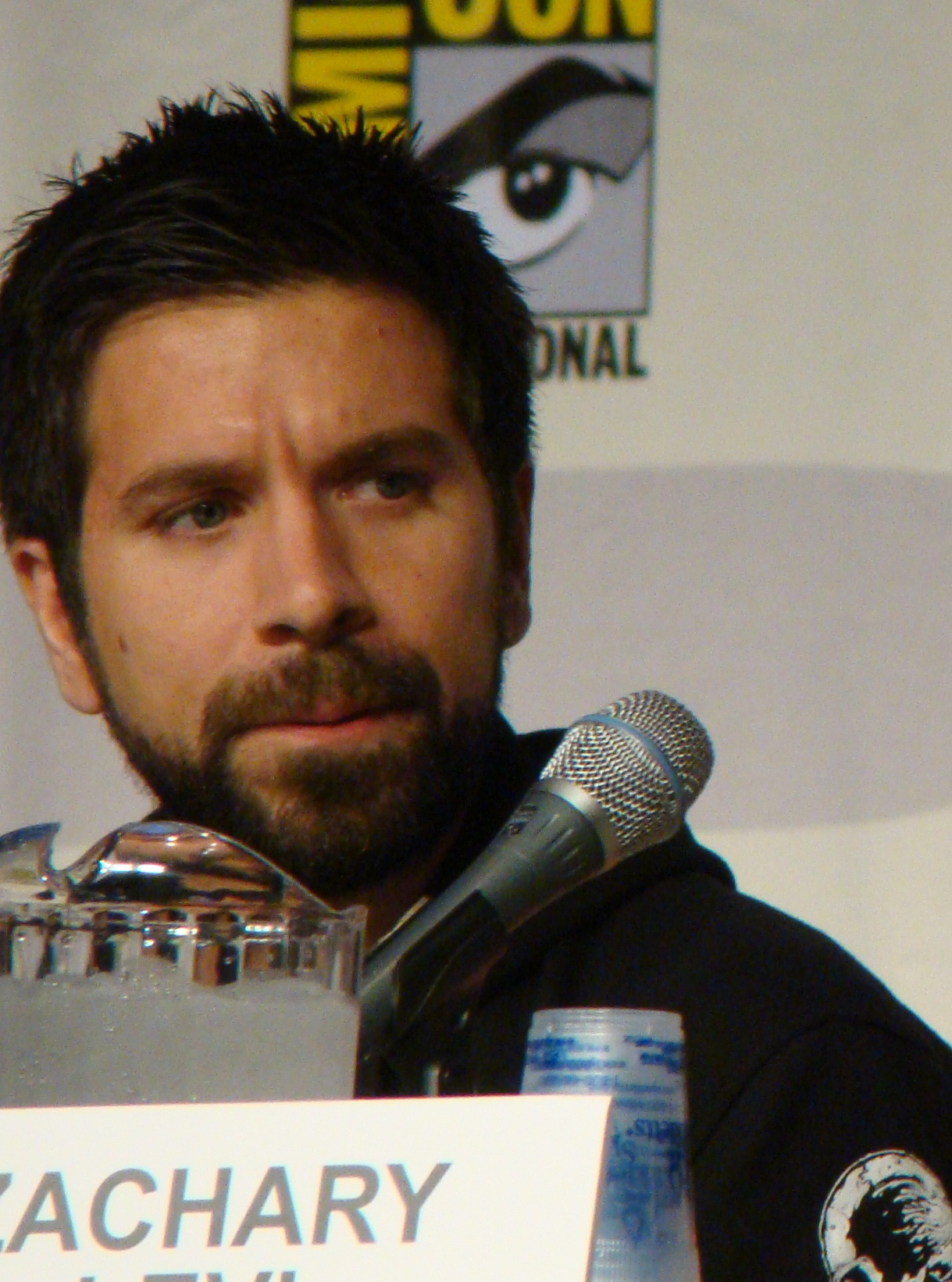
Morgan Grimes, who is portrayed by Joshua Gomez (pictured), had new importance as the human Intersect in this season.

Series stars Zachary Levi, Yvonne Strahovski, and Adam Baldwin all expressed an interest to reprise their roles of former Special Agents Charles "Chuck" and Sarah Bartowski, and Colonel John Casey, and an interview with Ryan McPartlin about the future of the series suggested he would also return as Dr. Devon "Captain Awesome" Woodcomb. Chris Fedak later confirmed that Joshua Gomez would reprise his role of Morgan Grimes. The big-box store Buy More, which Chuck purchased in the fourth-season finale, is also featured in the fifth season, with Mark Christopher Lawrence, Scott Krinsky, and Vik Sahay reprising their roles as Michael "Big Mike" Tucker, Jeffrey "Jeff" Barnes, and Lester Patel, respectively. It was confirmed at the 2011 San Diego Comic-Con that Sarah Lancaster would also reprise her role as Dr. Eleanor "Ellie" Bartowski Woodcomb.

John Casey was given a romantic interest in Gertrude Verbanski, the head of Carmichael Industries' biggest spy competition, Verbanski Corp., said by Fedak to be "the best spy company in the world". It was later announced that The Matrix actress Carrie-Anne Moss would play Verbanski. At Comic-Con, Fedak revealed his desire for Linda Hamilton to return as Mary Elizabeth Bartowski. It was later confirmed that she would appear in the final episode. Brandon Routh returned to the series as Daniel Shaw, a villain that the team had previously defeated. Angus Macfadyen appeared in the final four episodes as the series' final recurring villain, Nicholas Quinn. Other recurring cast members include Bonita Friedericy as Brigadier General Diane Beckman, the head of the NSA and an ally to Carmichael Industries, Mekenna Melvin as Alex McHugh, Casey's daughter and Morgan's girlfriend, and Richard Burgi as Clyde Decker, a CIA agent involved in a rogue operation to take down Chuck.

It was confirmed at the Comic-Con panel that Star Wars actor Mark Hamill would play a villain in the fifth-season premiere. Comedian Craig Kilborn also appeared in the season premiere as Roger Bale, a dangerous man who steals money from other dangerous villains. Lost's Jeff Fahey and Smallville's Justin Hartley guest starred in the season's second episode, as Karl Sneijder, "the president and CEO of diamond giant Natal Jewelers," and his kidnapped brother Wesley, respectively. The fourth episode featured The Office's David Koechner and The Shield's Catherine Dent as Crazy Bob, "a jolly Buy More manager," and Jane Robertson, another Buy More manager and "a close friend of Bob's," respectively. The two cross paths with Chuck and Sarah at the company’s Employee of the Year Convention. The fifth episode featured cameo appearances by Community's Danny Pudi and Yvette Nicole Brown. The sixth episode featured Rebecca Romijn as Robyn Cunnings, a cold, cunning CIA agent known for her abrasive interrogation technique who is a member of a rogue group which tries to frame Chuck. Stan Lee portrayed himself in the seventh episode, encountering Chuck "in the most unexpected of places." The eighth episode featured Cheryl Ladd as Emma, Sarah's mother, and Tim DeKay as Kieran Ryker, Sarah's former handler. The tenth episode featured Bo Derek as herself. Mark Pellegrino returned in the final episode as a FULCRUM agent. Fedak has stated that the writers intended to include various guest stars from past episodes in cameo appearances in the finale, but that it was not possible to include them all.

== Cast and characters ==
=== Main cast ===
- Zachary Levi as Agent Chuck Bartowski (13 episodes)
- Yvonne Strahovski as Agent Sarah Walker (13 episodes)
- Joshua Gomez as Morgan Grimes (13 episodes)
- Ryan McPartlin as Dr. Devon Woodcomb (10 episodes)
- Mark Christopher Lawrence as Michael "Big Mike" Tucker (9 episodes)
- Scott Krinsky as Jeffrey Barnes (11 episodes)
- Vik Sahay as Lester Patel (11 episodes)
- Sarah Lancaster as Dr. Ellie Woodcomb (10 episodes)
- Adam Baldwin as Colonel John Casey (13 episodes)

=== Supporting cast ===
- Mekenna Melvin as Alex McHugh (9 episodes)
- Bonita Friedericy as Brigadier General Diane Beckman (7 episodes)
- Carrie-Anne Moss as Gertrude Verbanski (4 episodes)
- Angus Macfadyen as Nicholas Quinn (4 episodes)
- Richard Burgi as CIA Agent Clyde Decker (3 episodes)
- Brandon Routh as Daniel Shaw (1 episode)
- Linda Hamilton as Mary Elizabeth Bartowski (1 episode)
- Bo Derek as Bo Derek (1 episode)

== Episodes ==
No. overall	No. in season	Title	Directed by	Written by	Original release date	Prod. code	US viewers (millions)
79	1	"Chuck Versus the Zoom"	Robert Duncan McNeill	Chris Fedak & Nicholas Wootton	October 28, 2011	3X6751	3.42
After Carmichael Industries' first mission–to recover a stolen vase from a vicious thief (Mark Hamill)–goes slightly awry, Chuck and the team go up against Roger Bale (Craig Kilborn), a man who steals secrets from other villains. Meanwhile, Chuck attempts to buy a new house for Sarah, and Decker (Richard Burgi) continues to hunt the team.
80	2	"Chuck Versus the Bearded Bandit"	Patrick Norris	Lauren LeFranc & Rafe Judkins	November 4, 2011	3X6752	3.08
Chuck and the team take the case of a man (Jeff Fahey) whose brother (Justin Hartley) has been kidnapped, but soon realize that things may not exactly be as they seem. Meanwhile, Gertrude Verbanski (Carrie-Anne Moss), a rival spy, attempts to woo Sarah away from Carmichael Industries.
81	3	"Chuck Versus the Frosted Tips"	Paul Marks	Phil Klemmer	November 11, 2011	3X6753	3.13
Carmichael Industries attempts to track down a wanted fugitive while Casey reunites once again with Verbanski (Carrie-Anne Moss). Captain Awesome begins paternity leave with Baby Clara and, when it’s not quite as exciting as he expected, he is led to the Buy More.
82	4	"Chuck Versus the Business Trip"	Allan Kroeker	Kristin Newman	November 18, 2011	3X6754	3.11
At the Buy More Employee of the Year Convention, Chuck and Sarah cross paths with two Buy More managers (David Koechner and Catherine Dent). Meanwhile, Chuck pretends to be Morgan in order to catch an assassin code-named Viper tasked with destroying the new Intersect.
83	5	"Chuck Versus the Hack Off"	Zachary Levi	Craig DiGregorio	December 9, 2011	3X6755	3.66
The team must turn to Verbanski (Carrie-Anne Moss) when they need help tracking a virus, forcing Casey to confront her once again. Meanwhile, Lester and Jeff's relationship is threatened by the arrival of a new employee (Danny Pudi) at the Buy More. Chuck revisits his past as a computer hacker.
84	6	"Chuck Versus the Curse"	Michael Schultz	Alex Katsnelson	December 16, 2011	3X6756	3.22
Chuck is framed for the crime of the century by a group of rogue CIA agents. One such agent is the cold and calculating Robin Cunnings (Rebecca Romijn), who is widely known for her torture techniques. Ellie and Awesome go on a date that quickly turns into a night full of action after a case of mistaken-identity.
85	7	"Chuck Versus the Santa Suit"	Peter Lauer	Amanda Kate Shuman	December 23, 2011	3X6757	3.42
Chuck and Sarah discover that the identity of the person trying to take down Carmichael Industries is Daniel Shaw (Brandon Routh). He escapes from prison, kidnaps Sarah, and holds her hostage in Castle in order to force Chuck to steal the Intersect 3.0 from the CIA. Chuck must face Shaw alone without the aid of the intersect.
86	8	"Chuck Versus the Baby"	Matt Barber	Rafe Judkins & Lauren LeFranc	December 30, 2011	3X6758	3.18
A chilling message from Shaw forces Sarah to revisit her past in Budapest when she fears her original handler (Tim DeKay) will try to harm her mother (Cheryl Ladd).
87	9	"Chuck Versus the Kept Man"	Fred Toye	Craig DiGregorio & Phil Klemmer	January 6, 2012	3X6759	3.26
Chuck and Sarah try to determine the future of Carmichael Industries. Verbanski hires Casey and the team to go on a mission in South Beach. After an armament deal goes astray, can Carmichael Industries save their client? Jeff and Lester investigate an irregularity at the Buy More.
88	10	"Chuck Versus Bo"	Jeremiah Chechik	Kristin Newman	January 13, 2012	3X6760	3.17
Morgan's intersect past causes Chuck and team run into Bo Derek on their final mission in Vail before leaving the spy business. However, former CIA agent Nicholas Quinn (Angus Macfadyen) has other plans. Jeff and Lester continue their investigation at the Buy More. Quinn captures Chuck and set a trap for Sarah and Casey.
89	11	"Chuck Versus the Bullet Train"	Buzz Feitshans IV	Nicholas Wootton	January 20, 2012	3X6761	3.84
Quinn smuggles the captured Chuck on a bullet train Japan. Sarah risks her life by using the defective Intersect to aide Casey in the rescue mission. Back at the Buy More, Quinn's agents take Alex hostage. When Morgan and Devon's own rescue efforts have no effect, Casey has no choice but to allow Jeff and Lester to help.
90	12	"Chuck Versus Sarah"	Jay Chandrasekhar	Rafe Judkins & Lauren LeFranc	January 27, 2012	3X6762	4.10
Sarah's excessive use of the defective Intersect has erased parts of her memory, allowing Quinn to turn her against Chuck. She returns to Chuck and Casey in time to hear Chuck declare that the Intersect must be destroyed. By the time Sarah goes rogue and strands the team inside Government building, Chuck has caught on, and has secretly switched glasses. He and Casey now labor to restore Sarah's memories of Chuck, with a trip to their dream house, and backup of Sarah's video log.
91	13	"Chuck Versus the Goodbye"	Robert Duncan McNeill	Chris Fedak	January 27, 2012	3X6763	4.31
Chuck's friends and family band together to take down Quinn. Sarah realizes that Chuck was telling the truth about their relationship, but leaves to find Quinn and take revenge from him, as she can't remember any of her feelings for Chuck. Two weeks later when Sarah returns to ask Chuck's help in tracking down Quinn, Chuck offers his services for a final mission to take down Quinn and recover the final pieces of the remaining Intersect. Ellie informs Chuck that the Intersect can be used to reprogram Sarah's memories. Sarah and Chuck soon discover that General Beckman has the final key for the Intersect, but Quinn beats them there and plants a bomb under General Beckman's chair that will detonate if Beckman leaves her chair or the music ends. As soon as the last note of Antonín Dvořák's Symphony No. 9 fades away, Jeffster! plays A-ha's "Take On Me", while Morgan conducts the orchestra to play along. Sarah apprehends Quinn and kills him, recovering the Intersect. However, Chuck has no choice but to upload the Intersect to open a case which contains the bomb. In the process, Sarah remembers that a pornographic computer virus can be used to destroy the computer and stop the bomb, as it did in the pilot episode. After the final mission, the gang says its goodbyes. Beckman says her offer to them about rejoining the agency is open if they ever want to save the world again. Casey hugs Chuck goodbye and leaves. Sarah also tells Chuck that she is leaving to find herself and needs time to think and be alone to decide about starting over. At the Buy More, Jeff and Lester describe the previous night's events to Big Mike, who is skeptical until a German record producer arrives to offer a recording deal with Jeffster!, which they accept. Casey tells Alex and Morgan that he is leaving to be with Verbanski. Alex and Morgan tell Casey that they are moving in together, which he approves of by giving them the keys to his apartment. Ellie and Awesome pack up their belongings for their move to Chicago, as Chuck reassures them. He leaves dejectedly, before Morgan gives him a pep talk to pursue the girl of his dreams and follow his heart. His instincts take him to the beach where he met Sarah at the end of his first mission. Sarah recognizes the place is important but is unable to remember the details to which Chuck tells her that this is the place where she asked him to trust her after their first mission and asks Sarah to do the same. He urges Sarah to trust him and no matter what she decides he would always be there for her. Sarah finally opens up to Chuck and asks him to tell their story, and he does in flashbacks. Finally, Chuck mentions Morgan's theory that a kiss will bring back Sarah's memories. Sarah looks back at him and even though Chuck isn't sure about Morgan's theory she interrupts him from saying anything else and asks Chuck to kiss her which he does. As they continue kissing, the scene fades back into black, which marks the end of the series.

== Home media release ==
Chuck: The Complete Fifth Season
Set details			Special features
13 Episodes; 3-Disc Set; English; Subtitles: English, Spanish, French			Sandwiches and Superfans: The Saving of a Show: A tribute to the World's Greatest Fans; Chuck Versus the Final Episode: An Emotional Visit Behind the Scenes; Scoring the World of Chuck: The Mind Behind the Music; Chuck: The Beginnings: The Flash That Launched a Hit Show; Chuck: Through the Years: The Journey from Nerd to Spy; Goodbye, Buy More: Time-Lapse Teardown of the Set; Exclusive Buy More Commercials; Extended Version of Series Finale; Chuck: The Future: Cast and Producers' Predictions; Audio commentaries on "Chuck Versus Sarah" and "Chuck Versus the Goodbye" by Zachary Levi, Joshua Gomez, Josh Schwartz and Chris Fedak; Declassified Scenes; Gag Reel
Release dates
United States; Canada	United Kingdom	Australia; New Zealand	Japan
May 8, 2012	October 15, 2012	August 8, 2012	TBA
