= Chuck season 4 =

Chuck
- Season 4
- No. of episodes: 24

Release
- Original network: NBC
- Original release: September 20, 2010 – May 16, 2011

Season chronology
- ← Previous; Season 3 Next → Season 5

The fourth season of Chuck was announced on May 13, 2010. Having initially ordered 13 episodes, NBC ordered an additional 11 on October 19, 2010 for a total of 24 episodes. Throughout the season, Chuck faced individual villains: Alexei Volkoff, head of Volkoff Industries, and Volkoff's daughter, Vivian McArthur.

Josh Schwartz and Chris Fedak expressed a desire to continue the series past the fourth season as early as March 2011, when it was announced that the season finale would be titled "Chuck Versus the Cliffhanger". The episode, as the title suggests, had a cliffhanger ending leading into the fifth and final season, which was ordered on May 13, 2011.

== Cast and characters ==
=== Main cast ===
- Zachary Levi as Agent Chuck Bartowski (24 episodes)
- Yvonne Strahovski as Agent Sarah Walker (24 episodes)
- Adam Baldwin as Colonel John Casey (24 episodes)
- Joshua Gomez as Morgan Grimes (24 episodes)
- Ryan McPartlin as Dr. Devon Woodcomb (18 episodes)
- Mark Christopher Lawrence as Michael "Big Mike" Tucker (16 episodes)
- Scott Krinsky as Jeffrey Barnes (18 episodes)
- Vik Sahay as Lester Patel (18 episodes)
- Bonita Friedericy as Diane Beckman (21 episodes)
- Sarah Lancaster as Dr. Ellie Woodcomb (21 episodes)

=== Supporting cast ===
- Mekenna Melvin as Alex McHugh (12 episodes)
- Linda Hamilton as Mary Elizabeth Bartowski (11 episodes)
- Timothy Dalton as Alexei Volkoff (6 episodes)
- Olivia Munn, Isaiah Mustafa, Stacy Keibler, and Summer Glau as "Greta" (5 episodes)
- Lauren Cohan as Vivian McArthur (5 episodes)
- Robin Givens as Jane Bentley (3 episodes)
- Ray Wise as Riley (3 episodes)
- Richard Chamberlain as The Belgian (2 episodes)
- Mini Anden as Carina Miller (2 episodes)

== Episodes ==
No. overall	No. in season	Title	Directed by	Written by	Original release date	Prod. code	US viewers (millions)
55	1	"Chuck Versus the Anniversary"	Robert Duncan McNeill	Chris Fedak	September 20, 2010	3X6301	5.79
When the CIA gains control over the Buy More, Chuck begins searching for his mother Mary (Linda Hamilton). Sarah and Casey follow a trail to Russia as they investigate the mysterious Volkoff Industries and its operative, Marco (Dolph Lundgren). Back at home, Ellie delivers big news to her family. Olivia Munn appears as the inaugural Greta, a rotating character.
56	2	"Chuck Versus the Suitcase"	Gail Mancuso	Rafe Judkins & Lauren LeFranc	September 27, 2010	3X6302	5.37
There are crimes of fashion when Chuck and Sarah go undercover in Milan for Fashion Week to seize a high-tech weapon, yet Chuck soon recognizes a flaw in his relationship with Sarah. Meanwhile, Morgan discovers a vulnerability about the new Buy More. Also guest starring Lou Ferrigno, Karolina Kurkova as Sofia Stepanova, Isaiah Mustafa as Greta, and Bronson Pinchot.
57	3	"Chuck Versus the Cubic Z"	Norman Buckley	Nicholas Wootton	October 4, 2010	3X6303	5.38
A prison transfer delivers old foes, Heather Chandler and Hugo Panzer (Nicole Richie and "Stone Cold" Steve Austin), to Castle, canceling Chuck and Sarah’s romantic mission. But Chuck grows more interested when the manipulative Heather claims to know a secret about Frost. Meanwhile, as Morgan prepares the Buy More for a huge video game release, he gets a surprise from Big Mike. Guest star Stacy Keibler as Greta.
58	4	"Chuck Versus the Coup d'Etat"	Robert Duncan McNeill	Kristin Newman	October 11, 2010	3X6304	5.33
Indebted to Devon for saving his life in "Chuck Versus the Angel de la Muerte", Premier Alejandro Goya (Armand Assante) shows his gratitude by inviting the gang to his beautiful island. Chuck and Sarah work on becoming better communicators as they join Devon and Ellie for a getaway to Costa Gravas. However, Goya's wife (Tia Texada) has other plans. Back at home, Morgan embarks on a forbidden romance that may put him at odds with Colonel John Casey.
59	5	"Chuck Versus the Couch Lock"	Michael Schultz	Henry Alonso Myers	October 18, 2010	3X6305	5.23
When Casey's Clinton-era team (Dave Bautista, Eric Roberts and Joel David Moore) returns looking for him, Chuck must decide what he's willing to sacrifice in order to find his mother. Elsewhere, Morgan works up the nerve to reveal a potentially dangerous secret to Casey.
60	6	"Chuck Versus the Aisle of Terror"	John Scott	Craig DiGregorio	October 25, 2010	3X6306	5.45
Team Bartowski battles sinister scientist Dr. Stanley Wheelwright (Robert Englund) who is plotting to sell a toxin that induces nightmares. Meanwhile, the true allegiances of Mary Bartowski come under scrutiny, and the Buy More gang celebrates Halloween.
61	7	"Chuck Versus the First Fight"	Allan Kroeker	Rafe Judkins & Lauren LeFranc	November 1, 2010	3X6307	5.47
After a falling out with Sarah after she arrested Mary, Chuck embarks on a rogue mission with his mother's MI-6 handler Gregory Tuttle, who is revealed to be Volkoff himself (Timothy Dalton). In their attempt to prove Mary Bartowski's innocence, they are attacked by Dasha (Ana Gasteyer), a nefarious Volkoff operative. Meanwhile, Ellie digs into her family's secretive past.
62	8	"Chuck Versus the Fear of Death"	Robert Duncan McNeill	Nicholas Wootton	November 15, 2010	3X6308	5.43
Worried his spy career is souring, Chuck aims to recover the intersect by attempting a dangerous mission with the help of Agent Jim Rye (Rob Riggle) to retrieve a diamond being sold by Adelbert de Smet a.k.a. "The Belgian" (Richard Chamberlain). Meanwhile, Casey and Morgan try to protect Jeff and Lester from the truth when they snoop around to find out the true identity of Greta (Summer Glau).
63	9	"Chuck Versus Phase Three"	Anton Cropper	Kristin Newman	November 22, 2010	3X6309	4.80
In order to hunt down the Belgian (Richard Chamberlain), who has kidnapped Chuck to get him to flash so he can take the Intersect, Sarah, Morgan and Casey immerse themselves in the jungles of Southeast Asia. Meanwhile, Ellie and Devon dive into the secret Stephen Bartowski left behind.
64	10	"Chuck Versus the Leftovers"	Zachary Levi	Henry Alonso Myers	November 29, 2010	3X6310	6.17
Chuck's mom comes over with Alexei Volkoff for "Thanksgiving leftovers" dinner the day after the holiday bringing complications along with her. Morgan and the rest of the Buy More crew deal with the busiest shopping day of the year. Ellie discovers more family clues in the meantime.
65	11	"Chuck Versus the Balcony"	Jay Chandrasekhar	Max Denby	January 17, 2011	3X6311	5.97
Chuck struggles with the escalation of his relationship with Sarah. Meanwhile, they are sent on an impromptu spy mission to France to recover a lost nano-chip. Lester asks Big Mike for relationship advice, and Morgan attempts to help Chuck propose to Sarah, who has a secret of her own.
66	12	"Chuck Versus the Gobbler"	Milan Cheylov	Craig DiGregorio	January 24, 2011	3X6312	6.06
Sarah goes undercover with Volkoff Industries hoping to free Chuck's mother. To do so, Sarah is helped by Team Bartowski to break Yuri the Gobbler (Matthew Willig) out of prison. Sarah is told she must prove her loyalty by killing Casey. Devon and Ellie discuss names for their baby.
67	13	"Chuck Versus the Push Mix"	Peter Lauer	Rafe Judkins & Lauren LeFranc	January 31, 2011	3X6313	5.57
While Sarah is away trying to save Chuck's mother, Chuck and Morgan plot to take down Volkoff while Casey starts to bond with Alex. Ellie is rushed to hospital for the birth of her baby.
68	14	"Chuck Versus the Seduction Impossible"	Patrick Norris	Chris Fedak & Kristin Newman	February 7, 2011	3X6314	5.41
Chuck, Sarah and Casey are sent to Morocco to rescue old friend Roan Montgomery (John Larroquette), while Morgan meets Alex's mother (Clare Carey) and Mary tries to reconnect with her family.
69	15	"Chuck Versus the Cat Squad"	Paul Marks	Nicholas Wootton	February 14, 2011	3X6315	5.47
As a surprise, Chuck reunites Sarah with her old spy team The C.A.T. Squad including Carina Miller (Mini Anden). The squad flies to Rio de Janeiro to face off against their nemesis Augusto Gaez (Lou Diamond Phillips), however old grudges start to get in the way of the mission. Elsewhere, Morgan and Alex's relationship is threatened by Carina's return.
70	16	"Chuck Versus the Masquerade"	Patrick Norris	Rafe Judkins & Lauren LeFranc	February 21, 2011	3X6316	5.48
Valentine's day is ruined when the team is dispatched to protect heiress Vivian McArthur (Lauren Cohan). Casey is tempted by an offer from Jane Bentley (Robin Givens) and Morgan makes a big decision.
71	17	"Chuck Versus the First Bank of Evil"	Frederick E.O. Toye	Henry Alonso Myers & Craig DiGregorio	February 28, 2011	3X6317	5.35
Chuck encourages Vivian McArthur (Lauren Cohan) to get in touch with her inner villain for a mission; Morgan Grimes' search for a new roommate has unexpected results.
72	18	"Chuck Versus the A-Team"	Kevin Mock	Phil Klemmer	March 14, 2011	3X6318	4.92
When a new team starts operating from Castle, Chuck and Sarah wonder if they're being phased out.
73	19	"Chuck Versus the Muuurder"	Allan Kroeker	Alex Katsnelson & Kristin Newman	March 21, 2011	3X6319	4.23
Four potential CIA agents are brought to Castle to determine who's going to be the new Intersect. Chuck must solve the mystery when the potential candidates start turning up dead. Meanwhile, the Buy More crew try saving Big Mike from Large Mart.
74	20	"Chuck Versus the Family Volkoff"	Robert Duncan McNeill	Amanda Kate Shuman & Nicholas Wootton	April 11, 2011	3X6320	4.03
When the CIA orders Vivian assassinated, Chuck must put his trust in a dangerous ally – Vivian's father Alexei. Meanwhile, Ellie suspects that her mother is interfering with the search into her father's past.
75	21	"Chuck Versus the Wedding Planner"	Anton Cropper	Rafe Judkins & Lauren LeFranc	April 18, 2011	3X6321	4.22
When Chuck and Sarah get conned out of their wedding money, they turn to Sarah's conman father, Jack Burton (Gary Cole), for help. Meanwhile, Morgan pressures Casey to face Alex's mother.
76	22	"Chuck Versus Agent X"	Robert Duncan McNeill	Phil Klemmer & Craig DiGregorio	May 2, 2011	3X6322	4.10
Chuck's bachelor party turns up some uninvited guests; Ellie makes a life-changing discovery while investigating her father's computer.
77	23	"Chuck Versus the Last Details"	Peter Lauer	Henry Alonso Myers & Kristin Newman	May 9, 2011	3X6323	4.10
Chuck and Sarah's wedding prep includes one final detail: ensuring that the mother-of-the-groom makes it to the ceremony alive. Meanwhile, Morgan's responsibilities as Best Man include his most dangerous mission yet, as he faces Vivian Volkoff. Elsewhere, Ellie tends to the last details of the rehearsal dinner and seeks help from an unlikely source.
78	24	"Chuck Versus the Cliffhanger"	Robert Duncan McNeil	Chris Fedak & Nicholas Wootton	May 16, 2011	3X6324	4.53
Before he can kiss the bride, Chuck puts everything on the line in order to save Sarah, including his own life.

== Reception ==
=== US Nielsen ratings ===
Episode #	Episode	Date	Viewers (millions)	18–49 Rating	18–49 Share	Note
1	"Chuck Versus the Anniversary"	September 20, 2010	5.7	2.0	6	
2	"Chuck Versus the Suitcase"	September 27, 2010	5.3	2.0	5	
3	"Chuck Versus the Cubic Z"	October 4, 2010	5.3	1.9	5	
4	"Chuck Versus the Coup d'Etat"	October 11, 2010	5.3	1.9	5	
5	"Chuck Versus the Couch Lock"	October 18, 2010	5.2	1.9	5	
6	"Chuck Versus the Aisle of Terror"	October 25, 2010	5.4	1.9	5	
7	"Chuck Versus the First Fight"	November 1, 2010	5.4	2.0	5	
8	"Chuck Versus the Fear of Death"	November 15, 2010	5.4	1.8	5	
9	"Chuck Versus Phase Three"	November 22, 2010	4.8	1.7	5	
10	"Chuck Versus the Leftovers"	November 29, 2010	6.1	2.0	6	
11	"Chuck Versus the Balcony"	January 17, 2011	5.9	2.1	5	
12	"Chuck Versus the Gobbler"	January 24, 2011	6.0	1.9	5	
13	"Chuck Versus the Push Mix"	January 31, 2011	5.5	1.7	5	
14	"Chuck Versus the Seduction Impossible"	February 7, 2011	5.4	1.7	5	
15	"Chuck Versus the Cat Squad"	February 14, 2011	5.5	1.7	5	
16	"Chuck Versus the Masquerade"	February 21, 2011	5.5	1.7	4	
17	"Chuck Versus the First Bank of Evil"	February 28, 2011	5.3	1.7	5	
18	"Chuck Versus the A-Team"	March 14, 2011	4.9	1.6	5	
19	"Chuck Versus the Muuurder"	March 21, 2011	4.2	1.5	4	
20	"Chuck Versus the Family Volkoff"	April 11, 2011	4.0	1.3	4	
21	"Chuck Versus the Wedding Planner"	April 18, 2011	4.2	1.3	4	
22	"Chuck Versus Agent X"	May 2, 2011	4.1	1.4	4	
23	"Chuck Versus the Last Details"	May 9, 2011	4.1	1.4	4	
24	"Chuck Versus the Cliffhanger"	May 16, 2011	4.5	1.5	4	

=== UK BARB ratings ===
#	Episode	UK air date	Living TV viewers (thousand)	Living TV rank (weekly)	Living TV +1 viewers (thousand)	Living TV +1 rank (weekly)
1	"Chuck Versus the Anniversary"	October 14, 2010	259	5	—N/a	—N/a
2	"Chuck Versus the Suitcase"	October 21, 2010	222	6	—N/a	—N/a
3	"Chuck Versus the Cubic Z"	October 28, 2010	199	6	—N/a	—N/a
4	"Chuck Versus the Coup d'Etat"	November 4, 2010	152	8	—N/a	—N/a
5	"Chuck Versus the Couch Lock"	November 11, 2010	169	10	—N/a	—N/a
6	"Chuck Versus the Aisle of Terror"	November 18, 2010	—N/a	—N/a	—N/a	—N/a
7	"Chuck Versus the First Fight"	November 25, 2010	133	9	79	9
8	"Chuck Versus the Fear of Death"	December 2, 2010	160	5	—N/a	—N/a
9	"Chuck Versus Phase Three"	December 9, 2010	197	4	—N/a	—N/a
10	"Chuck Versus the Leftovers"	December 16, 2010	178	7	95	8
11	"Chuck Versus the Balcony"	March 31, 2011	192	9	—N/a	—N/a
12	"Chuck Versus the Gobbler"	April 7, 2011	180	10	—N/a	—N/a
13	"Chuck Versus the Push Mix"	April 14, 2011	—N/a	—N/a	—N/a	—N/a
14	"Chuck Versus the Seduction Impossible"	April 21, 2011	238	9	—N/a	—N/a
15	"Chuck Versus the Cat Squad"	April 28, 2011	183	8	—N/a	—N/a
16	"Chuck Versus the Masquerade"	May 5, 2011	—N/a	—N/a	—N/a	—N/a
17	"Chuck Versus the First Bank of Evil"	May 12, 2011	—N/a	—N/a	—N/a	—N/a
18	"Chuck Versus the A-Team"	May 19, 2011	—N/a	—N/a	—N/a	—N/a
19	"Chuck Versus the Muuurder"	May 26, 2011	173	10	—N/a	—N/a
20	"Chuck Versus the Family Volkoff"	June 2, 2011	192	7	—N/a	—N/a
21	"Chuck Versus the Wedding Planner"	June 9, 2011	181	10	83	4
22	"Chuck Versus Agent X"	June 16, 2011	244	5	—N/a	—N/a
23	"Chuck Versus the Last Details"	June 23, 2011	195	5	—N/a	—N/a
24	"Chuck Versus the Cliffhanger"	June 30, 2011	212	7	—N/a	—N/a

== Home media release ==
Chuck: The Complete Fourth Season
Set Details			Special Features
24 Episodes; 5-Disc Set; English; Subtitles: English, Spanish, French			Declassified Scenes; Chuck Versus Directing: Zachary Levi Takes Charge; Gag Reel; Spying on the Cast - Operation Gomez: Joshua Gomez Shows Off His Newfound Spy Skills; Buy Hard: The Jeff and Lester Story: The Chronicle of Their Quest for an Elusive Video Game
Release Dates
United States; Canada	United Kingdom	Australia; New Zealand	Japan
October 11, 2011	October 3, 2011	February 1, 2012	February 1, 2012
