= Chuck Versus the Family Volkoff =

- Chuck episode
- Episode no.: Season 4 Episode 20
- Directed by: Robert Duncan McNeill
- Written by: Amanda Kate Shuman; Nicholas Wootton
- Production code: 3X6320
- Original air date: April 11, 2011

Guest appearances
- Linda Hamilton as Mary Elizabeth Bartowski; Timothy Dalton as Alexei Volkoff; Lauren Cohan as Vivian McArthur Volkoff; Mekenna Melvin as Alex McHugh; Kevin Daniels as Ellyas Abshir

Episode chronology
← Previous "Chuck Versus the Muuurder"	Next → "Chuck Versus the Wedding Planner"
- Chuck season 4

"Chuck Versus the Family Volkoff" is the 20th episode of the fourth season of Chuck, and the 74th overall episode of the series. The episode was directed by Robert Duncan McNeill and written by Nicholas Wootton and Amanda Kate Shuman. It originally aired April 11, 2011.

The episode has several unrelated sub-plots. In the episode, Sarah Walker (Yvonne Strahovski) throws Chuck Bartowski (Zachary Levi) a surprising relationship curveball as the CIA orders Vivian Volkoff (Lauren Cohan) assassinated. In order to prove Vivian's innocence, Chuck must put his trust in a dangerous ally – Vivian's father Alexei (Timothy Dalton). Meanwhile, Ellie Bartowski-Woodcomb (Sarah Lancaster) suspects that her mother Mary (Linda Hamilton) is interfering with the search into her father Stephen's past.

"Chuck Versus the Family Volkoff" received positive reviews from critics. However, the episode continued Chuck's steady decline in viewership, drawing 4.03 million viewers, a series low. According to the Nielsen ratings system, it had a 2.5/4 share among all households and 1.3/4 share among those aged 18–49.

== Plot ==
After Ellie Bartowski-Woodcomb (Sarah Lancaster) unlocks files about "Agent X" on her father's laptop, she begins reading about the Intersect. Ellie later discovers that her mother Mary (Linda Hamilton) has deleted a file. Ellie and Devon Woodcomb (Ryan McPartlin) spy on Mary and witness her deleting more files. It is then revealed that Mary has extracted the files for General Diane Beckman (Bonita Friedericy). Mary urges Chuck to stop lying to Ellie and tell her the truth about his place in the CIA.

Meanwhile, Sarah Walker presents Chuck with a prenuptial agreement. Advised by John Casey (Adam Baldwin) and Morgan Grimes (Joshua Gomez) to "be cool", Chuck signs the agreement, worrying Sarah, who had expected an emotional reaction.

Morgan receives an invitation to go to Alex McHugh's (Mekenna Melvin) graduation. To hide the fact that Casey is still alive from her mother, Alex arranges to meet Casey between the ceremony and dinner with her mother.

In the episode's main plot, the CIA orders Vivian Volkoff (Lauren Cohan) assassinated for the murders in "Chuck Versus the Muuurder", but Chuck negotiates a meet to determine if Vivian is really guilty. As a sign of good faith, Vivian gives them a weapon from the Volkoff Industries arsenal. Suddenly, a sniper shoots Vivian in the arm, causing her to flee. Chuck and Sarah meet Vivian's father Alexei Volkoff (Timothy Dalton) in prison, and he confirms that the weapon is one of three components of the "Norseman", a DNA tracker that could instantly kill a target. Volkoff asserts that he is a changed man. In exchange for a meeting with his daughter, Volkoff agrees to lead the team to the missing components.

The team travels to Mogadishu, Somalia, and acquires the targeting device from pirate Ellyas Abshir (Kevin Daniels). They then travel to the Swiss Alps to obtain the killing agent, thorium. Volkoff manages to access the vault by winning a game of computer chess before a timer expires and triggers several turrets. Outside, Sarah and Casey detect Russian chatter and rush to Chuck's aid, only to become trapped by Vivian, who is not injured. When Volkoff asks his daughter to release him, she refuses, feeling deceived and abandoned by him. She takes the thorium and leaves everyone in the vault with armed plasma bombs which Volkoff deactivates with a portable EMP generator. At Castle, Volkoff says goodbye to Mary before being returned to custody.

As Casey grows increasingly uncomfortable with Alex lying to her mother, he considers revealing himself to her mother. It is revealed that Sarah has money saved up in case her father is arrested again, and she tears the prenuptial agreement. Chuck later brings his own document, requiring that Sarah never suggest divorce, which she gladly signs. Chuck takes Mary's advice to tell Ellie the truth about his place in the CIA. However, when he goes to confess and first mentions their father's computer, Ellie lies to his face. At Volkoff Industries, Vivian is determined to find and kill "Agent X", the only person her father ever feared.

== Production ==
"Chuck Versus the Family Volkoff" was directed by producer Robert Duncan McNeill, and was written by Nicholas Wootton and Amanda Kate Shuman. The episode is Shuman's first writing credit, as she had previously been only a writer's assistant. It originally aired in the United States on April 11, 2011, on NBC as the twentieth episode of Chuck's fourth season and the 74th episode overall. In the episode, guest stars Linda Hamilton, Timothy Dalton, Lauren Cohan, and Mekenna Melvin reprise their recurring roles of Alexei Volkoff, Mary Elizabeth Bartowski, Vivian Volkoff, and Alex McHugh, respectively. The episode also features Kevin Daniels as Ellyas Abshir.

In their respective reviews of the episode, HitFix Senior Editor Alan Sepinwall and Ryan McGee of The A.V. Club wrote of various ideas the episode's writers introduced. Sepinwall noted several developments in the relationships between characters of the series. Sepinwall wrote that after becoming roommates, Casey and Morgan have become "an old married couple", drinking orange juice in unison and bickering with mouths full of cereal. In an "emotional role reversal" from previous points in their relationship, Chuck tries to be "cool" about Sarah's prenuptial agreement, while Sarah panics at Chuck's lack of an emotional reaction. Casey's relationship with his daughter also develops to the point that he considers revealing himself to her mother. Both Sepinwall and McGee wrote that Vivian was designed to be Chuck's counterpart. The episode also marks the beginning of Alexei's path to redemption. IGN writer Eric Goldman criticized the scene where Chuck and Sarah meet with Vivian for its frequent use of quick zooms to increase tension, writing that it "just didn't feel like it was natural to this show's style."

=== Cultural references ===
This episodes maintains the series' tendency to reference popular culture. While reading a volume of A Song of Ice and Fire, Chuck notes, "Eddard, you don't let your kids keep a direwolf. That's a terrible idea." This episode aired the same week as Game of Thrones first premiered on HBO. Chuck and Ellyas later play Uno for the thorium. Volkoff jokes that to mine said thorium, he had to wage war with natives and destroy their Hometree, only to reveal that he and the other prisoners had recently watched Avatar.

== Reception ==
"Chuck Versus the Family Volkoff" continued Chuck's steady decline in viewership, drawing 4.028 million viewers, a series low. It also had a 2.5/4 share among all households and 1.3/4 share among those aged 18–49.

The episode received generally positive reviews from critics. HitFix Senior Editor Alan Sepinwall wrote that "Timothy Dalton was everything we had come to expect from him in the part: scary and dangerous and then so much the funnier for the way he kept trying to work the steps and turn over a new leaf. The episode left [Alexei]'s sincerity up in the air for most of the hour - was he really serious about making amends, or just trying to distract Chuck from his latest evil plan? - but Volkoff is such a well-drawn character, and Dalton so talented and versatile, that the comedy worked either way... Vivian, on the other hand? I'd been iffy on her in her most recent appearance, and putting her on camera with [Alexei], even briefly, was just a reminder of how much less she brings to the table." Ryan McGee of The A.V. Club gave the episode an A−. Though he praised Dalton's performance, McGee wrote, "The direct parallels between Chuck and Vivian haven't really panned out in the way the show initially envisioned it. Let's face it: These two aren't exactly Buffy and Faith in terms of being foils for one another. The show has never painted Chuck as ever potentially going to the dark side. It has used Casey and occasionally Sarah to serve that function at times, but never Chuck. At this point, he's as set in his moral code as possible. Had the Vivian storyline happened at the outset of his Intersect 2.0 days, perhaps the taste of power could have gone to his head, with Vivian as an example of the road not taken. As such, Vivian's existence largely serves to connect her to the larger spy world of the show, not draw a direct parallel to the support system that helped Chuck overcome any potential temptations." Eric Goldman of IGN gave this episode a score of 8 out of 10, writing, "This Chuck got off to a shaky start. I don't know how to put my finger on it exactly, but the pacing felt off in the first third or so of the episode... Thankfully, things picked up considerably as the episode went along – I'd say the turning point was the scene in which Chuck was sent in to meet with the pirates. The way Chuck's big announcement that he worked for Alexei Volkoff immediately led to a bunch of guns pulled on him was funny, as was not only Chuck asking to play Uno (for his life), but that the pirate did indeed have the game." Carl Cortez of Assignment X, however, gave the episode a negative review, calling it "a painfully nonsense driven episode that's now grasping at straws in an attempt to round out the last part of the season with an adequate storyline."
