= Chuck Versus the Masquerade =

- Chuck episode
- Chuck and Vivian
- Episode no.: Season 4 Episode 16
- Directed by: Patrick Norris
- Written by: Rafe Judkins; Lauren LeFranc
- Production code: 3X6316
- Original air date: February 21, 2011

Guest appearances
- Lauren Cohan as Vivian McArthur; Robin Givens as Jane Bentley; David S. Lee as Boris Kaminsky; Mekenna Melvin as Alex McHugh; Sonya Macari as Antonia; David Reynolds as Christoph

Episode chronology
← Previous "Chuck Versus the Cat Squad"	Next → "Chuck Versus the First Bank of Evil"

"Chuck Versus the Masquerade" is the sixteenth episode of the fourth season of Chuck. Although taking place on and around Valentine's Day, the episode actually aired originally on February 21, 2011, one week later. Valentine's Day is ruined when the team is dispatched to protect heiress Vivian McArthur (Lauren Cohan). John Casey is tempted by an offer from National Clandestine Service Director Jane Bentley (Robin Givens), and Morgan Grimes makes a big decision.

== Plot ==
Former Volkoff Industries operative Boris Kaminsky embarks on a quest to find a key that unlocks a crucial part of Alexei Volkoff’s office, giving him control over the organization. He murders two of Volkoff’s former lieutenants in pursuit of this key. Kaminsky eventually tracks down the last remaining lieutenant, who claims to know the key's location. Although Kaminsky spares him, the lieutenant is later found dead by the CIA, raising concerns about Kaminsky's lethal determination.

Meanwhile, Chuck Bartowski and Morgan Grimes' Valentine's Day evening with their girlfriends is interrupted with a new mission from General Beckman. They are tasked with protecting Vivian McArthur, Alexei Volkoff’s potential successor, who is in danger from Boris Kaminsky. The team travels to England to apprehend Vivian and keep her safe from Kaminsky’s deadly pursuit. They learn Vivian is Volkoff's daughter, who has been kept in the dark about her father's dangerous exploits, to which Chuck can relate.

Sarah poses as a decoy for Vivian while Casey kills Kaminsky's mooks, while Vivian is confronted by Klaminsky himself. Klaminsky repeatedly asks Vivian for a "key" her father left her, which she knows nothing about. She ends up shooting him dead after he insults her. During the debriefing, Vivian comes to realize the "key" Boris was looking for is actually the pendant on her necklace, a gift from Alexei. She goes to her father's now-abandoned office, and finds a horse statue with a hold the pendant fits in, unlocking a hidden door.

Meanwhile, Morgan feels depressed as the "third wheel" in Chuck and Sarah's relationship, and considers moving out. Ellie and Devon can't sleep with Clara's crying. They find a recording by Jeffster that can calm her down, but they grow tired of the song after a while. Both subplots are resolved with Morgan donating his Han Solo and Chewbacca action figures to Clara's new nursery.

== Production ==
It was announced in February 2011 that the episode would mark the first appearance of Lauren Cohan and Robin Givens in their recurring roles of Vivian McArthur and Jane Bentley, respectively. It was originally to be titled as "Chuck Versus the First Mate". When Morgan looks through his old stuff before moving out, one of the earliest promotional photographs, released prior to the pilot episode, is seen, depicting Chuck and Morgan.

=== Continuity ===
- Clara Woodcomb is stated to be three months old. However, if the date of the episode is Valentine's Day, this would have placed her birth near the events of "Chuck Versus the Leftovers".
- Clara seems to like the same music as her father; Devon mentions in "Chuck Versus the Push Mix" that his favorite band is Rusted Root.

=== Flashes ===
- Chuck flashes on gymnastics to unhorse two of Kaminsky's men.

== Cultural references ==
- Chuck plans to watch Love Actually.
- Chuck and Vivian both compare the masquerade to Eyes Wide Shut.
- Chuck directly quotes and cites Vivian Ward (Julia Roberts) in Pretty Woman.
- Morgan uses Han Solo and Chewbacca toys as a metaphor for his friendship with Chuck.
- The scene where Morgan gives his toys to Ellie for Clara's room alludes to Toy Story 3.

== Reception ==
"Chuck Versus the Masquerade" received mixed reviews from critics. HitFix writer Alan Sepinwall wrote that the episode was "a much denser episode of 'Chuck' than we often get, and one that handled almost all of its assignments superbly. Lots going on, but it didn't feel too busy." Sepinwall also found that "the Morgan end of things was even more fun, starting with that hilarious glimpse of Morgan and Alex 'transferring energy' while a baffled and scared Chuck and Sarah watched, then going on to Sarah trying to have a playdate with Morgan..., followed by some serious bromantice moments for Chuck (who has dressed as Han Solo, at least in a CIA-manufactured photo) and Morgan (who is furry enough, but not tall enough, to pass for Chewbacca). However, Steve Heisler of The A.V. Club gave the episode a D, criticizing its horseback riding scene and writing, "'Chuck Versus The Masquerade' was one of the most forgettable episodes in Chuck's history, and it exemplifies everything that is wrong with this show. Remember how everyone used to hate Chuck during season two, but we loyal viewers were all like 'You just don't get it, maaaaaaan' [snaps fingers whilst wearing a beret(s)]? This episode is everything they were talking about, only now the call is coming from inside the house."

Eric Goldman of IGN gave this episode a score of 9 out of 10, finding Cohan's performance "impressive". Goldman also commented on the episode's subplot, writing that "the angst between Chuck and Morgan was both sweet and funny, including the integral use of their Han Solo and Chewbacca toys as a metaphor for their friendship." Goldman concluded, "All in all, this was a jam-packed, exciting episode that built towards a cool conclusion and looks to be setting the stage for some big events to come."

The episode drew 5.48 million viewers.
