= John Casey (Chuck) =

- Chuck character
- Adam Baldwin as John Casey
- First appearance: "Chuck Versus the Intersect"
- Last appearance: "Chuck Versus the Goodbye"
- Portrayed by: Adam Baldwin; Sterling Jones (young Coburn)

In-universe information
- Alias: Alexander Coburn (birth name)
- Nickname: Angel de la Muerte (Angel of Death) Angel de la Vida (Angel of Life) Sugar Bear
- Gender: Male
- Title: Colonel
- Occupation: Former or retired USMC officer Former NSA Agent; Briefly CIA-NCS agent Private intelligence operative Buy More "Greenshirt" & "Deputy Assistant Manager" (cover)
- Family: Kathleen McHugh (former fiancee); Alex McHugh (daughter)
- Religion: Protestant
- Born: 1971 or earlier
- Affiliation: United States Marine Corps; National Security Agency; Operation Bartowski; Morgan Grimes (partner & roommate); Sarah Walker (partner-employer); Chuck Bartowski (partner-employer); Brigadier General Diane Beckman (former commanding officer)
- Expertise: Highly trained in espionage tradecraft; hand-to-hand combat and firearms expert (particularly sniper rifles), and as a special forces officer, has been trained to resist extensive and brutal interrogation; champion of Quantify data process and liability programming.

Colonel John Casey (born Alexander Coburn) is portrayed by actor Adam Baldwin on the television show Chuck on NBC. Prior to the episode "Chuck Versus the Tic Tac", he was partnered with CIA agent Sarah Walker to protect Chuck Bartowski.

In episode 21 of season 2, "Chuck Versus the Colonel", Major Casey was promoted and subsequently addressed as "colonel." In episode 10 of season 3, "Chuck Versus the Tic Tac", Colonel Casey was dismissed, adopting his cover of an overaged retail electronics salesman as his life. He was reinstated in "Chuck Versus the Other Guy" as a condition of his turning over the Ring director whom he captured in Paris.

He was dismissed again at the end of the season 4 "Chuck Versus the Cliffhanger", and was hired by Chuck and Sarah for their private spy operation. He left Carmichael Industries to pursue his love interest, Gertrude, in the series finale.

== Biography ==
Only scattered information has been revealed about John Casey's past or his family. "Chuck Versus the Tic Tac" reveals that his real name is Alexander Coburn (Chuck had flashed on this name in a previous episode, but the face is redacted and Casey cautions him not to dig further) and that under the command of Col. James Keller, he faked his death and was given the new identity of John Casey. In a second-season episode, Casey was shown calling someone he referred to as his mother, but considering the situation and the fact that he referred to himself as "Johnny Boy", it seems he was speaking in code. He was a choirboy and has perfect pitch.

Even his age is unknown, though there are clues in his revealed career history. He was attempting assassinations in the 1980s; he left the Marines to become an agent in January 1989; he was 23 years old when he started training with his mentor, NSA instructor Ty Bennett; and it was 1994 at some point in his training with Bennett.

Casey has flown a stealth fighter. He holds his rank through the US Marine Corps. "Chuck Versus the Fake Name" reveals that Casey is a world-class sniper, and it is confirmed two episodes later that he began his career as a hot-shot Marine sniper. He served as a lieutenant in a Marine amphibious force in Honduras in January 1989. While serving there, Casey was informed that he had not qualified to train with Special Operations Command, and immediately after receiving this news was recruited into the NSA by Colonel James Keller.

"Chuck Versus the Tic Tac" reveals that Casey served in the Marine Corps as Alex Coburn and had a fiancée named Kathleen McHugh. However, Col. Keller ordered Casey to fake his death, requiring him to give up his life and Kathleen, whom he did not know was pregnant at the time. She told him over the phone that she had some news for him, but before she could finish, Keller cut them off and gave Casey his order of faking his death. Later in that episode, after Chuck rescues Kathleen from Keller's men who were sent to kill her, Casey arrives to help him clear everything up and finds out that Kathleen has a daughter named Alex whom Casey fathered, and who is named after him. When Casey is dismissed from the NSA by Beckman, Chuck tries to persuade him that all is not lost and that it is not too late to make amends for the past now that he is a civilian because Kathleen lives around town and he can finally get to know his daughter. Casey tells Chuck that he made the choice of love of country over love of a woman a long time ago, and that it was and still is the best decision for him. In season four, Casey reveals that he had proposed to Kathleen prior to being sent overseas, noting that there was no such thing as the perfect place to propose (he proposed at the bus depot); the only thing you need is the girl.

In the NSA, despite lacking the usual qualifications, Casey was eventually accepted into the tutelage of the aforementioned Ty Bennett, under whom he trained for "a long time" (Sarah's words) and who taught Casey everything he knows (Casey's words). While teaching Casey hand-to-hand combat techniques, Bennett attempted to help Casey, who already had a short temper, find a "calm center." Since then, Casey survived torture by Baath separatists and spent two years undercover in Afghanistan. He also attended Roan Montgomery's course on Infiltration and Inducement of Enemy Personnel ("Seduction School") and failed it twice – although Montgomery revealed that he failed Casey because Casey's partner was "too pretty" to let go.

During the Clinton-era, Casey was the tactician in a special forces unit that included Packard, a special weapons expert, T.I., a hand-to-hand combat expert, and MacKintosh, an electronics expert. In 1999, the team traveled to the Zargos Mountains of Iran and planted charges to seal a safe full of gold used to fund terrorists. Packard, T.I., and MacKintosh attempted to steal the gold, but Casey managed to incapacitate them. He sealed the vault so that it could only be opened with his hand print identification. He then dragged the team to safety and had them court martialed.

Casey suffered a devastating personal tragedy while stationed undercover in Chechnya. He was involved with an Associated Press photographer named Ilsa Trinchina who was apparently killed in a bomb blast near the hotel where they were staying. The incident left him deeply traumatized, with cameras apparently causing flashbacks to the tragedy. It was later revealed that Ilsa was a French spy who had faked her own death. Ilsa reappeared in "Chuck Versus the Undercover Lover" as the undercover fiancé of a Russian crime boss. Casey also had a final tryst with Ilsa after capturing the Russian crime boss before she departed for further espionage missions.

He has had previous dealings with CIA agents Bryce Larkin and Sarah Walker and has been intimately involved in some capacity with Sarah's DEA friend Carina as well.

== Series ==
Casey was on-hand when Bryce Larkin stole the Intersect data, and participated in the pursuit to apprehend him. He shot Bryce during his escape attempt, apparently fatally, but not before Larkin was able to successfully send the contents of the Intersect to his old college roommate, Chuck Bartowski. The National Intelligence Director (Wendy Makkena) dispatched Casey with a team to clean up the operation. He was to find the Intersect data and capture Chuck to determine what Chuck knew and who he worked for. CIA agent Sarah Walker simultaneously attempted to recover the Intersect, and in their independent missions, Casey and Walker ended up in a standoff for control of Chuck. After Sarah proved Chuck was not a threat and both agents discovered that he contained the Intersect secrets in his brain, Casey was assigned to protect him.

During an assessment to determine whether the Intersect could be removed from Chuck's head, consulting Dr. Zarnow was apparently killed by a bomb planted in his car. Sarah and Casey each secretly blamed the other for murdering Dr. Zarnow after investigating the wreckage. Sarah showed Chuck the detonator she recovered, and the flash identified it as a NSA device. However, later, Casey and Chuck were both nearly killed by another of the same device, implicating Sarah as the assassin. After a confrontation between Chuck and Sarah it was revealed that Zarnow faked his own death. The doctor kidnapped Sarah in hopes of torturing the identity of the Intersect from her. Casey and Chuck pursued, and Chuck was subsequently captured and loaded on a helicopter. However Chuck resisted and the pilot was knocked unconscious. Casey attempted to talk Chuck through landing, but quickly lost his patience at which point Sarah took control and helped him down.

Despite their frequent antagonism, Casey revealed his respect for Chuck's honesty and good nature while under the effects of truth serum. Sarah while under the effects of the truth serum calls Casey her partner, their working relationship improves. However given Sarah's admission to having trained to resist such drugs it's possible Casey has as well.

As part of his cover Casey is given a job at the Buy More where he works as a "Green Shirt" selling appliances. Despite poor customer service skills, Casey is nonetheless an effective, if aggressive, salesman, and he is ruthless in dealing with shoplifting. When interviewed for a Buy More instructional video, it was revealed that he nearly eliminated shoplifting from the Burbank, California branch. Although most of his coworkers are afraid of him, they also know to come to him in dangerous situations. In the transition from Season 2 to Season 3, Casey quits his job at the Buy More at the same time as Chuck, only to be re-hired along with Chuck and Morgan less than a year later when it once again becomes a useful cover. When Morgan needs help to put down an employee revolt led by Lester, a visibly gleeful Casey remarks, "Insurgents? I hate insurgents!." Promoted by Morgan to "Lieutenant Assistant Manager;" Casey intimidates the staff by putting out a burning a cigar using his arm and not flinching a muscle, and (without fully disclosing to Morgan) ultimately brainwashes Lester, and for his success Morgan rewards him with a raise.

Casey spends much of his downtime monitoring Chuck's home with listening devices from his apartment in the same complex. His preferred listening device is the EM-50. When Chuck discovers the bugs after a tip off from Laszlo and confronts his handler, Casey shows little reaction despite it being one of the first times Chuck directly stands up to him. Casey also keeps a "Chuck diary", which he keeps hidden in his Buy More locker. Chuck later admits to being a fan of Casey's work.

Casey is forced to face a painful chapter from his past when Chuck flashes on a list of Russian mobsters staying in Los Angeles, and one of the names, Ilsa Trinchina, points directly to "Sugar Bear," a name Chuck realizes was her pet name for Casey. Chuck innocently teases Casey over it and Casey's temper nearly drives him to strangle Chuck. Sarah then reveals to Chuck that Trinchina was apparently killed by a bomb in Chechnya. Later, Chuck and Casey learn that Ilsa is a French spy and had faked her death in the blast. Chuck convinces Casey to fight for her, and although they rekindle their relationship, Casey and Ilsa ultimately part ways.

He meets with a very personal betrayal when he discovers his old mentor and sensei, Ty Bennett, had turned rogue and is building a criminal empire with former students, even inviting Casey to join him. The mission to capture Bennett nearly proves fatal to Chuck when Casey allows the vendetta to distract him. As a result, Beckman orders Casey to stand down and pulls him off the case to apprehend Bennett, bluntly telling him that he was never told Bennett went rogue because they knew he would go after him. After being confined to Castle, Casey takes advantage of Chuck's empathy and compassion to facilitate his escape, then goes after Bennett himself. Casey duels with Bennett, who taunts him over his lack of focus and calm. Chuck, realizing that Casey's anger is his strength, tricks Casey into instead channeling his anger to defeat Bennett. For this, Casey shows a rare moment of sincere gratitude to Chuck.

Despite his long service, including in many dangerous hot spots spanning three wars, Casey had never lost an appendage in the line of duty. However, this changes when Ned Rhyerson, a Fulcrum agent posing as a frightened amateur criminal, takes the Buy More hostage as a setup to discover what the CIA and NSA were protecting there. When Ned discovers Casey, secretly knowing that Casey is with the NSA, he feigns an inexperience with firearms, pretended not to know how to uncock his revolver; when the weapon "accidentally" fires, the bullet severs a substantial part of Casey's left pinky toe.

Unknown to Sarah and Chuck, who believed that Chuck would be allowed to return to his civilian life once the Intersect mission is finished, Casey was under orders to execute Chuck to prevent the data from falling into the wrong hands once Chuck's Intersect became redundant. After recovering the Cipher, a key component of the rebuilt Intersect, the command to terminate Chuck is given. Casey attempts to appeal the decision, but Beckman and Graham believe there is no other choice; Graham specifically asks Casey if could remove the Intersect from Chuck's head and guarantee that Chuck would not be kidnapped and tortured, and Casey admits he could not. However, before Casey could carry out his orders, the Trojan horse Cipher explodes, killing Graham and destroying the new Intersect. This turn of events retracted his terminate orders since Chuck still is the only copy of the Intersect, and the orders naturally become moot after Chuck's father removes the original Intersect from Chuck's brain. The order appears to remain rescinded following Chuck's decision to implant the Intersect 2.0 into his brain. After failing his spy training, Chuck is dismissed from the agency, and Casey appears ready to pull out of Burbank without any mention of execution orders.

Despite his aforementioned hatred of Alejandro Goya, Casey is forced to save the Premier's life from an attempted assassination by The Ring. As he had the same blood type, his blood is also used to save the premier. Goya is so grateful he acknowledges Casey for his great skills, and gives him a gift of pre-revolution cigars. Later in the series, Goya is deposed in a coup d'état led by his wife, Hortencia, causing Goya to flee his homeland, Costa Gravas; Goya decides that the safest place for him to stay is with Casey. Casey reveals that Goya's trusted adviser, Turinni, is infatuated with Hortencia, and exposes him as one of the driving forces behind the coup. To save Casey's life, Goya knocks Casey out and agrees to go back to Costa Gravas. Casey, who has extensive knowledge of Costa Gravas and Goya's palace, leads Sarah and Chuck through Costa Gravas' sewers in a mission to save Goya. As Chuck and Sarah successfully mediate between Goya and Hortencia, Casey captures Turrini, and the three prevent a nuclear attack on the States. Goya addresses Casey as the man that saved Costa Gravas from civil war and leads him from the nuclear control room to the palace where he had a more fitting reward for the Angel of Life.

In "Chuck Versus the Tic Tac," Casey is coerced by his former commander, Col. Keller, who is now a Ring spy, to steal a combat-performance-enhancing pill. Keller threatens to have Casey's ex fiancée, Kathleen McHugh, killed unless he cooperates. Despite General Beckman's orders to stand down, and facing charges of treason, Casey does everything he can to save Kathleen, eventually getting help from Chuck and Sarah. In the end, Keller is taken down, Kathleen is saved, and instead of going to prison for treason, Beckman gives Casey a something of a "second second chance", dismissing him from the Marine Corps and NSA service, and allowing him re-enter civilian life without his pension.

Casey finds readjusting to life as a civilian difficult, and nearly ends up sued for assault by Jeff and Lester after he catches them goofing off in the store. Big Mike successfully mediates the situation in an effort to "smooth" Casey's jagged edges. He is surprised to learn Chuck has been called in for his "final exam," and later breaks the law by killing Chuck's "red test" target when Chuck himself hesitated. Casey subsequently warns him not to reveal what happened, as Casey had committed an unsanctioned murder and in the process defrauded the government.

In "Chuck Versus the American Hero," Casey sees Chuck as his opportunity to get back to spy work when he learns Chuck is authorized by Beckman to choose his own team. After Chuck announces his intentions to win Sarah back first before making any other decisions, Casey agrees to join forces with Morgan and Devon to help. Unfortunately their efforts are not entirely successful and the three of them end up in jail for the night. Later, Casey helps Sarah escape Castle when Chuck locks her in while going to rescue Shaw. After the mission, with Sarah packing to meet Chuck at the train station, Casey meets her at her apartment, admits that he killed Perry, and wishes her a good life.

Casey is reinstated by General Beckman following the events of "Chuck Versus the Other Guy," after he apprehended Ring head The Director while Chuck stopped the now-rogue Shaw and rescued Sarah. Recognizing the part he played in the operation, Casey also vouches for Morgan with Beckman and arranges for him to be officially hired on to Team Bartowski.

When Chuck and Sarah go AWOL yet again while in Paris in the episode "Chuck Versus the Honeymooners," Beckman orders Casey to track the two with Morgan's assistance. Although initially reluctant to accept Morgan's help, he is eventually forced to acknowledge that Morgan was more useful than he first considered; as Beckman had noted, "Mr. Grimes and the Intersect have a strangely co-dependent relationship." After tracking down his missing partners and helping them apprehend a defecting Basque terrorist, Casey decides to let the two run away to leave the spy life. The mission nearly ends disastrously when two Interpol agents coming to take the prisoner into custody are revealed to be members of the terrorist ETA, but Casey and Morgan are rescued by Chuck and Sarah. After the mission, Casey personally vouches to General Beckman for Morgan's role in locating Chuck and Sarah and his decisive actions in securing the Basque prisoner.

In "Chuck Versus the Tooth" Casey is unwittingly involved in a Ring plot to seize Stephen Bartowski, when a Ring operative named Justin Sullivan, Ellie meet in Africa identifies Casey as a double-agent attempting to get his hands on her father. She becomes convinced when she sees Casey's cache of weapons. In "Chuck Versus the Living Dead", Casey is told by Chuck to keep and eye on Ellie and he tails her. However, when he finds her attempting to meet with her Ring contact, Casey presumes that she is having an affair and tells Morgan to question Devon. Casey later attempts to plant bugs around Ellie's apartment, thinking that she would not be home for a while. When she arrives back and heard him upstairs, Justin tells her to use the gun inside set of speakers he gave her to deal with Casey. Ellie cannot bring herself to do it and instead bludgeons Casey with a frying pan before running to Justin, who secretly holds her captive.

At four years, Team Bartowski is the longest assignment Casey has ever had, and he has effectively put down roots. Consequently, he initially refuses an offer to leave the NSA to command a CIA National Clandestine Service team because he does not wish to leave Burbank; NSA Director Jane Bentley (Robin Givens), however, then shows him to the new section of Castle from which he would be based. He is retired or dismissed again after he and his team go rogue in "Chuck Versus the Cliffhanger" to save Sarah's life; he and Morgan are then hired by Chuck and Sarah's new private spy operation.

== Development ==
Adam Baldwin was cast in the role of John Casey, announced on February 8, 2007. Schwartz had Baldwin in mind for the role almost from the beginning of the casting process.

Although the character of Casey has received relatively little attention, Schwartz indicated in interviews that "Chuck Versus the Undercover Lover" established a lot of what made Casey, Casey. He received further development in "Chuck Versus the Sensei," when it's revealed that his former mentor had turned rogue. Most lately, Casey's beginnings, along with the revelation that John Casey was not his birth name, was hinted at during "Chuck Versus the Fake Name" before being revealed in "Chuck Versus the Tic Tac", along with significant present-storyline development, including his dismissal from government employment. Much of Casey's personality and background is revealed through small details that surface in episodes, often used to humorous effect.

Interviews with Josh Schwartz and Chris Fedak at San Diego Comic-Con 2009 have indicated Casey's role will develop from strictly a protector to take on aspects of a mentor/student relationship with Chuck. Chris Fedak has also confirmed that Casey's family will be revisited later in Season 3.

=== Branch of Service ===
Confusion throughout the series over Casey's branch of service was resolved in "Chuck Versus the Angel de la Muerte," when he both identifies himself as a Marine and the letters USMC are clearly visible stamped on his dog tags. "Chuck Versus the Tic Tac" had previously supported the theory that Casey was a Marine officer, and his recruitment into the special forces is depicted in a flashback. Furthermore, he constantly wears a class ring resembling the United States Naval Academy, a commissioning source for Naval and Marine officers. He wears his Marine Corps Blue Dress "B" uniform when staging his own funeral in "Chuck Versus the Couch Lock".

=== Rank ===
In addition to confusion over his branch of service, the series was also ambiguous over the rank Casey was promoted to in "Chuck Versus the Colonel." Throughout the episode, he is referred to as "Colonel Casey." Although normal rank progression from major is to be promoted to lieutenant colonel, the episode never establishes whether he was promoted to this rank or full colonel, as both ranks are frequently referred to as "colonel" in casual usage, and "colonel" is the proper honorific used when addressing officers of either rank.

"Chuck Versus the Couch Lock" ultimately clarified Casey's rank when he is seen wearing the eagle insignia of a full colonel with his dress uniform, confirming that by this episode Casey had received a promotion to "full bird colonel." However it is still unknown whether he skipped ranks directly to full colonel, or if he was initially promoted to lieutenant colonel during the events of "Chuck Versus the Colonel" and had since been promoted again.

=== Awards and decorations ===
Awards and decorations identified from a close-up of Casey's/Coburn's "fruit salad".

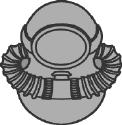
?
?

Scuba Diver
Navy and Marine Corps Parachutist
Unidentified	Navy Cross	Navy Distinguished Service Medal	Silver Star
Navy Good Conduct Medal	Defense Superior Service Medal	Legion of Merit	Bronze Star with Valor device
Unidentified	Defense Meritorious Service Medal	Meritorious Service Medal	Navy and Marine Corps Commendation Medal with 2 service stars indicating 3 awards
Nebraska Outstanding Soldier Medal	Joint Service Achievement Medal	Navy and Marine Corps Combat Action Ribbon	Navy and Marine Corps Presidential Unit Citation with 4 service stars indicating 5 awards
Navy Unit Commendation	Navy Meritorious Unit Commendation	Navy E Ribbon	Marine Corps Expeditionary Medal
Armed Forces Expeditionary Medal	Vietnam Service Medal with 3 campaign stars	Humanitarian Service Medal	Sea Service Deployment Ribbon
Philippine Independence Medal	Vietnam Gallantry Cross Unit Citation	Vietnam Civil Actions Unit Citation	Vietnam Campaign Medal
Expert Rifle Badge		Expert Pistol Badge	

=== Continuity ===
"Chuck Versus the Tic Tac" introduced further confusion into Casey's age, service, and background. Although in "Chuck Versus the Angel de la Muerte" he mentions having attempted to assassinate Premiere Goya at Beckman's personal orders on several occasions in the early 1980s (once as early as 1982) and further admitted pride in the number of Goya's men he killed fighting against the Communist revolution in Costa Gravas, the name "John Casey" did not even appear in the government's records until 1989. Beckman herself gave no indication of having known Casey was born as Alexander Coburn until his file was opened after his apparent treason. In "Chuck Versus Santa Claus" Casey is seen calling his "mother" and identifying himself as "Johnny Boy."

The character's age is implied to be considerably older than that of Baldwin in "Chuck Versus the Couch Lock". His ribbons include the Vietnam Service Medal with three campaign stars, the Vietnam Gallantry Cross (unit award), Vietnam Civil Actions Medal (unit award), and Vietnam Campaign Medal. Even if his three campaign stars are for the final three campaigns in Vietnam for which campaign stars were awarded, he would have had to have been fighting in-country on or before 29 March 1972, the last eligible day of "Consolidation II" (see Vietnam service campaign dates), thereby placing Casey well into his fifties. Still more out of place is his Philippine Independence Medal which has not been awarded since 1948. See #Awards and decorations.

The series never addresses these continuity conflicts.

=== Personality ===
John Casey was described by Sarah in "Chuck Versus the Intersect" as a "burnout", although the exact meaning of this was never explained. Chuck describes him as having an "angry center", as opposed to the traditional "calm center". He is gruff, straightforward, cynical, and hard-edged, and tends to keep everyone at an emotional distance. He is often sarcastic and ironic, and rarely shows signs of caring for anything other than his job and country (and his bonsai tree), and takes a dark delight in playing on the insecurities and romantic awkwardness of his teammates (most often Chuck, but he has teased Sarah on occasion; in one deleted scene, he seemed to enjoy Jill Roberts' discomfort upon meeting Sarah). He is often impatient and views what he knows as common knowledge, making him an incredibly poor instructor: when stuck flying a helicopter, a panic-ridden Chuck demanded that Casey put Sarah on the phone as Casey's instructions were too technical for him to understand; when tasked to train Morgan Grimes, he gives Morgan a number of tasks to test him as a field agent, but fails to demonstrate how to accomplish the tasks, subsequently causing Morgan to fail each task set. He has an adversity to those rebelling against the "order" of things, as shown with his formed alliance with Morgan against Lester's "insurgent" (as Casey put it) uprising.

Despite the humor, the unavoidable reality is that Casey is a killer and experienced assassin who has no compunction about solving problems with violence, often has difficulty distinguishing the value of human life, and seems to enjoy the prospect of killing a little too much. In the pilot, he apparently kills Bryce, he permits his fellow NSA agents to kill Sarah, and, later, he comes close to killing both Chuck and Sarah, calling it a night and going out for pancakes. A number of times, Casey has only been kept from killing Lester and Jeff because of Chuck, most notably when Lester stole Chuck's Orion Laptop and almost blew up the Burbank and Beverly Hills Buy Mores with a predator. When Anna claimed to know someone that could arrange Harry Tang to have an 'accident', Chuck immediately asked Casey if he offered his services to Anna; Casey's reaction was an overenthusiastic "No... Why? Do you want me to kill him?" When Devon broke into (and got trapped in) Casey's apartment to ascertain why Casey was so interested in Chuck, Casey was only stopped from killing Devon by Sarah's timely arrival. He has also let his anger come to the point that he almost killed Chuck when his former sensei locked Chuck in his trunk and goaded Casey to a game of chicken; Casey acquiesced despite knowing Chuck was in the trunk. In a bonus feature in the season two DVD, Casey instructs how to become a deadly spy, starting with shooting two guys who were talking off-camera and ending with advice on getting a second job during down time and advocating the elimination the other applicants ('... so go out and find a goat. Start practicing'). His predisposition to violence does lead to problems; while mainly personal (for obvious reasons), some have been professional errors that have led him to be removed from future missions (in "Chuck Versus the Suitcase", Casey is benched from going on a mission to Milan because he stabbed someone with a stiletto).

On occasion, however, Casey does allow part of his human side through. This was most clearly revealed when confronted by his former lover, Ilsa, and later by the revelation that his mentor had turned rogue. He also vouched for Sarah's father and suggested his assistance in helping them apprehend a Saudi sheik with terrorist ties should be considered when Jack Burton was to be brought to trial for his own illegal activities. Although he disagreed with Sarah's feelings for Chuck in "Chuck Versus the Crown Vic", he later attempted to defend her in front of Beckman when Sarah was to be replaced by CIA agent Alexandra Forrest, insisting that Beckman allow Chuck to state his own case as to why he worked well with Sarah and admits that she is the best partner he's ever had. Chuck has even stated that even the reason Casey acts tough is because deep down, he really does care for Chuck and Sarah not only as his partners, but as his friends and that he's just scared to show his true emotions. The depth of his personal feelings for Sarah and Chuck are illustrated in "Chuck Versus the Final Exam" and "Chuck Versus the American Hero," when he helps Chuck "cheat" on his Red Test by killing the mark. He later confessed to Sarah that he pulled the trigger because Chuck could not, as he believed the knowledge would convince Sarah she really did still love him (although Sarah had already decided to leave with Chuck). Twice in "Chuck Versus the Honeymooners" Casey offered Chuck and Sarah the chance to escape to live out their lives together, reminding Sarah of his own choice when he faked his death to be sure it was what she genuinely wanted. Despite his support for the couple's relationship, Casey is nonetheless disgusted by their public displays of affection. In "Chuck Versus the Tooth" the sincerity of Casey's regard for Chuck is revealed when he independently visited Dr. Leo Dreyfus to offer his help in determining what was happening with Chuck when the Intersect apparently began to malfunction.

Casey has a deep sense of personal honor that occasionally comes into conflict with his sense of duty to his country; in particular, he personally objects when a person has served his country honorably and is nevertheless slated to suffer as a result of government actions. When it appeared that the replacement Intersect was ready, despite the antagonism he often expressed toward Chuck, he did not want to terminate him and felt that Chuck's service to the government entitled him to a better fate than termination. However he is also loyal to his government, and when it was sufficiently explained to him that leaving Chuck alive would place the country in danger, he was prepared to carry out his instructions regardless of his personal feelings. Later, in "Chuck Versus the Colonel", Casey apprehends Chuck and Sarah for going AWOL (an act of treason and perceived personal betrayal, he expresses disappointment that they didn't ask him for his help) to rescue Chuck's father, Stephen, but promises to ensure Stephen's safety, as Stephen has served his country honorably. When Beckman tells Casey that the government plans to bomb the base where Stephen is being held, he sticks to his word and embarks on a personal mission to save Stephen. He later covers for Chuck and Sarah to General Beckman about the AWOL mission, thereby saving them from prosecution for treason.

Casey is a staunch gun rights advocate. He keeps a photo of former President Ronald Reagan in his apartment which he has a habit of saluting and addressing directly as "Sir," is a Republican, and has a "Rogues Gallery" he uses for target practice, including pictures of Adolf Hitler and Osama bin Laden. His two prized possessions are his 1985 Crown Vic and his Bonsai tree, though he deliberately killed the tree in a fit of rage when he learned his former mentor had turned rogue. He also purchased himself a new gun for Christmas. Although he expressed a dislike of President Clinton and his "mouthy wife" during the 1990s, Casey is nonetheless a strict adherent to duty and continued to follow his orders.

"Chuck Versus the First Kill" humorously suggested Casey is not as intelligent as the other team members when he tried to cheat off Chuck's Fulcrum entrance exam; however, he is an excellent shot and trained killer, and is one of five men in the world who could make a particularly difficult shot at half a mile's range. Casey is also a skilled martial artist, which is demonstrated when he fights his old sensei in "Chuck Versus the Sensei", although Casey was forced to retreat when he fought Sarah in "Chuck Versus the Helicopter". He has demonstrated a remarkable tolerance to pain and extreme endurance. He broke his own thumb to escape a set of handcuffs in "Chuck Versus the Suburbs," was able to remain awake and function relatively normally after being shot with a tranquilizer dart in "Chuck Versus the Helicopter," and it took Chuck three tranquilizer darts to put Casey down in "Chuck Versus the Dream Job." In "Chuck Versus the Fake Name" Casey not only encouraged Chuck to torture him to secure his cover with a pair of mobsters contracting for The Ring, but took Chuck completely removing one of his teeth without anesthesia in stride and casually shrugged it off as no longer needing a trip to the dentist for treating a cavity. Casey is also exceptionally strong. When Carina cuffed him to a bed in "Chuck Versus the Wookiee" he managed to free himself by tearing apart the frame with minimal leverage and no assistance, and ripped an entire radiator from the wall of a motel room in "Chuck Versus the Colonel," and, on several occasions, has lifted and throttled fully grown men off the floor literally single-handedly: Chuck Bartowski in "Chuck Versus the Undercover Lover"; Col. James Keller (whose neck he then snapped) in "Chuck Versus the Tic Tac"; and Morgan Grimes in "Chuck Versus the Couch Lock". He can turn almost anything into a weapon, including the aforementioned bed frame and radiator, as well as household appliances. Casey carries a custom SIG Sauer P229 with a two-tone accented design, often being confused with the Equinox model (Equinox model being equipped with accessory rails, whereas Casey's is not). Casey's sidearm is also modified with Crimson Trace laser grips and mounts for a suppressor throughout the series.

A significant amount of humor in the series centers around Casey's demeanor and random moments that are completely incongruous with his tough image, such as unexpectedly singing a note to which a puzzle is keyed and revealing having been a choir boy with perfect pitch, and dancing to 1990s music (specifically Hanson's "MMMBop") while undercover as a DJ at Sarah's high school reunion. One of Casey's favorite movies is Steel Magnolias. While working at the Buy More in the days leading up to Christmas 2008, Casey had been assigned to man the gift-wrap counter and was so distraught over the resulting paper cuts that he had band-aids on all his fingers. Casey, along with his Special Forces unit, was the planner of Ellie Bartowski and Devon Woodcomb's second, more successful, wedding ceremony. Casey is also fond of quiche, a dish which he takes very seriously, and takes his coffee "black and bitter". He is also somewhat vain as shown in "Chuck Versus the Three Words". When instructed to pose as Carina's father, he insists that he be a young uncle.

He frequently responds to situations with monosyllabic grunts, which Chuck can recognize and has even numbered, and often tosses off one-liners reminiscent of cliché action films, sometimes quoting Baldwin's own previous roles.

Casey goes rogue again, along with Morgan, Chuck, and Mary Bartowski, to save Sarah's life. With Operation Bartowski cancelled and the team all dismissed from government service, Casey and Morgan are hired by Chuck and Sarah for their private spy operation. He told Jane Bentley in "Chuck Versus the Masquerade" that he had no intention of leaving Burbank, indicating that Castle would be the terminal assignment of his military career. It is unclear whether Casey was dismissed again or if he retired from the Marine Corps.

== Relationships ==
=== Casey and Sarah ===
Before being assigned to protect Chuck, Casey knew of Sarah as "Langston Graham's wild-card enforcer." He authorized his fellow NSA agents to kill Sarah when attempting to take Chuck into custody and was prepared to do so himself before being jointly assigned to protect him. He also initially warns Chuck not to trust Sarah.

Casey's working relationship with Sarah was strained not long after when her personal feelings for Chuck began to interfere with their assignment to use Chuck's new girlfriend, Lou, as a means to get close to the smuggler Stavros Demetrios. Although Sarah denied any such feelings, Casey chided her for falling for men she worked with, making a point to add that he was in no way interested.

Despite his nature and preference for conventional spy tactics, Casey has realized that Operation Bartowski is most effective with Sarah Walker, and omitted most of the details of Chuck and Sarah's emotional involvement from his reports to Beckman until she specifically ordered him to give an unabridged report. This led to a 49-B, a practice wherein another Agent (in this case, Agent Forrest) would assess whether or not the emotions between the two were a liability, which, eventually, Agent Forrest decided they were. While Casey admired Forrest's thinking, he also realized she was a greater liability on the team than Sarah, despite (or perhaps even due to) her feelings for Chuck. In a rare display of emotion, he told Agent Forrest that Sarah was the best partner he ever had and strongly disagreed with her assessment of her as a liability to the operation. He encouraged Chuck to tell General Beckman why Sarah should remain on the team.

Casey and Sarah's relationship continues to grow, and Casey's strong bond with the whole team is displayed again at the end of Season 2. In season 3, Sarah stands up for Casey and helps him rescue his ex-fiancée and daughter when his old superior blackmailed Casey. Both Sarah and Chuck try to keep Casey on the team when General Backman fires him for "betraying" his country.

In "Chuck Versus the Final Exam," Casey helps Chuck pass his Red Test by killing the mole (Perry) Chuck was meant to kill but couldn't. Sarah sees the dead mole and Chuck with a gun in his hand and assumes Chuck was the one who pulled the trigger. Because of that, she refuses to get back together with Chuck because she thinks he is a changed person. Later, Casey arrives at Sarah's apartment to find her packing, admits he was the one who killed Perry and Chuck was unable to pull the trigger. At this confession, Sarah's face lights up, and she thanks Casey, who responds with wishing her a good life as he departs. Casey's confession ultimately helps Sarah and Chuck get back together.

In seasons 4 and 5, Casey and Sarah already refer to each other as friends and not just partners. They continue to work together and help each other when needed. Sarah even starts going to Casey for relationship advice. In season 4, they both acknowledge their priorities change, and they both begin putting family and friends first. In season 5, Sarah helps Casey with his love interest, Gertrude Verbanski, giving him advice and helping him ask her out on a date.

=== Casey and Chuck ===
Casey's relationship with Chuck is complicated. A running gag is that Chuck (always unintentionally) will typically cause Casey distress, embarrassment or physical harm at some point during an episode (such as the destruction of Casey's prized Crown Vic). Typically, Casey is hard on and insulting to Chuck and takes a dark pleasure in making Chuck feel insecure; he shows frustration with Chuck's constant mistakes, inability to perform tasks for which he is not trained, and constantly failing to follow orders. However, although he seldom expresses it openly, he seems to recognize that Chuck is doing the best he can as a civilian forced to act as a spy with little or no training. He does at times show appreciation for him and recognizes that he has potential as an agent. He has expressed respect for Chuck's integrity, intelligence, and inventiveness. He showed particular respect for Chuck's courage in deciding to use the only sample of an antidote in their possession to save his sister's life, even though he had been poisoned and would die without it. The two seem to have a brotherly relationship; Chuck drives Casey crazy but still cares about him.

After Chuck helped Casey save his former fiancé in "Chuck Versus the Tic Tac", Casey tells Chuck not to waste his chance with Sarah because it's not too late.

Casey, Devon and Morgan agree to help get Chuck and Sarah back together, but Chuck's first attempt fails when Sarah responds icily to his promotion. She admits after seeing him "kill" Hunter Perry, he's no longer the same man she fell in love with. Morgan, Casey and Devon refuse to let him back down, The trio borrow Jeff's spy gear-equipped van to kidnap Chuck and stakeout Sarah and Shaw on a date. While Morgan draws Shaw out of the restaurant by calling him in the guise of a Ring agent, Chuck moves in and lays out how he feels to Sarah. The plan goes belly up and the men get arrested.

Meanwhile, Casey is still largely paralyzed by his dismissal and initially unwilling to help when Morgan and Chuck arrive to enlist him in their off-book operation to save Sarah. However, Morgan is able to appeal to his sense of duty and convinces him to help. On the flight to Paris, Chuck's ability to flash is of no use in determining Shaw's destination, however Casey reminds Chuck of his own intelligence without the need of the Intersect.

He also showed genuine pride with Chuck in "Chuck Versus the Subway" when Chuck discovers and infiltrates Shaw's Ring base (clearing his, Sarah's and Casey's names and exposing Shaw as a Ring Operative and enemy Intersect) instead of directly attempting to rescue Sarah and Casey, visibly causing Shaw distress; both Sarah and Casey smile at Shaw's discomfort and Casey admits to Sarah that "Bartowski's a spy."

At the beginning of season four in "Chuck Versus the Anniversary", Casey's respect and affection for Chuck were confirmed when he shows restrained anger after a moment of grief when it seems that Chuck was executed, threatening to tear Marco "limb from limb from limb". Earlier in the episode, he remarks that Chuck should be on the mission to destroy Volkoff with Walker and himself, candidly stating that "Chuck's a spy... he's good at it." After he admits to being ticked that Chuck didn't ask for his and Sarah's help after he learns Chuck and Morgan had set out alone to search for Chuck and Ellie's missing mother, Chuck officially asks Casey and Sarah for their help, and they enthusiastically agree to help Chuck and Morgan's search. Casey tells Chuck that, even without the Intersect, he's the second best spy with whom Casey has ever worked, the first being Sarah.

At the end of series in "Chuck Versus the Goodbye", Casey shows the depth of his friendship and respect for Chuck, when he hugs Chuck goodbye, something he was visually uncomfortable with earlier on in "Chuck Versus the Ring".

=== Casey and Morgan ===
The importance Casey puts on loyalty and honor is a catalyst for his growing fondness of, and respect for, the eccentric, juvenile and essentially untrained Morgan Grimes. Casey repays Morgan for the loyalty and support Morgan provided during Casey's dismissal and humiliation, by insisting that the government hire him.

When Morgan needs help to put down an employee revolt led by Lester, a visibly gleeful Casey remarks, "Insurgents? I hate insurgents!." Promoted by Morgan to "Lieutenant Assistant Manager;" Casey intimidates the staff by putting out a burning a cigar using his arm and not flinching a muscle, and (without fully disclosing to Morgan) ultimately brainwashes Lester, and for his success Morgan rewards him with a raise.

Casey vacates his prohibition against Morgan dating Alex after Morgan saves the team's lives at great risk to his own, and is perfectly accepting of the relationship's obvious sexual component as soon as Morgan professed that he cares deeply for Alex. When Morgan defies Casey's order to retreat and goes to save his employees from terrorists, Casey immediately belays his prior order and loans Morgan a sidearm. While initially against allowing Morgan to move into his apartment, Casey is pleased with Morgan's resistance to torture and his demonstrated reliability. when tasked to train Morgan Grimes, he gives Morgan a number of tasks to test him as a field agent, but fails to demonstrate how to accomplish the tasks, subsequently causing Morgan to fail each task set. He has an adversity to those rebelling against the "order" of things, as shown with his formed alliance with Morgan against Lester's "insurgent" (as Casey put it) uprising.

=== Casey and Alex ===
It is revealed in "Chuck Versus the Subway" that Casey has re-established contact with his daughter, Alex, and is a regular visitor to the diner in which she works although she is unaware of his identity. When Justin captures Casey at the restaurant, Casey escapes, "kidnapping" Alex, later revealing his identity as her father. At the end of "Chuck Versus the Ring: Part II", Alex comes to dinner at Chuck's apartment with Morgan, to whom she gave her number, Casey, and the rest of the growing Team Bartowski. Casey has shown to be very protective of his daughter. He threatens to break Morgan's fingers (his thumbs were already broken) if Morgan does not stop flirting with Alex. After Casey is drugged and rescued, Morgan is forced to awaken him by confessing that he is dating Alex. This provokes Casey into throat-lifting Morgan, threatening his life. Morgan willingly nearly electrocutes himself to save Chuck, Sarah and Casey. Impressed by Morgan's courage and loyalty, Casey relents and deems Morgan fit to date Alex. After convincing Alex to get back together with Grimes he threatened Morgan "If you break her heart, I break your everything." When Casey sees Alex leave Morgan's and Chuck's apartment one morning in one of Morgan's shirts, he intimidatingly confronts Morgan. Morgan initially attempts to deny his sexual component to his relationship with Alex but eventually explains that he cares deeply about Alex; Casey then releases his grip on Morgan and explains, "That's all I wanted to hear." Despite his love for Alex, he is uncomfortable expressing it in words and admonishes Morgan likewise to show it with actions rather than stating it in words. Alex tells Morgan over Casey's injured and comatose body that, while she's only known Casey a short time, she loves him very much; Morgan assures her that Casey loves her more than she can know.

=== Casey and Devon ===
Casey always considered Devon to be just a Frat boy, as Casey muttered "God, I hate this family" when alerted that Devon broke into (and got trapped in) Casey's apartment to ascertain why Casey was so interested in Chuck. Casey is only stopped from killing Devon by Sarah's timely arrival. After Morgan discovers Chucks secrets, Shaw insists that Morgan be placed into witness protection, against Chuck's objections. Casey is also unconvinced when Chuck points out Devon knows his secret as well (as Devon is "Awesome" and Morgan is a moron). Casey has no reservation against using Devon for his mission's needs. At Devon's bucksparty, he assists Agent Forrest into getting Devon's medical pass in a plot to find an Afghan terrorist.

Casey accepted Chuck's offer to attend Devon's and Ellie's engagement party hoping it was an open bar. After Ted Roark and Fulcrum gatecrash Devon and Ellie's wedding, ruining the reception and destroying the ceremony, Casey's Special Forces unit help by quickly organizing the beach-side wedding that Ellie had really wanted the entire time.

When Ellie is in labor, Casey reveals to Devon that he regrets missing his own daughter's birth, and advises Devon not to make the same mistake. Morgan and Alex later join Casey and the rest of the Bartowski clan outside the birthing suite. when a midwife asked if they were family, they all replied that they were.

=== Casey and Ellie ===
Though it starts relatively genial, Ellie and Casey's relationship becomes strained and uneasy at the start of Season Three, when Chuck protects Devon by lying to Ellie that Devon was getting Casey out of jail for being drunk and disorderly (Devon adds that Casey exposed and wet himself) during the time Devon was on a Ring mission to kill Shaw. Frequently in the third season, Ellie is distrustful of Casey, mentioning her being aware of his public indecency, and taking any alcohol away from him, much to Casey's constant confusion. While it plays primarily to the comedy of the series, the mistrust also allows the Ring to use Ellie later.

=== Casey and Gertrude ===
John Casey was given a romantic interest in Gertrude Verbanski, the head of Carmichael Industries' biggest spy competition, Verbanski Corp., said by Fedak to be "the best spy company in the world". Gertrude Verbanski is a former KGB agent and head of Verbanski Corp. She was once an adversary of John Casey, having disarmed him of his gun in Minsk, 1995 before they had a formal relationship in Season 5. She shares similar characteristics with John Casey; they are both cold, ruthless, and devoted to their chosen profession. They feel both have strong feelings towards one another, but both have trouble admitting it in the beginning, especially Casey. With the help of Sarah, Casey finally asks Gertrude out on a date. Gertrude later saves Casey by breaking him out of prison and by murdering Decker, who was behind the conspiracy that put Casey in prison. At the end of the series, Casey leaves Burbank to meet up with Gertrude in Dresden.
