= Joshua Gomez =

American actor (born 1975)

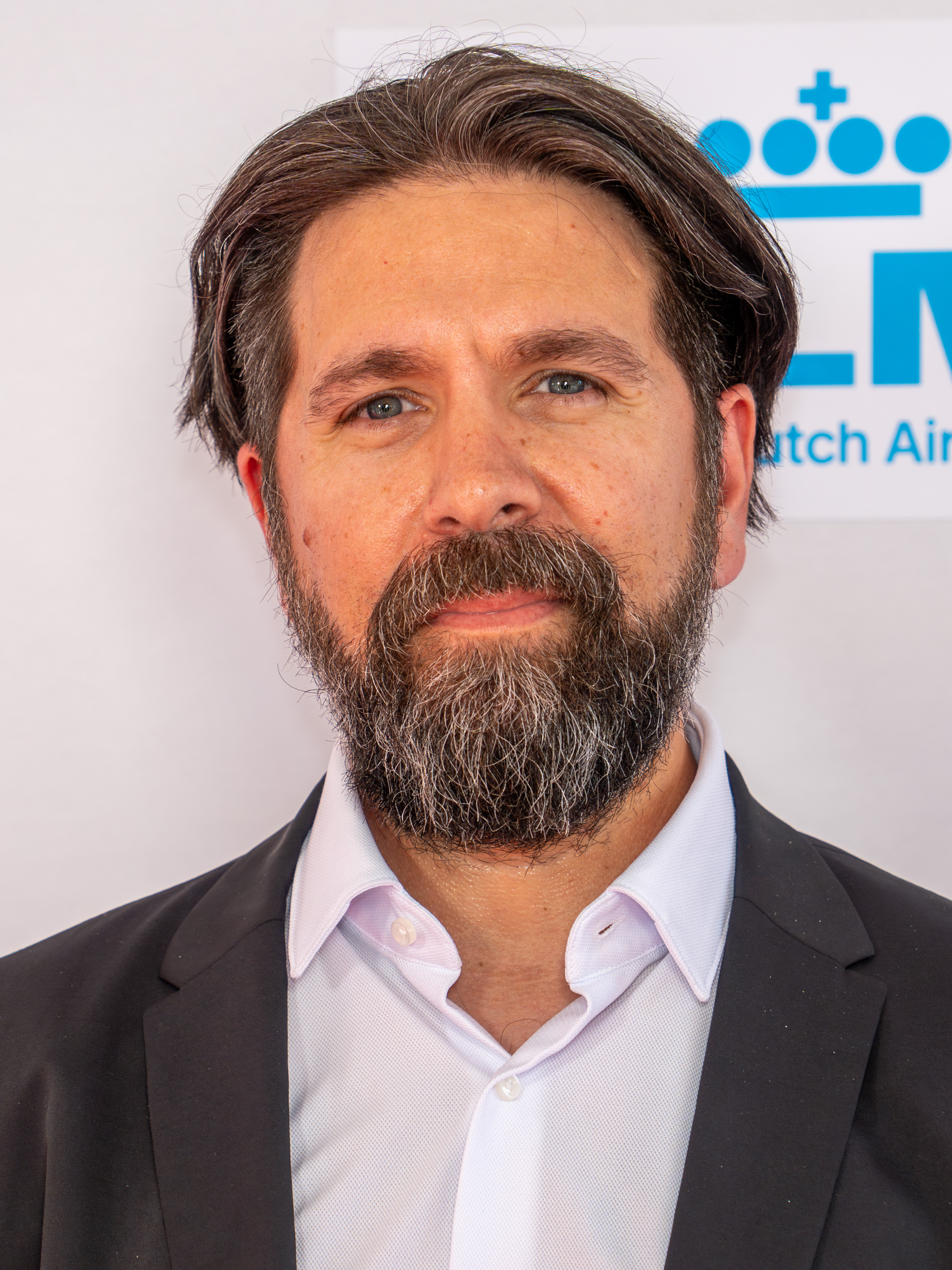
- Gomez at the 2025 Tribeca Festival
- Born: November 20, 1975 (age 51); Bayonne, New Jersey, U.S.
- Occupations: Actor, producer
- Years active: 2000–present
- Relatives: Rick Gomez (brother)

Joshua Gomez (born November 20, 1975) is an American actor best known for his role as Morgan Grimes on Chuck.

== Career ==
Born in Bayonne, New Jersey, he is the younger brother of actor Rick Gomez. Gomez appeared in a recurring role in the CBS series Without a Trace as computer tech James Mackeroy. He appeared in a series of IBM commercials, a series of Wendy's commercials (Ranch Tooth), and a commercial for Garmin. He also made a cameo on Freddy's Nightmares. He played Sammy Stinger in Bring It On Again, 2004.

As a voice actor, Gomez played Baralai in the video game Final Fantasy X-2, opposite his brother Rick's character, Gippal, and as Parker in Turok. He also had a small part at the beginning of BioShock as Johnny. In September 2007, he began starring in the NBC series Chuck as the title character's friend, Morgan Grimes. Gomez is friends with Chuck co-star Zachary Levi in real life. Joshua was nominated for Outstanding Male Performance in the Comedy Television Series at the 2008 ALMA Awards.

== Filmography ==
=== Film ===
Year	Title	Role	Notes
2003	Last Man Running	J.J.	
2004	Bring It On Again	Sammy Stinger	Direct-to-video
2014	Force of Execution	Iceman Gangbanger #9, Cartel #7, Strip Club Gangster #1	

=== Television ===
Year	Title	Role	Notes
2001	Law & Order	Edwin Morales	Episode: "Possession"
2005–06	Invasion	Scott	6 episodes
2005–06	Without a Trace	James Mackeroy	18 episodes
2007–12	Chuck	Morgan Grimes	Main role 91 episodes Nominated—ALMA Award for Outstanding Male Performance in a Comedy Series (2008); Nominated—ALMA Award for Outstanding Actor in a Comedy Series (2009); Nominated—ALMA Award for Outstanding Actor in a Comedy Series (2011)
2009	Imagination Movers	Captain Kiddo	Episode: "The Tale of Captain Kiddo"
2013	Castle	Simon Doyle	Episode: "Time Will Tell"
2014	The Crazy Ones	George	Episode: "Heavy Meddling"
2017	Scorpion	Dave Blakely	Episode: "Queen Scary"
2018	Lucifer	Neil Berger	Episode: "The Last Heartbreak"
2018	Man with a Plan	Snake Merchant	Episode: "The Burns System"
2023	Dave	Roger	Episode: "Harrison Ave"
2023	Minx	Simon	Episode: "It's okay to like it"

=== Video games ===
Year	Title	Role	Notes
2003	Final Fantasy X-2	Baralai	As Josh Gomez
2005	Call of Duty 2	Additional Voices	As Josh Gomez
2007	Armored Core 4	Celo	As Josh Gomez
2007	BioShock	Johnny, Pigskin Splicers	
2008	Turok	Parker	
