= List of Chuck characters =

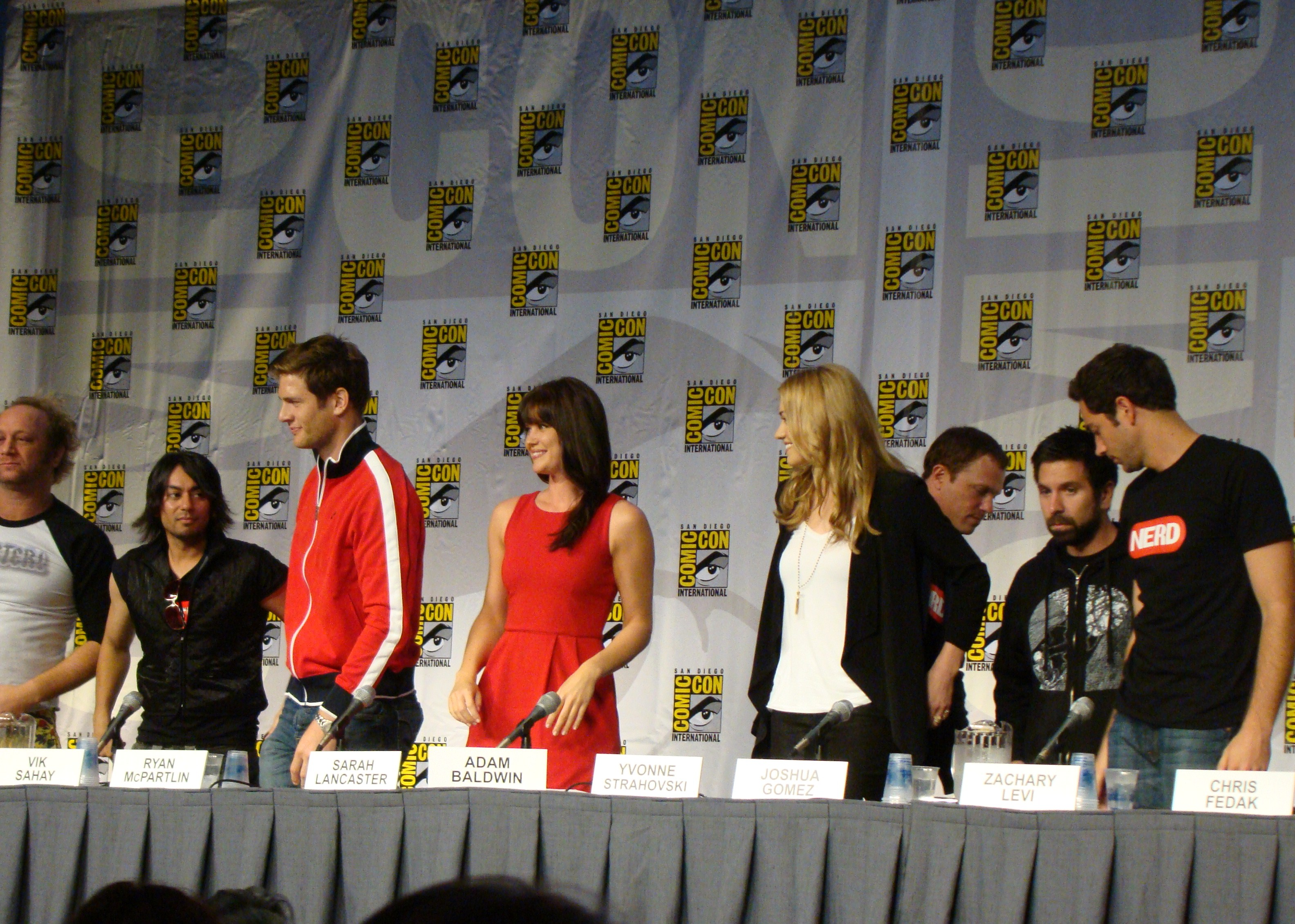
Chuck cast members at San Diego Comic-Con in 2010

Chuck is an American television series developed by writer/producers Josh Schwartz and Chris Fedak and is broadcast by NBC. The title character of the series is Chuck Bartowski (Zachary Levi), an affable and anxious Nerd Herd associate at Buy More who unwittingly downloads the entire CIA/NSA secret database subliminally into his brain. During the series he is protected by CIA agent Sarah Walker (Yvonne Strahovski) and NSA agent John Casey (Adam Baldwin) while helping the CIA and NSA in spy missions.

== Timeline ==
= Starring
= Recurring/Guest
= Archive footage or voiceovers

Character	Season				
Character	Season One (2007–2008)	Season Two (2008–2009)	Season Three (2010)	Season Four (2010–2011)	Season Five (2011–2012)
=== Main cast ===
Chuck Bartowski	Zachary Levi	Zachary Levi	Zachary Levi	Zachary Levi	Zachary Levi
Agent Sarah Walker	Yvonne Strahovski	Yvonne Strahovski	Yvonne Strahovski	Yvonne Strahovski	Yvonne Strahovski
Col. John Casey	Adam Baldwin	Adam Baldwin	Adam Baldwin	Adam Baldwin	Adam Baldwin
Morgan Grimes	Joshua Gomez	Joshua Gomez	Joshua Gomez	Joshua Gomez	Joshua Gomez
Dr. Ellie Woodcomb	Sarah Lancaster	Sarah Lancaster	Sarah Lancaster	Sarah Lancaster	Sarah Lancaster
Dr. Devon "Captain Awesome" Woodcomb	Ryan McPartlin	Ryan McPartlin	Ryan McPartlin	Ryan McPartlin	Ryan McPartlin
Michael "Big Mike" Tucker	Mark Christopher Lawrence	Mark Christopher Lawrence	Mark Christopher Lawrence	Mark Christopher Lawrence	Mark Christopher Lawrence
Jeff Barnes	Scott Krinsky	Scott Krinsky	Scott Krinsky	Scott Krinsky	Scott Krinsky
Lester Patel	Vik Sahay	Vik Sahay	Vik Sahay	Vik Sahay	Vik Sahay
Anna Wu	Julia Ling	Julia Ling	Julia Ling		
Brigadier General Diane Beckman	Bonita Friedericy	Bonita Friedericy	Bonita Friedericy	Bonita Friedericy	Bonita Friedericy
=== Other special agents and intelligence officers ===
Agent Bryce Larkin	Matt Bomer	Matt Bomer			
Director Langston Graham	Tony Todd	Tony Todd			Tony Todd
Cole Barker		Jonathan Cake			
Stephen J. Bartowski		Scott Bakula	Scott Bakula	Scott Bakula	
Agent Daniel Shaw			Brandon Routh		Brandon Routh
Mary Elizabeth Bartowski			Unknown woman	Linda Hamilton	Linda Hamilton
"Greta"				Olivia Munn, Isaiah Mustafa, Stacy Keibler, and Summer Glau	
Jane Bentley				Robin Givens	
Clyde Decker				Richard Burgi	Richard Burgi
Gertrude Verbanski					Carrie-Anne Moss
Nicholas Quinn					Angus Macfadyen
=== Other Buy More employees ===
Harry Tang	C. S. Lee				
Fernando	Jesse Heiman	Jesse Heiman	Jesse Heiman	Jesse Heiman	Jesse Heiman
Michael "Skip" Johnson	Michael Kawczynski	Michael Kawczynski	Michael Kawczynski	Michael Kawczynski	Michael Kawczynski
Mr. Mercer	David Burke	David Burke	David Burke		
Emmett Milbarge		Tony Hale	Tony Hale		
Hannah			Kristin Kreuk		
=== Other family members ===
Jack Burton		Gary Cole		Gary Cole	
Bolonia Grimes		Patricia Rae			
Dr. Honey Woodcomb		Morgan Fairchild		Morgan Fairchild	
Dr. Woody Woodcomb		Bruce Boxleitner			
Alex McHugh			Mekenna Melvin	Mekenna Melvin	Mekenna Melvin
Kathleen McHugh			Clare Carey	Clare Carey	
=== FULCRUM agents ===
Tommy Delgado	Anthony Ruivivar				
Jill Roberts		Jordana Brewster			
Alexander Winterborne		Mark Pellegrino			Mark Pellegrino
Vincent Smith		Arnold Vosloo			
Ted Roark		Chevy Chase			
=== The Ring agents ===
Ring Elders		Five unknown actors	Five unknown actors		
The Director			Mark Sheppard		
Justin Sullivan			Scott Holroyd		
=== Volkoff Industries ===
Alexei Volkoff				Timothy Dalton	
Vivian McArthur				Lauren Cohan	
Riley				Ray Wise	
=== Minor characters ===
Agent Carina Miller	Mini Andén		Mini Andén	Mini Andén	
Lou Palone	Rachel Bilson				
Roan Montgomery		John Larroquette		John Larroquette	
Heather Chandler		Nicole Richie		Nicole Richie	
Premier Alejandro Goya			Armand Assante	Armand Assante	
Hugo Panzer			"Stone Cold" Steve Austin	"Stone Cold" Steve Austin	
Evelyn Shaw			Kelly Thiebaud		
Adelbert "The Belgian" de Smet				Richard Chamberlain	
Zondra				Mercedes Masohn	

== Main and supporting characters ==
=== Special agents and intelligence officers ===
- Charles Irving "Chuck" Bartowski (Zachary Levi), the protagonist of the series, begins the series as an affable and anxious Nerd Herd associate at Buy More who unwittingly downloads the entire CIA/NSA secret database subliminally into his brain through an e-mail from old friend/nemesis Bryce Larkin, and must use his newly found knowledge to help the CIA and NSA in spy missions. He sometimes goes by the self-chosen alias and codename "Charles Carmichael." In "Chuck Versus the Final Exam" he passes his final spy test, and by "Chuck Versus the American Hero" he has been officially inducted into the CIA, although he was fired after going rogue in "Chuck Versus the Cliffhanger." He, alongside his new wife Sarah, choose to form a freelance spy company in the aftermath of the episode. First seen in: Chuck Versus the Intersect (Pilot)
- Sarah Walker (Yvonne Strahovski), whose real name is Sam and has lived under a series of assumed identities since childhood, is for most of the series a CIA agent whose mission is to protect the Intersect, and becomes Chuck's partner when he passes his final exam to be officially a spy. Little is known about her family, except that her father is a conman who was arrested during her teens. She is quite protective of her past. She is fired by the CIA alongside Chuck after his rogue operation in "Chuck Versus the Cliffhanger," but decides to form a freelance spy company with her new husband. First seen in: Chuck Versus the Intersect (Pilot)
- Colonel John Casey (Adam Baldwin) is an NSA agent, and is one of the agents assigned to guard the Intersect. Casey is promoted from Major to Colonel in "Chuck Versus the Colonel". He is dismissed for treason in "Chuck Versus the Tic Tac", but reinstated after his capture of the Ring director in "Chuck Versus the Other Guy". Casey joins Chuck and Sarah's spy company at the end of "Chuck Versus the Cliffhanger." First seen in: Chuck Versus the Intersect (Pilot)
- Brigadier General Diane Beckman, USAF (Bonita Friedericy) is the Director of the NSA and works for the Office of the Director of National Intelligence. Casey and Sarah report to her for Operation Bartowski, as does Chuck himself following his induction into the CIA. First seen in: Chuck Versus the Helicopter
- CIA Agent Bryce Larkin (Matthew Bomer) was Chuck's college roommate at Stanford. He joined the CIA in 2002, his and Chuck's junior year, then learned that the CIA intended to take Chuck on as an operative, as tests had shown that his brain was capable of processing a staggering amount of visual information. Fearing that working for the CIA would destroy his good-hearted friend, Bryce manufactured evidence that Chuck had cheated on the test, thus removing him from the CIA's recruitment list. Five years later, Bryce sent Chuck the Intersect because he knew that Chuck had the mental capacity to interpret it. Bryce is killed in "Chuck Versus the Ring" attempting to destroy the Intersect 2.0 . First seen in: Chuck Versus the Intersect (Pilot)
- CIA Agent Daniel Shaw (Brandon Routh) is a CIA officer assigned to assume command of Operation Bartowski during their pursuit of The Ring. He has tracked the organization for some time, and the operation has also led to the death of his wife, CIA agent Evelyn Shaw. In "Chuck Versus the American Hero" he is shown video footage by The Director that reveals Sarah killed his wife as part of her "Red Test." He defects to the Ring and is apparently shot and killed in Paris by Chuck at the climax of "Chuck Versus the Other Guy" when he threatens to kill Sarah in revenge. He is revealed to have survived in "Chuck Versus the Living Dead", and attempts to seize control of the CIA and NSA before being captured in "Chuck Versus the Ring: Part II." First seen in: Chuck Versus Operation Awesome
- CIA Director Langston Graham (Tony Todd) was a supervisory agent at the CIA. He recruited Sarah Walker after her father's arrest. He had seen Sarah's birth certificate and is thus is the only other recurring character presumed to have known her real name. He acted as Sarah's supervisor on her mission to protect Chuck. Agent Graham was killed during the events of "Chuck Versus The First Date" when the replacement Intersect exploded due to Fulcrum sabotage. First seen in: Chuck Versus the Intersect (Pilot)
- CIA Agent/Scientist Stephen J. Bartowski (Scott Bakula) is Ellie and Chuck's father, who left them eight years before the series began. At the end of the episode "Chuck Versus the Broken Heart," Sarah reveals she has located Stephen and takes Chuck to his mobile home located 100 miles east of Barstow, California. Mr. Bartowski, identified as a software genius (and later as Orion, chief architect of the Intersect supercomputer), does not appear until the following episode ("Chuck Versus the Dream Job"). Stephen reappeared in "Chuck Versus the Living Dead" and attempts to help Chuck control the malfunctioning Intersect, before being killed by Shaw in "Chuck Versus the Subway." First seen in: Chuck Versus the Predator (as Orion), "Chuck Versus the Dream Job" (as Stephen)
- CIA Agent Mary Elizabeth Bartowski (Linda Hamilton) is the estranged and long-lost mother of Chuck and Ellie. Very little is known about her other than that she left the family when Chuck was in the 5th Grade. In "Chuck Versus the Ring: Part II" a video recording left by Stephen after his death reveals that he has been waging a secret spy war and that everything he's done has been "for her." Mary's whereabouts are currently unknown, even to Stephen. However it has been revealed that her disappearance was actually the result of capture, and that for an undetermined period of time she was a hostage of Volkoff Industries. Later it is discovered that she went undercover for the CIA and acted as a double-agent, eventually gaining Volkoff's trust and becoming his favorite agent. Her code name is Frost. First seen in: Chuck Versus the Ring: Part II

=== Buy More employees ===
Current and former employees of the Buy More where Chuck and Casey worked for most of the series.

- Morgan Grimes (Joshua Gomez) is Chuck's best friend and, as of the fourth season, the manager of the Burbank Buy More. During the course of the series, he has progressed from "green shirt" salesman to assistant manager and ultimately store manager. As a green shirt, he tended to avoid work on the sales floor. His conflict with the scheming Emmett Milbarge and his "on-again, off-again" relationship with Anna Wu culminate in Morgan and Anna quitting Buy More and moving to Hawaii, but he returns well over six months later having lost both his dream job and Anna. Shortly thereafter, Big Mike promotes him to assistant manager. In "Chuck Versus the Beard" he discovers Chuck's secret spy life and his story as the intersect. When the government rebuilds the destroyed Buy More as a cover for an expanded Castle base, Morgan is rehired by Brigadier General / manager Diane Beckman as a green shirt, but appoints him store manager almost immediately. He begins a relationship with Casey's daughter Alex McHugh in season 4, to Casey's dismay. First seen in: Chuck Versus the Intersect (Pilot).
- Jeff Barnes (Scott Krinsky) is a member of the Nerd Herd specializing in Apple products. An alcoholic in his forties, he regularly schemes with Lester, with whom he forms a band called "Jeffster!" First seen in: Chuck Versus the Intersect (Pilot)
- Lester Patel (Vik Sahay) is a member of the Nerd Herd who specializes in Apple products and regularly schemes with Jeff. He was born in Canada and, despite being of Indian descent, raised in the Jewish religion. He and Jeff form the band "Jeffster!" in the second season. First seen in: Chuck Versus the Intersect (Pilot)
- Michael "Big Mike" Tucker (Mark Christopher Lawrence) is the manager of the Burbank Buy More, who for the first two seasons relied on a few others, including Chuck, to ensure that he worked (and dealt with his subordinates) as little as possible. After his wife divorced him, he began dating Morgan's mother. He was demoted to an ordinary Buy More salesman ("Green Shirt") as a result of a scheme by Emmett Milbarge, and following Emmett's disappearance he was promoted back to manager. In the episode Chuck Versus Santa Claus it is shown that Big Mike is a cousin to Al Powell (Reginald Vel Johnson), the officer who helped John McClane (Bruce Willis) in "Die Hard", when Powell shows up for the hostage situation at the Buy More. First seen in: Chuck Versus the Intersect (Pilot)
- Annabelle Melinda Wu (Julia Ling) worked for the Nerd Herd and is Morgan's girlfriend throughout the course of the first and second season. Anna is bisexual, skilled in martial arts, and defended Morgan against all of the Mighty Jock bullies in a cage match in "Chuck Versus the Break-Up." She moves to Hawaii with Morgan, but ultimately leaves him for another man. First seen in: Chuck Versus the Intersect (Pilot)
- Emmett Milbarge (Tony Hale) was the manager of the Buy More. He enters the store as an efficiency expert and is kept on as assistant manager. Emmett is promoted to the position of store manager of the Burbank Buy More after tricking Morgan and the other Buy More employees into making him look good while making "Big Mike" look bad. Emmett was murdered by an assassin searching for Chuck in the Buy More parking lot. First seen in: Chuck Versus Tom Sawyer
- Harold (Harry) Tiberius Tang (C.S. Lee) was a Buy More sales supervisor appearing at the beginning of the first season who applied for and received the Assistant Manager position, which he promptly used to lord over his subordinates. He stumbled upon Chuck, Sarah, and Casey video-conferencing with their superiors, so to keep him quiet, he was relocated by the U.S. government. First seen in: Chuck Versus the Intersect (Pilot)

=== Other friends and relatives ===
- Dr. Eleanor Faye "Ellie" Woodcomb (Sarah Lancaster) is Chuck's older sister and a physician. She is married to Dr. Woodcomb, whom she met at UCLA. First seen in: Chuck Versus the Intersect (Pilot)
- Dr. Devon Christian "Captain Awesome" Woodcomb (Ryan McPartlin) is Ellie's husband and a physician. He is referred to as Captain Awesome due to both his love of extreme sports (rock climbing, hang gliding, and "flossing" as Chuck says) as well as his constant use of the word to describe things ("Group hug?... [joins in]... awesome"). Devon became slightly suspicious of the activities of both Chuck and Casey toward the end of the second season, leading to his discovery of Chuck's spy life. Since then, he has helped to cover for Chuck. First seen in: Chuck Versus the Intersect (Pilot)
- Clara Woodcomb is the daughter of Devon and Ellie, and Chuck's niece. She was first named in "Chuck Versus the Gobbler," before being born in "Chuck Versus the Push Mix." The unborn child played a central part in subplots concerning Chuck's family life. First seen in: Chuck Versus the Push Mix.
- Alex McHugh is Morgan's girlfriend and the daughter of Casey. First seen in: Chuck versus the Tic Tac.

== Antagonists ==
=== The Ring ===
The Ring is a hostile organization introduced in passing in the season two finale, "Chuck Versus the Ring." The episode revealed no further information about the organization, other than that FULCRUM is only one part of it. According to Chris Fedak, the Ring has a specific goal revealed only as different from the goals of Fulcrum.

- The Director (Mark Sheppard) is the leader of The Ring. He first appeared in "Chuck Versus the American Hero," revealing that it was Sarah Walker who killed Shaw's wife, Evelyn, rather than one of his own agents. This caused Shaw to defect to the Ring, agreeing to pass them information on perfecting their own Intersect. The Director met up again with Shaw in Paris during the events of "Chuck Versus the Other Guy", only to be captured by Casey moments after receiving the information. First seen in: Chuck Versus the American Hero.

==== FULCRUM ====
FULCRUM is the codename of a hostile espionage organization which served as the series' main antagonist, and it was later revealed to be a part of The Ring.

- Dr. Jill Roberts (Jordana Brewster) was Chuck's girlfriend at Stanford. Bryce introduced Chuck and Jill as noting that Jill had a fondness for games such as Zork. After he was expelled Jill broke up with him, claiming to have started dating Bryce Larkin, and later obtained a Ph.D. in Biomedical Engineering. Five years and four months after they broke up, the two bump into each other at a technology conference at which she is presenting on behalf of the biotechnology company she works for and begin seeing each other again. Chuck reveals to her that he is a CIA agent. After decrypting a database, Casey and Sarah discover that Jill is a FULCRUM agent. She later admits that she and Larkin never actually dated. After being arrested Jill later returns and, with Chuck's help, escapes both FULCRUM and government control. First seen in: Chuck Versus the Ex.
- Ted Roark (Chevy Chase) was the founder and CEO of Roark Instruments and is the nemesis of Stephen J. Bartowski. He is credited with creating some of today's most successful computer technologies but stole many of Stephen's ideas as his own when they were graduate school classmates. Though a major media figure, he is in charge of creating the new Intersect for Fulcrum. He captures Stephen, now revealed as Orion, and threatens to kill his family unless he helps him finish the Intersect. Stephen covertly double-crosses him and reprograms the computer to instead remove the Intersect images from Chuck's head when Roark tries to use it to upload the Intersect into a group of Fulcrum agents. After Beckman's airstrike begins, Roark flees and surprisingly survives the attack. He comes to Ellie's wedding, threatening to kill Ellie if Chuck doesn't turn over the Intersect, but is thwarted by Chuck, Sarah, Stephen, Bryce Larkin, and a special forces team led by John Casey. They arrest Roark and detain him in a cell in Castle, but he is executed by a member of Casey's team who is actually a member of the Ring. First seen in: Chuck Versus the Dream Job.

=== Volkoff Industries ===
Volkoff Industries is the public business front owned by an international arms dealer named Alexei Volkoff. They maintained a headquarters building in a former KGB installation in Moscow, and possess other known assets in Venezuela and Hong Kong. Like The Ring and Fulcrum before it, Volkoff Industries is the central antagonist of Chuck's fourth season. Little other specific information has been revealed so far in the series, other than that they use a number of other companies as public fronts for their arms shipments. Casey and Sarah had spent several months prior to "Chuck Versus the Anniversary" on assignment attempting to track down the organization, and it has been revealed that Volkoff Industries is somehow tied to the disappearance of Mary Elizabeth Bartowski. Volkoff has established an underground weapons pipeline called "Project Beacon," which extends to Burma and Costa Gravas. Beacon includes a stolen nuclear controlled panel that could have bombed several American cities. Volkoff has been present in the series as early as "Chuck Versus the Cougars," when Heather Chandler attempts to extort F-22 plans from her husband for Volkoff (revealed when Hugo Panzer was hired to kill her for the failure). Volkoff's ability to manipulate prison transfers, relationship with Mary, and former connections to the Soviet Union would suggest a far-reaching political power. Volkoff has a valuable database named Hydra.

- Alexei Volkoff (Timothy Dalton) is the head of Volkoff Industries. For the first six episodes of Season 4, Volkoff was an unseen character, directing his operatives from behind the scenes. Mary Bartowski was ordered by the CIA to track him down when she was placed under cover in his organization under Project ISIS. It was first revealed in "Chuck Versus the Ring: Part II," and over the course of the first part of the fourth season, that Stephen had spent the last 20 years since Mary's disappearance privately attempting to track down and stop him. Chuck, Sarah and Casey are later assigned to this same task by General Beckman. Volkoff first appears in person in the seventh episode of season four, "Chuck Versus the First Fight." Chuck first meets him masquerading as "Gregory Tuttle," Frost's enthusiastic, if bumbling and completely inexperienced in the matters of field-work, MI6 handler. With Chuck's assistance, "Tuttle" escapes several Volkoff agents and helps Chuck recover data that would clear Mary and prove she has been working deep undercover to bring down his organization. However, after being apparently wounded in a gunfight while recovering the disks, Volkoff follows Chuck, Sarah and Mary to Stephen Bartowski's base of operations and reveals himself, explaining that the entire operation was a plan to locate and destroy Stephen's intelligence. He attempted to kill Chuck and Sarah in the explosion that destroyed Stephen's work, but was unknowingly betrayed by Mary, who left a means for them to escape. In "Chuck Versus the Push Mix he was arrested. It is revealed in "Chuck Versus the Leftovers" that he is in love with Mary (Frost) Bartowski. "Chuck Versus Agent X" reveals that Volkoff was a scientist named Harley Winterbottom who became Volkoff after being the first test subject for The Intersect. First seen in: Chuck Versus the First Fight.
- Vivian McArthur Volkoff (Lauren Cohan) is Volkoff's daughter and chosen successor. She had no knowledge of her father's criminal organization, having believed her whole life that he was an oil company executive. Team Bartowski is ordered to protect her when Boris Kaminsky begins a killing spree in search of a key to unlock a part of Volkoff's office and claim the company. When Boris confronts her, he reveals that Vivian's entire life, including martial arts training, target practice and learning multiple languages, her father had been about preparing her for the spy world. After shooting Boris with a shotgun at point-blank range, Vivian goes alone to the Volkoff Industries headquarters in Moscow and unlocks a compartment with a locket from her father, revealing a card to access Volkoff's vault at the First Bank of Macau, which contain various pictures of Vivian's life. Although Vivian initially declines her father's legacy, she is later shown to have joined his lawyer Riley, and they drive away to learn the truth about her father. She then hires a CIA agent named Damien to kill Chuck for $10 million, effectively becoming Chuck's nemesis.

=== Verbanski Corporation ===
Verbanski Corporation is the main competition to Carmichael Industries, the freelance spy organization operated by Chuck and his colleagues, in season 5.

- Gertrude Verbanski (Carrie-Anne Moss) is the head of a rival, successful freelance security/espionage firm and a former rival to John Casey, illustrated by one of Casey's guns mounted in her office as a trophy. Her initial actions against Carmichael Industries were to steal the two most prominent assets of Chuck's team: Sarah, for her experience; Morgan, for the Intersect. However, Verbanski's feelings towards Casey led her to soften her attempt at a hostile takeover of Carmichael Industries; and, after Casey is arrested, ally herself with Chuck and Sarah in an attempt to free him in "Chuck Versus the Hack Off". She admits to Sarah that she loves Casey. Like Casey, Verbanski is hostile and doesn't hesitate to use violence to solve problems. When working with Chuck and Sarah, Verbanski's demeanor and attitude is shockingly similar to Casey's, as she growls at Chuck and Sarah, poisons a suspect with ipecac-laced jelly beans to get him to throw up in order to retrieve a drive that the suspect swallowed, and verbally abuses Chuck. Chuck's reaction is to state, "It's as though Casey never left."

== Guest stars ==
- William Abadie as Guy Lafleur
- Lori Alan as Judy Roberts
- Theo Alexander as Stavros Demetrios
- Fahim Anwar as Manoosh Depak
- Anthony Azizi as Sheik Rajiv Ahmad
- Diedrich Bader as Del
- Greg Baine as Special Agent Ben Katz
- Dave Bautista as T.I.
- India de Beaufort as Jasmine
- Lorena Bernal as La Ciudad
- Jerome Bettis as Jimmy Butterman
- Alexa Blair as young Sarah Walker
- Kyle Bornheimer as Hunter Perry
- Lesley-Ann Brandt as Fatima Tazi
- Ben Browder as Ron
- Yvette Nicole Brown as a Buy More employee
- Kevin Patrick Burke as Magnus Einerson
- Erin Cahill as Quinn's agent
- Tasha Campbell as Daughter
- Larry Cedar as an interviewer
- Sanjay Chandani as Mason Whitney
- François Chau as Guillermo Chan
- Bianca Chiminello as Juliette
- Ewan Chung as Lee Cho
- Graham Clarke as Sebastian Carlisle
- Melinda Clarke as Sasha Banicheck
- Katie Cleary as Laura
- Tug Coker as Miles
- Emy Coligado as Poppy Tang
- Greg Collins as General Bauer
- Mo Collins
- Andrew Connolly as Jack Artman
- Christopher Cousins as Bill Bergey
- Fred Cross as Roni Eimacher
- Roger Cross as Ring agent
- Kevin Daniels as Ellyas Abshir
- Eddie Davenport as Agent Rosenbaum
- Josie Davis as Serena
- Ken Davitian as Bernie Ominsky
- Brooklyn Decker as a job applicant
- Catherine Dent as Jane Robertson
- Tim DeKay as Kieran Ryker
- Bo Derek as herself
- Mark Derwin as Detective Conway
- Noureen DeWulf as Lizzie Shafai
- Neil Dickson as MI6 agent
- Jack Dimich as Timur
- Omar Dorsey as St. Germaine
- Michael Clarke Duncan as Colt
- Vincent Duvall as Duncan
- Dale Dye as General Stanfield
- Robert Englund as Dr. Stanley Wheelwright
- Kevin Fabian as Barry Greenfield
- Jeff Fahey as Karl Sneijder
- Mel Fair as a TV Reporter
- Jean-Christophe Febbrari as Pierre Melville
- Nina Fehren as Vixen
- Alex Fernandez as Commandante Juan Pablo Turrini
- Lou Ferrigno as a Volkoff bodyguard
- John Fleck as Dr. Jonas Zarnow
- Eduardo Garcia as Premier Alejandro Goya's Head of security
- Beau Garrett as Cult leader
- Ana Gasteyer as Dasha
- James Francis Ginty as Lewis
- Mary Pat Gleason as Morgue clerk
- Nicholas Guilak as Achmed Gambir
- Mark Hamill as Jean-Claude
- Angie Harmon as Sydney Prince
- Justin Hartley as Wesley Sneijder
- Tricia Helfer as Alex Forrest
- Sonita Henry as Dr. Ayub
- Lawrence Hilton-Jacobs as President Jakaya Kuti
- Rick Hoffman as Agent Scary
- James Hong as Ben Lo Pan
- Jeffrey Hutchinson as an auctioneer
- Jennifer Jalene as "Smooth" Lau
- Peter Jason as General Merriweather
- Igor Jijikine as Armand
- Wesley John as Needles
- Sterling Jones as young John Casey
- Vinnie Jones as Karl Stromberg
- John Kapelos as Yari Demitrios
- Darren Keefe as Yeager
- George Ketsios as Paulie Klug
- Roland Kickinger as a Volkoff security guard
- Udo Kier as Otto von Vogel
- Craig Kilborn as Roger Bale
- Patrick Kilpatrick as Leader
- Yuriana Kim as Mrs. Wu
- Andre Kincaid as K.K.
- James Kiriyama-Lem as Ambassador Mei Sheng
- Andrew Kirsanov as Anatoli Zevlovski
- Timur Kocak as Necati Acar a.k.a. "The Turk"
- David Koechner as Crazy Bob
- Mousa Kraish as Damien
- Brian Kubach as Drew
- Pooja Kumar as Jinsana
- Karolína Kurková as Sofia Stepanova
- Swoosie Kurtz as Laura Turner
- Clyde Kusatsu as Mr. Morimoto
- Carlos Lacamara as Juan Diego Arnaldo
- Cheryl Ladd as Emma
- Eric Lange as Colin Davis
- Katrina Law as Alexis White
- David H. Lawrence XVII as Marvin
- David S. Lee as Boris Kaminsky
- Stan Lee as himself
- James Lew as Anand Chanarong
- Andrew C. Lim as Joe Lucky
- Christopher Lloyd as Dr. Leo Dreyfus
- Lisa LoCicero as Daphne Peralta
- Louis Lombardi as Scotty
- Lela Loren as Elia
- Allan Louis as Dr. Martin Kowambe
- Henri Lubatti as Nicos Vassilis
- Carl Lumbly as Ty Bennett
- Dolph Lundgren as Marco
- Aaron Lustig as a government scientist
- Pasha D. Lychnikoff as Victor Federov
- Sonya Macari as Antonia
- Kevin Makely as Bruno Klug
- Wendy Makkena as National Intelligence Director
- Braeden Marcott as a wine enthusiast
- Adoni Maropis as Javier Cruz
- Millicent Martin as Mrs. Winterbottom
- Monet Mazur as Barbara
- Jenny McCarthy as Sylvia Arculin
- Bob McCracken as Julius Burrow
- Johnny Messner as Rafe Gruber
- Ivana Miličević as Ilsa Trinchina
- Dominic Monaghan as Tyler Martin
- Mircea Monroe as Amy
- Joel David Moore as MacKintosh
- Luisa Moraes as Vixen
- Timothy V. Murphy as the Klug's father
- Peter Onorati as Wally Roberts
- Nickolas Pajon as Vuc Andric
- Robert Patrick as Col. James Keller
- Andy Pessoa as young Morgan Grimes
- Jim Pirri as Father
- Lou Diamond Phillips as Augusto Gaez
- Robert Picardo as Dr. Howard Busgang
- Jim Piddock as Museum curator
- Bronson Pinchot as Victor
- Danny Pudi as Vali Chandrasekaren
- Alexis Raich as Suzie O'Keefe
- Jed Rees as Nathan "Ned" Rhyerson
- Lee Reherman as Agent Simms
- David Reynolds as Christoph
- Andy Richter as Brad White
- Rob Riggle as Agent Jim Rye
- Eric Roberts as Packard
- Marco Rodriguez as Rocky Falcone
- Greg Roman as Stanley Fitzroy
- Rebecca Romijn as Robyn Cunnings
- Michael Rooker as Lt. Frank Mauser
- Matt Roth as a Buy More employee
- Pamela Roylance as Sarah's grandmother
- Joshua Rush as young Chuck Bartowski
- Jonathan Sadowski as Laszlo Manhovski
- Ben Savage as Mark Ratner
- Stefanie Scott as young Sarah Walker
- Hope Shapiro as Bunny
- Todd Sherry as Dr. Fred Hornblower
- Gianna Simone as Ms. Gehrlich
- Alison Simpson as Vanessa White
- Tony Sirico as Matty
- Jon Sklaroff as Dragan Pichushkin
- Michael Bailey Smith as Vlad
- Scott Alan Smith as Professor George Fleming
- Harry Dean Stanton as Harry
- Michael Strahan as Mitt
- Christian Svensson as Frank
- Faran Tahir as Farrokh Bulsara
- Jim Tavaré
- Tia Texada as Hortencia Goya
- Iqbal Theba as Peyman Alahi
- Brian Thompson as Cliff Arculin
- Grant Thompson as Allan Watterman
- Trevor Torseth as Ring agent
- Shaun Toub as Mohammed Zamir
- Steve Valentine as Von Hayes
- Karissa Vacker as Josie
- Reginald VelJohnson as Sergeant Al Powell
- Torsten Voges as Dr. Mueller
- Michael Weaver as Dick Duffy
- Kevin Weisman as Riordan Payne
- Kevin West as Lewis "Merlin" Charles
- Fred Willard as Craig Turner
- Thom Williams as Franz Klug
- Matthew Willig as Yuri the Gobbler
- Matt Winston as Barclay
- Michael Wiseman as Lon Kirk
- Ian Wolterstorff as Dale
- Freddie Wong as Freddie
- Ping Wu as Mr. Wu
- Jack Yang as Jason Wang
- Cedric Yarbrough as Neil
- Gwendoline Yeo as Mei-Ling Cho
