= Chuck Versus the Imported Hard Salami =

- Chuck episode
- Sarah and Chuck kiss while in danger.
- Episode no.: Season 1 Episode 9
- Directed by: Jason Ensler
- Written by: Scott Rosenbaum; Metthew Miller
- Production code: 3T6458
- Original air date: November 19, 2007

Guest appearances
- Theo Alexander as Stavros Demitrios; Rachel Bilson as Lou Palone; Matthew Bomer as Bryce Larkin; Bonita Friedericy as Diane Beckman; John Kapelos as Yari Demitrios; Anthony Ruivivar as Tommy Delgado; Scott Krinsky as Jeff Barnes; Vik Sahay as Lester Patel; Julia Ling as Anna Wu

Episode chronology
← Previous "Chuck Versus the Truth"	Next → "Chuck Versus the Nemesis"

"Chuck Versus the Imported Hard Salami" is episode nine of the first season of Chuck. It aired on NBC on November 19, 2007. Chuck is ordered by General Beckman to take advantage of his new girlfriend, Lou, to get close to her smuggler ex-boyfriend, while Morgan looks for a girlfriend of his own.

== Plot summary ==
=== Main Plot ===
At a dock in Helsinki, Finland, a crane is loading a storage container for transport. The crane operator nearly drops his container and is warned by an armed man on the ground to be careful because the contents are live. Inside the crate, a clock is counting down, with 72 hours remaining. In Burbank, Chuck announces his intentions to break up with Sarah to Morgan, who doesn't believe him. Sarah arrives and the two discuss the situation in the Home Theater room. She doesn't believe the breakup is a good idea, but Chuck insists he needs a real relationship. Sarah relents, and begins to cry and leaves the store to sell the breakup. Back at Casey's apartment, Beckman expresses her concerns about the breakup, and is alarmed Chuck is dating a civilian on whom they have no information. Beckman demands more information on Lou (Rachel Bilson) before she can get too close, meanwhile, Chuck and Lou make out in the Herder while on a date. Lou takes him into the deli to make him a sandwich, where Chuck flashes on an invitation to a party at Club Ares, which is owned by Lou's Greek ex-boyfriend, Stavros Demetrios (Theo Alexander).

Beckman informs the team that Stavros is part of the Demetrios smuggling family, and orders Chuck to use his relationship with Lou to get close to him and investigate a package they believe that the Demetrios family is bringing into the country. Chuck objects but has no choice, so he asks Lou about meeting Stavros, to head off any possible trouble with him later. Sarah and Casey fit Chuck with a listening device and an ear bug, and watch from the van while Chuck and Lou visit Club Ares. Lou introduces Chuck to Stavros, and the three retire to his VIP booth. Sarah is anxious about leaving Chuck in the club alone, but Casey implies her feelings for Chuck are more than professional. Sarah denies this, but when Stavros makes comments she hears as threatening, Sarah leaves the van to check on him. Lou sees her, and Chuck confronts Sarah for interfering. Lou gets upset and leaves, but before he can follow, Chuck flashes as Stavros' father Yari (John Kapelos) arrives. He tries to get back to the VIP booth where the two are meeting, but the bouncer blocks him. He leaves the listening device on a tray of drinks, heading into the booth and heads off to catch Lou before she can leave, but she departs in a cab.

The next day at work, Chuck calls Lou but she does not answer. Casey and Sarah tell him that they learned the location of dock where the smuggled container is arriving, and will be raiding it that day. Sarah apologizes for ruining his date with Lou and hints to him that she likes gerber daisies. Chuck heads to the deli with a bouquet and waits, but Lou refuses to see him without a number. After all the other customers leave, she accepts his apology. At the docks, Casey and Sarah lead the team to confiscate the container, but when they open it all they find is a camera. Yari realizes they had been discovered, and demands to know who planted the bug. Stavros recognizes the bug as belonging to Chuck.

Chuck wakes up the next day after making up with Lou. Casey and Sarah let him know that they were set up and the container was empty. Surveillance photos of Club Ares show Lou talking with Stavros, so the team heads back to stakeout the club. Lou arrives and Chuck leaves the van to follow her. She meets with Stavros and he delivers a crate then leaves. Chuck confronts her and breaks it open, revealing it is filled with imported deli meats smuggled through customs. Lou angrily admits to smuggling it, and Chuck ditches his watch so the transmitter doesn't pick up her confession. Sarah follows him when Chuck doesn't return, and arrives after Lou leaves. The two are captured by Stavros and several gunmen, who throw them in the trunk of his car and drive off. Casey investigates and finds Chuck's watch. He heads to the deli and coerces Lou into giving him the location of Stavros' dock in exchange for immunity for her own smuggling activities.

Chuck and Sarah are taken to the dock, and Yari demands to know who they work for and threatens to torture Sarah if Chuck doesn't answer. Chuck takes advantage of flashes on two of Yari's men to distract them long enough for Sarah to break free of her restraints. She sees Casey arrive, and she coordinates an attack on Yari's men while Casey opens fire. Sarah and Chuck escape to find the container while Casey and a government team engage Yari and his men in a firefight. Casey runs down Yari, but before he can apprehend him, Yari is shot by a sniper, (Anthony Ruivivar) who makes a call warning someone on the other end they have a problem. Meanwhile, Sarah and Chuck locate the container. They open it, and finds a bomb-like device with a counting down timer. After Chuck fails to flash, Sarah orders Chuck to run but he refuses to leave her. Just as the timer expires she kisses him, but the countdown expires and nothing happens, leaving them in an awkward (for Sarah) moment.

Chuck and Lou break up, and Chuck returns to work the next day. He calls Sarah and leaves her a voicemail asking her out on a real date. Sarah and Casey are watching the government team working on the container, who announce that the timer was not a bomb, but measuring an air supply. The container is opened to reveal Bryce Larkin, who takes a breath.

=== Buy More ===
Lester watches Sarah leave the Buy More after their breakup and decides he's going to go after her. He follows her to the Wienerlicious to ask her out, but Sarah scares him off with over-aggressive advances. Seeing that Chuck already has a girlfriend after breaking up with Sarah, Morgan decides he needs a girlfriend too. Jeff mentions he intends to go after Anna, but she tells him off saying she'd rather hook up with Morgan. When Morgan tries to kiss her in the Home Theater room later she rebuffs him, leaving Morgan afraid she'll tell everyone. He does so himself when he misinterprets Anna, Jeff and Lester laughing about Chuck being in trouble with Lou so soon after breaking up with Sarah, and Jeff and Lester begin teasing him unmercifully. Anna feels sorry for him, so later while he's watching a movie in the Home Theater room she kisses him.

== Production ==
"Chuck Versus the Imported Hard Salami" is part of the show's first multi-part story arc, continuing directly from "Chuck Versus the Truth."

This episode is the first appearance of a Fulcrum agent in the series, although the organization would not be identified until the following episode. Anthony Ruivivar appears as Tommy Delgado, who takes out Yari Stavros from a rooftop some distance away. Ruivivar reprises his role in "Chuck Versus the Nemesis."

=== Production details ===
- Sarah removed the container's keypad when she and Chuck go to work on it. Afterwards, in the close ups of the timer, the keypad is back on while in the long shots, the keypad is off.
- When Chuck throws his guitar pin listening device toward the tray of drinks, it lands in a shot glass full of red liquid. When the tray is placed on the table, the pin is now sitting on the tray beside the glass.
- When Chuck and Sarah are arguing in the trunk of Stavros' car, you can see a flashlight shining on Chuck's face.

=== Flashes ===
- Chuck flashes on the invitation to Club Ares hanging up in Lou's deli.
- When Yari Demetrios enters Club Ares, Chuck has a flash identifying him.
- Chuck flashes on two of the Demetrios' henchmen. He uses the details he learned to distract them, as one of the men cheated the other out of money paid out for a hit.

== Reception ==
IGN scored the episode an 8.7 out of 10, particularly touting the scene between Sarah and Lester at the Wienerlicious. However they were less thrilled about the revealing of Bryce. Although the reviewer appreciated the manner in which the revelation was made and the impact Bryce's return would have on the show, promotion of the episode heavily focused on a surprising twist while showing the container opening. Matthew Bomer's name was also listed in the guest credits at the top of the episode, further spoiling the ending. Total Sci-Fi also echoes the spoiling of the ending.

TVSquad felt the Buy More plot was underdeveloped, but that Morgan was beginning to evolve and come into his own as a character. The ending of Chuck and Lou's relationship was also criticized as somewhat abrupt.

"Chuck Versus the Imported Hard Salami" drew 7.8 million viewers, for a score of 3.1.

== References to popular culture ==
- After witnessing Chuck's perceived dumping of Sarah, Lester and Jeff reference the Pat Benatar song "Heartbreaker", altering the lyrics to "Heartbreaker, dream maker, love-taker, don't you mess around with Chuck."
