= Chuck Bartowski =

Fictional protagonist of TV show Chuck

- Chuck character
- Zachary Levi as Chuck Bartowski
- First appearance: "Chuck Versus the Intersect"
- Last appearance: "Chuck Versus the Goodbye"
- Portrayed by: Zachary Levi (Original); Joshua Rush (Young)

In-universe information
- Aliases: Charles Carmichael; The Intersect (codename); Piranha (hacker); Caleb Vega (roommate) François Espoir (french agent)
- Nicknames: Chuck, Chuckles
- Gender: Male
- Title: Special Agent
- Occupation: Former CIA Agent; Nerd Herd Supervisor; Owner of the Burbank Buy More & Private intelligence company (Carmichael Industries)
- Family: Dr. Ellie Bartowski-Woodcomb (sister); Stephen J. Bartowski (father; deceased); Mary Elizabeth Bartowski (mother); Dr. Devon Woodcomb (brother-in-law); Clara Woodcomb (niece); Jack Burton (father-in-law); Jesse Gunter (maternal grandfather); Mary Gunter (maternal grandmother)
- Spouse: Sarah Lisa Bartowski
- Born: September 18, 1981
- Affiliation: Central Intelligence Agency; Operation Bartowski; Buy More; Carmichael Industries; Morgan Grimes (best friend, partner-turned-employee); Sarah Walker (partner/wife); John Casey (partner-turned-employee); Brigadier General M. Diane Beckman (former commanding officer)
- Expertise: Computer expert and genius level intellect; Exceptionally high rate of subliminal information retention; Engineering and Electronics Expert (Engineering Diploma attained from Stanford University in 2008); Espionage and self-defense training; Strong marksmanship skills (honed through Duck Hunt); Intersect provides instantaneous access to high-level classified government information (Level 6 Clearance) and advanced skills via "flashes".
- Education: Stanford University

Charles Irving Bartowski is the title character of the American spy show Chuck on NBC. He is portrayed by Zachary Levi.

== Character profile ==
At the outset of the show, Chuck Bartowski is presented as a twenty-something underachiever who lives in the Echo Park neighborhood of Los Angeles, California and works at a dead end job at the Burbank Buy More in its Nerd Herd division (a fictionalized Geek Squad). Chuck's life stalled after his college roommate, Bryce Larkin, planted test answers under Chuck's bed and then reported him to the officials, which led to Chuck's expulsion from Stanford University (where he was a scholarship student) in 2002; only twelve credits shy of completing his Bachelor of Engineering degree. For a long time, Chuck hated Bryce for his betrayal, but he later learns that Bryce got him expelled to protect him from being recruited into the CIA because he knew Chuck wouldn't survive in the field. He also lost his college girlfriend, Jill Roberts (Jordana Brewster). Following his expulsion, Chuck moved in with his sister and began working at the Burbank, California branch of Buy More. At some point over the next five years Chuck becomes the Nerd Herd supervisor.

That's his job at the time of the pilot, when the viewers are introduced to the key people in Chuck's current life: his older sister, Eleanor Fay "Ellie" Bartowski, M.D. (Sarah Lancaster), her live-in boyfriend, Devon "Captain Awesome" Woodcomb (Ryan McPartlin) and Chuck's best friend since childhood, Morgan Grimes. Very little else is known about his family. His mother left when Chuck was in the fifth grade and his father was "never really around" even before he also left (roughly eleven years ago), so Chuck and Ellie increasingly had to fend for themselves.

On his birthday in 2007, Chuck opens an email from Bryce Larkin that causes Chuck to download into his brain the full contents of a CIA/NSA supercomputer known as the Intersect, which has served as a database for their combined collected intelligence. Unbeknownst to Chuck, the Intersect computer has been destroyed, making his brain the only location of this top-secret information. The government learns that Chuck Bartowski was the last known person that Bryce Larkin contacted, so both the CIA and NSA (independent of each other) send agents to find him. The CIA dispatches field officer Sarah Walker (Yvonne Strahovski) to retrieve a copy of the Intersect, while the NSA sends then-Major John Casey (Adam Baldwin) to capture Chuck. The two agents eventually cross paths, and Sarah fends off Casey. They then discover that Chuck is a human version of the Intersect who sees a rapid-fire series of images (or "flashes") of intelligence from the Intersect database whenever his brain recognizes a bit of related information with his own eyes or ears. The two agencies conclude that Chuck must be protected and assign Sarah and Casey jointly to the task.

== Series development ==
Chuck is the lead character on the show. Thus, major seasonal plot arcs generally revolve around the weekly missions that Chuck, Sarah and Casey engage in, as well as Chuck's relationships with Morgan Grimes (his best friend and co-worker), his fellow Nerd Herders and co-workers, his sister Ellie and her boyfriend (later husband) Devon. Chuck is also very worried about his future and wants desperately to remove the Intersect from his brain, although by the beginning of season three he has come to accept his role as the Intersect. Chuck is often involved in the major and secondary episodic plots and the two sometimes intertwine.

=== Sarah Walker ===
A major thread throughout the series is that Chuck is in love with his CIA protector Sarah, who is pretending to be his girlfriend as part of her cover story. The two characters continue to become closer despite frequent setbacks and constant resistance due to their circumstances.

Sarah is depicted as slower to recognize her own feelings toward Chuck than the other way around, and for various reasons has been reluctant to voice her feelings. Despite Sarah characteristically hiding her real feelings, several other characters have detected a genuine attraction and pointed it out, as early as "Chuck Versus the Wookiee" when Carina (Mini Anden), who is familiar with Sarah, tells Chuck that Sarah wants him, though she probably doesn't even know it yet.

Sarah and Chuck have shared kisses under unusual circumstances in "Chuck Versus the Imported Hard Salami" and "Chuck Versus the Seduction". In the former case, Sarah kisses Chuck seconds before the countdown on what they believe to be a bomb reaches zero. In the latter case, Seduction trainer Roan Montgomery (John Larroquette) quickly discerned that there was more than a working relationship between Chuck and Sarah.

Sarah maintains that it would be unprofessional of her to actually engage in a real relationship with Chuck while she is serving as his CIA handler, and indeed her feelings for him have proven to be a liability at times, placing the mission and both of their lives at risk.

Complicating the developing relationship between Chuck and Sarah are a series of love triangles.

The longest-running triangle involved Chuck's nemesis Bryce Larkin, who was previously partnered with Sarah and developed a romantic relationship with her which he still wishes to pursue. During Bryce's return in "Chuck Versus the Nemesis", Sarah is clearly torn between Larkin and Chuck. However, when he later reappears in "Chuck Versus the Break-Up", the situation has changed. Sarah chooses Chuck's safety over their assigned mission objectives, and when later confronted by Captain Awesome (who correctly and unknowingly recognized that Sarah's feelings for Chuck are genuine and not part of her cover), Bryce realizes that Sarah has chosen Chuck. At the end of the mission, Bryce warns Chuck that her feelings nearly got both her and Chuck killed, and have interfered with her performance. Bryce claims that in this, as always, he is looking out for Chuck, and challenges Chuck to "do the right thing" as usual. Chuck acquiesces and tells Sarah that regardless of how they feel towards each other, they can never be together.

Sarah also has a minor love triangle with Cole Barker, an MI6 agent who, like Bryce, contrasts with Chuck—he is a skilled spy who excels in combat, has a high tolerance for pain and a suave personality. Chuck is of course afraid that Sarah will fall for him. However, when Cole asks Sarah to board a jet to Fiji with him, Sarah turns him down. Cole says "What's the matter I thought you were a girl who liked adventure." Sarah then says "I guess I'm not the type of girl who cheats on her cover boyfriend (Chuck)." Cole then asks her if that's all Chuck is to her, saying that he saw the way she looked at him when he was in danger. Sarah then says: "When you meet somebody you care about it's just hard to walk away." Making it obvious she is in love with Chuck.

The other two love triangles involved Chuck seeking a real relationship, with Lou the sandwich girl (Rachel Bilson) and later with his ex-girlfriend Jill Roberts. In both cases, Sarah becomes jealous and protective, though she makes more of an effort to give Chuck space with Jill.

Sarah's feelings for Chuck and their ramifications for their mission are the focus of "Chuck Versus the Broken Heart", when Beckman decides Sarah and Chuck are too close emotionally, leading her to temporarily replace her with Agent Alexandra Forrest (the 49B). After the mission takes a turn for the worse, it becomes clear that the strong emotional bond between Chuck and Sarah is more of an asset than a liability, leading Beckman to reinstate Sarah's position.

At the end of "Chuck Versus the First Kill", Beckman orders Sarah to lure Chuck to Castle so he could be taken into custody and returned to Washington. Feeling guilt in the act of betraying him, Sarah instead warns Chuck of the plan and reveals that they thus have to flee. They nearly have sex in "Chuck Versus the Colonel", but a series of circumstances, including the arrival of John Casey, interrupts them.

Despite their apparently genuine connection at the close of "Chuck Versus the Colonel", Chuck now free from the intersect, Sarah wavers in "Chuck Versus the Ring" between leaving Chuck on her new assignment (the new Intersect project with Bryce Larkin) and staying with him. She ultimately chooses to stay with Chuck, which resolves that love triangle, but Chuck doesn't learn of her choice until Bryce tells him in the Intersect room. Despite this knowledge, and reflecting on her confidence in him as a hero, Chuck uploads the new Intersect. Josh Schwartz and Chris Fedak have suggested that Chuck re-uploading the Intersect will have implications for his developing relationship with Sarah. Josh Schwartz says that "in a way, she becomes his Kryptonite" as Chuck's emotional state will impact his ability to control his new Intersect.

By the beginning of "Chuck Versus the Pink Slip", Chuck's relationship with Sarah has been shattered. Flashbacks over the course of the episode reveal that Sarah asked him to go AWOL and run away with her to be together. Chuck was initially happy to do so, but by the time he met with her at their agreed rendezvous point had changed his mind and declined so he could go to Prague and become a real spy. Sarah was heartbroken and cut off contact with him. Their relationship was partially mended by the end of "Chuck Versus the Three Words" when Carina shows Sarah security footage of a failed attempt by Chuck to explain the situation: He had to turn her down because of the sense of duty and confidence Sarah instilled in him, and that he knew he needed to be a real spy to protect those he loves—Sarah included.

Chuck admitted directly to Sarah he wanted to be with her in "Chuck Versus the Final Exam" and asked her to run away with him in "Chuck Versus the American Hero". In "Chuck Versus the Other Guy", Sarah saw the lengths to which Chuck was willing to go when he misappropriated a government strike team in an attempt to rescue her when he believed Shaw intended to kill her. Chuck's misgivings over Shaw's stability after learning Sarah was the one who killed his wife proved well-founded when Shaw revealed he had been turned to the Ring, and he was forced to shoot Shaw when Sarah's life was in danger. Chuck and Sarah subsequently began a real relationship and had sex in a hotel room in Paris.

He and Sarah did attempt to run away from the spy life together in "Chuck Versus the Honeymooners", however a run-in with a surrendering Basque terrorist led them both to realize (with the advice of the terrorist) that they wanted to "have it all", being together without giving up their jobs. Although Beckman was not pleased when she learned of their relationship, even she noted "it's about damn time". In "Chuck Versus the Role Models", Chuck hints that he and Sarah could be together in 30 years.

In "Chuck Versus the Cubic Z", Chuck accidentally proposes to Sarah when he found Big Mike's engagement ring and held it out to her. In "Chuck Versus the Coup d'Etat" it is revealed that both walked away awkwardly but at the end of the episode, Sarah, taking the advice from a self-help book, reveals to Chuck while he is asleep in bed that nothing could ever change her love for him and that if Chuck really were to propose, she would say "yes". Chuck, seemingly sleeping, slowly grins.

In "Chuck Versus Phase Three", it is revealed that Chuck had been planning a proposal to Sarah. Before she goes on a rogue mission to find Chuck (after he was kidnapped in the previous episode), Sarah tells Casey "I'm different without Chuck, and I don't like it"; she proves this by kidnapping a Thai aide, and threatening his life by injecting him with ammonia. When she finds Chuck, he is unconscious and has nearly completed Phase Three-a lobotomy removing all portions of his brain not pertaining to the Intersect. She tells him that she would marry him if he were to propose.

Chuck attempted to propose in "Chuck Versus the Balcony" but is repeatedly disrupted. Sarah overhears him discuss the plan with Morgan and recruits Grimes to make sure the next attempt succeeds. However just as Chuck is about to pop the question Sarah is arrested as a setup for an undercover operation.

In "Chuck Versus the Push Mix" Chuck proposes to Sarah. By "Chuck Versus the Seduction Impossible", it is revealed that Sarah has said yes. Sarah asks Chuck to elope, but Chuck disagrees, wanting to have a big "family wedding." The two go so far as to attempt to seduce each other into agreeing, but Sarah relents and agrees to Chuck's version of the wedding.

Chuck and Sarah marry in "Chuck Versus the Cliffhanger".

In "Chuck Versus Sarah", Sarah has forgotten all about Chuck after having her mind wiped by the intersect in "Chuck Versus the Bullet Train". She was given false information about her past by Nicholas Quinn, and was under the impression that Chuck used the intersect for evil reasons. Chuck tries to convince her otherwise, however, she doesn't believe him, and nearly resorts to killing Chuck until she saw "Sarah + Chuck" engraved in the wall of their dream house. Casey later gives Sarah a disc of all of Sarah's video logs from when she was Chuck's handler. After watching the videos, Sarah tells Chuck that she believes his claims, but that she doesn't feel the love for him that he feels for her. At the end of the series in "Chuck Versus the Goodbye", Chuck tells Sarah about their story, and Sarah asks Chuck to kiss her, which he does, as the series ends.

=== The Intersect ===
Chuck becomes a CIA asset when his former nemesis "Bryce Larkin" (Matthew Bomer) sends him an email containing coded images. When he opens the email the Intersect 1.0 is downloaded onto his brain. Later Bryce Larkin gives Chuck intersect glasses (at the time Chuck believed they were sunglasses) that upgrade the intersect with new Intel that was discovered after he (Bryce) sent Chuck the email. Then on a mission against Fulcrum Chuck has a Fulcrum test intersect downloaded onto his brain. Later Bryce Larkin is chosen to receive the Intersect 2.0 but it is a trap. The bodyguards accompanying him into the Intersect room were double agents. When Sarah, Casey, and Chuck come to save him Bryce is shot. In no condition to obtain the Intersect Chuck does it instead (by command of Bryce) he downloads the Intersect then destroys the upload computer that previously stored the Intersect (also on Bryce's command). When the double agents eventually break into the room (with Sarah and Casey as hostages) Chuck discovers that the intersect contains a program that makes the agent an ultimate Kung Fu, gun firing, ninja star throwing, ETC master! After the brutal but short fight Chuck says, "I know Kung Fu" this later becomes an unofficial code word which means the person who says it has the Intersect in his brain.

=== Spy life ===
Chuck discovers he learned Kung Fu from the Intersect

In many episodes Chuck has adopted a fantasy alias, "Charles Carmichael", who is endowed with all the characteristics he believes a super-spy should have, except he doesn't really have the physical abilities to go with the skills. Carmichael has been referred to as where Chuck thought he would be by this time in his life had he not been expelled from Stanford: a millionaire semiretired software magnate. His fantasy alias has gained respect in the spy community: in "Chuck Versus the Predator", Fulcrum agent Vincent told Chuck he's heard of him, and the mercenary Mr. Colt was highly impressed with Chuck. His adventures as "Carmichael" are also beginning to make him a legend in the CIA community. His operational aliases are numerous; various false passports and identity documents are stored in a shoebox under his bed, as seen in the beginning of "Chuck Versus Tom Sawyer".

While police and operational backup personnel have supported Casey and Sarah in various episodes, Chuck is revealed near the climax of "Chuck Versus the Ex" to have gained the contact information required to summon such teams on his own initiative. Moments later, it is further revealed that Chuck carries a badge and credentials which give him some degree of authority over local and federal law enforcement agencies, including the police and FBI. This is demonstrated in the episode when, upon arriving at an emergency situation where an assassin released a biological weapon on a scientific conference, Chuck promptly assumed command of the operation without dispute from the senior officer on-site. In "Chuck Versus the Beard", Chuck reveals to Ring agents Del and Neil that he has "Level 6" security clearance, though how high this places him in the CIA security hierarchy has not been expanded on, though it is high enough for Carina to become interested in Chuck.

Chuck has been charting every piece of information he can find on Fulcrum unknown to his handlers, the Intersect and various figures connected to the CIA and NSA on a board hidden behind the Tron poster in his bedroom, and continues to express a desire to have the intel removed from his brain. Using the data, Chuck built a bot to search the web for Orion, which he can be seen using in the opening scenes of "Chuck Versus the Predator". He succeeds in doing what the CIA and NSA could not; he gets the attention of Orion who recognizes Chuck as the Intersect and thus wants to meet him. Orion reveals it is possible to remove the Intersect from Chuck's brain before his apparent suicide upon his capture by Fulcrum. It was later revealed in "Chuck Versus the Dream Job" that not only did Orion survive, but is actually Chuck's father.

In "Chuck Versus the Ring", after Bryce is killed, Chuck downloads the modified Intersect 2.0 before destroying the computer system. When confronted by agents belonging to the Ring who had been intent on taking control of the system, he uses the knowledge received from the Intersect to quickly disable them in hand-to-hand combat. Earlier in the episode, Ted Roark reveals that Fulcrum has specifically ordered that Chuck be killed regardless of whether they recover the Intersect.

Chuck was fired by Beckman after failing his spy training in "Chuck Versus the Pink Slip", but by the end of the episode proved his value and was reinstated on the team. He was sent on his first solo mission by Daniel Shaw in "Chuck Versus First Class". Throughout the third season Chuck continued to train with Sarah, Casey, and Shaw. In "Chuck Versus the Final Exam", Chuck completed his last tests (with Casey's help) and was activated as a full-fledged spy by Beckman and ordered to report to Washington, D.C. for induction. He quits being a spy but after finding his father's secret room it is uncertain whether he'll remain a civilian. In the premiere of season 4, it is revealed that after the success of Operation Bartowski, the President made Chuck a priority and is forced to become a spy again at the orders of Beckman.

It is revealed that Chuck comes from a long line of spies as his father told him through the electronic message.

In "Chuck Versus the Push Mix", Chuck captures Alexei Volkoff, a notable achievement in his record

In "Chuck Versus the Couch Lock" Beckman expresses a great deal of pride in Chuck's development as an operative, after Chuck outlines a complex plan to lure Casey's old team out of hiding by using Casey himself as the bait. However. the realization that he is putting his friend in danger for his own purposes unsettles him greatly, and he is prepared to call off his clandestine search for his mother entirely to protect them.

In "Chuck Versus the Last Details", Sarah is poisoned by Volkoff Industries' "Norseman" weapon, and in "Chuck Versus the Cliffhanger", Chuck goes rogue in order to acquire the antidote to save Sarah's life.

At the beginning of season 5, Chuck, Sarah, Casey, and Morgan, have started a freelance spy organization known as "Carmichael Industries" using the assets formerly owned by Alexei Volkoff as start-up money. Morgan is now the Human intersect, as he accidentally put on a pair of intersect glasses at the end of season 4, although it is removed in "Chuck Versus the Business Trip". However, Carmichael Industries struggles, as they are outshined by Verbanski Corporation, led by Gertrude Verbanski, and had all the money in their account frozen by Clyde Decker in "Chuck Versus the Zoom". Towards the middle and end of season 5, Chuck, Sarah, and Casey work alongside Verbanski and Beckman in some joint missions. At the end of the series in "Chuck Versus the Goodbye", Chuck is offered a position back in the CIA, but refuses.

=== Family life ===
Chuck had been attempting to locate his father for Ellie's wedding but had met with limited success, as Stephen Bartowski didn't want to be found. However, his search ends in "Chuck Versus the Broken Heart" when Sarah uses her access to the CIA databases at Langley to run her own unauthorized search. She successfully locates him in a trailer in a field 100 miles east of Barstow, CA and takes Chuck to see him. In "Chuck Versus the Dream Job", Stephen reveals his identity as Orion and said he had allowed Sarah to find him. Chuck went to work for Stephen's rival Ted Roark to help the CIA stop a major virus attack. After Stephen's capture by Roark, he convinced Beckman to assign them the mission to rescue him.

Due to his "exceptional field service", Chuck received his bachelor's degree in Engineering from Stanford, a degree he was only 12 credits short of earning when he was expelled. Sarah and Casey both played a significant role in this development. In "Chuck Versus the Dream Job", we learn that Stephen (his father) is really Orion, the Intersect's creator. Although Stephen J. Bartowski would appear in "Chuck Versus the Dream Job", no real information about their mother has been given, except that she left them at a young age and her name is Mary Elizabeth. Chuck and Ellie celebrate "Mother's Day" each year with dinner to celebrate the day they both learned to take care of each other.

In the Season Two finale, Chuck quits the Buy More as a wedding present to Ellie, who has been encouraging him to live up to his potential. By the beginning of the third season, Chuck is still living with Ellie and Devon. At the end of the premier, they move out leaving Chuck with the apartment to himself until Morgan agrees to move in (to Ellie's disappointment). Chuck returns to his old position at the Buy More for his cover.

Chuck was ultimately unable to protect his sister from his spy life. By the end of Season Three, the Ring took advantage of Ellie to lure their father out of hiding in an attempt to capture the Governor for Shaw. She was further manipulated by Justin Sullivan and was in his "protective custody" when Chuck, Sarah, and Casey unwittingly trailed Shaw to a CIA facility as part of Shaw's plan to discredit Operation Bartowski. Chuck accidentally revealed his spy connections when he punched out Justin in front of Ellie. The events also lead to the death of Stephen, who Shaw murdered for the sole purpose of compromising Chuck's emotions, rendering the Intersect unusable. After being captured by Shaw and then rescued by Ellie, Devon, and Morgan, Chuck agreed to quit the CIA for Ellie's sake once the Ring was defeated.

However, Chuck was forced to begin lying to Ellie again at the beginning of Season 4 after being coerced back into the Agency by General Beckman when his rogue search for his mother coincided with Casey and Sarah's own missions to bring down Volkoff Industries. Chuck did eventually admit to Ellie that he was searching for Mary but kept his return to government work a secret. In "Chuck Versus the Couch Lock" Chuck spoke to his mother for the first time—presumably, since she left the family some twenty years earlier—when she contacted him at the conclusion of his operation to extract information on her whereabouts from Casey's old special forces team. Chuck was stunned and disheartened when what he had learned suggested Mary may have been working for Volkoff all along.

Ellie announced to Chuck that she was pregnant at the beginning of season 4, which was a contributing factor to him not telling her of the search for their mother. Ellie's pregnancy progresses as the season goes on, and in the Season 4 mid-season finale, Chuck's niece, Clara, is born.

== Character development ==
Zachary Levi was the first actor cast for the series and was announced as starring in the title role on February 7, 2007. On January 16, 2009, it was announced that Scott Bakula would appear as Chuck and Ellie's father in a three-episode story alongside Chevy Chase.

Interviews with Chris Fedak and Josh Schwartz have likened Chuck's development in the first two seasons to an origin story, describing Chuck as Luke Skywalker and born into his role as opposed to Peter Parker who stumbled into it. Season two especially has focused on Chuck's evolution from a regular guy to show that he has the potential to be a true hero.

Zachary Levi has indicated that by the beginning of Season Three, two characters will have discovered Chuck's secret life. In "Chuck Versus the Colonel", Chuck reveals his work as a spy to Captain Awesome, but implores him to keep it secret.

Zachary Levi has suggested that the new skills Chuck learns from Intersect 2.0 will fade again after use.

Josh Schwartz and Chris Fedak have confirmed that Intersect 2.0 will introduce a number of complications in Chuck's development as a spy. The most significant is that Chuck's emotional state will have a direct impact on the functionality of his abilities, as the modifications his father made at the government's request were designed for Bryce Larkin, a trained agent capable of controlling his feelings. Schwartz and Fedak have indicated Chuck's emotional state could lead to an unpredictable and potentially dangerous response from the Intersect to those around him, and that a substantial part of the third season will center on Chuck learning to control and focus his emotional state and with it his control of the Intersect.

Actor Joshua Rush was added to the recurring cast to play young Chuck in flashbacks. He first appeared in the role in "Chuck Versus the Ring: Part II", and returned in the Season 4 premiere, "Chuck Versus the Anniversary".

=== Personality ===
==== In relation to spy life ====
Chuck's personality stands in contrast to the role into which he is thrust, a conflict which drives the series from several angles. Chuck is portrayed as a sincerely well-meaning underachiever, so when he is caught up in a larger struggle, he has to draw on his potential and become something new to meet the threat, while trying to maintain his good nature.

Chuck, who has an aversion to violence and a low tolerance for pain, unwittingly enters a world of people willing to do violence to him. He is caring and sensitive, and those around him are often placed in danger. He is a trusting individual suddenly surrounded by people who constantly deceive him as a matter of course, to include his allies, one of whom is also his love interest; adversaries and allies alike take advantage of his naivete and generally friendly nature. He is trustworthy, dependable and supportive of those he cares about, and he is forced to lie to, disappoint and even shame them in order to protect them.

He has a deep sense of personal responsibility and honor, but these can put him in even greater danger; however, this sense and his determination to do the right thing has the habit of inspiring those around him to act against their nature and do the right thing themselves. Carina Miller, who is a selfish agent, was moved enough by Chuck's refusal to leave Sarah to fend for herself that she agreed to help when her instinct was to take off and abandon Sarah. The same can be said for Roan Montgomery (admits cowardice), Craig and Laura Turner (turned traitor), and Stephen Bartowski (default reaction is to run).

He is portrayed as a romantic in a situation in which he can't have a real relationship: all potential girlfriends may have ulterior motives, his main love interest must maintain professional distance (in part to keep them safe), and people in the spy business are often used/manipulated.

Most of all, he has a desire to live a normal life, when circumstances (including his natural abilities) constantly put him in a position of unique responsibility to do the extraordinary.

To rise to the occasion, Chuck must rely on what strengths he has.

His affable and wholesome nature makes those around him protective of him. At Stanford, Bryce protects Chuck from a life that he thinks will destroy Chuck, though this does cause Chuck some pain. Sarah immediately gets the impression that Chuck is a good guy after they meet, which leads her to protect him rather than suspect him of being a villain, and breaks protocol repeatedly (even risking her career and freedom) to help Chuck. Casey has trouble bringing himself to kill Chuck, even on orders. Jill, a Fulcrum agent, has trouble betraying Chuck, and risks being recaptured to go back and tell Chuck where his father is being taken. Even Shaw, following being turned into a Ring Agent, protected Chuck's identity as the Intersect from the Ring.

Among his problem-solving skills, Chuck is proficient in the use, identification, repair, and manipulation of a variety of electronics due to his experience in the Nerd Herd. These skills have come in handy many times, and his job as a member of the Nerd Herd has given him a good cover on missions. His job at the Buy More has, however, been a double-edged sword; he has been called away from the Buy More or away from his handlers by enemy agents (or, in Carina's case, agents who are not trusted) on a false 'computer emergency.'

At base, Chuck has inherited and developed a powerful intellect and has an impressive ability to solve puzzles. In "Chuck Versus the Alma Mater", Professor Fleming touts Chuck's ability to retain subliminal information, saying that his essay responses correlated to 98% of the exam, making him one of the top candidates for a CIA military project (and the ideal recipient of the Intersect).

His well-developed geek interests, from music to video games to learning the Klingon language, have managed to come in handy on several missions. He has used a Tron movie poster and a comic book to hide his personal research from his handlers.

And last, although he tends to be visibly frightened in situations involving guns and danger, he has a deep reserve of courage, and almost always summons the nerve to risk his own life during a mission if he deems it necessary (such as if Sarah Walker's life is at risk). Even the fear itself comes in handy: Chuck takes advantage of his keen fear of needles by inciting a torturer to threaten him with a needle so that he faints.

In "Chuck Versus First Class", Shaw expresses the opinion that in some ways Casey and Sarah have held Chuck back in his development as a spy, due to his reliance on them to help him in difficult or dangerous situations. Both objected to Shaw sending Chuck out alone on a mission. Chuck was eager for an opportunity to get out from under his teammates' control and not have to "stay in the car".

"Chuck Versus the Nacho Sampler" demonstrates the degree to which Chuck's personality has changed over the course of the series. Devon notes the ease with which Chuck is now able to lie to his sister, and he "burned" his first asset by using the relationship and turning him over to the same protective custody he himself was once faced with. At the end of the episode, Chuck began drinking to cope with his actions. This change was further highlighted in "Chuck Versus the Fake Name", where he is increasingly disturbed by what he is becoming and telling Ellie he doesn't know who he is anymore.

In "Chuck Versus the Honeymooners", Morgan reveals that Chuck suffers from eczema (which Chuck admitted to having earlier in the series) and is an avid fan of DC Comics. In "Chuck Versus Tom Sawyer", it is revealed that Chuck is allergic to cats and Chuck admits to being allergic to all members of the polecat family (Whether this is true or said to avoid spending time at Jeff's residence is unknown).

==== In relation to non-spy life ====
Aside from its implications for his spy life, Chuck's personality is notable for the close relationships he develops with his family and best friend, its impact on his romantic life, and the position of leadership it earns him at the Buy More.

Chuck's loyalty and dependability to his best friend and his family have given him people he can always fall back on throughout the series, despite the strains introduced by his spy life as mentioned above. Casey is impressed by Chuck's loyalty to Morgan.

Chuck's good nature, humor, emotional supportiveness and obvious desire for a normal life have helped endear him to Sarah, who ultimately prefers Chuck to both Cole Barker and Bryce Larkin, both of whom are braver and better in combat than Chuck. Their relationship continues to develop despite constant setbacks. Chuck's personality is also a big factor in Lou's attraction to him.

Although he does not hold a management position at the Buy More, both the sales associates and Nerd Herd staff look to him for guidance and leadership. Co-worker Anna Wu (Julia Ling) explained to a corporate efficiency expert that the store's chain of command is "There's Chuck, then there's the rest of us. Oh, and then there's Jeff", and Lester Patel (Vik Sahay) reports that when unsure in a situation, asks himself, "WWCD, what would Chuck do?" When asked "Who personifies the Buy More ideal? Who makes the trains run on time? Who provides your moral compass? Who holds the team together?" the staff unanimously answers "Chuck". Even Big Mike holds Chuck in high regard, and has frequently turned to Chuck when he has things that need to be done and done right, and would have preferred him as Assistant Manager over Harry Tang. When Ned asks who is in charge at the Buy More, after he took the people their hostage, everyone, including Emmett and Big Mike, answer "Chuck". When Big Mike's new girlfriend revealed her son worked at the Buy More, Big Mike openly hoped that it was Chuck.

=== Evolution ===
Wrist computer given to Chuck by his father (Orion)

==== Self-perception and initiative ====
Chuck became the Intersect unwittingly, and was essentially forced into a life in which he has no privacy and greatly reduced personal freedom, in which his relationships with his friends and family are strained, and in which he and those around him are in constant danger. He did not initially respond positively to this, but cooperated one mission at a time, all the while insisting he was not a hero. His perception of himself as less than heroic despite repeatedly saving the day seems to be based on his aversion to violence, low tolerance for pain, and lack of skill in combat.

For these reasons and because several missions have dragged him through old personal anxieties, he was initially reluctant to participate in missions. By the middle of the second season, though, he began to look forward to missions and has even been disappointed when his handlers didn't have a new assignment for him.

However, this was contingent upon the fact that he still had the Intersect in his head. Chuck frequently expressed a desire to return to a "normal" life, based partly on his understanding that having the Intersect in his head is a barrier to a real relationship with Sarah. He was determined to remove the Intersect from his head once he began to believe it was a possibility, and pursued that possibility even at risk to himself. Once the Intersect was removed, Chuck turned down an offer to become an analyst on the new Intersect project.

In "Chuck Versus the Ring", Chuck decides to help Sarah rescue Casey (who fortunately did not need to be rescued) and Bryce and prevents the Intersect from falling into the wrong hands and explains to his father that he is doing so because he loves Sarah. He strongly insists on joining the mission to the Intersect room and argues that he is uniquely qualified to help. When he finds Bryce dying and is suddenly faced with the choice of downloading the Intersect again or just destroying it, he reflects on the confidence that others have in him (that he is both good and capable) and his sense of duty to protect those close to him. He downloads the Intersect, marking a shift from being a reluctant asset to being a willing agent.

In the aftermath, Chuck shows an unusual enthusiasm for becoming a different person as he gets the chance to train to be a spy. He soon turns down an offer from Sarah to run away together, choosing instead to go through with the training. Later, he explains that he made that choice because he has a unique ability to help a lot of people, including his friends, his family, and Sarah, and because he had learned from her to act for the greater good despite his personal feelings.

Chuck begins to challenge himself to prove he is a real spy. In "Chuck Versus First Class", when Agent Shaw concludes that Chuck's handlers have been holding back his development as a spy, Chuck agrees, and welcomes the news that Shaw is assigning him to a solo mission. And though he is clearly conflicted, he "burns" an asset, relegating that person to a life in an isolated facility instead of letting him escape; Chuck explains his decision by telling the asset, "I'm not [your friend]; I'm a spy".

==== Attitude toward violence ====
For most of the series, Chuck has been strongly pacifistic. He specifically told Sarah he dislikes guns and showed a preference of avoiding or preventing conflict. He was deeply disturbed by Sarah's execution of Fulcrum agent Mauser.

However, when options necessitate the use of violence, Chuck is able to use means that could injure or kill. Later, during the events of "Chuck Versus the Suburbs", Fulcrum was attempting to refine their own version of the Intersect. The device was flawed, and except for Chuck, those subjected to the test were killed or driven insane. When Chuck saw Casey sneak up to the controls, although fully aware of what would happen to the Fulcrum agents who were in the test room, Chuck signaled Casey to activate the Intersect in order to prevent them from testing on Sarah. This incident was the first time that Chuck has willingly and personally taken a course of action where he knew that someone was going to be hurt or even killed as a result. In "Chuck Versus the Colonel", Chuck used a Dodge Challenger to deliberately run down a crowd of Fulcrum operatives who were holding Sarah prisoner.

Chuck handled a gun for the first time on an actual mission in "Chuck Versus the Lethal Weapon;" it did not go well as Chuck accidentally stumbles and drops the gun, shooting Perseus in the leg. Despite his aversion to firearms established in this episode and earlier in "Chuck Versus the Marlin", Chuck points a gun at Casey so that he can get away to go on a rogue mission; Casey informs him that it is only a tranquilizer gun, and Chuck puts three darts into Casey. Chuck later asked Sarah if he gets to have a gun for their rescue of his father in "Chuck Versus the Colonel".

At the beginning of Season 3 he is willing to personally harm others in combat (and take some pride in his ability to do so), though he still prefers to keep violence to a minimum and a preference to abstain from killing, or at the very least, being directly responsible for someone's death. Despite a long series of female adversaries, in "Chuck Versus the Honeymooners", Chuck still can't bring himself to hit a woman. In "Chuck Versus First Class", Chuck specifically reaffirmed his aversion to killing when packing for his first solo mission, having chosen nunchaku as a backup weapon in the event he needed to defend himself. Chuck was later ordered to kill a rogue CIA agent selling secrets to the Ring. Although he attempted to carry out the assignment he hesitated at the last moment and was only saved when the target attempted to draw his own weapon when Casey intervened and gunned him down first. Chuck was ultimately unable to avoid resorting to deadly force, and when Shaw attempted to kill Sarah, Chuck was forced to shoot him first. Shaw survived the shot, and Chuck, given a second chance decided on arrest rather than vengeance; while Shaw said it made him weak, Sarah said it is what makes him great.

In Season Four, Chuck has still, to date, not been directly responsible for killing another person, and has been more successful finding a non-violent method to prevent catastrophe. He's prevented civil war and a nuclear strike by surrendering and acting as a mediator and marriage counselor between Generallisimo Goya and his wife, Hortencia. He also prevents his mother from using a gun to dispatch Volkoff's guards, tranqs them himself and informs Mary that he's going to have a talk about the benefits of tranq guns. When Alexei Volkoff tries to use Chuck's gun on him, Chuck informs him that he was never going to kill Alexei, a fact that was proven when Alexei pulls the trigger and Chuck reveals that he "has this thing about bullets."

Ironically, despite his dislike of guns and aversion to using lethal force, several episodes have suggested that Chuck is an excellent shot even without the aid of the Intersect. In particular, in "Chuck Versus the Nacho Sampler" he was able to pick up and accurately fire a tranq gun at Manoosh from a substantial distance with almost no time spent aiming and no observable flash. In "Chuck Versus the American Hero," he tranqs a Ring agent from approximately the same distance and comments "No flash necessary." Chuck's frequent explanation to his marksmanship has been Nintendo's Duck Hunt video game; however, upon learning of the Intersect, Morgan accuses Chuck of cheating when Chuck completes the round with a perfect score, stating 'You flashed on Duck Hunt.'

In the series finale, Chuck showed clear confusion when handling Casey's Desert Eagle without the Intersect and hesitated to kill Quinn even when he had a clear shot. Instead, Chuck decided to fire a warning shot and inadvertently shot down Casey's helicopter much to Chuck's shock and Casey's anger and frustration.

==== Competence ====
Josh Schwartz has stated that Chuck will continue to evolve and gain confidence in his new role. Although inexperienced, Chuck's natural intelligence and observational skills have steadily been making him a more effective agent. Sarah has frequently encouraged him in this regard, and even Casey has made observations on Chuck's abilities. After Chuck removed the Intersect from his head, General Beckman invited Chuck to become an analyst, telling him he "showed real promise".

Chuck has become more proficient through the development of the Intersect, as well. Stephen Bartowski teaches Chuck how to perform a superhuman feat of computation using the Intersect in "Chuck Versus the Dream Job". In "Chuck Versus the First Kill", Chuck is able to flash on multiple subjects at the same time. And the enhanced Intersect 2.0 grants Chuck physical abilities: his first flash teaches him kung fu, marking the first time Chuck has excelled in any kind of combat.

In the third season, Chuck has already shown that he is beginning to overcome some of his fears. Despite his previous fear of heights, he has now arrived at home wearing a harness from being dropped off by a helicopter, and he has used a zip-line. He is also noticeably less squeamish around blood in "Chuck Versus the Angel de la Muerte" than he was in previous seasons. In Chuck versus the Tooth, while he is still phobic of needles, Chuck no longer faints.

By Season 4 Chuck has proven himself to be a fully capable agent, even without the aid of the Intersect (although he still uses flashes for assistance in combat, and for other skills Sarah and Casey have picked up over years of training). His success as an agent ultimately leads to the President making Chuck's reinstatement a priority and Beckman forcing Chuck back into CIA service. In "Chuck Versus the Suitcase", Chuck shows Q-like capability when he develops his tranq gloves. In "Chuck Versus the Coup d'Etat", Ellie remarks that she had never seen Chuck look as alive as he did when drawing on the Intersect to help her, Devon, Sarah, and Generalissimo Goya escape a coup in Costa Gravas. Chuck also planned an elaborate trap to lure Casey's old team out of hiding in "Chuck Versus the Couch Lock" as part of his attempts to locate his mother, although it is left unclear how much of the plan was influenced by Casey and Sarah (though, as the original thought was Chuck's, it's very likely that Sarah's and Casey's involvements were minor.) In "Chuck versus Phase Three", General Beckman assures the team that Chuck, even without the Intersect, has a place as a spy.

Chuck's remarkable ability and natural aptitude with the Intersect has caused many members of the military and spy community to resent him; the most notable to date has been Director Jane Bentley, who briefly became the project leader and used Chuck's laptop to create Intersect agents in "Chuck Versus the A-Team". After a major debacle caused by one of Bentley's "trigger-happy" agents, Bentley was removed as project leader, and Beckman charged Chuck with the task of finding his replacement, essentially promoting him to project leader. Season five introduced Nicholas Quinn, who reveals to have been the original agent chosen for the Intersect project before the computer was destroyed by Bryce Larkin. Quinn, having been relegated by the CIA after this, makes it his personal mission to acquire the Intersect he had been promised and kill Chuck for "stealing" the career he was supposed to have.

By the fifth season, Chuck no longer works for the CIA, but remains in the spy life by launching a freelance espionage and security company, Carmichael Industries. Though he is without the Intersect, his aptitude, intelligence and technological abilities allow him to lead the former members of Operation Bartowski as a mastermind. It is revealed that he was known as the "Piranha" and the movie "The Swordfish" was made about his legendary hacking skills. He uses a fine Chardonnay, his "thinking juice," to pull off his "The Routine" of his l33t skillz which he uses to find and track down "Colin David of MIT." He gets really giddy when he's in "The Routine." Though he has been retired for a while, Chuck still bests a terrorist's lead hacker in a "hack-off," where he circumvents the cell's security, steals the Omen virus, and orders bigscreen TVs for the organization while his opponent steals one cent from the National Treasury (with Chuck's help.) He also shows respectable hand-to-hand combat abilities without the intersect, going toe-to-toe with the likes of Daniel Shaw (without the intersect) and Nicholas Quinn, as well as being able to dispatch random henchman and even block a series of attacks from an Intersect-enhanced Morgan.

==== Personal, professional, romantic ====
Chuck has developed in other ways since the series started. At the beginning, he is socially awkward to the point of driving away women, in large part because he is unable to get over his betrayals at Stanford. He is stuck in a bad job, unsure if he even wants to advance within the company, and lacks confidence that he can do better.

Since then, he has developed romantically with Sarah despite constant setbacks, he has (with the help of the government) attained his degree from Stanford and is able to successfully get a job at a top technology company (although for a mission), and is determined to take control of his life.

In the third season, Chuck has embraced his destiny to become a spy, and turns down Sarah's offer to run away together, though he still loves her. He also more than once expresses an interest in getting a better cover job.

At the end of "Chuck Versus the Other Guy", Chuck and Sarah become a couple. He has also proposed that they would be together in 30 years. In Chuck Versus the Suitcase while conversing with Sarah, Chuck has hinted that they were "next" after Devon and Ellie to get married and have children. This initially horrified Sarah, but she has since confirmed that she would marry him if he proposed. In "Chuck Versus Phase Three" it has been revealed to everybody that Chuck has an extravagant proposal plan, which he has since revised. In "Chuck Versus the Push Mix" Chuck proposes to Sarah, and she accepts. By "Chuck Versus the Seduction Impossible", the couple are already planning their wedding. And on Chuck Versus the Cliffhanger, the couple married and bought the Buy More, from all of the Volkoff Industries' assets, courtesy of Hartley Winterbottom; AKA the former Alexei Volkoff.

By the end of the series, Chuck was shown to be in much greater control of his emotions, having developed enough emotional maturity and control to allow him to use the Intersect on cue even during the events of the final episode, during which his emotions were clearly and greatly compromised.

== Reception ==
UGO.com named him one of the best TV nerds.
