= Chuck Versus the Nemesis =

- Chuck episode
- Bryce holds Chuck hostage.
- Episode no.: Season 1 Episode 10
- Directed by: Allison Liddy
- Written by: Chris Fedak
- Production code: 3T6459
- Original air date: November 26, 2007

Guest appearances
- Matthew Bomer as Bryce Larkin; Ryan McPartlin as Devon Woodcomb; Anthony Ruivivar as Tommy Delgado; Scott Krinsky as Jeff Barnes; Vik Sahay as Lester Patel; Mark Christopher Lawrence as "Big Mike" Tucker; Julia Ling as Anna Wu

Episode chronology
← Previous "Chuck Versus the Imported Hard Salami"	Next → "Chuck Versus the Crown Vic"

"Chuck Versus the Nemesis" is the tenth episode of Chuck's first season. It aired on NBC on November 26, 2007. Chuck is forced to confront his former college roommate and the man who ruined his life when Bryce Larkin is discovered alive.

== Plot summary ==
=== Main plot ===
Bryce Larkin (Matthew Bomer) is undergoing examination in a CIA detention facility while Casey and Sarah look on. However, he refuses to speak with anyone but Chuck. Chuck is at work, still trying to get in touch with Sarah since their kiss in the previous episode. Sarah arrives to bring him in before they can discuss what happened between them.

Chuck is shocked to learn Bryce is alive and wants to see him. Casey lets Chuck into the room where he's being held, but Bryce doesn't believe it's him until after a short exchange in Klingon. Before Chuck can get any answers, Bryce takes him hostage and uses him to escape into an elevator. Bryce releases him and begins to explain when the elevator stops and he is confronted by Tommy (Anthony Ruivivar). Chuck flashes and identifies him as a member of Fulcrum. Tommy tells Bryce to give himself up, but Bryce refuses. The elevator starts moving again and Chuck questions him about Fulcrum, but Bryce is evasive. He admits his surprise how quickly the Intersect works but as the elevator stops again, Bryce tranquillizes Chuck and leaves him as he makes his escape.

Later Sarah is helping Chuck home and tells him that Bryce is not their concern. Ellie comes out to ask if Sarah is joining them for Thanksgiving dinner and Sarah agrees. The next night Sarah meets Chuck at his home. Ellie has also invited Casey, and Morgan brings Anna. Chuck has to go to his car to get the marshmallows for Morgan's favorite dish and is approached by Bryce, who requests to talk to Sarah without Casey interfering. Chuck agrees and lets Bryce hide in his room before returning to dinner, where he tips off Sarah. Bryce starts explaining the situation and that she should believe him because she's still in love with him, then kisses her. Unknown to both, Chuck sees the two kissing and tips off Casey that Bryce is there. Bryce leaves before Casey arrives and Thanksgiving dinner breaks up, with Casey, Sarah and Chuck pursuing Bryce.

Casey has Chuck and Sarah look in his apartment while he checks the back, where Chuck admits to having seen Bryce kiss her. They're unable to discuss the issue further before realizing someone is inside Casey's apartment. They enter to find Bryce attempting to break into the computer. Bryce tells them he's not rogue and that he was recruited by Fulcrum for an operation called "Sandwall," which causes Chuck to flash, confirming his story. He tells them Fulcrum is a rogue faction within the CIA, and he stole, destroyed, and sent the Intersect to Chuck to keep it out of their hands. Casey returns home, and before anyone can stop him, shoots Bryce.

Sarah checks up on Bryce and finds he was wearing a bulletproof vest. They manage to convince Casey that Bryce is telling the truth, and develop a plan to turn Bryce over to the CIA, using the Buy More Black Friday sale and the Intersect to ensure the contacts are not Fulcrum. Everyone arrives at the store and the hand-off goes as planned. Sarah accompanies Bryce to the transfer point, but they are ambushed on the way. They manage to escape their captors and head back to find Chuck. Meanwhile, Tommy shows up at the Buy More having deduced that Chuck is actually the Intersect. Chuck uses a pre-arranged "panic" word ("Pineapple") to trigger an evacuation of the store, distracting Tommy long enough for Casey to get him to the safety of the Home Theater room.

A shootout between Casey and Tommy's team erupts after the store evacuates, destroying the store. Bryce and Sarah arrive and engage the Fulcrum team in hand-to-hand combat while Casey attempts a breakout with Chuck but is knocked out by Tommy, who takes Chuck captive. Bryce asks Chuck a question in Klingon, and after he responds, Bryce shoots Chuck. Casey then arrives and knocks out Tommy. Sarah discovers Chuck is wearing a bulletproof vest and is alive. Bryce is assigned to go after Fulcrum and offers Sarah a chance to go with him. The episode ends with both Bryce and Chuck calling her, and Sarah unsure of which call to answer.

=== Buy More ===
Morgan is placed in charge of prepping the store for the Black Friday sale by Big Mike. The Nerd Herd team spends Thanksgiving morning going over crowd control. Morgan teaches them to use the word "pineapple" as a code to trigger an evacuation of the store, which the team begins mocking.

Morgan brings his new girlfriend, Anna, to Thanksgiving dinner where Anna immediately takes a dislike to Ellie, as Morgan's crush on her is well known. When Morgan begins going into ecstasies over his favorite dish, which Ellie makes as a specialty, Anna gets upset and leaves.

The next morning at the store, Chuck uses the "pineapple" code to trigger an evacuation when he's captured by Tommy. Big Mike panics at seeing the customers leave but is unable to stop them and is swept out of the store. Anna is knocked down by the press of people, and Morgan carries her out, passing her "test". Big Mike is about to fire Morgan when a fireman (part of an NSA cleanup team) tells him there was a gas leak, and Morgan saved everyone's life.

== Production ==
"Chuck Versus the Nemesis" answered several questions left by the pilot episode, specifically why Bryce stole the Intersect and sent it to Chuck in the first place. The episode is the beginning of the Fulcrum arc which became the primary focus of Season 2.

Tommy was the show's first antagonist to appear in more than one episode, having first appeared in "Chuck Versus the Imported Hard Salami". This is also the first time Fulcrum was mentioned or described. It also fleshes out more of Bryce's background. While Sarah has referred to her partnership with Bryce in past episodes, it is also the first time that audiences were shown how well they work together, illustrated by the fight scene in the Buy More when they work together to take out Tommy's men. It also marks the first time Bryce was used as a plot device to stagger the development of Chuck and Sarah's personal relationship.

=== Flashes ===
- Chuck flashes the first time he sees Tommy. This is the first time he learns about Fulcrum.
- When Bryce says the name of Fulcrum's operation to steal the Intersect, Chuck has a flash.

== Reception ==
IGN.com gave the episode a 9/10, feeling the episode made good use of the Black Friday subplot, and integrating the main and Buy More storylines. The comedy of the Thanksgiving dinner scene, and Anna's automatic dislike of Ellie was also greatly appreciated. The action in the second half was also well-done.

TVSquad enjoyed the turn from the self-contained stories leading up to "Chuck Versus the Nemesis" to the beginning of the overall arc. As with IGN, TVSquad touted the use of Black Friday.

== References to popular culture ==
- Bryce's line to Sarah, "We'll always have Omaha" is a nod to Casablanca's famed goodbye line "We'll always have Paris".
