= Chuck season 1 =

Chuck
- Season 1
- Season 1 DVD box set
- No. of episodes: 13

Release
- Original network: NBC
- Original release: September 24, 2007 – January 24, 2008

Season chronology
- Next → Season 2

The first season of Chuck originally aired between September 24, 2007, and January 24, 2008. The season, cut short by the Writers' Strike, contains thirteen episodes. It introduced the series' main characters and established the general plot of the title character, Chuck Bartowski, having to adapt to his new life as a spy after the only remaining copy of the U.S. government's spy secrets are embedded into his brain. He is forced to juggle his responsibilities as a spy and the supervisor of a technical support team, called the "Nerd Herd", at his local Buy More store (a parody of Best Buy). Having become the most important asset of the U.S. government, Chuck is under the constant surveillance of his CIA handler, Sarah Walker, and NSA agent John Casey, who remind him that he cannot reveal his spy life to his sister Ellie, nor his best friend Morgan Grimes.

== Cast and characters ==
=== Main cast ===
- Zachary Levi as Charles "Chuck" Bartowski (13 episodes)
- Yvonne Strahovski as Agent Sarah Walker (13 episodes)
- Joshua Gomez as Morgan Grimes (13 episodes)
- Sarah Lancaster as Dr. Eleanor "Ellie" Bartowski (11 episodes)
- Adam Baldwin as Major John Casey (13 episodes)

=== Supporting cast ===
- Scott Krinsky as Jeffrey "Jeff" Barnes (13 episodes)
- Vik Sahay as Lester Patel (13 episodes)
- Bonita Friedericy as Brigadier General Diane Beckman (11 episodes)
- Ryan McPartlin as Dr. Devon "Captain Awesome" Woodcomb (10 episodes)
- Mark Christopher Lawrence as "Big Mike" Tucker (9 episodes)
- Julia Ling as Anna Wu (9 episodes)
- Tony Todd as CIA Director Langston Graham (8 episodes)
- C. S. Lee as Harry Tang (6 episodes)
- Matthew Bomer as Bryce Larkin (4 episodes)
- Rachel Bilson as Lou Palone (2 episodes)
- Anthony Ruivivar as Tommy Delgado (2 episodes)
- Mini Andén as Carina Miller (1 episode)

== Episodes ==
No. overall	No. in season	Title	Directed by	Written by	Original release date	Prod. code	US viewers (millions)
1	1	"Chuck Versus the Intersect"	McG	Josh Schwartz & Chris Fedak	September 24, 2007	276025	9.21
Chuck receives an email from Bryce Larkin (Matthew Bomer), an old roommate and friend who is now a rogue government agent. The email contains all the government secrets once contained within a computer called the Intersect, which are then downloaded into his brain. Upon discovering that the data on the Intersect had been sent to Chuck, the CIA and the NSA send their agents Sarah Walker and John Casey to retrieve the data.
2	2	"Chuck Versus the Helicopter"	Robert Duncan McNeill	Josh Schwartz & Chris Fedak	October 1, 2007	3T6451	8.39
When a doctor who is brought in to recover the data from Chuck's mind is killed, Casey and Sarah turn against each other. Chuck eventually believes Sarah to be the killer, which causes a tense situation when the two of them attend a dinner hosted by his sister. It turns out that the doctor faked his death and kidnaps Sarah in order to force her to tell him where Chuck is because he wants to sell the secrets. While trying to rescue her, Chuck is captured. After a struggle inside a helicopter, Chuck finds himself forced to pilot the vehicle to safety.
3	3	"Chuck Versus the Tango"	Jason Ensler	Matthew Miller	October 8, 2007	3T6452	7.21
Through the use of the Intersect now stored in his brain, Chuck discovers that an arms dealer known only as "La Ciudad," whose appearance is unknown, will be present at an art auction. Chuck is forced to infiltrate the party with Sarah to try and identify La Ciudad. While Casey and Sarah are preoccupied by MI6 agents, Chuck ends up dancing the tango with a seductive Latin woman, Malena (Lorena Bernal), who turns out to be La Ciudad.
4	4	"Chuck Versus the Wookiee"	Allan Kroeker	Allison Adler	October 15, 2007	3T6454	8.36
When a diamond hidden in Malibu, owned by a hairy man whom Chuck calls "señor wookiee" (Iqbal Theba), is used to fund terrorists, Chuck has to help steal it back. Complicating things further is the appearance of Carina (Mini Anden), a DEA agent friend of Sarah's, who tries to help in her own way.
5	5	"Chuck Versus the Sizzling Shrimp"	David Solomon	Scott Rosenbaum	October 22, 2007	3T6453	7.22
When Chuck sabotages the mission of a Chinese spy, Mei-Ling Cho, (Gwendoline Yeo) who is trying to save her kidnapped brother, Sarah and Casey refuse to help him fix his mistake. However, the spy forces Chuck to help her get him back, on the condition that she defects from her spy organization. Meanwhile, Morgan is caught in a dilemma of his own when Buy More forces him into a sales competition that reveals his total failure as a salesman, only later to find out it was a ploy to make the sales team generally work harder. Chuck is frustrated that he cannot tell his sister the truth about his spy life. Note: The title refers to the main course of the dinner that Morgan was going to treat Sarah and Chuck to during their "Evening of Morgan."
6	6	"Chuck Versus the Sandworm"	Robert Duncan McNeill	Phil Klemmer	October 29, 2007	3T6455	7.65
Chuck accidentally runs into a runaway government agent named Laszlo (Jonathan Sadowski) who turns out to be a gadget whiz and whose brain makes him a national security asset and a dangerous liability, much like Chuck. Chuck decides to help him escape his handlers but reconsiders when he discovers that Laszlo wants to exact his revenge on the government. Chuck helps Sarah and Casey to track down Laszlo but misses his interview for the assistant manager position in the process. Meanwhile, Morgan feels that Chuck is neglecting their childhood and friendship. They reconcile and wear a two-man Sandworm costume (based on the creature from the Dune novels) to the Halloween party.
7	7	"Chuck Versus the Alma Mater"	Patrick Norris	Anne Cofell Saunders	November 5, 2007	3T6456	7.65
Chuck has to return to Stanford University, his Alma Mater from which he was unceremoniously expelled, on homecoming weekend to help a former professor, who, as Chuck finds out, is also a government operative being hunted for a sensitive top-secret file. Chuck must use his past experiences to find the Professor's hidden secret, while also discovering shocking secrets about his own life. More importantly, Chuck discovers the truth about his former friend Bryce Larkin and why Bryce had Chuck kicked out of Stanford. Meanwhile, Morgan has problems with the new assistant manager at Buy More.
8	8	"Chuck Versus the Truth"	Robert Duncan McNeill	Allison Adler	November 12, 2007	3T6457	7.56
Chuck battles with his cover love life and real love life when he meets a girl named Lou (Rachel Bilson), who seems interested in the real Chuck. On the other hand, his relationship with Sarah heats up as they go on a double date with Ellie and Devon and try to explain their sex life. Meanwhile, a poison specialist (Kevin Weisman) is trying to obtain codes to nuclear facilities and is using a "truth" poison to help get his answers. After all are exposed to the truth, Chuck soon discovers a lot about his partners.
9	9	"Chuck Versus the Imported Hard Salami"	Jason Ensler	Scott Rosenbaum & Matthew Miller	November 19, 2007	3T6458	7.79
Chuck starts dating Lou, a sandwich-maker, and things seem to be going really well, which incites some jealousy on behalf of Sarah, who discovers that her feelings for Chuck are more than just a cover. Things get complicated when Lou is discovered to be part of a smuggling group; although she believed it was smuggling only deli meats, such as imported hard salamis, when they also smuggled weapons. Chuck and Sarah have to defuse a bomb, fail and, expecting to die in the detonation, the pair share a passionate kiss as the timer runs out. They share an awkward moment when the "bomb" turns out to be something else entirely. Chuck leaves Lou and tries to start a genuine relationship with Sarah; however, Sarah finds out that her former lover Bryce Larkin is still alive. Meanwhile, Morgan starts developing a new relationship with Anna, another employee at Buy More.
10	10	"Chuck Versus the Nemesis"	Allison Liddi-Brown	Chris Fedak	November 26, 2007	3T6459	8.42
It's Thanksgiving and Chuck's nemesis, Bryce Larkin, returns after being thought dead earlier. Bryce needs Chuck to help prove to Sarah, Casey and the rest of the CIA that he is not a rogue agent. Upon seeing Bryce and Sarah back together, former partners and lovers, Chuck becomes jealous and doubts any future with Sarah. Meanwhile, Buy More is prepping for the biggest shopping day of the year and Morgan is left in charge.
11	11	"Chuck Versus the Crown Vic"	Chris Fisher	Zev Borow	December 3, 2007	3T6460	8.41
Chuck assumes the cover of Sarah's boyfriend on a mission to foil Lon Kirk (Michael Wiseman), a politically connected counterfeiter and yachtsman. When Sarah's mission on Kirk's yacht goes awry due to Chuck's insistence that Kirk is hiding money-counterfeiting printing-plates on his yacht, both Casey and Sarah suspects that Chuck is acting out of jealousy, which Chuck denies. Chuck later realizes that Kirk had hid the plates on the Taiwanese attache's boat and that he plans to blow up the boat to destroy the evidence and everyone on it, including Morgan and Anna. With Sarah and Casey's help, Chuck stops the boat from being blown up by redirecting the missile to target Casey's prized Crown Victoria instead. Chuck and Sarah reconcile at the annual Buy More holiday party.
12	12	"Chuck Versus the Undercover Lover"	Fred Toye	Phil Klemmer	January 24, 2008	3T6461	6.88
Chuck discovers that many Russian arms dealers are secretly meeting in Los Angeles. One particular Russian woman, Ilsa Trinchina, (Ivana Miličević), catches his attention, and he flashes on her as being Casey's ex-girlfriend. Chuck grows very intrigued and begins to pester Casey about their history. After learning this woman is set to marry one of the Russian arms dealers, Chuck insists that Casey fights for his woman. Meanwhile, Devon and Ellie reach a tough point in their relationship. Much of this episode contains references and parallels to Casablanca.
13	13	"Chuck Versus the Marlin"	Allan Kroeker	Matthew Lau	January 24, 2008	3T6462	7.02
As Devon deliberates on how he should propose to Ellie, he asks Chuck to hold on to the engagement ring. Chuck locks it in his Buy More locker but returns the next day to discover everything had been stolen from the store, including the ring. Meanwhile, Casey and Sarah find out that someone has been spying on them in hopes of discovering "the Intersect" and that they had hidden the receiver in Big Mike's large plastic marlin. With Chuck's identity and life on the line, the CIA and NSA decide to have Chuck relocated to a permanent holding cell.

== Reception ==
The first season averaged on, only including the first 11 episodes, 8.68 million viewers per episode.

=== UK BARB ratings ===
#	Episode	UK air date	Viewers (thousand)	Virgin1 rank (weekly)
1	"Chuck Versus the Intersect"	April 7, 2008	242	2
2	"Chuck Versus the Helicopter"	April 14, 2008	296	2
3	"Chuck Versus the Tango"	April 21, 2008	297	1
4	"Chuck Versus the Wookiee"	April 28, 2008	268	3
5	"Chuck Versus the Sizzling Shrimp"	May 5, 2008	153	8
6	"Chuck Versus the Sandworm"	May 12, 2008	326	1
7	"Chuck Versus the Alma Mater"	May 19, 2008	238	4
8	"Chuck Versus the Truth"	May 26, 2008	247	1
9	"Chuck Versus the Imported Hard Salami"	June 2, 2008	277	1
10	"Chuck Versus the Nemesis"	June 9, 2008	348	1
11	"Chuck Versus the Crown Vic"	June 16, 2008	297	1
12	"Chuck Versus the Undercover Lover"	June 23, 2008	274	1
13	"Chuck Versus the Marlin"	June 30, 2008	278	2

== Home media release ==
Chuck: The Complete First Season
Set Details			Special Features
13 Episodes; 4-Disc Set; Widescreen; Languages: English, Portuguese; Subtitles: English, Spanish, French, Chinese, Portuguese, Thai			Declassified Scenes; Chuck on Chuck: Series Stars Join Creators for Some Point/Counterpoint; Chuck's World: Character Development and Original Casting Sessions; Chuck Vs. the Chuckles: Gag Reel; Chuck's Online World: Gallery of Web-Originated Mini-Featurettes; (Note: Morgan's movie villains is NOT there. When choosing this option you get the Morgan audition stuff from disc 3 again)
Release Dates
United States; Canada	United Kingdom	Australia; New Zealand	Japan
September 16, 2008 (DVD); November 11, 2008 (Blu-ray)	August 18, 2008	TBA	June 3, 2009
