= Theo Alexander =

Greek actor

Theo Alexander Θοδωρής Ζουμπουλίδης
- Born: Theodoros Zoumpoulidis; Athens, Greece
- Occupation: Actor
- Years active: 2000–present

Theodoros Zoumpoulidis, better known as Theo Alexander, is a Greek actor appearing on stage, in film and on television. He had a role in the 2007 Greek film El Greco, but is perhaps best known internationally for his multi-episode appearance as Talbot in U.S. supernatural drama series True Blood.

== Early life and education ==
He was born as Theodoros Zoumpoulidis in Athens.

== Career ==
=== Filmography ===
Year	Title	Genre	Role	Notes
2007	El Greco	biographical	Manousos	credited as Theo Zouboulidis
2012	Meteora		Theodoros	

=== Television work ===
Year	Title	Genre	Role	Episode(s)	Notes
2007	Chuck	action-comedy	Stavros Demitrios	"Chuck Versus the Imported Hard Salami"	credited as Theodore Zouboulidis
2008	CSI: NY	police procedural	Charles Kohl	"Like Water For Murder"	credited as Theodore Zoumpoulidis
2008	Pushing Daisies	comedy-drama	Pierre	"Circus, Circus"	credited as Theodore Zoumpoulidis
2010	True Blood	supernatural drama	Talbot	7 episodes	
2021	42°C	erotic thriller	Markos	8 episodes	
