= Bryce Larkin =

- Chuck character
- Matt Bomer as Bryce Larkin
- First appearance: "Chuck Versus the Intersect"
- Last appearance: "Chuck Versus the Ring"
- Portrayed by: Matt Bomer

In-universe information
- Gender: Male
- Title: Officer
- Occupation: CIA Agent
- Affiliation: Government of the United States; Sarah Walker (partner, 2005-2007)
- Expertise: Highly trained in espionage, firearms and unarmed combat; high-level knowledge of Fulcrum and familiarity with the Ring; high-level knowledge of the Intersect project

Bryce Larkin is a spy on the comedy series Chuck on NBC. Bryce is the ex-college roommate and fraternity brother of the series' main character, Chuck Bartowski, and was formerly partnered and once romantically involved with Chuck's CIA handler Sarah Walker. Bryce was responsible for sending Chuck the Intersect, beginning the events of the series. He is portrayed by Matt Bomer.

== Biography ==
Most of what has been revealed about Bryce's background has been in dialogue, with some details provided in flashbacks. "Chuck Versus the Intersect" established that Bryce was originally from Connecticut. He attended Stanford University, where he met Chuck Bartowski on his first day of class in 1999. As shown in "Chuck Versus the Alma Mater," Chuck and Bryce quickly became friends because of their mutual interest in computers and video games. While in Stanford they wrote their own version of the classic computer game Zork in C++. The same episode also established that Bryce was friends with Jill Roberts, who would later begin dating Chuck. Bryce and Chuck enjoyed games of Gotcha! in the school library.

Bryce was recruited into the CIA by Professor George Fleming in 2002. The following year, Bryce learned that Fleming intended to recruit Chuck as well for the Omaha Project. As shown in "Chuck Versus the Alma Mater," Bryce sacrificed his close friendship with Chuck to protect Chuck from the government, which he told Fleming would destroy him. He conspired with the professor to frame Chuck for cheating on his exams, and Fleming expelled Chuck, claiming that Bryce tipped them off. To make matters worse, Jill Roberts told Chuck that she had left him for Bryce, a lie she told under the orders of a CIA splinter group called Fulcrum.

Because he protected Chuck from the government, he was the only spy Stephen J. Bartowski (a.k.a. Orion, the creator of the Intersect) would trust, and Bryce promised Orion not to let the Intersect fall into the wrong hands.

Sometime in 2005, Bryce was first partnered with Sarah Walker. At some point, their professional relationship spilled over into an intimate one and they became lovers. However, as established in "Chuck Versus the Nemesis," Bryce was later contacted by Fulcrum to steal the Intersect, leading to his separation from Sarah and the central events of the series.

== Series ==
At the beginning of the series, Bryce is shown on an apparent rogue mission stealing the Intersect from the National Intelligence Directorate. During his escape attempt, he sends the entire database to Chuck-using their custom Zork game as a code-just as he is shot (apparently fatally) by NSA Agent John Casey. Although Bryce only appears sporadically throughout the first two seasons, his theft of the Intersect and sending it to Chuck gives him an important place in the series' mythology, as his actions set the overall arc in motion.

Revelations about the events surrounding this theft and Bryce's motives are meted out over the course of the first two seasons. Bryce stole the Intersect to keep it out of Fulcrum's hands, and did so under Stephen Bartowski's guidance. But despite Stephen's wishes to keep Chuck out of it, Bryce sent the Intersect to Chuck because he knew Chuck could handle the Intersect and that Sarah would find Chuck.

Chuck was unaware of Bryce's work with the CIA and his apparent death until told about both by Sarah in "Chuck Versus the Intersect." Dialogue throughout the first half of the first season reinforces the appearance that Bryce's betrayals destroyed Chuck's life. Because Bryce had not informed Sarah of his plans, she initially believes he betrayed both her and his country. Chuck and Sarah attend his funeral in "Chuck Versus the Helicopter".

After the pilot, Bryce's next appearance is in flashbacks throughout "Chuck Versus the Alma Mater," when the team's mission takes them to Stanford and forces Chuck to confront his expulsion. The truth of events is revealed, and Chuck and Sarah realize that Bryce only betrayed him to protect him.

It is first revealed that Bryce survived being shot by Casey in "Chuck Versus the Imported Hard Salami." More information, including why he stole the Intersect, is revealed in the following episode, when Bryce introduces Chuck and the team to Fulcrum, whose agent, Tommy Delgado, Bryce deceived into believing he possessed the Intersect in his head. After defeating Tommy, Bryce is ordered by General Beckman to go into deep cover and pursue Fulcrum. According to Bryce, for all intents and purposes, he was to remain dead.

Bryce resurfaces again in "Chuck Versus the Break-Up" to obtain the team's assistance in recovering an update for the Intersect that was stolen by Fulcrum. The operation is nearly botched when Sarah abandons the assignment to protect Chuck, who had been captured. Bryce also continues to push Sarah on restarting their relationship before he is confronted by Devon Woodcomb, who tells Bryce that Sarah loves Chuck. Bryce attempts to warn Chuck off by telling him that Sarah's feelings for him endangered not only the mission but both her and Chuck's lives. Before disappearing, Bryce leaves Chuck a pair of sunglasses containing an Intersect update.

In Bryce's appearances leading into the second season finale, "Chuck Versus the Ring," he is used to derail Chuck and Sarah's developing relationship. However, in that episode he ultimately realizes Sarah's true love for Chuck, as she decides not to accompany Bryce on the new Intersect project, where Bryce is meant to be the human Intersect. Bryce is mortally wounded in "Chuck Versus the Ring" and asks Chuck to destroy the Intersect for him before dying from his injury. Chuck, knowing that the intel is essential for the CIA, and for lack of any option, sacrifices his normal future by taking Bryce's place as the human Intersect, uploading the Intersect 2.0 before destroying it.

In Chuck Versus First Class, Sarah told Daniel Shaw that she spread Bryce's ashes in Lisbon, Portugal where they took their first mission. It is unknown if this is in fact the truth or a lie Sarah told to cover her intent to go rogue with Chuck in Chuck Versus the Pink Slip.

== Development ==
Rumors of Bryce Larkin's return began to appear in early October, 2007. His return was confirmed with Matthew Bomer's cameo at the end of "Chuck Versus the Imported Hard Salami," although many reviewers noted that both the promo for the episode, and Bomer's name in the credits for the episode spoiled the ending. Bryce's return for "Chuck Versus the Nemesis" led to an increase in ratings to well over 8 million viewers for the night.

Bryce Larkin's return in Season Two was first revealed in June, 2008 and later confirmed in an interview with Chris Fedak, Josh Schwartz and Zachary Levi in August. IGN.com noted that once again, Bomer's return was spoiled by his name appearing in the credits of "Chuck Versus the Seduction."

=== Personality ===
Bryce Larkin is presented in the series as all the things Chuck is not: confident, athletic, brave under fire, and an excellent spy. Bryce is a skilled martial artist, and a fight scene in the Buy More in "Chuck Versus the Nemesis" proves that his and Sarah's abilities strongly complement each other. Further commendation of Bryce's abilities comes in "Chuck Versus the Nemesis" when Casey calls him dangerous, and later tells Chuck, "When you have a chance to shoot Bryce Larkin, you shoot to kill." In "Chuck Versus the Intersect," a party-goer who knew Bryce at Stanford embarrassed Chuck with all of Bryce's accomplishments while there. On several occasions Chuck has commented how short he falls in comparison with Bryce.

In "Chuck Versus the Intersect," Bryce is already acquainted with Casey, and their dialog together throughout "Chuck Versus the Nemesis" suggests that the two have an antagonistic past. Bryce is still in love with Sarah and has continued to pursue a relationship with her. He was hurt in "Chuck Versus the Break-Up" when he realized that Sarah had moved on and had feelings for Chuck. Bryce highly values his friendship with Chuck. He also highly regards Chuck's innocence, honesty and integrity. In fact, it is implied while Chuck looks up to him, Bryce looks up to Chuck for those reasons and he was willing to destroy that relationship to protect him from losing those traits. In "Chuck Versus the Nemesis," Bryce tells Chuck that Chuck is the only friend he really has, which begins to repair their damaged friendship. The two share many of the same interests, including computers, programming and video games. Both speak Klingon, which they successfully used as a code during a mission.

The series has not revealed how much of a relationship Bryce had with Chuck's family or other friends. Although Devon spoke with him face to face in "Chuck Versus the Break-Up," he didn't recognize Bryce. Morgan nearly did in "Chuck Versus the Nemesis," but passed it off as him just being a look-alike. Morgan was the first one to make it clear (inadvertently) to Bryce how badly his actions derailed Chuck's life after he was expelled.
