= Chuck (TV series) =

2007 American television series

- Genre: Action comedy; Romance; Spy drama
- Created by: Josh Schwartz; Chris Fedak
- Starring: Zachary Levi; Yvonne Strahovski; Joshua Gomez; Sarah Lancaster; Adam Baldwin; Ryan McPartlin; Mark Christopher Lawrence; Scott Krinsky; Vik Sahay; Julia Ling; Bonita Friedericy
- Opening theme: "Short Skirt/Long Jacket" (Instrumental) by Cake
- Composer: Tim Jones
- Country of origin: United States
- Original language: English
- No. of seasons: 5
- No. of episodes: 91 (list of episodes)

Production
- Executive producers: Josh Schwartz; Chris Fedak; Phil Laudicina; Robert Duncan McNeill; McG
- Production location: Burbank, California
- Running time: 40–46 minutes
- Production companies: College Hill Pictures, Inc. (2007–2010) (seasons 1–3); Fake Empire (2010–2012) (seasons 4–5); Wonderland Sound and Vision; Warner Bros. Television

Original release
- Network: NBC
- Release: September 24, 2007 – January 27, 2012

Chuck is an American action comedy spy drama television series created by Josh Schwartz and Chris Fedak. The series is about an "average-computer-whiz-next-door" named Chuck Bartowski, played by Zachary Levi, who receives an encoded email from an old college friend now working for the CIA. The message embeds the only remaining copy of a software program containing the United States's greatest spy secrets into Chuck's brain, leading the CIA and the NSA to assign him handlers and use him on top-secret missions.

Produced by Fake Empire (known as College Hill Pictures, Inc. during the first three seasons before folding afterwards), Wonderland Sound and Vision, and Warner Bros. Television, the series premiered on September 24, 2007, on NBC, airing on Monday nights at 8:00 p.m./7:00 p.m. Central. As the second season finished, flagging ratings put Chuck in danger of cancellation, but fans mounted a successful campaign to encourage NBC to renew the show. The campaign was unique in that fans specifically targeted a sponsor of the show, the Subway restaurant chain, leading to the chain striking a major sponsorship deal with NBC to help cover costs of the third season. The series' renewal was uncertain in each subsequent season. The fifth season was the last, beginning on October 28, 2011, and moving to Friday nights at 8 p.m./7 Central. The series concluded on January 27, 2012, with a two-hour finale.

== Episodes ==
Season	Episodes	Originally released	
Season	Episodes	First released	Last released
1	13	September 24, 2007	January 24, 2008
2	22	September 29, 2008	April 27, 2009
3	19	January 10, 2010	May 24, 2010
4	24	September 20, 2010	May 16, 2011
5	13	October 28, 2011	January 27, 2012

== Series summary ==
Chuck Bartowski (Zachary Levi) is in his mid-twenties and works at Buy More, a consumer-electronics chain store in Burbank, California. He is an intelligent, but unmotivated, computer service expert and works alongside his best friend, Morgan Grimes (Joshua Gomez). He had been expelled from Stanford University on false charges that he cheated in one of his classes, which likely damaged his drive and morale. He lives with his sister, Ellie (Sarah Lancaster), and her boyfriend, Devon "Captain Awesome" Woodcomb (Ryan McPartlin), both doctors who constantly encourage Chuck to make progress in his professional and romantic life.

Bryce Larkin (Matthew Bomer), Chuck's former Stanford University roommate and now a Central Intelligence Agency (CIA) agent, steals the Intersect, the entire merged database of the CIA and National Security Agency (NSA), and destroys the computer storing it. The sole surviving copy becomes subliminally embedded in Chuck's brain via encoded images when he opens an email from Bryce. The NSA's Major John Casey (Adam Baldwin) and CIA officer Sarah Walker (Yvonne Strahovski) are dispatched to investigate.

Chuck is recruited to use the knowledge he now possesses to help thwart assassins and international terrorists, upending his previously mundane life. The Intersect causes Chuck to receive involuntary "flashes" of information from the database, activated by triggers such as faces, voices, objects, and keywords. In order to protect his family and friends, Chuck must keep his second occupation a secret. Casey and Walker are assigned to watch over Chuck. They are forced to establish an uneasy alliance and cover identities. Walker poses as Chuck's girlfriend and takes a job at a fast food restaurant near the Buy More. Casey reluctantly becomes part of the Buy More sales team.

The main antagonists driving the plot are a series of rogue spy cabals, first internal to the United States intelligence community and then global in scope. A core part of the threat is the danger of the Intersect being either captured, making Chuck as much a liability as an asset to the government, or replicated, making Chuck obsolete or outmatched by less scrupulous spies.

Chuck, Sarah, and Casey all face professional conflicts as they grow to respect each other. A genuine romantic interest develops between Chuck and Sarah. Chuck's desire to maintain his close relationships and eventually return to a normal life is challenged by the dangers and growing responsibilities of his secret life, so that he gradually becomes a more competent, confident, and willing spy. In later seasons, upgrades to the Intersect would include skills in espionage as well as information (the reason the Intersect was originally conceived), giving Chuck temporary knowledge of hand-to-hand combat and other skills such as playing the guitar, using a zipline, foreign languages, dancing, and firearms training.

In the course of events, Chuck unravels mysteries from his life before the series, often dealing with the Intersect, such as why his parents left, why Bryce got him kicked out of Stanford, and why he is unusually suited for the Intersect. Meanwhile, Casey and Sarah confront unresolved issues from their lives before the series, including their families, Sarah's history with Bryce, and the spies they previously worked with. And as Chuck grows more comfortable with his own role, those closest to him are gradually drawn into his spy life.

== Cast and characters ==
=== Main cast ===
Character	Portrayed by	Seasons				
Character	Portrayed by	1	2	3	4	5
Charles "Chuck" Bartowski	Zachary Levi Joshua Rush	Main	Main	Main	Main	Main
Sarah Walker; Sam Lisa / Jenny Burton	Yvonne Strahovski Stefanie Scott Alexa Blair	Main	Main	Main	Main	Main
Colonel John Casey; Alex Coburn	Adam Baldwin Sterling Jones	Main	Main	Main	Main	Main
Morgan Grimes	Joshua Gomez Andy Pessoa	Main	Main	Main	Main	Main
Ellie Bartowski	Sarah Lancaster	Main	Main	Main	Main	Main
Devon Woodcomb	Ryan McPartlin	Recurring	Main	Main	Main	Main
Michael "Big Mike" Tucker	Mark Christopher Lawrence	Recurring	Main	Main	Main	Main
Lester Patel	Vik Sahay	Recurring	Main	Main	Main	Main
Jeffrey Barnes	Scott Krinsky	Recurring	Main	Main	Main	Main
Anna Wu	Julia Ling	Recurring	Main	Guest		
Diane Beckman	Bonita Friedericy	Recurring	Recurring	Recurring	Main	Recurring

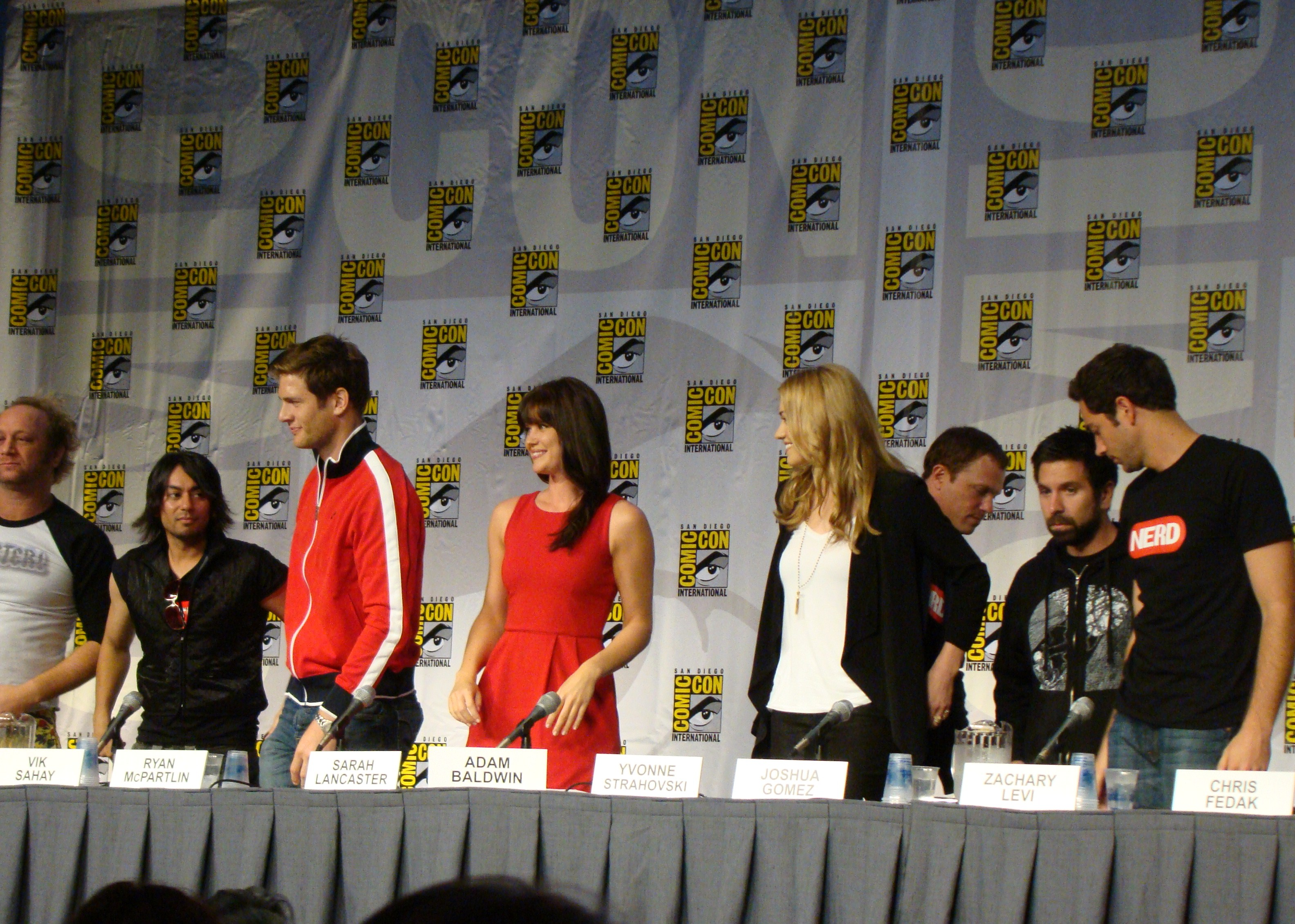
Chuck cast members at the 2010 San Diego Comic-Con

=== Recurring cast ===
- Tony Todd as Langston Graham (seasons 1, 2 and 5)
- Matthew Bomer as Bryce Larkin (seasons 1 and 2)
- C. S. Lee as Harry Tang (season 1)
- Rachel Bilson as Lou Palone (season 1)
- Mini Andén as Carina Miller (season 1, 3 and 4)
- Tony Hale as Emmett Milbarge (season 2 and 3) (Note: The character departed after the second season, then returned for one or more guest appearances in the third season.)
- John Larroquette as Roan Montgomery (seasons 2 and 4)
- Nicole Richie as Heather Chandler (seasons 2 and 4)
- Jordana Brewster as Jill Roberts (season 2)
- Arnold Vosloo as Vincent Smith (season 2)
- Chevy Chase as Ted Roark (season 2)
- Scott Bakula as Stephen Bartowski (seasons 2 and 3)
- Morgan Fairchild as Dr. Honey Woodcomb (seasons 2 and 4)
- Brandon Routh as Daniel Shaw (seasons 3 and 5)
- Kristin Kreuk as Hannah (season 3)
- Steve Austin as Hugo Panzer (seasons 3 and 4)
- Mekenna Melvin as Alex McHugh (seasons 3–5) (Note: The character made a few guest appearances in the third season, and became a recurring cast member in the fourth.)
- Linda Hamilton as Mary Elizabeth Bartowski (seasons 4 and 5)
- Timothy Dalton as Alexei Volkoff (season 4)
- Mercedes Masohn as Zondra Rizzo (season 4)
- Lauren Cohan as Vivian McArthur (season 4)
- Ray Wise as Riley (season 4)
- Robin Givens as Jane Bentley (season 4)
- Richard Burgi as Clyde Decker (seasons 4 and 5) (Note: The character made a guest appearance in the fourth season, and returned for a recurring role in the fifth.)
- Carrie-Anne Moss as Gertrude Verbanski (season 5)
- Angus Macfadyen as Nicholas Quinn (season 5)

== Production ==
=== Conception ===
The show is a mash-up. It's a combination of one part The Office, one part 24, one part Alias. When you mash those shows together, what happens? What we were really excited about is if you built the show like something like The Office, where you essentially met all these characters and you loved them, and then how terrifying it would be if Sydney Bristow or Jack Bauer suddenly came into The Office, because you knew, when those people showed up, that someone was going to get shot, and someone was going to get tortured, and someone was going to get killed. That's where the initial germ of the Chuck show came from.

— Co-creator Chris Fedak

Josh Schwartz and Chris Fedak wrote the script for the first episode, which was initially given a put pilot commitment by NBC before a pilot order was green lit by the network in January 2007. Schwartz and Fedak both attended the University of Southern California. Fedak pitched the idea to Schwartz, who agreed to develop the project with him. Joseph McGinty Nichol, Schwartz's fellow executive producer on The O.C., directed the first hour of the series and consequently became an executive producer via his production company, Wonderland Sound and Vision. Fedak, Peter Johnson, Scott Rosenbaum, Matthew Miller, and Allison Adler also serve as co-executive producers. NBC gave the series an early pick-up and a thirteen-episode order on May 10, 2007. On November 26, 2007, TV Guide reported that NBC had picked up the series for a full, 22 episode season.

=== Casting ===
Zachary Levi and Adam Baldwin were the first two to be cast in February 2007 in the roles of Chuck Bartowski and veteran NSA agent Major John Casey, respectively. Fedak always had Baldwin in mind for the role of John Casey and the producers found that the actor was a "perfect fit" for the character during the first casting session. Relative newcomer Yvonne Strahovski was chosen for the female lead role of what was then CIA officer Sarah Kent in the same month. Casting continued throughout March with Sarah Lancaster, Joshua Gomez, and Natalie Martinez landing the parts of Dr. Ellie Bartowski (Chuck's older sister), Morgan Pace (Chuck's best friend), and Kayla Hart (Chuck's neighbor and love interest), respectively. The Kayla Hart character was dropped before filming because creators Chris Fedak and Josh Schwartz found it unlikely and too complicated to the storyline that two women would be pining over Chuck. Morgan's surname was later changed to "Grimes" and Sarah's surname was changed to "Walker".

=== Filming locations ===
Although Chuck's apartment was set in Echo Park, the pilot was shot in El Cabrillo in Hollywood. After the series was picked up, the apartment and the building's courtyard were re-created on a Warner Bros. soundstage. Aerial views throughout the show combine shots of Echo Park and El Cabrillo.

The exterior shots of the Burbank Buy More where Chuck and Morgan work are of a former Mervyn's store in the Fallbrook Mall in West Hills. The inside of the Burbank Buymore was also built on the Warner Bros. lot.

=== Marketing ===
In May 2007, NBC announced that their official website would launch "MyNBC" allowing users to be more interactive with selected shows. MyNBC would allow fans to delve inside Chuck's "brain" which will host hot spots of top-secret government information that the title character possesses. It will also had bonus video features. In addition, NBC further announced in July 2007 that tie-in micro websites where fans who log onto Buy-More.net would be directed to NerdHerdHelp.com giving them access to exclusive content of the show and a blog written by the title character's best friend and sidekick, Morgan, would be launched in September 2007. NBC was expected to spend about $8 million in total promoting the show.

== Reception ==
=== Ratings ===
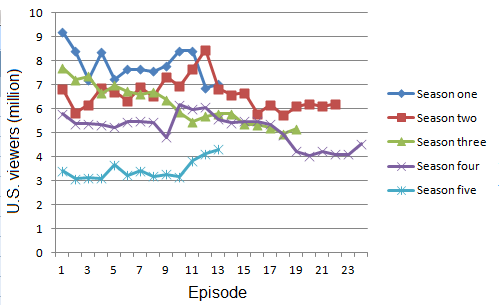
U.S. viewers for each episode in the series, broken down into its five seasons.

Despite heavy promotion from NBC and positive critical reviews, Chuck suffered in domestic ratings due to stiff competition from established hits from ABC (Dancing with the Stars), Fox (House), and CBS (How I Met Your Mother, Rules of Engagement) in the Monday 8:00–9:00 pm ET timeslot. Its ratings were also affected by the 2007–2008 Writers Guild of America strike in the first season and President Barack Obama's prime time news conference that led to the show being preempted for a week in the second season, shortly after NBC had done heavy promotion for the show around the Super Bowl. In May 2010, it was reported that Chuck ranked in the top 20 TV shows in the SocialSenseTV ratings report of social media interactions, measuring posts and reads on forums, blogs, and other social media over a three-month period.

Season	Timeslot (ET)	Season premiere	Season finale	TV season	Rank	U.S. viewers in millions
1	Monday 8:00 p.m.	September 24, 2007	January 24, 2008	2007–2008	#65	8.68
2	Monday 8:00 p.m.	September 29, 2008	April 27, 2009	2008–2009	#71	7.36
3	Monday 8:00 p.m.	January 10, 2010	May 24, 2010	2009–2010	#82	5.99
4	Monday 8:00 p.m.	September 20, 2010	May 16, 2011	2010–2011	#101	5.58
5	Friday 8:00 p.m.	October 28, 2011	January 27, 2012	2011–2012	#138	4.25

=== Critical reception ===
In its first year, Chuck received critical acclaim. Rolling Stone magazine included the show on its fall 2007 "We Like to Watch" list, saying the show "wipes the floor with the other fall debuts". Chuck landed on USA Today's list of the "10 Picks for 2007" and they called Levi's performance "incredibly winning", giving the comedy three-out-of-four stars. Chuck drew numerous comparisons to another critically acclaimed comedy that debuted in Fall 2007—Reaper—which also starred a twenty-something underachiever who works in a large retail, "big-box" store (Work Bench) and is drawn into heroism against his will.

As 2008 drew to a close, the show received further acclaim. In December Time magazine named the show one of the top 10 TV series of the year. It also made the year-end top 10 list of the Chicago Tribune, Television Without Pity's list of TV Shows We Wish More People Watched, The Star-Ledger's Top TV shows of 2008 (#4), The Miami Herald's TV's Top 5 list, The New York Observer's Top 10 TV Shows of the Year (#6), and the Pittsburgh Post-Gazette mentions Chuck as one of the few bright spots in television in 2008.

The Chicago Tribune's Maureen Ryan wrote that "the show pays attention to the mechanics of storytelling and doesn't just try to coast on the comedy." She continued, "[Given] the level of attention paid to all those other things—emotion, suspense, plotting, character—Chuck ends up being one of the TV scene's greatest pleasures at the moment." Television Without Pity's Angel Cohn finds Chuck to be a well-written show, saying "it features some of the smartest and most quick-witted dialogue on TV". She praises the ensemble cast and notes "while the first season was good, this show has really hit its stride in its second season." James Poniewozik of Time magazine says the show is a "delight" and that with the second season the "new episodes quickly jump back in, with higher stakes and sharper jokes." The Star-Ledger's Alan Sepinwall calls Chuck "the most purely entertaining show currently on television, whether you're talking network or cable." He states that "what makes Chuck so special ... is that there's a fundamental warmth and humanity underneath the jokes", with "a cast of appealing characters played by very good actors."

Going into 2010, Aaron Barnhart of the Kansas City Star described the show's premise as "fresh, appealing and limited", expressing concern that "a lot of TV shows overstay their welcome" and fearing that in its third season the show is "about to run out of new, workable ideas". USA Today called the show NBC's "best scripted hour".

In an article in The Journal of Popular Culture, Joseph J. Darowski recognizes the series' exploration of technology's impact on individual identity. He discusses the series' themes as a natural progression of the popular culture tradition of man-made technology encroaching first into nature, then into human bodies, and finally into human minds.

=== Awards and honors ===
Season 1 of Chuck enjoyed much formal recognition. The program was mentioned multiple times in IGN's 2007 year-in-review awards. Along with winning the honor of Best New TV Series, Sarah Walker won the award for best TV character, and Chuck and Sarah as a couple won the "Couple That We Rooted for the Most" award. Chuck was also nominated for "Best New TV Comedy Series" at the 2008 People's Choice Awards, which aired on January 8, 2008, but lost to Samantha Who? The series stunt coordinator Merritt Yohnka won the 2007–2008 Primetime Emmy for "Outstanding Stunt Coordination". Chuck was also nominated for "Outstanding Main Title Design" in 2007, but did not win. Merritt Yohnka also won the 2008–2009 Primetime Emmy for "Outstanding Stunt Coordination", back-to-back wins for the same award.

Award	Year	Category	Nominee(s)	Result
ALMA Award	2008	Outstanding Male Performance in a Comedy Television Series	Joshua Gomez	Nominated
ALMA Award	2009	Outstanding Actor in a Comedy Series	Joshua Gomez	Nominated
ALMA Award	2011	Outstanding Actor in a Comedy Series	Joshua Gomez	Nominated
American Cinema Editors	2008	Best Edited One-Hour Series for Commercial Television	Norman Buckley	Won
Casting Society of America	2011	Outstanding Achievement in Casting – Television Pilot – Comedy	Patrick Rush	Nominated
Image Awards	2011	Outstanding Directing in a Comedy Series for "The Couch Lock"	Michael Shultz	Nominated
Emmy Awards	2008	Outstanding Stunt Coordination	Merritt Yohnka (for "Chuck Versus the Undercover Lover")	Won
Emmy Awards	2008	Outstanding Main Title Design	Karin Fong; Jonathan Gershon; Dana Yee	Nominated
Emmy Awards	2009	Outstanding Stunt Coordination	Merritt Yohnka (for "Chuck Versus The First Date")	Won
Emmy Awards	2010	Outstanding Stunt Coordination	Merritt Yohnka (for "Chuck Versus the Tic Tac")	Nominated
SFX Awards	2011	Best Actress	Yvonne Strahovski	Nominated
People's Choice Awards	2008	Favorite New TV Comedy	—	Nominated
Satellite Awards	2007	Best Actor in a Series, Comedy or Musical	Zachary Levi	Nominated
Satellite Awards	2007	Best Television Series, Comedy or Musical	—	Nominated
TV Guide Awards	2011	Favorite Actress	Yvonne Strahovski	Won
TV Guide Awards	2011	Favorite Couple Who Has	Zachary Levi & Yvonne Strahovski	Won
TV Guide Awards	2011	Favorite Villain	Timothy Dalton	Won
Saturn Award	2008	Best Actor on Television	Zachary Levi	Nominated
Saturn Award	2008	Best Network Television Series	—	Nominated
Teen Choice Awards	2008	Choice TV Breakout Star Male	Zachary Levi	Nominated
Teen Choice Awards	2010	Actor – Action	Zachary Levi	Won
Teen Choice Awards	2010	Actress – Action	Yvonne Strahovski	Won
Teen Choice Awards	2010	Choice TV Show: Action	—	Nominated
Teen Choice Awards	2011	Actor – Action	Zachary Levi	Nominated
Teen Choice Awards	2011	Actress – Action	Yvonne Strahovski	Nominated
Teen Choice Awards	2011	Choice TV Show: Action	—	Nominated
Teen Choice Awards	2012	Actor – Action	Zachary Levi	Nominated
Teen Choice Awards	2012	Actress – Action	Yvonne Strahovski	Nominated
Teen Choice Awards	2012	Choice TV Show: Action	—	Nominated
Young Artist Awards	2009	Best Performance in a TV Series – Guest Starring Young Actress	Stefanie Scott	Nominated
IGN	2010	Best of 2010 – Best Villain	Brandon Routh	Won

=== Campaign for series renewal, 2009 ===
Despite being one of the first series to be renewed by NBC for the 2008–2009 television season, Chuck was classified as a show "on the bubble" between renewal and cancellation in April 2009 after NBC decided to delay its decision on its renewal for a third season until early May. The show's second season did not improve on or maintain the audience numbers received in the first season and consistently obtained low ratings, making it one of the least-watched shows in its Monday 8:00 pm ET timeslot. Concerned that the show would not be renewed for a third season, fans launched a "Save Chuck" campaign that gained momentum with the use of social-networking websites like Twitter and Facebook.

Fansite ChuckTV.net launched the first organized fan effort, the Watch/Buy/Share campaign (an idea thought up by "Chuck, vs the podcast" founder Gray Jones), on March 18, 2009; a letter writing campaign was later added to the effort. The week of April 6, 2009, television blogger Kath Skerry changed the name of her website GiveMeMyRemote.com to GiveMeMyChuck.com and used Twitter to notify her readers to support the show, prompting television columnists Alan Sepinwall of The Star-Ledger, Maureen Ryan of Chicago Tribune and Josef Adalian of TelevisionWeek to write Chuck-related news on their websites and Twitter feeds. Sepinwall also wrote an open letter to NBC on reasons for renewal, while Ryan encouraged fan support by listing the various ways they could contribute to the campaign to save Chuck. One fan, Wendy Farrington, was inspired by a product placement in second-season episodes to organize a campaign to purchase "Footlong" submarine sandwiches from Subway on the air date of the second-season finale. This movement gained support from various cast and crew members, with actor Zachary Levi seen leading hundreds of fans to a Subway restaurant in Birmingham, England. Members of the show's cast and crew participated in a special "rally cry" episode of Chuck vs the Podcast on April 24, 2009, just before the season finale, to encourage fans to keep the campaign going and thank them for their support. On the campaign, co-creator Josh Schwartz remarked that it "has been one of the most amazing experiences of [his] life to witness—and certainly the most creatively gratifying". Other fan efforts include the "Have a Heart, Renew Chuck" campaign, involving Chuck fans donating money to the American Heart Association on behalf of NBC. By the NBC Upfront on May 19, 2009, over $17,000 was raised.

The campaign also prompted press and media coverage, with The Hollywood Reporter calling Chuck the "most discussed bubble show online". Linda Holmes, writing for NPR, noted the support the campaign has received from both fans and critics, and comments: "It's very common for chasms to open between critics and viewers... But here, critics find themselves passionately advocating for something that's extraordinarily enjoyable to watch." James Poniewozik of Time magazine wrote about the efficacy of save-this-show columns and fan protests, saying, "The sad fact of advertising-supported television is that, unlike cable, it still rewards breadth, not depth, of viewership. Four million people who watch a show really hard are still just four million people to an ad buyer. Unless they spend money." He stated that the "Finale & Footlong" campaign was a far more effective way to demonstrate support since Subway is one of the show's major sponsors. However, Josh Bernoff of Advertising Age remarks, "Thousands of visible, loyal viewers does not equal millions of actual viewers. Objects in the groundswell may be smaller than they appear. People who congregate online are not a representative sample."

In support of the show, Nestlé sent more than 1,000 packs of its Wonka Nerds candies to NBC after Josh Schwartz made such a suggestion to fans in an April 20, 2009, interview with The New York Times. Additionally, Chuck won the annual "Save Our Shows" poll by USA Today in which 43,000 people voted, topping the poll with 54% of respondents favoring renewal, beating other bubble shows such as Cold Case (45%) and Without a Trace (41%). The petition campaigns were also mentioned on the May 12, 2009, episode of The Daily Show with Jon Stewart.

NBC's decision to renew the show for a thirteen-episode third season was announced on May 17, 2009. At that time, both NBC's Ben Silverman and co-creator Chris Fedak confirmed that there was an option nine more episodes. Although Silverman said that NBC was not looking to lower costs, Schwartz said that series production studio Warner Bros. Television had asked the producers to make budget cuts to meet a decrease in the license fee by NBC. Silverman, Fedak and Schwartz promised that the show's quality would not be impacted.

By October 28, 2009, NBC had picked up an additional six episodes for a total of 19 episodes in Season 3.

=== Series renewal, 2010 ===
Questions about the series' continued viability began before the third season aired. Just hours before the third-season premiere, when asked whether NBC suddenly moving Jay Leno out of primetime lowered the bar for Chuck, NBC chairman Jeff Gaspin replied, "I wouldn't say the bar's lower, but we obviously have less choice at the moment, so he's got a better shot."

When asked about the series' chances of being renewed for a fourth season and whether fans would have to step in again, Angela Bromstad replied, "Well, it's got to maintain, and it depends on development," but said that the show is a "pleasant surprise, and they're doing great work."

The ratings for Chuck slipped, falling to a series-low 1.9 demo for two weeks running as of the 11th episode of the season, "Chuck Versus the Final Exam." The "TV By The Numbers" website reported on March 23, 2010, that this was "below the ratings level that would indicate likely renewal" despite the overall ratings difficulties that NBC was facing. However, on March 30, 2010, the season's 12th episode, "Chuck Versus the American Hero" saw an increase to a 2.1 share and a 0.2 million viewer rise.

Chuck was also a contestant in E!'s online Save One Show contest for the second year running, where it won with 52% of the vote. The runner up was One Tree Hill, which garnered 20% of the vote.

On May 13, 2010, it was announced that Chuck had been renewed by NBC for a fourth season. The season received a 13-episode order with an option of an additional nine episodes. The fourth season premiered during NBC's fall 2010 schedule. It retained its current timeslot. The premiere episode of the fourth season was titled "Chuck Versus the Anniversary", and aired on September 20. Season four guest starred Linda Hamilton, Dolph Lundgren, Harry Dean Stanton, Olivia Munn, Steve Austin, Dave Batista, Summer Glau, Timothy Dalton and Eric Roberts. It was announced on October 19, 2010, that NBC had ordered an additional 11 episodes of Chuck, bringing the episode total for Season 4 to 24.

Speculating on the possibility of a fifth season, Yvonne Strahovski (Sarah Walker) commented that she felt "...[the chances] are pretty good, I will be surprised if we don't get a season five." Her co-star Adam Baldwin (John Casey) concurred.

=== Series renewal, 2011 ===
It was announced on May 13, 2011, that Chuck would be renewed for a fifth, and final, season consisting of thirteen episodes, set to premiere on October 21, 2011. The show was moved from Monday and aired on Friday nights, in what some consider to be a Friday night death slot. The premiere was later pushed a week later to October 28.

== Broadcast and distribution ==
=== Broadcast history ===
The first showing of the pilot occurred on July 27, 2007, at San Diego Comic-Con. The series was originally slated to air on Tuesday nights at 9/8c as announced at the 2007 upfronts but this was later changed to Monday nights at 8/7c as announced during the 2007 Television Critics Association summer press tour. The season premiere aired on September 24, 2007, on NBC. The pilot was leaked onto torrent websites on July 22, 2007. All thirteen episodes produced before the 2007 Writers Guild of America strike have aired. The last two episodes of the original thirteen aired on January 24, 2008, with episode 12 airing at 8/7c and episode 13 at 10/9c, three days after they aired in Canada.

Despite receiving a full season pickup, the first season contained only thirteen episodes; production was stalled due to the 2007–2008 Writers Guild of America strike.

Season Two premiered on September 29, 2008. While the series originally had a 13 episode order, NBC ordered another nine, ensuring the series would get the full 22-episode treatment. The theme song is "Short Skirt/Long Jacket" by Cake.

On February 2, 2009, Chuck broadcast a full-length 3D television episode. The episode was broadcast using the ColorCode 3-D stereoscopy system, and could be viewed by wearing a pair of glasses distributed as part of a national promotion for the movie Monsters vs. Aliens, which was sponsored by Intel.

Season 4 appeared on the fall lineup and later received an order for 11 additional episodes on October 18, 2010.

In the United Kingdom, season 1-3 were broadcast on Virgin 1 and Season 4 on Sky Living. In June 2022, all seasons became available on ITV Hub.

=== Online distribution ===
In an aggressive marketing campaign by NBC, the pilot episode was released across a broad range of media from satellite broadcasting to popular social networking websites such as Facebook, shown on United Airlines flights, freely distributed on video on demand on about 30 cable and satellite systems including Comcast, Time Warner Cable, Cox Communications and Dish Network, on Yahoo, and from Amazon Unbox. Also, prior to the airing of Chuck in the United Kingdom, the pilot episode was released as a free temporary download on iTunes.

A full week before the second season's U.S. premiere, iTunes offered a free download of the first episode as a 'pre-air premiere'. This promotion was also available on the Xbox Live Marketplace. Chuck can also be seen on Virgin Media's On Demand service in association with Warner TV

All episodes of Seasons 1 through 5 are available for purchase in the U.S. at the iTunes Store, PlayStation Network, Amazon Video, and Xbox Live Marketplace.

=== Home media ===
Complete Season	Ep #	Release dates		
Complete Season	Ep #	Region 1	Region 2	Region 4
1st	13	September 16, 2008 (DVD); November 11, 2008 (Blu-ray Disc)	August 18, 2008	November 12, 2008
2nd	22	January 5, 2010	October 5, 2009	April 7, 2010
3rd	19	September 7, 2010	October 25, 2010	March 2, 2011
4th	24	October 11, 2011	October 3, 2011	February 1, 2012
5th	13	May 8, 2012	October 15, 2012	August 1, 2012

Both the DVD and Blu-ray Disc box sets are distributed by Warner Home Video.

The DVD and Blu-ray Disc box sets of The Complete First Season contain the same special features: deleted scenes ("Declassified Scenes"); "Chuck's World—an inside look at character development and casting sessions"; "Chuck on Chuck"—commentaries by Zachary Levi, Joshua Gomez, Josh Schwartz and Chris Fedak; bloopers ("Chuck vs. the Chuckles"); and "Chuck's Online World—a gallery of web originated mini-featurettes".

On October 28, 2009, Warner Home Video announced that the second season of Chuck would be released on January 5, 2010. Like its predecessor, Chuck: The Complete Second Season was made available in both DVD and Blu-ray Disc formats. Time magazine put the DVD on its short list for January 2010, saying "Nerd wish fulfillment doesn't get funnier than this."

"The Complete Third Season" was released on September 7, 2010, on both DVD and Blu-ray Disc in Region 1 and October 25, 2010.

On June 1, 2011, Warner Home Video announced that the fourth season of Chuck release date for both DVD and Blu-ray Disc was September 6, 2011, but this was changed to October 11, 2011.

In February 2012 Warner Brothers announced a complete Seasons 1-5 box set available on both Blu-ray and DVD to be released May 8 in conjunction with the Season 5 box set. This box set contains 19 discs (Blu-ray) or 23 discs (DVD) and includes all special features available in current releases.

In the UK, only DVD box sets are released and not Blu-ray. Chuck Season 5 was released on September 24, 2012, on iTunes in the UK with the release of the DVD box set being released less than a month later on October 15, 2012.

In Australia, the complete Seasons 1-5 DVD box set became available on August 1, 2012, in conjunction with the release of the Season 5 DVD set. Chuck has also been released individually on Blu-Ray alongside the DVD releases.

== Other media ==
=== Comics ===
Wildstorm, a DC Comics imprint, produced a six-issue mini-series written by Peter Johnson and Zev Borow (series co-executive producer and writer, respectively), with art by Jeremy Haun and Phil Noto. It started in June 2008. A trade paperback collection was published in July 2009. It also includes a public service announcement on brushing one's teeth from Captain Awesome and two gag adventures with Morgan based on film noir and The Odyssey. (WildStorm also releases Brian K. Vaughan's Ex Machina, a series which sees its main character fused with a technological structure, issue No. 39 of which is used within Chuck to conceal the Intersect Operating manual from General Beckman, Casey and Sarah for Chuck's studies from Season 2, episode No. 17 onwards.)

=== Charitable Reunion ===
On April 17, 2020, Entertainment Weekly reunited the entire cast to do a table read via Zoom of the Season 3, Episode 9. The reunion was part of EW's #UnitedAtHome campaign. It also served as a charity drive for Feeding America's COVID-19 Response Fund.

== Possible film ==
In March 2013, Levi told Entertainment Weekly that Warner Brothers' use of Kickstarter to fund previously shut-down TV series could possibly open the door for a Chuck film. However, he cited conflicts with Chuck broadcasts in other countries, such as Japan, as the main reason that a film would not be started anytime soon. In March 2017, Levi told Larry King that he was "working on it" (the film) and that it was a "steady but sure process". In March 2020, Levi told on Instagram Live session that he is still interested in making the film happen. In December 2021, Levi told Robert Littal of Black Sports Online that he would love to see a Chuck movie while speaking about his movie American Underdog, which starred Levi and his former Chuck co-star Adam Baldwin.

== See also ==
- Action comedy § Television
