= Chuck Versus the Tic Tac =

- Chuck episode
- Episode no.: Season 3 Episode 10
- Directed by: Patrick Norris
- Written by: Rafe Judkins; Lauren LeFranc
- Production code: 3X5810
- Original air date: March 15, 2010

Guest appearances
- Clare Carey as Kathleen McHugh; Bonita Friedericy as Diane Beckman; Sterling Jones as Alex Coburn; Mekenna Melvin as Alex McHugh; Robert Patrick as Col. James Keller; Greg Roman as Stanley Fitzroy

Episode chronology
← Previous "Chuck Versus the Beard"	Next → "Chuck Versus the Final Exam"

"Chuck Versus the Tic Tac" is the tenth episode of the third season of the television series Chuck, airing on March 15, 2010. When Casey's former commanding officer returns, Chuck and Sarah take it upon themselves to clear his name when he is arrested for treason. Meanwhile, Devon and Ellie are at odds over their future when Ellie receives her dream fellowship.

== Plot summary ==
=== Main Plot ===
As the episode begins, Marine 2nd Lt. Alex Coburn is being reviewed by a ranking officer regarding his application to special forces training while in Honduras in 1989. His promotion is declined, however as he walks out of the command tent, he is stopped by Col. James Keller (Robert Patrick). Keller offers him a chance to live his dream on a top-secret NSA black ops team. Twenty-one years later, Casey is meeting the same Col. Keller, his former commanding officer, in his apartment. Keller advises him his team will be testing government security, and during the mission orders him to retrieve something from one of the secured vaults. Outside, Morgan is practicing his spy techniques when he is interrupted by Chuck. Chuck sees Keller leave, and finds Casey's behavior suspicious. Later at Castle, Beckman issues the team their orders to test the security at a secret government holding facility. Utilizing their skills and the Intersect, the team successfully reaches the vault. Chuck and Casey enter while Sarah stands guard outside, and while Chuck breaks into their target Casey slips away to open another, removing a nondescript pill and slipping it in his gear. Chuck sees this, and when confronted, Casey aims his gun at Chuck and threatens him if he says anything about it.

Back at Castle, Beckman congratulates the team on their success, but reveals the test came too late: Someone has already broken into the vault and stolen a prototype drug called Laudanol, an emotional suppressant designed for agents to control their feelings in the field. Chuck immediately asks if it could help him control the Intersect properly and realizes that was what Casey had removed from the vault. Believing that it was a loyalty test as part of their mission, Chuck reveals he saw Casey steal it. As Sarah reaches for her gun, and Beckman confronts Casey, he chooses to plead the 5th to avoid incriminating himself and is arrested. While a government team searches Casey's apartment for the drug, Chuck corners Morgan and views the tape he made of Casey's conversation with Keller. Chuck flashes and realizes that Keller works for the Ring and that Casey does not know his commanding officer is a traitor. He confronts Sarah while she assists in the search of Casey's apartment, and insists they have to help him. Despite the risks, Sarah admits she's happy to see Chuck willing to help Casey and agrees. The two re-infiltrate the base in hopes their security recommendations have not yet been implemented, but are defeated almost immediately. When cornered by a team led by the security specialist, Chuck and Sarah play to his ego and convince him they are there to review the changes. He then leads them safely to the lower levels where, after another alert is triggered, Sarah knocks him out and steals the keycard needed to access the prisoner holding cells but they are too late. An explosion rocks the facility, and they enter in time to see Keller and his men breaking Casey out. Chuck tries to warn Casey that Keller is with the Ring, but Casey admits he already knows.

Chuck and Sarah attempt to escape, but are apprehended and taken to Castle where they meet with Beckman. Beckman reveals that after opening Casey's sealed file, she discovered that he is actually the same Alexander Coburn whose name Chuck previously flashed on (in "Chuck Versus the Fake Name") and was recruited by Keller. Coburn was officially killed in action in Honduras on the same day John Casey appeared as a new recruit on Keller's black ops team. Beckman orders the team to find and apprehend Casey, dead or alive. Meanwhile, Casey tries to use Morgan to recover the drug from where he hid it in the Buy More, which Chuck had already deduced. He corners Morgan and, playing on his desire to help out on a mission, recovers the pill. Chuck then returns home where Casey is waiting, having guessed Chuck would know where to look. He threatens to kill Chuck if he does nt turn over the drug, but Chuck gambles on their friendship and that Casey would be unable to pull the trigger. As Sarah moves in from behind, Casey backs down. He admits to the team that Keller is blackmailing him into recovering the Laudanol and Casey left behind a fiancee named Kathleen McHugh (Alexandra Bromstad in flashbacks/Clare Carey present day) when he faked his death. Keller is using her as leverage, and is threatening to kill her if Casey does not do as he says. Chuck and Sarah convince Casey they can stop Keller and save Kathleen together.

While Chuck heads to Kathleen's home, Casey arrives at his meeting with Keller. There, Casey reveals he has double-crossed his commander by replacing the Laudanol with a Tic Tac (Keller had given Casey a box as a reminder of home when he recruited him in Honduras). Sarah ambushes Keller's guards while Casey engages Keller. Meanwhile, Chuck tries to get Kathleen out of the house but instead locks her in a closet when Keller's men arrive. Keller tries again to turn Casey, but Casey realizes Keller would have killed Kathleen regardless, and snaps his neck. Chuck warns the team he was unable to get Kathleen out and cannot flash, and Casey tells him to take the Laudanol. The Laudanol enables Chuck to flash, and he brutally defeats Keller's men. He is prepared to kill the last of the goons with his bare hands when Casey and Sarah finally arrive, and stops himself when Sarah calls on him to stop, realizing what he nearly did. Casey is reunited with Kathleen who does not recognize him, but does not tell her who he really is. As the team leaves, Kathleen's daughter arrives, having seen the police outside. Casey is astonished when he realizes that Alex McHugh (Mekenna Melvin) is his daughter, but stands by his decision not to involve himself in their lives.

At Castle, Beckman drops any charges against the team for their actions, but Casey is summarily dismissed to civilian life and removed from the team. As Chuck escorts Casey out of Castle, Beckman offers Sarah a post in Washington, D.C. Later at Casey's, Chuck tries to convince him he can still have a chance with the family he never knew he had, but Casey declines, stating the choice he made between love and country was the right one for him. Casey then tells him not to waste his chance with Sarah. Sarah, meanwhile, has returned to D.C. to visit Shaw. When asked by the cabbie if she lives there, she only answers that she's thinking about moving to the area.

=== Ellie and Devon ===
Devon is still attempting to convince Ellie to join Doctors without Borders with him as a means of getting her safely away from Chuck's spy life, and tries to get Chuck to talk her into it. However Ellie confides in her brother she has received a neurology fellowship at USC, a job she has dreamed of since she was a child. Devon is less than thrilled, as he sees getting out of the country as a way to protect Ellie from any danger brought on by Chuck's spy life. The two get into an argument and, when going to see Chuck to settle the matter, run into Morgan instead. Devon takes Morgan aside to try and convince him to support him, and in the course of their discussion each discovers that the other knows Chuck's secret. Ultimately, Morgan agrees with Devon, but the argument is unsettled. Later on, Ellie finally manages to discuss things with Chuck, and decides to go with Devon. When she arrives home to tell him, she instead finds him throwing a private celebration for her, and he admits that it is Ellie's happiness that matters, and agrees to support her.

== Production ==
On October 22, 2009 the official title of the episode was released, with the official casting call going out on October 27. Additional casting and synopses details becoming available in February 2010. On November 10, 2009, actor Robert Patrick was announced in the role of Col. James Keller.

=== Production details ===
- The episode reveals that Casey's former sensei, Ty Bennett, was actually working for the Ring when he attempted to recruit Casey, and that Col. Keller was the man responsible for turning Bennett in the first place.
- The revelation that "John Casey" did not come into existence until 1989 appears to conflict some other details of Casey's past, notably his actions against Premier Alejandro Goya. Casey was also seen speaking to his "mother" and calling himself by the name "Johnny Boy" in "Chuck Versus Santa Claus".
- In Chuck's flash of Col. Keller, the data indicates that he received a dishonorable discharge. However, commissioned officers such as Keller (and Casey) cannot be dishonorably discharged and are instead dismissed, typically as part of sentencing from a court-martial.
- The number of the locker that Casey opens to retrieve the pill in the CIA underground facility, 092407, is a reference to the show's premiere date, September 24, 2007

=== Flashes ===
- Chuck flashes on gymnastics to make it past a trap in the first level of the team's test of the holding facility's security.
- A flash on Keller reveals his connections to the Ring.
- Chuck flashes again to attempt to pass through the same level of the holding facility as before, but fails when he runs into a newly added barrier.
- Chuck defeats Keller's operatives sent to murder Kathleen after flashing on highly advanced martial arts, nunchaku combat, gymnastics, and close-quarters combat, all at once. His ability to master these skills was aided by his use of the Laudanol drug.

=== References to popular culture ===
- Col. Keller's character played by Robert Patrick is very similar to the character he plays in the show The Unit (2006-2009). Patrick plays the role of Colonel Thomas Ryan (call-sign "Dog Patch 06") in where he is the commander of the U.S. Army's Delta Force (1st Special Forces Operational Detachment-Delta).

== Reception ==
"Chuck Versus the Tic Tac" was watched by 5.8m total viewers, with a 1.9/6 in the demos. Although notably down, the ratings for all shows on Monday were universally down from the previous week.

The episode was met with nearly universal critical praise. While TVFanatic.com noted the 15-level assault mission as "video game-esque" and "definitely pushing just how cheesy we can forgive the show for being," they lauded the action scenes, comedy, and character development.

Alan Sepinwall found an episode forcing the typically stoic Casey to face a painful moment from his past as a great showcase for both the character and actor Adam Baldwin, and further praising the action scenes as well as the return to the dynamic between the three main characters largely missing from the third season.
