= Chuck Versus the Mask =

- Chuck episode
- Episode no.: Season 3 Episode 7
- Directed by: Michael Schultz
- Written by: Phil Klemmer
- Production code: 3X5807
- Original air date: February 8, 2010

Guest appearances
- Kristin Kreuk as Hannah; Henri Lubatti as Nicos Vassilis; Jim Piddock as Museum curator; Brandon Routh as Daniel Shaw

Episode chronology
← Previous "Chuck Versus the Nacho Sampler"	Next → "Chuck Versus the Fake Name"

"Chuck Versus the Mask" is the seventh episode of the third season of Chuck which originally aired February 8, 2010. Chuck is forced to involve Hannah in the team's latest mission. Meanwhile, Morgan and Ellie attempt to investigate Chuck's secret life.

== Plot summary ==
=== Main plot ===
After Shaw is trapped in a museum vault attempting to steal a golden mask of Alexander the Great, Sarah and Casey call in Chuck to hack into the museum's systems to release him. Hannah tags along, and after successfully freeing Shaw and restoring the system, the two are invited by the museum curator to attend the gala for the unveiling of the mask that night to monitor the computer systems. Under Shaw's instruction, Chuck agrees. At Castle, Shaw briefs the team with their belief that the Ring is using the mask to smuggle a chemical weapon through customs. That night, Chuck and Hannah watch the gala from the control room, while Shaw and Sarah attend as a couple in order to make their way into the vault and swap the mask for a duplicate. However, Chuck flashes on a Ring operative named Nicos Vassilis, and leaves Hannah alone to warn Shaw and Sarah. Shaw is forced to withdraw, as the man knows him, so Chuck takes over to break into the vault with Sarah. Chuck causes a server crash to prevent the vault from opening, which Hannah is left alone to fix.

As Chuck lowers Sarah into the vault through an overhead hatch to make the switch, he is interrupted by one of Vassilis's henchmen, who throws him down the hatch, pulling Sarah back up. Sarah deals with the first henchman as well as a second who arrives during the fight while Chuck steals the real mask and swaps it out with the fake. Meanwhile, Hannah attempts to fix the server crash while Shaw uses a back-door connection through Chuck's laptop (where Hannah is working) to keep it down until they can finish. Sarah pulls Chuck back up and Hannah restores the system just in time. The team returns to Castle where Sarah and Shaw analyze the mask looking for the weapon. Vassilis, aware of the switch, misidentifies Chuck as head of the operation. He believes Chuck used Sarah and Hannah to gain access to the vault, and uses Hannah as bait to force him to return the real mask. He lures her to the museum and locks her in the vault, where she begins to suffocate. Vassilis contacts Chuck at the Nerd Herd desk and demands he return the mask in exchange for her life.

Back at Castle, Sarah and Shaw inadvertently trigger the weapon, which fills the lab with a chemical identified as cyclosarin and forces a lockdown to prevent further outbreak. Chuck arrives to update Shaw and Sarah only to find them trapped, and flashes on the gas's chemical composition and discovers that there is a counter agent that will reverse the effects if used within an hour. Reasoning that Vassilis would not have moved the weapon without the counter agent, he calls in Casey to assist with swapping out a second fake. To force Vassilis to give them the counter agent as well as release Hannah, they rig it with a smoke grenade to simulate the effects of the gas. At the museum, Chuck confronts Vassilis and smashes the mask and triggers the grenade. In a panic, Vassilis reveals the counter agent is in one of the vases, but does not know which. Chuck flashes on the correct vase, smashes it over Vassilis's head, and gives the counter agent to Casey while he frees Hannah from the vault. Meanwhile, Shaw and Sarah have been released from containment, and arrive at the museum where the antidote is administered. Vassilis sees Shaw and slips away.

In debriefing back at Castle, Shaw tells Chuck that he, Sarah and Casey are only his "training wheels," and one day soon he will be on his own. Vassilis meets with his superiors where he alerts them to Shaw's presence, before he is executed for his failure to recover the mask.

=== Chuck and Hannah ===
Hannah begins trying to approach Chuck at the Buy More, when he is called away to the museum by Sarah and Casey. She follows him when he calls it a "Nerd Herd emergency" and (unknowingly) helps him free Shaw from the vault. That night at the gala, Hannah approaches him directly and they begin to kiss, before Hannah sees his "ex" on the monitor. She is angered when Chuck leaves to greet her and then leaves her to deal with the crash that he secretly causes himself (see above). Chuck tries to explain afterwards but she walks out on him. Hannah is later lured back to the museum by Vassilis and trapped in the vault. She begins to suffocate as the air is pumped out and passes out. She reconciles with Chuck after he frees her, and later that night, the two make out in the Home Theater Room.

=== Sarah and Shaw ===
Shaw begins hitting on Sarah, first by bringing her coffee and a swizzle stick, noticing that she chews on them, and later at the party by making advances, ostensibly for cover. Sarah later confronts him over this and demands he back off, although Shaw denies it. Later, while under the effects of the cyclosarin, Shaw admits that he was indeed coming on to her, and Sarah admits that she somewhat enjoyed it. Sarah nearly succumbs to the gas and Shaw carries her to the museum where the counter agent is administered. Later, Chuck and Sarah agree that it is ok for them to pursue other relationships. That night at Castle, Shaw and Sarah stay behind after Chuck and Casey leave. Sarah notes that what they're doing is dangerous, but Shaw reassures her he's safe.

=== Morgan and Ellie ===
Morgan and Ellie are still disturbed over Chuck and Devon's strange behavior. Morgan admits that he overstated Jeff and Lester's stalking skills, and the two discuss how to determine what is happening themselves. Initially Morgan suggests an intervention, but chickens out when an opportunity presents itself. Morgan continues to display an interest in Hannah, and uses the events at the museum the night before as a means to approach her. However, his effort is thwarted when Hannah is lured into a trap at the museum by Vassilis. Later that night, Ellie meets him at the Buy More where they attempt to corner Chuck and force him to come clean but instead find him making out with Hannah. Ellie is satisfied that Chuck has been secretly seeing Hannah, but Morgan is crushed.

== Production ==
The title of the episode was released on October 9, 2009.

=== Production details ===
- This episode reveals that the unidentified leaders that Vincent met with in "Chuck Versus the Predator" were actually high-ranking members of The Ring, and not of Fulcrum itself.
- Cyclosarin is a real nerve agent developed for use in chemical warfare. However under the room-temperature conditions of Castle's lab, it naturally exists in a liquid state, not as a gas. The container in which it was shipped would require some specialized means of dispersing it in a gaseous state in the manner depicted in the episode. Cyclosarin also possesses a distinct, sweet odor which would have made Chuck and Casey's deception with a smoke grenade difficult.
- Series regulars Scott Krinsky, Vik Sahay, Mark Christopher Lawrence, and Ryan McPartlin do not appear in this episode.

==== The Mask of Alexander ====
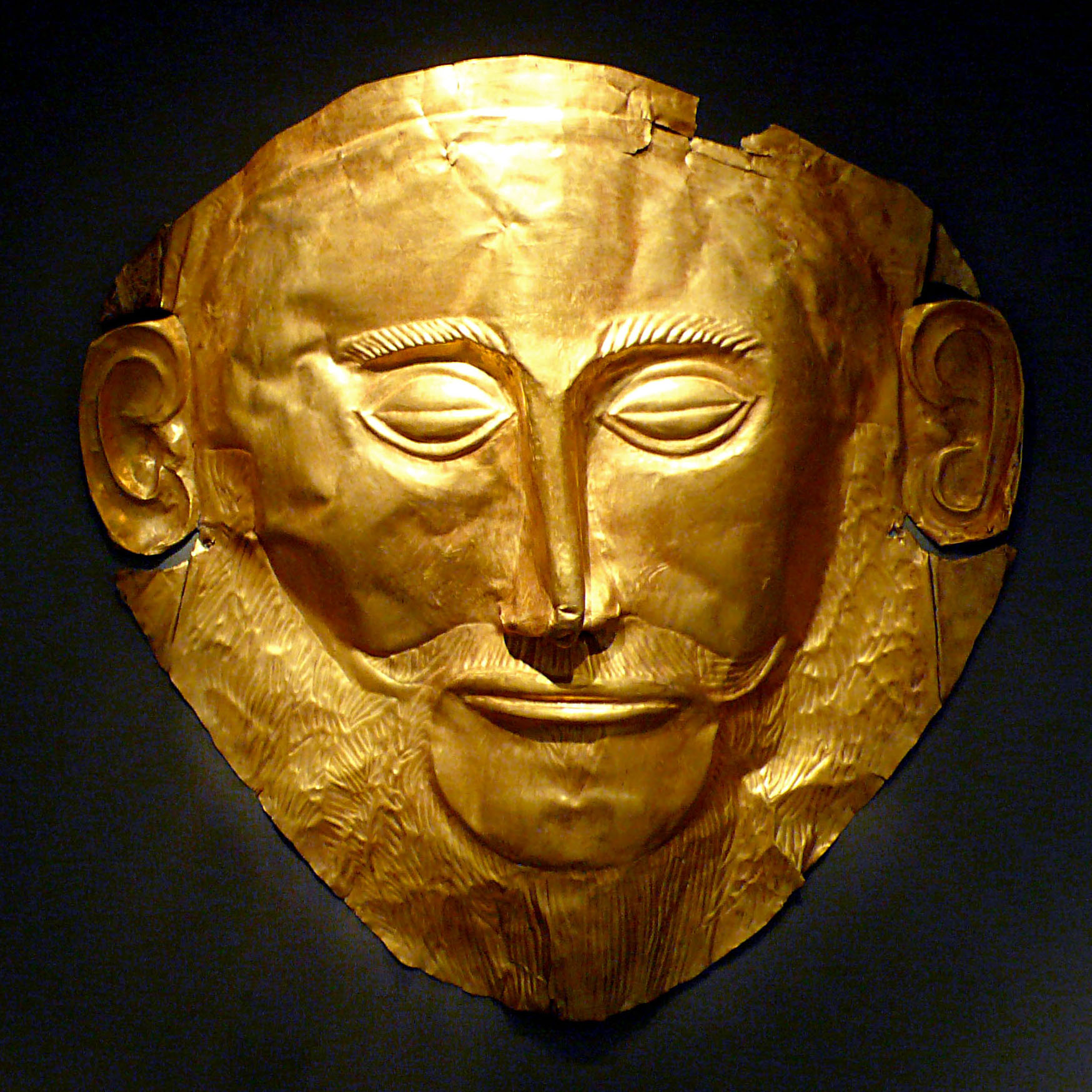
The Mask of Agamemnon

The "Mask of Alexander" which interests the Ring does not refer to a real archaeological find from Classical Antiquity; however, it does bear a resemblance to a golden mask from the 5th century BC burial mound outside the town Shipka, Bulgaria, discovered by Georgi Kitov in 2004, as well as the Agamemnon death mask discovered at Mycenae in 1876 by Heinrich Schliemann.

=== Filming locations ===
House of the Book, located on the Brandeis-Bardin Institute campus in Simi Valley, California, was used as the exterior of the museum. It was also once used as the exterior for the Command Center in Mighty Morphin Power Rangers.

=== Flashes ===
- Chuck flashes on a Ring operative named Vassilis.
- Chuck flashes on the chemical composition of the cyclosarin gas displayed on one of Castle's monitors.
- A third flash identifies to Chuck which vase contains the counter agent to the gas.

== Reaction ==
"Chuck Versus the Mask" elicited strongly mixed reactions from viewers due to the changing relationships between Chuck, Sarah, Shaw and Hannah. On February 9, 2010, Josh Schwartz and Chris Fedak directly addressed the controversy through an interview with television critic Alan Sepinwall. Schwartz and Fedak acknowledged the strong fan involvement in the show, but defended the events of the episode as an important part in the ongoing development of the main storyline and the relationships of the characters. Schwartz also noted he appreciated seeing the reaction the episode generated, citing it as a sign of viewers' investment in the show and the characters.

Linda Holmes of NPR further supported Schwartz and Fedak's position. She criticized the display by many fans of a sense of entitlement in directing the progression of the show by stating that "[t]elevision plot lines are not supposed to be determined by majority vote," and that regardless of the fan involvement that led to the series' renewal for a third season, the story is ultimately in the hands of Schwartz and Fedak. Maureen Ryan of the Chicago Tribune found some fault in several plot holes within the episode, but also supported the direction of Fedak and Schwartz, citing both the Sepinwall interview and Holmes' analysis of the fan reaction.

== References to popular culture ==
- The scene where Shaw attempts to steal the mask by entering the vault from above suspended upside-down on a cable is an homage to a similar scene involving Tom Cruise in the movie Mission: Impossible.
- Chuck describes Shaw to Hannah as "Superman-y". Actor Brandon Routh portrayed Superman in the film Superman Returns. Other Superman connection on Chuck include actors Matthew Bomer and Ryan McPartlin, both of whom auditioned for the role and lost to Routh, Kristin Kreuk, who portrayed Lana Lang on the TV series Smallville and Adam Baldwin who voiced Superman in the animated film "Superman: Doomsday". Bomer would later voice Superman in the animated film "Superman: Unbound".
- Chuck says of the vases, "One of these things is not like the other", in reference to an educational song on Sesame Street.
- The museum's exterior is the same as the original command center from Mighty Morphin Power Rangers.
