= Chuck Versus the Pink Slip =

- Chuck episode
- Episode no.: Season 3 Episode 1
- Directed by: Robert Duncan McNeill
- Written by: Chris Fedak; Matt Miller
- Production code: 3X5801
- Original air date: January 10, 2010

Guest appearances
- Bonita Friedericy as Diane Beckman; Tony Hale as Emmett Milbarge; Adoni Maropis as Javier Cruz; Christian Svensson as Frank

Episode chronology
← Previous "Chuck Versus the Ring"	Next → "Chuck Versus the Three Words"

"Chuck Versus the Pink Slip" is the third-season premiere episode of the television series Chuck. It aired on NBC on January 10, 2010 in a special two-episode block. After failing "spy school", Chuck must find his way back onto the team, and in the process repair his shattered relationship with Sarah.

== Plot ==
=== Main Plot ===
The episode begins 6 months after the Intersect 2.0 upload, with Chuck imprisoned by a gang of Russian mobsters. Chuck demands that their leader Yuri turn over a stolen briefcase (which General Beckman tells Chuck via his ear bud) is in the room. When Yuri threatens Chuck with his sidearm, Chuck flashes on kung fu. He seizes Yuri's weapon, but despite Beckman's prompting is unable to shoot him. Instead he defeats the mobsters in hand-to-hand combat and flees with the briefcase. Guided by Beckman, he heads to a rooftop, but in his excited state is unable to flash on the necessary zip-line skill to escape and is surrounded. Beckman calls an end to what is revealed as a simulation. Dissatisfied with Chuck's inability to control the Intersect after months of training, Beckman terminates his training as a spy.

Chuck returns home dejected and depressed. He's greeted at home by Ellie and Devon, and reveals that he's lost Sarah. Chuck spends his days on the couch eating cheese balls and grows unkempt. Even a visit from Morgan is unable to bring Chuck out of his depressed state. Prompted by Devon, he tries to call Sarah, but she ignores his call and throws her phone away into a pool where she's relaxing with another man. Later, he heads to the Buy More when he runs out of cheese balls, but is confronted by Emmett, who begins to berate him. Chuck begins to flash and struggles to restrain an automatic attempt to throttle Emmett. Jeff and Lester mention having seen Sarah at the Orange Orange, and Chuck uses his key to sneak in. Instead he's caught by Casey, who is in the process of cleaning out Castle. Chuck learns that he and Sarah have a mission, and when Casey refuses to let him join, he takes it on himself to clean up and go anyway.

He follows Casey to the nightclub he saw on the mission dossier and gains entry under the guise of a member of the Nerd Herd. He runs into Sarah, who to protect her cover has Chuck kiss her, then slaps him (which knocks him out) when her target sees them together. Sarah is cold to him, and she and Casey angrily tell Chuck to leave. While leaving, Casey does mention they are meeting a Ring courier named Javier Cruz, which Chuck flashes on and realizes the man is not a mere courier but an assassin. Casey and Sarah leave and have Chuck removed before he can warn them so Chuck tries to break back in anyway, and when his attempts to break down the door fails, he flashes on kung fu just as a mariachi guitarist arrives. He inadvertently kicks the man when he surprises him and knocks him out. Chuck takes advantage of the man's clothing and guitar to regain entry, but before he can find Casey, is forced on stage. Casey and Sarah see him, but Sarah tells Casey not to tranquilize him, giving him a chance to flash on the guitar and instantly learning to play. He is able to warn Casey about the assassin and begins scanning the club hoping to flash on him. Outside, the mariachi player wakes him and removes his disguise, revealing that he is the assassin, Javier. He makes his way inside and aims through the door at Sarah and her date. Chuck sees his laser sight on Sarah and jumps off stage to knock her out of the way. The assassin flees and finds Chuck's Nerd Herd badge while Chuck is hauled off for ruining the operation.

Chuck returns to the living room couch and tells Devon he's been fired by the government, and his behavior is not just a cover. Morgan arrives again and takes Chuck to the Buy More in an effort to cheer him up, by revealing his own plans have fallen apart. He failed as a Benihana chef, Anna left him for a classmate, and he now lives in the Buy More. Sarah arrives at the store to say goodbye, while he tries to explain himself. While they talk, Javier arrives in search of Chuck. Emmett confronts him by the loading dock and tells him Chuck no longer works there. As Javier turns to leave, Emmett, making a fatal mistake, insults the assassin, who turns around and shoots him in the head. His men break into the store and capture Chuck and Sarah. In Castle, Casey is supervising the last of the cleanup when he sees Emmett lying dead by the loading dock and orders a search for Chuck and Sarah.

Chuck and Sarah are locked up, and Javier confronts Chuck. Chuck is unable to flash and is beaten senseless. When he comes around again he hears Sarah in the next room over, and he laments at his failures as a spy. Sarah instead encourages him, and with her life also now in danger, Chuck is able to regain control of the Intersect. When Javier returns, he flashes and knocks him out. Chuck takes his keys and a strange device, then flees the compound with Sarah. They are pinned down on a rooftop, but he flashes and they zip line on a power line, correcting the failure from the simulation. Unfortunately they are once again surrounded. Just in time, Casey arrives in a helicopter gunship. Javier is killed during their attack and Chuck and Sarah are rescued.

Back at Castle, Beckman is forced to acknowledge that Chuck is still vital to hunting the Ring and reinstates him. Casey and Sarah are ordered to help train him. Back at home, Devon and Ellie are moving out into another apartment in the complex, leaving Chuck on his own. He and Morgan decide to move in, to Ellie's frustration. Chuck, Morgan and Casey are all reinstated at the Buy More, where Casey tells Chuck that Emmett relocated to Anchorage. The episode ends with Casey teaching Chuck boxing in Castle, Chuck flashes on how to box and confidently accepts the fight.

=== Chuck and Sarah ===
The major subplot throughout the episode is Chuck and Sarah's relationship. Sarah is cold to Chuck for most of the episode, the reason for which is gradually revealed. Immediately following their escape from the Ring (in "Chuck Versus the Ring"), Chuck was ordered to undergo special spy training in Prague. Instead, Sarah asked him to meet her at the train station there to run away with her so they could be together. Initially, Chuck happily agrees but when he meets her at the station three weeks later, Chuck tells her he can't go with her.

Showing a degree of compassion, Casey calls Chuck a "poor bastard." Casey tells Sarah that Chuck still loves her, which Sarah denies, and Casey explains that while he doesn't know what happened between them, he has seen "men having their fingernails pulled out treated more humanely than you did that kid." Sarah explains she was doing her job, and Casey retorts that her job is over, and that she should "put him out of his misery."

Chuck tries to explain his actions throughout the episode, but a heartbroken Sarah is unwilling to listen.

Their relationship gains some closure after they escape together from Javier's team. At the end of the episode, Chuck tries to explain that he has a chance at making something out of his life. Sarah stops him short, and tells him that as a real spy, he needs to control his feelings.

== Production ==
On May 17, 2009, it was announced that Chuck was picked up for a third season with an order for thirteen episodes and an option for the back nine. By July 24 a casting call was out for several prominent roles in the premiere, including the episode's primary villain, Javier, with production beginning in August.

Originally the premiere was scheduled for March on the Monday following the closing ceremonies of the 2010 Olympics, but on November 19, 2009 the premiere was moved up to January 10 in a 2-episode block followed by "Chuck Versus the Three Words," with a third episode to air in the show's normal time slot the following night.

=== Flashes ===
- A flashback was shown to Chuck's flash at the end of "Chuck Versus the Ring."
- Chuck flashed to learn kung fu during the spy training simulation.
- When being berated by Emmett in the Buy More, Chuck flashed on close-quarters combat, but forcibly restrained himself.
- Chuck flashes on the name of the Ring courier Casey and Sarah were waiting for.
- Chuck flashed on kung fu again while trying to break back into the nightclub.
- Another skill flash taught Chuck how to play the guitar while on stage.
- After encouragement from Sarah, Chuck successfully flashed on kung fu to disable Javier and help them escape.
- While escaping, Chuck flashes on how to zip-line. Chuck had unsuccessfully attempted this same flash during his training at the beginning of this episode.
- While training with Casey in boxing at the end of the episode, after some encouragement, Chuck was able to flash on boxing abilities, and begin sparring with Casey.

== Music ==
- "Black and Gold" by Sam Sparro
- "Wait It Out" by Imogen Heap
- "Just Dropped In (To See What Condition My Condition Was In)" by Kenny Rogers and The First Edition
- "Hold On" by Wilson Phillips
- "Backwards Walk" by Frightened Rabbit
- "Young Adult Friction" by The Pains Of Being Pure At Heart
- "Eye of the Tiger" by Survivor

== Reception ==
"Chuck Versus the Pink Slip" drew 7.7 million viewers, for a score of 3.0 in the 18–49 share.

== References to popular culture ==
- Chuck's thick beard and bathrobe is a nod to The Dude, portrayed by Jeff Bridges, from The Big Lebowski, while the song "Just Dropped In (To See What Condition My Condition Was In)" that plays during the scene is a further reference to the film.
- The sparring match in Castle between Chuck and Casey is a nod to the end of the film Rocky III, right down to the gold and red boxing gloves and the use of "Eye of the Tiger" and ending on a freeze frame.
- "You have much to learn, Grasshopper", said to Chuck by Casey before they begin to spar is a quote from the series "Kung Fu" with David Carradine.
- When Chuck is trying to re-enter the restaurant, he runs into the door and says “Oh, son of a… That’s going to leave a mark.” A reference to Chris Farley’s character in Tommy Boy.
