= Chuck Versus the Other Guy =

- Chuck episode
- Episode no.: Season 3 Episode 13
- Directed by: Peter Lauer
- Written by: Chris Fedak
- Production code: 3X5813
- Original air date: April 5, 2010

Guest appearances
- Bonita Friedericy as Diane Beckman; Brandon Routh as Daniel Shaw; Mark Sheppard as The Director

Episode chronology
← Previous "Chuck Versus the American Hero"	Next → "Chuck Versus the Honeymooners"

"Chuck Versus the Other Guy" is the thirteenth episode of Chuck's third season, and originally aired on April 5, 2010. Sarah and Shaw are ordered to track down the Director by Beckman, but Chuck has misgivings over whether Shaw can be trusted after the revelation that Sarah killed his wife.

== Plot summary ==
As the episode opens, Shaw has taken Sarah to a warehouse where he claims the Director has been tracked. Shaw reveals to her that the woman she killed was his wife, Evelyn. He tells the stunned Sarah that he knows she wasn't to blame and that she was set up by her superiors to make the kill.

Back at Castle, Beckman benches Chuck and orders Sarah and Shaw to Washington to head up the search for the Director. Shaw finds the director, and Sarah chooses Chuck to help them apprehend him. Chuck and Sarah confront the Director, who reveals that the Ring has developed its own prototype of the Intersect Cipher. After they leave the facility, it is revealed that Shaw has joined the Ring.

The team debriefs at Castle, and Beckman this time reprimands Shaw for apparently killing the Director, but Chuck comes to his defense for saving their lives. Beckman reveals that the Ring's Cipher is flawed, and based on the components, was manufactured in Paris. Beckman orders Shaw and Sarah to follow-up. Morgan realizes something is off when he and Chuck review the security camera footage of Shaw fending off Ring agents, and notice that the fighting was staged.

Meanwhile, Shaw takes Sarah to the street where Evelyn was killed and Sarah realizes he has been turned by the Ring. She is then poisoned by a paralytic agent. Chuck and Casey arrive, and while Casey deals with the Director, Chuck confronts Shaw and the two get into a fight. Chuck shoots Shaw in the chest, and he topples over the bridge to his death. Casey is reinstated for his capturing the Director, and Morgan becomes an official member of Operation Bartowski.

== Reception ==
"Chuck Versus the Other Guy" has received universally positive reviews. IGN rated the episode a 9.5/10, equalling Chuck's series high, along with "Chuck Versus the Beard," "Chuck Versus the Colonel" and "Chuck Versus Santa Claus." The LA Times described the episode as "45 minutes of deeply entertaining television," though also cited the missteps of the season leading up to it. IF.com praised the inclusion of Morgan in the spy game to take over Chuck's role as the bumbling non-spy on the team. The AV Club also thought very highly of this episode and gave it a rating of A.
