= Chuck Versus the Fake Name =

- Chuck episode
- Episode no.: Season 3 Episode 8
- Directed by: Jeremiah S. Chechik
- Written by: Allison Adler
- Production code: 3X5808
- Original air date: March 1, 2010

Guest appearances
- Brandon Routh as Daniel Shaw; Kristin Kreuk as Hannah; Louis Lombardi as Scotty; Tony Sirico as Matty; Johnny Messner as Rafe Gruber

Episode chronology
← Previous "Chuck Versus the Mask"	Next → "Chuck Versus the Beard"

"Chuck Versus the Fake Name" is a third-season episode of the television series Chuck. It was the eighth episode of the season, and the first to air after a two-week hiatus for the 2010 Winter Olympics. Chuck must juggle his new relationship with Hannah while at the same time taking on the role of an assassin hired by the Ring.

== Plot summary ==
Sarah, Shaw and Casey apprehend a deadly and elusive assassin named Rafe Gruber. When Chuck arrives at Castle after their operation, he is informed he will be taking Gruber's place in a meeting with the contacts who have Gruber's target. After briefly studying his mannerisms, Chuck and Casey rendezvous with the contacts at a bar, two mobsters named Matty and Scotty, while Sarah and Shaw monitor from the van, and he successfully passes himself off as the assassin. Gruber is taken into custody and Chuck returns home for dinner with Ellie, Devon and Hannah.

The next morning at the Buy More, Hannah mistakenly answers a call from the mobsters for Chuck, who say they will be at the store shortly. Chuck meets them at the loading dock, where they take him to an apartment high-rise where he can gain access to his target. Chuck is stunned to learn that his target is Shaw, and that Sarah is with him.

Chuck inadvertently reveals his feelings for Sarah to Matty and Scotty, and takes advantage of their sympathies as an opportunity to "confront" his rival face-to-face, and warn Shaw that he is the Ring's target. Chuck punches Shaw and the two get into a fight to play up to the mobsters. Meanwhile, Gruber escapes custody and tracks Chuck's whereabouts. He disables Chuck, Sarah, and Shaw and, realizing that Chuck and Shaw both have feelings for her, takes Sarah hostage. Before he can kill her, Casey kills him with the sniper rifle.

With the missions leaving him little time for Hannah, and his love for Sarah being greater, Chuck breaks up with Hannah. Heartbroken, Hannah quits the Buy More.

== Production ==
"Chuck Versus the Fake Name" first aired on March 1, 2010. It aired following significant controversy among the viewers over its preceding episode, "Chuck Versus the Mask", which was exacerbated by the Olympic break. "Chuck Versus the Mask" was not originally intended to serve as a mid-season cliffhanger, but was the result of the season premier being moved up to January 10.

== Reception ==
"Chuck Versus the Fake Name" pulled in 6.7 million viewers for a 2.4 demo.

Reviews of the episode have mostly been positive. Alan Sepinwall of the Star-Ledger found the episode one of the season's best. He cited the balance of humor and darker edge the season has been taken, along with the manner in which Levi performed Chuck's assuming of Gruber's personality, commenting that "the joke was written, directed (by Jeremiah Chechik), and played by Levi on just the right level: funny to those of us who know how un-Chuck-like the role is, but just believable enough to the likes of Paulie Walnuts." He also praised the way the arc beginning in "Chuck Versus the Nacho Sampler" portrayed Chuck's growing uncertainty of who he has become, and the way in which it sparked Sarah's own introspection on who she really is. However he acknowledged that the meta-humor of characters within the episode noting their dislike of "will they/won't they" angst is a sign that such a plot has run its course.

However, some reviews were less enthusiastic. Maureen Ryan of the Chicago Tribune noted that although the premise of the season is intriguing, the execution has often fallen short, including both this episode and "Chuck Versus the Mask". She praised Yvonne Strahovski's performance and the character arc Sarah has been following as the season progressed, but found the Sarah/Shaw relationship unbelievable and also found fault in the ending of Chuck's relationship with Hannah. Elements such as the "real name" scene were awkward, Johnny Messner's performance was wooden, and the gangsters portrayed by Sirico and Lombardi were not funny. Ryan also noted the Buy More subplot felt tacked on.

IGN rated the episode an 8.8/10.
