= Chuck Versus the Broken Heart =

- Chuck episode
- Captain Awesome's bachelor party in "Chuck Versus the Broken Heart"
- Episode no.: Season 2 Episode 18
- Directed by: Kevin Bray
- Written by: Allison Adler
- Production code: 3T7267
- Original air date: March 30, 2009

Guest appearances
- Bonita Friedericy as Diane Beckman; Tricia Helfer as Alex Forrest; Shaun Toub as Mohammed Zamir

Episode chronology
← Previous "Chuck Versus the Predator"	Next → "Chuck Versus the Dream Job"

"Chuck Versus the Broken Heart" is the 18th episode of Chuck's second season, and the 31st episode overall. It aired on NBC on March 30, 2009. Tricia Helfer guest stars as agent Alex Forrest, assigned to evaluate Sarah's performance due to General Beckman's concerns about her relationship with Chuck. Meanwhile, Morgan, Jeff and Lester try to get themselves invited to Captain Awesome's bachelor party.

== Plot summary ==
=== Main Plot ===
The episode begins with Chuck returning to his apartment. He's ambushed before he can get in the door by three masked figures, but Casey interrupts them before they can take him anywhere and forces them to unmask. It's Morgan, Jeff and Lester, who are rehearsing kidnapping Devon for his bachelor party, and Chuck reminds them they're not invited. Casey chases them off with a blast from a hose, while Chuck goes home. He's looking over the Intersect information Orion provided him before his death when General Beckman contacts him through his computer. She confronts Chuck on the nature of his and Sarah's relationship, but when Chuck tries to tell her they're strictly professional, she shows him surveillance footage of him confessing how he feels to Sarah, including the gift of his mother's charm bracelet. Beckman advises him she's instituting a "49B."

The next morning Chuck goes to the Orange Orange to advise Sarah of what happened but is surprised to find another woman working the counter instead. In a briefing with Beckman in Castle, Sarah tells Chuck that the new agent, Alexandra Forrest, has been assigned to evaluate her performance and will be temporarily taking over her role as Chuck's CIA handler. The team is assigned to investigate a suspected Afghan terrorist, Rashad Ahmad, receiving heart surgery in the U.S., as he is a link to their leader Hassan Khalid's whereabouts in the cavernous region on the border of Afghanistan and Pakistan. However, the hospital is also where Chuck's sister and Devon work. Chuck is told that Ellie is off that day, and Devon is doing a surgery. Against Chuck's objections, the team moves in.

Sarah remains in the van, while Chuck, Forrest and Casey infiltrate as staff. Chuck narrowly avoids his sister by ducking into a patient room with Forrest, where he flashes on two men: the patient Rashad Ahmad, who is going by the pseudonym Harry Lime, and his personal physician Dr. Muhammed Zamir, confirming their intelligence report. While Chuck delays them, Casey attempts but fails to break into the hospital's donor bank, where he intends to plant a GLG-4000 bug in the pacemaker that will be implanted into Ahmad, which they can use to track him even in the mountainous regions of Afghanistan. Forrest suggests stealing the ID badge of one of the doctors, and she settles on Devon despite Chuck's objections. Unable to dissuade them, he does manage to persuade them to lift his ID at Devon's bachelor party (see below). Forrest disguises herself as a stripper with a police officer routine at the party and takes Devon into the Buy More Home Theater room. However, he refuses to participate, so she decides to tranquilize him and steal his ID. With it, they successfully plant the bug.

After a debriefing by Beckman, Forrest tells her that Sarah's performance is compromised by her personal feelings for Chuck. Sarah is recalled to Langley, and Forrest is permanently reassigned to take her place. Sarah is upset, but accepts the General's decision. She nonetheless takes advantage of her government clearance to help Chuck's failed search for his father by secretly and illegally searching the CIA database for his location as a parting gift for him. She then packs up her belongings for the trip back to the East Coast. Meanwhile, Zamir discovers a bug planted during Ahmad's surgery and targets Devon as the surgeon who implanted the device. Chuck sees Zamir's team arrive and takes Devon's place when they come to apprehend him.

While Sarah is on the road, her search of Stephen Bartowski concludes, and she decides to return immediately to Burbank to tell Chuck what she has found. She arrives after Chuck has been abducted and is about to leave him a note when she sees his phone lying on his bed. Sarah immediately returns to Castle but her access has been revoked. She signals Casey and warns him that Chuck is missing. Forrest attempts to overrule her because his watch's GPS transponder places him in his apartment's courtyard. Sarah activates their surveillance cameras: his watch is at the bottom of the fountain. The three track them to a bank vault, which Zamir is using to shield the bug while forcing Chuck (whom he believes is Devon) to operate and remove it. Chuck tries to stall, but his identity is revealed and Zamir tries to kill him, knocking over a tank of nitrous which Casey sees as they arrive at the vault shortly before Zamir seals the door. Forrest wants to blow the vault open, but the blast could ignite the nitrous, killing Chuck. Sarah works on cracking the lock while the others try to get Chuck to open the door. Chuck and Zamir get high on the gas, and in their inebriated state Chuck gets Zamir to confess where the terrorists are located. Sarah succeeds in opening the vault and rescues Chuck.

Later in a debriefing, Beckman reluctantly admits that Chuck and Sarah's feelings for each other make them more effective together, rather than acting as a liability. Forrest is recalled, and Sarah is reinstated as Chuck's CIA handler.

=== Buy More ===
Throughout the episode, Morgan, Jeff and Lester try to get themselves invited to Awesome's bachelor party. Chuck continues to refuse until the team needs to steal Devon's hospital ID. His idea is to use the bachelor party to get Devon drunk until he passes out so they can steal his hospital key card. Four of them kidnap him as he leaves the hospital and bring him to the Buy More where they surprise him with the party. Throughout the evening Jeff and Lester are taking pictures, as it's their first time at a bachelor party. Jeff has also arranged for strippers, one of whom is his sister. Agent Forrest arrives later disguised as a dancer herself and performs a strip tease for Awesome, handcuffing him and taking him to the Home Theater Room where she attempts to seduce him. Devon refuses her advances, and she tranquilizes him instead and steals his ID.

=== Family ===
After Chuck's conversation with Beckman at the beginning of the episode, Devon wakes up Chuck with a health shake, which he refuses. He sees a note on Chuck's computer screen remarking that his conference with Beckman has ended, and Chuck attempts to cover it with being part of a video game with Morgan. When pressed by Devon who Chuck is, if Morgan is "Beckman," Chuck answers "Carmichael." This triggers a conference with Beckman when Awesome turns his back, which Chuck promptly turns off before he can see it. Devon later inadvertently triggers the briefing himself when he jokingly uses the name "Carmichael," but doesn't see Beckman before she shuts it down.

Later, at the bachelor party, Devon is tranq'ed by Forrest. Under the influence of the tranquilizer, he briefly hears Chuck yelling at her about it before passing out. The next morning he wakes up at home to find his badge missing and unable to remember what happened. Ellie becomes suspicious and goes to the Buy More to ask Morgan what happened. He tries to protect Devon by not answering. When she turns to leave, she sees Jeff and Lester looking over their pictures of the party, which include Forrest with Devon. They try to stop Ellie as she leaves, but she is convinced Devon cheated. She confronts Chuck when he tries to return his ID badge and is angry because it looks like Chuck is covering for him, too.

After the mission, Chuck comes to see Sarah at her apartment to vent about the situation. He's upset because Beckman's orders continue to interfere with and hurt his family. To help make it up to him, Sarah reveals she's learned where Chuck's father is hiding and takes him out to a trailer 100 miles outside Barstow, California. Chuck knocks on the door but at first there's no answer. He remarks that his father didn't want to be found, when the trailer door opens. The episode ends with Chuck saying "Dad?"

== Production ==
On November 21, 2008 Tricia Helfer was announced to be appearing as a CIA agent assigned by General Beckman to take over as Chuck's CIA handler due to Beckman's concerns over the developing relationship between Sarah and Chuck. The episode follows directly on the end of "Chuck Versus the Predator," in which Beckman questions Casey on the relationship between Sarah and Chuck.

Helfer greatly enjoyed her time on the show, complimenting the series' and cast's sense of humor. Strahovski also noted that part of the fun of the episode was the differences between Helfer's Agent Forrest and Sarah Walker, particularly that part of Sarah's effectiveness in working with Chuck is by using her emotions. Comparisons were also made between Forrest and John Casey.

This episode reveals that the name of the hospital where Devon and Ellie work is Westside Hospital. Jeff's sister is also revealed to be a stripper.

"Chuck Versus the Broken Heart" also effectively ends Chuck's search for his father, begun in "Chuck Versus the Sensei." Scott Bakula appeared as Stephen Bartowski beginning with the next episode, "Chuck Versus the Dream Job" as part of a three-part story arc alongside Chevy Chase.

Ryan McPartlin has said in interviews that Devon will be becoming more involved with the series as it moves towards the finale, and will be growing suspicious of Chuck's double life. This episode is an advancement of this, as he sees references to General Beckman on Chuck's computer and later overhears Chuck scolding Agent Forrest after she tranquilizes him before he passes out.

=== Flashes ===
- Chuck flashes on Agent Forrest when he sees her in the Orange Orange.
- Chuck confirms Zamir's and Ahmad's identities.

== References to popular culture ==
- Chuck's "Doctor" conversation with Zamir is a reference to the film Spies Like Us.
- Chuck's attempt to start cutting open the patient (in the wrong place) is also a reference to Spies Like Us.
- When Chuck tells Casey that Agent Forrest's addition to their team was like Sarah was replaced by a soulless robot, this is a reference to Tricia Helfer's famous role as a Number Six, a Cylon on Battlestar Galactica.
- The patient's pseudonym "Harry Lime" is a reference to the film and novel The Third Man.
- One of the names that scrolls by as Sarah begins her search for Chuck's father is that of the director, Robert Duncan McNeill.
- The name of Helfer's character, Alexandra Forrest, is the same as that of Glenn Close's character in the film Fatal Attraction.
- The terrorist Chuck is sent to investigate in the hospital is named Rashad Ahmad, a reversal of the name of sportscaster and former NFL player Ahmad Rashad.
- Devon telling Ellie "How could I be tempted by a hamburger when I have steak at home?" is an homage to the famous quip by Paul Newman to his wife Joanne Woodward.
