= The Ring (Chuck) =

The Ring is a major spy organization in the television series Chuck. The main antagonist of the second season (after being introduced in the first), Fulcrum, is revealed in the Season Two finale to be part of the Ring, making him the main antagonist of Season Three. The Ring's goals are not known, but they're clearly in conflict with the legitimate American intelligence community due their attempts to manipulate politics in several countries to accomplish its ends.

== Organization ==
Little information about the Ring has been revealed so far. In "Chuck Versus the Ring," Bryce Larkin reveals that FULCRUM was only one part of the Ring, however, he died from a fatal gunshot wound before he could say anything further about what he knew. Unlike FULCRUM, which is primarily made up of rogue agents of the CIA, the Ring has operatives outside the intelligence community.

How much the government knows about the organization is also unknown. Bryce Larkin was familiar with their existence, and Daniel Shaw has been tracking them for at least five years by the time he takes over command of Team Bartowski. In "Chuck Versus Operation Awesome" he reveals that the Ring is primarily cell-based and consists of a large number of small and decentralized groups. Ring cells operate with a high degree of autonomy, and an agent who misidentified Devon as a spy would not have reported to her superiors until it was confirmed they had him "turned."

All Ring agents are issued distinctive, circular smartphones. These phones work off a closed network that was impossible to crack until Team Bartowski captured one. Also, nearly all Ring agents carry FN Five-seven pistols.

== The Director ==
The Director
- Chuck character
- First appearance: "Chuck Versus the American Hero"
- Last appearance: "Chuck Versus the Other Guy"
- Portrayed by: Mark Sheppard

In-universe information
- Gender: Male
- Occupation: Director
- Affiliation: The Ring

The Director is the head of the Ring. He first appeared in the third season episode "Chuck Versus the American Hero," where he was revealed to be the driving force behind the Ring itself. He is portrayed by actor Mark Sheppard.

=== Biography ===
Nothing has been revealed about the Director's identity, and even his real name is unknown. Although his nationality has also not been identified, he does speak with an English accent, reflecting the international nature of the Ring.

=== Series ===
The Director was first mentioned by his subordinates in "Chuck Versus the American Hero," when he sent them to apprehend Shaw and bring him in, but this plan was inadvertently thwarted by Morgan, Casey and Devon. Believing he had an opportunity to take out the Director and a substantial part of the Ring's senior leadership, Shaw contacted him and agreed to come in as a Trojan Horse, intending to use himself as a walking targeting beacon for an air strike. The Director confronted Shaw in an underground facility, where he played him a surveillance video recovered from the corpse of CIA turncoat and Ring informant Hunter Perry to "educate him" about his slain wife, Evelyn. The video revealed that Evelyn Shaw was not killed by a Ring agent as Shaw believed, but by Sarah. Shaw attempted to attack the director, but his adversary revealed he was never actually in the room and Shaw was instead interacting with a sophisticated hologram. The Director therefore escaped the destruction of the facility when it was bombed shortly afterwards.

In "Chuck Versus the Other Guy," the Director is involved in a complex plot to turn Shaw to the Ring. He convinced Shaw that the government believed Eve had already been turned, and utilized Sarah to execute her before Evelyn proved she was a liability. The Director allowed Shaw to strengthen his position with the government by allowing him to capture the Ring's prototype for the Cipher and "eliminate" him. Shaw then met him in Paris where he turned over the Cipher and all government technical data on the Intersect. While Shaw was dealt with by Chuck, the Director attempted to escape with the Intersect data, but he was intercepted and apprehended by Casey.

=== Development ===
Actor Mark Sheppard's casting was first indicated on December 10, 2009, and later confirmed by Maureen Ryan of the Chicago Tribune. More details emerged in an interview with ifmagazine.com, in which Sheppard confirmed he will be playing the Director of the Ring.

Few other details of the character, or the nature of his position within the Ring, have been revealed however in his IF Magazine interview, Sheppard identifies the Director with Blofeld and notes that he will figure heavily into Casey's story arc. He further suggests that the Director may become a recurring role in the series.

==== Personality ====
As with his origins, the series has so far revealed very little of the Director's personality, however the Director has proven cautious and calculating. In "Chuck Versus the American Hero," he confronted Shaw using a sophisticated hologram rather than expose himself directly to danger, commenting with disbelief that Shaw thought he could meet him face to face.

The Director is also extremely manipulative. He revealed Evelyn Shaw was actually killed by the CIA to turn Shaw to the Ring and claimed the CIA as suspect. Eve herself had been turned and ordered the hit to secure Shaw's loyalty. In "Chuck Versus the Other Guy," he conspires to gain access to the technical data on the Intersect to complete the Ring's system by taking advantage of Shaw's single-minded desire to avenge his wife's death, and orchestrates a complex series of operations to achieve these objectives.

== Ring Elders ==
Ring Elders
- Chuck character
- First appearance: "Chuck Versus the Predator"
- Last appearance: "Chuck Versus the Ring: Part II"

In-universe information
- Gender: Three male, two female
- Occupation: Leadership
- Affiliation: The Ring

In "Chuck Versus the Predator," Fulcrum agent Vincent reports to a panel of five superiors whose faces are hidden in shadow. They give him permission to further investigate the Burbank Buy More to further his search for Orion. In "Chuck Versus the Mask" it is revealed that this panel is actually senior leadership of the Ring, when Vassily reports Daniel Shaw's involvement in the interception of a chemical weapon. The council has Vassilis summarily executed when he presses them on how they wish to deal with Shaw. In "Chuck Versus the Ring: Part II", the Ring Council is formally introduced as the Five Elders, who planned to take over the NSA and CIA. However, they were all captured by Team Bartowski. First seen in: Chuck Versus the Predator.

=== Motives ===
The motives of the Ring are currently unknown. Much like FULCRUM, they did attempt to gain control of the Intersect until it was destroyed by Chuck Bartowski. They hired arms dealer Karl Stromberg to obtain and move an intelligence safe for them, and also attempted to assassinate Premier Allejandro Goya to prevent him from opening his country to democratic elections. Unlike FULCRUM, who saw themselves as patriots attempting to protect the United States' dominance in the world, their assassination attempt against Goya indicates the Ring has wider global interests.

"Chuck Versus the Nacho Sampler" has confirmed that the Ring has a continuing interest in obtaining the Intersect. They stole burned-out components of Intersect 2.0 from a government holding facility after Chuck destroyed it, and hired a computer expert to attempt reconstruction of the device. "Chuck Versus the Other Guy" revealed that the Ring had succeeded in producing their own prototype of the Cipher, the central component of the Intersect, although Shaw noted significant flaws in the device. Shaw later provided the Ring detailed technical information so they could refine their prototype, however this was intercepted by Casey, and it is unknown how much data they managed to recover.

After their defeat in Paris the Ring briefly laid low. In "Chuck Versus the Role Models" the organization resurfaced again when one of their operatives poisoned Devon in such a way as to mimic the symptoms of malaria in order to remove him and Ellie from Africa. "Chuck Versus the Tooth" begins to bring their plans for Ellie into sharper focus, when Ellie is manipulated into becoming an asset for the organization under the belief that her father was in danger. "Chuck Versus the Living Dead" reveals the Ring is after Stephen to capture a device he has developed called the Governor, which controls the electrical impulses the Intersect generates during a flash and poses a threat to the brain of an Intersect host.

Although the exact and final goals of the Ring were never clearly defined, in "Chuck Versus the Subway" and "Chuck Versus the Ring: Part II" they attempted to seize control of the CIA and NSA during a coup, first by discrediting Team Bartowski and General Beckman, then by using Shaw to arrange the replacement of multiple senior members of both organizations with the Elders. The plot was ultimately foiled by the team, and both Shaw and the Elders were apprehended.

=== Affiliated Organizations ===
The Ring is a larger organization composed of many other groups, in addition to its own cells.

==== FULCRUM ====
FULCRUM was the main antagonist of the series for parts of Season One and the entirety of Season Two. They are a CIA splinter group seeking to maintain America's place in the world, although their exact goals were never specified beyond this and acquisition of the Intersect. FULCRUM's status at the end of season two was not clearly revealed.

==== McTiernan Industries ====
In "Chuck Versus the Subway", Chuck flashes on a control panel outside the Ring base, identifying the manufacturer, McTiernan Industries, as a subsidiary of the Ring.

== Development ==
The Ring was first introduced in passing in the season two finale, "Chuck Versus the Ring." The episode revealed no further information about the organization, other than that FULCRUM is only one part of it. "Chuck Versus the Tic Tac" would later push back the Ring's direct involvement in the events of the series to as early as "Chuck Versus the Sensei". According to Chris Fedak, the Ring has a specific goal so far revealed only as different from the goals of Fulcrum.

== List of Known Agents ==
=== Jack Artman ===
Jack Artman (Andrew Connolly) is a poisoner sent by the Ring to assassinate Premier Allejandro Goya when the latter attempted to open up free democratic elections in his country, because the Ring desired to preserve his country's current situation. His first attempt was foiled by Devon Woodcomb, who successfully treated Goya's heart failure. A second attempt also failed when Devon mistook Casey—who had spotted Artman and was moving in—for the assassin. He made a third attempt on Goya with a poisoned cigar, which Devon again managed to thwart (using Casey's knowledge of Goya's blood type as well as Casey's blood). Artman expressed a familiarity with Casey and attempted to kill him, but Casey managed to defeat him and escape. Artman escaped as well, and kidnapped Devon at the hospital where he worked. Chuck's flash on Artman indicates that he was born in Connecticut, his specialty is chemical engineering, and he was involved in the highly publicized poisoning of ex-KGB colonel and Russian dissident Alexander Litvinenko in London. First seen in: Chuck Versus the Angel de la Muerte.

=== Ty Bennett ===
Ty Bennett (Carl Lumbly), born April 11, 1963, at Camp Foster Marine Base, is a karate and Kung Fu expert who was previously a combat trainer with the NSA, serving as the sensei for John Casey. When he first appears in present day, he is working as a global arms dealer and steals an inertial guidance system from the Global Launch Agency. Bennett attempts to recruit Casey, but Casey rejects the offer with disdain. Following a protracted abduction and hand-to-hand battle, Casey becomes the first known agent to force Bennett to "tap out," contributing to Bennett's apprehension. Bennett is also known to crush cans with his bare fingers. "Chuck Versus the Tic Tac" later reveals that Bennett was not working independently after all, but had in fact been turned to the Ring by Col. James Keller. First seen in: Chuck Versus the Sensei.

=== Julius Burrow ===
Julius Burrow (Bob McCracken) was the Ring operative in charge of handling Manoosh Depak while the engineer was working on rebuilding the Intersect. When Manoosh attempted to cheat the Ring, he tracked him to Weap-Con in Dubai and demanded he turn over the prototype after capturing him and Team Bartowski. First seen in: Chuck Versus the Nacho Sampler.

=== Javier Cruz ===
Javier Cruz (Adoni Maropis) was a Ring assassin. He was sent to kill someone at a nightclub where Casey and Sarah were running a sting operation believing him to be a courier, before Chuck inadvertently blew the operation when he thought Sarah was being targeted. Javier escaped but tracked Chuck to the Buy More, where he murdered Emmett and captured Chuck and Sarah. He was gunned down in a firefight by Casey during his rescue of his teammates. First seen in: Chuck Versus the Pink Slip.

=== Del and Neil ===
Del (Diedrich Bader) and Neil (Cedric Yarbrough) were two Ring operatives who infiltrated the Buy More in an effort to locate and destroy Castle, acting on the Council's intelligence that identified the store as a CIA substation. They entered the store posing as corporate executives of Cost-Less who were interested in buying the store, and began interviewing the employees while the rest of their team searched for the entrance to Castle. Del successfully identified Chuck as Agent Carmichael and located the facility. However, before his team could destroy the government's data on the Ring and eliminate Chuck and Morgan, Chuck flashed and defeated the Ring operatives with Morgan's assistance. First seen in: Chuck Versus the Beard.

=== James Keller ===
Col. James Keller (Robert Patrick) was a former US military black ops officer who recruited John Casey—then known as Alex Coburn—into the NSA in 1989 while operating in Honduras. The full extent of Keller's activities during the time from his recruitment of Casey and when he re-emerged in the present day are unknown, however at some point Keller joined the Ring and turned former NSA combat instructor Ty Bennett as well. A flash by Chuck suggests that Keller had been dishonorably discharged. He contacted Casey following a failed attempt by the Ring to seize Castle and blackmailed him into stealing a top-secret government emotion-suppressing and performance-enhancing drug called Laudanol. Keller threatened to murder Casey's ex-fiancée if he refused to obey. However the plot was foiled by the team, and Keller was killed when Casey snapped his neck. First seen in: Chuck Versus the Tic Tac.

=== Miles ===
Miles (Tug Coker) was a member of Casey's old special ops unit. Miles murders an imprisoned Ted Roark and his own comrades on Casey's team after Ellie and Devon's second wedding. He spares Casey's life because his commander once saved his. Miles was revealed as an agent of "the Ring," an organization of which FULCRUM was only one part. He attempted to steal the rebuilt Intersect, but was foiled by Chuck, who uploaded the computer into his own brain again before destroying the system. Miles attempted to retaliate by killing Chuck, but was defeated when it was revealed the Intersect gave Chuck advanced martial arts skills. First seen in: Chuck Versus the Ring.

=== Hugo Panzer ===
Hugo Panzer ("Stone Cold" Steve Austin) is one of two Ring agents transporting the key to the Ring Intelligence Safe on a flight from Los Angeles to Paris. He is an expert at close-range combat and uses a short sword that he keeps in his checked luggage. After being rendered unconscious three times during the flight, he is apprehended upon arrival in France.

Steve Austin reprises his role in the fourth season episode, "Chuck Versus the Cubic Z." He is rendered into the team's custody when a prison transport on which he is being moved breaks down and is diverted instead to Castle. He escapes after fabricating a weapon from a newspaper innocently given to him by one of the guards and reveals that he was contracted by Volkoff to kill Heather Chandler, who was being transferred with him, in retaliation for her failed attempt to acquire her husband's plans for the modified F-22 Raptor. After chasing the team and Heather through the store he is briefly recaptured by Casey, only to escape again. He is finally subdued when Big Mike stuns him with a cattle prod while fleeing through the Buy More.

Although Panzer is a very large and formidable man, he displays a great degree of intelligence. He was able to successfully hack into Castle's computer systems both to prevent Casey from gaining access to the facility, and to override the door security in the holding cells in an attempt to kill Heather. Panzer is also the first member of a previous season's main antagonist organization to return after that organization's defeat. His escape in Castle was scored with a reprise of the Ring's droning theme music from Season 3. First seen in: Chuck Versus First Class

=== Sydney Prince ===
Sydney Prince (Angie Harmon) was a Ring operative who headed a cell in Los Angeles. She tried to recruit Devon Woodcomb after mistaking him for a spy, but was shot by Daniel Shaw after being cornered by the team. However, in "Chuck Versus the Ring, Part II", an Intersect flash show that Sydney was in fact captured. Two members of her team, Glenn and Ian, are referred to by name. First seen in: Chuck Versus Operation Awesome.

=== Serena ===
Serena (Josie Davis) is one of two Ring agents transporting the key to the Ring Intelligence Safe on a flight from Los Angeles to Paris. She was placed aboard the flight in the guise of a flight attendant to support Panzer during his mission. Serena freed Panzer after he was disabled in the cargo hold, and poisoned Chuck to force him to return the key. She was later incapacitated by falling luggage after Sarah took control of the aircraft via satellite and destabilized it, and was apprehended when the flight arrived in France. Shaw expressed a familiarity with Serena's tactics, and implicated her in several poisonings of high-ranking officials. First seen in: Chuck Versus First Class.

=== Daniel Shaw ===
Daniel Shaw (Brandon Routh) was a CIA operative and expert on the Ring assigned by General Beckman to lead Operation Bartowski in their efforts to destroy the organization. His wife was killed five years prior to his joining the team while investigating the Ring, and he believed that the Ring was responsible for her murder. He learned in "Chuck Versus the American Hero" his wife was actually killed by Sarah during her red test, and the Director reveals in "Chuck Versus the Other Guy" her death was ordered by Langston Graham after the CIA uncovered information suggesting Evelyn had been turned by the Ring, although the Director never himself states that Eve had turned. Shaw subsequently turned himself and joined the Ring, but soon after was shot and presumably killed by Chuck to prevent Shaw from killing Sarah in revenge for his wife's death. However, in Chuck Versus the Tooth and Chuck Versus the Living Dead, it is revealed that Shaw is still alive, and has downloaded the Ring's new Intersect. He is presumably the person behind Justin Sullivan's plot to use Ellie for luring Steven Bartowski out of hiding. First seen in: Chuck Versus Operation Awesome. After the Director's arrest Shaw continues working for The Ring, and in the season three finale, Chuck Versus the Ring: Part II, he kills Steven. He remains the last men left of The Ring after his arrest and in season five he blackmails his way out to get revenge.

=== Justin Sullivan ===
Justin Sullivan (Scott Holroyd) is a security coordinator who operated in Africa for Doctors Without Borders. He met Devon and Ellie after their arrival, punctuated by killing a venomous snake approaching the couple while having dinner. Later, while Ellie expressed her frustration at her difficulties adjusting to working under such conditions, Justin encouraged her over the work they were doing. He further assisted them with making an emergency evacuation when Devon was stricken with malaria. However, as they departed, Justin made a call on a Ring communicator announcing that the couple were out of the way and that Devon's symptoms were artificially engineered.

Justin follows Ellie back to Burbank in "Chuck Versus the Tooth" and poses as a CIA operative to gain Ellie's confidence and recruit her as an asset. He claims that Casey is a double-agent who poses a significant threat to her father, and manipulates her into revealing Stephen left a means for his children to contact him when he left after her wedding. Justin uses Ellie in an attempt to capture Stephen and steal the Governor, which regulates the electrical impulses of an Intersect flash and helps protect the host from harmful side-effects and brain damage. He was captured, along with the Ring Elders, when they attempted to leave the Joint Security Summit, in "Chuck Versus the Ring: Part II". Justin has the most appearances in the series among villains, not counting Daniel Shaw, who entered the series as a member of Operation Bartowski. First seen in: Chuck Versus the Role Models.

=== Nicos Vassilis ===
Nicos Vassilis (Henri Lubatti) was an agent of the Ring charged with smuggling a chemical weapon in via a golden mask of Alexander the Great. At some point in the past his face was burned by Shaw, leaving him with a scar. When Chuck and Sarah successfully swapped out the mask, Vassilis mistook Chuck for the agent in charge, believing he used Sarah and Hannah to gain access to the vault. He attempted to use Hannah to force Chuck to return the mask, but was duped with a duplicate, which Chuck smashed to make him believe the weapon was released. As he fled the scene, he saw Shaw with Sarah, and reported his presence to his superiors. Vassilis was executed for his failure. First seen in: Chuck Versus the Mask.
