= Devon Woodcomb =

- Chuck character
- Ryan McPartlin as Devon Woodcomb
- First appearance: "Chuck Versus the Intersect"
- Last appearance: "Chuck Versus the Goodbye"
- Portrayed by: Ryan McPartlin

In-universe information
- Nickname: "Captain Awesome"
- Gender: Male
- Title: Doctor
- Occupation: Cardiologist Cardiothoracic Surgeon
- Family: Dr. "Woody" Woodcomb (father); Dr. "Honey" Woodcomb (mother); Two younger brothers Chuck Bartowski (brother-in-law); Stephen Bartowski (father-in-law, deceased); Mary Elizabeth Bartowski (mother-in-law); Sarah Bartowski (Sister-in-law)
- Spouse: Dr. Eleanor Fay "Ellie" Woodcomb
- Children: Clara Woodcomb

Devon Christian Woodcomb, M.D., often referred to as Captain Awesome or simply Awesome, is a character on the TV series Chuck, and is portrayed by the actor Ryan McPartlin. The character's nickname comes from Chuck's assertion that "everything he does is awesome," and his frequent use of the word "awesome" in conversation. Devon is the significant other of Chuck's older sister, Ellie Bartowski, and marries her in the Season 2 finale. In the thirteenth episode of Season 4, their daughter Clara is born.

== Character profile ==
Devon Woodcomb is the son of Woody (Bruce Boxleitner) and Honey (Morgan Fairchild) Woodcomb, and has two younger brothers. He played football for UCLA, and met Ellie on the first day of medical school there. He gave her his lucky sweater because it matched her eyes. Devon specializes in cardiothoracic surgery, and is now practicing at Westside Medical Center with Ellie. Devon and Ellie live in the same Echo Park apartment complex as her brother, Chuck. He is very athletic, still being able to run a 4.4 second 40-yard dash. He has been described by Chuck as an "Adventure Sport Cardiologist".

== Character development ==
When originally cast, Devon was only planned to have appeared in a handful of episodes before being revealed as an enemy spy by the end of Season 1. However, because of the popularity of the character, this plan was dropped and Ryan McPartlin was added to the credits as a regular member of the cast for Season 2. Devon has appeared as a recurring major character throughout the first and second seasons, and began figuring more prominently toward the end of Season 2 as his suspicions grew, discovering Chuck's spy life in "Chuck Versus the Colonel," when he begins to provide cover for Chuck. He primarily appears in plots involving Chuck's home life, although he has been indirectly involved with the spy plots. For example, during a hostage crisis at the Buy More, Devon formulates a plan with Big Mike, Morgan, Jeff and Lester to take down their captor, Ned, who Chuck learns is part of a Fulcrum plot.

His nickname comes from Chuck's belief that "everything he does is awesome," including rock climbing, hang-gliding, speaking fluent Spanish, and flossing. He also frequently uses the word "awesome," to the point that, when under the effects of truth serum, Ellie angrily tells him that if everything is 'awesome,' then awesome becomes mediocre. All the other characters frequently use the nickname behind his back, except for Ellie; once, she does refer to his parents as the "Very Awesomes." Devon is very fit and active. In addition to extreme sports he's also an avid biker and frequently works out. Devon maintains a close relationship with his UCLA frat brothers, and prefers to watch UCLA's football team face perceived worthy opponents like USC rather than Stanford.

Devon is portrayed as very laid-back, and has only rarely been shown angry. Chuck's father describes him as a "straight arrow"; his and Ellie's mistaken belief that while drunk he may have gone too far with an exotic dancer at his bachelor party horrifies and shames him.

Devon is very much in love with Ellie, although they have fought in a few episodes. He wanted to buy a washer and dryer for their anniversary because he saw it as a chance for them to be able to spend more time together, which upset Ellie because when she left him to decide what to get he automatically chose what he wanted, rather than considering her feelings. He proposed to Ellie in the Season 1 finale with his great-grandmother's ring, and helped plan the wedding.

Devon sees Chuck as a surrogate brother and the man of Ellie's family in the absence of their father; he feels it is important that he have Chuck's permission before proposing marriage to her. On several occasions in the series, Devon has advised Chuck on his relationship with Sarah. He personally singled out several "candidates" for Chuck to date at the birthday party he and Ellie held for him, and when Ellie followed up on how Chuck was doing he noted "not awesome." He also teaches Chuck to tango when, unbeknownst to Devon, Chuck prepares for his first mission; Devon inadvertently taught Chuck the "women's part" of the dance. He coaches Morgan on his appearance, including tucking in his shirt and a focus on hair care products, and is impressed with Casey's physique.

Devon also mentors certain characters and makes an effort to get along with Chuck's friends. Although he's well aware of Morgan's crush on Ellie, Devon is not at all threatened by him, and when he finds Morgan on the bed with and comforting Ellie after she and Devon have a fight, Devon doesn't even suspect that she slept with Morgan. Devon shows signs of considering Morgan as something of a friend. He offers him advice on the finer points of being a man when Chuck is upset with Morgan's immaturity, and turns to Morgan for advice on how to woo Ellie. Devon also loans Morgan money for an apartment, but is later angered to find Morgan impulsively used the money to buy a used, barely functioning DeLorean. Devon allows Morgan to stay on the couch for a few days to escape Big Mike's relationship with his mother. He attempted to outsource some of his wedding-preparation responsibilities to Chuck by asking him to find a band. Jeff and Lester offered their services, and after a miserable audition, Jeff convinces Devon to give them a second chance. Although Jeffster! is still less than impressive, Devon tells Ellie that he can still let them live their dream for five minutes.

Devon has difficulty empathizing with other characters due to his awesome nature; when Jeff asks, "Have you ever had a dream that's never come true?" Devon has to think for a moment before admitting, "No." When trying to comfort Casey about his life, believing at the time that John is merely a Buy More employee, Devon tells about a time when his life was disappointing and unfulfilled, then confesses that such a time never actually happened.

Devon is confident about his appearance and masculinity. He frequently wears form-fitting sports attire or little to no clothing at all, a practice which bothers both Ellie and Chuck (though Chuck does congratulate Devon for what God gave him). He teaches Chuck to tango while wearing only underwear and his bathrobe (which he discards at one point) and has Chuck put his hands on his butt. For Halloween, he dresses up as Adam while wearing only flesh-colored underwear fitted with a fake fig leaf. This comfort level also extends towards sex in general, as he frequently makes suggestive remarks about Chuck and Sarah's sex life and his and Ellie's relationship.

In spite of his easy going, "valley" personality, Devon is highly intelligent and observant. Although he was not aware at the time that Chuck and Sarah's relationship was just a cover, he accurately recognized that Sarah's feelings for Chuck were genuine. He may have observed more than is good for him when going under due to a tranq and later a glimpse of General Beckman on Chuck's computer monitor. When he later learns of Chuck's secret life he is highly impressed with his brother-in-law as Chuck is not "just a loser who worked at the Buy More." Due to this knowledge he lets Morgan stall his wedding upon learning Chuck asked for it.

However, Devon does have moments that bring his intelligence to question. Mostly these are minor bouts where he seems devoid of common sense, such as packing a set of dumbbells for his trip to Africa or loaning Morgan, who is notorious for his immaturity and irresponsible behaviour, a sizable amount of money. But the few times Devon has been required to lie, Devon has either been unable to speak, or his lies have been so extravagantly transparent, Chuck has had to step in to spin a more believable yarn (to which, Devon, again, begins to overdo it, until Chuck interrupts and continues); Devon admits to being a terrible liar, to which a sardonic and disappointed Chuck can only respond, "Clearly."

Josh Schwartz indicated that Devon's knowledge of Chuck's secret life will lead to his becoming increasingly involved in Team Bartowski's spy operations as Season Three develops, and he got his first taste of the spy life in "Chuck Versus the Angel de la Muerte." Devon was initially enthusiastic about spy work and asked Chuck several times for a chance to participate for the adrenaline rush, but he eventually came to realize the sacrifices Chuck has had to make in his real life and decided he would rather live his whole life with Ellie than to give up any of it for a double life as a spy.

"Chuck Versus the Nacho Sampler" has shown that Devon was deeply affected by his capture by the Ring, leaving him jumpy and nervous, and showed a great deal of difficulty covering for Chuck with Ellie. He was shocked by the ease with which Chuck has learned to lie to his sister, and as a result refused to accept tickets to Paris Chuck gave her as part of his cover.

When his getaway with Ellie in "Chuck Versus the Beard" is interrupted by news that The Ring may be putting him and Ellie in danger, he grows very upset, especially since Chuck had told him that he and Ellie would be safe. He is then informed that it was a false alarm, but he later confronts Chuck, and is not comforted by Chuck's assurances that the government is doing everything possible to keep them safe. He proposes to Ellie that they get away-far away to Africa, working for Doctors Without Borders. In "Chuck Versus the Tic Tac," however, Ellie is accepted to a neurology fellowship at USC, a dream of hers since childhood, and despite his desire to get them both away from danger, he eventually sees how important it is to her and decides to try to make it work.

In "Chuck Versus the Role Models" Devon is poisoned by a Ring agent while in Africa in such a manner as to appear to be stricken by malaria. Devon returns to Burbank to recover in "Chuck Versus the Tooth," and expresses to Morgan his realization that even without spies life is dangerous, setting him at ease over his involvement in Chuck's double life for the first time since "Chuck Versus the Angel de la Muerte."

While Devon knew Chuck was a spy since the end of the second season, it is never made clear whether or not he is aware of the Intersect. It is unlikely, however, as the only time Devon asked about Chuck's training was when Chuck tranquilized a slew of CIA guards at a distance in "Chuck Versus Operation Awesome". Chuck then responded that he honed the skills by playing Duck Hunt. He is made aware of the existence of the Intersect in the fourth season as Ellie uncovers information about the project via the laptop and, one may assume, fully aware of Chuck's Intersect after Chuck's confession to Ellie and a demonstration Chuck provided in "Chuck Versus the Last Details."

In "Chuck Versus the Leftovers", Devon learns that Chuck has resumed his trade in espionage and, with restrained anger, expressed that he didn't want Ellie brought into that life. He demands that Chuck keeps his life away from Ellie, and expresses that he doesn't want to know about his spying. He does, however, accept Chuck's vocation, as he hands over Stephen's laptop, saying "I don't wanna know, and neither does Ellie, but if you're spying again, maybe it can help you."

== Major plots ==
Although typically part of each episode's "B" plot, Devon has infrequently been involved in the main plots. When Sarah is injured in an explosion and Bryce Larkin shows up to visit her, Devon takes it on himself to run interference and chase him off. Their ensuing conversation convinces Bryce that Sarah is no longer in love with him and that her feelings for Chuck are genuine.

Chuck and the male Buy More employees kidnap Devon for a bachelor party, though Chuck only participated because of its implications in a mission to steal Devon's hospital access card. Devon seemed pleased with the event, calling it "awesome," and explained to Ellie that Chuck and the boys kidnapped him into participation. He reaffirmed his love for Ellie during the bachelor party, declining to compromise his relationship with inappropriate behavior. However posing as a lady cop-themed stripper, Agent Alex Forrest lured him into the home theater room, where she attempted to remove the access card from him under the guise of a strip-search. When he refused, she tranquilized him. While in a state of momentary confusion before passing out, he overheard Chuck talk of the CIA. These glimpses did not seem to have a lasting impression, however. He later got a brief glance of General Beckman on Chuck's TV when he inadvertently triggered a video conference by uttering Chuck's CIA alias, Charles Carmichael. Ellie later viewed some photos taken of him with Agent Forrest, somewhat damaging Ellie and Devon's relationship.

In "Chuck Versus the Colonel" Devon, while trying to find Chuck, learns of John Casey's extensive surveillance of him from Lester and Jeff and uses keys from his locker to enter Casey's apartment. While attempting to access Casey's computer Devon unwittingly triggers a lockdown, with metal bars blocking the windows and doors of the apartment. When Casey arrives and begins to put a silencer on his pistol, a major confrontation ensues between Devon, Casey, Sarah, and Chuck during which Chuck admits to being a high-level CIA asset with Casey and Sarah as his handlers. Devon considers it "awesome" and agrees to cover for Chuck with Ellie. Devon later allows Morgan to stall his first wedding with Ellie when he tells Devon the order comes from Chuck. The second ceremony takes place later on the beach.

Devon is on call when Alejandro Goya, president of the nation of Costa Gravas, is nearly assassinated. Devon saves his life and is invited, along with Chuck and Sarah, to a gala event at the Costa Gravas embassy, where the team attempts to protect Goya. He eventually becomes directly involved in the team's mission when he accidentally mistakes Casey for the assassin, and takes advantage of the third assassination attempt to sneak Chuck and Sarah in to rescue him. At the end of the episode Devon is captured by the assassin, who works for the Ring. Being held hostage by Ring Operative Sydney, he is believed by the Ring to be an undercover CIA agent in the local area. Being forced into the spy world, Chuck has to handle Devon as Sydney assigns him to assassinate a man later revealed as Daniel Shaw; as planned as a setup to convince the Ring of Devon's abilities of a spy. While successful, this required Devon to become an asset in order to infiltrate the Ring, or at the least lure Sydney in order to cover his personal information. Chuck refuses, and devises a plan to remove Sydney without involving Devon.
