= Chuck Versus the Beard =

- Chuck episode
- Episode no.: Season 3 Episode 9
- Directed by: Zachary Levi
- Written by: Scott Rosenbaum
- Production code: 3X5809
- Original air date: March 8, 2010

Guest appearances
- Diedrich Bader as Del; Brandon Routh as Daniel Shaw; Cedric Yarbrough as Neil

Episode chronology
← Previous "Chuck Versus the Fake Name"	Next → "Chuck Versus the Tic Tac"

"Chuck Versus the Beard" is the ninth episode in the third season of the television series Chuck. It originally aired March 8, 2010, and was the television directorial debut of series star Zachary Levi. Chuck is benched when he fails to flash, and when the rest of the team is diverted by a decoy, must reveal his secret to Morgan so he can help foil a Ring plot to destroy Castle.

== Plot summary ==
Chuck is benched by Shaw when he fails to flash for a whole week in the aftermath of the team's previous mission.

Big Mike announces to the Buy More staff that their store is being sold and that representatives from Cost-Less will be interviewing the employees while the building is inspected prior to the sale.

Meanwhile, Sarah, Shaw and Casey head to a hotel where the Ring is attempting to turn a CIA agent. Sarah and Shaw trace a Ring phone call to a room at the hotel. Casey breaks into the room where the call was placed from and finds it deserted except for a Ring phone set up to play back a message. They realize that the Ring set them up to draw Shaw into the open and leave Castle undefended.

Jeff eavesdrops on two Ring agents as they announce their intentions to steal back all the data the team has on the Ring and destroy Castle and the store with it. Big Mike, believing they are to all be fired, has decided not to give up the store without a fight. The employees barricade themselves inside and refuse to leave when Chuck advises them to do so.

After accidentally stumbling into Castle, Morgan tracks down Chuck and reveals everything he has learned. Chuck and Morgan are interrogated in Castle's sparring room. Under threat of torture to Morgan, Chuck acknowledges that he is Agent Carmichael. A pep talk from Morgan causes Chuck to flash once again and take down the Ring spies while they wait for Sarah, Shaw and Casey. The Buy More revolt ends when Shaw, masquerading as a senior Buy More executive, tells Big Mike that they have decided not to sell the store due to the staff's dedication.

Sarah and Shaw are concerned that Castle is compromised. Shaw wonders why the Ring didn't take the opportunity to assassinate him.

== Production ==
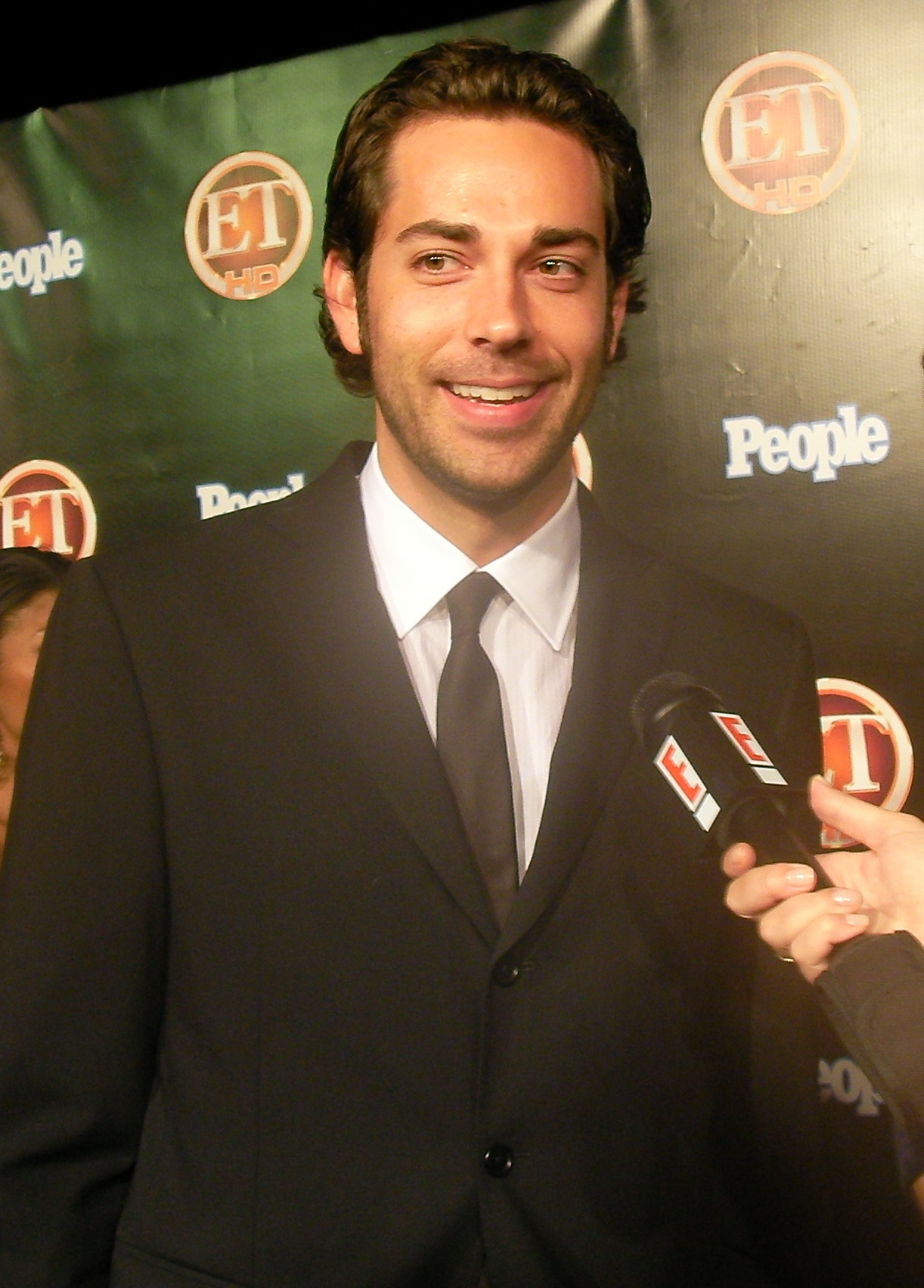
Series star Zachary Levi directed the episode.

"Chuck Versus the Beard" was the television directorial debut of series star Zachary Levi. This announcement first came in an interview on October 11, 2009.

On March 4, four sneak peeks of the episode were released. After the controversy of the previous two episodes, initial critical response to "Chuck Versus the Beard" was strongly positive. In her review of "Chuck Versus the Fake Name" Maureen Ryan in particular compared that episode negatively to "Chuck Versus the Beard".

== Reception ==
The episode received overwhelmingly positive reviews. Mo Ryan of the Chicago Tribune described the episode as "...everything I want in a Chuck episode and then some," particularly citing the depth of the main plot and its integration with the Buy More, and its use of the majority of the main and supporting cast. Alan Sepinwall of the New Jersey Star-Ledger also highly praised the episode, particularly the show finally letting Morgan in on Chuck's secret, and his enthusiastic reaction to his friend's important life as a spy. Sepinwall did note that some of Levi's directing choices were over the top, but otherwise approved of his first stint behind the camera for a television series, and also pointed out that two episodes in a row ended with a "Chuck really loves Sarah" moment. IGN rated the episode a 9.5 out of 10, a series high alongside the Season 2 episodes "Chuck Versus Santa Claus" and "Chuck Versus the Colonel", the Season 4 finale "Chuck Versus the Cliffhanger", and Season 5's "Chuck Versus the Kept Man" and "Chuck Versus the Goodbye".

Viewer response was also overwhelmingly positive, with a 9.9/10 user rating at IMDb.

Daniel Fienberg offered stronger criticism of the episode, finding fault in Levi's direction, with both the main and subplots overly outlandish. Although he did enjoy Morgan's handling of the spy plot and Chuck's secret, and noted it was a revelation that was long overdue, he felt the tone of the episode was off with "wackiness in excess." Like Sepinwall, he criticized the similarity of the endings of both "Chuck Versus the Fake Name" and "Chuck Versus the Beard".

The episode was watched by 6.3 million total viewers, with a 2.3/6 Demo.
