= Morgan Grimes =

Character on television series Chuck

- Chuck character
- Joshua Gomez as Morgan Grimes
- First appearance: "Chuck Versus the Intersect"
- Last appearance: "Chuck Versus the Goodbye"
- Portrayed by: Joshua Gomez; Andy Pessoa (Young Morgan)

In-universe information
- Alias: Michael Carmichael
- Nickname: The Bearded Bandit; The Bearded One; Organ; Ass Man (Assistant Manager); Little Elf (from Casey); Cobra; The Magnet
- Gender: Male
- Occupation: Buy More manager intelligence operative/analyst
- Family: Bolonia Garcia Boganvia Grimes Tucker (mother); Michael "Big Mike" Tucker (stepfather)
- Affiliation: Central Intelligence Agency; Operation Bartowski; Volkoff Industries; Buy More; John Casey (partner, employee, & roommate); Sarah Bartowski (team member-employer); Chuck Bartowski (best friend, team member & 'employee'-employer); Brigadier General Diane Beckman (former commanding officer & manager)
- Expertise: Tracking, unorthodox intelligence gathering, expansive cinema knowledge, store management Knowledge of Chuck and Ellie Bartowski

Morgan Guillermo Grimes is a major character on the television series Chuck. He is portrayed by actor Joshua Gomez, and is the best friend of Chuck Bartowski.

Morgan is the manager of the Burbank Buy More. He is also an employee of Chuck and Sarah Bartowski's Carmichael Industries. Morgan has provided assistance to Colonel John Casey when Casey is on a mission. Morgan lives with Casey's daughter, Alex McHugh.

== Biography ==
Morgan Grimes and Chuck Bartowski have been best friends since they were six years old. Much of that time Chuck has looked out for and protected Morgan, including from bullies, but Morgan has also been there for him through many of the most difficult moments of Chuck's life. When Chuck and Ellie's mother left, Morgan was there even though they were both too young to understand what it meant. He also was there to provide support when Chuck was expelled from Stanford and Jill dumped him for Bryce Larkin. In "Chuck Versus the Suitcase," Morgan is given a name tag which states he has been a "team member" at the Buy More since 2003.

As close as he is to Chuck, Morgan's relationship with Chuck's sister Ellie has been more complex. His long-time crush on Ellie is widely known; he claims to have "dedicated [himself] to the study of [Ellie] for the better part of 19 years" and in 1998 she established a "No Touch" policy. He's confessed to having hidden under Ellie's bed when younger to watch her undress. He also took her pillow to his high school's junior prom.

His mother's name is Bolonia (Patricia Rae), but little is known about his father other than he and Bolonia are no longer together. Morgan has implied in at least one episode even his own mother doesn't think much of him. Despite Bolonia's heavy Latin American accent, Morgan does not know how to speak Spanish. Morgan is also the only Hispanic employed at the Burbank Buy More. Morgan has no known siblings but does mention having a nephew. As a child he was teased with the nickname "Organ."

== Series ==
Morgan was unaware of Chuck's secret life until the Season 3 episode, "Chuck Versus the Beard." For much of the first season, Morgan is primarily used for comic relief in Chuck's personal life, although as the series progresses he begins to develop and gains more independence from his use as Chuck's foil. However, like Ellie and Devon Woodcomb, Morgan is rarely directly involved with the main plot of the episode. Much of Morgan's development as a character continues to center around his friendship with Chuck and events at the Buy More.

On occasion, Morgan is drawn into the main (spy) plot. Sometimes, Morgan simply unwittingly gives Chuck ideas that allow him to complete a mission. At other times, Morgan is inadvertently involved in the events of an episode, such as in "Chuck Versus the Crown Vic" and "Chuck Versus the Marlin." Prior to Season 3, Morgan's biggest roles in the main plots were in "Chuck Versus Santa Claus," where he plays a key role in helping Devon and Big Mike subdue Ned, and in "Chuck Versus the Best Friend," when he is misidentified by Smooth Lau as a spy.

But typically, Morgan is simply the focus of the Buy More subplots. For most of the first two seasons, he avoids a great deal of work and leads the other employees in mischief-making and rebellions against the tyrannical assistant manager of the moment, but is nevertheless gradually given more responsibility. Parallel to this development is his romantic development, mostly encapsulated in his on-again, off-again relationship with coworker Anna Wu.

In an early episode in the series, Morgan pursues Sarah's DEA friend Carina, and he unknowingly becomes involved in the spy intrigue of the episode. Carina is uninterested enough in Morgan to frequently forget his name, but feigns a romantic interest in him at her convenience.

Morgan's professional life and romantic life both make a transition at the end of the second season and beginning of the third season. When Emmett tricks Morgan into helping him take Big Mike's position as manager, Morgan reluctantly accepts a promotion to assistant manager to protect the other employees from Emmett and hold the store together. With Anna's encouragement, he shrugs off that burden, quits the Buy More, and asks Anna to accompany him to Hawaii where he chases his dream of becoming a Benihana chef. About six months later, Morgan returns to Los Angeles and reveals to Chuck that he was failing in his class, and that Anna left him for another classmate.

Since the later episodes of the second season, Morgan is also dealing with the unpleasant and awkward situation of a romantic relationship between Big Mike and his mother, the graphic details of which he is frequently made aware.

After returning from Hawaii and getting reinstated at the Buy More, Morgan takes the opportunity to move in with Chuck after Devon and Ellie take the lease on the apartment next door. In an effort to cheer Chuck up, Morgan takes him out on the town after sitting around their largely unfurnished apartment playing video games. By chance they end up at the same club as Sarah and Carina. While at the club, Morgan repeatedly fails to hook up with any of the women there, or even get close to the bar. The next day at work he mentions to Jeff and Lester how his "girlfriend" Carina is back in town, but neither is convinced Carina would have anything to do with him. The three concoct a plan for him to get together with her by throwing a housewarming party for himself and Chuck at their apartment. She shows him even greater disregard, but when Morgan stands up to her and says "No," actions to which she is unaccustomed, Carina becomes interested and they sleep together.

Shortly thereafter, Morgan is again promoted to assistant manager, this time by Big Mike. At first, Morgan must quell the kinds of mischief and rebellions he used to lead, and he enjoys some early success with advice from Big Mike and help from John Casey. Afterward, he begins to enlist Lester and Jeff's help in stalking Hannah (in whom he takes a romantic interest) and Chuck (whom he learns is lying to him). Both investigations converge with a shattering effect on Morgan as he discovers them beginning a relationship.

When Chuck ends that relationship and Hannah leaves, Chuck's secrets take Morgan to the breaking point of their friendship, but then Morgan stumbles into Chuck's spy life, and Chuck (initially under duress) reveals the secret story of the last two and a half years. Morgan is tremendously relieved. Despite the risks associated with Morgan knowing of this, Chuck convinces his handlers to allow Morgan to stay a part of his life, allowing him to finally reaffirm their friendship on new terms. Morgan is one of only a handful of people outside Team Bartowski who know Chuck is the Intersect and who are not imprisoned. Morgan accepts Chuck's spy life and is relieved that his friend was only trying to protect him. For his part, Chuck's relief that Morgan accepts him as-is allows him to regain the confidence to access the Intersect again, and he saves both of their lives when he flashes on martial arts.

Morgan played a pivotal role in the rescue of Sarah in "Chuck Versus the Other Guy." After quitting the Buy More when promised a place on Chuck's team, he recognized that the fight between Shaw and several Ring agents had been staged to make it look like Shaw had fought off the agents. He also proved instrumental in waking Casey out of the funk he had been in following his dismissal from the NSA and convincing him to help Chuck stop Shaw from killing Sarah in retaliation for his wife's death. Morgan subsequently got his job at the Buy More back when Big Mike revealed he didn't have the heart to advertise for a replacement, and at Casey's request was officially made a member of Operation Bartowski.

When Chuck and Sarah went AWOL together at the end of "Chuck Versus the Other Guy," Beckman ordered Casey to enlist Morgan's aid in tracking the couple down in "Chuck Versus the Honeymooners." Morgan quickly proved himself a valuable asset in the search due to his nearly encyclopedic knowledge of Chuck's life, and he helped Casey narrow where to begin the search. During the mission, Morgan helped them apprehend a defecting Basque terrorist, and his obsession with preparing for the mission to Europe—including exhaustive study of and fascination with Lake Como—helped him recognize that the two Interpol agents who arrived to take custody of terrorist were in fact a trap.

Anna returned to Burbank in "Chuck Versus the Tooth," and Morgan was forced to contend with lingering feelings which he likened to Chuck's own relationship with Sarah. When Anna witnessed Morgan's new-found sense of responsibility and purpose, and the manner in which he casually brushed her off on two occasions in order to help Chuck with a mission, she realized she wanted him back. Despite his feelings, Morgan admitted that if it took leaving him for Anna to realize she truly wanted him, then she wasn't the woman he wanted to be with and shot her down when she attempted to reconcile with him.

In "Chuck Versus the Ring: Part II," Morgan worked with Ellie and Devon to save Sarah, Casey and Chuck from imminent death at the hands of Shaw using a rocket from Casey's Crown Vic. He also helped apprehend the Ring Elders and broke his thumbs in order to free himself and help evacuate the Buy More when Shaw tried to blow it up. He later found the detonator and accidentally blew up the store by dropping it since his hands were heavily bandaged. Also, in the finale, he became acquainted with Casey's daughter Alex, but he was told by Casey to stop flirting with her. Morgan, nevertheless, continued to speak with Alex.

Morgan was promoted to manager of the Buy More by Brigadier General Beckman in "Chuck Versus the Suitcase," after successfully identifying that the Buy More functioned too efficiently and pleasantly to successfully operate under the cover of a retail chain, and rectifying it by rehiring the store's former civilian employees. After beginning to date Alex in "Chuck Versus the Coup d'Etat," Morgan was placed in the position of having to tell Casey, who nearly strangled Morgan after the revelation. However, when Morgan was first shot and then nearly sacrificed himself to electrocute members of Casey's former team to save Casey, Chuck and Sarah (dying for three seconds in the process), Casey relented and gave his blessing with the warning of what would happen if Morgan were to break Alex's heart. Following his actions in "Chuck Versus the Couch Lock," Casey began including Morgan more directly in spy operations, acknowledging that he may indeed have value as part of the team. Casey admired Morgan's courage and dedication to his subordinates' safety in "Chuck Versus the Leftovers," and lent him a sidearm for close-quarters combat, despite Morgan's less than stellar marksmanship.

In "Chuck Versus Phase Three," Morgan explained to Sarah that a folded-up paper she found in Chuck's work shirt pocket was Chuck's proposal plan because he wanted to marry her. The plan was put on hold while Chuck had to deal with losing the intersect.

In "Chuck Versus the Cliffhanger," Morgan puts on a pair of sunglasses found in a box left for Chuck in Castle, not realizing at the time that he was downloading the Intersect. Though the team assumed that Beckman sent the glasses, they were in fact sent by Clyde Decker, intended for Chuck. The Intersect Morgan had was faulty, altered his personality, made him reckless, caused memory loss, joined Gertrude Verbanski and made Morgan break up with Alex over a text message. Chuck was able to coax Morgan back to himself by reminding him of how they got back at a bully in grade school. However, Morgan had also let out that he was the Intersect, causing Decker to put a kill order out on him. After Beckman removed the Intersect, she managed to call off the assassins, all but one: the Viper. When the team apparently caught the Viper and Morgan felt safe enough to try to apologize to Alex, the real Viper showed up, but she was stopped by the Bartowskis. Morgan and Alex eventually get back together with help from the Woodcombs.

In "Chuck Versus the Goodbye," Alex officially moves in with Morgan and Casey but her father moves out to be with Verbanski.

== Development ==
In March, 2007, Joshua Gomez was cast in what was then the role of "Morgan Pace," joining Zachary Levi (Chuck), Yvonne Strahovski (Sarah), and Adam Baldwin (John Casey). Prior to the beginning of filming his last name was changed to Grimes. Much like the character he portrays, Gomez is an avid gamer. Additionally, Levi and Gomez quickly established a close friendship when production began and Levi describes themselves as "Two little peas in a pod."

As the series has progressed, the show involved less of the relationship between Chuck and Morgan. Morgan began to feature more into the Buy More sub-plots, and although Gomez enjoys them, misses the interaction between Chuck and Morgan from earlier in the series. Gomez has also expressed an interest in being involved in more of the show's action.

At WonderCon 2009, it was indicated Big Mike would be upgrading Morgan's position at the Buy More. Indeed, Big Mike promoted Morgan to assistant manager. After the Buy More's destruction and reconstruction as a CIA/NSA cover, Morgan returned initially as merely a salesman, but was quickly promoted to store manager by General Beckman.

== Personality ==
Morgan begins the series as immature and spends most of his time at the Buy More, keeping company with Chuck, playing video games, or some combination of the above. He is extremely talkative, loyal, and expresses a romantic interest in Chuck's sister, Ellie. He is somewhat romantic even at this stage of his character development, taking a pronounced interest in a girl named Karina (who was in fact an undercover agent) and in the debut episode he claimed that his attraction to a famous porn star was in fact "love." Over the course of the series, he progresses in his romantic and professional life, and though his friendship with Chuck continues to be important to him, he becomes more independent. He has shown himself to be very courageous in the face of fear or adversity: when the Ring tried to take over the Buy More, he encouraged Chuck to fight for their country. He has also taken on a Bengal tiger in order to protect Casey, he broke his thumbs in order to evacuate the Buy More and save lives from a possible explosion, risked very likely fatal electrocution to save his team-mates, and engaged armed terrorists to rescue his employees; each time earning Casey's admiration.

=== Professional life ===
Aside from a brief resignation to train as a Benihana chef in Hawaii and being effectively laid off for a few months after Daniel Shaw's bomb destroyed the store, Morgan has been employed by the Burbank Buy More since 2003. Throughout the first two seasons, Morgan is frequently involved in antics in the store, often including misuse of store equipment: he has destroyed a store display computer by picking up a virus when surfing for porn, he has become the store champ of a TV show guessing competition on the video wall and has used the storage cage for a Thunderdome match to determine the new assistant store manager. Chuck has told Morgan he's not allowed access to Chuck's advanced demos of new games without "adult supervision." Morgan has also been known to "borrow" Buy More's DVDs off the shelf, copy them, and then re-shrinkwrap them before returning them. He has also nearly gotten in trouble for sexual harassment and has skipped work to visit an arcade.

He has, however, shown signs of growing responsibility. Though Morgan is a poor salesman, Big Mike placed him in charge of the store for Black Friday in both seasons, and when Emmett Milbarge is threatening to fire much of the staff, Morgan takes it upon himself to try to hold the store together despite having to endure abuse from all sides. He quits the Buy More in "Chuck Versus the Colonel" with the encouragement of his girlfriend and moves to Hawaii to chase his dream of becoming a Benihana chef. After failing at that, he returns to the Buy More. Big Mike soon promotes him to assistant manager, and he successfully quells the kind of employee mischief and rebellions he used to lead. In emulation of Big Mike, Morgan is revealed to have a "fish" mounted on his office wall. In this case, it is a Billy Bass.

He initially returns to the government-rebuilt Buy More as a green shirt under interim store manager Diane (a/k/a Brigadier General Diane Beckman of the National Security Agency). While readily acknowledging to Diane that he knows nothing about running a CIA/NSA base, Morgan posits that he does know about running a Buy More. A dubious Diane gives him five minutes to plead his case; he requires only two minutes to convince her that her staff of undercover agents and analysts have made the store so incredibly efficient, tidy and friendly that its cover is virtually transparent. Diane immediately authorizes Morgan to rehire the former staff of surly, creepy and lazy green shirts and Nerd Herders, and appoints him store manager the following day. Morgan teams with his partner, John Casey, to forcibly retrieve Nerd Herders Jeff Barnes and Lester Patel (if not other employees as well) with a tranquilizer gun.

=== Friendship with Chuck ===
Morgan's most important relationship since childhood is his friendship with Chuck. Morgan was there for Chuck through the abandonment by his parents, Bryce's betrayal and the resulting expulsion from Stanford, and his painful break-up with Jill; in turn, Chuck has saved Morgan countless times. He is very nosy about Chuck's personal life (to the extent that he doesn't see why Chuck would object to Morgan knowing his ATM PIN) and believes his approval of Chuck's girlfriends is important.

Like Ellie, Morgan can be highly protective of Chuck and their continued close friendship. In the first season, he is generally unsupportive of any career or romantic progress that might drive him and Chuck apart. So when Ellie tries to push Chuck into moving forward with his life, Morgan objects on the grounds that Chuck was not ready for the "real world" and insists on having a part in drawing up a five-year plan for Chuck. At the end of the first season, Morgan is aghast to find an engagement ring in Chuck's bag that he assumes is meant for Sarah.

In the second season, Morgan becomes more supportive of Chuck's relationship with Sarah and helps protect him from new threats at work. Morgan stood up to Milbarge to protect Chuck, and when Chuck skipped his interview for an emergency mission, Morgan tried unsuccessfully to interview on his behalf. Recalling the long-term pain that Jill caused Chuck with their first break-up, Morgan was upset when he thought Chuck was cheating on Sarah with Jill. Later, Morgan is distressed to learn that Ellie supported Chuck's intent to break up with Sarah, and quickly reminded her that Sarah was the best thing to have happened to Chuck since the Jill break-up. Morgan was even willing to go to the extreme measure of delaying Ellie's wedding to cover for Chuck.

He is visibly hurt when Chuck keeps secrets from him, and is particularly stung when Chuck shames him in front of Anna and others. He still feels betrayed when, late in the second season, Chuck interviews for a job at Roark Instruments, where Morgan could not join him, without even informing him. In the third season, he is aghast to learn that Chuck is outright lying to him and conspires with Lester and Jeff to get underneath the seeming "web of conspiracy and deception" surrounding Chuck. He is also crushed when he sees Chuck making out with Hannah, whom he was interested in. When Morgan discovers the secret Castle base below the store and Chuck's secret life as a spy, however, his resentment of Chuck's secrecy vanishes and he considers it the greatest day of his life.

His friendship with Chuck has saved Morgan on numerous occasions, most notably in "Chuck Versus the Beard", where Morgan is nearly put into witness protection in the aftermath of the episode. Chuck vouches for Morgan, admitting his faults, but defending his loyalty as Chuck's best friend, to which Sarah, unenthusiastically, sides with Chuck. His loyalty to Chuck does fail when pitted against Sarah's interrogation techniques, however, when Chuck confides in Morgan in "Chuck Versus the Living Dead" and Morgan, clad in a bulletproof vest and riot shield, caves under her gaze.

At the start of the fifth season, Chuck uses Morgan's skills to help find the perfect house for Sarah, Chuck wanting to surprise Sarah keeps the search a secret. when Sarah realises the two are up to something, she dresses up in a seductive pose and breaks Chuck and then takes the planning binder from Morgan.

=== Romantic life ===
A recurring thread throughout much of the first season is Morgan's obsessive love for Ellie Bartowski, which is not reciprocated. However, as the series progressed, the two came to an understanding and developed something of a friendship after "bonding over an 'I miss Chuck' moment". Morgan has admitted that he sees Ellie as a sister, albeit one with whom he wants to have sex. Morgan's crush on Ellie generated some problems in "Chuck Versus the Nemesis" when he brought Anna Wu to Thanksgiving dinner.

Morgan fruitlessly chases Carina early in the first season, not knowing that she's a DEA agent or that she's leading him on.

But Morgan's most significant relationship in the series' first two seasons, aside from his friendship with Chuck, is with his on again/off again girlfriend Anna Wu, who during that time also works at the Buy More as a member of the Nerd Herd. Morgan's immature behavior acts as a barrier to a stable relationship between them. When they are together, his antics and fear of commitment (to someone other than Chuck) often create problems, and when they are apart, his jealousy leads him to stalkerish behavior. When Morgan and Anna first explore moving in together, he borrows $2500 from Captain Awesome for a deposit on an apartment, which he then impulsively spends on a used, broken-down DeLorean. When Anna finds an apartment lease intended for Chuck and himself, mistakenly believing Morgan intended to move in with her, Morgan attempted to repel her indirectly rather than tell the truth. Later, he realizes he truly does want to be with her and accepts. However, Morgan evidently does not finalize living arrangements with Anna and still lives with his mother until the end of the second season. Anna proves protective and supportive of Morgan: she fought a much larger, stronger man on Morgan's behalf and, in "Chuck Versus the Colonel," encourages Morgan to stop tolerating mistreatment at the Buy More and chase his dreams. He follows her advice and asks her to accompany him to Hawaii while he trains to be a Benihana chef, and she accepts. More than six months later, Anna leaves him for one of his classmates, and Morgan returns to Los Angeles.

In "Chuck Versus the Three Words," he once again runs into Carina, and this time she doesn't even make an effort at showing interest; after he summons the confidence to tell her off, she becomes attracted to him and sleeps with him. Despite only seemingly having recently gained experience with women, he is apparently very skilled in bed: Carina remarks that while he isn't the best lover she's had, there were very few better.

Morgan later takes an interest in Hannah from the moment she enters the Buy More, and returns to an old habit when he recruits Jeff and Lester to stalk her and discover her interests, which he pretends to share. He is momentarily distracted from pursuing her, however, when she reveals that Chuck traveled to Paris and kept it a secret from him.

During Anna's return to "Chuck Versus the Tooth", he constantly avoids talking to her while concentrating on more pressing matters, such as Chuck's mission then his detainment. While she originally only wished to return a box of his items, his new-found sense of responsibility leads her to realize she misses him; but despite his reciprocating feelings, he rejects her as he notes that it took her to have left to know she wanted him, something he didn't want in a partner.

In "Chuck Versus the Ring: Part II", Casey discovers that Morgan has his daughter Alex's phone number. Morgan asserts that they only want to be friends, but Casey can tell from Morgan's pulse and other signs that he is lying (however, as Casey was throttling Morgan to ascertain these signs, Morgan's note that Casey was choking him was a valid possibility to the cause of these signs). Morgan later flirts with Alex, and Casey threatens him. Nevertheless, Morgan continues to communicate with Alex and encourages Casey to be part of her life. Impressed by Morgan's courage and loyalty when he willingly nearly electrocutes himself to save the team, Casey deems Morgan fit to date Alex, but warns him not to break her heart. He realizes that he loves Alex when Chuck points out that Morgan is not bothered by Alex wearing his "previously unworn, original issue Zemeckis-authenticated Back to the Future t-shirt" nor her messy consumption of pizza and orange juice. When Casey intimidatingly confronts Morgan after seeing Alex leaving Morgan's and Chuck's apartment that morning in one of Morgan's shirts, Morgan initially attempts to deny the sexual component to his relationship with Alex but eventually explains that he cares deeply about Alex; Casey then releases his grip on Morgan and explains, "That's all I wanted to hear." Some weeks later, Morgan goes to dinner for the first time with Alex's mother and the latter's suitor.

=== The Morgan ===
In "Chuck Versus the First Kill" Chuck introduces a move he calls "the Morgan." It is performed by twisting the body to the side and raising one knee to cover the groin, while covering both face and groin with his hands. According to Chuck, Morgan used this stance to protect himself from being hit in school, often by girls.

The Morgan only appeared thrice in the show, twice performed by Chuck and once by Morgan. All three times resulted in fatality to the attackers.

=== Morgan and the Intersect ===
At the end of the fourth season, Morgan accidentally uploads the Intersect. However, soon after uploading, the Intersect begins to malfunction in Morgan's head causing paranoia, a change in personality, and partial amnesia, as Morgan proves unable to remember who Indiana Jones or Luke Skywalker is. Morgan becomes reckless, arrogant, selfish and narcissistic under the effects of the Intersect; he carelessly addresses himself as the Intersect, he jumps into situations best attacked covertly, he bullies Verbanski's agents and breaks up with Alex using a text message. It was later discovered that the malfunction was expected by Clyde Decker, who supplied the glasses in the hopes that Chuck would be the recipient of the faulty Intersect. Decker is likely to have deliberately sabotaged the Intersect program on the glasses in the first place. The CIA, led by Decker, issued a kill order for Morgan because he was telling everyone that he was the Intersect, and the team asks General Beckman for help. Finally, in "Chuck Versus the Business Trip" Morgan gets the Intersect removed with the help of General Beckman.
