= Chuck Versus the Predator =

- Chuck episode
- Episode no.: Season 2 Episode 17
- Directed by: Jeremiah S. Chechik
- Written by: Chris Fedak
- Production code: 3T7268
- Original air date: March 23, 2009

Guest appearances
- Bonita Friedericy as Brigadier General Diane Beckman; Tony Hale as Emmett Milbarge; Patricia Rae as Bolonia Garcia Boganvia Grimes; Matt Roth as a Buy More employee; Arnold Vosloo as Vincent Smith; Matt Winston as Barclay

Episode chronology
← Previous "Chuck Versus the Lethal Weapon"	Next → "Chuck Versus the Broken Heart"

"Chuck Versus the Predator" is the seventeenth episode of the second season of Chuck. It originally aired on NBC on March 23, 2009.

== Plot ==
Chuck Bartowski reluctantly tells his handlers that he has been contacted by Orion, the mastermind behind the Intersect computer and the person who can erase the Intersect from his brain. When the team goes to retrieve the computer Orion sent to Chuck, they run into a Fulcrum agent named Vincent. After Orion's computer is brought back successfully, General Beckman arrives in person to oversee the operation to locate Orion. Meanwhile, a conflict breaks out between the Burbank and Beverly Hills Buy More branches.

== Critical response ==
"Chuck Versus the Predator" received positive reviews from critics. Steve Heisler of The A.V. Club gave the episode an A, though he expressed disappointment that plot points were resolved so quickly. Eric Goldman of IGN gave the episode a 9 out of 10, praising the burglary scene. "From Jeff and Lester mistaking Sarah and Casey for, well, Jeff and Lester; to Emmett spraying mace in Jeff and Lester's face; to Casey revealing he still had a gun on him, despite Chuck telling him not to, this sequence was expertly constructed."

The episode drew 6.156 million viewers.
