= Daniel Shaw =

- Chuck character
- Brandon Routh as Daniel Shaw
- First appearance: "Chuck Versus the Three Words"
- Last appearance: "Chuck Versus the Santa Suit"
- Portrayed by: Brandon Routh

In-universe information
- Alias: Blackbriar (codename)
- Gender: Male
- Occupation: Rogue CIA agent
- Family: John Shaw (father); Mary Shaw (mother); Evelyn "Eve" Shaw (wife; deceased)
- Affiliation: Government of the United States; Operation Bartowski; The Ring (turned)
- Expertise: High-ranking CIA operative with extensive espionage training; Expert on the Ring; The Intersect provides instant access to highly-classified intelligence and advanced skills via "flashes"

Daniel Shaw is a fictional character in the television series Chuck. Shaw is introduced in the third season episode "Chuck Versus Operation Awesome" as a government agent specializing in the terrorist organization known as the Ring, and who becomes a mentor to Chuck Bartowski and ultimately a tragic villain and host for the Intersect. He is portrayed by actor Brandon Routh.

== Series ==
Shaw briefly appears, largely off-camera, talking with General Beckman in the third season episode, "Chuck Versus the Three Words". After the completion of the team's mission with Carina, Beckman begs Shaw to allow her to disclose the full details of the assignment, but Shaw leaves her office without a word.

Shaw reappears in "Chuck Versus Operation Awesome", the first of eight episodes in which he was scheduled to have a speaking part in Season 3. Devon Woodcomb's actions prior to this episode led Ring agents to believe that he is a "world-class spy," and Devon is coerced into a mission to kill an unknown person in a CIA facility so that he can prove he is "turned" to the Ring. When Chuck helps Devon reach the office of the target, the target is revealed to be Shaw, who is ready for Chuck's arrival. Shaw's first act in the episode is to fake his death and make it appear that Devon is responsible.

Later, General Beckman introduces Shaw as an expert on the Ring, and places Shaw in command of Operation Bartowski, having been briefed on the team and Chuck's position as the Intersect. When Chuck lures Sydney, the Ring operative after Devon, to the Buy More, Shaw insists on Chuck dealing with his own problems but is ultimately forced down by Casey. He returns to kill Sydney and save Chuck. He is later seen observing the dinner of most of the main characters and pulls out a ring, hinting him to be, or have been, married. In "Chuck Versus First Class", Shaw tells Sarah that he was once married to a fellow spy, Evelyn (later played by Kelly Thiebaud), but that she was killed by a Ring agent five years before.

In "Chuck Versus the Mask", Shaw begins expressing a romantic interest in Sarah, which she initially and strongly rejects. Shaw attempts to deny that he is making advances until, when exposed to cyclosarin gas, he acknowledges that he had actually been approaching her. Sarah admits that she overreacted, and somewhat enjoyed his advances. By the end of "Chuck Versus the Fake Name" Sarah returns his affection and they begin a relationship.

Shaw's service in the series had mostly been relegated to background work from Castle due to the threat against him from the Ring. However, despite initial attempts to kill Shaw, the Ring opts not to target him when they lure him out of Castle and have him "dead to rights" in a setup. This is explained in the episode "Chuck Versus the American Hero", where it is revealed that the Ring intended to bring Shaw in alive so that the Director could meet with him face to face. Shaw uses this opportunity to offer himself up as bait in order to target the Ring's leadership to avenge his wife's death. While in the Ring's custody, Shaw is played a surveillance video of his wife's death, revealing that Sarah killed Evelyn as part of a "red test." After being incapacitated by a Ring operative and rescued from an air strike on the Ring's compound by Chuck, Shaw escapes from the hospital to track Sarah down. As the episode ends, he is driving her to an undisclosed location "to settle an old score."

After the revelation of his wife's death, Shaw turns to the Ring when told by the Director that the CIA believes Evelyn Shaw turned as well and therefore had her killed, although the Director never actually confirms Eve had indeed joined them. Shaw gives the Ring technical data to allow them to complete their Intersect project. He also attempts to murder Sarah, both as revenge for killing Evelyn and as payback against the CIA for betraying him and his wife. Chuck interrupts the attempt, having tracked Shaw down after going through his files and papers that he had written while at West Point. Shaw subdues Chuck and tells him that he is not at fault and that he will not identify him as the Intersect as long as he does not interfere. Chuck refuses to let Shaw hurt Sarah, however, and attempts to defuse the situation peacefully. Knowing Chuck's reluctance to kill and driven by his desire for revenge, Shaw draws his gun, forcing Chuck to shoot Shaw first, presumably killing him.

In "Chuck Versus the Tooth" Shaw appears in Chuck's dream sequences throughout the episode, giving him hints to a Ring operation that was underway. The episode ends with the apparition of Shaw from his nightmares telling Chuck he is still alive, before proceeding to strangle him.

In "Chuck Versus the Living Dead", Shaw is revealed to be alive, and downloads the Ring's Intersect prior to the end of the episode. In the next episode "Chuck Versus the Subway", Shaw discredits the team by fooling them into storming a hearing between Beckman and a military panel over the fate of the Intersect project. Shaw claimed to have been acting as a double agent to infiltrate the Ring and compliments Chuck as a hero before exposing Dr. Dreyfus's analysis of Chuck's condition. Beckman attempts to defend Chuck by describing his successes. Chuck observes Shaw's flash on her mention of Alexis White, and throws a knife at Shaw in an effort to force him to reveal he had downloaded the Intersect; Shaw nevertheless resists, which discredits Operation Bartowski and Beckman. After Chuck's escape from custody, Shaw takes Sarah and Casey into custody as bait. However, Chuck and Stephen Bartowski instead locate the Ring base where Shaw downloads his Intersect. There it is revealed that Dr. Kowambe's research was used to save his life. Shaw intercepts them and steals Chuck's Governor, a device designed to protect the human Intersect from going insane, and fatally shoots Stephen. Shaw later attempts to execute the team, but is ambushed by Devon and Morgan, who rescue them with Casey's Crown Vic.

The extent of Shaw's plans are revealed in "Chuck Versus the Ring: Part II". With Beckman discredited, Shaw is to take her place at a gathering of senior members of the intelligence community. At the conference, the Ring's leaders, known as the Elders, would then stage a takeover of the NSA and CIA. Chuck tricks Shaw into both identifying the Elders and confessing that he is now a member of the Ring, which is broadcast to the entire convention. His unwitting confession clears Beckman and the team, while Casey and Morgan capture the Elders. Shaw manages to escape before turning up at the Buy More, planting explosives and demanding that Chuck face him. After capturing Sarah and Morgan, who were attempting to interfere, he faces Chuck in hand-to-hand combat. Shaw initially gains the upper hand due to Chuck's malfunctioning Intersect, but is finally defeated as Chuck regains control of himself, and soon has him in a choke hold. Shaw urges Chuck to finish the job, but instead, Chuck releases him before Sarah knocks Shaw out with a metal beam. Shaw is then taken into custody and the Governor is returned to Chuck.

As revealed in "Chuck Versus the Santa Suit", Shaw is responsible for Clyde Decker's persecution of Chuck. When Decker came to interrogate Shaw earlier, the latter used information from the Intersect to blackmail him, thereby manipulating Decker and his team to work for him from his own cell. The release of the Omen virus that he orchestrated then freed him from his cell. Still seeking revenge against Chuck and, especially, Sarah, he then returned to Castle and captured Sarah. He uses this situation to force Chuck to infiltrate the CIA and recover the Macau device from Decker's office. Shaw planned to upload and erase the CIA's database to create a new Intersect 3.0 so that they would be forced to rely on him for intelligence and so that he could defeat Chuck even more easily. However, Chuck realizes his plan and modified the Macau device to upload the virus, not CIA intel. When Shaw put on the Intersect glasses, he gets only one flash of a Christmas cartoon, forcing him to fight Chuck in the Buy-More one-on-one without the Intersect. When Shaw is about to go for his gun, Ellie returns to knock him out. When returned to prison, he requests Sarah's presence and reveals to her that he knows about Hungary and has already set something in motion there. He then asks her if Chuck knows about "the baby".

== Development ==
Brandon Routh's casting as CIA officer Daniel Shaw was announced on August 27, 2009. Shaw will be presenting a romantic obstacle between Chuck and Sarah, and reports by Kristin Dos Santos of E! Online have indicated that Shaw and Sarah would be sharing an intimate moment. Shaw will also serve as a mentor for Chuck as he learns to control the Intersect.

In addition to the conflict between Chuck and Sarah, Josh Schwartz and Chris Fedak have indicated that Shaw's presence will also affect Casey, due to his orders to assume command of the team.

Routh describes Shaw as the government's foremost expert on the Ring, and that this was among the reasons of his assignment to Team Bartowski. In addition, Zachary Levi indicates the character is everything that Chuck wants to be, but has not yet become. Routh hints that the relationship between Chuck and Shaw will not be entirely antagonistic, with Shaw serving the role of a "big brother" as he helps Chuck learn to live up to his potential as a spy. Routh also states that Shaw and Chuck both come from similar backgrounds.

=== Personality ===
Shaw has a habit of repeatedly flipping open and closing his lighter. Like Chuck, he has an aversion to guns and killing, but is prepared to use deadly force if necessary. Shaw recognizes Chuck's potential as a spy and aims to push him when necessary, though he is always ready to pull him out if things go badly. However, when Shaw turns to the Ring, he underestimates Chuck in both of his fights with him. Finally, Shaw does not expect Chuck to be able to beat him without the Governor, nor does he expect Chuck to "reboot" and defeat him during the Buy More fight.

Although generally portrayed as cold and emotionless, Shaw is still highly sensitive where his wife is concerned and reacts angrily when shown footage by the Director revealing that Sarah killed Eve. Ultimately, these lingering feelings for his wife lead to his downfall, as the Director uses his anger and grief to turn him to the Ring by playing on his single-minded desire for revenge. This desire is initially directed against Sarah, but following the events in Paris Shaw has shifted the focus of his hatred onto Chuck instead. He nonetheless warns Sarah that he would still greatly enjoy the opportunity to kill her, but sees her demise as more of a bonus than a necessity.

Throughout his presence on the team and later as an antagonist, Shaw often disparages Chuck's strong feelings for Sarah, his friends, and his family, and expresses a belief that emotional connections are a liability and get in the way of being a good spy. In "Chuck Versus the Other Guy" he says that he does not believe Chuck is capable of killing, and therefore does not anticipate Chuck shooting him to protect Sarah. In "Chuck Versus the Ring: Part II" he considers Chuck weak for not killing him after being defeated in their fight in the Buy More, which Sarah defends as actually being a strength.

In "Chuck Versus the Santa Suit", Shaw becomes a purely villainous character; he murders two guards escaping from prison, kidnaps Sarah, shoots Casey and admits to be a criminal mastermind behind the Omen Virus Operation. He confesses to blackmailing Decker after a flash he had in an interrogation Decker was conducting. He further admits that the only reason he wants Sarah alive is so that she can see Shaw murder Chuck in front of her.

== Notes ==
- According to Morgan Grimes, Shaw is 6' 2", weighs 220 lbs., and has raven black hair.
- In "Chuck Versus the American Hero", Shaw is seen driving a black Tesla Roadster.
