= Diane Beckman =

- Chuck character
- Bonita Friedericy as General Diane Beckman
- First appearance: "Chuck Versus the Helicopter"
- Last appearance: "Chuck Versus the Goodbye"
- Portrayed by: Bonita Friedericy

In-universe information
- Gender: Female
- Title: Brigadier General
- Occupation: Director of the NSA; United States Air Force; Buy More manager (cover)
- Significant other: Roan Montgomery (longtime lover)

Brigadier General M. Diane Beckman, USAF is a fictional character in the NBC television series Chuck. Beckman is a senior official of the National Security Agency, working within the Office of the Director of National Intelligence. She holds her rank of brigadier general in the United States Air Force. She revealed that she spent a significant amount of time and resources hunting Orion, the Intersect's chief designer, before he re-appeared and made a deal with the government. Little information about her personal life and past service has been revealed. She first entered the military prior to August 14, 1974, and fought in two battles during the Gulf War. She has had a non-exclusive romantic relationship with Roan Montgomery for more than 20 years (see "Personality" below). Beckman also maintains a close friendship with Dr. Condoleezza Rice.

== Series ==
General Beckman first appeared in "Chuck Versus the Helicopter", replacing the National Intelligence Director (Wendy Makkena) as overseer of Operation Bartowski. Initially, Casey and Sarah were to protect Chuck only until the replacement Intersect was back online. Sarah and Chuck believed that once this occurred Chuck would be free to go back to his normal life; however Beckman secretly issued orders to Casey that Chuck was to be killed to prevent the government secrets he retained from falling into the wrong hands. However, after the destruction of the second Intersect this order was rescinded. Additionally, because Operation Bartowski was the only effective weapon against CIA splinter group Fulcrum, Beckman decided that Chuck was far too important and valuable a resource to be released. She therefore blocked his attempts to contact Orion and have the Intersect removed. Beckman has also made it clear that if Chuck is ever identified, he will be taken into protective custody.

Beckman's primary role on the series is to provide "Team Bartowski" with intelligence updates on Chuck's flashes and assign their mission objectives. Most of the time these missions are the result of something Chuck flashes on in the course of his normal day. However, on several occasions Beckman has issued an assignment of her own devising based on events elsewhere, to which Chuck's abilities as the Intersect are particularly well-suited. Beckman herself is seldom personally involved on these assignments and allows the team to proceed on their own. However, in "Chuck Versus the Crown Vic" she benched the team when a flash by Chuck went bad, and ordered Casey locked down when his personal vendetta against his former mentor botched a mission. Beckman personally involved herself when Chuck was contacted by Orion after a rogue search and flew to Burbank to debrief the team. This was the first time since the pilot episode that one of the team's supervisors met with them in-person, and also the first time they were directly involved in that episode's mission.

General Beckman typically declines to interfere directly with the team's dynamics. However Sarah's confrontational attitude towards her treatment of Chuck in "Chuck Versus the Predator" led to her concern that Sarah was too emotionally close to the asset. After Casey attempted to cover for them, she requested he provide an unedited report on Chuck and Sarah's relationship. This led to her reassigning CIA agent Alexandra Forrest as Chuck's CIA handler under directive 49-B. After Forrest subsequently failed to protect Chuck because she lacked Sarah's close personal connection and understanding of him, Beckman was forced to acknowledge that Sarah's feelings for the asset made her the best choice to protect him.

After Chuck's failed operation to locate his father, and he allowed Jill to escape, Beckman decided to pull the plug on Operation Bartowski and ordered Casey and Sarah to take Chuck into permanent custody. She reversed this decision when the Intersect was removed from Chuck's head in "Chuck Versus the Colonel". In "Chuck Versus the Ring" she offered Chuck an analyst position on the Intersect Project. She then freed Casey to return to his old unit, and reassigned Sarah to the Intersect Project with Bryce Larkin.

Rounding out Beckman's interference with the team, she ordered Sarah to apprehend Casey upon learning that he had stolen a valuable item from a CIA facility, and when Casey was broken out, she came to Castle and ordered Sarah and Chuck to capture him, dead or alive. Despite the three agents eventually working together and taking down the Ring cell that had coerced him into stealing from the CIA in the first place, Beckman could not brook Casey's treason, and dismissed him on the spot. Beckman also wished to discuss Sarah transferring out of Burbank, as Chuck has needed her less and less.

Beckman does not look lightly on the three years and "untold millions of dollars" spent helping Chuck reach his potential, but has become understanding of Chuck's "hand-wringing" and "second-guessing" as part of his process. Beckman insists that until seeing video recovered from the Ring, she had no knowledge that Sarah had killed Shaw's wife.

In the season 3 finale, Beckman is before the higher ups of the CIA, who were concerned about the state of Operation Bartowski and Chuck in particular. She gets swept away in a setup staged by a very much alive Shaw. The purpose was to discredit her so that he could take her place at the spies' convention, where the Five Elders of the Ring were going to be to take over the NSA and CIA. Team Bartowski arrests the Elders along with Daniel Shaw and Justin Sullivan, leading to the disintegration of the Ring. Chuck later reveals to Ellie that Beckman was reinstated, and she allowed him to resign from the spy world.

As of the season 4 premier, the federal government has rebuilt the Burbank Buy More as a secret joint NSA/CIA station, staffed by undercover spies. Beckman initially installs herself on-site in the guise of a Buy More manager, using Big Mike's old office and displaying her real forename or middle name, Diane, on her name tag (although she incongruously prefers her personnel to continue to address her as "General" even when undercover in the store). She has withdrawn her approval of Chuck's resignation, and systematically eliminates all private sector job opportunities in order to force his return to the CIA and Buy More. New "improvements" to the Buy More include a trap door through which she drops a reluctant Chuck through a Bespin-esque tube slide into Castle. After rehiring Morgan Grimes as a "green shirter" salesman upstairs and an operative downstairs, Beckman reluctantly concedes to his observation that the Buy More and its undercover staff are far too efficient and pleasant, rendering the cover virtually transparent; accordingly, she authorizes Morgan to rehire the store's former staff and appoints him store manager in her stead.

General Beckman is the series' only regular character not based in the San Fernando Valley, and is usually seen only in video conferences from her office. Still, her on-site management of the Buy More's reconstruction is not the only time she has been shown away from her Fort Meade desk. She was in the field in two consecutive episodes, supervising the arrest of Alexei Volkoff at the Bartowski family's forest cabin, and subsequently participating in the capture of Fatima Tazi and rescue of Roan Montgomery in Marrakesh, Morocco. In the latter case, she called in an air strike on Tazi's counterfeiting presses and personally employed a rocket-propelled grenade to disable Tazi and prevent Montgomery's execution. Noticeably, the general dresses in her usual service uniform even in the field while her subordinate military personnel are in fatigue uniform. She also occasionally visits Team Bartowski in Burbank, particularly in season 4.

Although her position prevents her from doing so openly, Beckman ultimately proves her loyalty to her team in "Chuck Versus the Cliffhanger" when, after Chuck and Casey are "burned" by Clyde Decker for their attempt to free Alexei Volkoff and save Sarah's life, Beckman provides them with the information on where Volkoff is being taken and her own identity card to enter Castle. She also supposedly left Chuck a pair of sunglasses with the intent of restoring the Intersect to him after it was suppressed by Decker, however they were accidentally put on by Morgan first. She is, however, noticeably absent from Chuck and Sarah's wedding.

As of the end of season 4, the government has concluded Operation Bartowski, stripped Castle of its equipment, and sold off the Buy More/Castle complex. Concurrently, Beckman terminated the civil service employment of Chuck, Sarah and Morgan (although all three were employed by the CIA, not by her NSA), and arranged either a retirement or second dismissal of Casey from the Marine Corps. Beckman's involvement with Chuck and the Intersect Project appeared not to have concluded, as the Intersect-embedded sunglasses meant for Chuck were addressed as a gift from Beckman. In "Chuck Versus the Frosted Tips", Beckman came to Chuck to hire Carmichael Industries to help capture a man named Zorn to prevent him from selling CIA secrets. Later, Sarah calls Beckman regarding the Intersect glasses, only to learn that she had never sent any glasses; it is implied that Clyde Decker was responsible. At the end of the episode, Beckman clandestinely meets with Chuck, warning him that since Morgan has outed himself as the Intersect, Decker has put a kill order on him. Subsequently, after Morgan was hidden at Castle, Beckman arrived to remove the Intersect before going to call off the kill order. Unfortunately, all but one assassins had been called off, which Decker announced was the Viper. When Team Bartowski catches the Viper, Beckman and Decker tell her that the hit is off.

In "Chuck Versus the Curse", Beckman calls the team to officially condemn them for treason with the death of Decker and stealing the Omen virus, when she was tapping a Morse code for the team to flee. She later rendezvoused with Casey at an abandoned bar, as well as sending an agent to escort the Woodcombs. Unfortunately, the Woodcombs assumed Beckman's agent was hostile and fled, only to be captured by rogue agent Robyn Cunnings. Chuck brashly gives himself and the virus up to save his family before Casey and Sarah are able to arrest Cunnings. Afterwards, Casey and Beckman interrogated Cunnings, threatening to use her own torture device against her, confirming that there is a conspiracy in the CIA. She then has Team Bartowski cleared of the charge of treason, as well as Casey's criminal record. However, Cunnings had already released the Omen virus, which in turn, released Shaw, who was the mastermind behind Decker's team's rogue actions. As Shaw was holding Sarah hostage, Beckman was forced to help Chuck infiltrate the CIA to retrieve the Macau device from Decker's office (during the mission, she was forced to kiss Chuck, dressed as Santa, to throw off suspicions). As soon as Shaw was defeated and suppressed of the Ring Intersect, Beckman agrees to use government funds to help her team enjoy Christmas.

Team Bartowski ultimately had one last enemy named Nicholas Quinn, an ex-CIA agent who was supposed to receive the original Intersect. He kidnapped Sarah, who had uploaded the same infected Intersect Morgan had, and brainwashed her into doing her bidding. Beckman tried her best to help her team, but not before Quinn escaped with the Intersect glasses. However, he could not use the Intersect without it damaging his brain, so he sought out pieces of the Key, a device that could alter the Intersect. Beckman was unaware that she held a piece and unexpectedly taken hostage while attending a concert with her Chinese counterpart. Quinn had placed a bomb beneath her seat, set to go off when the music ended. Luckily, Jeff and Lester were able to delay the explosion, before Chuck is forced to upload the perfected Intersect to save Beckman. Beckman commended her former team for their work and offered to employ them again if they wish it.

== Personality ==
Beckman is portrayed as a stern woman with little tolerance for confrontation from subordinates. She is abrupt and to the point, and shows little to no interest in Chuck's life beyond his service as the Intersect. Beckman frequently overrules both Chuck and Sarah's objections to placing him in situations that put him in danger or compromise his personal life and ethics. She firmly believes that they are at war with Fulcrum, and they must use whatever weapons in their arsenal to defeat them. As Operation Bartowski is their only successful asset in this fight, she refuses to allow Chuck to have the Intersect removed and demands he become a spy. Beckman's wryness has led actress Bonita Friedericy to name her "Chuckles" Beckman.

She frequently lies to or withholds information from members of Team Bartowski, mostly Chuck, in the interest of national security. When the Beta Intersect was completed, she and Graham released Chuck of his obligations to the CIA and NSA, but, immediately after, ordered Casey to eliminate him, an order that was hinted at several times in the first season. Beckman has lied often on the subject of Orion, solely for the purpose of keeping the Intersect in Chuck's head and forcing him to become a spy. She later ordered Sarah to betray Chuck so that Chuck could be taken underground against his will. Further, she rescinded Chuck's resignation at the end of Season 3; despite Chuck saving her life and career, with Operation Bartowski declared an unmitigated success Beckman sabotages all attempts Chuck made to gain employment outside the CIA, declaring that Chuck is only out when she says so. She later insists that Chuck's sister Ellie Woodcomb be involuntarily used to provide the government with intel on the Intersect, as Orion's laptop seems to be configured to allow only her to have access to the program, over the objections of the team.

Little is shown of the General's personal life. She is known to be friends with Dr. Condoleezza Rice. Beckman is one of two concurrent NBC fictional characters - the other being Jack Donaghy of 30 Rock - to be friends of the former Secretary of State.

The first episode to explore Beckman's past or relationships in any detail was the season four episode, "Chuck Versus the Seduction Impossible". The episode confirmed that she and Roan Montgomery (John Laroquette) have maintained an ongoing romantic relationship of sorts for more than twenty years, enjoying periodic rendezvous. At the Fall of the Berlin Wall, the pair were engaged in a tryst and promised to retire with each other in or about 2009 if they both survived. She was subsequently angered when Montgomery went on a rogue operation rather than meet her as he promised. Although they are not in an ongoing committed relationship, per se, and although Montgomery's professional expertise is seduction and honey traps, Beckman does not entirely conceal her jealousy and resentment. Diane admitted that she too intended to cancel her plans to retire - both of them recognizing that they were too involved in their work to be comfortable settling down in a "normal" life. Beckman only had Montgomery tracked down because "you don't run from a general." Montgomery, NCS Director Jane Bentley, and Mary Bartowski are among the few characters with whom Diane is comfortable addressing her by her forename.

Beckman puts on a strongly professional attitude when dealing with the team, so she rarely shows signs of emotion. She was caught off-guard by Chuck's announcement that Orion had identified and contacted him. She was also, to humorous effect, flustered by Montgomery's charms after he aided the team in recovering the Cipher. When asked by Chuck if she had a life outside of the NSA she reassured Casey, who objected to his question, that she wasn't bothered and admitted that she wasn't just a uniform, and "Chuck Versus the Angel de la Muerte" was the first time she was shown out of uniform (having been interrupted during a cocktail party). Beckman is also highly driven and tenacious, having tracked Orion for years, and shows wounded pride and shock that Chuck succeeded in finding him after only a few weeks. She was deeply angered by Chuck's insistence of being freed of the Intersect, and has taken the fight against Fulcrum personally due to the increasing number of men and women she's sent to their deaths trying to defeat them, and sees Chuck and his team as the only group to have found "a chink in their armor", and that the outcome was going to "rest squarely on [Chuck's] shoulders".

Although generally unflappable, Beckman was openly upset when she pleaded with Daniel Shaw to be allowed to disclose the full details of the team's recently completed mission with Carina in "Chuck Versus the Three Words". Despite her professionalism in front of her subordinates she has also at times displayed genuine sympathy and concern for the well-being of the team, and was visibly concerned by the realization that Shaw's knowledge of Sarah killing his wife placed Sarah in danger.

Beckman is known to be a reader of Ayn Rand.

As she is a strict professional, Beckman officially does not approve of Chuck and Sarah beginning a romantic relationship. However off the record even she has acknowledged "it's about damn time." Beckman herself openly admitted to caring for Chuck in "Chuck Versus the Tooth", when it became apparent the Intersect was taking a devastating effect on Chuck's mental state.

Like Col. Casey, BG Beckman has begrudgingly grown to appreciate Morgan Grimes' unusual talents and his importance in keeping the intersect (i.e., Chuck's mind) functioning properly. Although she initially hired him only under duress as a condition of Casey's delivery of the Ring Director, she demanded his involuntary reinstatement after his resignation only months later, and almost immediately appointed him manager of the Buy More in recognition of his knowledge and understanding of how to keep the cover store's appearance genuine. Morgan is the only regular character shown to address her by her forename, Diane, or "my captain", although he corrected himself each time in response to her displeasure.

== Awards ==
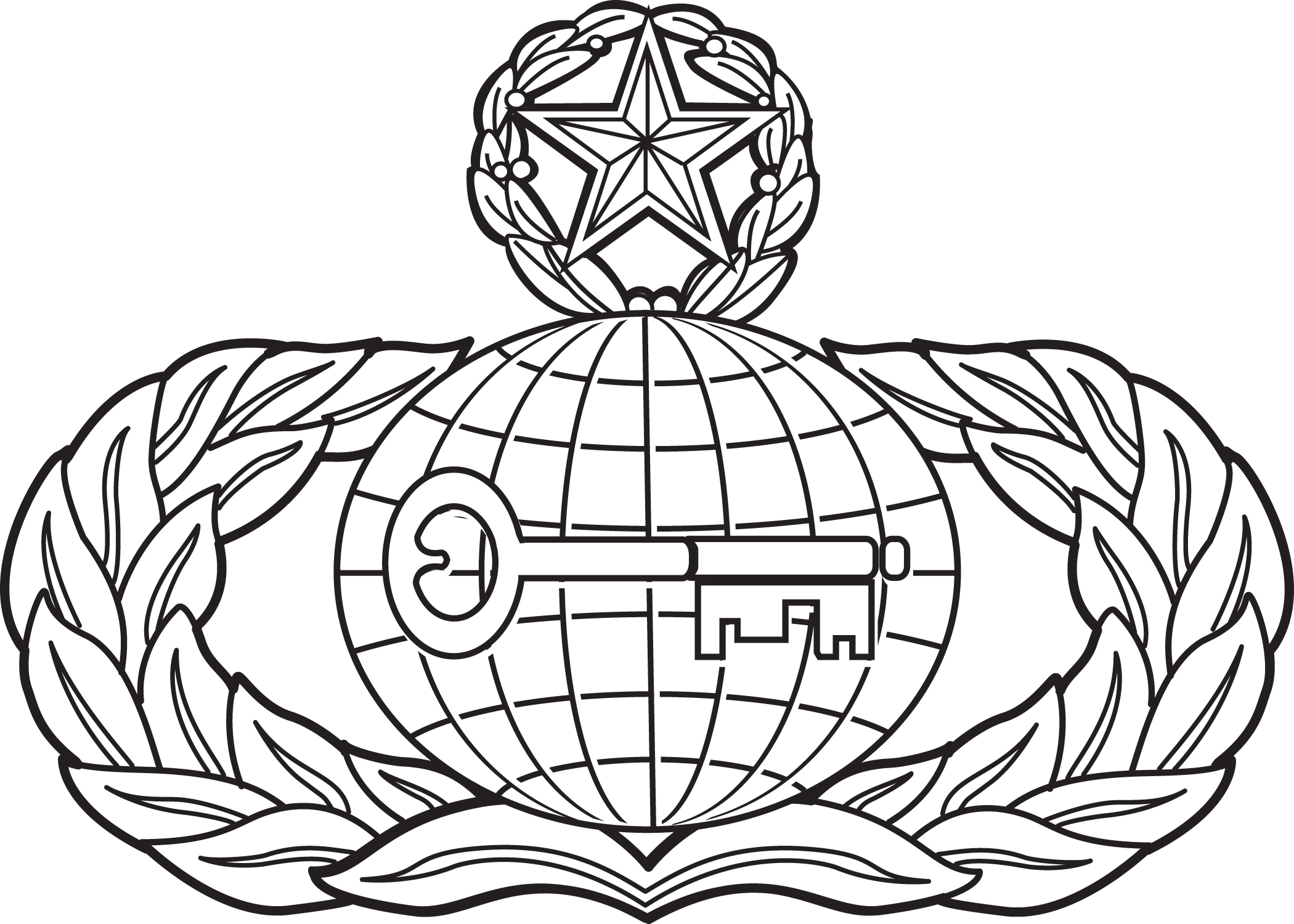

Air Force Master Intelligence Badge (erroneously worn inverted in many episodes)
Air Force Cross	Air Force Distinguished Service Medal	Defense Superior Service Medal
Legion of Merit	Distinguished Flying Cross	Bronze Star with Valor device
Defense Meritorious Service Medal	Meritorious Service Medal	Outstanding Unit Award
Air Force Recognition Ribbon	National Defense Service Medal with two service stars indicating 3 awards	Armed Forces Expeditionary Medal
Southwest Asia Service Medal with two campaign stars	Humanitarian Service Medal	Kuwait Liberation Medal (Saudi Arabia)
Kuwait Liberation Medal (Kuwait)	Global War on Terrorism Expeditionary Medal	Global War on Terrorism Service Medal (Note: This ribbon secretly contained a part of the Intersect Key that was inserted/planted by Steven Bartowski, unknown to Beckman herself.)

Close-ups of Ms. Friedericy's costume are available at, and in the infobox above. Several of the ribbons are out of sequence, but are shown here in the order worn by the character. For example, the Kuwait Liberation Medals from Saudi Arabia and Kuwait, being foreign awards, should follow all United States awards, not precede the GWOTEM and GWOTSM.

The two stars on her Southwest Asia Service Medal show that she served in two of the five distinct campaigns of the Gulf War.

General Beckman's three awards of the National Defense Service Medal evidence that she first entered the military prior to August 14, 1974, as the three most recent periods of service for which the medal was issued are for the Vietnam War (January 1, 1961 - August 14, 1974), the Gulf War (August 2, 1990 - November 30, 1995) and the War on Terrorism (September 11, 2001 - ).

== Director of National Intelligence ==
Wendy Makkena as the National Intelligence Director.

In "Chuck Versus the Intersect" actress Wendy Makkena appeared in a role credited as the National Intelligence Director. In some casting lists the character is identified as "General Mary Beckman". In the episode, the Intelligence Director briefed Casey alongside Director Graham on the Intersect theft, before dispatching him to Burbank to track down Bryce Larkin's contact.

Makkena was to continue appearing in this role, however was forced to drop out for unspecified reasons after the pilot was filmed. Bonita Friedericy also auditioned for the role, and took over when Makkena left. Although the Intelligence Director's name was never used in the pilot, and Schwartz and Fedak have not officially confirmed it, Friedericy has suggested the two characters are the same. General Beckman's ID card reads "Gen. M. Beckman" (as shown on Chuck's Chart, first seen in the second-season episode "Chuck Versus the Lethal Weapon"), which matches the unofficial name of Makkena's character in the pilot. This is further compounded by the original pilot script, in which a "General Mary Beckman" is seen speaking with Director Graham. The video conference screen shown immediately before and after conferences with Beckman displays a large seal (essentially the U.S. Coat of Arms with the crest replaced by a globe ringed with satellites) around which are the words "Office of the Director of National Intelligence - United States of America", also suggesting the characters are the same.
