= List of Chuck episodes =

Chuck is an American spy action-comedy-drama television series created by Josh Schwartz and Chris Fedak. It premiered on the terrestrial television network NBC on September 24, 2007, airing on Mondays at 8:00 pm ET. Chuck centers on Chuck Bartowski (played by Zachary Levi), an "average computer-whiz-next-door", who receives an encoded e-mail from an old college friend now working in the CIA; the message embeds the only remaining copy of the world's greatest spy secrets into Chuck's brain. The first season of Chuck aired in 2007–08, containing 13 episodes. After the 2007–08 Writers Guild of America strike, NBC renewed Chuck for a second season instead of extending the first to a full season of 22 episodes. The full-length second season originally aired in 2008–09. Episodes of Chuck are also available in various new media formats. The first through fifth seasons are available to purchase on DVD and Blu-ray. In the United States, United Kingdom and Canada, every episode is available for download from iTunes. Episode titles for Chuck are consistently formatted as "Chuck Versus...". For example, the pilot episode is titled "Chuck Versus the Intersect". This list is ordered by the episodes' original air date and not by the production codes, which show the order in which episodes were filmed.

On May 13, 2011, NBC renewed Chuck for a fifth and final season consisting of 13 episodes, which premiered on October 28, 2011. During the course of the series, 91 episodes of Chuck aired, between September 24, 2007, and January 27, 2012.

== Series overview ==
Season	Episodes	Originally released	
Season	Episodes	First released	Last released
1	13	September 24, 2007	January 24, 2008
2	22	September 29, 2008	April 27, 2009
3	19	January 10, 2010	May 24, 2010
4	24	September 20, 2010	May 16, 2011
5	13	October 28, 2011	January 27, 2012

== Episodes ==
=== Season 1 (2007–08) ===
No. overall	No. in season	Title	Directed by	Written by	Original release date	Prod. code	US viewers (millions)
1	1	"Chuck Versus the Intersect"	McG	Josh Schwartz & Chris Fedak	September 24, 2007	276025	9.21
2	2	"Chuck Versus the Helicopter"	Robert Duncan McNeill	Josh Schwartz & Chris Fedak	October 1, 2007	3T6451	8.39
3	3	"Chuck Versus the Tango"	Jason Ensler	Matthew Miller	October 8, 2007	3T6452	7.21
4	4	"Chuck Versus the Wookiee"	Allan Kroeker	Allison Adler	October 15, 2007	3T6454	8.36
5	5	"Chuck Versus the Sizzling Shrimp"	David Solomon	Scott Rosenbaum	October 22, 2007	3T6453	7.22
6	6	"Chuck Versus the Sandworm"	Robert Duncan McNeill	Phil Klemmer	October 29, 2007	3T6455	7.65
7	7	"Chuck Versus the Alma Mater"	Patrick Norris	Anne Cofell Saunders	November 5, 2007	3T6456	7.65
8	8	"Chuck Versus the Truth"	Robert Duncan McNeill	Allison Adler	November 12, 2007	3T6457	7.56
9	9	"Chuck Versus the Imported Hard Salami"	Jason Ensler	Scott Rosenbaum & Matthew Miller	November 19, 2007	3T6458	7.79
10	10	"Chuck Versus the Nemesis"	Allison Liddi-Brown	Chris Fedak	November 26, 2007	3T6459	8.42
11	11	"Chuck Versus the Crown Vic"	Chris Fisher	Zev Borow	December 3, 2007	3T6460	8.41
12	12	"Chuck Versus the Undercover Lover"	Fred Toye	Phil Klemmer	January 24, 2008	3T6461	6.88
13	13	"Chuck Versus the Marlin"	Allan Kroeker	Matthew Lau	January 24, 2008	3T6462	7.02

=== Season 2 (2008–09) ===
No. overall	No. in season	Title	Directed by	Written by	Original release date	Prod. code	US viewers (millions)
14	1	"Chuck Versus the First Date"	Jason Ensler	Josh Schwartz & Chris Fedak	September 29, 2008	3T7251	6.84
15	2	"Chuck Versus the Seduction"	Allan Kroeker	Matthew Miller	October 6, 2008	3T7252	5.83
16	3	"Chuck Versus the Break-Up"	Robert Duncan McNeill	Scott Rosenbaum	October 13, 2008	3T7253	6.17
17	4	"Chuck Versus the Cougars"	Patrick Norris	Allison Adler	October 20, 2008	3T7254	6.87
18	5	"Chuck Versus Tom Sawyer"	Norman Buckley	Phil Klemmer	October 27, 2008	3T7255	6.70
19	6	"Chuck Versus the Ex"	Jay Chandrasekhar	Zev Borow	November 10, 2008	3T7256	6.34
20	7	"Chuck Versus the Fat Lady"	Jeffrey G. Hunt	Matthew Lau	November 17, 2008	3T7257	6.89
21	8	"Chuck Versus the Gravitron"	Allison Liddi-Brown	Chris Fedak	November 24, 2008	3T7258	6.53
22	9	"Chuck Versus the Sensei"	Jonas Pate	Anne Cofell Saunders	December 1, 2008	3T7259	7.34
23	10	"Chuck Versus the DeLorean"	Ken Whittingham	Matthew Miller	December 8, 2008	3T7260	6.94
24	11	"Chuck Versus Santa Claus"	Robert Duncan McNeill	Scott Rosenbaum	December 15, 2008	3T7261	7.66
25	12	"Chuck Versus the Third Dimension" (Note: "Chuck Versus the Third Dimension" originally aired in 3-D, as the name suggests, using the same ColorCode 3-D technology as some of the commercials in Super Bowl XLIII.)	Robert Duncan McNeill	Chris Fedak	February 2, 2009	3T7263	8.45
26	13	"Chuck Versus the Suburbs" (Note: "Chuck Versus the Suburbs" was supposed to air after "Chuck Versus the Best Friend". The airing order was swapped in the U.S. due to the show being preempted for the Presidential speech, and since "Suburbs" has a Valentine's day theme, it was aired on the week of Valentine's day.)	Jay Chandrasekhar	Phil Klemmer	February 16, 2009	3T7264	6.84
27	14	"Chuck Versus the Best Friend"	Peter Lauer	Allison Adler	February 23, 2009	3T7262	6.59
28	15	"Chuck Versus the Beefcake"	Patrick Norris	Matthew Miller & Scott Rosenbaum	March 2, 2009	3T7265	6.66
29	16	"Chuck Versus the Lethal Weapon"	Allan Kroeker	Zev Borow & Matthew Lau	March 9, 2009	3T7266	5.80
30	17	"Chuck Versus the Predator"	Jeremiah Chechik	Chris Fedak	March 23, 2009	3T7268	6.16
31	18	"Chuck Versus the Broken Heart"	Kevin Bray	Allison Adler	March 30, 2009	3T7267	5.72
32	19	"Chuck Versus the Dream Job"	Robert Duncan McNeill	Phil Klemmer & Corey Nickerson	April 6, 2009	3T7269	6.10
33	20	"Chuck Versus the First Kill"	Norman Buckley	Scott Rosenbaum	April 13, 2009	3T7270	6.21
34	21	"Chuck Versus the Colonel"	Peter Lauer	Matthew Miller	April 20, 2009	3T7271	6.11
35	22	"Chuck Versus the Ring"	Robert Duncan McNeill	Chris Fedak & Allison Adler	April 27, 2009	3T7272	6.20

=== Season 3 (2010) ===
No. overall	No. in season	Title	Directed by	Written by	Original release date	Prod. code	US viewers (millions)
36	1	"Chuck Versus the Pink Slip"	Robert Duncan McNeill	Chris Fedak & Matt Miller	January 10, 2010	3X5801	7.70
37	2	"Chuck Versus the Three Words"	Peter Lauer	Allison Adler & Scott Rosenbaum	January 10, 2010	3X5802	7.20
38	3	"Chuck Versus the Angel de la Muerte"	Jeremiah Chechik	Phil Klemmer	January 11, 2010	3X5803	7.36
39	4	"Chuck Versus Operation Awesome"	Robert Duncan McNeill	Zev Borow	January 18, 2010	3X5804	6.65
40	5	"Chuck Versus First Class"	Fred Toye	Chris Fedak	January 25, 2010	3X5805	6.98
41	6	"Chuck Versus the Nacho Sampler"	Allan Kroeker	Matt Miller & Scott Rosenbaum	February 1, 2010	3X5806	6.73
42	7	"Chuck Versus the Mask"	Michael Schultz	Phil Klemmer	February 8, 2010	3X5807	6.60
43	8	"Chuck Versus the Fake Name"	Jeremiah Chechik	Allison Adler	March 1, 2010	3X5808	6.70
44	9	"Chuck Versus the Beard"	Zachary Levi	Scott Rosenbaum	March 8, 2010	3X5809	6.37
45	10	"Chuck Versus the Tic Tac"	Patrick Norris	Rafe Judkins & Lauren LeFranc	March 15, 2010	3X5810	5.85
46	11	"Chuck Versus the Final Exam"	Robert Duncan McNeill	Zev Borow	March 22, 2010	3X5811	5.46
47	12	"Chuck Versus the American Hero"	Jeremiah Chechik	Story by : Max Denby; Teleplay by : Matt Miller & Phil Klemmer	March 29, 2010	3X5812	5.68
48	13	"Chuck Versus the Other Guy"	Peter Lauer	Chris Fedak	April 5, 2010	3X5813	5.79
49	14	"Chuck Versus the Honeymooners"	Robert Duncan McNeill	Story by : Allison Adler; Teleplay by : Rafe Judkins & Lauren LeFranc	April 26, 2010	3X5814	5.78
50	15	"Chuck Versus the Role Models"	Fred Toye	Phil Klemmer	May 3, 2010	3X5815	5.35
51	16	"Chuck Versus the Tooth"	Daisy von Scherler Mayer	Zev Borow & Max Denby	May 10, 2010	3X5816	5.33
52	17	"Chuck Versus the Living Dead"	Jay Chandrasekhar	Lauren LeFranc & Rafe Judkins	May 17, 2010	3X5817	5.20
53	18	"Chuck Versus the Subway"	Matt Shakman	Story by : Matt Miller; Teleplay by : Allison Adler & Phil Klemmer	May 24, 2010	3X5818	4.96
54	19	"Chuck Versus the Ring: Part II"	Robert Duncan McNeill	Josh Schwartz & Chris Fedak	May 24, 2010	3X5819	5.16

=== Season 4 (2010–11) ===
It was initially announced on May 14, 2010, that NBC renewed Chuck for a fourth season consisting of 13 episodes with an option for a back nine; on October 19, 2010, NBC ordered an additional eleven episodes (rather than the original option of nine), bringing the number of season four episodes to 24, the largest for the series.

No. overall	No. in season	Title	Directed by	Written by	Original release date	Prod. code	US viewers (millions)
55	1	"Chuck Versus the Anniversary"	Robert Duncan McNeill	Chris Fedak	September 20, 2010	3X6301	5.79
56	2	"Chuck Versus the Suitcase"	Gail Mancuso	Rafe Judkins & Lauren LeFranc	September 27, 2010	3X6302	5.37
57	3	"Chuck Versus the Cubic Z"	Norman Buckley	Nicholas Wootton	October 4, 2010	3X6303	5.38
58	4	"Chuck Versus the Coup d'Etat"	Robert Duncan McNeill	Kristin Newman	October 11, 2010	3X6304	5.33
59	5	"Chuck Versus the Couch Lock"	Michael Schultz	Henry Alonso Myers	October 18, 2010	3X6305	5.23
60	6	"Chuck Versus the Aisle of Terror"	John Scott	Craig DiGregorio	October 25, 2010	3X6306	5.45
61	7	"Chuck Versus the First Fight"	Allan Kroeker	Rafe Judkins & Lauren LeFranc	November 1, 2010	3X6307	5.47
62	8	"Chuck Versus the Fear of Death"	Robert Duncan McNeill	Nicholas Wootton	November 15, 2010	3X6308	5.43
63	9	"Chuck Versus Phase Three"	Anton Cropper	Kristin Newman	November 22, 2010	3X6309	4.80
64	10	"Chuck Versus the Leftovers"	Zachary Levi	Henry Alonso Myers	November 29, 2010	3X6310	6.17
65	11	"Chuck Versus the Balcony"	Jay Chandrasekhar	Max Denby	January 17, 2011	3X6311	5.97
66	12	"Chuck Versus the Gobbler"	Milan Cheylov	Craig DiGregorio	January 24, 2011	3X6312	6.06
67	13	"Chuck Versus the Push Mix"	Peter Lauer	Rafe Judkins & Lauren LeFranc	January 31, 2011	3X6313	5.57
68	14	"Chuck Versus the Seduction Impossible"	Patrick Norris	Chris Fedak & Kristin Newman	February 7, 2011	3X6314	5.41
69	15	"Chuck Versus the Cat Squad"	Paul Marks	Nicholas Wootton	February 14, 2011	3X6315	5.47
70	16	"Chuck Versus the Masquerade"	Patrick Norris	Rafe Judkins & Lauren LeFranc	February 21, 2011	3X6316	5.48
71	17	"Chuck Versus the First Bank of Evil"	Frederick E.O. Toye	Henry Alonso Myers & Craig DiGregorio	February 28, 2011	3X6317	5.35
72	18	"Chuck Versus the A-Team"	Kevin Mock	Phil Klemmer	March 14, 2011	3X6318	4.92
73	19	"Chuck Versus the Muuurder"	Allan Kroeker	Alex Katsnelson & Kristin Newman	March 21, 2011	3X6319	4.23
74	20	"Chuck Versus the Family Volkoff"	Robert Duncan McNeill	Amanda Kate Shuman & Nicholas Wootton	April 11, 2011	3X6320	4.03
75	21	"Chuck Versus the Wedding Planner"	Anton Cropper	Rafe Judkins & Lauren LeFranc	April 18, 2011	3X6321	4.22
76	22	"Chuck Versus Agent X"	Robert Duncan McNeill	Phil Klemmer & Craig DiGregorio	May 2, 2011	3X6322	4.10
77	23	"Chuck Versus the Last Details"	Peter Lauer	Henry Alonso Myers & Kristin Newman	May 9, 2011	3X6323	4.10
78	24	"Chuck Versus the Cliffhanger"	Robert Duncan McNeil	Chris Fedak & Nicholas Wootton	May 16, 2011	3X6324	4.53

=== Season 5 (2011–12) ===
NBC confirmed that the fifth and final season of Chuck would consist of thirteen episodes on May 13, 2011, returning in the fall on Friday nights at 8/7c; the season aired from October 28, 2011, to January 27, 2012.

No. overall	No. in season	Title	Directed by	Written by	Original release date	Prod. code	US viewers (millions)
79	1	"Chuck Versus the Zoom"	Robert Duncan McNeill	Chris Fedak & Nicholas Wootton	October 28, 2011	3X6751	3.42
80	2	"Chuck Versus the Bearded Bandit"	Patrick Norris	Lauren LeFranc & Rafe Judkins	November 4, 2011	3X6752	3.08
81	3	"Chuck Versus the Frosted Tips"	Paul Marks	Phil Klemmer	November 11, 2011	3X6753	3.13
82	4	"Chuck Versus the Business Trip"	Allan Kroeker	Kristin Newman	November 18, 2011	3X6754	3.11
83	5	"Chuck Versus the Hack Off"	Zachary Levi	Craig DiGregorio	December 9, 2011	3X6755	3.66
84	6	"Chuck Versus the Curse"	Michael Schultz	Alex Katsnelson	December 16, 2011	3X6756	3.22
85	7	"Chuck Versus the Santa Suit"	Peter Lauer	Amanda Kate Shuman	December 23, 2011	3X6757	3.42
86	8	"Chuck Versus the Baby"	Matt Barber	Rafe Judkins & Lauren LeFranc	December 30, 2011	3X6758	3.18
87	9	"Chuck Versus the Kept Man"	Fred Toye	Craig DiGregorio & Phil Klemmer	January 6, 2012	3X6759	3.26
88	10	"Chuck Versus Bo"	Jeremiah Chechik	Kristin Newman	January 13, 2012	3X6760	3.17
89	11	"Chuck Versus the Bullet Train"	Buzz Feitshans IV	Nicholas Wootton	January 20, 2012	3X6761	3.84
90	12	"Chuck Versus Sarah"	Jay Chandrasekhar	Rafe Judkins & Lauren LeFranc	January 27, 2012	3X6762	4.10
91	13	"Chuck Versus the Goodbye"	Robert Duncan McNeill	Chris Fedak	January 27, 2012	3X6763	4.31

== Web-based spin-offs ==
=== Chuck Versus the Webisodes ===
#	Title	Original air date
1	"Buy More #15: Employee Health"	October 6, 2008
John Casey explains how to rid the Buy More of unwanted pests.
2	"Buy More #17: Leadership"	October 13, 2008
Even Big Mike knows that sometimes a manager has to look the other way.
3	"Buy More #7: Customer Service"	October 20, 2008
At the Nerd Herd service desk, not all occupational hazards are unwelcome.
4	"Buy More #24: Youth Marketing"	October 27, 2008
Young or old, loyal customers are created by great sales associates, like Morgan Grimes.
5	"Buy More #14: Work Ethic"	November 3, 2008
Emmett's secrets for Buy More career success: show up early and keep your eyes and ears open.

=== Meet the Nerd Herders ===
#	Title
1	"Nerd Herd Reviews: Heroes DVD"
Trapped in a cage and covered with meat sauce.
2	"Anna's Sword Skills"
The secret is all in the hair.
3	"Nerd Herd Reviews: Romantic Comedies"
Why be specific when they all pretty much blow?
4	"Nerd Herd Reviews: Avril Lavigne"
Hey, hey, you, you ... pinch yourself hard.
5	"Anna's Mad Skillz"
Watch out... Anna's got some serious karate moves.
6	"Meet Jeff"
Jeff tells something about himself...

=== Morgan's Vlog ===
#	Title
1	"Make a Movie End a Lot Quicker, Ep. 1"
Chuck's guide to breaking up on camera.
2	"Make a Movie End a Lot Quicker, Ep. 2"
Notting Hill in ten seconds or less.
3	"Make a Movie End a Lot Quicker, Ep. 3"
And now time for Smoking Aces, like it or not.
4	"Movie Villains"
A new and disturbing trend in movie villains.

=== Chuck Presents – Buy Hard: The Jeff and Lester Story ===
#	Title
1	"Episode 1"
Jeff and Lester adjust to living life on the lam.
2	"Episode 2"
Jeff and Lester arrive at the Encino Buy More for the release of Halo: Reach.
3	"Episode 3"
Along with Big Mike, Jeff and Lester come up with a plan to get the game.
4	"Episode 4"
Jeff, Lester and Big Mike infiltrate the Encino Buy More.
5	"Episode 5"
Jeff, Lester and Big Mike make their final attempt to get Halo: Reach.
