= Brian's Got a Brand New Bag =

- Family Guy episode
- Episode no.: Season 8 Episode 4
- Directed by: Pete Michels
- Written by: Tom Devanney
- Production code: 7ACX02
- Original air date: November 8, 2009

Guest appearances
- Hart Bochner; James Burkholder; Alexandra Breckenridge as Girl in Bar; Aimee Garcia; Paul Gleason as Dwayne T. Robinson (archive recording); Jack Samson; Stacey Scowley; Debra Skelton; Reginald VelJohnson as Al Powell (archive recording); Nana Visitor as Rita; Tico Wells; Mae Whitman; Bruce Willis as John McClane (archive recording)

Episode chronology
← Previous "Spies Reminiscent of Us"	Next → "Hannah Banana"
- Family Guy season 8

"Brian's Got a Brand New Bag" is the fourth episode of the eighth season of the animated comedy series Family Guy. It premiered on Fox in the United States on November 8, 2009. The episode follows anthropomorphic dog Brian as he dates a middle-aged woman named Rita whose daughter has stood Brian up. He becomes reluctant to continue their relationship after discovering her numerous health concerns; also, his family continually harasses him. The episode premiered during an "all–Seth MacFarlane" schedule, preceding the live-action episode Seth and Alex's Almost Live Comedy Show.

The episode was written by series regular Tom Devanney and directed by Pete Michels. It received mixed reviews from critics for its storyline and many cultural references. According to Nielsen ratings, it was viewed in 7.38 million homes in its original airing. The episode featured guest performances by Hart Bochner, James Burkholder, Aimee Garcia, Paul Gleason, Jack Samson, Stacey Scowley, Debra Skelton, Reginald VelJohnson, Nana Visitor, Tico Wells, Mae Whitman, and Bruce Willis, along with several recurring guest voice actors for the series. "Brian's Got a Brand New Bag" was released on DVD along with seven other episodes from the season on June 15, 2010. The episode is dedicated to Patrick Swayze.

== Plot ==
During a DVD sale at a closing video store, Peter decides to buy Road House and, after watching it, starts roundhouse kicking everything in sight including his family. While driving with Brian and using his feet on the steering wheel, Peter crashes into a young woman's car and Brian rushes to make sure she is all right. The woman apologizes to Brian and he asks her out. She accepts, but when he comes to her house to pick her up, her mother Rita says she has just left with somebody else. Brian keeps talking to Rita and finds himself attracted to her. After dating for several weeks, they sneak into the Griffin home late one night, but the family finds out the next morning and ridicules Rita behind her back. Brian attempts to convince the family that Rita is a wonderful, charming woman even if she is significantly older than he is, and invites her to dinner to prove his point. It does not go well: they demand that she reveal her age, and she breaks down and admits that she is 50. Infuriated with the Griffins, Brian goes to console Rita, and proposes to her. Feeling guilty for how they treated him, the Griffins give Brian their blessings.

Rita breaks her hip while she and Brian are having sex. Peter warns Brian that their relationship will not last much longer now that he must care for her. Brian goes out to pick up medicine for bedridden Rita, but is distracted by the sight of a group of young women entering a bar. One of them offers to have sex with Brian in the bathroom, which he accepts. When Brian finally returns to Rita with the medicine, he realizes that he still loves her and admits his infidelity. However, Rita decides he is far too young for her and breaks off their engagement, which a regretful Brian understands is for the best.

== Production and development ==
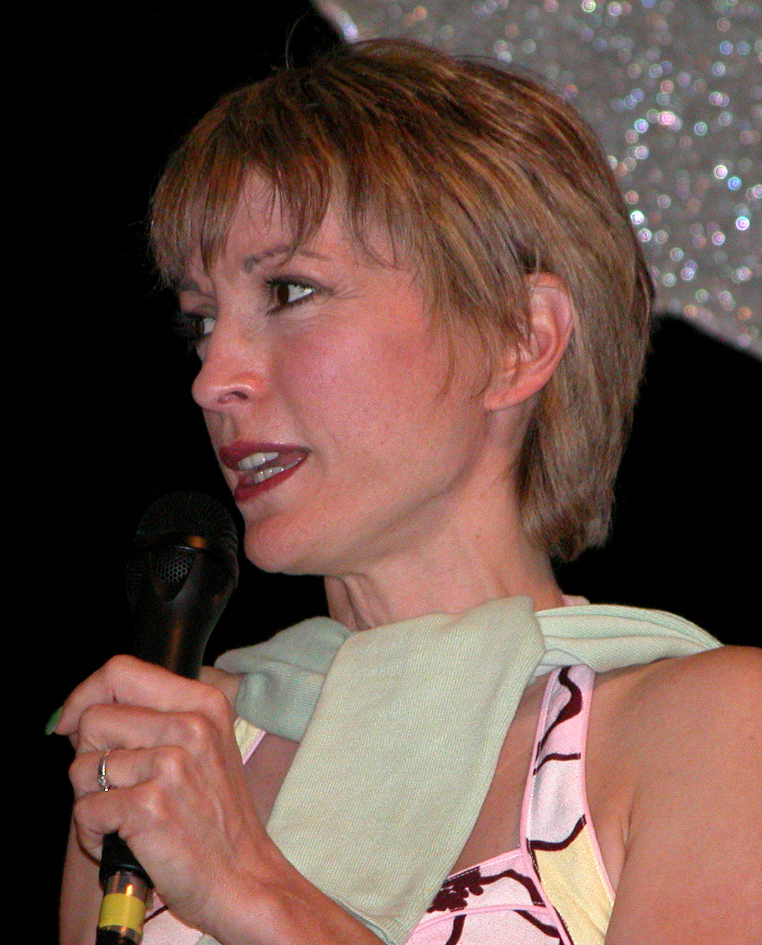
Nana Visitor provided the voice of Rita.

The episode was directed by former Simpsons artist Pete Michels, and written by Tom Devanney, shortly after the conclusion of the seventh production season. Both are series regulars for the show, who joined in its third and fourth seasons, respectively. Prior to providing minor voice-over roles for the series, actress Nana Visitor portrays the episode's featured character, Rita. Series regulars Peter Shin and James Purdum served as supervising directors, with series creator and executive producer Seth MacFarlane and David Zuckerman serving as staff writers for the episode.

"Brian's Got a Brand New Bag", along with the seven other episodes from Family Guy's eighth season, were released on a three-disc DVD set in the United States on June 15, 2010. The sets included brief audio commentaries by Seth MacFarlane and various crew and cast members for several episodes, a collection of deleted scenes, a special mini-feature which discussed the process behind animating "Road to the Multiverse", and mini-feature entitled Family Guy Karaoke.

In addition to Visitor and the regular cast, actor Hart Bochner, James Burkholder, actress Aimee Garcia, Paul Gleason, Jack Samson, actress Stacey Scowley, Debra Skelton, Reginald VelJohnson, actor Tico Wells, actress Mae Whitman, and actor Bruce Willis guest-starred in the episode in both voice and live-action appearances. Recurring guest voice actors Alexandra Breckenridge, writer Steve Callaghan, voice actor Ralph Garman, writer Danny Smith, writer Alec Sulkin, and writer John Viener also made minor appearances. Recurring guest cast members Adam West and Patrick Warburton also made appearances in the episode.

== Reception ==
In a significant decline from the previous week's show, and despite being heavily promoted as an "all-Seth MacFarlane" night, the episode received a Nielsen Rating of 4.3/7 in the 18–49 demographic, and was viewed in 7.38 million homes.

The episode received mostly mixed reviews from critics. Ahsan Haque of IGN gave it a 6.5/10, saying that the "episode felt very formulaic and a bit of a wasted opportunity" Emily VanDerWerff from The A.V. Club gave it a B, saying, "it's weird to see a Family Guy episode that has something approaching an actual story [...] and even the cutaway gags were more muted than usual." In a subsequent review of Family Guy's eighth season, Ramsey Isler of IGN listed "Brian's Got a Brand New Bag" as "remarkably unfunny, with lazy and unoriginal writing."
