= Chuck Versus the Wedding Planner =

- Chuck episode
- Episode no.: Season 4 Episode 21
- Directed by: Anton Cropper
- Written by: Rafe Judkins; Lauren LeFranc
- Production code: 3X6321
- Original air date: April 18, 2011

Guest appearances
- Gary Cole as Jack Burton; Mekenna Melvin as Alex McHugh; Clare Carey as Kathleen McHugh; Lisa LoCicero as Daphne Peralta; Pamela Roylance as Sarah's grandmother; Timothy V. Murphy as the Klug's father; Alexa Blair as Young Sarah Walker; George Ketsios as Paulie Klug; Kevin Makely as Bruno Klug; Gianna Simone as Ms. Gehrlich; Thom Williams as Franz Klug

Episode chronology
← Previous "Chuck Versus the Family Volkoff"	Next → "Chuck Versus Agent X"
- Chuck season 4

"Chuck Versus the Wedding Planner" is the 21st episode of the fourth season of the American action-comedy television series Chuck, and the 75th overall episode of the series. The episode was written by Rafe Judkins and Lauren LeFranc and directed by Anton Cropper. It originally aired on April 18, 2011.

In the episode, Chuck Bartowski (Zachary Levi) and Sarah Walker (Yvonne Strahovski) get conned out of their wedding money, and there is only one man they can turn to for help – Sarah's conman father, Jack Burton (Gary Cole). Meanwhile, Morgan Grimes (Joshua Gomez) and Alex McHugh (Mekenna Melvin) pressure John Casey (Adam Baldwin) to face Alex's mother, Kathleen (Clare Carey).

"Chuck Versus the Wedding Planner" received positive reviews from critics. According to the Nielsen ratings system, it drew 4.219 million viewers, with a 2.5/4 share among all households and 1.3/4 share among those aged 18–49.

== Plot ==
In 1988 McCall, Idaho, Sarah Walker (Alexa Blair) assists her father Jack Burton (Gary Cole) with a number of confidence tricks. Sarah begins saving her earnings in a piggy bank to go on an adventure with her father. When Sarah's grandmother (Pamela Roylance) forces Jack to leave Sarah, Sarah sneaks into his car. Jack returns Sarah to her bed after she has fallen asleep, taking the piggy bank with him.

In modern-day Burbank, California, Sarah (Yvonne Strahovski) and Chuck Bartowski (Zachary Levi) pay their wedding planner, Daphne Peralta (Lisa LoCicero), only to learn that Daphne has "conned" them. Advised by Jack to use their government resources, Chuck pretends to "flash" on Daphne, linking her to a known terrorist and causing General Diane Beckman (Bonita Friedericy) to redirect government resources to finding Daphne. After Daphne is captured, Sarah and Chuck reveal the truth and are suspended. However, when reading the plans for the Gerlich wedding, Chuck flashes on the names of Franz (Thom Williams), Bruno (Kevin Makely), and Paulie Klüg (George Ketsios), Hungarian scientists in the possession of Iranian nuclear research on a portable device called the "Zephyr", which one of the brothers is always carrying. All three brothers will be at their sister's wedding reception in Los Angeles. Beckman, however, does not believe him and refuses to grant them government resources.

Chuck and Sarah turn to Jack to help them continue Daphne's con and capture the Zephyr. They manage to lead the Klügs away from the reception and incapacitate them, only to find that none of them has the Zephyr. Jack realizes that the Klügs have been performing a shell game: the government has been pursuing them for the Zephyr when none of them ever had it; their father (Timothy V. Murphy) had it all along. Meanwhile, the bride's father realizes he is being conned and leads Morgan Grimes (Joshua Gomez) away at gunpoint. When Chuck and Sarah confront him, Klüg uses Morgan as a human shield, but John Casey (Adam Baldwin) takes aim at his head. However, Jack manages to talk Klüg down for the sake of the bride's happiness.

Meanwhile, Morgan and Alex McHugh (Mekenna Melvin) lead Alex's mother Kathleen (Clare Carey) to the Buy More so that Casey can reveal he is alive, but Casey asserts that Kathleen deserves better. However, Kathleen sees Casey and has an off-screen conversation with Alex about him. Kathleen find her daughter disillusioned about Casey being a government hero. A confused Kathleen follows Casey and confronts him at the reception, telling him to tell Alex the "truth", but Casey is urged by Chuck to continue with the con. Later, however, Kathleen witnesses Casey arrest Klüg, identifying himself as a colonel and an NSA agent.

Despite Chuck and Sarah's efforts, Jack discovers that they are getting married. Chuck invites Jack to attend, but Jack refuses to make promises he cannot keep. Instead Jack leaves Sarah her old piggy bank, to which he has only added cash, never taken, more than covering the cost of the wedding.

== Production ==
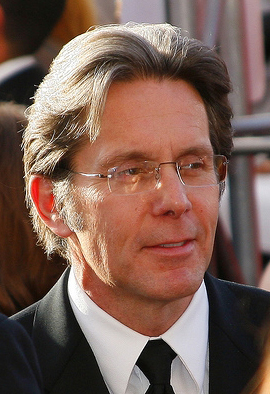
Gary Cole guest starred in this episode.

"The mom thing we're not addressing right now. However, we do have Gary Cole returning as Sarah's dad. It's very much like a classic Chuck episode – like one of our episodes out of season two. It falls back into Sarah's back-story. We get a good heist mission as well. And that's an episode we're working on right now – we're cutting it. It's very much an old-school kind of like our team pulling a big con as opposed to a big spy mission episode, which is kind of a nice change up for us."
— Chris Fedak, when asked at C2E2 if the season would reveal more of Sarah's back-story

"Chuck Versus the Wedding Planner" was directed by Anton Cropper and written by Rafe Judkins and Lauren LeFranc. It originally aired in the United States on April 18, 2011, on NBC as the twenty-first episode of Chuck's fourth season and the seventy-fifth episode overall.

"Chuck Versus the Wedding Planner" began filming on March 7, 2011. Series co-creator Chris Fedak revealed at the Chicago Comic & Entertainment Expo (C2E2) that Gary Cole would return as Sarah's father Jack Burton, and Zap2it confirmed in April 2011 that Cole would appear in "Chuck Versus the Wedding Planner", after last appearing in the second season episode "Chuck Versus the DeLorean". Lisa LoCicero also guest starred as Daphne Peralta, the eponymous wedding planner. Mekenna Melvin reprised her recurring role of Casey's daughter and Morgan's girlfriend, Alex McHugh, and Clare Carey portrayed Alex's mother Kathleen.

When Sarah travels to Miami, Florida to meet her father, aerial shots of the city are shown. The background that follows, however, has been described as "badly CGI'd".

=== Continuity ===
Jordan Bienstock of CNN noted several continuity errors in the episode. Among them is the fact that Jack is surprised that Sarah is a CIA agent, rather than running her own cons, when in fact it was made clear to him in his first appearance that she was "on the right side of the law". Also, Kathleen refers to Casey by his real name, "Alex", but the episode never acknowledges the fact that "Sarah Walker" is an alias.

In contrast, Alan Sepinwall and Eric Goldman noted, in their respective reviews for HitFix and IGN, allusions in "Chuck Versus the Wedding Planner" to past episodes. As in his first appearance, Jack refers to Chuck as "Schnook" and Casey as "Cop Face". Chuck also makes his "famous" chicken pepperoni for Sarah, alluding to "Chuck Versus the Fake Name".

== Reception ==
According to the Nielsen ratings system, "Chuck Versus the Wedding Planner" drew 4.219 million viewers, with a 2.5/4 share among all households and 1.3/4 share among those aged 18–49.

The episode received positive reviews from critics. Gary Cole's return was highly praised, as well as the scene in which Sarah imitates the face Chuck makes when the Intersect has a "flash". HitFix Senior Editor Alan Sepinwall wrote, "Cole's return was as much fun as I hoped it would be - in some ways, even better than his first appearance in season two's 'Chuck vs. the Delorean,' where I liked Sarah and Jack's interaction but thought the actual con job was a bit thin. 'Chuck vs. the Wedding Planner' had its own flaw in the section where Sarah and Chuck are illegally using government resources to catch the con woman and wind up getting more government 'help' than they bargained for... But once Jack turned up in Burbank to help his daughter and her schnook of a fiance be heroes and get back in the good graces of General Beckman, 'Wedding Planner' was really very strong, both as a comedy piece (loved Yvonne Strahovski's accent as she impersonated Daphne) and another story about Sarah's colorful but ultimately sad past."

Ryan McGee of The A.V. Club gave the episode a B on an A+ to F scale, writing that the "episode didn’t really take advantage of Jack Burton's return to the show. Instead, it pushed him off to the sidelines to make room for a storyline that had no earthly business in this episode." Eric Goldman of IGN gave this episode a score of 8.5 out of 10, calling it "a nice break from the Volkoff drama". Melody Simpson of Buzz Focus wrote, "This story line has the potential to bring lots of drama but the way that it has been building up to this moment." Stephen Lackey of Mania called the episode "fun stuff just lacking in drama where drama was required." Brittany Frederick of Starpulse wrote that the episode reminded her "of all the reasons I fell in love with this show a year ago. It's fun, and funny without being campy, but more importantly, it's got heart. It's an episode that made me think, 'This is why people fight for this show season after season.' If it helps turn out more episodes like these, Gary Cole can drop by anytime he likes. I, for one, will be glad to see him."
