= Chuck Versus the Wookiee =

- Chuck episode
- Chuck Bartowski ditches a stolen diamond in the mail
- Episode no.: Season 1 Episode 4
- Directed by: Allan Kroeker
- Written by: Allison Adler
- Production code: 3T6454
- Original air date: October 15, 2007

Guest appearances
- Mini Andén as Carina Miller; Bonita Friedericy as Diane Beckman; Ryan McPartlin as Devon Woodcomb; Iqbal Theba as Peyman Alahi; Tony Todd as Langston Graham; Scott Krinsky as Jeff Barnes; Vik Sahay as Lester Patel

Episode chronology
← Previous "Chuck Versus the Tango"	Next → "Chuck Versus the Sizzling Shrimp"

"Chuck Versus the Wookiee" is a first-season episode of the television series Chuck. It originally aired on NBC on October 15, 2007. Chuck and the team are ordered by Graham and Beckman to recover a stolen diamond to assist Sarah's old DEA friend, whose tendencies towards improvisation tend to get her and those she works with into trouble.

== Plot summary ==
After a gathering with Chuck, his family and Morgan for pizza, Sarah returns to her apartment where she is assaulted by a masked intruder. Following a short and inconclusive fight, her opponent unmasks herself to reveal an old DEA friend code-named "Carina" (played by Mini Anden) who has come to request Sarah's help in recovering a stolen diamond.

The following morning Chuck sees Carina on his way out of his apartment while she's loitering outside by the fountain. He joins Casey and Sarah in a briefing with their superiors, and they are ordered to assist Carina with the recovery of the diamond from Peyman Alahi, who they believe intends to use it to finance drug smuggling operations. Sarah introduces Carina to her "team," though Casey and Carina are already acquainted. Carina is immediately curious about Chuck but Sarah deflects her interest. Before they can leave Morgan sees and is smitten by Carina.

Later, Carina approaches Chuck at the Buy More to question him further, but he evades her when Sarah arrives. Sarah confronts Carina, and while Chuck watches with Jeff and Lester, Morgan pesters Chuck to be fixed up. Chuck relents and asks Sarah to fix Morgan up while prompting her to refuse, but Sarah agrees anyway. The four spend the evening at Chuck's house, where Chuck lets slip that he knows about Carina's past missions. He receives a late-night support request while working on-call for the Nerd Herd and arrives at the location to discover that Carina faked the call to get him away from Sarah. She reveals that only someone with very high security clearance could have seen her file, and when Chuck attempts to deflect her questioning Carina attempts to seduce him. She also reveals that Sarah and Bryce were together before he went rogue.

The next day Chuck, Sarah and Carina infiltrate Alahi's compound for reconnaissance, using Chuck's flashes to map out his security systems. They sneak into the vault where the diamond is kept, where Alahi confronts them. Sarah and Carina take advantage of his infatuation to learn about the security around the diamond. While Sarah distracts him Carina and Chuck take a closer look, and Chuck flashes on a high-voltage security system. Carina improvises and uses a fire extinguisher to safely remove the diamond, and escapes to the beach. Carina plays on Chuck's trusting nature to make off with the diamond and leave them on the beach, though Chuck and Sarah are rescued by Casey.

Casey is sent to recover the diamond from Carina, but she plants it on Morgan, who came to her hotel to see her. She is cornered by Casey, but easily seduces him. Sarah arrives to find him in his underwear and handcuffed to the bed. While playing video games with Morgan, Chuck stumbles across the diamond when he goes to grab a game out of Morgan's backpack. He flashes on the gem and realizes it's not a drug diamond, but is being used to fund terrorists. He calls Sarah with the revelation, but she and Casey have been captured by Alahi, who demands its return. Carina breaks in and tries to steal it back, but Chuck plays on her conscience to help him rescue Sarah. Carina and Chuck confront Alahi to arrange the exchange in the lobby, while Casey escapes confinement upstairs. A fight breaks out, and while Sarah and Carina take on Alahi and his men Chuck flees with the diamond and locks himself in the mail room. He quickly addresses a package and, when one of Alahi's henchmen breaks in, threatens to drop it in the mail slot as he doesn't know where it will be going. Casey arrives and disables the goon, and Chuck accidentally drops the diamond.

Beckman and Graham congratulate the team on stopping Alahi. As the briefing ends a package is delivered to Graham, containing the diamond. The team and Carina say their farewells, but not before Carina tries to come on to Chuck one last time. When he asks her why, she leaves him saying that she always goes after what Sarah wants. Chuck tries to deflect the comment but Carina tells him not even Sarah knows it yet. Chuck later brings pizza to Sarah's apartment to discuss his trust issues with Carina. Sarah smiles to see Chuck noticed she doesn't like olives (she picked them off her pizza during the opening scene with Chuck's family, and the double-date with Morgan and Carina). Chuck says that the fact she doesn't like olives is the only thing he knows about her that is real. He asks her if she can at least tell him something real about herself, such as her real name or where she grew up, or even her middle name. With each one Chuck asks of her, Sarah remains silent. Giving up, Chuck says he's going to get napkins. As he walks away, Sarah whispers "It's Lisa. My middle name is Lisa."

== Production ==
This episode is the first time it is confirmed that "Sarah Walker" is an alias and not Sarah's real name. Later episodes would establish that most of her life was spent using cover names, and that few people other than Graham and her father know her real name. The episode does reveal Sarah's middle name. Although the relationship between Bryce and Sarah is suggested in previous episodes, "Chuck Versus the Wookiee" is the first to specifically confirm it. It is also the first time someone who knows Sarah well recognizes that she is genuinely attracted to Chuck, rather than it just being part of her cover.

During the "Know Ya!" game at the beginning of the episode, Sarah mentions having a sister, though it is unclear whether this was simply a fictitious element of her cover. This came up again during the fifth season episode, Chuck vs. the Baby, in which Sarah reveals that she leaves a girl to be adopted by her mother after she rescued the girl during a mission. Subsequently, she refers to the girl as her sister.

This is also the first time that Chuck has been present during a briefing by Graham and Beckman.

=== Production details ===
- Although Chuck's back is turned and he was presumably out of earshot when Sarah utters her real middle name, it is revealed that he did indeed hear her, as Sarah's real middle name is written on his elaborate Intersect chart first seen at the end of "Chuck Versus the Lethal Weapon."
- Just before the fight in the lobby, Carina and Sarah hold a short conversation. Carina's question is in Mini Anden's native Swedish. Sarah responds in Polish, which is Yvonne Strahovski's native language.
- The episode was originally titled "Chuck Versus the Speedo." It was later renamed due to actor Iqbal Theba's significant amount of body hair.
- Amongst Peyman Alahi's treasures is Vermeer's Girl With the Pearl Earring
- While Casey is waiting for Chuck, Sarah and Carina to return at Alahi's mansion he is approached by one of his guards, who asks Casey if he has a light. Casey immediately expresses his distaste with smoking. However, later episodes establish Casey has a fondness for cigars.
- When Sarah breaks into the hotel room, she is shown using an actual lock pick set, but is holding the pick upside down. This scene is also the first time the team's smart phone (iPhone) is shown.

=== Flashes ===
- Chuck identifies Carina when he flashes on her outside his apartment.
- He detects the presence of the electrified security for the diamond with a flash.
- He also flashes on the diamond when he finds it in Morgan's bag and realizes it is being used to fund terrorists.

== Reception ==
Chuck versus the Wookie garnered 8.36 million viewers. The A.V. Club gave the episode a "B−" rating, stating, "'Chuck Vs. The Wookie' was less a step forward from last week than a confirmation that Chuck has found its bearings after a shaky start". IGN, however, was more enthusiastic about the show, giving it a "Great" 8.2/10 rating.
