= Chuck season 2 =

Chuck
- Season 2
- Season 2 DVD box set
- No. of episodes: 22

Release
- Original network: NBC
- Original release: September 29, 2008 – April 27, 2009

Season chronology
- ← Previous; Season 1 Next → Season 3

The second season of Chuck contains 22 episodes and was originally aired from September 29, 2008 to April 27, 2009. The season continues to focus on Chuck's constant struggle to keep his spy life and real life apart as he becomes more accustomed to being a spy. More background on the Intersect project is revealed. Fulcrum, a hostile espionage organization that covets the Intersect, is featured more heavily as the season's main antagonist. Chuck and Sarah continue to grow closer, complicating their asset-handler relationship.

== Cast and characters ==
=== Main cast ===
- Zachary Levi as Charles "Chuck" Bartowski (22 episodes)
- Yvonne Strahovski as Agent Sarah Walker (22 episodes)
- Joshua Gomez as Morgan Grimes (22 episodes)
- Ryan McPartlin as Dr. Devon "Captain Awesome" Woodcomb (17 episodes)
- Mark Christopher Lawrence as Michael "Big Mike" Tucker (18 episodes)
- Julia Ling as Anna Wu (14 episodes)
- Scott Krinsky as Jeffrey "Jeff" Barnes (22 episodes)
- Vik Sahay as Lester Patel (22 episodes)
- Sarah Lancaster as Dr. Eleanor "Ellie" Bartowski (18 episodes)
- Adam Baldwin as Major John Casey (22 episodes) (Note: At the end of the season, in "Chuck Versus the Colonel", Casey is promoted to colonel.)

=== Supporting cast ===
- Bonita Friedericy as Brigadier General Diane Beckman (22 episodes)
- Tony Hale as Emmett Milbarge (14 episodes)
- Jordana Brewster as Jill Roberts (4 episodes)
- Matthew Bomer as Bryce Larkin (3 episodes)
- Chevy Chase as Ted Roark (3 episodes)
- Scott Bakula as Stephen J. Bartowski (3 episodes)
- Arnold Vosloo as Vincent Smith (3 episodes)
- Jonathan Cake as Cole Barker (2 episodes)
- Tony Todd as CIA Director Langston Graham (2 episodes)
- Patricia Rae as Bolonia Tucker (3 episodes)

== Episodes ==
No. overall	No. in season	Title	Directed by	Written by	Original release date	Prod. code	US viewers (millions)
14	1	"Chuck Versus the First Date"	Jason Ensler	Josh Schwartz & Chris Fedak	September 29, 2008	3T7251	6.84
Chuck prevents Colt (Michael Clarke Duncan) from obtaining the Cipher – a device that would ultimately lead to a new Intersect. Chuck is told that this successful mission marks the end of his espionage career and the beginning of a normal life. Free from bullets and bombs, Chuck finally asks Sarah out on a real first date. But Chuck's role as the old Intersect is not good news for everyone as Casey deals with a difficult order assigned to him – that Chuck must be terminated when the new intersect is activated. Meanwhile, at Buy More, Morgan develops an eccentric way to hire a new assistant manager. In the end of the episode, the Cipher is revealed to be implanted with a virus by Fulcrum, and exploded when activated. CIA Director Langston Graham was killed in this explosion.
15	2	"Chuck Versus the Seduction"	Allan Kroeker	Matthew Miller	October 6, 2008	3T7252	5.83
Chuck must go undercover to retrieve the Cipher from Sasha Banachek (Melinda Clarke), known as the Black Widow. But in order to get close to his target, Chuck must learn the art of seduction from the legendary debonair spy Roan Montgomery (John Larroquette). Unfortunately for Chuck, Sarah, and Casey, Roan is no longer the world's greatest spy. Meanwhile, Morgan offers Devon some advice for a romantic night with Ellie, and Lester struggles to gain respect at Buy More as the new assistant manager.
16	3	"Chuck Versus the Break-Up"	Robert Duncan McNeill	Scott Rosenbaum	October 13, 2008	3T7253	6.17
Chuck is overcome with jealousy when his nemesis Bryce Larkin, Sarah’s ex-lover and partner, makes an unexpected return. Chuck and Sarah’s growing feelings for each other are tested when their latest mission requires Sarah and Bryce to pose as an extremely affectionate couple. Meanwhile, Morgan faces his own challenge at Buy More when he must deal with a gang of bullies, the Mighty Jocks. Led by Mitt (Michael Strahan), these bullies are the employees of a neighboring sporting goods store, and they love to take over Buy More's home theater room to play sports video games.
17	4	"Chuck Versus the Cougars"	Patrick Norris	Allison Adler	October 20, 2008	3T7254	6.87
Chuck learns more about Sarah’s past when they run into her old high school nemesis Heather Chandler (Nicole Richie). Sarah’s teenage insecurities come to surface and she tries to avoid Heather at all costs. Chuck, on the other hand, does everything he can to hear more about Sarah’s hidden life. When Heather’s nerdy husband Mark (Ben Savage) turns out to be a key player in a new mission, the agents must attend Sarah’s high school reunion to prevent the sale of potentially dangerous super-bomber plans – all the action ends with the ultimate cat fight. Meanwhile, Big Mike leaves town for a day and Buy More’s new assistant manager Lester decides to implement a new sales policy.
18	5	"Chuck Versus Tom Sawyer"	Norman Buckley	Phil Klemmer	October 27, 2008	3T7255	6.70
Life in espionage takes its toll on Chuck and everyone is taking notice. Chuck tries to explain his unusual behavior to Ellie and to the quirky Buy More efficiency expert Emmett Milbarge (Tony Hale), but a new assignment only complicates things. After a global terrorist comes searching for Jeff, Chuck is forced to socialize with Jeff in order to find out what role the oddball plays in the mission. Sarah, Casey, and Chuck are all shocked when they discover that the fate of the world and the prevention of World War III rest in Jeff's hands and his ability to play the video game Missile Command, of which Jeff is the reigning World Champion. The designer of Missile Command is found to have also forayed into the command of actual missiles, and he had hid the launch codes to actual missiles within the video game. Chuck convinces Jeff to play an exhibition of Missile Command at the Buy More; however, when Jeff collapses under the pressure, Chuck is forced to play in his stead. Casey is ordered by General Beckman to launch an ICBM to destroy the satellite carrying the terrorist-controlled missiles, while Sarah drives to the TV station from which the terrorists are controlling the missiles. Chuck flashes and learns that Rush's song "Tom Sawyer" is the key to beating Missile Command. After finishing the game and recovering the launch codes, he phones Sarah with the information and the terrorist missiles are stopped. Chuck receives his degree from Stanford after Sarah and Casey use his field experience to supply the remaining needed credits.
19	6	"Chuck Versus the Ex"	Jay Chandrasekhar	Zev Borow	November 10, 2008	3T7256	6.34
Chuck runs into his ex-girlfriend Jill Roberts (Jordana Brewster) while on a Nerd Herd call. In an attempt to save face, he lies to the girl who broke his heart and tells her that he is more successful than he really is. When Chuck flashes on Jill’s boss—a research scientist who may have developed a deadly bio-weapon, he, Sarah and Casey must find out if Jill is involved. Meanwhile at the Buy More, Big Mike nearly chokes to death, which leads company efficiency expert Emmett to implement a mandatory CPR course taught by Devon.
20	7	"Chuck Versus the Fat Lady"	Jeffrey G. Hunt	Matthew Lau	November 17, 2008	3T7257	6.89
Chuck and Jill are enjoying the honeymoon stage of their rekindled relationship. However, Chuck's spy life intervenes when Casey and Sarah inform Chuck that he is needed for an immediate mission to recover a list of CIA Fulcrum agents that Guy LaFleur had apparently hidden in his hotel room before being murdered. Jealousy erupts when Jill finally meets Sarah and learns that Chuck and his handler must pose as a couple, especially when she learns that Sarah is posing as a seductively-dressed escort for the mission. Chuck does his best to reassure Jill that his relationship with Sarah is purely business but only finds himself in more trouble when Jill finds Chuck and Sarah in their hotel room in their underwear after trying to wash off a suspected bioweapon. The team recovers a music box in LaFleur's room, which leads them to the opera, where they recover an encrypted flash drive with the Fulcrum list. Chuck and Jill leave for a romantic getaway, during which Jill is kidnapped by Fulcrum and held hostage in exchange for the Fulcrum list. Chuck agrees to the exchange, but first makes a copy of the list with Morgan's Canadian copying device (designed to copy video games, but apparently able to copy anything). Chuck and Jill embark on another romantic getaway, during which Sarah and Casey discover from the recovered list that Jill is Fulcrum herself. Meanwhile, corporate efficiency expert Emmett is out to get Chuck and interrogates Morgan to get some dirt on his best friend. Morgan blackmails Emmett with footage of Emmett's drunken stupor.
21	8	"Chuck Versus the Gravitron"	Allison Liddi-Brown	Chris Fedak	November 24, 2008	3T7258	6.53
Chuck, Sarah and Casey are shocked to discover that Chuck's girlfriend Jill is a Fulcrum agent in search of the Intersect. In the wake of his disbelief, Chuck is asked to use his relationship with Jill to get to an agent called Leader. He willingly agrees to bring down the woman who betrayed him twice. Meanwhile, Devon's parents are coming for Thanksgiving and Ellie is determined to have the perfect Thanksgiving dinner. To make sure everything goes smoothly, she tells Morgan that he cannot come to dinner this year. Without any holiday plans to fall back on, Morgan is recruited by Big Mike to stand guard at the Buy More with Lester and Jeff.
22	9	"Chuck Versus the Sensei"	Jonas Pate	Anne Cofell Saunders	December 1, 2008	3T7259	7.34
Chuck is still reeling from the discovery that his ex-girlfriend Jill was a Fulcrum agent and goes on a mission to take his mind off of his shock. Casey gets a shock of his own when he finds out that his sensei Ty Bennett (Carl Lumbly), who taught him everything he knows, is now one of the most wanted rogue agents. While on the search for Bennett, it becomes clear that Casey may be too emotionally involved to continue with the mission. Meanwhile, Devon's parents Honey (Morgan Fairchild) and Woody (Bruce Boxleitner) make a surprise visit to help Ellie and Devon plan their wedding. At the Buy More, Emmett reinstates the employee of the month contest, but Morgan, Jeff and Lester have other plans.
23	10	"Chuck Versus the DeLorean"	Ken Whittingham	Matthew Miller	December 8, 2008	3T7260	6.94
Chuck spies on Sarah and sees her on a date with an older man (Gary Cole). Chuck frantically tries to warn Sarah after he has an Intersect flash, but she assures Chuck that she is not in danger and later reveals the identity of the mystery man as being her father. Meanwhile, Anna wants to move into an apartment with Morgan forcing him to finally act like an adult. Devon offers to help Morgan pay for the apartment, but Morgan loses focus on his new grown-up responsibilities by purchasing a 1981 DeLorean.
24	11	"Chuck Versus Santa Claus"	Robert Duncan McNeill	Scott Rosenbaum	December 15, 2008	3T7261	7.66
Christmas Eve does not go as planned when an amateur criminal on the run from the police crashes into the Buy More and takes Chuck, Ellie, Devon and the rest of the Buy More gang hostage. In order to protect Chuck’s cover and the safety of the other hostages, Sarah and Casey secretly go into the store to remove Chuck, but the mission quickly falls apart when Chuck refuses to leave his friends and family behind. Michael Rooker and Reginald VelJohnson guest star.
25	12	"Chuck Versus the Third Dimension" (Note: "Chuck Versus the Third Dimension" originally aired in 3-D, as the name suggests, using the same ColorCode 3-D technology as some of the commercials in Super Bowl XLIII.)	Robert Duncan McNeill	Chris Fedak	February 2, 2009	3T7263	8.45
When Chuck foils a plan to kill international rock star Tyler Martin (Dominic Monaghan), the agents kidnap the musician to find out who wants him dead. Later, Tyler convinces Chuck to go out on the town, which only leads to a night of trouble. Meanwhile, Morgan wins a pair of backstage passes to Tyler's show and holds a contest among his fellow employees, including Big Mike's old football friend Jimmy (Jerome Bettis), to see who gets to be his lucky plus one.
26	13	"Chuck Versus the Suburbs" (Note: "Chuck Versus the Suburbs" was supposed to air after "Chuck Versus the Best Friend". The airing order was swapped in the U.S. due to the show being preempted for the Presidential speech, and since "Suburbs" has a Valentine's day theme, it was aired on the week of Valentine's day.)	Jay Chandrasekhar	Phil Klemmer	February 16, 2009	3T7264	6.84
General Beckman sends Chuck, Sarah and Casey to an L.A. suburb on an undercover mission, with Chuck and Sarah posing as a married couple. Meanwhile, Big Mike is introduced to internet dating by Morgan, Lester and Jeff at the Buy More. To Morgan's dismay, Big Mike's internet date turns out to be his mother. After accidentally obtaining a part of Fulcrum's Intersect data, Chuck discovers that the suburban development is a front for Fulcrum. The team is captured by their neighbors including Brad (Andy Richter) and Sylvia (Jenny McCarthy), who turn out to be Fulcrum agents. As a test, the Fulcrum agents upload their entire Intersect to Chuck's brain. Casey escapes and incapacitates the Fulcrum agents, saving Chuck and Sarah.
27	14	"Chuck Versus the Best Friend"	Peter Lauer	Allison Adler	February 23, 2009	3T7262	6.59
When Chuck flashes on Anna's new boyfriend, Chuck is ordered to befriend Jason to determine the extent of his connections with the Triad. After Morgan is caught snooping around, Chuck must convince the Triad that Morgan is not a threat, just a loser stalking Anna. Morgan, not knowing how close to death he just came, is hurt by Chuck's actions. Chuck foils a plot to kill the Chinese ambassador and Anna and Morgan reconcile.
28	15	"Chuck Versus the Beefcake"	Patrick Norris	Matthew Miller & Scott Rosenbaum	March 2, 2009	3T7265	6.66
The team is ordered to retrieve Fulcrum intelligence hidden in a belt buckle that is in the possession of an agent named Cole Barker (Jonathan Cake), who they code-named Beefcake. Upon capture, Cole is revealed to be an undercover MI6 agent. Though broken up with Sarah, Chuck becomes jealous after noting Sarah's interest in Cole. Chuck, Cole and Sarah are captured by Fulcrum when they attempt to use Cole to lure Fulcrum. They are threatened with torture before being rescued by Casey and a tactical squad. Meanwhile, Lester and Jeff's search for a new Buy More employee turns into a search for the "Buy More Babe". Morgan's reluctance to live with his mother while she is in a relationship with Big Mike leads to Chuck and Morgan deciding to move in together. However, after Cole is captured again by Fulcrum, Chuck is placed under 24-hour surveillance and has to move in with Sarah.
29	16	"Chuck Versus the Lethal Weapon"	Allan Kroeker	Zev Borow & Matthew Lau	March 9, 2009	3T7266	5.80
Cole escapes after being tortured by Fulcrum and returns to Castle. Sarah and Casey are assigned to hunt down a scientist code-named Perseus, who is the mastermind behind Fulcrum's plans to build their own Intersect. They fail to retrieve Perseus but escape Fulcrum's capture after a less-than-graceful rescue by Chuck and Cole. After locating the lab of Perseus, Chuck learns that a man code-named Orion is the designer of the Intersect and headed the entire Intersect project. Sarah wrestles with her feelings for Cole and Chuck, ultimately choosing Chuck. Morgan tries to talk Anna out of moving in with him after previously agreeing to move in with Chuck, but later decides that living with Anna is what he truly wants.
30	17	"Chuck Versus the Predator"	Jeremiah Chechik	Chris Fedak	March 23, 2009	3T7268	6.16
Chuck reluctantly tells his handlers that he has been contacted by Orion, the mastermind behind the Intersect computer and the person who can erase the Intersect from his brain. When the team goes to retrieve the computer Orion sent to Chuck, they run into a Fulcrum agent named Vincent (Arnold Vosloo). After Orion's computer is brought back successfully, General Beckman arrives in person to oversee the operation to locate Orion. At Orion's urging, Chuck goes to meet him but is forced to betray him to Fulcrum by Vincent. After seeing a Predator drone destroy a Fulcrum helicopter, Chuck is upset that Orion had apparently killed himself. Back at home, Chuck receives the schematics of the Intersect from Orion. Meanwhile, a conflict breaks out between the Burbank and Beverly Hills Buy More branches.
31	18	"Chuck Versus the Broken Heart"	Kevin Bray	Allison Adler	March 30, 2009	3T7267	5.72
Worried that Sarah has become too close to Chuck, General Beckman sends Agent Alex Forrest (Tricia Helfer) to assess Sarah's performance and to act as Chuck's temporary handler. The team steals Devon's hospital key card in order to plant a bug in the pacemaker of an Afghan terrorist. However, their plan backfires when the terrorist's personal physician discovers the bug and kidnaps Chuck, thinking he is the surgeon responsible. Sarah, after being dismissed by Beckman, finds Chuck and helps Casey and Forrest to rescue Chuck. Noting that their close relationship may be an asset, Beckman reinstates Sarah as Chuck's handler. Having located Chuck's long-absent father, Sarah takes Chuck to meet him.
32	19	"Chuck Versus the Dream Job"	Robert Duncan McNeill	Phil Klemmer & Corey Nickerson	April 6, 2009	3T7269	6.10
After some initial resistance, Chuck's father Steve Bartowski (Scott Bakula) returns home with Chuck to see Ellie. Upon discovering that Fulcrum is planning to release a computer virus at the launch of the new Roark Instruments (RI) operating system, Chuck infiltrates the company by landing a job that he has always wanted. However, he loses the job after he tries to stop RI's founder Ted Roark (Chevy Chase) from proceeding with the launch. Despite Chuck telling them that Roark has an Intersect, Sarah and Casey refuse to help him find it without proof. Chuck goes alone and on the way, he is aided by his father, who turns out to be Orion. They try to use Roark's Intersect to erase the original Intersect from Chuck, but fail. Steve is captured by Fulcrum, who wants him to finish building Roark's Intersect.
33	20	"Chuck Versus the First Kill"	Norman Buckley	Scott Rosenbaum	April 13, 2009	3T7270	6.21
As a last resort, Chuck enlists the help of his ex-girlfriend, the imprisoned Fulcrum agent Jill Roberts, to find his father. Jill and Chuck pose as an engaged couple at her parents' home to meet her Fulcrum recruiter Uncle Bernie (Ken Davitian). Instead of helping them, Bernie tries to kill them but dies from a heart attack before he is able do so, leading Casey to call it Chuck's first official kill. The team tracks a call to Bernie's phone to the office building where Chuck's father is being held. Although the team fails to retrieve Chuck's father, Chuck lets Jill escape after she fulfilled her end of their bargain. Sarah disobeys General Beckman's orders to bring Chuck in to be locked away and instead goes on the run with him. Meanwhile, at the Buy More, Emmett betrays Morgan and uses him to get promoted to the manager position, causing Big Mike to get demoted.
34	21	"Chuck Versus the Colonel"	Peter Lauer	Matthew Miller	April 20, 2009	3T7271	6.11
General Beckman promotes Casey to Colonel and orders him to bring back Chuck and Sarah. Casey tracks Chuck and Sarah to a motel in Barstow, CA near the Fulcrum facility code-named Black Rock, where he arrests them, despite some interference by Fulcrum. Suspicious of Casey's involvement in Chuck's disappearance, Devon breaks into his home. Casey confronts Devon but is prevented from killing him by Chuck and Sarah, who escaped their holding cell during a blackout. Chuck reveals the truth of his spy life to Devon. Sarah and Chuck return to Black Rock, followed by Casey who offers his help. The team retrieves Steve and the new Intersect before the Fulcrum base is demolished by an airstrike. Steve reveals to Chuck that the Intersect has been erased from his mind after he viewed the new Intersect's images. Beckman declares their operation to be over and Morgan quits the Buy More to regain his honor.
35	22	"Chuck Versus the Ring"	Robert Duncan McNeill	Chris Fedak & Allison Adler	April 27, 2009	3T7272	6.20
Chuck declines General Beckman's offer to join the new Intersect team and quits the Buy More with Casey. Ted Roark's appearance at Ellie and Devon's wedding leads to a gunfight and ultimately his arrest. Meanwhile, the church wedding ceremony is accidentally ruined by a performance by Jeffster!. Chuck uses his government pay to give Ellie the beach-side wedding she has always wanted, allowing her and Devon to finally wed. A member of Casey's special forces team is revealed to be a traitor (and later a member of an organization called "The Ring") when he kills Roark and three other US Marines. When Bryce is ambushed by operatives of "The Ring," Chuck, Sarah, and Casey rush to rescue him. While Sarah and Casey are engaged in a gunfight, Chuck goes into the Intersect room, where he finds Bryce with a fatal gunshot wound. Heeding Bryce's warning, Chuck destroys the Intersect but not before downloading it into his head. Using his newly implanted knowledge of martial arts, Chuck effortlessly defeats the agents holding Sarah and Casey captive.

== Reception ==
The second season of Chuck averaged on 7.36 million viewers per episode.

=== UK BARB ratings ===
#	Episode	UK air date	Viewers (thousand)	Virgin1 rank (weekly)	Viewers (thousand)	Virgin1+1 rank (weekly)
1	"Chuck Versus the First Date"	June 9, 2009	307	1	131	6
2	"Chuck Versus the Seduction"	June 16, 2009	—N/a	—N/a	141	4
3	"Chuck Versus the Break-Up"	June 23, 2009	180	8	106	7
4	"Chuck Versus the Cougars"	June 30, 2009	—N/a	—N/a	141	3
5	"Chuck Versus Tom Sawyer"	July 7, 2009	172	5	163	2
6	"Chuck Versus the Ex"	July 14, 2009	201	7	169	2
7	"Chuck Versus the Fat Lady"	July 21, 2009	194	2	157	1
8	"Chuck Versus the Gravitron"	July 28, 2009	174	5	150	1
9	"Chuck Versus the Sensei"	August 4, 2009	237	3	163	2
10	"Chuck Versus the DeLorean"	August 11, 2009	235	3	166	1
11	"Chuck Versus Santa Claus"	August 18, 2009	263	1	125	3
12	"Chuck Versus the Third Dimension"	August 25, 2009	273	4	127	3
13	"Chuck Versus the Suburbs"	September 1, 2009	273	1	141	3
14	"Chuck Versus the Best Friend"	September 8, 2009	213	2	89	8
15	"Chuck Versus the Beefcake"	September 15, 2009	235	1	172	1
16	"Chuck Versus the Lethal Weapon"	September 22, 2009	234	1	134	2
17	"Chuck Versus the Predator"	September 29, 2009	249	3	164	1
18	"Chuck Versus the Broken Heart"	October 6, 2009	291	3	165	1
19	"Chuck Versus the Dream Job"	October 13, 2009	318	1	—N/a	—N/a
20	"Chuck Versus the First Kill"	October 20, 2009	388	1	89	6
21	"Chuck Versus the Colonel"	October 27, 2009	300	1	131	1
22	"Chuck Versus the Ring"	November 3, 2009	297	1	159	1

== Home media release ==
Chuck: The Complete Second Season
Set Details			Special Features
22 Episodes; 6-Disc Set; Widescreen; Languages: English, Portuguese; Subtitles: English, Spanish, French, Chinese, Portuguese, Thai			Truth, Spies and Regular Guys: Exploring the Mythology of Chuck; Dude in Distress: Explore Some of This Season's Best Action Sequences; Chuck Versus the Webisodes: Web-Originated Minifeaturettes; Chuck: A Real-Life Captain Awesome's Tips for Being Awesome; John Casey Presents: So You Want to Be a Deadly Spy?; Declassified Scenes; Gag Reel; "Chuck Versus the Third Dimension" in 2D and 3D
Release Dates
United States; Canada	United Kingdom	Australia; New Zealand	Japan
January 5, 2010 (DVD and Blu-ray)	October 12, 2009	TBA	March 31, 2010
