= Al Powell =

Character in Die Hard, played by Reginald VelJohnson

- Die Hard and Chuck character
- Reginald VelJohnson as Sgt Al Powell in Die Hard.
- First appearance: Die Hard (1988)
- Last appearance: "Chuck Versus Santa Claus" (2008)
- Portrayed by: Reginald VelJohnson

In-universe information
- Nickname: "Pal"
- Gender: Male
- Title: Desk Sergeant at the Los Angeles Police Department
- Family: Unnamed wife Michael Tucker (cousin)
- Children: Unnamed son
- Nationality: American
- Occupation: Police officer
- Position: Sergeant

Sergeant Al Powell is a fictional character from the 1988 action film Die Hard and the novel on which it was based, portrayed by Reginald VelJohnson. Powell is an off-duty police officer who gets called into work to investigate a potential hostage situation at Nakatomi Plaza. Powell then becomes a central character in the conflict, and a source of moral support for protagonist John McClane. VelJohnson would reprise his role in the sequel film Die Hard 2 (1990) and the second season of the action comedy/spy-drama television series Chuck (2008).

== Fictional character biography ==
=== Investigation of Nakatomi Plaza ===
The audience is introduced to Powell while he is on his way home from work. Powell makes a stop at a nearby service station to grab Twinkies for his pregnant wife. While at the station, Powell is radioed in from his work to investigate an apparent emergency at Nakatomi Plaza. Powell investigates the lobby of the building and is led to believe that the alarm had been tripped due to a bug in the building's computer system.

As Powell re-enters his car and begins to radio that there is no emergency at Nakatomi Plaza, John McClane throws the body of one of the terrorists he had killed onto the hood of Powell's car. After the body lands, the remaining terrorists open fire on the car, causing it to crash nearby. Powell calls in for assistance from his supervisor, Deputy Chief Dwayne T. Robinson. Powell eventually talks with McClane over the radio, knowing him only as "Roy". Powell informs McClane of the LAPD's strategies and provides him with encouragement and comfort during the siege.

Powell eventually reveals to McClane that he was given a desk job after he accidentally shot a child holding a toy gun. Still traumatized, he refused to fire his weapon ever again. McClane eventually saves his wife, Holly, from the clutches of the German terrorist Hans Gruber, whom he kills. Outside the building, McClane and Powell finally meet face-to-face. The encounter is briefly interrupted by Gruber's henchmen Karl Vreski – who was believed dead – emerging from the building with a Steyr AUG. Vreski is shot dead by Powell once Vreski aims his weapon at McClane.

=== Post-Nakatomi ===
At some point between the events of Die Hard and Die Hard 2, McClane moved from New York to Los Angeles with Holly, and he and Powell became co-workers and close friends. During the events of the film, McClane goes to Washington D.C. to celebrate Christmas with his in-laws, and is waiting at Washington Dulles International Airport for Holly's flight from Los Angeles to arrive. While waiting, McClane sees a pair of armed criminals breaking into the baggage handling area. McClane is forced to kill one of the suspects in self-defense.

Due to the unprofessionalism of the airport's police chief, Carmine Lorenzo, McClane is forced to grab an improvised set of fingerprints from the deceased suspect and fax them to Powell in Los Angeles for identification. Powell identifies the suspect as Sergeant Oswald Cochrane, who was believed killed in action in a helicopter accident in Honduras two years prior. Powell faxes the dossier to McClane in Dulles and the two say their goodbyes.

== Production ==
The character of Powell in Die Hard was the breakout performance for actor Reginald VelJohnson, who had previously only had small roles in films such as Ghostbusters and Crocodile Dundee. The role helped VelJohnson to gain the role of Carl Winslow on the television sitcom Family Matters, where he would again portray a police officer. Despite only appearing in two scenes during Die Hard 2, VelJohnson still received fourth billing, behind other returning actors Bonnie Bedelia and William Atherton from the first film. Before VelJohnson was cast, actor Wesley Snipes had auditioned for the part. Gene Hackman had also been considered for the part according to VelJohnson, but was unable to take the role.

=== Potential return ===
It had been speculated that Powell would return in a potential sixth film in the franchise, tentatively called McClane. It had been rumored that VelJohnson would reprise his role in the film, and would appear alongside Bruce Willis as McClane, and potentially Samuel L. Jackson reprising his role as Zeus Carver from Die Hard With a Vengeance. However, the project has currently been cancelled outright due to Disney's acquisition of Fox, and is now planned to be rebooted as a potential streaming service show.

== Reception ==
VelJohnson's portrayal of Powell in the first Die Hard was met with acclaim from fans. Powell has gone on to become one of the most recognisable characters from the franchise, along with John McClane and Hans Gruber. The dynamic between VelJohnson and Bruce Willis in the film was another source for critical acclaim, with many critics citing Powell as the moral center of the film, and with many considering him to be something of McClane's sidekick. Powell's character arc and development throughout the first film was also seen by many as a highlight of the film, signifying living with a mistake and dealing with grief. Powell eventually overcoming his guilt to save McClane and Holly at the end of the film was seen as a perfect ending to the character's arc.

== Legacy ==
Due to the popularity of his role in Die Hard, VelJohnson was cast as Carl Winslow on the television sitcom Family Matters. VelJohnson would also appear in the television show Chuck reprising his role as Powell in the episode Chuck Versus Santa Claus. VelJohnson would also appear as himself in the television show Brooklyn Nine-Nine, which often references and pays tribute to Die Hard, as it is main character Jake Peralta's favourite film. VelJohnson appears in the episode "Bachelor/ette Party" in the show's fifth season during Peralta's bachelor party. VelJohnson is intended to be a part of a scavenger hunt set up by Peralta's best friend, Charles Boyle. However, Peralta and the other attendees, Terry Jeffords and Captain Raymond Holt, ditch the scavenger hunt. Eventually Boyle finds out about the deception and leaves upset. This leads the group to VelJohnson's apartment, where Peralta attempts to apologise to him, where VelJohnson retorts at Peralta and states that he has made an enemy for life, and intends to tell Peralta's idol and VelJohnson's Die Hard co-star Bruce Willis that he sucks. Powell remains one of VelJohnson's favorite and most iconic roles, alongside Carl Winslow from Family Matters. VelJohnson has commented that many fans give him Twinkies when they meet him. The character's lack of involvement in the main plot of Die Hard 2 disappointed fans of the character, who had wished to have seen the character in more than two scenes. The character's absence from the franchise's later installments has garnered a degree of backlash from fans, who have wished to see the character return in some capacity. Movie critic Chris Stuckmann stated in his review of the film, "I wish there was more Powell in it too, I want more Reginald VelJohnson. I understand that [McClane] is at an airport in a different place."
