= Chuck Versus Santa Claus =

- Chuck episode
- Chuck speaks with an injured Casey in the middle of a hostage situation.
- Episode no.: Season 2 Episode 11
- Directed by: Robert Duncan McNeill
- Written by: Scott Rosenbaum
- Production code: 3T7261
- Original air date: December 15, 2008

Guest appearances
- Bonita Friedericy as Diane Beckman; Tony Hale as Emmett Milbarge; Jed Rees as Nathan "Needlenose Ned" Rhyerson; Michael Rooker as Lieutenant Frank Mauser; Reginald VelJohnson as Sergeant Al Powell

Episode chronology
← Previous "Chuck Versus the DeLorean"	Next → "Chuck Versus the Third Dimension"
- Chuck season 2

"Chuck Versus Santa Claus" is the eleventh episode of the second season of Chuck, and the 24th overall episode of the series. The episode was directed by Robert Duncan McNeill and written by Scott Rosenbaum. It originally aired on NBC on December 15, 2008.

The episode revolves around a hostage crisis and is largely presented as an homage to the film Die Hard, featuring Reginald VelJohnson reprising his role from the film as Sergeant Al Powell. On Christmas Eve, an amateur criminal on the run from the police crashes into the Buy More and takes Chuck Bartowski, Ellie Bartowski, Devon Woodcomb, and the Buy More employees hostage. In order to protect Chuck's cover and the safety of the other hostages, Sarah Walker and John Casey secretly go into the store to remove Chuck, but the mission quickly falls apart when Chuck refuses to leave his friends and family behind.

"Chuck Versus Santa Claus" received overwhelmingly positive reviews from critics. According to the Nielsen ratings system, it drew 7.661 million viewers, making it the second most-watched episode of the season, after "Chuck Versus the Third Dimension".

== Plot ==
The morning before Christmas, a high-speed chase occurs near a Burbank, California shopping center, ultimately ending with the fugitive crashing his car through the Buy More front doors. Nathan "Needlenose Ned" Rhyerson (Jed Rees) exits the car and, desperate to buy presents for his children, takes Chuck Bartowski (Zachary Levi), Ellie Bartowski (Sarah Lancaster), Devon Woodcomb (Ryan McPartlin), and all the Buy More employees hostage. Ellie and Devon had gone to the store to buy last minute gifts. Ned communicates with the police via Chuck, and LAPD Lieutenant Frank Mauser (Michael Rooker) negotiates the release of Emmett Milbarge (Tony Hale) as a sign of good faith.

Meanwhile, Sarah Walker (Yvonne Strahovski) and John Casey (Adam Baldwin) watch news coverage of the situation and sneak into the store to rescue Chuck so that the media attention does not compromise his cover, only to be thwarted by Ned. Suddenly, Mauser exchanges himself for two hostages: Chuck's handlers Casey and Sarah.

The scene depicting Mauser's defeat and execution by Sarah was highly praised by some critics.

When Mauser enters, Chuck flashes on his watch, identifying him as a Fulcrum agent. Mauser tells Chuck that he knows that Casey and Sarah are NSA and CIA, respectively, and that they are protecting an unknown asset. He reveals that Ned is a Fulcrum agent who caused the disturbance so Mauser could infiltrate the Buy More. At this point, it is revealed that Ned is far more competent than the hostages were led to believe, having intentionally shot Casey in the foot and separated Chuck from his handlers. Mauser threatens to kill Ellie if Chuck does not reveal where Bryce Larkin and the government database the Intersect are. Chuck reveals to Mauser that the Intersect has been uploaded to his brain.

As Mauser escorts him from the Buy More, Chuck urges Devon to disarm Ned. As Chuck is taken in an ambulance to a Fulcrum facility, Devon, Jeff Barnes (Scott Krinsky), Lester Patel (Vik Sahay), Big Mike (Mark Christopher Lawrence), and Morgan Grimes (Joshua Gomez) make a plan. Lester unsuccessfully tries to tackle Ned, but Morgan manages to distract Ned long for Big Mike and Devon to tackle him and end the hostage situation.

Meanwhile, Sarah and Casey learn that Ned is unmarried and had earlier called Mauser rather than his wife, as the hostages were led to believe. They follow the ambulance containing Chuck and Mauser and shoot its tires, sending the vehicle into a Christmas tree lot and allowing Chuck to escape. After a brief fight, Mauser surrenders, confident that Fulcrum will rescue him. To protect Chuck, Sarah executes Mauser. Unknown to Sarah, Chuck watches the entire confrontation in horror from afar. She lies to Chuck and tells him that Mauser has been arrested. At the Buy More, Ellie and Morgan's girlfriend Anna Wu (Julia Ling) praise Lester for his act of bravery. Morgan watches as Lester grabs Anna and kisses her, turning away before Anna pulls away from Lester in disgust. The episode closes with both Morgan and Chuck heartbroken, Morgan believing Anna to be unfaithful, and Chuck believing Sarah to be a murderer.

== Production ==
"Chuck Versus Santa Claus" was one of many episodes to be directed by producer Robert Duncan McNeill, and was written by producer Scott Rosenbaum. It originally aired in the United States on December 15, 2008, on NBC as the eleventh episode of Chuck's second season and the 24th episode overall.

The exterior shots of the store where most of the episode takes place are of a former Mervyn's store in the Fallbrook Mall in Canoga Park. Reginald VelJohnson guest stars, reprising his Die Hard role of Sergeant Al Powell, who is revealed to be Big Mike's cousin. Michael Rooker also guest stars as long-time hostage negotiator Frank Mauser and Jed Rees as Ned, the hostage taker. Tony Hale and Bonita Friedericy reprise their recurring roles of efficiency expert Emmett Milbarge and General Diane Beckman, respectively.

=== Flashes ===
In this episode, the Intersect is activated once. When Mauser walks into the Buy More, Chuck "flashes" on his watch. This flash reveals that Mauser is a Fulcrum agent, and Chuck urges Devon to end the hostage situation.

== Cultural references ==
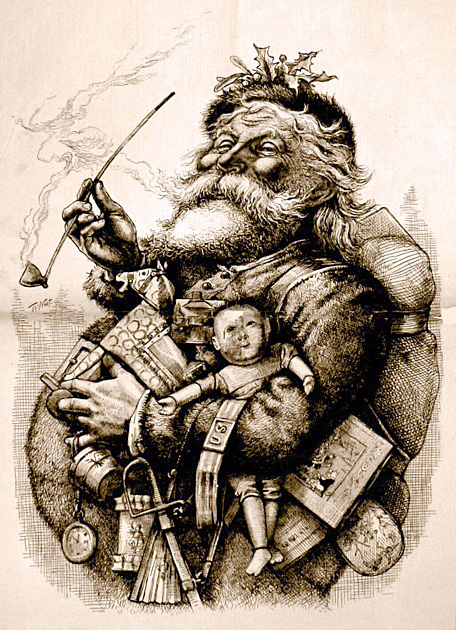
The episode's title references the legendary figure Santa Claus.

The episode is largely presented as an homage to and parody of Die Hard, which was also centered on terrorists instigating a hostage crisis on the day before Christmas. The episode also has music similar to Die Hard, including the song "Ode to Joy". Reginald VelJohnson reprises his role of LAPD officer Al Powell from Die Hard and Die Hard 2, where the character is indicated to be Big Mike's cousin. While Powell bought several Twinkies for his wife in Die Hard, in this episode he and Big Mike are shown eating Twinkies at the same time. Chuck later parodied Die Hard on a much larger scale in "Chuck Versus the Leftovers".

The episode contains a number of other references. Its title references Santa Claus. In addition to Die Hard, the episode has been described in part as "a light-hearted Dog Day Afternoon parody." Ned is believed to be named after Stephen Tobolowsky's character Ned Ryerson from Groundhog Day, and Mauser after Art Metrano's character from Police Academy 2: Their First Assignment and Police Academy 3: Back in Training. Chuck reveals that Christmas at the Bartowski household includes Twilight Zone marathons, while Sarah reveals that Christmas at the Burton household was spent in a Salvation Army scam.

== Critical response ==
According to the Nielsen ratings system, "Chuck Versus Santa Claus" drew 7.661 million viewers, making it the second most-watched episode of the season, after "Chuck Versus the Third Dimension".

The episode received overwhelmingly positive reviews from critics. Eric Goldman of IGN gave the episode a score of 9.5 out of 10, a series high alongside "Chuck Versus the Colonel", Season 3's "Chuck Versus the Beard" and "Chuck Versus the Subway", Season 4's "Chuck Versus the Cliffhanger", and Season 5's "Chuck Versus the Kept Man" and "Chuck Versus the Goodbye". Goldman described the episode as an "especially strong installment, which delivered on a lot of fronts." Goldman praised the scene depicting Sarah and Mauser's confrontation, writing, "The entire ambience of the scene was terrific – a rainy night at a Christmas tree lot, with Chuck secretly watching as Sarah shot the unarmed, surrendering Mauser in cold blood - to the tune of 'Silent Night', no less. Of course she did this because she loves Chuck and wants to protect him, but all Chuck knows is that he just saw Sarah in a very scary light, and it's a great new dynamic to their relationship." HitFix writer Alan Sepinwall wrote, "Chuck vs. Santa Claus" was moving along amusingly enough when it still seemed like Ned Rhyerson was just a hapless criminal with the bad luck to crash into a store built above a top-secret government intelligence facility, but the surprising left turn it took when Chuck flashed on Lt. Mauser took things to another level." Steve Heisler of The A.V. Club gave the episode an A−, writing "Santa Claus certainly delivered (character) goodies to everyone tonight. Morgan gets to be a hero, even if no one notices, taking down Ned with a fake snow machine. Jeff calls his mother–in prison–then finds the time to break up a mistletoe makeout session. Lester sneaks a smooch from Anna, and isn't even remotely fazed when it causes her to run for the hills. And Big Mike's embrace of cousin Big Al is a keeper."
