= Chuck Versus the Ex =

- Chuck episode
- Episode no.: Season 2 Episode 6
- Directed by: Jay Chandrasekhar
- Written by: Zev Borow
- Production code: 3T7256
- Original air date: November 10, 2008

Guest appearances
- William Abadie as Guy Lafleur; Jordana Brewster as Jill Roberts; Bonita Friedericy as Diane Beckman; Tony Hale as Emmett Milbarge

Episode chronology
← Previous "Chuck Versus Tom Sawyer"	Next → "Chuck Versus the Fat Lady"

"Chuck Versus the Ex" is the sixth episode of the second season of American television series Chuck. It originally aired on NBC on November 10, 2008. Chuck Bartowski runs into his ex-girlfriend Jill Roberts (Jordana Brewster) while on a Nerd Herd call. In an attempt to save face, he lies to the girl who broke his heart and tells her that he is more successful than he really is. When Chuck flashes on Jill's boss, a research scientist who may have developed a deadly bio-weapon, he, Sarah Walker, and John Casey must find out if Jill is involved. Meanwhile, at the Buy More, Big Mike nearly chokes to death, which leads company efficiency expert Emmett Milbarge (Tony Hale) to implement a mandatory CPR course taught by Devon Woodcomb.

== Plot ==
In 2003, having been expelled from Stanford University and hired at the Buy More, Chuck Bartowski walks along a row of sorority houses wearing a green shirt. He stops at the house where his girlfriend Jill Roberts (Jordana Brewster) lives to explain that he was expelled under false accusation of stealing tests. Jill refuses to talk about their relationship, before her roommate callously tells Chuck that Jill is dating Bryce Larkin.

At the present-day Buy More, Chuck listens to a playlist before being sent by Emmett Milbarge (Tony Hale) to respond to a technical support call for a biotechnology conference at a nearby hotel. As Chuck sets up the conference network at the hotel, Jill arrives, in need of technical support for her lecture. They briefly catch up about the past five years, with Jill explaining that she got a doctorate after graduating from Stanford. In an effort to save face, Chuck says that he runs a large computer repair business. As Jill reminisces about how she would change things about their past, her boss Guy Lafleur (William Abadie) arrives, and Chuck flashes on him.

At Castle, Chuck reports his flash to the other members of Team Bartowski, who believe that Lafleur may have created a bio-weapon. General Beckman (Bonita Friedericy) orders Chuck to reconnect with Jill and determine if she is involved. Chuck protests, as Jill was the one who broke his heart and destroyed his confidence, but Sarah Walker persuades him to take on the assignment to gain closure, and John Casey remarks that he can get his "mojo" back.

Chuck is assigned to go on a date with Jill at a five-star restaurant, entirely operated by the CIA. Going in under the guise of his billionaire alter ego, Chuck attempts to learn more about Jill's boss. However, Jill realizes that Chuck is lying about his job when Jeff Barnes and Lester Patel interrupt and reveal that Chuck still works at the Buy More. Chuck attempts to call Jill countless times, and Casey mocks him for it.

Later, the team decides to send Chuck to Jill's apartment, where they will bug her phone. When Chuck apologizes to her for lying, Jill later opens the door for him and allows him in, and he successfully plants the bug. During a conversation about their past, however, Chuck turns off the bug, but Casey gains access to it through an override from the team's van and switches it back on. Sarah is conflicted by Chuck's re-established relationship with Jill.

Later, Casey and Sarah visit Lafleur's apartment, where he is attacked and thrown off a balcony to his death by an assassin who escapes them. The team brings Jill to Castle to question her on everything she knows about her boss, and she confirms that he had discovered a cure for a deadly strain of influenza he'd helped develop, and that he was going to present the findings at the conference so that the cure wouldn't be buried. Jill is curious about Chuck's involvement with the CIA at first, but Casey denies it. They decide to have her deliver her speech on influenza at the conference, but Chuck refuses to have her put at risk for an assassin. Sarah, frustrated and jealous of Chuck's feelings towards Jill, agrees to take the role of delivering the speech for her instead.

Chuck receives an urgent message from Casey, who is in the conference room as Sarah prepares to give her speech. Casey and Sarah want to find the assassin who killed Lafleur. The assassin then releases the bio-weapon in the conference room, weakening everyone except for Sarah, who is already in pursuit of the assassin. Chuck recruits Jill, being forced to reveal his involvement with the CIA and NSA and surprises her by bringing an entire squad with him.

The two arrive at the conference, where Chuck volunteers to be given the antigen to the virus, even though Chuck is terrified of needles, he still agrees to be given the antigen so he can cure the civilians and an angry Casey. Chuck fails to extract his own blood because of his needle phobia, so he asks Casey to do it for him, but Casey is too weak to hold the syringe himself. He keels over, dropping the injector and shattering the only glass cartridge. While waiting for Jill to arrive in the conference room, Chuck considers whether passing the cure on through saliva would work. He then defies Casey's wishes to "die with dignity" and kisses him on the lips. Nothing happens, and Chuck realizes he was wrong. Jill arrives in time to withdraw Chuck's blood and derive the cure from it. She and Chuck go around the room injecting the cure into the patients.

Meanwhile, Sarah pursues the assassin and, after a long chase and gunfight, manages to kill him. She checks the corpse for his identification and learns that he was a rogue CIA agent. After all the people are cured with the antigen, they are allowed to exit the building, and Chuck and Jill share a long kiss, as Sarah watches in frustration. Chuck and Jill rekindle their relationship and begin dating again.

At Castle, Beckman informs the team that the assassin Sarah killed was a Fulcrum agent, as the organization mainly consists of rogue CIA elements.

=== Buy More ===
Emmett delivers a box of donuts to Big Mike. When Big Mike starts to eat one, he chokes on it. Emmett quickly uses the Heimlich Maneuver to dislodge the donut, and Lester is hit by the donut debris. Big Mike assigns Emmett to teach the entire Buy More staff CPR, and Devon Woodcomb agrees to be their instructor, preparing them for a test. Emmett warns Chuck that he too has to take the test and will not be dodging it, but Chuck leaves anyway at Casey's signal.

As Devon teaches the staff how to perform the Heimlich Maneuver, Jeff and Lester mock Chuck by staging a catfight with a brunette mannequin as Jill and a blonde mannequin as Sarah. Lester then proposes that Morgan should help stealing the answers to the CPR test, as Morgan is Chuck's best friend, and Devon is engaged to marry Chuck's sister Ellie.

Morgan arrives at Chuck's home and attempts to steal the answers to Devon's CPR test. When Ellie walks in on him she finds him holding her panties. Morgan claims that his intention was to steal the answers for Devon's tests, but not to go through her things. Suddenly, Devon walks in on the two and brags that he is always carrying the answers to the test with him.

When they are forced to take the test, Morgan, Jeff, Lester and the rest of the Buy More staff intend to copy off of Chuck's test, but Chuck leaves when he receives an urgent message from Casey. Emmett throws Chuck's test in a trash can, and the staff panics. Lester conjures a brilliant plan to quickly get the answers: Jeff is to choke on a pen cap as Devon performs the Heimlich Maneuver. Emmett realizes their plan as they immediately answer their tests while watching Devon perform the maneuver, but Emmett cannot stop them as it was technically not cheating.

== Production ==
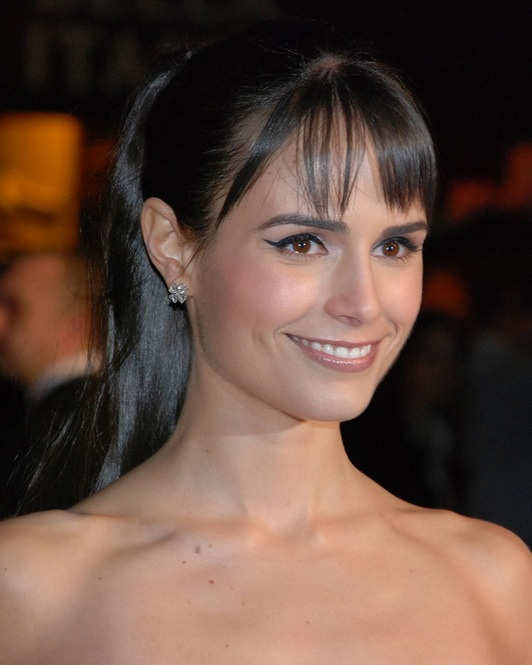
Jordana Brewster was prominently featured as Jill Roberts, the episode's eponymous "ex".

This episode marked the first appearance of Jordana Brewster in her recurring role of Jill Roberts. It was also the first time Yvonne Strahovski used her native Australian accent as Sarah.

=== Flashes ===
- Chuck flashes on Lafleur.
- Chuck flashes on the assassin.

== Cultural references ==
- Guy Lafleur's name is an homage to the Hall of Famer who played seventeen seasons in the National Hockey League with the Montreal Canadiens, New York Rangers and Quebec Nordiques.
- In the scene where Jeff, Lester, and Morgan attempt to cheat on the CPR test, Emmett's line "You may begin... now" is an homage to the cheating scene in Spies Like Us, the cold-war comedy from which Emmett's name is derived.

== Critical response ==
"Chuck Versus the Ex" received positive reviews from critics. Eric Goldman of IGN gave this episode a score of 8.5 out of 10, writing, "A much-discussed but never seen bit of Chuck history was attractively fleshed out this week, as we finally met Jill, Chuck's college girlfriend", calling Chuck's attempts to get close to Jill a "well done arc for the episode". Of the episode's conclusion, Goldman wrote, "Chuck's attempts to save the day led to some very funny situations, culminating when he had a would-be ingenious plan to use saliva to process the cure Jill had put within him, and kissed Casey. The fact that Chuck was totally wrong about his plan was great and a nice twist on 'the crazy plan that just might work!' idea."

Keith Phipps of The A.V. Club gave the episode a B+, writing "This was a pretty terrific episode even by the high standards of this second season. The spy plot worked. The Buy More stuff worked. The Chuck-and-Sarah (or, more accurately, Chuck-without-Sarah) thread led to some interesting places. And we got hot Chuck-on-John action. That's a full hour of Chuck, all right. But there was one central element that didn't work for me at all. This is a story about Chuck's romantic life, past, present, and possible future." Unlike Goldman, Phipps found the character of Jill flatly-written and awkwardly-conceived.

The episode drew 6.338 million viewers.
