= Chuck Versus the Intersect =

- Chuck episode
- Episode no.: Season 1 Episode 1
- Directed by: McG
- Written by: Josh Schwartz; Chris Fedak
- Production code: 276025
- Original air date: September 24, 2007

Guest appearances
- Matthew Bomer as Bryce Larkin; C.S. Lee as Harry Tang; Wendy Makkena as National Intelligence Director; Ryan McPartlin as Devon "Captain Awesome" Woodcomb; Tony Todd as Langston Graham; Dale Dye as General Stanfield; Nickolas Pajon as Vuc Andric; Scott Krinsky as Jeff Barnes; Vik Sahay as Lester Patel; Mark Christopher Lawrence as "Big Mike" Tucker; Julia Ling as Anna Wu; Jim Pirri as Father; Tasha Campbell as Daughter

Episode chronology
← Previous —	Next → "Chuck Versus the Helicopter"
- Chuck season 1

"Chuck Versus the Intersect" is the pilot episode of the American action-comedy television series Chuck. The episode was directed by McG and written by series co-creators Josh Schwartz and Chris Fedak. It originally aired on NBC on September 24, 2007.

The series follows the adventures of Chuck Bartowski (Zachary Levi), a computer geek and member of a Geek Squad-type electronics retail chain (the Nerd Herd), who downloads the Intersect, a top-secret government database, into his brain. Chuck soon finds himself on a date with Sarah Walker (Yvonne Strahovski), who is revealed to be a CIA agent assigned, along with veteran National Security Agency (NSA) agent Major John Casey (Adam Baldwin), to capture Chuck. The episode also introduces series regulars Joshua Gomez and Sarah Lancaster as Chuck's best friend and older sister, Morgan Grimes and Ellie Bartowski, respectively. Guest stars include Matthew Bomer as Bryce Larkin, Chuck's college roommate-turned-nemesis and the CIA agent who emails him the Intersect, Wendy Makkena as the National Intelligence Director, Tony Todd as CIA Director Langston Graham, C.S. Lee as Harry Tang, Dale Dye as General Stanfield, and Nickolas Pajon as Vuc Andric.

"Chuck Versus the Intersect" received generally positive reviews from critics, with most writers praising the casting of the series. According to the Nielsen ratings system, the pilot drew 9.21 million viewers, a series high.

== Plot ==
In Echo Park, California, Chuck Bartowski (Zachary Levi) and his best friend Morgan Grimes (Joshua Gomez) make an unsuccessful attempt to escape Chuck's birthday party hosted by his sister Ellie (Sarah Lancaster). Despite the efforts of Ellie and her boyfriend, "Captain Awesome" (Ryan McPartlin), for Chuck to socialize with the party's female guests, Chuck dispels the women by explaining how years earlier his Stanford University roommate, Bryce Larkin (Matthew Bomer), had him expelled and began a relationship with Chuck's girlfriend, Jill Roberts.

Meanwhile, Bryce, a rogue CIA agent, is shown breaking into a top-secret government computer center and downloading a vast amount of data to his PDA before destroying the computer. As Bryce attempts to escape, he is shot dead by NSA agent Major John Casey (Adam Baldwin), but not before emailing the data to Chuck and self-destructing his PDA. After viewing the rapid series of images, Chuck experiences a series of "flashes" (Note: The episode establishes that a user who has subliminally retained the Intersect data receives feedback from it in the form of what Chuck labels "flashes". Chuck has several flashes throughout the episode.) of data, triggered by things he hears and sees, including a strange man (Nickolas Pajon).

In Washington, D.C., Casey is informed by the National Security Director (Wendy Makkena) and CIA Director Langston Graham (Tony Todd) that the computer Bryce destroyed was a government database called the Intersect, which the NSA and CIA used as a joint resource to identify threats to the government. Casey is ordered to track down the recipient of Bryce's email in California.

At work at the Buy More, Chuck is approached at the Nerd Herd counter by Sarah Walker (Yvonne Strahovski). After Chuck fixes Sarah's phone, she leaves him her phone number, but he decides not to call her. He arrives home to find an intruder stealing his computer. After the computer is dropped and destroyed, the intruder escapes and is revealed to be Sarah, a CIA agent.

Sarah takes Chuck on a date to find out what he knows. Sarah spots and quickly dispatches an NSA team following but flees with Chuck when she spots Casey. Sarah leads Chuck up to the top floor of a skyscraper and attempts to call in an evacuation while Chuck explains what happened when he uploaded the Intersect. Sarah then aims her gun at Chuck when Casey arrives on the roof. Sarah warns Casey that Chuck uploaded the Intersect and tells Chuck that their mutual friend Bryce is dead. Chuck then flashes on the building where the visiting General Stanfield (Dale Dye) is giving an address and puts together all the pieces from the flashes he had been having: the stranger in the Large Mart is a demolitions expert and has set a bomb to destroy the conference. Chuck, Sarah, and Casey locate the bomb in the conference hall and Chuck defuses the bomb by deliberately infecting the machine with a computer virus.

Sarah reassures Chuck that he will remain at the Buy More, while she and Casey watch over him. He is to work with them until they can discover a way for the Intersect to be removed from his brain. All she asks is that Chuck trust her.

== Production ==
=== Conception ===
"A guy named Chris Fedak, who I went to college with, pitched me the initial concept. I thought there was a real opportunity there for a really funny show, while he was thinking thriller. We started talking back and forth and it evolved from there..."

— Josh Schwartz on the series' conception

Chuck was conceived by Josh Schwartz and Chris Fedak. NBC initially gave the series a put pilot commitment before green lighting a pilot order in January 2007. Schwartz and Fedak both attended the University of Southern California and the latter pitched the idea to Schwartz who agreed to develop the project with him. The hour-long, high-concept action-comedy, described in press releases as being "in the vein of Grosse Pointe Blank", would revolve around a man who downloads the entire CIA and NSA databases into his head. Schwartz signed a three-year, seven-figure overall deal with Warner Bros. Television to write and executive produce the series with Fedak.

Schwartz has stated that he set the series at an electronics store to complement Chuck:

I think the big-box culture is very much a way that we live our lives right now. And in trying to figure out what was sort of the best home for a character like Chuck, the Nerd Herd -- obviously inspired by such things as the Geek Squad [of the consumer electronics store Best Buy] -- felt like a really natural environment for him. I also liked that even in the uniforms that the Nerd Herd guys have to wear, they kind of resemble G-men from 1950s FBI movies. So there's a lot of components, both visually and in terms of his character, that were really appealing about setting it there.

=== Casting ===
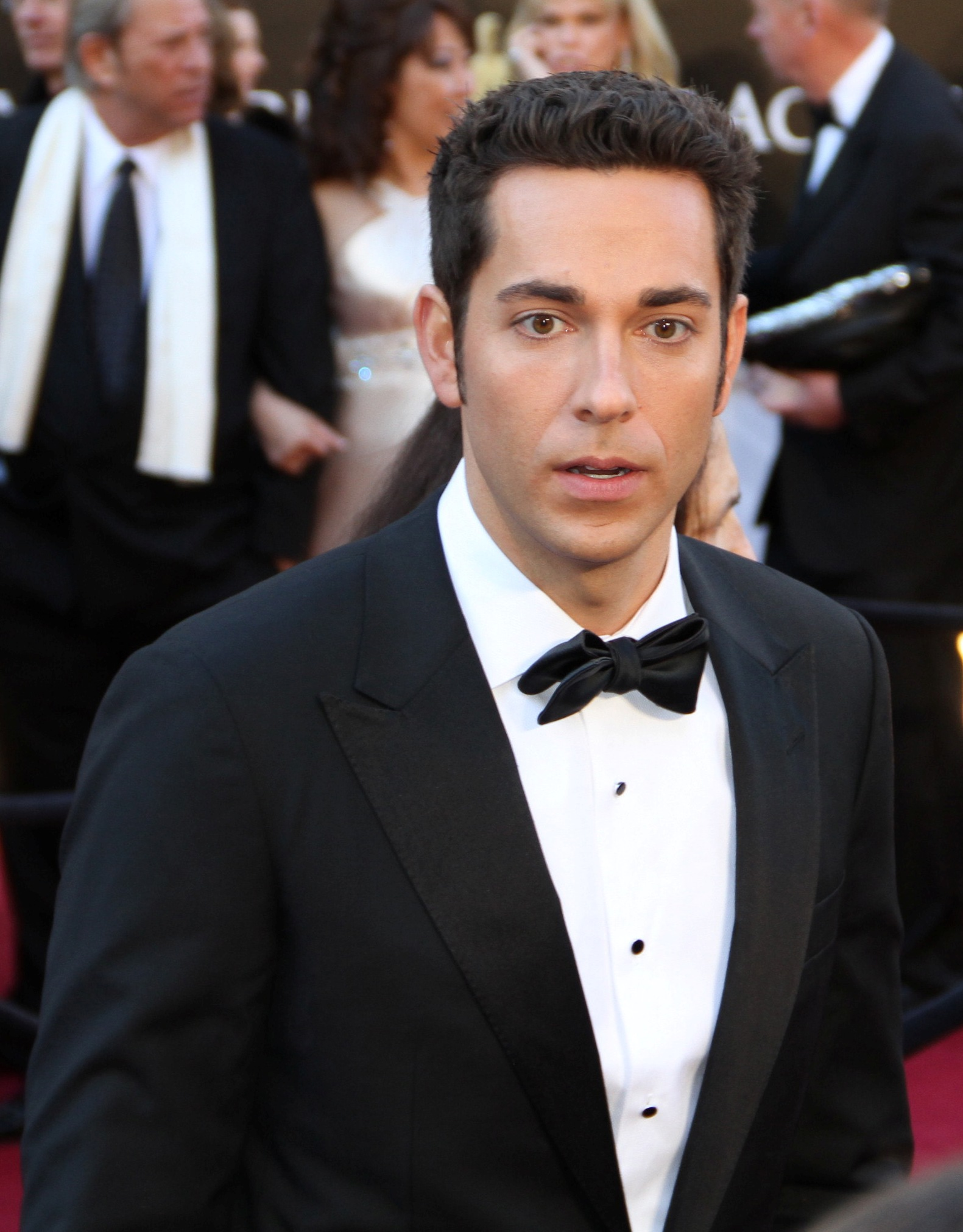
Zachary Levi's role was the first one in the series to be cast.

Zachary Levi was the first actor to be cast in the series, before any other roles had been cast. Schwartz said that casting the role of Chuck was difficult, but Levi was perfect because you "could believe he was a social outcast, but still got the girl." Adam Baldwin was cast as John Casey shortly thereafter on February 8, 2007. Fedak always had Baldwin in mind for the role and the producers found that the actor was a "perfect fit" for the character during the first casting session. On February 12, 2007, Australian actress Yvonne Strahovski was announced for what was then the role of Sarah Kent, joining Levi and Adam Baldwin. Prior to beginning of filming the character's name was changed to Sarah Walker. Strahovski was unable to come to the United States for the audition, so the producers allowed her to audition via the internet.

In March, Sarah Lancaster, Joshua Gomez and Natalie Martinez were cast as Ellie Bartowski (Chuck's older sister), Morgan Pace (Chuck's best friend), and Kayla Hart (Chuck's neighbor and love interest), respectively. Gomez decided he wanted to be part of the pilot after reading there was a ninja in the script. Tony Todd and Wendy Makkena were cast as CIA Director Graham and the National Intelligence Director, General Mary Beckman. The casting for Beckman was narrowed to Makkena and Bonita Friedericy, with Mekenna ultimately being chosen. However, Mekenna only appeared in the pilot, and was replaced in the following episode by Friedericy as General Diane Beckman.

Morgan's surname was changed to "Grimes" before filming, and Sarah's to "Walker". Despite Natalie Martinez appearing in promotional cast photographs, the character Kayla Hart was dropped before filming. Hart, the owner of the club where Sarah and Chuck first encounter Casey, was intended to be a rival for Chuck's affections. However, Fedak and Schwartz found it too unlikely and too complicated to the storyline that two women would be pining over Chuck. Additionally, Captain Awesome was originally planned to be an enemy agent but his portrayal by Ryan McPartlin was so well received that this storyline was also abandoned.

=== Filming ===
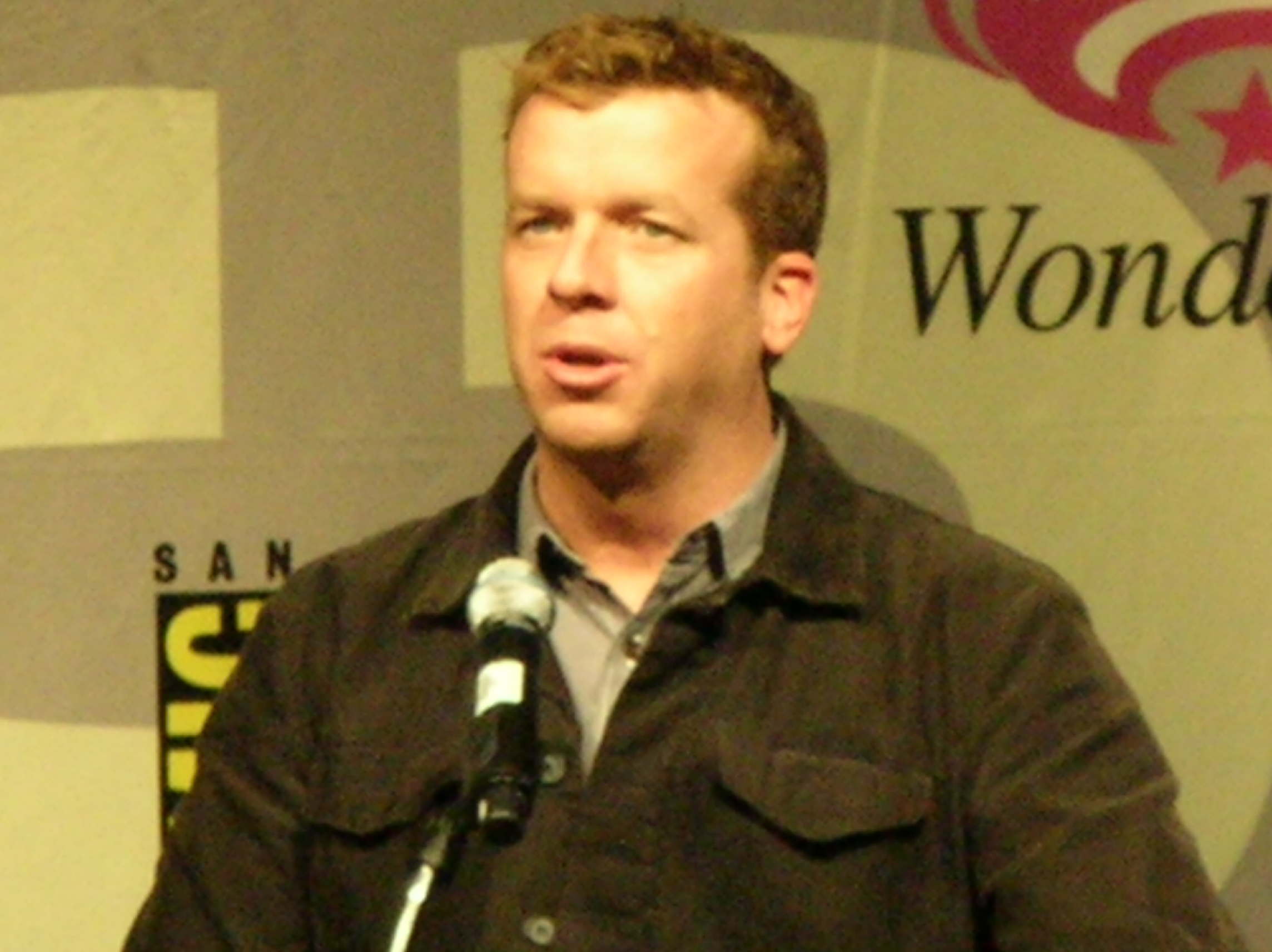
McG directed this episode.

McG, Schwartz's fellow executive producer on The O.C., directed the pilot and consequently became an executive producer (via his production company, Wonderland Sound and Vision), along with Fedak, Peter Johnson, Scott Rosenbaum, Matthew Miller and Allison Adler. NBC gave the series an early pick-up and a thirteen-episode order on May 10, 2007.

McG said he felt the appeal of the series was its mix of an "Office style comedy" and an action series, and added that Chuck's work place "is designed to be as dangerous as the spy world." Although Chuck's apartment is set in Echo Park, the pilot was shot in El Cabrillo in Hollywood. After the series was picked up, the apartment and the building's courtyard were re-created on a Warner Bros. soundstage. The exterior shots of the Burbank Buy More where Chuck and Morgan work are of a former Mervyn's store in the Fallbrook Mall in Canoga Park. Chuck's fingers are bandaged at one point due to injuries Zachary Levi sustained while playing Call of Duty.

=== Music and cultural references ===
The music of Chuck has been described as "a blending of action soundtracks with Schwartz's penchant for good, pretty obscure bands" such as Foreign Born and The Shins. Journey's song "Any Way You Want It" is featured as Chuck's ringtone. Other songs include "Cobrastyle" by Teddybears, "Cellphone's Dead" by Beck, "Put Your Money Where Your Mouth Is" by Jet, "See the World" by Gomez, "For A Fistful of Dollars" by Ennio Morricone, and "The Missionary" by Brothers Martin.

The pilot also establishes the series' tendency to reference popular culture. Schwartz has revealed in interviews that the Buy More is based on consumer electronics stores such as Best Buy, while the Nerd Herd is inspired by the Best Buy subsidiary Geek Squad. When Sarah walks into the Buy More, Chuck and Morgan reference Prince's song "Batdance". Chuck and Morgan also continuously play Call of Duty. A North by Northwest poster is shown in Chuck's room.

During Chuck's flash on Vuc Andric, his first name can be translated as wolf, while the last name Andric can be a reference to famed Yugoslavian novelist Ivo Andrić. The passport has Croatian emblems while Vuc is said to be from Serbia.

== Reception ==
The series premiered on broadcast television at 8pm EST on September 24, 2007, after having been screened to overwhelmingly positive reception at San Diego Comic-Con. According to the Nielsen ratings system, the pilot episode drew an estimated 9.21 million viewers, a series high.

"Chuck Versus the Intersect" received mostly positive reviews from critics, with several praising the casting of the series, especially that of Zachary Levi. Eric Goldman of IGN gave the episode a rating of 9 out of 10, writing, "Schwartz and Fedak's script for the Chuck pilot is very strong, deftly mixing action and humor. Where Schwartz's other new series, Gossip Girl, could use more of the humor he brought to The O.C., Chuck does a great job capturing the wit and self-awareness Schwartz's previous series contained." Varun Lella of AOL TV criticized the episode's opening as being "a weak gag", though writing that "the ensuing moments were hilarious enough to almost erase the poorly executed opening moments." Stephen Lackey of Mania called the pilot better than he expected, as well as "energetic, cinematic, and quite funny." Television Without Pity gave the episode an A− on a scale of A+ to F.

The Columbus Dispatch called the pilot "delightful", writing, "Chuck has good nerd jokes, a winning everyman who is easy to root for, a hot blonde, ninja fighting and a backward car chase." The newspaper praised the performance by the main cast, especially Zachary Levi, who it wrote "should soon be a pleasant surprise to audiences." The paper called the episode "deftly directed by" McG, who kept "things from becoming too silly or far-fetched." Robert Bianco of USA Today gave the episode an overwhelmingly positive review, writing, "Everyday superheroes are, of course, a recurring TV fantasy, but seldom has the genre shown as much pluck as Chuck, and seldom has it found a more agreeable hero than Zachary Levi... Levi needs only a few minutes here to convince you of his wider range and lay claim on breakout stardom."

Steven Hyden of The A.V. Club gave the episode a negative review, rating it as a C−. Hyden criticized Levi as being "likeable but unconvincing playing a loser who hasn't had a girlfriend in five years" and Levi and Gomez as "blandly recreating Judd Apatow's loser heroes without any of the authentic details", though calling Baldwin's performance "one of the few bright spots". Katey Rich of Television Blend wrote that the episode, like Chuck, was "gangly and awkward" and "a lot to swallow in a pilot episode, not to mention totally implausible." However, Rich concluded that the series showed comedic promise and was loved by its audience, "while not necessarily being a slam dunk."

For the pilot, editor Norman Buckley won the Award for Best Edited One-Hour Series for Commercial Television at the 2007 American Cinema Editors Awards. "Chuck Versus the Intersect" was also nominated for Outstanding Main Title Design at the 60th Primetime Emmy Awards.
