= Chuck Versus Tom Sawyer =

- Chuck episode
- Chuck is forced to win Missile Command.
- Episode no.: Season 2 Episode 5
- Directed by: Norman Buckley
- Written by: Phil Klemmer
- Production code: 3T7255
- Original air date: October 27, 2008

Guest appearances
- Bonita Friedericy as Diane Beckman; Tony Hale as Emmett Milbarge; Clyde Kusatsu as Mr. Morimoto; Faran Tahir as Farrokh Bulsara

Episode chronology
← Previous "Chuck Versus the Cougars"	Next → "Chuck Versus the Ex"

"Chuck Versus Tom Sawyer" is the fifth episode of the second season of Chuck. It originally aired on NBC on October 27, 2008. Life in espionage takes its toll on Chuck Bartowski and everyone is taking notice. Chuck tries to explain his unusual behavior to Ellie Bartowski and to the quirky Buy More efficiency expert Emmett Milbarge (Tony Hale), but a new assignment only complicates things. After a global terrorist comes searching for Jeff Barnes, Chuck is forced to socialize with Jeff in order to find out what role the oddball plays in the mission.

== Plot ==
Chuck Bartowski arrives late to the Buy More and Morgan Grimes warns him about the new efficiency expert. As Chuck meets Emmett Milbarge, he flashes on a tough-looking bald man. John Casey identifies the man as Farrokh Bulsara, a global terrorist. Chuck's assignment is to find out why a terrorist is tracking Jeff.

Chuck asks Jeff about the man who was looking for him. Jeff thinks it is one of his fans and reveals a video to Chuck that he has not shown to anyone else: a 25-year-old news video of Jeff being declared the Missile Command world champion. It is revealed that Morimoto, the designer of Missile Command, worked for the Japanese military and was in the command of actual missiles, loaded into a satellite that is laying dormant in orbit.

Chuck infiltrates Morimoto's company, where he finds Morimoto playing Missile Command while listening to the Rush song "Tom Sawyer." Morimoto explains that he hid secret codes to the satellite on the arcade game's kill screen. It is revealed that a bomb has been wired to the game console, and Morimoto urges them to run. They escape before the bomb explodes, incinerating Morimoto.

At Castle, General Beckman realizes that the satellite must be shot down. Chuck proposes the alternate plan of having Jeff play Missile Command to the kill screen, which Jeff agrees to do. Jeff prepares to play to the kill screen, but collapses under the pressure. Chuck realizes that the mathematical pattern underlying the game is the same as the song "Tom Sawyer". Morgan plays the song, and Chuck plays to the kill screen in front of the crowd.

== Critical response ==
"Chuck Versus Tom Sawyer" received positive reviews from critics. Eric Goldman of IGN gave this episode a score of 9.3 out of 10, writing, "This was perhaps the geekiest episode of Chuck yet – and certainly the one that anyone who grew up in the 80s will most appreciate. It was one of those installments that worked to bring Chuck's spy life and Buy More life together in a major way, and did so in an incredibly funny and entertaining manner." Goldman also praised Hale's addition Chuck's recurring cast, writing, "The always awesome Hale is another great addition to a show that's really delivering these days."

Steve Heisler of The A.V. Club gave the episode an A−, writing "Clearly, Chuck is about nerds. But there's a danger to that as well. When the show tries to prove its "nerds are cool" message, it comes off as disengaged... But as was evident even from moment one of season two, the show is trending in a much more exciting direction: This is now a show about nerds, for nerds, doing all it can to embrace things nerds find cool. And thus Chuck no longer feels like a defense of the culture, but a celebration of it. " Unlike Goldman, Heisler found Hale's performance "lacking".

Viewer response was also positive, with an 8.5/10 user rating at TV.com. The episode drew 6.698 million viewers.
