= Chuck Versus the DeLorean =

- Chuck episode
- Episode no.: Season 2 Episode 10
- Directed by: Ken Whittingham
- Written by: Matthew Miller
- Production code: 3T7260
- Original air date: December 8, 2008

Guest appearances
- Anthony Azizi as Sheik Rajiv Amad; Gary Cole as Jack Burton; Bonita Friedericy as Diane Beckman; Stefanie Scott as young Sarah Walker

Episode chronology
← Previous "Chuck Versus the Sensei"	Next → "Chuck Versus Santa Claus"

"Chuck Versus the DeLorean" is the tenth episode of Chuck's second season, and aired on NBC on December 8, 2008. Sarah's con artist father (Gary Cole) appears, and Chuck and Casey are ordered to use his latest scam to pursue a Saudi sheik with terrorist connections.

== Plot summary ==
=== Main plot ===
The episode begins with a flashback to 1990 where a young girl riding her bike is struck by an armored car. When the driver panics and calls for help, a man from another car gets out and says he's a doctor, offering to drive her to the hospital. As he loads her into the car, it is revealed that the girl is Sarah as a child, the "doctor" is her father who used the accident to con the driver out of his money.

In the present day, Sarah takes a personal day and is evasive with Chuck as to why. He follows her only to find her meeting with an older man at a fancy restaurant, on whom he flashes. Chuck's watch gives him away, Sarah confronts him and Chuck tries to warn Sarah that her date is dangerous. The man overhears them, including insulting comments made by Chuck. Sarah introduces him as her father, "Jack Burton".

The team learns that Jack is in town to meet with Sheik Ahmad, who has terrorist connections. The team is ordered to use Sarah's personal connection to investigate and locate evidence connecting Ahmad to terrorist activities. Using the cover of dinner, Sarah and Chuck meet with Jack, where he reveals he pulled a scam he calls the "Lichtenstein", selling a building Jack doesn't own to Sheik Ahmad. Chuck flashes on Ahmad and his men, who confront Jack and attempt to reclaim their money. Jack involves Sarah in his scheme when she comes to help by identifying her as Lichtenstein's assistant. When Ahmad threatens to kill them, Chuck defuses the situation by pretending to be Lichtenstein himself. A meeting is set at the Nagamichi office tower, which Jack has identified as the fictional Lichtenstein building, to arrange the hand-over.

Beckman orders the team to complete the sale to gain access to Ahmad's accounts as part of their investigation. Unaware of the team's true intentions, Jack sets up the plan – Casey will pose as security while he, Sarah and Chuck (who, as Lichtenstein, only speaks German) complete the transaction. They evacuate the tower and hastily convert it into the "Lichtenstein Building." Ahmad's men arrive and the operation nearly fails when he insists on using his own interpreter. Chuck quickly improvises a (horrible) German accent and pretends to be insulted, nearly canceling the deal and prompting Ahmad to agree to the sale. The transaction is completed, and the team escapes just before the scam is revealed.

The team realizes that Jack has double-crossed them and made off with everything at which point Beckman orders Casey to bring him in. Ahmad has gotten to him first, however, and calls Sarah, warning her that he will kill Jack if they don't return the money. Sarah goes alone to try to rescue her father. When Chuck withdraws money out of his account to help Morgan pay off a debt to Devon, (see below) Chuck discovers that Jack had deposited the entire $10 million to his bank account. He rushes to the exchange site in Morgan's broken-down DeLorean where Sarah is confronting Ahmad and offers to return the money, at the same time fooling the Sheik into entering his bank account for the CIA trace for Casey (who had followed in his Crown Vic). A gunfight breaks out, and Ahmad flees in the broken-down DeLorean, but is caught by the police after Chuck reports the vehicle stolen.

With the account information, Ahmad's accounts are frozen. Beckman states he intends to have Jack arrested. Casey vouches for him, acknowledging that his aid was instrumental in their success, and she agrees to pass the information on to prosecutors. Back at her apartment Sarah meets with her father one more time to delay him so he can be arrested. He tells her that he knew Chuck could be trusted, and he made a "10 million dollar bet" that Chuck loved her. Sarah decides to protect Jack from arrest by sending him for ice cream before he can be caught. As he makes his way out, he runs into Chuck. As the police arrive and are greeted by Sarah, Jack asks Chuck if his daughter is "some kind of cop" which Chuck confirms. Jack, with a proud smile, admits she "turned out pretty good, despite having a lousy father." He ends the conversation by asking Chuck to take care of her.

=== Buy More ===
Anna is frustrated with Morgan's immaturity and says they need to take the next step in their relationship, arranging for them to get an apartment together. Morgan states he is broke, Devon overhears the situation and offers to lend him the money for an apartment, provided he pays him back. Morgan looks to Anna, but a customer comes in with a used DeLorean for a stereo install. He mentions he intends to sell it because the car can make only 22 mph before stalling and needs too much work. Morgan, Jeff and Lester are admiring the car, and Morgan offers to buy it with the money Devon lent him.

Devon and Anna both find out. Anna is furious, and Devon threatens to pluck out all of the hair on his body one by one until the loan is repaid. In desperation, Morgan asks Chuck for a loan to pay back Devon. As he goes to withdraw the funds, Chuck discovers the money placed in his account by Jack (see above). Chuck borrows the DeLorean from Morgan and reports the theft to the police when Sheik Ahmad escapes in it. Because the DeLorean was seized by the police, Morgan is able to get his money back, pay off Devon with ten thousand to spare. Anna is ecstatic that Morgan has more than enough to afford the apartment. Morgan's ability to learn from mistakes is tried again as Jeff and Lester beckon him to the upgrade bay. Morgan, Jeff and Lester are in the upgrade bay when a customer comes in with a Dodge Charger painted like the General Lee from The Dukes of Hazzard.

== Production ==
"Chuck Versus the DeLorean" expands more on elements of the back story for Sarah introduced in "Chuck Versus the Cougars." In particular, it provides some insight into why her father was arrested during flashbacks in the episode, and also that Sarah was actually a part of his scams.

Gary Cole's casting as Sarah's father was announced on September 8, 2008.

=== Flashes ===
- Chuck flashes on Jack Burton.
- As Ahmad enters the restaurant where Chuck is having dinner with Sarah and her father, he flashes on the group.

== Reception ==
Gary Cole's appearance was positively received. Although Alan Sepinwall found the premise of the scam thin compared to other caper fare, he greatly enjoyed Cole's performance, particularly his ability to play off Yvonne as well as citing small moments like Jack calling Casey "Cop Face" and swiping a cigar he stole back only moments after giving it to him.

IGN cited Sarah's use of his "Jack Burton" alias in reference to "Chuck Versus the Cougars", as well as Cole's ability to fit in with the rest of the cast. The payoff of Jack stealing Chuck's ATM card earlier in the episode was also appreciated, as were the numerous small character moments. IGN rated the episode an 8.2/10.

== References to popular culture ==
- The scene at the restaurant where Chuck identifies himself as "Mr. Lichtenstein" is a reference to the film Dirty Rotten Scoundrels, where Michael Caine's character pretends to be Dr. Emil Schaufhausen from the Schaufhausen Clinic in Liechtenstein. The use of an employee delivering a message, with Chuck snapping and waving them down, only his arm visible from behind the chair, is taken directly from the film.
- References are made to the DeLorean's connection to Back to the Future, while the Dodge Charger is painted to look like the General Lee from The Dukes of Hazzard.
- The scenes where Morgan is looking at the DeLorean and the Dodge Charger imitate a similar scene in the movie Ferris Bueller's Day Off.
- When Chuck reveals that "Lichtenstein" can speak English and is insulted by the interpreter's "poor" German, Casey remarks that he sounds like Col. Klink. Col. Klink was the commander of the POW camp in the series Hogan's Heroes.
- Casey stated that Sarah's father had checked into a hotel under the alias "Guido Merkens." The actual Merkens played nine seasons in the National Football League with the Houston Oilers, New Orleans Saints and Philadelphia Eagles.
- The name of Sarah's father, Jack Burton comes from Kurt Russell's antihero character in John Carpenter's classic action movie Big Trouble in Little China.
- The DeLorean Morgan buys stalls out at 22 miles per hour. This is exactly 1/4 the speed the car from Back to the Future needs to attain (88 miles per hour) to time travel.
