= Chuck Versus the Break-Up =

- Chuck episode
- Bryce and Sarah pose as a married couple.
- Episode no.: Season 2 Episode 3
- Directed by: Robert Duncan McNeill
- Written by: Scott Rosenbaum
- Production code: 3T7253
- Original air date: October 13, 2008

Guest appearances
- Matthew Bomer as Bryce Larkin; Bianca Chiminello as Juliette; Bonita Friedericy as Diane Beckman; Michael Strahan as Mitt; Steve Valentine as Von Hayes

Episode chronology
← Previous "Chuck Versus the Seduction"	Next → "Chuck Versus the Cougars"

"Chuck Versus the Break-Up" is the third episode of the second season of Chuck. It originally aired on NBC on October 13, 2008.

== Plot ==
Chuck Bartowski is overcome with jealousy when his nemesis Bryce Larkin (Matthew Bomer), Sarah Walker's ex-lover and partner, makes an unexpected return. Chuck and Sarah's growing feelings for each other are tested when their latest mission requires Sarah and Bryce to pose as an extremely affectionate couple. Meanwhile, Morgan Grimes faces his own challenge at Buy More when he must deal with a gang of bullies, the Mighty Jocks. Led by Mitt (Michael Strahan), these bullies are the employees of a neighboring sporting goods store, and they love to take over Buy More's home theater room to play sports video games.

== Critical response ==
"Chuck Versus the Break-Up" received positive reviews from critics. Eric Goldman of IGN gave this episode a score of 8 out of 10, writing, "Some might gripe about stretching out any 'Will they or won't they' dynamic, but there's a reason it's such a popular dynamic in TV – it works! The danger is that if you simply have the agonizingly attracted to each other duo hook up, then what? No, you don't necessarily want to keep them apart for the entire run of the show, but putting them together too quickly can kill the sexual tension and the drama. For now, I like how Chuck is treating it."

Steve Heisler of The A.V. Club gave the episode an A, writing "Just as Chuck giveth, Chuck can also taketh away. Last week we witnessed Chuck, infused with resolve by his love for Sarah, take a leap forward in his role as a spy (literally), and succeed gloriously. But here we are, one mission later, and things aren't going nearly as well. Where Chuck has flailed in the past by letting his Sarah fixation get in the way of his responsibility, here he fails–truly fails–as a result. It's a big step for the show, and it makes for the best episode yet."

Viewer response was also positive, the episode drew 6.172 million viewers.
