= Reginald VelJohnson =

American actor (born 1952)

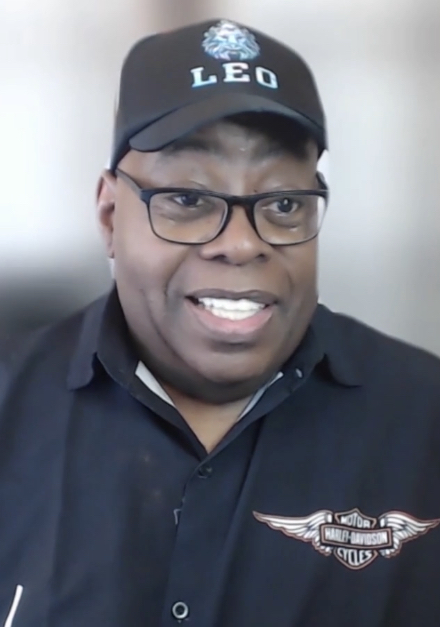
- VelJohnson in 2021
- Born: Reginald Johnson; August 16, 1952 (age 74); New York City, U.S.
- Education: New York University (BFA)
- Occupation: Actor
- Years active: 1979–present
- Known for: Carl Winslow – Family Matters; Al Powell – Die Hard

Reginald VelJohnson (born Reginald Johnson; August 16, 1952) is an American actor. He is best known for portraying police officers on screen, such as Sergeant Al Powell in the Die Hard franchise and Carl Winslow in the television sitcom Family Matters (1989–1998).

== Early life ==
VelJohnson was born Reginald Johnson in New York City, in the borough of Queens. His mother Eva was a nurse's aide, while his father Dan was a hospital attendant. His father left the family, which included Reginald's brother Barry, when Johnson was 13 years old. Their mother subsequently married John Reilly. Johnson attended Benjamin N. Cardozo High School.

He obtained a Bachelor of Fine Arts degree in theater from New York University, where he had a chance to work with Joseph Papp's Black/Hispanic Shakespeare Company, in which Morgan Freeman and CCH Pounder were among his fellow actors. Early in his acting career, he changed his name from Reginald Johnson to Reginald VelJohnson. He later said he changed his name "because I wanted a name people would remember".

== Career ==
VelJohnson is known for playing police officers in films and on television. His early career included a brief appearance in Ghostbusters (1984), as a municipal corrections officer, and an appearance in Crocodile Dundee (1986) as a limo driver. VelJohnson played alongside Tom Hanks, as Detective David Sutton, in Turner & Hooch (1989). He played an ambulance driver in Remo Williams: The Adventure Begins (1985) in which he was credited by the stage name Ivory Ocean.

VelJohnson had his breakthrough role as Sergeant Al Powell in the 1988 film Die Hard. VelJohnson was hired after Gene Hackman, originally hired to play the role, became unavailable, and producers decided to hire a relatively unknown actor for the part. He came from New York to California to film it for nine months, which was so long that he ended up residing in California permanently thereafter. He later reprised the character in the 1990 sequel Die Hard 2. VelJohnson again portrayed Powell in the GameCube video game Die Hard: Vendetta in 2002.

In 1989, VelJohnson was cast as police officer and family patriarch Carl Winslow in the ABC (later CBS) sitcom Family Matters, alongside Jo Marie Payton, who played his wife Harriette Winslow. It was a spinoff of the popular show Perfect Strangers on which he appeared only once, though Payton appeared as a recurring guest star. He starred on the show until it ended in 1998. Since the end of Family Matters, VelJohnson has done mostly voice and guest star work. VelJohnson has made guest appearances in several TV shows, including The Equalizer, Diagnosis: Murder, Twice in a Lifetime, Will & Grace, Monk, It's Always Sunny in Philadelphia, CSI: Crime Scene Investigation, Eve, Brooklyn Nine-Nine, Crossing Jordan, The Parkers, That's So Raven, and Bones. He had a minor role in the 2002 film Like Mike and a recurring role as Pastor/Brother Haywood on Mike & Molly. In 2007, he appeared in the short films Reverse, Nerve Endings, and Time Upon A Once which were made during the reality show On the Lot. In 2008, he appeared as the Al Powell character from the Die Hard series in an episode of NBC's Chuck titled "Chuck Versus the Santa Claus", as the cousin of Big Mike (Mark Christopher Lawrence). In 2010, VelJohnson started a recurring role as Principal, later Superintendent, Strickland on the Disney sitcom I'm in the Band and Funnyordie.com's short HBO film titled Just 3 Boyz starring Tim Heidecker, Eric Wareheim, and Zach Galifianakis. He has appeared in the comedy film The Formula, starring alongside Brandon Baker and Sasha Jackson. He played air traffic controller Bob Abbot in the 2012 film Air Collision.

In 2021, VelJohnson voiced Principal Winslow in the animated adaptation of the comic Invincible. In both the comic and the television series, the main character attends a high school named after the actor, and the character itself is named after his previous role of Carl Winslow from Family Matters. VelJohnson also voices several minor characters in the series. He later reprised his role as David Sutton on Disney's Turner & Hooch.

In January 2023, VelJohnson began appearing in advertisements for Progressive as "TV Dad", a parody of his previous Carl Winslow role.

In September 2024, VelJohnson was announced as one of the celebrities competing on season 33 of Dancing with the Stars. He was partnered with Emma Slater and they finished in 10th place.

== Personal life ==
As of 2009, VelJohnson had homes in Raleigh, North Carolina, and Los Angeles, and resided primarily in Oceanside, New York. He has never married and has no children.

== Filmography ==
=== Film ===
Key
†	Denotes films that have not yet been released

Year	Title	Role	Notes
1981	Wolfen	Morgue Attendant	Credited as Reginald Vel Johnson
1984	Ghostbusters	Corrections Officer	Credited as Reggie Vel Johnson
1985	Remo Williams: The Adventure Begins	EMT	
1986	Crocodile Dundee	Gus	
1987	Magic Sticks	Licorice	
1988	Plain Clothes	Captain Graff	
1988	Die Hard	Sgt. Al Powell	
1989	Turner & Hooch	Detective David "Dave" Sutton	
1990	Die Hard 2	Sgt. Al Powell	Cameo appearance
1991	A Fond Little Memory		Short film
1993	Posse	Preston	
2000	Ground Zero	Burt Green	
2002	Like Mike	Mr. Boyd	
2005	Sunday Evening Haircut	O.C.	Short film Producer, writer
2005	Suits on the Loose	Brother Steedman	
2005	Death to the Supermodels	Tom	Direct-to-video release
2006	Hidden Secrets	Norman Wexler	
2007	Three Days to Vegas	RJ Jackson	
2007	Out at the Wedding	Dexter	
2009	Steppin: The Movie	Mr. Shavers	
2010	Jelly	Joe Woods	
2010	You Again	Mason Dunlevy	
2012	Brother White	Hill	
2012	Air Collision	Bob Abbot	
2013	The Formula	Professor Millan	
2014	12 Dog Days Till Christmas	Probation Officer Art Stephenson	
2014	Strike One	Judge Morris	
2018	Funny Story	Hank	
2019	Avengers: Endgame	Fire Chief	Deleted scene
2020	The Very Excellent Mr. Dundee	Reggie	
2023	Glisten and the Merry Mission	Snowy Owl	Voice
2026	Onslaught	Josiah	

=== Television ===
Year	Title	Role	Notes
1985–1988	The Equalizer	Harmon Hunter	Episode: "Lady Cop"
1985–1988	The Equalizer	Arthur Williams	Episode: "Sea of Fire"
1988	227	The Santa Thief	Episode: "The Night They Arrested Santa Claus"
1989	Perfect Strangers	Carl Winslow	Episode: "Crimebusters"
1989–1998	Family Matters	Carl Winslow	Main role, 215 episodes
1992	Tales from the Crypt	Hotel Guest	Episode: "Werewolf Concerto"
1993	Dream On	Santa	Episode: "Silent Night, Holy Cow"
1994	A Cool Like That Christmas	Dad (voice)	Television movie
1994	One of Her Own	Det. Bob Hymes	Television movie
1996	Deadly Pursuits	Ed Conroy	Television movie
1998	Diagnosis: Murder	Dr. David Sinclair	Episode: "The Last Resort"
1999	The Hughleys	Rev. Bennett	Episode: "Daddy's Going to Hell"
2000	Twice in a Lifetime	Dr. David Bryant	Episode: "Whistle Blower"
2001	The Fugitive	Maurice Beaumont	Episode: "Lagniappe"
2001	CSI: Crime Scene Investigation	Dr. Phillip Kane	Episodes: "Face Lift" and "Gentle, Gentle"
2002	Crossing Jordan	Mr. Holden	Episode: "Someone to Count On"
2002	Will & Grace	Dr. Kaplan	Episode: "It's the Gay Pumpkin, Charlie Brown"
2003	The Parkers	Sterling Oglevee	Episode: "A Sterling Relationship"
2005	That's So Raven	Dikembe, The Ambassador	Episode: "The Royal Treatment"
2005	Ghost Whisperer	Danny Small	Episode: "Undead Comic"
2006	Eve	Rev. Everett	Episode: "Oh, Brother"
2006	Monk	Todd	Episode: "Mr. Monk and the Class Reunion"
2007	On the Lot	Neighbor in 'Time Upon a Once'	Episode: "11 Cut to 10 & 10 Directors Complete"
2007	Bones	Dale Owens	Episode: "The Santa in the Slush"
2008	Chuck	Sgt. Al Powell	Episode: "Chuck Versus Santa Claus"
2009	The Three Gifts	Rodney Smith	Television movie
2009	Family Guy	Sgt. Al Powell	Episode: "Brian's Got a Brand New Bag", Archival Footage
2009–2011	I'm in the Band	Principal/Superintendent Cornelius Strickland	Recurring role
2010	Funny or Die Presents	Christopher	Episode: "Just 3 Boyz"
2010	The Bold and the Beautiful	Ed	2 episodes
2010	Meet the Browns	Ernie Wilson	Episode: "Meet the Baby Daddy"
2010	Glory Daze	Stan Turley	Episode: "Papa Don't Pre-Game"
2010–2013	Mike & Molly	Brother Heywood	6 episodes
2011	Imagination Movers	Bernie	Episode: "The Idea Cafe"
2011–2015	Hart of Dixie	Dash DeWitt	Recurring role
2012–2013	Tron: Uprising	Able	Recurring role
2012	General Hospital	Reverend Love	Episode #1.12632
2012	Childrens Hospital	Judge Lester Harrison	Episode: "Children Lawspital"
2012	The Mistle-Tones	Holly's dad	Television movie
2013	Real Husbands of Hollywood	Himself	Episode: "Tisha and Duane"
2015	Clipped	Tommy	5 episodes
2015	The Flight Before Christmas	Joe	Television movie Played husband of "Marie" (Jo Marie Payton, who also played Reginald's wife on Family Matters)
2016	It's Always Sunny in Philadelphia	Judge Melvoy	Episode: "McPoyle vs. Ponderosa: The Trial of the Century"
2016	Hitting the Breaks	Chauncey van Delaware	5 episodes
2016	Girl Meets World	Officer James	Episode: "Girl Meets True Maya"
2016	Ray Donovan	Sherman Radley	Episode: "Norman Saves the World"
2017	Penn Zero: Part-Time Hero	Mr. Flannigan (voice)	Episode: "My Mischievous Son"
2017	Ryan Hansen Solves Crimes on Television	Captain Jackson #6	Episode: "Escape Room Escapades"
2018	Brooklyn Nine-Nine	Himself	Episode: "Bachelor/ette Party"
2018	The Prayer Box	Billy	Television movie
2018–2019	3Below: Tales of Arcadia	Jerry (voice)	Recurring role
2019–2021	Lazor Wulf	God (voice)	Recurring role
2019	Mom	Jim	Episode: "Audrey Hepburn and a Jalepeño Pepper"
2019	Pride and Prejudice: Atlanta	Reverend Bennet	Television movie
2019	The Movies That Made Us	Himself	Episode: "Die Hard"
2020	Sydney to the Max	Principal Linkenberry	Episode: "Going the Green Mile"
2021	Turner & Hooch	Mayor David "Dave" Sutton	Recurring role
2021–present	Invincible	Principal Winslow, Tether Tyrant (voices)	3 episodes
2022	Ghosts of Christmas Always	Roy	Television movie, Hallmark Channel
2024	Dancing with the Stars	Himself	Season 33 contestant; 10th place

=== Video games ===
Year	Title	Role	Notes
2002	Die Hard: Nakatomi Plaza	Sgt. Al Powell	Voice and likeness only
2002	Die Hard: Vendetta	Sgt. Al Powell	Voice and likeness only
