= Chuck Versus the Cougars =

- Chuck episode
- Sarah confronts Heather.
- Episode no.: Season 2 Episode 4
- Directed by: Patrick Norris
- Written by: Allison Adler
- Production code: 3T7254
- Original air date: October 20, 2008

Guest appearances
- Bonita Friedericy as Diane Beckman; Nicole Richie as Heather Chandler; Ben Savage as Mark Ratner; Hope Shapiro as Bunny; Tony Todd as Langston Graham; Michael Weaver as Dick Duffy

Episode chronology
← Previous "Chuck Versus the Break-Up"	Next → "Chuck Versus Tom Sawyer"

"Chuck Versus the Cougars" is the fourth episode of the second season of Chuck. It originally aired on NBC on October 20, 2008.

== Plot ==
Chuck Bartowski learns more about Sarah Walker's past when they run into her old high school nemesis Heather Chandler (Nicole Richie). Sarah's teenage insecurities come to surface and she tries to avoid Heather at all costs. Chuck, on the other hand, does everything he can to hear more about Sarah's hidden life. When Heather's nerdy husband Mark Ratner (Ben Savage) turns out to be a key player in a new mission, the agents must attend Sarah's high school reunion to prevent the sale of potentially dangerous super-bomber plans – all the action ends with the ultimate cat fight. Meanwhile, Big Mike leaves town for the weekend and the Buy More's new assistant manager Lester Patel decides to implement a new sales policy.

== Critical response ==
"Chuck Versus the Cougars" received generally positive reviews from critics, and Richie's performance was praised. Eric Goldman of IGN gave this episode a score of 9 out of 10, praising Richie's and Strahovski's performances, writing, "This was a highly entertaining episode, which shed some very interesting new light on Sarah, while still making sure there were plenty of questions left to answer. Kudos to Yvonne Strahovski for her portrayal of the young, braces wearing outcast Sarah. It was a funny and effective change, and while the hair and makeup people did great work making her look so different, Strahovski also gave it her all by showing a much more shy, closed off version of the girl we know. Yvonne Strahovski looks the way she does – bad hair, a bad complexion and braces wouldn't make her still not be a pretty girl underneath all of that. But the way the young Sarah was portrayed, it came off as believable that she would be a loner, simply because of how different and reserved her demeanor was... It all led up to one hell of a fight between Sarah and Heather at the reunion, which not only was done to the tune of "Smack My Bitch Up", but also eventually had the women mercilessly beating up on each other in the showers, with the water of course blasting down on them. It's amazing to think how clunky and bad the circumstances I just described could be if done by creators who didn't have the style and wit that Chuck's do. "

Steve Heisler of The A.V. Club gave the episode a B+, writing "... What I imagined to be a gimmicky outing was actually a pretty fun, well-rounded episode, albeit slightly lacking the control of the last three."

The episode drew 6.872 million viewers.
