= Langston Graham =

- Chuck character
- Tony Todd as CIA Director Langston Graham
- First appearance: "Chuck Versus the Intersect"
- Last appearance: "Chuck Versus the Baby"
- Portrayed by: Tony Todd

In-universe information
- Gender: Male
- Title: Director
- Occupation: CIA

Langston Graham is a fictional recurring character in the NBC television series Chuck. Graham was the director of the CIA, and oversaw Operation Bartowski, a fictional top-secret project to guard Chuck Bartowski (Zachary Levi) and the Intersect. Director Graham oversaw the project with, and worked alongside NSA Director Diane Beckman (Bonita Friedericy), until his death in the second season premiere.

== Biography ==
Director Langston Graham was the direct superior of agent Sarah Walker, and assigned her to follow up on Bryce's theft of the Intersect by sending her to Burbank to track down where he sent the data. Little personal information about Graham has been established, other than that he arrested Sarah's father when he conned the wrong people. The details of the arrest and later release of Sarah's father have not yet been revealed. During this event, Graham cornered and confronted Sarah while attempting to recover money her father left in the event something happened to him, where he was impressed by her skill with knives and took her under his wing. Graham is one of a few people who knew Sarah's real name (from her birth certificate), as well as the series of aliases she used growing up as part of her father's con jobs. It was Graham who first gave her the name "Sarah Walker".

== Series ==
CIA Director Graham first appeared in "Chuck Versus the Intersect" alongside the National Intelligence Director, when Casey was dispatched to Burbank to follow up on Bryce's theft of the Intersect. Sarah was already in the city and made the first contact with Chuck, quickly identifying him as a non-threat. After Sarah's failed attempt to recover Chuck's computer, he warned her that Casey was being sent in and he recommended she pull out. When she objected and insisted on "fixing" the situation herself he relented, and ordered her to kill Chuck if he attempted to run.

Graham served as the CIA liaison to General Beckman and the US Department of Defense, and in several episodes assisted her in briefing the team on their upcoming missions and providing additional intelligence. However this was primarily handled by Beckman, and Graham only appeared sporadically in the first season. Prior to "Chuck Versus the First Date", all mention of Casey's orders to terminate Chuck once the second Intersect was brought on line was made by Beckman. It wasn't until that episode where it was revealed that Graham was fully aware of the termination order, and was unsympathetic to Casey's objections that Chuck's skills made him a promising analyst. Graham also confirmed the order to have Chuck brought into protective custody when a Fulcrum agent infiltrated the Buy More.

Graham's final appearance as a recurring character was in "Chuck Versus the First Date". He was in the process of activating the rebuilt Intersect and exposing several field agents to the data when it exploded due to Fulcrum sabotage. The computer and facilities were destroyed and Graham was killed. Shortly before this event he and Beckman activated Casey's termination orders, however once Casey overheard Sarah informing Chuck of Graham's death the order was rescinded.

Actor Tony Todd has reprised his role twice more in the series, appearing in a flashback at the end of "Chuck Versus the Cougars", where it is revealed that Graham mentored Sarah Walker after arresting her father to protect him from a scam gone wrong. He again appears during another flashback involving a mission with Sarah's handler in "Chuck Versus the Baby", the final mission before the Bartowski assignment.

Graham is only sporadically mentioned after "Chuck Versus the Cougars", however in "Chuck Versus the Other Guy" Beckman tells the team that Graham took the name of whoever ordered Sarah's red test—a first kill order to test whether an agent can indeed kill when ordered to do so—with him to the grave. The Director later revealed that Graham himself arranged the hit on Eve Shaw after the CIA uncovered evidence that she had been turned by the Ring. This information had been withheld from Daniel Shaw, and contributed to his decision to join the Ring.

== Personality ==
Few details on Graham's personal life have been revealed. Like Beckman, Graham is portrayed as a stern, no-nonsense individual. He mentored Sarah in the CIA, and placed a significant amount of trust in her by allowing her to proceed with her operation to find the Intersect despite Casey being sent in by the NSA to clean things up. Like Beckman, Graham has displayed little regard for Chuck's family and personal life, and generally overrules Sarah's objections to orders that put Chuck in danger or interfere with his personal life.

== Development ==
Because of Friedericy's height compared to Tony Todd (5'3" vs. 6'5") Beckman is almost always seated, with Graham leaning over her desk to fit them in the frame. Beckman's diminutive stature was later mentioned in the show by Chuck in "Chuck Versus the Predator".
