= Scott Krinsky =

American actor (b. 1968)

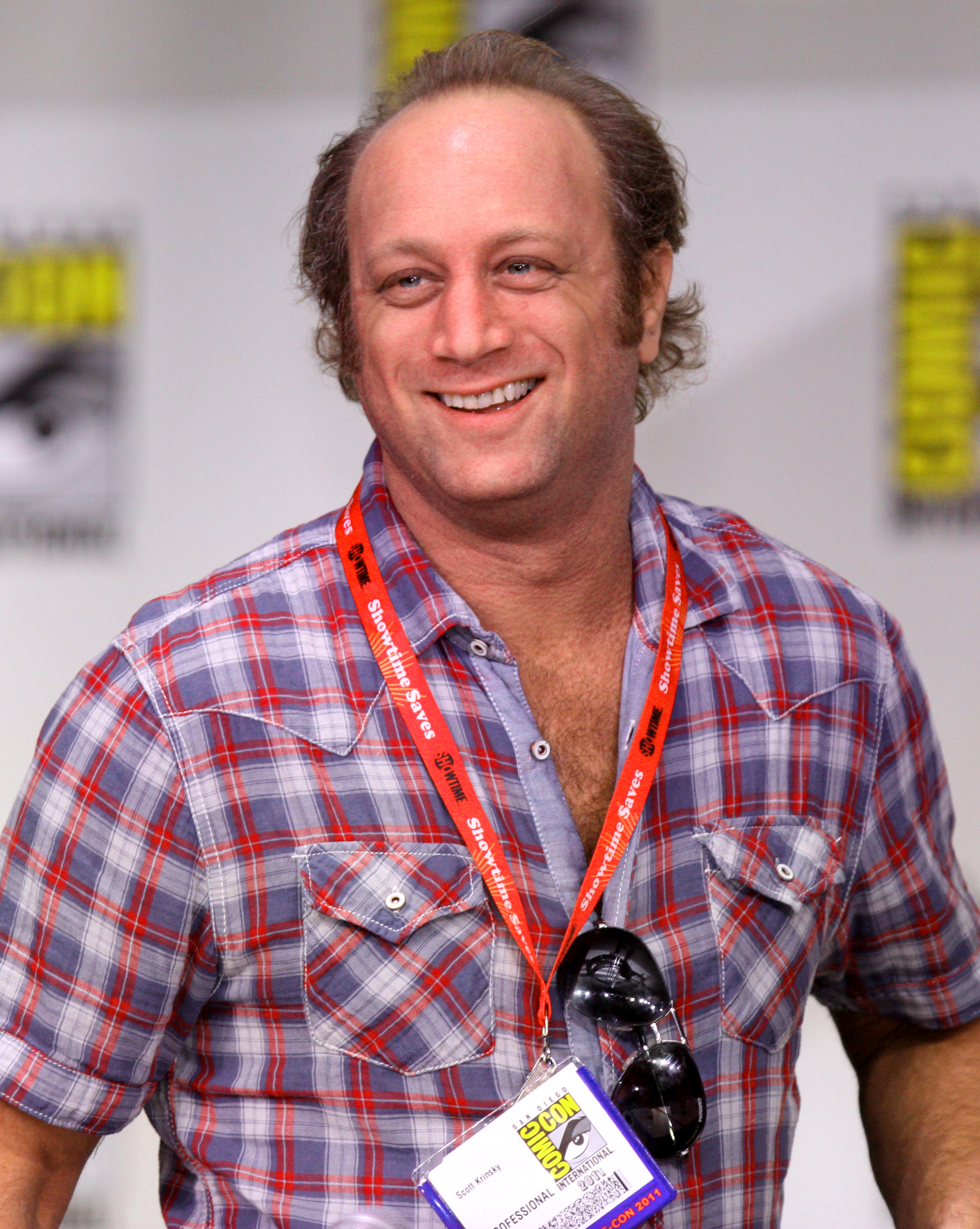
- Scott Krinsky at the 2011 Comic Con in San Diego.
- Born: November 24, 1968 (age 57); Washington D.C.
- Occupations: Actor, stand-up comedian
- Years active: 1993-present

Scott Krinsky (born November 24, 1968) is an American actor and comic best known for his role as Jeffrey "Jeff" Barnes on the hit TV series Chuck and his role as Darryl on The O.C.

He was born in Washington, D.C., in 1968 and attended Sherwood High School (Sandy Springs, Maryland), Class of 1986. Then attended Salisbury University, where he majored in communication and broadcast journalism. He has also attended The Epicurean School of Culinary Arts in Los Angeles. In addition to being an actor, he is a writer and a stand-up comedian who performs at The Comedy Store and Improv in Los Angeles.

== Filmography ==
=== Films ===
| Year | Title | Role | Notes |
|---|---|---|---|
| 1994 | I'll Do Anything | Focus Group Member | Uncredited |
| 2001 | Cutting Tom Finn | Harry | Short |
| 2005 | The Dry Spell | Josey's Father | |
| 2006 | Shamelove | Homeless man | |
| 2006 | Love Made Easy | Potential Buyer | |
| 2006 | Drain Baby | Mr. Jenkins | |
| 2010 | Silverlake Video: The Movie | Garth | |
| 2011 | Transformers: Dark of the Moon | Accuretta Executive | |
| 2011 | Rabbit Cop | | |
| 2011 | Drain Baby | Mr. Jenkins | |
| 2012 | Closure | Him | Short |
| 2012 | American Idiots | Tribesman Awanata | |
| 2012 | Tandem | Bart | Short |
| 2012 | The Money Shot | Jimmy | Short |
| 2013 | Jobs | Homebrew Attendee | |
| 2013 | American Idiots | Tribesman Awanata | |
| 2015 | Tangerine | Parsimonious John | |
| 2017 | Dave Made a Maze | Leonard | |
| 2017 | Captain Black | Dad at park | |
| 2017 | Get Big | Tommy | |
| 2017 | Andover | Lester | |
| 2019 | Myra | Charlie | |

=== Television ===
| Year | TV Series | Role | Notes |
|---|---|---|---|
| 2005 | Without a Trace | Blurry Man | 1 episode |
| 2006–2007 | The O.C. | Darryl | 5 episodes |
| 2007–2012 | Chuck | Jefferson "Jeff" Barnes | Series Regular; 80 episodes |
| 2009 | Parks and Recreation | Norm, the Zookeeper | 1 episode |
| 2016 | Togetherness | Belyakov | 2 episodes |
| 2016 | Maron | Zach | 1 episode |
