= Linda Hamilton filmography =

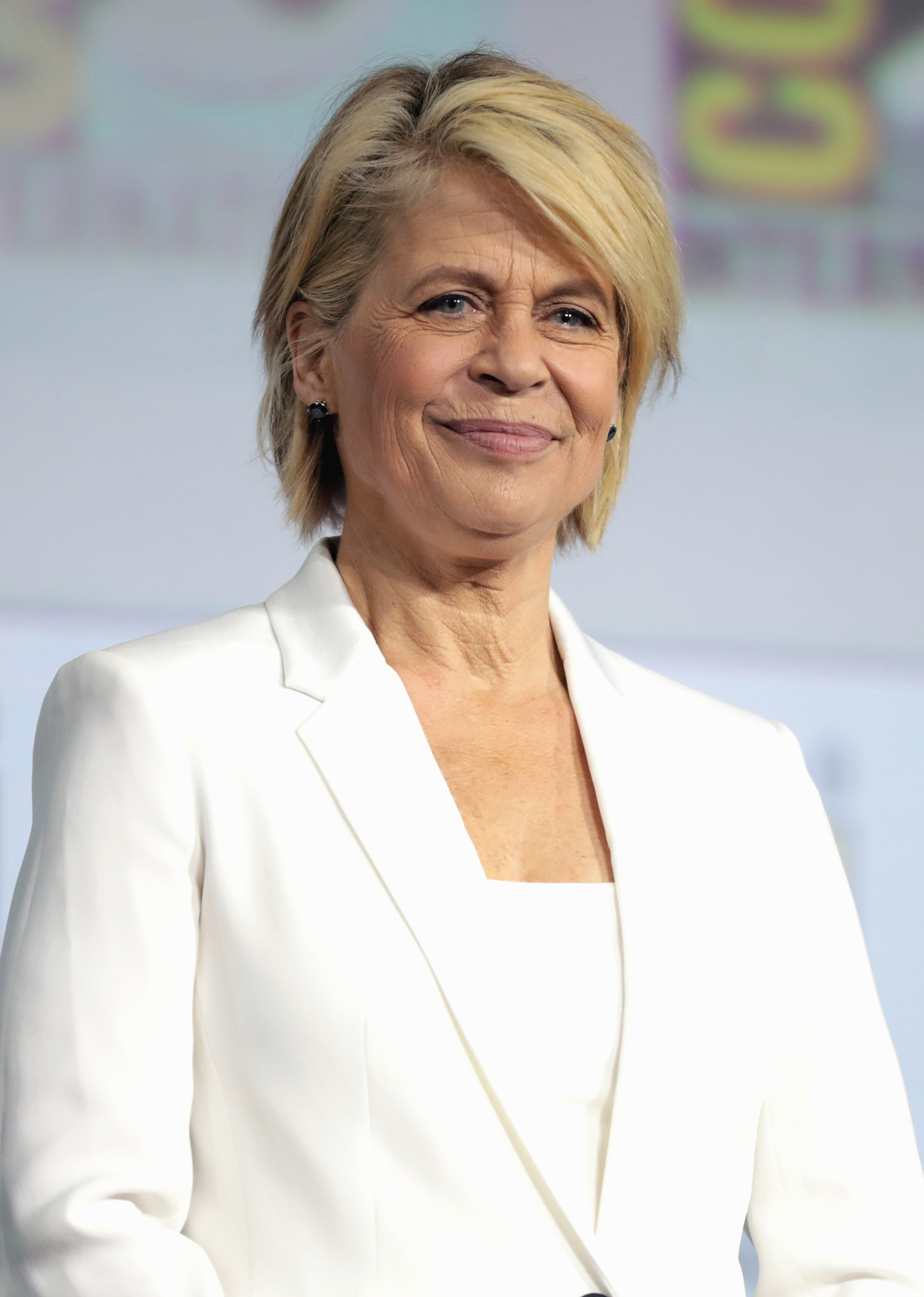
Hamilton at San Diego Comic-Con, 2019

Linda Hamilton is an American actress. She is best known for her portrayals of Sarah Connor in the Terminator film franchise (1984–2019) and Catherine Chandler on the CBS television series Beauty and the Beast (1987–1989), for which she was nominated for two Golden Globes and an Emmy Award. She starred as Vicky Baxter in the horror film Children of the Corn (1984), Dr. Amy Franklin in the adventure film King Kong Lives (1986), and Mayor Rachel Wando in the disaster-thriller film Dante's Peak (1997). Hamilton also played the recurring role of Mary Elizabeth Bartowski on NBC's Chuck between 2010 and 2012.

== Filmography ==
Key
†	Denotes works that have not yet been released

=== Film ===
Year	Title	Role	Notes
1979	Night-Flowers	Wafer	
1982	Tag: The Assassination Game	Susan Swayze	
1984	Children of the Corn	Vicky	
1984	The Stone Boy	Eva Crescent Moon	
1984	The Terminator	Sarah Connor	
1986	Black Moon Rising	Nina	
1986	King Kong Lives	Amy Franklin	
1990	Mr. Destiny	Ellen Jane	
1991	Terminator 2: Judgment Day	Sarah Connor	
1994	Silent Fall	Karen Rainer	
1995	Separate Lives	Lauren Porter/Lena	
1996	T2-3D: Battle Across Time	Sarah Connor	Short film
1997	Dante's Peak	Rachel Wando	
1997	Shadow Conspiracy	Amanda Givens	
1999	The Secret Life of Girls	Ruby Sanford	
2001	Skeletons in the Closet	Tina Conway	Direct-to-video
2005	Smile	Bridget	
2005	Missing in America	Kate	
2005	The Kid & I	Susan Mandeville	
2006	Broken	Karen	
2009	Terminator Salvation	Sarah Connor	Uncredited voice role
2009	Holy Water	Cory Williams	
2010	DC Showcase: Jonah Hex	Madame Lorraine	Short film, voice
2010	Refuge	Amelia Philips	
2016	A Sunday Horse	Mrs. Walden	
2017	Curvature	Florence	
2019	Easy Does It	King George	
2019	Terminator: Dark Fate	Sarah Connor	
2025	Osiris	Anya	
2026	Trust Me, I'm a Doctor	Ellyn Garafalo	
TBA	Hot Curlers †	TBA	Pre-production

=== Television ===
Year	Title	Role	Notes
1980	Shirley	Gloria	Episode: "Teddy Roosevelt Slept Here"
1980	Reunion	Anne Samoorian	Television film
1980	Rape and Marriage: The Rideout Case	Greta Rideout	Television film
1980–1981	Secrets of Midland Heights	Lisa Rogers	10 episodes
1982	King's Crossing	Lauren Hollister	10 episodes
1982	Country Gold	Josie Greenwood	Television film
1984	Hill Street Blues	Sandy Valpariso	4 episodes
1985	Secret Weapons	Elena Koslov	Television film
1986	Murder, She Wrote	Carol McDermott	Episode: "Menace, Anyone?"
1986	Club Med	Kate	Television film
1987–1989	Beauty and the Beast	Catherine Chandler	Lead role 46 episodes
1988	Go Toward the Light	Claire Madison	Television film
1991	Saturday Night Live	Host	Episode: "Linda Hamilton/Mariah Carey"
1995	A Mother's Prayer	Rosemary Holstrom	Television film
1997	Frasier	Laura	Episode: "Odd Man Out"
1998	On the Line	Det. Jean Martin	Television film
1998	Rescuers: Stories of Courage – Two Couples	Marie Taquet	Television film
1998	Point Last Seen	Rachel Harrison	Television film
1998	The Color of Courage	Anna Sipes	Television film
1998	The New Batman Adventures	Susan	Voice, episode: "Chemistry"
1998–1999	Hercules	Nemesis	Voice, 2 episodes
1999	Batman Beyond	Dr. Stephanie Lake	Voice, episode: "Meltdown"
2000	Sex & Mrs. X	Joanna Scott	Television film
2000	Buzz Lightyear of Star Command	Dr. Furbanna	Voice, 3 episodes
2001	Bailey's Mistake	Liz Donovan	Television film
2001	A Girl Thing	Rachel Logan	Television film
2002	Silent Night	Elisabeth Vincken	Television film
2003	Wholey Moses	Valerie	Short film
2004	Jonah	June	Short film
2005	According to Jim	Melissa Evans	Episode: "Lean on Me"
2006	Thief	Roselyn Moore	2 episodes
2006	Home by Christmas	Julie Bedford	Television film
2008–2009	The Line	Carol	11 episodes
2010	Weeds	Linda	3 episodes
2010–2012	Chuck	Mary Elizabeth Bartowski	12 episodes
2013	Bad Behavior	Margaret	Television film
2013	Lost Girl	Acacia	2 episodes
2013	Air Force One Is Down	United States President Harriet Rowntree	Television miniseries
2014	Bermuda Tentacles	Admiral Hansen	Television film
2014–2015	Defiance	Pilar McCawley	6 episodes
2017	Shoot Me Nicely	Layla	Television film
2020	Big City Greens	Librarian	Voice, episode: "Quiet Please"
2021–2025	Resident Alien	General McCallister	Recurring role; 21 episodes
2021	Claws	Eve	6 episodes
2024	Solar Opposites	Narrator	Episode: “An Earth Shatteringly Romantic Solar Valentine's Day Opposites Special”
2025	Stranger Things	Major General Dr. Kay	Main cast (season 5); 7 episodes
2026	Dark Winds	Barbara Sena	Season 4

=== Video games ===
Year	Title	Voice role	Notes
2019	Gears 5	Sarah Connor	
2019	Terminator: Resistance	Sarah Connor	
