= Chuck Versus the Seduction Impossible =

- Chuck episode
- Roan gives relationship advice to Chuck and Sarah.
- Episode no.: Season 4 Episode 14
- Directed by: Patrick Norris
- Written by: Chris Fedak; Kristin Newman
- Production code: 3X6314
- Original air date: February 7, 2011

Guest appearances
- Linda Hamilton as Mary Elizabeth Bartowski; Lesley-Ann Brandt as Fatima Tazi; Mekenna Melvin as Alex McHugh; Clare Carey as Kathleen McHugh; John Larroquette as Roan Montgomery

Episode chronology
← Previous "Chuck Versus the Push Mix"	Next → "Chuck Versus the Cat Squad"

"Chuck Versus the Seduction Impossible" is the fourteenth episode of the fourth season of Chuck. It originally aired on February 7, 2011. This episode followed the intended season finale, "Chuck Versus the Push Mix", making it the first of an additional eleven episodes ordered. Chuck Bartowski, Sarah Walker, and John Casey are sent to Morocco to rescue old friend Roan Montgomery (John Larroquette), while Morgan Grimes meets Alex Hugh's (Mekenna Melvin) mother (Clare Carey) and Mary Elizabeth Bartowski (Linda Hamilton) tries to reconnect with her family.

== Plot ==
CIA seduction specialist Roan Montgomery goes rogue in Marrakesh to capture counterfeiter Fatima Tazi, but she seduces and captures him instead. Team Bartowski—Chuck, Sarah, and Casey—volunteers for an unsanctioned mission to rescue Roan. They infiltrate Tazi’s hideout using a tracker in Roan’s watch. After neutralizing her guards, they find Roan tied up but discover he is using his seduction skills to infiltrate Tazi’s counterfeiting ring. When Chuck sneezes, their cover is blown, and they are captured and placed in a dungeon.

Casey escapes and attempts to seduce the dungeon guard but offends her, forcing him to tranquilize her. He uses explosives to break them out and insists on continuing the mission, despite Roan’s reluctance. Meanwhile, Tazi strikes a deal with a Saudi oil tycoon for $1 trillion in counterfeit “super notes.” When the tycoon protests, Tazi's team executes him. Casey observes the deal but gets trapped when a wall collapses on him. General Beckman orders Chuck and Sarah to rescue Casey and destroy Tazi's mint, allowing them to take Roan along.

Roan surrenders to Tazi, pretending to be in love with her to uncover her motives. She reveals her desire to collapse the U.S. economy in revenge for her village's destruction. Beckman tracks Tazi's location and orders an airstrike. During the mission, Tazi's guards catch Chuck and Sarah trying to extract Casey. Casey shoots them through the wall, and Chuck pulls him out. Beckman personally arrives, launching a rocket-propelled grenade to disable Tazi, and Roan is saved.

Meanwhile, Mary Bartowski, now free from Volkoff Industries, helps Ellie and Devon with their baby Clara but ultimately chooses to return to the CIA. Ellie supports her decision, understanding her mother's calling.

Chuck and Sarah argue about their wedding, with Chuck wanting a big celebration and Sarah preferring to elope. Roan advises them to listen to each other, and they resolve their differences, with Chuck expressing a desire to meet Sarah’s family.

== Production ==
It was announced in January 2011 that John Larroquette would reprise his highly praised role of Roan Montgomery. Clare Carey also returned briefly as Alex's mother Kathleen McHugh. The episode was written by series co-creator Chris Fedak along with Kristin Newman. Though the episode takes place in Marrakesh, Morocco, the opening shots are actually of the Luxor Temple in Egypt.

=== Continuity ===
This episode's title references "Chuck Versus the Seduction", where Roan Montgomery originally appeared. Further, Casey's inability to seduce the dungeon guard is directly attributed to his failure of Roan's "seduction school".

=== Flashes ===
- Chuck flashes on a Saudi oil tycoon.

== Cultural references ==
- This episode's title references Mission: Impossible.
- Fatima is believed to be named after the Barbara Carrera villainess Fatima Blush from Never Say Never Again.
- Before sneezing, Chuck compares his situation to The Three Stooges.
- Mary tells Clara a version of the fairy tale Sleeping Beauty.

== Music ==
Songs listed by Alan Sepinwall.

- "Black Red" by Dr. Dog
- "65 Bars & A Taste of Soul" by Charles Wright & the Watts 103rd Street Rhythm Band
- "Breeze" by Alex Silverman
- "Sixteen Tons" by Tennessee Ernie Ford
- "Wind of Change" by Scorpions

== Reception ==
"Chuck Versus the Seduction Impossible" drew 5.41 million viewers.

The episode received positive reviews from critics. Eric Goldman of IGN gave this episode a score of 9 out of 10, praising Larroquette's performance and calling his flashback scene with Friedricy "hysterical". Goldman enjoyed Casey's scenes and found Chuck and Sarah's argument believable, although "the scenes with Mary and Ellie felt like a bit of an afterthought". Goldman concluded, "All in all, 'Chuck Versus The Seduction Impossible' was one of the most purely enjoyable episodes of the season."

HitFix writer Alan Sepinwall wrote, "Larroquette was Larroquette, and Bonita Friedericy made a meal out of the first real General Beckman episode to date, from the dirty blonde '80s flashback to Beckman whipping out a rocket launcher to save her man and take down the evil Fatima. Beckman is usually there to represent the way things are supposed to get done in spy world, as opposed to the ridiculous way Team Bartowski usually conducts itself, so it was amusing to see that Beckman has her own weak spots, and can get just as emotionally over-invested in a mission as Chuck or Sarah, who for once were the ones complaining about all the interpersonal issues interfering with a mission." Alan Sepinwall concluded, "All in all, a very strong start to season 4.1, or whatever we want to call it."

Steve Heisler of The A.V. Club, however, gave the episode a C−, writing "Chuck doesn't do baby steps well, and because last week's episode was so epic, 'Seduction Impossible' was a lot of tiny strides and fabricated drama, saved by a couple of vintage Roan Montgomery/General Beckman shots and Sarah belly dancing."
