= Chuck Versus the Push Mix =

- Chuck episode
- Chuck proposes to Sarah.
- Episode no.: Season 4 Episode 13
- Directed by: Peter Lauer
- Written by: Rafe Judkins; Lauren LeFranc
- Original air date: January 31, 2011

Guest appearances
- Linda Hamilton as Mary Elizabeth Bartowski; Timothy Dalton as Alexei Volkoff; Mekenna Melvin as Alex McHugh; Sonita Henry as Dr. Ayub; Igor Jijikine as Armand; Fred Cross as Roni Eimacher; Kevin Fabian as Barry Greenfield

Episode chronology
| ← Previous "Chuck Versus the Gobbler" | Next → "Chuck Versus the Seduction Impossible" |

"Chuck Versus the Push Mix" is the thirteenth episode of the fourth season of Chuck. It originally aired on January 31, 2011. Much like "Chuck Versus the Other Guy" in the third season, this episode was intended to be the fourth season finale before an additional eleven episodes were ordered. As a result, the episode featured the conclusion of several story arcs, and series co-creator Josh Schwartz boasted that it would end with the "best 10 minutes in the show's history".

== Plot ==
Chuck, Morgan, and Alex are in a hospital room where John Casey is unconscious after injuries from a previous mission. When Casey awakens, he reveals a critical clue hidden in his pants: the Hydra database stored in the glass eye of Yuri the Gobbler. Casey’s cryptic responses prove to Chuck that Sarah has not gone rogue, restoring his trust in her.

Meanwhile, in Moscow, Sarah and Mary Bartowski infiltrate Alexei Volkoff’s office, trying to access the Hydra network, which is hidden on a ship called The Contessa. Back in the U.S., Chuck flashes on the eye fragment, discovering it was designed by Roni Eimacher, a kidnapped engineer forced to create the device. Chuck and Morgan locate Eimacher, who reveals that The Contessa is Volkoff's mobile base. They infiltrate the ship and rendezvous with Sarah and Mary.

The team attempts to access Hydra but is locked in, requiring Volkoff’s voice for entry. When Volkoff arrives, Mary holds him at gunpoint, allowing the others to escape. Volkoff overpowers her and receives a message from Chuck’s father, Orion. Chuck lures Volkoff to Orion’s cabin, where he subdues him and records Volkoff’s voice, unlocking Hydra. As Volkoff's men close in, General Beckman arrives with her forces, arresting him and neutralizing the threat.

At the hospital, Ellie goes into labor, but Devon panics when he realizes that the "Push Mix" CD Chuck prepared to soothe Ellie is missing, stolen by Jeff and Lester. Despite their antics, Ellie gives birth to baby Clara, with Mary by her side, sharing a touching family moment. Devon describes the experience of holding Clara for the first time as "awesome."

Meanwhile, Casey battles an assassin sent by Volkoff, ultimately defeating him with a bonsai tree gifted by his daughter Alex. He later advises Devon not to miss any important moments with his child, expressing his own regrets about missing Alex’s birth.

The episode culminates with Chuck finally proposing to Sarah in the hospital hallway, and she joyfully accepts. They kneel together, embracing and kissing, as their engagement becomes official. The team’s personal and professional lives converge, symbolizing new beginnings and strengthened relationships.

== Production ==
=== Continuity ===
- Stephen's cabin from "Chuck Versus the Living Dead" is revisited.
- After Chuck reveals himself to be in the cabin, he says "Hello Alexei, I believe you were looking for me." Volkoff himself says the same thing to Chuck in "Chuck Versus the First Fight" when he reveals his identity.
- The image labeled as "Moscow" is actually the Buda Castle in Budapest, Hungary, not the Kremlin Palace.

=== Flashes ===
- Chuck flashes on an engineer who designed Hydra.

== Cultural references ==
- Jeff and Lester wear Salt-N-Pepa jackets while singing "Push It".
- Stephen's "Twin Pines cabin" references Back to the Future.
- Morgan's use of yoga to get through a hallway full of lasers references Entrapment.
- Morgan identifies Ronnie Eicherman through his online Settlers of Catan league.
- Volkoff states that he purchased The Contessa through the classified ads website, Craigslist Dubai.

The SUV with Volkoff arriving at The Contessa referenced Back To The Future with the license plate 1PT21GW (1.21 gigawatts)

== Reception ==
"Chuck Versus the Push Mix" drew 5.57 million viewers.

Eric Goldman of IGN gave this episode a score of 8.5 out of 10, praising Dalton's performance. Goldman wrote, "Even while I was macabrely vexing the non-death of Casey, I couldn't resist the final moments of this episode, which worked like gangbusters. Seeing Devon holding his baby daughter for the first time and declaring, 'Awesome,' was wonderfully effective, because look, even the Captain has to admit that's truly the most awesome thing he's seen. And I loved how Chuck proposing to Sarah was handled – on the fly, with a guy cleaning the floor behind them. The fact that we didn't hear what Chuck said was perfect too. We knew what he was saying, basically, and knew more than enough about them as a couple to not have to hear the exact words."

HitFix writer Alan Sepinwall questioned Schwartz's statement that the episode ended with the "best 10 minutes in the show's history". Sepinwall also wrote, "Kudos to whichever member of the production team - whether it was writers Rafe Judkins and Lauren LeFranc, or director Peter Lauer, or someone else - decided to frame the proposal in the background of the shot, with the dialogue overwhelmed by the sound of the floor waxer. We already heard the big flowery speech and swelling music when Chuck almost proposed in 'Chuck vs. the Balcony,' and we know from Levi and Strahovski's body language what happened here - I say give the kids a little moment to themselves, okay? It probably had more power for being done this way."

Steve Heisler of The A.V. Club gave the episode a B. Heisler stated, "Thankfully, there were literally only two moments in 'Push Mix' that felt remotely gratuitous on the Chuck and Sarah front: One was the major smooch when the two reunite on the Contessa; the other comes at the very end, a marriage proposal overshadowed by the whir of a hospital floor waxer. Both moments, even that final one, were dealt with quickly and showed no signs of labor (to say nothing of what was literally happening in the other room)."

Couch Baron of Television Without Pity gave the episode an A, saying "I think everyone's in agreement that now, finally, Chuck really is a CIA agent."
