= In G Major =

- Choreographer: Jerome Robbins
- Music: Maurice Ravel
- Premiere: May 15, 1975; New York State Theater
- Original ballet company: New York City Ballet
- Design: Rouben Ter-Arutunian; Erté
- Genre: neoclassical ballet

In G Major (originally titled Concerto in G, also known as En Sol) is a ballet choreographed by Jerome Robbins to Maurice Ravel's Piano Concerto in G Major. Performed by a cast of fourteen, the ballet featured Broadway-inspired choreography. The ballet was created for the New York City Ballet's Ravel Festival, which celebrated the centenary of Ravel, and premiered on May 15, 1975, at the New York State Theater, with Suzanne Farrell and Peter Martins originating the two lead roles.

== Choreography ==
In G Major is set to Ravel's Piano Concerto in G Major, which the composer said "uses certain effects borrowed from jazz, but only in moderation." The ballet is performed by two soloists, who dance the central pas de deux that takes place in the second movement, and a corps de ballet consisting of six men and six women.

Author Nancy Reynolds described,

[In In G Major,] matching in spirit Ravel's unaccustomed "borrowings" from jazz (as the composer called them), Robbins produced a rather clichéd but nonetheless skillful and entertaining work, with a creamy-smooth central pas de deux. Particularly in the outer movements, both music and dance gave the impression of having been seen or heard somewhere before. In Robbins's extensive quotations of Broadway-style material ... he seemed often to reach for the too-obvious solution, possibly in keeping with Ravel's idea that a concerto should be "light-hearted and brilliant and not aim at profundity or dramatic effects."

Robbins' biographer Amanda Vaill described the central pas de deux, "Drifting and slow, it was full of hesitations: first the girl step toward the boy, then retreats; then he advances and retreats; when they come together, he holds her as she unfolds herself, becomes known to him, and their duet is full of parallel partnering alternating with beautiful exultant lifts."

== Development and performances ==
In 1975, the New York City Ballet, at the instigation of co-founder George Balanchine, held the Ravel Festival, in honor of Maurice Ravel's centenary. Modelled after the Stravinsky Festival in 1972, the two-week-long Ravel Festival featured the premieres of 16 new works. Jerome Robbins contributed four, including In G Major, originally known as Concerto in G.

In January, Robbins approached Suzanne Farrell about dancing in In G Major. Farrell had just returned to the New York City Ballet following years-long absence caused by a fallout with Balanchine in 1969, and she performed with Maurice Béjart's Ballet of the 20th Century in the interim. Despite being the star of the company, previously, the only times Farrell had performed in a Robbins ballet was during her first year at the company, as a trumpet in Fanfare. In her biography, Farrell attributed this to Robbins' absence at the company during the 1960s, only to return about the same time as her departure. Robbins' biographer Amanda Vaill suggested another possible reason was Farrell's strong association with Balanchine, which she acknowledged, "I think [Robbins] saw me differently because I had been [Balanchine's] inspiration. I had a history." Robbins paired Farrell with Peter Martins.

Robbins often juggled between different versions of the choreography and different cast before settling on one. For In G Major, Robbins had developed the central pas de deux on Sara Leland and Bart Cook, before bringing it to Farrell and Martins. Farrell was unfamiliar with this process and "did not particularly like the audition atmosphere that was sure to encourage insecurity all around", but also noted Robbins was "polite, helpful, and accommodating", and she enjoyed dancing the pas de deux. Martins recalled Robbins "constantly made clear how interested he was in us as dancers, and that he had no ideal notion of what this piece absolutely must be like." On her overall experience working with Robbins, Farrell said it did not confirm Robbins' reputation as a "supposedly temperamental and demanding choreographer."

In G Major, under its original title Concerto in G, had a preview performance at a gala benefit on May 14, 1975, before the official premiere the following day, which was also Farrell's first performance since returning to the New York City Ballet. The ballet was renamed to its current title in the fall that year. The ballet originally used costumes and scenery designed by Rouben Ter-Arutunian.

In G Major entered the repertory of the Paris Opera Ballet later that year, under the title En Sol. The Paris production featured costumes and scenery designed by the artist Erté that suggested a French Riviera setting. The New York City Ballet acquired the Erté set and costumes in 1984, and continues to use them for the ballet.

== Original cast ==
- Suzanne Farrell
- Peter Martins
- Muriel Aasen
- Judith Fugate
- Dolores Houston
- Sandra Jennings
- Catherine Morris
- Terri Lee Port
- Tracy Bennett
- Victor Castelli
- Hermes Condé
- Laurence Matthews
- Jay Jolley
- Peter Naumann

== Critical reception ==
Clive Barnes of the New York Times commented, "Where Mr Robbins has been especially adept and adroit is in fitting the dances to the weight and the mass of the music, and his sense of the music's structure is particularly pleasing." However, in her biography of Robbins, Amanda Vaill stated the reception to In G Major was mixed.
