= Chuck Versus the Cat Squad =

- Chuck episode
- The C.A.T. Squad
- Episode no.: Season 4 Episode 15
- Directed by: Paul Marks
- Written by: Nicholas Wootton
- Production code: 3X6315
- Original air date: February 14, 2011

Guest appearances
- Lou Diamond Phillips as Augusto Gaez; Mircea Monroe as Amy; Mercedes Masohn as Zondra; Mini Anden as Carina Miller; Mekenna Melvin as Alex McHugh

Episode chronology
← Previous "Chuck Versus the Seduction Impossible"	Next → "Chuck Versus the Masquerade"

"Chuck Versus the Cat Squad" is the fifteenth episode of the fourth season of Chuck. It originally aired on February 14, 2011. As a surprise, Chuck Bartowski reunites Sarah Walker with her old spy team, the eponymous "C.A.T. Squad", which includes Carina Miller (Mini Anden). The squad flies to Rio de Janeiro to face off against their nemesis Augusto Gaez (Lou Diamond Phillips), but old grudges start to get in the way of the mission. Elsewhere, Morgan Grimes' relationship with Alex McHugh (Mekenna Melvin) is threatened by Carina's return.

== Plot ==
The episode begins with a flashback to 2003, when Sarah Walker was part of the CIA’s Clandestine Attack Team (C.A.T. Squad), alongside Carina Miller, Zondra, and Amy. The squad disbanded after Sarah found a hidden transmitter in Zondra’s boot, accusing her of being a traitor. This scene is revealed to be Morgan Grimes’ imagination as Chuck Bartowski explains the story.

Wanting to surprise Sarah, Chuck invites the C.A.T. Squad to their engagement party, despite Sarah’s discomfort. Carina contacts Amy and Zondra, and the squad arrives by helicopter to take Sarah out for a night of partying. The next morning, Sarah returns, expressing her concern about trust issues within the squad, especially regarding Zondra. As the group leaves, Sarah’s car explodes, injuring Carina. Chuck flashes on a piece of the bomb, discovering that Augusto Gaez, a terrorist-for-hire and the squad’s nemesis, is responsible. General Beckman assigns the C.A.T. Squad to capture Gaez and extradite him.

The squad infiltrates Gaez’s party in Rio de Janeiro, with Chuck, John Casey, and Morgan providing support. While Chuck reviews CIA files to investigate Zondra’s potential guilt, the squad is captured by Gaez’s men. Sarah declines Gaez’s offer to join his organization, and when he prepares to kill her, she frees herself and demands to know the identity of the double agent. Before Gaez can answer, Chuck interrupts, leading to a chaotic fight. Gaez is arrested, but Sarah remains frustrated by the unresolved betrayal.

Sarah and Zondra, still suspicious of each other, engage in a sparring match to settle their differences. Meanwhile, Casey interrogates Gaez, who denies involvement with the betrayal. Sarah and Zondra eventually realize that Amy is the real traitor. Amy incapacitates Casey, frees Gaez, and attacks Sarah and Zondra. In the ensuing fight, Chuck uses his flashing ability to defeat Gaez, and the squad apprehends Amy.

Afterward, Sarah reconciles with Zondra and Carina, asking them to be her bridesmaids. Later, at Chuck and Sarah’s engagement party, Sarah also asks Ellie Bartowski to be her maid of honor, which Ellie gladly accepts.

Meanwhile, Morgan struggles with Carina’s attempts to disrupt his relationship with Alex, but he ultimately declares his love for Alex, solidifying their relationship despite Carina’s interference.

== Music ==
Songs listed by Alan Sepinwall.

- "Turn It On" by Franz Ferdinand
- "The Parade" by Daniel Indart
- "Eu Quero Agora" by Josephine Bauza
- "Pra Rua" by Rio Funk
- "Rockers to Swallow" by the Yeah Yeah Yeahs
- "Belongings" by Clock Opera
- "Please Ask for Help" by Telekinesis

== Reception ==
"Chuck Versus the Cat Squad" drew 5.64 million viewers.

The episode received positive reviews from critics, though most criticized the predictability that Amy was the traitor. Eric Goldman of IGN gave this episode a score of 8 out of 10, writing, "The opening sequence establishing the CAT Squad (Clandestine Attack Team, of course) was great – a lot of Charlie's Angels mixed with a voice over that was a bit more Hart to Hart, keeping in line that it was Morgan imagining this." Golmdan continued "For now, this was a fun installment, albeit not as inspired as last week."

HitFix writer Alan Sepinwall wrote, "We seem to be falling into a pattern with these bifurcated 'Chuck' seasons, wherein the original 13 episode arc wraps up, and then we get some fun standalones for a bit. 'Chuck vs. the Cat Squad' even had an opening sequence similar in style to the opening of last year's 15th episode, 'Chuck vs. the Role Models,' this time with Morgan imagining Sarah's old team as the stars of a 'Charlie's Angels'-type drama (after last time he dreamed about Chuck and Sarah in 'Hart to Hart.')" Sepinwall concluded, "I'm sure the search into Sarah's past is going to turn into a big arc in and of itself, but for now I'm just happy to have some light, entertaining 'Chuck' episodes."

This episode was rated 8.9 out of 10 by the users of TV.com
