= Chuck Versus the Anniversary =

- Chuck episode
- Mary delivers the final blow to Marco.
- Episode no.: Season 4 Episode 1
- Directed by: Robert Duncan McNeill
- Written by: Chris Fedak
- Original air date: September 20, 2010

Guest appearances
- Linda Hamilton as Mary Elizabeth Bartowski; Larry Cedar as an interviewer; Katie Cleary as Laura; Dolph Lundgren as Marco; Olivia Munn as "Greta"; Harry Dean Stanton as Harry; Joshua Rush as a young Chuck Bartowski

Episode chronology
← Previous "Chuck Versus the Ring: Part II"	Next → "Chuck Versus the Suitcase"

"Chuck Versus the Anniversary" is the fourth season premiere of Chuck. It originally aired September 20, 2010. When the CIA gains control over the Buy More, Chuck Bartowski begins searching for his mother (Linda Hamilton). Sarah and Casey follow a trail to Russia as they investigate the mysterious Volkoff Industries and its operative, Marco (Dolph Lundgren). Back at home, Ellie delivers big news to her family.

== Plot ==
In 1994, Mary Bartowski reads young Chuck a bedtime story, foreshadowing her secret life as a spy. In the present, Chuck finds his father’s research confirming Mary’s role in espionage. He and Morgan begin a secret mission to locate her, keeping it hidden from Sarah and Casey. After traveling the world, they find an empty safe in Mary’s Los Angeles hideout, but a Chinese restaurant menu offers a clue. Chuck considers giving up, unaware that Mary is watching them through a security camera.

Meanwhile, their reckless spy endeavors leave Chuck and Morgan in severe debt. Struggling to find a job, Chuck is repeatedly sabotaged by General Beckman, who eventually forcibly reinstates him and Morgan into the CIA. At the Buy More, now a CIA/NSA base, Chuck flashes on an EMP device connected to Volkoff Industries, matching the restaurant logo on the menu. This discovery leads them to a facility in Venezuela, but they realize the logo is tied to a Moscow operation.

Sarah and Casey, in Hong Kong tracking a Volkoff EMP device, end up in Moscow after being captured by Marko, a Volkoff operative. Simultaneously, Chuck and Morgan infiltrate Volkoff’s Moscow base to retrieve information on Mary. Through text messaging, they discover Sarah and Casey are imprisoned in the same facility. Despite the building being sealed, Team Bartowski uses the EMP to escape, sacrificing vital data on Mary’s whereabouts. After their successful escape, Sarah and Casey agree to help Chuck continue his search for Mary.

Back in Burbank, Chuck plans to tell his sister Ellie about rejoining the CIA, but she surprises him with news of her pregnancy, causing him to withhold his secrets for now.

Later, Marko reports to Mary that her family is searching for her. In response, Mary swiftly kills Marko and his men, escaping to remain hidden.

At the newly rebuilt Buy More, staffed by CIA operatives, General Beckman reassigns Chuck and Morgan to full-time operative duties. They are dropped into the revamped Castle base, fully recommitting to their mission of finding Mary and bringing down Volkoff.

== Production ==
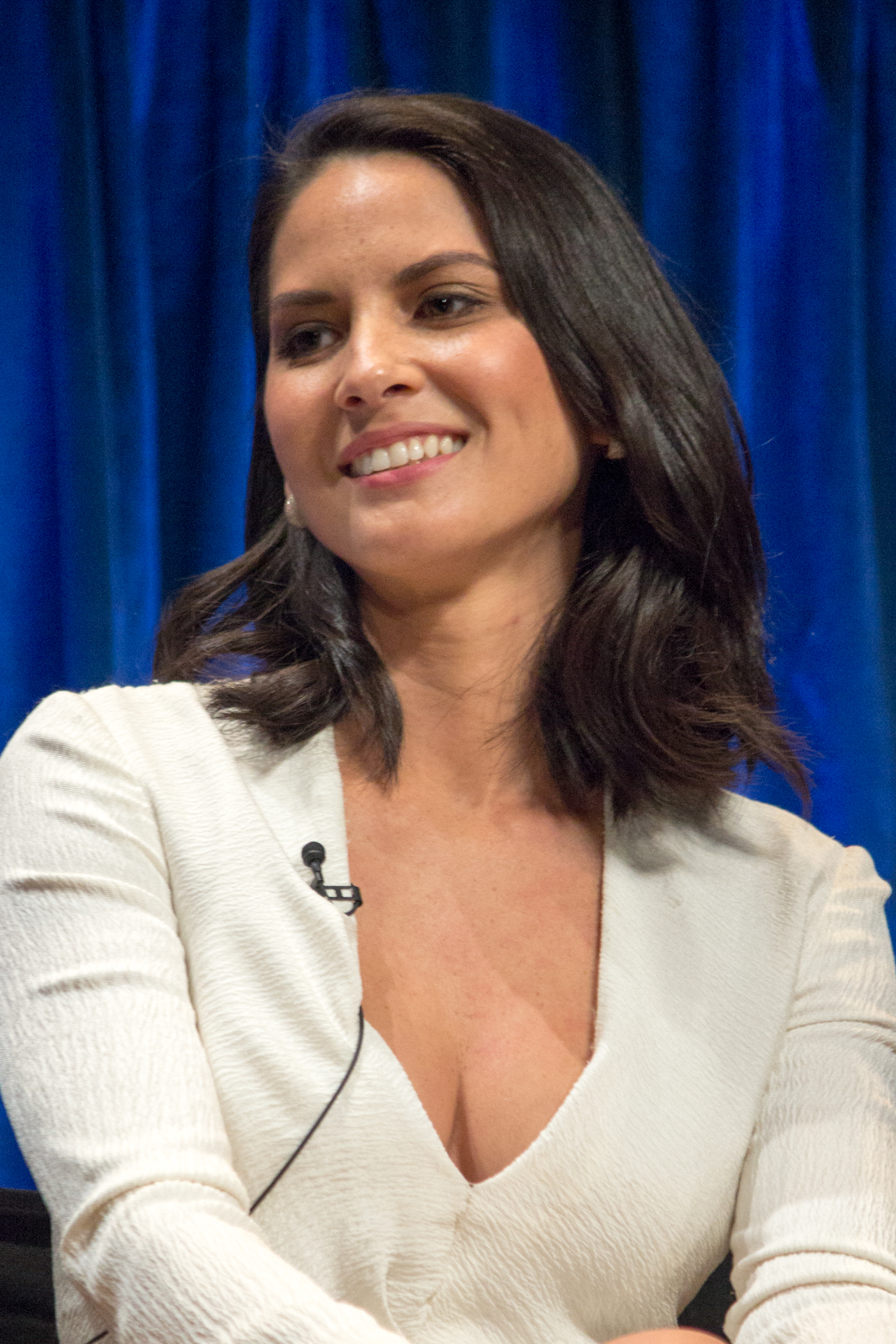
Olivia Munn portrayed the first Greta

At San Diego Comic-Con in 2010, Josh Schwartz and Chris Fedak announced that from season four the Buy More will be run by the CIA as a base of operations (much like the Orange Orange was in Season Two and Three) with an agent named Greta working undercover as a Buy More executive and "badass greenshirt." This episode introduced the rotating character of Greta, portrayed by Olivia Munn.

=== Continuity ===
- This episode takes place nine months after Chuck and Sarah started dating in "Chuck Versus the Other Guy".
- Morgan makes the same mistake that Chuck does in "Chuck Versus the Honeymooners" by using an alias that has essentially the same first and last names.

=== Flashes ===
- Chuck locates Volkoff's Venezuela facility after a flash on the EMP device.
- A flash on "Shimira Chicken" tips off Chuck that the Chinese restaurant menu is in fact a means of selling weaponry.
- Chuck flashes on a floor plan while at Volkoff Industries and sees that the building is a former KGB facility.
- Chuck flashes (off-screen) on kung-fu for the first time in months to subdue Volkoff's men.

== Cultural references ==
- Actor Dolph Lundgren twice references his role as Ivan Drago in the film Rocky IV. When preparing to torture Casey and Sarah, he uses Drago's famous quote, "I must break you." He later references Drago again when saying of the team, "If you die, you die." The character was previously referenced by name in "Chuck Versus the Final Exam".
- The travel sequence at the beginning of this episode makes several references to popular culture:
  - Raiders of the Lost Ark - The travel map references the map used throughout the Indiana Jones series. The map used by the episode was also created by Dan Curry, who also created those for the Jones films.
  - I Spy - The shadow silhouettes.
  - The Avengers - Morgan posing with an umbrella.
- Harry Dean Stanton plays a repo man, referencing a previous role.
- Chuck interviews at "Vandalay Industries", a reference to Seinfeld.
- While Mary finishes reading "The Frost Queen" in 1994, a close-up shows Superman, Batman, the Joker, and Transformers action figures with Chuck's token Tron poster.
- Chuck's trip through the tube slide recalls that of James Bond in Japan from You Only Live Twice, both in respect to the tunnel's appearance, and the protagonist being lured into the trap door by another protagonist. The scene also is a nod to a similar scene involving Luke Skywalker on the Bespin Cloud City in The Empire Strikes Back, both aesthetically and that it was immediately preceded by the protagonist's (Luke/Chuck) refusal to work for his nemesis (Darth Vader/Beckman).
- Chuck says "I am a smooth operator like Sade" referring to Sade's song "Smooth Operator".
- When Chuck says they have to go to Russia, Morgan tells him he'll have to sell the Millennium Falcon, another reference to Star Wars.
- The scene with a bus serving as a "getaway car" features in its background the Golden Gate, one of the historical landmarks of Kyiv, Ukraine.

== Critical response ==
- IGN gave this episode a score of 8 out of 10.
