= Noah Fleiss =

American film and television actor (born 1984)

- Born: April 16, 1984 (age 42); White Plains, New York, U.S.
- Occupations: Actor, voice actor
- Years active: 1990-2018

Noah Fleiss (born April 16, 1984) is an American actor. He began his career as a child actor, making his film debut as the eponymous Sam Whitney in Josh and S.A.M. (1993). Subsequently, he played the title character in Joe the King (1999) and appeared in Brick (2005). Outside of his film roles, Fleiss portrayed one of the eight playable characters in the video game Until Dawn (2015).

Born in White Plains, New York, Fleiss' great uncle is Professor Joseph L. Fleiss, and he is a distant relative of Dr. Paul Fleiss, Mike Fleiss, and Heidi Fleiss.

== Career ==
Fleiss made his screen debut as a young runaway (Sam Whitney) who drives cross-country with his brother in Josh and S.A.M. (1993). He also has appeared in films such as Joe the King (1999), The Laramie Project (2002), and Brick (2005), in which he portrayed the intimidating Tug. Television appearances include Touched by an Angel, Law & Order, Law & Order: Special Victims Unit, and Fringe.

In 2015, Fleiss was cast as one of eight playable characters, Christopher “Chris” Hartley, in an interactive drama horror game, Until Dawn, developed by Supermassive Games.

In 1996, Fleiss was awarded The Hollywood Reporter's YoungStar Award for Best Performance by a Young Actor in a TV Movie or Miniseries for his performance in A Mother's Prayer opposite Linda Hamilton. He was named Jane magazine's "Star of Tomorrow" in 2002 and Nylon magazine's "Next Ed Norton".

== Filmography ==
=== Film ===
Year	Title	Role	Notes
1993	Josh and S.A.M.	Sam	
1995	Roommates	Michael at age 5	
1997	Bad Day on the Block	Zach Braverton	
1999	Joe the King	Joe Henry	
2000	Things You Can Tell Just by Looking at Her	Jay (segment "Someone For Rose")	
2000	Double Parked	Bret	
2001	Storytelling	Brady Livingston	(segment "Non-Fiction")
2001	The Favor	Steve	Short film
2003	Bringing Rain	Marcus Swords	
2004	Evergreen	Chat	
2005	Brick	Tugger	
2006	Off the Black	Todd Hunter	
2006	Day on Fire		
2006	Hard Luck	Sol Rosenbaum	Video
2007	Mother's Day Massacre	Bobby	
2007	The Speed of Life	Vincent	
2008	Red Canyon	Harley	
2009	Further Lane	Ben	Short film
2008	Capers	Eric	
2010	Beware the Gonzo	Ryan	
2010	Consent	Ryan	
2011	11:11	Derek	Video
2012	Dead Souls	Mack	
2015	No Letting Go	Sasha	
2016	The Last Film Festival	Stoner	
2018	Patient 001	Eddie / Handyman-son	

=== Television ===
Year	Title	Role	Notes
1990	The Baby-Sitters Club	Andrew Brewer	Episode: "Mary Ann and the Brunettes"
1995	A Mother's Prayer	T.J. Holmstrom	Television film
1995	Past the Bleachers	Charlie	Television film
1996	Chasing the Dragon	Sean Kessler	Television film
1996	An Unexpected Family	Matt Whitney	Television film
1998	Touched by an Angel	Aaron Gibson	Episode: "How Do You Spell Faith?"
1998	An Unexpected Life	Matt Whitney	Television film
2000	The Truth About Jane	Ned	Television film
2002	The Laramie Project	Shannon Shingleton	Television film
2002	Law & Order	Denny Cannon	Episode: "Girl Most Likely"
2003	Ed	Joe Risby	Episode: "The Offer"
2008	Huge	Ivan	—N/a
2009	Taking Chance	Army Sergeant	Television film
2009	Fringe	Luke Dempsey	Episode: "The No-Brainer"
2010	Three Rivers	Sam Heaton	Episode: "Win-Loss"
2014	Blue Bloods	Paul	Episode: "Partners"
2004, 2016	Law & Order: SVU	Nat Dennehy/Nathan Angeli	Episode: "Brotherhood" & "Catfishing Teacher"

=== Video games ===
Year	Game	Role	Notes
2015, 2024	Until Dawn	Christopher "Chris" Hartley	Voice and motion capture performance

=== Music videos ===
Year	Title	Performer	Role	Notes
2009	"Waking The Demon"	Bullet for My Valentine	Todd Skinner (Bully)	Cameo
