= Conor Donovan =

Conor Donovan may refer to:

- Conor Donovan (actor) (born 1991), American actor
- Conor Donovan (soccer) (born 1996), American soccer player
