= Dwight Henry (actor) =

American actor, baker, and businessman (born 1962)

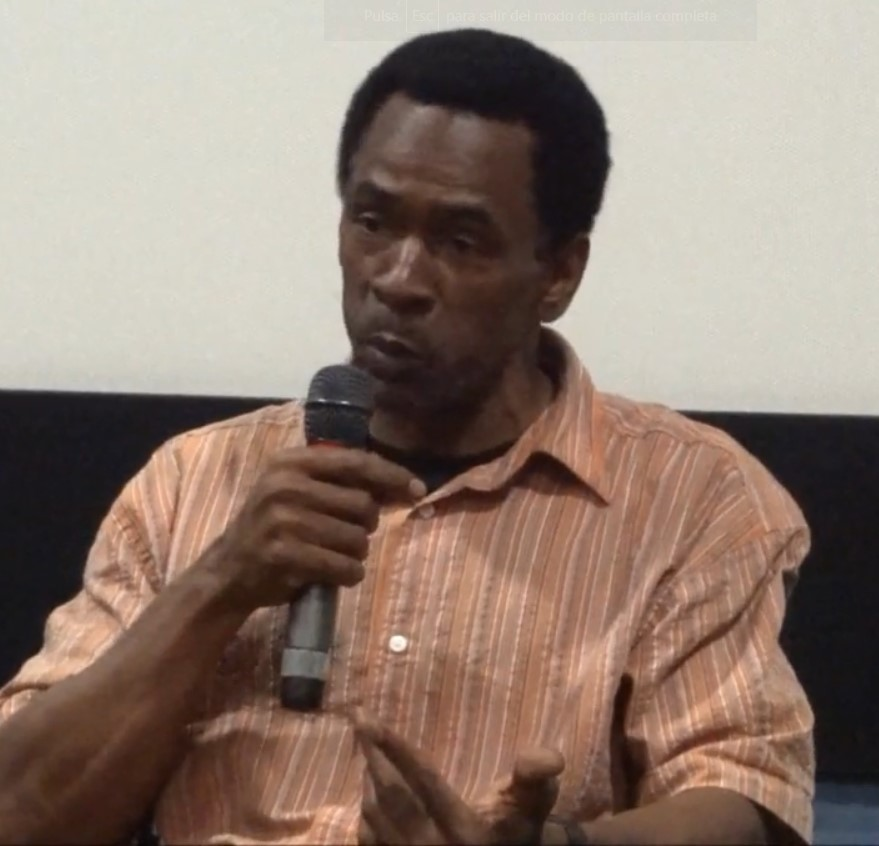
- Henry in 2012
- Born: 1962 (age 62–63); Nashville, Tennessee
- Occupation(s): Actor, baker, businessman

Dwight Henry (born 1962) is an American actor, baker, and businessman. He is best known for his role as Wink, Hushpuppy's father, in the film Beasts of the Southern Wild (2012). Additionally, Henry is the founder of the Buttermilk Drop Bakery in New Orleans.

== Life and career ==
Born in Nashville, Tennessee, Henry moved to New Orleans, Louisiana, when he was a young child. Having lived there through adulthood, he founded Henry's Bakery and Deli near his home in the historic Tremé neighborhood. The bakery was successful enough that Henry planned to open a second location of his store, until Hurricane Katrina changed his plans.

Though he had no professional training or experience as an actor, the filmmakers of Beasts of the Southern Wild cast him in the film, while allowing him to operate his bakery regularly during shooting. Henry earned positive reviews for the film, which was nominated for the Academy Award for Best Picture, but insists that his primary career is managing his bakery, now called the Buttermilk Drop Bakery. He agreed to open a second location of his store in Harlem in the near future.

He continued his acting career and appeared in Steve McQueen's 12 Years a Slave (2013).

== Filmography ==
Year	Title	Role	Notes
2012	Beasts of the Southern Wild	Wink	Los Angeles Film Critics Association Award for Best Supporting Actor; Nominated - Black Reel Award for Outstanding Supporting Actor; Nominated - Black Reel Award for Outstanding Breakthrough Performance; Nominated - Chicago Film Critics Association Award for Best Supporting Actor; Nominated - Chicago Film Critics Association Award for Most Promising Performer; Nominated - NAACP Image Award for Best Supporting Actor; Nominated - Online Film Critics Society Award for Best Supporting Actor; Nominated - Phoenix Film Critics Society Award for Breakthrough Performance
2013	12 Years a Slave	Uncle Abram	
2015	Navy Seals vs. Zombies	Armed civilian	
2016	The Birth of a Nation	Isaac Turner	
2018	Warning Shot	Jawari	
2018	Boo!	Memphis	
2019	Easy Does It	Chief Parker	
2020	Curtis	Curtis	
2022	The Legend of Firelily	Clerk	Episode: "Daddy's Girl"
2024	Undying	Dr. Poe	
