= William Olvis =

- Birth name: William Patrick Olvis
- Born: December 23, 1957 Portland, Oregon, U.S.
- Died: May 6, 2014 (aged 56) Malibu, California, U.S.
- Genres: Film music
- Occupation: Composer

William Patrick Olvis (December 23, 1957 – May 6, 2014) was an American composer for film and television. His most famous compositions were those for TV series Dr Quinn, Medicine Woman and Gabriel's Fire, then Pros and Cons.

He began his professional career in 1988 composing the score for the ABC telefilm Evil in Clear River and went on to compose and work on the scores for many TV series and films including Kill Me Again, 29th Street, Red Rock West, Separate Lives and Steal Big Steal Little.

== Personal life ==
Olvis' father, William Edward Olvis, was an actor and renowned opera singer. His mother, Dorothy Dallas Farnum, was also a renowned opera singer. Olvis had two brothers, Hugo and Steve, as well as two sisters, Yvette and Natasha. He was divorced from wife, Cathleen Young.

He died of throat cancer aged 56 at his home in Malibu, California.
