= Boo! (2018 film) =

- Film poster
- Directed by: Luke Jaden
- Written by: Luke Jaden; Diane Michelle
- Produced by: Phil Wurtzel; Ele Bardha
- Starring: Jaden Piner; Rob Zabrecky; Aurora Perrineau; Charley Palmer Rothwell; Dwight Henry; Jill Marie Jones
- Production companies: Midland Entertainment; Bardha Productions
- Distributed by: Vertical Entertainment
- Release date: October 14, 2018 (Brooklyn Horror Film Festival)
- Country: United States
- Language: English

Boo! is a 2018 American horror film directed by Luke Jaden and starring Jaden Piner, Rob Zabrecky, Aurora Perrineau, Charley Palmer Rothwell, Dwight Henry and Jill Marie Jones. It is Jaden's feature directorial debut.

== Cast ==
- Jaden Piner
- Jill Marie Jones
- Aurora Perrineau
- Charley Palmer Rothwell
- Dwight Henry
- Rob Zabrecky

== Release ==
The film premiered at the Brooklyn Horror Film Festival on October 14, 2018. Vertical Entertainment acquired North American distribution to the film in March 2019. The film was released on April 12, 2019 in limited theaters and on VOD.

== Reception ==
Anya Stanley of Dread Central awarded the film three stars out of five. Bradley Gibson of Film Threat gave the film an 8 out of 10.
