= Amanda Vaill =

American screenwriter

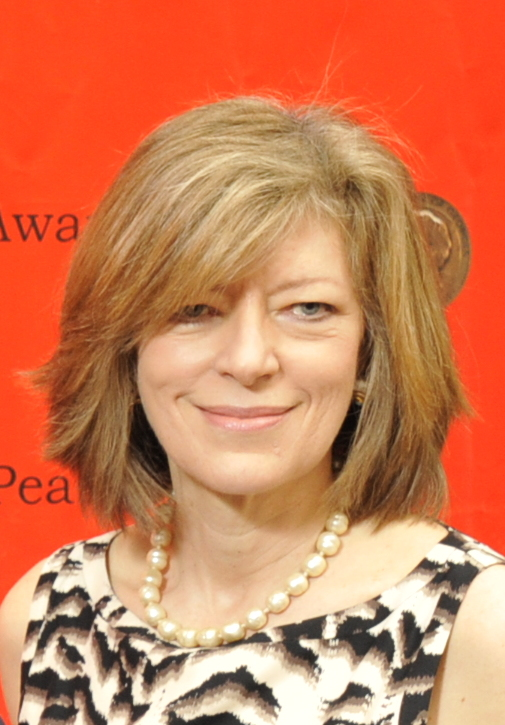
Vaill at the 69th Annual Peabody Awards

Amanda Vaill is an American screenwriter, writer, and editor, noted for her non-fiction. She was shortlisted for the National Book Critics’ Circle Award. She was a fellow of the Guggenheim Foundation, Center for Ballet and the Arts at NYU, and the Cullman Center for Scholars and Writers.

== Life ==
A graduate of Harvard University, she worked in publishing before becoming a writer full-time in 1992. In the 1970s Vaill was an editor at Viking Press alongside Jacqueline Kennedy Onassis.

In 1995 Vaill published Everybody Was So Young, a biography of Gerald and Sara Murphy, prominent 1920s socialites of the French Riviera. It was nominated for the 1995 National Book Critics Circle Award in biography. She also contributed to the catalogue for Making It New: The Art and Style of Sara and Gerald Murphy, an exhibition mounted by the Williams College Museum of Art, and also shown at the Yale Art Gallery and the Dallas Museum of Art. Her next book was Somewhere, a biography of choreographer Jerome Robbins. Vaill was awarded a Guggenheim Fellowship in 2000 for her work on Robbins.

Vaill wrote Something to Dance About a 2009 PBS documentary about Robbins life and work. It was broadcast as part of PBS's American Masters series and directed by Judy Kinberg. Vaill was nominated for the 2009 Emmy Award for Outstanding Writing for Nonfiction Programming for Something to Dance About, and the film won both an Emmy and a George Foster Peabody Award. The 2000 television film Sex & Mrs. X, starring Linda Hamilton, was based on a 1999 article Vaill wrote for Allure.

In 2008 Vaill co-wrote a book on her grandfather, the jeweller Seaman Schepps. Her new book is on the personalities associated with Madrid's Hotel Florida during the Spanish Civil War.

Vaill has also written for Esquire, The New York Observer, Talk, Harper’s Bazaar, Architectural Digest among others.

Vaill won the 2026 Pulitzer Prize for Biography for Pride and Pleasure.

She lives in New York City.

== Bibliography ==
- Everybody was So Young. Boston: Houghton Mifflin. 1998. ISBN 978-0-395-65241-1.
- Somewhere. New York, NY: Broadway. 2006. ISBN 978-0-7679-0420-9.
- Vaill, Amanda; Zapata, Janet (2004-09-01). Seaman Schepps. New York: Vendome Press. ISBN 978-0-86565-239-2.
- Hotel Florida: Truth, Love, and Death in the Spanish Civil War. New York: Macmillan. 2014-04-22. ISBN 978-0-374-17299-2.
- Pride and Pleasure: The Schuyler Sisters in an Age of Revolution. New York: Farrar, Straus & Giroux. 2025-10-21. ISBN 978-0-374-25437-7.

=== As editor ===
- 1994 - O Henry: Selected Stories
