= Josh and S.A.M. =

1993 film by Billy Weber

- Theatrical release poster
- Directed by: Billy Weber
- Written by: Frank Deese
- Produced by: Martin Brest
- Starring: Jacob Tierney; Noah Fleiss; Joan Allen; Stephen Tobolowsky; Chris Penn; Martha Plimpton
- Cinematography: Don Burgess
- Edited by: Chris Lebenzon
- Music by: Thomas Newman
- Production companies: Castle Rock Entertainment; New Line Cinema
- Distributed by: Columbia Pictures
- Release date: November 24, 1993
- Running time: 98 minutes
- Country: United States
- Language: English
- Budget: $18 million
- Box office: $1.6 million

Josh and S.A.M. is a 1993 American road comedy-drama film starring Noah Fleiss (in his film debut), Jacob Tierney, and Martha Plimpton. The film is about two young brothers who run away from home due to emotional conflict over the divorce of their parents. It was directed by Billy Weber and produced by Martin Brest. The film was released by Columbia Pictures on November 24, 1993, receiving negative reviews from critics and was a box office bomb, grossing $1.6 million against an $18 million budget.

== Plot ==
Twelve-year-old Josh Whitney and his younger brother Sam have left their mother's house in California to go stay with their father Thom and his new family in Orlando, Florida. Their mother is engaged to a man named Jean-Pierre.

While Josh and Sam are eating dinner with Thom and his family, their stepbrothers Curtis and Leon tease Josh, saying he is gay, which makes him cry. Thom begins to realize that Josh is jealous of his stepbrothers because of the attention Thom gives them. Josh unintentionally brainwashes Sam, making him believe that he is a genetically designed child warrior and that his name is an acronym for "Strategically Altered Mutant".

Thom tells Josh and Sam that they have to fly back to California to retrieve their belongings, because their mother and Jean-Pierre are planning on moving to Europe for a year. On the way to California, a thunderstorm grounds the boys’ flight in Dallas, forcing them to stay in a hotel for the night. Josh abandons Sam at the hotel and crashes a high-school reunion, falsely claiming that his mother was a graduate of the school. After Josh meets a drunk man named Derek, Sam arrives. Derek tells the boys to call him "Dad."

Derek drives the boys to a house. Hoping to call the police, Josh breaks into the house, and Derek pursues him. Sam hits Derek with a billiard ball and Josh hits him with a cue stick, knocking him unconscious. Fearing they murdered Derek, the boys flee in Derek's rental car and drive across the Western United States, where they encounter the runaway Alison. She joins the boys on their journey as they evade the authorities, eventually entering Canada illegally through a fence.

Feeling unwanted, Josh decides to stay in Canada. He sends Sam on a flight back to Orlando, then calls Derek and finds out he is alive. Arriving in Orlando, Sam tells Thom that Josh is in Canada and that nobody likes him because of his behavior. Thom replies that he will always love Josh no matter what, and that he loves being a father to him and Sam. Josh then returns to Orlando and reunites with Sam and Thom.

== Cast ==
- Jacob Tierney as Joshua "Josh" Whitney, the older brother of Sam
- Noah Fleiss as Samuel "Sam" / "Killer Sam" Whitney, the younger brother of Josh
- Stephen Tobolowsky as Thomas "Thom" Whitney, Josh and Sam's father
- Joan Allen as Caroline Whitney LaTourette, Josh and Sam's mother
- Martha Plimpton as Alison the Liberty Maid
- Chris Penn as Derek Baxter
- Maury Chaykin as Pizza Man
- Udo Kier as Tanning Salon Manager
- Ronald Guttman as Jean-Pierre "J.P." LaTourette, Josh & Sam's stepfather
- Ann Hearn as Teacher
- Anne Lange as Ellen Coleman Whitney, Josh & Sam's stepmother
- Sean Baca as Curtis Coleman, Josh & Sam's first stepbrother
- Jake Gyllenhaal as Leon Coleman, Josh & Sam's second stepbrother
- Amy Wright as Waitress
- Brent Hinkley as Bill at Reunion

== Production ==
Principal photography began on August 3, 1992. Filming locations include Billings, Montana, Laurel, Montana, and along Highway 3 in Yellowstone County. Other parts of the film were shot in Salt Lake City, Arches National Park, Highway 191, Lisbon Valley, and Spanish Valley in Utah and Calgary, Canada. Filming lasted for 69 days and concluded on October 11, 1992.

== Release ==
The film premiered on November 24, 1993, at Planet Hollywood in New York City. Jacob Tierney, Noah Fleiss, and their families attended the premiere, but none of the other actors and none of the crew members attended it.

The film was released on home video on April 27, 1994, by New Line Home Video, followed by a reissue from PolyGram Video in 1998. While the film was never released on DVD or Blu-ray, a digital version is available to rent or purchase on Amazon Prime Video; an HD and 4K fan-upscale had also been uploaded to YouTube.

== Reception ==
On the review aggregator website Rotten Tomatoes, 29% of 7 critics' reviews are positive, with an average rating of 4.9/10.
