= Zoe Weizenbaum =

American actress (born 1991)

Zoë Weizenbaum
- Born: September 21, 1991 (age 35); Seattle, Washington, U.S.
- Education: Mount Holyoke College Middlebury College
- Occupation: Actress
- Years active: 2005–2008

Zoë Weizenbaum (born September 21, 1991) is an American former actress, most recognized for her roles in Missing in America (2005), Memoirs of a Geisha and 12 and Holding.

== Early life ==
Weizenbaum was born in Seattle, Washington to a Jewish mother and a Chinese father. She is the granddaughter of computer scientist Joseph Weizenbaum (1923–2008). From the age of two, she grew up in Amherst, Massachusetts. She studied African Dance and participated in Amherst's local musical theater productions.

== Career ==
She was called for an audition for Missing in America after someone saw her perform in a local production of Peter Pan. For this role, she received the Angel Award for Best Actress at the Monaco International Film Festival in 2005. She has also had roles in 12 and Holding, directed by Michael Cuesta and in Memoirs of a Geisha, directed by Rob Marshall.

== Personal life ==
Weizenbaum attended Amherst Regional High School for her freshman year, before she decided to return to Pioneer Valley Performing Arts Charter Public School, where she went to middle school. Weizenbaum speaks Mandarin, learning through the Rosetta Stone program and intensive Chinese courses at Mount Holyoke College and the Middlebury Language Schools. From 2010 to 2011, Weizenbaum attended Middlebury and studied Japanese. She later majored in Chinese, graduating from Mount Holyoke College in 2014. From 2015 to 2017, Weizenbaum studied at the National Cheng Kung University’s Chinese Language Center in Taiwan. Upon returning to the United States, she began co-operating with Ancient Ponies Farm, a permaculture homestead, with her mother in Shutesbury, Massachusetts.

== Filmography ==
Year	Title	Role	Notes
2005	Missing in America	Lenny Hocknell	
2005	12 and Holding	Malee Chuang	
2005	Memoirs of a Geisha	Young Pumpkin	
2008	Assassination of a High School President	Female Writer	
