= Curtis (film) =

- Directed by: Chris Bailey
- Written by: Chris Bailey
- Produced by: Chelsea Davenport; Kimberly Hwang; Desi Bee Richardson
- Starring: Dwight Henry; Alex Henderson
- Distributed by: 1091 Pictures
- Release date: November 2, 2021
- Running time: 80 minutes
- Country: United States
- Language: English

Curtis is a 2021 American sports drama film written and directed by Chris Bailey and starring Dwight Henry and Alex Henderson. It is Bailey's feature directorial debut.

== Cast ==
- Dwight Henry as Curtis
- Alex Henderson as Dre

== Release ==
The film was released on November 2, 2021.

== Reception ==
Dwight Brown of the National Newspaper Publishers Association awarded the film three stars.

== Awards ==
The film won the Jury Award for Best U.S. Narrative at the American Black Film Festival and the Audience Award at the Atlanta Film Festival.
