= Joe the King =

- Directed by: Frank Whaley
- Written by: Frank Whaley
- Produced by: Jennifer Dewis; Scott Macaulay; Lindsay Marx; Robin O'Hara
- Starring: Noah Fleiss; Karen Young; Camryn Manheim; Austin Pendleton; John Leguizamo; Ethan Hawke; Val Kilmer
- Distributed by: Trimark Pictures
- Release date: January 22, 1999
- Running time: 100 minutes
- Country: United States
- Language: English

Joe the King is a 1999 drama film, written and directed by Frank Whaley, based largely on his own childhood and the childhood of his brother. It stars Noah Fleiss, Val Kilmer, Karen Young, Ethan Hawke, John Leguizamo, Austin Pendleton, Camryn Manheim, Max Ligosh, and James Costa. The film premiered at the 1999 Sundance Film Festival, where it won Whaley the Waldo Salt Screenwriting Award (tied with Guinevere) and a nomination for the Grand Jury Prize. It also got a nomination for the Open Palm Award from the Gotham Awards. Noah Fleiss also received a Young Artist Award nomination for Best Leading Actor in a Feature Film.

== Plot ==
The story takes place in Upstate New York during the 1970s. Fourteen-year-old Joe Henry has spent his life in an abusive household. His father, Bob, is a raging, violent alcoholic, while his mother, Theresa, feels too stressed to pay attention to him and lives in fear of getting caught in the path of her husband's wrath. His brother, Mike, about a year older, is normal and friendly, but offers no affirmative guidance. He mostly ignores Joe as he does not want the association of Joe's natural uncoolness (as well as the rest of his family) ruining his attempts to get into the "in" crowd. Joe is taunted by his classmates, and hassled by people his father owes money to. To make matters worse, one night Bob goes off the deep end and smashes all of Theresa's records. When Joe comes home from work to discover this, Mike tells him Bob was triggered by finding condoms in Theresa's purse, implying she secretly works as a prostitute to bring in whatever additional income she can for the family, which would also explain her absence from the house the majority of the day.

In response to economic pressure, Joe takes a full-time job after school working at a local diner, leaving him tired and even less able to keep up with class work, which in turn makes him subject to mistreatment that includes beatings from his nasty teacher, who hates him entirely because she had Bob as a terrible student and hated him too). Because he is underage, Joe works there illegally, resulting in the owners exploiting him for cheap, underpaid labor and treating him rather poorly. His co-worker, Jorge, is the only person there who treats him with any kindness and frequently sticks up for him. Failing in school, Joe is assigned a guidance counselor named Leonard Coles, who, though reasonably friendly, is incompetent. For example, in their first session, when Joe starts to talk about his problems, the counselor unthinkingly shuts him off.

Throughout the movie, Joe is seen engaging in petty theft (shoplifting from stores, breaking into cars to lift items inside, and stealing from mailboxes) to raise money to pay off Bob's debts and replace Theresa's records. Also, due to his family's poverty and, as a result, likely having to go hungry most days, he is often seen stealing food from the diner to feed himself and his brother, where Jorge also makes sure he eats reasonably decent food instead of the borderline garbage he had forced himself to eat before. This reaches its climax when, one night, nearing the end of his shift, Joe learns from Jorge, who decides to leave early, that two of his bosses (a couple: Jerry and Mary) living in the apartment directly above the diner have already left and are gone for the weekend. This presents Joe an opportunity to rob the diner and acquire the money he needs.

After his shift, he sneaks in through an upstairs window and ransacks the apartment, looking for a locked metal box that was previously revealed to contain a large quantity of cash. Joe finds the box, but then catches a glimpse of himself in a doorway mirror. Horrified at what he has become, he kicks the mirror in and badly cuts his leg. Though injured, he manages to escape before another one of his bosses, an older man named Roy, who is drunkenly making his way back to the apartment to retrieve his house keys, is able to catch him.

The next day, as Joe arrives to the diner to start his shift, Jorge is outside having a smoke. He stares at Joe suspiciously, then proceeds to angrily inform Joe that he knows he was the one who broke into the place and stole the money. Sticking up for Joe as usual, however, he states he will not tell anyone that Joe was responsible. Jorge then tells him to not worry about getting caught, as Jerry and Mary believe Mary's ex-husband was responsible and Roy, having been so inebriated that night, thought Joe was a giant rat running past him and knocked him down the stairs. Jorge then tells Joe to leave and never return to avoid suspicion.

Using the stolen money, Joe buys brand new copies of Theresa's records that were destroyed by Bob and stores them in a space beneath his house with an enveloped note for his mother. Joe's plan ultimately goes south when he reveals his deed to his friend Ray, who, in turn, reveals to Coles that Joe works at the diner, prompting a concerned Coles to place a call to the diner and speaks to Jerry. Coles threatens to report Jerry and the others to the authorities for illegally employing Joe, should they not cease doing so immediately. Jerry complies, but then after Coles unwittingly reveals to him that Joe injured himself while working there by cutting his leg, Jerry correctly deduces that it was Joe who committed the robbery and calls the police.

Joe is subsequently arrested and is sentenced to a juvenile detention center for six months. Later on, as Bob drives Joe to the bus that will take Joe away, Bob uncharacteristically offers Joe his condolences and some words of advice about not making poor decisions in life and ending up a loser like Bob himself did. Joe then exits Bob's car and boards the bus. Theresa finds the replacement records Joe bought for her and is visibly moved by them. The film ends with Joe walking down the hallway of the detention center with a look of grave uncertainty on his face.

== Production ==
Whaley used French New Wave films as main models, especially The 400 Blows.

Leguizamo, who was also the executive producer, filmed his scenes for three days between Staten Island and the Broadway theater where his one-man show Freak was being staged. He was slated to direct, but he was so busy that he stepped down as director.

== Cast ==
- Noah Fleiss as Joe Henry
- Max Ligosh as Mike Henry, Joe's older brother
- Val Kilmer as Bob Henry, Joe's father
- Karen Young as Theresa Henry, Joe's mother
- James Costa as Ray
- John Leguizamo as Jorge
- Ethan Hawke as Leonard Coles
- Richard Bright as Roy
- Robert Whaley as Jerry
- Amy Wright as Mary
- Camryn Manheim as Mrs. Basil
- Kate Mara as Allyson
- Rachel Miner as Patty
- Frank Whaley as Angry Man Bob Owes Money To (uncredited)
