= Holy Water (film) =

- Directed by: Tom Reeve
- Screenplay by: Caroline O'Meara; Tom Reeve
- Story by: Michael O'Mahony
- Produced by: Nick Napier-Bell; Duncan Napier-Bell; Romain Schroeder; Frank Konigsberg
- Starring: John Lynch; Cornelius Clarke; Lochlainn O'Mearain; Cian Barry; Susan Lynch; Tiny Lister; Linda Hamilton
- Cinematography: Joost van Starrenburg
- Edited by: Adrian Murray; Sean Barton
- Music by: Franco Tortora; Tom Batoy
- Production companies: Eyeline Entertainment; Atlantic Film Distributors; Centurion Entertainment Limited; Idiom Films
- Distributed by: Centurion Entertainment (United Kingdom)
- Release dates: July 2009 (Notting Hill Film Festival); 5 February 2010 (United Kingdom)
- Running time: 89 minutes
- Countries: United Kingdom; United States
- Language: English

Holy Water (also known as Hard Times) is a 2009 sex comedy film directed by Tom Reeve and starring John Lynch, Linda Hamilton, Cornelius Clarke and Lochlainn O'Mearain. It tells the story of a group of men in a rural Irish village who hijack a truck containing Viagra with the intention of selling the drug in Amsterdam.

== Plot ==
Set in Ulster, four friends living in the tiny village of Killcoulin's Leap (once known for its spa and holy well) are tired of just scraping by. Soon to be laid-off, postman Podger comes up with the plan to hijack a truck carrying a load of Viagra and then unload it in Amsterdam.

Donal and Sean dress up as road workers and Podger and Thomas as nuns. Successfully commandeering the Pfizer truck, they find a transponder and throw it into a current bound for the Atlantic. The four at first believe they got away with it, however, American investigator Cory Williams has shown up to find the missing little blue tablets. In a panic, the friends hide the stash down the Well of the Virgin Mary, the water source for the entire town.

While the four are having their morning tea in Thomas’ hotel, both the private security company investigators and a news crew check in. The four head in search of the transponder to wipe it of prints and send it on. The investigators interrogate them shortly after they do so, but let the group go.

Sean had gone to confession, essentially broadcasting to the whole town their heist, as the priest is chatty after a drink. That night, the four are summoned to the pub. The entire parish knows and promises to keep quiet. Three months later, Killcoulin's Leap is thriving, thanks to publicity about their ‘magical waters’.

== Cast ==
- John Lynch as Tom "Gaffer" Gaffney
- Cian Barry as Sean Casey
- Cornelius Clarke as Podger Byrnes
- Lochlann Ó Mearáin as Donal O'Connell
- Susan Lynch as Geraldine Gaffney
- Deirdre Mullins as Kate Mulvey
- Stanley Townsend as Inspector Brian Hogan
- Angeline Ball as PC Anne Mooney
- Lisa Catara as Kimberley Lopez
- Veronica Quilligan as Frannie O'Dea
- Ray Callaghan as Uncle Tim
- Frank Dunne as Old Ned Lynch
- Dermot Crowley as Father Grogan
- Adam Astill as Brendan Doyle
- Tyne Rafaeli as Emily Murray
- Conor Moloney as Mike
- Dara Clear as Pat
- Tiny Lister as SixPac Jordan
- Linda Hamilton as Cory Williams
- Pascal Scott as Mihal Casey
- Marianne March as Sheila Casey
- Chrissie Cotterill as Mrs Skelly
- Kevin Moore as Auctioneer
- Christopher Dunne as Dick the Dispatch
- John Sheahan as PC Powers
- Bill Luscombe as The Farmer
