= Easy Does It (2019 film) =

- Film poster
- Directed by: Will Addison
- Written by: Will Addison; Ben Matheny
- Produced by: Lizzie Guitreau
- Starring: Bryan Batt; Dwight Henry; Linda Hamilton
- Cinematography: Bruno Doria
- Edited by: Stephen Pfeil
- Music by: Jordan Lehning
- Production companies: EFI Productions; Worklight Productions; Contessa Projects
- Distributed by: Gravitas Ventures
- Release dates: October 18, 2019 (New Orleans); July 17, 2020
- Running time: 95 minutes
- Country: United States
- Language: English

Easy Does It is a 2019 American adventure crime comedy film directed by Will Addison and starring Bryan Batt, Dwight Henry and Linda Hamilton. It is Addison's feature directorial debut. The film premiered at the 2019 New Orleans Film Festival.

== Cast ==
- Bryan Batt as Officer Owens
- Dwight Henry as Chief Parker
- Linda Hamilton as King George
- Ben Matheny as Jack Buckner
- Matthew Paul Martinez as Scottie Aldo
- Cory Dumesnil as Colin Hornsby
- Susan Gordan as Blues Eyes
- John Goodman as "Catfish" Crawford (voice)
- Harry Shearer as "Breezy" Bob McKee (voice)

== Production ==
Filming occurred in Louisiana in July 2017.

== Release ==
The film was released on VOD and digital platforms on July 17, 2020.

== Reception ==
The film has a 29% rating on Rotten Tomatoes. Josiah Teal of Film Threat gave the film a 7.5 out of 10.
