= Missing in America =

2005 film by Gabrielle Savage Dockterman

- DVD cover
- Directed by: Gabrielle Savage Dockterman
- Screenplay by: Ken Miller; Gabrielle Savage Dockterman; Nancy L. Babine
- Story by: Ken Miller
- Produced by: Gabrielle Savage Dockterman; Isen Robbins; Aimee Schoof
- Starring: Danny Glover; Ron Perlman; Linda Hamilton; Zoe Weizenbaum; David Strathairn
- Cinematography: Ken Kelsch
- Edited by: Peter V. White
- Music by: Sheldon Mirowitz
- Production companies: Angel Devil Productions; Intrinsic Value Films
- Distributed by: First Look International
- Release dates: May 28, 2005 (SIFF); January 10, 2006 (United States)
- Running time: 102 minutes
- Country: United States
- Language: English

Missing in America is a 2005 American drama film directed and co-produced by Gabrielle Savage Dockterman (in her feature directorial debut), who co-wrote the screenplay with Ken Miller and Nancy L. Babine from a story by Miller. It stars Danny Glover, Ron Perlman, Linda Hamilton, Zoe Weizenbaum, and David Strathairn. It follows an emotionally damaged Vietnam veteran who takes in the young half-Vietnamese daughter of his dying army buddy.

== Plot ==
Jake Neeley, a reclusive Vietnam War veteran, has lived alone in a cabin in the woods of the Pacific Northwest for 35 years, plagued by guilt over the loss of men under his command. His only interaction with other people occurs when he drives into town to sell firewood and buy supplies from Kate, a widowed storekeeper. His life changes when he is visited by Henry R. Hocknell, a former platoon member. Henry is dying of lung cancer caused by exposure to Agent Orange and entrusts the care of his half-Vietnamese daughter, Lenny, to Jake.

Jake refuses, but Henry vanishes overnight, leaving Lenny behind and giving Jake little choice but to look after her. Lenny proves troublesome and disrupts Jake's way of life. Over time, however, she encourages Jake to reach out to other veterans living nearby in self-imposed isolation.

== Production ==
The screenplay, written by Ken Miller, Gabrielle Savage Dockterman, and Nancy L. Babine, was based on an original story by Miller, inspired by his experience as a Green Beret and helicopter gunship pilot in Vietnam. The film's original title was The Woodcutter.

Missing in America reunites Danny Glover and David Strathairn after the 1984 film Iceman. It was produced by Dockterman, Isen Robbins, and Aimee Schoof. Principal photography took place for over six weeks at the end of 2003 in Vancouver, British Columbia and Washington, D.C.

== Cast ==
- Danny Glover as Jake Neeley
- Ron Perlman as Red
- Linda Hamilton as Kate
- Zoe Weizenbaum as Lenny Hocknell
- David Strathairn as Henry R. Hocknell Jr.
- Timothy Webber as Mitchell
- Gabrielle Rose as Cyd
- Frank C. Turner as Dinky
- Jesse Moss as Robert W. Gardner
- Ty Olsson as Soldier
- Colin Lawrence as Young Jake

== Release ==
The film had its world premiere at the Seattle International Film Festival on May 28, 2005. It was released on DVD and VHS on January 10, 2006.

== Reception ==
Ken Eisner of Variety wrote that "Glover's finely etched performance is the main thing recommending Missing in America, an after school-special type feature that won't wake up to find itself in Stateside malls," and criticized the screenplay for being "full of naive platitudes and obvious devices."

Nevertheless, the film was awarded Best Film, Best Director (for Dockterman), Best Actor (for Glover), and Best Actress (for Weizenbaum) at the Monaco International Film Festival. Dockterman also won the Audience Award for Emerging Director at both the St. Louis International Film Festival and the Woods Hole Film Festival in 2005.
