= 12 and Holding =

2005 film by Michael Cuesta

- Theatrical release poster
- Directed by: Michael Cuesta
- Written by: Anthony Cipriano
- Produced by: Brian Bell; Michael Cuesta; Jenny Schweitzer; Leslie Urdang; Amy Robinson
- Starring: Conor Donovan; Jesse Camacho; Zoe Weizenbaum; Jeremy Renner
- Cinematography: Romeo Tirone
- Edited by: Eric Carlson; Kane Platt
- Music by: Pierre Földes
- Distributed by: IFC Films
- Release dates: September 2005 (Toronto); May 19, 2006
- Running time: 95 minutes
- Country: United States
- Language: English
- Box office: $119,195

12 and Holding is a 2005 American coming-of-age drama film directed by Michael Cuesta and starring Conor Donovan, Jesse Camacho, Zoe Weizenbaum, and Jeremy Renner. The film is distributed by IFC Films and was released on May 19, 2006 in limited theaters.

== Plot ==
12-year-olds Rudy Carges and his overweight friend Leonard Fisher spend the night inside their treehouse after teenage bullies Jeff and Kenny threaten to destroy it. Jeff and Kenny arrive and set the treehouse on fire, not knowing Rudy and Leonard were in there until too late. Leonard escapes unharmed but then falls to the ground unconscious, while Rudy gets trapped and is burned to death offscreen.

Rudy's twin brother Jacob, an insecure boy with a huge birthmark, feels immense guilt for not being there to protect Rudy. At the hospital, Leonard recovers and finds out he lost his sense of taste and smell. Leonard is then prompted by his gym teacher to go on a diet, which isn't welcomed by his obese family. The boys' female friend Malee tries to befriend an adult named Gus, a grief-stricken patient of her therapist mother Carla. Jacob's family falls apart after the death of his brother, but soon after they adopt a boy named Keith Gardner. Meanwhile, Malee begins to have a crush on Gus and changes the song for her recital to one Gus likes. As time goes by, she sees Gus as her "soul mate". She sneaks into his house one night to find him grieving. Afraid to confront him, Malee steals his gun and leaves. She gives the gun to Jacob the following day.

Jacob's mother gets furious when she finds out Jeff and Kenny are being put in juvenile hall for only one year, while Jacob's father views Rudy's death as an accident. Jacob spends the next few months visiting Jeff and Kenny, and threatens them, until eventually Jeff commits suicide. Jacob sees Kenny grieving, so Jacob forgives and befriends Kenny; soon learning Kenny has an early release and is illegally moving to New Mexico. Meanwhile, Leonard's father decides to take Leonard's sisters to Florida for an annual trip instead of Leonard (who would usually go). Leonard decides to force his mother to lose weight by trapping her in the cellar. They both end up in the hospital after a gas leak in their home. Next, Jacob and Kenny agree that Jacob can go with him to New Mexico. Malee visits Gus and removes her clothes in an attempt to seduce him. Instead, Gus calls Malee's mother to come and pick her up. The next day, Gus explains to therapist Carla about the last fire he ever fought (which involved killing an injured little girl, upon the girl's request), claiming that Malee wanted him to take her pain away, as he was aware of her growing crush on him.

Meanwhile, Jacob's mother tells him that Keith Gardner wasn't adopted to replace Rudy, and that she wants Kenny dead, which reminds Jacob of his planned revenge. The night of escape for Jacob finally comes and he meets up with Kenny. Jacob insists on going through a construction site which he says is a secret route. Once there, Jacob points Gus's gun at Kenny and tells him "you killed him", then shoots him dead. After burying the body, Jacob leaves. He returns in the daytime, and sees Gus spreading cement above Kenny's grave, knowing the evidence is gone.

Malee begins visiting her estranged father, and Leonard's family finally starts eating healthily. Jacob returns home without telling anyone what he did.

== Cast ==
- Connor Donovan as Jacob Carges/Rudy Carges
- Jesse Camacho as Leonard Fisher
- Zoe Weizenbaum as Malee Chuang
- Jeremy Renner as Gus Maitland
- Annabella Sciorra as Carla Chuang
- Linus Roache as Jim Carges
- Adam LeFevre as Gabe Artunion
- Jayne Atkinson as Ashley Carges
- Marcia DeBonis as Grace Fisher
- Tom McGowan as Patrick Fisher
- Michael C. Fuchs as Kenny
- Martin Campetta as Jeff

== Reception ==
12 and Holding received generally positive reviews from critics. On the review aggregator website Rotten Tomatoes, the film has a 73% approval rating, based on 78 reviews, with an average rating of 6.7/10. The website's consensus reads, "This shocking pre-teen drama manages, through realistic performances and a sense of empathy, to avoid exploitation and instead deliver something honest and haunting."

Writing for About.com, critic Marcy Dermansky said, "Writers are often encouraged to provide moments of [epiphany] and revelation for their characters; 12 and Holding provides three transformations, and each is not only convincing, but also moving".

In a review for Slant Magazine, Keith Uhlich criticized "Anthony S. Cipriano’s contrivance-heavy screenplay and Michael Cuesta’s Six Feet Under-tutelaged direction", saying the film "comes off as something of a neo-con paranoid fantasy, its wayward trio of suburban youth standing in for the ills of America".
