= A Mother's Prayer =

- Video release
- Genre: Drama
- Written by: Lee Rose
- Directed by: Larry Elikann
- Starring: Linda Hamilton; Kate Nelligan; S. Epatha Merkerson; Bruce Dern; RuPaul; Alex Kapp Horner; Noah Fleiss; Jenny O'Hara
- Theme music composer: Tom Scott
- Country of origin: United States
- Original language: English

Production
- Executive producer: Lee Rose
- Producer: Sally Young
- Cinematography: Eric Van Haren Noman
- Editor: Peter V. White
- Running time: 94 minutes
- Production company: MCA Television Entertainment

Original release
- Network: USA Network
- Release: August 2, 1995

A Mother's Prayer is a 1995 film made for the USA Network starring Linda Hamilton, in a Golden Globe-nominated performance, as a woman who learns she has contracted the AIDS virus and must make plans for the care of her only son. The film, which counts Kate Nelligan, S. Epatha Merkerson and Bruce Dern in its supporting cast, premiered on August 2, 1995. It was eventually expanded, given a PG-13 rating and released on VHS via MCA/Universal Home Entertainment in 1996.

== Cast ==
- Linda Hamilton ... Rosemary Holmstrom
- Kate Nelligan ... Sheila Walker
- Noah Fleiss ... T.J. Holmstrom
- Bruce Dern ... John Walker
- RuPaul ... Deacon "Dede"
- S. Epatha Merkerson ... Ruby
- Alex Kapp Horner ... Martha
- Corey Parker ... Spence Walker
- Jenny O'Hara ... Val
- Gail Strickland ... Ruth
- McNally Sagal ... Dr. Kahn
- Aaron Lustig ... Dr. Shapiro
- Julie Garfield ... JoAnne Wasserman

== Awards and recognition ==
- CableACE Awards—Won

Linda Hamilton Actress in a Movie or Miniseries 1995

- Golden Globe Awards, The Hollywood Foreign Press—Nominated

Linda Hamilton Best Performance by an Actress in a Mini-Series or Motion Picture Made for TV 1996

- Humanitas Prize

Lee Rose 1996

- Young Artist Awards—Nominated

Noah Fleiss Best Performance by a Young Actor - TV Special 1996
