= Silent Fall =

- Theatrical release poster
- Directed by: Bruce Beresford
- Written by: Akiva Goldsman
- Produced by: James G. Robinson
- Starring: Richard Dreyfuss; Linda Hamilton; John Lithgow; J. T. Walsh; Liv Tyler
- Cinematography: Peter James
- Edited by: Ian Crafford
- Music by: Stewart Copeland
- Production company: Morgan Creek Productions
- Distributed by: Warner Bros.
- Release date: October 28, 1994
- Running time: 101 minutes
- Country: United States
- Language: English
- Budget: $30 million
- Box office: $3.2 million

Silent Fall is a 1994 American psychological thriller film directed by Bruce Beresford and starring Richard Dreyfuss, Linda Hamilton, John Lithgow, J. T. Walsh, and Liv Tyler in her debut role. The plot focuses on a boy with autism who is the only witness to the savage double murder of his parents.

Silent Fall was released by Warner Bros. on October 28, 1994. The film received negative reviews from critics and was a box office bomb, grossing $3.2 million against a $30 million budget.

== Plot ==
Tim Warden, an autistic boy, has supposedly witnessed his parents' ruthless murder. Jake Rainer, a former child psychiatrist turned therapist, is called on to probe the child's mind in order to solve the case.

The psychological drama is provided by the fact that not even Jake can entice Tim to communicate what he has or has not seen regarding the crime. Tim's sister, Sylvie, is protective of him. She eventually warms to Jake's efforts, but is concerned when she learns he was implicated in the suicide of another young child who was under his care.

Jake gradually befriends Tim. At first, Jake thinks that Tim is trying to communicate by cutting up playing cards, but Sylvie reveals that Tim is good at mimicking voices. Jake is able to trigger Tim's memory so that Tim mimics the voices he heard on the night of the murder by using the trigger phrase "God Damn", which were the first words Tim heard from the murder. He attempts to piece together the chronology of the murder, suspecting that Tim interrupted a fight between his parents and an intruder.

Sheriff Mitch Rivers threatens to use drugs to get Tim to talk about the murder and Dr. Rene Harlinger successfully hypnotizes Tim into breaking down a locked door. The police chief, seeing this as proof of Tim's strength, concludes that Tim was the murderer, after finding photographs showing that Tim's father was molesting him.

That night, Sylvie plans to take Tim away and attempts to convince Jake to run away with them. She fails, and in a panic instead paralyzes Jake and throws him into an icy lake to drown him. Tim mimics the police chief's voice through the phone to lure Sylvie to the police station and pulls Jake out of the lake while she is away.

Sylvie returns and Jake reveals that he has solved the mystery by examining Tim's cut up playing cards. It was actually Sylvie who killed her parents because her father had raped her repeatedly and was trying to do the same to Tim, and her mother was aware of the abuse and stayed silent the entire time. Sylvie tearfully tries to kill Jake again to stop other people from learning about her secret, but is persuaded not to do so by Tim who speaks with his own voice for the first time.

Jake, his wife Karen, and Tim go out for trick-or-treating on Halloween. Tim has gradually improved and now can speak in his own voice as well as smile. Jake's conversation with his wife reveals that Sylvie will be moved to a mental hospital with minimum security in the near future.

== Cast ==
- Richard Dreyfuss as Dr. Jake Rainer
- Linda Hamilton as Karen Rainer
- John Lithgow as Dr. Rene Harlinger
- Liv Tyler as Sylvie Warden
- J. T. Walsh as Sheriff Mitch Rivers
- Ben Faulkner as Tim Warden
- Zahn McClarnon as Deputy Bear
- Ron Tucker as Forensic Detective
- Catherine Shaffner as Martha
- Jane Beard as Carol Simmons

== Production ==
Akiva Goldsman wrote the screenplay under the title of Indian Summer which was acquired by Morgan Creek Entertainment for $500,000 in February 1991. In August 1993, it was announced Richard Dreyfuss had signed on to star in the film. In September 1993, it was reported that Dreyfuss had missed the first day of filming as he was invited by the White House to attend the signing of the Oslo I Accord.

To prepare for his role, Ben Faulkner visited and observed autistic children at the Linwood Center in Ellicott City, Maryland. Faulkner said he was unaware of what autism was prior to the making of the film.

A majority of the film was shot in and around Baltimore.

== Release ==
=== Box office ===
Produced on a budget of $30 million, the film grossed $3,180,674 in the United States and Canada. It opened on 1,251 screens with an opening weekend gross of $1.5 million and finishing in tenth place at the US box office but by its third weekend it was only on 256 screens and its gross had reduced by 90% to finish 40th. It dropped a further 93% by its fourth weekend, finishing 74th.

=== Critical response ===
Silent Fall received largely negative reviews from critics. On the review aggregator website Rotten Tomatoes, 31% of 16 critics' reviews are positive, with an average rating of 4.8/10.

Peter Rainer of the Los Angeles Times deemed it "a so-so thriller with a first-rate atmosphere. Director Bruce Beresford is working from a by-the-book script by Akiva Goldsman that piles up the preposterousness. As a murder mystery it’s schematic and too easy to figure out." Critic Roger Ebert gave the film 1.5 stars out of 4, similarly criticizing the film for its "torturously constructed plot... the solution to the mystery has been right there all along."

Caryn James of The New York Times criticized the screenplay and dialogue, noting that the actors "do the best they can", adding that the film "takes a lurid turn that includes enough fodder for several tabloid television shows and a few Stephen King novels. Using autism as a plot device may seem callous, but it pales next to the sordid twists that turn up at the end."

==== Year-end lists ====
- Dishonorable mention – Glenn Lovell, San Jose Mercury News

==== Awards and nominations ====
- 45th Berlin International Film Festival – nominated for the Golden Bear award.

== See also ==
- List of fictional characters on the autistic spectrum
- Mercury Rising
