= Separate Lives (film) =

1995 film by David Madden

- Theatrical release poster
- Directed by: David Madden
- Written by: Steven Pressfield
- Produced by: Mark Amin; Diane Nabatoff; Guy Riedel
- Starring: James Belushi; Linda Hamilton; Vera Miles; Elisabeth Moss
- Cinematography: Kees Van Oostrum
- Edited by: Janice Hampton
- Music by: William Olvis
- Production companies: Trimark Pictures; Interscope Communications
- Distributed by: Trimark Pictures
- Release date: September 8, 1995
- Running time: 102 minutes
- Country: United States
- Language: English

Separate Lives is a 1995 American psychological thriller film directed by David Madden and starring James Belushi, Linda Hamilton, Vera Miles and Elisabeth Moss.

== Plot ==
Dr. Lauren Porter's friend was killed a few years ago. Tom Beckwith, an ex-cop who gave up the profession after his wife died, follows Lauren's classes in order to become a psychiatrist. He learns that Lauren has a personality disorder after she convinces him to follow her with a camera and film her.

On his first tailing, Tom is beaten by a nightclub's owner who also turns out to be the boyfriend of Lauren's alter ego, Lena. Tom quits, but Lauren persuades him to reconsider. They confide in each other about their respective families. Tom is having a hard time raising his tomboyish daughter Ronni alone while Lauren confides she was the only witness for her mother and stepfather's murders. Her real father Robert, meanwhile, has moved on and is now a happy husband and father again.

Tom tries to connect with his ex-colleagues in investigating the murders. He learns that Lauren has an ex-husband, Charles, with whom she stayed on good terms. However, Charles is soon killed.

Tom decides to invite Lauren home for a dinner, where she makes Ronni understand that despite any personal problems, Tom is still her father and cares about her.

Believing the solution can be found at Lauren's childhood house, Tom drives her there. They discover that Robert is the real culprit. He manipulated his daughter, the only witness, by saying that she was as responsible as he was. Tom is shot in the arm, and Lauren tries to get her father to not kill his own daughter, but Robert coldly refuses to let her go and prepares to kill Lauren, claiming he has always hated her and his family. Seeing Robert as the irredeemable monster he truly is, Tom gets back up and manages to disarm Robert, before throwing him out the window to his death.

Tom promises to keep in touch with Lauren, who is committed to an asylum. Before he departs, they kiss.

== Cast ==
- James Belushi as Tom Beckwith
- Linda Hamilton as Lauren Porter / Lena
- Vera Miles as Dr. Ruth Goldin
- Elisabeth Moss as Ronni Beckwith
- Drew Snyder as Robert Porter
- Mark Lindsay Chapman as Keno Sykes
- Marc Poppel as Detective Joe Gallo
- Elizabeth Arlen as Dee Harris
- Josh Taylor as Charles Duffy
- Ken Kerman as Detective Boyle
- Michael Whaley as Detective Miller
- Jackie Debatin as Darlene
- Joshua Malina as Randall
- Lisa Vanderpump as Heidi Porter
- Craig Stepp as David Mills
- Lisa Chess as Margaret Porter-Mills

== Reception ==
The film received mostly negative reviews from critics. It was criticized by the Los Angeles Times as a direct-to-video version of Never Talk to Strangers.
