= Shadow Conspiracy =

1997 American film

- Theatrical release poster
- Directed by: George P. Cosmatos
- Written by: Adi Hasak; Ric Gibbs
- Produced by: Andrew G. Vajna; Buzz Feitshans; Terry Collis
- Starring: Charlie Sheen; Donald Sutherland; Linda Hamilton; Stephen Lang; Ben Gazzara; Sam Waterston
- Cinematography: Buzz Feitshans IV
- Edited by: Robert A. Ferretti; Mike Murphy
- Music by: Bruce Broughton
- Production companies: Cinergi Pictures; Hollywood Pictures
- Distributed by: Buena Vista Pictures Distribution (North America/South America); Cinergi Productions (International, via Summit Entertainment)
- Release date: January 31, 1997
- Running time: 103 minutes
- Country: United States
- Language: English
- Budget: $45 million
- Box office: $2.3 million

Shadow Conspiracy is a 1997 American political thriller film starring Charlie Sheen, Donald Sutherland, Linda Hamilton, and Sam Waterston. It was the final film directed by George P. Cosmatos.

The film was poorly received by critics. It was released on DVD in the United States in November 2003 by Buena Vista Home Entertainment.

== Plot ==
Set in Washington, D.C., this film documents an attempted power grab by White House Chief of Staff Jacob Conrad. Bobby Bishop is a special aide to the President of the United States who finds out about a plot to assassinate the President from a former professor. Bobby's old professor is murdered shortly thereafter and Bobby is left to try to uncover the conspiracy on his own. He recruits his journalist friend Amanda Givens to help him uncover the mystery and stop the assassination.

== Cast ==
- Charlie Sheen as Bobby Bishop
- Donald Sutherland as Jacob Conrad
- Linda Hamilton as Amanda Givens
- Stephen Lang as The Agent
- Ben Gazzara as Vice President Saxon
- Nicholas Turturro as Grasso
- Sam Waterston as President of the United States
- Gore Vidal as Congressman Page
- Stanley Anderson as Attorney General Toyanbee
- Theodore Bikel as Professor Yuri Pochenko
- Charles Cioffi as General Blackburn
- Paul Gleason as Blythe
- Terry O'Quinn as Frank Ridell
- Dey Young as Janet

== Production ==
Production began in June 1995. The script was purchased for $600,000 against $1 million. Shadow Conspiracy was filmed in 12 weeks, with most of the principal photography taking place in Richmond, Virginia, Georgetown, Washington, D.C. and Baltimore, Maryland.

== Reception ==
Shadow Conspiracy was panned by critics. On Rotten Tomatoes, the film has a rating of 7% based on reviews from 29 critics. The site's critics' consensus reads: "Rather than exciting audiences with a thrilling race against time, Shadow Conspiracy suggests there may be a secret cabal duping talented actors into selecting woefully deficient scripts." The film did not fare well at the box office, grossing a little over $2 million domestically.

== See also ==
- The Awakening (buried-giant sculpture featured in the film)
