= Sex & Mrs. X =

- Written by: Elisa Bell; Amanda Vaill (article)
- Directed by: Arthur Allan Seidelman
- Starring: Jacqueline Bisset; Linda Hamilton; Paolo Seganti; Peter MacNeill
- Theme music composer: Joseph Conlan
- Country of origin: United States
- Original language: English

Production
- Cinematography: Don E. FauntLeRoy
- Editor: Sharyn L. Ross
- Running time: 100 min
- Production companies: Hearst Entertainment; Lifetime

Original release
- Network: Lifetime
- Release: April 10, 2000

Sex & Mrs. X is a 2000 Lifetime television film. It was directed by Arthur Allan Seidelman and based on an article published by Amanda Vaill in Allure. It stars Jacqueline Bisset and Linda Hamilton and premiered on April 10, 2000.

== Plot ==
Joanna (Hamilton) is a magazine writer whose life is thrown into disarray when her husband leaves her for another woman. But she finds salvation when she is assigned to interview a Paris madame (Bisset) who inspires a sexual reawakening in her.

== Cast ==
- Jacqueline Bisset as Madame Simone
- Linda Hamilton as Joanna Scott
- Paolo Seganti as Francesco
- Peter MacNeill as Harry Frost
- Sarah Lafleur as Maid
- Stewart Bick as Dale Scott
- Tracey E. Bregman as Katherine
- Marina Anderson as Shirley
- Jonathan Potts as Rick Stockwell

== Announced Remake ==
Deadline announced that Lionsgate, which owns the IP to this film via their ownership of the Hearst Entertainment library, was working with MarVista Entertainment in re-imagining this film and over 100 others in the Hearst library. Some other confirmed films include The Babysitter's Seduction, Sex, Lies & Obsession, Blue Valley Songbird, A Different Kind of Christmas, and Santa Who?. Both companies, which are jointly distributing these films, told the publication that they are targeting a streaming-savvy audience with these films and plan to release them to a streaming service, which hasn't been determined yet.
