= Mary Elizabeth Bartowski =

Character from Chuck

- Chuck character
- Linda Hamilton as Mary Elizabeth Bartowski
- First appearance: "Chuck Versus the Ring: Part II"
- Last appearance: "Chuck Versus the Goodbye"
- Portrayed by: Linda Hamilton

In-universe information
- Alias: Frost (codename)
- Gender: Female
- Occupation: Undercover CIA Agent
- Family: Jesse Gunter (father); Mary Gunter (mother); Sarah Bartowski (daughter-in-law); Dr. Devon Woodcomb (son-in-law); Clara Woodcomb (granddaughter)
- Spouse: Stephen J. Bartowski (deceased)
- Children: Dr. Eleanor Fay "Ellie" Woodcomb (daughter); Charles Irving Bartowski (son)
- Born: Mary Elizabeth Gunter; December (unknown year)

Mary Elizabeth Bartowski (née Gunter) is a character on the television series Chuck, the estranged mother of Chuck and Ellie Bartowski, portrayed by Linda Hamilton.

== Biography ==
Few details about Mary's life have been revealed on the show. She was a CIA agent, while her husband worked with the CIA on the Intersect project. In 1991, her son Chuck breaks her favorite necklace, which is a charm of a boy and a girl holding hands. Although Ellie was greatly angered about this, Stephen tells her to help Chuck fix it. In "Chuck Versus the Ring: Part II" Chuck reveals that Mary left shortly after the incident (1994, according to "Chuck Versus the Anniversary"), and for some period of time Chuck blamed himself for her departure. Otherwise, all that is known prior to Season 4 is that Mary left her family under unknown circumstances when Chuck was in the fifth grade.

"Chuck Versus the Anniversary" revealed that Mary used to read Chuck a bedtime story called "The Frost Queen," the title character of which was the basis of Mary's codename: "Frost." Although the circumstances are not yet clear, Mary never actually left her family but instead had been captured, at some point ending up in the custody of Volkoff Industries. In "Chuck Versus the Aisle of Terror" Mary reveals that she left to go into deep cover with Volkoff, but got in too deep and placed her family at risk. The CIA operation was code-named Isis; however, intelligence recovered by John Casey from a former NSA contact indicated that Isis was canceled some 20 years earlier after Mary went rogue.

== Series ==
In the first two seasons, Mary was entirely unseen, though her departure was occasionally mentioned. Chuck tells Sarah that the day their mother left is the day he and Ellie learned to look after each other because their father was "never really there," a date they celebrate as "Mother's Day." Chuck would later give Sarah a charm bracelet that belonged to Mary as a Christmas gift during a hostage crisis at the Buy More. Stephen had previously given the bracelet to Mary when she was pregnant with Ellie and Sarah reluctantly accepted it, despite it being something Chuck should give to a "real girlfriend."

Mary first appeared on-screen in "Chuck Versus the Ring: Part II". After his death, Stephen leaves Chuck a video message, introducing Chuck to his 20 year secret spy life and lair. In the message, he states that he "did it all for her," i.e. Mary. In the lair, is a box labeled "MARY ELIZABETH BARTOWSKI: MISSING." In Mary's file it is revealed that her parents are Jesse and Mary Gunter, and she was born in December. As Chuck walks through the lair, he finds a table on which sits the "boy" half of the broken necklace. The scene then shifts to a woman at a desk who receives a phone call, telling her she needs to move immediately. When the camera angle changes, it is revealed that the woman is wearing the "girl" half of Mary's necklace as a bracelet.

Linda Hamilton first appeared in the role in "Chuck Versus the Anniversary". Mary monitored Chuck's discovery of a safe house in LA, where a menu for a Chinese takeout restaurant provided him and Morgan with clues implicating Volkoff Industries in her disappearance. Chuck tracked Mary to Volkoff's Moscow headquarters, but he sacrificed information on her whereabouts to save Sarah and Casey from Volkoff's men. After the team's escape from Volkoff's headquarters, Mary herself escaped custody after killing several of her captors.

Mary resurfaces in "Chuck Versus the Aisle of Terror", after having contacted Chuck in the previous episode. Following a tense confrontation with Sarah which Chuck defuses and where Mary claims to be operating under "deep cover" for a CIA project codenamed "Isis," Mary offers up Dr. Wheelwright (Robert Englund) and a nightmare-inducing toxin he is producing for Volkoff as it is "too dangerous" to be allowed into the wrong hands. However after a series of double and triple-crosses in which she ultimately aids the team in capturing Wheelwright, Mary's ultimate allegiances remain unknown, and she is apprehended by Sarah and Casey without Chuck's involvement or prior knowledge. The ambiguity persists into "Chuck Versus the First Fight". After her arrest Mary convinces Chuck to seek out her MI6 handler, Tuttle (Timothy Dalton), who can provide intelligence clearing her name. When Chuck is captured, she agrees to help Sarah and Casey locate him after a deal brokered by Morgan to see Ellie. During the meeting she provides carefully worded hints that help Ellie locate a hidden message Stephen left for her in the event of his death. After Chuck, Sarah and Tuttle recovered the MI6 data clearing her, she accompanied Chuck and Sarah back to their old home and Stephen's hidden base, where she apparently betrayed them again. Mary flashed Chuck with a device that apparently neutralized the Intersect, allowing her to capture the pair alongside Tuttle, now revealed as Alexei Volkoff. However as Volkoff set charges to destroy Stephen's base and intelligence, Mary surreptitiously slipped Sarah a razor to allow them to escape, and asked her to protect her son.

In "Chuck Versus the Leftovers", Volkoff finds out Chuck survived the explosion and sends Mary to make sure his assassins finish off Chuck. Instead she takes out the assassins and takes Chuck back to Castle. Volkoff storms the Buy More trapping team Bartowski to rescue Mary because he is in love with her. Chuck is furious but she swears that they were never together. Mary admits Chuck is her son to save his life and Volkoff decides he should join them for Leftovers dinner to meet her family. When Volkoff feels Chuck has betrayed him by sending Ellie and Devon away, Mary saves him again by telling Volkoff she can not love someone who would hurt her family. She leaves with Volkoff telling Chuck she hopes he can trust her one day. He says he does.

In "Chuck Versus the Gobbler", Sarah goes under cover as a double agent working for Volkoff essentially becoming Mary's partner. Her plan is to have Sarah free Yuri "the Gobbler" from prison to gain access to Hydra, Volkoff's network. When Volkoff destroys the copy hidden in Yuri's false eye and downloads it to another location, Mary retrieves a piece of the micro chip.

In "Chuck Versus the Push Mix", Volkoff discovers Mary's betrayal. She tells him that her husband is ten times the man he is and she never stopped thinking of him. A united Team Bartowski retrieves Hydra, arrests Volkoff and frees Mary to be with Ellie when she gives birth to Clara. Mary becomes a nearly ideal grandmother telling Ellie she wants to give Clara everything she didn't give her children. Though she loves having her mother, Ellie admits that she can't keep Mary from being a hero as she did to Chuck.

Having come in from the cold of deep cover, Mary has access to Castle and the files on Volkoff Industries. Her relationship with Brigadier General Beckman is implied in "Chuck Versus the Family Volkoff" to have been long and generally positive; she is one of only a handful of recurring characters (and no regulars) whom Beckman is comfortable with addressing her by her forename, Diane. Mary and Casey take up arms against their government colleagues in Castle in "Chuck Versus the Cliffhanger". With Sarah's life in the balance, Mary sends Chuck out an emergency exit with prisoner Hartley Winterbottom (revealed to be Volkoff's true identity) and false passports, never expecting to see her son again. With Chuck safe, Mary and Casey manage to escape as well. The pair - joined by Morgan, the two remaining CAT Squad members whom he called, and Chuck - engage in another armed stand-off with their CIA colleagues who intend to stop Chuck from delivering an antidote to Sarah. Mary, like the others, is spared from execution or criminal prosecution by Chuck's blackmail threat to reveal to the media the actions taken by their adversary, Clyde Decker; it is not known whether her employment was terminated along with that of Chuck, Sarah and Casey.

Mary reappears in the Series finale "Chuck Versus the Goodbye" where she gives Chuck information on how to stop Nicolas Quinn from reassembling the Key, a device which can modify the Intersect.

== Development ==
Speculation on who would be portraying Mary began immediately after her appearance in the third season finale, and Hamilton's casting was announced during the Chuck panel at Comic-Con 2010.

=== Personality ===
Josh Schwartz has revealed that when Mary appears in the season four premiere, "Chuck Versus the Anniversary", she will have an "intensity" of which Hamilton is "a natural fit." Not only will she bring a fanboy-friendly resume to the show, but she will be "kicking ass right out of the gate."

Very little has been definitively established about Mary's personality and loyalties in the series itself. She ruthlessly killed several of Volkoff's henchmen in "Chuck Versus the Anniversary" after being told by Marco that her family is looking for her, and in "Chuck Versus the Cubic Z" she is referred to as "Frosty the Snow Bitch" by Heather Chandler. In "Chuck Versus the Coup d'Etat" Premier Goya of Costra Gravas described her as a "kept woman" of Volkoff, and MacKintosh described her in "Chuck Versus the Couch Lock" as Volkoff's "right hand," the woman who Volkoff sends to make his problems disappear.

When Mary contacts Chuck in "Chuck Versus the Aisle of Terror" she expresses little emotional interest in Chuck's life, claiming she only broke cover to assist them in capturing Wheelwright and his toxins. Acting as a thorough professional, she shot Chuck (knowing he was wearing a vest) to preserve her cover and later kidnapped him at gunpoint in order to take him to where she stashed the mad scientist for capture. However she also admits that Chuck and Ellie were all she has thought about, and claims to have "killed" Charles Carmichael to keep Chuck and Ellie off Volkoff's radar. Nonetheless, she largely remains cold and professional to Chuck, although learning that Ellie was pregnant did have a visible emotional effect on her sufficient to convince her to see her daughter one last time before disappearing again. In "Chuck Versus the First Fight" Volkoff describes Mary as a "master of deception" after she betrays Chuck and Sarah, and claims that Stephen spent his life looking for a woman who didn't want to be found. However as if to highlight this description Mary also enables Chuck and Sarah to escape behind Volkoff's back, and helped Ellie locate a car Stephen left for her containing some of his inventions, leaving her true allegiances unknown.

Mary has revealed that she is fully aware Chuck is the Intersect when she suggested Chuck report having flashed on Dr. Wheelwright to explain the intelligence she gave him.
