= Mekenna Melvin =

American actress

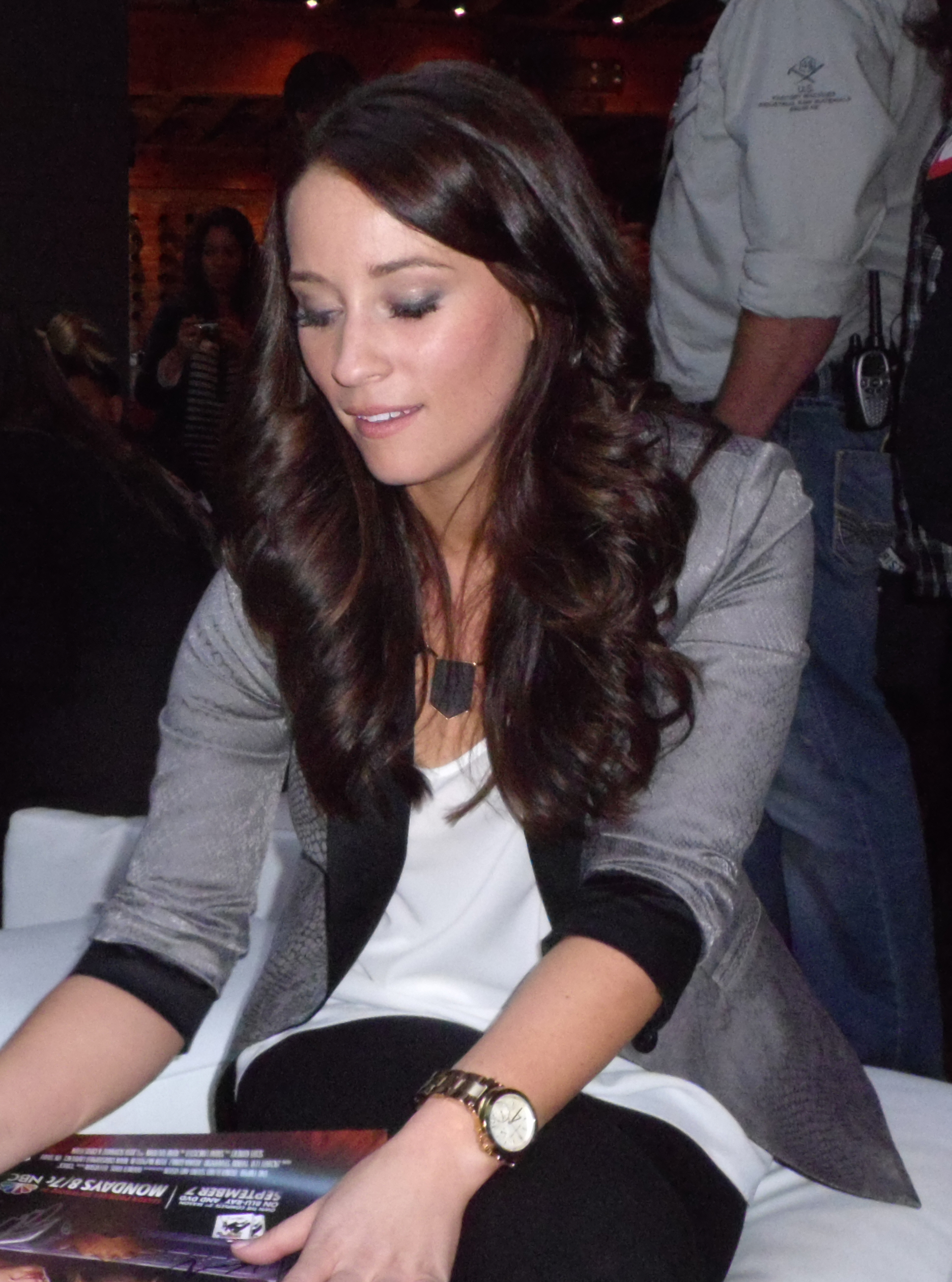
- Mekenna Melvin in 2010
- Born: Saratoga, California, U.S.
- Occupation: Actress
- Years active: 2008–present

Mekenna Melvin is an American actress best known for playing Alex McHugh in Chuck, Angela in Three Rivers and Stefanie Fife in Lie to Me. She also co-created and starred as Amber Hannold in Amber Lake, an independent film released in 2010.

== Personal life ==
Melvin was born and raised in Saratoga, California. She became interested in acting at a young age through spending time at a local theater with her mother, a theater director, and made her first acting appearance as Woodstock in a local performance of You're a Good Man, Charlie Brown at the age of 5. She is a graduate of Independence High School in San Jose, California.

She trained at both the American Academy of Dramatic Arts in New York City, New York and the British American Drama Academy in Oxford, England.

Melvin is professionally trained as an actress, dancer, and singer, and also has martial arts training, at the level of a first degree blackbelt, in taekwondo.

== Filmography ==
Film and television
| Year | Title | Role | Notes |
|---|---|---|---|
| 2008 | Dear Me | Brunette Bety | |
| 2008 | MeterMan | Vanessa | short film |
| 2008 | The Last Page | Lily | short film |
| 2009 | Lie to Me | Stefanie Fife | TV series, episode: "A Perfect Score" |
| 2009 | Three Rivers | Angela | TV series, episode: "Code Green" |
| 2010 | Melting the Snowman | Caroline Jamieson | short film |
| 2010 | The Fighting Kind | Madison | short film |
| 2010-2012 | Chuck | Alex McHugh | TV series, season 3, 4, 5 (24 episodes) |
| 2010 | Detroit 1-8-7 | Karla Lawford / Karla Lutz | TV series, season 1 (2 episodes) |
| 2010 | Amber Lake | Amber Hannold | |
| 2012 | Buds | Amber | short film |
| 2012 | Vegas | Holly Edwards | TV series, 1 episode |
| 2013 | The Nightmare Nanny | Amber | TV film |
| 2013 | Castle | Talia McTeague | TV series, episode: "Watershed" |
| 2013 | Grey's Anatomy | Katie | TV series, episode: "Somebody That I Used to Know" |
| 2014 | Mr. Intangibles | Angie | |
| 2015 | His Secret Family | Lauren | TV film |
| 2016 | Relationship Status | Rachel | TV series, 4 episodes |
| 2016 | Once Upon a Time | Clorinda Tremaine | TV series, episode: "The Other Shoe" |
| 2017 | Threadbare | Hannah | TV series, episode: "Three" |
| 2017 | A Woman Deceived | Monica | TV film |
| 2018 | The Bad Guys | Annie | |
