= Linda Hamilton =

American actress (born 1956)

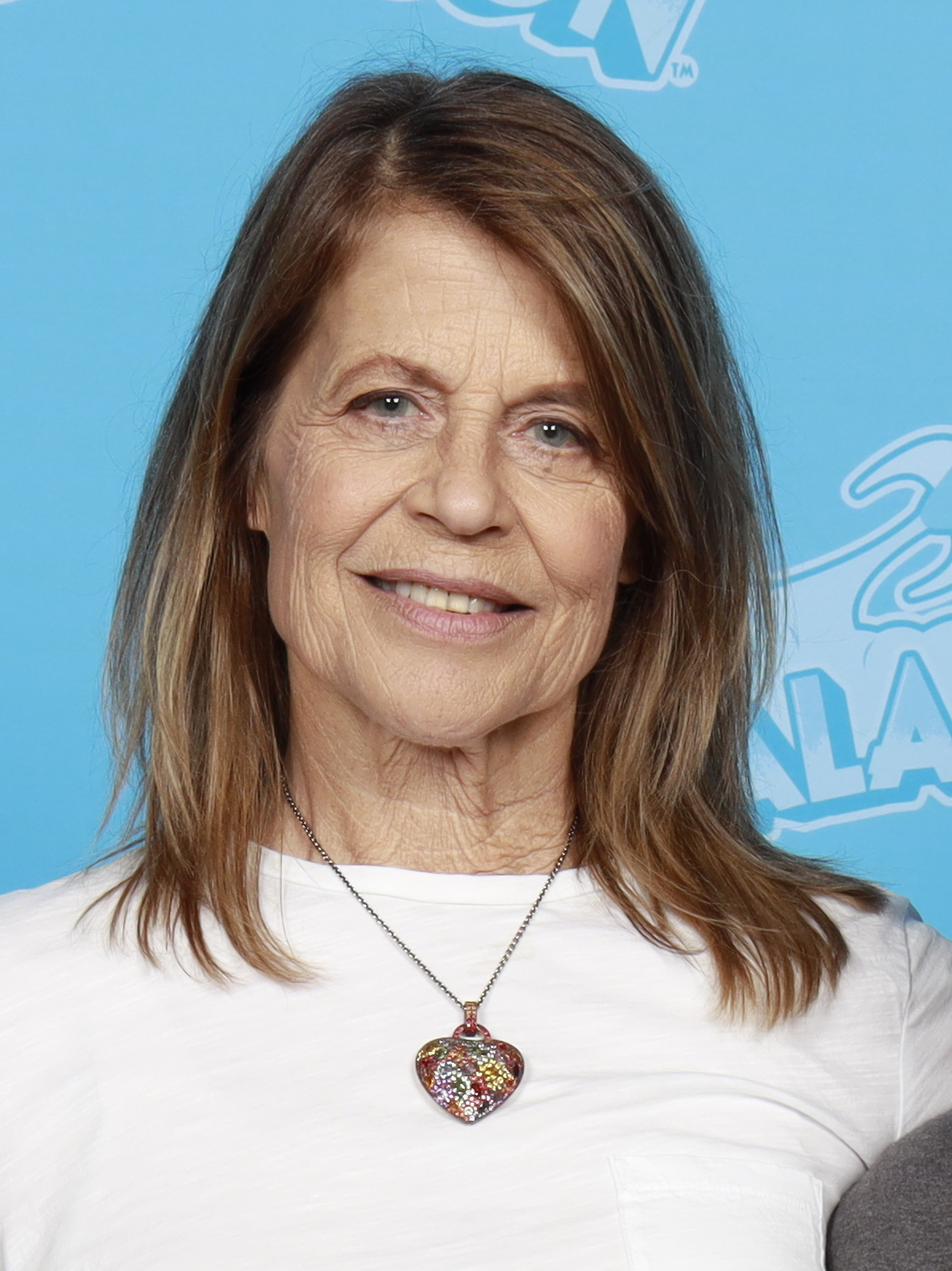
- Hamilton in 2024
- Born: September 26, 1956 (age 70); Salisbury, Maryland, U.S.
- Occupation: Actress
- Years active: 1978–present
- Works: Full list
- Spouses: Bruce Abbott (m. 1982; div. 1989) James Cameron (m. 1997; div. 1999)
- Children: 2

Linda Carroll Hamilton (born September 26, 1956) is an American actress. Known for portraying tough, resilient characters, she made her film debut in 1979 before achieving fame with her starring role as Sarah Connor in The Terminator (1984) and two of its sequels, Terminator 2: Judgment Day (1991) and Terminator: Dark Fate (2019). She is the recipient of various accolades, including two Saturn Awards, two MTV Movie Awards, a Satellite Award and a Romy Award, as well as nominations for three Golden Globes and one Primetime Emmy.

Hamilton's other film credits include Children of the Corn (1984), Black Moon Rising (1986), King Kong Lives (1986), Mr. Destiny (1990), Dante's Peak (1997), and The Kid & I (2005). Her television roles include Catherine Chandler in Beauty and the Beast (1987–1989), Mary Elizabeth Bartowski in Chuck (2010–2012), and Dr. Kay in the fifth and final season of Stranger Things (2025). She has also appeared in plays such as Laura (Tiffany Theater, 2000) and The Night of the Iguana (Berkshire Theatre, 2006). She is divorced from actor Bruce Abbott and filmmaker James Cameron, with one child from each marriage.

== Early life ==
Linda Carroll Hamilton was born in Salisbury, Maryland, on September 26, 1956. Hamilton's father (1928–1962) died when she was five; her mother (1931–2019) later married a police chief. Hamilton had an identical twin sister, Leslie Hamilton Freas (1956–2020), as well as one older sister, a younger brother, and a stepbrother. She has said that she was raised in a "very boring, white Anglo-Saxon" household, and that she "voraciously read books" in her spare time. Hamilton went to Wicomico Junior High and Wicomico High School in Salisbury.

She studied for two years at Washington College in Chestertown, Maryland, before moving on to acting studies in New York City. Hamilton has said that her acting professor at Washington College told her she had no hope of earning a living as an actress. In New York, she attended acting workshops given by Lee Strasberg.

== Career ==
=== 1979–1983: Film debut and early roles ===
Hamilton made her professional debut at age 23 with a small part in the 1979 drama Night-Flowers. Her first major role came the following year when she appeared as Lisa Rogers on the short-lived CBS soap opera Secrets of Midland Heights (December 1980–January 1981). She appeared in the TV series "King's Crossing," as Lauren Hollister, immediately afterward in 1982. Hamilton played in supporting roles to actress Marilyn Jones in both of those last two efforts, playing the bad girl in each instance. Hamilton subsequently appeared in her first starring film role in the low-budget thriller TAG: The Assassination Game (1982), and co-starred that same year in the made-for-television movie Country Gold. She was listed as one of twelve "Promising New Actors of 1982" in John A. Willis' Screen World, Vol. 34.

=== 1984–1997: The Terminator franchise and television work ===
Hamilton made two prominent film appearances in 1984: firstly, a starring role in Children of the Corn, a horror film based on the short story by Stephen King. Hamilton played Vicky Baxter, a motorist who runs into trouble while travelling with her boyfriend through rural Nebraska. The film was financially profitable, making US$14 million at the domestic box office against a budget of US$3 million, but received generally negative reviews. In a more positive assessment by The New York Times, Hamilton's performance was praised. Secondly, her next role was co-starring in James Cameron's science fiction action film The Terminator (1984) as Sarah Connor, a young waitress who finds herself at the center of a nightmarish ordeal. A soldier travels back in time to help her defeat the titular cyborg assassin, which was sent from the future to execute her because her son will become a valiant resistance leader. The film was made with modest expectations but became a surprise commercial hit, topping the U.S. box office for two weeks. Critics believed it to be a perfect example of its genre, with some attributing its strength to Hamilton's performance; The Hollywood Reporter wrote that she displayed "tremendous resiliency" as Connor, while Janet Maslin felt she played the part "engrossingly" in her review for The New York Times. That same year, she guest-starred in four episodes of the NBC police drama Hill Street Blues.

Following the success of The Terminator, Hamilton starred as car thief Nina in the action thriller Black Moon Rising (1986). Also that year, she guest-starred in an episode of Murder, She Wrote and headlined the big-budget adventure film King Kong Lives, a sequel to the 1976 remake of King Kong. The film was a moderate financial success but was universally panned by critics.

Hamilton's next major role was that of savvy district attorney Catherine Chandler in the television series Beauty and the Beast. A modern re-telling of the classic fairy tale, the show ran for three seasons on CBS between 1987 and 1990, though Hamilton requested to be written out during its third season when she fell pregnant. For her portrayal of Chandler, she won Austria's Romy Award for Favorite Actress in a Series in 1990, as well as receiving Golden Globe and Emmy Award nominations in 1988 and 1989, respectively.

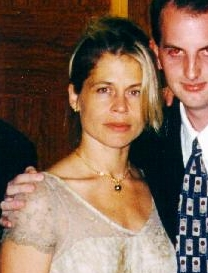
Hamilton in 1997

Hamilton returned to film with a starring role opposite James Belushi in the 1990 fantasy-comedy Mr. Destiny. In her review for the Los Angeles Times, Sheila Benson believed that the film only worked because of "Hamilton's intrinsic warmth". The following year, she re-teamed with James Cameron to star in Terminator 2: Judgment Day. Reported at the time to be the most expensive motion picture ever made, it went on to gross over US$500 million worldwide; more than any other film that year. Of his decision to present a more troubled version of the Sarah Connor character, Cameron later reflected, "It was all inspired by Linda really. I called her and said, 'Hey, we're [doing] another Terminator'. And she [replied], 'I want to be crazy'. I said, 'I can do that — I'll put you in a mental hospital'. She said, 'Perfect. That's what I want'". Hamilton underwent intense physical training to emphasize the character's transformation during the seven years since the first film. "I hated [my trainer] most of the time", she later said; "He would yell at me and throw tennis balls while I was shooting weapons blindfolded. I'd go off to the bathroom to cry for a minute, then I'd wipe away my tears and go back". Critics were impressed by Hamilton's "wild-eyed" performance, with Derek Malcolm of The Guardian singling out her "formidable sweaty intensity". She went on to receive two MTV Movie Awards and the 1991 Saturn Award for Best Actress for her portrayal of Connor, which has since been recognised as one of the most iconic female roles in cinematic history. Following the success of T2, she was invited to host an episode of Saturday Night Live on November 16, 1991.

Hamilton's subsequent film appearances were in the psychological thrillers Silent Fall (1994) and Separate Lives (1995). For her performance in the television movie A Mother's Prayer (1995), where she played a widow diagnosed with AIDS, Hamilton received a CableACE Award and a Golden Globe nomination for Best Actress. On her decision to take the part, she said, "So many people think I'm just this incredibly ferocious, fierce woman. Sarah Connor has sort of etched herself into my psyche and will never go away. So I chose [to play] this woman because she was a great balance of strength and frailty". She put herself on a strict diet in preparation for the role, saying, "I had to know what it was like ... I knew that I had to sort of sink in on myself. So I got very, very thin".

After guest-starring in an episode of Frasier, Hamilton played leading roles in two features that were released one week apart in 1997: political thriller Shadow Conspiracy and the big-budget action-adventure film Dante's Peak co-starring Pierce Brosnan. The latter proved to be one of the biggest commercial hits of the year, grossing US$180 million. Critics were mostly unimpressed by the film's derivative narrative, but some praised the effects and performances, with Roger Ebert of Chicago Sun-Times praising their restrained performances: "In Brosnan and Hamilton [the filmmakers] have actors who play for realism and don't go over the top". For her portrayal of small-town mayor Rachel Wando, Hamilton was named Best Actress at the following year's Blockbuster Entertainment Awards. Speaking of her casting, she said, "Police officers, military officers and lesbians. That was pretty much what I [used to get offered] and nothing else. [When I auditioned for director] Roger Donaldson, he literally said to me: 'You've never played a part like this before' ... And [I said], 'What do you mean?' [He replied] 'Normal.' He thought I couldn't play normal! Jesus! It was just the way people thought [about me]".

=== 1998–2018: Stage, television, and film roles ===
In 1998, she received a Satellite Award for Best Actress for her performance as a "down-to-earth" Anna Sipes, a white housewife befriending her new neighbour Minnie (Lynn Whitfield) in an all-white neighbourhood, in the historical TV drama The Color of Courage, which was based on the historical legal milestone "Sipes vs McGhee".

Between 1998 and 1999, Hamilton appeared in a succession of voice roles in episodes of The New Batman Adventures, Hercules, and Batman Beyond. Her next project was the Lifetime movie Sex & Mrs. X (2000), where she played a magazine writer who experiences a sexual reawakening when she is assigned to interview an upper-class Parisian madam. The Los Angeles Times called it an "[intriguing] character study that passes muster on the strength of good performances by [its leads]", adding that Hamilton was both "tough" and "tender" in the part.

She also headlined a production of Laura, an adaptation of the 1944 film noir of the same name, at California's Tiffany Theater in December 2000. Hamilton received praise for her portrayal of the title character, with Jay Reiner of The Hollywood Reporter commenting:

There's an inherent risk in reviving a film classic like Laura ... [original star] Gene Tierney ... left such an indelible impression that any [actress] trying to fill [her] shoes [is] probably going to suffer by comparison. Linda Hamilton accepts this risk, and even turns it to her advantage, in [this] sparkling production ... Where [Tierney] gave us Laura Hunt as a ravishing femme fatale shrouded in mystery, Hamilton gives us a genuine charmer — a woman intriguing enough to invite attention, elusive enough to ensure pursuit and smart enough to make it all seem worthwhile ... after a few minutes in her company, you don't want to be anywhere else.

The following year, Hamilton starred in the small-scale mystery thriller Skeletons in the Closet (2001), subsequently winning a DVD Exclusive Award for Best Supporting Actress. She then portrayed the real-life Ethel Rosenberg in Worse Than Murder: Ethel and Julius Rosenberg, admitting that her decision to "transform myself into a tenement Jew from the Lower East Side" had been a daunting one: "I'm already prepared for the critics to be unkind to me, like, 'Why is she playing a Jewish character' or 'What's she trying to do, prove she's an actress?' But the fear is just part of the process". The play opened in May 2002—at the Ventura Theatre in California—to a rave review from Variety, who felt that Hamilton played her part with "sumptuous veracity". Next, she had supporting roles in two films: the post-Vietnam war drama Missing in America (2005) and the Penelope Spheeris-directed comedy The Kid & I (2005).

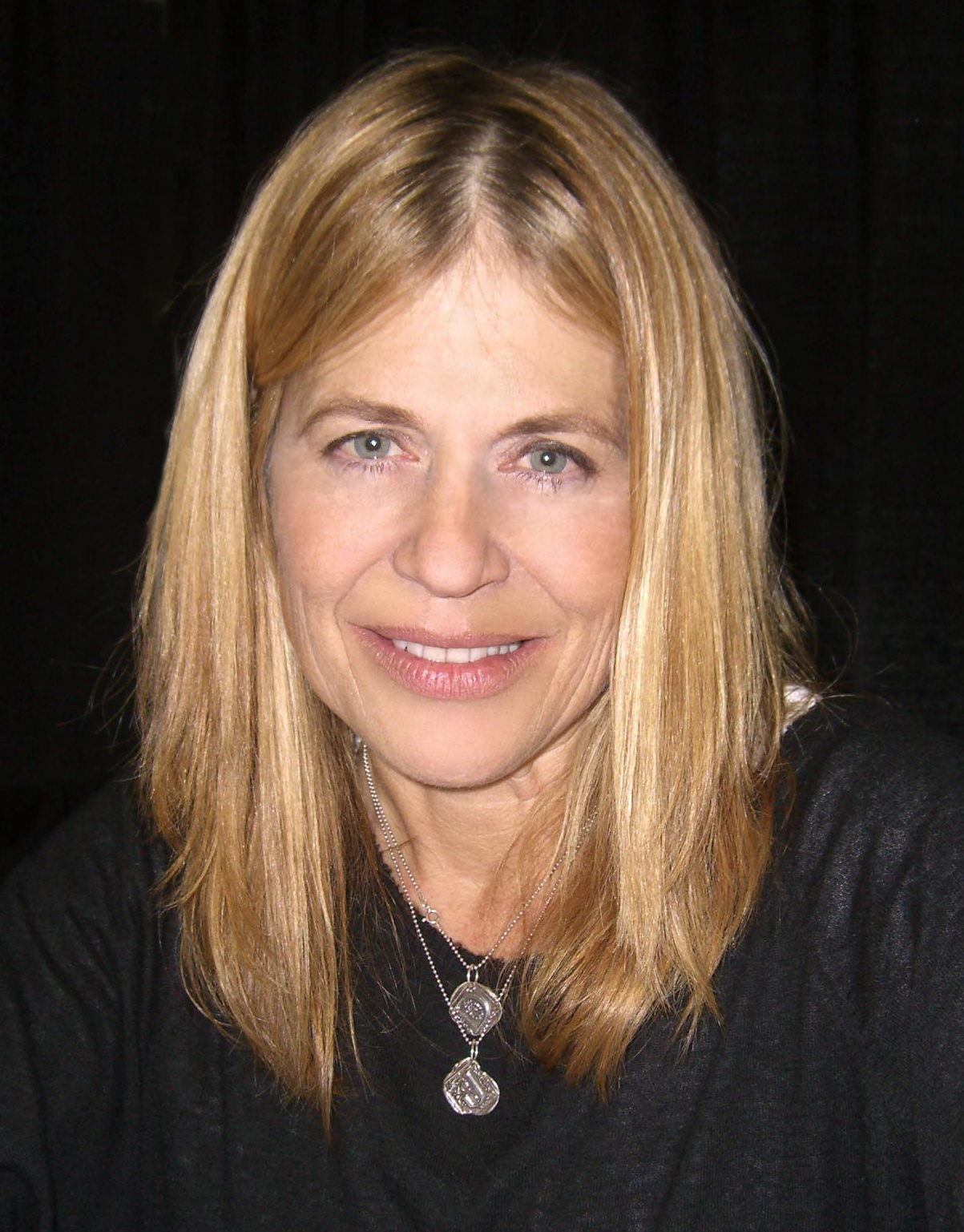
Hamilton at the Big Apple Convention, 2009

Hamilton's portrayal of Maxine Faulk in the 2006 stage adaptation of The Night of the Iguana by Tennessee Williams was met with acclaim. Writing for Variety, Frank Rizzo said, "[She is] well cast as the recently widowed but hardly mourning proprietress ... She takes over the stage with natural assurance and plays this overripe survivor with lusty humor and cunning". The production ran between August 1–12 at the Berkshire Theatre in Stockbridge, Massachusetts.

Hamilton reprised the role of Sarah Connor for a second time with a voice cameo in 2009's Terminator Salvation, which grossed US$371 million at the worldwide box office. In 2010, she joined the cast of NBC's espionage-style comedy series Chuck, playing the recurring role of CIA agent Mary Elizabeth Bartowski. That same year, she guest-starred in three episodes of the Showtime dark comedy Weeds—as the marijuana supplier for the series' protagonist—and appeared as a "cartoon American cop" in the poorly received Irish film Holy Water.

In 2011, Hamilton narrated the Chiller network's The Future of Fear, a documentary on the history of horror films. She then played a fictional U.S. president in the television miniseries Air Force One Is Down (2013), and had recurring roles as a bounty hunter on the Showcase series Lost Girl (2013) and a mentally ill mother on Syfy's Defiance (2014–2015). Her next projects were the television pilot Shoot Me Nicely (2016), which was later released as a short film, and the small-scale science fiction film Curvature (2017). In his evaluation of the latter for The Hollywood Reporter, Frank Scheck described it as "awfully loopy", adding, "it's always a pleasure to see Hamilton, even if it's painfully obvious that she's been cast [here] because of the genre resonance she brings to the table".

=== 2019–present: Return to mainstream projects ===
Hamilton returned to the Terminator franchise and the character of Sarah Connor when she headlined the Tim Miller–directed Terminator: Dark Fate (2019), set 25 years after the events of T2. She admitted to being reluctant to sign on to the project, having spent the previous few years away from the spotlight: "I love my alone time like no one you've ever met ... That was my hesitation: Do I want to trade this lovely, authentic life [that I've built] for that? I didn't want my neighbours looking at me differently. We're neighbors because of who we are, not what we do, and I don't want that to creep into my life again".

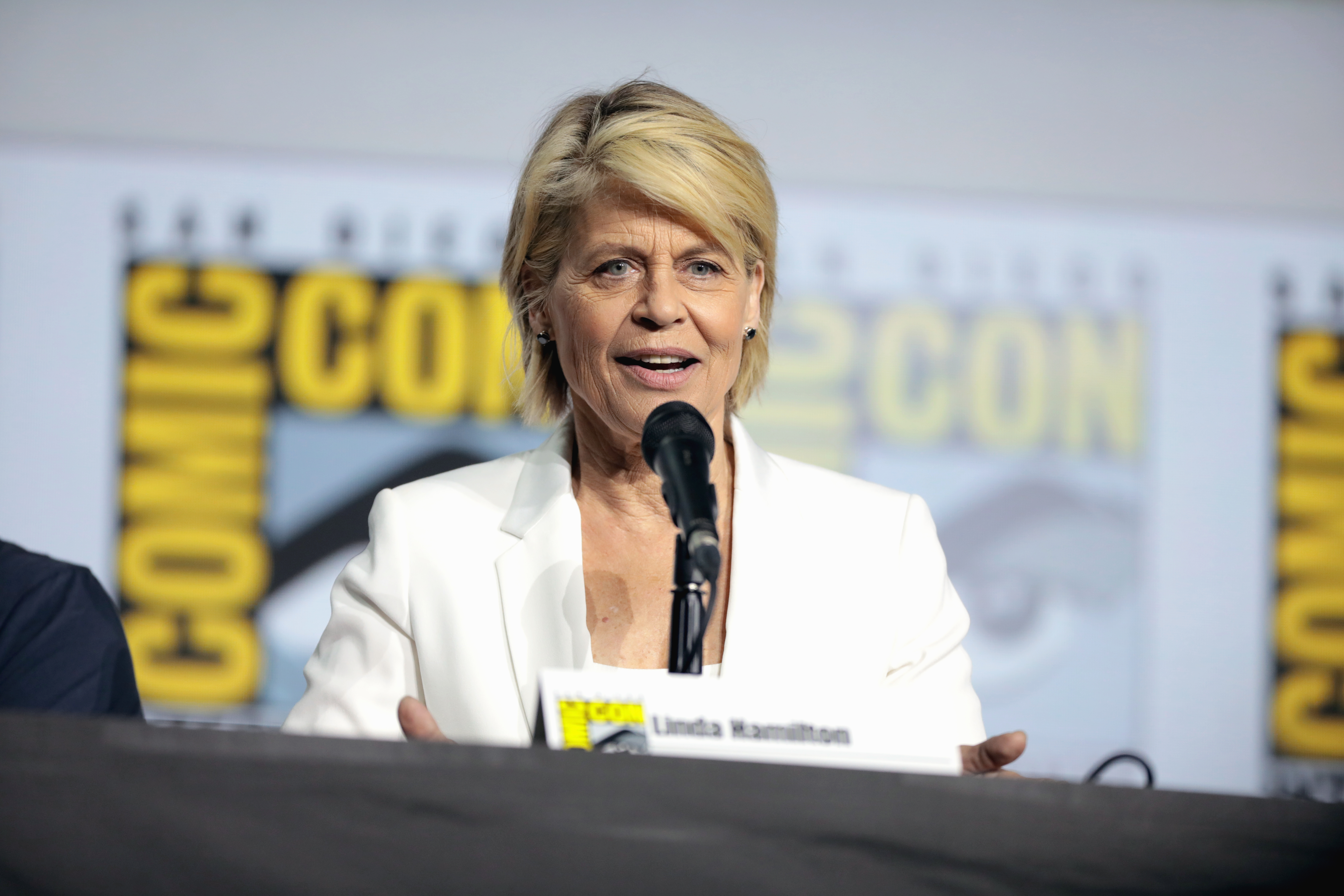
Hamilton at San Diego Comic Con, 2019

Filming of Dark Fate took place in Hungary, Spain and the U.S. between May and November 2018. The film was a financial disappointment and was met with mixed reviews, though Hamilton's performance was praised. Writing for Rolling Stone, David Fear felt that she provided the film's "sinew, heart, and soul", and said of her introduction:

A truck pulls up, we see boots hit the ground, and there she is: Sarah Connor 1.0, sunglasses on, stoic and iconic as fuck, gunning down a sprinting shape-shifter and employing a rocket launcher for a finishing move. It's the sort of movie entrance that the character (and the actor) deserves, the kind that prompts spontaneous, uncontrollable cheering in theaters ... Her weathered survivor will charitably share the screen with newcomers and old co-stars alike, but from this moment on, Dark Fate is Hamilton's property. She calmly slips the superior sequel into the back pocket of her faded work pants and walks away with it. Everyone else is acting in her movie.

Later that year, Hamilton was named Best Actress at the Los Angeles Crime and Horror Film Festival for her portrayal of "King George"—a ruthless crime boss—in Easy Does It, which Film Threat described as "excellent ... a throwback to grindhouse adventure films [and westerns]". She began appearing as General McCallister on Syfy's Resident Alien in 2021, which IndieWire called a "genre-bending ... spry half-hour comedy [series]". Also that year, she guest-starred as a hippie life coach in six episodes of the TNT dark comedy Claws during its final season.

In June 2023, it was announced that Hamilton had been cast in an undisclosed role for the fifth and final season of the Netflix science fiction horror series Stranger Things. Her character was later revealed to be Dr. Kay, a villainous military researcher. The season premiered in November 2025. A self-proclaimed fan of the series, she said, "I don't know how to be a fangirl and an actress at the same time. I'm going to work on that." In a 2025 interview with Variety, she said she had been considering retirement from acting due to a long-term hip issue before being cast in Stranger Things, but decided to join the series after the show's creators, the Duffer Brothers, personally expressed their enthusiasm for her involvement.

On September 8, 2026, it was announced that Hamilton was cast in the upcoming sports comedy Hot Curlers.

== Personal life ==
Hamilton's twin sister Leslie died at the age of 63 on August 22, 2020. Leslie appeared as Hamilton's double in a few scenes of Terminator 2, including the scene in which the T-1000 disguises itself as Sarah Connor.

Hamilton is a supporter of the Democratic Party, but voted for Republican candidate Arnold Schwarzenegger—her Terminator co-star—in the 2003 California election after his campaign convinced her he was suitable for the job. While filming Terminator 2, she suffered permanent hearing damage in one ear when she forgot to put in her earplugs during a scene which called for Schwarzenegger's character to fire a shotgun inside an elevator.

Hamilton is an advocate for natural aging.

=== Marriage and relationships ===
Hamilton has been married and divorced twice. Her first marriage was to actor Bruce Abbott from 1982 to 1989. He left Hamilton when she was pregnant with their son Dalton, who was born in 1989. She later said that Abbott left due to her mood swings and physical abuse towards him stemming from her bipolar disorder, and she publicly apologized to him 14 years later in 2004.

In 1991, Hamilton began a relationship and moved in with filmmaker James Cameron after they had filmed Terminator 2 together. Their daughter was born in 1993, after which Hamilton said she experienced postpartum depression. Hamilton and Cameron briefly separated when Cameron was filming Titanic due to his affair with actress Suzy Amis, but reconciled and married in 1997. They divorced in 1999, which resulted in a $50 million settlement for Hamilton. She explained that they divorced because of her struggles with bipolar disorder, his relationship with Amis, them being "terribly mismatched", and Cameron's intense dedication to his work; she told The Sun, "Titanic was the mistress he left me for."

In 2019, Hamilton told The New York Times that she had been celibate for at least 15 years: "One loses track, because it just doesn't matter—or at least it doesn't matter to me. I have a very romantic relationship with my world every day and the people who are in it."

=== Mental health ===
Hamilton started to binge eat when she entered high school. After seeing a psychologist for the first time at the age of 22 in 1978–1979, she thought acting would help her feel better, but she ended up having a breakdown in the beginning of her acting career and turned to drugs and alcohol use and self-medicated with cocaine in order to get her confidence up. In an October 2005 appearance on Larry King Live, Hamilton discussed her depression and bipolar disorder, which led to violent mood swings and suicidal thoughts during her marriage to Abbott and, in her view, caused the failure of both her marriages. She also discussed how she eventually received therapy and medication to manage the condition.

== Accolades ==
Selected accolades for Linda Hamilton
Year	Association	Category	Nominated work	Result	Ref.
1985	Saturn Awards	Best Actress	The Terminator	Nominated	
1988	Golden Globe Awards	Best Actress – Drama Series	Beauty and the Beast	Nominated	
1989	Golden Globe Awards	Best Actress – Drama Series	Beauty and the Beast	Nominated	
1989	Primetime Emmy Awards	Lead Actress in a Drama Series	Beauty and the Beast	Nominated	
1989	Viewers for Quality Television	Best Actress in a Quality Drama Series	Beauty and the Beast	Nominated	
1990	Romy Awards	Audience Award - Favorite Actress in a Series	Beauty and the Beast	Won	
1990	Saturn Awards	Best Genre TV Actress	Beauty and the Beast	Won	
1991	Awards Circuit Community Awards	Best Actress in a Leading Role	Terminator 2: Judgment Day	Nominated	
1991	Bravo Otto	Best Female Film Star	—N/a	Runner-up	
1992	Fangoria Chainsaw Awards	Best Actress	Terminator 2: Judgment Day	Nominated	
1992	MTV Movie Awards	Best Female Performance	Terminator 2: Judgment Day	Won	
1992	MTV Movie Awards	Most Desirable Female	Terminator 2: Judgment Day	Won	
1992	Saturn Awards	Best Actress	Terminator 2: Judgment Day	Won	
1995	CableACE Awards	Actress in a Movie or Miniseries	A Mother's Prayer	Won	
1996	Golden Globe Awards	Best Actress – Miniseries or Television Film	A Mother's Prayer	Nominated	
1998	Blockbuster Entertainment Awards	Favorite Actress	Dante's Peak	Won	
2000	Satellite Awards	Best Actress – Miniseries or Television Film	The Color of Courage	Won	
2001	DVD Exclusive Awards	Best Supporting Actress	Skeletons in the Closet	Won	
2015	Artemis Women in Action Film Festival	Action Icon	Terminator 2: Judgment Day	Won	
2016	Hollywood International Moving Pictures Film Festival	Best Ensemble Cast	Shoot Me Nicely	Won	
2016	NYC Indie Film Awards	Best Actress	Shoot Me Nicely	Won	
2016	Williamsburg Independent Film Festival	Best Featured Actress	Shoot Me Nicely	Won	
2017	Austin Revolution Film Festival	Best Actress in a Series	Shoot Me Nicely	Nominated	
2017	European Independent Film Awards	Diamond Award for Best Actress	Shoot Me Nicely	Won	
2017	Golden Door Film Festival	Best Actress in a Short Film	Shoot Me Nicely	Won	
2017	L.A. Shorts Awards	Best Actress	Shoot Me Nicely	Won	
2017	Northeast Film Festival	Best Supporting Actress in a Short Film	Shoot Me Nicely	Nominated	
2019	CinemaCon	Best Ensemble	Terminator: Dark Fate	Won	
2019	Los Angeles Crime and Horror Film Festival	Best Actress	Easy Does It	Won	
2021	Saturn Awards	Best Supporting Actress	Terminator: Dark Fate	Nominated	
