= Glucerna =

Brand of nutritional products

- Product type: Feeding tube products, diabetes products
- Produced by: Abbott Laboratories
- Country: United States
- Introduced: 1989; 37 years ago
- Related brands: EleCare; Pedialyte; PediaSure; Similac; Ensure; Nepro
- Markets: Worldwide (more than 130 countries)
- Ambassadors: Cathy Freeman; Mother Love
- Website: glucerna.com

Glucerna is the brand name of a family of tube feeding formula, bottled or canned shakes, and snack bars manufactured by Abbott Laboratories. It was introduced to the public in 1989. These medical nutritional products are meant for people with diabetes and are promoted for their ability to satisfy hunger without causing rapid increases in glucose concentration in the bloodstream.

== Products ==
Tube feeding products include Glucerna 1.0Cal, Glucerna 1.2Cal, and Glucerna 1.5Cal. Bottled or canned products include Glucerna Shake, Glucerna Advance Shake, Glucerna HungerSmart Shake, Glucerna Snack Shake, and Glucerna Therapeutic Nutrition Shake. Snack bar products include Glucerna Mini Snack Bars and Glucerna Crispy Delights Nutrition Bars.

== Composition and properties ==
Glucerna products are formulated with fat, protein, vitamins, minerals, and carbohydrates including CarbSteady, proprietary carbohydrate blend containing sucromalt that is characterized by a reduced glycemic index of approximately 53. Some Glucerna products contain chromium picolinate, and phytosterols. There is evidence that phytosterols may help lower cholesterol, but the efficacy of chromium supplementation has not been fully agreed among experts.

The glycemic index of Glucerna shakes is approximately 31 relative to a value of 100 for pure glucose, while the snack bar has been found to produce less than a third of the glycemic response of a conventional snack bar. A scientific review concluded that diabetic snack bars, such as Glucerna snack bars, can be useful for weight control and for blunting hyperglycemia but are not suitable for treating hyperglycemia.

Like most premade foods, Glucerna products can be expensive compared with alternative healthy foods prepared at home.
