= Robin Givens =

American stage, television, and film actress (born 1964)

- Born: Robin Simone Givens; November 27, 1964 (age 61); New York City, New York, U.S.
- Education: Sarah Lawrence College
- Occupations: Actress, model, director
- Years active: 1978–present
- Spouses: Mike Tyson (m. 1988; div. 1989); Svetozar Marinković (m. 1997; div. 1998)
- Partner(s): Murphy Jensen (1999–2002)
- Children: 2

Robin Givens (born November 27, 1964) is an American actress and director. Givens played Darlene Merriman in the ABC sitcom Head of the Class in 1986, and remained on the series for its five year duration. Her marriage to boxer Mike Tyson in 1988 drew considerable media attention, as did their divorce. She later went on to become a spokesperson for the National Domestic Violence Hotline for several years.

Givens continued her career with film and television roles such as The Women of Brewster Place (1989) and Boomerang (1992). In 1996, Givens co-starred on the sitcom Sparks, which aired for two seasons on UPN. In January 2000, she took over hosting duties on the syndicated talk show Forgive or Forget. In 2007, Givens released her autobiography, Grace Will Lead Me Home. She has since had recurring roles on The Game, Tyler Perry's House of Payne, Chuck, Riverdale and its spin-off Katy Keene, and has been part of the main cast of Batwoman. In 2020, Givens began working as a television and film director.

== Early life ==
Givens' mother raised Robin and her sister Stephanie in Mount Vernon and New Rochelle, New York. Givens was raised Catholic. She occasionally modeled and acted as a teen. As a model, she appeared in magazines such as Seventeen and Mademoiselle. She made her film debut at age 14 in the film The Wiz (1978) as a guest at Aunt Emma's Party.

Givens graduated from New Rochelle Academy (a private school which closed in June 1987). At the age of 15, she enrolled at Sarah Lawrence College as a pre-medical major, becoming one of the youngest to attend the school. While in school she acted in daytime dramas. She graduated at the age of 19 in 1984. Givens claimed to have dropped out of Harvard Medical School to focus on her acting career, but the registrar's office stated that she never applied.

== Career ==
=== 1980s–1990s ===
In 1985, Givens auditioned for a guest spot on The Cosby Show. She won the spot and Bill Cosby became her mentor. He persuaded her to drop out of school and promised that if she was not successful in two years, he would get her back into medical school and pay her tuition. Soon after Givens appeared in Diff'rent Strokes and the 1986 television film Beverly Hills Madam, opposite Faye Dunaway. That same year, she landed her breakthrough role as rich girl Darlene Merriman on the ABC sitcom Head of the Class. The series lasted five seasons, ending in 1991. In 1989, while starring in Head of the Class, she appeared in The Women of Brewster Place with Oprah Winfrey. She later starred in the feature films A Rage in Harlem (1991) and Boomerang (1992).

In 1994, Givens posed nude for Playboy magazine. During that period Givens felt she had lost her voice, so one of the reasons why she posed for the magazine was so that she could write her own article. Givens was ranked No. 88 on Empire magazine's "100 Sexiest Stars in Film History" list in May 1995. In 1996, Givens portrayed Claudia in the television movie The Face (also known as A Face to Die For) with Yasmine Bleeth. Later that year, she co-starred in the UPN sitcom Sparks, which ended its run in 1998. She also played Denise in The Fresh Prince of Bel-Air.

=== 2000s–2010s ===
In January 2000, Givens appeared in a cameo in Toni Braxton's music video "He Wasn't Man Enough", as the wife of a cheating husband. She returned to the entertainment industry later that year as the host of the talk show Forgive or Forget, replacing television personality Mother Love halfway through the show's second season. Ratings initially increased after Givens took over hosting duties, but soon fell. The series was canceled after this season.

In 2006, Givens attempted a return to television on MyNetworkTV's telenovela Saints and Sinners, but the show garnered low ratings and was soon canceled. Givens continued acting in made-for-television films while also making appearances on Trinity Broadcasting Network's Praise the Lord program (July 12, 2007), and Larry King Live. In June 2007, she released her autobiography Grace Will Lead Me Home. Givens returned to feature films in Tyler Perry's Southern drama The Family That Preys (2008). She also had a recurring role portraying a fictionalized version of herself on the CW comedy-drama The Game. Additionally, she has had a recurring role on the TBS show Tyler Perry's House of Payne, and a guest role on USA Network's Burn Notice.

In addition to television and film roles, Givens has performed onstage. In 2001, she appeared in an off-Broadway production of The Vagina Monologues. From February to April 16, 2006, she played the role of Roxie Hart in the Broadway play Chicago. In 2007, she toured the country playing a part in the I'm Ready Productions play Men, Money & Golddiggers. Givens starred in the 2009 stage play A Mother's Prayer, which also starred Johnny Gill, Shirley Murdock, and Jermaine Crawford.

In 2007, Givens published a memoir entitled Grace Will Lead Me Home. In it, she reflects on the life of her praying grandmother, Grace, her experiences of domestic violence, her strong will to survive, feeling abandoned by her father, and her faith in God. In 2011, she guest-starred in three episodes of NBC's spy-comedy Chuck: "Chuck Versus the Masquerade", "Chuck Versus the A-Team", and "Chuck Versus the Muuurder", as Jane Bentley. Later that year, she performed as Angel, a struggling blues singer, in the play Blues for An Alabama Sky at Pasadena Playhouse. In 2015, she starred alongside Clifton Powell, Mishon Ratliff, and Malachi Malik in the segment "Mama's Boy" of TV One's anthology romance horror film Fear Files. From 2017 to 2021, she appeared in teen drama series Riverdale and its spin-off Katy Keene.

Givens was the spokesperson for the National Domestic Violence Hotline for several years.

In 2017, Givens hosted the San Diego Black Film Festival as she had for the several previous years.

=== 2020s ===
In 2020, Givens made her directorial debut with the Lifetime mystery thriller film, A Murder to Remember. She later directed films Favorite Son (2021) and its sequel, Favorite Son Christmas (2023), A Jenkins Family Christmas (2021) and The Christmas Clapback (2022), all for BET+. In 2021, she directed the horror films Haunted Trail and Horror Noire. In 2023 she directed the comedy film, The Nana Project.

In 2021, Givens was cast in season three of Batwoman as Jada Jet, the CEO of Jeturian Industries and Ryan Wilder's biological mother who is based on Jezebel Jet.

In 2022, Givens appeared in the Lifetime film He's Not Worth Dying For as part of its "Ripped from the Headlines" feature films that was inspired by the feud of Rachel Wade and Sarah Ludemann. She portrayed Cher Heinemann, the mother of Grace Heinemann who was based on Ludemann.

Givens directed episodes of television series Riverdale, Dynasty, Nancy Drew, So Help Me Todd and Elsbeth.

== Personal life ==
Mike Tyson and Robin Givens in July 1988

Givens began dating boxer Mike Tyson in 1987. According to Givens, Tyson was physically abusive before they wed on February 7, 1988. Tyson stated that he was "severely traumatized by that relationship." Tyson was then estimated to be worth $50 million, but he and Givens did not have a prenuptial agreement. During their marriage, Givens bought a $4.3 million mansion in the affluent suburb of Bernardsville, New Jersey with money withdrawn from Tyson's brokerage account. They appeared in a Diet Pepsi commercial together and on the cover of Life magazine.

After her miscarriage in June 1988, their marriage began to fall apart. Tyson claims Givens' pregnancy and miscarriage were part of a ruse to rush him into marriage, claiming that in all the time she was supposedly pregnant, Givens never gained a pound. In a joint interview with Tyson on 20/20 in September 1988, Givens told Barbara Walters that life with him was "torture, pure hell, worse than anything I could possibly imagine," and she went on to describe his volatile temper. In October 1988, Givens filed for divorce, citing spousal abuse and was granted a temporary restraining order. Her attorney Marvin Mitchelson said, "She loves Michael Tyson, but there is continued violence, and she fears for her safety." Tyson sought an annulment, accusing her of stealing millions of dollars and manipulating the public. Givens responded by filing a $125 million libel suit for defamation. Their divorce was finalized on Valentine's Day in 1989.

Givens received negative press following her split from Tyson, particularly within the sports and African-American communities. Headlines heralded her as "the Most Hated Woman in America" and she was described as a "gold digger who married Tyson solely for his millions." Givens denied that she received a reported divorce settlement of over $10 million from Tyson, stating that she "didn't receive one dime."

According to the 1989 biography Fire and Fear: The Inside Story of Mike Tyson, Tyson admitted he punched Givens, stating "that was the best punch I've ever thrown in my entire life." Tyson later claimed the book was "filled with inaccuracies." In 2009, Tyson joked about "socking" Givens on Oprah, which caused laughter in the audience. Winfrey later issued an apology to Givens.

In 1993, Givens adopted her first son, Michael "Buddy" Givens. In 1997, she married her tennis instructor, Svetozar Marinković. Givens filed for divorce months later. In 1999, she had a biological son, William "Billy" Jensen, with ex-boyfriend, tennis player Murphy Jensen.

In January 2004, Givens struck a pedestrian while driving an SUV through a Miami, Florida, intersection. Givens was ticketed for failing to use due care with a pedestrian in a crosswalk, but the charges were later dismissed. In June 2004, the injured party filed a civil lawsuit against Givens for an unspecified amount.

A May 7, 2009, article in Forbes magazine reported that the Internal Revenue Service was suing Givens for unpaid federal income taxes totaling $292,000 ($438,000 in present-day USD when adjusted for inflation), an amount which included interest and penalties. The government had asked a federal court in Florida for a judgment against her on 39 assessments covering a span of eight years.

== Filmography ==
=== Acting ===
==== Film ====
Year	Title	Role	Notes
1978	The Wiz	Guest at Aunt Emma's Party	
1986	Beverly Hills Madam	April Baxter	TV movie
1989	The Penthouse	Dinah St. Clair	TV movie
1991	A Rage in Harlem	Imabelle	
1992	Boomerang	Jacqueline Broyer	
1993	Angel Street	Det. Anita King	TV movie
1994	Foreign Student	April	
1994	Blankman	Kimberly Jonz	
1995	Dangerous Intentions	Kaye Ferrar	TV movie
1996	A Face to Die For	Claudia	TV movie
1998	Secrets	-	Short
1999	Michael Jordan: An American Hero	Juanita Vanoy	TV movie
2000	Everything's Jake	Publisher	
2000	The Expendables	Randy	TV movie
2001	The Elite	Ashe	
2001	Spinning Out of Control	Erin	TV movie
2002	Book of Love	Iyanna	
2002	Antibody	Dr. Rachel Saverini	Video
2003	Head of State	Kim	
2003	A Good Night to Die	Dana	
2003	Love Chronicles	Monifa Burly	
2003	Hollywood Wives: The New Generation	Kyndra	TV movie
2005	Flip The Script	Rain Jones	
2005	Captive Hearts	Jade Marlo	TV movie
2006	Restraining Order	Diane McNeil	
2008	The Family That Preys	Abigail "Abby" Dexter	
2009	God Send Me a Man	Kim	
2009	Little Hercules In 3-D	Dana	
2009	Sounds of Poetry	Eleanor	Short
2009	Preaching to the Pastor	Dr. Leslie Williams	
2009	A Mother's Prayer	Brenda	Video
2010	Enemies Among Us	Gloria	
2011	Church Girl	Cat	
2011	Should've Put a Ring on It	Sherri	
2011	Breathe	Nurse Nancy	
2011	The Love You Save	Alexis	TV movie
2012	Waiting for Angels	Jack's Daughter	Video
2013	Je'Caryous Johnson's Marriage Material	Shauna	
2013	Will a Man Rob God?	Mrs. Alexis	Video
2013	JK's House	Dr. Amber Jenkins	
2014	Airplane Vs Volcano	Lisa Whitmore	Video
2014	Four Seasons	Helen	
2014	Unspoken Words	Mrs. Lewis	
2014	On Angel's Wings	Amber	
2015	Fear Files	Elaine Channing	TV movie
2015	Perfect Match	Wedding Coordinator	TV movie
2015	A Christmas to Remember	Veronica	
2016	Definitely Divorcing	April	
2016	The Perfect Match	Geneva	
2016	God's Not Dead 2	Principal Kinney	
2017	Dreams I Never Had	Prosecuting Attorney Hernandez	
2018	The Products of the American Ghetto	Penny	
2018	God Bless the Broken Road	Kareena Williams	
2018	Never Heard	Shala Davis	
2019	Gully	Irma	
2020	The Sin Choice	Grace Thompson	
2020	Dear Christmas	Penny	TV movie
2021	Saints & Sinners Judgment Day	Wilhelmina Parker	TV movie
2022	Last Looks	Fontella Davis	
2022	Kimi	Angela's Mother	
2022	He's Not Worth Dying For	Cher	TV movie
2022	A New Diva's Christmas Carol	Sahra	TV movie
2023	The Nana Project	Director	
2023	Christmas Rescue	Mama Rose	TV movie

==== Television ====
Year	Title	Role	Notes
1985	The Cosby Show	Susanne	Episode: "Theo and the Older Woman"
1985	Guiding Light	Diana	Episode: "Episode #1.9784"
1986	Soul Train	Herself	Episode: "Al Jarreau/Vesta Williams"
1986	Diff'rent Strokes	Ann	Episode: "The Big Bribe"
1986	Philip Marlowe, Private Eye	Token Ware	Episode: "Pickup on Noon Street"
1986–1991	Head of the Class	Darlene Merriman	Main role
1987	Hollywood Squares	Herself/Panelist	Episode: "April 27, 1987"
1988	Sonny Spoon	Alvita	Episode: "Crimes Below the Waist"
1989	The Women of Brewster Place	Kiswana/Melanie Browne	Miniseries
1992	Angel Street	Detective Anita King	Main role
1995	Me and the Boys	Nina	Recurring role
1995	The Fresh Prince of Bel-Air	Denise	Episode: "Cold Feet, Hot Body"
1995	Courthouse	Suzanne Graham	Main role
1996	In the House	Alex Peterson	Recurring role
1996–1998	Sparks	Wilma Cuthbert	Main role
1997	Moesha	Ladonna	Episode: "Strike a Pose"
1999	The Love Boat: The Next Wave	Dana Chase	Episode: "Don't Judge a Book by Its Lover"
1999	Cosby	Ms. Malone	Recurring role
2000	Hollywood Squares	Herself/Panelist	Recurring role
2000	Intimate Portrait	Herself	Episode: "Robin Givens"
2000	Forgive or Forget	Herself	Host
2000	Chicken Soup for the Soul	Counselor	Episode: "The Right Thing"
2000	DAG	Jennifer	Episode: "Jennifer Returns"
2003	Driven	Herself	Episode: "Mike Tyson"
2003–2004	One on One	Sheila	Recurring role
2007	Saints & Sinners	Kelly Mitchell	Episode: "Plumbing Problems"
2008	The Game	Herself	Recurring role
2008	Tyler Perry's House of Payne	Tanya	Recurring role
2008	Burn Notice	Kandi	Episode: "Scatter Point"
2008	Everybody Hates Chris	Stacy	Episode: "Everybody Hates Doc's"
2010	My Parents, My Sister & Me	Keela Goldman	Main role
2010	Drop Dead Diva	Ann Simpson	Episode: "A Mother's Secret"
2010	Nikita	Mary Miracle	Episode: "All the Way"
2011	Chuck	Director Jane Bentley	Recurring role
2011	Reed Between the Lines	Dominique	Episode: "Let's Talk About Jealousy"
2012	RuPaul's Drag U	Herself	Episode: "Revenge of the Nerds"
2012	Suburgatory	Tulsa	Episode: "Independence Day"
2012	Retired at 35	Dr. Keller	Episode: "The Dates"
2012	Are We There Yet?		Episode: "Open Mic Gaffe"
2013	90210	Cheryl Harwood	Recurring role
2013	Twisted	Judy	Recurring role
2013	The First Family	Melanie	Episode: "The First Pageant"
2016	Unsung Hollywood	Herself	Episode: "Eartha Kitt"
2016	Man Seeking Woman	Vicki Claus	Episode: "Tinsel"
2016	Lucifer	Leila Simms	Episode: "Sin-Eater"
2017	About Him 2: The Revolution	Dr. Alfeni Henderson	Main role
2017	Malibu Dan the Family Man	Jessica Dankles	Recurring role
2017–2018	Once Upon a Time	Eudora	Recurring role
2017–2021	Riverdale	Sierra McCoy	Recurring role
2018	Saints & Sinners	Wilhelmina Hayworth	Recurring role
2018	The Bold and the Beautiful	Dr. Phillips	Main role
2019	25 Words or Less	Herself	Recurring role
2019	The Fix	Julianne Johnson	Recurring role
2019	Ambitions	Stephanie Carlisle	Main role
2019–2022	Step Up	Dana	Recurring role
2020	Worst Cooks in America	Herself	Main role
2020	Katy Keene	Sierra McCoy	Episode: "Chapter Six: Mama Said"
2021	Head of the Class	Darlene Merriman	Recurring role
2021–2022	Batwoman	Jada Jet	Main role
2022	Queens	Robin	Episode: "Let the Past Be the Past"
2026	All's Fair	Aphrodite Lovesong	Episode: "The Scorpion Ball"

=== Directing ===
==== Film ====
Year	Title	Notes
2020	A Murder to Remember	
2021	Favorite Son	
2021	A Jenkins Family Christmas	
2021	Horror Noire	
2021	Haunted Trail	Also producer
2022	The Christmas Clapback	
2023	Favorite Son Christmas	
2023	The Nana Project	

==== Television ====
Year	Title	Episodes
2021	Riverdale	2 episodes
2022	Dynasty	Episode: "There's No Need to Panic"
2023	Nancy Drew	Episode: "The Memory of the Stolen Soul"
2024	So Help Me Todd	Episode: "Dial Margaret for Murder"
2024–2026	Elsbeth	4 episodes
2026	Best Medicine	Episode: "Back to the Suture"

=== Music videos ===
Year	Song	Artist
2000	"He Wasn't Man Enough"	Toni Braxton
2019	"Shoes"	Mina Tobias

== Awards and nominations ==
Year	Award	Result	Category	Film
1991	ShoWest Convention, USA	Won	Female Star of Tomorrow	
2004	Black Reel Awards	Nominated	Television: Best Supporting Actress	Hollywood Wives: The New Generation

== Books ==
- Givens, Robin (June 7, 2007). Grace Will Lead Me Home. New York: Miramax. ISBN 978-1-4013-5246-2.
