= Ensure =

American brand of nutritional supplements

- June 2012 Ensure product lineup
- Product type: Dietary supplement, Meal replacement
- Current owner: Abbott Laboratories
- Country: United States
- Introduced: 1973; 53 years ago
- Related brands: EleCare; Pedialyte; Similac; Glucerna; Nepro
- Markets: 160 countries
- Previous owners: Moores & Ross Milk Company
- Website: www.ensure.com

Ensure is an American brand of nutritional supplements and meal replacements manufactured by Abbott Laboratories.

A 237-ml (8-fl oz) bottle of Ensure Original contains 220 calories, six grams of fat, 15 grams of sugar, and nine grams of protein. The top six ingredients are water, corn maltodextrin, sugar, milk protein concentrate, canola oil, and soy protein isolate. Ensure is considered lactose-free for people with lactose intolerance.

== History ==
In 1903, Harry C. Moores and Stanley M. Ross launched the "Moores & Ross Milk Company", which specialized in bottling milk for home delivery for the first few years. By 1964, however, the company merged with Abbott Laboratories. A drink called Ensure was first marketed by Ross Laboratories in 1973.

In the 1990s, Ensure and other nutritional drink products like Mead Johnson's Sustacal and Nestlé's Boost and Resource brands were fiercely competing to capture market share among healthy adults. In 1996, Ensure had sales of about $300 million and accounted for 80% of protein supplement sales; Abbott spent $45.4 million to advertise Ensure during the first nine months of 1996, around 70% more than it spent during the same period of 1995.

When Abbott split off its pharmaceuticals division, Abbvie, in 2013, the Ensure product line remained with Abbott along with other nutritional products.

== Criticism ==
In 1995, the Center for Science in the Public Interest said that ads for Ensure were "the most misleading food ad" of that year. In 1997, Abbott settled charges from the Federal Trade Commission that it was falsely marketing Ensure as having similar amounts of vitamins as multivitamin supplements, and as recommended by doctors more than any other nutritional supplement as a way for people to stay active and healthy.
