= Electrolyte =

Substance whose dissolved ions conduct electricity

An electrolyte is a substance that conducts electricity through the movement of ions, but not through the movement of electrons. This includes most soluble salts, acids, and bases, dissolved in a polar solvent like water. Upon dissolving, the substance separates into cations and anions, which disperse uniformly throughout the solvent. Solid-state electrolytes also exist. In medicine and sometimes in chemistry, the term electrolyte refers to the substance that is dissolved.

Electrically, such a solution is neutral. If an electric potential is applied to such a solution, the cations of the solution are drawn to the electrode that has an abundance of electrons, while the anions are drawn to the electrode that has a deficit of electrons. The movement of anions and cations in opposite directions within the solution amounts to a current. Some gases, such as hydrogen chloride (HCl), under conditions of high temperature or low pressure can also function as electrolytes. Electrolyte solutions can also result from the dissolution of some biological (e.g., DNA, polypeptides) or synthetic polymers (e.g., polystyrene sulfonate), termed "polyelectrolytes", which contain charged functional groups. A substance that dissociates into ions in solution or when molten acquires the capacity to conduct electricity. Sodium, potassium, chloride, calcium, magnesium, and phosphate ions in a liquid phase are examples of electrolytes.

In medicine, electrolyte replacement is needed when a person has prolonged vomiting or diarrhea, and as a response to sweating due to strenuous athletic activity. Commercial electrolyte solutions are available, particularly for sick children (such as oral rehydration solution, Suero Oral, or Pedialyte) and athletes (sports drinks). Electrolyte monitoring is important in the treatment of anorexia and bulimia.

In science, electrolytes are one of the main components of electrochemical cells.

In clinical medicine, mentions of electrolytes usually refer metonymically to the ions, and (especially) to their concentrations (in blood, serum, urine, or other fluids). Thus, mentions of electrolyte levels usually refer to the various ion concentrations, not to the fluid volumes.

== Etymology ==
The word electrolyte derives from Ancient Greek ήλεκτρο- (ēlectro-), prefix originally meaning amber but in modern contexts related to electricity, and λυτός (lytos), meaning "able to be taken apart".

== History ==
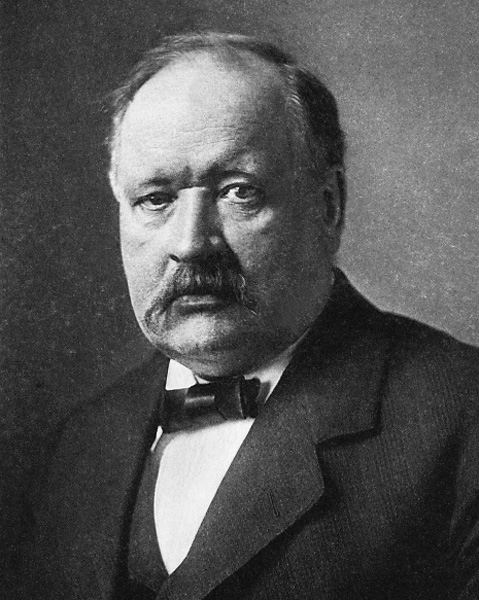
Svante Arrhenius, father of the concept of electrolyte dissociation in aqueous solution for which he received the Nobel Prize in Chemistry in 1903

In his 1884 dissertation, Svante Arrhenius put forth his explanation of solid crystalline salts disassociating into paired charged particles when dissolved, for which he won the 1903 Nobel Prize in Chemistry. Arrhenius's explanation was that in forming a solution, the salt dissociates into charged particles, to which Michael Faraday (1791–1867) had given the name "ions" many years earlier. Faraday's belief had been that ions were produced in the process of electrolysis. Arrhenius proposed that, even in the absence of an electric current, solutions of salts contained ions. He thus proposed that chemical reactions in solution were reactions between ions.

Shortly after Arrhenius's hypothesis of ions, Franz Hofmeister and Siegmund Lewith found that different ion types displayed different effects on such things as the solubility of proteins. A consistent ordering of these different ions on the magnitude of their effect arises consistently in many other systems as well. This has since become known as the Hofmeister series.

While the origins of these effects are not abundantly clear and have been debated throughout the past century, it has been suggested that the charge density of these ions is important and might actually have explanations originating from the work of Charles-Augustin de Coulomb over 200 years ago.

== Formation ==
Electrolyte solutions are normally formed when salt is placed into a solvent such as water and the individual components dissociate due to the thermodynamic interactions between solvent and solute molecules, in a process called "solvation". For example, when table salt (sodium chloride), NaCl, is placed in water, the salt (a solid) dissolves into its component ions, according to the dissociation reaction:

NaCl_{(s)} → Na^{+}_{(aq)} + Cl^{−}_{(aq)}

It is also possible for substances to react with water, producing ions. For example, carbon dioxide gas dissolves in water to produce a solution that contains hydronium, carbonate, and hydrogen carbonate ions.

Molten salts can also be electrolytes as, for example, when sodium chloride is molten, the liquid conducts electricity. In particular, ionic liquids, which are molten salts with melting points below 100 °C, are a type of highly conductive non-aqueous electrolytes and thus have found more and more applications in fuel cells and batteries. Additionally, highly concentrated electrolytes, or solvent-in-salt electrolytes, are a promising type of electrolyte whereby the concentration of salt exceeds 3 M.

An electrolyte in a solution may be described as "concentrated" if it has a high concentration of ions, or "dilute" if it has a low concentration. If a high proportion of the solute dissociates to form free ions, the electrolyte is strong; if most of the solute does not dissociate, the electrolyte is weak. The properties of electrolytes may be exploited using electrolysis to extract constituent elements and compounds contained within the solution.

Alkaline earth metals form hydroxides that are strong electrolytes with limited solubility in water, due to the strong attraction between their constituent ions. This limits their application to situations where high solubility is required.

In 2021, researchers have found that electrolyte can "substantially facilitate electrochemical corrosion studies in less conductive media".

== Physiological importance ==
In physiology, the primary ions of electrolytes are sodium (Na^{+}), potassium (K^{+}), calcium (Ca^{2+}), magnesium (Mg^{2+}), chloride (Cl^{−}), hydrogen phosphate (HPO_{4}^{2−}), and hydrogen carbonate (HCO_{3}^{−}). The electric charge symbols of plus (+) and minus (−) indicate that the substance is ionic in nature and has an imbalanced distribution of electrons, the result of chemical dissociation. Sodium is the main electrolyte found in extracellular fluid and potassium is the main intracellular electrolyte; both are involved in fluid balance and blood pressure control.

All known multicellular lifeforms require a subtle and complex electrolyte balance between the intracellular and extracellular environments. In particular, the maintenance of precise osmotic gradients of electrolytes is important. Such gradients affect and regulate the hydration of the body as well as blood pH, and are critical for nerve and muscle function. Various mechanisms exist in living species that keep the concentrations of different electrolytes under tight control.

Both muscle tissue and neurons are considered electric tissues of the body. Muscles and neurons are activated by electrolyte activity between the extracellular fluid or interstitial fluid, and intracellular fluid. Electrolytes may enter or leave the cell membrane through specialized protein structures embedded in the plasma membrane called "ion channels". For example, muscle contraction is dependent upon the presence of calcium (Ca^{2+}), sodium (Na^{+}), and potassium (K^{+}). Without sufficient levels of these key electrolytes, muscle weakness or severe muscle contractions may occur.

Electrolyte balance is maintained by oral, or in emergencies, intravenous (IV) intake of electrolyte-containing substances, and is regulated by hormones, in general with the kidneys flushing out excess levels. In humans, electrolyte homeostasis is regulated by hormones such as antidiuretic hormones, aldosterone and parathyroid hormones. Serious electrolyte disturbances, such as dehydration and overhydration, may lead to cardiac and neurological complications and, unless they are rapidly resolved, will result in a medical emergency.

=== Measurement ===
Measurement of electrolytes is a commonly performed diagnostic procedure, performed via blood testing with ion-selective electrodes or urinalysis by medical technologists. The interpretation of these values is somewhat meaningless without analysis of the clinical history and is often impossible without parallel measurements of renal function. The electrolytes measured most often are sodium and potassium. Chloride levels are rarely measured except for arterial blood gas interpretations since they are inherently linked to sodium levels. One important test conducted on urine is the specific gravity test to determine the occurrence of an electrolyte imbalance.

Conductivity cells are another kind of tools used to measure the electrolyte solution's strength to conduct electricity.

=== Rehydration ===
According to a study paid for by the Gatorade Sports Science Institute, electrolyte drinks containing sodium and potassium salts replenish the body's water and electrolyte concentrations after dehydration caused by exercise, excessive alcohol consumption, diaphoresis / hyperhidrosis (heavy sweating), diarrhea, vomiting, intoxication or starvation; the study says that athletes exercising in extreme conditions (for three or more hours continuously, e.g. a marathon or triathlon) who do not consume electrolytes risk dehydration (or hyponatremia).

A home-made electrolyte drink can be made by using water, sugar and salt in precise proportions. It is important to include glucose (sugar) to utilise the co-transport mechanism of sodium and glucose. Commercial preparations are also available for both human and veterinary use.

Electrolytes are commonly found in fruit juices, sports drinks, milk, nuts, and many fruits and vegetables (whole or in juice form) (e.g., potatoes, avocados).

== Electrochemistry ==
When electrodes are placed in an electrolyte and a voltage is applied, the electrolyte will conduct electricity. Lone electrons normally cannot pass through the electrolyte; instead, a chemical reaction occurs at the cathode, providing electrons to the electrolyte. Another reaction occurs at the anode, consuming electrons from the electrolyte. As a result, a negative charge cloud develops in the electrolyte around the cathode, and a positive charge develops around the anode. The ions in the electrolyte neutralize these charges, enabling the electrons to keep flowing and the reactions to continue.

Electrolytic cell producing chlorine (Cl_{2}) and sodium hydroxide (NaOH) from a solution of common salt

For example, in a solution of ordinary table salt (sodium chloride, NaCl) in water, the cathode reaction will be

2 H_{2}O + 2e^{−} → 2 OH^{−} + H_{2}

and hydrogen gas will bubble up; the anode reaction is

2 NaCl → 2 Na^{+} + Cl_{2} + 2e^{−}

and chlorine gas will be liberated into solution where it reacts with the sodium and hydroxyl ions to produce sodium hypochlorite - household bleach. The positively charged sodium ions Na^{+} will react toward the cathode, neutralizing the negative charge of OH^{−} there, and the negatively charged hydroxide ions OH^{−} will react toward the anode, neutralizing the positive charge of Na^{+} there. Without the ions from the electrolyte, the charges around the electrode would slow down continued electron flow; diffusion of H^{+} and OH^{−} through water to the other electrode takes longer than movement of the much more prevalent salt ions.

Electrolytes dissociate in water because water molecules are dipoles and the dipoles orient in an energetically favorable manner to solvate the ions.

In other systems, the electrode reactions can involve the metals of the electrodes as well as the ions of the electrolyte.

Electrolytic conductors are used in electronic devices where the chemical reaction at a metal-electrolyte interface yields useful effects.

- In batteries, two materials with different electron affinities are used as electrodes; electrons flow from one electrode to the other outside of the battery, while inside the battery the circuit is closed by the electrolyte's ions. Here, the electrode reactions convert chemical energy to electrical energy.
- In some fuel cells, a solid electrolyte or proton conductor connects the plates electrically while keeping the hydrogen and oxygen fuel gases separated.
- In electroplating tanks, the electrolyte simultaneously deposits metal onto the object to be plated, and electrically connects that object in the circuit.
- In operation-hours gauges, two thin columns of mercury are separated by a small electrolyte-filled gap, and, as charge is passed through the device, the metal dissolves on one side and plates out on the other, causing the visible gap to slowly move along.
- In electrolytic capacitors the chemical effect is used to produce an extremely thin dielectric or insulating coating, while the electrolyte layer behaves as one capacitor plate.
- In some hygrometers the humidity of air is sensed by measuring the conductivity of a nearly dry electrolyte.
- Hot, softened glass is an electrolytic conductor, and some glass manufacturers keep the glass molten by passing a large current through it.

== Solid electrolytes ==
Solid electrolytes can be mostly divided into four groups described below.

=== Gel electrolytes ===
Gel electrolytes – closely resemble liquid electrolytes. In essence, they are liquids in a flexible lattice framework. Various additives are often applied to increase the conductivity of such systems.

=== Ceramic electrolytes ===
Solid ceramic electrolytes – ions migrate through the ceramic phase by means of vacancies or interstitials within the lattice. There are also glassy-ceramic electrolytes.

=== Polymer electrolytes ===
Dry polymer electrolytes differ from liquid and gel electrolytes in that salt is dissolved directly into the solid medium. Usually it is a relatively high-dielectric constant polymer (PEO, PMMA, PAN, polyphosphazenes, siloxanes, etc.) and a salt with low lattice energy. In order to increase the mechanical strength and conductivity of such electrolytes, very often composites are made, and inert ceramic phase is introduced. There are two major classes of such electrolytes: polymer-in-ceramic, and ceramic-in-polymer.

=== Organic plastic electrolytes ===
Organic ionic plastic crystals – are a type organic salts exhibiting mesophases (i.e. a state of matter intermediate between liquid and solid), in which mobile ions are orientationally or rotationally disordered while their centers are located at the ordered sites in the crystal structure. They have various forms of disorder due to one or more solid–solid phase transitions below the melting point and have therefore plastic properties and good mechanical flexibility as well as an improved electrode-electrolyte interfacial contact. In particular, protic organic ionic plastic crystals (POIPCs), which are solid protic organic salts formed by proton transfer from a Brønsted acid to a Brønsted base and in essence are protic ionic liquids in the molten state, have found to be promising solid-state proton conductors for fuel cells. Examples include 1,2,4-triazolium perfluorobutanesulfonate and imidazolium methanesulfonate.

=== Inert Salts ===
As the name implies, inert salts are ionic compounds that exhibit negligible interactions with the species involved in a chemical reaction. Their principal role is to control and maintain a nearly constant ionic strength. Since ionic strength affects the activity coefficients of dissolved ions, changes in ionic strength will influence both chemical equilibria and reaction kinetics through their effect on the activity coefficients of ions.

Commonly used inert salts include NaClO₄ (sodium perchlorate), KNO₃ (potassium nitrate), and CF₃SO₃Na (sodium triflate). The properties of the anion are particularly important because anions can act as Lewis bases and coordinate to metal ions, which are Lewis acids. For this reason, weakly coordinating anions such as perchlorate and triflate are often preferred when minimal interaction with the metal centre is desired.

Inert salts are also used in salt bridges in electrochemical cells. In this application, the key consideration is the ionic mobility of the constituent ions. Ideally, the cation and anion have similar mobilities, thereby minimising liquid junction potentials. The most commonly used salt bridge electrolyte is KCl (potassium chloride) because K⁺ and Cl⁻ possess nearly equal ionic mobilities. When either potassium or chloride ions interfere with the system under investigation, NH₄NO₃ (ammonium nitrate) is often used as an alternative.

== See also ==
- Electrolyte imbalance
- Electrochemical machining
- Elektrolytdatenbank Regensburg
- ITIES (interface between two immiscible electrolyte solutions)
- Salt bridge
- VTPR
