= Abbott Laboratories =

American global medical devices and health care products company

Coordinates: 42.30175°N 87.89595°W

- Former Abbott Laboratories logo, still used on consumer drugs and products.
- Type: Public
- Traded as: NYSE: ABT; S&P 100 component; S&P 500 component
- Industry: Health care; Medical devices; Pharmaceutical
- Founded: 1888; 138 years ago (as Abbott Alkaloidal Company) in Ravenswood, Chicago
- Founder: Wallace Calvin Abbott
- Successor: AbbVie
- Headquarters: Abbott Park, Illinois, U.S.
- Area served: Worldwide
- Key people: Robert B. Ford; (chairman & CEO); Phil Boudreau; (EVP & CFO)
- Products: Pharmaceutical drugs; Generic drugs; Medical devices; Diagnostic assays; Dietary supplements; Nutritionals
- Revenue: ▲US$44.3 billion (2025)
- Operating income: ▲US$8.05 billion (2025)
- Net income: ▼US$6.52 billion (2025)
- Total assets: ▲US$86.7 billion (2025)
- Total equity: ▲US$52.1 billion (2025)
- Number of employees: c. 115,000 (2025)
- Website: abbott.com

Abbott Laboratories, commonly known as Abbott, is an American multinational medical devices and health care company founded in Chicago with headquarters in Abbott Park, Illinois. The company produces pharmaceuticals for sale outside the United States (13% of 2024 revenues), diagnostic products (20% of 2024 revenues), nutritional products (22% of 2024 revenues), and medical devices (45% of 2024 revenues).

Abbott operates in over 160 countries and sources from at least 62 suppliers worldwide. Abbott's products include Pedialyte, Similac, BinaxNOW, Ensure, Glucerna, ZonePerfect, FreeStyle Libre, i-STAT and MitraClip.

The company is ranked 107th on the Fortune 500 and 144th on the Forbes Global 2000.

== History ==
=== Foundation and early history ===
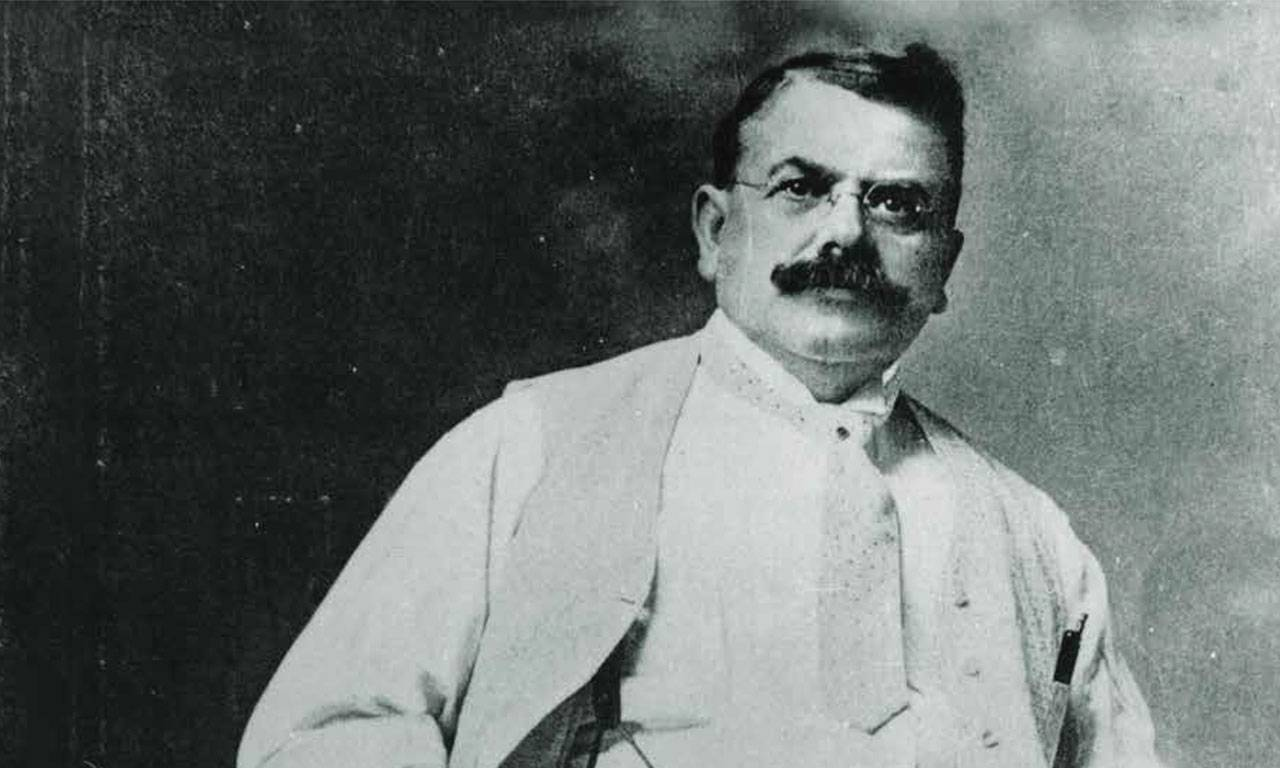
Dr. Wallace C. Abbott

In 1888 at the age of 30, Wallace Abbott (1857–1921), an 1885 graduate of the University of Michigan, founded the Abbott Alkaloidal Company in Ravenswood, Chicago. At the time, he was a practising physician and owned a drug store. His innovation was formulating the active part of alkaloid medicinal plants—morphine, quinine, strychnine and codeine—as tiny "dosimetric granules", producing more consistent and effective dosages for patients than the liquid preparations previously used, which deteriorated over time. In 1922, the company moved from Ravenswood to North Chicago, Illinois.

=== International expansion ===
Abbott's first international affiliate was in London in 1907; the company later added an affiliate in Montreal, Canada. Abbott India Ltd was originally incorporated on August 22, 1944, as Boots Pure Drug Company (India) Ltd. The company name was changed to The Boots Company (India) Ltd on November 1, 1971, and to Boots Pharmaceuticals Ltd on January 1, 1991. On October 31, 1995, the name was changed to Knoll Pharmaceuticals Ltd and on July 1, 2002, to its present name Abbott India Ltd. Abbott started operations in Pakistan as a marketing affiliate in 1948; the company has steadily expanded to comprise a work force of over 1500 employees. Currently, two manufacturing facilities at Landhi and Korangi in Karachi continue to produce pharmaceutical products.

In 1962, Abbott entered into a joint venture with Dainippon Pharmaceutical Co., Ltd., of Osaka, Japan, to manufacture radio-pharmaceuticals. In 1964, it merged with Ross Laboratories, making Ross a wholly owned subsidiary of Abbott, and Richard Ross gained a seat on Abbott's board of directors until his retirement in 1983. The acquisition of Ross brought Similac under the Abbott umbrella. In the years following the acquisition, Pedialyte and Ensure were introduced as nutritional products by Ross Laboratories while under Abbott's leadership.

In 1965, Abbott's expansion in Europe continued with offices in Italy and France. According to Harvard professor Lester Grinspoon and Peter Hedblom, "In 1966 Abbott Laboratories sold the equivalent of two million doses of methamphetamine in powder form to a Long Island criminal dealer".

In 1985, Abbott partnered with Taisho Pharmaceutical for the international rights to clarithromycin, a second-generation macrolide antibiotic, and gained FDA approval for the drug under the brand name Biaxin in October 1991. Generic drug versions were approved in Europe in 2004 and in the US in mid-2005, and has been added to the World Health Organization's List of Essential Medicines.

=== 2001–2010 ===
In 2001, the company acquired Knoll, the pharmaceutical division of BASF, for $6.9 billion. In 2002, it divested the Selsun Blue brand to Chattem. Later in 2002, it sold Clear Eyes and Murine brands to Prestige Brands. In 2004, Abbott completed the corporate spin-off of Hospira, its hospital products division. It was acquired by Pfizer in 2015. In 2004, it acquired TheraSense, a diabetes-care company, which it merged with its MediSense division to become Abbott Diabetes Care. In 2006, Abbott assisted Boston Scientific in its purchase of Guidant Corporation purchasing the vascular device division of Guidant.

In 2007, Abbott acquired Kos Pharmaceuticals for $3.7 billion in cash. At the time of acquisition Kos marketed Niaspan (extended release niacin), and Advicor (niacin/lovastatin). In 2007, the company was to sell two diagnostics divisions to General Electric, but the parties did not agree on the terms of the acquisition. On 8 September 2007, the company sold the UK manufacturing plant at Queenborough to UK manufacturer Aesica Pharmaceuticals. Abbott's Ross Products was renamed Abbott Nutrition in 2007.

In 2009, Abbott acquired Advanced Medical Optics of Santa Ana, California, selling it to Johnson & Johnson in 2017. In 2009, Abbott opened a satellite research and development facility at Research Park, University of Illinois at Urbana-Champaign.

In February 2010, Abbott acquired the pharmaceuticals unit of Solvay S.A. for US$6.2 billion (€4.5 billion), gaining many additional pharmaceutical products and an increased presence in emerging markets.

In 2010, the company acquired Hollywood, Florida-based laboratory information management system company STARLIMS for $123 million, $14 per share. That year Abbott said it would buy Piramal Group of India's large generic drugs unit for $3.72 billion.

=== 2013–present ===
Effective January 1, 2013, the company completed the corporate spin-off of AbbVie. Abbott Nutrition, whose products include Similac, Pedialyte, Glucerna, and Ensure, also retained the Abbott name. In preparation for the reorganization, Abbott cut 550 staff members.

In May 2014, it was announced that Abbott would acquire the holding company Kalo Pharma Internacional S.L. for $2.9 billion in order to secure the 73% it held of Chilean pharmaceutical company, CFR Pharmaceuticals, which the company said would more than double its branded generic drug portfolio. In December 2014, the company acquired Russian pharmaceutical manufacturer Veropharm (Voronezh) in a deal worth $410 million, which included three manufacturing facilities. Abbott, which already employed 1,400 people in Russia, said it planned to set up a manufacturing presence in the country when the deal closed.

In September 2015, the company acquired Tendyne Holdings, a private medical device company focused on developing minimally invasive mitral valve replacement therapies, for $250 million.

In September 2017, the FDA approved Abbott's FreeStyle Libre glucose monitoring system, which reads glucose levels through a self-applied sensor without finger pricks. In October 2017, the company acquired Alere for $5.8 billion. In January 2017, Abbott announced it would acquire St. Jude Medical for $25 billion in stock. With the acquisition of Alere, the company also obtained the subsidiary Arriva Medical, which at one point was the largest mail-order diabetic supplier. Arriva Medical closed facilities in December 2017.

As of August 2018, the company was among the top five companies for branded generic drugs in Russia. In November 2018, Abbott received United States FDA clearance for FreeStyle LibreLink, a glucose reader smartphone app.

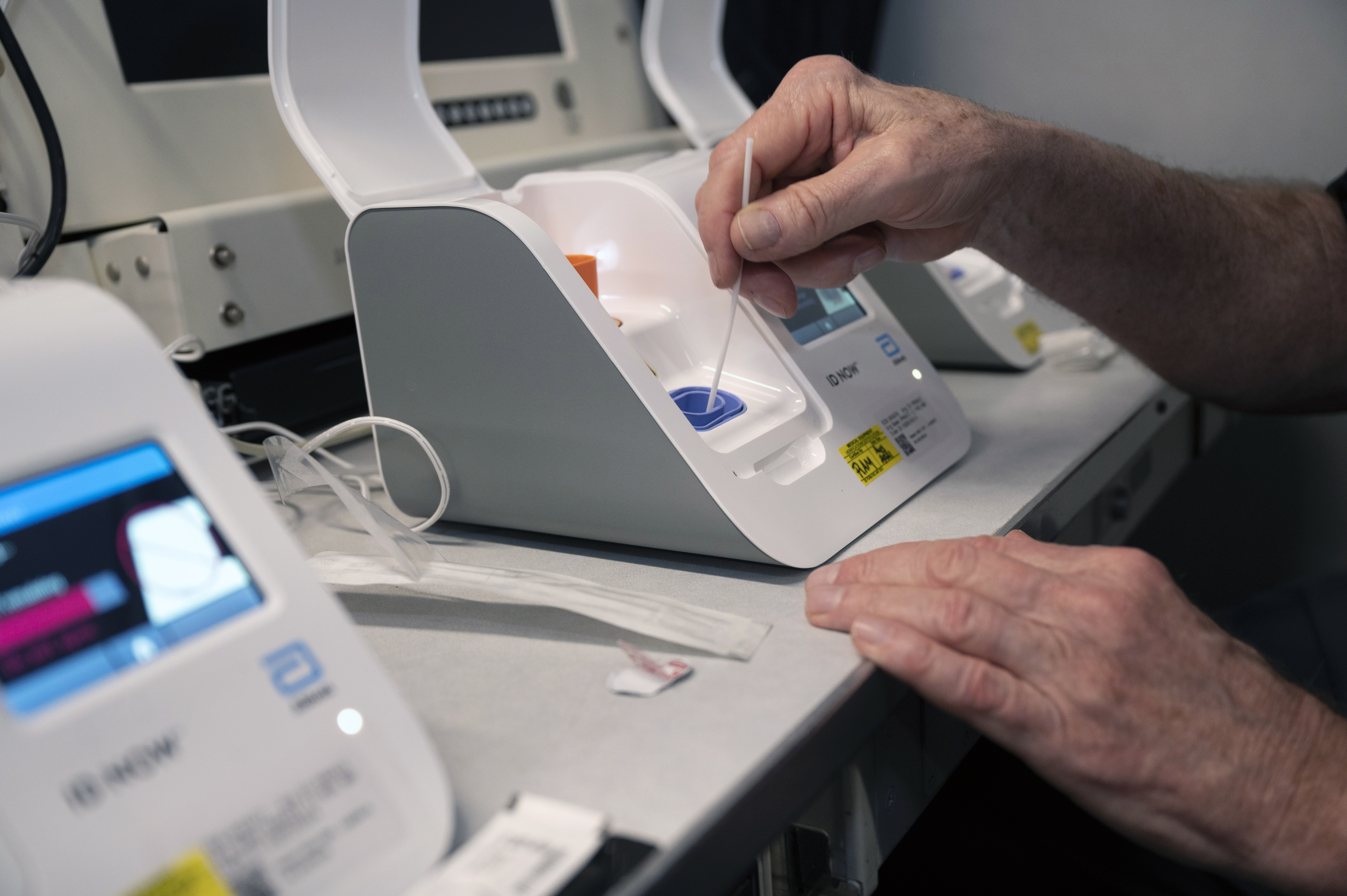
Nucleic acid testing for COVID-19 conducted using an Abbott Laboratories ID Now device

In January 2019, the company acquired Cephea Valve Technologies, which is developing a less-invasive replacement heart valve for people with mitral valve disease.

In January 2020, the Tendyne Mitral Valve became the world's first commercially available solution for Mitral Valve Replacement Technology; with CE Mark for the device, it is possible to implant it in Europe outside of a clinical setting.

In March 2020, Abbott received emergency use authorization (EUA) from the US FDA for a SARS-CoV-2 test during the COVID-19 pandemic. The tester is small (comparable to a small toaster), and produces results within 13 minutes. Detroit received these tests on April 1, 2020. Also in March, the firm received EUA for a molecular COVID-19 test that runs on its m2000 RealTime lab-based platform. In April 2020, itt received EUA from the FDA for its third COVID-19 test, an antibody test that helps detect the IgG antibody to SARS-CoV-2 using the company's ARCHITECT laboratory instruments. In May 2020, it received EUA from the FDA for another lab-based COVID-19 antibody test that helps detect the IgG antibody to SARS-CoV-2 using the company's Alinity i system. Also in May, it received EUA from the FDA for a molecular COVID-19 test for use on the company's Alinity molecular laboratory instrument.

In August 2020, Abbott received EUA from the FDA for its credit-card-sized $5, 15-minute, portable COVID-19 antigen test, BinaxNOW, compatible with the NAVICA mobile app. In October 2020, Abbott received EUA from the FDA for its lab-based COVID-19 IgM antibody blood test. In December 2020, its rapid (20') antigen BinaxNOW COVID-19 test received EUA from the FDA for home use. Forbes reported in January 2021 that the firm had delivered more than 400 million COVID-19 tests, 300 million in the fourth quarter of 2020.

In September 2021, Abbott acquired Walk Vascular, LLC. In January 2022, Abbott introduced Lingo, a line of consumer biowearable sensors that collects a range of biological readings to optimize exercise and nutrition regimens. Following the 2022 Russian invasion of Ukraine, Abbott Laboratories continued its business operations in Russia while suspending non-essential activities such as new investments and advertising. Research from Yale School of Management evaluating corporate responses to the invasion placed Abbott in the "Buying Time" category with a "Grade D" rating, indicating that it postponed future investments and marketing while continuing substantive business in Russia. In May 2022, Abbott received 510(k) clearance from the FDA for FreeStyle Libre 3, the latest version of its continuous glucose monitor. In August 2022, Abbott received FDA approval for Proclaim Plus, a multi-use spinal cord stimulation system designed to target chronic pain. The Proclaim Plus system is capable of treating six independent pain sites and has a recharge-free battery life of up to 10 years. In October 2022, Abbott received EUA from the FDA for its real-time PCR test Alinity m MPXV; this marks the first FDA emergency authorization for commercial monkeypox testing.

In April 2023, the company acquired Cardiovascular Systems, developer of an atherectomy system, which is used in treating peripheral and coronary artery disease, for $851 million. On July 5, 2023, Abbott received approval from the FDA for its leadless pacemaker system Aveir DR. In September 2023, the company acquired Bigfoot Biomedical, a developer of smart insulin management systems for people with diabetes.

In November 2025, Abbott announced an agreement to acquire Exact Sciences Corp. in a deal worth roughly $21 billion.

=== Acquisition history ===
Abbott Laboratories Acquisitions
- Abbott Laboratories (Est. 1885, Abbott Alkaloidal Company)
  - Ross Laboratories (Acq 1964)
  - SmithKline Beecham (Acq 1982, later sold)
  - Knoll (Acq 2001)
  - Selsun Blue (Sold to Chattem 2002)
  - Murine (Sold to Prestige Brands 2002)
  - Clear Eyes (Sold to Prestige Brands 2002)
  - i-STAT (Acq 2004)
  - TheraSense (Acq 2004)
  - Guidant (vascular device division) (Acq 2006)
    - IntraLase Corp (Acq 2007)
  - Advanced Medical Optics (Acq 2009)
  - Solvay Pharmaceuticals (Acq 2010)
  - STARLIMS (Acq 2010, sold 2021)
    - Lab Data Management Ltd (Acq 2008)
  - IDEV Technologies (Acq 2013)
  - OptiMedica Corporation (Acq 2013)
  - Veropharm (Acq 2014)
  - Topera, Inc (Acq 2014)
  - Kalo Pharma Internacional S.L. (Acq 2014)
    - CFR Pharmaceuticals
  - Tendyne Holdings Inc. (Acq 2015)
  - Alere (Acq 2016)
    - Epocal, Inc. (Acq 2013)
    - Arriva Medical (Acq 2012)
  - St. Jude Medical (Est 1976, Acq 2016)
    - Pacesetter, Inc. (Acq 1994)
    - Daig Corporation (Acq 1996)
    - Heart Valve Company (Acq 1996)
    - Biocor Industria (Acq 1996)
    - Ventritex (Acq 1997)
    - Tyco International (Angio-Seal division) (Acq 1999)
    - Endocardial Solutions (Acq 2005)
    - Advanced Neuromodulation Systems (Acq 2005)
    - MediGuide (Acq 2008)
    - AGA Medical (Acq 2010)
    - LightLab Imaging (Acq 2010)
    - Nanostim Inc (Acq 2013)
    - Endosense (Acq 2013)
    - CardioMEMS Inc. (Acq 2014)
    - Spinal Modulation (Acq 2015)
    - Thoratec Corporation (Acq 2015)
      - Apica Cardiovascular Limited (Acq 2014)
      - Levitronix (Medical division) (Acq 2011)
      - Getinge Group (Heat pump technology division) (Acq 2014)
      - Thermo Cardiosystems (Acq 2010)
  - Cephea Valve Technologies, Inc. (Acq 2019)
  - Walk Vascular, LLC (Acq 2021)
  - Cardiovascular Systems, Inc. (Acq 2023)
  - Bigfoot Biomedical (Acq 2023)
  - Exact Sciences Corporation (Acq 2026)

== Financials ==
Year	Revenue in million US$	Net income in million US$	Total assets in million US$	Price per share in US$	Employees
2005	22,338	3,372	29,141	17.37	
2006	22,476	1,717	36,178	17.46	
2007	25,914	3,606	39,714	21.34	
2008	29,528	4,881	42,419	21.89	
2009	30,765	5,746	52,582	19.51	
2010	35,167	4,626	60,574	20.75	
2011	21,407	4,728	60,277	21.26	
2012	19,050	5,963	67,235	26.57	
2013	19,657	2,576	42,953	31.90	69,000
2014	20,247	2,284	41,207	37.39	77,000
2015	20,405	4,423	41,247	43.16	74,000
2016	20,998	1,400	52,666	38.65	75,000
2017	27,390	477	76,250	47.50	99,000
2018	30,578	2,368	67,173	69.50	103,000
2019	31,904	3,687	67,887	86.86	107,000
2020	34,608	4,495	72,548	109.49	109,000
2021	43,075	7,071	75,196	140.74	113,000
2022	43,653	6,905	74,438		115,000
2023	40,109	5,701	73,214		114,000
2024	41,950	13,351	81,414		114,000
2025	44,328	6,520	86,713		115,000

== Operations ==
=== Organization ===
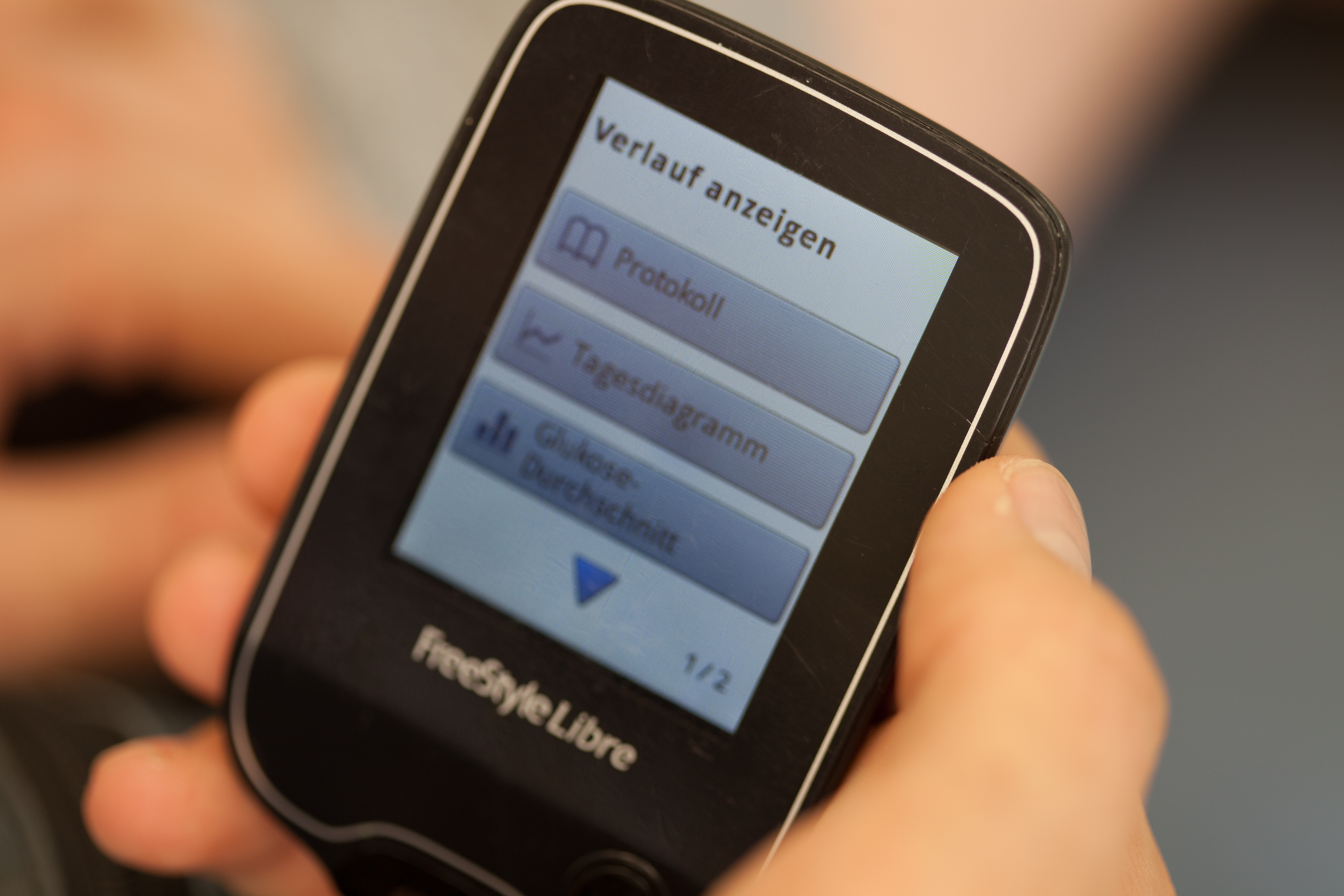
Abbott's FreeStyle libre

Abbott's core businesses focus on diagnostics, medical devices, branded generic medicines and nutritional products, which have been supplemented through acquisitions.

The firm's divisions are:

- Nutrition: Pediatric nutrition (e.g., Similac, Isomil, and Gain), Adult Nutrition (e.g., Ensure and ZonePerfect) and special dietary needs (e.g., Glucerna and Juven)
- Diagnostics: core lab, molecular, point of care, rapid diagnostics and Informatics
- Medical devices: rhythm management, electrophysiology, heart failure, structural heart, neuromodulation, diabetes care
- Established Pharmaceuticals: branded generic drugs sold exclusively in developing markets

=== Management ===
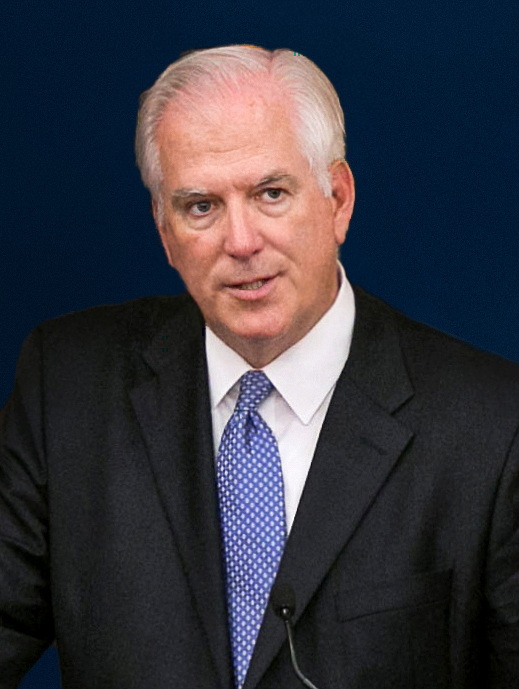
Miles D. White

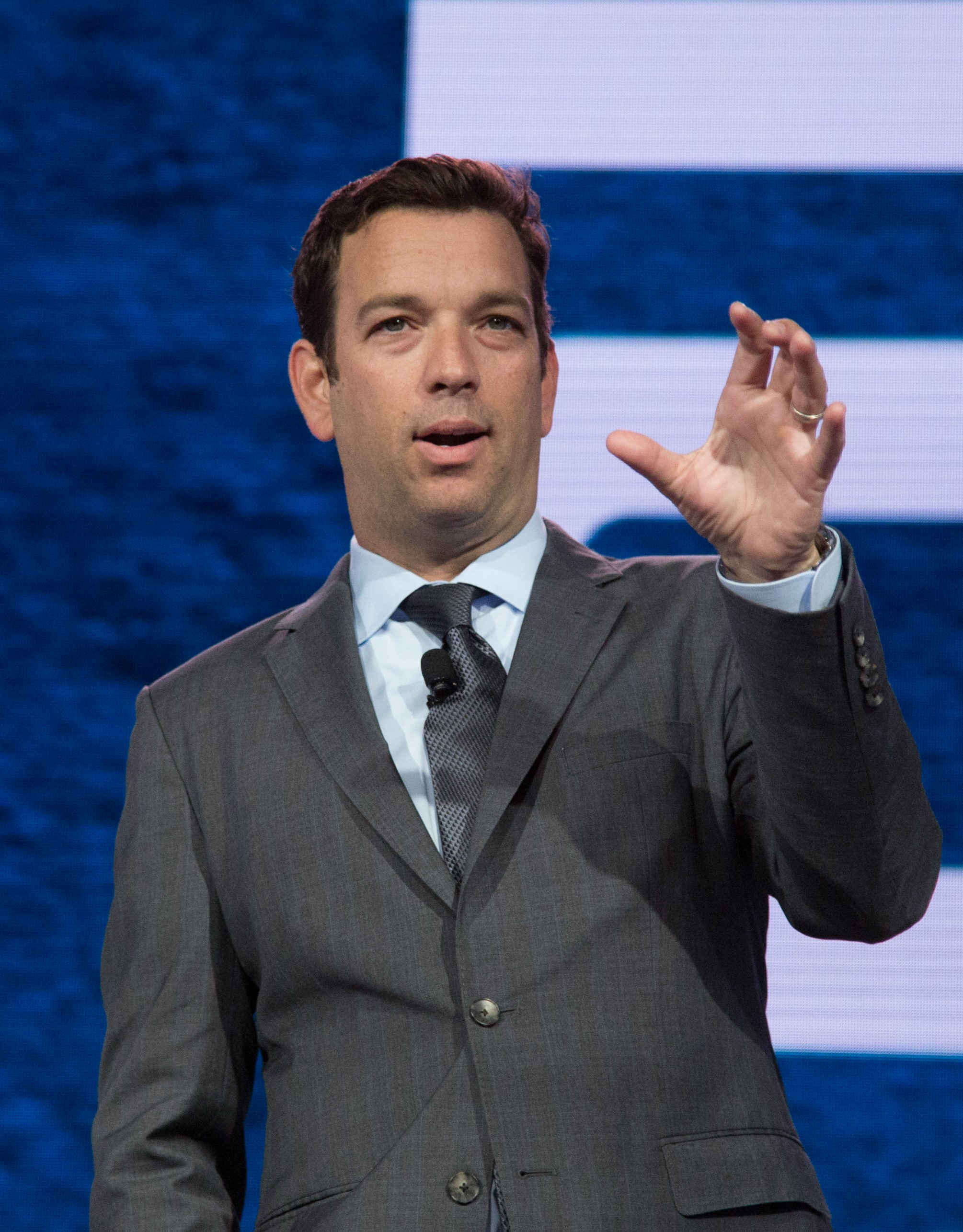
Robert B. Ford

Miles D. White joined the company in 1984, holding positions including senior vice president of diagnostic operations, executive vice president, executive chairman, and CEO. In 1996, Robert B. Ford joined Abbott, holding various positions including executive vice president of the company's medical device business.

In November 2019, White announced that he was stepping down as CEO after 21 years. In March 2020, Robert B. Ford took over as president and CEO, and later chairman.

== Recognition ==
- Named one of its Top 50 World's Most Admired Companies in 2021 by Fortune.
- Named among the Blue ribbon companies in 2021 by Fortune.
- Named to the Change the World list in 2020 by Fortune.
- Ranked #10 on Most Innovative Companies in Sports for Libre Sense by Fast Company.
- Received an Honorable Mention for the World Changing Ideas Awards by Fast Company in 2022.
- The Galien Foundation named Abbott's FreeStyle Libre as Best Medical Technology within the last 50 years (1970–2020).
- The company has been listed on the Seramount/Working Mother's "100 Best Companies" list for 21 years in a row, named a top company for executive women by Seramount.
- Included on Science magazine's Top 20 Employers list.
- Recognized as a top company by DiversityInc for diversity within the company for 19 consecutive years (2004–2022).
- Included on the Dow Jones Sustainability Index for 18 consecutive years.

== Products ==
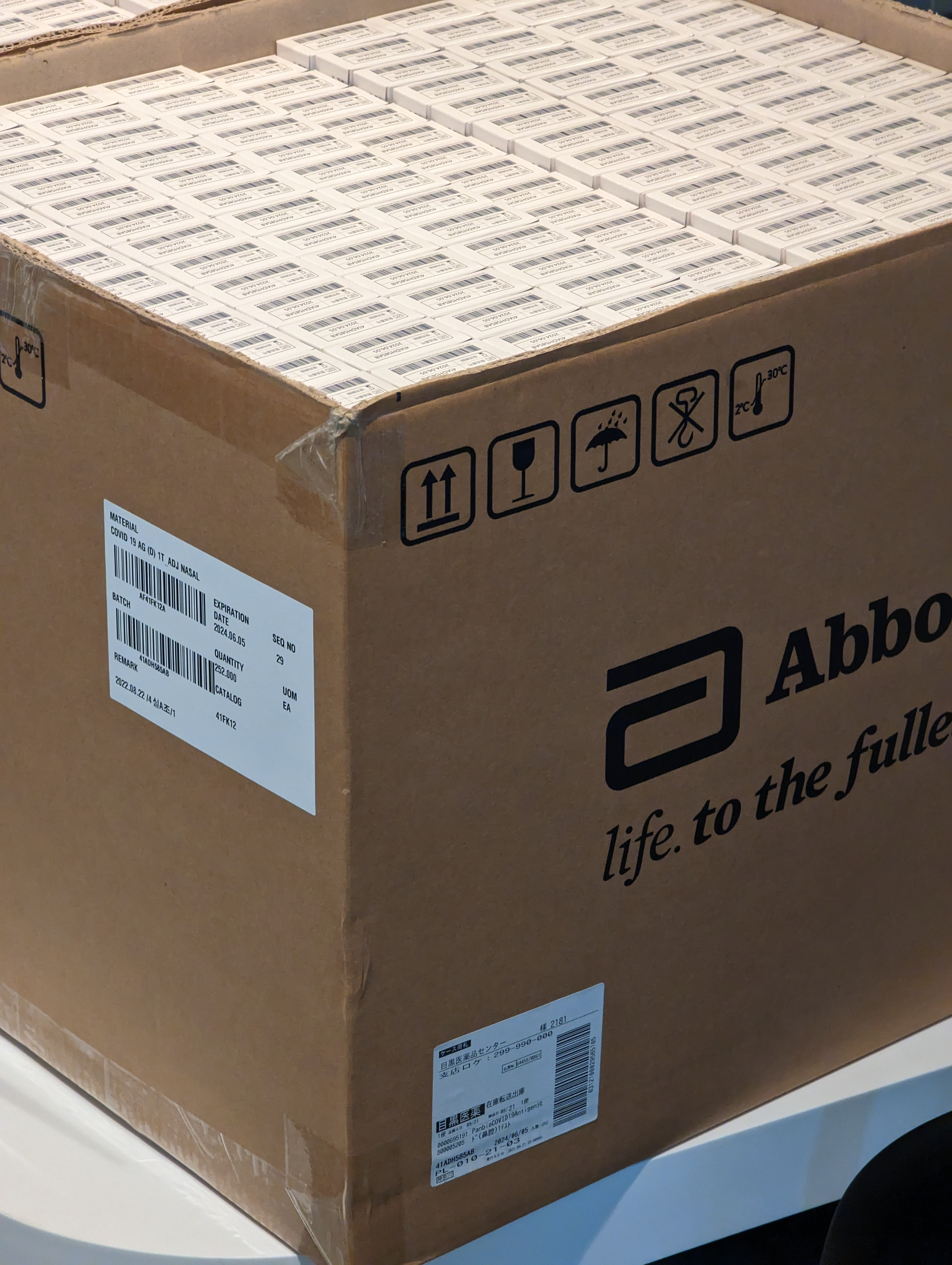
Box of Abbott products

=== Nutrition ===
Pediatric nutrition products manufactured by Abbott Laboratories include:

- Similac
- Similac Gain
- Similac GainPlus
- Similac GainSchool
- Similac Neosure
- Similac Essencia
- Similac Tummicare HW
- Isomil
- Pedialyte
- PediaSure
- PediaSure Plus
- PediaSure Plus 10+

Adult nutrition products manufactured by Abbott Laboratories include:

- Ensure
- Ensure Gold
- Glucerna (Ensure Diabetes Care in India)
- Juven
- ZonePerfect

=== Diagnostics ===
Diagnostics products manufactured by Abbott include:

- i-STAT (While intended for a human audience, the point of care analyzers also demonstrate utility for the veterinary profession and are marketed by Abaxis.)
- Alinity
- Architect
- IDNOW
- Panbio
- Assert-IQ
- BinaxNOW

=== Medical devices ===
Continuous glucose monitors:

- FreeStyle Libre
- FreeStyle Libre 2 Sensor
- FreeStyle Libre 3 Sensor

Cardiovascular devices manufactured by Abbott Laboratories include:

- MitraClip
- Confirm Rx
- Amplatzer Piccolo Occluder
- Heartmate
- Xience
- CARDIOMEMS
- Gallant ICD
- CentriMag
- Aveir DR (Note: pacemaker, received FDA approval on July 5, 2023)

Neuromodulation devices manufactured by Abbott Laboratories include:

- BurstDR Technology
- FlexBurst360 Technology
- Proclaim DRG Neurostimulation System
- Infinity Deep Brain Stimulation System
- Proclaim XR Recharge-Free Spinal Cord Stimulator
- NT2000IX Radiofrequency Generator
- Proclaim Elite Recharge-Free SCS System
- Prodigy MRI SCS System

== Litigation and controversies ==
=== Use of double Irish arrangement and single malt tax to reduce taxation ===
Before it was abolished, Abbott allegedly took advantage of the double Irish arrangement tax structure, a then-legal but controversial Irish taxation tool used by US multinationals to reduce US corporate taxes on non-U.S profits. Abbott's Irish holding company, the Bermuda-resident Abbott Laboratories Vascular Enterprises (ALVE), employed no staff in 2017, but was responsible for distributing Abbot's products and licensing its technology worldwide. ALVE was incorporated in 2003 and had a pre-tax profit of €2 billion in 2016 and 2017 on revenues of €5.2 billion; no taxation was paid on these profits. ALVE had never filed accounts in Ireland since 2003 as it was structured as an unlimited liability company (ULC); however, new EU accounts directives required ALVE to file Irish accounts in 2018. These accounts listed ALVE's registered office as the address of Ireland's largest tax-law firm, Matheson, who have been identified with Double Irish tax structures for Microsoft and Google.

In September 2021, the Irish Times reported that Abbott was using the Single malt tax structure to shield profits on its COVID-19 testing kits.

=== Leuprorelin ===
In October 2001, the US Department of Justice, states attorneys general, and TAP Pharmaceutical Products, a subsidiary of Abbott Laboratories, settled criminal and civil charges against TAP related to federal and state Medicare fraud and illegal marketing of the drug leuprorelin. TAP paid a total of $875 million, a record high pharmaceutical settlement. This comprised $290 million for violating the Prescription Drug Marketing Act, $559.5 million to settle federal fraud charges for overcharging Medicare, and $25.5 million reimbursement to 50 states and Washington, D.C., for filing false claims with the states' Medicaid programs. The case arose under the False Claims Act with claims filed by Douglas Durand, a former TAP vice president of sales, and Joseph Gerstein, a doctor at Tufts University's HMO practice. Durand, Gerstein, and Tufts shared $95 million of the settlement.

There have since been various suits concerning leuprorelin use, none successful. These lawsuits have focused on either the over-prescription of the drug or the lack of warnings about its potential side effects. Between 2010 and 2013, the FDA updated the Lupron drug label to include new safety information on the risk of thromboembolism, loss of bone density and convulsions. The FDA then said that the benefits of leuprorelin outweighed its risks when used according to its approved labeling. From 2017 the FDA evaluated leuprorelin's connection to pain and discomfort in musculoskeletal and connective tissue.

=== Humira ===
In March 2003, British company Cambridge Antibody Technology (CAT) stated its wish to "initiate discussions regarding the applicability of the royalty offset provisions for Humira" (Adalimumab) with Abbott Laboratories in the High Court of London. In December 2004, the judgment ruled for CAT.

Abbott was required to pay CAT US$255 million in lieu of royalties the MRC, the Scripps Research Institute and Stratagene would have received on sales of Humira after December 2004. Some of this sum was to be passed to its partners in development, including US$191 million for the UK Medical Research Council (MRC), plus a further $7.5 million over five years from 2006 providing that Humira remained on the market.

=== Operation Headwaters ===
In October 2003, Abbott Laboratories and two of its units agreed to pay a total of $600 million in the first combined civil settlement and criminal conviction for offering kickbacks to agents of "Operation Headwaters", an undercover investigation by the FBI.

=== Depakote ===
On 2 October 2012, the company was charged with a $500 million fine and $198.5 million forfeiture for illegal marketing of Depakote for uses not approved by the FDA. The court also sentenced Abbott to a five-year term of probation and court supervision. Shareholders then brought derivative suits against the company directors for breach of fiduciary duty. Following Abbott's spinoff of its research-based pharmaceuticals business, it no longer owns the commercial rights and associated responsibilities for Humira and Depakote.

=== Glucose monitors ===
In 2021, two of Abbott Laboratories' subsidiaries, Arriva Medical LLC and Alere Inc, had to pay $160m to resolve claims that it had fraudulently billed Medicare for glucose monitors. The US Department of Justice said that Arriva used free glucose monitors to induce patients to order more consumable supplies, then took kickbacks on the increased sales. The company was also accused of charging Medicare for glucose monitors given to patients who were ineligible, or even dead.

=== Plant shutdown ===
In February 2022, Abbott recalled baby formulas from the market and shut down its Michigan plant after complaints of illness and death in infants caused by serious bacterial infections. Following Abbotts' meeting the initial requirement of the U.S. Food & Drug Administration, the facility reopened in June 2022.

=== Deep Brain Stimulation device recall ===
In 2023, Abbott recalled its Proclaim and Infinity IPGs due to complaints from patients who could not exit MRI mode. The use of the affected IPGs may require surgery to remove the device and replace it with a new device.

There have been 186 reported incidents and 73 reported injuries. There have been no reports of death. Noted by Gita Amar, a PR representative for Abbott Laboratories on this issue. "The company has communicated this action to physicians and regulatory bodies. No products need to be returned to the company or replaced."

=== Necrotizing Enterocolitis (NEC) Lawsuit ===
On July 26, 2024, a jury ordered Abbott Laboratories to pay $495 million in the case of Margo Gill vs. Abbott Laboratories, comprising $95 million in compensatory damages and $400 million in punitive damages. The lawsuit alleged that Abbott's infant formula for premature babies increased the risk of necrotizing enterocolitis (NEC), a gastrointestinal disease that can cause intestinal tissue death and can be life-threatening.

== Sponsorship ==
In 2015 Abbott became the title sponsor of the World Marathon Majors.

== See also ==
- List of Illinois companies
- List of largest biomedical companies by market capitalization
- List of pharmaceutical companies
- Clara Abbott
- 2022 United States infant formula shortage
