= Mr. Nanny =

1993 film by Michael Gottlieb

- Theatrical release poster
- Directed by: Michael Gottlieb
- Written by: Michael Gottlieb; Edward Rugoff
- Produced by: Robert Engelman
- Starring: Hulk Hogan; Sherman Hemsley; Austin Pendleton; Robert Gorman; Madeline Zima; Raymond O'Connor; Mother Love; David Johansen
- Cinematography: Peter Stein
- Edited by: Earl Ghaffari; Michael Ripps
- Music by: David Johansen; Brian Koonin
- Distributed by: New Line Cinema
- Release date: October 8, 1993 (United States)
- Running time: 84 minutes
- Country: United States
- Language: English
- Budget: $10 million
- Box office: $4.3 million

Mr. Nanny is a 1993 American family comedy film starring professional wrestler Hulk Hogan. The working title of the film was Rough Stuff, and David Johansen also recorded a song by that name for the film.

Despite the film failing commercially, it is considered a cult classic, particularly among Hulk Hogan fans.

== Plot ==
Sean Armstrong is a former wrestler living in Palm Beach and suffering from wrestler-days' nightmares. Burt Wilson, Sean's friend and former manager, has a bum leg from saving Sean's life and financial difficulties with his personal security business. He persuades Sean to take a bodyguard job for Alex Mason Sr., the head of the tech firm Mason Systems, which is developing an anti-missile system called the Peacefinder Project. The vital information for this project is stored on a microchip. But it is neither the inventor nor the chip Sean has to guard – he is to look after the Mason kids: Alex Jr. and Kate.

Alex and Kate are two mischievous kids who vie for their often-absent father's attention by wreaking havoc in the household with elaborate, rather vicious pranks and booby-traps, with their specialty targets being their nannies. Thinking that he is a new, albeit unusual, replacement, they find a target in Sean. But after one prank too many, Sean finally exerts his authority and not only quiets Alex and Kate down, but also opens their father's eyes to his family problems, as well as bonding with the kids and helping them sort out their own problems.

Mason's chip is coveted by Tommy Thanatos, an unscrupulous and vain criminal. Sean and Burt were once on the receiving end of one of his schemes: he had ordered them to throw a match, and when they had not complied, he attempted to shoot them. However, Burt threw himself in front of Sean, taking the bullet in his right leg; Sean chased Thanatos, who plunged head-first into an empty pool. This accident fractured the top of his skull, forcing the attachment of a steel skullplate and removing the bulk of his proud afro mane.

Thanatos kidnaps Alex Sr. with the help of Frank Olsen, the corrupt security chief of Mason Systems, and demands that he hand over the chip. When Alex Sr. (who stowed the chip in Kate's doll) refuses, Thanatos kidnaps Alex and Kate to force him to comply. Sean is overpowered, and Burt is taken as well, giving Thanatos an unexpected revenge bonus. But Sean tracks down Thanatos and, with the help of his friends, beats the villains. As Thanatos prepares to charge Sean, Alex Sr. and the children activate an improvised electromagnet to launch him into the night sky, leaving only his skullplate.

The movie ends with Sean preparing to take a leave of absence from the Masons. But Alex and Kate intend to have him back much sooner – and Sean falls victim to yet another prank.

== Cast ==
- Terry "Hulk" Hogan as Sean Armstrong
- Sherman Hemsley as Burt Wilson
- Austin Pendleton as Alex Mason Sr.
- Robert Hy Gorman as Alex Mason Jr., Alex's son
- Madeline Zima as Kate Mason, Alex's daughter
- Raymond O'Connor as Frank Olsen
- Mother Love as Corinne
- David Johansen as Tommy Thanatos
- Peter Kent as Wolfgang
- Jen Sung as Kojiro
- Jeff Moldovan as Jocko
- Artie Malesci as Skipper
- Tim Powell as Lieutenant
- Sandy Mielke as Principal
- Darci Osiecky as Teacher
- Kelly Erin as Nanny
- Joshua Santiago as Bully #1
- Danny Fotou as Bully #2
- Afa Anoa'i as himself
- Brutus Beefcake as himself
- George "The Animal" Steele as himself
- Jim “The Anvil” Neidhart as himself (uncredited)
- Kamala as himself (uncredited)
- Angeline-Rose Troy as Student (uncredited)

== Reception ==
=== Box office ===
The film was a box office bomb, grossing just $4.3 million against its $10 million budget.

=== Critical response ===
The film was poorly received by critics. On Rotten Tomatoes it has an approval rating of 6% based on reviews from 16 critics. On Metacritic, the film had an average score of 18 out of 100, based on 13 critics, indicating "overwhelming dislike".

Kevin Thomas of the Los Angeles Times says the premise has potential but that the film is "needlessly crass and lethally heavy-handed" Chris Hicks of the Deseret News calls the film "a silly kiddie flick that retreads territory better covered by Mr. Mom, Home Alone and any number of clones." He calls the film predictable and finds the comic mayhem difficult to recommend for children.
