= Chuck Versus the A-Team =

- Chuck episode
- Sarah and Victoria watch as Chuck fights with Rick
- Episode no.: Season 4 Episode 18
- Directed by: Kevin Mock
- Written by: Phil Klemmer
- Production code: 3X6318
- Original air date: March 14, 2011

Guest appearances
- Isaiah Mustafa as Captain Richard "Rick" Noble; Robin Givens as Director Jane Bentley; Timur Kocak as Necati Acar a.k.a. "The Turk"; Jon Sklaroff as Dragan Pichushkin; Stacy Keibler as Captain Victoria "Vicki" Dunwoody

Episode chronology
← Previous "Chuck Versus the First Bank of Evil"	Next → "Chuck Versus the Muuurder"

"Chuck Versus the A-Team" is the eighteenth episode of the fourth season of Chuck. It aired on March 14, 2011. Chuck Bartowski and Sarah Walker suspect John Casey is carrying out private missions. Chuck fears the CIA's new operatives (Isaiah Mustafa and Stacy Keibler), who have downloaded the Intersect, will render him obsolete. Morgan Grimes settles in with Casey, his new roommate. Devon Woodcomb becomes uncomfortable with Ellie Woodcomb's research.

== Plot ==
Chuck Bartowski and Sarah Walker are becoming bored with their lack of missions, and begin to suspect Casey is carrying out missions without them. Sarah worries that the CIA is replacing them with Casey's extremely efficient team, but Chuck considers himself irreplaceable with the Intersect. Chuck and Sarah break into Casey's apartment and find Stephen J. Bartowski's laptop Intersect. Rick and Vicki appear and try to remove Chuck from the area, but Chuck flashes to defend himself. After a brief fight, Chuck realizes that they are all using the same technique.

Rick and Vicki flash on a surveillance video, learning that Pichushkin is transporting a fully assembled bomb. Against Bentley's reservations, Casey requests that Chuck and Sarah be used as backup for the mission.

When Pichushkin arrives, Rick and Vicki shoot his bodyguards, before he reveals that he is carrying a suitcase nuke and has possession of a remote arming device. As he flees, Sarah and Vicki pursue him, while Chuck joins Casey and Rick to disarm the bomb.

Beckman gives Chuck control of the Intersect program and has the Intersect extracted from Rick and Vicki's brain's.

== Production ==
It was announced on February 25, 2011, that Isaiah Mustafa and Stacy Keibler would reprise their role of the second and third Greta from "Chuck Versus the Suitcase" and "Chuck Versus the Cubic Z", respectively. It was revealed on March 11, 2011, that their actual names would be Captain Rick Noble and Captain Victoria Dunwoody. This episode marked the return of writer Phil Klemmer, a writer from the original staff who departed to write for the series Undercovers.

== Music ==
Songs listed by Alan Sepinwall.

- "Murder Weapon" by Tricky
- "You & Me" by Diamond Rings
- "No Man is an Island" by Losers
- "Ticking Heart" by The One AM Radio

== Reception ==
"Chuck Versus the A-Team" received positive reviews from critics. HitFix writer Alan Sepinwall wrote, "From the perspective of a continuity-obsessed fanboy, I appreciate the return of those old subplots. And it helped that they came in a strong overall episode, one that featured a good character arc for all three original members of Operation Bartowski - not to mention one that brought back the government's ongoing desire to have someone other than Chuck have an Intersect in his head." Hayden Childs of The A.V. Club gave the episode a B−, writing, "The last episode was a fun one, which is at least partly due to the presence of Ray Wise, one of those character actors who elevates material both great and crappy. This one, however, has the guy from the Old Spice commercials. Perhaps he, too, is an excellent actor, but he doesn’t have much to do here besides look blandly arrogant."

Eric Goldman of IGN gave this episode a score of 7 out of 10. Though he enjoyed having clarity about the G.R.E.T.A. program, Goldman was disappointed with the episode's impact writing that Rick and Vicki got "Intersects very quickly, and I think the impact was particularly diminished by the fact that it all seemed to wrap up just as quickly. Wouldn't it have been more interesting to have had these two, and their much more clinical, methodical approach to using the Intersect, stick around for a few episodes, as Chuck has to process what it might mean for his future?"

The episode drew 4.92 million viewers, the second-lowest number in Chuck's history at the time of the episode's airing, after "Chuck Versus Phase Three".
