= Pedialyte =

Oral electrolyte solution

- Product type: Several formulas tailored to different needs and age groups
- Current owner: Abbott Laboratories
- Country: United States
- Introduced: 1964; 62 years ago
- Related brands: EleCare; PediaSure; Similac; Ensure
- Markets: United States; Canada
- Previous owners: Ross Laboratories
- Ambassador: Odell Beckham Jr.
- Tagline: "Hydrate and Feel Better Fast."
- Website: www.pedialyte.com

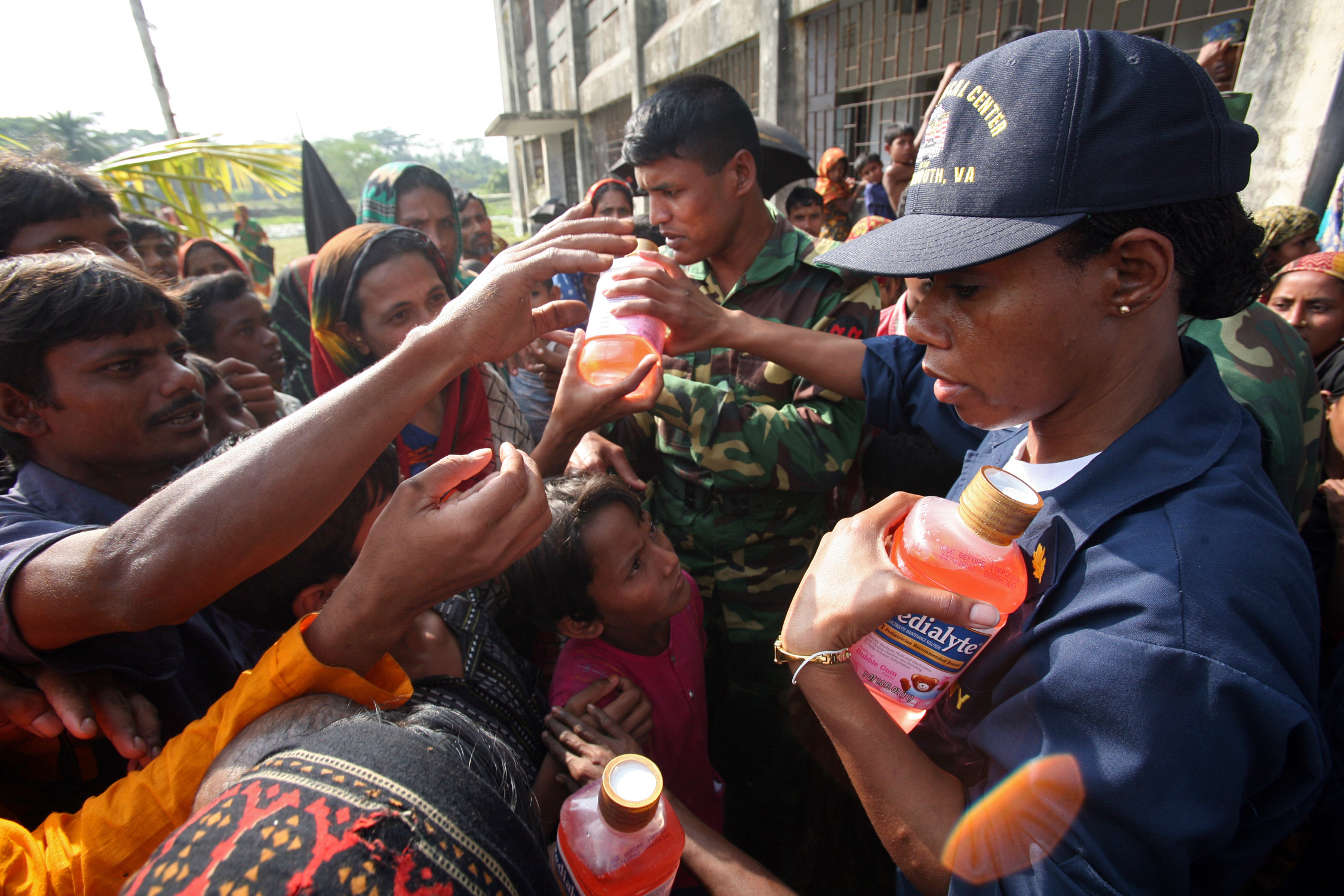
United States Navy personnel distributing Pedialyte to victims of Cyclone Sidr in Bangladesh

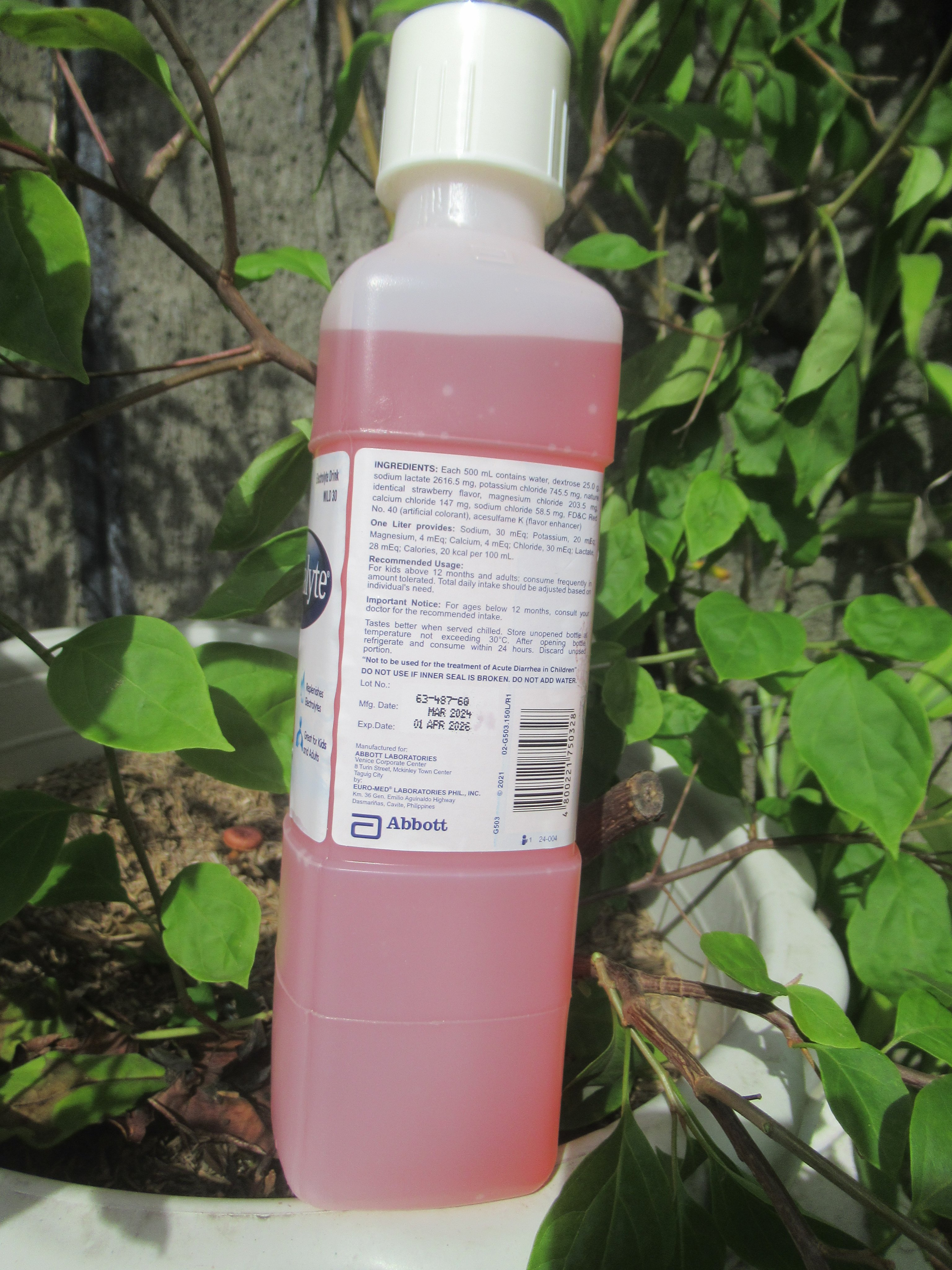
Strawberry flavor

Pedialyte is an oral electrolyte solution manufactured by Abbott Laboratories and marketed for use in children. It was first issued to hospitals in 1966, while non-hospital sales to consumers began in 1969.

== Description ==
Pedialyte is claimed to promote rehydration and electrolyte replacement in ill children.

Pedialyte is lower in sugars than most sports drinks, containing 100 kilocalories per liter compared to approximately 240 in Gatorade. It contains more sodium (1,035 milligrams per liter vs. 465 mg/L in Gatorade) and potassium (780 milligrams per liter vs. 127 mg/L in Gatorade). Pedialyte does not contain sucrose, because this sugar has the potential to make diarrhea worse by drawing water into the intestine, increasing the risk of dehydration. In its flavored formulations, Pedialyte uses the synthetic sweeteners sucralose and acesulfame potassium.

Pedialyte has become a hydration alternative to sports drinks for some athletes.

Pedialyte has become a popular drink for people suffering from hangovers, with one third of its sales coming from adults. There has been a 57% increase in its use by adults since 2012. As a result, Pedialyte has begun a marketing campaign promoting the use of Pedialyte by hungover adults.

Pedialyte is similar to rehydration fluids used by the World Health Organization (WHO) such as "New Oral Rehydration Solution" (N-ORS), that are used during the outbreak of illnesses such as cholera and rotavirus. Similar products include Lytren, NormaLyte, Gastrolyte, Ricelyte, Repalyte, Resol, Cordial, Hydralyte, and Drip Drop.

== See also ==
- Suero Oral
