= CFR Pharmaceuticals =

Chilean pharmaceutical company

CFR Pharmaceuticals S.A
- Company type: Sociedad Anónima
- Traded as: BCS: CFR
- Industry: Pharmaceuticals
- Founded: 1922
- Headquarters: Santiago, Chile
- Key people: Alejandro Weinstein Crenovich, (Chairman); Alejandro Weinstein Manieu, (CEO)
- Products: drugs
- Revenue: ▲US$ 570.8 million (2012)
- Net income: ▼US$ 79.6 million (2012)
- Number of employees: 4,559
- Website: CFR Pharmaceuticals

CFR Pharmaceuticals, now owned by Abbott Laboratories, is a Chilean pharmaceutical company engaged in the development, production, and sale of pharmaceutical drugs in 15 Latin American countries such as Argentina, Bolivia, Chile, Colombia, Costa Rica, Ecuador, Paraguay, Peru, Venezuela and others and in Vietnam in Asia. The company is one of the largest Pharmaceutical companies in Latin America.

== Recalcine division ==
Its Recalcine division offers products in various therapeutic areas, including general medicine, pediatrics, gastroenterology, traumatology, otorhinolaryngology, ENT, obesity, infectious diseases, and nutrition for the treatment of acute and acute-chronic symptoms. This segment serves general practitioners, surgeons, pediatricians, gastroenterologists, orthopedic surgeons, rheumatologists, otorhinolaryngologists, pulmonary physicians, obesity specialists, and dieticians.

== Gynopharm division ==
The company’s Gynopharm division provides a range of therapeutic options, such as oral contraceptives, hormone replacement therapies, antiandrogens, antioxidants, antifungals, and vitamins for women. Its Drugtech division offers antiepileptics, antidepressants, antipsychotics, and antihypertensives for the treatment of diseases in the areas of cardiology, neurology, psychiatry, and urology.

== Complex Injectable division ==
The company’s Complex Injectable division develops injectable products for the infectious diseases, anesthesia, cardiology, and critical care areas. Its Biomedical Sciences division offers products in various therapeutic areas, such as oncology, organ transplant, dialysis, cancer, diabetes, and autoimmune diseases.

== K2 division ==
The company’s K2 division provides self-medicated and personal care products. Its Mediderm division offers dermatology-related treatment products comprising anti-acne products, topical antibiotic therapy, topical corticoid therapy, oral herpes medication, topical immunomodulator medication, antifungals, and hair loss products.

== Abbott Laboratories ==
On 16 May 2014 it was announced that the company would be acquired by Abbott Laboratories for $2.9 billion.
