= Suero Oral =

American electrolyte beverage brand

- Type: Electrolyte beverage
- Manufacturer: Suero Oral Inc.
- Origin: United States
- Introduced: 1999; 26 years ago
- Color: Various Colors
- Flavor: Various Flavors
- Website: suerooralinc.com

In the United States, Suero Oral is a brand name of an electrolyte solution used to re-hydrate after working in heat-intensive environments, athletic activity, to treat pediatric vomiting and diarrhea, and as a hangover remedy. The product is similar in formula to other popular pediatric electrolyte beverages such as Pedialyte.

The name originated as a reference to suero casero, a whey-based home remedy (also known simply as suero) given to children in parts of South and Central America, the Caribbean, and other Spanish speaking areas. These homemade solutions are common to many households and used to combat dehydration caused by illness, work in extreme heat, or by certain diseases.

Oftentimes, in these regions, these homemade solutions are referred to casually as suero casero (homemade serum), or sueros, but this usage has not extended to the United States. In the United States, the product Suero Oral® contains a blend of water with sugars, flavoring agents (e.g. lemon) and salts to provide similar health benefits.

Many variations of electrolyte solutions exist throughout the Spanish-speaking world, and they are often recommended to those traveling to Latin America as a way to avoid dehydration. The United States Peace Corps missions to Latin America often conduct instructional sessions on crafting homemade versions to combat dehydration. Various health aid agencies, as part of their medical relief missions to Latin America, have conducted instructional sessions on crafting homemade liquid electrolyte solutions to counter the effects of dehydration.
