= Forgive or Forget =

American talk show (1998–2000)

- Genre: Talk show
- Directed by: Alex Tyner
- Presented by: Mother Love (1998–2000); Robin Givens (2000)
- Theme music composer: Joel Beckerman; Lloyd Landesman; Alan Zahn
- Country of origin: United States
- Original language: English
- No. of seasons: 2

Production
- Executive producers: April Benimowitz; Stuart Krasnow; Kathryn Seigel Levine
- Producers: April Benimowitz; Derek Che; Michelle Cohen; Deborah Koenig; Risa Saslow; Kathryn Seigel Levine
- Editors: Greg Boas; Kathleen Pearse
- Running time: 45–48 min
- Production companies: Jonathan Goodson Productions; Monet Lane Productions; 20th Television

Original release
- Network: Syndication
- Release: June 8, 1998 – May 26, 2000

Forgive or Forget is an American talk show aired in national syndication premiering for summer trial run on June 8, 1998, before being picked up for a full season, which began on August 31, 1998. The original host of the show was Mother Love, but in January 2000, she was replaced by Robin Givens for the remainder of the second season when the show transitioned to a tabloid talk show format, which was a popular subgenre of the talk show format at the time.

The show presented an invited guest talking about a milestone event from the guest's past in which the guest had wronged, or had been wronged by, a friend or loved one; the guest was on the show to find out if the other person was present and ready to make amends. Forgive or Forget was produced and distributed by 20th Television, now owned by Disney Media Distribution.

== Format ==
Each show consisted of three segments. At the beginning of each segment, a guest told their side of the story to the host. Most often, the guest was someone who had done something to hurt a friend or relative, in which case the guest hoped the other person would offer forgiveness. Sometimes, the guest was the one wronged by someone else, and wanted an apology from the second person. Occasionally, the other person was interviewed during the segment via closed-circuit television, during which time the host usually tried to help the two sides come to a resolution.

Near the end of the segment, the guest was asked to proceed to a large door at the end of the stage. If the other person was willing to forgive or apologize, he or she would be waiting behind the door, and the two would reunite when the door opened. However, if the second person was not willing to make amends, the door would open to reveal only a black curtain on the other side.

After the revelation, Mother Love would counsel the two sides. If the guest had received an "empty door," a taped response from the second person was aired, in which the person explained why he or she would not come to the door. In later episodes, another live interview would be held via closed-circuit television, with all guests participating. Occasionally, this second interview led the offended person to change their mind and come to the door to reunite with the guest.

On several episodes, a guest would be featured who had lost contact with another family member and wished for a reconciliation. If the family member was willing to reunite with the guest (as they usually were), they would be waiting on the other side of the door.

== New host and cancellation ==
Four months into Forgive or Forget’s second season, ratings began to slide after a highly rated first year. Producers decided to revamp the series and replace host Mother Love with actress Robin Givens on January 17, 2000. The new format, which featured a more tabloid talk show style of crudeness, vulgarity and unruly confrontation was structured more in the traditional "chairs, guest, and host" talk-show format, though the previous set was carried over. The new format was not a hit and the show was cancelled in April 2000. The series continued to run original episodes through May 26, 2000, with repeats airing until September 8.

Reruns featuring both hosts aired on the digital subchannel Bounce TV from December 17, 2012, to October 25, 2015.
