= Chuck Versus the First Bank of Evil =

- Chuck episode
- Chuck robs the First Bank of Macau.
- Episode no.: Season 4 Episode 17
- Directed by: Frederick E.O. Toye
- Written by: Henry Alonso Myers; Craig DiGregorio
- Production code: 3X6317
- Original air date: February 28, 2011

Guest appearances
- Lauren Cohan as Vivian McArthur Volkoff; François Chau as Guillermo Chan; Ray Wise as Riley

Episode chronology
← Previous "Chuck Versus the Masquerade"	Next → "Chuck Versus the A-Team"

"Chuck Versus the First Bank of Evil" is the seventeenth episode of the fourth season of Chuck. It originally aired on February 28, 2011. Chuck Bartowski encourages Vivian McArthur (Lauren Cohan) to get in touch with her inner villain for a mission; Morgan Grimes' search for a new roommate has unexpected results.

== Plot ==
Vivian McArthur investigates her father Alexei Volkoff's office at the Volkoff Industries headquarters in Moscow, Russia. After unlocking a secret compartment with the locket her father had given her, Vivian finds a bank account card. General Beckman assigns Chuck Bartowski and Sarah Walker to use Vivian to infiltrate the criminal-funding First Bank of Macau, having learned that Volkoff has left a means for her to enter the bank with the account card.

Beckman reveals that the bank has used the servers to become a black market stock exchange, laundering money for criminals, terrorists, and rogue nations. Beckman agrees to let Vivian see her father in exchange for her help and orders Chuck and Sarah to rob the bank as a diversion.

Beckman later decides that the security risks are too high for Vivian to see her father, and Chuck is forced to apologize to her. Chuck later calls Vivian, who ignores the call and drives away with Riley, wanting to learn the truth about her father.

== Music ==
Songs listed by Alan Sepinwall.

- "El Capitan" by The Steelwells
- "Squealing Pigs" by Admiral Fallow
- "Black Leaf" by The Cave Singers
- "Breeze" by Alex Silverman

== Reception ==
"Chuck Versus the First Bank of Evil" received positive reviews from critics. HitFix writer Alan Sepinwall wrote, "After last week's episode impressively balanced a bunch of different storylines for the large ensemble, 'Chuck vs. the First Bank of Evil' was a more streamlined affair, focusing primarily on Vivan's slow transformation from Vivan McArthur to Vivian Volkoff. Unfortunately, Vivian was probably the least compelling part of last week's episode, and the expanded spotlight tonight didn't have me any more convinced that she's going to be a great villain (even if she's a conflicted one) moving forward... Chuck and Sarah robbing the evil bank as a cover for Vivian while talking about the wedding offered up a parallel of sorts of their fight in the middle of another bank robbery in the first Volkoff episode... The bank robbery was such a blatant riff on 'The Matrix' that I'm surprised they missed the opportunity to have Chuck make a joke about it."

Even Steve Heisler of The A.V. Club gave the episode a B, writing that, though the episode was not disjointed and that the "action, particularly the Matrix homage that sent Sarah flying through the air, was well staged and self-aware enough to let itself go over-the-top", it felt "bloated", and the main plot did not blend well with the episode's subplots. Heisler wrote that the episode "was still one of the better recent Chuck episodes (and even though I'm the guy who gave last week's a D, I don't mean that as faint praise)." Eric Goldman of IGN gave this episode a score of 7.5 out of 10, writing that it "felt like a bit of an off week for Chuck – but I do hope we can now continue gathering momentum with Vivian, as Chuck faces off with his evil sister... I mean, if she is his sister."

The episode drew 5.35 million viewers.
