= ZonePerfect =

American health food company

- Type: Protein; Nutrition bars
- Industry: Health; Wellness; Sports nutrition
- Founded: 1996; 30 years ago
- Founder: Dr. Barry Sears
- Headquarters: Columbus, Ohio, United States
- Area served: Nationwide
- Products: High-protein nutrition bars; shakes
- Owner: Abbott Laboratories
- Number of employees: 115,000 (2024)
- Website: zoneperfect.com at the Wayback Machine (archived 2019-04-04)

ZonePerfect was a manufacturer of health food products located in Columbus, Ohio. The company was founded by Barry Sears in 1996.

They were known for their nutrition bars and shakes, created to comply with the Zone diet. The brand was a part of the Ross Productions Division of Abbott Laboratories, and was commonly available in grocery stores in the United States. Their nutrition bars were available in 15 different flavors, each containing at least 12 grams of protein, while their shakes were available in either vanilla or chocolate, containing 19 grams of protein.

All ZonePerfect meals were based on the ratio 40:30:30—in other words, the food they marketed was 40% carbohydrates, 30% protein, and 30% fat. ZonePerfect frequently sponsored competitive events, such as the San Francisco Marathon. The packaging said they were "All-Natural Nutrition Bars".

On March 20, 2024, ZonePerfect announced the discontinuation of all protein bars marketed under the ZonePerfect brand.
