= Miles D. White =

American businessman (born 1955)

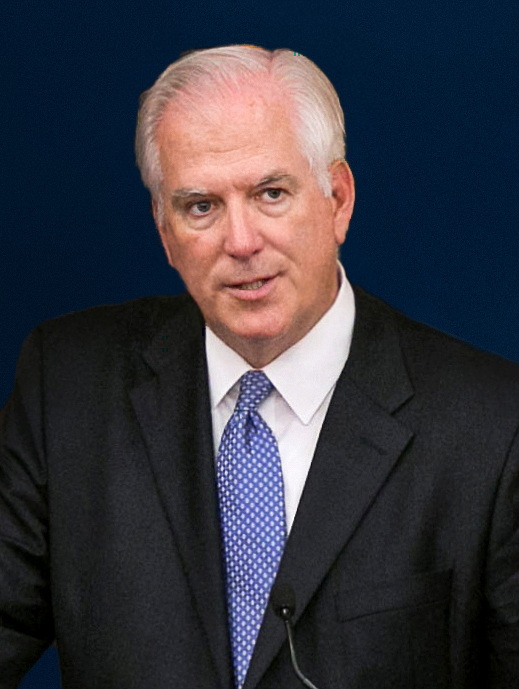
Miles White

Miles D. White (born 1955) is an American businessman. He had a 38-year career with Abbott Laboratories, most prominently being CEO between 1999 and 2020.

== Early life and education ==
Miles White was born in Minneapolis, Minnesota. He went to Culver Military Academy at age 13. He holds two degrees from Stanford University, a bachelor's degree in mechanical engineering and an MBA.

== Career ==
White started his career as a consultant at McKinsey & Co. He joined Abbott in 1984, serving there in management positions including Senior Vice President of Diagnostic Operations and Executive Vice President. He was elected to the board of directors in April 1998, to CEO in 1999, and to chairman of the board in April 1999. As of November 2019, White's tenure is the second longest for a non-founder CEO among the S&P 100. Under his leadership, he has created approximately $200 billion in shareholder value.

White has been praised for the ability to position Abbott to be able to adapt to patient and consumer needs and creating a diverse culture at the company. He has also been praised for increasing the global stature and valuation of Abbott and expanding the company's worldwide sales. He has created two public companies as the CEO of Abbott: AbbVie and Hospira. Hospira was later purchased by Pfizer for $16 billion.

In 2017, White earned $1.9 million in base compensation and over $13.5 million in bonuses, stocks, options, and other compensation. He ranked 72 in a list of highest-paid executives at S&P 500 companies for the 2017 fiscal year.

In November 2019, White announced that he would be stepping down from his role as chief executive officer at Abbott on March 31, 2020, while remaining executive chairman on the company's board. He stepped down from the board of directors in December 2021.

White currently serves on the board of directors of McDonald's and Caterpillar Inc. He is a former chairman of the Federal Reserve Bank of Chicago, the Economic Club of Chicago, and the Pharmaceutical Research and Manufacturers of America.

He is the chairman of the board of trustees of the Culver Educational Foundation and is on the board of trustees of Northwestern University. He was also named a “Life Member” of Northwestern's business school the Kellogg School of Management. White is a fellow of the American Academy of Arts and Sciences and formerly served as chairman of the Field Museum of Natural History board of trustees.

=== Awards and achievements ===
White has been listed in Forbes' list of America's Most Powerful People and its America's Most Innovative Leaders. He was also recognized as one of the world's "30 Best CEOs" by Barron's for 11 consecutive years.
