= Chuck Versus the Muuurder =

- Chuck episode
- Chuck and Casey confront the murder suspects: Josie, Director Bentley, Damien, and Lewis.
- Episode no.: Season 4 Episode 19
- Directed by: Allan Kroeker
- Written by: Alex Katsnelson; Kristin Newman
- Production code: 3X6319
- Original air date: March 21, 2011

Guest appearances
- Robin Givens as Jane Bentley; James Francis Ginty as Lewis; Karissa Vacker as Josie; Mousa Kraish as Damian; David H. Lawrence XVII as Marvin; Stephen Pollak as Brody

Episode chronology
← Previous "Chuck Versus the A-Team"	Next → "Chuck Versus the Family Volkoff"

"Chuck Versus the Muuurder" is the nineteenth episode of the fourth season of Chuck. It originally aired on March 21, 2011. Chuck Bartowski is made the team leader and tasked with finding new Intersect candidates, but must solve a murder mystery when his recruits start turning up dead. Meanwhile, the Buy More and Large Mart staffs engage in mascot battle.

== Plot ==
=== Main plot ===
General Diane Beckman assigns Chuck Bartowski the responsibility of selecting candidates for the Intersect, believing that his unique experience makes him best suited to identify those who think and act like him. Chuck develops a detailed psychological profile and the CIA sends four prospective candidates to the Buy More. These include Lewis, a technical operations specialist with an English accent, Josie, a psychological warfare expert, Damien, a Greek-American agent frequently embedded in terror cells, and Brody, who shares striking similarities with Chuck.

Chuck delegates the candidates’ physical, psychological, and cultural assessments to John Casey, Sarah Walker, and Morgan Grimes, respectively. Eventually, Chuck selects Brody as his preferred candidate. However, before Chuck can inform him, Brody stumbles upon someone planting an explosive near Castle’s entrance. Confronting the individual, Brody is killed.

As Chuck and Director Jane Bentley discover Brody’s body, Chuck begins to question his leadership abilities. Realizing that one of the remaining candidates is the murderer, Chuck orders the surrender of all weapons and plans to review security footage and interrogate everyone. Damien, suspecting racial profiling, tries to leave, only to trigger an explosion. Though injured, he is ruled out as a suspect. Further explosions cut off the power, trapping everyone inside.

Chuck and Sarah interrogate Bentley, suspecting her of holding a grudge from a previous failed mission. However, each candidate has a motive: Josie’s emotional instability due to a breakup, Damien’s resentment over being typecast, and Lewis's jealousy as Chuck’s second choice. Despite the interrogations, the killer remains unidentified until Chuck discovers a bomb under the interrogation seat, narrowly escaping.

With Lewis missing and the group concluding he is the murderer, Chuck and Bentley find Lewis’s body with his throat slit. The remaining suspects, Bentley and Josie, accuse each other until Chuck, recalling evidence of Josie's pregnancy, concludes that Bentley is not the murderer. Whispering to her, Chuck reveals that Damien is the culprit, who faked his injuries to cover his crimes. After a tense standoff, Bentley kills Damien, preventing further destruction.

In the aftermath, Chuck receives commendation from Beckman for his leadership, though it is decided that no new Intersect will be created. However, Chuck learns that Vivian Volkoff hired Damien, signaling that he has a new nemesis.

=== Buy More ===
Morgan learns from Big Mike that the Buy More is doing the same promotion as their competitor Large Mart. To promote the sale, Mike stands outside the store wearing a large "BM" on his chest in the Buy More colors, green and yellow. Suddenly, Large Mart employees drive up in a van and kidnap Mike. The Large Mart employees claim that the kidnapping was in retaliation for Buy More employees kidnapping Kevin Bacon. Morgan confronts Jeff Barnes and Lester Patel, who lead him to the closet where they have kept "Kevin Bacon", a pig revealed to be the Large Mart mascot.

Morgan meets with the Large Mart manager, Marvin (David H. Lawrence XVII), and several other employees to negotiate a trade. Marvin allows Morgan to call Big Mike, proving that he is alive and being fed. Morgan leads Marvin to the closet where Kevin Bacon was being kept, only to find the pig missing.

Morgan questions Jeff and Lester about the location of the pig, but to no avail. They finally reveal that they have hidden the pig in the air ducts, just as Casey finds him in Castle. Later, an explosion sends the piglet flying into Chuck's arms.

Just as Morgan rallies the Buy More staff to rescue Big Mike, the latter walks through the main door, having easily escaped his "nerd" guards. But their victory is short-lived, as Large Mart employees bring the BM costume to the front door and light it on fire. Chuck then enters the Buy More with the pig, quickly deducing everything that's happened.

=== The Orion laptop ===
Ellie Bartowski-Woodcomb continues using the laptop left by her father Stephen J. Bartowski (Orion), having been given the laptop by Bentley in the previous episode. Ellie studies her father's research and praises his intelligence and creativity. Concerned about his wife's obsession, Devon Woodcomb asks if she should be digging through her father's work, to which Ellie simply replies, "What's the worst that can happen?". Devon calls Chuck, and they agree to keep Ellie out of the spy world. Chuck suggests replacing the computer's hard drive with a blank one, which would make Ellie believe it was simply broke.

Meanwhile, Bentley has taken extreme measures in salvaging her credibility by monitoring Ellie's activity on the laptop. Chuck confronts Bentley about interfering with his family, and discovers a surveillance video of Ellie. Bentley later comments that Ellie, is incredibly smart and that if anyone could figure out the Intersect it is her, though she cautions Chuck about taking Ellie into the spy world.

As Devon switches the hard drive with a blank one, Ellie arrives home, having realized the purpose of her father's research. Ellie reveals that Stephen was trying to upload knowledge into the brain without having to learn it. Devon still delivers the hard drive to Chuck; when he returns to Ellie, however, it is revealed that Ellie is still working on same research. Devon and Ellie have agreed to hide the truth from Chuck.

While Ellie is asleep, the laptop scans the room and identifies her, allocating her files and displaying the words "Agent X Files".

== Production ==
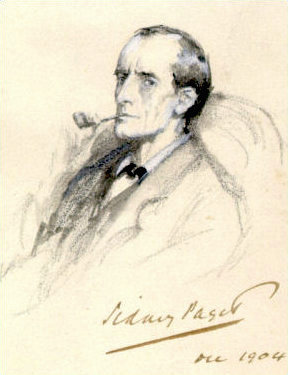
Sherlock Holmes served as an inspiration for the episode.

Series co-creator Chris Fedak revealed to EW.com, "We've always wanted to do a murder mystery, so we're working on an episode right now where something terrible happens to someone down in Castle and Chuck and Co. are given the Sherlockian job of figuring out who the murder[er] is... So we're working on our own spy version of a chamber piece."

The use of Journey's song "Any Way You Want It" as Brody's ringtone alludes to the pilot episode, where Chuck had the same ringtone when receiving a call from Morgan.

== Music ==
Songs listed by Alan Sepinwall.

- "I Need You" by The Blood Arm
- "Any Way You Want It" by Journey
- "Victim" by Win Win
- "Move to the Mountains" by Clock Opera

== Cultural references ==
- Chuck continually mentions his failed leadership attempt the last time he played Dungeons & Dragons.
- Chuck reveals that Lewis's World of Warcraft guild pioneered in taking down Deathwing.
- Morgan is tasked with testing the candidates' "cultural knowledge", asking the following questions:
  - "Rush's best album?"
    - Lewis answers Caress of Steel.
  - "Charlton Heston sci-fi question for you. What's cooler: Soylent Green or Omega Man?"
    - Damien identifies it as a trick question and answers "POTA" (Planet of the Apes).
  - "Favorite Bond: Connery excluded?"
  - "Most important graphic novelist: Grant Morrison or Moore/Gibbons?"
    - Brody and Chuck agree on Brian K. Vaughan.
- When Chuck finds a knife in Lewis's bag, he says, "Well lookie what we have here." This is in reference to the line from Back to the Future.
- The Large Mart pig is named "Kevin Bacon" after the actor of the same name.
- In response to Chuck ruling out Lewis as the killer after finding his body, Bentley says, "Brilliant deduction, Sherlock", referencing the fictional detective Sherlock Holmes.

== Reception ==
"Chuck Versus the Muuurder" received generally positive reviews from critics. HitFix writer Alan Sepinwall wrote that "the actual muuurder investigation of 'Chuck vs. the Muuurder' was the least interesting part of an episode that I enjoyed on the whole. It's such a familiar device that we know a lot of how it works, including the way that the first suspect or two simply can't have done it because we still have a lot of time to fill. The four Intersect candidates were all fairly cartoonish, even by 'Chuck' standards... and the Bentley character has suffered from one of the few real guest casting missteps this show has made in a while, so I didn't particularly care which of them did it, so long as most of them (with the ironic exception of our swarthy bearded killer) were off my screen for good by episode's end... Fortunately, the murder mystery had a secondary element to it in Chuck's need to prove himself as a leader, and that part of the story was very strong." Steve Heisler of The A.V. Club gave the episode a C+. Though he criticized the lack of importance of the series' civilian characters (excluding Morgan) in the episode, he wrote that the episode was "decent fun." Heisler concluded, "'Muuurder' took on a lot, and to its credit managed to make some sense of it all, even if it did resort to cheap, repetitive BM humor (not that I'm above a good BM joke). It's just that, at the end of the day, nothing much happened."

Eric Goldman of IGN gave this episode a score of 9 out of 10, writing, "After an off episode last week, this was a much more enjoyable Chuck installment, that took a time-honored formula ('One of us is a murderer!') and ran with it in classic Chuck style... Some episodes do a better job with a Buy More subplot than others, but the one this week was pretty great... The way this plotline merged with Chuck's had a rather hysterical payoff. I loved seeing little Kevin Bacon running for his life and then being blasted forward by an explosion, in a classic action movie hero style."

The episode continued Chuck's steady decline in viewership, drawing 4.23 million viewers, a series low at the time of the episode's airing.
