= Mother Love (entertainer) =

American entertainer

- Born: Jo Anne Hart; December 29, 1953 (age 72); Cleveland, Ohio, U.S.
- Occupations: Presenter; author; actress; comedian
- Years active: 1977–present
- Spouse: Kennedy Rogers (m. 1972)

Jo Anne Hart (born December 29, 1953), better known by her stage name Mother Love, is an American presenter, author, actress, and comedian.

Hart was born one of six siblings and grew up in a Cleveland, Ohio housing project. Her first job was as a school bus driver. She began her career in stand-up comedy in Columbus, Ohio. From 1998 to 2000, Mother Love was the original host of Forgive or Forget, on syndicated television. In addition, she hosted radio shows in Los Angeles on KLSX, KBIG, KACE-FM, and on KFI. She appeared in Volcano, Mr. Nanny, and 10 other films. she played herself On The Torkelsons before it became Almost Home

Mother Love is the author of three books: Listen Up Girlfriends; Forgive or Forget: Never Underestimate the Power of Forgiveness; and Half the Mother Twice the Love: My Journey to Better Health with Diabetes. She was a co-host for dLife, which was seen Sundays on CNBC from 2005 to 2013. She is a spokesperson for the American Diabetes Association's (ADA) "I Decide to Fight Diabetes" Campaign and was tapped to be spokesperson for the ADA's new "Choose to Live" program. Love is a former spokesperson for Glucerna products. Mother Love traveled the country with Novo, who sponsored her "Mother Love Presents Diabetes Awareness" tour.
