= Similac =

Brand of infant formula

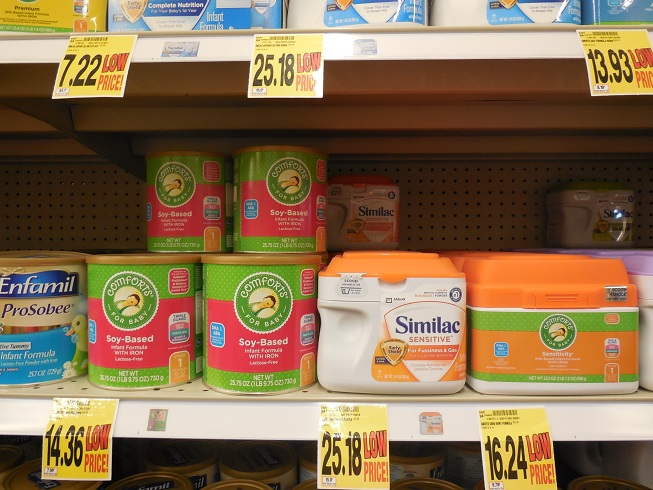
- Similac infant formula in a supermarket aisle
- Product type: Infant formula; Organic infant formula; Soy-based infant formula; Prenatal vitamins; Breastfeeding supplements
- Current owner: Abbott Laboratories
- Country: United States
- Introduced: 1925; 101 years ago
- Related brands: Pure Bliss; Go & Grow
- Markets: Worldwide
- Previous owners: Moores & Ross Milk Company
- Ambassadors: Jennylyn Mercado; Dennis Trillo
- Tagline: Because of Science
- Website: similac.com; pureblissbaby.com

Similac (for "similar to lactation") is a brand of infant formula that was developed by Alfred Bosworth of Tufts University and marketed by Abbott Laboratories. It was first released in the late 1920s, and then reformulated and concentrated in 1951. Today, Similac is sold in 96 countries worldwide.

== History ==
- 1903 - Harry C. Moores and Stanley M. Ross launch the Moores & Ross Milk Company which specialized on bottling milk for home delivery.
- 1925 - Alfred Bosworth creates an infant formula called “Franklin Infant Food”, later renamed to Similac.
- 1928 - Company renames itself to "M & R Diatetic Laboratories", sells off its regular milk operations to Borden and focuses on infant milk.
- 1950 - Company introduces "Similac Concentrated Liquid" in the USA, a non-powder infant formula.
- 1959 - Company launches "Similac with Iron", an iron-fortified infant formula.
- 1961 - Similac opens a new plant in The Netherlands, its first factory outside of the US
- 1962 - Similac begins offering "Similac PM 60/40", for babies with specific medical conditions.
- 1964 - Company merges with Abbott Laboratories.
- 1966 - Similac introduces "Isomil", a soy-based formula.
- 1970 - Similac arrives in Israel.
- 1994 - Similac launches "NeoCare", a formula tailored to premature babies. Later renamed to "Similac NeoSure".
- 1999 - Similac creates "Similac with Iron Ready to Feed" formula bottle.
- 2000 - Similac starts offering "Human Milk Fortifier".
- 2002 - Similac introduces "Similac Advance with Iron", an infant formula with DHA and ARA.
- 2006 - Similac launches "Similac Organic", a certified USDA organic infant formula.
- 2011 - Simiilac launches "Similac Advance Plus", "Similac LeMehadrin" and "Similac Gentle" (lactose-free formula).
- 2013
  - Similac begins offering "Similac Human Milk Fortifier Concentrated Liquid" for preterm babies in NICUs.
  - Similac launches a formula designed for breastfeeding moms who choose to supplement.
  - Similac launches "The Baby Journal" app, Diaper Decoder and Ecodu developmental kits.
- 2014
  - Similac promotes "Similac Breastfeeding Supplement" for nursing mothers.
  - Gain products like Gain, Gain Plus and Gain School we're included in the Similac line up.
- 2015
  - Similac brings forward "Similac Advance NON-GMO", a formula with ingredients not genetically engineered.
  - Similac delivers a "big hit" commercial, whereby actress sisters Hilary and Haylie Duff teamed with Similac "to help raise awareness against mom-on-mom bullying".
- 2016
  - Similac introduces "Go & Grow by Similac Food Mix-Ins", a supplement designed to mix into the food of toddlers.
  - Similac begins offering "Pure Bliss by Similac", a formula starting with fresh milk from grass-fed cows that has no artificial growth hormones or antibiotics.
  - Similac launches "Similac Pro-Advance" and "Similac Pro-Sensitive", formulas containing 2’-FL Human Milk Oligosaccharide.
- 2022
  - By February 2022, Abbott had initiated a voluntary recall of some Similac and Alimentum powdered infant formula (PIF) after finding evidence of Cronobacter sakazakii in some areas of Abbott's Sturgis, Michigan facility, known for manufacturing Similac, the leading PIF brand. In the US, about 90% of the multibillion-dollar PIF market is controlled by only four companies, including Abbott, and the Sturgis facility is Abbott's largest. Most of Abbott's powdered formula was produced there—mainly under the Similac brand name—representing 40% of the US market. The Office of the Commissioner of the Food and Drug Administration (FDA) published a May 2022 update on the recall of certain Similac, Alimentum and EleCare products as they investigate four cases of hospitalized infants involving Cronobacter sakazakii infection following the infants' consumption of PIF produced in Sturgis plant. Abbott shut down the Sturgis plant, out of an abundance of caution. There is no evidence that the infants' infections were caused by the powdered formula. The closure of the Sturgis plant for five months exacerbated the 2022 United States infant formula shortage which peaked in May. As of June 2022, the FDA was unable to prove a causal relationship between the deaths of nine infants who had consumed Abbott's PIF and Abbott products. The plant reopened in June.

== Product lineup ==
Premature

Preemie Product	Product Description	Date
Similac NeoSure	For babies who were born prematurely	1994

Newborn & Infants

Infant Product	Product Description	Date
Similac Soy Isomil	Soy-based infant formula	1966
Similac Organic	Certified USDA Organic formula	2006
Similac Alimentum	A supplemental beverage for children with severe food allergies, sensitivity to intact protein, protein maldigestion, or fat malabsorption	-
Similac Sensitive	Designed for fussiness and gas due to lactose sensitivity, or mild spit-up	-
Similac For Spit-Up	Milk-based formula with added rice starch to help reduce frequent spit-up	-
Similac Total Comfort	For discomfort due to persistent feeding issues	-
Similac For Supplementation	Formula for breastfeeding mothers who choose to introduce formula	2013
Similac Advance NON-GMO	Milk-based, iron-fortified infant formula with no genetically engineered organisms.	2015
Similac Pro-Advance	Formula with 2’-FL HMO designed to help strengthen a baby’s immune system to be more like the breastfed infant’s	2016
Similac Pro-Sensitive	Formula containing 2’-FL Human Milk Oligosaccharide (HMO) and helping with fussiness, gas, or mild spit-up due to lactose sensitivity	2016
Pure Bliss by Similac Infant Formula	Formula starting with fresh milk from grass-fed cows that has no artificial growth hormones or antibiotics.	2016-09-26

Toddlers

Toddler Product	Product Description	Date
Go & Grow by Similac Sensitive	Suitable for children with lactose sensitivity	-
Go & Grow by Similac NON-GMO	A milk-based drink for toddlers 12–24 months old with no GMOs.	2015
Go & Grow by Similac Food Mix-Ins	Provides nutrients to support growth and development in a toddler's food.	2016
Pure Bliss by Similac Toddler Drink	Toddler drink starting with fresh milk from grass-fed cows that has no artificial growth hormones or antibiotics.	2016-09-26

For Mothers

Mother Product	Product Description	Date
Similac Breastfeeding Supplement	Breastfeeding supplements	2014
Similac Prenatal Vitamin	Prenatal vitamins	-

== Ingredients ==
Each formula contains various ingredients but most have OptiGRO, a mixture containing

- DHA
- Lutein
- Vitamin E
- Nucleotides
- Antioxidants
- Prebiotics

== In popular culture ==
- In his 2004 stand-up special Never Scared, Chris Rock mentions Similac: "I'm not talking about rich, I'm talking about wealth, ok? I'm talking about the white family that owns all the fucking Similac."
