= Primetime Emmy Award for Outstanding Stunt Coordination for a Comedy Series or Variety Program =

Television award category

Primetime Emmy Award for Stunt Coordination for a Comedy Series or Variety Program
- Awarded for: Outstanding Stunt Coordination for a Comedy Series or Variety Program
- Country: United States
- Presented by: Academy of Television Arts & Sciences
- First award: 2013
- Currently held by: Eddie Perez, Shameless (2020)
- Website: http://www.emmys.com/

The Primetime Emmy Award for Outstanding Stunt Coordination for a Comedy Series or Variety Program is awarded to one television program each year.

Prior to 2013, all programs competed in a combined category for Outstanding Stunt Coordination, but now this is split into two awards, the subject of this article, and the Outstanding Stunt Coordination for a Drama Series, Limited Series, or Movie.

In the following list, the first titles listed in gold are the winners; those not in gold are nominees, which are listed in alphabetical order. The years given are those in which the ceremonies took place:

== Winners and nominations ==
Outstanding Stunt Coordination

=== 2000s ===
Year	Program	Episode	Nominee	Network
2002 (54th)
2002 (54th)	Uprising	"Part 2"	Steve Griffin	NBC
2002 (54th)	Alias	"Time Will Tell"	Jeff Habberstad	ABC
2002 (54th)	Band of Brothers	"Carentan"	Greg Powell	HBO
2002 (54th)	Malcolm in the Middle	"Company Picnic"	Bobby Porter	Fox
2002 (54th)	Third Watch	"Superheroes"	Cort Hessler	NBC
2003 (55th)
2003 (55th)	Alias	"The Telling"	Jeff Habberstad	ABC
2003 (55th)	Fastlane	"Asslane"	Dick Ziker	Fox
2003 (55th)	Third Watch	"Crash and Burn"	Cort L. Hessler III	NBC
2003 (55th)	24	"Day 2: 10:00 a.m. – 11:00 a.m."	Eddy Donno	Fox
2004 (56th)
2004 (56th)	24	"Day 3: 10:00 a.m. – 11:00 a.m."	Greg Barnett	Fox
2004 (56th)	Alias	"Resurrection"	Jeff Habberstad	ABC
2004 (56th)	Third Watch	"Payback"	Cort L. Hessler III	NBC
2005 (57th)
2005 (57th)	24	"Day 4: 12:00 p.m. – 1:00 a.m."	Matt Taylor	Fox
2005 (57th)	Alias	"The Awful Truth"	Jeff Habberstad	ABC
2005 (57th)	ER	"The Show Must Go On"	Cort L. Hessler III	NBC
2005 (57th)	The Last Ride		Artie Malesci	USA
2005 (57th)	Star Trek: Enterprise	"Borderland," "Cold Station 12"	Vince Deadrick Jr.	UPN
2006 (58th)
2006 (58th)	E-Ring	"Snatch and Grab"	Jimmy Romano	NBC
2006 (58th)	Alias	"Reprisal," "All the Time in the World"	Shauna Duggins	ABC
2006 (58th)	NUMB3RS	"Harvest"	Jim Vickers	CBS
2006 (58th)	24	"Day 5: 9:00 p.m. – 10:00 p.m."	Jeff Cadiente	Fox
2006 (58th)	The Unit	"First Responders"	Norman Howell	CBS
2007 (59th)
2007 (59th)	CSI: Miami	"Rush"	Jim Vickers	CBS
2007 (59th)	CSI: NY	"Sleight Out Of Hand"	Norman Howell	CBS
2007 (59th)	ER	"Bloodline"	Gary Hymes	NBC
2007 (59th)	Heroes	"Genesis"	Ian Quinn	NBC
2007 (59th)	24	"Day 6: 2:00 p.m. – 3:00 p.m."	Jeff Cadiente	Fox
2008 (60th)
2008 (60th)	Chuck	"Chuck Versus the Undercover Lover"	Merritt Yohnka	NBC
2008 (60th)	Criminal Minds	"Tabula Rasa"	Tom Elliott	CBS
2008 (60th)	CSI: NY	"Playing With Matches"	Norman Howell	CBS
2008 (60th)	NCIS	"Requiem"	Diamond Farnsworth	CBS
2008 (60th)	Terminator: The Sarah Connor Chronicles	"Gnothi Seauton"	Joel Kramer	Fox
2009 (61st)
2009 (61st)	Chuck	"Chuck Versus the First Date"	Merritt Yohnka	NBC
2009 (61st)	Burn Notice	"Lesser Evil"	Artie Malesci	USA
2009 (61st)	Criminal Minds	"Normal"	Tom Elliott	CBS
2009 (61st)	My Name Is Earl	"Bullies"	Al Jones	NBC
2009 (61st)	24	"Day 7: 5:00 p.m. – 6:00 p.m."	Jeff Cadiente	Fox

=== 2010s ===
Year	Program	Episode	Nominee	Network
2010 (62nd)
2010 (62nd)	FlashForward	"No More Good Days"	Danny Weselis	ABC
2010 (62nd)	Chuck	Chuck Versus the Tic Tac	Merritt Yohnka	NBC
2010 (62nd)	House	"Brave Heart"	Jim Vickers	Fox
2010 (62nd)	Human Target	"Run"	Dean Choe	Fox
2010 (62nd)	24	"Day 8: 6:00 p.m. – 7:00 p.m."	Jeff David Cadiente	Fox
2011 (63rd)
2011 (63rd)	Southland	"Graduation Day"	Peewee Piemonte	TNT
2011 (63rd)	Game of Thrones	"The Wolf and the Lion"	Paul Jennings	HBO
2011 (63rd)	Hawaii Five-0	"Ua Hiki Mai Kapalena Pau"	Jeff David Cadiente	CBS
2011 (63rd)	Spartacus: Gods of the Arena	"The Bitter End"	Allan Poppleton	Starz
2012 (64th)
2012 (64th)	Southland	"Wednesday"	Peewee Piemonte	TNT
2012 (64th)	American Horror Story		Tim Davison	FX
2012 (64th)	Criminal Minds	"The Bittersweet Science"	Tom Elliott	CBS
2012 (64th)	Grimm	"The Woman in Black"	Matt Taylor	NBC
2012 (64th)	Hawaii Five-0	"Kame'e"	Jeff David Cadiente	CBS
2012 (64th)	NCIS: Los Angeles	"Blye K"	Troy James Brown	CBS

Outstanding Stunt Coordination for a Comedy Series or Variety Program

Year	Program	Nominee(s)	Network
2013 (65th)
2013 (65th)	Supah Ninjas	Hiro Koda	Nickelodeon
2013 (65th)	It's Always Sunny in Philadelphia	Marc Scizak	FX
2013 (65th)	Modern Family	Jim Sharp	ABC
2013 (65th)	Workaholics	Jim Vickers	Comedy Central
2014 (66th)
2014 (66th)	Brooklyn Nine-Nine	Norman Howell	Fox
2014 (66th)	Community	Casey O'Neill	NBC
2014 (66th)	It's Always Sunny in Philadelphia	Marc Scizak	FX
2014 (66th)	Sam & Cat	Vince Deadrick Jr.	Nickelodeon
2014 (66th)	Shameless	Julie Michaels	Showtime
2015 (67th)
2015 (67th)	Brooklyn Nine-Nine	Norman Howell	Fox
2015 (67th)	Community	Ben Scott	Yahoo!
2015 (67th)	It's Always Sunny in Philadelphia	Marc Scizak	FX
2015 (67th)	Saturday Night Live	Jeffrey Lee Gibson	NBC
2015 (67th)	Unbreakable Kimmy Schmidt	Jill Brown	Netflix
2016 (68th)
2016 (68th)	Shameless	Eddie Perez	Showtime
2016 (68th)	Angie Tribeca	Erik Solky	TBS
2016 (68th)	Brooklyn Nine-Nine	Norman Howell	Fox
2016 (68th)	K.C. Undercover	Hiro Koda and Timothy Eulich	Disney
2016 (68th)	Saturday Night Live	Brian Smyj	NBC
2017 (69th)
2017 (69th)	Shameless	Eddie Perez	Showtime
2017 (69th)	Angie Tribeca	Erik Solky	TBS
2017 (69th)	Brooklyn Nine-Nine	Norman Howell	Fox
2017 (69th)	Saturday Night Live	Brian Smyj	NBC
2017 (69th)	Unbreakable Kimmy Schmidt	Jill Brown	Netflix
2018 (70th)
2018 (70th)	GLOW	Shauna Diggins	Netflix
2018 (70th)	Brooklyn Nine-Nine	Norman Howell	Fox
2018 (70th)	Cobra Kai	Hiro Koda	YouTube
2018 (70th)	Saturday Night Live	Brian Smyj	NBC
2018 (70th)	Shameless	Eddie Perez	Showtime
2019 (71st)
2019 (71st)	GLOW	Shauna Diggins	Netflix
2019 (71st)	Barry	Wade Allen	HBO
2019 (71st)	Cobra Kai	Hiro Koda and Jahnel Curfman	YouTube
2019 (71st)	Russian Doll	Christopher Place	Netflix
2019 (71st)	The Tick	Chris Cenatiempo	Amazon

=== 2020s ===
Year	Program	Nominee(s)	Network
2020 (72nd)
2020 (72nd)	Shameless	Eddie Perez	Showtime
2020 (72nd)	Ballers	Jeff Barnett	HBO
2020 (72nd)	Brooklyn Nine-Nine	Norman Howell	NBC
2020 (72nd)	Henry Danger	Vince Deadrick Jr.	Nickelodeon
2020 (72nd)	Space Force	Erik Solky	Netflix
2022 (74th)	Outstanding Stunt Coordination for a Comedy Series or Variety Program		
2022 (74th)	Barry	Wade Allen	HBO/HBO Max
2022 (74th)	Cobra Kai	Ken Barefield	Netflix
2022 (74th)	Hawkeye	Heidi Moneymaker and Noon Orsatti	Disney+
2022 (74th)	Peacemaker	Wayne Dalglish and Gaston Morrison	HBO Max
2022 (74th)	The Righteous Gemstones	John Copeman	HBO
2022 (74th)	What We Do In The Shadows	Tig Fong and JF Lachapelle	FX

== Programs with multiple awards ==
3 awards

- Shameless

2 awards

- Brooklyn Nine-Nine
- Chuck
- GLOW

== Programs with multiple nominations ==
6 nominations

- Brooklyn Nine-Nine

5 nominations

- Shameless

4 nominations

- Saturday Night Live

3 nominations

- Chuck
- It's Always Sunny in Philadelphia
- Cobra Kai

2 nominations

- Angie Tribeca
- Community
- GLOW
- Unbreakable Kimmy Schmidt
