= Chuck Versus the Marlin =

- Chuck episode
- Big Mike in his office, with Norman missing
- Episode no.: Season 1 Episode 13
- Directed by: Allan Kroeker
- Written by: Matthew Lau
- Production code: 3T6462
- Original air date: January 24, 2008

Guest appearances
- Mark Derwin as Detective Conway; Noureen DeWulf as Lizzie Shafai; Bonita Friedericy as Diane Beckman; Ryan McPartlin as Devon Woodcomb; Tony Todd as Langston Graham; Scott Krinsky as Jeff Barnes; Vik Sahay as Lester Patel; Mark Christopher Lawrence as "Big Mike" Tucker

Episode chronology
← Previous "Chuck Versus the Undercover Lover"	Next → "Chuck Versus the First Date"

"Chuck Versus the Marlin" is the 13th episode and season finale of the first season of Chuck. It aired in a special two-episode block on NBC on January 24, 2008 with "Chuck Versus the Undercover Lover." Chuck's time as a civilian may be coming to a close when a Fulcrum bug is discovered at the Buy More, while Devon asks Chuck for a very personal favor.

== Plot summary ==
The episode begins with Jeff and Lester reviewing footage they shot of women's cleavage with one of the store's demo cameras when Chuck arrives to remind them of Big Mike's warning about "Mammary Cam." The two Nerd Herders protest the accusation, but while chewing them out, Chuck is confronted by Devon who wants to ask him a question. Chuck discovers a bug hidden on one of the Nerd Herd's displays and flashes. He has to dodge Devon for a moment to confront Casey, who he believes had placed the bug. Casey denies it and leaves. Chuck then returns to where Awesome is waiting at the Video Wall. Devon has come to ask Chuck for permission to marry Ellie, as he considers him the man of the family. Chuck gives his blessing and Devon asks Chuck to hide his great-grandmother's ring so Ellie can't find it. Meanwhile, Casey alerts Sarah about the bug, and she acknowledges that they have a problem. General Beckman identifies the device as a Fulcrum bug, and tells them Chuck's time as a civilian may be over.

The next morning, Big Mike arrives at the store and is oblivious to the place having been completely cleaned out until he reaches his office and discovers his prized Marlin is missing. The rest of the employees soon arrive with Lester acting particularly panicked, but Jeff tells him to keep his mouth shut. When Chuck arrives, he rushes to his locker, where he hid Awesome's ring and discovers it missing. While Big Mike grills the rest of the employees with Detective Conway (Mark Derwin), he demands to know where Casey is and sends Chuck to find him. Casey demands Chuck join him at a warehouse, where Chuck discovers the CIA and NSA have completely cleaned out the Buy More to check for more bugs. They find a total of 29 short-range GLG-20 listening devices including the one Chuck discovered, but there's no sign of a receiver for the bugs. Chuck praises their thoroughness and asks for Awesome's ring back, but Sarah tells him there was no ring in the inventory. She and Casey then tell him that if the receiver isn't recovered he will be taken into protective custody.

The government team discovers that the store's security system was mistakenly turned back ON by Jeff and Lester the night before, and caught the Fulcrum agent who planted the bugs on tape. They cannot identify the agent, but the security tapes shows the receiver being placed inside Big Mike's Marlin. Jeff and Lester then make off with the fish after the Fulcrum agent leaves.

=== Jeff and Lester ===
Throughout the first half of the episode, Lester is on the verge of panic and acts suspiciously, while Jeff continuously threatens him if he "talks." After seeing them on the Buy More security tape, Chuck and Casey drag Jeff and Lester into the Home Theater Room, where Casey intimidates them into confessing. After Jeff was cut off (again) at the local Bennigan's bar, he and Lester came back to the store to access Big Mike's stash of liquor in his desk. Intending to turn the security cameras off so as to leave no trace of their intrusion, they instead mistakenly turned the security cameras back on, unaware there was a real intruder in the store. They arrive in Big Mike's office to discover his stash is already empty, and decide they have to do something else. Jeff suggests they burn it down, while Lester instead decides on stealing something and makes off with Big Mike's Marlin, which they stash back at Chuck's apartment.

=== Morgan ===
Chuck and Casey rush back to his house and begin searching for the missing Marlin. During their search they are interrupted by Ellie. Anticipating he may not be able to see her again, Chuck tells her goodbye "just in case." She then tells him she saw Morgan leaving with the fish.

The duo returns to the store. While Chuck is called in to Big Mike's office to be questioned by Conway, Casey takes Morgan to the Home Theater Room and interrogates him on the location of the Marlin, turning to grape soda "on the rocks" (which Casey tries but is disgusted by) when threats fail. Morgan reveals that the night before the store was cleaned out, he grabbed Chuck's bag from his locker and went back to Chuck's apartment to play an advanced copy of the next Call of Duty game that Chuck had refused to let him play unless Morgan was under "adult supervision." While he was digging through the bag, he discovered the ring Chuck was holding for Awesome. He freaked out and Ellie, who was in the living room, rushed in. Morgan mistakenly believed the ring was for Sarah. Casey presses him on the Marlin, but Morgan is too wrapped up with the thought that Chuck was going to propose to Sarah. Before he can extract any more information from him, the Schwarma Girl arrives with a lunch delivery from Pita Palace and Morgan slips out. While eating, Jeff and Lester ask him what he told Casey, and where he hid the Marlin. Morgan tells them he hid it in the freezer at the Wienerlicious. The delivery girl overhears them and leaves.

=== Lizzie ===
Lizzie (Noureen DeWulf) is the delivery girl for Pita Palace. She makes a delivery for Jeff and Lester at the beginning of the episode and hangs out for a bit, where they film her on "Mammary Cam" before she leaves. While Chuck is being interrogated by Big Mike and Conway, she arrives again. After being left alone, Chuck overhears Lizzie mention to the Buy More crew that this is Jeff and Lester's 30th delivery. Chuck makes the connection that Lizzie had previously made 29 deliveries, and 29 bugs had been found in the store. He sneaks out of Big Mike's office through the ceiling and finds the "Mammary Cam" recording in Jeff and Lester's secret hiding spot. He returns to the office and uses Big Mike's computer to view the video, and confirms his suspicions and sees Jeff and Lester had caught Lizzie planting a bug without realizing it. Lizzie is the Fulcrum agent and Chuck hurriedly sends Sarah an e-mail before Big Mike and Conway return, after which they let him leave and call in Casey before he can further interrogate Morgan. Chuck grabs Morgan, who confesses that he saw the ring. Chuck demands to know what he did with it and lightly slaps him when Morgan initially refuses to answer. Morgan tells him he hid it in the Marlin, which is at the Wienerlicious.

Meanwhile, Lizzie, who had overheard Morgan telling Jeff and Lester where he hid the Marlin, heads to the Wienerlicious and arrives just as Sarah receives Chuck's warning. She tries to gain access to the freezer but Sarah refuses and the two engage in a fight. The two women are evenly matched, but Lizzie manages to get to a gun and imprisons Sarah in the freezer. Chuck arrives to find the Marlin broken on the restaurant floor and Lizzie, the receiver, and the ring gone. He hears Sarah call for help and finds her locked in the freezer. At her instructions, he finds a gun hidden in a tub of horseradish sauce and bumbles his way through trying to shoot the lock. However, Detective Conway arrives at the behest of Big Mike and sees the gun in Chuck's hand, taking Chuck into custody despite his protests that he was trying to help Sarah out of the freezer.

After Casey is finally released from his interrogation, he tracks down Morgan, forcing the location of the Marlin from him, and hurries to the Wienerlicious. He rescues Sarah from the freezer, who tells him Lizzie planted the bugs and that Conway arrested Chuck. They report in to Beckman with the information, who has decided to extract Chuck anyway. Sarah and Casey are ordered to track down Lizzie. Sarah objects but Casey accepts the General's instructions. After they break contact with Beckman, he tells Sarah he'll take care of Lizzie while she tracks down Chuck.

=== Conway ===
While in his car, Chuck tries to reason with Conway, but the detective doesn't listen. Conway makes a phone call and reports in to his superiors as "Longshore." Chuck flashes and realizes that Conway is actually CIA. Longshore tries to encourage Chuck that things aren't going to be so bad in government custody - he'll have every amenity he needs, and will be allowed outside in controlled locations. He admits though that it's safer for Chuck's family and friends that he just disappear and for them not to know what's happened.

He takes Chuck to a rooftop helipad for extraction, where the two are confronted by Sarah. Sarah tells Longshore they've identified Lizzie as the Fulcrum agent and will soon have the receiver so there's no longer a need to extract the Intersect, but he tells her he has received no instructions to that effect. She asks Longshore for just a few minutes to talk to Chuck, and is ready to draw her gun (hidden behind her back) until Longshore agrees. Chuck asks her to tell his family and friends something to make his disappearance easier to bear, and that since they no longer work together, he and Sarah can be honest with each other about how they really feel.

The three are then ambushed by Lizzie, who kills Longshore and shoots Sarah's gun from her hand. Sarah and Chuck take cover while Lizzie gloats about knowing that Chuck is the Intersect. She also has Awesome's ring for Ellie. While Chuck creates a distraction, Sarah sneaks up on Lizzie and the two engage in another fight. The two are again evenly matched and the fight takes them dangerously close to the edge of the building. Casey finally arrives to back Sarah up only to watch the two women plummet over the side. They land safely in a garbage bin, where Lizzie is knocked unconscious. The receiver is recovered, and Big Mike arrives at the store the next morning to find that everything is back, including his Marlin (which is now held together by duct tape).

=== Captain Awesome ===
Throughout the episode Devon prepares to ask Ellie to marry him. Chuck tries to buy more time by convincing him to carefully consider how he intends to ask, finally settling on a romantic dinner with the ring hidden inside dessert. However he grows frustrated when Chuck doesn't arrive in time ("this is NOT awesome!"). The ring isn't on Lizzie's finger when they take her into custody, so Chuck asks Sarah to help him search the dumpster where he finally finds it. The two rush back to Chuck's apartment, where he sneaks in through his window to give Devon the ring. Chuck then leaves to watch from outside while Awesome proposes. Sarah tells Chuck he's safe for now and that the extraction order has been canceled. Chuck asks her to come inside to congratulate Ellie, but Sarah tells him that it's a family moment. He looks back at her and tells her "I know," before finally going in alone. Casey arrives, and while Sarah watches Chuck, tells her they won't be able to keep him there forever.

== Production ==
"Chuck Versus the Marlin" was the last episode written before the writers' strike put an end to production. It was decided by Josh Schwartz not to continue with the season, despite the full 22-episode pickup, once the strike concluded and to start afresh again with Season 2. Although not written as such, this made the episode the show's season finale. Schwartz admitted this wasn't the ideal situation, but was the best decision. The episode aired on January 24 as part of a two-episode block. It was preceded by "Chuck Versus the Undercover Lover" at 8pm EST, and an episode of The Apprentice at 9pm. The block was promoted by Zachary Levi, Yvonne Strahovski and Sarah Lancaster.

"Chuck Versus the Marlin" was the second appearance by Fulcrum in the show, and referenced the possibility of Chuck being forcibly relocated to a secure facility for his safety that was previously discussed in "Chuck Versus the Intersect". This episode also marked the last appearance of the Wienerlicious, as Sarah would move to the Orange Orange frozen yogurt shop at the beginning of Season 2. Big Mike's last name was also revealed to be Tucker, and that he named his marlin Norman. Morgan was revealed to have been born by Cesarean section. The GLG-20 device would later be used by the team in "Chuck Versus the Best Friend." This episode is also the first time Chuck is shown handling a gun.

The marlin can be seen in Big Mike's office throughout the season, and this is the first episode to call attention to it. Since Lizzie broke the marlin in half to extract the receiver, the marlin is taped up with duct tape at the end.

=== Production details ===
- The rooftop/helipad where Sarah confronts agent "Longshore" when he attempts to extract Chuck, is the same location where she took Chuck after requesting extraction to protect him from Casey in "Chuck Versus the Intersect"
- Chuck sends the photograph of the Shawarma Girl to Sarah's iPhone via an email to "sarah@wienerlicious.net".
- Sarah: (To a customer) Danke, dass Sie uns im Wienerlicious besucht haben. The translation of this German phrase is: "Thank you for visiting us at Wienerlicious."
- This was the last completed episode before the WGA strike on November 5, 2007.

=== Flashes ===
- Chuck flashes when he first sees the GLG-20 bug.
- When Conway identifies himself by his callsign, "Longshore," Chuck flashes and identifies him as CIA.

== Reception ==
"Chuck Versus the Marlin" was watched by an estimated 7.02 million viewers. ! 18–49 (Rating/Share)

TVSquad found the episode impressive and applauded the sense of doom the episode cast over how long Chuck can remain at the Buy More. Chuck's use of Jeff and Lester's "amateur consumer porn" to identify Lizzie after putting the pieces together was also cited, as was the sign of growth in Casey's character by disobeying orders and telling Sarah to retrieve Chuck from Longshore.

The episode was described as more lackluster by IGN, and that "Chuck Versus the Crown Vic" would have made a superior season finale. It was nonetheless acknowledged the episode was not planned as a finale, which was its main fault. The humor of Big Mike's anger over his missing Marlin, despite it being revealed that he ordered it from eBay and hadn't caught it himself, received high marks, as did the convoluted story, the episode's use of much of the main cast, and the strong interweaving of Chuck's two worlds. IGN found the most poignant and effective scene to be Chuck and Sarah's talk on the rooftop before his imminent extraction, and Levi's ability to so easily turn from comedy to drama was highly praised. The episode received an 8.2 out of 10.

== References to popular culture ==
- Sarah mentions that Casey's bugs were "EM-50's". This is a reference to the EM-50 Urban Assault Vehicle in the 1981 film Stripes, which was designated the EM-50.
- The chip name GLG-20 comes from the 1985 film Spies Like Us with Dan Aykroyd and Chevy Chase as two bumbling decoy spies with the call-sign GLG 20.
- After taking a sip of Grape Drink, Morgan says, "Proper." A reference to MC Hammer's Pepsi campaign.
- When Chuck flashes on the GLG-20 his flash shows a picture of Foxboro Massachusetts followed by a football stadium. This is a reference to spygate, which occurred when the New England patriots who play in Foxboro were suspected of spying/recording the jets signals. Spygate took place the year before this episodes release around the time it would have been being filmed.
