= List of awards and nominations received by Brooklyn Nine-Nine =

Brooklyn Nine-Nine awards and nominations
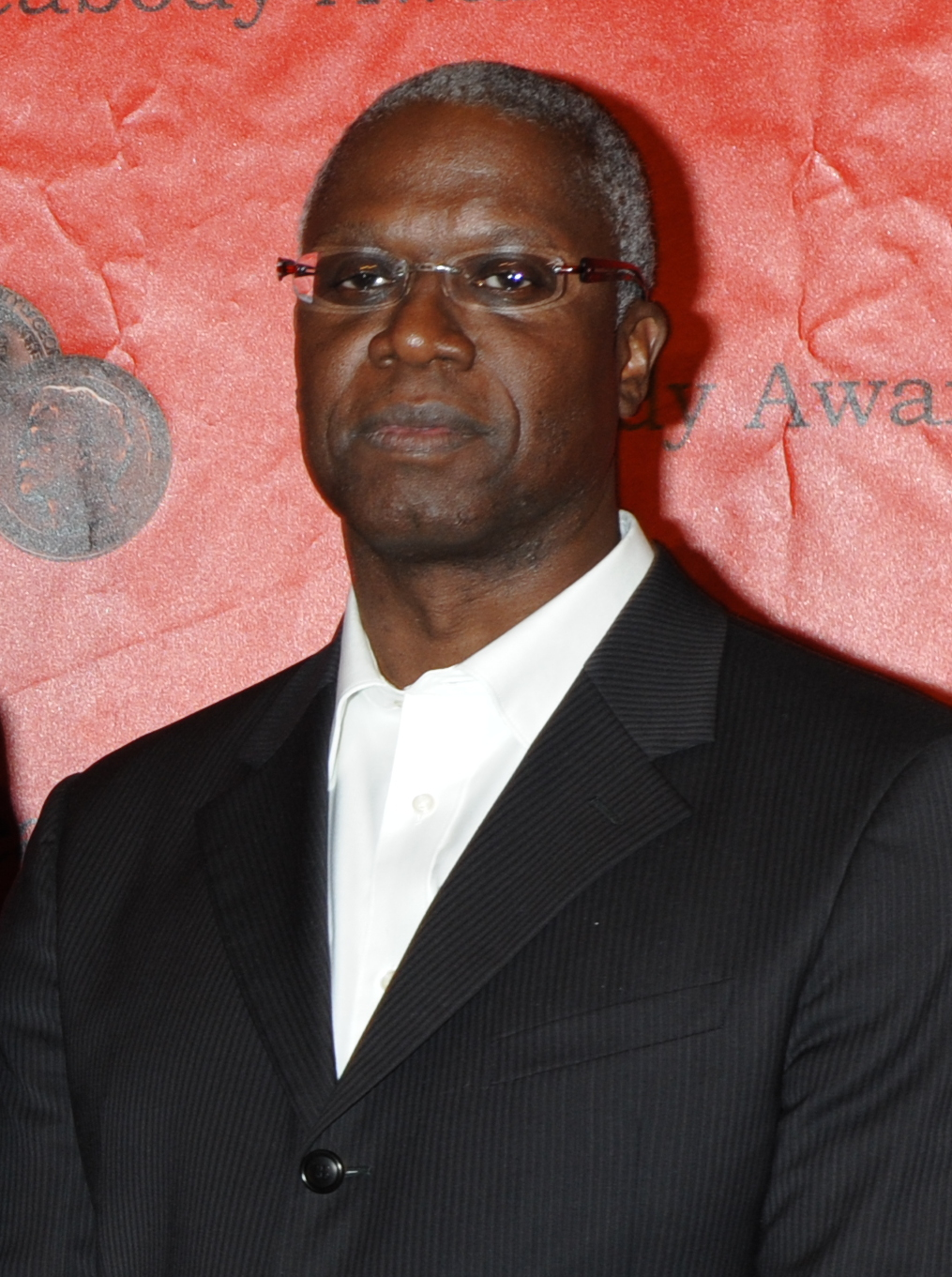
- Andre Braugher's portrayal of Raymond Holt earned him four nominations for the Primetime Emmy Award for Outstanding Supporting Actor in a Comedy Series (2014—2016, 2020)
Awards and nominations
Award	Wins	Nominations
American Comedy Awards	1	3
Black Reel Awards	0	2
Creative Arts Emmy Awards	2	7
Critics' Choice Television Awards	2	5
Edgar Awards	0	1
EWwy Awards	0	2
GLAAD Media Awards	1	6
Golden Globe Awards	2	2
Golden Reel Awards	0	2
Gracie Awards	3	4
Imagen Awards	1	12
NAACP Image Awards	0	8
NHMC Impact Awards	1	1
People's Choice Awards	0	3
Poppy Awards	1	2
Primetime Emmy Awards	0	4
Satellite Awards	0	6
Screen Actors Guild Awards	0	1
Shorty Awards	1	1
TCA Awards	0	2
Teen Choice Awards	0	7

Totals (Note: Certain award groups do not simply award one winner. They acknowledge several different recipients, have runners-up, and have third place. Since this is a specific recognition and is different from losing an award, runner-up mentions are considered wins in this award tally. For simplification and to avoid errors, each award in this list has been presumed to have had a prior nomination.)
- Wins: 15
- Nominations: 81

Brooklyn Nine-Nine is an American police procedural comedy television series created by Dan Goor and Michael Schur. The series revolves around Jake Peralta (Andy Samberg), a detective for the New York City Police Department (NYPD) in Brooklyn's fictional 99th Precinct, who often comes into conflict with his new commanding officer, the serious and stern Captain Raymond Holt (Andre Braugher). The rest of the cast features Stephanie Beatriz as Rosa Diaz, Terry Crews as Terry Jeffords, Melissa Fumero as Amy Santiago, Joe Lo Truglio as Charles Boyle, Chelsea Peretti as Gina Linetti, Dirk Blocker as Michael Hitchcock, and Joel McKinnon Miller as Norm Scully.

Throughout its run, the series was acclaimed by critics for the performances of its cast, especially Samberg and Braugher, who were both nominated for fourteen awards each. While Samberg won a Golden Globe Award for Best Actor – Television Series Musical or Comedy, Braugher was nominated for four Primetime Emmy Awards for Outstanding Supporting Actor in a Comedy Series and won two Critics' Choice Television Awards for Best Supporting Actor in a Comedy Series. In addition, Beatriz received six award nominations, winning an Imagen Award for Best Supporting Actress – Television and two Gracie Awards for Outstanding Actress in a Supporting Role – Comedy or Musical. Furthermore, stunt performer Norman Howell was nominated for the Primetime Emmy Award for Outstanding Stunt Coordination for a Comedy Series or Variety Program six times, winning twice.

The series has also received particular praise for its portrayal of serious issues whilst retaining a sense of humor. For its representation of LGBTQ+ people, the series won a GLAAD Media Award for Outstanding Comedy Series. The series was nominated for eleven Emmy Awards, consisting of four nominations for Primetime Emmy Awards and seven for Creative Arts Emmy Awards. Additionally, the show was nominated for seven Teen Choice Awards, six Satellite Awards, eight NAACP Image Awards, and two Golden Globes. By the time the series ended in 2021, Brooklyn Nine-Nine had won fifteen awards out of a total of eighty-one nominations.

== Awards and nominations ==
Awards and nominations received by Brooklyn Nine-Nine
Award	Year (Note: The listed year refers to the date of the ceremony, not necessarily the year in which the corresponding season or episode aired.)	Category	Nominee(s)	Result	Ref.
American Comedy Awards	2014	Comedy Series	Brooklyn Nine-Nine	Nominated	
American Comedy Awards	2014	Comedy Actor — TV	Andy Samberg	Won	
American Comedy Awards	2014	Comedy Supporting Actress — TV	Chelsea Peretti	Nominated	
Black Reel Awards	2017	Outstanding Supporting Actor, Comedy Series	Andre Braugher	Nominated	
Black Reel Awards	2018	Outstanding Supporting Actor, Comedy Series	Terry Crews	Nominated	
Creative Arts Emmy Awards	2014	Outstanding Stunt Coordination for a Comedy Series or Variety Program	Norman Howell	Won	
Creative Arts Emmy Awards	2015	Outstanding Stunt Coordination for a Comedy Series or Variety Program	Norman Howell	Won	
Creative Arts Emmy Awards	2016	Outstanding Stunt Coordination for a Comedy Series or Variety Program	Norman Howell	Nominated	
Creative Arts Emmy Awards	2017	Outstanding Stunt Coordination for a Comedy Series or Variety Program	Norman Howell	Nominated	
Creative Arts Emmy Awards	2018	Outstanding Guest Actor in a Comedy Series	Sterling K. Brown (for "The Box")	Nominated	
Creative Arts Emmy Awards	2018	Outstanding Stunt Coordination for a Comedy Series or Variety Program	Norman Howell	Nominated	
Creative Arts Emmy Awards	2020	Outstanding Stunt Coordination for a Comedy Series or Variety Program	Norman Howell	Nominated	
Critics' Choice Television Awards	2014	Best Supporting Actor in a Comedy Series	Andre Braugher	Won	
Critics' Choice Television Awards	2016	Best Supporting Actor in a Comedy Series	Andre Braugher	Won	
Critics' Choice Television Awards	2016	Best Supporting Actor in a Comedy Series	Andre Braugher	Nominated	
Critics' Choice Television Awards	2019	Best Actor in a Comedy Series	Andy Samberg	Nominated	
Critics' Choice Television Awards	2020	Best Supporting Actor in a Comedy Series	Andre Braugher	Nominated	
Edgar Awards	2019	Best Television Episode Teleplay	Luke Del Tredici (for "The Box")	Nominated	
EWwy Awards	2014	Best Comedy Series	Brooklyn Nine-Nine	Nominated	
EWwy Awards	2014	Best Actor, Comedy	Andy Samberg	Nominated	
GLAAD Media Awards	2014	Outstanding Comedy Series	Brooklyn Nine-Nine	Nominated	
GLAAD Media Awards	2015	Outstanding Comedy Series	Brooklyn Nine-Nine	Nominated	
GLAAD Media Awards	2016	Outstanding Comedy Series	Brooklyn Nine-Nine	Nominated	
GLAAD Media Awards	2017	Outstanding Comedy Series	Brooklyn Nine-Nine	Nominated	
GLAAD Media Awards	2018	Outstanding Comedy Series	Brooklyn Nine-Nine	Won	
GLAAD Media Awards	2020	Outstanding Comedy Series	Brooklyn Nine-Nine	Nominated	
Golden Globe Awards	2014	Best Actor – Television Series Musical or Comedy	Andy Samberg	Won	
Golden Globe Awards	2014	Best Television Series – Musical or Comedy	Brooklyn Nine-Nine	Won	
Golden Reel Awards	2018	Outstanding Achievement in Sound Editing – Live Action Under 30 Minutes	Brooklyn Nine-Nine (for "The Fugitive")	Nominated	
Golden Reel Awards	2021	Outstanding Achievement in Sound Editing – Live Action Under 35 Minutes	Brooklyn Nine-Nine (for "Lights Out")	Nominated	
Gracie Awards	2015	Outstanding Director – Entertainment	Julie Anne Robinson	Won	
Gracie Awards	2019	Outstanding Actress in a Supporting Role – Comedy or Musical	Chelsea Peretti	Nominated	
Gracie Awards	2019	Outstanding Actress in a Supporting Role – Comedy or Musical	Stephanie Beatriz	Won	
Gracie Awards	2020	Outstanding Actress in a Supporting Role – Comedy or Musical	Stephanie Beatriz	Won	
Imagen Awards	2014	Best Supporting Actress – Television	Stephanie Beatriz	Nominated	
Imagen Awards	2015	Best Primetime Television Program – Comedy	Brooklyn Nine-Nine	Nominated	
Imagen Awards	2015	Best Supporting Actress – Television	Melissa Fumero	Nominated	
Imagen Awards	2016	Best Primetime Television Program – Comedy	Brooklyn Nine-Nine	Nominated	
Imagen Awards	2016	Best Supporting Actress – Television	Stephanie Beatriz	Nominated	
Imagen Awards	2016	Best Supporting Actress – Television	Melissa Fumero	Nominated	
Imagen Awards	2017	Best Primetime Television Program – Comedy	Brooklyn Nine-Nine	Nominated	
Imagen Awards	2018	Best Primetime Television Program – Comedy	Brooklyn Nine-Nine	Nominated	
Imagen Awards	2018	Best Supporting Actress – Television	Stephanie Beatriz	Won	
Imagen Awards	2019	Best Primetime Television Program – Comedy	Brooklyn Nine-Nine	Nominated	
Imagen Awards	2019	Best Supporting Actress – Television	Stephanie Beatriz	Nominated	
Imagen Awards	2019	Best Supporting Actress – Television	Melissa Fumero	Nominated	
NAACP Image Awards	2014	Outstanding Actor in a Comedy Series	Andre Braugher	Nominated	
NAACP Image Awards	2015	Outstanding Actor in a Comedy Series	Andre Braugher	Nominated	
NAACP Image Awards	2015	Outstanding Supporting Actor in a Comedy Series	Terry Crews	Nominated	
NAACP Image Awards	2016	Outstanding Actor in a Comedy Series	Andre Braugher	Nominated	
NAACP Image Awards	2016	Outstanding Supporting Actor in a Comedy Series	Terry Crews	Nominated	
NAACP Image Awards	2020	Outstanding Supporting Actor in a Comedy Series	Andre Braugher	Nominated	
NAACP Image Awards	2020	Outstanding Supporting Actor in a Comedy Series	Terry Crews	Nominated	
NAACP Image Awards	2021	Outstanding Supporting Actor in a Comedy Series	Andre Braugher	Nominated	
NHMC Impact Awards	2015	Outstanding Performance in a Television Series	Melissa Fumero	Won	
People's Choice Awards	2014	Favorite Actor In a New TV Series	Andy Samberg	Nominated	
People's Choice Awards	2016	Favorite Comedic TV Actor	Andy Samberg	Nominated	
People's Choice Awards	2017	Favorite Comedic TV Actor	Andy Samberg	Nominated	
Poppy Awards	2016	Best Supporting Actress, Comedy	Chelsea Peretti	Nominated	
Poppy Awards	2016	Best Actor, Comedy	Andy Samberg	Won	
Primetime Emmy Awards	2014	Outstanding Supporting Actor in a Comedy Series	Andre Braugher	Nominated	
Primetime Emmy Awards	2015	Outstanding Supporting Actor in a Comedy Series	Andre Braugher	Nominated	
Primetime Emmy Awards	2016	Outstanding Supporting Actor in a Comedy Series	Andre Braugher	Nominated	
Primetime Emmy Awards	2020	Outstanding Supporting Actor in a Comedy Series	Andre Braugher	Nominated	
Satellite Awards	2014	Best Actor – Television Series Musical or Comedy	Andre Braugher	Nominated	
Satellite Awards	2014	Best Television Series – Musical or Comedy	Brooklyn Nine-Nine	Nominated	
Satellite Awards	2015	Best Television Series – Musical or Comedy	Brooklyn Nine-Nine	Nominated	
Satellite Awards	2016	Best Television Series – Musical or Comedy	Brooklyn Nine-Nine	Nominated	
Satellite Awards	2017	Best Television Series – Musical or Comedy	Brooklyn Nine-Nine	Nominated	
Satellite Awards	2017	Best Supporting Actor in a Series, Miniseries or TV Film	Andre Braugher	Nominated	
Screen Actors Guild Awards	2015	Outstanding Performance by an Ensemble in a Comedy Series	Brooklyn Nine-Nine	Nominated	
Shorty Awards	2019	Best TV Show	Brooklyn Nine-Nine	Won	
TCA Awards	2014	Outstanding New Program	Brooklyn Nine-Nine	Nominated	
TCA Awards	2014	Outstanding Achievement in Comedy	Brooklyn Nine-Nine	Nominated	
Teen Choice Awards	2014	Choice TV Actor: Comedy	Andy Samberg	Nominated	
Teen Choice Awards	2015	Choice TV Actor: Comedy	Andy Samberg	Nominated	
Teen Choice Awards	2016	Choice TV Actor: Comedy	Andy Samberg	Nominated	
Teen Choice Awards	2017	Choice TV Actor: Comedy	Andy Samberg	Nominated	
Teen Choice Awards	2018	Choice TV Actor: Comedy	Andy Samberg	Nominated	
Teen Choice Awards	2019	Choice Comedy Series	Brooklyn Nine-Nine	Nominated	
Teen Choice Awards	2019	Choice TV Actor: Comedy	Andy Samberg	Nominated	
