= Jeff Barnett (stunt coordinator) =

American stunt performer and stunt coordinator

- Born: Jeffrey G. Barnett; U.S.
- Occupation(s): Stunt performer, stunt coordinator, actor
- Years active: 1980–present
- Spouse: Whitney Barnett (married 2012 - divorced 2023)
- Parent: Gregory J. Barnett (father)
- Relatives: Michael H. Barnett (brother)

Jeffrey G. Barnett, is an American stunt performer and stunt coordinator for film and television.

== Selected filmography ==
As stunt Coordinator

- 2019-2022 – Euphoria
- 2021 – North Hollywood
- 2018-2020 – 9-1-1
- 2018 – Ballers
- 2016-2018 – Baskets
- 2017 – Creep 2
- 2017 – Silicon Valley
- 2012-2017 – Switched at Birth
- 2009 – Southland
- 2007 – Aliens in America

== Awards and nominations ==
Year	Result	Award	Category	Work	Ref.
2020	Nominated	Primetime Emmy Awards	Outstanding Stunt Coordination for a Comedy Series or Variety Program	Ballers	
2011	Nominated	Screen Actors Guild Awards	Outstanding Performance by a Stunt Ensemble in a Television Series	Southland	
2010	Nominated	Screen Actors Guild Awards	Outstanding Performance by a Stunt Ensemble in a Motion Picture	Transformers: Revenge of the Fallen	
2007	Nominated	Taurus World Stunt Awards	Best Fire Stunt	Déjà Vu	
