= Primetime Emmy Award for Outstanding Stunt Coordination =

Television award category

The Primetime Emmy Award for Outstanding Stunt Coordination is awarded to one television program each year per genre category. Comedy or variety and dramas or limited series programs compete in a separate category for stunt coordination. The awards were consolidated prior to 2013 and in 2021. A new award for stunt performers was also created in 2021.

In the following list, the first titles listed in gold are the winners; those not in gold are nominees, which are listed in alphabetical order. The years given are those in which the ceremonies took place:

== Winners and nominations ==
=== 2000s ===
| Year | Program | Episode | Nominee | Network |
Outstanding Stunt Coordination
2002 (54th)
| 2002 (54th) | Uprising | "Part 2" | Steve Griffin | NBC |
| 2002 (54th) | Alias | "Time Will Tell" | Jeff Habberstad | ABC |
| 2002 (54th) | Band of Brothers | "Carentan" | Greg Powell | HBO |
| 2002 (54th) | Malcolm in the Middle | "Company Picnic" | Bobby Porter | Fox |
| 2002 (54th) | Third Watch | "Superheroes" | Cort Hessler | NBC |
2003 (55th)
| 2003 (55th) | Alias | "The Telling" | Jeff Habberstad | ABC |
| 2003 (55th) | Fastlane | "Asslane" | Dick Ziker | Fox |
| 2003 (55th) | Third Watch | "Crash and Burn" | Cort Hessler | NBC |
| 2003 (55th) | 24 | "Day 2: 10:00 a.m. – 11:00 a.m." | Eddy Donno | Fox |
2004 (56th)
| 2004 (56th) | 24 | "Day 3: 10:00 a.m. – 11:00 a.m." | Greg Barnett | Fox |
| 2004 (56th) | Alias | "Resurrection" | Jeff Habberstad | ABC |
| 2004 (56th) | Third Watch | "Payback" | Cort Hessler | NBC |
2005 (57th)
| 2005 (57th) | 24 | "Day 4: 12:00 p.m. – 1:00 a.m." | Matt Taylor | Fox |
| 2005 (57th) | Alias | "The Awful Truth" | Jeff Habberstad | ABC |
| 2005 (57th) | ER | "The Show Must Go On" | Cort Hessler | NBC |
| 2005 (57th) | The Last Ride | | Artie Malesci | USA |
| 2005 (57th) | Star Trek: Enterprise | "Borderland," "Cold Station 12" | Vince Deadrick Jr. | UPN |
2006 (58th)
| 2006 (58th) | E-Ring | "Snatch and Grab" | Jimmy Romano | NBC |
| 2006 (58th) | Alias | "Reprisal," "All the Time in the World" | Shauna Duggins | ABC |
| 2006 (58th) | NUMB3RS | "Harvest" | Jim Vickers | CBS |
| 2006 (58th) | 24 | "Day 5: 9:00 p.m. – 10:00 p.m." | Jeff Cadiente | Fox |
| 2006 (58th) | The Unit | "First Responders" | Norman Howell | CBS |
2007 (59th)
| 2007 (59th) | CSI: Miami | "Rush" | Jim Vickers | CBS |
| 2007 (59th) | CSI: NY | "Sleight Out Of Hand" | Norman Howell | CBS |
| 2007 (59th) | ER | "Bloodline" | Gary Hymes | NBC |
| 2007 (59th) | Heroes | "Genesis" | Ian Quinn | NBC |
| 2007 (59th) | 24 | "Day 6: 2:00 p.m. – 3:00 p.m." | Jeff Cadiente | Fox |
2008 (60th)
| 2008 (60th) | Chuck | "Chuck Versus the Undercover Lover" | Merritt Yohnka | NBC |
| 2008 (60th) | Criminal Minds | "Tabula Rasa" | Tom Elliott | CBS |
| 2008 (60th) | CSI: NY | "Playing With Matches" | Norman Howell | CBS |
| 2008 (60th) | NCIS | "Requiem" | Diamond Farnsworth | CBS |
| 2008 (60th) | Terminator: The Sarah Connor Chronicles | "Gnothi Seauton" | Joel Kramer | Fox |
2009 (61st)
| 2009 (61st) | Chuck | "Chuck Versus the First Date" | Merritt Yohnka | NBC |
| 2009 (61st) | Burn Notice | "Lesser Evil" | Artie Malesci | USA |
| 2009 (61st) | Criminal Minds | "Normal" | Tom Elliott | CBS |
| 2009 (61st) | My Name Is Earl | "Bullies" | Al Jones | NBC |
| 2009 (61st) | 24 | "Day 7: 5:00 p.m. – 6:00 p.m." | Jeff Cadiente | Fox |

=== 2010s ===
| Year | Program | Episode | Nominee | Network |
|---|---|---|---|---|
2010 (62nd)
| 2010 (62nd) | FlashForward | "No More Good Days" | Danny Weselis | ABC |
| 2010 (62nd) | Chuck | "Chuck Versus the Tic Tac" | Merritt Yohnka | NBC |
| 2010 (62nd) | House | "Brave Heart" | Jim Vickers | Fox |
| 2010 (62nd) | Human Target | "Run" | Dean Choe | Fox |
| 2010 (62nd) | 24 | "Day 8: 6:00 p.m. – 7:00 p.m." | Jeff David Cadiente | Fox |
2011 (63rd)
| 2011 (63rd) | Southland | "Graduation Day" | Peewee Piemonte | TNT |
| 2011 (63rd) | Game of Thrones | "The Wolf and the Lion" | Paul Jennings | HBO |
| 2011 (63rd) | Hawaii Five-0 | "Ua Hiki Mai Kapalena Pau" | Jeff David Cadiente | CBS |
| 2011 (63rd) | Spartacus: Gods of the Arena | "The Bitter End" | Allan Poppleton | Starz |
2012 (64th)
| 2012 (64th) | Southland | "Wednesday" | Peewee Piemonte | TNT |
| 2012 (64th) | American Horror Story | | Tim Davison | FX |
| 2012 (64th) | Criminal Minds | "The Bittersweet Science" | Tom Elliott | CBS |
| 2012 (64th) | Grimm | "The Woman in Black" | Matt Taylor | NBC |
| 2012 (64th) | Hawaii Five-0 | "Kame'e" | Jeff David Cadiente | CBS |
| 2012 (64th) | NCIS: Los Angeles | "Blye K" | Troy James Brown | CBS |
| 2013 (65th) | Outstanding Stunt Coordination for a Comedy Series or Variety Program | | | |
| 2013 (65th) | Supah Ninjas | | Hiro Koda | Nickelodeon |
| 2013 (65th) | It's Always Sunny in Philadelphia | | Marc Scizak | FX |
| 2013 (65th) | Modern Family | | Jim Sharp | ABC |
| 2013 (65th) | Workaholics | | Jim Vickers | Comedy Central |
| 2013 (65th) | Outstanding Stunt Coordination for a Drama Series, Limited Series or Movie | | | |
| 2013 (65th) | Revolution | "Nobody's Fault But Mine" | Jeff Wolfe | NBC |
| 2013 (65th) | Blue Bloods | "Secrets & Lies" | Cort Hessler | CBS |
| 2013 (65th) | NCIS | "Revenge" | Diamond Farnsworth | CBS |
| 2013 (65th) | Southland | "Bleed Out" | Peewee Piemonte | TNT |
| 2014 (66th) | Outstanding Stunt Coordination for a Comedy Series or Variety Program | | | |
| 2014 (66th) | Brooklyn Nine-Nine | | Norman Howell | Fox |
| 2014 (66th) | Community | | Casey O'Neill | NBC |
| 2014 (66th) | It's Always Sunny in Philadelphia | | Marc Scizak | FX |
| 2014 (66th) | Sam & Cat | | Vince Deadrick Jr. | Nickelodeon |
| 2014 (66th) | Shameless | | Julie Michaels | Showtime |
| 2014 (66th) | Outstanding Stunt Coordination for a Drama Series, Limited Series or Movie | | | |
| 2014 (66th) | The Blacklist | | Cort Hessler | NBC |
| 2014 (66th) | Game of Thrones | | Paul Herbert | HBO |
| 2014 (66th) | Grimm | | Matthew Taylor | NBC |
| 2014 (66th) | Hawaii Five-0 | | Jeff Cadiente | CBS |
| 2014 (66th) | Revolution | | Jeff Wolfe | NBC |
| 2014 (66th) | True Blood | | Hiro Koda | HBO |
| 2015 (67th) | Outstanding Stunt Coordination for a Comedy Series or Variety Program | | | |
| 2015 (67th) | Brooklyn Nine-Nine | | Norman Howell | Fox |
| 2015 (67th) | Community | | Ben Scott | Yahoo! |
| 2015 (67th) | It's Always Sunny in Philadelphia | | Marc Scizak | FX |
| 2015 (67th) | Saturday Night Live | | Jeffrey Lee Gibson | NBC |
| 2015 (67th) | Unbreakable Kimmy Schmidt | | Jill Brown | Netflix |
| 2015 (67th) | Outstanding Stunt Coordination for a Drama Series, Limited Series or Movie | | | |
| 2015 (67th) | Game of Thrones | | Rowley Irlam | HBO |
| 2015 (67th) | The Blacklist | | Cort Hessler | NBC |
| 2015 (67th) | Boardwalk Empire | | Christopher Place | HBO |
| 2015 (67th) | Sons of Anarchy | | Eric Norris | FX |
| 2015 (67th) | The Walking Dead | | Monty L. Simons | AMC |
| 2016 (68th) | Outstanding Stunt Coordination for a Comedy Series or Variety Program | | | |
| 2016 (68th) | Shameless | | Eddie Perez | Showtime |
| 2016 (68th) | Angie Tribeca | | Erik Solky | TBS |
| 2016 (68th) | Brooklyn Nine-Nine | | Norman Howell | Fox |
| 2016 (68th) | K.C. Undercover | | Hiro Koda and Timothy Eulich | Disney |
| 2016 (68th) | Saturday Night Live | | Brian Smyj | NBC |
| 2016 (68th) | Outstanding Stunt Coordination for a Drama Series, Limited Series or Movie | | | |
| 2016 (68th) | Game of Thrones | | Rowley Irlam | HBO |
| 2016 (68th) | The Blacklist | | Cort Hessler | NBC |
| 2016 (68th) | Gotham | | Norman Douglass | Fox |
| 2016 (68th) | Marvel's Daredevil | | Philip J. Silvera | Netflix |
| 2016 (68th) | Rush Hour | | Jeff Wolfe | CBS |
| 2017 (69th) | Outstanding Stunt Coordination for a Comedy Series or Variety Program | | | |
| 2017 (69th) | Shameless | | Eddie Perez | Showtime |
| 2017 (69th) | Angie Tribeca | | Erik Solky | TBS |
| 2017 (69th) | Brooklyn Nine-Nine | | Norman Howell | Fox |
| 2017 (69th) | Saturday Night Live | | Brian Smyj | NBC |
| 2017 (69th) | Unbreakable Kimmy Schmidt | | Jill Brown | Netflix |
| 2017 (69th) | Outstanding Stunt Coordination for a Drama Series, Limited Series or Movie | | | |
| 2017 (69th) | Marvel's Luke Cage | | James Lew | Netflix |
| 2017 (69th) | The Blacklist | | Cort Hessler | NBC |
| 2017 (69th) | Blindspot | | Christopher Place | NBC |
| 2017 (69th) | Gotham | | Norman Douglass | Fox |
| 2017 (69th) | MacGyver | | Jeff Wolfe | CBS |
| 2018 (70th) | Outstanding Stunt Coordination for a Comedy Series or Variety Program | | | |
| 2018 (70th) | GLOW | | Shauna Duggins | Netflix |
| 2018 (70th) | Brooklyn Nine-Nine | | Norman Howell | Fox |
| 2018 (70th) | Cobra Kai | | Hiro Koda | YouTube |
| 2018 (70th) | Saturday Night Live | | Brian Smyj | NBC |
| 2018 (70th) | Shameless | | Eddie Perez | Showtime |
| 2018 (70th) | Outstanding Stunt Coordination for a Drama Series, Limited Series or Movie | | | |
| 2018 (70th) | Game of Thrones | | Rowley Irlam | HBO |
| 2018 (70th) | The Blacklist | | Cort Hessler | NBC |
| 2018 (70th) | Blindspot | | Christopher Place | NBC |
| 2018 (70th) | Marvel's The Punisher | | Thom Williams | Netflix |
| 2018 (70th) | Westworld | | Doug Coleman and Brian Machleit | HBO |
| 2019 (71st) | Outstanding Stunt Coordination for a Comedy Series or Variety Program | | | |
| 2019 (71st) | GLOW | | Shauna Duggins | Netflix |
| 2019 (71st) | Barry | | Wade Allen | HBO |
| 2019 (71st) | Cobra Kai | | Hiro Koda and Jahnel Curfman | YouTube |
| 2019 (71st) | Russian Doll | | Christopher Place | Netflix |
| 2019 (71st) | The Tick | | Chris Cenatiempo | Amazon |
| 2019 (71st) | Outstanding Stunt Coordination for a Drama Series, Limited Series or Movie | | | |
| 2019 (71st) | Game of Thrones | | Rowley Irlam | HBO |
| 2019 (71st) | The Blacklist | | Cort Hessler | NBC |
| 2019 (71st) | Blindspot | | Christopher Place | NBC |
| 2019 (71st) | SEAL Team | | Peewee Piemonte and Julie Michaels | CBS |
| 2019 (71st) | S.W.A.T. | | Charlie Brewer | CBS |

=== 2020s ===
| Year | Program | Nominee | Network |
|---|---|---|---|
| 2020 (72nd) | Outstanding Stunt Coordination for a Comedy Series or Variety Program | | |
| 2020 (72nd) | Shameless | Eddie Perez | Showtime |
| 2020 (72nd) | Ballers | Jeff Barnett | HBO |
| 2020 (72nd) | Brooklyn Nine-Nine | Norman Howell | NBC |
| 2020 (72nd) | Henry Danger | Vince Deadrick Jr. | Nickelodeon |
| 2020 (72nd) | Space Force | Erik Solky | Netflix |
| 2020 (72nd) | Outstanding Stunt Coordination for a Drama Series, Limited Series or Movie | | |
| 2020 (72nd) | The Mandalorian | Ryan Watson | Disney+ |
| 2020 (72nd) | The Blacklist | Cort Hessler | NBC |
| 2020 (72nd) | The Rookie | David Rowden Sr. | ABC |
| 2020 (72nd) | Stranger Things | Hiro Koda | Netflix |
| 2020 (72nd) | S.W.A.T. | Austen Brewer and Charlie Brewer | CBS |
| 2021 (73rd) | Outstanding Stunt Coordination | | |
| 2021 (73rd) | The Mandalorian | Ryan Watson | Disney+ |
| 2021 (73rd) | Doom Patrol | Thom Williams | HBO Max |
| 2021 (73rd) | The Falcon and the Winter Soldier | Hank Amos and Dave Macomber | Disney+ |
| 2021 (73rd) | S.W.A.T. | Austen Brewer and Charlie Brewer | CBS |
| 2021 (73rd) | Warrior | Brett Chan | HBO Max |
| 2022 (74th) | Outstanding Stunt Coordination for a Comedy Series or Variety Program | | |
| 2022 (74th) | Barry | Wade Allen | HBO |
| 2022 (74th) | Cobra Kai | Ken Barefield | Netflix |
| 2022 (74th) | Hawkeye | Heidi Moneymaker and Noon Orsatti | Disney+ |
| 2022 (74th) | Peacemaker | Wayne Dalglish and Gaston Morrison | HBO Max |
| 2022 (74th) | The Righteous Gemstones | John Copeman | HBO |
| 2022 (74th) | What We Do in the Shadows | Tig Fong and JF Lachapelle | FX |
| 2022 (74th) | Outstanding Stunt Coordination for a Drama Series, Limited or Anthology Series or Movie | | |
| 2022 (74th) | Stranger Things | Hiro Koda | Netflix |
| 2022 (74th) | The Blacklist | Cort Hessler | NBC |
| 2022 (74th) | The Book of Boba Fett | JJ Dashnaw | Disney+ |
| 2022 (74th) | Moon Knight | Olivier Schneider and Yves Girard | Disney+ |
| 2022 (74th) | 9-1-1: Lone Star | Buddy Sosthand | Fox |
| 2022 (74th) | The Witcher | Adam Horton | Netflix |
| 2023 (75th) | Outstanding Stunt Coordination for a Comedy Series or Variety Program | | |
| 2023 (75th) | Barry | Wade Allen | HBO |
| 2023 (75th) | Cobra Kai | Ken Barefield | Netflix |
| 2023 (75th) | Poker Face | Thomas Place | Peacock |
| 2023 (75th) | Tulsa King | Freddie Poole | Paramount+ |
| 2023 (75th) | Wednesday | Brett Chan and Jason Ng | Netflix |
| 2023 (75th) | Outstanding Stunt Coordination for a Drama Series, Limited or Anthology Series or Movie | | |
| 2023 (75th) | The Boys | John Koyama | Prime Video |
| 2023 (75th) | FBI: Most Wanted | Declan Mulvey | CBS |
| 2023 (75th) | The Mandalorian | JJ Dashnaw | Disney+ |
| 2023 (75th) | The Rookie | David Scott Rowden Sr. | ABC |
| 2023 (75th) | S.W.A.T. | Austen Brewer and Lance Gilbert | CBS |
| 2024 (76th) | Outstanding Stunt Coordination for Comedy Programming | | |
| 2024 (76th) | The Gentlemen | Mark Mottram | Netflix |
| 2024 (76th) | The Brothers Sun | Justin Yu | Netflix |
| 2024 (76th) | The Righteous Gemstones | Cory DeMeyers | HBO |
| 2024 (76th) | Twisted Metal | Clay Cullen | Peacock |
| 2024 (76th) | What We Do in the Shadows | Tig Fong and JF Lachapelle | FX |
| 2024 (76th) | Outstanding Stunt Coordination for Drama Programming | | |
| 2024 (76th) | Mr. & Mrs. Smith | Stephen Pope | Prime Video |
| 2024 (76th) | Fallout | Casey O'Neill | Prime Video |
| 2024 (76th) | FBI: Most Wanted | Declan Mulvey | CBS |
| 2024 (76th) | The Rookie | David Scott Rowden Sr. | ABC |
| 2024 (76th) | Warrior | Brett Chan and Johnny Yang | Max |
| 2025 (77th) | Outstanding Stunt Coordination for Comedy Programming | | |
| 2025 (77th) | The Righteous Gemstones | Cory DeMeyers | HBO |
| 2025 (77th) | Cobra Kai | Ken Barefield | Netflix |
| 2025 (77th) | Only Murders in the Building | Chris Barnes | Hulu |
| 2025 (77th) | Poker Face | Thomas Place | Peacock |
| 2025 (77th) | Tulsa King | Freddie Poole | Paramount+ |
| 2025 (77th) | Outstanding Stunt Coordination for Drama Programming | | |
| 2025 (77th) | The Boys | John Koyama | Prime Video |
| 2025 (77th) | FBI: Most Wanted | Declan Mulvey and Nitasha Bhambree | CBS |
| 2025 (77th) | Lioness | Wade Allen | Paramount+ |
| 2025 (77th) | The Penguin | Stephen Pope | HBO |
| 2025 (77th) | The Rookie | David Rowden Sr. | ABC |
| 2026 (78th) | Outstanding Stunt Coordination for Comedy Programming | | |
| 2026 (78th) | Spider-Noir | Freddy Bouciegues and Hugh Aodh O'Brien | MGM+ / Prime Video |
| 2026 (78th) | Beef | Shauna Duggins and Chris O'Hara | Netflix |
| 2026 (78th) | Palm Royale | Mallory Thompson | Apple TV |
| 2026 (78th) | Peacemaker | Hank Amos and Dave Macomber | HBO Max |
| 2026 (78th) | Poker Face | Tom Place | Peacock |
| 2026 (78th) | Tulsa King | Freddie Poole | Paramount+ |
| 2026 (78th) | Outstanding Stunt Coordination for Drama Programming | | |
| 2026 (78th) | The Boys | John Koyama | Prime Video |
| 2026 (78th) | Fallout | Casey O'Neill and Josh Kemble | Prime Video |
| 2026 (78th) | FBI | Victor Paguia | CBS |
| 2026 (78th) | The Rookie | David Rowden Sr. | ABC |
| 2026 (78th) | Stranger Things | Hiro Koda and Jahnel Curfman | Netflix |

== Programs with multiple awards ==
4 wins

- Game of Thrones

3 wins

- The Boys
- Shameless

2 wins

- Barry
- Brooklyn Nine-Nine
- Chuck
- GLOW
- The Mandalorian
- Southland
- 24

== Programs with multiple nominations ==
8 nominations

- The Blacklist

7 nominations

- 24

6 nominations

- Brooklyn Nine-Nine
- Game of Thrones

5 nominations

- Alias
- Cobra Kai
- The Rookie
- Shameless

4 nominations

- Saturday Night Live
- S.W.A.T.

3 nominations

- Barry
- Blindspot
- The Boys
- Chuck
- Criminal Minds
- FBI: Most Wanted
- Hawaii Five-0
- It's Always Sunny in Philadelphia
- The Mandalorian
- Poker Face
- The Righteous Gemstones
- Southland
- Stranger Things
- Third Watch
- Tulsa King

2 nominations

- Angie Tribeca
- Community
- CSI: NY
- ER
- Fallout
- GLOW
- Gotham
- Grimm
- NCIS
- Peacemaker
- Revolution
- Unbreakable Kimmy Schmidt
- Warrior
- What We Do in the Shadows

== Individuals with multiple awards ==
4 wins

- Rowley Irlam

3 wins

- Eddie Perez
- John Koyama

2 wins

- Wade Allen
- Shauna Duggins
- Norman Howell
- Hiro Koda
- Peewee Piemonte
- Ryan Watson
- Merritt Yohnka

== Individuals with multiple nominations ==
13 nominations

- Cort Hessler

9 nominations

- Norman Howell

8 nominations

- Hiro Koda

7 nominations

- Jeff Cadiente

5 nominations

- Christopher Place

4 nominations

- Wade Allen
- Shauna Duggins
- Jeff Habberstad
- Rowley Irlam
- Eddie Perez
- Peewee Piemonte
- David Scott Rowden Sr.
- Jim Vickers
- Jeff Wolfe

3 nominations

- Ken Barefield
- Austen Brewer
- Charlie Brewer
- Brett Chan
- Vince Deadrick Jr.
- Tom Elliott
- John Koyama
- Declan Mulvey
- Casey O'Neill
- Thomas Place
- Freddie Poole
- David Rowden Sr.
- Marc Scizak
- Brian Smyj
- Erik Solky
- Matt Taylor
- Merritt Yohnka

2 nominations

- Hank Amos
- Jill Brown
- Jahnel Curfman
- JJ Dashnaw
- Cory DeMeyers
- Norman Douglass
- Diamond Farnsworth
- Tig Fong
- JF Lachapelle
- Dave Macomber
- Artie Malesci
- Julie Michaels
- Stephen Pope
- Ryan Watson
- Thom Williams
