= John Koyama =

American actor, assistant director and stuntman

- Born: February 3, 1973 (age 53)
- Occupations: Actor, assistant director, stuntman
- Years active: 1991–present

John Koyama (born February 3, 1973) is an American actor, assistant director and stuntman. He won three Primetime Emmy Awards in the category Outstanding Stunt Coordination for his work on the television program The Boys.

In addition to his Primetime Emmy Awards wins, he played the recurring role of Jesse Pinkman's former meth partner Emilio in the first season of the AMC neo-western crime drama television series Breaking Bad. He guest-starred in television programs including Grey's Anatomy, Alias, Better Call Saul and The Game, and also in films such as Escape from L.A., The Time Machine, Furious 7, The Last Samurai and City of Industry.
