= Hiro Koda =

American assistant director and stuntman

- Occupations: Assistant director, stuntman
- Years active: 1992–present

Hiro Koda is an American assistant director and stuntman. He won two Primetime Emmy Awards and was nominated for six more in the category Outstanding Stunt Coordination for his work on the television programs Supah Ninjas, True Blood, K.C. Undercover, Cobra Kai and Stranger Things.
