= Eddie Perez (stunt coordinator) =

American director, stunt coordinator and actor

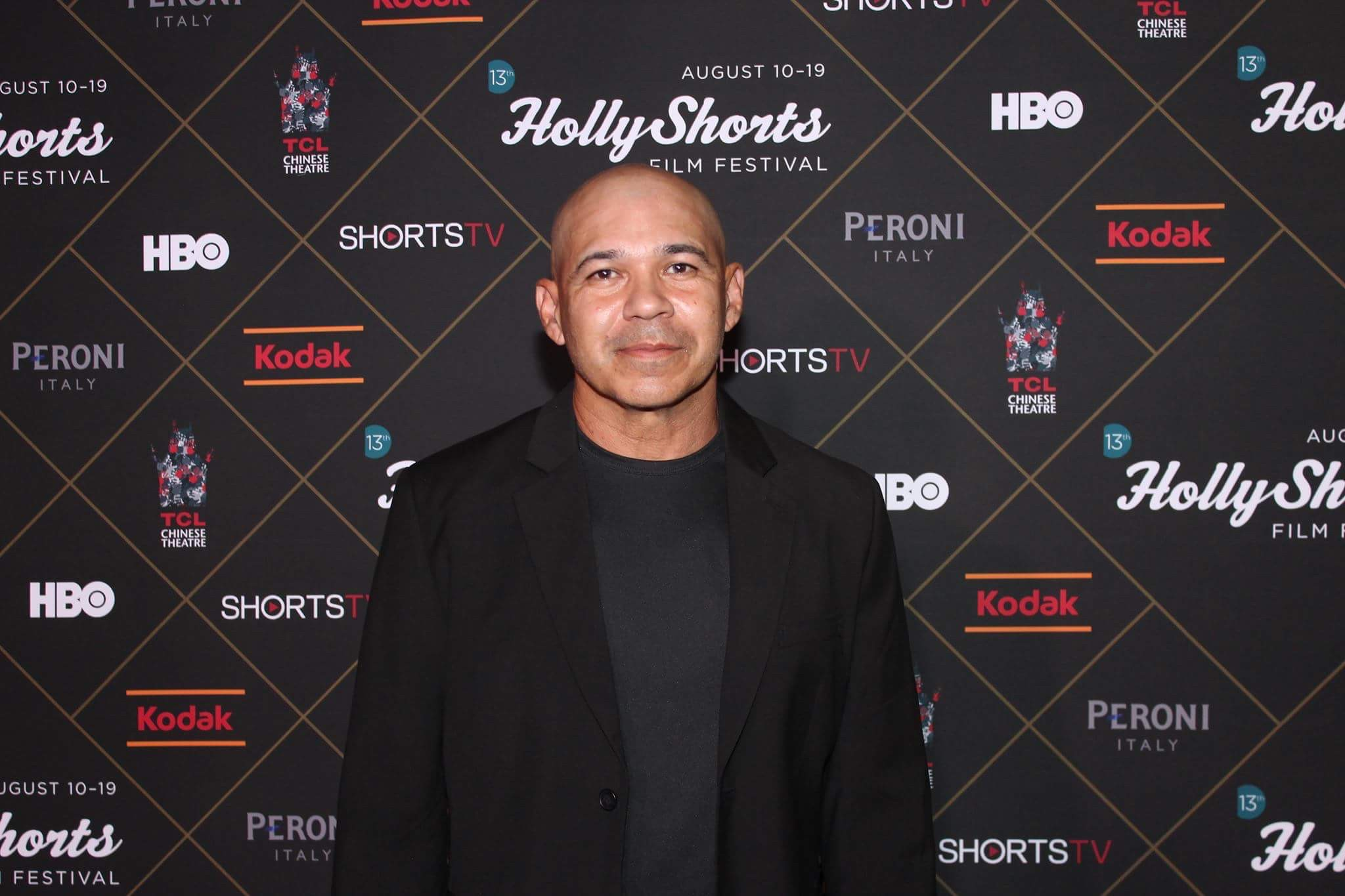
- Born: New York City, New York, U.S.
- Occupation(s): Director, stunt coordinator, actor
- Years active: 1989–present

Eddie Perez is an American director, stunt coordinator and actor. He is a three-time Primetime Emmy Award winner for Shameless.

== Life and career ==
Eddie was born in New York City, New York. He graduated from Long Island University, had worked as a doorman in New York City, and then moved to Los Angeles to work as a personal trainer for Mickey Rourke and Anthony Michael Hall. He worked as a bodyguard for Duran Duran, Sylvester Stallone, and Sandra Bullock. Later, he studied acting with Peter Flood and stunts with Paul Stader. He was the second unit director and stunt coordinator in the films such as Blade and Shoot 'Em Up.

Eddie has stunt coordinated Shameless for 9 seasons. In 2015, he directed the short film, The Test of Time. His notable acting works include Westworld, Once Upon a Time in Hollywood, Deadpool, Sicario, and Jack Reacher.

== Selected filmography ==
Year	Title	Contribution	Note
2015	The Test of Time	Director, writer, and producer	Short film

As stunt coordinator

- 2022 – Daisy Jones & The Six
- 2022 – Promised Land
- 2019-2022 – Snowfall
- 2013-2021 – Shameless
- 2019 – Zeroville
- 2019 – Perpetual Grace, LTD
- 2017 – Rhett & Link's Buddy System
- 2016 – So B. It
- 2015 – Hardcore Henry
- 2014 – Blood Ransom
- 2013 – Masters of Sex
- 2013 – Max Rose
- 2011 – Chemistry
- 2011 – In Plain Sight
- 2008 – Sex Drive
- 2008 – While She Was Out
- 2007 – Shoot 'Em Up
- 2006 – Idiocracy
- 2005-2006 – Threshold
- 2004-2006 – Phil of the Future
- 2004 – Blade: Trinity
- 1999-2004 – The Jersey
- 2003 – The League of Extraordinary Gentlemen
- 2002 – Curb Your Enthusiasm
- 2002 – 100 Deeds for Eddie McDowd
- 2002 – Zig Zag
- 2002 – Crossroads
- 2001 – Human Nature
- 2001 – Special Unit 2
- 2000 – Mexico City
- 2000 – Just Deal
- 1999 – Forever Fabulous
- 1998 – Permanent Midnight
- 1997 – Hugo Pool
- 1997 – American Perfekt
- 1994 – Hail Caesar
- 1993 – Mi Vida Loca

== Awards and nominations ==
Year	Result	Award	Category	Work	Ref.
2020	Won	Primetime Emmy Awards	Outstanding Stunt Coordination for a Comedy Series or Variety Program	Shameless	
2018	Nominated	Primetime Emmy Awards	Outstanding Stunt Coordination for a Comedy Series or Variety Program	Shameless	
2017	Won	Primetime Emmy Awards	Outstanding Stunt Coordination for a Comedy Series or Variety Program	Shameless	
2016	Won	Primetime Emmy Awards	Outstanding Stunt Coordination for a Comedy Series or Variety Program	Shameless	
2015	Nominated	Catalina Film Festival	Best Short	The Test of Time	
2010	Won	Screen Actors Guild Awards	Outstanding Performance by a Stunt Ensemble in a Motion Picture	Star Trek	
