= The Augments =

- Star Trek: Enterprise episode
- Episode no.: Season 4 Episode 6
- Directed by: LeVar Burton
- Written by: Michael Sussman
- Production code: 406
- Original air date: November 12, 2004

Guest appearances
- Brent Spiner as Doctor Arik Soong; Alec Newman as Malik; Abby Brammell as Persis; Richard Riehle as Doctor Jeremy Lucas; Mark Rolston as Captain Magh; Adam Grimes as Lokesh

Episode chronology
← Previous "Cold Station 12"	Next → "The Forge"
- Star Trek: Enterprise season 4

"The Augments" is the sixth episode of the fourth season of the American science fiction television series Star Trek: Enterprise, the eighty-second episode overall. It is the last of a three-story episode arc, preceded by "Borderland", and "Cold Station 12". "The Augments" was directed by LeVar Burton, from a script by Michael Sussman.

The series follows the adventures of the first Starfleet starship Enterprise, Starfleet registration number NX-01. In this episode, "Augments", genetically enhanced humans, and Doctor Arik Soong, their surrogate father, escape Cold Station 12 after stealing frozen Augment embryos from storage. Soong plans to hide out with the Augments and raise the embryos, but Malik, their leader, is tired of hiding and attempts to instigate a war between Starfleet and the Klingons.

The production of the episode reunites fellow Star Trek: The Next Generation alumni Burton as the director and Brent Spiner as Arik Soong. On The Next Generation, Burton previously played Geordi La Forge, while Spiner played Data. Most of the guest cast from the previous two Enterprise episodes in the story arc returned for "The Augments"; Mark Rolston makes an appearance as Klingon Captain Magh. The sets were also reused, but a new one was built for the Klingon escape pod used by Soong. UPN first aired "The Augments" on November 12, 2004, where it was watched by 2.1 percent of the U.S. population. It received mixed reviews from critics, who spoke negatively of Malik's character, but praised the performance of Spiner as Soong and the relationship between T'Pol and Tucker.

== Plot ==
At the end of "Cold Station 12", Doctor Arik Soong and the Augments he secretly raised depart the space station, taking with them 1,800 frozen Augment embryos preserved from the time of the Eugenics Wars. Malik also steals pathogen samples from the station and sets the containment fields to fail. In "The Augments", Captain Archer restores stasis around the central compound, and is beamed from space to safety. He takes the Enterprise in pursuit of Soong, Malik, and the Augments in their stolen Bird of Prey.

Soong and the Augments arrive in Klingon space where he shares his plan: Soong intends to hide out in a region (the Briar Patch) where Starfleet would have trouble tracking them down. Malik objects to Soong's plan, noting that Khan Noonien Singh also ran away on the SS Botany Bay.

In pursuit of the Augments Enterprise arrives in Klingon space, having faked a Klingon warp signature. Soong releases a hostage on a Denobulan shuttle into a gas giant, forcing Enterprise to abandon the pursuit and mount a rescue operation. Escaping, Malik proposes a new plan: trigger a war between Starfleet and the Klingons as a distraction by firing a pathogen-filled torpedo at a Klingon colony. He reasons that Starfleet will be too busy fighting the Klingons to hunt down the Augments. Soong will have nothing to do with Malik's genocidal proposal.

On the Enterprise, Commander T'Pol asks Commander Tucker about the distance between them after her recent arranged marriage. He tells her he has come to terms with their new relationship.

Back on the Bird of Prey, Soong works on a way to remove aggressive behavior from the unborn Augment embryos. Malik, concerned by Soong's plan to hide from Starfleet and his tampering with the embryos, leads a mutiny which confines Soong to his quarters. With the help of Persis, Soong leaves the ship in an escape pod. Enterprise, once again in pursuit, detects the pod and brings Soong on board. Heading towards the Klingon colony at high warp in an attempt to stop Malik's plan, the Klingons detect their ship. Enterprise is forced to disable a Klingon cruiser when it tries to board. Malik kills Persis for her betrayal, and continues with his plan to attack the Klingons. Scans of the Qu'vat colony reveal three main population centers; the torpedo is armed with pathogens and prepared for deployment.

The Enterprise arrives at the Qu'vat colony just after Malik fires the torpedo, but Enterprise destroys it, saving the population. Soong helps disable the Klingon ship, hoping to save some of the Augments. However, Malik scuttles the Klingon ship, killing the remaining Augments and the embryos; and transports himself onto Enterprise in an attempt to kill Soong in revenge. Archer manages to kill Malik first, blowing a hole clear through him. The Klingons call off their retaliation against Earth, and Soong is returned to the Starfleet Detention Center. In custody, he begins to doubt the feasibility of genetically engineering humans; and wonders if perfecting artificial life holds better possibilities for the future.

== Production ==
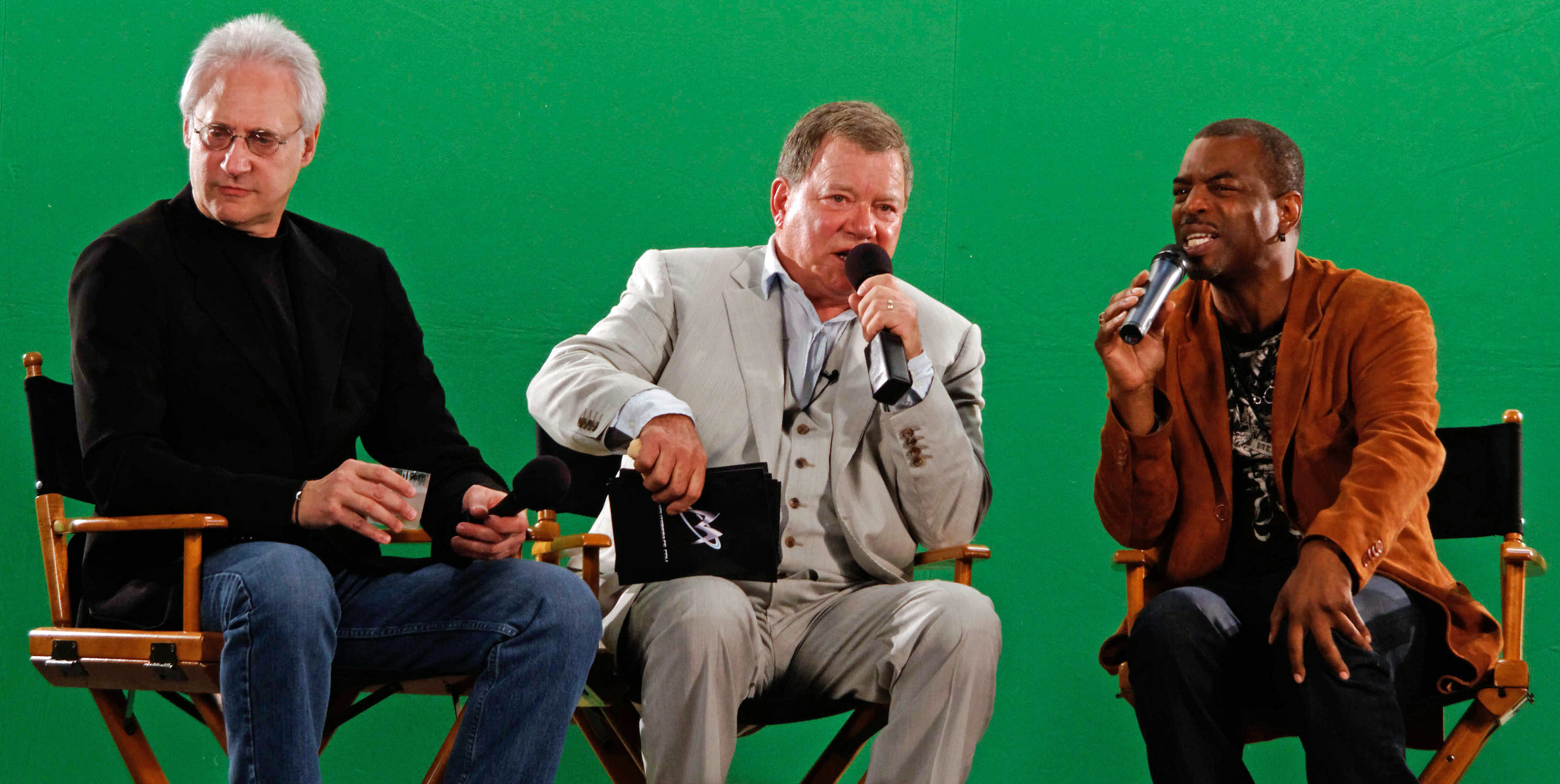
From left; Brent Spiner, William Shatner and LeVar Burton

"The Augments" is the final episode in a three-part story which began with "Borderland" and continued in "Cold Station 12". The return of genetically enhanced humans, as seen in the Star Trek: The Original Series episode "Space Seed" and Star Trek II: The Wrath of Khan, links Enterprise to The Original Series.

The episode reunites Brent Spiner and LeVar Burton, two Star Trek: The Next Generation alumni. Spiner played the role of the android Data and Burton played chief engineer Geordi La Forge. Spiner appeared in all instalments of the three-story arc, while Burton only directed "The Augments". Burton directed three episodes of Enterprise in the third season. To celebrate their collaboration, as well as acknowledge the crew members who had remained with the franchise since their series, Burton bought lunch on the final day of shooting for everyone on the set. The episode was written by Mike Sussman, his second of the season after "Home".

Shooting began on September 2 and lasted for seven days, with the production taking time off for Labor Day. The majority of the sets on the episode were created for "Borderland" or "Cold Station 12". The scene depicting a Klingon escape pod required the construction of a new set. Spiner, as well as several other guest stars, resumed their roles from earlier in the story arc, including Alec Newman as Malik, Richard Riehle as Doctor Jeremy Lucas, Abby Brammell as Persis and Adam Grimes as Lokesh. Joining them was Mark Rolston as the Klingon Captain Magh; Rolston previously appeared in The Next Generation as Walter Pierce in the episode "Eye of the Beholder", and also played Kuroda in the Enterprise episode "Canamar".

== Reception ==
UPN first broadcast "The Augments" on November 12, 2004. According to overnight Nielsen ratings, 2.1 percent of the population of the United States and four percent of those watching television at the time viewed the episode. "The Augments" received the same ratings as the previous episode, "Cold Station 12". However, it moved up to fourth place in the 8 p.m. timeslot, narrowly beating What I Like About You and Grounded for Life on The WB.

IGN gave the episode 3.5 out of five, and wrote: "The Augments doesn't deliver as strongly as I'd have hoped, it is still an engaging hour of television that clearly shows Enterprise is going in a new direction." Michelle Erica Green of TrekNation, said that Malik had become a "cardboard villain" by the time of "The Augments", but she did not blame Alec Newman for this. She also criticised the use of Persis' death by Malik, saying that he defined her "even in death as a commodity for his use". Green praised the relationship between T'Pol and Tucker and the characterisation of Soong, noting that Spiner's performance was the best of the three-episode arc.

Writing for Jammer's Reviews, Jamahl Epsicokhan gave the episode a rating of two out of four. He criticised Malik, noting that the "crux of the story is reduced to an unremarkable three-character power struggle that is supposed to be a microcosm for the trouble that comes with genetically engineered super-humans, but comes across instead as overly bland and tidy drama." Spiner "delivers a good performance under the circumstances", notes Epsicokhan, as his character has to believe that Malik will not overthrow his leadership of the Augments. Summing up the episode, Epsicokhan writes:

Perhaps this story was simply content to show absolute power corrupting absolutely. Unfortunately, aside from Persis, none of the Augments stop to think about what they're doing or why, and the story of Malik is content to blandly repeat the story of Khan, but without the crucial personal motivator of revenge. I think the writers owed the material more than this.

In a review for Big Shiny Robot, Andy Wilson said that the story represented the "personal journey" of Arik Soong from genetic engineering to cybernetics. (Note: Arik Soong was the great-grandfather of Noonien Soong, creator of a number of androids including Data, a main character in The Next Generation and subsequent films.) Screen Rant praised casting Brent Spiner as the character Arik Soong.

The Hollywood Reporter interviewed various cast and production crew of the Star Trek franchise to determine the "100 Greatest Episodes" from across the five series, ranking "Borderland"/"Cold Station 12"/"The Augments" as the 96th best episode of all time. Den of Geek writer James Hunt ranked the mini-arc as the sixth best story of Enterprise.

== Home media release ==
A home media release of "The Augments" was originally released in the United States on November 1, 2005, as part of the season four DVD box set of Enterprise. The Blu-ray edition was released on April 1, 2014.

== See also ==
- Genetic engineering in science fiction
