= Wade Allen =

American assistant director and stuntman

- Born: April 12, 1972 (age 54)
- Occupations: Assistant director, stuntman
- Spouse: Annabeth Gish (m. 2003)
- Children: 2

Wade Allen (born April 12, 1972) is an American assistant director and stuntman. He won two Primetime Emmy Awards and was nominated for another one in the category Outstanding Stunt Coordination for his work on the television program Barry.
