= Cold Station 12 =

- Star Trek: Enterprise episode
- Episode no.: Season 4 Episode 5
- Directed by: Mike Vejar
- Written by: Alan Brennert
- Production code: 405
- Original air date: November 5, 2004

Guest appearances
- Brent Spiner - Doctor Arik Soong; Alec Newman - Malik; Abby Brammell - Persis; Richard Riehle - Doctor Jeremy Lucas; Kaj-Erik Eriksen - Smike; Kris Iyer - Deputy Director; Adam Grimes - Lokesh

Episode chronology
← Previous "Borderland"	Next → "The Augments"
- Star Trek: Enterprise season 4

"Cold Station 12" is the fifth episode of the fourth season of the American science fiction television series Star Trek: Enterprise, the eighty-first episode overall. It was directed by Mike Vejar from a script by Alan Brennert, and aired on November 5, 2004, on UPN. It comprises the middle-act of a three-episode arc, preceded by "Borderland" and followed by "The Augments".

The series follows the adventures of the first Starfleet starship Enterprise, registration NX-01. In this episode, after leaving Enterprise stranded, Doctor Arik Soong and his Augments travel to "Cold Station 12", a secretive pathogen and bio-medical facility run by Starfleet Medical and the Denobulans, where much of this episode's plot unfolds. Once inside, they begin torturing the scientists with the goal of retrieving some 1,800 augmented embryos, allowing them to expand their race.

The production team created several new sets to represent the space station itself, as well as re-using some from "Borderland" to represent the Klingon starship. The make-up team were required to make Brent Spiner look younger for flashbacks and to show the progression of a character's exposure to a number of pathogens. The story-arc has been considered one of the best seen in Enterprise, and critics praised "Cold Station 12", specifically for the special effects and character development, but felt that the death scene crossed the line. On first broadcast, the episode was watched by 2.1 percent of the population according to Nielsen ratings, placing it in fifth position for the timeslot.

== Plot ==
After the escape of Doctor Soong and the Augments, Captain Archer and his crew proceed to the coordinates Soong had provided earlier in the mission. On Trialis IV, the away team find an abandoned building where the young Augments were raised and schooled by "father" Soong. They also capture a banished member of the Augments named Udar. Nicknamed "Smike" by his Augment siblings after a handicapped character from the comic novel Nicholas Nickleby by Charles Dickens, he is taken to Enterprise. Analysis reveals that although Udar's DNA is similar to the other Augments, Smike has none of their enhanced abilities, apart from superior hearing.

Meanwhile, Soong and the Augments capture Barzai, a Denobulan medical ship, and use it to enter the medical facility called Cold Station 12 (C-12). They soon overpower security and capture the scientists there, including its chief medical officer, Doctor Jeremy Lucas, Doctor Phlox's former Interspecies Medical Exchange counterpart and friend. Due to security protocols, tensions begin to surface between Soong and Malik as to how to coerce Lucas into divulging the entry codes. Malik convinces Soong to torture Lucas, failing that, to expose another scientist to a deadly pathogen using a containment chamber.

Enterprise approaches within transporter range, and beams a landing party, including Phlox to the facility. They are soon detected, however, and imprisoned with the facility's staff. Meanwhile, Commander T'Pol, having lost contact with the team, attempts to destroy the station, but the Klingon ship intervenes. Malik uses Phlox's friendship to finally coerce the security codes from Lucas (by threatening to expose him to a pathogen as well). Soong, who had previously stolen 19 genetically enhanced and frozen embryos from C-12, is now able to access the remaining 1,800, a carry-over from the Eugenics Wars. Soong and the Augments then escape, but not before Malik kills Smike, helps himself to a number of pathogen samples, and sets the viral containment fields to fail.

== Production ==
The episode was the second of a three-part storyline, which was intended to link Enterprise more closely to Star Trek: The Original Series with the return of genetically engineered "Augments" which had appeared alongside Khan Noonian Singh in "Space Seed" and the movie Star Trek II: The Wrath of Khan. It was preceded by the episode "Borderland", and followed by "The Augments". Production on the episode began on August 24, 2004, and concluded on September 1. There were several swing sets created for the episode, specifically to cover the scenes filmed on board the station. It re-used the sets created for "Borderland" to represent the Klingon vessel captured by the Augments. There were also sets created to represent the compound where Soong raised the genetically altered humans, which was set up different as flashbacks to the character's childhoods were also shot for this episode. It was directed by Mike Vejar, who had directed several earlier episodes of Star Trek, most recently "Stratagem". It was written by Consulting Producer Alan Brennert, his first writing credit in the franchise.

There was some specific work required by the make-up department on Brent Spiner as during those flashbacks he was made to look younger which the team created by dying his hair darker and applying more youthful make-up. Also, the team added several different appliances to Kris Iyer to show his character go through a series of levels of infection of a number of diseases at the hands of Soong. These included colored contact lenses, prosthetics to make his veins appear to pulse and gel was added to his eyes to make them bloodshot.

There were several guest actors in "Cold Station 12". The character, Dr. Jeremy Lucas, had been previously mentioned in the episodes "Dear Doctor" and "Doctor's Orders" as a friend of Phlox. But "Cold Station 12" marked the first occasion that the character appeared on screen, played by Richard Riehle. The actor had previously appeared in the Star Trek: The Next Generation episode "The Inner Light" as well as the Star Trek: Voyager episodes "Fair Haven" and the follow-up episode "Spirit Folk". Guest stars Spiner, Alec Newman and Abby Brammell resumed their roles from the previous episode in the trilogy, "Borderland".

== Reception ==
"Cold Station 12" was first broadcast on November 5, 2004, on UPN. According to Nielsen ratings, it was watched by 2.1 percent of the population of the United States and by four percent of those watching television at the time. This put it in fifth place for the 8pm timeslot, behind Totally Outrageous Behavior and World's Craziest Videos on Fox. It had an average of 3.4 million viewers. Brent Spiner was credited for the ratings boost, the best of season so far.

Bill Gordon, writing for the website Sci-Fi Pulse, said that it was a "nearly flawless episode", with his one critique in his analysis of the plot being targeted at Captain Archer telling Soong that they were sending over the self-destruct code for the station. He said that there was an "epic" quality to "Cold Station 12" that made him compare it to the Star Trek film franchise, saying that it had "stellar FX shots, to first class character and story development, to a quality of writing that has been sadly lacking in the Star Trek universe of late."

IGN gave the episode two out of five, and saying that it "lacks some of the flair of its predecessor and seems to take some storytelling shortcuts to get where it's going, making it feel more like the usual Enterprise episode rather than something special", but hopes that the next episode will be able to deliver on the promise of the arc's ambitious premise. Michelle Erica Green of TrekNation praised the episode, saying it was an improvement on "Borderland" and that Spiner was even better. But she found the murder of the doctor shocking and felt that it had gone too far. She said that themes raised in "Cold Station 12" mirrored those which could have appeared on The Original Series, but that this episode didn't take the time to discuss them. She hoped that the final episode of the trilogy would cover that ground. Aint It Cool News gave it three out of five.

The mini-arc featuring the episodes "Borderland", "Cold Station 12" and "The Augments" were ranked the sixth best story of Enterprise by Den of Geek writer James Hunt. Screen Rant praised casting Brent Spiner as the character Arik Soong.

The University of Dubuque included viewing of "Cold Station 12" alongside the Doctor Who episode "The Beast Below" in the course "Captain Picard Meets Dr. Who" to demonstrate the idea of sacrificing one person to save many.

=== Awards ===
Alongside his work on the previous episode "Borderland", Vince Deadrick, Jr.'s work on "Cold Station 12" was nominated for a Primetime Emmy Award for Outstanding Stunt Coordination. The award was won by Matt Taylor for his work on 24.

== Home media release ==
"Cold Station 12" was as part of the season the four DVD box set of Enterprise, originally released in the United States on November 1, 2005. The Blu-ray release of the fourth season of Enterprise was on April 1, 2014.
