= Borderland (Star Trek: Enterprise) =

- Star Trek: Enterprise episode
- The crew attempt a rescue from The Orion slave markets
- Episode no.: Season 4 Episode 4
- Directed by: David Livingston
- Written by: Ken LaZebnik
- Production code: 080
- Original air date: October 29, 2004

Guest appearances
- Brent Spiner – Doctor Arik Soong; Alec Newman – Malik; Abby Brammell – Persis; Joel West – Raakin; Dave Power – Ensign Jeffrey Pierce; Big Show – Orion Slaver #1; J. G. Hertzler – Klingon Captain; Bobbi Sue Luther – Orion Slave Woman

Episode chronology
← Previous "Home"	Next → "Cold Station 12"
- Star Trek: Enterprise season 4

"Borderland" is the fourth episode of the fourth season of the science fiction television series Star Trek: Enterprise. It originally aired on October 29, 2004, on UPN. The script was written by Ken LaZebnik, and was directed by David Livingston. The episode featured the first appearance of Star Trek: The Next Generation actor Brent Spiner in Enterprise. It also featured guest appearances by Bobbi Sue Luther and WWE wrestler Big Show.

The series follows the adventures of the first Starfleet starship Enterprise, registration NX-01. In this episode, genetically engineered humans called "Augments" capture a Klingon vessel, and the Enterprise is sent to find them. They retrieve the Augments' creator, Doctor Arik Soong (Brent Spiner), and head in pursuit. After being attacked by Orions and rescuing their crew members, the ship is attacked by Augments who retrieve their creator. The episode is the first of a three episode arc, followed by "Cold Station 12" and "The Augments".

The reception from critics was mixed, with Spiner's performance generally praised. The episode was nominated for a Primetime Emmy Award for Outstanding Stunt Coordination.

== Plot ==
In May 2154, a pair of genetically enhanced humans, referred to as "Augments", leave their home planet and take control of a Klingon Bird-of-Prey warship after killing the crew. Amid threats and protests by the Klingons, Starfleet tasks the newly refurbished Enterprise with stopping the culprits. Captain Archer visits disgraced scientist Doctor Arik Soong, imprisoned for stealing augmented embryos, and transfers him from a holding facility. On board, Soong soon recognises his Augments are responsible for the actions on board the Klingon vessel, but does not know why. He convinces Archer that he will be able to order his "children" to stand down without a fight.

Enterprise enters an area of space known as the "Borderland" between the territories of the Klingons and Orions. They are attacked by two Orion vessels and several crew members are captured, including T'Pol (newly granted the Starfleet rank of Commander). They are taken to a slave market and Archer is forced to ask for Soong's assistance to rescue his crew. After entering the market, the ship is able to beam most of the crew back, but when they try to release T'Pol's restraints, all of the prisoners in the slave market are released and chaos breaks out. Soong also attempts to escape, but Archer quickly returns him to Enterprise, where he demands that Soong take him immediately to the Augments. Soong refuses.

On board the Klingon vessel, it is clear that the Augments consider Soong to be their "father". In a power-play, the Augment leader, Raakin, is tricked by Persis (who had been pretending to be devoted to him) and killed by his "brother" Malik. The Bird-of-Prey approaches Enterprise, saving them from a second Orion attack. The ships dock, and Malik requests the release of Soong from the brig — Archer refuses, but Malik forces him to comply. With Enterprise disabled, Soong announces that they now need to go and retrieve the remaining thousands of Augment embryos.

== Production ==
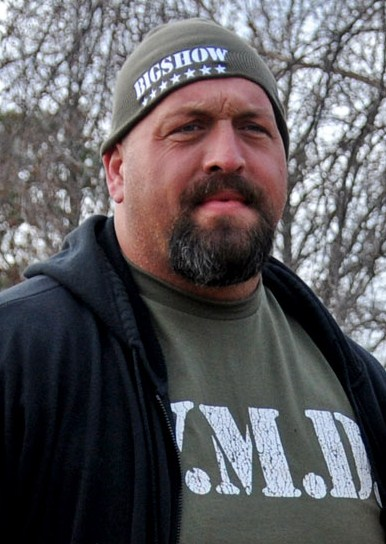
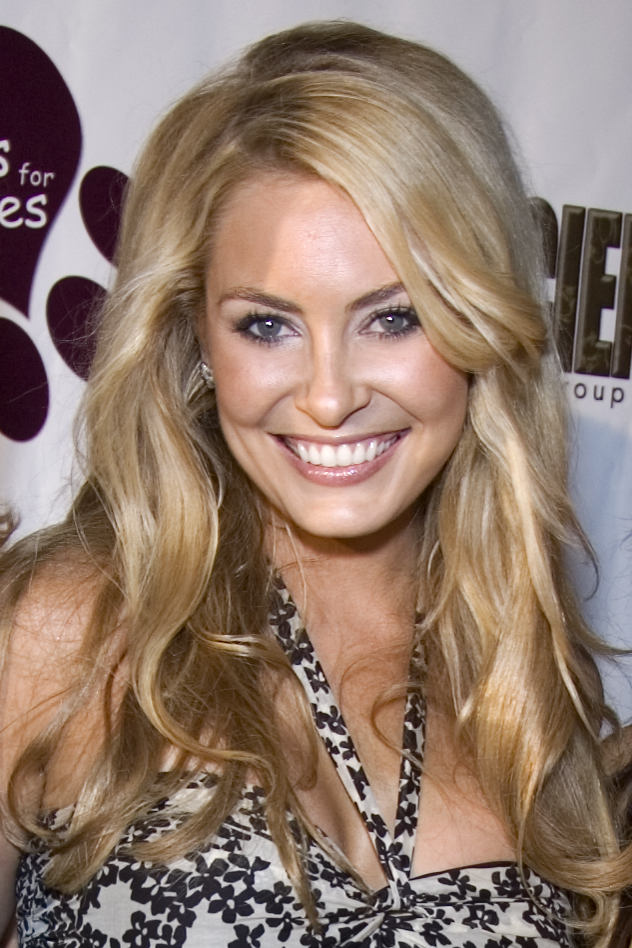
The Big Show and Bobbi Sue Luther were two of the guest actors portraying members of the Orion race in this episode

The three episode arc was an attempt to connect the events of Enterprise with The Original Series. It featured the Augments, genetically engineered humans from 20th Century Earth who had been featured previously in "Space Seed" and Star Trek II: The Wrath of Khan, both featuring Ricardo Montalbán as Khan Noonien Singh. The mini-arc which began with "Borderland" was one of several plots during season four that sought to link the series closer to The Original Series and The Next Generation due to ongoing low ratings.

It was not originally planned to include an ancestor of Noonien Soong in the episode, with executive producer Manny Coto instead planning for the character to be Colonel Phillip Green from The Original Series episode "The Savage Curtain". The character was to be a straightforward villain, but after discussion with The Next Generation actor Spiner, the character was re-written to become Arik Soong, described as a "misunderstood genius". It was Spiner's first Star Trek role since Star Trek: Nemesis in 2002, having previously played Arik Soong's descendant Noonien Soong and his creations Data and Lore in The Next Generation.

"Borderland" was the 80th episode of Enterprise, which was one more episode than the entire run of The Original Series. The episode featured the return of the Orion race, which had been featured in The Original Series episodes "The Cage" and "Whom Gods Destroy". Actors portraying Orions included Bobbi Sue Luther and WWE wrestler Big Show. Luther auditioned for the role despite being only 5'5 when the casting call insisting that actress must be at least 5'10. Luther subsequently explained that she was "familiar with the show but never really watched it", and thanked her makeup artist fiancé Robert Hall for explaining her role as an Orion slave girl to her. She researched the role on the internet after she received the script, in particular the portrayal by Susan Oliver in Star Trek's original pilot, "The Cage". It took four hours of make-up work for Luther to be ready, and she described the costume as slightly skimpier than she was used to as a lingerie and bikini model. Despite the application of isopropyl alcohol, Luther said that it took days for the remnants of the make-up to be removed. Brent Spiner poked fun at her about having to be painted and not him, after his many years of makeup as Data.

Before broadcast, it was rumoured that the character of Vice Admiral Maxwell Forrest (Vaughn Armstrong) would be killed off in the episode. His death came three episodes later in "The Forge". It was the last appearance in the Star Trek franchise by J. G. Hertzler, best known for playing Martok in Deep Space Nine. Appearing once again as a Klingon, he was allowed to choose his own costume from the prop department and decided to re-use the outfit worn by Michael Ansara as Kang in the DS9 episode "Blood Oath". Several items from the episode were sold on eBay as part of the It's A Wrap! sale and auction. These included the Orion costumes worn by Big Show and others, a unique Orion console created for the slave market, and a variety of Orion PADDs.

== Reception ==
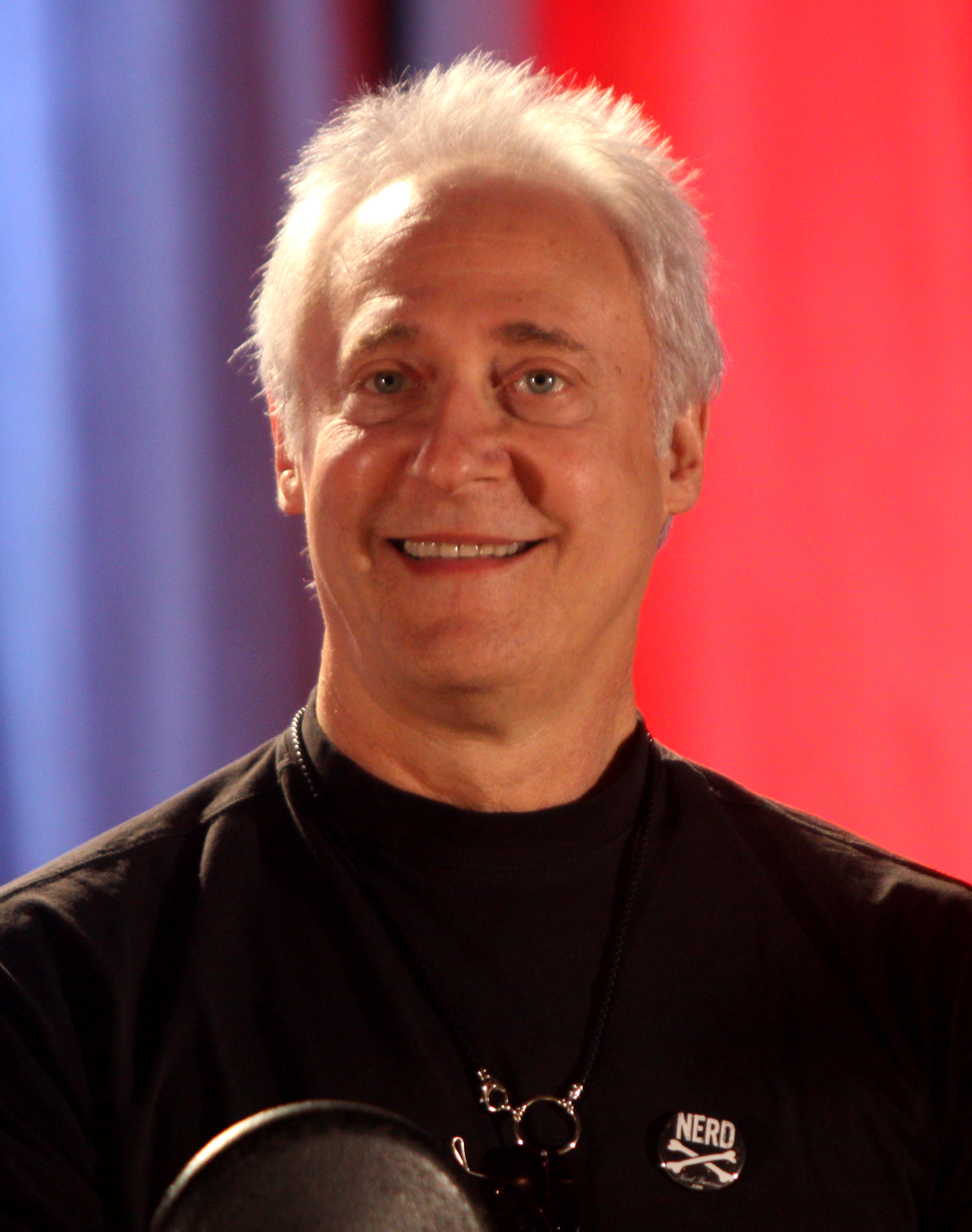
The performance of Brent Spiner in this episode was praised by critics

"Borderland" first premiered on UPN in the United States on October 29, 2004. It had ratings of 2.0/4, meaning it was seen by 2.0 percent of all households, and four percent of all those watching television at the time of broadcast.

Robert Bianco highlighted the episode as one to watch in his preview column for USA Today. Maureen Ryan for the Chicago Tribune praised the return of Brent Spiner to Star Trek, saying: "Surprise, fear, elation, self-control; they're all given masterful life by Spiner in the space of a few seconds." IGN gave it a score of three out of five, and said it was a return to the quality of "Broken Bow", and praised the abilities of Spiner. The teaser trailer was compared to that of a Quentin Tarantino film, and concluded saying: "Executive Producer Manny Coto has a long way to go if he has any hope of making up for Enterprise's transgressions the past three years but if this three episode story arc lives up to the promise shown in "Borderland", he might just pull it off." IGN reviewed the episode again when it was repeated, saying it held up, but said the rest of the arc failed live up to the promise of this episode. Stephanie Vander Weide of Television Without Pity gave the episode a "C" grade rating. She said that she liked the premise of the episode, but felt that the execution was sub-par, describing the augments as "Khannabees" and expressing her disappointment in the actions of Captain Archer.

The mini-arc, featuring the episodes "Borderland", "Cold Station 12" and "The Augments", was ranked the sixth best story of Enterprise by Den of Geek writer James Hunt. The Hollywood Reporter rated "Borderland" the 96th best episode of all Star Trek episodes. Vulture noted "Borderland" as an episode where the show "hit its stride", and praised actor Brent Spiner for his role in the episode as Arik. They also listed this episode as one of the best of the series, in their episode guide for all Star Trek series. Screen Rant praised casting Brent Spiner as the character Arik Soong.

=== Awards ===
Alongside his work on the following episode "Cold Station 12", Vince Deadrick, Jr.'s work on "Borderland" was nominated for a Primetime Emmy Award for Outstanding Stunt Coordination. It was instead awarded to Matt Taylor for his work on 24.

== Home media release ==
A home media release of the episode was on DVD; having been released as part of the season four box set on November 1, 2005 in the United States. The Blu-ray edition was released on April 1, 2014.
