= Chuck Versus the Crown Vic =

- Chuck episode
- Chuck and Sarah argue about Chuck's behavior, and the kiss.
- Episode no.: Season 1 Episode 11
- Directed by: Chris Fisher
- Written by: Zev Borow
- Production code: 3T6460
- Original air date: December 3, 2007

Guest appearances
- Bonita Friedericy as Diane Beckman; Tony Todd as Langston Graham; Michael Wiseman as Lon Kirk; Scott Krinsky as Jeff Barnes; Vik Sahay as Lester Patel; Mark Christopher Lawrence as "Big Mike" Tucker; Julia Ling as Anna Wu; Ping Wu as Mr. Wu; Yuriana Kim as Mrs. Wu

Episode chronology
← Previous "Chuck Versus the Nemesis"	Next → "Chuck Versus the Undercover Lover"

"Chuck Versus the Crown Vic" is the 11th episode of the first season of Chuck, airing on NBC on December 3, 2007. Chuck must deal with the aftermath of Bryce Larkin's departure as he goes undercover with Sarah to investigate a billionaire philanthropist. Meanwhile, Morgan meets Anna's parents.

== Plot summary ==
=== Main plot ===
Chuck escorts Lester and Jeff to do an install on a private boat owned by philanthropist Lon Kirk (Michael Wiseman) to keep the two out of trouble. However Jeff and Lester still go below deck, where they find men counting a substantial amount of money. Chuck flashes on one of the bills and realizes that it's counterfeit. Beckman begins to brief Chuck and Casey, but Sarah—who skipped work at the Wienerlicious—is absent. The two attempt to cover for her before she arrives late. Beckman orders Chuck and Sarah to infiltrate a charity casino being run by Kirk to investigate the counterfeiting operation. Chuck later remarks to Sarah how he expected her to be "halfway to Bryce," but she tells him that this is her assignment. Regardless, the situation between them remains strained and is only made worse when, at the charity event that night, Chuck grows increasingly jealous while Sarah flirts with Kirk as part of the operation. He loses $100,000 at a roulette wheel as a result of trying to show up the philanthropist, but also flashes on an attache to the Taiwanese ambassador, whom he sees Kirk arguing with.

The next morning Chuck watches Casey washing his prized 1985 Crown Vic, and asks what Beckman meant by Sarah using any means necessary to get close to Kirk as part of her investigation. Casey plays on Chuck's jealousy by telling him Sarah will be seducing Kirk. Chuck goes back to work, where Morgan, who is having lunch with Anna and her parents, calls him to say he thinks he sees Sarah on someone's boat. Chuck heads down to the marina to check up on things, while Casey angrily shows him a full team is in place keeping watch on things. Just as Kirk and Sarah are on their way below deck, one of Kirk's men is bringing a crate on board which triggers a flash. Chuck believes the crate contains the counterfeit plates. The team moves in based on the Intersect intel, but discover medical supplies instead. Due to the humiliation of the botched op, Beckman benches the team.

An angry Sarah, professing to believe that Chuck's flash was faked out of jealousy, confronts him. He insists it was genuine. The heated discussion turns towards Sarah's feelings toward Bryce, and Chuck and Sarah's kiss, and soon leads to an argument when Chuck asks if she had kissed him when they thought they were going to die because he just happened to be there, or if she actually felt something for him. Sarah angrily tells him it was a mistake that would not be repeated. During a briefing with Beckman and Graham, Casey and Sarah both appear suspicious that Chuck's flash was fraudulent because of his jealousy. Afterward, an annoyed Casey demands to know if Sarah compromised herself with Chuck. Sarah somberly asks Casey if he's ever wanted to have a normal life, to which he responds that sacrificing that to protect the nation and its people was the right choice. Sarah agrees to talk to Chuck, and if she cannot fix things, will request reassignment.

Chuck returns to work where Morgan sends him a picture of himself taking a cruise with Anna and her parents, and catches a glimpse of one of Kirk's crates. Chuck realizes Kirk put the counterfeit plates on the boat belonging to the attache whom Anna's parents work for, but Casey refuses to act since Beckman has benched the team. Chuck then turns to Sarah, who initially tries to postpone the conversation. Chuck insists anyway, and after explaining and telling her Morgan and Anna are on the boat, she unhesitatingly jumps to help (against standing orders from Beckman and Graham). They are joined by Casey at the marina, who also decides to disregard his orders and join them in stopping Kirk. Chuck spots and flashes on a GPS transponder fixed to the Taiwanese attache's boat, and when he also flashes on a crate Kirk is loading onto his own boat, realizes that he's going to destroy the plates and kill the attache, along with Morgan, Anna and her parents.

While Sarah and Chuck use their cover to distract Kirk (Sarah wanting to go with Kirk, and Chuck as her jealous boyfriend), Casey sneaks aboard and disables the guards. A fight breaks out and Kirk disappears into the cabin. Chuck pursues him, but is nearly hit when Kirk fires off the missile (knocking himself unconscious from the blast at the same time). Casey and Sarah secure the boat, but the missile is now homing in on the GPS beacon. Chuck resets the missile's homing device, but this sends it back to them. With no other choice, Chuck uses the GPS built into Casey's Crown Vic and redirects the missile, destroying the car. Later at the Buy More holiday party, Chuck and Sarah reconcile their relationship and agree to remain friends. Meanwhile, Beckman calls Casey to inform him the new Intersect is nearly ready and that it would soon be time to "take care of Bartowski."

=== Buy More ===
Morgan has been spying on Anna, and saw her go out with someone else while hiding in her bushes. Anna reveals that she was meeting her parents, who work in Taiwan's diplomatic office and are in the country to attend a charity function. Morgan insists on meeting them, which Anna reluctantly agrees to. Chuck tells Morgan to just be himself, but Jeff and Lester tell him he has to be better. At lunch with them the next day, Morgan makes a fool of himself and embarrasses Anna attempting to impress them. While there, he sees Sarah flirting with Kirk on his boat and calls to tell Chuck. Chuck later tells him he was mistaken.

Morgan joins Anna and her family for a cruise aboard the Taiwanese attache's boat, unaware that Kirk has stowed the crates containing counterfeit plates and plans to destroy it. He sees the missile and thinks it's fireworks.

At the Buy More Christmas party, Anna admits she was not embarrassed about Morgan, she was embarrassed about who she is when she's with her parents because she changes her looks and behavior to fit what they want her to be and is not herself. The two reconcile and sneak off to have sex in the break room.

== Production ==
"Chuck Versus the Crown Vic" introduces Casey's fondness for his Crown Victoria, however this was the car's first appearance in the show. Anna is revealed to be of Taiwanese descent, while Lester is established to be Jewish. Chuck also begins to further develop his "Charles Carmichael" persona independent of his real life, as Chuck does not drink martinis but Carmichael loves them. Given events of later seasons of the series, this episode also helps establish the depth of Sarah's connection to Chuck, even at an early stage.

This episode is the first mention since "Chuck Versus the Helicopter" of Casey's orders to terminate Chuck once the Intersect is rebuilt.

=== Production details ===
- The car used to portray Casey's Crown Vic is not the 1985 model he indicates in the episode, but a 1991 model.
- Just as the missile is about to hit the Crown Vic, you can clearly see the windshield and other windows have been removed to avoid injury in the upcoming explosion.
- As an excuse to cover for Sarah, Chuck claims she has a spastic colon, just as he did in the episode "Chuck Versus the Sizzling Shrimp".

=== Flashes ===
- Chuck flashes on one of the bills Lon Kirk's men are handling and identifies it as counterfeit.
- Kirk gets into an argument with an attache to the Taiwanese ambassador, on whom Chuck flashes.
- When Kirk's men are loading crates on his boat Chuck flashes. However, Kirk's men had swapped the crate that actually contains the plates.
- Chuck flashes on the GPS beacon and the missile launcher Kirk intends to use to destroy the attache's boat.

== Reception ==
Reviews for "Chuck Versus the Crown Vic" were generally mixed. BuddyTV noted the episode regressed after the events of the previous two episodes, though remained largely positive. TV Squad found the episode generally underwhelming, though found Morgan's meeting with Anna's parents, and the reveal of Casey's termination orders enjoyable.

IGN's own review was more overwhelmingly positive, rating the episode an 8.9/10. While TV Squad found the "will they won't they" tension between Chuck and Sarah stale and repetitive, IGN reacted more favorably, particularly citing the acting of Levi and Strahovski. Reviews responded positively to the Buy More holiday party and particularly the scene of Casey washing his titular Crown Vic.

== References to popular culture ==
- Big Mike calls Morgan "Captain Stubing" when he's walking through the Buy More in a boating cap and jacket. Captain Stubing (Gavin MacLeod) was the captain of MS Pacific Princess on The Love Boat.
- While on the attache's boat, Morgan mimics the "King of the World" scene from Titanic.
- Chuck calls Morgan "Little Buddy," a reference to Skipper Jonas Grumby and 1st Mate Willy Gilligan on Gilligan's Island.
- Casey (Adam Baldwin) tells Chuck to "Flush out your headgear, new guy". Baldwin's character, Animal Mother, uttered the identical admonishment to Rafterman in Full Metal Jacket.
- Chuck and Casey both describe the latter's beloved car as "shiny", a positive slang adjective used in the TV show Firefly and its spinoff movie Serenity which also featured Adam Baldwin.
- Chuck flashes at the charity event on a character named "Roshan Chen" after two characters from the popular Warcraft 3 mod DotA.
