= Cort Hessler =

American assistant director and stuntman

- Education: West Orange High School
- Occupations: Assistant director, stuntman

Cort Hessler is an American assistant director and stuntman. He won a Primetime Emmy Award and was nominated for twelve more in the category Outstanding Stunt Coordination for his work on the television programs Third Watch, ER, Blue Bloods and The Blacklist.
