= Chuck Versus the Undercover Lover =

- Chuck episode
- Episode no.: Season 1 Episode 12
- Directed by: Fred Toye
- Written by: Phil Klemmer
- Production code: 3T6461
- Original air date: January 24, 2008

Guest appearances
- Pasha D. Lychnikoff as Victor Federov; Ryan McPartlin as Devon Woodcomb; Ivana Miličević as Ilsa Trinchina; Scott Krinsky as Jeff Barnes; Vik Sahay as Lester Patel

Episode chronology
| ← Previous "Chuck Versus the Crown Vic" | Next → "Chuck Versus the Marlin" |

"Chuck Versus the Undercover Lover" aired on NBC on January 24, 2008. It is the 12th episode of the first season of Chuck, and aired alongside "Chuck Versus the Marlin" to close out the season. Casey is forced to revisit his past when his presumed-dead girlfriend resurfaces. Meanwhile, Ellie and Awesome have a fight, and it falls upon Morgan to help them patch things up.

== Plot summary ==
=== Main plot ===
In 2004, John Casey is in Chechnya undercover as an energy consultant, staying with his AP photographer girlfriend, Ilsa (Ivana Miličević). She goes out with her camera, leaving him to sleep in and enters a restaurant just as a bomb explodes. Casey is jarred from bed and runs out to find the plaza near the hotel in chaos. All that's left of Ilsa is the charred remains of her camera. Four years later, it is revealed a digital camera triggered Casey's memory. He is about to attack an angry customer who is berating him when Chuck intervenes. Chuck goes to the storage cage and kicks out Jeff, who is stealing celebrity hotel room phone numbers from the hotel's computer, which is in for repairs. Chuck flashes on one name in the register, and as more names trigger additional flashes he begins writing them down, except for one: Ilsa Trinchina, who has a connection with Casey. Chuck informs Casey of the flashes, and then teases him with the nickname "Sugar Bear," which he got from Ilsa's file. Casey nearly strangles him in a fit of rage.

Chuck advises Sarah of the flashes, and what he saw about Casey. Sarah's own interest is piqued and she agrees to check into it. The team is ordered by Beckman to head to the hotel to investigate. Chuck begins to tease Casey again about Ilsa, but he storms out angrily. Sarah tells Chuck that she discovered Ilsa was dead. They reach the hotel, where Chuck and Sarah use their cover as hotel staff to get close to a group of Russian mobsters gathered in town, on whom Chuck flashes. One of the mobsters mistakenly identifies Chuck as his cousin and pulls him into the celebration. While dancing with the Russians, Chuck sees Ilsa and tries to alert Sarah, but the mobster sees him and believes Chuck is trying to tell him he's interested in Sarah, so she is drawn into the dance as well. Chuck warns Sarah about Ilsa, and the two break away warning Casey they've been compromised. Before they can get out of sight, Casey runs right into Ilsa, and tells her in disbelief he thought she was dead. Ilsa tells him when she woke up after the blast she had no memory of who she was, and could only recall his face. Meanwhile, Chuck flashes on the head of the mobsters, Victor Federov (Pasha D. Lychnikoff). He is in town to marry his fiancé, Ilsa.

Sarah is ordered to monitor Federov, while Chuck and Casey return to the Buy More. Chuck tries to get Casey to open up, but he initially rebuffs him. After some more pestering, Casey finally tells Chuck about how he and Ilsa met, surprising Chuck that Casey is capable of real emotion. He asks why Chuck is so interested, and Chuck admits that if even Casey can find love, maybe there's hope for him as well. Casey is prepared to give up - if Ilsa was the good woman he thought, she wouldn't be with Federov. Chuck then reminds him that she didn't know what Casey did when they were together, so maybe she doesn't know about Federov. The two head back to the hotel, and tell a suspicious Sarah they've come to help. She goes to plant a bug in Federov's room and asks the two of them to monitor the surveillance. Ilsa is alone in the bar, and Chuck convinces Casey to go see her. Meanwhile, Sarah runs into trouble when one of the mob enforcers recognizes her from the party, and she is forced to knock him out and hide him. Sarah calls Casey to plant the bug, but Chuck goes instead. He sneaks into Federov's room and, while planting the bug, sees Ilsa's briefcase. He opens a secret compartment and flashes, learning that Ilsa is not who she says she is, and is actually a French spy.

Ilsa returns to her room and Chuck is forced to hide under the bed. She brings Casey into the room and the two are about to have sex when Chuck's phone rings and alerts Casey to his presence. Chuck warns him about his flash, but Ilsa already has a gun on him. Before any explanations can be made, a very drunk Federov returns to have sex with Ilsa, but he passes out. Ilsa helps Chuck and Casey escape. She later approaches Casey at the Buy More and admits she was never caught in the bomb blast, and works for the French Secret Service assigned to bring down Federov. She apologizes to Casey for her dishonesty, and returns the necklace he gave her in Chechnya. Later, Chuck goes to Casey's apartment and finds him heavily drunk, listening to Neil Diamond, and enjoying a dinner of burnt Hot Pockets. Chuck tries to convince him to fight for Ilsa, but he's resigned to letting her go until they discover a bug in Ilsa's necklace planted by Federov, who knew from the start she was working for the French government. Casey immediately decides he has to save her, and drags Chuck with him.

They contact Sarah and arrive at the hotel but are ambushed in Federov's room and tied back-to-back. Federov intends to marry and murder Ilsa, then fake his death by putting Casey, Ilsa and Chuck on his private plane and letting it crash. After Federov leaves, Casey provokes the guards. Using Chuck to protect his back and also as a weapon, he takes on the henchmen but they are eventually forced out a window and fall several stories into a pool below. Casey emerges from the pool and has guns drawn on him by several of Federov's men as he announces his objection to the wedding. Sarah backs him up, but recognizing she is outnumbered, sets her gun down only to kick it to Ilsa, who ends the stalemate by drawing it on Federov.

Casey and Ilsa share one night together and say goodbye outside Chuck's apartment the next morning (while he incompetently tries to spy on them). After she leaves, Casey tells Chuck that they'll likely never see each other again. Chuck tries to offer Casey consolation saying that at least they have their friendship, but Casey angrily shoves him away into the bushes and walks alone back into his apartment.

=== Subplot ===
Ellie and Awesome come into the Buy More. They're greeted by Jeff and Lester, but Morgan takes control to help them decide on a joint anniversary gift. Ellie is interested in a big-screen TV, but Awesome is eyeing a washer and dryer. Both insist their choice will give them more time together - Ellie believes they can watch TV together, while Awesome argues they don't have to worry about laundromats and can stay in more. Ellie gets paged by the hospital and leaves the choice to Devon, who decides on the washer/dryer. When she finds out that he went with his own choice of the washer/dryer, the two get into a fight.

Awesome spends the evening at the Buy More with Morgan, Jeff, Lester, and other Nerd Herders and Green Shirts complaining about relationships over a game of poker, which Awesome wins. Unfortunately he didn't realize that the all-male group was playing strip poker, and hurriedly leaves when the others start undressing. Meanwhile, Sarah is looking for Chuck and arrives at his apartment, where she finds that Ellie is very drunk and upset about the fight. Sarah tries to get away at first but agrees to stay when Ellie begins to freak out about being left alone. Morgan shows up and Sarah uses him as an excuse to leave and find Chuck and Casey.

Morgan tries to help Ellie to bed, but she passes out drunk on the couch. Eventually he gets her to the bedroom where he stays at her insistence. When she wakes up the next morning she initially panics before realizing that nothing actually happened. She thanks Morgan for being there, and especially for not taking advantage of her. Awesome comes in and apologizes. Morgan flinches fearing he's about to be hit, but Awesome knows that it wasn't even possible Ellie would actually sleep with Morgan. Awesome shows Ellie that he got her the TV, and the two make up.

== Production ==
"Chuck Versus the Undercover Lover" was one of two episodes aired on January 24 to close out the season. It was run at 8pm EST, followed by an episode of The Apprentice, with the second episode of Chuck, "Chuck Versus the Marlin", airing at 10pm. These were the last two episodes completed by the time of the 2007 Writers' Strike, which interrupted production of the series. Although Chuck received a full, 22-episode pickup for the rest of the season, Josh Schwartz elected to end with the episodes already filmed rather than restart production.

This was the first episode to reveal significant details of John Casey's personal life. Bosnian actress Ivana Miličević was cast in the role of Casey's former girlfriend Ilsa Trinchina, who he believed was killed in a bombing in Chechnya. Josh Schwartz stated in interviews that this episode would provide a glimpse into what makes Casey Casey, showing that Ilsa's apparent death profoundly affected him.

=== Production details ===
Contrary to the subtitles, Sarah does not say "Don't touch me again, pig" in Russian to her assailant in the hotel. She says "Touch me again, and I'll break off not only your finger." (Datronsya do menya otkruchu ne tolko paletz.)

=== Flashes ===
- Chuck flashes on several names in the hotel computer, including Ilsa's, which revealed her connection to Casey.
- At the hotel Chuck identifies several of the mobsters with additional flashes.
- Chuck flashes on Victor Federov and determines why the mobsters are there.
- A flash on the contents of Ilsa's briefcase identifies her as a French intelligence operative.
- Chuck flashes on the bug Federov planted on Ilsa's necklace.

== Reception ==
The episode was well received. IGN.com scored it an 8.7 out of 10, particularly citing the development of Casey's character. IGN also praised the revelation of Ilsa's identity and the fight scene with Chuck and Casey tied back-to-back. Some moments were more awkward, but chalked up to the limited rewrites possible due to the writer's strike.

TV Squad enjoyed the break from the Chuck and Sarah relationship and the focus on Casey, and the role-swapping with Sarah as the "straight man" while Casey had his turn to get into trouble with Chuck. They also praised the development of Ellie, Awesome and Morgan. As with IGN, the fight scene with Casey and Chuck tied together was particularly noteworthy.

== References to popular culture ==
- The dance the Russian arms dealers are performing at the hotel is called Kalinka and is a national Russian dance.
- This episode includes many references to the 1942 movie Casablanca including:
  - The name of Casey's ex-girlfriend is Ilsa, the same name as Rick's ex-girlfriend in Casablanca; and her future husband's name is Victor, the same as Ilsa's husband in Casablanca.
  - Casey's ex-girlfriend gets on a plane seemingly never to see him again, the same as in Casablanca with Rick and Ilsa.
  - Chuck says "Don't worry buddy, you'll always have me". In Casablanca the line was "We'll always have Paris".
  - Chuck says to Casey: "I think this is the beginning of a beautiful friendship". The same famous line used in Casablanca by Rick to Captain "Louie" Renault.
  - When Ilsa meets Casey in the Buy More, the movie playing on the TV is Casablanca.
- One of the Russian mobsters identified by Chuck has the nickname "Noodles" Romanov in reference to gangster Noodles Romanoff from the children's cartoon Roger Ramjet.
- Chuck calls Casey "Kemosabe," in reference to The Lone Ranger.
- The scene where Chuck and Casey fall out of the hotel window into the pool is a nod to a similar scene from the movie Lethal Weapon 2.
- The morning after scene for Ellie and Morgan contains Morgan sleepily uttering the line "Damn momma, I've got my headgear on." Anthony Michael Hall's Farmer Ted (The Geek) character uttered the same line towards the end of Sixteen Candles.
- The final shot in the episode parallels the final shot of John Wayne in The Searchers, with Casey pushing Chuck out of the frame to occupy the John Wayne role.
