= Creepshow (TV series) =

American horror anthology television series

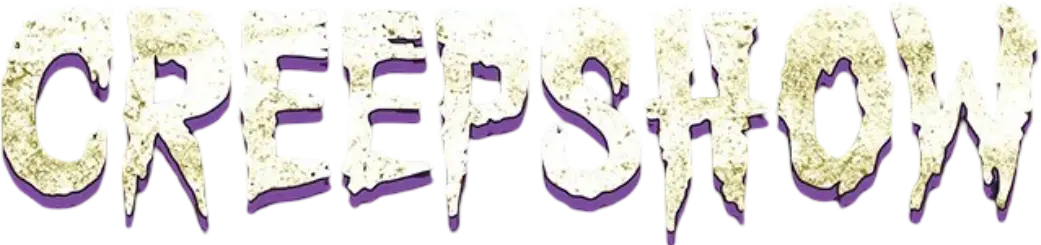
- Genre: Anthology; Horror
- Based on: Creepshow by Stephen King & George A. Romero
- Developed by: Greg Nicotero
- Composer: Christopher Drake
- Country of origin: United States
- Original language: English
- No. of seasons: 4
- No. of episodes: 23 + 2 specials (list of episodes)

Production
- Executive producers: Russell Binder; James Glenn Dudelson; Robert Franklin Dudelson; Jeff Holland; Jordan Kizwani; Greg Nicotero; Stan Spry; Brian Whitten; Eric Scott Woods
- Producers: Julia Hobgood; Alex Orr
- Production locations: Atlanta, Georgia (seasons 1–3); Toronto, Ontario (season 4)
- Running time: 42–45 minutes
- Production companies: Monster Agency Productions; Striker Entertainment; Taurus Entertainment Company

Original release
- Network: Shudder
- Release: September 26, 2019 – October 13, 2023

Creepshow is an American horror anthology television series that serves as a continuation of the 1982 film of the same name with each episode featuring two horror stories. The series premiered on September 26, 2019, on Shudder.

In October 2019, the series was renewed for a second season. On October 30, 2020, an animated special titled A Creepshow Animated Special was released. On December 18, 2020, a holiday special titled A Creepshow Holiday Special was released The second season premiered on April 1, 2021. In February 2021, the series was renewed for a third season, which premiered on September 23, 2021. In February 2022, the series was renewed for a fourth season, which premiered on October 13, 2023. In September 2025, the series was canceled after four seasons.

== Premise ==
The Creep shows audience members darkly grim horror stories from the pages of the Creepshow comic book. Each story evokes the traits of a comic book like the first Creepshow film and shows some occasional advertisements of horror products promoted in the comics. The stories detail different things including but not limited to demons, ghosts, vampires, werewolves, and zombies.

== Episodes ==
Season	Episodes	Segments	Originally released	
Season	Episodes	Segments	First released	Last released
1	6	12	September 26, 2019	October 31, 2019
Specials	2	3	October 30, 2020	December 18, 2020
2	5	9	April 1, 2021	April 29, 2021
3	6	12	September 23, 2021	October 28, 2021
4	6	12	October 13, 2023	

== Production ==
=== Development ===
Taurus Entertainment Company first began exploring adapting Creepshow for television as far back as February 1997.

In July 2018, the Creepshow television series was announced, with Greg Nicotero listed as a producer and streaming service Shudder as the distributor.

As in the original Creepshow, the Creep is a full-bodied puppet that delivers gags (mostly featured in the cold openings of each episode) through nonverbal cues or laughter. There were some episodes that used an animated version of the Creep.

=== Adaptations ===
On January 16, 2019, it was announced that one of the segments of the pilot episode would be based on Stephen King's short story, "Survivor Type" from his 1985 collection Skeleton Crew; however, that story was ultimately not used for the first season and was instead part of the animated Halloween special that aired in 2020.

As with the feature films, the series draws from short story fiction. Subsequently, the following were also announced as the basis for stories:

- Gray Matter by Stephen King
- By the Silver Water of Lake Champlain by Joe Hill
- The Companion by Joe R. Lansdale
- The House of the Head by Josh Malerman
- The Man in the Suitcase by Christopher Buehlman
- All Hallows Eve by Bruce Jones
- Times Is Tough in Musky Holler by John Skipp and Dori Miller
- The Finger by David J. Schow
- Survivor Type teleplay by Greg Nicotero based on short story by Stephen King
- Twittering from the Circus of the Dead teleplay by Melanie Dale based on short story by Joe Hill
- Shapeshifters Anonymous by J. A. Konrath
- Mums by Joe Hill
- Grieving Process by Mike D. McCarty

Original stories announced include:

- Lydia Layne's Better Half by John Harrison and Greg Nicotero
- Skincrawlers written by Paul Dini and Stephen Langford
- Night of the Paw by John Esposito
- Bad Wolf Down by Rob Schrab
- Model Kid by John Esposito
- Public Television Of The Dead by Rob Schrab
- Dead and Breakfast by Michael Rousselet and Erik Sandoval
- Pesticide by Frank Dietz
- The Right Snuff by Paul Dini, Stephen Langford and Greg Nicotero
- Sibling Rivalry by Melanie Dale
- Pipe Screams by Daniel Kraus
- Within the Walls of Madness by John Esposito and Greg Nicotero
- Night of the Living Late Show by Dana Gould
- Queen Bee by Erik Sandoval and Michael Rousselet
- Skeletons in the Closet by John Esposito
- Familiar by Josh Malerman
- The Last Tsuburaya by Paul Dini and Stephen Langford
- Okay, I'll Bite by John Harrison
- Stranger Sings by Jordana Arkin
- Meter Reader by John Esposito
- Time Out by Barrington Smith and Paul Seetachit
- The Things in Oakwood's Past by Greg Nicotero and Daniel Kraus
- Drug Traffic by Mattie Do & Christopher Larsen
- A Dead Girl Named Sue by Heather Anne Campbell
- Twenty Minutes with Cassandra by Jamie Flanagan
- Smile by Mike Scannell
- The Hat by Byron Willinger & Philip de Blasi
- The Parent Deathtrap by Erik Sandoval & Michael Rousselet
- To Grandmother's House We Go by William Butler
- Meet the Belaskos by John Esposito
- Cheat Code by Claire Carré & Charles Spano
- Something Burrowed, Something Blue by Todd Spence & Zak White
- Doodles by Zak White & Todd Spence
- George Romero in 3-D! by Todd Spence & Zak White
- Baby Teeth by Melanie Dale

=== Casting ===
In April 2019, cast members announced included Adrienne Barbeau, Giancarlo Esposito, and Tobin Bell. Subsequent announced cast members included David Arquette, Tricia Helfer, and Dana Gould. On June 20, 2019, Jeffrey Combs, Bruce Davison, DJ Qualls, Big Boi, and Kid Cudi were announced as additional cast members.

In September 2020, Anna Camp, Adam Pally, Josh McDermitt, Keith David, and Ashley Laurence were cast for the second season. Later in October 2020, Marilyn Manson, Ali Larter, Iman Benson, Ryan Kwanten, Barbara Crampton, C. Thomas Howell, Denise Crosby, Breckin Meyer, Ted Raimi, Kevin Dillon and Eric Edelstein were cast. On February 1, 2021, It was announced that Manson's episode would not air due to multiple abuse allegations and that an episode starring Molly Ringwald would air instead. In March 2021, it was announced that Justin Long and D'Arcy Carden would be starring in an episode.

Season 3 cast members include King Bach, Ethan Embry, Michael Rooker, James Remar, Reid Scott and Johnathon Schaech.

=== Directors ===
Unlike the film entries, the Creepshow series will feature several directors instead of one director. Announced segment directors include David Bruckner, Roxanne Benjamin, Rob Schrab, John Harrison, Greg Nicotero, and Tom Savini; the latter three having worked on the first two Creepshow features.

=== Filming ===
Principal photography for the series began in February 2019 in Atlanta, Georgia. Season 2 began filming in September 2020; it was supposed to begin in March 2020, but was shut down due to the COVID-19 pandemic.

In season four, its episodes were filmed in Toronto.

== Release ==
The series premiered on Shudder on September 26, 2019.

== Critical reception ==
The series received acclaim from critics. On Rotten Tomatoes, the series holds an approval rating of 97% based on 32 reviews with an average rating of 7.6/10. The critical consensus reads: "Delightfully eerie, Creepshow captures the spirit of the original while forging its own spooky path." On Metacritic, the series has a weighted average score of 64 out of 100, based on 5 critics, indicating "generally favorable reviews".

== In other media ==
=== Tie-in novels ===
Scholastic Books released a book entitled Creepshow: The Taker, featuring two novellas inspired by the TV series. They were written by Elley Cooper. A followup installment was released on April 28, 2021, entitled Creepshow: The Cursed, also written by Elley Cooper. A prose anthology entitled Creepshow: 13 Tales of Terror was announced on November 21, 2025. The anthology features the works of authors Jonathan Maberry, Nancy A. Collins, Lisa Morton, Steve Niles, Keith DeCandido, Tim Waggoner, Thomas E. Sniegoski, Nick Roberts, Dennis Crosby, James Aquilone, Gwendolyn Kiste, David Avallone and Simon Bestwick, with illustrations by EV Cantada. The anthology was released on May 19, 2026.

=== Halloween Horror Nights ===
On August 3, 2019, Universal Parks & Resorts announced that Creepshow would be coming to Halloween Horror Nights exclusively at its Universal Studios Hollywood theme park. The maze featured three segments from the 1982 film ("Father's Day", "The Crate", and "They're Creeping Up on You") as well as two others from the newly made television version for Shudder ("Gray Matter" and "Bad Wolf Down").

=== Video game ===
Horror game studio DreadXP and developer DarkStone Digital announced a video game in 2022. The game was released on August 14, 2026.

=== Comic books ===
Skybound Entertainment has published a number of comics based on the show, starting in September 2022. They primarily feature original stories, by different creators in each issue. They have so far released three mini-series of five issues each, two holiday specials and one special based on Joe Hill's "Wolverton Station".
