= Brotherhood of the Rose (miniseries) =

- "Brotherhood of the Rose" DVD Cover
- Written by: David Morrell
- Screenplay by: David Morrell; Gy Waldron
- Directed by: Marvin J. Chomsky
- Starring: Peter Strauss; David Morse; Robert Mitchum; Connie Sellecca; James Sikking
- Theme music composer: Laurence Rosenthal
- Country of origin: United States
- Original language: English
- No. of episodes: 2

Production
- Producers: Marvin J. Chomsky; Stirling Silliphant
- Cinematography: James Bartle
- Running time: 240 minutes

Original release
- Network: NBC
- Release: January 22 – January 23, 1989

Brotherhood of the Rose is 1989 American two-part television miniseries directed by Marvin J. Chomsky, based on David Morrell's 1983 novel of the same name. The novel was adapted by Gy Waldron

== Plot ==
Brotherhood of the Rose tells the story of Saul and Chris, two orphans from Philadelphia. They are adopted by a man named Eliot, who treats the boys like his own children and raises them to become assassins. When a mission goes wrong for Saul, and Chris is involved in an international incident, they begin to question their lives and their missions, and start to see Eliot in a new light.

== Cast ==
- Peter Strauss as Saul
- David Morse as Chris
- Robert Mitchum as Eliot
- Connie Sellecca as Erika
- James Sikking as Felix
- M. Emmet Walsh as Hardy
- James Hong as Col. Chan
- Rhys McConnochie as Orlik
- Robert Taylor as Pollux
- Brett Williams as Castor
- Ken Blackburn as Forbes

== Production ==
=== Filming ===
The majority of filming for the movie took place in New Zealand, with that country portraying numerous other world-wide locations.

== Release ==
The film premiered on January 22, 1989 on NBC, following Super Bowl XXIII.

== Reception ==
Its initial broadcast resulted in the two-part movie finishing as the highest-rated TV movie of the 1988-89 TV season. The first part was watched by 32 million viewers, and the second by 27.4 million.
