= Double image =

Double Image may refer to:

- Double Image (novel), 1998 a noir thriller by David Morrell set in modern-day Los Angeles
- Double Image (album), a 1987 album by Frank Morgan and George Cables
- A result of photographic double exposure
- In photography, a result of moving the camera during the exposure
- A stereographic image pair

== See also ==
- Double vision (disambiguation)
