= List of Creepshow (TV series) episodes =

Creepshow Anthology

The following is a list of episodes of the American anthology television series Creepshow, which premiered on Shudder on September 26, 2019. As of October 13, 2023, 23 episodes and 2 specials of Creepshow have been released.

== Series overview ==
Season	Episodes	Segments	Originally released	
Season	Episodes	Segments	First released	Last released
1	6	12	September 26, 2019	October 31, 2019
Specials	2	3	October 30, 2020	December 18, 2020
2	5	9	April 1, 2021	April 29, 2021
3	6	12	September 23, 2021	October 28, 2021
4	6	12	October 13, 2023	

== Episodes ==
=== Season 1 (2019) ===
No. overall	No. in season	Title	Directed by	Written by	Original release date
1	1	"Gray Matter"	Greg Nicotero	Story by : Stephen King; Teleplay by : Byron Willinger and Philip de Blasi	September 26, 2019
1	1	"The House of the Head"	John Harrison	Josh Malerman	September 26, 2019
The Creep opens a crate (resembling the one seen in the first film) to discover it contains issues of Creepshow. He grabs one of the issues out of the crate, then turns to the audience, and laughs. After the opening credits, there is an advertisement for other Creepshow issues. Then there is an advertisement for deluxe full-over the head horror monster masks (consisting of a vampire, a sea monster, a witch, a Sasquatch, a vampire mummy, a voodoo zombie, Lady Frankenstein, a weregorilla, a scarecrow, the Creep, a genie, and a severed head) before the first story begins. "Gray Matter": During Hurricane Charlie, a group of townspeople are huddled together in a store to wait out the coming storm. They are met by local boy Timmy Grenadine (Christopher Nathan), who nervously asks for a case of Harrow's Supreme beer for his alcoholic father Richie (Jesse C. Boyd). When Timmy mentions that his father is "real sick" and doesn't want to go back home, the chief of police (Tobin Bell) and his friend Doc (Giancarlo Esposito) volunteer to check on him. While they travel to Timmy's house, Timmy explains to shopkeeper Dixie (Adrienne Barbeau) that after Richie's wife died, his drinking problem spiraled out of control. After drinking a "bad beer" one day, Richie gradually mutated into a gelatinous monster with a taste for human flesh. When the chief discovers the monster, he tries to put it down, only for the creature to absorb him and begin multiplying. Doc runs back to the store to report on what has happened as Dixie calculates that within only six days, the creatures will take over the entire world and drive humanity to extinction. The hands of the multiplied creatures then break in through the ceiling and grab Doc as he, Dixie, and Timmy scream. The Creep chuckles and shuffles into view on a red background. He proceeds to open a beer can and drink from it. Then it shows advertisements for laboratory-tested "Make a Monster" hobby kits that are easily-assembled and for the "boy who has everything", a mobile tank that has different features, and X-Ray specs. After that, the next story begins. "The House of the Head": Evie (Cailey Fleming), an imaginative little girl, is the new owner of a large dollhouse for a family of dolls she calls the Smithsmiths. After returning home from school the next day, she discovers the Smithsmiths have been moved into different positions than she left them. She also discovers that the dollhouse contains a figurine of a ghoulish severed head that appears to have supernatural abilities, moving throughout the dollhouse when she isn't watching. Fearing that the head will eventually kill her doll family, Evie buys more dolls to try remove it from the house. After the head manages to decapitate a police officer figurine and a Native American figurine when they try to remove it from the house, it then decapitates the Smithsmiths themselves. Fed up, Evie takes the head and angrily throws it across the room. Realizing the grave mistake she has just made, Evie looks for the head. She finds it under her bed, where it has grown to human size. To finally get rid of it, Evie locks the head back in the dollhouse, then has her parents (Rachel Hendrix and David Shea) sell the house at a yard sale. While her father asks Evie if she is sure of her decision, her mother states that she must be growing up. As Evie's parents drive away, a cashier of the sale peers into the dollhouse to see that the head is now attached to one of the dolls. The closing shot has the Creep painting the figurine of the head, laughing. Transitioning to animation, the Creep then holds up the next issue of Creepshow, still laughing.
2	2	"Bad Wolf Down"	Rob Schrab	Rob Schrab	October 3, 2019
2	2	"The Finger"	Greg Nicotero	David J. Schow	October 3, 2019
The Creep is shown getting his palm read by a gypsy. A pentagram then lights up on his hand, frightening the gypsy as he laughs. After the opening credits, there are advertisements for products for the Creepshow Fan Club like an Alien Vampire from Venus LP record, a Giant Living Dead Gorilla glow in the dark poster, the film Frankenstein vs. Frankenzilla, and the film The Slime before the first story begins. "Bad Wolf Down": In World War II, Lawrence Talby (David A. MacDonald), the captain of a platoon of American soldiers, retreats into a French forest with his surviving men, Sgt. Quist (Nelson Bonilla), Pvt. Rivers (Callan Wilson), and Doc Kessler (Kid Cudi). The soldiers manage to seek refuge within an abandoned police station, but discover that the station is inhabited by a guilt-consumed werewolf (Kate Freund) who longs for death. Overcome with cowardice and paranoia, Quist locks the others in a cell before fleeing. Before long, the station is surrounded on all sides by Nazi soldiers led by Reinhard Schmelzgerat (Jeffrey Combs), a vengeful Obersturmführer who seeks revenge on the soldiers for murdering his son. With no other options to escape, Talby and his men resort to drastic measures, allowing themselves to be converted into werewolves to stay alive. Using their newfound abilities, Talby and his men manage to slaughter their attackers. In a mad dash to the rally point, Quist accidentally steps on a land mine and loses an arm and a leg. Talby, in his human form, confronts him. As Quist begs for forgiveness, Talby states that "war changes a man" as he starts to transform into a werewolf. There are advertisements of Movie Monster Kits for Frankenstein's Monster, a vampire, a zombie, an alien, a mummy, a werewolf, a demon, Jack the Ripper, a swamp beast, a Demonsaurus Rex, a witch, and a Sasquatch. Transitioning to animation, the Creep is shown hidden among the statues in a graveyard, laughing when he is spotted by the passing camera. Then the next story begins. "The Finger": Clark Wilson (DJ Qualls), a lonely and resentful man who has a bitter outlook on life, collects lost and abandoned objects. One day, he discovers a mysterious severed finger in the middle of the street. After taking the finger home, he ends up spilling beer on it. Over time, the finger gradually grows into a strange lizard-like creature he dubs "Bob". Clark and Bob manage to get along surprisingly well, but it would seem that Bob develops a habit of seeking out and killing anyone who angers his new owner, presenting Clark with their body parts as morbid offerings while attracting the attention of two police detectives (Antwan Mills and Gino Crognale). When the police ultimately find him trying to dispose of the heads of his ungrateful step-children into his garbage disposal, Clark is committed to an asylum. Proceeding to go insane, Clark tells the viewers that Bob loves him and will come for him as he hears Bob making sounds outside his window. In the closing shot, the Creep is shown clutching the severed finger that will ultimately grow into Bob while laughing.
3	3	"All Hallows Eve"	John Harrison	Bruce Jones	October 10, 2019
3	3	"The Man in the Suitcase"	David Bruckner	Christopher Buehlman	October 10, 2019
As Night of the Living Dead plays on a TV, the Creep is seen carving pumpkins. He is interrupted by the doorbell, answering the door to a rude trick-or-treater whom he proceeds to assault with his knife offscreen. Returning to his pumpkins, the Creep finishes up the one he was carving by "decorating" it with his visitor's severed eyes and teeth, laughing maniacally. After the credits, there are advertisements for Monster Glow Puzzles for Frankendead, the House of the Head from episode one, and the Creep, Paint-A-Monster statues, a Zombie Nose that can turn anyone into a zombie, Lady Frankenstein and Creepshow T-shirts, and The Creep plaster casing coin bank before the first story begins. "All Hallows Eve": In the town of Smithville, Pete, Jill, Binky, Bobby, and Pete's little brother Skeeter (Connor Christie, Madison Thompson, Jason Jabbar Wardlaw Jr., Andrew Eakle, and Aodhan Lane) are five kids who call themselves the Golden Dragons. On Halloween night, the Golden Dragons gather together at the town cemetery, dressed up in costumes and apparently going trick-or-treating. The quintet stroll throughout the neighborhood supposedly in search of candy, seemingly paying no mind that the adults in the neighborhood show fear and resentment towards them (as the Dragons themselves have been known to unabashedly insult others, burst into houses with the adults doing nothing to stop them, and the adults complaining that they do this every year). Their "route" reaches its climax when they discover Eddie Hathaway (Michael May) and abduct him, which his obviously insane and broken mother does nothing to prevent. Revealed to be ghosts, the Golden Dragons reminisce on their last day alive, where it is revealed that Eddie and his hoodlum friends locked them in their treehouse and set fire to it as a Halloween prank, causing the Golden Dragons to burn to death. Despite his pleas that it was his friends' idea and that no one was supposed to die, the Golden Dragons tie Eddie to the burned ruins of their treehouse and burn him alive, indicating they have done this to all the other gang members, whose families are the resentful adults they have visited. Having broken their cycle of revenge, the Golden Dragons head to the town cemetery and disappear to the afterlife. There is an advertisement for a Giant Life-Sife Venus Vampire. Transitioning to animation, the Creep is seen on the suburb streets, laughing while gesturing towards an open Creepshow issue on the street as it turns to the page containing the next story. "The Man in the Suitcase": Justin (Will Kidrachuck), a college student returning from a trip home to beg his dad for money, discovers a man (Ravi Naidu) painfully squeezed into his suitcase when he returns to his apartment. Justin also discovers that the man is able to produce gold coins when he feels pain upon trying to get him out. Justin is able to give one of the coins to a pawnbroker (Big Boi), which provides him with a modest sum. His ex-girlfriend Carla and roommate Alex (Madison Bailey and Ian Gregg) discover the man in the suitcase as well. Upon seeing the man, Carla and Alex are initially freaked out, but after discovering his ability to produce gold, proceed to rope Justin into torturing the unfortunate man for 48 hours in the hopes of amassing a mother lode of coins. When the 48 hours are over, Alex and Carla get far too consumed with greed and grievously injure Justin when he tries to stop them. In response, the man calls them "naughty" and reveals himself to be a monstrous djinn (Carey Jones), punishing the greedy duo by producing two suitcases. Justin later wakes up in the hospital, where he spies a note from the djinn, stating that he'll be there if he needs him. At the airport, the djinn's human form places his two suitcases on the conveyor belt at the airport. Carla and Alex are heard futilely screaming from within the suitcases. The printed narration states that the suitcases of Carla and Alex are heading towards an uncertain but unpleasant future. The Creepshow comic then closes as the next issue appears over it.
4	4	"The Companion"	David Bruckner	Story by : Joe R. Lansdale, Kasey Lansdale & Keith Lansdale; Teleplay by : Matt Venne	October 17, 2019
4	4	"Lydia Layne's Better Half"	Roxanne Benjamin	Story by : John Harrison & Greg Nicotero; Teleplay by : John Harrison	October 17, 2019
The Creep is seen lighting a candle so he can read the issue of Creepshow he is holding, laughing heartily. After the opening credits, there are advertisements for an actual size Creepasaurus Rex, Monster Size Monsters, and an authentic monkey's paw before the first story begins. "The Companion": In 1987, a young boy named Harold (Logan Allan) flees from his brother Billy (Voltaire Colin Council), who happens to be a relentless and abusive bully. Harold hides on an abandoned farm which he discovers is inhabited by a grotesque scarecrow (Carey Jones) that manages to come to life and chases after him. Hiding in the basement, he learns from an old letter that seven years ago the scarecrow was created to act as a companion by a lonely farmer (Afemio Omilani) after his wife died. However, he found out the scarecrow was too protective of its property and master after it killed a Girl Scout who came onto the farm. The farmer managed to defeat the scarecrow and put it into a hibernation state by plunging his cane into its makeshift heart and eventually committed suicide over his grief at the creation of such a monster. Now that the scarecrow is back, it is looking to kill Harold for trespassing on its late creator's home. Upon finding the farmer's cane, he uses it to protect himself from the scarecrow, discovering that it has a psychological hold on the creature, before plunging it into the scarecrow's heart like the farmer before did. After his encounter, Harold utilizes this turn of events and brings the scarecrow back to his house. He unleashes it on Billy as revenge for his brother's abuse as the Creep watches from the window. A crow flies from the rafters of the Creep's ceiling. The Creep himself is seated at a desk, intently illustrating the current issue of Creepshow. Then the next story begins. "Lydia Layne's Better Half": Lydia Layne (Tricia Helfer), the powerful owner of a large private equity group, passes over her lover Celia Mendez (Danielle Lyn) for an important promotion to CFO that she gives to another worker (Michael Scialabba). In the ensuing argument, Lydia accidentally kills Celia by shoving her into an award that punctures her head. She attempts to discreetly move Celia's corpse into an elevator to try and dispose of it when an earthquake causes the power to go out. Trapped in the elevator for hours on end, Lydia notices Celia's corpse angrily glaring at her and eventually moving on its own, almost as if Celia isn't through with her yet. This turns out to be the truth when Celia's corpse comes back to life and attacks Lydia. When the elevator is opened, the first responders who arrive find Celia's corpse, with a smile on its face, with Lydia's severed head in her lap. The Creepshow comic then closes as the next issue appears over it.
5	5	"Night of the Paw"	John Harrison	John Esposito	October 24, 2019
5	5	"Times Is Tough in Musky Holler"	John Harrison	Story by : John Skipp and Dori Miller; Teleplay by : John Skipp and Dori Miller	October 24, 2019
An animated Creep, holding a lantern, opens the front door to a house, laughing while inviting the viewers inside. "Night of the Paw": Angela (Hannah Barefoot), a murderer on the run, crashes her car and is left badly injured. She later awakens in a funeral home, her injuries patched up, and finds that local mortician Avery "Whitey" Whitlock (Bruce Davison) is the person responsible. Inviting her upstairs, Avery shows her that he possesses a monkey's paw that grants wishes which tend to backfire horrifically on the user. Avery tells her about how he and his wife Marjorie (Susannah Devereux) had the paw given to them by a now-deceased client, and how a wish made by his late wife for money caused her to die in an accident. He then used it to wish her back to life, but she became a zombie (Grace Toso) he was forced to kill. The next morning, Whitey tells Angela that her arrival at his funeral home was not mere coincidence, since he wished for a murderer to relieve him of his misery, revealing that Angela was on the run for performing a mercy killing on her dying husband. When she ends up having to kill Avery, Angela takes the monkey's paw and drives to the morgue. She finds her husband and uses the paw to wish for him to return to life, but her poor wording, "Get up," causes him (Ryan Clay) and the other bodies in the morgue to become zombies. Angela's husband devours her as the paw's final finger clenches. The advertisement for the deluxe full-over the head horror monster masks from episode one are shown. An animated Creep laughs as he stares down at something in a coffin, before proceeding to shut the coffin's lid as the next story begins. "Times Is Tough in Musky Holler": When a zombie apocalypse plagued the town of Musky Holler, used car salesman Lester M. Barclay (Dane Rhodes) used the chaos to convince the city council to appoint him mayor. Once he was put in power, Lester halted the advancement of the zombies and ruled the town with an iron fist by having his predecessor murdered, sanctioning sheriff Deke (David Arquette) and his loyal police officers to rape and murder as they pleased (one of their victims being the original sheriff), and spread propaganda about his own laws. In addition, town pastor Mitchell Ryan (Kermit Rolison), his wife Susan, and his adult son Jimmy claimed that Lester was doing God's will, news director Don Pomade (Tommy Kane) had willingly broadcast Lester's lies, and a local woman named Leslianne Dowd (Karen Strassman) spread vicious gossip that somehow led to the deaths of innocent people. In the present, Lottie (Tracey Bonner) and the original sheriff's son Ezra (Connor Hammond) have led a rebellion to overthrow the corrupt Lester, proceeding to have Lester and his followers subjected to the weaponized zombies through "Live Pie". As the announcer has called them traitors to America, Lester takes the opportunity to state that the civilians are nothing without him and that he did what needed to be done. A flashback narrated by Lottie stated that Lester had turned the high school football field into an arena for his entertainment. Anyone ranging from politicians, doctors, and police officers who challenged his authorities and fail to see his future were condemned there and punished in fighting the weaponized zombies. The limbless, reanimated corpses of those Lester had sent to death slowly crawl toward the condemned, devouring the faces of whoever was responsible for their death. The former mayor's zombified corpse then eats Lester's face as the announcer states "We got pie!" The Creepshow comic then closes as the next issue appears over it.
6	6	"Skincrawlers"	Roxanne Benjamin	Paul Dini & Stephen Langford	October 31, 2019
6	6	"By the Silver Water of Lake Champlain"	Tom Savini	Story by : Joe Hill; Teleplay by : Jason Ciaramella	October 31, 2019
On a lakeshore near a rotting sandwich and a decayed insect-riddled corpse, the Creep is seen fishing, laughing heartily. After the credits, there are advertisements for live seahorses, a darling live pet monkey, and a scary giant size alien eye creature that obeys anyone's demands before the first story begins. "Skincrawlers": An overweight man named Henry Quayle (Dana Gould) learns about "Skin Deep by Sloan", a miraculous new treatment for weight loss created by Dr. Herbert Sloan (Chad Michael Collins) in which fat cells from a person's body are liquefied and ingested by a newly discovered and highly advanced species of leech. Though initially reluctant, Henry is talked into undergoing the treatment on live television from Kelly (Hina X. Khan), who had already undergone the procedure when he first visited the facility. He appears on TV with Dr. Sloan and his assistant Debbie (Melissa Saint-Armand) to demonstrate the process. However, the day of Henry's treatment is also the same day that a major once-in-a-century solar eclipse is set to occur, and when the eclipse reaches totality, all those who went through the procedure have larval leeches gorily burst from their hosts bodies. When Henry confronts Dr. Sloan, he states that he was overweight as well, always looking for a fast cure. He assures that they tested the leeches through every possible scenario, but had not counted on solar eclipses. A large, tentacled leech bursts out of Dr. Sloan's body and starts to attack Henry. Henry manages to kill the leech by crushing it with a vending machine. With the news room still in chaos, Henry triumphantly picks up a candy bar that spilled out of the machine and eats it while grinning smugly. There are advertisements for a Lucky Skull Ring, baby alligators, Creepshow monster hats, and a haunted house mystery bank. Transitioning to animation, a skeleton is seen inside a casket. A heart, veins, muscles, and skin appear over the skeleton as it transforms into the Creep who awakens and laughs as the next story begins. "By the Silver Water of Lake Champlain": In 1984, teenager Rose Philips (Sydney Wease) mourns her father, who had died while attempting to hunt down Champ, the monster that allegedly lives in Lake Champlain. She now seeks to find Champ herself to prove her that late father's claims of having seen the creature were not the delusions of a madman. When she, her little brother Joseph (David Alexander Kaplan), and her boyfriend Thomas (Connor Jones) discover what appears to be Champ's corpse washed up on the shore of the lake, she discovers that her father was right all along, and seeks to show the proof to the world. However, she must first defend herself from her abusive and sadistic stepfather Chet (James Devoti), who seeks to take the credit for the find. After engaging in a physical altercation, Chet holds the kids at knife-point, but he is suddenly devoured whole by a much larger creature. It turns out that the corpse is that of Champ's baby, who tenderly drags her child's corpse back into the lake. When Rose's mother Leigh (Gena Shaw) arrives on the scene, she discovers Champ's shadow disappearing into the fog, discovering that her husband was right all along while also learning of Chet's fate. The family happily return home as Chet's severed leg washes up on the shore. The Creepshow comic then closes.

=== Specials (2020) ===
No. overall	No. in season	Title	Directed by	Written by	Original release date
—	1	"Survivor Type"	Greg Nicotero	Story by : Stephen King; Teleplay by : Greg Nicotero	October 30, 2020
—	1	"Twittering from the Circus of the Dead"	Greg Nicotero	Story by : Joe Hill; Teleplay by : Melanie Dale	October 30, 2020
Both stories in this episode are fully animated in a comic book style. The Creep shuffles into an editing room and sits at a drawing table. He uses a quill to illustrate many differing drawings of himself, rapidly flipping through them to produce an animation of him pointing. After the opening credits, there is an advertisement for a red devil mask and a black magic kit before the first story begins. "Survivor Type": Richard Pinzetti (voiced by Kiefer Sutherland) is an unscrupulous surgeon with ties to New York City's criminal underworld. When he ends up boarding a cruise ship to drop off some heroin, the ship explodes and sinks, leaving Richard stranded on a tiny desert island with very little supplies. With nothing but a woman's corpse that he names "Gloria" for companionship and under the constant threat of starvation, Richard documents his life story and records his time on the island to keep his mind off his voracious appetite. After twisting his ankle, Richard is forced to amputate the injured foot to prevent the risk of infection, using the heroin he managed to save as a painkiller. He starts to hallucinate seeing Gloria's ghost (voiced by Fayna Sanchez) asking him to eat her corpse. As the days pass, Richard runs out of rocks to incapacitate seagulls with and Gloria is washed away in a storm, forcing him to resort to desperate measures to survive. Richard begins to routinely amputate parts of his legs so he can eat them. By the end of the story, Richard goes completely insane and starts eating his hands, envisioning them to taste like ladyfingers. A closing illustration features the Creep lounging with an undead woman of his own on a different island, commenting that he would have preferred a desert island with coconuts and joking that Richard doesn't have "palms". "Twittering from the Circus of the Dead": Blake (voiced by Joey King) is a bratty, social media-obsessed teenager who is, much to her horror, stuck on a road trip with her family. She spends the car ride constantly documenting everything she is thinking about on Twitter as a means to keep herself sane. Eventually, Blake and her family stop by a circus in the middle of nowhere called "Circus of the Dead". Entering the tent, Blake and her family discover that the circus is filled with ravenous zombies that are forced by the sadistic staff to perform various morbid tricks, including killing a lion. At first, Blake and her family think it is all a show, but they soon discover that the show may not entirely be scripted as Blake's brother Eric later volunteers for an act, dies in the process, and is turned into a zombie. Eventually, the ringmistress Gayle Ross (voiced by Fayna Sanchez) states that this will be her final show due to her injuring her ankle, revealing that she is a prisoner of the staff, before being eaten by the zombies. The zombies ultimately get loose and begin invading the stands, devouring what few living audience members had arrived. Blake and her mother are discovered by Blake's zombified father, her mother being killed and Blake herself dragged into the darkness. The ticket taker finds Blake's phone and uses her Twitter account to announce that Blake is the new ringmistress of the Circus of the Dead, nicknamed "Blake the Black-Hearted", as well as promising that the circus will be touring the country soon. The Creep is shown reading the tweet on his own phone, laughing heartily as he retweets it. The Creepshow comic flips to the back cover which promotes the upcoming stories.
—	2	"Shapeshifters Anonymous"	Greg Nicotero	Story by : J. A. Konrath; Teleplay by : Greg Nicotero	December 18, 2020
The Creep looks outside a window to observe the full moon. He sits down in a nearby chair and proceeds to turn into a werewolf version of himself. After the opening credits, there are advertisements for items like a joy buzzer, a monster fly, a realistic poisonous viper, and Creepy Creature bubble gum before the story begins. "Shapeshifters Anonymous": Fearing that he is a murderer, Robert Weston (Adam Pally) searches for answers for his dilemma at Shapeshifters Anonymous, a support group for were-creatures. The members consist of former Marine Scott Howard (Pete Burris) who can turn into a weretortoise, teacher Irena Reed (Anna Camp), who can turn into a werecheetah, crass and lecherous pervert Andy McDurmont (Frank Nicotero), who can turn into a wereboar, a furry named Phyllis Allenbee (Candy McLeilan) who aspires to be a hippopotamus, and a silent and mysterious man named Ryan (Derek Russo) who comes to every meeting. Robert is discovered to be a werewolf. The group soon comes under attack by the disciples of Santa Claus (Tom Glynn) who is known to the shapeshifters as "Kris Kringle". Kris turns out to be a long-forgotten Biblical figure on a mission to rid the world of therianthropes. Scott explains that in ancient times, Kringle (known then as "Kristofer") was commanded by God to battle Bob, one of His disciples who had been granted the ability to turn into a wolf to devour sinners. However, Bob had eventually become prideful with his killings and needed to be taught a lesson. When he lost the battle, Kristofer felt betrayed and defected to Lucifer, who granted him a pair of therianthrope-killing weapons known as "Satan's Claws". The therianthropes gun down a mob of men dressed as Santa who have come to kill them, then assume their animal forms to deal with any remaining disciples. Kringle himself then attacks the group. Ryan ends up saving them when he transforms, revealing himself to be Bob. This distracts Kringle, which enables Phyllis to decapitate him. Bob rewards the therianthropes with the ability to change at will and maintain control of their animal forms, but is unable to grant Phyllis' wish to become a werehippopotamus. Making a different wish, Phyllis is abruptly taken home by Lil Yachty, who promises to get her $100 million at the bank and make love to her all night. Robert and Irena then begin a relationship, heading to Irena's apartment for sex. There is a brief glimpse at an advertisement for an authentic monkey's paw before showing the Creep wearing a Santa hat as snow falls around him as he wishes a printed "Happy Horror-days" to the viewers.

=== Season 2 (2021) ===
No. overall	No. in season	Title	Directed by	Written by	Original release date
7	1	"Model Kid"	Greg Nicotero	John Esposito	April 1, 2021
7	1	"Public Television of the Dead"	Greg Nicotero	Rob Schrab	April 1, 2021
The Creep is seen inside an empty room, putting a film named Gillman Meets the Mummy into a projector. He laughs as he watches the opening to the movie. "Model Kid": In 1972, Joe Aurora (Brock Duncan), a 12-year-old boy is bullied by Billy Niles (Chris Schmidt Jr.) for being obsessed with monsters and horror movies. Joe lives with his mother June (Tyner Rushing) who is currently battling cancer. One day, Joe's Aunt Barb and Uncle Kevin (Jana Allen and Kevin Dillon) move into Joe's house after Kevin is temporarily fired from his job, vowing to help out due to June's illness. When June sadly ends up succumbing to her cancer in her sleep while watching Abbott and Costello Meet Frankenstein with Joe, Barb and Kevin become Joe's official legal guardians. At one point, Joe imagines Billy getting killed by a version of Frankenstein's monster. Kevin receives a call from his boss Mr. Warren who confirms that his unemployment will be permanent. Kevin quickly becomes (additionally) physically abusive towards Barb and Joe where he lashes out at Barb, because she still has her job and at Joe for not acting like a "normal" kid. After Kevin trashes Joe's monster models and horror memorabilia vowing that no holidays will be celebrated at this house, Joe is visited by his mother's ghost. The visit (which also leaves Joe an issue of the Creepshow comic) convinces him to purchase a new model known as "The Victim", which he uses like a voodoo doll to ensure that his uncle receives his deserved comeuppance. Kevin is eventually ripped apart by the Gillman and the Mummy from Gillman Meets the Mummy as he begs Joe to tell the monsters to stop and that he's sorry. When Barb comes home, she sees Kevin torn in half on the floor. Barb rushes upstairs to find Joe in his Count Dracula outfit watching one of his horror movies. Barb joins him. The final shot shows The Victim, now resembling Kevin, torn in half as the models of the Gillman and the Mummy loom over it. After a brief advertisement of "The Victim" is seen, the next story begins. "Public Television of the Dead": In an homage to both PBS and The Evil Dead, Claudia Aberlan (Marissa Hampton), director of network programming at the WQPS public television station of Pittsburgh (a parody of real life PBS affiliate WQED in the same city), is forced to cancel The Love of Painting with Norm Roberts (a parody of The Joy of Painting) so that Mrs. Bookberry (Coley Campany), the cruel, arrogant, and racist hostess of Mrs. Bookberry's Magical Library (a cross between Reading Rainbow and Lamb Chop's Play-Along) can take the time slot of artist and Vietnam veteran Norm Roberts (Mark Ashworth). Meanwhile an episode of The Appraiser's Road Trip (a parody of Antiques Roadshow) is filming in the same studio. Host Goodman Tapert (Peter Leake) welcomes Ted Raimi onto the show. Ted has brought in the Necronomicon, which he says has been in his family for years, to be appraised. Goodman unlocks the book and reads its ancient incantations aloud, turning Ted into a Deadite. Ted proceeds to kill Goodman, turning him into a Deadite as well. At the same time, the demonic evil sealed within the book is unleashed and promptly runs rampant throughout the studio, killing several employees. The possessed Ted kills Bookberry, also turning her into a Deadite. When Claudia discovers the situation, she, Norm, and Norm's director George (Todd Allen Durkin) set out to find and lock the Necronomicon so that the Deadite trio cannot read the book on a live broadcast, spreading its dark influence to the station's viewers. They succeed. With The Love of Painting back on the air, Claudia and George discuss the incident that occurred during Mrs. Bookberry's Magical Library being viewed a publicity stunt. What they don't know is that two children seen watching the station have become possessed. Transitioning to animation, a miniature devil is seen reading the Necronomicon. The Creep emerges from the darkness and crushes the devil when he shuts the book, placing it on his bookshelf.
8	2	"Dead and Breakfast"	Axelle Carolyn	Michael Rousselet, Erik Sandoval	April 7, 2021
8	2	"Pesticide"	Greg Nicotero	Frank Dietz	April 7, 2021
An animated Creep watches as a house fly buzzes around him. When it lands on his eye, the Creep swats the fly, grabs it, and throws it into a spider web. A spider descends from above and devours the fly as the Creep laughs. "Dead and Breakfast": Siblings Pam and Sam Spinster (Ali Larter and C. Thomas Howell) are the grandchildren of alleged serial killer "Old Lady Spinster". They have inherited the maze-like boarding house that their infamous grandmother operated in 1939, where she would purportedly murder anyone who violated the house's rules. To cash in on the legacy, the duo decide to turn the house into a murder-themed bed and breakfast, but continually fail to generate any reservations. When they research marketing strategies on the Internet, the siblings come across one of the livestreams of Morgue (Iman Benson), an influencer highly knowledgeable in true crime. Pam and Sam invite Morgue to the house. Morgue points out flaws in Pam's stories about their grandmother, challenging the belief that Old Lady Spinster was a homicidal genius. Morgue also uses sophisticated equipment to check the house and its various hidden passages for anything suspicious, determined to discover once and for all whether the grandmother was indeed deranged killer, or just a drunk who lived in a crazy house. During the investigation, Pam grows more and more unhinged as Morgue debunks her beliefs about her grandmother – to the point where she decides to repeat her grandmother's supposed crimes. Pam ends up killing Morgue, but is then killed by Sam. One year later, Sam has revitalized Spinster House by incorporating the recent events into the mythos. While handling a day's profits, Samuel accidentally falls down a trap door. He finds skeletons all around him, proving that his grandmother was a serial killer all along. He sees the trap door closing and futilely shouts help, but fails to draw the attention of the oblivious tourists above. The Creep is then seen in the house's lobby, watching as a portrait of Old Lady Spinster transforms into Pam and laughing maniacally. "Pesticide": Harlan King (Josh McDermitt) is a crass and unscrupulous exterminator who claims he can eliminate any sort of pest, be it insect or rodent. After finishing up a job for (and subsequently being dismissed by) therapist Brenda Lanchester (Ashley Laurence), he is contacted and led to an abandoned factory. Here he is met by Mr. Murdoch (Keith David), a mysterious real estate entrepreneur who plans to tear down the factory and build condominiums on the land. Murdoch shows King that a small community of homeless people are squatting on the property, thus preventing construction. Murdoch has tried and failed to have them removed by normal means multiple times, so he tells King that they are the pests he wants eliminated. Uneasy at killing human beings, King initially refuses only to reluctantly change his mind when Murdoch offers him a briefcase full of money. Later that night, King discretely attempts to poison the squatters' stew, but begins having second thoughts. One homeless man awakens and attacks him causing him to accidentally drop the open bottle into the stew. King is forced to kill the man in self-defense by smashing a bottle of poison in his face. The entire community ends up dying because of the bottle he dropped in the stew. Plagued by guilt, King suffers nightmares and hallucinations where he is viciously mauled and killed by various oversized pests, including a giant rat, an eagle-sized mosquito, and a spider the size of his truck. King comes to believe that Mr. Murdoch is the Devil, with whom he has made a deal. After an emergency session with Brenda, King awakens to find that he has shrunken to the size of a cockroach. Believing him to be an insect, Brenda kills him by crushing and swatting him to death with a rolled-up magazine. She is then visited by Mr. Murdoch dressed in extermination gear, who asks if she has a bug problem before laughing maniacally. The Creepshow comic book closes as the next issue appears.
9	3	"The Right Snuff"	Joe Lynch	Paul Dini, Stephen Langford, Greg Nicotero	April 14, 2021
9	3	"Sibling Rivalry"	Rusty Cundieff	Melanie Dale	April 14, 2021
The Creep, missing an eye, is seen inside an advanced laboratory. He recovers his severed eye and positions it to the eyepiece of a nearby telescope, laughing as the eye watches the Ocula come into view. "The Right Snuff": Set during a period in the future (or possibly an alternate version of the 1960s) where space exploration has advanced significantly, Captain Alex Toomey (Ryan Kwanten) and Major Ted Lockwood (Breckin Meyer) are a pair of astronauts testing an experimental gravity manipulation machine aboard the space station Ocula. They are interviewed through a transmission by HNN reporter Ann Poole (Kara Kimmer). Alex is envious of Ted (who is considered the brains behind the gravity project) and lives in the shadow of his father General Michael Toomey (who happened to be the first man on Mars). Alex starts hearing strange voices and noises aboard the ship including hallucinations of General Toomey. Mission Control representative Sandra (Gabrielle Byndloss) contacts the Ocula to tell the astronauts that the object which had nearly collided with them earlier was actually a probe sent by an alien race known as the Gorangi. Ted has been chosen by the President to establish first contact with the Gorangi. With his maniacal envy mounting and goaded by hallucinations of General Toomey, Alex traps Ted in the gravity machine's chamber, crushing him under the pressure until where his head explodes. When Alex then meets the Gorangi, they scan his mind, discover what he has done, and inform him that his decision has grave ramifications not just for him, but all of humanity. Ted was actually an ambassador to the Gorangi. By overusing the gravity machine to kill Ted, Alex has thrown the Moon out of its gravitational field and put it on a collision course with Earth, dooming the human race to extinction. As he is transported back to the Ocula, Alex watches the footage of his murder of Ted broadcast on HNN as jeers are heard in the distance. As a tearful Ann attempts to respond to the footage, she and Alex witness the Earth and the Moon being destroyed. Alex weeps in shock and remorse as his General Toomey's shadow continues to taunt him by stating that he will never be like him. Transitioning to animation, the Creep is shown floating around the space where Earth once was in a tattered space suit. After laughing maniacally, he proceeds to hold up a Creepshow issue that opens up to the next story. "Sibling Rivalry": Lola Pierce (Maddie Nichols), a dim, vapid, scatterbrained freshman at Manchester High School, believes that her brother Andrew (Andrew Brodeur) is attempting to kill her. She frantically attempts to explain herself to the school counselor Ms. Porter (Molly Ringwald), but ends up getting distracted and tells a long and convoluted story involving a sleepover at the house of her best friend Grace (Ja'ness Tate) and how the sleepover ended with Grace supposedly trying to kiss her in her sleep. After regaining her focus, she goes on to mention how Andrew had supposedly poisoned her dinner, researched medieval weapons online, and tied her up in the basement. While briefly concerned with evidence of possible sexual assault and an oncoming school shooting, Ms. Porter does not believe Lola and dismisses her story as a delusional ploy for attention. When she comes home and discovers her brother creeping up on her with an axe, Lola finally confronts him and demands to know why he is plotting to kill her. In response, Andrew finally reveals the truth to Lola: when she came home from the sleepover, she had become a vampire and killed their parents in a feral, hunger-induced rage. Unwilling to kill his sister and become the last living member of the family, Andrew and Lola ultimately realize that Grace is actually the vampire that turned Lola, prompting Andrew to go after her instead. In exchange, Lola turns Andrew into a vampire as to give him a boost in strength. The next day, Lola visits Ms. Porter who tells her that Grace has gone missing. There is a glimpse of a beheaded Grace on her bed. When Ms. Porter vows to find out what happened, Lola takes the opportunity to bring Andrew in. Her screams are heard as the students of Manchester High School leave for the day. Returning to animation, a lunch lady in the school kitchen discovers the Creep hiding in her pot of food, the latter proceeding to pull her into the pot. He reemerges from the pot and laughs as he shakes the food off an issue of Creepshow. The Creepshow comic book closes as the next issue appears.
10	4	"Pipe Screams"	Joe Lynch	Daniel Kraus	April 21, 2021
10	4	"Within the Walls of Madness"	John Harrison	Story by : Greg Nicotero and John Esposito; Teleplay by : John Esposito	April 21, 2021
An animated Creep is shown holding a mug resembling a severed head up to a tap which proceeds to dispense a large clump of hair and slime. Not paying any mind to the state of his drink, the Creep proceeds to messily drink its contents. "Pipe Screams": Victoria Smoot (Barbara Crampton), an arrogant, heartless, and blatantly racist landlady, hires down-on-his-luck plumber Linus Carruthers (Eric Edelstein) to inspect the plumbing of the most derelict apartment building she owns after receiving numerous complaints on the matter. When Linus discovers that her building has lead pipes despite the fact that children live in it, Linus tells Victoria that he can't fix lead pipes and needs to report the health violation to city hall, but she still forces him to work on finding the root of the problem under the threat of having his business shut down. Desperately needing financial support to repair the damage his deceased brother had done to the plumbing business, Linus is forced to agree to her terms. After doing some digging, Linus discovers that the source of the problem is a drain clog (named by the Creepshow issue cover of this episode as "Cloggy") that is not only sentient, but is also incredibly fast and has an appetite for human flesh as it bites Linus' hand. When one of the tenants named Janet (Selena Anduze) finds out about Cloggy, she manages to save Linus from its wrath and round up the other tenants in a plan to utilize it against Victoria, who they have determined is the real problem with the building. Linus and the tenants, armed with Linus' tools, confront Victoria, leading her to stand over a storm drain. Cloggy's tentacles wrap around her leg and drag her down the drain, devouring her alive and regurgitating one of her bloodied heels. Everyone puts Linus' tools back in his toolbox as Linus takes his leave from the apartment building. Sometime later, Janet's daughter Leila, before leaving for school, places a bowl of food and a drawing near the open pipe where Cloggy lives, implying that she has befriended the creature. Returning to animation, the Creep is seen using a lantern to perform shadow puppets, the shadow puppet itself taking the form of a sinister, tentacled creature before the next story begins. "Within the Walls of Madness": Graduate student Zeller (Drew Matthews), currently incarcerated in a detention hall, describes to his appointed attorney Tara Cartwright (Brittany L. Smith) the set of circumstances that led to his arrest. Zeller had recently worked at "Install-511", a government research facility in Antarctica that studied paranormal phenomena for military application. During a containment breach, he had witnessed a massive, tentacled monster emerge from a portal in the wall and kill his fellow graduate student Mallory (Brooke Butler). After being accused of killing Mallory himself, Zeller discovered that his superior Dr. Trollenberg (Denise Crosby) had been intentionally framing him for the murder as part of a plot to summon "The Old Ones", a race of ancient, primordial, god-like entities, to the Earth so they could reclaim it; she had discovered a strange, bone-like instrument that plays a frequency that opens inter-dimensional portals on an expedition, then gazed into one of said portals, went insane, and submitted to their power. Zeller was forced to kill her when she attempts to summon the Old Ones once again. After the story, Tara does not believe one word of the story, only seeking to get the publishing rights for it and become famous. On the day of his execution, Zeller is allowed to play the instrument Trollenberg found as a last request, proving that he was right about his claim as an Old One emerges and kills all those in attendance, including Tara. The story ends as Zeller warns the viewing audience that Old Ones "come in through the walls" as he laughs maniacally. The final shot shows Tara's book "Our Demons, Ourselves" on the ground. The Creepshow comic book closes as the next issue appears.
11	5	"Night of the Living Late Show"	Greg Nicotero	Dana Gould	April 28, 2021
An animated Creep enters a dungeon, rips a virtual reality headset off a nearby skull, and proceeds to put it on. He begins playing a video game based on Night of the Living Dead, selecting Barbra as his character and getting eaten by a zombie after a few minutes of gameplay. After the opening credits, there is a glimpse of the issue contents before the story begins. "Night of the Living Late Show": Simon Sherman (Justin Long), an inventor in an unstable marriage, creates the Immersopod, a unique virtual reality machine outfitted with hundreds of cameras that acts as a home theater, allowing people to immerse themselves into and interact with the setting, plot, and characters of any movie they want. He uses the Immersopod to escape his rocky marriage to his wealthy wife Renee (D'Arcy Carden), by regularly inserting himself into his favorite movie Horror Express where he giddily interacts with the film's characters Alexander Saxton and Dr. Wells (Christopher Lee and Peter Cushing in archive footage) and begins an affair with the attractive Countess Petrovski (Hannah Fierman), who he's had a crush on ever since he was a child. When Renee eventually discovers that Simon has been using the pod to ignore her and ultimately become unfaithful to her, Renee enters the movie and confronts the Countess about it. When she gets attacked by the film's alien antagonist while trying to report her affair to the Count (George Rigaud in archive footage), Renee discovers that the injuries she sustained in the film have carried over into reality. Utilizing this fact by Simon's next use of the Immersopod after offering him coffee, Renee gets her revenge by switching Horror Express to Night of the Living Dead. She also uses a pair of pruning shears to cut off Simon's thumb and ignores his pleas to turn off the Immersopod, leaving him unable to exit the simulation as the film's zombies move in to devour him. Returning to animation, the Creep is still playing the video game from earlier on his headset, which now incorporates elements from Dawn of the Dead and Day of the Dead. His fun is then cut short when he is pounced on by a zombie who suspiciously resembles Simon as he bites into the Creep's head. The Creepshow comic book then closes.

=== Season 3 (2021) ===
No. overall	No. in season	Title	Directed by	Written by	Original release date
12	1	Mums	Rusty Cundieff	Story by : Joe Hill; Teleplay by : Greg Nicotero & David J. Schow	September 23, 2021
12	1	Queen Bee	Greg Nicotero	Erik Sandoval & Michael Rousselet	September 23, 2021
An animated Creep is shown planting some seeds in a patch of soil. Upon watering them, they grow into large flowers that have skulls replacing their pistils. After the opening credits, there is a glimpse of the issue contents before the first story begins. "Mums": Farm boy Jack (Brayden Benson) is offered by his garden-loving, recovering alcoholic mom Bloom (Erin Beute) to join her on a trip to visit his "mee-maw". This is actually a cover-up so that she can get Jack away from his gun-toting, militia-obsessed, secessionist father Hank (Ethan Embry), who she calls a terrorist and a Nazi. When a bottle of whiskey and a money clip are found in Bloom's luggage, Hank uses the opportunity to wrangle Bloom into his truck under the guise of taking her to the police, in spite of the fact Bloom claims he planted the items there. While Hank's lover Beth (Malone Thomas) watches Jack, Hank and his accomplice Connor (Lowrey Brown) kill Bloom offscreen, then bury her in the garden near the house, claiming that she was committed to rehab. Meanwhile, Jack finds a packet of seeds his mother had stored away and plants them in the garden, but not before he accidentally cuts his hand on some thorns and bleeds onto the soil. Jack discovers that strange flowers have bloomed overnight, flowers that seem to have hair in-between their petals and pistils in the shape of skulls. When Jack finds one of the farm's pigs tangled in vines and rescues it, the vines then grab Jack's arm and squeeze some blood out. The source of the vines is revealed to be Bloom, her dead body having mutated into a zombie/plant hybrid, who reveals what really happened to her son. Taking advantage of this, Jack tricks Beth, Hank, and Connor into being devoured by the monstrous Bloom. The next day, Jack takes Hank's truck to visit his mee-maw, taking some of the flowers that have skull-shaped pistils with him. "Queen Bee": Trinice (Olivia Hawthorne), Deborah (Hannah Kepple), and Carlos (Nico Gomez) are huge fans of famous pop star Regina (Kaelynn Harris). As they argue over who is the bigger fan, Deborah reveals that Regina is nine months pregnant and has gone into labor at the local hospital where her mom (Monica Louwerens) works. As Regina has had an entire floor of the hospital sealed off to keep out the paparazzi, the trio gain entry using Deborah's mom's hospital key card so they can see the baby first, with Carlos plotting to take and sell pictures of either the baby or the father. After tricking the outside security camera, the teens struggle with a security guard (Bruce Anthony Shepperson) and accidentally kill him by pushing him down the stairs. Once inside, the trio discover that the hospital workers have mysterious glowing green eyes. When they find Regina, they witness as she is given an "epidural" that triggers her to transform into her true form: a giant, extraterrestrial, wasp-like insectoid. Regina senses their presence after Carlos photographs her and she gives off a high-pitched frequency that is revealed to be hypnotizing the staff. The frequency also hypnotizes Carlos, allowing Regina to sting him in the forehead and kill him. This prompts Deborah and Trinice to stuff their ears with cotton to protect themselves from Regina's influence. After fending off the mind-controlled staff, Trinice plans to use Carlos' pictures to reveal Regina's secret to the world. Not wanting her favorite pop star's career ruined, even if she is a monster, Deborah turns on Trinice and willingly submits herself to Regina's hypnosis. Sometime later, Trinice is left stuck to the wall of a makeshift hive where the hypnotized Deborah sacrifices her to Regina's "children": large carnivorous grubs that feed on human flesh. The Creepshow comic then closes as the next issue appears over it.
13	2	Skeletons in the Closet	Greg Nicotero	John Esposito	September 30, 2021
13	2	Familiar	Joe Lynch	Josh Malerman	September 30, 2021
An animated Creep is seen digging up a grave underneath the Hollywood Sign. Upon opening the coffin he unearths, a reanimated skeleton notices him and pops out of the coffin to observe him. "Skeletons in the Closet": In a story filled to the brim with movie references, film lover Lampini (Victor Rivera) plans to open "Skeletons in the Closet", a museum that displays the various film props his late father had acquired, hoping to uphold the man's legacy. The crown jewel of the museum is a large collection of actual human skeletons used in various movies (including the skeleton that was used to produce the Creep from the original film) to be revealed to the public on opening day. Before long, Lampini's museum is visited by Bateman (James Remar), a rival prop collector and his late father's nemesis. Bateman informs Lampini's girlfriend Danielle (Valerie Leblanc) that the skeleton in Lampini's collection used for the original Creep was actually excavated from a local cemetery three days earlier and blackmails Lampini into letting him take one of the skeletons in exchange for not turning him over to the police. When a panicked Danielle ends up slitting Bateman's throat with Rosa Klebb's dagger shoes, she and Lampini end up flaying his body, submerging him in a vat of acid, and putting his skeleton among the others in the collection. That night, Bateman's skeleton reanimates and proceeds to kill a showering Danielle in the style of Psycho and later Lampini's assistant Burke (Lucas Godfrey). Before the skeleton can kill Lampini himself, the skeleton of Lampini's father (who became part of the collection himself as per his will) animates as well, dueling and ultimately decapitating his longtime rival. When the museum opens the next day, Lampini has placed Danielle's skeleton in the collection. Much to the disgust of a pair of visitors, Lampini and Danielle's moving skeleton proceed to make out. Nearby, the Creep appears and takes a selfie with his original self. "Familiar": Following a night of drunken partying, aspiring lawyer Jackson (King Bach) and his ditzy, sculptor girlfriend Fawn (Hannah Fierman) visit a mysterious fortune-teller named Boone (Keith Arthur Bolden). While performing a palm reading on Fawn, Boone slips Jackson a note reading "Something bad followed you in here." Later that night, while watching a movie with Fawn, Jackson witness a strange creature lurking in the darkness, observing him intently. The next day while at work, Jackson receives a blank fax message, discovers that the contents of his desk have been meticulously stacked while he wasn't looking, and nearly has a pair of dark, clawed hands reach out at him from a bathroom stall. Following these occurrences, Jackson attempts to warn Fawn that something may be after him, and while she doesn't initially believe him, she gives him a hand-sculpted lamb as a present. Making another trip to Boone's place, Jackson finds an old book that reveals that the entity following him is a familiar, a creature of darkness that attaches itself to a human host, and will do absolutely anything, even kill, to remain tethered to said host. Boone informs Jackson that familiars can't be exorcised, instead needing to be physically removed. He instructs Jackson to draw a sacred circle, place a piece of "innocence bait" (an item that was created without an ounce of negative energy) inside said circle, and trap the Familiar in a "blessed crate" when it comes to collect the bait. The first time Jackson attempts this, the Familiar mimics his dog and tricks him into letting it escape. Trying again with the lamb Fawn made him, the Familiar appears to be mimicking Fawn, who begs Jackson to help her. Not intending to be fooled twice, Jackson ends up pushing the crate into a lake, which drowns whatever is inside. When Jackson returns home, he finds the Familiar waiting for him with Fawn's water-logged corpse, revealing that it had swapped places with the real Fawn. The Familiar proceeds to possess Fawn's corpse, have her shuffle over to Jackson, and ominously tell him that she finally believes him as the story ends. The Creepshow comic then closes as the next issue appears over it.
14	3	The Last Tsuburaya	Jeffrey F. January	Paul Dini & Stephen Langford	October 7, 2021
14	3	Okay, I'll Bite	John Harrison	John Harrison	October 7, 2021
"The Last Tsuburaya": Many decades ago, Ishido Tsuburaya (Joseph Steven Yang), a misanthropic Japanese artist who reveled in the cruelty he would inflict upon humanity, would depict said cruelty in the form of gruesome paintings of ghouls and monsters. While most of said artwork has since been catalogued and become sought-after by collectors worldwide, Dr. Mai Sato (Gina Hiraizumi) of the Ōta Museum of Art recently come into the possession of a long lost Tsuburaya piece, originally hidden in the basement of a monastery at the base of Mount Fuji. Tsuburaya had it written in his will that on the 100th anniversary of his death, the painting (which has not been removed from its crate) would be relinquished to his surviving family, the sole descendant being revealed as Best Buy clerk Bobby Tanaka (Joe Ando-Hirsh). Dr Sato meets with Bobby at the office of her lawyer Mitch Duclon (Kenny Alfonso). Before Bobby can finalize his decision about the painting, immoral tech billionaire Wade Cruise (Brandon Quinn), accompanied by his artist girlfriend Gisa (Jane Fernandez), barges into the meeting and persuades Bobby into selling him the painting for $20,000,000 which he will wire to Bobby's account while claiming that Dr. Sato and the rest of the museum won't be able to provide him with the same amount. At a private unveiling at his penthouse, Wade removes the painting from its crate for the first time, revealing that it depicts a demon-like creature. After describing what it looks like through vague terms, Wade proceeds to burn the painting with a blowtorch to ensure that he is the only one who gets to see it. This act incites the anger and sorrow of Dr. Sato, who insisted the painting was to be hung in the museum and compares Wade's inhumanity to Tsuburaya himself. Later that night, Wade begins seeing the demon (Nate Andrade) from the painting throughout his penthouse. While Gisa believes that the sightings are a result of guilt accumulated from his actions and eventually leaves him, Wade confronts Mitch at his office asking what he did to the portrait that caused the demon attacks causing Mitch to have two security guards throw him out after Wade finds out that he can hurt the demon following another attack. When the demon attacks again, Wade manages to stab the demon in the stomach with a spear. To Wade's shock, the demon turns into Tsuburaya himself, who explains that his seething hatred of mankind had cursed him to remain trapped in the painting and become the very creature he created. In releasing him, Wade has ultimately inflicted the same fate onto himself as Tsuburaya disappears. As Wade begins turning into the demon himself, he impales himself on the spear. During a police investigation where Wade's body was taken away in a body bag and Gisa is being interviewed by a detective, one of Wade's paintings transforms into that of the demon having torn Wade apart. An animated Creep is seen viewing a series of Tsuburaya's paintings in a museum. One of the monsters painted proceeds to leap out of its canvas and pounces on him. Then the next story begins. "Okay, I'll Bite": Elmer Strick (Nick Massouh) is a meek pharmacist who has been serving jail time for euthanizing his terminally ill mother. Despite being a model prisoner during his incarceration one year later, he is denied parole after it is mentioned that he was in an altercation with fellow inmate "Polish Frank" Kowalski (Tony Demil), whom he apparently vowed to "get even" with. The falsified accusation is made by corrupt and abusive prison guard Butcher "Bunk" Dill (Jackson Beals), who happens to be the boss of a small drug ring within the prison. Bunk has kept Elmer from being paroled so he can gather supplies to cook opium with as he regularly works with the prison doctor. Elmer also happens to have a strong fondness for spiders, gathering a small collection of them that he has named after mythical figures and refers to as his only friends, including a rather large spider hidden behind a loose brick in his cell wall. A more easy-going and sympathetic guard named Willis (Glenn Magee) checks in with Elmer and delivers some mail to him, including an anonymous letter praising him for his practices and a parchment scroll from a library in Cairo. While feeding his spiders, Elmer discovers that the large one hiding behind the wall is actually a form of Sekhmet: Egyptian "Mistress of Dread" and that the scroll is the incantation for a sort of ritual involving her. When Polish Frank and another inmate named Bullet rough Elmer up for being late with an opium shipment, the former squishes one of his spiders as a warning. When he goes to squish another spider, it leaps out of the jar and bites Polish Frank in the eye causing Willis to have Bunk take Polish Frank to the infirmary. In response to the incident, the prison warden Director Poppler (Nic Starr) orders Cell Block C to be fumigated which would effectively kill his spiders while having its inmates divided amongst Cell Block A and D despite Willis stating that both cell blocks are already crowded. Though Poppler does apologize to Elmer on what has to be done. That night, Elmer performs the ritual detailed on the scroll in which his spiders surround him and Sakhmet sinks her fangs into his face. When Bunk enters Elmer's cell to assault him, he is soon captured by Elmer who has been transformed into a giant spider version of himself with his face illustrated on its abdomen. The next day, Willis, Poppler, and two guards approach Elmer's empty cell to discover Elmer's clothes and Bunk's corpse inside, suspended in a giant web and sucked dry. The Creepshow comic then closes as the next issue appears over it.
15	4	Stranger Sings	Axelle Carolyn	Jordana Arkin	October 14, 2021
15	4	Meter Reader	Joe Lynch	John Esposito	October 14, 2021
An animated Creep is seen browsing his record collection and pulling out an album titled "Tunes of Terror". He puts the record on his turntable, which produces the sound of a siren singing. He then uses his clawed finger to scratch the record, changing the singing into the sounds of a man being eaten and screaming in agony, laughing sinisterly all the while. "Stranger Sings": Longtime divorcee and gynecologist Barry (Chris Mayers) meets the kindly Sara (Suehyla El-Attar) at a coffee shop and offers to accompany her on her walk home, despite nearly bungling his opportunity to ask her out. After walking Sara home and preparing to leave, he suddenly becomes hypnotized by ethereal singing, prompting him to accept Sara's invitation to invite him inside. After getting some wine spilled on his pants, Barry heads to the bathroom to clean himself up, whereupon he discovers bloody clothes in the hamper and a partially eaten body in the shower. Attempting to leave, Barry is apprehended by Sara and her roommate Miranda (Kadianne Whyte), a centuries-old siren who have worked together to lure Barry into their clutches for a specific ritual they request he perform. The women explain that they want him to surgically swap their vocal cords, as Miranda has grown tired of being a siren and wants to be mortal, and Sara desires the power to have any man she wants. When Barry tries to flee and ultimately attacks Sara, Miranda transforms into her bestial form and aggressively blackmails Barry into performing the surgery by threatening to hypnotize him into plunging a dagger into his brain, which Sara would frame as a suicide, prompting Barry to agree to their terms. Despite mentioning he isn't qualified to perform such surgery (primarily because the women merely chose Barry as they thought he was a pathetic loser who no one would miss), Barry manages to successfully swap the women's vocal cords, to which Miranda graciously thanks him. Sara immediately uses her newfound powers to hypnotize Barry and attempt to devour him. Before she can, she is killed when Miranda stabs her repeatedly with a dagger dipped in a former victim's blood, living up to her promise to let him live if he completed the surgery. After sincerely apologizing for putting Barry through everything, Miranda enters a relationship with him, allowing him to accompany her to a vegan restaurant. "Meter Reader": In a story that parallels the COVID-19 pandemic, the world has fallen victim to a plague that allows people to become demonically possessed. In this dystopian future, Meter Readers, a select group of people with natural immunity to the contagion, travel the world in the hopes of either curing or eliminating the infected, the latter of which can only be done by decapitating them and incinerating their severed heads in the special garbage trucks that arrived. One such Meter Reader, Dalton (Johnathon Schaech), travels to the home of Mrs. Jones (Samantha Worthen), hoping to cure her daughter Mercy (Reagan Higgins), but upon meeting her and scanning her with the Meter (a specially crafted wand that Meter Readers are able to use to detect if someone is possessed), soon discovers that Mercy's mother is the one actually possessed, and engages in a long and grueling battle with her. Three days later, Dalton's family, consisting of idealist wife Maria (Cynthia Devans), optimistic son Mikey (Boston Pierce), and cynical daughter Theresa (Abigail Dolan) become concerned when Dalton does not return home, remembering that his immunity needs to be reevaluated every 72 hours and that he gave them strict instructions not to let him in after 7PM. When Dalton arrives a few minutes after 7 and begs to be let in, Theresa, remembering that her little sister Madeline was one of the casualties of the plague, does not intend to do so and attempts to chop her father's head off. Taking control of the situation, Maria allows Dalton to stay in the cellar until they can get a doctor to test him. Eventually, Mikey wanders down to the cellar, the doors closing behind him. When Theresa attempts to save him, Maria knocks her unconscious. When Theresa awakens, she arms herself and descends to the cellar. She finds her father, who is not only mortally wounded, but who reveals that Maria and Mikey have become infected. The possessed duo corner Theresa, who is ultimately forced to slaughter them. After completing the task, Dalton expresses pride in his daughter and succumbs to his injuries, after which Theresa collects the Meter from his body. The next day, having become a Meter Reader herself, Theresa disposes of her family's remains and leaves home on her father's motorcycle. A voiceover narration from Theresa states that she hopes to continue his work in stopping the plague. The Creepshow comic then closes as the next issue appears over it.
16	5	Time Out	Jeffrey F. Donovan	Barrington Smith & Paul Seetachit	October 21, 2021
16	5	The Things in Oakwood's Past	Greg Nicotero	Greg Nicotero & Daniel Kraus	October 21, 2021
There are advertisements for Horror House items like a caveman, a werewolf, a shrunken head, horrible hands, Frankenstein's Monster, a tarantula, and a Rat in a Box. Then the first story begins. "Time Out": Tim Denbrough (Grant Feely), attends his grandfather Joseph's memorial service. While rummaging through a drawer of his grandfather's old keepsakes, Tim discovers the key to a strange armoire Joseph had acquired in Germany while serving in World War II; the result of raiding a collection of valuables stolen by the Nazis. Tim unlocks the armoire, but his grandmother Catherine (Shannon Eubanks) stops him from going inside, cryptically warning him that time can't be cheated, even if it can be tricked. Ten years later, Tim (Matthew Barnes) has been attending law school in the hopes of passing the bar exam so he can be a great lawyer like his father who died in a car crash aspired to be. Catherine has since died and has donated her husband's armoire to Tim as per her will, including the key for it. When Tim's roommate Saul (Jibre Hodges) invites Tim's crush Lauren (Devon Hales) and several others to the room for a party, Tim oversleeps on the morning of his exam. Remembering his grandmother's note, Tim steps inside the armoire, which has been constructed into a small makeshift study. He also discovers that time is able to mysteriously accelerate inside of the armoire, but also discovers that time is unaffected outside it. Tim utilizes the temporal anomaly inside the armoire for his own benefit, gaining endless amounts of time to study for and pass the bar exam. Over the next several years, he goes onto marry Lauren, buy a house, join a law firm, and become a father to his son Henry (Emerson Bennett). Despite all of the happiness that Tim has acclaimed, it becomes apparent that all of the time he spends in the armoire is physically and prematurely aging him, since he notices his hair falling out and suffers a mild stroke. Lauren is also concerned that Tim is putting much more time into his work than he is spending time with her and a now 9-year-old Henry (David Alexander Kaplan), warning him to stop working himself to death. When the firm continually demands Tim perform complicated tasks (having boasted about how good he is with time), Tim steps into the armoire again, but the key falls out of the hole in his pocket caused by some moths. When Henry finds the key himself and opens the armoire, he witnesses an elderly Tim (Garrett Zehner) collapse into a pile of dust. Shocked and curious as to where his father is, Henry steps inside the armoire himself, also forgetting the key. The armoire's doors close behind Henry as he continues to call for his father. There are advertisements for authentic soil from Frankenstein's castle and a Creep robe. An animated Creep is shown peering out his window to observe a sunny day outside. Disgusted, he goes back inside, sits down, and turns on his television. He proceeds to watch a news program hosted by various duplicates of himself (a weatherman who forecasts disasters, a sports anchor who breaks an athlete's leg, and a head anchor who devours his report) as he smiles wickedly. Then the next story begins. "The Things in Oakwood's Past": In this animated story, news anchors Serese (voiced by Fayna Sanchez) and Clark "Murph" Murphy (voiced by Andy Daly) report on the town of Oakwood, Maine which happens to have a peculiar and morbid history, primarily because of the widely known fact that the town's population mysteriously disappeared in 1821. Field reporter Mac Kamen (voiced by Ron Livingston) and his camera operator Carmella (voiced by Fayna Sanchez) are sent over to Oakwood to cover the story. Mac interviews town librarian Marnie Wrightson (voiced by Danielle Harris) who also happens to be president of the town's historical society. In her interview, Marnie reveals to Mac that she had discovered a collection of journals written by former historian Eli Lester. Utilizing coordinates found in the journals, she and the society have excavated a sinister looking "time capsule" with the year 1821 printed on it buried underneath the local park. Marnie's father Mayor Wrightson (voiced by Mark Hamill) plans to open the capsule before the townspeople during a festival to be held on the 200th anniversary of the day the population disappeared. While presenting a class full of children (all voiced by Kate Thulin) a slideshow of evidence that there was another disappearance of the population in 1621, the slides transition into villagers being mutilated. When Marnie, Mac, and Carmella inspect the capsule closer, they discover a series of primitive illustrations that relate to another disappearance back in 1421, revealing that the disappearance of the population has been a repetitive occurrence caused by a mysterious, malicious entity. They are caught by Deputy Anton (voiced by Andy Daly) who takes them to see the mayor. As Marnie tries to explain to her father that the entity is going to return on the anniversary of the disappearances, he has Anton escort her out. On the day of the anniversary as Mac reports on the scene, Mayor Wrightson prepares to open the capsule. Suddenly, Marnie hurriedly arrives and reveals to everyone present the true story of Eli Lester's journals: Lester's daughter had been murdered by a town elder who was released from jail through means of bribery. As an act of vengeance, he persuaded the town council that they needed what was inside the capsule (previously marked with the year 1621) to keep the 200 year curse at bay which caused the 1821 disappearance in the first place. As Mayor Wrightson had already attempted to open the capsule, he tries in vain to keep it closed while ordering Deputy Anton to get his daughter away from Oakwood. As Marnie is loaded into the squad car, she reveals to Mac that the "capsule" is actually a cage. The capsule then bursts open, unleashing an army of demonic creatures that proceed to slaughter Mayor Wrightson, Mac, Carmella, and all others present. Deputy Anton drives away with Marnie when one of the creatures attacks the car. Marnie is forced to take the wheel as Anton shoots at the creature only to have his torso slashed off. The police car crashes into a tree, causing Marnie to fly through the windshield and knocking her unconscious. When she regains consciousness, she encounters the creature and desperately crawls away from it, apologizing and insisting she didn't know. The rest of the demonic creatures show up, but are forced to let Marnie live as they are unable to cross the town line. Instead, they return to Oakwood and fly back into the capsule. One of the creatures clutches Carmella's camera and descends back into the capsule where the massive demon entity from the illustrations smiles wickedly. Back at the studio, Serese and Clark are completely unaware of what really happened and end their broadcast. Meanwhile, the capsule manages to reconstitute itself as the date on it changes to 2021. The capsule then sinks back into the earth where it is ready to be reopened in another 200 years. The Creepshow comic book closes as the next issue appears.
17	6	Drug Traffic	Greg Nicotero	Story by : Mattie Do & Christopher Larsen; Teleplay by : Christopher Larsen	October 28, 2021
17	6	A Dead Girl Named Sue	John Harrison	Heather Anne Campbell	October 28, 2021
"Drug Traffic": Congressman and presidential candidate Evan Miller (Reid Scott) brings a bus full of US citizens to the US-Canadian border as part of a campaign to illustrate the problems in the US Government's healthcare system and the lack of access to medication, hoping to use the suffering citizens to milk sympathy from eager voters. Inside, Evan meets border security officer Beau (Michael Rooker) who was reassigned to the far north by his superiors in the Border Patrol for his communist views. Beau eventually stops a woman (Mai Delape) from carrying what appears to be foreign drugs that are supposedly needed for her sick daughter Mai (Sarah Jon). Noting that many of the drugs are illegal substances and that Mai is showing symptoms of drug withdrawal, Beau has Mai's mother detained in an interrogation room. While Evan has his cameraperson film Beau's interrogation of Mai's mother for his own political gain, it is revealed that by not taking the medication, Mai ends up transforming into a krasue. She proceeds to go on a bloody rampage, devouring all the citizens inside the office. Upon hearing the commotion and discovering the bodies, Evan and Beau end up having to put their political and ideological differences aside and work together to stop Mai from crossing the border. They manage to mortally wound Mai by hacking her body with an axe, then share a beer after reaching an understanding with one another. Meanwhile, Mai's heartbroken mother, handcuffed to the interrogation room's desk, manages to decapitate her self with a large shard of glass from a broken window. After she dies, Mai attaches her head to her mother's body, then bites her restrained hand off to free herself. With her mother's body, Mai manages to reach Evan's campaign bus hoping to drive it into the US. The Creep opens the bus door for her, eagerly inviting her aboard. In an animated epilogue to "Drug Traffic", the Creep is seen driving Miller's bus into the United States. Mai's krasue form is seen clutched in his hand which is currently stuck out the window of the bus. Then the next story begins. "A Dead Girl Named Sue": In a black and white story set in 1968 during the events of Night of the Living Dead, police chief Evan Foster (Christian Gonzalez) is intent on preserving law and order in the wake of the zombie invasion. He meets and attempts to disperse a vigilante lynch mob consisting of Joe Donovan (Bryan Brendle), the truck driver Carl Jenson (J.R. Rodriguez), Farmer Jeremy (Rey Hernandez), and other civilians who are after Cliven Ridgeway (Josh Mikel), a sociopathic criminal, vandal, rapist, and murderer who has wronged the townsfolk in numerous horrible ways. In the past, Cliven has always escaped legal consequences by boasting that he's the son of Mayor Ridgeway who has often helped him escape justice, but the lynch mob are all too eager to exact vengeance upon him under the guise that the law doesn't work anymore. Foster travels to Cliven's hiding place where he finds the corpse of an elderly lady named Edda who had supposedly turned into a zombie. Upon discovering Cliven and ducking the other zombies, Foster arrests him and drives him to the police station hoping to spare him from the lynch mob's wrath. Inside the squad car, Cliven calls Foster out for continually supporting the law, even when it is crumbling under the zombie attacks as well as vowing that the fact that the courts will never be open again means he will never get thrown in jail. Cliven does end up thrown in a holding cell inside the police station's basement where he is confronted by Foster and the lynch mob. When Cliven remains defiant in the face of the townsfolk he had continuously wronged, the citizens bring in the reanimated corpse of Sue Donovan, the young daughter of Joe whom Cliven had kidnapped, tortured, and killed. Sue's blue hair bows and red ring are the only things colored in this story. They throw her in the cell with him as Foster noted that the medical examiner that Mayor Ridgeway bribed to take a vacation didn't remove her brain. Despite being undead, Sue recognizes her killer and proceeds to tear his throat out. After the deed is done, Foster loses his faith in law and order during these times and leads the mob into finding Mayor Ridgeway so that they can deal with him. The final shot shows the TV that had been broadcasting the zombie attacks explaining to the viewers on how to kill them. The Creepshow comic then closes.

=== Season 4 (2023) ===
No. overall	No. in season	Title	Directed by	Written by	Original release date
18	1	Twenty Minutes with Cassandra	Greg Nicotero	Jamie Flanagan	October 13, 2023
18	1	Smile	John Harrison	Mike Scannell	October 13, 2023
"Twenty Minutes With Cassandra": A video game journalist named Lorna (Samantha Sloyan) comes home after a long day and orders a pizza. While resting, Lorna hears a knock at her door and goes to answer it to find a woman named Cassandra (Ruth Codd) who was being chased by a monster. As Cassandra shoots down Lorna's idea to call 911, Lorna learns that fighting back against her pursuer is pointless. At different points, visitors like a deliveryman (Nick Heffelfinger) and the pizza guy Okwe (Franckie Francois) visit the house and are attacked by the monster (Carey Jones). Afterwards, Lorna finds a message on the inside of the pizza box wanting her to meet it in the back room. When she does, the monster states that it does feel bad for killing the pizza guy and warns her that Cassandra keeps getting people involved. After repelling the creature with a combination of a hairspray and a lighter, Lorna confronts Cassandra about it and the fact that she remembered her from the coffee shop earlier that day. As Lorna accuses Cassandra of squandering any chances of friendship, Cassandra leaves stating that she can have the monster. Once Cassandra is gone, the monster is revealed to be a transformed version of the mouse. Both of them have a brief fight until they get exhausted. While resting, the rat monster reveals that Cassandra had suffered from loneliness and had failed at making friends. Lorna reveals she has her own monster locked inside her coffee table. The rat monster offers to fight Lorna's monster, but she refuses. After Lorna tells the rat monster the difference between a Kaiju and Kaijin, the rat monster states that it is really tired. Lorna then quotes "I know". "Smile": Famed photojournalist James Harris (Matthew James Downden) and his wife Sarah (Lucie Guest) are attending the Photojournalism Association Humanitarian Awards ceremony where James wins the award. Later that night, they are dining outside as a hooded photographer (Roberto Lanzas) comes up to them and photographs them with a Polaroid camera. Afterwards, they follow a trail of different photographs involving moments that have been coming true including one that says "Save Me". James flashes back to San Miguel, Buenos Aires where he had an assignment to photograph a battle there when he saw a boy and the man Gabriel (Mateo Deuma) in the river as Gabriel shields the boy's head by holding it underwater where James was unable to help. After that flashback, Sarah told James that it wasn't his fault on what happened in San Miguel. James and Sarah then head home when they find the next photo involving their son Max (Max Archibald) who was having friends over at his house. Upon finding him alright, James and Sarah see the same Polaroid camera when then emits a camera of Max face down in the swimming pool. Then James sees what appears to be Max face down in the swimming pool as he jumps in. When it disappears, James sees what might be a demon turning to Gabriel as he pulls it in to drown it. Sarah snaps him out of the hallucination where he finds that he actually attacked Max. The Polaroid camera appears again and photographs James holding Max's body. The Creepshow comic then closes as the next issue drops.
19	2	The Hat	Kailey Spear & Sam Spear	Byron Willinger & Philip de Blasi	October 13, 2023
19	2	Grieving Process	Kailey Spear & Sam Spear	Story by : Mike D. McCarty; Teleplay by : Mike D. McCarty and John Esposito	October 13, 2023
"The Hat": An aspiring and struggling horror novelist named Jay (Ryan Beil) is working on a deadline for his next book as he tells his architect girlfriend Astrid (Sara Canning) that his horror novelist icon Stephen Bachman (David Beairsto) never missed a deadline as she mentioned that her firm hasn't given her a promotion yet. When visiting his manager Nicole (Marlee Walchuck), Jay sees various writer artifacts like Ray Bradbury's typewriter, Richard Matheson's pipe, H.P. Lovecraft's Civil War bullet, and Stephen Bachman's Homburg hat which he has never written a story without. Nicole allows Jay to borrow Bachman's hat. When he puts it on, Jay starts writing non-stop. When the hat comes off, Jay is back to normal. Nicole is impressed with the story and wants him to make a sequel to it. Due to Nicole's persuasion, Jay puts the Homburg hat back on and continues writing non-stop. After having the hat taken off, he finds that he can't write well without it. When Astrid sees that the writing is taking away time with him, Astrid takes her leave. Jay then gets a call from Stephen Bachman's representative May Johnson (Kelly Metzger) who states that Bachman wants to meet with him. When they do meet at Bachman Square, Jay finds that Bachman can't talk and is in a wheelchair as May reads his written statements advising him to return the Homburg hat to him which Nicole stole from him. After fleeing, Jay goes back to writing as Nicole calls to tell him that one of his stories just got picked up by Steven Spielberg and Astrid calls to tells him that she finally got the Oppenheimer account. When Jay finds that he can't remove the Homburg hat upon having a nosebleed, he grabs a knife which helps him to remove it painfully. He then discovers a strange creature with spider-like legs. After it bit off one of his fingers, Jay grabs his gun and shoots the hat. Then he finds baby hat creatures in his closet. After Jay shows that he killed the hat creature, Nicole gets her comeuppance when he shoves a baby hat creature in her face. When he goes to visit Astrid, Jay finds her working on architect plans while wearing a pillbox hat. As Jay finds evidence that it is another hat creature, he looks up to see another hat creature on the ceiling. It lunges towards Jay as the story ends. "Grieving Process": Richard (Sachin Sahel) is a chef who has prepared a meal for his wife April (Rachel Drance) whose younger sister Jean (MaeMae Renfrow) refers to her as a "boss lady". Richard and April are planning to have a family. Some hours have passed as Richard has not heard from April in awhile. He soon gets a call from Detective Kiernan (Elfina Luke) who informs him that April has been attacked. He arrives at April's place of work where paramedics are loading April into the ambulance where she has a large gash in her neck and her body has been covered in blood. After April is released from the hospital, she starts behaving differently like regurgitating the food that Richard makes her to saying negative comments towards Jean as a girl named Daisy (Kingston Chan) has a welcome home balloon be given to April. Some days later, Dr. Spence (Rebecca Davis) pays a house call to check up on April as she goes upstairs. When Richard doesn't see Dr. Spence come down, he goes upstairs to find April feeding on her. Finding that April has changed, Richard relocates April to the basement as he covers up April's status when Detective Kiernan calls in. In order to satisfy April, Richard goes around killing random people and making their remains into gourmet meals for her. Jean ends up becoming the latest victim to April. One day as evening approaches, Richard's car is run into by Daisy's bicycle as he brings her home and puts her in the basement. Afterwards, Detective Kiernan shows up having followed Richard upon being suspicious of what's happening at his house. Upon hearing a scream, Detective Kiernan gets Richard to open the door. When she enters the basement, she is attacked by both Daisy and April. It is then revealed that Daisy is a vampire and the one responsible for attacking April enough for her to be converted into a vampire. Richard then proceeds to go satisfy both vampires as April did state that they were going to start a family anyway. The Creepshow comic then closes as the next issue drops.
20	3	The Parent Deathtrap	P.J. Pesce	Erik Sandoval & Michael Rousselet	October 13, 2023
20	3	To Grandmother's House We Go	Justin Dyck	William Butler	October 13, 2023
"The Parent Deathtrap": Lyle VelJohnson (Dylan Sloane) is part of the rich VelJohnson family. His parents Archibald (Shaughnessy Redden) and Gloria (Loretta Walsh) are always criticizing him even when he is unable to go to prom. His parents have spoken to Chester and Viviane Meyes to hook their daughter Violet with Lyle. After catching the family cat Churchill urinating on his bed, Lyle kills Churchhill. After Archibald and Gloria criticize Lyle on how he is dressed for the prom, they find that Violet hasn't shown up yet. Gloria calls up Chester and Viviane about it to learn that Violet withdrew from going to the prom as Archibald and Gloria have different theories about it even after they made a large donation to the Meyers family's company Midwhich Financial. Reaching the breaking point, Lyle kills his parents and disposes their bodies into the lake. Moments later, Lyle starts to see the ghosts of Archibald, Gloria, and Churchill with the former two scolding him for this action. Four years later, Lyle is putting up with the ghosts of his parents. While grocery shopping, he runs into Violet Meyers (Chloe Babcock) who apologizes to Lyle for standing him up years ago as they agree to go on a date. Later that day, Lyle is visited by Special Agents Ella (Andrea Drepaul) and Mann (Ed Chow) who are looking for Archibald and Gloria as Lyle covers up their disappearance. Before departing, Ella and Mann ask him if he has any knowledge about his parents' investment in Midwhich Financial. While walking, Lyle learned from Violet that her parents had operated a ponzi scheme as he covers up how his parents died. After another visit from Ella and Mann, Archibald and Gloria make Lyle's date with Violet sour. Grabbing the sword he used on his parents, Lyle threatened to kill himself only for his parents to state that they are proud of him. After Lyle and Violet get married, it turns out that she has drugged the wine as Violet wanted Lyle to be the victim and that she also killed her parents as the ghosts of Chester (Tariq Leslie) and Viviane (Julie Howgate) show up. As the authorities investigate the lake and find four bodies in it, it turns out during the confrontation between both ghost parents that the VelJohnson's money is in Lyle's name. When Archibald and Gloria scream at Chester and Viviane, Violet dies of fright. The next day as the coroner covers the corpse of a now white-haired Violet, the still-drugged Lyle is on a stretcher as Ella prepares to arrest him for the murders. Lyle admitted that he only killed his parents. Violet's ghost appears stating that she plans to make Lyle's life a living Hell. Archibald and Gloria state to Lyle that he let himself get caught while Chester and Viviane scold Lyle for letting Violet die. Lyle goes mad as the stretcher he's on is taken away with the ghosts not far behind. "To Grandmother's House We Go": A gold digger named Marcia (Keegan Connor Tracy) has married a man named David (David Avalon) because she thought he was loaded. When he died, Marcia finds that she must earn her inheritance by looking after his granddaughter Ruby (Emma Oliver). After Marcia breaks up with her boyfriend Benny (Jason McKinnon) and being called a black widow by Benny's sister Carla (Amanda Huxtable) who works as a diner waitress, Marcia gets a call from David's ex-wife Belinda (Marion Eisman) who is dying of cancer and wants to see Ruby. Seeking an opportunity to get her part in Belinda's inheritance, Marcia packs up his stepdaughter for a trip to her grandmother's house. While driving at night, something appears in the road causing Marcia to crash her car. As Marcia investigates the damage, a werewolf (Jason Bell) attacks Marcia who fights it off with a taser. It returns and makes off with Ruby upon breaking through the sunroof. Benny shows up to help tow Marcia's car back onto the road and states that he'll make contact with the sheriff. As Marcia patiently waits for Benny to pull her car back onto the road, she gets out and finds him dead. Upon getting into Benny's car, she sees Ruby in front of the werewolf. Using the knife she grabbed from the car, Marcia stabs the werewolf repeatedly while ranting that it affected their trip to the house of Ruby's grandmother. When the werewolf dies, Marcia sees that the werewolf was Carla. When they arrive at Belinda's house, Ruby goes to hug her grandmother. When Ruby turns around, Marcia finds that she's turned into a werewolf (Devyn Dalton). Lunging towards Marcia, Ruby quotes "Why Mommy, what big eyes you have! Now we can be together!" She then bites into Marcia's neck as Belinda suffers a heart attack upon seeing this happen in front of her. The Creepshow comic then closes as the next issue appears.
21	4	Meet the Belaskos	John Esposito	John Esposito	October 13, 2023
21	4	Cheat Code	Justin Dyck	Claire Carré & Charles Spano	October 13, 2023
"Meet the Belaskos": The Belaskos are a vampire family. It consists of Chuck Belasko (Brendan Taylor), his wife Helena (Lisa Durupt), and their daughter Anna (Karis Cameron). After a nightmare involving a vampire hunter (Donavon Stinson), Chuck checks up on Anna as their caskets are en route to their new location of Mapleton, Ontario by Fly By Night Movers. Upon arriving at the Belasko family's new house owned by Stoker Realty, the Fly By Night moving crew loads the stuff into the house. Later that night, the Belasko family is doing some yard work when they are confronted by their neighbor Doug Roach (Donavon Stinson) who voices his dislike of vampires. Chuck and Helena attempt to cover it up by stating that they are night professors. Doug's son Alex (Matthew Nelson-Mahood) watches from the window. As the Belasko's continue their life in the neighborhood, Chuck shoots down Anna's suggestion that she should join a 24 hour gym. Anna then changes into her swimsuit and does some moonbathing on the roof. Alex sees her and takes a picture which shows a monstrous appearance that evokes the traits of a humanoid vampire bat. Anna senses the camera sounds and leaps off the roof. Alex goes to check up on her and finds her swimsuit top on the ground. They finally meet as Alex gives Anna her swimsuit top back. Alex proceeds to take Anna out on a midnight tour around Mapleton and they kiss at the park that he calls "Mapleton's Disneyland". Alex and Anna begin a relationship and start having sex. Several weeks later, Doug confronts Alex about his relationship with Anna. Doug then proceeds to tell him that he had been lying about how Alex's mother (Sari Mercer) died. She didn't suffer a heard attack; she was turned by a vampire, buried at her funeral and came to Doug as a vampire. Doug then killed her. Later, Alex watches his dad call some friends of his to join him in a vampire hunt. Alex goes to "Mapleton's Disneyland" to warn Anna as Doug arrives with his friends (Andrew Long, Andrew Nadanyi, Jonathan Vellner and Hugo Steele) to kill Anna. As Alex is wounded during the conflict, Anna assumes her monstrous humanoid vampire bat form (performed by Kelsey Andries) to kill the hunters and bite Doug in the neck. With the sun coming out and Alex seriously wounded, Anna risks getting burned to take him to the hospital. As she drops Alex off at the hospital, parts of Anna's ashes fall on the nearby flowers as she burns up completely. Sometime later, Doug wakes up in a casket bound with chains as it is opened by Chuck and Helena. As Doug finds out that he has been converted into a vampire, Alex appears and stakes his father as Chuck and Helena watch. "Cheat Code": Dave (Connor Wong) and his father Jeff (Lochlyn Munro) are expert video game players. One day, Jeff comes home with the video game Weird Wednesday which Jeff played back when he was a kid. He does't know why all copies of Weird Wednesday were pulled from the shelves and buried in the desert as well as the fact that nobody has made it to the final level. After Dave plays Weird Wednesday, he invites his friends Reina (Hanna Huffman) and Spencer (Nikolas Flipovic) over to play it. Dave later finds out that Jeff has beaten his high score. Reina later tells Dave that she bought a console and a copy of the game where they find a cheat code on the box's lip. Jeff soon give a wager to his son where Dave will take a driving test if he wins and that Dave will spend Friday nights with his father if Jeff wins. Reina later informs Dave that Spencer hasn't returned Reina's console as they find a new character modeled after Spencer. His mother (Kelly Anne Woods) state that Spencer's missing as Reina regains her console. They pass an ice cream truck crash unaware that Spencer was killed by it. When Dave uses the cheat code, he becomes part of the game as he and Reina figure out that Spencer used the cheat code. Dave is soon controlled by his father who is unaware of what he is doing. Reina rushes to Dave's house to warn Jeff. When Jeff gets to the final level, he finds that the boss is an alien (Kyle Strauts) in a crashed spaceship. Reina arrives in time to inform Jeff that he is controlling Dave who is on his last life. With Reina's help, Jeff enters the cheat code that transports him into the game as Reina controls the two-player mode. Dave and Jeff managed to defeat the alien. Sometime later, Dave and Jeff bury the video game as Jeff takes Dave to his driving test as Dave also wants to play basketball with his father. As soon as they have left, the ground starts moving as a blue glow is seen. The Creepshow comic then closes as the next issue appears.
22	5	Something Burrowed, Something Blue	John Esposito	Todd Spence & Zak White	October 13, 2023
22	5	Doodles	P.J. Pesce	Zak White & Todd Spence	October 13, 2023
"Something Burrowed, Something Blue": An old man named Frank (Tom Atkins) writes a letter to his estranged daughter Allison (Kristy Dawn Dinsmore) to let her know that he is dying and that he would like to see her before he dies. At the persuasion of her fiancé Ryan (Curtis Lum) at their apartment, Allison goes to see her father. Upon Allison and Ryan's arrival, Frank works to reconnect with his daughter where it was revealed that they haven't interacted in 15 years which was when Allison's mother had died and Frank had her enrolled in a boarding school. While Frank approves of Allison's relationship with Ryan, he agrees to allow them to have their wedding on his property in three weeks and everything will be theirs when he passes away. When Frank speals to Ryan in private, he takes him to a hidden room that shows a newspaper about a 9.1 magnitude earthquake that killed 1000 people. Frank stated that it was cover-up as he takes him in to the next room which contains a caged pit where a Minhocão lives and is currently in a dormant state. Another condition to Frank's inheritance is that Ryan must sacrifice one wedding guest who won't be missed to the Minhocão as it takes 15 years for it to digest its prey. After talking to Allison while leaving out the Minhocão, Ryan persuades her to have the wedding at Frank's house. As the wedding progresses 3 weeks later, Ryan decides to sacrifice his drunk cousin Daryl (Bernie Yao) to the Minhocão and spikes his drink. Once Ryan pushes Daryl down the pit, he is congratulated by Frank as they share a drink. It is then discovered that Ryan spiked Frank's drink. When Frank comes to and finds himself tied up, Allison had been told of what happened and that the "earthquake" had destroyed Ryan's house where he has a Minhocão. They both proceed to push a bound Frank into the pit. Upon returning to Frank's house, Allison and Ryan find that Daryl escaped from the pit. When midnight strikes, the Minhocão emerges and starts to chase after Allison and Ryan as the story ends. "Doodles": In Seattle, Washington, an aspiring cartoonist named Angela (Anja Savcic) is at Timeless Magazine. She meets fellow cartoonist Sonia (Tina Grant) as she offers her opinion on Angela's art. Angela is then called into the office of Timeless Magazine's CEO Roger Barton (Tyler McClendon) where her high school friend Calvin (David Lennon) works for him. Roger looks at Angela's art and criticizes it. While sulking at home and calling her mother, Angela draws blood on the Timeless Magazine image of Sonia. The next morning, Angela receives a call from Calvin stating that Roger is giving her another chance to provide a cartoon for Timeless Magazine since Sonia was found dead in an accident. This time, Roger is impressed with Angela's art. Roger offers her a lifetime contract in exchange that Angela fires Calvin. She is unable to go through with the idea as Roger dismisses her. While sulking in front of the bartender (Kenny Woods-Schatz) in Timeless Magazine's bar, Angela draws blood on Roger's image as Roger falls from the top floor and dies. After rushing home, Angela starts to put everything together. A few days later, Angela returns to Timeless Magazine with the intent to move back to her hometown as Calvin informs her that he has been made the new CEO of Timeless Magazine by the board of directors following Roger's untimely death where he wants Angela as a full-time cartoonist. When the bartender gives Calvin the stuff that Angela has left behind, he confronts Angela at her apartment later that night asking what she did to Roger. Retreating to her bedroom upon being unable to explain how it happened, Angela draws on Calvin's yearbook pictures as he falls dead outside her bedroom. She then finds that some ink has leaked onto Angela's own high school picture due to her drawing hard enough to rip the page. Upon pulling out a whiskey bottle from her neck, Angela falls dead on Calvin's lifeless body. The Creepshow comic then closes as the next issue appears.
23	6	George Romero in 3-D!	Greg Nicotero	Todd Spence & Zak White	October 13, 2023
23	6	Baby Teeth	John Harrison	Melanie Dale	October 13, 2023
"George Romero in 3-D!": In Pittsburgh, Pennsylvania, there is a struggling bookstore called Booktime that is run by a woman named Sarah (Kyra Zagorsky). Her employers include her son Martin (Graham Verchere) and Dawn (Megan Charpentier). After a call from someone who suggests that she should sell the books at Booktime online, she is visited by her stingy landlord Mr. Cooper (Peter New) who informs her about the new lease that will go into action next week in doubled form. He states that he'll be back with the new lease at the end of the day which they have the option to sign it or shut down Booktime. As Martin does some work on their first-generation computer, Sarah states that they will have to start selling their books online and that she may have to fire Dawn as part of the cut-backs and that there's no other way. When Martin goes to speak with Dawn, she reveals that she found an antique wooden crate from Image Ten containing copies of the comic series Brain Rot. Martin figures out that these comics are the unpublished works of George Romero and one of the issues has a pair of 3-D glasses in them. When Martin puts the 3-D glasses on and looks at the cover, the zombie on it starts moving. When he looks at it again, it has gone. When a customer named Bub (Anthony Moyer) comes in and Martin directs him to the horror section, Martin hears screams as he finds the customer dead and backwards. Martin puts on the 3-D glasses and finds that the zombie (Danny Hospes) from Brain Rot #1 is killing the customer. Martin pulls his mother away from the horror section as he works to warn him and Dawn about what happened. When Sarah and Martin are trapped in the storage room due to a jammed door and the invisible zombie is working to try and target Dawn, Martin uses the 3-D glasses bring out the cartoon drawing of George Romero (Sebastian Kroon) from the comic who learns about what is happening. When Martin mentions about the attacking zombie, George states that he never used the word "zombie" and called them "ghouls" (which becomes a running gag). The ghoul has obtained another pair of 3-D glasses from the book and brings out more ghouls (one performed by Roberto Alejandro Sandoval Santana) as they grab Sarah while Martin rescues Dawn. It is around this time that the 3-D glasses bringing things out of the comics was the result of a voodoo curse from an ex-employee who wanted a higher pay. With not much to write on when Martin suggests a happy ending, George rips off his paper arm and writes one where the 3-D glasses lose their power and the ghouls disappear along with George. When Mr. Cooper returns and demands to Martin and Dawn to get Sarah, he is surprised when Sarah emerges as a ghoul and attacks him. Martin and Dawn leave Booktime as the final shot shows the picture of George Romero who is now holding up his arm. "Baby Teeth": Miranda (Rochelle Greenwood) is the overprotective mother of Shelby (Alison Thornton). Shelby has just had her wisdom teeth removed by the dental nurse (Maya Ford). Upon getting home, Miranda finds that Shelby has done some things beforehand like getting her navel pierced and went to a party with her friend Kaitlyn. Miranda states to Shelby that she is lucky that she isn't kidnapped and keeps her from leaving the house. Shelby also mentions about the day her father left their family. Upon entering the untouched baby room where she raised Shelby, Miranda grabs some iron shears and goes to a rocking chair to look at a photo album that her mother is in. Then she goes to the closet where she places Shelby's removed wisdom teeth inside a box with Shelby's baby teeth. When she walks out of the room, the horseshoe above the door moves out of its position. As Kaitlyn (Micaela Nyland) comes to visit Shelby, Miranda re-enters the baby room holding her iron sheers commenting "iron repels them". Soon, the box of baby teeth and one of the dresses drops from the closet as they combine into a hideous child-like creature (performed by Keith Abuthnot, Mike Fields, and Lucas Godfrey). When Kaitlyn enters to look for the baby teeth that Shelby told her about, she is attacked by the child-like creature. When Shelby asks her mother where her baby teeth are, Miranda reveals that iron protects anyone from the fae and that Shelby's grandmother is gone because she saved Miranda from them. Both of them head to the baby room and find Kaitlyn dead. The child-like fae then attacks Shelby, knocks her to the ground, and rips her jaw off in attempting to take her teeth. Before the fae can attack her, Miranda smashes the box that the baby teeth are in. The fae disappear as Miranda finds a baby within the dress as she quotes to it "You'll always be my baby, won't you"? The Creepshow comic then closes.
