= The Brotherhood of the Rose =

1984 novel by David Morrell

- First edition cover
- Author: David Morrell
- Language: English
- Genre: Spy thriller
- Publisher: St. Martin's Press
- Publication date: May 1984
- Publication place: United States
- Media type: Print (hardback)
- Pages: 353
- ISBN: 0-312-10608-4
- OCLC: 10072253
- Dewey Decimal: 813/.54 19
- LC Class: PR9199.3.M65 B7 1984
- Followed by: The Fraternity of the Stone

The Brotherhood of the Rose is the first novel in a trilogy by David Morrell, first published in 1983. It is followed by The Fraternity of the Stone (1985) and The League of Night and Fog (1987), and a short story, The Abelard Sanction.

== Story ==
The Brotherhood of the Rose tells the story of Saul and Chris, two orphans from Philadelphia. They are adopted by a man named Elliot, who treats the boys like his own children and raises them to become assassins, but when a mission goes wrong for Saul, and Chris is involved in an international incident, they begin to question their lives and their missions, and start to see Elliot in a new light.

== In other media ==
=== Television ===
The novel was adapted by Gy Waldron as Brotherhood of the Rose, a two-part television movie directed by Marvin J. Chomsky. The film starred Peter Strauss as Saul and David Morse as Chris. The cast included Robert Mitchum, Connie Sellecca, and James Sikking.

=== Film ===
In 2007 Warner Bros. acquired the movie rights for a new film adaptation. In 2009 actor Channing Tatum was reported to be one of the stars of the film.
