= The Hundred-Year Christmas =

Book by David Morrell

- Dust-Jacket from the first edition
- Author: David Morrell
- Illustrator: R. J. Krupowicz
- Cover artist: R. J. Krupowicz
- Language: English
- Genre: Fantasy novel
- Publisher: Donald M. Grant, Publisher, Inc.
- Publication date: 1983
- Publication place: United States
- Media type: Print (Hardback)
- Pages: 72 pp
- ISBN: 0-937986-57-7
- OCLC: 11495705

The Hundred-Year Christmas is a fantasy novel by David Morrell, who is best known for being the creator of John Rambo in his earlier novel First Blood. The Hundred-Year Christmas was first published in 1983 by Donald M. Grant in an edition of 700 copies, which were signed and numbered.

== Origin ==
The novel was originally written as a Christmas present for Morrell's two children, and the children in the novel are named after Morell's son and daughter.

== Plot ==
The novel concerns the friendship between Father Christmas, who lives for 100 years, and Father Time, who lives for only one. Each year Santa Claus watches a new version of his friend grow old and die, before being replaced; however, Santa's hundred years is up and it is now his turn to find a replacement. If he fails then no one will be around to take care of the infant Father Time and time itself will stop.

== Reception ==
The Hundred-Year Christmas was nominated for a World Fantasy Award in 1984 for best short story.
