= Christopher Reich =

American author (born 1961)

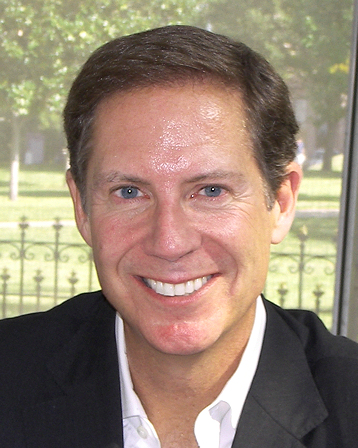
- Christopher Reich at the 2008 Texas Book Festival.
- Born: Christopher Reich; November 12, 1961 (age 64); Tokyo, Japan
- Education: Georgetown University
- Occupation: Author
- Writing career
- Period: 1997–present
- Genres: Legal thriller, crime fiction
- Website: www.christopherreich.com

Christopher Reich (born November 12, 1961) is an American writer.

Christopher Reich was born in Tokyo, Japan on November 12th, 1961. His family moved to the United States in 1965. He graduated from Georgetown University and went on to study business at the University of Texas. He lived and worked in Switzerland as an investment banker before moving to Austin, Texas to author his first novel. Titled Numbered Account, it was a New York Times Bestseller and went on to sell over 1 million copies. Many of his novels have appeared on the New York Times Bestseller list. He currently resides in Southern California.

== Bibliography ==
- Numbered Account (1998)
- The Runner (2000)
- The First Billion (2002)
- The Devil's Banker (2003)
- The Patriots' Club (2004; winner of the 2006 International Thriller Writers Award for best novel)
- Rules of Deception (2008)
- Rules of Vengeance (2009)
- Rules of Betrayal (2010)
- The Prince of Risk (2013)
- Invasion of Privacy (2015)
- The Take (2018)
- Crown Jewel (2019)
- The Palace (2020)
- Once a Thief (2022)
- Matterhorn (2024)
- The Tourists (2025)

== Short stories ==
- '"Assassins" (2006; included in the anthology Thriller (book))
