= David Morrell (writer) =

Canadian-American novelist (born 1943)

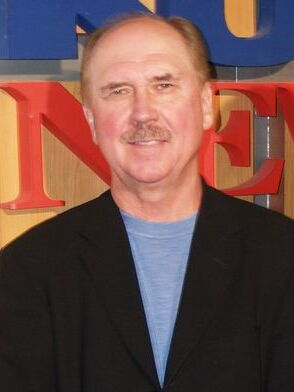
- Morrell in 2009
- Born: April 24, 1943 (age 83); Kitchener, Ontario, Canada
- Citizenship: Canada; United States
- Education: St. Jerome's University, University of Waterloo (BA); Pennsylvania State University (MA, PhD)
- Occupation: Author
- Writing career
- Notable work: First Blood
- Website: davidmorrell.net

David Morrell (born April 24, 1943) is a Canadian-American author whose debut 1972 novel First Blood, later adapted as the 1982 film of the same name, went on to spawn the successful Rambo franchise starring Sylvester Stallone. He has written 28 novels, and his work has been translated into 30 languages. He also wrote the 2007–2008 Captain America comic book miniseries The Chosen.

== Early life ==
Morrell was born on April 24, 1943, in Kitchener, Ontario, Canada, the son of Beatrice, an upholsterer, and George Morrell, a Royal Navy flier. He decided to become a writer at the age of 17, after being inspired by the writing in the classic television series Route 66. In 1966, Morrell received his B.A. in English from St. Jerome's University (affiliated with the University of Waterloo) and moved to the United States to study with Hemingway scholar Philip Young at Pennsylvania State University, where he would eventually receive his M.A. and Ph.D. in American literature.

== Career ==
During his time at Penn State he met science fiction writer Philip Klass, better known by the pseudonym William Tenn, who taught the basics of writing fiction. Morrell began work as an English professor at the University of Iowa in 1970. In 1972, his novel First Blood was published; it would eventually be made into the 1982 film of the same name starring Sylvester Stallone as Vietnam veteran John Rambo. Morrell continued to write many other novels, including The Brotherhood of the Rose, the first in a trilogy of novels, which was adapted into a 1989 NBC miniseries starring Robert Mitchum. He gave up his tenure at the university in 1986 in order to write full-time. In 1988 he received the Horror Writers Association award for best novella; Orange Is for Anguish, Blue for Insanity.

Despite John Rambo being killed at the end of Morrell's source novel, Morrell wrote the novelization of Rambo: First Blood Part II, and explained in the preface that he was bringing the character back to life.

Morrell is the co-president of the International Thriller Writers organization.

== Awards and accolades ==
Morrell was presented with the 2009 ThrillerMaster Award from the ITW.

== Personal life ==
Morrell's teenaged son Matthew died of Ewing sarcoma, a rare form of bone cancer, in 1987. In 2009 his granddaughter died of the same form of cancer. The trauma of his loss influenced Morrell's work, in particular in his creative fiction memoir about Matthew, Fireflies. The protagonist of Morrell's novel Desperate Measures also experiences the loss of a son.

Morrell is a graduate of the National Outdoor Leadership School for wilderness survival as well as the G. Gordon Liddy Academy of Corporate Security. He is also an honorary lifetime member of the Special Operations Association and the Association of Former Intelligence Officers.

According to his website, he has been trained to handle firearms, crisis negotiation, assuming identities, executive protection, and defensive driving, among numerous other action skills that he describes in his novels. He earned an FAA licence to pilot his own small plane as part of research for his 2009 novel, The Shimmer.

Morrell became an American citizen in 1993. He lives in Santa Fe, New Mexico.

== Bibliography ==
=== Rambo series ===
- First Blood (1972) ISBN 0-446-36440-1
- Rambo: First Blood Part II (1985) - novelization of the film of the same name ISBN 0-515-08399-2
- Rambo III (1988) - novelization of the film of the same name ISBN 0-515-09333-5

=== The Abelard Sanction series ===
- The Brotherhood of the Rose (1984) ISBN 0-449-20661-0
- The Fraternity of the Stone (1985) ISBN 0-449-20973-3
- The League of Night and Fog (1987) ISBN 0-449-21371-4
- The Abelard Sanction (short story)
  - in Thriller: Stories To Keep You Up All Night (2006) ed. James Patterson ISBN 1-74116-335-8

=== Creepers series ===
- Creepers (2005) ISBN 1-59315-357-0
- Scavenger (2007) ISBN 1-59315-483-6

=== Thomas De Quincey series ===
- Murder as a Fine Art (2013) ISBN 0-316-21678-X
- The Opium Eater: A Thomas De Quincey Story (short story) (2015)
- Inspector of the Dead (2015) ISBN 0-316-32393-4
- Ruler of the Night (2016) ISBN 978-0-316-30790-1

=== Other fiction ===
- Testament (1975) ISBN 0-446-69191-7
- Last Reveille (1977) ISBN 0-446-36442-8
- The Totem (1979) ISBN 0-446-36446-0
- Blood Oath (1982) ISBN 0-312-95345-3
- The Hundred-Year Christmas (1983) - illustrated by R. J. Krupowicz ISBN 0-937986-57-7
- Fifth Profession (1990) ISBN 1-59737-769-4
- The Covenant of the Flame (1991) ISBN 0-446-36292-1
- Assumed Identity (1993) ISBN 0-446-60070-9
- Desperate Measures (1994) ISBN 0-446-60239-6
- The Totem (1994) - unabridged ISBN 0-446-36446-0
- Extreme Denial (1996) ISBN 0-446-60396-1
- Double Image (1998) ISBN 0-446-60696-0
- Black Evening (short stories) (1999) ISBN 0-446-60864-5
- Burnt Sienna (2000) ISBN 0-446-60960-9
- Long Lost (2002) ISBN 0-446-61194-8
- The Protector (2003) ISBN 0-446-61403-3
- Nightscape (short stories) (2004) ISBN 0-7553-2174-X
- The Spy Who Came for Christmas (2008) ISBN 1-59315-701-0
- The Shimmer (2009) ISBN 1-59315-580-8
- The Naked Edge (2010) ISBN 1-937760-22-7

=== Non-fiction ===
- John Barth: An Introduction (1976) ISBN 0-271-01220-X
- Fireflies (1988) ISBN 1-937760-29-4
- Lessons from a Lifetime of Writing: A Novelist Looks at His Craft (2002) ISBN 1-58297-270-2
- The Successful Novelist: A Lifetime of Lessons about Writing and Publishing (2008) ISBN 978-1-4022-1055-6

=== Comics ===
- Captain America: The Chosen (2007–2008)
- The Amazing Spider-Man #700.1 & 700.2 (2013–2014)
- Savage Wolverine #23 (2014)

== See also ==
- List of University of Waterloo people
