= The Fifth Profession =

1990 novel by David Morrell

- Author: David Morrell
- Publisher: Warner Books
- Publication date: May 21, 1990
- ISBN: 0446667587

The Fifth Profession is a 1990 novel by Canadian-American writer David Morrell. It features the characters Savage and Akira, executive protectors – "no mere bodyguard[s] but ... state-of-the-art defender[s]", an occupation also known as the "fifth profession".

== Plot ==
Savage and Akira meet − seemingly for the first time − by Savage being dispatched by a Joyce Stone to liberate her sister, Rachel, whom Akira is guarding against that eventuality. Their brief clash triggers off memories of a previous meeting, where each believed he saw the other die in the course of a prior mission of protection together; memories that are quite obviously false, but that both believe to be entirely real. The two join together to uncover a string of other falsified memories, taking Rachel Stone with them – thus fulfilling both protectors' missions; Savage's to retrieve her, and Akira's to protect her.

This is a phenomenon that Savage identifies as jamais vu, a familiar situation not recognized by the observer (this is considered the opposite of déjà vu). In the book, the occurrence of this phenomenon is explained by the discovery of evidence of brain surgery performed on both men, entailing a scarring of the temporal lobe of the brain, or the amygdala hippocampal area by an electrode inserted through the skull -– a process similar to that used to treat epilepsy – while both men were subjected to a series of hypnosis and dramatic re-enactments of the false memories.. The process served to 'delete' Savage's and Akira's memories, and supplant them with falsified ones.

== Title ==
At the beginning of the book, Morrell explains the title of the work:

No single historical event marks the origin of Savage's profession. The skill to which he devoted himself has its antecedents prior to fact in the haze of myth. At the start, there were hunters, then farmers, then with something to be gained by barter, prostitutes and politicians. Given some debate about precedence, those are the first four human endeavours. But as soon as something can be gained, it must be protected. Hence Savage's[sic] – the fifth – profession. Although his craft's inception has not been documented, two incidents illustrate its valiant traditions.

Morrell then goes on to cite these two particular events; the Japanese tale of the Forty-seven rōnin, telling of the honor and devotion of the bodyguards of a Lord Asano, a daimyō or minor lord, even beyond his death; and the Battle of Maldon, in particular the Anglo-Saxon poem of the same name, detailing the unfailing loyalty of the comitatus, or household guard, of a local lord, Byrhtnoth. The common theme – of protectors, and their loyalty to their masters – is one to which both Savage and Akira intimately relate.
