= James Grippando =

American novelist, lawyer (active 1976– )

- Born: Waukegan, Illinois, U.S.
- Occupation: Novelist
- Writing career
- Period: 1994–present
- Genres: Crime fiction Legal thriller Young adult
- Notable awards: Harper Lee Prize
- Website: www.jamesgrippando.com

James Grippando is an American novelist and lawyer best known as the 2017 winner of the Harper Lee Prize for Legal Fiction.

== Biography ==
James Grippando was born in Waukegan, Illinois and raised in Northern Illinois. After graduating from Antioch Community High School, class of 1976, he earned his undergraduate degree from the University of Florida, where he graduated second his class and was selected the "Outstanding Graduate." He eared his J.D. from the University of Florida, where he served as Executive Editor of the Law Review.

In his first job out of law school Grippando served as law clerk to the Honorable Thomas A. Clark, United States Court of Appeals for the Eleventh Circuit in Atlanta. There and in private practice Grippando worked on a number of appeals in death penalty cases, an experience that later served him in writing his first published novel, The Pardon. From September 1984 to September 1996, Grippando was a trial lawyer in Miami. In a David vs. Goliath legal battle that lasted seven years, Grippando served as lead counsel on behalf of Florida chicken farmers in a case that was "the catalyst for wholesale change in the $15 billion-a-year [poultry] industry."

As a lawyer, Grippando wrote numerous scholarly articles. In the late 1980s, he shifted to creative writing, but his first attempt at fiction was never published. A near arrest in a case of mistaken identity sparked an idea for a new novel about a man accused of a murder that he may not have committed. Grippando's first published novel, The Pardon, was released in hardcover in September 1994, where he first introduced the character Jack Swyteck, a Miami criminal defense lawyer. Grippando wrote one more novel while still practicing law: The Informant (October 1996.) He then left the law to write full-time, and a string of novels followed. There are now twenty novels in the Jack Swyteck series: The Pardon (1994); Beyond Suspicion (2002); Last to Die (2003); Hear No Evil (2004); Got the Look (2006); When Darkness Falls (2007); Last Call (2008); Born to Run (2008); Afraid of the Dark (2011); Blood Money (2013), Black Horizon (2014), Gone Again (2016), Most Dangerous Place (2017), A Death in Live Oak (2018), The Girl in the Glass Box (2019), The Big Lie (2020), Twenty (2021), Goodbye Girl (2024), Grave Danger (2025), and The Right to Remain (2026). Several of Grippando's novels feature Jack's wife, FBI undercover agent Andie Henning, without Jack: Under Cover of Darkness (2000); Money to Burn (2010); Need You Now (2012) and Cash Landing (2015).

Leapholes, Grippando's first novel for young adults, was also the first novel for young readers ever to be published by the American Bar Association. That same year (2006), Grippando's first short story, Operation Northwoods, was published in an anthology (Thriller: Stories to Keep you Up at Night Thriller (book)) with other top thriller writers. His first novella, The Penny Jumper, was published in 2016. His first play, Watson, about IBM founder Thomas J. Watson Sr., made its world premiere at GableStage in Coral Gables Florida in 2019. His first radio play, With L, earned commendation in the BBC International Radio Playwriting Competition 2020.

Grippando writes outdoors at his south Florida home, and most of his novels are set in Florida, chiefly in Miami. He writes novels of suspense in the genre of crime fiction, including psychological thrillers and legal thrillers, many of which draw upon his experiences as a trial lawyer. Since 2002 he has served as "Counsel" at Boies Schiller Flexner LLP, a national law firm founded by trial lawyer David Boies. He is an adjunct professor of law at the University of Miami School of Law, where he teaches "The Law & Lawyers in Modern Literature." Grippando's novels have been published in twenty-eight languages: Bulgarian, Czech, Chinese (simplified), Croatian, Dutch, English, Estonian, Finnish, French, German, Hebrew, Hungarian, Italian, Japanese, Korean, Latvian, Norwegian, Polish, Portuguese (Brazil), Romanian, Russian, Slovakian, Spanish, Serbian, Swedish, Thai, Turkish, and Ukrainian.

Grippando's twenty-fourth novel, Gone Again, was the 2017 winner of the Harper Lee Prize for legal fiction.

== Bibliography ==
=== Fiction ===
Jack Swyteck series

- The Pardon (1994)
- Beyond Suspicion (2002)
- Last to Die (2003)
- Hear No Evil (2004)
- Got the Look (2006)
- When Darkness Falls (2007)
- Last Call (2008)
- Born to Run (2008)
- Afraid of the Dark (2011)
- Blood Money (2013)
- Black Horizon (2014)
- Gone Again (2016)
- Most Dangerous Place (2017)
- A Death in Live Oak (2018)
- The Girl in the Glass Box (2019)
- The Big Lie (2020)
- Twenty (2021)
- Goodbye Girl (2024)
- Grave Danger (2025)
- The Right to Remain (2026)
- Shadow Jury (2027)

Andie Henning series

- Under Cover of Darkness (2000)
- Money to Burn (2010)
- Need You Now (2012)
- Cash Landing (prequel featuring an appearance by Jack Swyteck, 2015)

Stand-Alones

- The Informant (1996)
- The Abduction (1998)
- Found Money (1999)
- A King's Ransom (2001)
- Leapholes (2006) (young adult novel)
- Lying with Strangers (2007)
- Intent to Kill (2009)
- Cane and Abe (2015)
- The Penny Jumper (2016) (novella)
- Code 6 (2023)

=== Short stories ===
- "Operation Northwoods" (2006, Thriller, a collection of 30 short stories from International Thriller Writers Association, edited by James Patterson)
- "Death, Cheated" (The Prosecution Rests (Little, Brown 2009)), anthology of short stories from Mystery Writers of America, edited by Linda Fairstein
- "Green Eyed Lady," (The Strand Magazine) (2010).

== Awards ==
- 2005 Distinguished Author Award, University of Scranton.
- 2007 Benjamin Franklin Award Finalist (Leapholes)
- 2010 Florida Book Awards Bronze Medal (Money to Burn)
- 2017 Harper Lee Prize Winner (Gone Again)
