= The Totem =

1979 novel by David Morrell

First edition (publ. M. Evans and Company)

The Totem is a horror novel by David Morrell, first published in 1979. It was Morrell's fifth published book, preceded by three novels and one work of non-fiction. It was the author's first foray into horror, a genre that he would not revisit until Creepers in 2005.

== Story ==
The novel takes place in a small Wyoming community called Potter's Field. Though normally a quiet town, Sheriff Nathan Slaughter suddenly finds himself confronted by inexplicable outbreaks of mindless violence, several bodies and the discovery of a new kind of viral infection that appears to be closely related to rabies, though it works much quicker. Along with the town coroner and an alcoholic reporter that he befriended years ago in Detroit, Slaughter attempts to save the townspeople from the cruel disease, which turns its victims into raving, uncontrollable murderers.

== Publishing history ==
In 1994 Morrell reissued The Totem in an unexpurgated version. In his foreword he states that when he submitted the original manuscript to his then-publisher his editor demanded that he simplify and shorten the book. As Morrell had not yet achieved bestseller status (the book was published three years before his 1972 debut novel First Blood was transformed into the enormously successful Sylvester Stallone film), he acquiesced and rewrote the manuscript into a shorter, truncated edition and then simply forgot about the original version. Morrell claims that he came across the original book in the early 1990s and decided to publish it and take the first edition out of circulation.
