= Thriller (anthology) =

2006 short story collection by James Patterson

- Author: James Patterson
- Language: English
- Genre: Thriller
- Publisher: Mira Books
- Publication date: June 2006
- Publication place: United States
- Media type: Print (paperback)
- Pages: 552 pp
- ISBN: 1-74116-335-8
- OCLC: 156187994

Thriller: Stories to Keep You Up All Night (2006) is a compilation of 30 thriller short stories edited by James Patterson.

== Short stories with descriptions ==
=== "James Penney's New Identity" by Lee Child ===
In Laney, California, a man named James Penney is fired after 17 years on the job. Infuriated, James burns down his house and starts a new life. However, the fire had spread across the neighborhood, and James is wanted for arson. Now a wanted criminal, James meets up with a military cop, Jack Reacher, who sympathises with him and helps him out of his predicament.

=== "Operation Northwoods" by James Grippando ===
A massive fire across a US Naval Station in Cuba originates from a plane crash believed to contain a large quantity of napalm. The area of the naval station on fire housed suspected terrorists. In Miami, Florida, the FBI receives an anonymous tip that a man named Jack Swyteck, a defense lawyer, is in danger. A SWAT team is sent to investigate his home only to find that Jack is alone and perfectly safe. The leader of the SWAT team informs Jack the fire in Cuba was started when a plane piloted by one of Jack's clients, Jean Saint Preux, crashed. Jack informs the SWAT team leader that Jean mentioned an "Operation Northwoods".

=== "Kill Zone" by Robert Liparulo ===
Police sniper Byron Stone watches through a rifle's scope, a man in an apartment terrorizes a mother and her two children. He fears missing his target, granting the hostage-taker a final opportunity to complete his dirty work.

=== "Epitaph" by J. A. Konrath ===
A paid killer, Phin, is hired by a Chinese man named Ti to avenge his daughter, Sunny Lung, who was killed by a gang known as the 'Kings'. Phin, after having received a beating from the Kings, breaches the gang's headquarters and kills the men responsible for Sunny's death, using Sunny's cremated remains as bullets.

=== "The Face In the Window" by Heather Graham ===
A dangerous storm rips through Florida, where an evacuation notice has been spread throughout part of the state. Beth Henson, a woman whose husband, Keith has been sent to rescue an elderly woman, stays in her house during the evacuation progress. A man stumbles in seeking shelter, but Beth suspects that he is a serial killer. Keith enters the elderly woman's home, only to find that she is unconscious inside the trunk of her car. A youth found around the woman's house claims to be her nephew; Keith also suspects that he is a serial killer. Back in the house, Beth attacks her guest with a frying pan. She flees to the shed where the youth catches her, holding a knife to her neck. Keith arrives at the house and whilst searching for the youth, bumps into the man who was hit by a frying pan. Keith locks him in a room and exits to the shed. The three enter the house where the man ambushes them and takes Beth hostage. Beth retaliated and attacked the man again with a frying pan, leaving him unconscious.

=== "Empathy" by James Siegel ===
The author, whose name is unmentioned, has an affair with a hotel masseuse, Kelly. Kelly tells him she is an empath, someone who can sense one's emotions by touch. She also tells him of a man in whom she sensed a very strong evil, and that the man is a pedophile. The author is very moved, because he feels responsible for his younger brother's suicide, because the narrator had not said anything about the pedophile priest who, it is implied, abused both of them. He seeks out the man Kelly mentioned, and after killing him, meets with a friend of Kelly's, who informs the narrator that Kelly was divorced, was a drug addict, and had poisoned her son against his father. The narrator, realizing he had killed Kelly's innocent ex-husband, set out to kill Kelly and avenge the man he had wrongfully killed. In the end it is implied that the author commits suicide.

=== "Kowalski's In Love" by James Rollins ===
Seaman Joe Kowalski swims onto a small island after his boat is accidentally blown up by a gas leak. He is met by Dr. Shay Rosauro, who informs him that the island is infected with a transgenic rhabdovirus and is scheduled to be bombed by the Brazilian Navy at 0900 hours—in less than half an hour. Shay had entered the island to retrieve the only antidotes to the virus; an evac helicopter will pick her up at 0855 hours. However, the island is scattered with booby traps, and it isn't long until Shay falls into one, breaking her leg. Kowalski offers to retrieve the antidotes himself, whilst Shay makes for the evac dropsite. Shay reluctantly agrees but becomes treed by apes on her way. Kowalski encounters Gabriella Salazar, who has already collected the antidotes. Kowalski shoots and killed Gabriella in self-defense and retrieves the antidotes. Kowalski could escape on the evac chopper, but opts not to, as it will lift off the island on schedule, with or without Shay. Kowalski rescues Shay, and they escape on the water vehicle that was meant for Gabriella.

=== "The Hunt For Dmitri" by Gayle Lynds ===
Dmitri Garnitsky is on the hitlist of a professional assassin, the Carnivore, who has a reputation for never failing. After being tipped off, Dmitri leaves his home, but he is met by the Carnivore, and later Oleg Olenkov, the man who hired the Carnivore. The Carnivore is angered by Olenkov's demands and shoots him in the chest, leaving Dmitri unharmed. Many years later, Olenkov catches up with the Carnivore's daughter, Liz Sansborough, a psychologist. Masquerading as "Arkady Albam", Olenkov befriends Sansborough, lures her to his apartment, and tells her a false story of how he got shot. He ultimately reveals himself to be Olenkov, and moments later Dmitri enters the apartment, shocked that his attempted killer is there. The three of them engage in a violent struggle, resulting in one of their being rendered unconscious and harmless.

=== "Disfigured" by Michael Palmer & Daniel Palmer ===
Dr. George Hill and his ex-wife Maura Hill receive a letter that their son has been kidnapped; if they want to see him alive again, George must inject isopropyl alcohol in the face of his celebrity client, Audra Meadows, during surgery, disfiguring her permanently. Maura sneaks into the Meadows' household, hoping to rescue her son. After witnessing Audra being verbally abused and then raped by her husband, Alec, Maura searches the house without success. Maura visits another property, this one owned by A.R. Meadows, only to find the property is owned by Ambrose Meadows. Maura then goes in search of Dr. Simon Rubenstein, the psychiatrist who had prescribed Audra's pills. Maura then discovers that Audra had threatened Maura's son's life herself, unbeknownst to Alec, believing that if she were disfigured, Alec would reject her, and then she'd be free from his mental and sexual abuse. Just before the surgery, Maura and Dr. Rubenstein confront Audra.

=== "The Abelard Sanction" by David Morrell ===
Saul Grisman and his wife, Erika, are on a hunt to kill Habib, a terrorist who had killed their son. Following Habib to a neutral safe house known as the Abelard Sanction, Erika reveals she has secured sticks of dynamite around her waist, which if detonated threatens the lives of Habib and her husband. She offers Habib a chance to escape, allowing him a 24-hour head start. The dynamite is then revealed to be a fake, then the detonator triggers explosives on both sides of Habib's vehicle, killing him.

=== "Falling" by Chris Mooney ===
Marlena, an FBI agent, is sent to plant a transmitter on an ex-FBI agent, Malcolm Fletcher. Fletcher is one of the FBI's Most Wanted after killing three of the FBI's federal agents. The assignment went horribly wrong, and now Marlena is ordered to disengage, escaping the island by boat. One of her co-workers, Barry Jacobs, revealed that he worked for someone else who wanted the FBI out of the way. After killing FBI Special Agent Owen Lee, Jacobs paralyzed Marlena but was tied up by Fletcher, who saved Marlena and left her with a helpless Jacobs.

=== "Success of a Mission" by Dennis Lynds ===
Captain Paul Hareet and Lieutenant Greta Frank are assigned to retrieve information on where an Arabic country's ammunition is kept, three days before the country attacks. The couple are disguised as American tourists. After retrieving the information, Hareet was shot and killed whilst attempting to escape, but managed to supply the information to the American Defense.

=== "The Portal" by John Lescroart & M. J. Rose ===
Lucy Delrey, a nymphomaniac, is in therapy confessing that she has no feelings for anything. After two months of therapy, she realizes that her loss of emotion originated with the disappearance of her childhood hero, Frank Millay. She decides to find out where he lives and seduce him, exposing him to his wife for leaving her when she was a kid. Frank strangled and killed her, saying that he couldn't let anyone 'find out'. The killing was recorded on video and Frank was arrested.

=== "The Double Dealer" by David Liss ===
Fisher, an aging highwayman, tells the story of an encounter with another highwayman, Benjamin Weaver, back in the 1710s. Weaver and his friend, Thomas Lane, are attacked by Fisher and his crime partner, Ruddy Dick. After Lane was knocked out, Weaver beheaded Dick, Fisher grabbed the money and both fled the scene. A year later, Fisher befriends a man known as Farting Dan. Whilst robbing an equipage, Weaver kills Dan, but is shot by Fisher. Fisher returns home with the equipage's horseman, Phillip, trying to get him to pick a valuable lock. Phillip revealed himself to be Weaver, and that in their encounter a year ago Fisher had mistaken Lane for Weaver and vice versa. Lane, however, is not dead; the gun Fisher used was faulty and all the entire robbery deaths were staged. Farting Dan entered and the two of them retrieved the boxes.

=== "Dirty Weather" by Gregg Hurwitz ===
A bar in a small, ransacked town is under armed robbery. Rick Jacobs manages to scare off the robber who was after a load of cash in a safe. After pocketing the cash, Jacobs and a maid who worked at the bar escaped the road-blocked town. Jacobs reveals he faked the robbery scene with his crime partner, knocking the maid out and stealing the money.

== Other short stories in the collection ==
- "Spirit Walker" by David Dun
- "At the Drop of a Hat" by Denise Hamilton
- "The Other Side of the Mirror" by Eric Van Lustbader
- "Man Catch" by Christopher Rice
- "Goodnight, Sweet Mother" by Alex Kava
- "Sacrificial Lion" by Grant Blackwood
- "Interlude at Duane's" by F. Paul Wilson
- "The Powder Monkey" by Ted Bell
- "Surviving Toronto" by M. Diane Vogt
- "Assassins" by Christopher Reich
- "The Athens Solution" by Brad Thor
- "Diplomatic Constraints" by Raelynn Hillhouse
- "The Devil's Due" by Steve Berry
- "The Tuesday Club" by Katherine Neville
- "Gone Fishing" by Douglas Preston & Lincoln Child
