= Double Image (novel) =

Novel by David Morrell

- Author: David Morrell
- Publisher: Grand Central Publishing
- Publication date: May 1, 1998
- ISBN: 978-0-446-51963-2

Double Image is a novel by David Morrell, first published in 1998 by Warner Books.

== Plot summary ==
Double Image is a noir thriller from Morrell set in modern-day Los Angeles. It tells the story of a war photographer named Mitch Coltrane, who decides to give up photographing atrocities after an assignment in Bosnia nearly costs him his life. While at home recovering from a gunshot wound from the above-mentioned job, he sees an advertisement in a magazine stating that a legendary photographer from the 1920s and 30's named Randolph Packard will be giving an exhibit of his work. Coltrane attends the exhibit and finds himself face-to-face with Packard, now a sickly old man, who takes a liking to Coltrane and invites him to his private residence the next day. Coltrane and Packard decide to collaborate on a job, in which Coltrane will go to various locations throughout the L.A. area and take photographs of the very same houses which Packard has photographed over half a century ago, in order to show how much Los Angeles has changed over the decades. But before Coltrane can begin his work Packard dies, leaving him a collection of photographs. Coltrane begins the assignment and quickly becomes fascinated by one of the houses in Packard's photographs. Upon finding the house he discovers that it has been maintained in perfect condition with no renovations over the years and he promptly decides to purchase it, since Packard owned the residence and it is now for sale. He also makes a discovery in the house's basement: a hidden vault filled with thousands of pictures of a beautiful young woman. Along with his girlfriend Jennifer, Coltrane begins to try to discover who the beautiful woman was and finds himself enmeshed in a web of deceit and treachery.
