= J. A. Konrath =

American writer (born 1970)

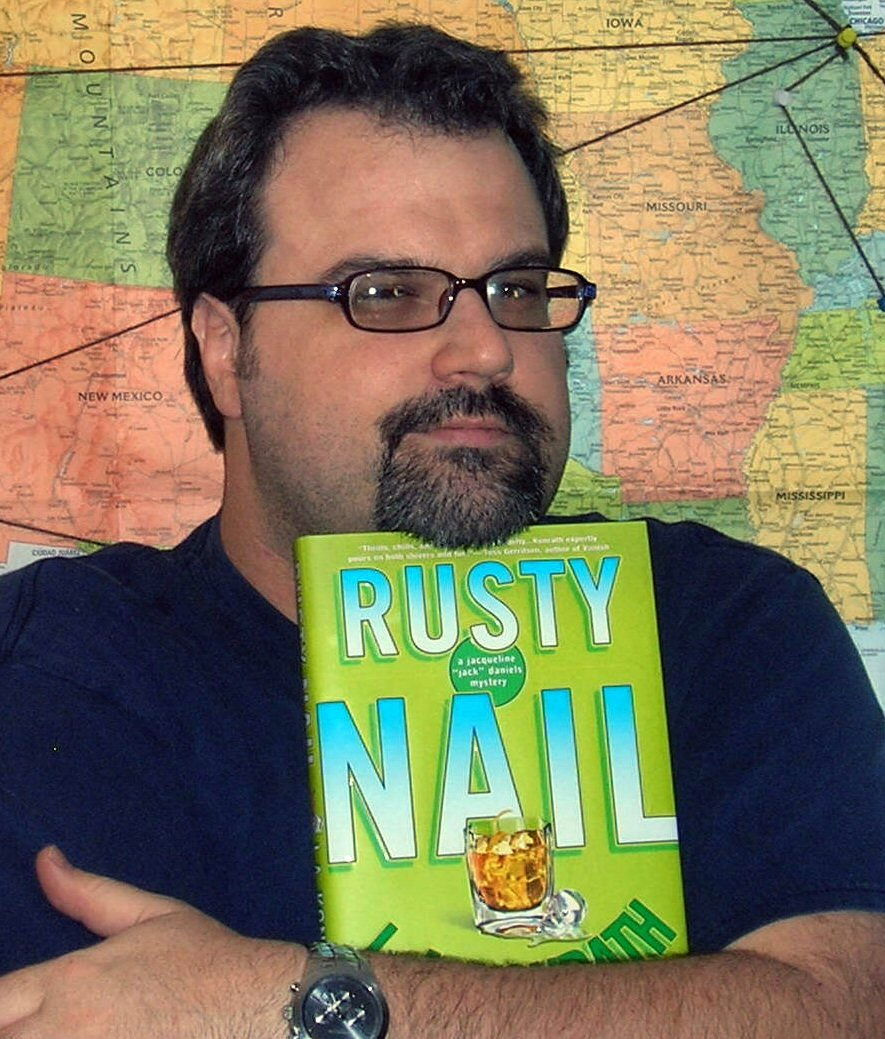
- Born: Joseph Andrew Konrath; March 29, 1970 (age 56); Skokie, Illinois, U.S.
- Education: Columbia College Chicago
- Occupation: Novelist
- Writing career
- Genres: Mystery, Thriller, Horror
- Website: jakonrath.com

Joseph Andrew Konrath (born March 29, 1970, in Skokie, Illinois) is an American fiction writer working in the mystery, thriller, and horror genres. He writes as J. A. Konrath and Jack Kilborn.

== Biography ==
Konrath graduated from Columbia College in Chicago in 1992 and spent the next 12 years garnering close to five hundred rejections for nine unpublished novels. His tenth book, Whiskey Sour, was picked up by Hyperion in 2003 and was the first in a series featuring Lt. Jacqueline "Jack" Daniels of the Chicago Police Department. He's since published dozens of short stories and articles, been translated into eight languages, and edited an anthology called These Guns for Hire for Bleak House Books. In 2010 the seventh book in the Jack Daniels series was picked up for publication by AmazonEncore.

He currently lives in Schaumburg, Illinois, a western suburb of Chicago. He teaches writing at the College of DuPage.

=== Awards ===
Konrath won the 2005 Derringer Award for Flash Fiction and the 2006 Bob Kellog Humanitarian Award. He was 2nd place for the 2005 Ellery Queen Reader's Choice Award and was nominated in 2004 for the Macavity Awards, Anthony Awards, and Gumshoe Awards.

== Writing ==
Konrath is a big advocate of self-publishing and for self-promotion, believing that writers must play a large part in marketing their own books. He's also known for having an outspoken view on the publishing industry, blogging about topics such as the 2012 accusations by some industry pundits that Amazon has endangered book sales.

== Bibliography ==
=== Novels ===
- Afraid (2008, 2019) - Under the pseudonym Jack Kilborn ISBN 9781706110798
- A Shot of Tequila (2010) - A Jack Daniels Thriller ISBN 9781453885765 Audiobook narrated by Luke Daniels
- Endurance (2010) - Under the pseudonym Jack Kilborn ISBN 9781453885680 Audiobook narrated by Christopher Lane
- Trapped (2010) - Under the pseudonym Jack Kilborn ISBN 9781453806029 Audiobook narrated by MacLeod Andrews

=== Jack Daniels series ===
Audiobooks in this series narrated by Bob Walkenhorst, Dani McIntyre, and Dillon Horinek

- Whiskey Sour (2004) ISBN 9781401399863
- Bloody Mary (2005) ISBN 9781482373332
- Rusty Nail (2006) ISBN 9781401384739
- Dirty Martini (2007) ISBN 9781401388157
- Fuzzy Navel (2008) ISBN 9781401395391
- Cherry Bomb (2009) ISBN 9781482374575
- Dead on my Feet ISBN 9781521192115
- Serial Killers Uncut with Blake Crouch (2011)ISBN 9781463501570
- Shaken (2010) ISBN 9781935597216
- Stirred (with Blake Crouch (2012)) ISBN 9798372151826
- Dying Breath (2014) ISBN 9781980503637
- Everybody Dies ISBN 9781980932468
- Rum Runner (2016) ISBN 9781533179333
- Last Call (2016) ISBN 9781534849181
- White Russian (2017) ISBN 9781973403814
- Shot Girl (2019) ISBN 9781099020421
- Chaser (2019) ISBN 9781679240843
- Old Fashioned (2020) ISBN 9798785466944
- Lady 52 (with Jude Hardin (2021)) ISBN 9798538772483
- Bite Force (2022) ISBN 9798843641924
- Witch Brew (2023) ISBN 9798863380797
- Jack Rose (2023) ISBN 9798375242316
- Pink Lady (2024) ISBN 9798303914261
- Bourbon Hammer (2025) ISBN 9798267118309

=== Tie-in stories ===
- "On the Rocks" (Featuring Jack Daniels, first published in Ellery Queen's Mystery Magazine (EQMM))
- "With a Twist" (Featuring Jack Daniels, EQMM)
- "Body Shots" (Featuring Jack Daniels, Amazon Shorts)
- "Whelp Wanted" (Featuring Harry McGlade, Futures Mysterious Anthology Magazine)
- "Taken to the Cleaners" (Featuring Harry McGlade, The Strand Magazine)
- "Street Music" (Featuring Phineas Troutt, EQMM)
- "Epitaph" (Featuring Phineas Troutt, Thriller edited by James Patterson)
- "Suffer" (Featuring Phineas Troutt, EQMM)
- "Bereaved" (Featuring Phineas Troutt, These Guns for Hire, edited by J. A. Konrath)
- "Potshot" (Featuring Herb Benedict, Amazon Shorts)
- "The One That Got Away" (Featuring The Gingerbread Man, Amazon Shorts)
- "The Necro File" (Featuring Harry McGlade, first published in Like a Chinese Tattoo)
- "Last Request" (Featuring Phineas Troutt)
- "Overproof" (Featuring Jack Daniels, first published in Chicago Blues edited by Libby Fischer Hellmann)
- "School Daze" (Phineas Troutt)

The above are all collected in the book Jack Daniels Stories.

- Suckers (Featuring Harry McGlade) novella co-written by Jeff Strand
- "Truck Stop"
- "Floaters"
- "Planter's Punch"
- "Burners"
- "Banana Hammock"
- "Babe on Board"

=== Other short stories ===
- "The Agreement" (Alfred Hitchcock's Mystery Magazine)
- "Symbios" (Apex Digest)
- "Forgiveness" (Cemetery Dance)
- "Light Drizzle" (Crimespree Magazine)
- "The Shed" (Surreal Magazine)
- "Finicky Eater" (Horror Garage Magazine)
- "The Screaming" (The Many Faces of Van Helsing, edited by Jeanne Cavelos)
- "Don’t Press That Button!" (James Bond in the 21st Century, edited by Glenn Yeffeth)
- "The Bag" (Cold Flesh, edited by Paul Fry)
- "The Big Guys, He Bites, A Matter of Taste" (Small Bites, edited by Garrett Peck and Keith Gouveia)
- "Appalachian Lullabye" (Requiem for the Radioactive Monkey, edited by John Weagley)
- "Lying Eyes" (Twisted Tongue Magazine)
- "Redux" (Spooks, edited by Tina L. Jens & John Everson)
- "The Conversation" (Hard Luck Stories)
- "A Fistful of Cozy" (Shots)
- "Mr. Pull Ups" (Tales from the Red Lion, edited by Tina L. Jens and John Weagley)
- "Punishment" (Like a Chinese Tattoo, edited by Bill Breedlove)
- "The Confession" (Like a Chinese Tattoo, edited by Bill Breedlove)
- "Them's Good Eats" (Gratia Placenti, edited by Jason Sizemore & Gill Ainsworth)
- "Lying Eyes" (Twisted Tongue #2)
- "The Sound of Blunder" co-written with F. Paul Wilson (Blood Lite, edited by Kevin J. Anderson)
- "S.A." (Wolfsbane & Mistletoe, edited by Charlaine Harris & Toni L.P. Kelner)

=== Other self-published fiction ===
- Origin - A thriller about Satan being studied in a secret government compound (Kindle edition April 2009; paperback November 2010; 2018 edition ISBN 9780786042753).
- The List - A thriller about a cop who discovers he, and several others, are clones of famous historical figures (Kindle edition April 2009; paperback July 2010); Kensington 2018 edition ISBN 9780786042746
- Disturb - A thriller about a new legal insomnia drug with deadly side effects (Kindle edition April 2009; paperback November 2010); 2019 edition ISBN 9781709483097
- 65 Proof - A collection of short stories (Kindle edition April 2009; paperback March 2011).
- Epitaph - A thriller originally published in the Thriller (anthology) edited by James Patterson and published by Harlequin Enterprises in 2017; ISBN 9781488094392

=== Self-published non-fiction ===
- The Newbie's Guide to Publishing (Everything a Writer Needs to Know) – Kindle edition April 2010.
- Be the Monkey - Ebooks and Self-Publishing: A Dialog Between Authors Barry Eisler and Joe Konrath – Co-written with Barry Eisler (Kindle edition June 2011).
