= Robert Whitlow =

American writer

- Education: University of Georgia School of Law (JD)
- Occupations: Novelist, Attorney
- Writing career
- Genres: Legal thriller Christian fiction
- Notable works: The List; The Trial; Jimmy
- Website: robertwhitlow.com

Robert Whitlow is an American film-maker and a best-selling author of fifteen legal thrillers. He is also a contributor to a short story The Rescuers, a story included in the book What The Wind Picked Up by The ChiLibris Ring. In 2001, he won the Christy Award for Contemporary Fiction, for his novel The Trial.

His debut novel was made into a movie of the same title, The List, starring Malcolm McDowell.

In 2010, Whitlow's second film, The Trial, based upon Whitlow's Christy Award Winning book of the same name, was directed by Gary Wheeler. The screenplay for the movie was written by Mark Freiburger and Wheeler. The movie starred Matthew Modine, Nikki Deloach, Robert Forster, Clare Carey and Bob Gunton

A third movie, Jimmy was released in 2013 starring Ian Colletti, Ted Levine, Kelly Carlson, Patrick Fabian and Stelio Savante.

Robert Whitlow received his Juris Doctor degree from the University of Georgia School of Law, is a practicing attorney, and lives in North Carolina.

== Biography ==
=== Writing career ===
Before Robert Whitlow wrote his first novel, best-selling The List, he had no ambition whatsoever to write. He woke one morning thinking about how people don't realise how much the past influences the present. While driving to his law office that morning, an idea for a novel regarding this subject came to mind. That night, he mentioned it to his wife, Kathy, who said "You should write that!" So he did.

After The List was published, he wrote The Trial, which won a Christy Award in 2001. He has continued to write ever since then.

Christian novelist William Sirls has been influenced by the work of Robert Whitlow.

== Bibliography ==
=== Novels ===
==== Stand Alone Novels ====
- The List (2000)
- The Trial (2001)
- The Sacrifice (2002)
- Jimmy (2006)
- Mountain Top (2007)
- Water's Edge (novel) (2011)
- The Choice (novel) (2012)
- The Living Room (novel) (2013)
- The Confession (novel) (2014)
- A House Divided (novel) (2015)
- The Witnesses (novel) (2016)
- A Time to Stand (novel) (2017)
- Relative Justice (novel) (2022)

==== Alexia Lindale Series ====
- Life Support (2003)
- Life Everlasting (2004)

==== Tides of Truth Series ====
- Deeper Water (novel) (2008)
- Higher Hope (novel) (2009)
- Greater Love (novel) (2010)

==== A Chosen People Series ====
- Chosen People (novel) (2018)
- Promised Land (novel) (2020)

=== Short stories ===
- The Rescuers (in What The Wind Picked Up)

=== Films ===
- The List (2007)
- The Trial (2010)
- Jimmy (2013)
- Mountain Top (2017)
