= Jimmy (2013 film) =

- Based on: Jimmy by Robert Whitlow
- Screenplay by: Robert Whitlow; Gary Wheeler; Mark Freiburger
- Directed by: Mark Freiburger
- Starring: Ian Colletti; Ted Levine; Kelly Carlson; Patrick Fabian; Stelio Savante
- Theme music composer: Rob Pottorf
- Country of origin: United States
- Original language: English

Production
- Producer: Gary Wheeler
- Cinematography: Rob C. Givens
- Editor: Jonathan Olive
- Running time: 95 minutes
- Production companies: Level Path Productions; Dog Days Entertainment; Whitlow Films

Original release
- Network: Up TV
- Release: June 2, 2013

Jimmy is a 2013 drama film directed by Mark Freiburger and based on the novel by Robert Whitlow, who co-wrote the adaptation with Freiburger and producer Gary Wheeler.

== Plot ==
The central character of the film is Jimmy Mitchell, a fourteen-year-old boy with mild intellectual disability (described in the film as having an IQ between 59 and 70). In the quaint town of Pinery Grove, Georgia, he lives under the loving care of his family, striving to overcome the day-to-day struggles that surface.

While deprived of mental normality, he is supernaturally gifted with a unique capability to see beyond what most see. A supernatural element coincides with his unique spiritual gift, as angelic beings he calls "Watchers", are seen throughout his everyday experiences.

His profound sense of observation leads him into trouble when stumbling onto the wrong place at the wrong time (which proves an arbitrary habit for Jimmy), as he must testify in a pivotal trial what he bore witness to.

== Cast ==
- Ian Colletti as Jimmy Mitchell
- Ted Levine as James Lee Mitchell
- Kelly Carlson as Ellen Mitchell
- Patrick Fabian as Lee Mitchell
- Bob Gunton as Sheriff Brinson
- Burgess Jenkins as Jake Garner
- Jackson Pace as Max Cochran
- Gregory Alan Williams as Coach Sellers
- R. Keith Harris as Brother Fitzgerald
- Stelio Savante as Mr. Laney

== Production ==
Producer Gary Wheeler had previously directed two adaptations of author Robert Whitlow's novels, The List (2007) and The Trial (2010), and had chosen to only co-write and produce the film adaptation of Jimmy, a Whitlow novel published in 2005. He gave a copy of the novel to Mark Freiburger, who had co-written the previous adaptations, with the suggestion of his directing the film adaptation. After Whitlow's approval, Freiburger signed on to direct the film, enthusiastic about working with an actor on developing the portrayal of a mentally disabled character and "making it believable for an audience".

== Release and reception ==
The film premiered worldwide on the Up TV network on June 2, 2013, and was released to DVD on June 4 in the US. In October 2013, it had a limited theatrical release in twenty cities, four months after the DVD release.

The film has also played at numerous events and film festivals.
