= Joseph Greco =

American film director

Joseph Greco (born 1972) is a writer, director and producer living in Los Angeles. He wrote & directed the feature film Canvas.

Greco was interested in magic, entering the Society of American Magicians aged 14, but shifted his interest to film shortly before attending university. He graduated from Florida State University's School of Motion Picture, Television and Recording Arts in 1994. He began making short films in Hollywood, Florida in the mid-90s, before moving to Hollywood in 1995. He has worked with director James Cameron and has received awards for his short films, The Ghost of Drury Lane and Lena's Spaghetti, which premiered in the Telluride Film Festival's Filmmakers of Tomorrow Program. Greco is a member of the Directors Guild of America.

Greco has directed many plays, short films, music videos & PSAs, working with actors such as Harrison Ford, Matthew Modine, and Cloris Leachman. He directed the music video "Hope Is a Thing" for singer/songwriter Lisbeth Scott, working alongside two-time Academy Award-winning cinematographer Haskell Wexler. Joseph Greco directed the Disney internet commercial "Dance Star Mickey" starring Quest Crew. Greco is the producer & director of the 2011 Emmy winning documentary series "Profiles of Hope" and the producer of Joe Pantoliano's documentary "No Kidding, Me Too," both of which were released on PBS.

Canvas is Greco's first feature film, and was inspired by his own experience of living with his mother, who suffered from schizophrenia. He said that "It's like a love letter to my parents. I felt this was my way of sublimating what I had gone through. Every filmmaker has something they are passionate about, and for me, it's mental illness." It was filmed in 2006, and stars Academy Award winner Marcia Gay Harden, Emmy Award winner Joe Pantoliano and Devon Gearhart. Canvas premiered at the Hampton's International Film Festival, won the Alice in the City Prize (Best Feature Film) at the 2007 Rome Film Festival, and several other awards. Canvas well received by film critics such as Roger Ebert and Peter Travers of Rolling Stone. Greco was recognized by MovieMaker Magazine in their screenwriter spotlight for Canvas, and has been invited to speak about Canvas and the subject of mental health at the United Nations, Tufts University and Yale University.
