= Dog Days of Summer (film) =

- Directed by: Mark Freiburger
- Written by: Travis Beacham, Christopher J. Waild, Mark Freiburger
- Produced by: Mark Freiburger, Jason Behrman, Rick Eldridge, Michael E. Wekall
- Starring: Richard Herd; Devon Gearhart; Colin Ford; R. Keith Harris with Will Patton and Megan Blake
- Narrated by: Colin Key
- Cinematography: Rob C. Givens
- Edited by: Jonathan Olive
- Music by: Rob Pottorf
- Distributed by: Level Path Productions, Mountain Top Releasing
- Release dates: September 2007 (Big Bear Lake International Film Festival); February 22, 2008 (United States)
- Running time: 90 minutes
- Country: United States
- Language: English

Dog Days of Summer is a 2007 American independent feature film directed by Mark Freiburger and shot on location in Edenton, North Carolina. It is based on an original screenplay by screenwriters Travis Beacham and Christopher J. Waild.

The film stars Will Patton, Richard Herd, Devon Gearhart, and Colin Ford.

== Plot ==
Dog Days of Summer opens with adult Philip Walden paying a visit to the unnamed town where he grew up. In a voiceover, he expresses his disgust over the ramshackle, broken down state of things, and, with trepidation, recalls "the summer I unwillingly grew up."

That summer kicked off with the arrival of Eli (Will Patton), as witnessed by preteen Philip (Devon Gearhart) and best friend Jackson (Colin Ford). The two boys stare in awe as Eli tumbles out of his ancient-looking car and invite the townsfolk over to look at his amazing model circus. It is not long before Eli convinces the mayor to pay him to create a scale model of the town for the upcoming bisesquicentennial. Philip and Jackson, both dealing with troubles at home, glom onto Eli, using his old camera to take pictures of the town for Eli to use as inspiration.

Despite its picture-perfect surface, Philip's town is anything but idyllic. His father is a minister, but not exactly the heroic kind—more the philandering kind. Jackson's blind father drinks his life away, mourning the loss of Jackson's mother to a car crash. Both boys are lost in a sea of adult emotions, with neither the maturity nor the resources to cope. As the boys take pictures for Eli, they watch the lives of those they love unraveling around them, and struggle to hang onto their dream of an uncomplicated life where the sun is always high and the river is filled with fish...

== Cast ==
- Will Patton as Eli Cottonmouth
- Richard Herd as Frank Cooper
- Devon Gearhart as Philip Walden
- Colin Ford as Jackson Patch
- Megan Blake as May Walden
- Gregory Alan Williams as Sheriff Lem Baker
- Wayne Crawford as Quincy Patch
- R. Keith Harris as Pastor Salem
- Colin Key as Older Phil Walden
- Jessica Webb as Camille
- Paul Silver as Brock Walden
- Mark Joy as Chuck Walden
- Richard Fullerton as The General
- Joe Inscoe as Doc Rockwell
- Patricia Herd as Marilyn Rockwell
- Bonnie Johnson as Martha
- Logan Fahey as Chip Robinson

== Release ==
The film was released on April 18, 2008 and opened as the 22nd highest per screen average in the nation out of the 122 recorded films in theatrical release.

== Home media ==
The North American DVD release date was April 21, 2009
