= R. Keith Harris =

American actor

R. Keith Harris is an American actor. He is known for playing Dr. Harlan Carson in The Walking Dead.

== Personal life ==
Harris was raised in Reidsville, North Carolina. He attended the University of North Carolina at Greensboro. He resides in Greensboro, North Carolina. He is married and is the father of two children.

== Filmography ==
=== Film ===
Year	Title	Role	Notes
1997	Last Lives	Police Officer	
1997	Digging to China	Flirting Man	
1999	Age to Age	Rob DeVille	
1999	Legend of Two-Path	English Officer	
2001	Morning	Deputy	
2003	E.V.E	Isaac	Short film
2003	Roadside Convenience	James	Short film
2003	Big Fish	Ed's Father	
2004	I Gotta Cat	Little Brother	Short film
2004	Shank's Mare	Cadger	
2004	Chicks 101	Louie King	
2004	Pirate Kids: Blackbeard's Lost Treasure	John Armstrong Jr. & Sr.	
2005	Junebug	Bud	
2005	Harvest	Tony Bloodsworth	Short film
2005	The Broken Sword	Bill Pierce	Short film
2005	Booth	John Wilkes Booth	Short film
2006	Walker Payne	State Trooper	
2006	Pirate Kids II: The Search for the Silver Skull	John Armstrong Jr. & Sr.	
2006	Kilroy Was Here	Pilot	Short film
2006	Gigi: God's Little Princess	Gigi's Dad	
2007	The List	Bart Maxwell	
2007	Fall Down Dead	Detective Lawrence Kellog	
2007	Dog Days of Summer	Pastor Salem/Marty	
2008	April Fool's Day	Seton Motley	
2008	Lost Stallions: The Journey Home	Mack	
2008	A Brush with Murder	Det. Harry Morgan	Short film
2008	Train Wreck	Owen	
2009	In/Significant Others	Detective Thicke	
2009	Wesley	Charles Wesley	
2010	The 5th Quarter	Dr. Phillips	
2010	The Trial	Lt. Monroe	
2011	Red Dirt Rising	Mr. Nance	
2012	Hatchet County	Capt. Robert Schaner	
2013	Jimmy	Brother Fitzgerald	
2013	Healthy Heroes: Brain Fries	Various voices	Short film
2014	Dark Awakening	Mr. Korinthos	
2014	Hero	Winston Heller	
2015	A Walk in the Woods	Sam Bryson	
2015	All They Knew	Michael	Short film
2015	Adrenaline	Marcus	
2016	An Innocent Kiss	Billy Barnes	
2016	Karma's Shadow	John JW Walker	Short film
2017	Sons of Our Fathers	William Lamb	
2017	Nobodies	William	Short film
2017	County Line	Deputy Sloan	
2018	Shifting Gears	Tom Williamson	
2019	Fever Dreams Movie	Ralph Oates	
2019	Greener	Jay Cassano	
2019	The Scout	Joe Cronin	
2019	Anybody Home?	Thomas	Short film
2020	Breaking Bread	Unknown	
2021	This Not Too Distant Tomorrow	The Priest	Short film
2025	Slanted	Willie Singer	

=== Television ===
Year	Title	Role	Notes
1993	Matlock	Kevin Richman	1 episode
1993	Lovejoy	Computer Student (uncredited)	1 episode
1997	Love's Deadly Triangle: The Texas Cadet Murder	Ben	TV movie
1997	Steel Chariots	Jerry	TV movie
1998	From the Earth to the Moon	Charlie	Miniseries (1 episode)
1999	Beverly Hills, 90210	Pete Hawkins	1 episode
2003	Dawson's Creek	Rehab Counselor	1 episode
2004	One Tree Hill	Surgeon/Doctor	2 episodes
2005	Surface	Dr. Meyers	1 episode
2007	Army Wives	Chaplain	1 episode
2009	Crossroads Charlotte	Homeless Vet	TV Movie
2011	Revenge	Doug Reid	1 episode
2014	Nashville	Live-Stream Director	1 episode
2014	Devious Maids	Director	1 episode
2013-2014	Under the Dome	Peter Shumway	5 episodes
2015	Halt and Catch Fire	Dr. Semel	3 episodes
2016	The Inspectors	Dr. Canworth	1 episode
2016	Outcast	Lowell Grippo	1 episode
2016	Rectify	Rick	1 episode
2017	Sleepy Hollow	Landlord	2 episodes
2017	Shots Fired	Penn Moder	2 episodes
2017	Lore	Dr. James Watts	1 episode
2016-2018	The Walking Dead	Dr. Harlan Carson	7 episodes
2018	The Resident	Delivery Man	2 episodes
2019	Step Up	Nate Duncan	2 episodes
2019	Bluff City Law	Judge Jacobs	1 episode
2020	The Right Stuff	Jim Rathman	1 episode
2021	Dopesick	Martin Willis	Miniseries (5 episodes)
2022	See/Saw	Bruce	1 episode
