= Wesley (film) =

- Promotional poster
- Directed by: John Jackman
- Written by: John Jackman; Carolyn Haywood
- Produced by: Lovinder Gill; Geoff Thompson
- Starring: Burgess Jenkins; June Lockhart; Kevin McCarthy; R. Keith Harris
- Cinematography: Arledge Armenaki
- Music by: Bruce Kiesling
- Distributed by: Vision Video
- Release dates: November 14, 2009 (premiere); July 15, 2010 (DVD US)
- Running time: 117 minutes
- Language: English

Wesley, also titled Wesley: A Heart Transformed Can Change The World, is a 2009 biopic about John Wesley and Charles Wesley, the founders of the Methodist movement. The movie is based largely on the Wesley brothers' own journals, including John's private journal which was kept in a shorthand-like code that was not translated until the 1980s by Richard Heitzenrater at the Duke Divinity School.

The film covers the critical period of John Wesley's life as he struggles with his own doubts and insecurities, leading up to his life-changing Aldersgate experience and the early development of the Methodist movement.

Wesley was filmed in a number of authentic 18th century locations in and around Winston-Salem, North Carolina, including St. Paul's Episcopal Church.

Unusual for a lower-budget independent film, it features an original orchestral score recorded by a full orchestra. The score, composed by Bruce Kiesling, uses snippets of Wesley hymns and portions composed to echo authentic 18th-century style. Kiesling, who has composed scores for a number of other films, is currently conductor of the Tulare County Orchestra in California.

Funded in part by the Christian History Institute and Comenius Foundation, the movie was directed by John Jackman.

== Cast ==
- Burgess Jenkins - John Wesley
- R. Keith Harris - Charles Wesley
- June Lockhart - Susanna Wesley
- Kevin McCarthy - Bishop Rider
- Michael Huie - Samuel Wesley
- Rusty Martin - Young John Wesley
- Carrie Anne Hunt - Sophy Hopkey
- Leanne Bernard - Grace Murray
- Lloyd Arneach - Tomochichi
- Hilary Russo - Mary Musgrove
- Bill Oberst Jr. - Peter Boehler
- Erik Nelson - Mr. Delamotte
- Roger Willie - Cusseta
- James France - Wealthy Mine Owner
- Kai Elijah Hamilton - Mob Man (Cameo)

== Reception ==
Jeff Paton from The Arminian magazine called it "Impressive for a religious film;" but criticized the poor effects and overplayed ideas of "a Wesleyan Quadrilateral, which was not a large part of Wesley's emphasis or ministry".

== Festivals and awards ==
Wesley has been featured in numerous international film festivals, including:

- 2010 Bayou City Inspirational Film Festival
- 2010 Phoenix International Christian Film Festival
- 2010 CEVMA Film Festival, Milan, Italy
- 2010 International Christian Film Festival, Port Talbot, Wales
- 2010 Heart of England Film Festival, Worcester, UK
- 2010 Gideon Film Festival

The film won several awards, including:

- 2010 Platinum FEXY Award (motion graphics/CGI special FX) – TechniCine, Foundery Pictures, Wesley
- 2010 Platinum EMPixx Award, CGI/Special Effects – TechniCine, Foundery Pictures
- 2010 Silver Telly Award (Religion & Spirituality)
- 2010 Bronze Telly Award (History & Biography)
- 2010 Bronze Telly Award (Lighting)
- 2010 Bronze Telly Award (CGI/Special Effects)
- 2010 Silver Crown, "Best Drama over $250,000," 2010 International Christian Visual Media Association Crown Awards
- 2010 Bronze Crown for "Best Picture," 2010 International Christian Visual Media Association Crown Awards
- 2010 First Place Feature Film Competition, Bayou City Inspirational Film Festival
