= Comenius Foundation (US) =

U.S.-based nonprofit organization

Comenius Foundation is a U.S.-based 501(c)(3) nonprofit organization that uses media to promote education and faith. Named after pioneering educator and Moravian Bishop John Amos Comenius, the Foundation seeks to use modern media to promote the ideas of Comenius. Comenius Foundation has helped fund development of a number of media projects including Zinzendorf, a four-part documentary miniseries that was aired on the Hallmark Channel; a German version of the program, Der Graf Ohne Grenzen (The Count Without Borders), distributed by Haenssler Verlag; the 2009 feature film Wesley starring Burgess Jenkins, June Lockhart, and Kevin McCarthy; and several informational websites. The Foundation also provides internship opportunities for young student filmmakers.
