= Malavé =

Malavé or Malave is a surname. Notable people with the surname include:

- Alejandro González Malavé (1957–1986), Puerto Rican undercover agent
- Ángel L. Malavé Zayas, Puerto Rican politician
- Edwin Malave (born 1950), American boxer and actor
- Elías Malavé (born 1989), Venezuelan archer
- Jesús Malavé (born 1965), Venezuelan sprinter
- José Malavé (born 1971), Venezuelan baseball player
- Martin Malave Dilan (born 1950), American politician
- Omar Malavé (1963–2021), Venezuelan baseball player, coach and manager
