= Marry Me (miniseries) =

- Promotional poster
- Genre: Romantic comedy
- Written by: Barbara Hall
- Directed by: James Hayman
- Starring: Lucy Liu; Steven Pasquale; Bobby Cannavale; Enrique Murciano; Danielle Nicolet; Vanessa Marano; David Andrews; Elizabeth Bogush; Burgess Jenkins; Annie Potts; Kenny Alfonso; Javier Carrasquillo; Susan Mansur; Elizabeth Omilami
- Theme music composer: Jonathan Grossman
- Country of origin: United States
- Original language: English
- No. of episodes: 2

Production
- Executive producers: Susanne Daniels; Barbara Hall; James Hayman
- Producers: Robert J. Wilson; Alex Shevchenko; Jeff Kay
- Cinematography: Neil Roach
- Editors: David Beatty; Michael N. Krue
- Running time: 169 minutes
- Production company: Woodridge Productions

Original release
- Network: Lifetime
- Release: December 12 – December 13, 2010

Marry Me is an American romantic comedy television miniseries directed by James Hayman and written by Barbara Hall, starring Lucy Liu. It aired on Lifetime on December 12 and 13, 2010.

== Plot ==
Rae Ann Carter is an artist turned social worker who is looking for the right man to marry. Just as she thinks she has one in Adam, both she and Adam break up. Unsure, she tries again with Luke, who wants to be the right one: then another man, Harry, takes an interest in her followed by Adam's return. With three men buzzing around her like bees, Rae Ann has a decision to make.

== Cast ==
- Lucy Liu as Rae Ann Carter
- Steven Pasquale as Luke Maynard
- Bobby Cannavale as Adam
- Enrique Murciano as Harry
- Danielle Nicolet as Candace
- Vanessa Marano as Imogen Hicks
- David Andrews as Swan Carter
- Elizabeth Bogush as Trudy Rumson
- Burgess Jenkins as Jeff Rumson
- Annie Potts as Vivienne Carter
- Kenny Alfonso as Jack
- Javier Carrasquillo as Ward
- Susan Mansur as Judge Barbour
- Elizabeth Omilami as Kim
