= Travis Beacham =

American screenwriter

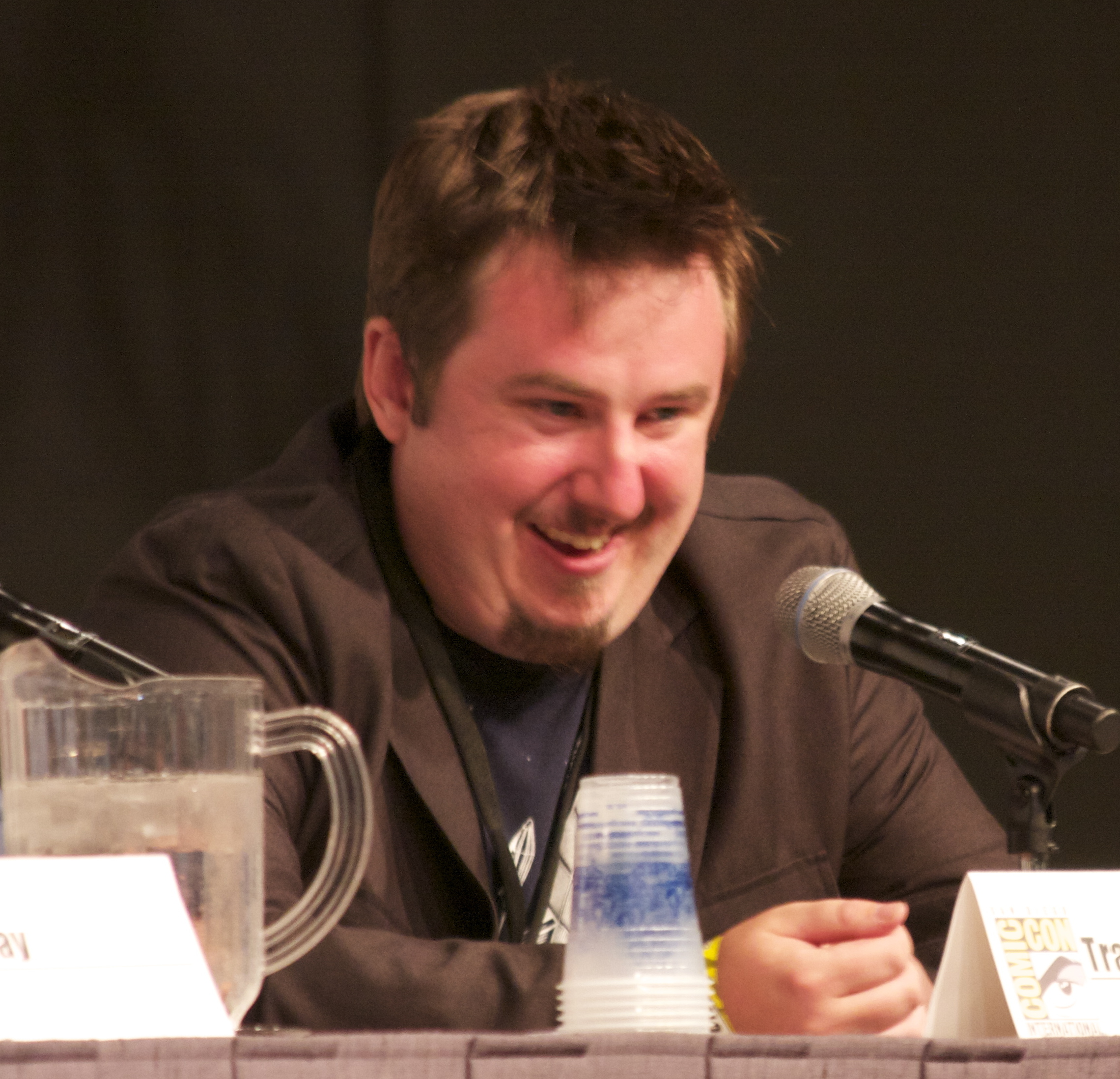
- Beacham at the 2011 Comic-Con International
- Born: 1980 (age 45–46); Cleveland, Tennessee, United States
- Occupation: Screenwriter
- Years active: 2007-present

Travis Beacham (born 1980) is an American screenwriter, best known for writing and co-writing the films Dog Days of Summer (2007), Pacific Rim (2013), Clash of the Titans (2010), and proposing the concept for the Amazon Prime fantasy TV series Carnival Row (2019–2023).

== Career ==
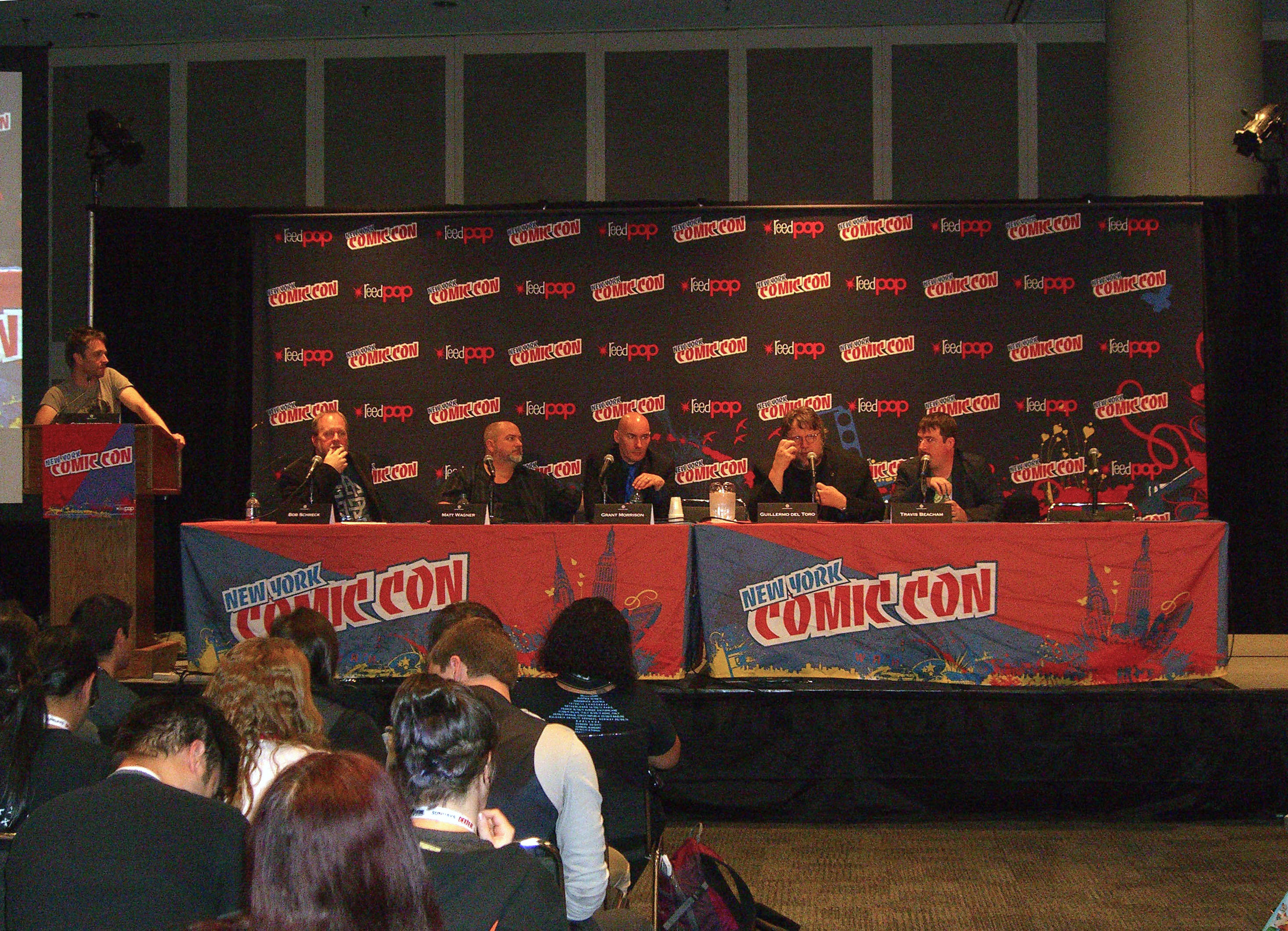
Beacham, at right, at a Legendary Comics panel at the 2012 New York Comic Con. Beside him, right to left, are Guillermo del Toro, Grant Morrison, Matt Wagner, Bob Schreck and Chris Hardwick.

Just prior to graduating from the University of North Carolina School of the Arts in 2005 after studying screenwriting, Beacham contributed to the independent feature Dog Days of Summer directed by fellow alum Mark Freiburger.

Beacham's first spec script A Killing on Carnival Row was picked up by New Line Cinema in 2005. Characterized as "a dark neo-noir fantasy thriller," the project was in development for years with directors Guillermo del Toro and Neil Jordan. However, in May 2017 it was announced that Amazon Studios had ordered an eight-episode television series based on the script, Carnival Row.

In May 2006, Beacham was hired to write an early draft of the Warner Bros. remake of the 1981 mythology epic Clash of the Titans.

His second spec script, an "otherworldly fantasy" titled The Tanglewood, was picked up by Carnival Row producers Arnold Kopelson and Anne Kopelson in 2007.

In 2009, Beacham was reported to be working on the screenplay for the Disney remake of The Black Hole. Plot details of Beacham's script have been kept under wraps, but the film was said to be more grounded in science.

In 2010, Beacham's treatment for the science fiction film Pacific Rim was acquired by Legendary Pictures. The film, directed by Guillermo del Toro, features giant robots defending the world from an onslaught of giant monsters. Prior to the film's release in 2013, Beacham authored a graphic novel prequel titled Pacific Rim: Tales From Year Zero, with art by Sean Chen, Yvel Guichet, Pericles Junior and Alex Ross.

Cable network AMC announced in April 2013 a science fiction crime drama called Ballistic City. Developed as a potential companion for The Walking Dead, the new series was to depict "a former cop thrust into the criminal underworld of a city housed in a generational spaceship." Beacham was set to write the script and executive produce alongside director Joseph Kosinski. Beacham was also a creative voice behind the TV series Hieroglyph which got cancelled before the first episode aired.

In 2016 he made his directorial debut with the science fiction short The Curiosity, starring Caroline Ford, Danial Wolfe, and Andrew Novell. The next year, it was announced that he would write an episode of the Channel 4/Amazon Video series Philip K. Dick's Electric Dreams ("Autofac").
