= Carrasquillo =

Carrasquillo is a Hispanic surname. Notable people with the surname include:

- Javier Carrasquillo (born 1964), Puerto Rican politician
