= Shorts (2009 film) =

Shorts: The Adventures of the Wishing Rock
- Theatrical release poster
- Directed by: Robert Rodriguez
- Written by: Robert Rodriguez
- Produced by: Robert Rodriguez; Elizabeth Avellán
- Starring: Jon Cryer; William H. Macy; Leslie Mann; James Spader; Jimmy Bennett; Kat Dennings
- Cinematography: Robert Rodriguez
- Edited by: Ethan Maniquis; Robert Rodriguez
- Music by: George Oldziey; Robert Rodriguez; Carl Thiel
- Production companies: Imagenation Abu Dhabi; Media Rights Capital; Troublemaker Studios
- Distributed by: Warner Bros. Pictures
- Release dates: August 15, 2009 (Grauman's Chinese Theatre); August 21, 2009; (United States)
- Running time: 89 minutes
- Countries: United States; United Arab Emirates
- Language: English
- Budget: $20 million
- Box office: $29 million

Shorts (also known as Shorts: The Adventures of the Wishing Rock and released internationally as The Wishing Rock) is a 2009 fantasy comedy film written and directed by Robert Rodriguez and starring Jon Cryer, William H. Macy, Leslie Mann, James Spader, Jimmy Bennett, Kat Dennings, and introducing Jolie Vanier in her film debut, with Jake Short, Devon Gearhart, Trevor Gagnon, Leo Howard, and Rebel Rodriguez in supporting roles. It tells the story of a rainbow wishing rock that ends up in the possession of different people living in a company town where the wishes have various results for those who make the wishes in a "series of shorts".

Shorts: The Adventures of the Wishing Rock made its world premiere screening on August 15, 2009, at the Grauman's Chinese Theatre in Hollywood, California. Shortly after that, the movie was theatrically released in the United States on August 21, 2009, by Warner Bros. Pictures. The film grossed $29 million on a $20 million budget.

It received mixed reviews from critics and received a Young Artist Award nomination for Best Performance in a Feature Film. Shorts: The Adventures of the Wishing Rock was released on DVD and Blu-ray on November 24, 2009, by Warner Home Video.

== Plot ==
=== Episode Zero - The Blinkers ===
In this prelude, a boy and a girl play a game of "Who Blinks First" where whoever blinks first has to do "you know what". Their staring contest goes through every event, including sleeping. However, due to their mother disrupting the game, they had to start over.

=== Intro ===
In a suburban company town outside Austin, Texas called Black Falls Community, every adult works for Black Box Unlimited Worldwide Industries Incorporated Black Inc. Residents and children alike use the company’s product called the Black Box, a universal device invented by CEO Carbon Black. It can transform into multiple devices.

One day, a mysterious rainbow-colored rock that grants wishes appeared. 11-year-old Toby "Toe" Thompson lives in Black Falls Community with his parents, Bill and Jane and older sister Stacey. Bill and Jane work for Black Inc. They are assigned by Carbon Black to compete to create a new marketing strategy.

Due to Toby being unable to remember the order of events correctly, some of them will be considered "episodes" and will be randomized.

=== Episode Two - Toe Thompson in Alien8ed ===
Mr. Black's children Helvetica and Cole bully Toby on the way to school with their gang. He speculates that she bullies him because she has feelings for him, infuriating her, and gets dumped in a trash can. Later that day after school, Cole and his gang start throwing rocks at Toby.

One of the rocks they throw is the wishing rock, which Toby uses to wish for friends who are interesting and unique, as he is, which come in the form of tiny aliens and their UFO. Toby lets the aliens help him by cleaning up his room and removing his braces so he can clean his teeth perfectly. Stacey briefly touched the rock while wishing her ex-boyfriend John would grow up.

The next morning, Toby takes the aliens to school. However, their presence does not only cause chaos in the classroom during science lab, but causes Toby to fight with Helvetica, and then fall from the school's roof, resulting in both of them having casts put on both their arms. Toby then gets befriended by Loogie Short. The aliens leave by stating that Toby doesn't know he has friends yet.

=== Episode One - Lug, Loogie & Laser in The Wishing Rock ===
A rainbow-colored rock falls from the sky due to a massive thunderstorm and appears at the end of a rainbow where Loogie and his brothers, Laser and Lug find it. When they wonder what it could be, Loogie soon realizes that it is the wishing rock and then start using it to wish for various things, including a never-ending pocketful of chocolate bars, a fortress-like castle as well as a canyon full of crocodiles and cobras.

Soon, they accidentally drop the rock into the canyon and go in there to find it. Somehow they do find the rock and grab it but they are soon cornered by the snakes and crocodiles, where one of them uses it to wish that they can stand on two legs. Loogie wishes for a pterodactyl to get them out of the canyon and they land in the fortress.

Then they notice that the crocodiles can also walk up walls like spiders. Loogie wishes for telekinesis to get the crocodiles off the fortress before wishing him and his brothers back home. Loogie then wishes for one of them to be super-smart. However, the power is given to their infant sister through psychic abilities who, now having the ability to speak telepathically, convinces them to dispose of the rock, which they do by wishing for a giant catapult to throw it into the construction site where Cole finds it the next day to throw at Toby.

=== Episode Four - Nose Noseworthy in Big Bad Booger ===
Stacey finds the wishing rock on the Noseworthy's house front yard upon arriving to tutor Toby's old germaphobic friend "Nose" Noseworthy, a boy who picks his nose against the wishes of his father Dr. Noseworthy and accidentally flicks the booger into his father's radioactive work study. Toby and Loogie, now friends, arrive at Nose's house, break a window to get inside, and get confronted by Dr. Noseworthy who remembers the former for what happened last night. They, alongside Nose and Stacey see his booger mutate into a giant monster who eats the rock after Nose made a wish that his father's inventions would work right earlier. Toby eventually retrieves the rock with Nose's help.

After helping Dr. Noseworthy trap the booger monster outside enough for it to be shrunken, Toby and Loogie leave with the rock. With Nose now understanding why he can't pick his nose, Dr. Noseworthy starts to rethink this theory on germs.

=== Episode Three - The GrownUps in The Miscommunicators! ===
While preparing for the Black Box costume party with Bill, Jane finds the rock in Toby's room and takes it. She and Bill go to a Black Box costume party. Since they were having trouble with their relationship, she wished they were closer. They merge into a two-headed person, but Mr. Black thinks they're wearing a costume.

Realizing that his mom took the rock after hearing about it from Loogie, Toby rushes to the costume party to find it, but runs into the Black siblings who take it as Cole dumps him in the garbage. An infuriated Helvetica wishes that Cole would turn into a dung beetle and then lose the rock. Unaware of its power, Mr. Black finds the rock and accidentally wishes all the employees to go for each other's throats as Dr. Noseworthy is knocked down. Helvetica takes the rock, and wishes for three things: for her father to listen to her for a change which causes his ears to grow, to get her casts off both her arms, and a rocket-powered motorbike to escape. However, she hits and crashes into a curb, falls into a garbage can, and loses the rock again.

Toby retrieves the rock and wishes everyone back to normal. Helvetica attempts to get the rock back, but Toby throws it as far away as possible, and it lands at the Noseworthy's house.

=== Episode Five - Everyone in The End ===
While contemplating what to do with the rock, Toby wishes the casts on his arms were off. However, he and Loogie are confronted by Helvetica and Cole, who want the rock back, and then joined by Nose, Laser, and Lug, and both a chase with each other and a fight over it ensue. They use the rock by doing random wishes, like Nose transforming into a hawk upon wishing he could fly away, Laser wishing to have really long arms, and Helvetica wishing to be invisible. The rock then winds up in the hands of Mr. Black after a giant-size John arrives, causing Stacey to faint. Mr. Black wishes that he was the most powerful thing in the world and turned into a giant Black Box robot.

The Black siblings use the rock to respectively turn into a giant wasp and a giant dung beetle in an attempt to stop their father, causing the female Blinker to lose the game she and her brother were playing. Helvetica and Cole are then aided by Toby's aliens and Loogie's crocodile army, before the Short brothers' infant sister appears.

After using her powers to stop a crocodile from eating her, she tells them that the rock is starting to feel misused as shown by the fact that it is starting to undo all of their wishes. She also tells them that the rock could destroy the Earth because of their petty wishes they make. With help from Dr. Noseworthy's germs, everyone removes the rock, and all its effects are undone as it ends up at the end of another rainbow (though Baby Short still retains her intellect and telepathy). Bill and Jane decide to work on the marketing plan together and Mr. Black agrees. Stacey and John get back together, and Toby and Helvetica, no longer enemies, become friends as their braces reappear.

=== Finale ===
Toby narrates that the Noseworthys lose their germaphobia and dedicate their research to hygiene, his parents finally becoming closer together, with them becoming friends with Mr. Black as he states that he'll be part of the Black family in the future, while Helvetica states that she didn't agree to that. Mr. Black changes the Black Box into the more environmentally friendly Green Box. After all the children become friends and walk into daylight, Toby wishes that their story would become a Hollywood movie as Helvetica states that it will ever happen.

During the credits, a scene shows two of the small aliens herding the miniaturized booger monster into their UFO.

== Cast ==
=== Kids ===
- Jimmy Bennett as Toby "Toe" Thompson, an 11-year-old boy who was the second to find the wishing rock. He serves as the narrator of the film.
- Jolie Vanier as Helvetica "Hel" Black, Mr. Black's daughter and Toe's bully/love interest.
- Trevor Gagnon as Loogie Short, a boy who found the wishing rock. When he had the wishing rock, he wished for unreasonable stuff.
- Jake Short as "Nose" Noseworthy, a germophobe like his father and Toby's old friend.
- Rebel Rodriguez as Lug Short, Loogie's second brother who is the most video game-obsessed and easily angered of the three Short brothers.
- Leo Howard as Laser Short, Loogie's 12-year-old older brother. He seems to be the smartest of the three Short brothers.
- Devon Gearhart as Colbert "Cole" Black, Carbon's 13-year-old son, Hel's older brother, and captain of Black Falls Company School's football team. He cares deeply for Hel and is the leader of his own gang which Hel sometimes leads.
- Cambell Westmoreland as Blinker #1, a male kid who ends up in a staring contest.
- Zoe Webb as Blinker #2, a female kid who ends up in a staring contest with her sibling.
- Racer Rodriguez as Bully #1, a football player who is a member of Cole's gang.
- Rocket Rodriguez as Bully #2, another football player who is a member of Cole's gang.
- Bianca Rodriguez as the Baby Short, the infant sibling and sister of the Short brothers who is made super-smart by the wish of Loogie.
  - Elizabeth Avellán as the voice of the Baby

=== Adults ===
- Jon Cryer as Bill Thompson, Toby's father and Jane's husband who works at Black Box Worldwind Unlimited Industries.
- Leslie Mann as Jane Thompson, Toby's mother and Bill's wife who also works at Black Box Worldwide Unlimited Industries.
- James Spader as Carbon Black, Hel and Cole's father who is the founder and CEO of Black Box Worldwide Unlimited Industries.
- William H. Macy as Dr. Noseworthy, a germophobe scientist who works for Black Box Worldwide Unlimited Industries and does not like contamination.
- Kat Dennings as Stacey Thompson, Toby's 23-year-old older sister who gets flirted on by Loogie throughout the film.
- Angela Lanza as Toby's science teacher at Black Falls Company School
- Alejandro Rose-Garcia as John, Stacey's ex-boyfriend who is accidentally wished to grow up by Stacey which causes him to become 50 ft. tall.
- Chris Orf as a goofy host
- Tina Rodriguez as a female employee of Black Box Unlimited Worldwide Industries that Black fired for questioning the toaster configuration for the Black Box.
- Jackson Hurst as a male employee of Black Box Unlimited Worldwide Industries that Black also fired for questioning the toaster configuration for the Black Box.
- Jonathan Breck as a security guard of Black Box Unlimited Worldwide Industries who is accidentally wished to become an Oscar Mayer wiener by Helvetica.

== Production ==
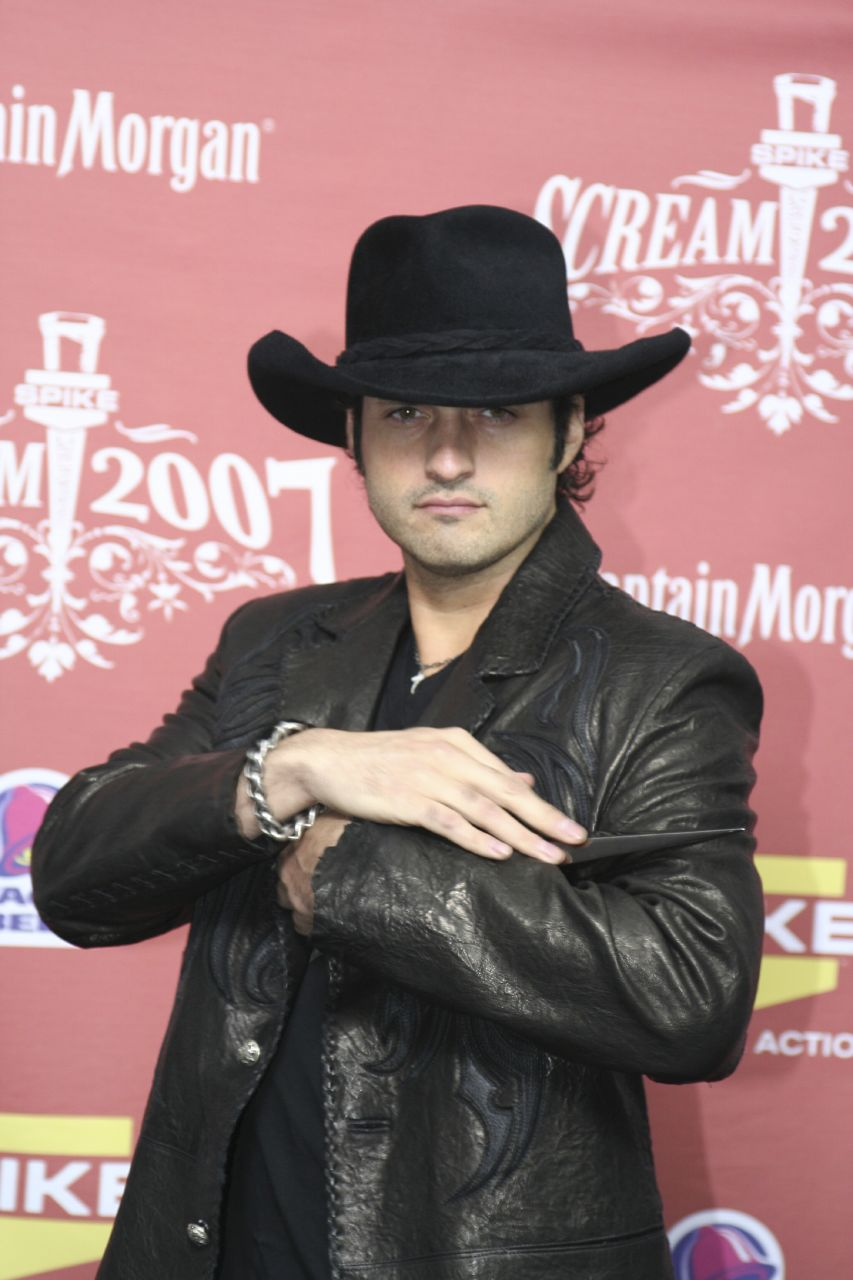
Spy Kids creator Robert Rodriguez is the film's director, producer, writer, editor, cinematographer and music composer.

On January 11, 2008, it was announced that Robert Rodriguez would direct, produce and write a 2009 American and Emirati live action and animated family science fiction fantasy adventure comedy movie which features live action and CGI animation titled Shorts also known as Shorts: The Adventures of the Wishing Rock.

On May 30, 2008, virtually the entire cast was revealed as Jon Cryer, James Spader, Leslie Mann, William H. Macy, Jimmy Bennett, Kat Dennings, Trevor Gagnon, Leo Howard, Devon Gearhart, Rebel Rodriguez, Jake Short and Jolie Vanier.

Shorts: The Adventures of the Wishing Rock was filmed in Austin, Texas. The special effects were done by KNB EFX Group, Troublemaker Digital Studios and Hybride Technologies for the animation.

George Oldziey, Robert Rodriguez and Carl Thiel scored the music for the film on its soundtrack and the film's soundtrack contains "Spy Ballet" performed by Robert Rodriguez and "Summer Never Ends" performed by Jimmy Bennett. Warner Bros. Pictures distributed the film.

== Release ==
Shorts: The Adventures of the Wishing Rock was released in cinemas on August 21, 2009, in the US by Warner Bros. Pictures, and on DVD and Blu-ray on November 24, 2009, by Warner Home Video.

== Reception ==
=== Critical response ===
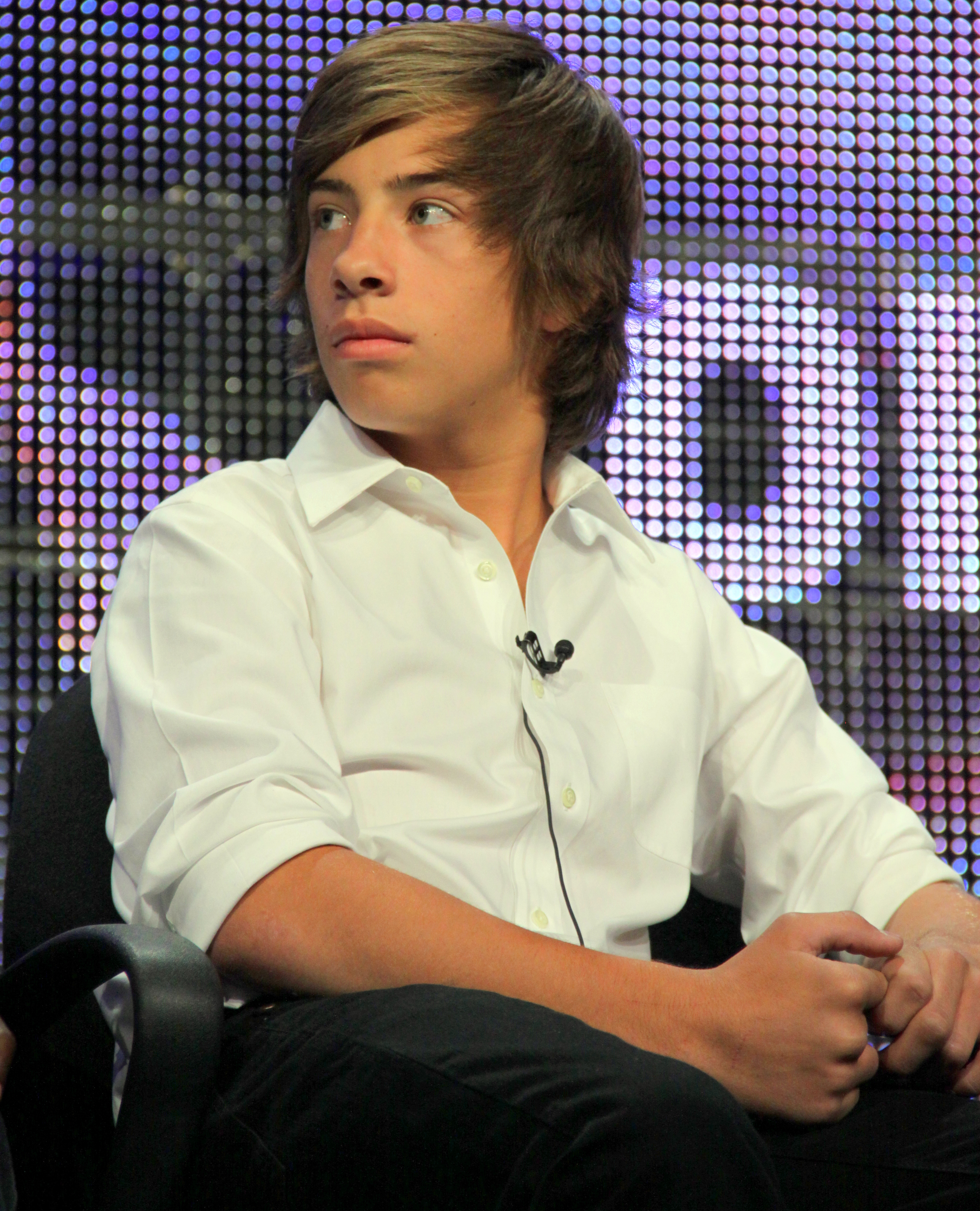
Jimmy Bennett was praised by critics for his performance.

The film holds a 46% approval rating on critical response aggregation website Rotten Tomatoes, based on 102 reviews. The site's critical consensus reads: "Shorts has imagination and energy, but most viewers beyond elementary school will likely tire of the kiddie humor and sensory overload." On Metacritic, the film holds a score of 53 out of 100, based on 22 critics, indicating "mixed or average reviews". Audiences polled by CinemaScore gave the film an average of "C+" on an A+ to F scale.

Sandie Angulo Chen of Common Sense Media gave the film four stars out of five, saying it was "funny, imaginative fantasy from Spy Kids director." Sue Pierman of the Milwaukee Journal Sentinel gave the film 1.5 stars out of four, saying it was a "great waste of talented supporting actors."

=== Box office ===
For its opening weekend, the film made $6.4 million, an average of $2,065 per each of 3,105 theaters. It opened at #6, being overshadowed by Inglourious Basterds, G.I. Joe: The Rise of Cobra, and Julie & Julia. Overall, the film grossed about $20.9 million in the United States and Canada, and about $29 million worldwide.

=== Awards ===
List of awards and nominations
Award	Category	Nominee	Result
Young Artist Awards 2010	Best Performance in a Feature Film - Young Ensemble Cast	Jimmy Bennett, Jake Short, Devon Gearhart, Leo Howard, Jolie Vanier, Trevor Gagnon	Won
Young Artist Awards 2010	Best Performance in a Feature Film - Leading Young Actress	Jolie Vanier	Nominated

== Soundtrack ==
Shorts: The Adventures of the Wishing Rock

Soundtrack album / Film score by George Oldziey, Robert Rodriguez and Carl Thiel
- Released: 2009
- Recorded: 2006–2009
- Genres: Movie Soundtrack, Film Score
- Label: Warner Bros. Records
- Producer: Robert Rodriguez

Robert Rodriguez film soundtrack chronology
Planet Terror (2007)	Shorts: The Adventures of the Wishing Rock (2009)	Machete (2010)

Singles from Shorts: The Adventures of the Wishing Rock: Original Motion Picture Soundtrack
- 1. "Summer Never Ends" Released: 2009

George Oldziey, Robert Rodriguez and Carl Thiel scored the music for the film on its soundtrack and the film's soundtrack contains "Spy Ballet" performed by Robert Rodriguez and "Summer Never Ends" performed by Jimmy Bennett. The soundtrack was released in 2009 by Warner Bros. Records.

Songs and music

- Spy Ballet – Robert Rodriguez
- Summer Never Ends – Jimmy Bennett
- It's Not Just Make Believe - Kari Kimmel
- I Predict a Riot - Kaiser Chiefs
- Never Alone - Barlowgirl
- All Music – Composed by George Oldziey, Robert Rodriguez and Carl Thiel

== Video game adaptation ==
A Wii and Nintendo DS video game of the same name was announced on June 23, 2009, with a prospective July release date in advance of the film's release, while the DS version was released, the Wii version was canceled.
