= Canvas (2006 film) =

- Directed by: Joseph Greco
- Written by: Joseph Greco
- Produced by: Lucy Hammel; Bill Erfurth; Adam Hammel; Sharon Lane; Joe Pantoliano
- Starring: Joe Pantoliano; Marcia Gay Harden; Devon Gearhart; Sophia Bairley; Marcus Johns; Antony Del Rio
- Cinematography: Rob Sweeney
- Edited by: Nina Kawasaki
- Music by: Joel Goodman
- Production companies: LMG Pictures; Canvas Pictures; Rebellion Pictures
- Distributed by: Screen Media Films
- Release dates: October 2006 (Hamptons); October 12, 2007 (United States)
- Running time: 101 minutes
- Country: United States
- Language: English

Canvas is a 2006 drama film written and directed by Joseph Greco about a Florida family dealing with a mother who has schizophrenia. The film premiered October 2006 at the Hamptons International Film Festival in New York. Greco said the film was inspired from his childhood experiences with a schizophrenic mother.

== Plot ==
Eleven-year-old Chris Marino returns home after a brief stay with relatives, prompted by his mother Mary's worsening schizophrenia. At home, Mary's delusions and paranoia draw neighborhood scorn and repeated police visits. Her condition culminates in a violent episode in which she grabs a knife; Chris intervenes and is accidentally cut on the arm, after which officers Baker Act her and she is institutionalized. Chris is left in the care of his father, John, who begins building a sailboat in the family driveway as a personal project.

While Mary receives treatment, John visits her regularly, bringing art supplies and inquiring about experimental medications not yet released. He also cautiously raises with Chris the possibility of sending him to stay with Aunt Joanne in Alaska until things stabilize. Meanwhile, mounting medical bills strain the household. When John asks his longtime boss and friend Hector for a long-promised raise, he is repeatedly put off. Hector later visits, mocks the half-built boat as foolish, and eventually fires John amid the company's financial difficulties. City officials, responding to a neighbor's complaint, forbid construction in the driveway, forcing John to relocate the boat to the backyard; the neighbor then erects a fence along the property line. An elderly marina owner later donates old sails and a good-luck charm for the bow.

At school, Chris copes by customizing T-shirts after classmates admire a patch sewn by his mother. He begins taking orders from fellow students and forms a tentative friendship—and budding romance—with classmate Dawn, who gives him an old shirt to personalize. Increasingly isolated, Chris skips classes to fish alone at the beach.

A supervised Thanksgiving outing with Mary ends in public embarrassment when the restaurant runs out of pumpkin pie, John confronts the staff, and Mary becomes agitated. On a later permitted home visit for Chris's birthday, Mary impulsively drives John's truck to the roller rink where Chris is celebrating with friends, arriving unannounced with a homemade cake, party hats, and noisemakers. Mortified by the disruption in front of his peers, Chris lashes out at her, telling her to leave. The two later reconcile privately at home, where Mary acknowledges her illness plainly but expresses belief that it is treatable.

Resentment builds between father and son over the boat's demands on John's attention. The tension erupts after Hector's son taunts Chris about his mother's institutionalization; Chris fights back and is suspended. John reprimands him harshly at home. In response, Chris damages the boat and threatens to call Aunt Joanne and leave permanently. John confronts him honestly, admitting he misses the woman Mary once was and shares his son's pain. They reach a fragile understanding. Shortly after, Hector comes to the house and fires John, citing lost business and the struggling economy. John does not raise his voice, responding instead with a quiet accounting of his twenty years of service, the raise that was never given, and the medical bills that have gone unpaid. Hector leaves without a word.

The next morning, Chris repairs the hull and proposes they finish the boat together. Over the following weeks they complete the vessel with help from friends. Mary's paintings are incorporated into the patched sails. To get it out of the enclosed backyard, John and Chris quietly dismantle and later reassemble the neighbor's fence under cover of night.

With the boat ready, Chris tells Dawn he may spend the summer in Alaska. Their understated farewell ends with a cheek kiss after she beats him in a bike race to the lighthouse. John receives word that Mary has been cleared for a weekend visit, but when they arrive to pick her up, she gently declines, insisting they enjoy the outing without her.

Father and son take the boat out together for the first time. On the water, John teaches Chris the basics and shares the story of how he met Mary at a sailing class years earlier—how he nearly capsized trying to impress her on their third date, and how she named Chris after Saint Christopher, patron saint of travelers. When Chris notes how beautiful she still is, John apologizes that she could not join them. Chris replies that someday she will. The question of Alaska remains gently open between them.

The film closes with all three Marinos aboard the boat together, the camera eventually revealing it is being towed slowly along a road outside the institution rather than sailing on open water, quietly fulfilling the hope Chris expressed moments earlier—as the family "sails" in place, going nowhere and everywhere at once.

== Cast ==
- Joe Pantoliano as John Marino
- Marcia Gay Harden as Mary Marino
- Devon Gearhart as Chris Marino
- Sophia Bairley as Dawn
- Marcus Johns as Sam
- Antony Del Rio as Gregg

== Production ==
Director Joseph Greco said, "The movie is certainly inspired by my mother, but I wouldn't say it's the exact same as my childhood. I didn't feel compelled to stick to the facts entirely. I would say it tells the emotional truth about my father and I coping the best we could." Joe Pantoliano served as a producer for the film and helped Greco to develop the idea.

During the film's third week of shooting on October 24, 2005, Hurricane Wilma made landfall in Florida and nearly shut down the production, but after waiting out the hurricane, cast and crew were able to persevere and complete the film.

The film was shot in Fort Lauderdale, Hollywood and Miami, Florida, from October to November 2005.

== Release ==
The film premiered at the Hamptons International Film Festival in October 2006 and was shown later that year at the Fort Lauderdale International Film Festival on November 12, 2006. It premiered in Germany on February 10, 2007, at the European Film Market and premiered in France on May 21, 2007, at the Cannes Film Market.

Canvas has also been shown at the AFI Dallas International Film Festival, the Sedona International Film Festival, the Nantucket Film Festival, and the Sarasota Film Festival.

The film opened in limited release in the United States on October 12, 2007.

== Critical reception ==
On the review aggregator Rotten Tomatoes, 78% of critics gave the film positive reviews, based on 27 reviews. The site's critics consensus reads, "Canvas is a faithful portrayal of mental illness highlighted by terrific performances." On Metacritic, the film has an average score of 67 out of 100, based on 10 reviews.

Writing for Variety, John Anderson said Greco "has constructed a story that works both as a domestic drama and an allegory about mental illness and art." Roger Ebert of the Chicago Sun-Times gave the film 3 out of 4 stars and wrote, "The portrayal of schizophrenia in the film has been praised by mental health experts as unusually accurate and sympathetic." Harden and Pantoliano's performances received much praise, with Jason Anderson of the Toronto Star writing of the latter in particular: "Best known for playing fork-tongued dirtbags in Memento and The Matrix, he proves to be far more appealing in the quieter role of a man who is fundamentally decent but unsure how to relate to his troubled wife and bewildered son." Variety commented Pantoliano gives a "cliche-demolishing performance as a sensitive family man who loves his wife no matter how paranoid, delusional or destructive she becomes." Anderson of the Toronto Star added, "Equally admirable is Greco's determination not to sensationalize the subject of schizophrenia. Instead, he keeps the disease firmly within a believable and thoroughly ordinary context."

=== Awards ===
At the Fort Lauderdale International Film Festival, the film won the Audience Award and Joe Pantoliano won the Best Dramatic Performance Award. At the Sedona International Film Festival, the film won the Best Feature Film Award and Pantoliano won the Outstanding Acting Award. The film also won Audience Awards at the Nantucket Film Festival and the Sarasota Film Festival. The National Alliance on Mental Illness awarded the film with the Outstanding Media Award for dramatic motion picture.
