= Eyeborgs =

- Directed by: Richard Clabaugh
- Written by: Fran Clabaugh; Richard Clabaugh
- Starring: Adrian Paul; Megan Blake; Luke Eberl
- Cinematography: Kenneth Wilson II
- Edited by: Fran Clabaugh
- Distributed by: Crimson Wolf Productions
- Release date: April 29, 2009 (Sci-Fi-London)
- Country: United States
- Language: English
- Budget: $3.7 million US$ (estimated)

Eyeborgs is a 2009 American science fiction film. It was released direct-to-video on July 6, 2010.

== Plot ==
The movie opens by explaining current events such as the passing of the "Freedom of Observation Act" and the subsequent implementation of ODIN (Optical Defense Intelligence Network), including the development of a new type of mobile camera drone, the eponymous "eyeborg". The system is administered by the Department of Homeland Security (DHS).

Sankur (Dale Girard) is making a deal to purchase a shotgun while an eyeborg watches the transaction. The eyeborg is discovered and the deal is aborted. Homeland Security agents rush in to find that Sankur has escaped and the other party in the gun deal is dead.

Brandon (Devin McGee), the lead singer of a band known as "Painful Daze", is in a car with a girl. "G-Man" (Danny Trejo), approaches them to deliver a rare bag of banned North Carolina tobacco. After G-Man leaves, the two begin smoking the tobacco - but are interrupted and killed by a large six-armed eyeborg.

With Brandon missing, Jarett (Luke Eberl) becomes the lead singer of "Painful Daze" at the next night's gig. As he sings, eyeborgs search for Sankur, who has entered the building. They signal an alarm that causes a panic, during which Sankur tries to shoot Jarett. An eyeborg blocks the shot. Jarett falls, unharmed, but breaks his guitar. It is revealed that Jarett is the President's nephew.

Sankur is captured and taken to the regional DHS office. During interrogation, Sankur is shown video footage of his earlier gun deal, showing him to be the dealer's killer. Sankur protests his innocence despite the apparent proof of the video. Agent Gunner (Adrian Paul) gets a message to report to the front desk, leaves the room with his partner, and locks the door. Four eyeborg security cameras detach to attack Sankur, but the door opens, allowing him to escape. A foot chase occurs, stranding him on level six. When the elevator he is waiting for opens, a large eyeborg emerges and pushes him over the banister, causing him to fall to his death.

Jarett and Ronni (Julie Horner) are making out when the news is announced that the President has declared war on the (fictional) country of Zimbekistan, which catches Ronni's attention. She shows Jarett a bank error where a large sum of money has been deposited in their account from Zimbekistan.

Back at the regional DHS office, Agent Gunner comes under fire over security footage showing that he failed to lock Sankur's door. Meanwhile, Barbara (Megan Blake) (newswoman) and Eric (Juan-Carlos Guzman) (cameraman), who earlier witnessed Sankur's death, find a video file in Sankur's apartment. Meanwhile, Jarett goes to G-Man, whose face is finally revealed, and asks him to fix his guitar. During their meeting they discuss the eyeborgs, which Jarett approves of and which G-Man doesn't trust.

Eric analyzes the video from Sankur's apartment and calls Barbara to tell her the video file is fake. En route in a news van to give her the evidence, he is attacked by a new type of eyeborg. It force feeds him a bottle of whiskey and causes him to crash, attempting to make it look like the result of drunk driving. While he manages to get out of the news van alive, he is immolated by a flamethrower carried by the eyeborg that attacked him. Barbara is notified of the wreck and, when told that he was drunk at the time of the accident, she doesn't believe it. Shortly thereafter, G-Man is attacked and killed by a large eyeborg. Jarett arrives and is momentarily pinned to the ground by the escaping eyeborg, after which he finds G-Man's body. He tells Gunner what he saw, but video of the alley shows a human leaving G-Man's place rather than an eyeborg.

Growing increasingly suspicious, Gunner asks Jarett to meet him and tells him that he believes that Jarett did see an eyeborg leaving the scene of G-Man's murder, and that he suspects that the system is compromised and that the President may be in danger. He asks Jarett for help in warning the President, since Jarett has been asked to play at the President's campaign debate. While Jarett is out, Ronni is attacked by two eyeborgs and manages to call him, but the call is cut short. When he arrives, he finds her dead, with her wrists slit as though she has committed suicide.

Jim Bradley (John S. Rushton) and Gunner go back to G-Man's to see if they missed anything. They find a secret room containing plans for weapon-carrying eyeborgs, plus a malleable C4 variant which was formed into the pickguard on Jarett's guitar. They try to leave to warn the President that Jarett's guitar is a bomb but Jim is killed by an eyeborg, which Gunner manages to disable. Gunner gets to the Millennium Center, where the Presidential debate is being held. But when he arrives on stage, there is no President or crowd present. He realizes that the President is dead, and that ODIN is in control and has been using Presidential power to declare war so that it can spread.

A group of warbots shows up and begins firing on the DHS agents. Barbara is run into by her new camera bot, but she tells Gunner where he can find Jarett. Gunner and his team manage to free Jarett, whose likeness is being scanned for use by ODIN, just as two newer and more deadly eyeborgs attack and kill all but Jarett, Gunner, and Barbara. As Gunner is leaving with Jarett, Barbara gives him the only video evidence of what happened at the Millennium Center. Too injured to leave herself, she shoots the eyeborgs to distract them before shooting the guitar, detonating it and the barrels of flammable liquid in the basement, destroying the Millennium Center.

With the explosion of the Millennium Center broadcast on national television, the President is considered dead. The news shows the vice-president being sworn in, and in an address to the public declares Jarett a traitor and shows video of him detonating his guitar in the debates, killing the President and all in attendance. Gunner goes to see Jarett, who is alive and disguised as an altar boy, and tells him that Barbara's video has gone viral and even ODIN cannot stop it.

The movie ends with Gunner shooting an eyeborg in an alley and declaring he does not need their eyes anymore.

== Reception ==
Eyeborgs had its world premiere at Sci-Fi-London on 29 April 2009 where it received generally positive reviews.

== Cast ==
- Adrian Paul as R.J. "Gunner" Reynolds
- Megan Blake as Barbara Hawkins
- Luke Eberl as Jarett Hewes
- Brandon Adams as Jarett's Body Double
- Julie Horner as Ronni
- Emad Aly as Party Goer
- James D. Ballard as David
- Danny Trejo as "G-Man"
- Juan-Carlos Guzman as Eric
- John S. Rushton as Jim Bradley
- Devin McGee as Brandon
- Tim Bell as DHS Agent Sanchez
- Joshua Brocki as Bar Boy #1
- James Marshall Case as Thomas Rutledge
- Chuck Coyl as DHS Agent Coil
- Alexandra Dimopoulos as Cigarette Girl
- Ambrose Ferber as DHS Agent Bross
- Vinny Genna as Inspector Hewett
- Lovinder Gill as Supreme Court Chief Justice
- Dale Girard as Sankur

== See also ==
- List of films featuring surveillance
