= Windsor (film) =

- Directed by: Porter Farrell
- Written by: Porter Farrell
- Produced by: Adam Dietrich; Suzanne Weinert
- Starring: Madelyn Deutch; Quinn Shephard; Nick Krause; Adam Hicks; Peyton Clark; Ian Colletti; Barry Corbin; Stelio Savante
- Cinematography: Josh Pickering
- Edited by: Matt Brundige; Mark Hovland
- Music by: Andy R. Jordan
- Production company: Turnpike Pictures
- Release date: March 22, 2015 (Garden State Film Festival)
- Running time: 97 minutes
- Country: United States
- Language: English

Windsor is a 2015 American independent drama film written, directed and produced by Porter Farrell and starring Madelyn Deutch, Quinn Shephard, Nick Krause, Adam Hicks, Peyton Clark, Ian Colletti and Barry Corbin. The film is Farrell's directorial debut.

== Plot ==
In their last year of high school, six best friends prepare to leave their small, struggling hometown, a place caught in the slow, fine-grinding wheels of American big business that seem to leave no side doors.

Maisie, whose father is about to be released from prison, decides she can't leave the town where she has been embraced so lovingly since the dark day when her father nearly killed the man whose company foreclosed on their family farm. The town's patriarch, Gil Denton, a no nonsense, wealthy landowner dying from cancer, loves these six kids, and in his remaining time with them he serves as a sounding board, dependable guide, and sympathetic friend - while providing them a wistful link to a past they will never know.

Set in current time, the story shows that small town values are worth saving and that the mouse does indeed occasionally roar.

== Cast ==
- Madelyn Deutch as Maisie
- Quinn Shephard as Kat
- Nick Krause as Lawton
- Adam Hicks as Clint
- Peyton Clark as Itchy
- Ian Colletti as Jesse
- Barry Corbin as Gil Denton
- Mackenzie Astin as Harry Barnett
- Stelio Savante as Pierre Gandy
- Emily Warfield as Carolyn Barnett
- Sonny Carl Davis as Kline
- Richard Jackson as Tommy
- Libby Villari as Louise
- Rodger Boyce as Parole Board Chairman
- Greg Williams as Radio DJ

== Production ==
Farrell had written the part of Gil Denton specifically for Corbin to portray. Early in development, Jake T. Austin was attached to the project. The film was shot in Gainesville, Texas.

== Awards ==
The film won Best Narrative Feature at the Garden State Film Festival in New Jersey.
