= Gary Wheeler (filmmaker) =

Film producer from North Carolina

- Born: New York, United States
- Education: Appalachian State University; Regent University
- Occupations: Producer; Director
- Years active: 1990s-present
- Employer(s): Level Path Productions (founder); INSP Films

Gary Wheeler is an American filmmaker, producer and director, who resides in North Carolina. He founded Level Path Productions in 2004, and subsequently worked on a number of films such as The List in 2007 and Heart of Christmas in 2011. In 2014, he joined INSP Films.

Over the past couple of decades, Wheeler has worked on numerous films in writing, producing and directing capacities. This included directing numerous holiday films, including Christmas in the Smokies, Christmas on the Range and The Heart of Christmas. In more recent years he has worked on action/western films, including directing the 2023 film, Far Haven. He is currently working on the Blue Ridge series, which he serves as showrunner.

== Early life ==
Wheeler was born in New York, but spent most of his childhood in Charlotte, North Carolina. Growing up in North Carolina during the late 1970s and early 80s, he recalled in interviews watching classic TV series like I Love Lucy, Batman, and The Lone Ranger. While at high school he purchased his own VCR, further allowing him to delve into American film culture.

Wheeler took his interest of films and television into his education when he pursued a higher education at Appalachian State University, earning a Bachelor of Arts degree in Broadcasting and English. He started his graduate studies Regent University’s School of Communication & the Arts in 1994.

== Career ==
Beginning with his 2000 debut feature Final Solution which premiered on PBS, Wheeler made an immediate mark as a confident storyteller in the world of faith-based film. His second film, The List was adapted from a novel by Robert Whitlow, the legal thriller starred Malcolm McDowell and Hilarie Burton and showcased Wheeler’s early strength in adapting thoughtful, morally complex material into accessible, emotionally engaging cinema. He continued his collaboration with Whitlow on The Trial (2010), a courtroom drama featuring Matthew Modine as a grief-stricken attorney rediscovering purpose through a high-stakes case.

In 2011 Wheeler, released a made-for-television film, The Heart of Christmas, based on a true story. It stars Candace Cameron Bure, Jeanne Neilson, Eric Jay Beck, Christopher Shone and Matthew West in his film debut. He has also made another film with GMC called Somebody's Child. He then served as co-writer and producer on the 2013 feature film Jimmy, starring Kelly Carlson, Ted Levine, Ian Colletti, and directed by Mark Freiburger.

In 2016, Wheeler produced and co-wrote Savannah Sunrise, starring Shawnee Smith and Pamela Reed as mismatched travelers on a reluctant road trip, and Heritage Falls, a father-son bonding story led by David Keith. Though he did not direct either film, his signature themes—reconciliation, generational legacy, and community ties—remained intact. The next year, he returned to directing with Mountain Top, based on another Whitlow novel and starring Barry Corbin.

Wheeler then directed and produced Christmas on the Range, a rural romance starring Erin Cahill and Nicholas Gonzalez in 2019. Around this time, his work began shifting away from holiday dramas and toward modern Western and law enforcement narratives with INSP Films where he serves as VP of Original Films. He then worked on Blue Ridge, which followed a small-town sheriff played by Johnathon Schaech. Wheeler would go on to produce two more films in INSP's County Line series — No Fear and All In — starring Tom Wopat as an aging but principled sheriff navigating crime and corruption in the American South.

In 2023, Wheeler returned to directing with Far Haven, another INSP Western featuring Bailey Chase and Bruce Boxleitner. He also produced The Warrant: Breaker’s Law, continuing his contributions to INSP’s growing slate of family-friendly action dramas. His transition to a creator for television came in 2024 with the TV series Blue Ridge, a continuation of the 2020 film, where Wheeler again took on full creative control.

== Filmography ==
=== Films ===
Year	Title	Director	Producer	Writer
2007	The List	Yes	Yes	Yes
2010	The Trial	Yes	Yes	Yes
2011	The Heart of Christmas	Yes	No	No
2013	The Perfect Summer	Yes	Yes	Yes
2015	Christmas in the Smokies	Yes	Yes	Yes
2016	Savannah Sunrise	No	Yes	Yes
2016	Heritage Falls	No	Yes	Yes
2017	Mountain Top	Yes	Yes	Yes
2017	Christmas on the Coast	Yes	Yes	Yes
2018	County Line	No	Yes	No
2019	Christmas on the Range	Yes	Yes	No
2020	The Warrant	No	Yes	No
2020	Blue Ridge	No	No	Yes
2022	County Line: No Fear	No	Yes	No
2022	County Line: All In	No	Yes	No
2023	Far Haven	Yes	Yes	No
2023	The Warrant: Breaker's Law	No	Yes	No

=== Television ===
Year	Title	Director	Producer	Writer
2024–present	Blue Ridge	Yes	Yes	Yes
