= Heritage Falls =

- Directed by: Shea Sizemore
- Written by: Rhonda Baraka; Shea Sizemore; Gary Wheeler
- Produced by: Gary Wheeler; Jason White
- Starring: David Keith
- Cinematography: Brent Christy
- Edited by: Jonathan Olive
- Music by: Rob Pottorf
- Production company: INSP Films
- Distributed by: Imagicomm Entertainment
- Release date: September 2, 2016
- Running time: 92 minutes
- Country: United States
- Language: English

Heritage Falls is a 2016 American comedy-drama film starring David Keith.

== Plot ==
Three men reconciling generational differences on a camping retreat - son, father, and grandfather bonding

== Cast ==
- David Keith as Coach Charlie Fitzpatrick
- Coby Ryan McLaughlin as Charles 'Evan' Fitzpatrick Jr.
- Keean Johnson as Markie Fitzpatrick
- Nancy Stafford as Laura Fitzpatrick
- Toochukwu T.C. Anyachonkeya as Alumni #3
- J.D. Banks as Alumni #2
- Graham Eugene Adrian as Alumni #1
- Vitaly Andrew LeBeau as Young Evan
- Gary Ray Moore as Referee
- Devon Ogden as Harriet 'Harvey' Fitzpatrick
- Sydney Penny as Heather Fitzpatrick
- T.C. Stallings as Principal Joe Allen

== Production ==
The film was shot in Stephens County, Georgia, particularly in Toccoa.

Filming began in April 2016.

== Reception ==
Edwin L. Carpenter of The Dove Foundation gave the film a positive review and wrote, "The story, the character growth, and the message are inspired. The film makes it clear: people can grow in their relationships, and even change."
