= Lost Stallions: The Journey Home =

- Directed by: David Rotan
- Written by: Lovinder Gill
- Produced by: Frank Gibson; Jerome Pettaman; David Rotan
- Starring: Mickey Rooney; Jan Rooney; Megan Blake
- Cinematography: John Rotan
- Edited by: Brad Lambert
- Music by: John Baumbach
- Release date: 2008
- Running time: 86 minutes
- Country: United States
- Language: English

Lost Stallions: The Journey Home is a 2008 family/drama film directed by David Rotan and starring Mickey Rooney.

== Plot ==
After the death of his father, troubled teen Jake (Alex Hugh) travels with his mother to Harmony Ranch, a special retreat for families dealing with problems. There, Jake gets to know Troubadour, a young distressed stallion. Ranch owner Chief (Mickey Rooney), works to calm the uneasy horse. Jake witnesses Chief's determination with the stallion, and begins to see the wisdom in the old man's life. When Troubadour runs away, Jake makes it his mission to bring the lost stallion home. The ranch hand Grey Wolf (Roger Willie) explains to Jake the Native American legend of Heaven's Pathway, a mountain that towers over Harmony Ranch, said to be a place where wounded souls go to find peace. With this knowledge, Jake sets out with his new friends Nicki (Rachael Handy) and Isaac (Evan Tilson Stroud), two other troubled teens, on a journey to the top of Heaven's Pathway in search of Troubadour.

== Cast ==
- Alex Hugh as Jake
- Mickey Rooney as Chief
- Jan Rooney as Kate
- Megan Blake as Rachel
- Rachael Handy as Nicki
- R. Keith Harris as Mack
- Evan Tilson Stroud as Isaac
- Roger Willie as Grey Wolf
- Trey Vickers as Bullied Teen
- Robert Boyles as Gang Member 1
- Alan Kachur as Joey

== See also ==
- List of films about horses
