= The Girl Who Believes in Miracles =

2021 film directed by Richard Correll

- Theatrical release poster
- Directed by: Richard Correll
- Written by: Richard Correll; G.M. Mercier
- Produced by: Richard Correll; Laurence Jaffe; Terry Rindal; Kevin Waller
- Starring: Mira Sorvino; Austyn Johnson; Burgess Jenkins; Tommi Rose; Stephanie Cood; Paul-Mikel Williams; Luke Harmon; Kevin Sorbo; Peter Coyote
- Cinematography: Ryan Correll
- Edited by: Kelly King; Mark David Spencer
- Music by: Craig Flaster
- Production companies: 120dB Films; Gerson Productions; The Mustard Seed Production; Trailmaker Productions
- Distributed by: Atlas Distribution Company
- Release date: April 2, 2021
- Running time: 100 minutes
- Country: United States
- Language: English
- Budget: $3 million
- Box office: $3.2 million

The Girl Who Believes in Miracles is a 2021 American Christian drama film directed and produced by Richard Correll. The film stars Mira Sorvino, Peter Coyote, Austyn Johnson, and Kevin Sorbo. The Girl Who Believes in Miracles was released on April 2, 2021, produced by 120 dB Films, Gerson Productions, The Mustard Seed Production, and Trailmaker Productions. It was distributed by Atlas Distribution Company.

== Plot ==
Sara Hopkins is a young kind girl with a strong faith in God. One day, when she's at the lake with her brother, Danny, and his girlfriend, Cindy, Sara finds a dead bird, but thinks she can pray to God to revive it and she does, though her family is skeptical. Later, when Danny saves his rival, Alvie, from being hit by a car, Alvie's dog is hit instead, and the dog is miraculously brought back to life by Sara, to everyone's astonishment. Inspired, Sara's best friend, Mark, a paraplegic who uses a wheelchair, asks Sara to pray with him, and ultimately, he is able to walk again. Sara becomes a national celebrity when more miracles are attributed to her, and she begins to heal blind and sick children. Sara's family becomes concerned when Sara falls after praying many times, and learn that she is dying of an inoperable brain tumor.

The doctor suggests that they take Sara to the hospital to make her comfortable, but Sara wants to go to the lake where she first saw God, so her Grandpa makes a plan with the townsfolk to break her out of the hospital. They succeed and rush to the lake against her parents' wishes and when they get there, God appears and Sara's spirit appears before him and they both disappear while everyone mourns her death. However, Danny discovers a painting of her leaving God to go back to her family, meaning she's still alive so he prays for her to come back and she awakens, much to everyone’s joy. Humbly, she tells everyone that God healed those people, and she simply did what he told her to do.

== Cast ==
- Mira Sorvino as Bonnie Hopkins
- Kevin Sorbo as Dr. Ben Riley
- Peter Coyote as Sam Donovan
- Tommi Rose as Cindy Kramer
- Austyn Johnson as Sara Hopkins
- Darryl Cox as Pastor Jerry ‘Mac’ Macmillan
- Burgess Jenkins as Alex Hopkins
- Luke Omalza as Danny Hopkins
- Paul-Mikel Williams as Mark Miller
- David Burkhart as Reporter

== Release ==
The film was theatrically released in the United States on April 2, 2021.

=== Home media ===
The film was released on digital platforms on June 1, 2021.
