= Shifting Gears (film) =

- Directed by: Jason Winn
- Written by: R. Keith Harris
- Produced by: R. Keith Harris; Matthew R. Zboyovski
- Starring: R. Keith Harris; Brooke Langton; Adam Hicks; C. Thomas Howell; John Ratzenberger
- Cinematography: James Suttles
- Edited by: Eric Strand
- Music by: Chris Heckman
- Release date: March 23, 2018
- Running time: 102 minutes
- Country: United States
- Language: English

Shifting Gears is a 2018 American comedy-drama film written by R. Keith Harris, directed by Jason Winn and starring Harris, Brooke Langton, Adam Hicks, C. Thomas Howell and John Ratzenberger.

== Cast ==
- R. Keith Harris as Tom Williamson
- Brooke Langton as Carol Williamson
- Adam Hicks as Jeremy Williamson
- Tate Clemons as Stephy Williamson
- C. Thomas Howell as Jenkins
- John Ratzenberger as Conrad Baines
- M.C. Gainey as Dirty Harry Hawkins
- M. Emmet Walsh as Hank

== Release ==
The film was released on March 23, 2018.

== Reception ==
Renee Longstreet of Common Sense Media awarded the film two stars out of five. Alan Ng of Film Threat awarded the film three stars out of five.

Gary Goldstein of the Los Angeles Times gave the film a negative review and wrote, "Dirt track racing may have its fans, but in Shifting Gears it doesn’t prove a particularly exciting arena around which to build a heartland-friendly family comedy."
