= Savannah Sunrise =

- Directed by: Randall Stevens
- Screenplay by: James Mitchell; Thomas Torrey; Gary Wheeler
- Produced by: Richard Clark Jr. Gary Wheeler
- Starring: Shawnee Smith; Pamela Reed; Clare Carey; Shawn Christian
- Cinematography: Brad Walker
- Edited by: Jonathan Olive
- Music by: Rob Pottorf
- Production companies: INSP Films; Imagicomm Films; Orca Entertainment Group
- Distributed by: Imagicomm Entertainment
- Release date: May 6, 2016 (limited)
- Running time: 88 minutes
- Country: United States
- Language: English

Savannah Sunrise is a 2016 American comedy film directed by Randall Stevens and starring Shawnee Smith, Pamela Reed, Clare Carey and Shawn Christian.

== Cast ==
- Shawnee Smith as Joy
- Pamela Reed as Loraine
- Shawn Christian as Phil
- Clare Carey as Angie
- Madelyn Cline as Willow
- Vitaly Andrew LeBeau as Ryan

== Production ==
The film was shot in Augusta, Georgia and Indian Land, South Carolina. Principal photography wrapped in late March 2016.

== Reception ==
Barbara Shulgasser-Parker of Common Sense Media awarded the film one star out of five.
