= Devon Gearhart =

American actor (born 1995)

- Born: May 5, 1995 (age 30); Atlanta, Georgia, U.S.
- Occupation: Actor
- Years active: 2004–present

Devon Gearhart (born May 5, 1995) is an American actor.

== Early life ==
Gearhart was born and raised in Atlanta, Georgia, and began acting at the age of seven, landing national commercials with Burger King, PBS, Pizza Hut and the Cartoon Network. Gearhart's movie debut came in 2004 when he landed the role of Young Bobby in Bobby Jones: Stroke of Genius.

== Career ==
Gearhart appeared in the television movies The Brooke Ellison Story directed by Christopher Reeve and Warm Springs, playing the son of Franklin Delano Roosevelt.

Gearhart landed lead roles in two independent films, with the stories of each film being told through the eyes of his characters. The first of the films was Canvas, in which he starred opposite Marcia Gay Harden and Joe Pantoliano. The second film was Dog Days of Summer in which he starred opposite Will Patton and Colin Ford. Earlier in 2005, Gearhart had starred as Jake in the Life Is My Movie production Little Men.

Gearhart portrayed Naomi Watts' and Tim Roth's son in Michael Haneke's Funny Games, which premiered at the 2008 Sundance Film Festival. Gearhart also appeared in Clint Eastwood's Changeling in 2008.

In 2009, he appeared in the Robert Rodriguez film Shorts. In addition to films, Gearhart has appeared in television shows, including Lost and Law & Order: SVU.

== Filmography ==
Year	Movie	Role	Notes
2004	Bobby Jones: Stroke of Genius	Young Bobby	
2004	The Brooke Ellison Story	Young Reed Ellison	
2005	Warm Springs	Elliott Roosevelt	
2006	Canvas	Chris Marino	
2007	Funny Games	Georgie	
2008	Changeling	Mike Spencer	
2008	Dog Days of Summer	Phillip Walden	
2009	Shorts	Colbert "Cole" Black	
2013	The Power of Few	Cory	
2013	The Wait	Ian	

== Television ==
Year	Title	Role	Notes
2009	Lost	Young Ethan	Episode: Dead is Dead
2010	Law and Order SVU	Micah Holbart	Episode: Merchandise
2015	Criminal Minds	Ezra Warren	Episode: A Place at the Table
