= Ian Colletti =

American actor (born 1997)

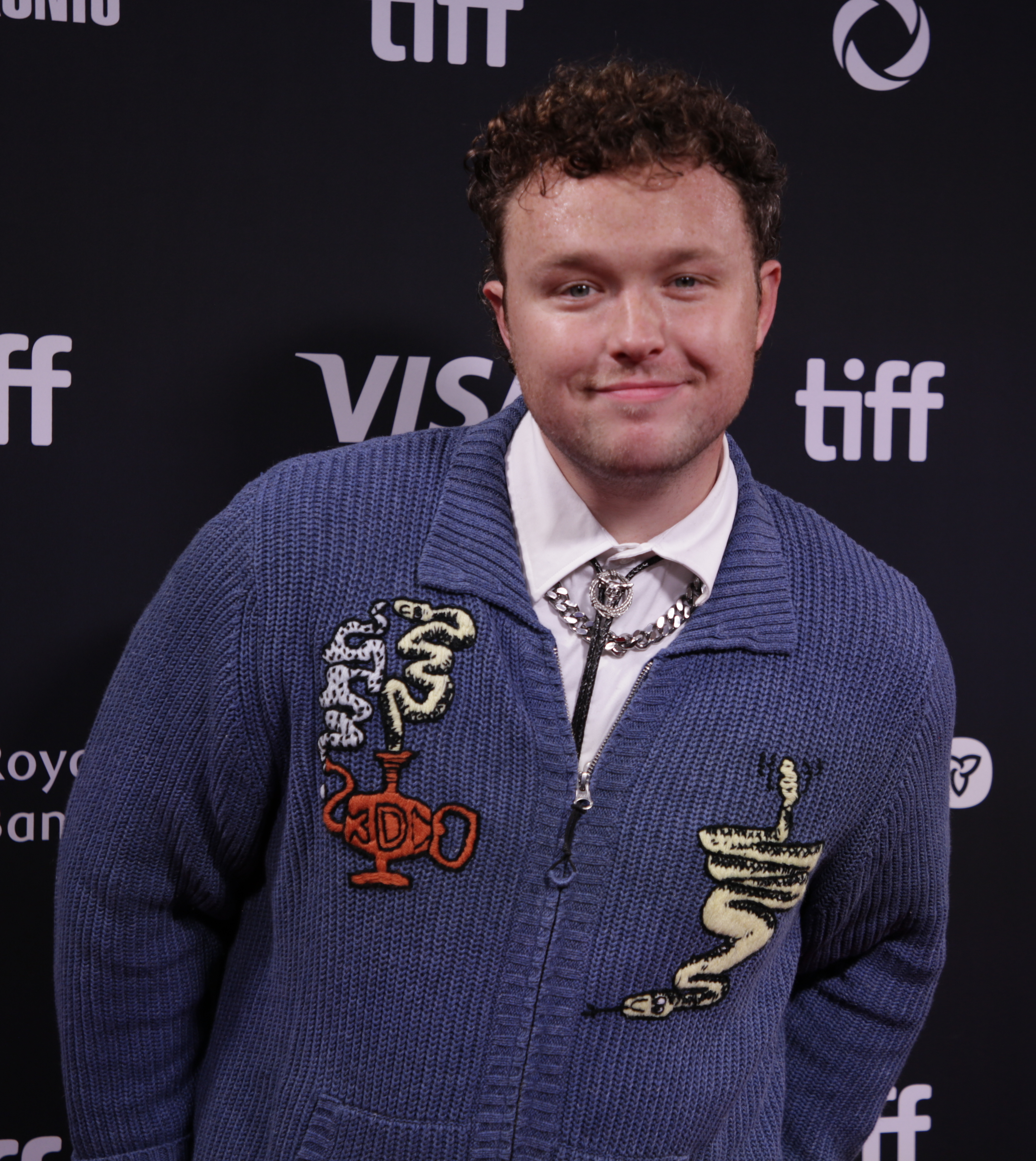
- Colletti in 2025 at TIFF.
- Born: March 4, 1997 (age 29); Monmouth County, New Jersey, U.S.
- Occupation: Actor
- Years active: 2004–present
- Relatives: Zoe Colletti (sister)

Ian Colletti (born March 3, 1997) is an American actor. He is best known for his role as Eugene "Arseface" Root in the AMC television series Preacher. He also played the teenage son of the title character on the American version of Rake. His younger sister is the actress Zoe Colletti.

As a child actor, Colletti made his television debut at the age of seven in an episode of Blue's Clues. He also appeared in an episode of The Sopranos and feature films like Baby Mama and Phoebe in Wonderland. He starred in the 2013 film Jimmy as a teenager with intellectual disability who interacts with supernatural beings.

== Acting credits ==
=== Film ===
Year	Title	Role	Notes
2008	Phoebe in Wonderland	Jamie Madison	
2008	Baby Mama	Caroline's 7-year-old	
2010	An Invisible Sign	Danny O'Mazzi	
2011	The Orphan Killer	Orphan Kid - basketball	
2013	Jimmy	Jimmy Mitchell	
2015	Windsor	Jesse	
2015	Till Dark	Ty	Short film
2017	Mohawk	Myles Holt	
2025	Swiped	JB	

=== Television ===
Year	Title	Role	Notes
2004	Blue's Clues	Joe's Friend	Episode: "Blue's Wishes"
2006	Waterfront	Danny	Episode: "Sting Like a Butterfly"
2007	The Sopranos	Kid	Episode: "The Blue Comet"
2010	Mercy	Patrick	2 episodes
2014	Rake	Finn Deane	Series regular, 13 episodes
2015	Blue Bloods	Eric Butler	Episode: "Backstabbers"
2016-2019	Preacher	Eugene 'Arseface' Root	Series regular, 43 episodes
2019	Lincoln Rhyme: Hunt for the Bone Collector	David Fleming	Episode: "God Complex"
2020	Billions	George Wagner	2 episodes
2021	The Hot Zone	Agent Chris Moore	Recurring, 6 episodes
2024	Law & Order: Special Victims Unit	Duvall Mathis	Episode: "The Punch List"
2025	The Rookie	Carl Ditweiler	Episode: "A Deadly Secret"
TBD	The Savant †	Aaron Miller	Recurring, 3 episodes

Key
†	Denotes television productions that have not yet been released
