= Ángel L. Malavé Zayas =

Puerto Rican politician

Mayor of Cidra
- In office January 2, 1989 – 2012
- Preceded by: Félix Agosto Reyes
- Succeeded by: Javier Carrasquillo

Personal details
- Born: Ángel Luis Malavé Zayas; March 17, 1939 Cidra, Puerto Rico
- Died: April 9, 2025 (aged 86) Cidra, Puerto Rico
- Party: New Progressive Party (PNP)
- Spouse: Carmen Gloria Ellsworth
- Occupation: Teacher, Politician

Ángel Luis "Wiso" Malavé Zayas was a Puerto Rican politician and former mayor of Cidra.

Malavé was elected as mayor of Cidra at the 1988 general elections. He was a teacher before being elected. He was reelected to the position in 1996, 2000, 2004, and 2008.

In 2011, Malavé was accused of 14 charges of lewd conduct against several employees of the municipality. In February of that year, a judge determined there was cause for trial in 11 of the 14 charges. He was found guilty of all charges and sentenced to 9 years of house arrest.

In November 2011, the evaluating committee of the New Progressive Party determined that Malavé was unable to run for reelection.

== Personal life ==
Malavé was married to Carmen Gloria Ellsworth since the 1960s. They have three children together. Before entering politics, Malavé studied pedagogy and worked as a schoolteacher in the Puerto Rico public school system.

== Death ==
Ángel L. Malavé Zayas died on April 9, 2025 at the age of 86. He was buried at Jardín del Eden Cemetery in Cidra, Puerto Rico.
