= Burgess Jenkins =

American actor (born 1973)

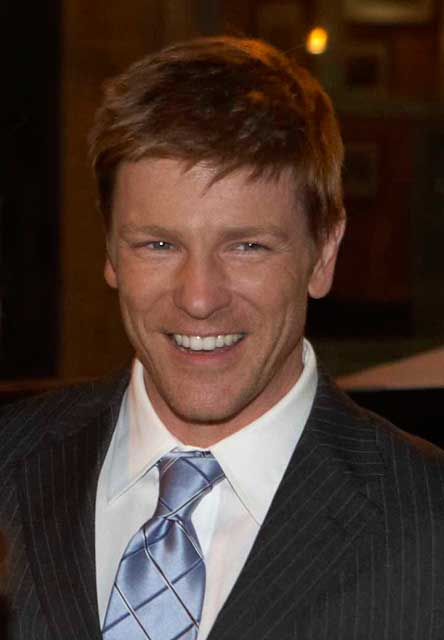
- Jenkins at the premiere of Wesley in 2008
- Born: October 24, 1973 (age 53); Winston-Salem, North Carolina, U.S.
- Occupations: Actor; producer
- Years active: 2000–present
- Spouse: Ashlee Payne

Burgess Jenkins (born October 24, 1973) is an American actor and director who has had a steady career in television and film for more than two decades. He is best known for his role as Bobby Irons on One Tree Hill, Ray Budds in the film Remember the Titans opposite Denzel Washington, and as Hilary Swank's husband David Winter in the film The Reaping (2007).

== Early life ==
Jenkins was born and raised in Winston-Salem, North Carolina and is a graduate of Richard J. Reynolds High School and Lenoir-Rhyne University.

Jenkins trained at the famed "Playhouse West" with Jeff Goldblum.

== Career ==
Jenkins portrayed religious leader John Wesley in the award-winning independent film Wesley (2009) with Kevin McCarthy and June Lockhart.

On television, Jenkins played Bobby Irons throughout season six on the hit CW series One Tree Hill, recurred on Marry Me with Lucy Liu and Tony & Ridley Scott's A&E Thriller COMA. He has guest starred on numerous shows including: Drop Dead Diva, Revolution, JAG and many more. Jenkins starred in the true story Unshackled with Stacy Keach and was nominated as Best Actor at the Boston Film Festival for his portrayal of Bruce Snow in Insignificant Others.

Jenkins appeared on ABC's Nashville as Randy Roberts, long-time friend and music producer to Rayna Jaymes (Connie Britton). The series reunited Jenkins with his Remember the Titans co-star Hayden Panettiere.

Jenkins signed onto season seven of the Lifetime Network's flagship original series Army Wives. He played Staff Sergeant Eddie Hall, married to Maggie Hall (Torrey DeVitto), as part of a new family entering the cast.

From 2014 to 2016, Jenkins played Billy Abbott in the Daytime Emmy-winning CBS soap opera The Young and the Restless.

In 2024, he featured in the first season of the TV series Blue Ridge, playing the role of Ryan Lucas.

== Filmography ==
=== Film ===
Year	Title	Role
2000	Unshackled	Harold Morris
2000	Remember the Titans	Ray Budds
2004	Broken	Peter
2006	Sea of Fear	Lance
2007	Fall Down Dead	Officer Earl Buchyk
2007	The Reaping	David Winter
2009	Wesley	John Wesley
2009	In/Significant Others	Bruce Snow
2009	Vault of Darkness	Marcus
2010	StaleMate	Rich
2010	The Trial	Harry O'Ryan
2011	Red Dirt Rising	Bill Blair
2011	The Key Man	Charles Hawthorne
2012	Susie's Hope	Roy Lawrence
2013	Jimmy	Jake Garner
2014	Hero	Joe Finn
2019	Noelle	Dan
2020	The Reason	Zach
2021	The Girl Who Believes in Miracles	Alex Hopkins

=== Television ===
Year	Title	Role	Note
2000	Dawson's Creek	Brad	Episode: "True Love"
2002	JAG	Lt. Jack Kersey	Episode: "Offensive Action"
2003	Good Morning, Miami	Jimmy	Episode: "The Ex Games"
2008–2009	One Tree Hill	Bobby Irons	12 episodes
2009	My Fake Fiancé	Steve	TV movie
2009	Army Wives	Major Kurt Dandridge	2 episodes
2010	Drop Dead Diva	ADA Dushay	Episode: "Begin Again"
2010	Christmas Cupid	Andrew Craig	
2010	Marry Me	Jeff Rumson	Miniseries
2011	The Shunning	John Beiler	
2011	The Heart of Christmas	Walt	
2012	Coma	Sean Berman	Miniseries
2012	Nashville	Randy Roberts	3 episodes
2012	Revolution	Lon Chetham	Episode: "No Quarter"
2013	Army Wives	SSG Eddie Hall	
2014–2016	The Young and the Restless	Billy Abbott	Regular series
2017	Christmas on the Coast	Bryce	Hallmark Movie
2024	Blue Ridge	Ryan Lucas	Regular series

Preceded by David Tom	Billy Abbott (role); 2014–16	Succeeded by Jason Thompson
