= Megan Blake =

American actress

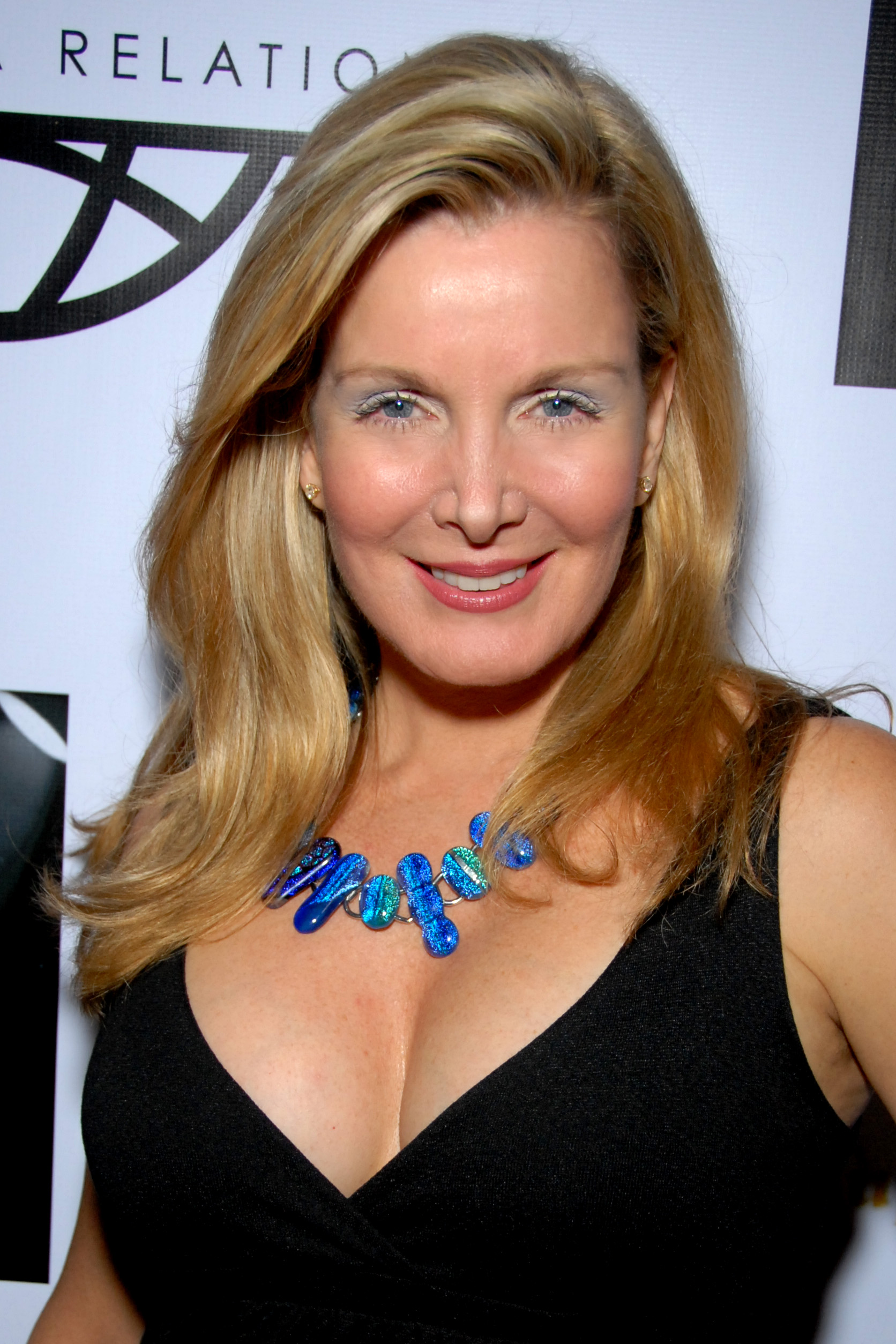
- Blake in 2009
- Occupations: Actress, Pet lifestyle expert
- Website: www.meganblake.com

Megan Blake is a pet lifestyle expert and an actress based on Malibu, California. She was crowned Miss Georgia in 1983.

== Career ==
Blake is a host, writer, and producer for Animal Attractions Television. The show's mission is to help people have the best possible relationship with their pets. Blake specializes in training dogs for integration with families and children, teaching the kids to be pack leaders. In working with rescue wolves, Blake has learned pack structure and how to "speak dog.” Having traveled over 100,000 miles with her cat, she is also a trusted pet travel expert in the media.

She is a pet columnist for Dog's Life magazine (also honored by the HSUS and featured on The Bonnie Hunt Show), has been on the covers of, written cover stories for, or been the subject of feature articles in magazines including Cat Fancy, LAX, San Diego Pets, and Atlanta Magazine. She is a requested essayist for the Humane Society of the United States, has her own pet book imprint, and makes television and live appearances to share pet info and host pet events, but, she doesn't "just play an animal lover on TV." Megan has rescued and worked with animals all her life and now has six living with her: two cats, two dogs, and two horses. She found all of them on the street except for the horses whom she rescued from imminent slaughter after one had been made dangerous from abuse. Her cat, Tout Suite The Travel Kitty, guest-stars on Animal Attractions TV, and has traveled over 100,000 miles with her, and has completed a book series chronicling his adventures.

In addition to being a contributing writer/producer for Animal Attractions TV, Blake is an animal spokesperson, serving as a media pet expert, hosting live pet events, like emceeing the Awards Ceremony of the Luxury Pet Pavilion trade show, the Fifi Fashion Shows for the Southern Women's Shows, Paws and Pals, and auctions for pet rescues as well as serving as a celebrity judge for grooming and mutt contests from which many shelter dogs are adopted. Blake uses all Red Carpet opportunities to speak for pets, she is starting a second pet column for LAX magazine after receiving a great response to her feature article, and she gives daily pet tips on The Vegas Entertainment Network. An award-winning published poet, she donates her poetry and artwork to raise money for animal shelters and is a member of the Humane Society of the United States and the ASPCA Guardians.

Blake is a spokesperson for the Big Oaks Wolf Sanctuary, and in working with and learning "wolf" she translates these lessons into better communicating with dogs. She has worked on set with wolves and mountain lions, and participated in endurance races with her Arabian horse, Starfire. She has even served as a film set animal wrangler and trained her dog, Spirit, to act in two films, one in which the pooch played opposite Golden Globe nominee David Carradine and the other in which she, with only three legs, took the stage with dancers from the New York City Ballet.

As an actress, Blake has played in 25-plus feature films alongside some of the biggest names in the business including Academy Award winner Elizabeth Taylor in Sweet Bird of Youth, Golden Globe nominee Christina Ricci and Emmy winner Lisa Kudrow in The Opposite of Sex, Academy Award nominee John C. Reilly and Will Ferrell in Talladega Nights, and Golden Globe nominee David Carradine in The Puzzle In The Air, and she has appeared on more than 20 award winning television series. Her most recent projects include a sci-fi thriller entitled Eyeborgs, where Blake saves the world opposite Highlander star Adrian Paul and an animated film, The Magistical, which won at the Hollywood Film Festival and in which she voices the central character, a little boy.

Blake sits on the board of directors of the Greensboro Ballet in North Carolina, is a magna cum laude graduate of Georgia Tech where she was a member of Alpha Xi Delta, was the speech writer for the Governor of Georgia, is a guest speaker at universities including the University of Richmond Law School in Richmond, VA and the University of North Carolina, and is a former Miss Georgia. She is married to her manager, Kim H. Swartz.

Preceded by Bobbie Eakes	Miss Georgia; 1983	Succeeded by Camille Bentley

== Filmography ==
=== Films ===
Year	Film	Role
1985	Invasion U.S.A.	Girlfriend
1988	Pass the Ammo	Cherry
1988	Mortuary Academy	Tammy
1988	It Takes Two	Megan
1989	Sweet Bird of Youth	Megan
1991	Infinity	Karen
1993	Under Investigation	Carla
1995	Digital Man	Lieutenant Thompson
1998	The Opposite of Sex	Bobette
1999	The Puzzle In The Air	Karen England
1999	P.U.N.K.S.	FBI Agent Houlihan
1999	King Cobra	Grace Stills
2001	Pursuit of Happiness	Minister
2002	The Cross	"Sugar"
2006	Talladega Nights	Megan
2007	Dog Days of Summer	May Walden
2008	The Magistical	Foible, Voice
2008	Lost Stallions: The Journey Home	Rachel Gattison
2009	Eyeborgs	Barbara Hawkins

=== Television ===
Year	Series	Role
1995	Baywatch Nights	Mrs. Van der Kellen
1997	Life with Roger	Sara
1997	Suddenly Susan	Cindy
1997	Step By Step	Ellen Spencer
2003	Dawson's Creek	Dentist
2006–2009	Animal Attractions Television	Host
