= Clare Carey =

American actress (born 1967)

- Born: June 11, 1967 (age 59); Rhodesia
- Occupation: Actress
- Years active: 1987–present
- Spouse: Seth Seaberg
- Children: 2

Clare Carey (born June 11, 1967) is an American film and television actress best known for her roles as Kelly Fox in Coach (1989-1995) and Mary Bailey in Jericho (2006-2008), and her film role in Savannah Sunrise (2016).

== Background ==
Carey was born at a Catholic mission in Rhodesia where her father (a doctor) and mother (a teacher) were serving. She lives in Los Angeles with her husband and two children.

== Career ==
Though she acted in many films, Carey is best known for her recurring roles in episodic television, most notably for her role as Kelly Fox on the American sitcom Coach and her role as Macy Carlson, the Olsen twins' mother on the ABC Family sitcom So Little Time. She has also had recurring roles on Point Pleasant in the role of Sarah Parker, Jericho as bartender Mary Bailey, Crash as Christine Emory and made a guest-star appearance in Eli Stone as a lawyer opposing Eli in court. Carey also did a cameo in the indie film La Cucina, which premiered on Showtime in December 2009. She plays Rachel Hunter's girlfriend.

She also played a part in NCIS episode "Life Before His Eyes" as Ann Gibbs, the mother of Leroy Jethro Gibbs, played by Mark Harmon. Carey later appeared on NCIS' spinoff NCIS: New Orleans, playing militia villainess Anne Boudreau in the episode, "Sic Semper Tyrannis."

== Filmography ==
=== Film ===
Year	Title	Role	Notes
1987	Zombie High	Mary Beth	
1988	Waxwork	Gemma	
1988	Uninvited	Bobbie	Video
2001	Crocodile Dundee in Los Angeles	Skater	
2006	Smokin' Aces	Laverne	
2006	Submission	Samantha Davis	Video
2007	La Cucina	Celia	
2010	Unrequited	Ruth Jacobs	
2010	The Trial	Dr. Anna Wilkes	
2012	True Love	Dana	
2014	Soul Mates	Zoe	
2016	Savannah Sunrise	Angie	

=== Television ===
Year	Title	Role	Notes
1988	Once Upon a Texas Train	Meg Boley	TV film
1988	Mr. Belvedere	Denise	"The Apartment"
1989	The Super Mario Bros. Super Show!	E.C. The Extra Creepy	"E.C. the Extra Creepy"
1989–1995	Coach	Kelly Fox	Main role (seasons 1–7)
1991	Dragnet	Lydia Stephens	"To Steal a Child"
1992	Obsessed	Andie Bledsoe	TV film
1995	Hercules: The Legendary Journeys	Aegina	"The Wrong Path"
1995	Betrayed: A Story of Three Women	Dana Bixler	TV film
1995	Johnny Mnemonic: The Interactive Action Movie	Jane (voice)	Video game
1996	Them	Kelly Black	TV film
1997	Echo	Tess Lewis	TV film
1998	Vengeance Unlimited	Pam Broder	"Bitter End"
1999	Walker, Texas Ranger	Helen	"Suspicious Minds"
1999	The Pretender	Dr. Melissa Blass	"Risqué Business"
2000	The Invisible Man	Vivian Alburn	"Separation Anxiety"
2000	Charmed	Eva	"All Halliwell's Eve"
2001	Ally McBeal	Mary Clapp	"Falling Up"
2001	The Division	Lorna	"What Sharp Teeth You Have"
2001–02	So Little Time	Macy Carlson	Main role
2002	Home Alone 4	Kate McCallister	TV film
2004	Medical Investigation	Lisa Connor	"You're Not Alone", "Coming Home"
2004	Without a Trace	Maureen Grady / Lillian	"Thou Shalt Not..."
2005	Judging Amy	Megan Mulhern	"10,000 Steps"
2005	Stargate SG-1	Kerry Johnson	"Threads"
2005	Cold Case	Rose	"Ravaged"
2005	Weeds	Eileen Dodd	"Higher Education"
2005	ER	Shauna	"Blame It on the Rain"
2005	Night Stalker	Lisa Panero	"Burning Man"
2005	Monk	Sister Heather	"Mr. Monk and the Secret Santa"
2005–06	Point Pleasant	Sarah Parker	Regular role
2006	The Unit	Helene Rouse	"SERE"
2006	Grey's Anatomy	Vicky Gibson	"Where the Boys Are"
2006–2008	Jericho	Mary Bailey	Regular role
2007	The Minor Accomplishments of Jackie Woodman	Meredith	"Straight Up Your Heart"
2007	Shredderman Rules	Mrs. Byrd	TV film
2007	Boston Legal	Deena Rice	"The Chicken and the Leg"
2008	Eli Stone	Sadie Abrams	"I Want Your Sex"
2008	Army Wives	Carol Hudson	"Thicker Than Water"
2008	The Cleaner	Shari Giles	"Pilot"
2008	Flu Bird Horror	Dr. Jacqueline Hale	TV film
2008–09	Crash	Christine Emory	Main role (season 1)
2009	House	Ellie Miller	"House Divided"
2009	Doc West	Denise Stark	TV film
2009	Triggerman	Denise Stark	TV film
2009	NCIS: Los Angeles	Helen McGuire	"Identity"
2010	Criminal Minds	Sheriff Samuels	"Risky Business"
2010	CSI: Miami	Janet Gardner	"Miami, We Have a Problem"
2010	Miami Medical	Arianna	"Man on the Road"
2010	Private Practice	Pam Tanner	"Just Lose It"
2010–11	Chuck	Kathleen McHugh	Guest role (4 episodes)
2011	Castle	Noreen Hixton	"Lucky Stiff"
2011	Rock the House	Jesse	TV film
2011	Harry's Law	Susan Duggin	"Head Games"
2012–2014	NCIS	Ann Gibbs	"Life Before His Eyes", "Honor Thy Father"
2013	Revenge	Patricia Barnes	"Power"
2013	Teachers	Sara	TV film
2013	Major Crimes	Mrs. Riley	"Jailbait"
2014	The Mentalist	Emma Valeria	"Black Hearts"
2014	Perception	Victoria Pavel	"Possession"
2014	CSI: Crime Scene Investigation	Joanna Higgins	"Dead Woods"
2015	NCIS: New Orleans	Anna Boudreau	"Sic Semper Tyrannis"
2015–16	Aquarius	Lucille Gladner	Recurring role
2017	Maid to Order	Natascha	Guest role (4 episodes)
2019	The Magicians	The Foremost Woman	Episode: "All That Hard, Glossy Armor"

== Theatre ==
Year	Production	Role	Venue	Ref(s)
2020	The Curious Incident of the Dog in the Night-Time	Judy Boone	The Theatre Group at SBCC	
