= The Arminian =

Methodist magazine

The Arminian is a Methodist magazine published by the Fundamental Wesleyan Society (formerly known as the Wesleyan Ministers Association), which identifies with the conservative holiness movement. Named after John Wesley's original Arminian Magazine, the present-day Arminian magazine emphasizes Wesleyan, Arminian, and Holiness theology, with implications for what is happening in the world today. It began publication in 1980. Copies of its issues are online.

The original Arminian Magazine was founded by John Wesley in 1778 and was published under that title until 1798. Its title was changed in 1798 and again in 1822. It ceased publication in 1969; the present-day magazine began publication in 1980. The Arminian does not have editorial continuity with Wesleyan Methodist Magazine and is published in the United States.
