= The Trial (2010 film) =

- Directed by: Gary Wheeler; Matthew Modine; Mark Freiburger
- Written by: Mark Freiburger; Gary Wheeler; Robert Whitlow
- Produced by: Gary Wheeler
- Starring: Matthew Modine; Randy Wayne; Bob Gunton; Robert Forster
- Cinematography: Tom Priestley
- Edited by: Jonathan Olive
- Music by: Rob Pottorf
- Distributed by: 20th Century Fox Home Entertainment
- Release date: October 10, 2010
- Running time: 101 minutes
- Country: United States
- Language: English
- Box office: $19,753

The Trial is a 2010 drama film directed by Gary Wheeler and starring Matthew Modine. It is based on the novel of the same name by Robert Whitlow and was released September 10, 2010, grossing $19,753 at the box office.

== Plot ==
Attorney Kent "Mac" McClain, after losing his wife and kids in a car crash, experiences grief of the loss and attempts suicide with a revolver. However, he is interrupted by a phone call inviting him to defend the accused man, instead of the regular public defender, who has a conflict of interest, called the Hightower murder case. He discusses it with Judge Danielson, who encourages him to start living. Mac then talks to Pete Thomason, the supposed murderer of his girlfriend by strangulation. However, Pete does not remember the situation.

Then, seeking guidance, Mac invites two other friends, his neighbor and brother in-law Ray, and a friend Mindy to help him investigate the murder. They both discuss the idea that Pete doesn't remember anything, and try to find evidence that is possibly important to the trial.

Mac discovers Spencer, the uncle was obsessing over the dead girl. It is revealed the defendant and the murdered girl were drugged by hitmen, who then strangled her and planted keys in defendant's pocket. Dr. Newbern was siphoning money from Spencer for years. He killed the niece and had plans to kill Spencer's brother to get control of all of Spencer's money. Greed was the impetus for the killing.

== Cast ==
- Matthew Modine as Mac
- Robert Forster as Ray
- Clare Carey as Dr. Anna Wilkes
- Bob Gunton as Joe Whetstone
- Randy Wayne as Pete Thomason
- Rance Howard as Judge Danielson
- Nikki DeLoach as Mindy
- Burgess Jenkins as Harry
- Larry Bagby as Spencer Hightower

== Production ==
Filming took place in Monroe, North Carolina.
