= The List (2007 film) =

- Theatrical poster
- Directed by: Gary Wheeler
- Written by: Michelle Hoppe-Long; Johnston H. Moore; Gary Wheeler; Robert Whitlow
- Produced by: Robert Whitlow; Kathy Whitlow; Gary Wheeler; Kevin Downes
- Starring: Malcolm McDowell; Chuck Carrington; Hilarie Burton; Will Patton
- Cinematography: Tom Priestley Jr.
- Edited by: Jonathan Olive
- Music by: James Covell
- Distributed by: Level Path Productions; Mountain Top Releasing
- Release date: April 22, 2007
- Running time: 109 minutes
- Country: United States
- Language: English
- Box office: $138,814 (US)

The List is a 2007 American thriller film directed by Gary Wheeler and based on the novel of the same name by Robert Whitlow. The film was shot in Wilmington, North Carolina. It stars Malcolm McDowell, Chuck Carrington, Hilarie Burton and Will Patton. The List was released on April 22, 2007, and grossed $138,814 at the US box office. It was released on DVD by 20th Century Fox in 2008.

According to a reviewer, the film is part of the Southern Gothic genre.

== Plot ==
After the American Civil War (1861–1865), a group of Southern plantation owners form a secret society. Their male heirs are inducted into the society. This continues until the present, when it is decided to kill off a new heir because she is a woman. Another young heir dies as well, and unbelievable things happen to a third and others he cares about.

== Cast ==
- Malcolm McDowell as Desmond Larochette
- Chuck Carrington as Renny Jacobsen
- Hilarie Burton as Jo Johnston
- Will Patton as Harriston
- Pat Hingle as Gus Eicholtz
- Mary Beth Peil as Daisy Stokes
- Elizabeth Omilami as Mama A
- Afemo Omilami as Al Jenkins
- R. Keith Harris as Bart Maxwell
- Steve Ayers as Robert Roget
- Richard Fullerton as Jerrod Weiss
- Richard K. Olsen as Michael Flournoy
- Nicholas Pryor as Harold Smithfield
- Frank Hoyt Taylor as Amos Candler
- Tim Ware as Thomas Layne

== Production ==
Director Gary Wheeler had trouble casting the role of Larochette. As an independent production, his budget was limited, and he had trouble making connections with high profile actors. When actor Tim Ware found Larochette had not been cast, he offered to contact McDowell on behalf of Wheeler. Shooting took place in Wilmington, North Carolina.

== Release ==
The List was released theatrically in 2007 through select states in the South including North Carolina, South Carolina, Georgia, Tennessee, and Virginia. The film would visit a select city for a few weeks beginning in Charlotte on August 12, 2007. It grossed a total of $138,814.

A further releasing campaign was planned for 2008 with intent to spread outside of the South. 20th Century Fox soon set a June 10, 2008, DVD release date.

== Reception ==
Ken Hanke of Mountain Xpress rated it 2.5/5 stars and called it "a slickly produced, low-budget, faith-based thriller that's light on the thrills and heavy on the faith". In rating it 5/10 stars, George Tiller of PopMatters wrote, "So what we wind up with is a muddled bit of Southern Gothic lite that somehow manages to be a pretty enjoyable movie." David Cornelius of DVD Talk rated it 2/5 and criticized the film's transition from drama to supernatural thriller. Cornelius described it as "always just a little too melodramatic, a little too hokey, a little too saccharine".
