= Bob Gunton =

American film, television, and theatre actor (born 1945)

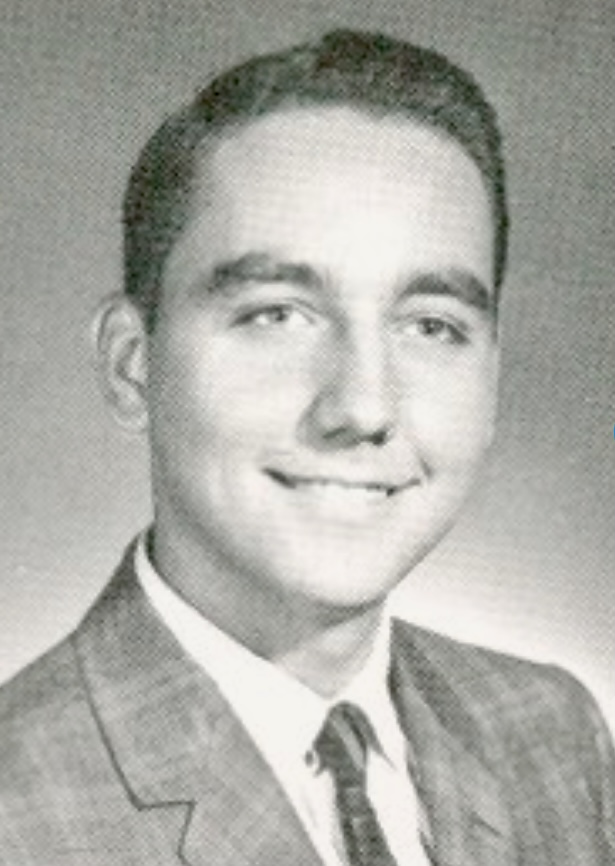
- Gunton in 1963
- Born: Robert Patrick Gunton Jr. November 15, 1945 (age 80); Santa Monica, California, U.S.
- Education: University of California, Irvine (BA)
- Occupation: Actor
- Years active: 1965–present

Robert Patrick Gunton Jr. (born November 15, 1945) is an American character actor of stage and screen. He is known for playing characters including Warden Samuel Norton in the 1994 prison drama The Shawshank Redemption, Chief George Earle in 1993's Demolition Man, Dr. Walcott, the domineering dean of Virginia Medical School in Patch Adams, and Secretary of State Cyrus Vance in Argo. He also played Leland Owlsley in the Daredevil television series, Secretary of Defense Ethan Kanin in 24, and Noah Taylor in Desperate Housewives.

In addition to his film and television careers, Gunton is a prolific theatre actor. He originated the role of Juan Perón in the Broadway premiere of Evita and the titular character in the 1989 revival of Sweeney Todd: The Demon Barber of Fleet Street, roles for which he received Tony Award nominations. He has received a Drama Desk Award, an Obie Award, and a Clarence Derwent Award.

== Early life, education, and the Vietnam War ==
Gunton was born in Santa Monica, California, the son of Rose Marie (née Banouetz) and Robert Patrick Gunton Sr., a labor union executive. A lifelong devout Catholic, Gunton initially planned to be a priest. He attended Mater Dei High School in Santa Ana, California, and the Paulist Seminary St Peter's College, in Baltimore, Maryland, before graduating from the University of California, Irvine in 1968 with Bachelor of Arts degree in drama.

Gunton then served in the United States Army (1969–71) as a radio telephone operator with the 2nd Battalion, 501st Infantry Regiment of the 101st Airborne Division, and was at the Battle of Fire Support Base Ripcord, South Vietnam, during the 23-day siege. He and a comrade were awarded the Bronze Star for returning to the base to retrieve important but forgotten radios in the evacuation's final moments, so that they would not fall into the hands of the People's Army of Vietnam forces about to capture the base. Due to this, he was one of the last people to evacuate. During the battle, he lost one of his dog tags, but it was returned to him over 40 years later in 2018.

== Career ==
In 1977, Gunton was the standby for Christopher Lloyd in the first Broadway - transferred from off-Broadway - production of the Brecht/Weill musical Happy End. After Lloyd sustained a leg injury, it was Gunton who performed on the show's opening night. (Lloyd played the rest of the run on crutches.) Gunton was cast as Juan Perón in the original 1980 Broadway production of Evita, earning a nomination for Tony Award for Best Featured Actor in a Musical. He had a supporting role in the 1985 HBO film Finnegan Begin Again starring Robert Preston and Mary Tyler Moore. Gunton later starred in the title role of a 1989 Broadway revival of Sweeney Todd and received a second Tony Award nomination for his portrayal. Additional theatre credits include Working, King of Hearts, The Music Man (NYCO), How I Got That Story, and Big River.

Gunton portrayed President Richard Nixon in a recreation of the Watergate tapes incident for Nightline. Gunton is also known for his guest starring role as Capt. Benjamin Maxwell in the 1991 Star Trek: The Next Generation episode "The Wounded". Gunton played Warden Samuel Norton, the head of Shawshank State Prison and the primary antagonist in The Shawshank Redemption (1994) opposite Tim Robbins. He also played President Woodrow Wilson in the film Iron Jawed Angels (2004). Gunton played Cecil Dobbs in the 2011 film The Lincoln Lawyer.

Gunton also guest starred in the first season of Desperate Housewives and the sixth season of 24, where he portrayed United States Secretary of Defense Ethan Kanin. He signed on as series regular afterward and reprised the role of Kanin but now as the Chief of Staff to the new president, Allison Taylor, in the show's seventh season as well as the two-hour television prequel film, 24: Redemption. He returned again for the eighth season but this time as the President's Secretary of State. Gunton portrays Leland Owlsley in the 2015 TV series Daredevil. Gunton made a guest appearance on Law & Order: Special Victims Unit in January 2017. In 2021, Gunton was used as a body double for Harold Ramis' character Egon Spengler in Ghostbusters: Afterlife.

== Stage credits ==
Year	Title	Role	Notes
1965	Tennessee, U.S.A.	Johnny Timberlake	
1972	The Kid	Cowpoke	
1975	Oklahoma!	Curly	
1977	Happy End	Ben Owens / Bill Cracker (understudy)	
1978	Working	Bud Jonas / Frank Decker	
1978	King of Hearts	Raoul	Nominated - Drama Desk Award for Outstanding Featured Actor in a Musical
1979	Tip-Toes	Rollo Metcalf	
1979–83	Evita	President Juan Perón	Drama Desk Award for Outstanding Featured Actor in a Musical; Nominated - Tony Award for Best Featured Actor in a Musical
1980	How I Got That Story	The Historical Event	Clarence Derwent Award for Most Promising Male Performer; Obie Award for Distinguished Performance by an Actor; Nominated - Drama Desk Award for Outstanding Actor in a Play
1981	Isn't It Romantic?	Paul Stuart	
1982	The Death of Von Richtofen as Witnessed From Earth	Hermann Göring	
1982	Hamlet	King Claudius	
1983	Passion Play	James	
1983	An American Comedy	George Reilly	
1984	Amadeus	Antonio Salieri	
1985–87	Big River	The King	Nominated - Drama Desk Award for Outstanding Featured Actor in a Musical
1987	Roza	Lola	
1988	The Music Man	Harold Hill	New York City Opera
1988	Phaedra Britannica	Governor	
1989–90	Sweeney Todd: The Demon Barber of Fleet Street	Sweeney Todd	Nominated - Tony Award for Best Actor in a Musical; Nominated - Drama Desk Award for Outstanding Actor in a Musical; Nominated - Outer Critics Circle Award for Outstanding Actor in a Musical
2000	The Poison Tree	The Hon. Ronald S. Rogers	
2002	Follies	Benjamin Stone	
2003	On the Twentieth Century	Oscar Jaffee	
2004	The Great Ostrovsky	David Ostrovsky	Nominated - Barrymore Award for Excellence in Theater

== Filmography ==
=== Film ===
Year	Title	Role	Notes
1981	Rollover	Sal Naftari	
1985	Static	Frank	
1987	Matewan	C.E. Lively	
1987	The Pick-up Artist	Fernando Portacarrero	
1989	Cookie	Richie Segretto	
1989	Glory	General Charles Harker	
1989	Born on the Fourth of July	Doctor	
1990	Sesame Street Home Video Visits the Firehouse	Chief Kirby	Short
1991	JFK	TV Newsman	
1991	Missing Pieces	Mr. Gabor	
1992	Patriot Games	Interviewer	
1992	The Public Eye	Older Agent	
1992	Jennifer 8	Director Goodridge	
1993	Father Hood	Lazzaro	
1993	Demolition Man	Chief George Earle	
1994	The Shawshank Redemption	Warden Sam Norton	
1995	Dolores Claiborne	Mr. Pease	
1995	Ace Ventura: When Nature Calls	Burton Quinn	
1996	Broken Arrow	Mr. Pritchett	
1996	The Glimmer Man	Frank Deverell	
1997	A Thousand Acres	Judge	Uncredited
1997	Midnight in the Garden of Good and Evil	Finley Largent	Uncredited
1997	Buffalo Soldiers	Col. Benjamin Grierson	
1998	Patch Adams	Dean Walcott	
1999	Bats	Dr. Alexander McCabe	
2000	The Perfect Storm	Alexander McAnally III	
2001	Scenes of the Crime	Steven, Jimmy's Partner	
2002	Boat Trip	Boat Captain	
2003	Dallas 362	Joe	
2004	I Heart Huckabees	Mr. Silver	
2006	Believe in Me	Hugh Moreland	
2007	Dead Silence	Edward Ashen	
2007	Fracture	Judge Gardner	
2007	Numb	Dr. Townsend	
2007	Rendition	Lars Whitman	
2008	Player 5150	Nick Villa	
2008	The Lazarus Project	Father Ezra	
2008	The Least of These	Father Thomas Peters	
2009	Tenure	William Thurber	
2010	The Trial	Joe Whetstone	
2011	The Lincoln Lawyer	Cecil Dobbs	
2011	Kill the Irishman	Jerry Merke	
2012	Get the Gringo	Thomas Kaufmann	
2012	Argo	Secretary of State Cyrus Vance	Hollywood Film Awards for Best Ensemble Cast
2012	Trouble with the Curve	Watson	
2013	Highland Park	Bert	
2013	Decoding Annie Parker	Dr. Benton	
2013	Jimmy	Sheriff Brinson	
2013	Runner Runner	Dean Alex Monroe	
2013	Live at the Foxes Den	Tony O'Hara	
2014	Mountain Top	Mr Forest	
2015	Larry Gaye: Renegade Male Flight Attendant	Flight School Instructor	
2015	The 33	President Sebastián Piñera	
2017	Alex & the List	Mr. Stern	
2018	Unbroken: Path to Redemption	Major Zeigler	
2021	Ghostbusters: Afterlife	Egon Spengler	Motion capture role, with Harold Ramis' likeness superimposed
2024	The Inheritance	Charles Abernathy	

=== Television ===
Year	Title	Role	Notes
1985	Finnegan Begin Again	Christian Jamison	Television film
1985	The Equalizer	Cronin	Episode: "Mama's Boy"
1988	Hothouse	Dr. Leonard Schrader	7 episodes
1988	Miami Vice	Rivas	Episode: "Heart of Night"
1989	Unconquered	Governor George Wallace	Television film
1990	Judgment	Monsignor Beauvais	Television film
1990	The Bride in Black	Sydney	Television film
1990	Law & Order	Gil Himes	Episode: "Happily Ever After"
1990	L.A. Law	Bob Westin	Episode: "New Kidney on the Block"
1991	Star Trek: The Next Generation	Captain Benjamin Maxwell	Episode: "The Wounded"
1991	Perry Mason: The Case of the Glass Coffin	Assistant District Attorney Scott Willard	Television film
1991	A Woman Named Jackie	Hugh Auchincloss	3 episodes
1992	Ned Blessing: The True Story of My Life	Texas Preacher	Television film
1992	Sinatra	Tommy Dorsey	2 episodes
1992	Dead Ahead: The Exxon Valdez Disaster	Larry Dietrick, State of Alaska	Television film
1993	Wild Palms	Dr. Tobias Schenkl	5 episodes
1993	Murder in the Heartland	Governor Anderson	2 episodes
1994	Roswell	Frank Joyce	Television film
1994	Cosmic Slop	President Ellis (Space Traders segment)	Television film
1995	In Pursuit of Honor	Colonel John Hardesty	Television film
1995	Kingfish: A Story of Huey P. Long	Franklin D. Roosevelt	Television film
1995	Courthouse	Judge Homer Conklin	11 episodes
1996	The Siege at Ruby Ridge	Bo Gritz	Television film
1997	Elvis Meets Nixon	President Richard Nixon	Television film
1997	Buffalo Soldiers	Colonel Benjamin Grierson	Television film
1998	Nothing Sacred	Bishop Corey	Episode: "Signs and Words"
1998	The Outer Limits	Clute Nichols	Episode: "The Hunt"
1998	Ally McBeal	Michaelson	Episode: "These Are the Days"
2000	Running Mates	Terrence Randall	Television film
2000	Family Law	Judge Mason	Episode: "Telling Lies, Conclusion"
2001	When Billie Beat Bobby	Jerry Perenchio	Television film
2001	61*	Dan Topping	Television film
2002	The Court	Casey	Episode: "Back in the Bottle"
2002	Spin City	Governor Riley	Episode: "A Friend in Need"
2002	Touched by an Angel	Sidney Alcott	Episode: "A Feather on the Breath of God"
2002–2004	Greg the Bunny	Jack 'Junction Jack' Mars	Main role; 13 episodes
2003	Mister Sterling	California Governor Marino	4 episodes
2003	CSI: Crime Scene Investigation	Director Robert Carvallo	Episode: "Play with Fire"
2003	Peacemakers	Mayor Malcolm Smith	Main role; 9 episodes
2003–2004	Judging Amy	Dr. Alan Foster	3 episodes
2004	Iron Jawed Angels	President Woodrow Wilson	Television film
2004	Judas	High Priest Caiaphas	Television film
2004	Monk	Dwight Ellison	Episode: "Mr. Monk and the Game Show"
2004–2006	Desperate Housewives	Noah Taylor	Recurring role; 10 episodes
2005	Nip/Tuck	Agent Sagamore	3 episodes
2006	Pepper Dennis	Dick Dinkle	Recurring role; 5 episodes
2006	Numbers	Boyd Resnick	Episode: "Waste Not"
2006	E-Ring	General Hughes	3 episodes
2007	Pandemic	Dr. Max Sorkosky	Miniseries
2007	The Batman	Gorman	Voice, Episode: "Riddler's Revenge"
2007	Women's Murder Club	Arthur Lazar	Episode: "Train In Vain"
2007–2010	24	Ethan Kanin	Main role; 31 episodes
2008	Boston Legal	Attorney William Connolly	Episode: "The Court Supreme"
2008	24: Redemption	Ethan Kanin	Television film
2008	World War II: Behind Closed Doors	President Franklin D. Roosevelt	BBC documentary with historical reconstructions
2010	The Mentalist	Alexander Harrington	Episode: "Red All Over"
2010	Warren the Ape	Unknown	Episode: "Out with the Old"
2010–2016	Royal Pains	General William Collins	Recurring role; 12 episodes
2011	Criminal Minds: Suspect Behavior	Marshall Phelps	Episode: "Strays"
2011	Family Guy	Warden	Voice, Episode: "Cool Hand Peter"
2012	Wilfred	Warner	Episode: "Now"
2012	Up All Night	Tom	Episode: "The Wedding"
2014	New Girl	Ed	Episode: "Basketsball"
2014	Trophy Wife	Francis Harrison	Episode: "The Wedding: Part Two"
2015	Daredevil	Leland Owlsley	Main cast (season 1); 9 episodes
2015	Gortimer Gibbon's Life on Normal Street	Grandpa	2 episodes
2016	The Last Tycoon	Vanderbilt Riddle	Episode: "Pilot"
2017	Law & Order: Special Victims Unit	Lawrence Hendricks Sr.	Episode: "Decline and Fall"
2017	Trial & Error	Jeremiah Jefferson Davis	6 episodes
2018	The Blacklist	Nicholas Moore	2 episodes
2019	The Cool Kids	Colonel Christianson	Episode: "Funeral Crashers"
2019	Project Blue Book	President Harry S. Truman	Episode: "The Washington Merry-Go Round"
2019	Elementary	Frederick Wentz	Episode: "Reichenbach Falls"
