= Javier Carrasquillo =

Puerto Rican politician

Mayor of Cidra
- In office January 14, 2013 – January 14, 2021
- Preceded by: Ángel L. Malavé Zayas
- Succeeded by: David Concepción González

Personal details
- Born: September 20, 1964 (age 61) Cidra, Puerto Rico
- Party: New Progressive Party of Puerto Rico
- Spouse: Beverly Rivera Haddock
- Education: Interamerican University of Puerto Rico (BCJ)

Military service
- Allegiance: United States of America
- Branch/service: United States Army
- Years of service: 1982 - 1985

Javier Carrasquillo Cruz (born September 20, 1964) is a Puerto Rican politician and former mayor of Cidra. He earned a BA in criminal justice from the Interamerican University of Puerto Rico. Carrasquillo is affiliated with the New Progressive Party (PNP) and served as mayor from 2013 to 2021. After losing his seat in the 2020 elections, Carrasquillo went on to work under elected governor Pedro Pierluisi as Auxiliar Secretary of Government. In February 2022, he was also appointed as President of the Special Communities Perpetual Escrow (Fideicomiso Perpetuo para las Comunidades Especiales), which oversees resources for low income communities in the island.
