= Mark Freiburger =

American filmmaker

- Born: Stephen Mark Freiburger; July 16, 1983 (age 43); Roanoke, Virginia, United States
- Education: UNC School of the Arts
- Occupations: Film Director & Screenwriter

Stephen Mark Freiburger (born July 16, 1983) is an American filmmaker.

== Early life and education ==
- Graduated from the University of North Carolina School of the Arts in 2005.

== Film work ==
- Writer/Director of the feature film Between Borders, set for late January 2025 release in theaters nationwide.
- Co-Writer of the upcoming feature film Arise produced by Sycamore Pictures and Third Coast Content.
- Writer of Birches UK based feature. Based on the novel 'Silver Birches' (published in 2009 by Adrian Plass), was turned into a film starring Natasha Little, Anna Acton and Todd Carty.
- Shadowed Michael Bay in an apprenticeship program on Transformers: Age of Extinction.
- Wrote and produced The Trial, starring Matthew Modine, Bob Gunton and Robert Forster. Released by 20th Century Fox.
- Directed and produced Dog Days of Summer. Feature directorial debut. Released by Sony Pictures Home Entertainment

== Commercial work ==
- Winner of the 2013 Doritos Crash the Super Bowl contest. His commercial Fashionista Daddy made for a mere $300 beat out thousands of other entries, aired during Super Bowl XLVII on February 3, 2013, and was the #1 ranked :30 commercial of the Super Bowl on the USA Today Ad Meter. It landed him a mentorship under director Michael Bay on Transformers: Age of Extinction starring Mark Wahlberg.
- On January 29, 2014, it was announced during a live broadcast on CBS that his Doritos commercial was ranked the Greatest Super Bowl Commercial of All Time on a countdown of the top 10 commercials in Super Bowl history.
- Directed 2 commercials for Join.Me in 2016–2017.
- Directed a PSA featuring Jamie Lee Curtis for The Clare Foundation in 2016.
- Directed an IKEA commercial in South Korea for Spring/Summer 2017 campaign.
- Directed a campaign of national broadcast commercials for Samaritan's Feet in 2017–2018.
- Directed a Microsoft branded film in 2019.
- Directed commercials for Reebok, Fara Coffee, Becker Vineyards, Rodney Vineyards, Accenture and Shiner Bock in 2020–2021.

== Television work ==
- Directed the Cooper & Joey digital pilot for Nickelodeon.
- Directed sketch comedy digital shorts for DreamWorksTV.
- Producer on the 2021 Emmy-Award nominated PBS series Downing of the Flag.

== Theatre work ==
- Directed 110 Stories at Los Angeles' Geffen Playhouse in 2010, which starred Academy Award nominee John Hawkes, Katharine McPhee, Ed Asner, Diane Venora, Malcolm-Jamal Warner, Michael Welch, Nicholas Turturro, Michael Beach and Sharon Lawrence.

== Other work ==
- Directed Season 1 of the narrative podcast series BLACKWOOD, produced by Wondery. Released in October 2018.
