= Gregory Alan Williams =

American actor and author (born 1956)

- Born: June 12, 1956 (age 70); Des Moines, Iowa, U.S.
- Other names: Gregory Alan-Williams; Gregalan Williams; GregAlan Williams
- Occupations: Actor, author
- Years active: 1986–present
- Website
- Military career
- Allegiance: United States
- Branch: United States Marine Corps

Gregory Alan Williams (born June 12, 1956) sometimes credited as Gregalan Williams, is an American actor and author. He is best known for portraying LAPD Officer Garner Ellerbee in Baywatch. From 2011 until 2013, Williams portrayed the role of Coach Pat Purnell in the USA Network series Necessary Roughness. Williams also appeared on the 2015 ABC series Secrets and Lies and then on Greenleaf, and later in 2017's Manhunt: Unabomber, and from 2019 to 2025 The Righteous Gemstones.

== Life and acting career ==
Born in Des Moines, Iowa, Williams graduated from East High School and attended Coe College and served in the United States Marine Corps before pursuing a career in acting. He made his acting debut opposite Steven Seagal in the 1988 film Above the Law. The following year, Williams won the role of Garner Ellerbee in Baywatch. He reprised the role in the 1995 spin-off series Baywatch Nights before returning to Baywatch in 1996.

After leaving the series in 1998, Williams has had recurring guest roles on The Sopranos, The West Wing, The District, The Game, Army Wives, Drop Dead Diva, and Chicago Med. Additionally, he has guest starred in episodes of NYPD Blue, Boston Legal, One Tree Hill, and Meet the Browns and has also lent his voice to the animated series Aqua Teen Hunger Force. From 2009 to 2013, Williams appeared as Judge Warren Libby in the comedy series Drop Dead Diva. Since 2011, Williams has portrayed the role of Coach Pat Purnell in the USA Network drama series Necessary Roughness.

Williams has also had roles in several films, including Remember the Titans (2000), Old School (2003), Be Cool (2005), Dog Days of Summer (2007), Oliver Stone's biopic W. (2008), The Collector (2009), and MacGruber (2010). Williams also serves as the host of the syndicated series Know Your Heritage and Know Your Heritage: Black College Quiz.

In 1992, Williams became the first recipient of the Salem Award for Human Rights and Social Justice (through Voices Against Injustice) due to his heroic efforts during the 1992 Los Angeles race riots in which he rescued an individual who had been pulled out of his car and was being beaten.

== Writing ==
In addition to acting, Williams has authored four books including A Gathering of Heroes: Reflections on Rage and Responsibility: A Memoir of the Los Angeles Riots. The book chronicles Williams' life and experiences with racism, along with an incident during the 1992 Los Angeles riots in which he saved the life of a Japanese-American man who was being beaten by rioters.

== Filmography ==
=== Film ===
Year	Title	Role	Notes
1988	Above the Law	FBI Agent Halloran	
1989	Major League	Bull Pen Guard	
1989	The Package	Colonel Woods	
1993	In the Line of Fire	Secret Service Agent Matt Wilder	
1997	Stag	Taylor Rundgren	
1997	Acts of Betrayal	Francis Morelli	
2000	Remember the Titans	Coach Paul "Doc" Hines	
2003	The Beat	Mr. Bernard	
2003	Old School	Therapist	
2005	A Message from Pops	Pops	Short
2005	Be Cool	Darryl	
2006	The Last Adam	Pastor Bailey	
2006	Dirty Laundry	Percy	
2006	Haunting Villisca	Dolan	
2008	Mutant Vampire Zombies from the 'Hood!	Dr. Reginald Monte	
2009	4 Minutes	Carl	
2009	The Collector	Sheriff	
2010	Preacher's Kid	Bishop King	
2010	Blood Done Sign My Name	Dr. Samuel Proctor	
2010	Good Intentions	Buck	
2010	MacGruber	Minister	
2010	Stomp the Yard: Homecoming	Dr. David Young	
2010	The Confidant	Gambler	
2010	Unrequited	Mr. Williams	
2010	Superman/Batman: Apocalypse	Terrified Longshoreman (voice)	Video
2011	Slice	Captain Kirk	
2011	Slice 2	Captain Kirk	
2013	Jimmy	Coach Sellers	
2013	Heart of the Country	Yates	
2014	The Painter	-	Short
2014	Unspoken Words	Mr. Willy	
2014	Million Dollar Arm	Doug	
2014	Like a Country Song	Reggie	
2014	Hear No Evil	Harold	
2014	The Town Inside	Clyde	
2014	Cat Run 2	Ray Boudreaux	
2014	Roses	Kevin Rodgers	Short
2014	Hero	Kent Redding	
2015	The Sin Seer	Clarence Ricard	
2015	13 Minutes	The Patriot (voice)	Short
2015	Terminator Genisys	Detective Harding	
2015	Adrenaline	Elijah Benjamin Salisbury	
2015	90 Minutes in Heaven	Therapy Doctor - St. Lukes	
2015	Christmas in the Smokies	Bud Walker	
2016	Courting Des Moines	General Stan Hutchinson	
2016	Misconduct	Richard Hill	
2016	Miracles from Heaven	Dr. Joe Hester	
2016	The Accountant	Treasury Secretary	
2016	Billy Lynn's Long Halftime Walk	Raise N' Praise Preacher	
2016	Almost Christmas	Pastor Browning	
2016	Hidden Figures	Marion Smithson	
2016	Bad Girl	Deacon Bacon	
2016	Beat Street	Capt. Tim Weathers	Video
2017	Mountain Top	Lamar Cochran	
2017	Created Equal	Judge Watford	
2017	All Saints	Bishop Thompson	
2017	A Question of Faith	Farnsworth Newman	
2017	Geostorm	General Montgaff	
2017	Slaw	Commissioner Kelly	
2018	God's Not Dead: A Light in Darkness	Reverend Roland Dial	
2018	Legal Action	Ben Wingwright	
2018	Falling in Love Again	Mr. Owens	
2019	I See You	Spitzky	
2019	The World We Make	Thomas Bishop	
2019	Freshman Year	Professor Thompson	
2019	Brightburn	Sheriff Deever	
2020	The Warrant	Tucker Macready	
2020	The Banker	Britton Garrett	
2020	My Brother's Keeper	Pops	
2021	Birdie	Dr. James Cooper	
2021	Karen	Charles Wright	
2021	A Father's Legacy	Robby	
2022	Sons 2 the Grave	Coach Sam Reardon	
2022	County Line: All In	Clifford Mullins	
2022	My Perfect Wedding	James Sinclair	
2022	County Line: No Fear	Clifford Mullins	
2023	Reunion	Willy James	
2023	Puncher's Chance	Charlie Phillips	Short
2023	Christmas Holidate	Nick Harper	
2024	The Disruptors	Steve Russell	
2026	Evil Genius		

=== Television ===
Year	Title	Role	Notes
1986	Jack and Mike	FBI #1	Episode: "Ready or Not"
1989	Howard Beach: Making a Case for Murder	Charlie Brasher	TV movie
1989–1998	Baywatch	Officer Garner Ellerbee	Main cast (season 1 & 3–5), recurring cast (season 2), guest (season 8)
1990	Father Dowling Mysteries	Det. Lt. Adams	Episode: "The Murder Weekend Mystery"
1990–1991	Hunter	Officer Peter Hawkins	Recurring cast (season 7)
1991	The Fresh Prince of Bel-Air	Security Guard	Episode: "Young and the Restless"
1991	Roc	Albert	Episode: "Requiem for a Garbage Man"
1991–1992	Civil Wars	Ed Marsh	Recurring cast (season 1)
1992–1994	Dream On	Anchorman	Guest cast (season 3–5)
1994	L.A. Law	Ellis Cole	Episode: "Silence Is Golden"
1995	University Hospital	Lt. Foster	Episode: "The Right Thing"
1995	Living Single	Darren	Episode: "The Ex-File"
1995	The Parent 'Hood	Coach Vanderpool	Episode: "Track Dreams"
1995–1997	Baywatch Nights	Officer Garner Ellerbee	Main cast (season 1), guest (season 2)
1996	Murder, She Wrote	Lt. Paul Bragg	Episode: "Mrs. Parker's Revenge"
1996	Spider-Man	Additional Voices (voice)	Episode: "Sins of the Fathers Chapter 7: The Man Without Fear"
1996	Project ALF	Police Officer	TV movie
1996	No One Would Tell	Detective Anderson	TV movie
1997	Dying to Belong	Carl Ridgeley	TV movie
1997	The Blues Brothers Animated Series	Loure Lemon / Rasti (voice)	Main cast
1998	Mama Flora's Family	Charlie (1941)	2 episodes
2000	City of Angels	Dr. Nate Ambrose	Recurring cast (season 2)
2000	Freedom Song	Pullman Porter	TV movie
2000–2001	The Sopranos	Reverend James Jr.	Guest (season 2), recurring cast (season 3)
2000–2002	The West Wing	Robbie Mosley	Recurring cast (season 2–3)
2001	Boston Public	Jason Anderson	Recurring cast (season 1)
2001–2003	The District	Clive Rogers	Recurring cast (season 2–4)
2004	The Practice	District Attorney	Episode: "Comings and Goings"
2004	NYPD Blue	Agent Marcus	Episode: "Who's Your Daddy?"
2004	Crossing Jordan	U.S. Army Chaplain	Episode: "Deja Past"
2005	Boston Legal	John Zenawi	Episode: "Schmidt Happens"
2005	Monk	Sorenson	Episode: "Mr. Monk and Mrs. Monk"
2005	Locusts	General Miller	TV movie
2006	One Tree Hill	Chuck	Episode: "All Tomorrow's Parties"
2006	Everwood	James Cleveland	Episode: "Lost and Found"
2006	Squidbillies	Plumber Bubba (voice)	Recurring cast (season 2)
2006–2011	The Game	Dr. James Barnett	Guest (season 1), recurring cast (season 3–4)
2007	Law & Order: Special Victims Unit	Detective Folkner	Episode: "Philadelphia"
2009	Army Wives	Lt. Col. Wallace	Recurring cast (season 3)
2009	Meet the Browns	Charles Walker	Episode: "Meet the Matrimony"
2009–2014	Drop Dead Diva	Judge Warren Libby	Recurring cast
2010	NCIS: Los Angeles	Vendor Phil	Episode: "Burned"
2010	Past Life	Eli Parson	Recurring cast
2010	Christmas Cupid	Larry	TV movie
2011	Castle	Jim Van-Eps	Episode: "Lucky Stiff"
2011	Aqua Teen Hunger Force	Freedom Cobra (voice)	Recurring cast (season 8)
2011, 2020	Tyler Perry's House of Payne	Joffrey Starr	2 episodes
2011–2013	Necessary Roughness	Coach Pat Purnell	Recurring cast
2012	Hornet's Nest	Detective Ron Brewster	TV movie
2012	Somebody's Child	Petey	TV movie
2013	Between Sisters	Franklin	TV movie
2013	Let the Church Say Amen	-	TV movie
2013	Teachers	Robert	TV movie
2013	Marry Me for Christmas	Donald	TV movie
2013	Nashville	Detective Glynn	Episode: "I'll Never Get Out of This World Alive"
2014	My Other Mother	Abner	TV movie
2014	Marry Us for Christmas	Donald	TV movie
2014	Identity	Dr. Art Sloan	TV movie
2014	Reckless	Geoff Tate	Episode: "Blind Sides"
2014	Finding Carter	Captain Moss	Recurring cast (season 1)
2015	Being Mary Jane	Mark's Father	Episode: "Freedom"
2015	Secrets and Lies	Kevin Haynes	Recurring cast (season 1)
2015	Satisfaction	Mike	Episode: "...Through Bondage"
2015	To Hell and Back	Lance	TV movie
2015	A Baby for Christmas	Donald	TV movie
2015–2016	Powers	Waldo Pilgrim	Guest (season 1), recurring cast (season 2)
2015–2016	The Inspectors	Lawrence Downing	Recurring cast (season 1), guest (season 2)
2016	Game of Silence	Aaron Epps	Recurring cast
2016	Containment	Police Chief Myles Besser	Recurring cast
2016	Merry Christmas, Baby	Donald	TV movie
2016–2018	Greenleaf	Robert 'Mac' McCready	Recurring cast (season 1), main cast (season 2), guest (season 3)
2017	Manhunt: Unabomber	Judge Garland Burrell	Episode: "USA vs. Theodore J. Kaczynski"
2017–2025	Chicago Med	Bert Goodwin	Guest (season 2-3 & 6), recurring cast (season 5 & 9)
2018	MacGyver	Julian Halsey	Episode: "Benjamin Franklin + Grey Duffle"
2018	The Resident	Dr. Peterson	Recurring cast (season 1)
2018	Mr. Mercedes	DA Harvey Dunford	Episode: "Nobody Puts Brady in a Crestmore"
2018	Chandler Christmas Getaway	Donald	TV movie
2019	Swamp Thing	Mayor Riley	Episode: "Pilot"
2019–2025	The Righteous Gemstones	Martin Imari	Main cast
2020	Council of Dads	Will Calhoun	Episode: "Heart Medicine"
2021	Saints & Sinners	Victor Thompson	Recurring cast (season 5)
2021	Envy: A Seven Deadly Sins Story	Elijah Wilson	TV movie
2024	Blue Ridge	Miles Mitchell	Episode: "Appalachian Waltz"
2025	Grosse Pointe Garden Society	Catherine's Father	Episode: "Seasons"
2025	Will Trent	Drummond Moncrief	Episode: "Push, Jump, Fall"
2025	9-1-1: Nashville	Station Chief Harold Foster	2 episodes

=== Video games ===
Year	Title	Role	Notes
2009	Avatar: The Game	Dr. Victor Monroe	
2010	Fallout: New Vegas	Additional voices	

== Bibliography ==
- A Gathering of Heroes: Reflections on Rage and Responsibility : A Memoir of the Los Angeles Riots. Academy Chicago Publishers. March 1994. ISBN 0-89733-404-3.
- For Black, Brown, & Beige Baby Girls Born Too Beautiful To Watch The Bay. The Journey Press. 1997. ISBN 1-930629-00-1.
- Boys To Men: Maps For the Journey. Doubleday. 1997. ISBN 0-385-48687-1.
- Heart of a Woman. Enaz Publications. November 25, 2009. ISBN 978-1-59232-229-9.
