= DeLane Matthews =

American actress (born 1961)

- Born: August 7, 1961 (age 65); Rockledge, Florida, United States
- Education: Florida State University
- Occupation: Actress
- Years active: 1983–2012
- Spouse(s): Tyrone Power Jr. (m. 1995; div. 2003) Lennie Loftin (m. 2009)
- Children: 1

DeLane Matthews (born August 7, 1961) is an American actress. She is best known for her role as Beth Barry in the CBS television sitcom Dave's World from 1993 to 1997.

== Life and career ==
DeLane Matthews was raised in northern Florida. She moved to Manhattan after being hired to join the Kennedy Center/Juilliard School Acting Company. Acting in theater productions, she appeared Off-Broadway in City Boys at the Jewish Rep, and Pieces of Eight at The Public Theater. She also performed in The Cradle Will Rock, The Merry Wives of Windsor, and Pericles, and toured in The Bat, Grease and I Oughta Be in Pictures.

=== Television ===
Following daytime television work in Guiding Light in New York City, Matthews transitioned into primetime television on the Peter Boyle ABC comedy series Joe Bash (1986), playing the part of the streetwalker Lorna. It was cancelled after six episodes. In 1988, she went to star with Scott Bakula and Patricia Richardson in the one season of the CBS sitcom Eisenhower and Lutz. She and Richardson both moved on to star on the NBC sitcom FM (1989-1990), along with Robert Hays, and in 1992 landed a leading role on the ABC sitcom Laurie Hill. In 1993, Matthews landed a female leading role opposite Harry Anderson in the CBS sitcom Dave's World; the series ran to 1997. In 1995, Matthews rejoined Bakula in a starring role on the two part miniseries The Invaders; the two had also worked together when she was guest star in the 1992 episode "Roberto!" of his series Quantum Leap.

Matthews guest-starred in a number of television series, including Murphy Brown, From the Earth to the Moon, Diagnosis: Murder, Strong Medicine, Cold Case, Nip/Tuck, Castle and well as recurred on The Shield and Saving Grace. In 2001, she joined the cast of ABC soap opera General Hospital playing Janine Matthews. She was regular cast member from October 29, 2001, to June 5, 2003.
