= County Line (film) =

- Poster
- Directed by: Shea Sizemore
- Written by: Jon Nappa; Shea Sizemore; Jason White
- Produced by: Gary Wheeler
- Starring: Tom Wopat; Patricia Richardson; Jeff Fahey
- Cinematography: Brent Christy
- Production company: INSP Films
- Distributed by: Imagicomm Entertainment
- Release date: May 5, 2018
- Country: United States
- Language: English

County Line is an American action Western film which was released in 2018. The film aired on INSP on May 5, 2018. Two sequels were announced, with County Line: All In airing in 2022.

== Plot ==
County Line follows Alden Rockwell, a former sheriff played by Tom Wopat. The sheriff is left with many unanswered questions when his best friend, Clint Thorne, a fellow sheriff in a neighboring county is gunned down. Jeff Fahey stars as the gunned down Sheriff Thorne.

Following his death an investigation is opened by Grant Goodeve's character, Sheriff Preston. The investigation fails to follow any logical route and ultimately results in the case going cold, with some suggesting Sheriff Preston is turning a blind eye to the murder.

Alden refuses to accept that the death of his friend and fellow sheriff cannot be solved, and takes matters into his own hands.

== Production ==
Filming was on location in Toccoa, Georgia.

== Main cast ==
- Tom Wopat as Alden Rockwell
- Patricia Richardson as Maddie Hall
- Dendrie Taylor as Jordan Thorne
- Lance E. Nichols as Doc Bronson
- R. Keith Harris as Deputy Sloan
- Mark Ashworth as Calvin Killby
- Jeff Fahey as Clint Thorne
- Abbi Butler as Ember Rockwell
- Ric Reitz as Zack Van Zant
- Grant Goodeve as Sheriff Preston
- Danny Vinson as Skooter
- Brian F. Durkin as Crank Prattler

== Sequel & future films ==
In 2021, it was announced that both a sequel and third film were in production. The second installment was released in 2022, with the title County Line: All In. The third film is titled County Line: No Fear. Tom Wopat reprised his leading role as Alden Rockwell in both films.
