= Eisenhower and Lutz =

American sitcom television series

- Genre: Sitcom
- Created by: Allan Burns
- Written by: Cheryl Blythe; Allan Burns; Mark Egan; Gina Goldman; David Nichols; Burt Prelutsky; Dava Savel; Mark Solomon; Dan Wilcox; Shelley Zellman
- Directed by: Peter Baldwin; Allan Burns; Andy Cadiff; Beth Hillshafer; Arlene Sanford; David Steinberg; Dan Wilcox
- Starring: Scott Bakula; DeLane Matthews; Patricia Richardson; Henderson Forsythe
- Opening theme: "Boys Like You" performed by Amanda McBroom
- Composer: Patrick Williams
- Country of origin: United States
- Original language: English
- No. of seasons: 1
- No. of episodes: 13

Production
- Executive producer: Dan Wilcox
- Producers: Gareth Davies; Mark Egan; Mark Soloman; Shelley Zellman
- Running time: 30 minutes
- Production company: MTM Enterprises

Original release
- Network: CBS
- Release: March 14 – June 20, 1988

Eisenhower and Lutz is an American sitcom that aired for thirteen episodes on CBS from March 14 to June 20, 1988.

== Overview ==
The series stars Scott Bakula as Barnett M. "Bud" Lutz Jr., a shiftless ambulance-chasing lawyer. Lutz had trouble getting clients, so his father (Henderson Forsythe) added the name "Eisenhower" to his firm's name to attract clientele.

Creator Allan Burns later used three actors from this series—Matthews, Richardson and Geter—on his 1989 NBC sitcom FM.

== Cast ==
- Scott Bakula as Barnett M. "Bud" Lutz Jr
- Henderson Forsythe as Barnett M. "Big Bud" Lutz
- DeLane Matthews as Megan O'Malley
- Patricia Richardson as Kay "K.K." Dunne
- Leo Geter as Dwayne Spitler
- Rose Portillo as Millie Zamora

== Episodes ==
No.	Title	Directed by	Written by	Original release date	Prod. code
1 2	"The Whiplash Kid Returns"	Allan Burns	Allan Burns	March 14, 1988	7701 7702
Bud Lutz Jr., straight out of law school, sets up his practice at a busy, accident-prone intersection in Palm Springs.
3	"The Hernia Chronicles"	Dan Wilcox	Dan Wilcox	March 21, 1988	7704
Bud Jr. is worried about his father's hernia surgery. Meanwhile, Kay and Megan compare notes about their mutual love interest, Bud Jr.
4	"Take My Ex-wife, Please"	Bethany Rooney	Dava Savel	March 28, 1988	7708
5	"Blast from the Past"	Peter Baldwin	Cheryl Blythe & Allan Burns	April 18, 1988	7703
6	"Bud Junior, Junior: Part 1"	David Steinberg	Mark Egan & Mark Solomon	April 25, 1988	7705
7	"Bud Junior, Junior: Part 2"	Unknown	Mark Egan & Mark Solomon	May 2, 1988	7706
8	"Don't Change a Hair for Me"	Arlene Sanford	Shelley Zellman	May 9, 1988	7707
9	"Petrified Forrest"	Dan Wilcox	Burt Prelutsky	May 16, 1988	7713
10	"Bud's Buddy"	Peter Baldwin	David Nichols	May 30, 1988	7710
11	"Pride and Prejudice"	Peter Baldwin	Gina Goldman	June 5, 1988	7712
Bud takes on a racial prejudice case. Meanwhile, Megan breaks up with Bud because his pride is getting in the way of their relationship, and an older woman has eyes for Bud.
12	"Play It Again, Bud"	Andy Cadiff	Mark Egan & Mark Solomon & Shelley Zellman	June 13, 1988	7714
13	"The Devil Wears a Toupee"	Peter Baldwin	Shelley Zellman	June 20, 1988	7711
