= Henderson Forsythe =

American actor (1917–2006)

- Born: September 11, 1917; Macon, Missouri, U.S.
- Died: April 17, 2006 (aged 88); Williamsburg, Virginia, U.S.
- Occupation: Actor
- Years active: 1950; 1957–1999
- Spouse: Dorothea Maria Carlson (1942-2006)
- Awards: Hollywood Walk of Fame; 6338 Hollywood Boulevard

Henderson Forsythe (September 11, 1917 – April 17, 2006) was an American actor. Forsythe was known for his role as Dr. David Stewart on the soap opera As the World Turns, a role he played for over 30 years (1960-1991), and for his work on the New York stage.

== Early life ==
Forsythe was born in Macon, Missouri, the son of Mary Katherine (née Henderson) and Cecil Proctor Forsythe. He grew up in Monroe City, Missouri where he first studied theatre. He transferred from Culver Stockton College to The University of Iowa in 1938.

While attending Culver-Stockton College, he was an active member of Mu Theta Nu Fraternity.

== Career ==
=== Theatre ===
In 1979, Forsythe won the Tony Award for Best Featured Actor (Musical) for his work in The Best Little Whorehouse in Texas. He also appeared onstage in dramas such as Who's Afraid of Virginia Woolf? by Edward Albee, where he was in the original production taking over the role of George originated by Arthur Hill, and The Birthday Party by Harold Pinter. He also appeared as Andrew Jorgensen in the off-broadway play Other People's Money. He was first to perform as the Auditor in Samuel Beckett's Not I, opposite Jessica Tandy.

=== Television and film ===
His television credits included a recurring role as Big Bud on the television series Eight is Enough, which he reprised for another television series starring Scott Bakula called Eisenhower and Lutz. He appeared in many movies, such as Silkwood and Chances Are. In 1965, he briefly carried his As the World Turns character, Dr. David Stewart, over to the prime time soap Our Private World. Other soap operas on which he appeared are From These Roots and The Edge of Night.

== Personal life and death ==
Forsythe married actress Dorothea Maria Carlson on May 26, 1942 (d. November, 2010). They had two sons, Eric, a professor at The University of Iowa and Jason, a writer. He died of undisclosed causes, aged 88, at Williamsburg Landing in Williamsburg, Virginia.

== Filmography ==
Year	Title	Role	Notes
1974	Deathdream	Doc Allman	
1977	The Private Files of J. Edgar Hoover	Suydam	
1978	The Greek Tycoon	Stoneham	
1978	Interiors	Judge Bartel	
1979	Night-Flowers	John Flynn	
1983	Silkwood	Quincy Bissell	
1987	End of the Line	Thomas Clinton	
1989	Chances Are	Ben Bradlee	
1991	The Cabinet of Dr. Ramirez	Senior Member	
1998	Species II	Pentagon Personnel	
