= Unabomber: The True Story =

1996 American made-for-television biographical film

- Genre: Crime; Drama; History
- Written by: John McGreevey
- Directed by: Jon Purdy
- Starring: Robert Hays; Dean Stockwell; Tobin Bell; Victoria Mallory
- Music by: David Wurst; Eric Wurst
- Country of origin: United States
- Original language: English

Production
- Executive producers: Steve White; Megan Callaway
- Producers: Frank Fischer; Nonny de la Peña
- Production locations: Park City, Utah; Salt Lake City, Utah
- Cinematography: Robert Steadman
- Editor: Eric Jenkins
- Running time: 97 minutes
- Production company: Atlantis Releasing

Original release
- Network: USA Network
- Release: September 11, 1996

Unabomber: The True Story is a 1996 American made-for-television biographical film directed by Jon Purdy and starring Tobin Bell as Ted Kaczynski, who is also known as the Unabomber.

== Cast ==
- Robert Hays as David Kaczynski
- Dean Stockwell as Ben Jeffries
- Tobin Bell as Ted Kaczynski
- Victoria Mallory as Linda Kaczynski

== Reception ==
Maj Canton of Radio Times gave the film two stars out of five.
