= Beautiful Wave =

- DVD cover
- Directed by: David Mueller
- Screenplay by: Lynn Salt; David Mueller; John Harris
- Story by: Lynn Salt; David Mueller
- Produced by: Stuart Cameron; Laura Shapiro
- Starring: Aimee Teegarden; Patricia Richardson; Ben Milliken; Alicia Ziegler; David Thomas Jenkins; Helen Slater; Lance Henriksen
- Cinematography: Kev Robertson
- Edited by: Randy Redroad; Josh Beal
- Music by: Edward White
- Production companies: Portfolio Films America, Inc.
- Distributed by: Anchor Bay Entertainment
- Release date: May 8, 2012
- Running time: 96 minutes
- Country: United States
- Language: English

Beautiful Wave is a 2012 adventure coming-of-age drama film. The film was directed by David Mueller.

== Plot ==
New Yorker late-teen Nicole (Aimee Teegarden) visits her estranged grandmother (Patricia Richardson) in Santa Cruz, California for the summer. She learns family history, meets a boy, takes a road trip to Mexico, learns to surf, and discovers her missing-or-presumed-dead grandfather.

== Cast ==
- Aimee Teegarden as Nicole Davenport
- Patricia Richardson as Sue Davenport
- Ben Milliken as Jeff
- Alicia Ziegler as Kayla
- David Thomas Jenkins as Danny
- Helen Slater as Jane Davenport
- Lance Henriksen as Jimmy Davenport / Baja Man

Professional surfer Holly Beck surfs in a non-speaking cameo role.
