= Belzebuth (film) =

2017 Mexican horror film

- Film poster
- Directed by: Emilio Portes
- Written by: Emilio Portes; Luis Carlos Fuentes
- Produced by: Rodrigo Herranz
- Starring: Joaquín Cosío; Tobin Bell
- Cinematography: Ramon Orozco
- Edited by: Emilio Portes; Rodrigo Rios
- Music by: Aldo Max Rodriguez
- Production company: Pastorela Peliculas
- Distributed by: Videocine
- Release dates: 14 October 2017 (Sitges); 11 January 2019 (Mexico)
- Running time: 114 minutes
- Country: Mexico
- Languages: English; Spanish
- Budget: $3.6 Million
- Box office: $1,54 Million

Belzebuth is a 2017 Mexican horror film directed by Emilio Portes, starring Joaquín Cosío and Tobin Bell.

== Synopsis ==
The story begins in a hospital with detective Emmanuel Ritter and his wife celebrating the birth of their baby son. When Ritter receives a call from his office, he leaves and a nurse takes the baby to the nursery. Another nurse, who took the next shift, locks the nursery door, takes out a scalpel, and starts to stab Ritter's son and other infants in the nursery. Before anyone can break into the nursery, the nurse has killed all the newborns and slit her own throat.

Many years later, Ritter remains traumatized and emotionally distant, unable to process the death of his son. At work, he learns of a mass shooting at an elementary school. This turns out to be only one of a series of gruesome massacres in the area. Ritter embarks on a paranormal investigation, looking for an excommunicated priest and trying to find the evil force responsible for the shocking incidents.

== Cast ==
- Joaquín Cosío as Emmanuel Ritter
- Tate Ellington as Ivan Franco
- Tobin Bell as Vasilio Canetti
- Giovanna Zacarías as Leonor
- Yunuen Pardo as Beatríz
- Jose Sefami as Demetrio
- Aida López as Elena
- Enoc Leaño as Jefe Najera
- Felipe Tututi as Enzo
- Norma Angélica as Doña Eulalia
- Mercedes Hernández as Aurora Moreno
- Liam Villa as Isa
- Damaris Rubio as Reportera
- Carlos "Conde" Fabregat as Belzebuth

== Reception ==
On the review aggregator website Rotten Tomatoes, 80% of 15 critics' reviews are positive, with an average rating of 6.4/10.
