= The Invaders (miniseries) =

1995 US television miniseries directed by Paul Shapiro

- Genre: Science fiction; Thriller; Supernatural drama
- Written by: James Parriot
- Directed by: Paul Shapiro
- Starring: Scott Bakula; Elizabeth Peña; DeLane Matthews; Richard Thomas; Terence Knox
- Country of origin: United States
- No. of episodes: 2

Production
- Running time: 175 minutes (total)
- Production company: Spelling Television

Original release
- Network: FOX
- Release: November 12 – November 14, 1995

The Invaders (or The New Invaders) is a two-part television miniseries revival based on the 1967-68 original series The Invaders. Directed by Paul Shapiro, the miniseries was first aired in 1995. Scott Bakula starred as Nolan Wood, who discovers the alien conspiracy, and Roy Thinnes appears very briefly as David Vincent, now an old man handing the burden over to Wood.

== Plot ==
Former Air Force officer Nolan Wood, an inmate in prison for manslaughter charges, meets David Vincent (from the original TV series) while both are in prison. Vincent tells Nolan a fantastic story about the alien conspiracy to control the world. Wood begins to have visions about aliens and UFOs.

Later, Wood (Bakula), now a recently released convict, is taken over by aliens. He thinks he is able to throw off their control with the help of nurse Garza (Peña). In fact, the control and Wood's apparent successful resistance and visions are part of a plot by the aliens to kill a Harvard ecologist.

The aliens, which have infiltrated society, plans to cause an ecological disaster to get rid of humanity.

With knowledge of their plot, Wood must save a presidential candidate on a train that is out of control.

== Cast ==
- Scott Bakula as Nolan Wood
- Elizabeth Peña as Ellen Garza
- Richard Thomas as Jerry Thayer
- DeLane Matthews as Amanda Thayer
- Terence Knox as Lt. Coyle
- Raoul Trujillo as Carlos Suarez
- Shannon Kenny as Grace
- Mario Yedidia as Kyle Thayer
- Richard Belzer as Randy Stein
- Roy Thinnes as David Vincent
- Erik King as Doctor Josh Webber
- Debra Jo Rupp as Rita
- Todd Susman as Capt. Johnson
- Jon Cypher as Senator Alex Feinman
- Channon Roe as Rudnik
- Jack Kehler as Monck Patterson
- Jon Polito as Whitley

== Production ==
The premise was used as the basis for a four-hour television miniseries on Fox. The miniseries has been released in some countries on home video, edited into a single movie. The first part aired on November 12, 1995; part 2 aired on November 14, 1995 (both in two-hour time slots).

The miniseries was in essence an extended television pilot, and there were plans for Thinnes to be a recurring character, although Bakula's participation was thought to be limited should it have made it to a series.

== Reception ==
Creature Feature gave the movie 2.5 out of five stars, finding the beginning to be promising but devolving into standard fare.

== Notes ==
In the original broadcast version, the aliens were never shown. They do appear in subsequent airing on SYFY and on the DVD.
