= Eastern Star Home =

Building in Los Angeles, California

- U.S. National Register of Historic Places
- Los Angeles Historic-Cultural Monument
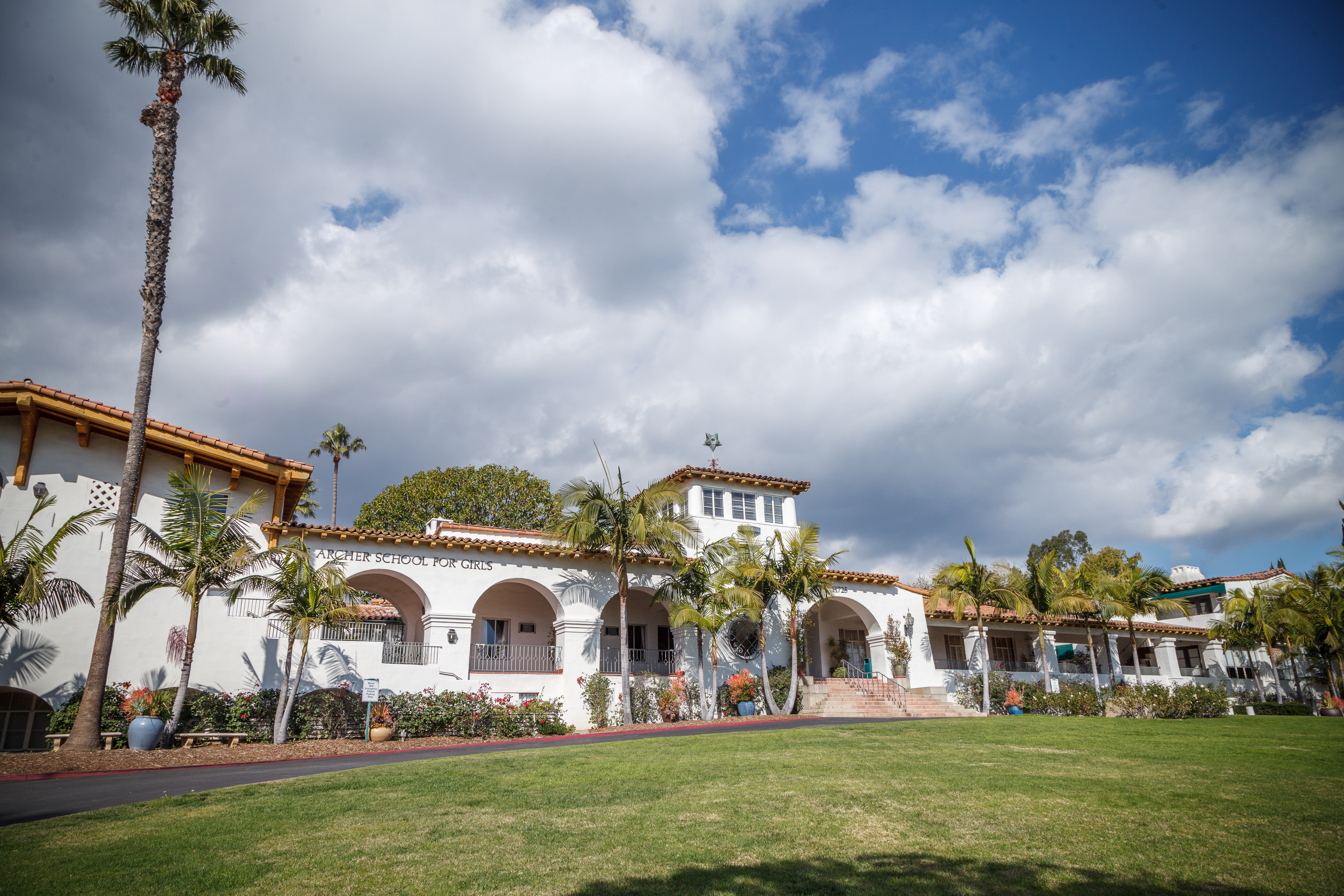

- Location within the Los Angeles metropolitan area Location within California
- Location: 11725 Sunset Blvd. Los Angeles, California
- Coordinates: 34.0646°N 118.4709°W
- Built: 1931-1936
- Architect: William Mooser II, Train & Cressy
- Architectural style: Spanish Colonial Revival
- NRHP reference No.: 100004858
- LAHCM No.: 440

Significant dates
- Added to NRHP: October 9, 2020
- Designated LAHCM: 1989

The Eastern Star Home was a retirement home and convalescent facility in Los Angeles, California, United States. It housed members of the Order of the Eastern Star, Master Masons and their female relatives. Built between 1931 and 1936, the home operated until the late 1990s when membership in the home had decreased precipitously to just 34 residents. "The retirement home moved to a new location, and the Order of the Eastern Star sold the property at Sunset Boulevard to Archer School for Girls."

San Francisco architect William Mooser II, and Train & Cressy, designed the building in the Spanish Colonial Revival style. Sam Rodia, builder of the Watts Towers, claimed to have worked on the construction of the building as a bricklayer. When the cornerstone was laid October 17, 1931, Sunset Boulevard was still known as Beverly Boulevard and the neighborhood was called "Westgate Heights". The original floor plan had 56 singles and nine double rooms, as well as sitting rooms and sun porches on every level.

The Eastern Star Home exhibits the complex, irregular massing; courtyard plan; clay tile hipped and gabled roof; and smooth stucco exterior walls associated with Spanish Colonial Revival style architecture. Though alterations have been made to the Eastern Star Home over time, it retains significant character-defining features on the interior and exterior. It retains integrity of location, design, setting, materials, workmanship, feeling, and association…The primary feature of the central courtyard is the fountain located in the center of an open lawn. The fountain is star-shaped, with a ceramic basin in the center perched on a multi-tiered based. It is sheathed in decorative clay tile produced by Claycraft Potteries.

The original illuminated star was donated by the California Bethels of Job's Daughters in 1935.

The Eastern Star Home was a filming location for the 1974 Roman Polanski film Chinatown.

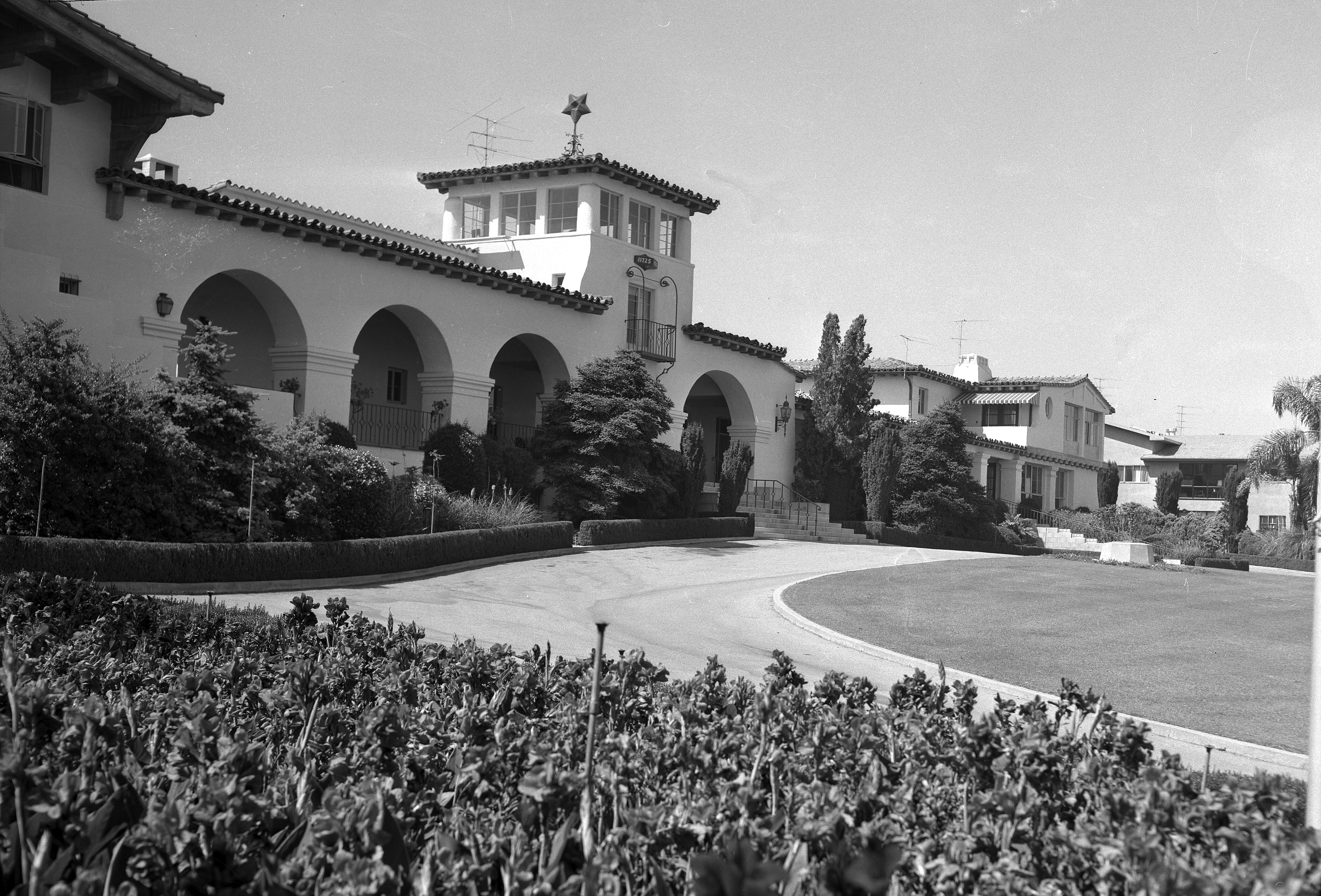
Eastern Star Home photographed by Los Angeles Times, 1956
