= Gates of Darkness =

2019 horror film

- Film poster
- Directed by: Don E. Fauntleroy
- Written by: Lesley-Anne Down; Rob Hickman; Chris Kanik; Randolf Turrow
- Produced by: Don E. Fauntleroy; Rob Hickman; Laurence Lascary; Kenneth Nutley; Bill Reinhardt
- Starring: Tobin Bell
- Cinematography: Don E. Fauntleroy
- Edited by: Bryan Colvin
- Music by: Justin Raines
- Release date: October 2019
- Running time: 91 minutes
- Countries: United States; France
- Languages: English; French

Gates of Darkness is a 2019 American-French horror film directed by Don E. Fauntleroy and starring Tobin Bell.

== Plot ==
A dramatic mystery where a haunted teen endures a terrifying exorcism in the hopes of unlocking shocking secrets about the church and his family.

== Cast ==
- Mary Mouser as Michelle
- Randy Shelly as Stephen Tade
- Tobin Bell as Monsignor Canell
- Adrienne Barbeau as Rosemary
- Alisha Boe as Alexa O'Connor
- John Savage as Joseph
- Brandon Beemer as Father Dumal
- Lesley-Anne Down as Sister Clare
