= County Line: All In =

- Directed by: Shea Sizemore
- Starring: Tom Wopat; Patricia Richardson; Kelsey Crane; Denim Richards
- Cinematography: Brent Christy
- Production company: INSP Films
- Distributed by: Imagicomm Entertainment
- Release date: November 19, 2022
- Country: United States
- Language: English

County Line: All In is an American action film, which aired on the INSP network in November 2022, before it was released exclusively onto streaming platform Vudu in December. Tom Wopat returns as Sheriff Alden Rockwell, in the second film of the County Line trilogy.

== Plot ==
A lawyer widely known for his corrupt activities and representing the worst criminals in the county is found dead. His death occurs on the county line between Maksville County and York County, bringing the two sheriffs into conflict over the case. Alden Rockwell (Tom Wopat) is the Sheriff of Maksville County, with newly appointed Sheriff Joanne Porter (Kelsey Crane) in York County.

The sheriffs have different methods on how the case should be solved, Alden follows his instincts, while Porter takes a more methodical approach. Alden crosses the county line while pursuing a person of interest, bringing their hostilities to a head. Another lawyer turns up dead in mysterious circumstances, the trail taking an unexpected and dangerous turn. Sheriffs Rockwell and Porter must find a way of working together to solve the case.

== Cast ==
- Tom Wopat as Alden Rockwell
- Kelsey Crane as Joanne Porter
- Denim Richards as Dante Hill
- Patricia Richardson as Maddie
- Abbi Butler as Ember Rockwell
- William Shockley as Sam Tate
- Brett Rice as Hugh Jenkins
- Ric Reitz as Zack Van Zant

== Production & release ==
Production on the sequel to County Line was announced in 2021, with filming taking place in Wilmington, North Carolina. Governor Roy Cooper included County Line: All In as part of his announcement recognizing the growing film production industry in the state.

In May 2022, Imagicomm Entertainment released the first official trailer for the film.

The film aired on American television on INSP on November 19, 2022.

== Reception ==
ActionReloaded gave the film a positive review, stating "County Line: All In is a fun movie that has a strong family dynamic." The Dove Foundation, which rates films based on family friendliness, gave the film 4/5 for integrity, but received negative marks for violence & drug-related content.
