= The Archer School for Girls =

Private preparatory school in Los Angeles

Coordinates: 34.064933°N 118.471167°W

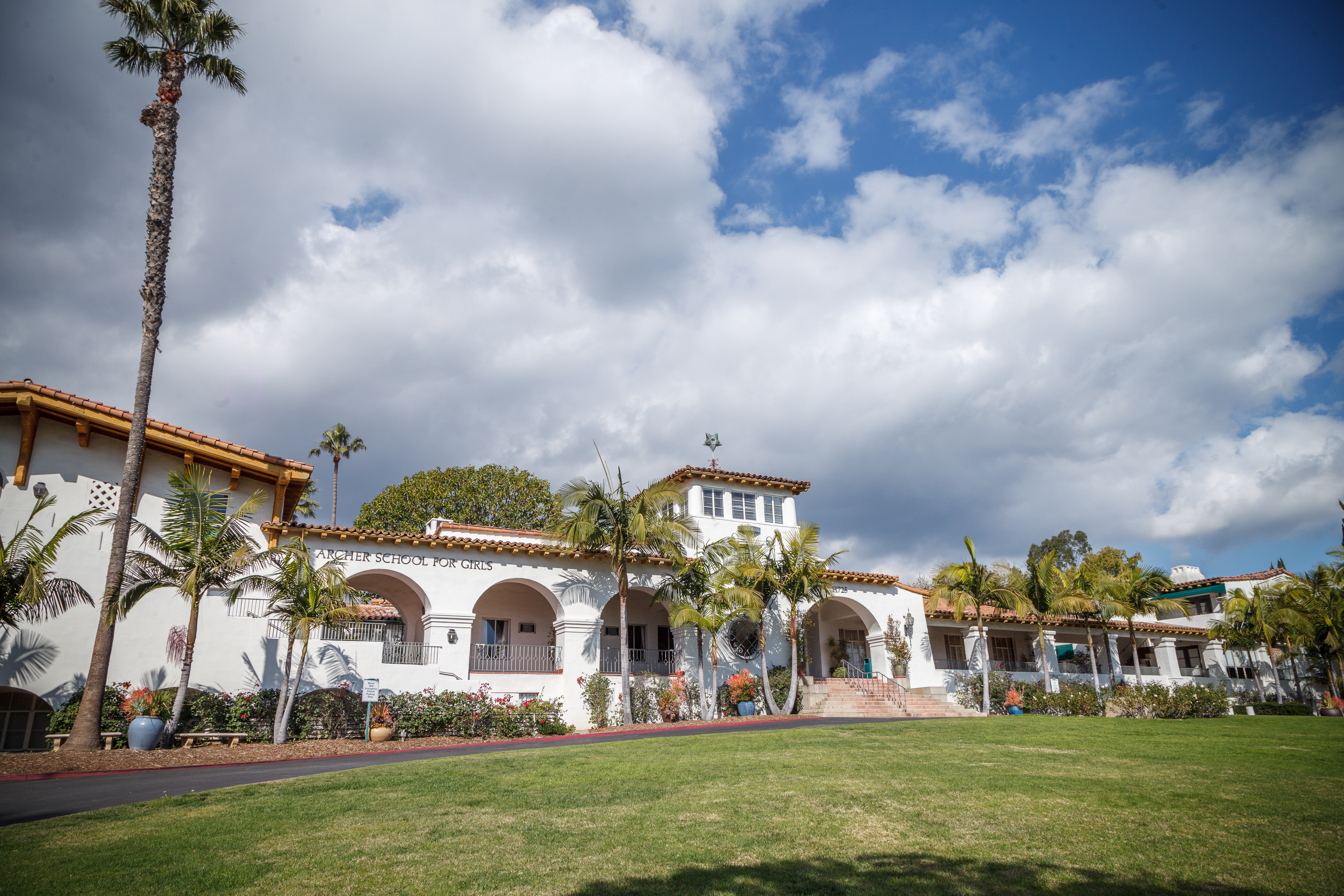
- 11725 Sunset Boulevard; Brentwood, Los Angeles, CA 90049; United States

Information
- Type: Independent
- Motto: "Striking Brilliance"
- Established: 1995; 31 years ago
- Founders: Megan Callaway; Victoria Shorr; Diana Meehan
- Head of school: Elizabeth English
- Faculty: 70
- Grades: 6–12
- Gender: Female
- Enrollment: 500
- Classes: 155
- Average class size: 16
- Student to teacher ratio: 7:1
- Campus: 7 acres (2.8 ha)
- Color
- Athletics: Fall: Volleyball, Tennis, Cross Country, Swimming, Equestrian Winter: Soccer, Basketball, Equestrian Spring: Equestrian, Softball, Swimming, Track and Field, Tennis
- Mascot: The Panther
- Publication: Artemis
- Newspaper: The Oracle
- Tuition: $54,800
- Website: www.archer.org

The Archer School for Girls is a private college preparatory school for girls grades 6–12, located in the Brentwood neighborhood of Los Angeles, California, United States.

== History ==
Archer was founded in 1995 by Megan Callaway, Victoria Shorr, and Diana Meehan, all graduates of girls' schools and parents of daughters about to enter middle school. According to Diana Meehan, the name “Archer” was chosen to signify a place where girls would be taught to be self-sufficient based on research specific to female learners. The school began in a converted Pacific Palisades dance studio with just over 30 sixth and seventh grade students.

In 1999, the school purchased the Eastern Star Home for Women in Brentwood Village, a building designed by California architect William Mooser. The building has been designated a Los Angeles Historic-Cultural Monument and is listed in the California and National Register of Historic Places.

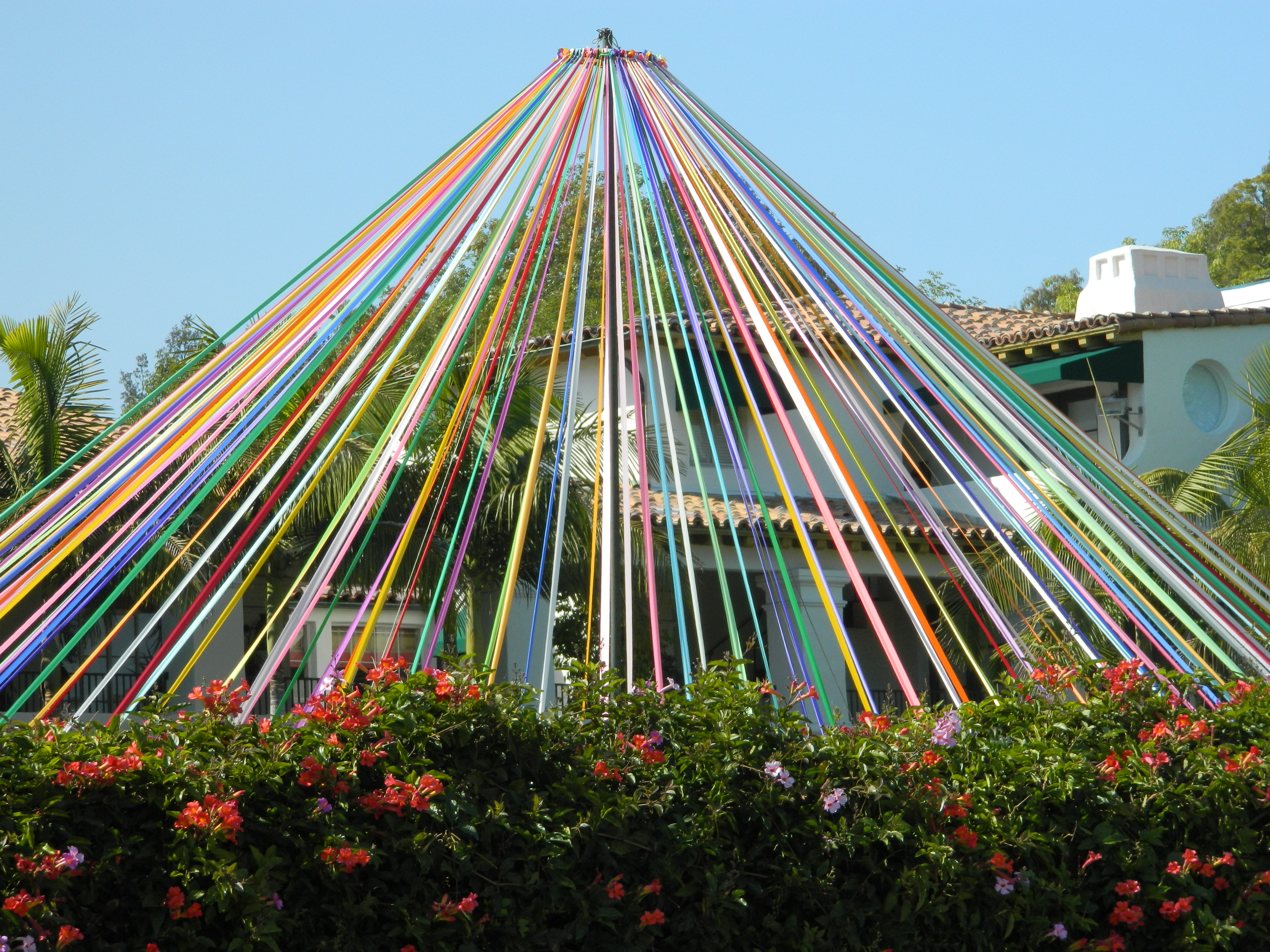
Archer maypole

One of Archer's numerous traditions is the raising of a maypole each year in spring. The tradition began in 1981 when an anonymous donor arranged to have the maypole constructed for the residents of the Eastern Star Home for Women then located at the site. Archer has since continued the custom, with 6th grade students performing a maypole dance on the last day of school.

In 2003, Archer received the LA Conservancy Preservation Award for Adaptive Reuse.

The Archer School for Girls led a panel at the 2022 Teen Vogue Summit in Los Angeles, featuring Head of School Elizabeth English and the chairman and CEO of Universal Music Publishing Group, Jody Gerson.

== Demographics ==
Archer enrolls about 500 students from 79 different zip codes and 141 feeder schools. As of 2026, the school's student population is 0.2% Pacific Islander, 0.4% Native American, 1.4% unknown, 9.2% Hispanic, 9.8% Asian, 10% black, 15.4% multiracial, and 53.6% white.

== Academics ==
In addition to the traditional middle and high school subjects taught, Archer partners with the Online School for Girls to offer additional STEM and language courses to students. In the 2018–2019 year, the school offered 149 courses.

Notable figures who have spoken at Archer include producer and author Oprah Winfrey, actress Kerry Washington, actress and comedian Sarah Silverman, two-time FIFA Women's World Cup champion and two-time Olympic gold medalist Julie Foudy, and journalist Lisa Ling.

In recognition of its support for a free and responsible student press, the school's student publication The Oracle has won the First Amendment Press Freedom Award for the past eight years.

The school's InvenTeam has twice won a grant from Lemelson–MIT, a national leader in efforts to prepare the next generation of inventors and entrepreneurs.

== Sexual assault controversy ==
The passing of California's Assembly Bill 218 temporarily extended the statute of limitations to file childhood sexual abuse claims. During this period, a former student at Archer filed a lawsuit, claiming that beginning in November 2021, she was sexually assaulted repeatedly by an older classmate. Archer's attorneys denied the claims, alleging that the plaintiff was "careless and negligent" and that statute of limitations negated the claims. As the plaintiff was a minor at the time of the suit, the case was settled via judge's review for $300,000.

== Notable alumni ==
- Gracie Abrams, singer-songwriter
- Kate Berlant, comedian and actress
- Molly Burch, singer-songwriter
- Samy Burch, screenwriter
- Carly Chaikin, actress
- Gia Coppola, film director (dropped out)
- Emma Roberts, actress
- Halston Sage, actress
- Harley Quinn Smith, actress
- Amelia Gray Hamlin, model and television personality
- Elizabeth Anne Hanks, writer and journalist
