= Megan Callaway =

American educator and filmmaker

Megan Callaway is a founder of The Archer School for Girls. She is a filmmaker of documentaries and dramas.

== Life ==
She graduated from Vassar College, and received a master's degree in Film from Yale University School of Art where she worked under Michael Roemer.

== Work ==
In 1995, she co-founded The Archer School for Girls. She currently works for a global environmental organization, and serves on the Board of The Pine Ridge Girls’ School.

== Filmography (selected) ==
2008: WWII Behind Closed Doors: Stalin, the Nazis, and the West - Producer US version, BBC/KCET

2005 Auschwitz: Inside the Nazi State, award-winning six-part docudrama series, for BBC KCET/PBS, Producer PBS version

2002 Copenhagen, adaptation of Michael Frayn's play, starring Daniel Craig, Steven Rea, Francesca Annis for BBC, KCET/PBS, producer PBS version, writer/producer Prologue/Epilogue

1996 Talk to Me, made-for-television movie, Co-Producer, ABC

1996 She Cried No, made-for-television movie exploring date rape, Producer, NBC

1996 Unabomber: The True Story Co-Executive Producer, USA Network

1995 The Sister-in-Law, made-for-television movie, writer, USA Network

1986 American Masters-Eugene O'Neill: A Glory of Ghosts, Producer, PBS

1985 Perfect Harmony: The Whiffenpoofs in China, producer/director, Disney Channel
