= Tobin Bell =

American actor (born 1942)

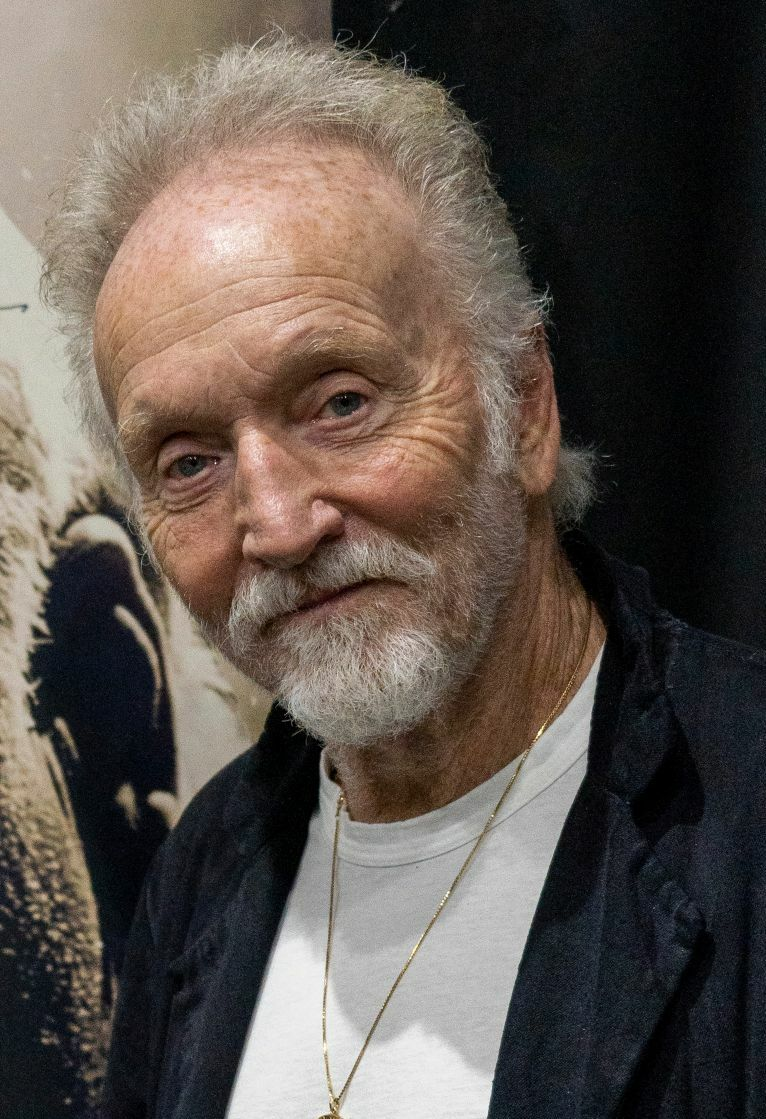
- Bell in 2019
- Born: Joseph Henry Tobin Jr. August 7, 1942 (age 84); New York City, U.S.
- Other name: Joseph Tobin
- Education: Boston University; Montclair State University
- Occupation: Actor
- Years active: 1979–present
- Known for: Saw franchise
- Children: 2

Joseph Henry Tobin Jr. (born August 7, 1942), known professionally as Tobin Bell, is an American actor. Appearing in over 100 titles during a five-decade career, he is most recognized for his role as John Kramer / Jigsaw in the Saw franchise.

Bell started his acting career in the late 1970s and early 1980s doing stand-ins and background work on feature films. He had his first feature film role in Mississippi Burning (1988). Throughout the 1990s and 2000s, Bell appeared in supporting roles in a number of films and television shows, including The Firm (1993), Unabomber: The True Story (1996), Walker, Texas Ranger (1998), The Sopranos (2001), and 24 (2003).

Bell's breakout role came in 2004 when he was cast as the serial killer Jigsaw in Saw (2004). The film was a box office success, and Bell went on to portray the character in eight of the nine sequels: Saw II (2005), Saw III (2006), Saw IV (2007), Saw V (2008), Saw VI (2009), Saw 3D (2010), Jigsaw (2017), and Saw X (2023). The series has become one of the highest-grossing horror franchises of all time and earned Bell recognition as a horror icon.

== Early life and education ==
Joseph Henry Tobin Jr. was born on August 7, 1942, in Queens, New York, and raised in Weymouth, Massachusetts. His English mother, Eileen Julia (née Bell) Tobin, who also had Irish ancestry, was an actress who worked at the Quincy Repertory Company. His American father, Joseph H. Tobin, built and established the radio station WJDA in Quincy, Massachusetts, in 1947 and once ran for mayor of Gloversville, New York. He has one sister and one brother.

Bell studied liberal arts and journalism in college, with the intention of becoming a writer and entering the broadcasting field. He also has an interest in environmental matters, holding a master's degree in environmental science from Montclair State University as well as having worked for the New York Botanical Garden. He credits hearing a seminar by Hume Cronyn and Jessica Tandy at Boston University with inspiring him to begin an acting career. Bell later joined the Actors Studio where he studied with Lee Strasberg and Ellen Burstyn, and joined Sanford Meisner's Neighborhood Playhouse.

== Career ==
=== 1979–2003: Work in background roles, film debut and television appearances ===
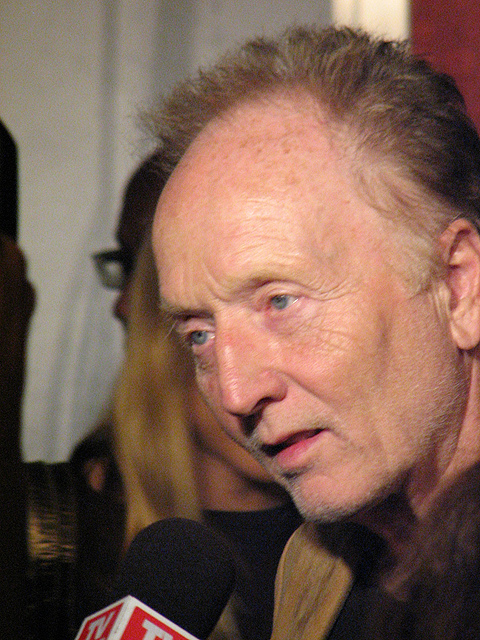
Bell at the premiere of Saw 3D on October 27, 2010

Bell played background roles in the late 1970s and early 1980s in over 30 films, including Woody Allen's Manhattan (1979), while also performing on off-Broadway and off-off-Broadway. Bell said that other actors at the Actors Studio thought doing stand-in and background work was "stupid or degrading", but he believed otherwise. In 1982, he had an uncredited scene in the Sydney Pollack film, Tootsie, playing a waiter at the Russian Tea Room that Pollack used as a tracking shot. He told Movieline, "You know, when you're talking about Tootsie, it's the tip of the iceberg, because those other twenty-nine films I did aren't even on IMDb."

He worked on The Verdict (1982) for two weeks as a courtroom reporter in the trial. He recollected it being a "great opportunity" watching Sidney Lumet and Paul Newman, while also learning the technical aspect of acting. For every role he plays, starting with the initial reading of the script to the final shot of a production, he keeps a journal of various questions about and motivations for his character. "I write all kinds of stream-of-consciousness things that help me." He would have his first speaking role in the 1983 film Svengali playing a waiter with three lines. The same year Bell had a small speaking role as a reporter in the drama Sophie's Choice. In the mid-1980s, Bell said "I was doing off-Broadway plays three nights a week, working on my craft. And a director at the Actors Studio said, 'You know, Tobin, you've been doing that for a while. I think you should go to Hollywood and play bad guys'." Bell moved to Los Angeles and was cast in his first feature film, Mississippi Burning in 1988, as "tough and street smart" FBI agent Stokes.

In 1993, Bell was cast in another Pollack film, The Firm as an assassin called "The Nordic Man". The same year, he played Mendoza in In the Line of Fire, where he attempts to taunt an undercover Clint Eastwood into proving his loyalty by murdering his partner, played by Dylan McDermott. He went on to appear in an episode of the sitcom Seinfeld titled "The Old Man" playing a record store owner. He appeared in two episodes of NYPD Blue playing different characters in 1993 and 1996. In 1994, Bell played a hospital administrator in the second episode of the first season of ER and went on to appear in an episode of another medical drama Chicago Hope, playing a terminally ill inmate on Death Row. That same year, he portrayed Ted Kaczynski in the made-for-television film Unabomber: The True Story. In 1997, Bell guest starred in an episode of La Femme Nikita and Nash Bridges. The following year, he guest starred in an episode of Stargate SG-1 and a two-part episode of Walker, Texas Ranger. Bell made a one-scene appearance in the 2001 episode Army of One of "The Sopranos" playing Major Carl Zwingli. In 2003, he was cast as the villain Peter Kingsley during the second season of 24.

=== 2004–2010: Saw breakthrough role ===
Bell's breakthrough role came in 2004 when he was cast as John Kramer / Jigsaw in the horror film, Saw. The film is about John Kramer, an engineer-turned-serial killer that wants others to appreciate the value of life by placing them in twisted "games" of physical and psychological torture. The film was James Wan's directorial debut and was shot in 18 days on a budget of $1.2 million. Bell spent two weeks lying on a floor and had very few lines, but his role was pivotal to the film. He gives two reasons for joining the film: the opportunity to work with Danny Glover for the first time and thinking very highly of the film's ending. Lionsgate acquired the worldwide distribution rights for the film days before its release at the 2004 Sundance Film Festival. While initially getting a direct-to-video release, test screenings that March turned out positive prompting Lionsgate to release it theatrically that Halloween. It became a box office success, grossing $103 million worldwide. Even though Bell would join the first film with no intention of a second film being made, as a result of the financial success, six direct sequels were released in every October from 2005 to 2010.

The following year, Bell starred in Saw II, which he said was because "the character of John Kramer was not fully defined and he had an opportunity as an actor to take him to the next level". In 2006's Saw III his character was killed off, however he later signed on for up to five sequels. He would return to Saw IV, Saw V, Saw VI and Saw 3D where Jigsaw is featured in flashbacks, some focusing on his origin. He explained, "Saw doesn't happen in a straight line so, you know, in Hollywood everything's possible. It just depends on if you can do it well you can do it. There's a certain thing that we've done in Saw where it's like pieces of a puzzle. It happens out of sync. So that's how it's done." He provided his voice and likeness for the Jigsaw character in the 2009 Saw video game and its 2010 sequel, Saw II: Flesh & Blood.

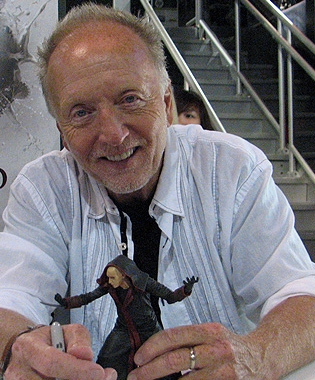
Bell at the 2010 San Diego Comic-Con

For his role as Jigsaw, Bell received MTV Movie Awards nominations in 2006 and 2007 for "Best Villain". He won "Best Butcher" in the Fuse/Fangoria Chainsaw Awards and was given the "Best Villain in a Film Series" title at the 2010 Chiller-Eyegore Awards. The Saw franchise went on to become one of the highest-grossing horror franchises of all time making, as of 2021, over $1 billion worldwide. The character Jigsaw has been labeled a horror icon.

=== 2014–present: Later work and return to the Saw franchise ===
In March 2014, Bell played the antagonist Seth in Victor Salva's horror film Dark House. The following month he was featured in an episode of Criminal Minds, playing a farmer from West Virginia. He appeared in the short film, Unbelief. In the comedy Manson Family Vacation Bell plays a guy who is one of Charlie Manson's followers and lives on his old property in Death Valley. It premiered at South by Southwest in March 2015 to positive reviews with Variety pointing out the "creepy gravitas" with which Bell portrayed the role.

In March 2016, Bell joined the soap opera Days of Our Lives for a five-episode arc playing Yo Ling, who is revealed to be John Black's long lost father. From 2016 and 2017, he guest starred as the voices of the villain Doctor Alchemy and the malicious speed god and main antagonist Savitar on the third season of The Flash, in which he was uncredited throughout the season until his last episode. He reprised his role in the ninth season for its season and series finale "A New World: Part Four". Bell was cast in April 2017 in a short film, My Pretty Pony based on Stephen King's short story My Pretty Pony. In October 2017, seven years after Saw 3D was released and marketed as the final Saw film, Bell reprises his role as Jigsaw in the standalone film Jigsaw. It grossed $103 million worldwide. Bell was also featured in other horror films released in October 2017, including the television film The Sandman, the Mexican film Belzebuth, and Italian film Gates of Darkness.

Bell guest starred in a September 2019 episode of Creepshow, alongside Giancarlo Esposito in the segment "Gray Matter" that is based on King's short story. In May 2021, he played Dr. Lasher in an eight-part found footage fictional podcast series, The Gloom. The series is about a string of unsolved crimes committed by a group of teens in the 1990s while an investigative journalist uncovers a supernatural cover-up that is tied to her past. In March 2023, he played Von in the indie psychological thriller ReBroken. Bell played John Kramer once again in Saw X, released in September 2023. The film received positive reviews, with Bell's performance and his return as a main character being praised by critics. Bell was nominated for the "Best Actor in a Horror Movie" award at the 4th Critics' Choice Super Awards, and "Best Lead Performance" at the Fangoria Chainsaw Awards.

== Personal life ==
Bell has two sons. He has coached a Little League Baseball team and flag football, with other hobbies including hiking and playing guitar.

== Credits ==
=== Film ===
List of films and roles
Year	Title	Role	Notes	Ref.
1979	Manhattan	Man on street	Uncredited	
1981	Tales of Ordinary Madness	Bar patron	Uncredited	
1982	Sophie's Choice	Reporter	Credited as Joseph Tobin	
1982	The Verdict	Courtroom Observer	Uncredited	
1982	Tootsie	Waiter	Uncredited	
1983	Svengali	Waiter	Uncredited	
1985	Turk 182	Sergeant on Bridge	Credited as Joseph Tobin	
1988	Mississippi Burning	Agent Stokes		
1989	An Innocent Man	Zeke		
1990	Loose Cannons	Gerber		
1990	False Identity	Marshal Errickson		
1990	Goodfellas	Parole officer		
1992	Ruby	David Ferrie		
1993	Boiling Point	Roth		
1993	The Firm	The Nordic Man		
1993	In the Line of Fire	Mendoza		
1993	Malice	Earl Leemus		
1995	Serial Killer	William Lucian Morrano		
1995	The Quick and the Dead	Dog Kelly		
1996	Cheyenne	Marshal Toynbee		
1998	Overnight Delivery	John Dwayne Beezly		
1998	Best of the Best 4: Without Warning	Lukasz Slava		
1998	Brown's Requiem	Stan The Man		
1999	The 4th Floor	The locksmith		
2000	The Road to El Dorado	Zaragoza (voice)		
2001	Good Neighbor	Geoffrey Martin	Also known as The Killer Next Door	
2002	Black Mask 2: City of Masks	Moloch		
2003	Power Play	Clemens		
2004	Saw	John Kramer / Jigsaw		
2005	Saw II	John Kramer / Jigsaw		
2006	Saw III	John Kramer / Jigsaw		
2007	Decoys 2: Alien Seduction	Erwin Buckton	Direct to video	
2007	The Haunting Hour: Don't Think About It	The Stranger		
2007	Boogeyman 2	Dr. Mitchell Allen		
2007	Buried Alive	Lester		
2007	Saw IV	John Kramer / Jigsaw		
2008	Saw V	John Kramer / Jigsaw		
2009	Saw VI	John Kramer / Jigsaw		
2010	Saw 3D	John Kramer / Jigsaw		
2014	Dark House	Seth	Also co-producer	
2014	Finders Keepers	Dr. Freeman		
2014	Phantom Halo	Smashmouth		
2015	Manson Family Vacation	Blackbird		
2016	Rainbow Time	Peter		
2017	61: Highway to Hell	The Devil		
2017	12 Feet Deep	McGradey	Originally titled The Deep End	
2017	Belzebuth	Vasilio Canetti		
2017	Jigsaw	John Kramer / Jigsaw		
2019	The Way We Weren't	Jerry	Also producer	
2019	Ice Cream in the Cupboard	Pop		
2019	Gates of Darkness	Monsignor Canell		
2020	The Call	Edward Cranston		
2021	A Father's Legacy	Billy Ford		
2021	Let Us In	Frederick Munch		
2021	Aileen Wuornos: American Boogeywoman	Lewis Fell		
2022	Sleep No More	Smashmouth		
2023	ReBroken	Von		
2023	The Curse of Wolf Mountain	Dr. Avery		
2023	The Cello	Vincent		
2023	Saw X	John Kramer / Jigsaw		
2023	The Curse of the Clown Motel	Mr. Wilson		
2024	Altered Reality	Cooper Mason		
2024	The Bunker	Mr. Riley		

=== Television ===
List of television appearances and roles
Year	Title	Role	Notes	Ref.
1987–1988	The Equalizer	Cronin / Weber	Episode: "Mission: McCall"; credited as Joseph Tobin	
1987–1988	The Equalizer	Deputy Secretary	Episode: "Day of the Covenant"; credited as Joseph Tobin	
1989	Perfect Witness	Dillon	Television film	
1990	Alien Nation	Doctor of Death	Episode: "Crossing the Line"	
1990	Nasty Boys	Finley	Episode: "The Line"	
1990	Jake and the Fatman	Vic Fargo	Episode: "More Than You Know"	
1990	Broken Badges	Martin Valentine	Episode: "Pilot"	
1990	Vendetta: Secrets of a Mafia Bride	Barman	Television miniseries	
1991	Love, Lies and Murder	Al Stutz	Television miniseries	
1991	The 100 Lives of Black Jack Savage	Tony Gianini	Episode: "Pilot"	
1992	Mann & Machine	Richards	Episode: "No Pain, No Gain"	
1992	Calendar Girl, Cop, Killer? The Bambi Bembenek Story	Dan Cushman	Television film	
1992	Silk Stalkings	Emil Rossler	Episode: "Hot Rocks"	
1993	Seinfeld	Ron	Episode: "The Old Man"	
1993	Sex, Love, and Cold Hard Cash	Mansfield	Television film	
1993, 1996	NYPD Blue	Jerry the Artist	Episode: "Personal Foul"	
1993, 1996	NYPD Blue	Donald Selness	Episode: "He's Not Guilty, He's My Brother"	
1994	Deep Red	Warren Rickman	Television film	
1994	Dead Man's Revenge	Bullock	Television film	
1994	ER	Hospital Administrator	Episode: "Day One"	
1994	Mortal Fear	Dr. Alvin Hayes	Television film	
1994	New Eden	Ares	Television film	
1995	Under Suspicion	Ron O'Keefe	Episode: "A Haunting Case"	
1996	The Babysitter's Seduction	Frank O'Keefe	Television film	
1996	The Lazarus Man	Mazzey	Episode: "Among the Dead"	
1996	Murder One	Jerry Albanese	Episode: "Chapter Twenty-Two"	
1996	Unabomber: The True Story	Theodore Kaczynski	Television film	
1996	Chicago Hope	Luther Evans	Episode: "A Time to Kill"	
1997	La Femme Nikita	Bauer	Episode: "Love"	
1997	Nash Bridges	Boyd	Episode: "Payback"	
1998	Stargate SG-1	Omoc	Episode: "Enigma"	
1998	One Hot Summer Night	Vincent 'Coupe' De Ville	Television film; also known as The Trophy Wife's Secret	
1998	Walker, Texas Ranger	Storm	Episodes: "The Wedding: Part 1" and "The Wedding: Part 2"	
1998	Vengeance Unlimited	Teddy Hix	Episode: "Bitter End"	
1999	Strange World	Owen Sassen	Episode: "Eliza"	
1999	The Pretender	Mr. White	Episode: "The World's Changing"	
2000	The X-Files	Ashman / Darryl Weaver	Episode: "Brand X"	
2000	Harsh Realm	Slater	Episode: "Reunion"	
2001	Once and Again	Man in suit	Episode: "Aaron's Getting Better"	
2001	The Sopranos	Major Carl Zwingli	Episode: "Army of One"	
2001	The Guardian	Mr. Pierce	Episode: "The Funnies"	
2001	Alias	SD-6 Agent Karl Dreyer	Episode: "Time Will Tell"/"Mea Culpa"	
2002	Charmed	Orin	Episode: "The Eyes Have It"	
2002	The West Wing	Colonel Whitcomb	Episode: "Process Stories"	
2003	24	Peter Kingsley	Recurring role	
2005	Revelations	Nathan Volk	Television miniseries	
2007	The Kill Point	Alan Beck	Recurring role	
2014	Criminal Minds	Malachi Lee	Episode: "Blood Relations"	
2014	Wilfred	Charles	Episode: "Resistance/Happiness"	
2015	Skin Wars	Himself	Guest judge; Episode: "Emotional Rollercoaster"	
2016	Days of Our Lives	Yo Ling	Recurring role	
2016–2017, 2023	The Flash	Doctor Alchemy / Savitar	Voice role	
2017	The Sandman	Valentine	Television film	
2019	Creepshow	Chief	Episode: "Gray Matter/The House of the Head"	
2020	MacGyver	Leland	Episodes: "Save + The + Dam + World" and "Eclipse + USMC-1856707 + Step Potential + Chain Lock + Ma"	
2026	Helluva Boss	Winston	Episode: "Bad Reputation"	

=== Video games ===
List of video game roles
Year	Title	Role	Notes	Ref.
2009	Saw	John Kramer / Jigsaw	Voice	
2010	Saw II: Flesh & Blood	John Kramer / Jigsaw	Voice	

=== Podcasts ===
List of podcast series roles
Year	Title	Role(s)	Notes	Ref.
2021	The Gloom	Dr. Lasher	8 episodes	
