= The Sandman (2017 film) =

2017 American horror film

- Film poster
- Written by: Peter Sullivan
- Directed by: Peter Sullivan
- Starring: Haylie Duff; Tobin Bell
- Music by: Matthew Janszen
- Country of origin: United States
- Original language: English

Production
- Executive producers: Stan Lee; Barry Barnholtz; Gill Champion; Zelma Kiwi; Jeffrey Schenck
- Cinematography: Eitan Almagor
- Editors: Brian Brinkman; Joshua Toomey
- Running time: 90 minutes
- Production company: Hybrid

Original release
- Release: October 14, 2017

The Sandman is a 2017 American horror television film written and directed by Peter Sullivan and starring Haylie Duff and Tobin Bell. Stan Lee served as an executive producer of the film.

== Plot ==
A little girl with formidable powers imagines into existence the Sandman, a terrible monster from her nightmares that brings harm to anyone who wants to hurt her.

== Cast ==
- Haylie Duff as Claire Blake
- Shaun Sipos as Wyatt
- Shae Smolik as Madison Blake
- Tobin Bell as Valentine
- Ricco Ross as Detective Price
- Amanda Wyss as Dr. Amanda Elliott
- Morgana Ignis as the Sandman

== Reception ==
Dread Central awarded the film two stars out of five.
