= Denim Richards =

American film and television actor

- Richards in 2026
- Born: 1987 or 1988 (age 37–38); Anaheim, California, U.S.
- Occupations: Film and television actor

Denim Richards (born 1987/1988) is an American film and television actor. He is best known for playing Colby Mayfield in the American western drama television series Yellowstone.

== Life and career ==
Richards was born in Anaheim, California. At the age of sixteen, he trained in classical opera, and was a opera singer. He began his screen career in 2007, appearing in the ABC family drama television series Lincoln Heights. In 2009, he appeared in the NBC television talk show The Tonight Show with Conan O'Brien.

Later in his career, from 2018 to 2024, Richards starred as Colby Mayfield in the Paramount Network western drama television series Yellowstone, starring along with Kevin Costner, Luke Grimes, Kelly Reilly, Wes Bentley, Cole Hauser and Kelsey Asbille. He guest-starred in television programs including Good Luck Charlie and Acting Out, and played the recurring role of Elijah Adrieux in the second season of the Freeform drama television series Good Trouble. He played Dante Hill in the films County Line: All In and County Line: No Fear. He also appeared in the film Montford: The Chickasaw Rancher.

In 2025, Richards signed with Innovative Artists Entertainment, "for talent and branding".
