= A Father's Legacy =

A Father’s Legacy
- Directed by: Jason Mac
- Screenplay by: Jason Mac
- Produced by: John Lerchen; Jason Mac
- Starring: Tobin Bell; Jason Mac
- Cinematography: John Carrington
- Music by: Jeffery Alan Jones
- Production companies: Forever Safe Productions; Pond House Productions
- Distributed by: Cinedigm
- Release date: June 17, 2021
- Running time: 87 minutes
- Country: United States
- Language: English

A Father's Legacy is a 2021 American drama film written and directed by Jason Mac and starring Mac and Tobin Bell. It is Mac's feature directorial debut.

== Plot ==
Billy Ford is a solitary widower whose tranquil life is passed in a secluded cabin by a picturesque pond. Billy’s calm routine is suddenly and dramatically interrupted one night when a young man named Nick Wolfe barges into his home wielding a gun and demanding that Billy hide him from the police.

Nick needs a place to lie low after committing armed robbery. He also has to do something about the gunshot wound he sustained while carrying out the crime. Despite his blustering manner, it soon becomes clear that Nick is no hardened felon. Billy tends to his captor’s injury and, as Nick convalesces, the two carry on conversations that become increasingly personal and revelatory.

Nick’s wife, Jean Wolfe, is pregnant. She thinks he’ll be a great dad but, never having known his own father, Nick himself has his doubts. Having hired a private investigator to locate his dad, Nick was driven to larceny to pay the man. Billy becomes a paternal figure to Nick, patiently imparting nuggets of wisdom and calling him son.

Nick learns that Billy has a son, with another woman other than his wife, whom he never met, and has struggled to write a letter explaining his regrets to not being there for his son, and explains why this is the reason he never left his house.

The next morning Billy suffers a heart attack and dies with Nick by his side, explaining to him that Billy would’ve been proud to call him his own son. Nick is approached by a man named Jim who claimed Billy is his father. After asking for forgiveness for his sins, Nick bids farewell to the house to go return the money, fully prepared to be arrested to prove to his son accepting consequences for your own actions. The manager allows Nick to leave without notifying the police. Nick makes up with his wife after learning that he is having a son.

At Billy’s house, Jim reads the letter that Billy left for him, along with an ownership transfer of the house to Jim and explains that he has had always loved him

== Cast ==
- Tobin Bell as Billy Ford
- Jason Mac as Nick Wolfe
- Rebecca Robles as Jean Wolfe
- Michael Aaron Milligan as Bennett
- Gregory Alan Williams as Robby

== Production ==
Filming occurred in Sumter, South Carolina.

== Release ==
The film was released in theaters on June 17, 2021.

== Reception ==
The film has a 71% rating on Rotten Tomatoes based on seven reviews.

Kyle Bain of Film Threat rated the film a 9 out of 10 and wrote, "A Father’s Legacy is heartwarming and eye-opening, and just as importantly, it’s one of the best films I’ve seen in a long time."

Jennifer Green of Common Sense Media awarded the film three stars out of five.
