= ReBroken =

2023 film by Kenny Yates

- Official release poster
- Directed by: Kenny Yates
- Written by: Kipp Tribble
- Story by: Scott Hamm Duenas
- Produced by: Scott Hamm Duenas; Kipp Tribble; Kenny Yates
- Starring: Scott Hamm Duenas; Kipp Tribble; Alison Haislip; Nija Okoro; Tobin Bell
- Cinematography: Nate Stifler
- Edited by: Kipp Tribble
- Music by: Wesley Hughes
- Production companies: Toni Nycole Productions; KAYJ Entertainment; MRP Entertainment
- Distributed by: Gravitas Ventures
- Release date: March 7, 2023
- Running time: 93 minutes
- Country: United States
- Language: English

ReBroken is a 2023 American supernatural thriller film written by Kipp Tribble, from a story by Scott Hamm Duenas, and directed by Kenny Yates. It stars Scott Hamm Duenas, Kipp Tribble, Alison Haislip, Nija Okoro and Tobin Bell. It is Yates' feature directorial debut.

== Cast ==
- Tobin Bell as Von
- Scott Hamm Duenas as Will
- Kipp Tribble as Bryan
- Alison Haislip as Bella
- Nija Okoro as Lydia
- Kenny Yates as Ronnie
- Richard Siegelman as Stan
- Blake Koren as Shelly
- Billy Walker as Doctor

== Release ==
The film was released on VOD and digital platforms on March 7, 2023.

== Reception ==
Alan Ng of Film Threat awarded rated the film 7 out of 10 and wrote, "ReBroken is an earnest reflection on grief and loss, wrapped in a supernatural thriller with a surprise at the end. It is a well-acted, intriguing picture."
