= Brian F. Durkin =

American actor

- Born: May 17, 1976 (age 50); Charlotte, North Carolina, U.S.
- Education: University of Florida (BS)
- Occupation: Actor
- Years active: 2004–present

Brian F. Durkin (born May 17, 1976) is an American actor. He was born in Charlotte, North Carolina and earned a Bachelor of Science degree in building construction from University of Florida in 2000.

In 2019, Durkin joined other Writers Guild of America members in firing their agents as part of the WGA stand against the ATA and the practice of packaging.

== Filmography ==
=== Film ===
Year	Title	Role	Notes
2004	Bobby Jones: Stroke of Genius	Perry Adair	
2006	Only the Brave	Pool Hall Soldier	
2006	Madea's Family Reunion	Gene Barrelson	
2006	Broken Bridges	Donnie	
2006	The Ultimate Gift	Sarah's Boyfriend	
2006	Déjà Vu	National Guard Officer	
2007	My Father	Gabe Willis	
2008	An American Carol	US Marine at protest	
2009	Like Dandelion Dust	Bar Patron	
2009	Grilling Bobby Hicks	Deputy Dolvin Dukes	
2010	The Conspirator	Lieutenant	
2011	Footloose	Big Cowboy	
2012	Trouble with the Curve	Matt Nelson	
2012	Flight	Young Cop	Uncredited
2013	The Internship	Club Douche	
2013	Anchorman 2: The Legend Continues	Trevor	
2015	Faith of Our Fathers	Rocky	
2016	Term Life	John Stasio	
2016	Siren	Officer O'Brien	
2017	County Line	Crank Prattler	
2018	Superfly	Officer Turk Franklin	
2019	The Highwaymen	Deputy Prentiss Oakley	
2019	The Legend of 5 Mile Cave	Older Tommy	
2020	The Warrant	Blackjack	
2020	Emperor	Erbert Jenkins	
2021	Halloween Kills	Deputy Graham	

=== Television ===
Year	Title	Role	Notes
2005	Warm Springs	Elliott Roosevelt	Television film
2005	The O.C.	Cody	Episode: "The Return of the Nana"
2005	Faith of My Fathers	Henry Witt	Television film
2006	Tyler Perry's House of Payne	Police Officer	Episode: "When the Smoke Clears"
2007	The Staircase Murders	Brett Wolgamott	Television film
2007	Cold Case	Sailor '38	Episode: "World's End"
2007–2009	Days of Our Lives	Officer Chatsworth / Cop	15 episodes
2010	Army Wives	Coach Motts	Episode: "Hearts & Minds"
2010	Detroit 1-8-7	Uniformed Cop	Episode: "Pharmacy Double/Bullet Train"
2012	Final Witness	Glenn Turner	Episode: "Vixen's Elixir"
2016	Killing Reagan	Detective Eddie Myers	Television film
2016	The Walking Dead	George	Episode: "Sing Me a Song"
2016	Good Behavior	Arnold	Episode: "Beautiful Things Deserve Beautiful Things"
2017	Brockmire	Robbie Butler	3 episodes
2017	Stranger Things	Cop #1	Episode: "Chapter One: MADMAX"
