= FM (American TV series) =

- Genre: Sitcom
- Created by: Allan Burns; Dan Wilcox; Shelley Zellman
- Starring: Robert Hays; Patricia Richardson; Lynne Thigpen; DeLane Matthews
- Country of origin: United States
- Original language: English
- No. of seasons: 1
- No. of episodes: 13

Production
- Executive producers: Allan Burns; Dan Wilcox
- Producer: Andy Cadiff
- Production company: MTM Enterprises

Original release
- Network: NBC
- Release: August 17, 1989 – June 28, 1990

FM is an American television sitcom which aired on NBC in 1989 and 1990. The series title was a pun, referring both to the show's setting at an FM radio station and to its themes of female-male interaction.

== Plot ==
Set in Washington, D.C., the series was a workplace comedy which took place at 91.6/WGEO, a small public radio station. Robert Hays starred as program director Ted Costas, a man whose harried professional life and eccentric coworkers distract him from dealing with problems in his personal life, particularly his relationships with women. The women in his life include Lee-Ann Plunkett (Patricia Richardson), his ex-wife and a political commentator with the station; Gretchen Schreck (DeLane Matthews), a young woman he used to babysit who is now an intern for the station; Naomi Sayers (Lynne Thigpen), the station manager; and Maude (Nicole Huntington), his daughter with Lee-Ann.

The cast also included Leo Geter, Fred Applegate, James Avery and John Kassir.

The radio station in the series was partially based on KCRW in Santa Monica, California. Ted Costas was modeled on Tom Schnabel, and was the host of a morning radio show, Long Day's Journey into Lunch, which was based on Morning Becomes Eclectic.

== Scheduling ==
The show initially ran for five weeks as a summer series in 1989, premiering on August 17 in Dear John's regular Thursday night time slot following Cheers before moving to Wednesday nights for four more weeks. It then returned as a midseason replacement in 1990, airing eight more episodes between March 28 and June 28. The series was not renewed for a second season.

== Episodes ==
No.	Title	Directed by	Written by	Original release date
1	"Love or Money"	David Trainer	Allan Burns, Dan Wilcox and Shelley Zellman	August 17, 1989
2	"Play Laura for Me"	David Trainer	Allan Burns and Dan Wilcox	August 23, 1989
3	"Ultimate Aphrodisiac"	Andy Cadiff	Allan Burns and Howard M. Gould	August 30, 1989
4	"Kiss and Tell"	Andy Cadiff	Allan Burns and Dan Wilcox	September 6, 1989
5	"If a Man Answers"	Andy Cadiff	Paul Haggis	September 13, 1989
6	"Doing It Again"	Andy Cadiff	Howard M. Gould	March 28, 1990
7	"Leave It to Me"	Andy Cadiff	Howard M. Gould	April 4, 1990
8	"Two Taxing Women"	Burt Metcalfe	Roz Moore	April 11, 1990
9	"No Fool Like an April Fool"	Andy Cadiff	J. J. Wall	April 18, 1990
10	"Let's Spend the Night Together"	Dan Wilcox	Allan Burns	May 26, 1990
11	"The Last Virgin"	Andy Cadiff	Terrie Collins	June 2, 1990
12	"Sex, Lies and 35mm Slides"	Andy Cadiff	Howard M. Gould	June 9, 1990
13	"Off the Record"	Andy Cadiff	Lincoln Kibbee	June 28, 1990
