= Scott Bakula =

American actor (born 1954)

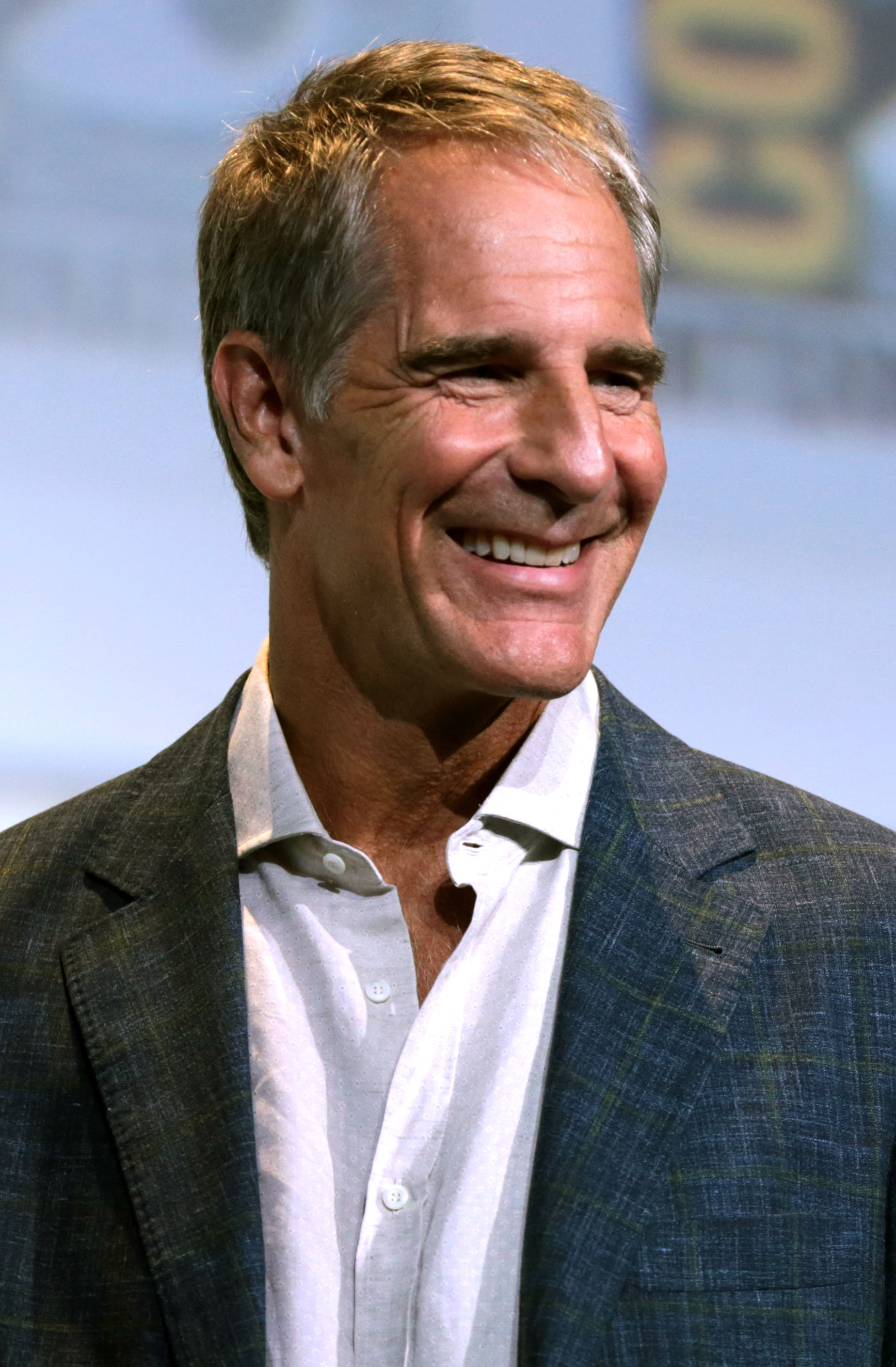
- Bakula at the 2016 San Diego Comic-Con
- Born: Scott Stewart Bakula; October 9, 1954 (age 72); St. Louis, Missouri, U.S.
- Occupation: Actor
- Years active: 1977–present
- Spouses: Krista Neumann (m. 1981; div. 1995); Chelsea Field (m. 2009)
- Children: 4

Scott Stewart Bakula (/ˈbækjʊlə/; born October 9, 1954) is an American actor. He played Sam Beckett on Quantum Leap – for which he was nominated for four Primetime Emmy Awards and three Golden Globe Awards (winning one) – and Captain Jonathan Archer on Star Trek: Enterprise. From 2014 to 2021, he portrayed Special Agent Dwayne Cassius "King" Pride on NCIS: New Orleans.

A Tony Award nominee for his work on Broadway, Bakula starred in the comedy-drama series Men of a Certain Age and guest-starred in the second and third seasons of NBC's Chuck as the title character's father, Stephen J. Bartowski. From 2014 to 2015, he played entrepreneur Lynn on the HBO show Looking.

== Early life ==
Bakula was born in St. Louis, Missouri, the son of Sally (née Zumwinkel) and Joseph Stewart Bakula (1928–2014), a lawyer. He has a younger brother and a younger sister. He attended Jefferson College, followed by the University of Kansas for a time, but left, saying:

...because I was offered a tour of Godspell, a national tour that was from St. Louis. I thought that sounded great, and I went to my parents and I said "I want to do this tour", and they said, "Go ahead, maybe it will get it out of your system. And you come back to school in a year or two, you come back." The tour was gonna start in August and the tour never started and school did, and then the tour fell apart, and there I was sitting at home. So I was left holding the bag, basically, and then had to decide where to go from there. And I applied, was applying to other schools. I was gonna go to a Mormon theatrical kind of school, and the more I looked at it the more I spent time examining the school side of it. I just realized what I really needed to do was just pick up, pack up and go to New York.

== Career ==
Bakula moved to New York City in 1976. He made his professional debut in the 1977 national tour of the musical Shenandoah. He made his Broadway debut in 1982 as an understudy in the short-lived musical Is There Life After High School? The following year, he appeared as baseball legend Joe DiMaggio in Marilyn: An American Fable, which only ran 17 performances. He received a shared Drama Desk Award nomination for Outstanding Ensemble Acting for his performance in the 1985 off-Broadway production of Three Guys Naked from the Waist Down; he would later appear in its Pasadena Playhouse production. The success of Three Guys Off-Broadway brought him attention, and when his next show, the musical Nightclub Confidential, which co-starred his wife Krista Neumann, moved to Los Angeles, he moved there at the urging of his California agent, Maggie Henderson, and his New York agent, Jerry Hogan. As Bakula recalled in 2000:

I call [Henderson] up and said I got a show, I'm gonna be out there, I'm coming out in January. So it'll work out because it's time for pilot season and I'll be doing something so people can come and see me. ... And then I coincidentally had done a Disney Sunday Night ABC movie that was gonna come out some time in the winter. It was the time to go. Came out here on New Year's Day, 1986. The show I did turned out to be a big hit out here. It got me a lot of attention out here and I jumped onto the TV sitcom Designing Women in the beginning and was able to do that pilot ... and things kind of took off.

He was cast in two short-lived series: Gung Ho and Eisenhower & Lutz. During a Hollywood writers' strike in 1988, he returned to New York to star in Romance/Romance on Broadway, which ran from May 1, 1988, to January 15, 1989. For his performance as Alfred Von Wilmers and Sam, he was nominated for the 1988 Tony Award for Best Actor in a Musical. Afterward, he landed the lead role opposite co-star Dean Stockwell in the science fiction television series Quantum Leap (1989–1993). Bakula played time traveler Dr. Sam Beckett, who was trapped by a malfunction of his time machine to correct things gone wrong in the past. His performance in the show earned him a Golden Globe Award (along with three nominations) and four Primetime Emmy Award nominations for Outstanding Lead Actor in a Drama Series, as well as five consecutive Viewers for Quality Television Awards for Best Actor in a Quality Drama Series.

From 1993 to 1995, he played Peter Hunt, a reporter and occasional love interest on the sitcom Murphy Brown. In 1995, Bakula appeared on the cover of Playgirl. He played the titular Mr. Smith in the sole season of Mr. & Mrs. Smith in 1996. He voiced Danny Cat in the animated film Cats Don't Dance (1997). He played the aging veteran pitcher Gus Cantrell in Major League: Back to the Minors (1998), the final movie in the Major League trilogy. He also played Jim Olmeyer, the same-sex partner of Sam Robards's Jim Berkley, in the film American Beauty (1999).

Bakula played Jonathan Archer, captain of Earth's first Warp 5 interstellar starship, on Star Trek: Enterprise from 2001 to 2005. In 2006, he reprised the role of Archer for the Star Trek: Legacy PC and Xbox 360 video games as a voice-over.

Bakula starred in the musical Shenandoah, a play which also provided his first professional theatrical role in 1976, at Ford's Theatre, in 2006. Bakula is heard singing "Pig Island" on Sandra Boynton's children's CD Philadelphia Chickens, which is labeled as being "For all ages except 43." Scott Bakula said that he might be starring as Sam in a Quantum Leap film as stated in TV Guide Magazine along with Dean Stockwell. At Comic Con 2010, he announced that a script was being worked on and that while he would be in the movie, he would not have the main role.

Bakula performed various songs from his career for a one-night-only performance entitled An Evening with Scott Bakula at Sidney Harman Hall on January 18, 2008, as a benefit for the restoration of the historic Ford's Theater. Bakula had three appearances in 2008. He appeared as Atty. Jack Ross in an episode of Boston Legal, "Glow in the Dark", which aired on February 12, 2008, on the ABC network. From March 4 – April 20, he starred as Tony Hunter in the world premiere of Dancing in the Dark at The Old Globe in San Diego, California. Dancing in the Dark is based on the movie The Band Wagon (1953). Bakula appeared as the character Chris Fulbright in the five-episode run of the Tracey Ullman sketch comedy series State of the Union on Showtime.

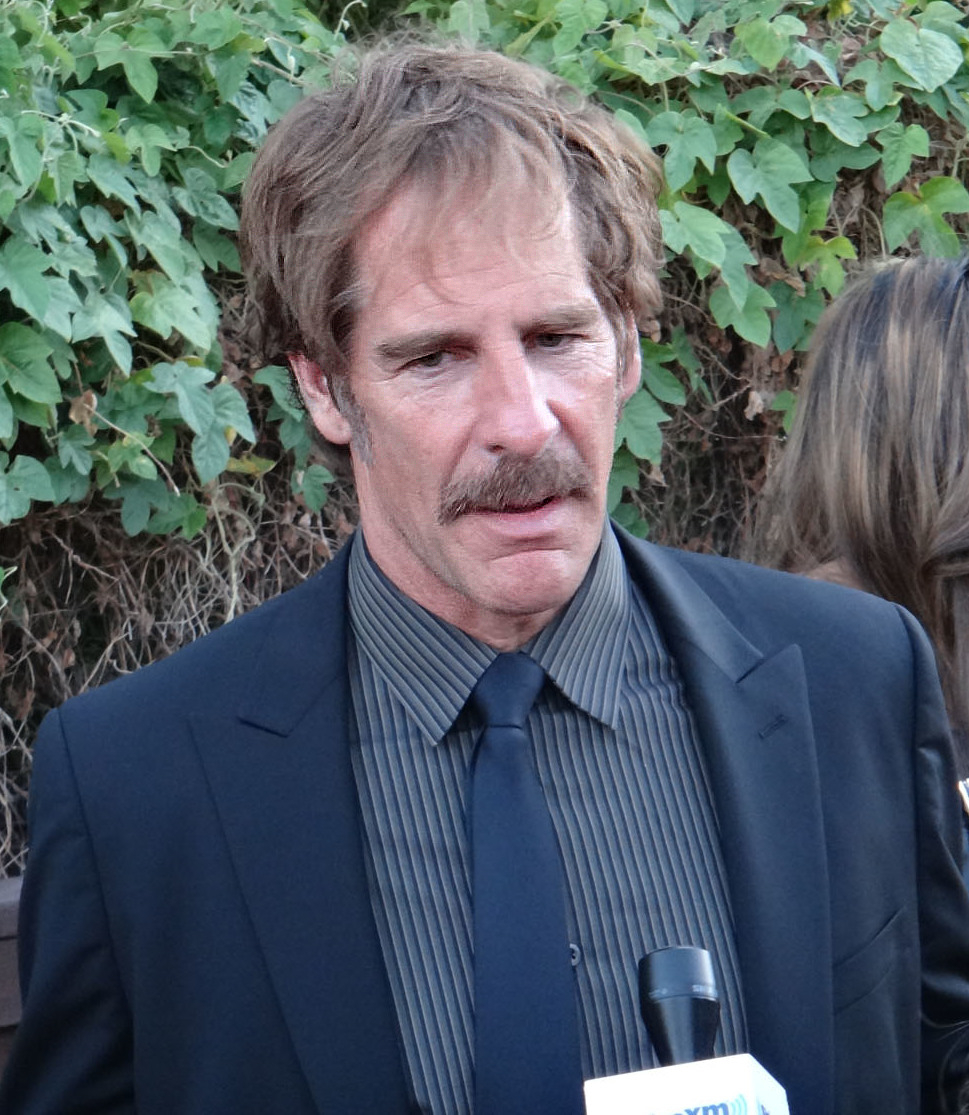
Bakula at the Saturn Awards, 2012

Bakula appeared in the dark comedy film The Informant! (2009) as Brian Shepard, an FBI agent. In April 2009, he began a recurring role on the television series Chuck as Stephen J. Bartowski, the eponymous character's long-lost father. From July 31 to August 2, 2009, he starred as Nathan Detroit in three performances of Guys and Dolls at the Hollywood Bowl. Beginning in December 2009, Bakula began appearing as Terry, one of the three lead characters in TNT's hour-long comedy/drama Men of a Certain Age.

In 2011, Bakula performed a voice cameo in the film Source Code as a slight nod to his character on Quantum Leap, with his catchphrase of "Oh, boy." and appeared in the feature-length documentary The Captains, which was written and directed by William Shatner, Bakula is interviewed by the original Star Trek captain about his life and career leading up to his performances as Captain Jonathan Archer in Star Trek: Enterprise. In the movie, Shatner interviews Bakula at his ranch in California where they discuss the pitfalls that come with a career in television.

In September 2011, Bakula starred in Terrible Advice by Saul Rubinek at the Menier Chocolate Factory. In April to May 2012, he guest starred in the last five episodes of Desperate Housewives as Bree Van de Kamp's criminal defense lawyer and third husband. In April 2013, he made a guest appearance on Two and a Half Men as a sleazy car dealer, Jerry. In August 2013, it was announced Bakula would have a recurring role in the first season of HBO's new series Looking. He also appeared in the film Geography Club (2013).

In February 2014, Bakula was cast as the lead in a backdoor pilot for the NCIS spin-off series, NCIS: New Orleans, which began as a two-part episode of its parent series in the spring season of 2014.

In 2016 Bakula appeared as a guest judge on the HGTV show Brothers Take New Orleans with Property Brothers hosts Jonathan and Drew Scott.

He made a cameo appearance as himself in the season 12 opening episode of It's Always Sunny in Philadelphia.

In October 2023, it was announced Bakula would return to the New York stage in the world premiere of The Connector, featuring music and lyrics by Jason Robert Brown and book by Jonathan Marc Sherman, and directed by Daisy Prince. The show was performed from January 12, 2024, through March 17 at the MCC Theater.

In August 2024, Bakula played the title role in a production of Man of La Mancha in Peterborough, New Hampshire.

== Personal life ==
Bakula married Krista Neumann in 1981. They had two children before divorcing in 1995. He married actress Chelsea Field in 2009 after a 15-year relationship during which they had two children.

Bakula says he was "hardly ever home for four and a half seasons" of Quantum Leap, so he chose to prioritize his family life on later projects. His Star Trek: Enterprise contract required that filming be completed by 6 p.m. every Wednesday so he could have dinner with his family. During filming of NCIS: New Orleans, he returned home to Los Angeles every weekend to spend time with his wife.

== Filmography ==
=== Film ===
Year	Title	Role	Notes
1990	Sibling Rivalry	Harry Turner	
1991	Necessary Roughness	Paul Blake	
1993	Mercy Mission: The Rescue of Flight 771	Jay Parkins	
1994	Color of Night	Bob Moore	
1994	A Passion to Kill	Dr. David Lawson	
1995	Lord of Illusions	Harry D'Amour	
1995	My Family	David Ronconi	
1997	Cats Don't Dance	Danny	Voice
1998	Major League: Back to the Minors	Gus Cantrell	
1999	American Beauty	Jim Olmeyer	
2000	Above Suspicion	James Stockton	
2000	Luminarias	Joseph	
2001	Life as a House	Officer Kurt Walker	
2002	Role of a Lifetime	Bobby Cellini / Buck Steele	
2009	The Informant!	FBI Special Agent Brian Shepard	
2011	Source Code	Colter's Father	Voice
2011	The Captains	Himself	
2013	Geography Club	Carl Land	
2013	Enter the Dangerous Mind	Kevin	
2013	Behind the Candelabra	Bob Black	
2014	Elsa & Fred	Raymond Hayes	
2016	Me Him Her	Mr. Ehrlick	
2016	Summertime	Paul's Father	
2017	Basmati Blues	Eric	
2023	Divinity	Sterling Pierce	

=== Television ===
Year	Title	Role	Notes
1986	My Sister Sam	Peter Strickland	Episode: "Teacher's Pet"
1986	The Disney Sunday Movie	Jeffrey Wilder	Episode: "I-Man"
1986–1987	Gung Ho	Hunt Stevenson	9 episodes
1986–1988	Designing Women	Ted Shively	5 episodes
1987	CBS Summer Playhouse	Dr. Paul Sanderson	Episode: "Infiltrator"
1987	The Last Fling	Drew	Television film
1987	Matlock	Jeb Palmer	2 episodes
1988	Eisenhower and Lutz	Barnett M. "Bud" Lutz, Jr.	Main role
1989–1993	Quantum Leap	Sam Beckett	Main role; also directed 3 episodes
1992	In the Shadow of a Killer	Det. David Mitchell	Television film
1993	Mercy Mission: The Rescue of Flight 771	Jay Perkins	Television film
1993	For Goodness Sake	Henry	Short
1993–1996	Murphy Brown	Peter Hunt	Recurring (seasons 6–8)
1994	Nowhere to Hide	Kevin Nicholas	Television film
1994	Men, Movies & Carol	Himself	
1994	Dream On	Aaron Hendrick, Kidnapper #1	2 episodes
1995	The Invaders	Nolan Wood	Miniseries
1995	Prowler	Jack Harcher	Television film
1996	The Bachelor's Baby	Jake Henry	Television film
1996–1997	Mr. & Mrs. Smith	Mr. Smith	Main role
1998	Adventures from the Book of Virtues	Elbegast the Robber Knight	
1999	Mean Streak	Det. Lou Mattoni	Television film
1999	NetForce	Alex Michaels	Television film
2000	Father Can't Cope	Wes Harrison	Television film
2000	In the Name of the People	John Burke	Television film
2000	Papa's Angels	Grins Jenkins	Television film
2000	The Trial of Old Drum	George Graham Vest	Television film
2001	A Girl Thing	Paul Morgan	Television film
2001	Late Boomers	Teddy Barnett	Television film
2001	What Girls Learn	Nick	Television film
2001–2005	Star Trek: Enterprise	Jonathan Archer	Main role
2006–2010	The New Adventures of Old Christine	"Papa Jeff" Hunter	4 episodes
2007	American Body Shop	Maury	Episode: "Juicy Lou's"
2007	Blue Smoke	John Minger	Television film
2008	Boston Legal	Jack Ross	Episode: "Glow in the Dark"
2008	Tracey Ullman's State of the Union	Chris Fulbright	4 episodes
2009	Guys and Dolls at the Hollywood Bowl	Nathan Detroit	Video
2009–2010	Chuck	Stephen J. Bartowski	Recurring role (season 2); guest role (season 3)
2009–2011	Men of a Certain Age	Terry Elliott	Main role
2012	Desperate Housewives	Trip Weston	5 episodes
2012	Family Guy	Himself	Episode: "Burning Down the Bayit"
2012	Law & Order: Special Victims Unit	Kent Webster	Episode: "Vanity's Bonfire"
2012	Table for Three	Robert Morton	Television film
2013	Behind the Candelabra	Bob Black	Television film
2013	Two and a Half Men	Jerry	Episode: "Bazinga! That's From a TV Show"
2013	Untitled Bounty Hunter Project	Pete	Television film
2014	Caper	Pete Blue	
2014–2015	Looking	Lynn	Recurring role
2014–2017	NCIS	Dwayne Pride	Special guest
2014–2021	NCIS: New Orleans	Dwayne Pride	Main role; producer
2016	Brothers Take New Orleans	Himself	Episode: "Welcome to the Big City"
2017	Cash Cab	Himself	Celebrity Edition
2017	It's Always Sunny in Philadelphia	Himself	Episode: "The Gang Turns Black"
2019	The Simpsons	Himself (voice)	Episode: "Bobby, It's Cold Outside"
2021	What We Do in the Shadows	Himself	Episode: "The Siren"
2022	Unbroken	Ash Holleran	Television film
2024	Only Murders in the Building	Himself	Episode: "Once Upon a Time in the West"

== Theater ==
Year	Title	Role	Notes
1977–1978	Shenandoah	Ensemble	National Tour
1979	Magic to Do	Performer	
1980	The Baker's Wife	Dominique	Playhouse in the Park (Cincinnati) production
1981	I Love My Wife	Performer	Playhouse in the Park (Cincinnati) production
1981	Ta-Dah!	Performer	Off-Broadway
1982	Is There Life After High School?	Understudy	Original Broadway production
1983	Marilyn: An American Fable	Joe DiMaggio	Original Broadway production
1985	3 Guys Naked from the Waist Down	Performer	Off-Broadway
1987, 1988	Romance/Romance	Alfred Von Wilmers, Sam	Original Off-Broadway and Broadway productions
1995	Anyone Can Whistle	J. Bowden Hapgood	Carnegie Hall
2007	No Strings	David Jordon	
2009	Guys and Dolls	Nathan Detroit	Hollywood Bowl
2011	Terrible Advice	Jake	Menier Chocolate Factory, London
2024	The Connector	Conrad O'Brien	MCC Theater (Off-Broadway)
2024	Man of La Mancha	Miguel de Cervantes / Don Quixote	Peterborough Players
2024	Mister Lincoln	Abraham Lincoln	One man show, at Ford's Theatre
2025	The Baker's Wife	Aimable Castagnet	Classic Stage Company, Off-Broadway

== Awards and nominations ==
Award	Year	Category	Nominated work	Result	Ref.
American Television Awards	1993	Best Actor in a Dramatic Series	Quantum Leap	Nominated	
Awards Circuit Community Awards	1999	Best Cast Ensemble	American Beauty	Nominated	
Drama Desk Awards	1985	Outstanding Ensemble Performance	Three Guys Naked from the Waist Down	Nominated	
Golden Globe Awards	1990	Best Actor in a Television Series – Drama	Quantum Leap	Nominated	
Golden Globe Awards	1991	Best Actor in a Television Series – Drama	Quantum Leap	Won	
Golden Globe Awards	1992	Best Actor in a Television Series – Drama	Quantum Leap	Nominated	
Online Film & Television Association Awards	2009	Best Guest Actor in a Comedy Series	Chuck	Nominated	
Online Film & Television Association Awards	2013	Best Supporting Actor in a Motion Picture or Miniseries	Behind the Candelabra	Nominated	
People's Choice Awards	2015	Favorite Actor in a New TV Series	NCIS: New Orleans	Nominated	
Primetime Emmy Awards	1990	Outstanding Lead Actor in a Drama Series	Quantum Leap	Nominated	
Primetime Emmy Awards	1991	Outstanding Lead Actor in a Drama Series	Quantum Leap	Nominated	
Primetime Emmy Awards	1992	Outstanding Lead Actor in a Drama Series	Quantum Leap	Nominated	
Primetime Emmy Awards	1993	Outstanding Lead Actor in a Drama Series	Quantum Leap	Nominated	
Primetime Emmy Awards	2013	Outstanding Supporting Actor in a Miniseries or a Movie	Behind the Candelabra	Nominated	
Saturn Awards	2002	Best Actor in a Television Series	Star Trek: Enterprise	Nominated	
Saturn Awards	2003	Best Actor in a Television Series	Star Trek: Enterprise	Nominated	
Saturn Awards	2004	Best Actor in a Television Series	Star Trek: Enterprise	Nominated	
ShoWest Convention	2015	Ensemble Award	Geography Club	Nominated	
Tony Awards	1988	Best Leading Actor in a Musical	Romance/Romance	Nominated	
Viewers for Quality Television Awards	1990	Best Actor in a Quality Drama Series	Quantum Leap	Won	
Viewers for Quality Television Awards	1991	Best Actor in a Quality Drama Series	Quantum Leap	Won	
Viewers for Quality Television Awards	1992	Best Actor in a Quality Drama Series	Quantum Leap	Won	
Viewers for Quality Television Awards	1993	Best Actor in a Quality Drama Series	Quantum Leap	Won	
Viewers for Quality Television Awards	1994	Special Player	Murphy Brown	Won	
Viewers for Quality Television Awards	1995	Special Player	Murphy Brown	Nominated	
