= Patricia Richardson =

American actress

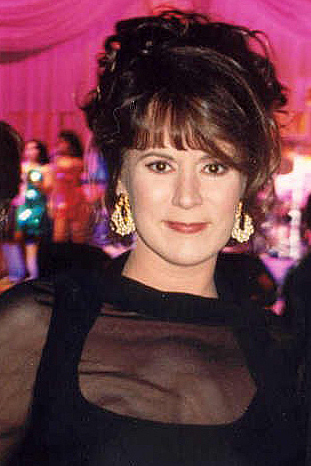
- Richardson after the 1994 Emmy Awards
- Born: February 23, 1951 (age 75); Bethesda, Maryland , U.S.
- Education: Southern Methodist University (BFA)
- Occupation: Actress
- Years active: 1974–present
- Known for: Jill Taylor in Home Improvement
- Spouse: Ray Baker (m. 1982; div. 1995)
- Children: 3

Patricia Richardson (born February 23, 1951) is an American actress best known for her portrayal of Jill Taylor on ABC sitcom Home Improvement, for which she was nominated four times for the Primetime Emmy Award for Outstanding Lead Actress in a Comedy Series and twice for the Golden Globe Award for Best Actress in a Television Series – Comedy or Musical. She also received an Independent Spirit Award nomination for her performance in Ulee's Gold (1997).

== Early life and education ==
Richardson was born Patricia Richardson on February 23, 1951, in Bethesda, Maryland. She attended multiple schools, including Holton-Arms School and Hockaday School. She is a 1972 graduate of Southern Methodist University.

== Career ==
Richardson began as the understudy for the role of Gypsy Rose Lee in Angela Lansbury's Broadway production of Gypsy: A Musical Fable in 1974, also playing several small chorus parts. In the next ten years, she worked in regional theater, made commercials, and had parts in Broadway and Off Broadway plays. She had roles in such programs as The Equalizer, Spenser: For Hire, and Kate & Allie. She appeared in one episode of The Cosby Show in the show's third season with her real-life husband, playing a woman giving birth to her ninth child. Richardson also appeared in the films Christmas Evil and C.H.U.D.. In 1989, she appeared in one episode of Quantum Leap as a radio station owner.

In 1983, she left New York for LA briefly, to do a sitcom centered on Katey Sagal's twin sisters, Liz and Jean Sagal, called Double Trouble, for Norman Lear. When asked to go back and do a second season after her contract expired, she passed in order to stay in New York and continue performing in Beth Henley's The Miss Firecracker Contest Off Broadway. A few years later, Allan Burns brought her back to Los Angeles to star in two sitcoms he produced: Eisenhower and Lutz and FM. Both shows ran for 13 episodes.

In 1991, three months after giving birth to twins, Richardson became a last-minute replacement for Frances Fisher in what would be her breakout role as Jill Taylor on ABC sitcom Home Improvement. Richardson received four Emmy nominations and two Golden Globe nominations in that role. While working on Home Improvement, she hosted the Emmys with Ellen DeGeneres, starred in miniseries Undue Influence with Brian Dennehy and Sophie & the Moonhanger on Lifetime with Lynn Whitfield, and earned an Independent Spirit nomination in 1997 for her first major theatrical film role in Ulee's Gold.

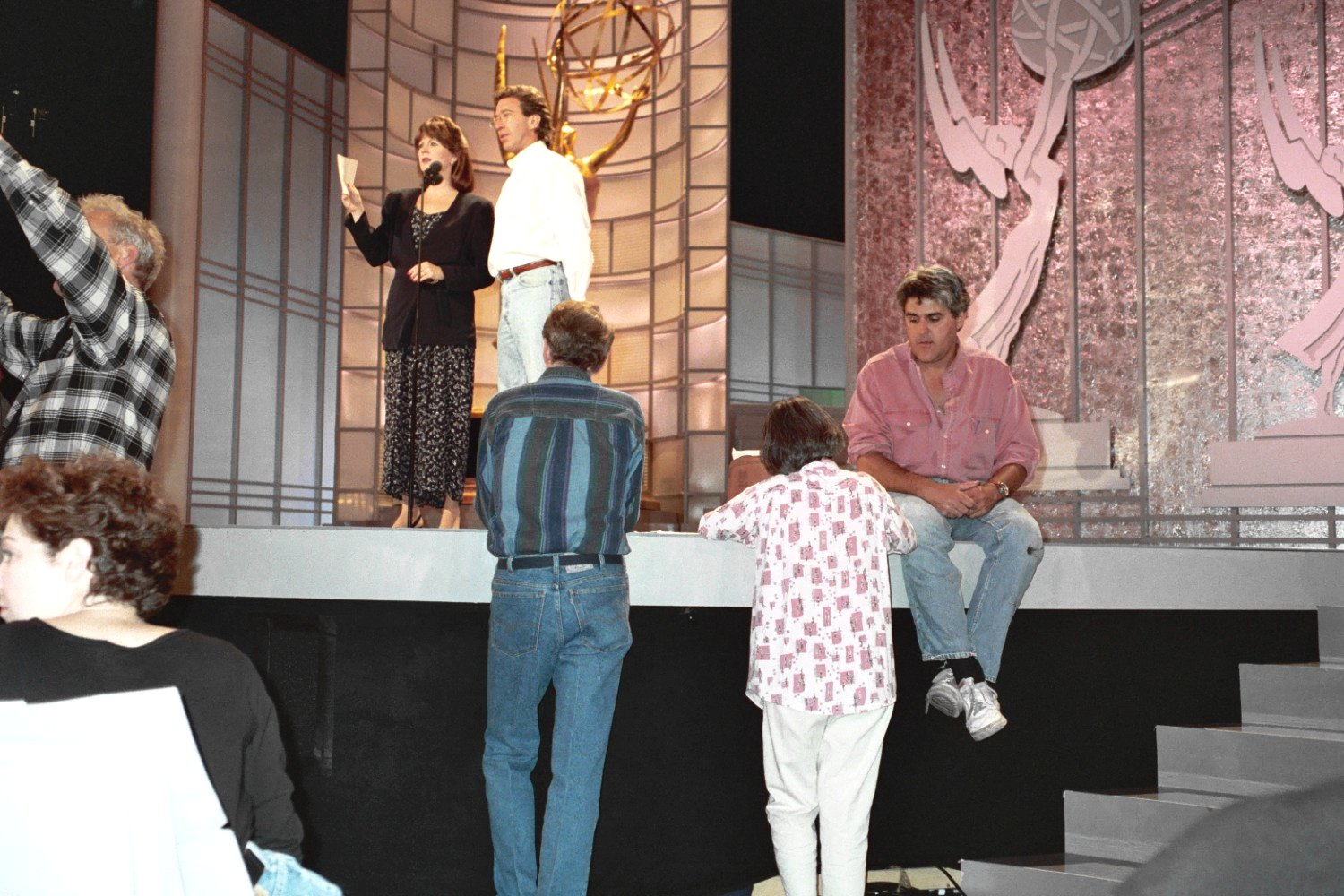
Richardson and co-star Tim Allen on-stage at the 45th Primetime Emmy Awards with late night host Jay Leno seated.

In 2002, Richardson replaced Janine Turner in the Lifetime medical drama series Strong Medicine, as a new character, Dr. Andy Campbell. She was nominated for two Prism Awards for her work in Strong Medicine. After three seasons on that show, she was cast in a recurring role as Sheila Brooks, campaign manager for Republican presidential candidate Arnold Vinick (Alan Alda) in the final two seasons of NBC political drama The West Wing.

Richardson appeared in the first season of Law & Order: Special Victims Unit. In 2008, she was executive producer of video documentary Long Story Short, which tells the story of Larry and Trudie Long, a popular Asian American nightclub act of the '40s and '50s, told through the eyes of the Longs' daughter and her friend, actress Jodi Long. In 2010, she appeared in an NBC made-for-TV film, The Jensen Project, and in 2011, she appeared in the Lifetime television film Bringing Ashley Home, also starring A.J. Cook and Jennifer Morrison. In 2012, she starred in the coming-of-age film Beautiful Wave and in the following year appeared in the Hallmark Channel TV film Smart Cookies. Since then, Richardson has filmed several small independent films and two more movies for the Hallmark channel: Friend Request and Snow Bride.

In the 12th episode of the fourth season of Last Man Standing, titled "Helen Potts", Richardson guest-starred as the titular character and reunited with her former Home Improvement co-star Tim Allen. At the end of the episode, it was revealed that the name of one of her sons is Randy, who was portrayed by another Home Improvement co-star: Jonathan Taylor Thomas. Richardson returned as Helen Potts in the next season. In a season 4 outtake, she accidentally calls Mike "Tim", Tim Allen's character (and her screen husband) on Home Improvement.

In 2015, she ran for the position of national president of the SAG-AFTRA after serving on the board for one term. She lost the election narrowly to incumbent President Ken Howard. She was re-elected to the national and local Los Angeles boards of SAG-AFTRA.

In 2016, Richardson returned to the stage in Steel Magnolias at the Bucks County Playhouse in New Hope, Pennsylvania. The production was directed by four-time Oscar nominee Marsha Mason and also starred Elaine Hendrix, Lucy DeVito, Jessica Walter, and Susan Sullivan. On June 9, 2016, the production became the highest-grossing show in the history of the Bucks County Playhouse.

== Personal life ==
Richardson married fellow actor Ray Baker in 1982. They had three children together: Henry Richardson Baker (born February 22, 1985) and twins Roxanne Elizabeth Baker and Joe Castle Baker (born January 3, 1991) before divorcing in 1995.

Richardson had a long-term relationship with retired psychologist Mark Cline, whom she had met when both were students at Southern Methodist University.

Richardson served many years on the board of directors and is national spokesperson for CurePSP, a patient advocacy and research organization for progressive supranuclear palsy, corticobasal degeneration, multiple system atrophy, and related prime-of-life diseases. Her father died of PSP in 2005.

== Filmography ==
=== Film ===
Year	Title	Role	Notes
1980	You Better Watch Out	Mrs. Garcia	
1984	C.H.U.D.	Ad Woman	
1986	Yuri Nosenko, KGB	Joan Black	TV movie
1987	Hands of a Stranger	Helen	TV movie
1989	Parent Trap III	Cassie McGuire	TV movie
1989	Lost Angels	Mrs. Anderson	
1989	In Country	Cindy	
1996	Sophie & the Moonhanger	Bonnie Edgerton	Voice role; TV movie
1996	Undue Influence	Laurel Vega	TV movie
1997	Ulee's Gold	Connie Hope	Nominated: Independent Spirit Award for Best Supporting Female
2001	Blonde	Gladys Pearl Baker	
2001	Viva Las Nowhere	Helen/Wanda	
2005	Candy Paint	Linda Miller	Short
2007	California Dreaming	Aunt Bonnie	
2009	Lost Dream	Patricia	
2010	The Jensen Project	Ingrid Jensen	TV movie
2011	Bringing Ashley Home	Michelle McGee	TV movie
2012	Beautiful Wave	Sue Davenport	Direct to video
2012	Smart Cookies	Lola	
2012	Avarice	Claire	
2013	Snow Bride	Maggie Tannenhill	
2013	Chance at Romance	May	
2017	County Line	Maddie Hall	
2018	A Christmas in Tennessee	Martha	
2019	Cubby	Peggy Nabel	
2019	A Very Vintage Christmas	Margaret	
2023	County Line: No Fear	Maddie	

=== Television ===
Year	Title	Role	Notes
1979	The Doctors	Nurse Marion	
1981	Love, Sidney	n/a	Episode: "A Piece of the Rock"
1984	Double Trouble	Beth McConnell	Recurring role
1985	ABC Weekend Special	Pamela Sawyer	Episode: "The Adventures of Con Sawyer and Hucklemary Finn"
1985	Kate & Allie	Pamela	Episode: "The Reunion"
1986	Spenser: For Hire	Sarah Cabot	Episode: "Shadowsight"
1986	The Equalizer	Woman	Episode: "Torn"
1987	The Cosby Show	Mrs. Schrader	Episode: "Calling Doctor Huxtable"
1987	The Equalizer	Sandy	Episode: "In the Money"
1988	Eisenhower and Lutz	Kay 'K.K.' Dunne	Recurring role
1989	Quantum Leap	Rachel Porter	Episode: "Good Morning, Peoria – September 9, 1959"
1989–1990	FM	Lee-Ann Plunkett	Recurring role
1991–1999	Home Improvement	Jill Taylor	Main role; Nominated: Golden Globe Award for Best Actress – Television Series Musical or Comedy (1994–1995); Nominated: People's Choice Award for Favorite Female TV Performer; Nominated: Primetime Emmy Award for Outstanding Lead Actress in a Comedy Series (1994 & 1996–1998); Nominated: Viewers for Quality Television Award for Best Actress in a Quality Comedy Series; Nominated: Viewers for Quality Television Award for Best Supporting Actress in a Quality Comedy Series
1999	Law & Order: Special Victims Unit	Annabel Hayes	Episode: "Wanderlust"
2002–2005	Strong Medicine	Dr. Andy Campbell	Main role Nominated: Prism Award for Best Performance in a Drama Series
2005–2006	The West Wing	Sheila Brooks	Recurring role
2015–2016	Last Man Standing	Helen Potts	Episodes: "Helen Potts" & "Tanks For The Memories"
2019	Blindspot	Dr. Nora Lee Roga	Episode: "The Big Reveal"
2021	NCIS	Judy Price Fielding	Episode: "Docked"
2022	The Blacklist	Matilda	Episode: "Genuine Models Inc."
2022-2023	Grey's Anatomy	Tessa Hobbes	"Thunderstruck" & "I'll Follow the Sun"
2025	Shifting Gears	Grief Group Member	"Secret"
