= County Line: No Fear =

- Directed by: Brent Christy
- Written by: James Phillips
- Starring: Tom Wopat; Patricia Richardson; Kelsey Crane; Denim Richards
- Cinematography: Brent Christy
- Production company: INSP Films
- Distributed by: Imagicomm Entertainment
- Release date: 2022
- Country: United States
- Language: English

County Line: No Fear is a 2022 American action film and the third installment of the County Line film series. Tom Wopat returns as Sheriff Alden Rockwell, with the film airing on the INSP network. It was released exclusively for streaming on Vudu in December 2022, with the DVD version of the film released in April 2023.

== Plot ==
Sheriff Alden Rockwell has his retirement interrupted when an organised crime gang begins to scale up its operations in a neighboring county and threatens the family of Jo Porter. Tom Wopat reprises the role of Rockwell, and Kelsey Crane again plays Sheriff Jo Porter. Rockwell aims to help out to protect the future of both counties.

== Main cast ==
- Tom Wopat as Alden Rockwell
- Kelsey Crane as Joanne Porter
- Denim Richards as Dante Hill
- Patricia Richardson as Maddie
- Casper Van Dien as Zed Dalton
- Abbi Butler as Ember Rockwell
- Joseph Curtis Callender as Agent Pierson

== Production and release ==
Production of County Line: No Fear was announced in August 2021, along with a list of other films to be filmed in Wilmington, North Carolina. Senator Roy Cooper commented on County Line: No Fear as one of the films helping the growth of the film industry in NC. The official trailer for the film was released in December 2022.

== Reception ==
ActionReloaded gave the film a positive review, receiving a verdict of 4.5 out of 5 stars.
