= Sherel =

Sherel can be a masculine given name, a middle name, or a surname. Notable people with the name include:

- Sherel Floranus (born 1998), Dutch-born football right back
- Rena Sherel Sofer, American actress
- Tasia Sherel, American actress and model
