= The Night Clerk =

2020 film directed by Michael Cristofer

- Theatrical release poster
- Directed by: Michael Cristofer
- Written by: Michael Cristofer
- Produced by: David M. Wulf; Arianne Fraser; Tye Sheridan
- Starring: Tye Sheridan; Ana de Armas; John Leguizamo; Helen Hunt
- Cinematography: Noah Greenberg
- Edited by: Kristi Shimek
- Music by: Erik Hall
- Production companies: Highland Film Group; WulfPak Productions; Convergent Media
- Distributed by: Saban Films
- Release date: February 21, 2020 (United States)
- Running time: 90 minutes
- Country: United States
- Language: English
- Box office: $302,127

The Night Clerk is a 2020 American crime drama film, written and directed by Michael Cristofer. It stars Tye Sheridan, Ana de Armas, John Leguizamo and Helen Hunt, and follows a hotel night clerk who becomes the center of a murder investigation. The film was released on February 21, 2020, by Saban Films. On June 6, 2020, Netflix released the film on its platform.

== Plot ==
Bart Bromley lives with his mom and has Asperger syndrome. He places hidden cameras in a room at the hotel where he works as a night desk clerk and uses the live feeds and recordings to overcome his social awkwardness by imitating the speech and mannerisms of the guests. On his nightly shift, Bart watches Karen, who has recently checked in. After his shift, he buys ice cream, goes home, and continues to watch Karen.

Bart sees Karen let an unknown man into her room. After they argue, the man begins to beat her. Bart watches as a gun falls from Karen's purse, then drives to the hotel to try to rescue her. He enters via a side door, and soon afterward Bart's co-worker Jack hears a gunshot. Jack enters Karen's room, where he finds Karen dead and Bart sitting on the bed. While Jack calls 911, Bart removes the hidden cameras, but accidentally leaves a storage card behind.

The next day, Bart is questioned by Detective Espada and claims he went home after buying ice cream, then returned to the hotel because he forgot his wallet. Espada realizes Bart is lying because if he had not had his wallet, he would not have been able to buy ice cream. Bart later re-watches the recording of Karen's room and sees that the man she met had a tattoo of a bird on his arm.

The next day, Bart's boss reassigns him to a new hotel. On his first shift, he meets Andrea Rivera, who recognizes that he has Asperger's, flirts with him, and checks into a room. The next day, Bart finds that he is missing a storage card, which Espada finds. Bart places cameras in Andrea's room and later shares a kiss with her near the hotel's pool.

The following day, Bart gets a haircut and buys a new suit, car, and cologne. He tries to visit Andrea at the hotel, only to find her having sex with the unknown man from Karen's room, whom he recognizes from the tattoo. Bart returns home and finds police have taken all his computer and camera equipment. He tells Espada his hard drives are empty because he deleted all the recordings before police arrived. After Espada leaves, Bart retrieves a hidden hard drive that contains a copy of the recording from Karen's room.

The unknown man Bart saw with Andrea is Karen's husband Nick, a detective who has been having an affair with Andrea and wants her to kill Bart so he cannot identify Nick to police. As Bart watches the cameras in Andrea's room, he sees Nick argue with her and start to beat her. He rushes to the hotel and enters Andrea's room as Nick leaves, then shows Andrea the hidden cameras. At his house, he shows her the recording from Karen's room and Andrea sees that Nick killed Karen. Andrea begins to cry and goes to sleep in Bart's bed. He lies down with her and falls asleep.

The following morning, Bart finds that Andrea is gone, as is the hard drive on which he had the copy of the recording from Karen's room. He also finds that Andrea has left the gun from Karen's purse on his bed. Andrea gives Nick the hard drive with the recording of Karen's room, and they start to drive out of town. The police arrive at Bart's house and find that Bart is not there, but has left the gun and the camera storage cards along with a note for Espada. Nick and Andrea signaled to pull over. Bart walks through a local mall and practices the conversational speech and body language he has observed in his recordings.

== Cast ==
- Tye Sheridan as Bartholemew "Bart" Bromley, Ethel's son
- Helen Hunt as Ethel Bromley, Bart's mother
- Ana de Armas as Andrea Rivera
- John Leguizamo as Detective Espada
- Johnathon Schaech as Detective Nick Perretti
- Jacque Gray as Karen Perretti
- Austin Archer as Jack Miller

== Production ==
The film was announced in February 2018, with Michael Cristofer directing from his own screenplay and Tye Sheridan cast to star.

Helen Hunt, Ana de Armas and John Leguizamo were cast in May 2018, with filming beginning in Utah on May 21, and continuing to June 22. In June 2018, Johnathon Schaech joined the cast.

== Release ==
The film was released on February 21, 2020. On June 6, 2020, the film was released on Netflix and made it onto the streamer's Top Ten chart, debuting at number six.

== Critical reception ==
On the review aggregator website Rotten Tomatoes, 34% of 44 critics' reviews are positive, with an average rating of 5/10. The website's consensus reads: "With a pair of charismatic leads struggling to enliven a poorly conceived story, The Night Clerk checks out early -- and viewers may want to follow suit." On Metacritic, the film holds a rating of 44 out of 100, based on 11 critics, indicating "mixed or average reviews".

NPR's Mark Jenkins wrote, "The Night Clerk is such a tiny mystery that it barely intrigues at all. The film may intend to be a Rear Window for the mini-cam era, but it lacks Hitchockian perplexity and perversity." Frank Scheck of The Hollywood Reporter said the film "presumes to be a thriller about a hotel clerk who accidentally witnesses the murder of one of his guests and winds up becoming a suspect himself, although there's little about it that feels suspenseful... The results aren't fully satisfying on any level, despite a terrific cast". The New York Post's Sara Stewart said it "doesn't approach the head-slapping melodrama of, say, Rain Man, but still evokes an occasional wince, in spite of Sheridan's efforts at portraying the nuances of Asperger's syndrome — and the screenplay's showcasing the range of how people respond to interactions with his character."

The Los Angeles Times's Michael Rechtshaffen was more positive, writing, "Those anticipating something more traditionally calibrated will likely be disappointed with the film's muted thrills and noncommittal denouement, but the elegantly composed film nevertheless makes for a creepy, contemplative entry in the Cristofer canon." Lisa Kennedy of Variety wrote, "the police procedural aspects of The Night Clerk are as second-rate as the detective's investigation. But the movie's more emotional quandaries compel... And Sheridan and de Armas's scenes together leave an impression long after the rest of the movie evaporates."
