= Taegen Burns =

American actress

- Born: April 21, 2007 (age 19); Vancouver, British Columbia, Canada
- Occupation: Actress
- Years active: 2017–present

Taegen Burns (born April 21, 2007) is a Canadian-born American actress. She is best known for playing Taylor in the horror film Imaginary as well as Maya Kasper in the comedy series The Mighty Ducks: Game Changers.

== Early life ==
Burns was born in Vancouver, British Columbia.

== Career ==
Burns first appearance on television came in the biographical film Michael Jackson: Searching for Neverland where she plays Michael's daughter Paris. Burns appeared in the films Blue Ridge and Dumplin' in major roles.

Burns was then cast as Ashley in The Gateway starring Shea Whigham and Olivia Munn. Her most well known role so far in her career is as Maya Kasper in The Mighty Ducks: Game Changers.

In 2024, Burns landed the role of Maddie Wise in the INSP drama, Blue Ridge. After the show was a big success and made the top 10 most streamed shows on Amazon Prime, it was renewed for a second season. Burns returned to the show as Maddie in 2026.

== Personal life ==
Burns likes to paint and read in her free time. Her favourite TV show is The Office and she is also a big of fan of Broadchurch and Outer Banks.

== Filmography ==
=== Film ===
Year	Title	Role	Notes
2017	Michael Jackson: Searching for Neverland	Paris Jackson	
2018	I Can Only Imagine	Young Shannon	
2018	Dumplin'	Young Ellen	
2020	Blue Ridge	Maddie Wise	
2021	The Gateway	Ashley	
2024	Imaginary	Taylor	

=== Television ===
Year	Title	Role	Notes
2020	The Right Stuff	Laura Shepard	5 episodes
2022	Monarch	Young Nicky	2 episodes
2021-2022	The Mighty Ducks: Game Changers	Maya Kasper	20 episodes
2024-present	Blue Ridge	Maddie Wise	Recurring main cast
