= Blue Ridge (TV series) =

- Created by: Gary Wheeler
- Written by: Gary Wheeler; Chris Dowling
- Starring: Johnathon Schaech; Sarah Lancaster; A Martinez
- Country of origin: United States
- Original language: English
- No. of series: 2
- No. of episodes: 14

Production
- Running time: 45 minutes
- Production company: Imagicomm Pictures

Original release
- Network: INSP; Amazon Prime Video
- Release: April 7, 2024 – present

Blue Ridge is an American action-crime television series, based on the film of the same name. The film Blue Ridge aired in 2020, with former Green Beret Justin Wise as the main character. The story continues in the series following Justin's new life in the Blue Ridge Mountains.

The first season of the show aired on INSP and Western Bound in spring 2024. It since became available on Amazon Prime Video, along with other streaming platforms. It was renewed for a second season in 2025, and is set to air on INSP beginning in July 2026. It was also made available for streaming on Universal TV earlier in 2026.

== Series overview ==
Blue Ridge is set in a small Appalachian town in the Blue Ridge Mountains, located in North Carolina. The series follows on from the aftermath of the events of the 2020 film of the same name. A former Green Beret named Justin Wise has become the town sheriff in order to be closer to his ex‑wife, Ellie and their teenage daughter, Maddie. Although Wise hopes for a quiet life, the community is repeatedly rocked by murders, arson, kidnappings, drug trafficking, and other violent crimes that expose deep‑seated feuds, and long‑buried secrets.

The first season aired in spring 2024, and begins with the suspicious fire at the local police station. It shattered Wise's fragile stability as he attempts to juggle family and work life. Investigations into the fire draw him into a series of investigations that pit him against powerful local families and traveling criminals. The series ends with Wise's family in grave danger during a kidnapping at the police station and a tense standoff as attempts are made to rescue the family.

Justin Wise's central dilemma deepens in the second season, following the hostage crisis. He took the mountain job for a quieter life and to be closer to Elli and Maddie, but things aren't working out as planned. Instead, both women are actively helping him on the job, with Maddie helping crack a theater murder and Elli joining him in a mountain rescue. While this brings the family closer together, it becomes clear how regularly they are put in danger. With the return of Oak Miller and a string of dangerous outsiders, the supposedly sleepy town becomes at times a lawless place, and Wise must take on the criminal underworld to restore the peaceful retreat he hoped for.

== Cast ==
- Johnathon Schaech as Justin Wise
- Sarah Lancaster as Elli Wise
- Taegen Burns as Maddie Wise
- A Martinez as Connor McGrath
- Avianna Mynhier as Maxine 'Maxx' Covington
- Greg Perrow as Deputy R.P. Ericsson
- Tom Proctor as Jeremiah Wade
- Lev Cameron as Blade Wade
- Odessa Feaster as Mayor Brady
- Grayson Russell as Dwayne Dixon
- Burgess Jenkins as Ryan Lucas

== Release and development ==
The first season of the series was greenlit by Imagicomm Entertainment in March 2023, and was filmed in Charlotte, North Carolina. The official trailer for the series was released on YouTube in February 2024. The first episode aired on April 7, 2024.

The second season completed filming in 2025, with both INSP and Universal TV announcing they would air the second season in 2026. In May 2026, the return of Blue Ridge to INSP was confirmed with the first episode of the second season airing July 19, 2026. The season would contain eight episodes, two more than the previous season. In the summer of 2026, it became available for streaming on Amazon Prime Video.

== Critical reception ==
After the airing of the second season, many have categorized Blue Ridge as a sleeper hit. The series began on INSP only, before streaming providers began to air the series. Pluto TV, Amazon Prime Video and Roku have all seen the show rise into their Top 10 most watched programs, more so with the second season. On Amazon, the series at times traded places with the blockbuster TV show, Reacher.

The series has received steady reviews on IMDb with an overall rating of 6.6. Positive reviewers praise it as entertaining, family-friendly viewing built around a single father raising his daughter alongside his ex-wife's family, and describe him as dealing with some PTSD. On Amazon, it has received a 4.4 out of 5 rating.

== Episodes ==
=== Season 1 (2024) ===
The release dates were on Western Bound.

No. overall	No. in season	Title	Original release date
1	1	"Pilot"	April 7, 2024
After the town police station is destroyed in a suspicious fire, Blue Ridge sheriff Justin Wise must balance protecting his community with raising his teenage daughter.
2	2	"The Legend of Oak Miller"	April 14, 2024
A group of thrill-seekers pull off a Wild West-style robbery on a rural road, drawing Sheriff Justin Wise into conflict with their dangerous victim, a notorious and violent bull rider.
3	3	"Heels and Faces"	April 21, 2024
When a corrupt local wrestling promoter is discovered dead beneath the ring at Blue Ridge High School, Justin and his team uncover a long list of suspects with reasons to want him gone.
4	4	"Appalachian Waltz"	April 28, 2024
Justin’s rare day off is disrupted when a troubled country band gets stranded in town, forcing him to deal with their intimidating bodyguard and growing feelings for the band’s violinist.
5	5	"Land Grab"	May 5, 2024
A respected horse trainer is murdered just before retiring, and Justin’s team soon discovers a sudden change to her will that could explain both her death and the motive behind it.
6	6	"Locked In"	May 12, 2024
Justin faces a personal crisis when an enraged army veteran takes his ex-wife and daughter hostage inside the Blue Ridge police station, forcing him to risk everything to protect them.

=== Season 2 (2026) ===
The release dates are for Western Bound. Episodes were also made available for streaming on Universal TV in 2026.

No. overall	No. in season	Title	Original release date
7	1	"Hope, Deferred"	July 19, 2026
When bounty hunter Hope Henry arrives hunting the fugitive accused of killing her mentor, Sheriff Justin Wise has a busy couple of days dealing with the fallout.
8	2	"Going Around in Circles"	July 26, 2026
When a member of the Hughes racing dynasty is found dead, Sheriff Justin Wise must untangle a web of rivalries, romances, and buried family secrets to uncover the truth.
9	3	"Out of the Woods"	August 2, 2026
A quiet father-daughter camping trip takes a dangerous turn when Sheriff Justin Wise and Maddie stumble upon a hidden den of ruthless drug dealers.
10	4	"Four-Rail Kick"	August 9, 2026
An old friend of Justin’s arrives unannounced, but it quickly becomes clear the visit has more to do with a looming gambling debt than a friendly reunion.
11	5	"The Return of Oak Miller"	August 16, 2026
A deadly drug floods the Blue Ridge hollers as an old enemy returns, forcing Justin into an uneasy alliance to stop it.
12	6	"Montagues and Moonshine"	August 23, 2026
A murder at the local theater throws a production of Romeo and Juliet into chaos, as Justin and Maddie race to unmask the killer before another life is claimed.
13	7	"A Matter of Perspective"	August 30, 2026
An officer-involved shooting threatens to reignite a long-standing feud in Blue Ridge, forcing Justin to cut through the uncertainty and uncover the truth.
14	8	"Moving Mountains"	September 6, 2026
After a devastating landslide, Justin and Elli race against time to free and transport two injured people down a treacherous mountain pass to medical help before it is too late.
