= The Journey of Allen Strange =

American science fiction television series

- The cast of The Journey of Allen Strange
- Genre: Science fiction Drama
- Created by: Thomas W. Lynch
- Starring: Arjay Smith; Erin J. Dean; Shane Sweet; Jack Tate
- Country of origin: United States
- No. of seasons: 3
- No. of episodes: 57

Production
- Running time: 22 minutes
- Production companies: Lynch Entertainment; Nickelodeon Productions

Original release
- Network: Nickelodeon
- Release: November 8, 1997 – April 23, 2000

The Journey of Allen Strange is an American television series that aired on Nickelodeon's SNICK block of programming for three seasons from November 1997 to April 2000.

== Premise ==
The series follows the story of a young Xelan alien (Arjay Smith) who is stranded on Earth, and meets up with a young girl Robbie Stevenson (Erin J. Dean), her younger brother Josh (Shane Sweet), and their father Ken (Jack Tate). This family eventually adopts him, giving him the name "Allen Strange". He has extraordinary powers, including the ability to turn into his alien form, which allows him to hover. He uses his abilities to bring a mannequin in a sporting goods store to life; this "animated mannequin" poses as his Earth father, Manfred, for events like parent-teacher conferences. He also possesses extremely high intelligence and can read incredibly fast by simply placing his hand on the cover of a book. He also seems to have advanced dexterity and athletic muscle memory, as he once observed a neighborhood basketball game and perfectly duplicated the trajectory of shots when he attempted this himself. He has an affinity for canned cheese, and lives in the family's attic in a strange alien cocoon. Allen's ultimate goal is to return to his homeworld of Xela, but he admits that may be a long time away as he stowed away on an exploratory ship which was studying Earth, which had to flee out of fear of discovery.

Allen said he "chose" to disguise himself as an African-American boy as the first Earth people he spied upon were some African-American men playing basketball, and figured this was a way to acculturate. His naivety on the subject (bringing in plain black posterboards for his Black History Month presentation) sparked a Black History Month episode, featuring him learning information about slavery and the Civil Rights Movement.

In the weeks leading up to the series' premiere, Nickelodeon ran a series of teaser ads which would at first appear to be promos for other shows, or for Nickelodeon in general, when a blue ooze would fill the screen as an announcer said cryptically, "Something strange is coming to SNICK. November 8". It would then clear out and the interrupted promo would conclude as if nothing had happened.

== Characters ==
=== Main ===
- Allen Strange (Arjay Smith) – A Xelan alien disguised as a human – all he wishes to do is to go back to his planet.
- Roberta "Robbie" Stevenson (Erin J. Dean) – A 15-year-old girl who enjoys surfing and helps show Allen how to fit in with humans.
- Joshua "Josh" Stevenson (Shane Sweet) – Robbie's 11-year-old younger brother and a science whiz.
- Kenneth "Ken" Stevenson (Jack Tate) – an architect and Robbie and Josh's father who is unaware of Allen being an alien.

=== Recurring ===
- Gail Stevenson (Mary Chris Wall) – a nurse and Robbie and Josh's mother who is separated from their father, but always comes to visit them.
- Manfred Strange (Robert Crow) – Originally just a store mannequin, but was brought to life to serve as Allen's Earth father. He often helps Allen out of dangerous situations and is a good friend of Ken who nicknames him "Manny".
- Latanya (Jaquita Ta'le) - Robbie's best friend who shares the same interests.
- Harold "Moose" Johnson (Sean Babb) – The captain of the high school wrestling team and also a bully. Allen tries several times to befriend him after he unintentionally upsets him, but his strange habits only annoy him.
- Erika (Evan Scott) - Robbie's other best friend.
- Hamilton Gerrigan (Ethan Glazer) - A close friend of Allen who hangs out with him and Josh, but is a little accident prone.
- Ms. String (Marianne Muellerleile) - The Dean of Delport High School and also one of Allen's teachers who praises his achievements and inadvertently gets caught up in his accidental alien activities.
- Talia (Aiysha Sinclair) - Another classmate of Robbie and Allen at Delport High who, though sometimes rude and entitled, is caring.
- Phil Berg (Dee Bradley Baker) – Allen's recurring arch-enemy, a crazed alien hunter and journalist who constantly tries to capture Allen and expose him for a top news story. He was later captured by the Xelans' enemies, the Trykloids, and used as a pawn for information on Earth.
- Shaw (J. Kenneth Campbell) - Allen's second arch-enemy, another sinister alien hunter whose face is barely shown and appearance is hidden with a big black fedora and a trench coat. He is the leader of the secret government agency A.R.C. (Alien Retrieval Commission). He wants to capture Allen and lock him up to prove to the world that aliens exist. He sometimes teams up with Phil Berg to achieve this goal.

== Episodes ==
=== Series overview ===
Season	Episodes	Originally released	
Season	Episodes	First released	Last released
1	13	November 8, 1997	February 26, 1998
2	26	August 31, 1998	April 28, 1999
3	18	December 5, 1999	April 23, 2000

=== Season 1 (1997–1998) ===
No. overall	No. in season	Title	Directed by	Written by	Original release date
1	1	"Arrival"	Paul Hoen	Thomas W. Lynch	November 8, 1997
2	2	"Entry"	Victor DuBois	Alfa-Betty Olsen & Marshall Efron	November 15, 1997
3	3	"Space"	Jason Marsden	David Garber	November 22, 1997
4	4	"Gronpoly"	Paul Hoen	Thomas W. Lynch & Bruce Kalish	December 6, 1997
5	5	"Starwalk"	Shawn Levy	Thomas W. Lynch	December 13, 1997
6	6	"The Visit"	Lev L. Spiro	Larry Levy	December 27, 1997
7	7	"Battle"	Victor DuBois	Arthur Sellers (?)	January 3, 1998
8	8	"The Guardian"	Diane Wynter	John May & Suzanne Bolch	January 10, 1998
9	9	"Collision"	Allison Liddi	Suzanne Bolch & John May	January 17, 1998
10	10	"Compute"	Lev L. Spiro	Lawrence H. Levy	January 24, 1998
11	11	"Rescue"	Christopher Coppola	Robin Riordan	February 21, 1998
12	12	"Home, Part 1"	Paul Hoen	(Story by: Thomas W. Lynch)	February 24, 1998
13	13	"Home, Part 2"	Paul Hoen	John May & Suzanne Bolch & Bruce Kalish	February 26, 1998

=== Season 2 (1998–1999) ===
No. overall	No. in season	Title	Directed by	Written by	Original release date
14	1	"Passage"	Shawn Levy	Thomas W. Lynch	August 31, 1998
15	2	"The Day of the Beagle"	Topper Carew	Suzanne Bolch & John May	September 2, 1998
16	3	"Haunted"	Paul Hoen	Lawrence H. Levy	September 7, 1998
17	4	"Pride of the Dolphin"	Paul Hoen	John Slama	September 9, 1998
18	5	"Strange Culture"	Joe Rasullo	Story by : Thomas W. Lynch; Teleplay by : Robin Riordan & Arthur Sellers	September 14, 1998
19	6	"Two for the Road"	Patrick Williams	John May & Suzanne Bolch	September 16, 1998
20	7	"The Broken Puzzle"	Allison Liddi	Lawrence H. Levy	September 23, 1998
21	8	"Portal, Part 1"	Jason Marsden	Story by : Thomas W. Lynch & Mark Palmer; Teleplay by : Mark Palmer	September 28, 1998
22	9	"Portal, Part 2"	Lev L. Spiro	John May & Suzanne Bolch	September 30, 1998
23	10	"The Truth About Lies"	Topper Carew	Arthur Sellers	October 5, 1998
24	11	"A Room of My Own"	Gilbert Shilton	Robin Riordan & Arthur Sellers	October 12, 1998
25	12	"Cash Crunch"	Paul Hoen	Robin Riordan & Arthur Sellers	October 21, 1998
26	13	"Father and Son"	Lev L. Spiro	(Story by: Thomas W. Lynch)	November 4, 1998
27	14	"A New Leaf"	Allison Liddi	Suzanne Bolch & John May	November 23, 1998
28	15	"Secret of the Deep"	Susan Youngman	John May & Suzanne Bolch	November 30, 1998
29	16	"Dances with Moose"	Topper Carew	Story by : Karen Russell; Teleplay by : Bruce Halish	December 2, 1998
30	17	"Baby on Board"	Allison Liddi	Thomas W. Lynch & Arthur Sellers	December 14, 1998
31	18	"Eye of a Stranger"	Allison Swan	Eugene Lee	February 8, 1999
32	19	"Unmasked!"	Lev L. Spiro	Suzanne Bolch & John May	March 10, 1999
33	20	"Fast Friends"	Allison Liddi	David Pitlick & Barry Gurstein	March 17, 1999
34	21	"Space Bugs"	Lev L. Spiro	Robin Riordan	March 24, 1999
35	22	"All Apologies"	Allison Liddi	Story by : Robin Riordan; Teleplay by : John May & Suzanne Bolch	March 31, 1999
36	23	"Strike Out"	Lev L. Spiro	Suzanne Bolch & John May	April 7, 1999
37	24	"Down the Tube"	Paul Hoen	Jean Gennis & Phyllis Murphy	April 14, 1999
38	25	"Bust a Move"	Lev L. Spiro	John May & Suzanne Bolch	April 21, 1999
39	26	"Shadows in the Sky"	Allison Liddi	Story by : Thomas W. Lynch & David Rosenberg; Teleplay by : David Rosenberg	April 28, 1999

=== Season 3 (1999–2000) ===
No. overall	No. in season	Title	Directed by	Written by	Original release date
40	1	"First Day of School"	Paul Hoen	Jean Gennis & Phyllis Murphy	December 5, 1999
41	2	"Split Decision"	Paul Hoen	Lance Whinery	December 12, 1999
42	3	"Mother and Child Reunion"	Allison Liddi	Mindy Morgenstern & Terry Maloney Haley	December 19, 1999
43	4	"Twist of Fate"	Paul Hoen	Thomas W. Lynch	December 26, 1999
44	5	"As the Millennium Turns"	Allison Liddi	Mindy Morgenstern & Terry Maloney Haley & Lance Whinery	December 31, 1999
45	6	"A Day at the Races"	Allison Liddi	Catherine Stribling	January 2, 2000
46	7	"Hamilton's Missing"	Paul Hoen	Thomas W. Lynch & Kathryn Baker	January 9, 2000
47	8	"Science Friction"	Paul Hoen	Kathryn Baker	January 16, 2000
48	9	"Blue-Up"	Lev L. Spiro	Lance Whinery	January 23, 2000
49	10	"Out on a Limb"	Shawn Levy	Terry Maloney Haley & Mindy Morgenstern	January 30, 2000
50	11	"A Burp in Time"	Lev L. Spiro	Kathryn Baker	February 6, 2000
51	12	"Love Stinks"	Allison Liddi	Mindy Morgenstern & Terry Maloney Haley	February 13, 2000
52	13	"Allen on TV"	Robert Duncan McNeill	Jean Gennis & Phyllis Murphy	February 20, 2000
53	14	"Out to Lunch"	Paul Hoen	Jean Gennis & Phyllis Murphy	February 27, 2000
54	15	"Bringing Up Baby"	Sturrt Hreisman	Chris Cluess	March 5, 2000
55	16	"Heroes"	Shawn Levy	Jean Gennis & Phyllis Murphy	April 9, 2000
56	17	"Life of the Party"	Paul Hoen	Anthony Cipriano	April 16, 2000
57	18	"Message from Beyond"	Lev L. Spiro	Terry Maloney Haley & Mindy Morgenstern & Lance Whinery	April 23, 2000

== Book series ==
A nine-book series, based on the episodes, was also printed, written by several authors, including John Vornholt and Mel Odom. A list of these books is available at the Internet Speculative Fiction Database.
