= Johnathon Schaech =

American actor (born 1969)

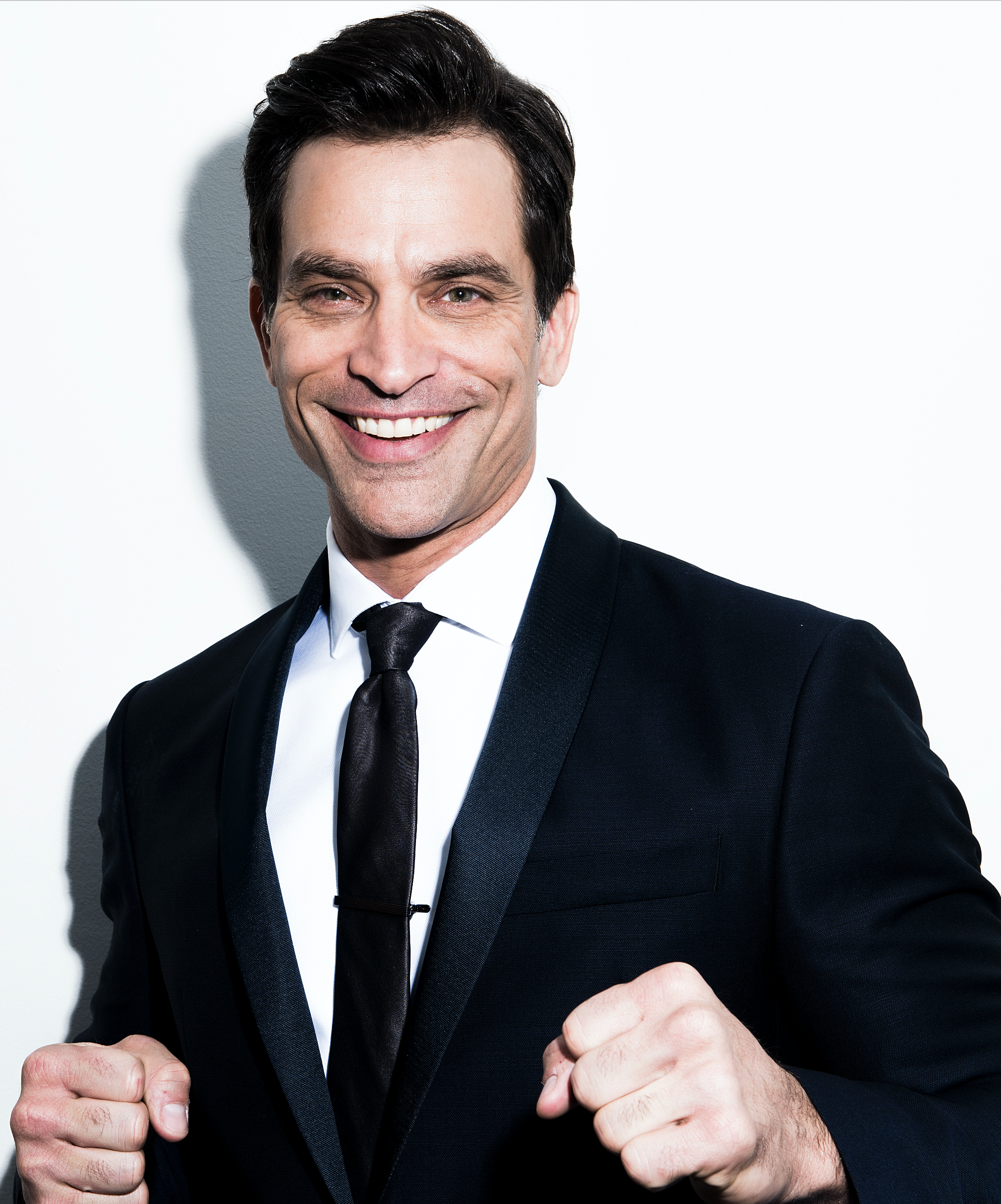
- Schaech in 2014
- Born: September 10, 1969 (age 57); Edgewood, Maryland, U.S.
- Education: University of Maryland, Baltimore County
- Occupations: Actor; writer; producer
- Years active: 1991–present
- Spouses: Christina Applegate (m. 2001; div. 2007); Jana Kramer (m. 2010; div. 2011); Julie Solomon (m. 2013)
- Children: 2

Johnathon Schaech (pronounced /ʃɛk/; born September 10, 1969) is an American actor and screenwriter. He first gained recognition for his role in How to Make an American Quilt (1995). His other films include The Doom Generation (1995), That Thing You Do! (1996), Hush (1998), Prom Night (2008), Phantom (2013), Marauders (2016), and The Night Clerk (2020).

On television, Schaech's work include as Harry Houdini in Houdini (1998), Time of Your Life (1999–2000), and Colonel Sidney Sherman in Texas Rising (2015). He also played the DC Comics gunslinger Jonah Hex in DC's Legends of Tomorrow (2016–2018) and Batwoman. As of 2025, he stars as the sheriff in the TV series Blue Ridge (2024), reprising his role from the 2020 film of the same name.

== Early life ==
Johnathon Schaech was born in Edgewood, Maryland, in 1969 to Joseph, a Baltimore City law enforcement officer, and Joanne Schaech, a human resources executive. He is Catholic. He has a sister, Renée.

Schaech graduated from the University of Maryland, Baltimore County, where he studied economics and took one acting class.

== Career ==
In 1989, Schaech signed with Wilhelmina West, Inc., and worked for three years doing commercials and bit parts in movies. He studied under acting teacher Roy London for three and half years until London's death in 1993.

In 1993, Schaech played the lead role in Franco Zeffirelli's period drama Sparrow (Italian: Storia di una capinera). Schaech then played drifter Xavier Red in the Gregg Araki film The Doom Generation. In 1995, Schaech's character Leon romanced Winona Ryder's character Finn in How to Make an American Quilt. It was nominated for a Screen Actors Guild Award for Outstanding Performance by a Cast in a Motion Picture and was something of a break-out role for him. In 1996, Schaech played the ambitious but self-absorbed lead singer of the Wonders in Tom Hanks' That Thing You Do!. Schaech next starred in the 1998 thriller Hush, which "promptly bombed".

Also in 1996, he was on the cover of Vanity Fair's annual "Hollywood" issue. The Baltimore Sun said in 1998 that he "has been labeled a hot, young heartthrob to watch."

In 1997, Schaech starred in the Australian comedy Welcome to Woop Woop directed by Stephan Elliott. Playing a British military man, Schaech was in the independent feature Woundings in 1998, for which he won Best Supporting Actor at the 2001 New York International Independent Film & Video Festival. In 1998, Schaech portrayed Harry Houdini in TNT's Houdini. Schaech received praise not only for a convincing dramatic portrayal, but for learning and performing all the magic tricks and stunts himself. In 1999, Schaech appeared with Harvey Keitel in Finding Graceland and in 1999, Schaech reunited with Araki in Splendor, which premiered at the 1999 Sundance Film Festival. In 1999, he played the love interest of Jennifer Love Hewitt in the Party of Five spin-off, Time of Your Life. In 2000, Schaech performed in his first major play, David Rabe's A Question for Mercy, playing a Colombian-born gay Manhattanite dying of AIDS. He lost 35 pounds (16 kg) for the role. In 2000, Schaech played a small part in the comedy How To Kill Your Neighbor's Dog.

In 2002, he played Seattle cop and detective named Daniel Pruitt in the movie Blood Crime. In 2004, Schaech played the title character in the ABC television film Judas. In 2005, he co-starred with his then-wife Christina Applegate, in Suzanne's Diary for Nicholas for CBS. In 2006, Schaech starred in Little Chenier. The film won best picture and best ensemble at the Phoenix film festival. In 2006, he co-starred opposite Heather Locklear in the Lifetime television film Angels Fall. In 2007, Schaech was nominated for an MTV award for best villain for his performance in Sony's remake of Prom Night. In 2009, Schaech played Captain Rezo Avaliani in the Renny Harlin directed war film 5 Days of War. In 2009, Schaech guest-starred in a Cold Case episode, playing Julian Bellows, a light-skinned black man who was passing as white to live a better life.

=== Later career ===
Schaech said in 2011, "I was famous more for being around people who were famous, and I hate that kind of fame." In 2013, he played a Soviet political officer in the submarine thriller Phantom. He appeared in five episodes of the first season of the Showtime series Ray Donovan as an eccentric movie star, Sean Walker, and played the Egyptian mercenary Tarak in The Legend of Hercules, gaining 30 pounds (14 kg) of muscle for the role. In 2014, Schaech played Colonel Sherman in the miniseries Texas Rising.

Between 2016 and 2018, Schaech appeared in the first three seasons of the television series Legends of Tomorrow as the DC Comics bounty hunter Jonah Hex. He returned in 2019 to reprise the role in the crossover event Crisis on Infinite Earths. In 2016, Schaech shot the heist movie Marauders, playing a possibly corrupt cop whose wife is dying of cancer. The film made it to Netflix's U.S. platform's top two in December 2020. In 2018, Schaech appeared in noir crime drama The Night Clerk opposite Ana de Armas. In 2018, Schaech starred opposite Frank Grillo in the action flick Reprisal. Years after its release, the film made Netflix's US platform's top five in October 2021.

Schaech played Marshall Hitchcock opposite Jason Scott Lee in The Wind & the Reckoning, a Hawaiian Western historical drama film released in November 2022. In 2022, he played cult leader Chisos in Frank and Penelope written and directed by Sean Patrick Flanery.

Schaech plays Sheriff Justin Wise in the 2020 crime drama Blue Ridge and the follow-up 2024 TV series of the same name. Schaech is part of the cast of Greyhound 2, an upcoming Apple original film sequel to the 2020 war film Greyhound.

== Writing ==
Schaech has co-written several screenplays with Richard Chizmar, including Heroes (2002), Road House 2 (Sony Pictures Home Entertainment, 2006), based on a story by Miles Chapman, Masters of Horror: The Washingtonians (Showtime, 2007), based on a story by Bentley Little, and The Poker Club, based on the story by Ed Gorman. They have also co-written screenplays based on stories by Peter Crowther (Fear Itself: Eater, NBC/AXN Sci-Fi, 2009), Lewis Shiner (Fear Itself: The Circle, NBC/AXN Sci-Fi, 2009) and Stephen King (From A Buick 8 and Black House, both in production 2009).

Schaech's book, Rick Dempsey's Caught Stealing: Unbelievable Stories From a Lifetime of Baseball, was published in 2014.

== Personal life ==
During the mid-1990s, Schaech often accompanied actress Ellen DeGeneres, who had not yet come out as a lesbian, to public events. Schaech was scheduled to appear in the 1997 episode of Ellen in which DeGeneres's character also came out as gay, but could not participate in the filming.

Schaech married actress Christina Applegate in October 2001. In December 2005, he filed for a divorce, citing irreconcilable differences. The divorce was finalized in August of 2007.

Schaech married Jana Kramer on July 4, 2010, seven months after announcing their engagement. The couple announced their separation one month later. Their divorce was finalized in June 2011.

In 2013, Schaech spoke on Capitol Hill about the importance of arts education.

Schaech has been married to Julie Solomon since July 2013. They have a son born in September 2013, and a daughter born in July 2020. Schaech has stated that he stopped drinking alcohol after meeting her, having tried to attain sobriety several times before.

In 2018, People published Schaech's first-person account of having been sexually assaulted by film director Franco Zeffirelli during the filming of Sparrow in 1993. Schaech wrote that the assault affected his confidence and caused trauma that led to his addictions to sex, drugs, and alcohol.

Schaech took part in the 2019 Rape, Abuse & Incest National Network PSA, "Won't Stay Quiet", as a survivor of sexual violence.

== Filmography ==
=== Film ===
Year	Title	Role	Notes
1993	Sparrow	Nino	
1995	How to Make an American Quilt	Leon	
1995	The Doom Generation	Xavier Red	
1996	Poison Ivy II: Lily	Gredin	Direct-to-video
1996	That Thing You Do!	Jimmy Mattingly II	
1996	Invasion of Privacy	Josh Taylor	
1997	Welcome to Woop Woop	Teddy	
1998	Hush	Jackson Baring	
1998	Finding Graceland	Byron Gruman	
1998	Brand New World	Douglas Briggs	
1999	Splendor	Abel	
2000	If You Only Knew	Parker Concorde	
2000	The Giving Tree	James	
2000	After Sex	Matt	
2000	How to Kill Your Neighbor's Dog	Adam	
2001	Sol Goode	"Happy"	
2001	The Forsaken	Kit	
2002	The Sweetest Thing	Leather Coat Guy	Uncredited
2002	Heroes	Francis	Also writer
2002	Kiss the Bride	Geoff Brancati	
2005	8mm 2	David Huxley	Direct-to-video
2006	Sea of Dreams	Marcelo	
2006	Road House 2	Shane Tanner	Direct-to-video; also writer
2006	Little Chenier	Beauxregard "Beaux" Dupuis	
2008	Prom Night	Richard Fenton	
2008	Quarantine	Fletcher	
2008	The Poker Club	Aaron Tyler	Also writer
2009	Laid to Rest	Johnny	Direct-to-video
2010	Takers	Scott	
2011	5 Days of War	Rezo Avaliani	
2013	Phantom	Pavlov	
2013	Dark Circles	Alex	Direct-to-video
2014	The Legend of Hercules	Tarek	
2014	Flight 7500	Pete Haining	
2014	The Prince	Frank	Direct-to-video
2015	Vice	Chris	Direct-to-video
2016	Marauders	Mims	Direct-to-video
2017	Arsenal	Mikey	Direct-to-video
2017	Jackals	Andrew Powell	
2017	Butterfly Caught	Brandon Banks	
2017	Acts of Vengeance	Lustiger	
2017	Day of the Dead: Bloodline	Max	
2018	Reprisal	Gabriel	Direct-to-video
2018	Hellbent	Matt Caruso	
2020	The Night Clerk	Nick Perretti	
2020	Blue Ridge	Justin Wise	
2022	Frank and Penelope	Chisos	
2022	The Wind & the Reckoning	Edward Griffin Hitchcock	
2023	Suitable Flesh	Edward	
TBA	Quiet in My Town	Reid	Post-production
TBA	Greyhound 2		Filming

=== Television ===
Year	Title	Role	Notes
1993	At Home with the Webbers	Giampaolo	TV movie
1994	The Adventures of Brisco County, Jr.	Nevada Cooper	Episode: "Bounty Hunters' Convention"
1994	Models Inc.	Frank Thompson	Recurring role
1995	Fallen Angels	Garth Cary	Episode: "Love and Blood"
1998	Houdini	Harry Houdini	TV movie
1999	The Last Witness	David J. McMillan	TV movie
1999	Partners	Michael Spivak	Episode: "Pilot"
1999	Time of Your Life	John Maguire	Main role
2001	The Outer Limits	Andy Pace	Episode: "Alien Shop"
2002	They Shoot Divas, Don't They?	Trevor	TV movie
2002	Blood Crime	Daniel Pruitt	TV movie
2004	Mummy an' the Armadillo	Jesse	TV movie
2004	Judas	Judas Iscariot	TV movie
2005	Suzanne's Diary for Nicholas	Matt Harrison	TV movie
2007	Masters of Horror	Mike Franks	Also writer; episode: "The Washingtonians"
2007	Angels Fall	Brody	TV movie
2008	Living Hell	Frank Sears	TV movie
2009	Cold Case	Julian Bellows	Episode: "Libertyville"
2009	Fear Itself	—N/a	Writer; episodes: "Eater", "The Circle", "From A Buick 8", "Black House"
2011	Drop Dead Diva	Aaron Howard	Episode: "Change of Heart"
2011	CSI: Miami	Joseph Crumbaugh	Episode: "By the Book"
2013	Ray Donovan	Sean Walker	Recurring role (season 1)
2013	The Client List	Greg Carlisle	Recurring role (season 2)
2014	Star-Crossed	Castor	Recurring role
2015	Sleepy Hollow	Solomon Kent	Episode: "Spellcaster"
2015	Texas Rising	Sidney Sherman	Miniseries
2015	Quantico	Michael Parrish	2 episodes
2015	To Appomattox	Simon Buckner	Miniseries
2016; 2018	Legends of Tomorrow	Jonah Hex	3 episodes
2016	Blue Bloods	Jimmy Mosley	Episode: "Blast from the Past"
2016	Impastor	Kurt	2 episodes
2018	Chicago P.D.	Detective Scott Hart	Episode: "Sisterhood"
2019	Now Apocalypse	Voyeur Neighbor	4 episodes
2019	Batwoman	Jonah Hex	Episode: "Crisis on Infinite Earths, Part 2"
2021	Creepshow	Dalton	Episode: "Stranger Sings / Meter Reader"
2024	Blue Ridge: The Series	Justin Wise	Main role

== Awards and nominations ==
Year	Award	Category	Nominated work	Result
2007	Phoenix Film Festival Awards	Best Ensemble Acting	Little Chenier	Won
2009	MTV Movie & TV Awards	Best Villain	Prom Night	Nominated
