= Michael Jackson impersonator =

Michael Jackson tribute acts

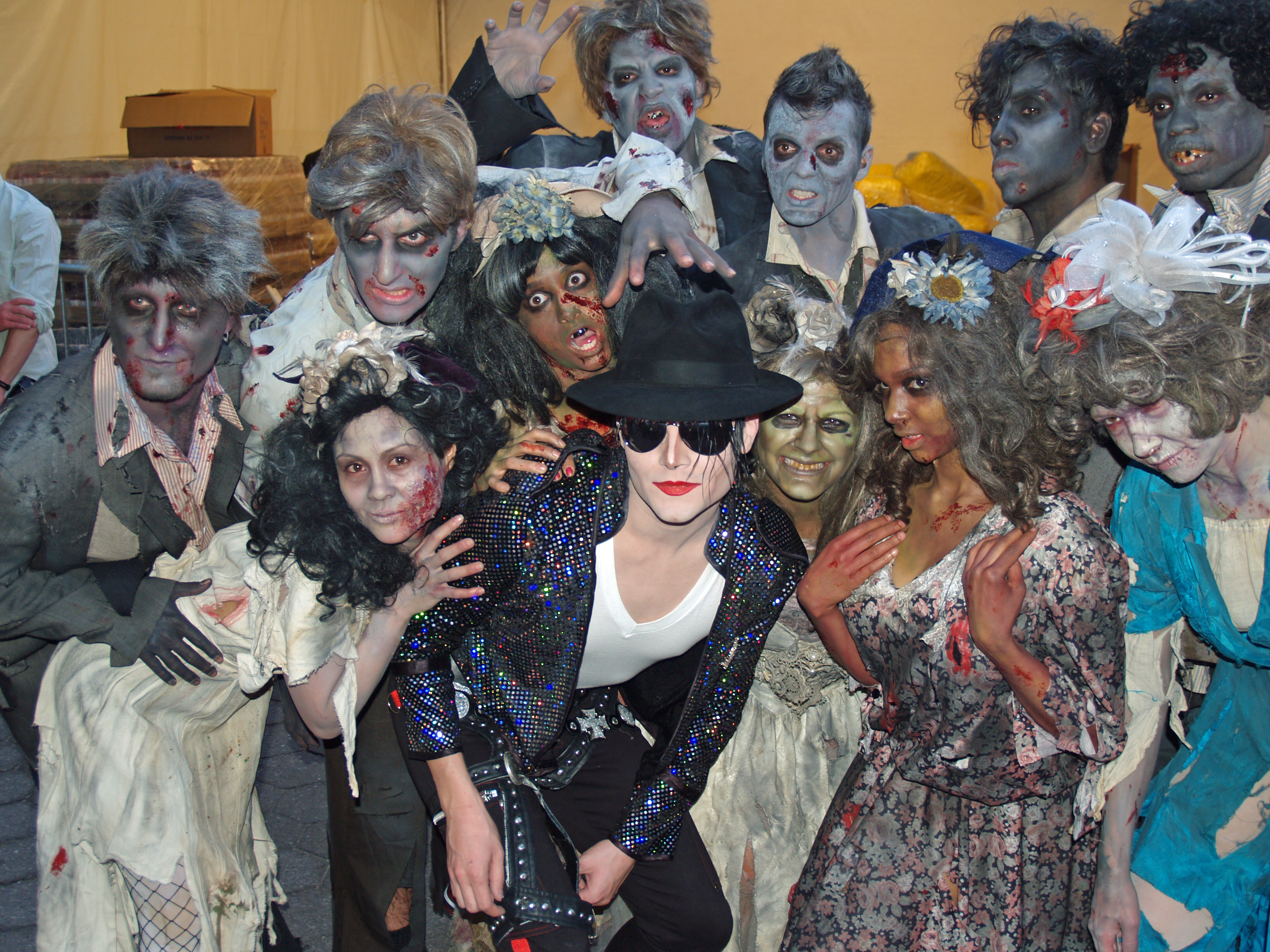
A Michael Jackson impersonator for the 25th anniversary of the album Thriller at the 2008 Tribeca Film Festival with performers from Step It Up and Dance

Impersonators of American entertainer Michael Jackson work all over the world as entertainers, and such tribute acts remain in great demand due to the enduring popularity of Jackson.

== In the media ==
=== Films ===
- Maanthrikam, a 1995 Malayalam action comedy film, includes a scene in which actor Vinayakan (in his film debut) dances in a 'weak imitation' of Jackson.
- Mister Lonely is a 2007 British-French-Irish-American comedy-drama film directed by Harmony Korine and co-written with his brother Avi Korine. It's a story of a young man living in Paris scratches out a living as a Jackson look-alike, starring Diego Luna as Jackson and dancing on the streets, public parks, tourist spots and trade shows.

=== Television ===
- Move Like Michael Jackson was a British talent show made by independent production company Fever Media and Gogglebox Entertainment and transmitted on BBC Three, which aimed to find people who can dance like Jackson.
- Impersonator Edward Moss portrayed Jackson in re-enactments of his 2005 trial on charges of child molestation which were broadcast daily on E! and Sky UK.
- In 2011 on the television program "Qual é Seu Talento" (What is Your Talent) by the Brazilian broadcaster Sistema Brasileiro de Televisão, the Brazilian covers Jean Walker and Ricardo Walker played the King of Pop in the entire contest. In the performances, Jean Walker sang while Ricardo Walker danced. Jean Walker has a very similar timbre to Michael Jackson, while Ricardo Walker is an excellent dancer and works as a dance teacher on his project.

=== Literature ===
In January 2014, Lorena Turner, who teaches photography in the Communication Department at California State Polytechnic University, has spent four years tracking down 35 artists and look-alikes of Jackson. She released a new book of photos, essays and stories of men and women from across the U.S. who pretend to be Jackson for a living.

=== Live events ===
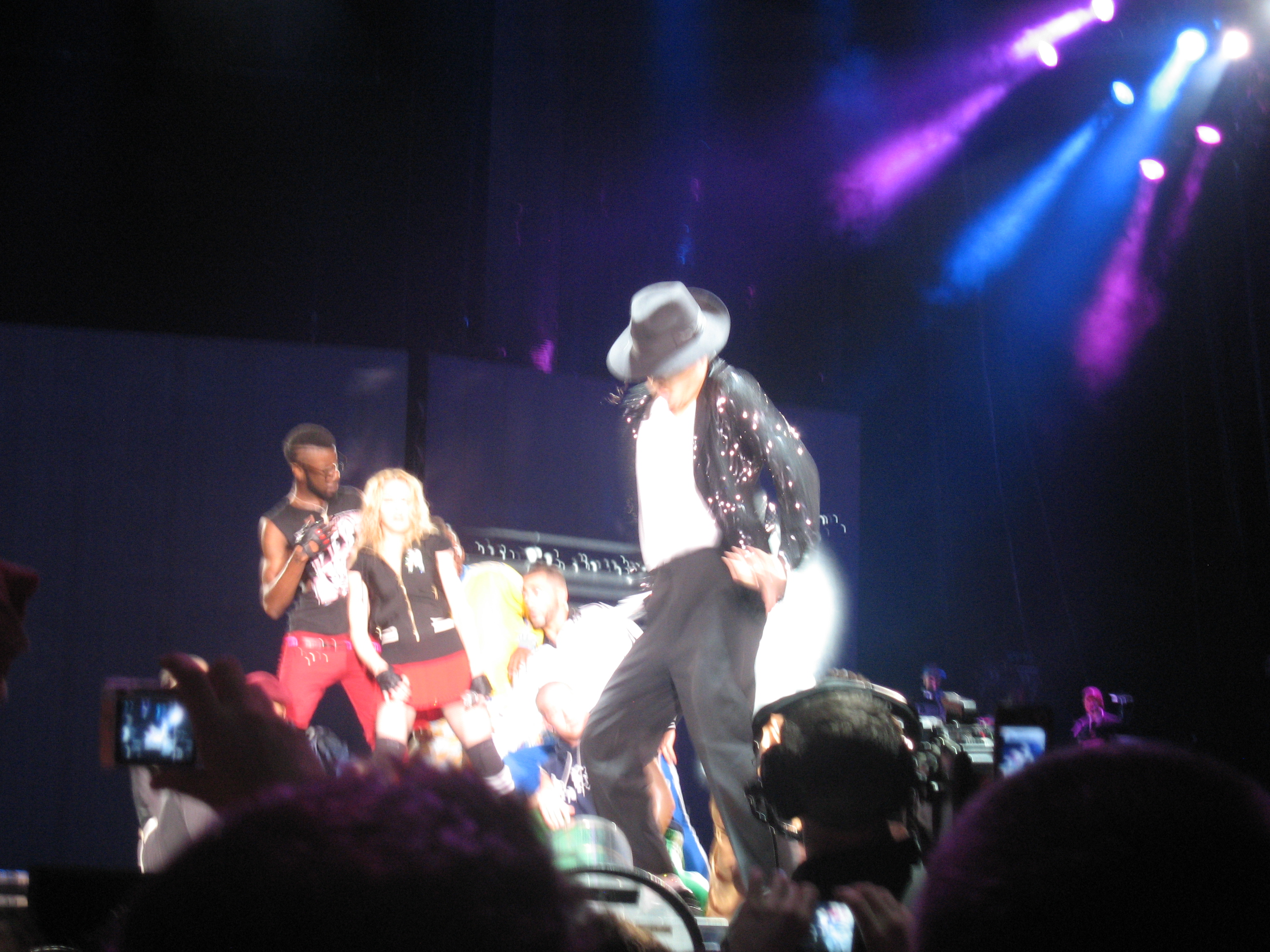
Jackson's impersonator during the Sticky & Sweet Tour of Madonna

- In July 2009, singer Madonna paid a tribute during the second leg of her Sticky & Sweet Tour. A Jackson impersonator performed his signature moves, while dancing to a medley of Jackson's songs.
- Thriller – Live is a two-and-a-half-hour concert celebrating the music of Jackson. It had already been performed in the United Kingdom, Germany, Netherlands, and Scandinavia before opening at the Lyric Theatre, London on 2 January 2009. The show was conceived by Jackson family friend and author, Adrian Grant.

=== Tribute Shows ===
Show	Duration	Tickets Sold	Format	Region
Superstar Reflections	1987–1992	2,500,000	Concert	Europe
Michael Starring Ben	2008–present	1,000,000	Theatre	Worldwide
Thriller Live	2009–2020	4,500,000	Revue	Worldwide
The Michael Jackson History show	2009–Present	1,000,000	Concert	Worldwide
Forever King of Pop	2010–present	1,000,000	Concert	Europe
Michael Jackson: Immortal World Tour	2011–2014	3,700,000	Cirque De Solei	Worldwide
MJ Live	2012–present	2,500,000	Concert	United States
Michael Jackson One	2013–present	5,500,000	Cirque De Solei	United States
Michael Lives Forever	2017–present	1,000,000	Concert	Worldwide
I Am King: The Michael Jackson Experience	2019–present	2,000,000	Concert	Worldwide
MJ The Musical	2019–present	7,000,000	Broadway Musical	North America, Europe
This is Michael	2020-present	500,000	Concert	North America, Europe

== List of notable impersonators ==
- Edward Moss
- Navi Charles
- Suleman Mirza
- Flex Alexander
- Michael Trapson
- E’casanova

== See also ==
- Elvis impersonator
- Madonna impersonator
- Tom Jones impersonator
- Janet Jackson
