= Erin Dean =

American actress (born 1980)

- Born: Erin Jane Dean; October 18, 1980 (age 46); Kennewick, Washington, U.S.
- Occupation: Actress
- Years active: 1993–2000

Erin Jane Dean (born October 18, 1980) is an American actress. She is best known for her lead role as Robbie Stevenson in the television series The Journey of Allen Strange. She has also appeared as the lead actress in Lovers Lane, and in a supporting role as Mona in Lolita. On television, she has appeared in episodes of Boy Meets World, A Pig's Tale, Monty, Against the Grain, and Nickelodeon's game show Figure It Out.

== Filmography ==
Year	Title	Role	Notes
1993	Against the Grain	Clare	Episode: "The Buck Stops...There"
1994	Monty	Lisa Erickson	Episode: "The Son Also Rises"
1994	A Pig's Tale	Heather	
1995	Boy Meets World	Veronica Watson	Episode: "The Double Lie"
1995	Blackbird Hall	Tyler	
1997	Lolita	Mona	
1999	Lovers Lane	Harriet Anderson/Mandy Anderson	
1997-2000	The Journey of Allen Strange	Roberta "Robbie" Stevenson	Main Role
