= Imaginary (film) =

2024 film by Jeff Wadlow

- Theatrical release poster
- Directed by: Jeff Wadlow
- Written by: Jeff Wadlow; Greg Erb; Jason Oremland
- Produced by: Jeff Wadlow; Jason Blum
- Starring: DeWanda Wise; Tom Payne; Taegen Burns; Pyper Braun; Verónica Falcón
- Cinematography: James McMillan
- Edited by: Sean Albertson
- Music by: Sparks & Shadows
- Production companies: Blumhouse Productions; Tower of Babble
- Distributed by: Lionsgate
- Release date: March 8, 2024
- Running time: 104 minutes
- Country: United States
- Language: English
- Budget: $10–13 million
- Box office: $43.8 million

Imaginary is a 2024 American supernatural horror film directed and produced by Jeff Wadlow and written by Wadlow and the writing team of Greg Erb and Jason Oremland. It stars DeWanda Wise, Tom Payne, Taegen Burns, Pyper Braun, and Verónica Falcón. In the film, a woman returns to her childhood home and discovers her stepdaughter's imaginary friend is more than imaginary. Imaginary was released in the United States by Lionsgate on March 8, 2024. It received generally negative reviews from critics and grossed $43 million against a $10–13 million budget.

== Plot ==
Children's book author Jessica is married to divorced musician Max. Max has two daughters from his first marriage: younger daughter Alice, and teenager Taylor. Jessica is plagued by nightmares that include her mentally ill father Ben and a fictional character from her books, Simon the spider. When the family moves into Jessica's childhood home, Alice discovers a teddy bear named Chauncey and forms a bond with him. An elderly neighbor, Gloria, who babysat Jessica when she was a child, shares memories of Jessica's childhood that she cannot remember.

Max leaves for a tour and Chauncey begins to disturb Jessica. One day, Taylor invites over a friend, Liam, who is toyed with by Chauncey; the teddy briefly turns into a monstrous bear. Jessica narrowly stops Alice from slamming her hand down onto a nail, prompting her to call child psychologist Dr. Soto. She discovers that only she and Alice can see the stuffed bear. Soto shows her footage of a past patient who used the same phrase as Alice: "Never Ever". Alice disappears, for which Taylor blames her stepmother.

Gloria tells Taylor that Chauncey was also Jessica's childhood imaginary friend and explains that imaginary friends are actually spirits who tether to the young and can become sinister if abandoned. Jessica goes through her old belongings and finds drawings of Chauncey and "The Never Ever", which is, in fact, the otherworldly realm that connects all imaginary friends. Jessica, Gloria and Taylor complete Chauncey's scavenger hunt together, resulting in a glowing door leading to The Never Ever.

Here, they find Jessica's repressed memories. As a child, she was lured by Chauncey into the Never Ever. Ben rescued her, but was driven mad after seeing Chauncey's eyes, resulting in Jessica being sent to live with her grandparents. Gloria closes the escape route, having become obsessed with the realm. She reveals to the horrified family that she had been in contact with Chauncey who has promised her the power of the Never Ever if she brought them there, but is then mauled to death by Chauncey in the midst of her insane rant. Throughout their search for Alice in The Never Ever, Chauncey stalks and torments them constantly until they successfully locate and rescue Alice. Jessica stops Chauncey in the midst of his pursuit by stabbing him in the eye with scissors.

After reuniting with Ben and Max at Ben's institution, Jessica realizes she is still stuck in The Never Ever. Chauncey used Alice as bait to get to her and seeks revenge for her abandoning him. Taylor saves her and Chauncey transforms into his true form akin to Simon, chasing them to the doorway. The spider attempts to drive them insane with his eyes, but Alice sets the creature on fire and seals him behind the door. The family escapes as the house burns to the ground.

The family checks into a hotel but are frightened by a child playing with a teddy bear. They leave for another hotel for their safety. As the child argues with his mother about his imaginary friend, it is shown that the bear looks like Chauncey.

== Cast ==
- DeWanda Wise as Jessica, Max's wife, Taylor and Alice's stepmother
- Tom Payne as Max, Jessica's husband and Taylor and Alice's father, who is a musician
- Taegen Burns as Taylor, Max's older daughter, Jessica's older stepdaughter and Alice's older sister
- Pyper Braun as Alice, Max's younger daughter, Jessica's younger stepdaughter and Taylor's younger sister
- Matthew Sato as Liam, Taylor's friend and neighbor
- Samuel Salary as Ben, Jessica's father
- Verónica Falcón as Dr. Alana Soto, a therapist
- Betty Buckley as Gloria, Jessica's neighbor and former babysitter from her childhood
- Dane DiLiegro as Chauncey Bear, Jessica and Alice's imaginary friend
- Michael Bekemeier as the entity and humanoid spider

== Production ==
In February 2023, Deadline Hollywood reported that Lionsgate acquired worldwide rights to the Blumhouse horror film, Imaginary. The film was to be directed by Jeff Wadlow, who had co-written the screenplay with Greg Erb and Jason Oremland. On a production budget of $10–$12 million, principal photography took place in New Orleans from May to late June 2023.

== Release ==
Universal Pictures has first-look deals on Blumhouse titles but passed on releasing Imaginary. Blumhouse shopped the film around where Lionsgate secured a distribution deal. It was released theatrically on March 8, 2024, after being pushed back from its original date of February 2, 2024.

== Reception ==
=== Box office ===
Imaginary grossed $28 million in the United States and Canada and $15.7 million in other territories, for a worldwide total of $43.7 million.

In the United States and Canada, Imaginary was released alongside Kung Fu Panda 4 and Cabrini, and was projected to gross $10–14 million from 3,118 theaters in its opening weekend. The film made $3.6 million on its first day, including $725,000 from Thursday night previews. It went on to debut to $9.9 million, finishing fifth at the box office. The film made $5.6 million in its second weekend, finishing in fourth.

=== Critical response ===
On the review aggregator website Rotten Tomatoes, 25% of 106 critics' reviews are positive. The website's consensus reads: "Imaginary's core concept is solid enough to produce a handful of scares, but too much of its potential is lost in a clichéd story that gets bogged down in world-building." Metacritic, which uses a weighted average, assigned the film a score of 34 out of 100, based on 21 critics, indicating "generally unfavorable" reviews. Audiences surveyed by CinemaScore gave the film an average grade of "C+" on an A+ to F scale, while those polled by PostTrak gave it an 57% overall positive score.

Variety's Owen Gleiberman called it "a watchable mess of a child's-play fright flick, exemplifies the trend of overwrought too-muchness" and also wrote "despite a few creepy moments, [the film] is starved for scenes that make the fear it's showing you relatable". Frank Scheck of The Hollywood Reporter praised Wise's and the younger's cast performances, but wrote "Imaginary, which starts out as a relatively low-key suspenser with intriguing psychological depth, eventually succumbs to the inanities plaguing so many recent horror efforts (like the killer pool in the same company's Night Swim)".

Wilson Chapman of IndieWire gave the film a grade of "C", writing "Even at its most entertaining, Imaginary has about as much staying power as the figments of imagination that give it its name. Just like your childhood imaginary friend, you'll probably forget about it pretty quickly". Robert Abele writing for the Los Angeles Times criticized director Wadlow with being "terrible with actors", saying that he "can even make a motionless plush animal seem poorly directed". He wrote, "Imaginary skips the directive to entertain, coming off as stiff, pedestrian and dreary as a March space-filler can get".
