= Michael Jackson: Searching for Neverland =

2017 American biographical TV film

- Genre: Biographical film
- Based on: Remember the Time: Protecting Michael Jackson in His Final Days by Bill Whitfield and Javon Beard
- Written by: Elizabeth Hunter
- Directed by: Dianne Houston
- Starring: Chad L. Coleman; Sam Adegoke; Nondumiso Temble; Starletta DuPois; Richard Lawson; Holly Robinson Peete; Navi
- Composer: Zach Ryan
- Country of origin: United States

Production
- Executive producer: Suzanne De Passe
- Producers: Kyle A. Clerk; Lina Wong
- Cinematography: Tommy Maddox-Upshaw
- Editor: Craig Hayes
- Production companies: Lifetime; Silver Screen Pictures

Original release
- Network: Lifetime
- Release: May 30, 2017

Michael Jackson: Searching for Neverland is a 2017 American biographical television film directed by Dianne Houston, based on the 2014 book, Remember the Time: Protecting Michael Jackson in His Final Days, written by Michael Jackson's personal bodyguards Bill Whitfield and Javon Beard.

== Synopsis ==
The film dramatizes Jackson in the final years of his life, told from the point of view of one of his bodyguards, Bill Whitfield. At the time, Jackson was living in Las Vegas and he was trying to live a life as normal as possible, always prioritizing his children's safety.

== Cast ==
- Chad L. Coleman as Bill Whitfield
- Sam Adegoke as Javon Beard
- Nondumiso Temble as Grace Rwaramba
- Starletta DuPois as Katherine Jackson
- Richard Lawson as Joe Jackson
- Aidan Hanlon Smith as Prince Jackson
- Taegen Burns as Paris Jackson
- Michael Mourra as Blanket Jackson
- Holly Robinson Peete as Raymone Bain (Note: Robinson Peete also portrayed Diana Ross in The Jacksons: An American Dream.)
- Navi as Michael Jackson
- Isabella Hofmann as Green
- Vincent M. Ward as Jeff Adams
- Ken Colquitt as Conrad Murray
- Kristofer Gordon as Randy Jackson
- Mykel Shannon Jenkins as Michael Amir Williams
- Tasia Sherel as Auntie Gloria

Additionally, an uncredited Jermaine Jackson appears through archive footage.

== Development ==
On January 13, 2017, Lifetime announced that it had ordered a television biopic of Michael Jackson, which would be based on the book Remember the Time: Protecting Michael Jackson in His Final Days by Bill Whitfield and Javon Beard. Production was scheduled to begin in February in Los Angeles.

== Reception ==
On its premiere airing, the film was watched by 2 million viewers.

Spencer Kornhaber, a critic working for The Atlantic, wrote "They seem earnest in their avowals to do right by Jackson, and [it] is indeed a gentle portrayal... Searching for Neverland mourns the exploitation of him in his final years; its very existence also, necessarily, exploits his final years." Michael Arceneaux, a critic working for The Root, wrote "While Jackson’s spirit may not be pleased with anyone telling his story without explicit permission—much less on basic cable—this flick was surprisingly not terrible."

At the 10th Annual Make-Up Artists & Hair Stylists Guild Awards, the film was nominated in the Television Mini-Series or Motion Picture Made for Television section for the Best Contemporary Makeup and Best Contemporary Hair Styling categories, but it lost both to Big Little Lies.
