= Navi (impersonator) =

Michael Jackson tribute artist (born 1976)

Navi Charles
- Born: February 4, 1976 (age 50); Trinidad and Tobago
- Genres: Pop
- Occupation: Performer · actor · impersonator
- Years active: 1988–present
- Website: www.kingofpop.co.uk

Navi (born February 4, 1976) is a Trinidadian-born Michael Jackson tribute artist and actor based in England.

Navi starred as Jackson in Michael Jackson: Searching for Neverland, a 2017 American television biopic.

== Early life ==
Navi was born on February 4, 1976, in Trinidad and Tobago. He moved with his family to London where he took a liking to pop music, including Michael Jackson, Elvis Presley, Bob Marley etc.

== Career ==
In 1992, after seeing him perform, Jackson began hiring the young impersonator on several occasions as a decoy, and for the promotion of world tours and albums such as HIStory: Past, Present and Future, Book I, Invincible and Thriller 25.

=== 2003 ===
In 2003, Michael Jackson invited Navi to perform at his 45th birthday concert at the Orpheum Theatre in Los Angeles, to which Navi agreed. He performed at the venue in front of an audience of 2,000 fans, with Jackson in attendance, performing Jam, Billie Jean and Thriller. At the end of his impersonation of Smooth Criminal, delighted by his rendition, Jackson went on to give him a standing ovation and thumbs up.

=== 2009 ===
In 2009, following the death of Michael Jackson, Navi was invited to attend the UK premiere of Michael Jackson's This Is It in London's Leicester Square. Navi created his own Michael Jackson tribute concert, King of Pop – The Legend Continues, starring himself, backed by a 4-piece live band and 4 dancers.

=== 2016 ===
In 2016, for his The Legend Continues tour, Navi was joined on stage by Jennifer Batten. Batten was lead guitarist for Michael Jackson on three world tours, including the Bad Tour, the Dangerous World Tour and the HIStory World Tour, as well as the Super Bowl XXVII halftime show.

== Acting debut ==
In late 2016, Navi was cast in the starring role of Michael Jackson in the Lifetime/Silver Screen Pictures film, Michael Jackson: Searching for Neverland, his acting debut. The biopic was executive produced by Suzanne de Passe, former President of Motown Productions. Shooting began in January 2017 on location in Los Angeles.
