= Hush (1998 film) =

- Theatrical release poster
- Directed by: Jonathan Darby
- Screenplay by: Jonathan Darby; Helen Whitfield
- Story by: Jonathan Darby
- Produced by: Douglas Wick
- Starring: Jessica Lange; Gwyneth Paltrow; Johnathon Schaech; Nina Foch; Hal Holbrook
- Cinematography: Andrew Dunn
- Edited by: Dan Rae; Lynzee Klingman; Robert Leighton
- Music by: Christopher Young
- Production companies: TriStar Pictures; Red Wagon Entertainment
- Distributed by: Sony Pictures Releasing
- Release date: March 6, 1998
- Running time: 96 minutes
- Country: United States
- Language: English
- Budget: $21 million
- Box office: $13.6 million

Hush is a 1998 American thriller film starring Jessica Lange, Gwyneth Paltrow and Johnathon Schaech. The film was directed by Jonathan Darby (in his feature directorial debut) and written by Darby and Helen Whitfield. The plot follows newlyweds Helen and Jackson Baring, who move to the family thoroughbred horse ranch to support Jackson's mother, Martha, during Helen's pregnancy. However, Martha's hostile behaviour towards Helen soon raises suspicions.

The film was released on March 6, 1998, to critical and commercial failure.

== Plot ==
A couple, Helen and Jackson Baring, lives together in New York City. The two drive to the Kentucky farmhouse, Kilronan, where Jackson grew up, primarily to introduce Helen to Jackson's mother, Martha, during the Christmas holidays. They arrive late in the evening and go straight to bed. The next morning Helen awakens to Martha arranging the room. During their stay, Martha tries to convince Jackson to stay to help her run the farm. Martha cleans their room and arranges their things every day, including Helen's contraceptive.

After returning to New York in the new year, Helen discovers that she is pregnant. When she informs Jackson of this, he asks her to marry him and she accepts. The wedding is held at Kilronan.

After it, they return to New York. One night after work, Helen is assaulted by a burglar who steals her locket and makes sexual advances. When Helen says that she is pregnant, he cuts her abdomen and leaves. The fetus is not injured.

Martha arrives unannounced, saying that she wants to sell Kilronan because she cannot run it alone. Helen tells Jackson she wants to move to Kentucky and in with Martha for a year and help renovate the land. Jackson reveals that his father Jack died in Kilronan when he was seven; Jackson blames himself because he ran into Jack, pushing him down the stairs to his death. Jackson adds that Jack had been cheating on Martha with a woman named Robin Hayes. Helen says that they should return to Kilronan so Jackson can face his "old ghosts".

The couple move in with Martha, who attempts to divide them with subversive comments and manipulating the family friends and neighbors. Helen goes to the doctor and discovers that Martha told him Helen wanted to have the baby at Kilronan, even though Helen had never said that. Suspicious and annoyed, Helen talks to Jackson's paternal grandmother Alice, who says that Jackson is not responsible for Jack's death. When Jack fell, his sternum was supposedly crushed by the nail puller that he fell onto at the bottom of the stairs; this was a freak accident. Helen returns that evening and finds Jackson calling around asking for her whereabouts with Martha hovering nearby. Helen's frigid attitude toward her mother-in-law prompts Martha to visit Alice and warn her to stay away from them.

Tired of Martha's manipulations, Helen tells Jackson that Martha is tearing their marriage apart. He agrees to return to New York and tells Martha, who appears to accept it gracefully. Martha is convinced the baby will be a boy, and that Helen is a bad influence on Jackson and the baby.

Jackson leaves the farm on a work call, leaving Helen and Martha alone. That evening, Martha bakes a strawberry cheesecake for Helen laced with pitocin, a labor inducer. Helen wakes up the next morning, feeling strange. She discovers a baby room set up by Martha and finds her stolen locket amongst the baby clothes. When Martha unexpectedly enters the room, Helen tries unsuccessfully to escape, driving to a neighboring farm and coming face to face with her attacker from New York, a neighbor of Martha's, then attempting to escape on foot before Martha captures her at the side of the highway.

Reluctantly, Helen gives birth at the house, with Martha offering assistance, but refusing to give Helen painkillers. Martha leaves the room to answer a call from Jackson. She tells him that everything is okay, but when Helen screams in pain, Martha hangs up.

Helen eventually gives birth to a healthy boy. She begs Martha to hand her the baby, but Martha ignores her, telling the baby she is his mother. Martha tries to inject a needle full of morphine in Helen's arm, but Helen knocks the syringe away. After retrieving it, Martha hears Jackson's footsteps in the house. She quickly cleans up, meeting Jackson at the door with the baby. She tells him to leave Helen alone, as he has no idea what she has been through. The two leave Helen asleep, and Martha gives the baby to Jackson.

That night, Martha enters Helen's bedroom with the syringe, but finds Jackson awake in a chair next to the bed. Despite Martha's insistence that Jackson return to bed, he stays, thereby thwarting her plan. The next morning, Helen awakens near Jackson and the baby. Helen holds her child and tells Jackson to ask Martha to make breakfast for them.

At breakfast, Helen enters the house with the nail puller that killed Jack in her bag. She then proceeds to tell Jackson the truth about Jack's death, revealing that Martha was actually the one having an affair with Robin Hayes, who was a male horse wrangler and not a woman as Jackson had been told by Martha. Jack discovered the affair and decided to leave Martha, who staged the 'accident' to get rid of him and tricked Jackson into believing that he was responsible for it to control him for the rest of his life. Helen shows Jackson a bruise from Martha's attempt to murder her so she could have him and their son to herself. Martha denies everything and says that Helen cannot prove anything. However, Jackson by now has remembered that Martha was pulling nails off the shed on the day Jack died, and thus realized the truth of Helen's words. Furious and outraged, Jackson disowns Martha from their lives, severs all ties with her, and announces the sale of Kilronan and its contents. Enraged, Martha attempts to persuade Jackson that Helen is coming between them out of jealousy, claiming that Helen wants to be her. Helen shuts Martha up by slapping her to the ground, and she and Jackson then leave the house with their baby, while a defeated Martha breaks down sobbing on the floor. The couple later visit Alice before they leave for good, presenting her with her great-grandson.

== Cast ==
- Jessica Lange as Martha Baring
- Gwyneth Paltrow as Helen Baring
- Johnathon Schaech as Jackson Baring
- Nina Foch as Alice Baring
- Debi Mazar as Lisa
- Richard Lineback as Hal Bentall
- Hal Holbrook as Dr. Franklin Hill
- Kaiulani Lee as Sister O'Shaughnessy
- David Thornton as Gavin

== Production ==
The film was made between April and June 1996, but test screening reactions were negative. Actors were brought back for re-shoots. The trailer contains many shots not seen in the finished film.

== Soundtrack ==
Intrada released a limited edition album of Christopher Young's score on November 12, 2012.

1. Hush (18:32)
2. Little Baby (4:41)
3. Don't (7:56)
4. You (3:43)
5. Cry (5:39)
6. Mama's Gonna (10:36)
7. Buy You (4:44)
8. A (4:37)
9. Hush (Concert Suite) (15:01)

== Reception ==
Hush holds a 12% approval rating on review aggregator Rotten Tomatoes, based on 41 reviews with an average rating of 3.5/10. The site's consensus states: "A ridiculous but wholly predictable potboiler with performances ranging from comatose to hysterical." Metacritic, which uses a weighted average, gave the film a score of 18/100, based on 14 critics, indicating "overwhelming dislike". Audiences polled by CinemaScore gave the film an average grade of "B−" on an A+ to F scale.

Roger Ebert has been quoted as saying that Hush is "the kind of movie where you walk in, watch the first 10 minutes, know exactly where it's going, and hope devoutly that you're wrong. It's one of those Devouring Woman movies where the villainess never plays a scene without a drink and a cigarette, and the hero is inattentive to the victim to the point of dementia."

Jessica Lange earned a Golden Raspberry Award nomination for Worst Actress, losing to the Spice Girls for Spice World.
