= Lovers Lane (2000 film) =

2000 film by Jon Steven Ward

- Directed by: Jon Steven Ward
- Written by: Geof Miller; Rory Veal
- Produced by: Geof Miller; Rory Veal
- Starring: Erin Dean; Riley Smith; Sarah Lancaster; Anna Faris; Matt Riedy; Suzanne Bouchard; Richard Sanders
- Cinematography: Lon Magdich
- Edited by: John Dagnen
- Music by: B. C. Smith
- Production companies: Iris Entertainment; Seattle Pacific Investments
- Distributed by: First Look Studios; Showcase Entertainment
- Release date: February 5, 2000 (Bainbridge Island Film Festival)
- Running time: 90 minutes
- Country: United States
- Language: English
- Budget: $500,000

Lovers Lane (also known as I'm Still Waiting for You) is a 2000 American slasher film directed by Jon Steven Ward, written by Geof Miller and Rory Veal, and starring Erin Dean, Riley Smith, Sarah Lancaster, Anna Faris (in her feature film debut), Matt Riedy with Suzanne Bouchard and Richard Sanders. The film is based on the urban legend of The Hook, and follows a group of teenagers who are terrorized by an escaped mental patient in and around lovers' lane.

Independently produced and shot in Seattle, Washington, it premiered at the Bainbridge Island Film Festival on February 5, 2000, and was later released on video.

== Plot ==
On Valentine's Day at a lovers' lane, Dee-Dee and Jimmy have sex in their car when Ray Hennessey, a man wielding a steel hook, attacks them. The pair escape the car and find another couple, Harriet and Ward, slaughtered in the car next to theirs. Psychiatrist Jack Grefe later arrives, along with Sheriff Tom Anderson, Harriet's husband. Ray was one of Jack's patients and had an obsession with Harriet. Ray is caught and incarcerated in a state institution for the criminally insane and gains the nickname "The Hook".

Thirteen years later, Jack is called into his daughter Chloe's high school about her recent actions. There, he meets with Principal Penny Lamson, who is Ward's widow and the mother of Micheal, Chloe's boyfriend. Chloe is suspended from the school, while Michael is grounded by Penny. Meanwhile, "The Hook" retrieves his weapon and escapes the mental institution.

Later that night, Michael sneaks out of his room to meet his friends, including Chloe, Tom's daughter Mandy, Bradley, cheerleader Janelle, joker Doug, and couple Cathy and Tim at the bowling alley. Also there is Deputy David Schwick, whom Sheriff Tom has put in charge of keeping Chloe and Mandy safe. Chloe, in an attempt to make Michael jealous, leaves with Bradley to go to lovers lane. As the pair travel in their car, Chloe enters a store, not realising that the owner is murdered as she departs. Deputy David also enters the shop, only to be killed as well. Meanwhile, Penny discovers that Michael is missing from his bedroom and alerts Sheriff Tom.

Meanwhile, Mandy, Michael, Janelle, Doug, Cathy and Tim arrive at lovers lane. The group find Bradley's car, only to discover that he and Chloe have been murdered, before the Hook arrives and stabs Tim to death. As the others try to escape in their car, Doug crashes into a tree, knocking everyone unconscious. After waking up, Mandy and Michael find the others gone. They travel to a nearby farmhouse and arm themselves with a gun before finding Janelle and Doug, who has broken his leg. While Janelle tends to Doug's injury, Mandy and Michael enter the barn to retrieve the missing owners' car. Back inside, Janelle begins to hear noises before the Hook smashes through a window. Janelle runs upstairs and barricades herself in a room, but the Hook gets in and slaughters her. The Hook then kills Doug.

In the barn, Michael and Mandy get the car started. As Michael begins to drive, he accidentally runs over Cathy, killing her. The pair re-enter the house and find Doug and Janelle dead before the Hook attacks them. They lock themselves in the kitchen, and turn the gas on, before escaping out a window. As the Hook opens the door, a match is sparked and the house blows up. Sheriff Tom and Penny go to Jack's house and find a shrine devoted to Mandy, before rushing to lovers lane. At the farmhouse, Michael and Mandy take the owners' car and begin to travel into town. En route, they find Chloe still alive, who urges them to return to lovers lane as Bradley has also survived. Upon arrival, Mandy leaves Michael and Chloe in the car, only to find that Bradley is actually dead, before she is dragged away into a bush. In the car, Chloe attacks Michael with her own hook, for dumping her and also revealing that she was the one who killed Janelle and Doug. Michael elbows her and escapes, but as Chloe exits she is slaughtered by the killer.

Mandy is forced into a car by her attacker, revealed to be Jack who says that he was Harriet's killer, and had survived the explosion at the farmhouse. Michael saves Mandy, and as a fight breaks out, Tom and Penny arrive and shoot Jack before he is killed by Mandy with his own hook.

The next day, at lovers lane, Mandy and Michael are medically checked before they leave. The young couple enter a police car, that is revealed to be driven by Ray, "The Hook".

== Cast ==
- Erin Dean as Mandy Anderson/Harriet Anderson
  - Jori Wanquist as Young Mandy Anderson
- Riley Smith as Michael Lamson
- Sarah Lancaster as Chloe Grefe
- Anna Faris as Jannelle Bay
- Billy O'Sullivan as Doug
- Matt Riedy as Sheriff Tom Anderson
- Suzanne Bouchard as Principal Penny Lamson
- Richard Sanders as Dr. Jack Grefe
- Megan Hunt as Cathy
- Collin F. Peacock as Tim
- Ben Indra as Bradley
- Michael Shapiro as Deputy David Schwick
- Ed Bailey as Ray Hennessey/The Hook
- Diedre Kilgore as Dee-Dee
- Carter Roy as Jimmy

== Production ==
Geof Miller and Rory Veal started writing the film's screenplay in 1997. The film was produced independently for $500,000. It was shot on location in Seattle, Washington. For Sarah Lancaster's nude scene, a stripper from Portland, Oregon was hired as a body double. A costumer from Portland was also employed to design Anna Faris's cheerleading outfit.

== Release ==
The film was shown at the Bainbridge Island Film Festival on February 5, 2000. It also got accepted in the Slamdance Film Festival. Lovers Lane was released direct-to-video in 2000. According to the film's Blu-ray commentary track, it made back its entire budget after a deal was signed with Blockbuster.

== Reception ==
Jon Condit from Dread Central stated, "Down a few cold ones and enjoy a return to simpler times. Back when little things like scripts, budgets, and knowing winks were not required." Greg Muskewitz of eFilmCritic.com called Lovers Lane a "cheap, cheesy ripoff of I Know What You Did Last Summer", and panned it for low grade production values.

== Home media ==
Planet Entertainment released the film on directly to DVD on October 30, 2000. First Look Studios released a new DVD on July 16, 2002. Seville Pictures and Warner Bros. released a DVD edition in Canada in 2000.

Arrow Films released a special edition Blu-ray of the film on April 25, 2023, licensed by MGM Home Entertainment.

International rights to the film are currently held by SC Global Media.

== Sources ==
- Harper, Jim (2004). Legacy of Blood: A Comprehensive Guide to Slasher Movies. Critical Vision. ISBN 978-1-900-48639-2.
- Miller, Geof; Veal, Rory (2023). Lovers Lane (Blu-ray audio commentary). Arrow Films; MGM Home Entertainment. OCLC 1371935238.
