= Sarah Lancaster =

American actress (born 1980)

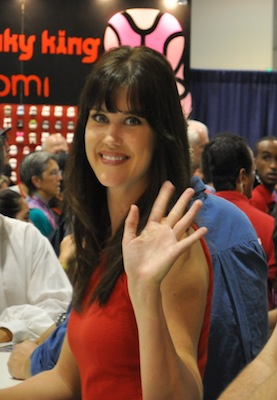
- Lancaster in 2010
- Born: February 12, 1980 (age 46); Overland Park, Kansas, U.S.
- Occupation: Actress
- Years active: 1993–present
- Spouse: Matthew Jacobs (m. 2011)
- Children: 2

Sarah Lancaster (born February 12, 1980) is an American actress and director. She is known for her long-running roles as Rachel Meyers in the series Saved by the Bell: The New Class and Ellie Bartowski in the comedy-spy series Chuck, as well as playing Chloe Grefe in Lovers Lane, Madison Kellner on Everwood, and Marjorie in the television drama What About Brian. In 2020, Lancaster starred as Elli Wise in the television film Blue Ridge, later reprising the role in the family crime drama series Blue Ridge (2024), which premiered on INSP and was later released on Amazon Prime Video.

== Early life and career ==
Born in Overland Park, Kansas, Lancaster has appeared on Sabrina, the Teenage Witch, Dawson's Creek, That '70s Show, Scrubs, and CSI: Crime Scene Investigation. She also landed two recurring roles: on The WB series Everwood as Ephram's love interest Madison Kellner; and on David E. Kelley's FOX series Boston Public. In 2005 she starred in the TV movie Living With the Enemy. Most notably, she appeared as Ellie Bartowski Woodcomb on the NBC series Chuck from 2007 to 2012.

Lancaster has also worked as a jealous girlfriend-turned-serial killer in the movie Lovers Lane, and as the blackjack dealer, Veronica Harold, on CBS's short-lived Dr. Vegas.

In 2019, Lancaster made her directorial debut with the film Josie & Jack, based on Kelly Braffet's 2005 novel of the same name. Lancaster and Braffet collaborated to adapt the screenplay.

In 2019, Lancaster starred as Elli Wise in the television film Blue Ridge, which premiered on INSP. The film was later adapted into a television series of the same name, in which she reprised her role. The first season of the series debuted on INSP before becoming available on Amazon Prime Video, where it became a sleeper hit, ranking in the service’s Top 10 most-watched shows. The series returned again in 2026 for a second season, with Lancaster starring again as Elli Wise.

== Personal life ==
Lancaster is married to attorney Matthew Jacobs. She gave birth to their first son in June 2011, and to their second son in January 2017.

== Filmography ==
=== Film ===
Year	Title	Role	Notes
2000	Lovers Lane	Chloe Grefe	
2000	Teacher's Pet	Tracy Carley	
2001	Cruel Intentions 2	Millicent Davies	Direct-to-video film; scenes deleted
2002	Catch Me If You Can	Riverbend Woman	
2008	Smother	Holly	
2011	The Good Doctor	Christine	
2014	The Judge	Lisa Palmer	
2015	Christmas in the Smokies	Shelby Haygood	
2017	The Terror of Hallow's Eve	Linda	
2017	The Stray	Michelle Davis	
2018	Christmas on Holly Lane	Sarah	
2020	Blue Ridge	Elli Wise	

=== Television ===
Year	Title	Role	Notes
1993–1996	Saved by the Bell: The New Class	Rachel Meyers	Guest role (season 1); main role (seasons 2–4)
1997	Unhappily Ever After	Alice	Episode: "B-Minus Blues"
1997	Sabrina, the Teenage Witch	Jean	Episode: "Dante's Inferno"
1997	Night Man	Gloria	Episode: "In the Still of the Night"
1998	Pacific Blue	Julianne Taylor	Episode: "Best Laid Plans"
1998	Conrad Bloom	Pretty Girl	Episode: "The Spazz Singer"
1999	Michael Landon, the Father I Knew	Leslie Landon	Television film
1999	Undressed	Liz	Main role (season 1)
1999	Sorority	Skylar Sinclair	Television film
2000	Zoe, Duncan, Jack and Jane	Eileen	Episode: "The Customer Is Always Vic"
2000	Dawson's Creek	Shelley	Episode: "Stolen Kisses"
2000	Rocket's Red Glare	Carol	Television film
2001	Straight White Male	Holly	Television film
2001	Dharma & Greg	Wendy	Episode: "Wish We Weren't Here"
2002	Boston Public	Chrissy Fields	Episodes: "Chapter 35", "Chapter 42"
2002	Off Centre	Kendall	Episode: "Love Is a Pain in the A**"
2002	That '70s Show	Melanie	Episode: "Over the Hills and Far Away"
2002	Half & Half	Merce	2 episodes (season 1)
2002–2006	Scrubs	Lisa the Gift Shop Girl	Episodes: "My Monster", "My New Old Friend", "My Urologist"
2003	7th Heaven	Veronica	Episode: "Stand Up"
2003	Six Feet Under	Alternate Daughter	Episode: "Perfect Circles"
2003	CSI: Crime Scene Investigation	Mrs. Mercer	Episode: "Precious Metal"
2003–2005	Everwood	Madison Kellner	Main role (season 2); recurring role (season 3)
2004	Dr. Vegas	Veronica Harold	Main role
2005	Living with the Enemy	Allison Conner Lauder	Television film
2006	Four Kings	Heather	Episode: "One Night Stand Off"
2006–2007	What About Brian	Marjorie Seaver	Main role
2007–2012	Chuck	Ellie Bartowski	Main role
2009	Hawthorne	Courtney	Episode: "No Guts, No Glory"
2013	A Woman Betrayed	Gwen Griffith	Television film; also known as The Preacher's Mistress
2013	Fir Crazy	Elise	Television film; also known as Oh Christmas Tree!
2014	Love Finds You in Sugarcreek	Rachel Troyler	Television film
2014	Looking for Mr. Right	Annie	Television film
2014	Witches of East End	Raven Moreau	Recurring role (season 2)
2014	Along Came a Nanny	Jessie White	Television film
2015	Revenge	April Hunter	Episode: "Retaliation"
2015	Tis the Season for Love	Beth Baker	Television film
2016	Code Black	Julia	Episode: "Sleight of Hand"
2018	Christmas on Holly Lane	Sarah	Television film
2018	Rage Room	Jenny	Episode: "Lover"
2024–present	Blue Ridge	Elli Wise	Main role

== Awards ==
In 1997, Lancaster was nominated with the rest of the cast of Saved by the Bell for Best Performance in a TV Series - Young Ensemble.
