= Blue Ridge (2020 film) =

American crime drama film

- Written by: Caleb G. Brown; Shea Sizemore
- Directed by: Brent Christy
- Starring: Johnathon Schaech; Sarah Lancaster; Ben Esler
- Country of origin: United States
- Original language: English

Production
- Running time: 87 minutes

Original release
- Release: October 20, 2020

Blue Ridge is an American crime drama film, originally released in 2020. The film stars Johnathon Schaech, Sarah Lancaster and Ben Esler.

A number of scenes from the film were shot on location in Rabun County, Georgia. Blue Ridge was initially released on the INSP TV network. The film then was released on streaming platform Vudu.

== Plot ==
The film stars Johnathon Schaech as Justin Wise, who moves to a small Appalachian mountain town and takes up the role of Sheriff in order to be closer to his ex-wife Elli, played by Sarah Lancaster, and his young daughter, Maddie, played by Taegen Burns. The sleepy, small-town atmosphere is quickly disrupted after a high-profile murder takes place. Personal grievances interfere with the case in the Blue Ridge Mountains. Justin Wise and his deputies set out to solve the murder and keep the mountain community from falling into a long-held family feud.

== Cast ==
- Johnathon Schaech as Justin Wise
- Sarah Lancaster as Elli Wise
- Lara Silva as Deputy Becky Dobson
- Ben Esler as Deputy Thompson
- Taegen Burns as Maddie Wise
- Tom Proctor as Jeremiah Wade
- Graham Greene as Cliff McGrath
- Kevin L. Johnson as Lem Keagen

== Television sequel ==
The Blue Ridge TV series aired its first season on the Cowboy Way Channel in April 2024. The series contained many of the same actors (such as Johnathon Schaech as Justin Wise and Sarah Lancaster as Elli wise, and Tegan Burns as Maddie Wise).
