= Edward Moss (impersonator) =

American actor (born 1977)

- Born: July 11, 1977 (age 49); Los Angeles, California, United States
- Other name: Eddie Moss
- Occupations: Impersonator; actor; dancer; comedian
- Years active: 1994–present

Edward Moss (born July 11, 1977), occasionally known as Eddie Moss, is an American actor, dancer, comedian, and Michael Jackson impersonator who has portrayed Jackson in TV and in films.

Moss used to be an employee of McDonald's in the mid-1990s, which was where his co-workers kept telling him that he resembled pop singer Michael Jackson. Moss entered a company talent contest and won; over time Moss decided to focus on doing Jackson exclusively for a living.

== Early life ==
Moss was born and raised in Los Angeles, California, on July 11, 1977. While an employee at McDonald's in the early 1990s, his co-workers took notice of his resemblance to pop singer Michael Jackson. In 1994, Moss entered an employee talent contest impersonating the singer and won the competition. It was at this time that he decided to become a Jackson impersonator professionally.

== Career ==
Moss has stated it only takes him 30–45 minutes to transform himself into Michael Jackson. His impersonation skills have led to work in countries outside of North America including the Philippines, Bahrain, New Zealand, and Japan. In July 2009, Moss went on a world tour with his Tribute to Michael Jackson show. For four years, Moss performed as Jackson at Horizons Casino Hotel in Lake Tahoe. He performed as a Michael Jackson impersonator at Canobie Lake Park in Salem, New Hampshire for many years.

Moss is also the only known Jackson impersonator to have had no plastic surgery to augment his appearance to more resemble the singer. When hired to perform at a venue in Asia, Moss' manager had to have staff act as bodyguards for him as the audience attending had reached mob levels.

In 1996, Moss met Michael Jackson while performing his impressionist act in Hollywood, California. Reportedly, Jackson told Moss, "You look really good." Moss has impersonated Jackson in a number of movies, including the third and fourth Scary Movie films and Date Movie. Moss also appeared as Michael Jackson on E! Entertainment, Sky News, and Sky 1's reenactment of the Michael Jackson Trial.

A number of Jackson's fans reportedly criticised Moss and his performances as making fun of the singer. Moss denies suggestions that he exploits and portrays Jackson in a negative manner.

== Filmography ==
=== Film ===
Year	Film	Role	Notes
2003	Scary Movie 3	MJ Alien	
2005	101 Even Bigger Celebrity Oops	Michael Jackson	TV documentary
2006	Date Movie	Michael Jackson Impersonator	
2006	Scary Movie 4	MJ Alien	
2006	Don't Be Scared	Michael Jackson	
2009	Bamboo Shark	Michael Jackson Impersonator	

=== Television ===
Year	Film	Role	Notes
2000	The Steve Harvey Show	Michael Jackson Impersonator	Episode: "I Believe I Can Lie"
2001	Nikki	Michael Jackson Impersonator	Episode: "I'll Kick Your Ass"
2002	MADtv	Michael Jackson Impersonator	Episode: "8.9"
2003	Nip/Tuck	Mr. Diamond	Episode: "Nanette Badcock"
2005	The Michael Jackson Trial	Michael Jackson	Main Role; 18 episodes

== Awards and nominations ==
Year	Award	Category	Work	Result
1998	Pop 'N Rock For Reel Award	Best Michael Jackson Impersonator	Impersonating Michael Jackson	Won
2005	Best Video Performance Award	Best Michael Jackson Impersonator	Impersonating Michael Jackson	Won
