= Suzanne's Diary for Nicholas =

2001 novel by James Patterson

- First edition cover
- Author: James Patterson
- Publisher: Little, Brown & Co.
- Publication date: July 1, 2001
- ISBN: 0-316-96944-3

Suzanne's Diary for Nicholas is a 2001 novel by American author James Patterson, which argues the importance of balance within one's life. Two interwoven stories are told throughout the novel. The framing story is based on Katie Wilkinson, a New York City book editor, whose relationship with poet Matthew Harrison ends suddenly. During this period, Katie learns about Matt's past through the diary written by Suzanne.

An audiobook narrated by Becky Ann Baker was released in December 2001.

== Background ==
Suzanne's Diary for Nicholas marks Patterson's first attempt in the romance genre. Patterson, a best-selling author, is known for his mystery thriller series featuring detective Alex Cross. Continuing the trend with his novels, Suzanne's Diary for Nicholas has sold millions of copies, proving to be very popular.

Patterson used some of his experience with heartbreak to write Suzanne's Diary for Nicholas. In 1974, Patterson fell in love with Jane Blanchard. After dating for several years, she was diagnosed with a terminal brain tumor. When she died, Patterson devoted his time to writing and stayed away from romantic relationships. Over a decade later, he married Susan, who wrote a diary for their baby son.

== Plot ==
New York City book editor Katie Wilkinson is devastated when her boyfriend, poet Matt Harrison, abruptly breaks up with her for no apparent reason. He later sends her a diary as a means of explaining why he can't be with her, and Katie discovers the diary is written by a woman named Suzanne, who is writing to her newborn son, Nicholas.

Suzanne begins her story in Boston, where she was working as a doctor in a hospital. After she has a heart attack at a young age, her fiancé leaves her, partly because he believes they won't be able to have children due to her health issues. In an effort to start over, she moves to Martha's Vineyard and buys a house that she plans to fix up.

Suzanne meets Matt Harrison, a house painter, at a diner and hires him to paint her house. They fall in love and are married, and soon after have a son, Nicholas. When Suzanne becomes pregnant again, she becomes ill with toxemia and is hospitalized, ultimately losing the baby. With Matt's support, she recovers and writes that she feels lucky to have the life that she does.

Suzanne's diary entries end suddenly after she writes about having pictures of Nicholas, now almost a year old, taken in a professional studio. Matt takes over writing in the diary and expresses immense grief over the loss of his wife, eventually revealing that Suzanne had a heart attack while driving to pick up the photos of Nicholas and crashed the car, killing both Suzanne and Nicholas.

In the present, Katie is devastated by the truth about Matt's past and finally understands that his tremendous grief and guilt is keeping him from moving on with Katie, who he does not know is pregnant by him. She visits Martha's Vineyard and pays her respects at the graves of Suzanne and Nicholas, then finds the house where Matt lived with his wife and son. She encounters an old friend of his, Melanie, who tells Katie that she believes Matt does love her.

Katie returns to New York and begins to conceive of a life as a single mother, but Matt appears outside her office building and begs for forgiveness. They reconcile and happily marry. On her wedding day, Katie recalls Suzanne's words from her diary, "Isn't it lucky?" and remembers to be grateful.

== Characters ==
- Katie Wilkinson is one of the central characters. Katie is a native of North Carolina but lives in New York City, where she works as an editor at a publishing house. Through her work she meets Matt Harrison, a poet whose first book she is working on. The two become involved in an intimate relationship.
- Matthew (Matt) Harrison is a central character. He is Suzanne's husband and Nicholas's father. He later becomes Katie's boyfriend. Matt is a housepainter and handyman in Martha's Vineyard. He also writes poetry.
- Suzanne Bedford Harrison (Christina Applegate) is a central character and the author of the diary. She is married to Matt Harrison and the mother of Nicholas Harrison.
- Nicholas Harrison is the son of Suzanne Bedford and Matthew Harrison.
- Matt Wolfe was Suzanne's boyfriend when they were teenagers. He works as a fine art dealer and a lawyer for the Environmental Protection Agency.
- Michael Bernstein is Suzanne's boyfriend early in her story when she lives in Boston. Like Suzanne, Michael works at a hospital in Boston.
- Melanie Bone is Suzanne's next-door neighbor on Martha's Vineyard. A mother of four daughters, Melanie is Suzanne's friend and confidant during her time on the island.
- Lynn Brown is a friend of Katie. Lynn lives with her husband Phil and their four children on a farm in Westport, Connecticut. Katie babysits for them sometimes.
- Susan Kingsolver is one of Katie's best friends.
- Laurie Raleigh is one of Katie's best friends.
- Mary Jordan is Katie's assistant at the publishing house.
- Dan Anderson is a pediatrician in Boston and Suzanne's old friend.
- Phil Berman is Suzanne's doctor in Boston.
- Constance Cotter (Dr. Cotter) is Suzanne's medical doctor on Martha's Vineyard.
- Gail Davis is Suzanne's cardiologist in Boston.
- Albert K. Sassoon (Dr. Sassoon) is Katie's gynecologist in New York.
- Holly Wilkinson is Katie's mother. She lives with Katie's father in Asheboro, North Carolina and works as a first grade teacher.
- Katie's Father is a minister in North Carolina.
- Jean Harrison is Matt's mother, a widow.

== Film adaptation ==
The novel was adapted for a television movie entitled James Patterson's Suzanne's Diary for Nicholas that aired on CBS on March 27, 2005. Written and directed by Richard Friedenberg, it starred Christina Applegate as Suzanne, Johnathon Schaech as Matt Harrison, and Kathleen Rose Perkins as Katie.
