= Shane Sweet =

American actor

- Born: January 7, 1986 (age 40); Burbank, California, U.S.
- Occupations: Actor, Voice actor
- Years active: 1991–present

Shane Sweet (born January 7, 1986) is an American actor, known for his role as Josh Stevenson on the Nickelodeon series The Journey of Allen Strange. He made several appearances as Seven Wanker on the Fox sitcom Married... with Children, until the character was written out of the series midseason without explanation, and appeared on Figure It Out as a panelist. He is also one of the voice actors for Tim Drake / Robin in the DC Animated Universe. He also appeared on an episode of Star Trek: Enterprise.

== Filmography ==
Year	Title	Role	Notes
2003	Star Trek: Enterprise	Sim-Trip at 17	Episode: "Similitude"
2004	Static Shock	Tim Drake / Robin (voice)	Episode: "Future Shock"
2025	The Twits	Triperot Man (voice)	
