= Receptionist =

Employee who greets guests and occasionally acts as secretary

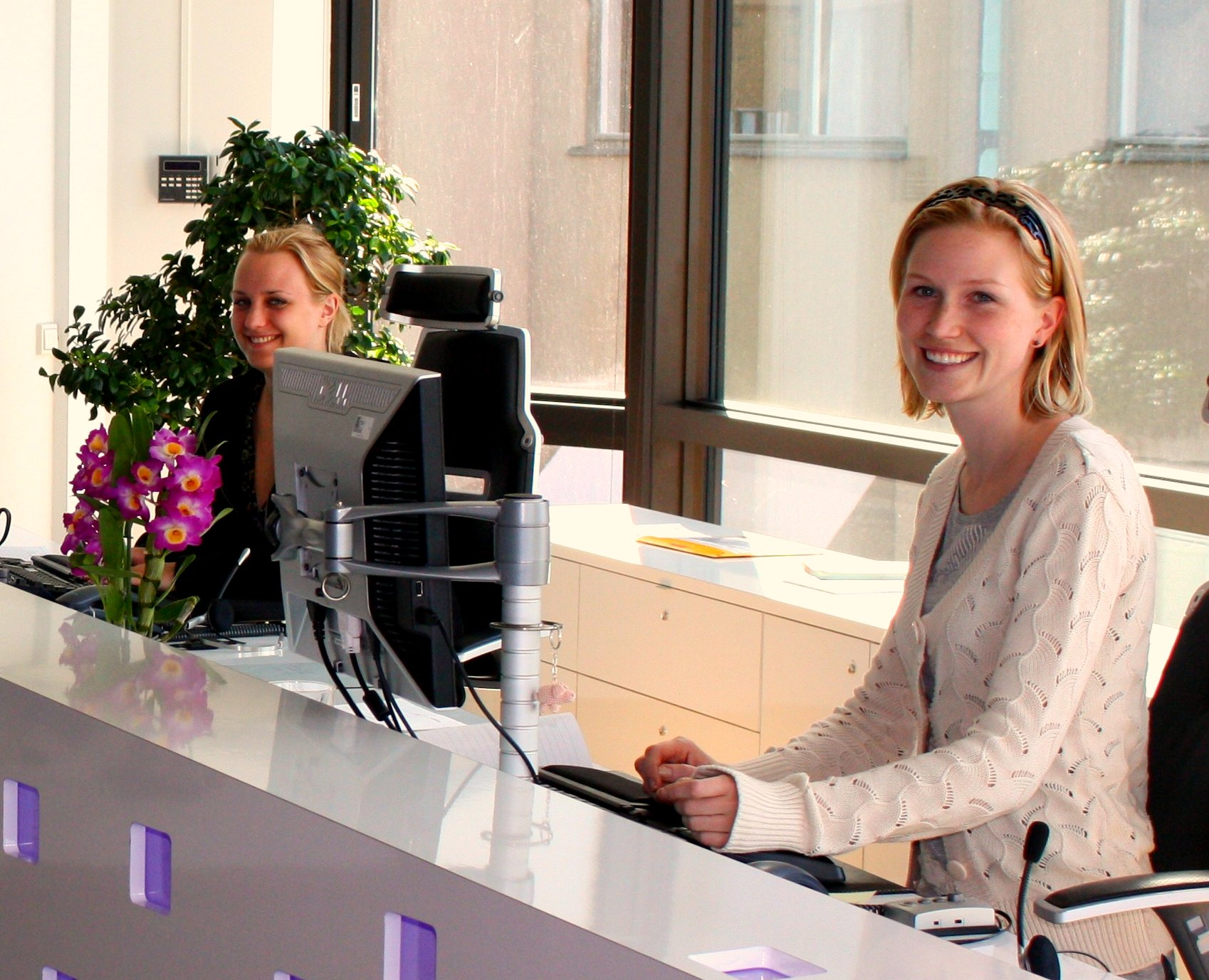
Receptionist of EA DICE in Stockholm, Sweden

A receptionist is an employee taking an office or administrative support position. The work is usually performed in a waiting area such as a lobby or front office desk of an Organization or business. The title receptionist is attributed to the person who is employed by an organization to receive or greet any visitors, patients, or clients and answer telephone calls. The term front desk is used in many hotels for an administrative department where a receptionist's duties also may include room reservations and assignment, guest registration, cashier work, credit checks, key control, and mail and message service. Such receptionists are often called front desk clerks. Receptionists cover many areas of work to assist the businesses they work for, including setting appointments, filing, record keeping, and other office tasks.

== Responsibilities ==
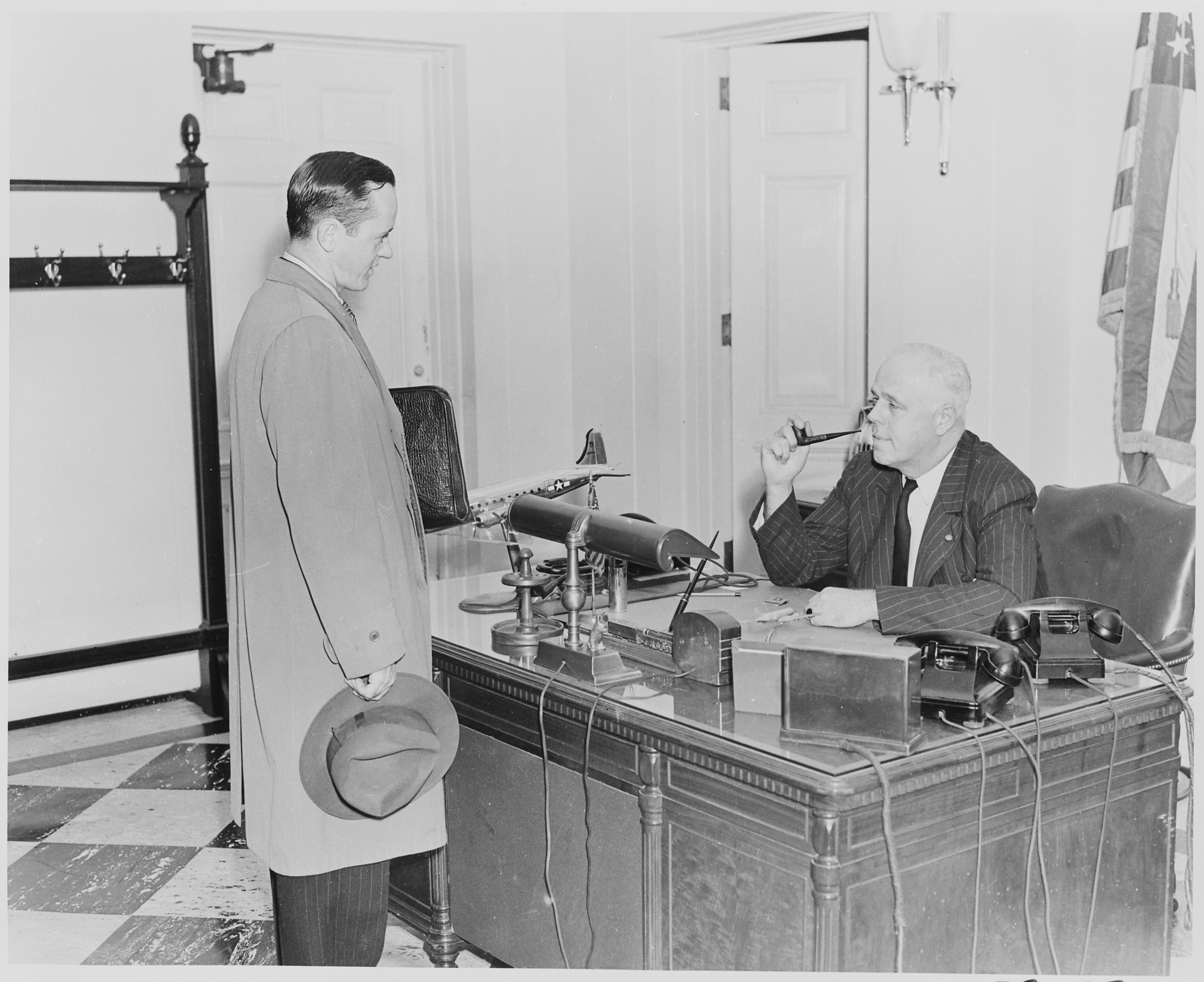
White House receptionist William Simmons at his desk in 1946, conversing with a visitor

The business duties of a receptionist may include answering visitors' enquiries about a company and its products or services, directing visitors to their destinations, sorting and handing out mail, answering incoming calls on multi-line telephones or, earlier in the 20th century, a switchboard, setting appointments, filing, records keeping, keyboarding/data entry and performing a variety of other office tasks, such as faxing or emailing. Some receptionists may also perform bookkeeping or cashiering duties. Some, but not all, offices may expect the receptionist to serve coffee or tea to guests, and to keep the lobby area tidy.

A receptionist may also assume some security guard access control functions for an organization by verifying employee identification, issuing visitor passes, and observing and reporting any unusual or suspicious persons or activities.

A receptionist is often the first business contact a person will meet at any organization. Organizations usually expect that the receptionist maintains a calm, courteous and professional demeanor at all times, regardless of the visitor's behavior. Some personal qualities that a receptionist is expected to possess in order to do the job successfully include attentiveness, a well-groomed appearance, initiative, loyalty, maturity, respect for confidentiality and discretion, a positive attitude and dependability. At times, the job may be stressful due to interaction with many different people with different types of personalities, and being expected to perform multiple tasks quickly.

== Opportunities for advancement ==
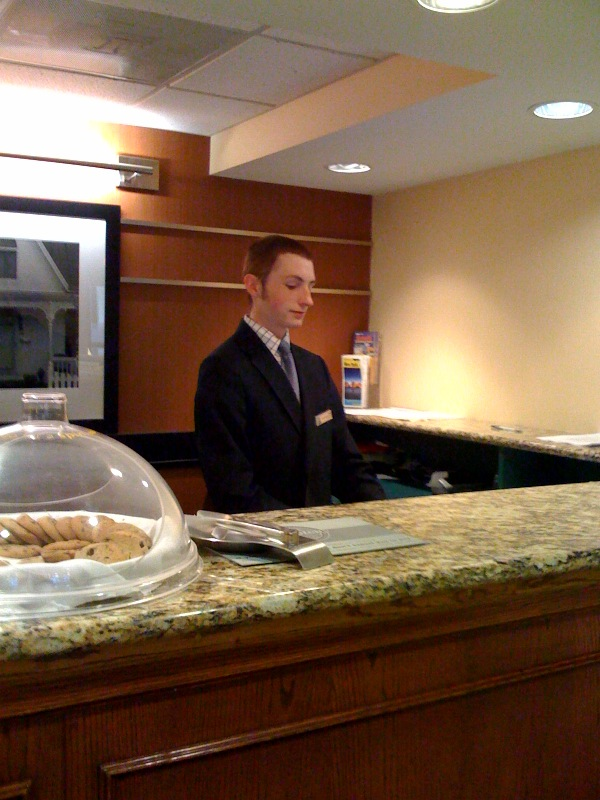
Front desk in a Hampton Inn hotel in New York, USA

Depending on the industry a receptionist position can have opportunities for networking in order to advance to other positions within a specific field. Some people may use this type of job as a way to familiarize themselves with office work, or to learn of other functions or positions within a corporation. Some people use receptionist work as a way to earn money while pursuing further educational opportunities or other career interests such as in the performing arts or as writers.

While many persons working as receptionists continue in that position throughout their careers, some receptionists may advance to other administrative jobs, such as a customer service representative, dispatcher, interviewers, secretary, production assistant, personal assistant, or executive assistant. In smaller businesses, such as a doctor's or a lawyer's office, a receptionist may also be the office manager who is charged with a diversity of middle management level business operations. For example, in the hotel industry, the night-time receptionist's role is almost always combined with performing daily account consolidation and reporting, more particularly known as night auditing.

When receptionists leave the job, they often enter other career fields such as sales and marketing, public relations or other media occupations.

A few famous people were receptionists in the beginning, such as Betty Williams, a co-recipient of the 1976 Nobel Peace Prize. A number of celebrities had worked as receptionists before they became famous, such as singer/songwriter Naomi Judd and Linda McCartney, photographer, entrepreneur and wife of Paul McCartney. Other famous people who began their careers as receptionists or worked in the field include civil rights activist Rosa Parks and former Hewlett-Packard CEO Carly Fiorina.

== Evolution and new technology ==
Some small-to-medium-sized business owners hire a live remote receptionist in lieu of a full-time, in-house receptionist, thanks to advances in communications technology. As the phrase itself suggests, a live remote receptionist deals with phone calls for a company in another location using telephony private branch exchange (PBX) servers. Most modern receptionist services can take messages, screen and forward calls, answer basic FAQs, and fill out web forms. Many services can also schedule appointments and take credit card orders. Some of the older receptionist services have been around for decades, but these often operate very differently from modern services.

Advances in touch screen and 2-way video technology is changing the way some receptionist work. New types of virtual video receptionist systems now allows for live, in-house or remote receptionists to manage office lobby areas from remote locations. These virtual receptionists not only answer phones but also greet walk-in visitors by utilizing a motion detection camera to "see" visitors as they enter the building. The remote receptionist is then displayed in a video window on a wall-mounted LCD, kiosk or desktop all-in-one computer. The video receptionist and visitors can then communicate via 2-way video, allowing the receptionist to manage one or many office lobby areas from a central location.

The advancement of office automation has eliminated some receptionists' jobs. For example, a telephone call could be answered by an automated attendant. However, a receptionist who possesses strong office/technical skills and who is also adept in courtesy, tact and diplomacy is still considered an asset to a company's business image, and is still very much in demand in the business world.

== See also ==
- Secretary
