= Night porter =

Doorperson

A night porter is a porter who is on duty during the night. A hotel commonly has a night porter to attend to the needs of guests and other incidents during the night.

Traditionally a night porter might also be required to perform sundry maintenance and cleaning tasks such as polishing boots, emptying spittoons and laying fires.

== See also ==
- Caretaker
- Concierge
- Receptionist
