= Tasia Sherel =

American actress and model (born 1978)

- Born: July 23, 1978 (age 46); Chicago, Illinois, U.S.
- Occupation(s): Actress, model
- Years active: 2000–present

Tasia Sherel (born July 23, 1978) is an American actress and model, best known for starring as Francis in Showtime TV series Dexter and as Pam in Everybody Hates Chris.

== Biography ==
Sherel was born in 1978 and raised on the south side of Chicago, Illinois.

== Career ==
She then won the prestigious title of Miss Mahogany Chicago and went on to place in the Top 10 of a national pageant. Her biggest break came at the Maybelline Modeling Competition, hosted by the national make-up company of the same name. After winning the competition, she was approached and represented by agent Dee Simmons. She decided to take Simmons advice and began her acting career in New York City.

== Filmography ==
=== Film ===
Year	Title	Role	Notes
2000	Retiring Tatiana	Pretty Party Guest	
2002	Love Relations	Selena	
2004	Billie's	Dr. Simone Sutton	
2006	Let's Talk	Shelly	Short
2007	A Stranger's Heart	Tina	TV movie
2008	Days of Wrath	Tina	
2009	The Good Neighbor Policy	Tanys	
2009	Ice Dreams	Mom #1	TV movie
2009	Betrayal	Frances	Short
2013	CrazySexyCool: The TLC Story	Ava Thomas	TV movie
2015	To Hell and Back	Officer Berry	TV movie
2017	Michael Jackson: Searching for Neverland	Auntie Gloria	TV movie
2017	Burned Out Nurse	Nurse Manager Barbara	Short
2022	Sons 2 the Grave	Karen Bishop	
2022	Amaru	Teresa	Short

=== Television ===
Year	Title	Role	Notes
2002	Meet the Marks	Bachelor Party Guest	Episode: "Episode #1.1"
2003	CSI: Miami	DNA Tech	Episode: "Grave Young Men"
2003	Strong Medicine	Woman	Episode: "Rash Decisions"
2007	What About Brian	Cashier	Episode: "What About the Exes..."
2005–09	Everybody Hates Chris	Pam	Recurring cast: season 1-4
2007–10	Dexter	Francis	Guest: season 2, recurring cast: season 3-5
2015	The Haves and the Have Nots	Jail Clerk	Episode: "Candace Young Esquire"
2016	Conan	Reporter Tamara Walsh	Episode: "Norm Macdonald/Keke Palmer/ZZ Top"
2017	Bosch	Patty	Episode: "The Four Last Things"
2017–20	If Loving You Is Wrong	D.A. Linda Singer	Recurring cast: season 4 & 6, guest: season 5
2018	The Family Business	Det. Keisha Anderson	Episode: "We Are at War"
2021	Family Reunion	Carolyn	Episode: "Remember When Cocoa Found Her Calling?"
2022	Snowfall	Henrietta	Episode: "Comets"
