= Tom Proctor (actor) =

American actor

- Born: United States
- Education: Scottsdale Community College
- Occupation: Actor

Tom Proctor is an American actor.

Proctor is best known for such films and television series as Lawless, Justified, the role of Biddee in 12 Years a Slave, Django Unchained, Looper, Touched by an Angel and the role of Horuz in Guardians of the Galaxy. In June 2018, Tom Proctor released his debut country album entitled "Working Man" by his band Tom Proctor and the A-Listers.

== Selected filmography ==
- Windrunner (1994) as Convict No. 1
- Halloween: The Curse of Michael Myers (1995) as Motorist
- Breaking Free (1995) as First Rancher
- Unhook the Stars (1996) as Duncan
- Coyote Summer (1996) as Little Max
- They Know (2006) as The killer
- Skeletons in the Desert (2008) as Captain McNamara
- Pandemic (2009) as Clay
- Bounty (2009) as Carl 'Grunt' Henderson
- The Black Waters of Echo's Pond (2009) as Thomas
- The Road to Freedom (2010) as Francias
- Texas Killing Fields (2011) as Poacher 2
- Bending the Rules (2012) as Thug No. 4
- The Courier (2012) as Torture Man
- Lawless (2012) as Hophead No. 2
- The Baytown Outlaws (2012) as Downstairs Thug
- Heathens and Thieves (2012) as Sheriff Ashplant
- Django Unchained (2012) as Candyland Cowboy (uncredited)
- Knife to a Gunfight (2013) as Don
- 12 Years a Slave (2013) as Biddee
- Guardians of the Galaxy (2014) as Horuz, Ravager
- The Birth of a Nation (2016) as E.T. Brantley
- Blood Sombrero (2016) as Coffin
- Off Sides 2016 (2016) as Menace
- Wilson (2017) as Silverwolf
- Alicia's Dream (2017) as Gregory
- Heart, Baby (2017) as Lucky
- Finding Eden (2017) as Donner
- My BFF Satan (2018) as Satan
- Benji (2018) as Cajun Captain
- The Ballad of Buster Scruggs (2018) as Cantina Bad Man (segment "The Ballad of Buster Scruggs")
- Beneath the Leaves (2019) as Behemoth
- Nation's Fire (2019) as Owen
- The Legend of 5 Mile Cave (2019) as Virgil Earp
- 47 Hours (2019) as Hilbilly
- The Devil Below (2021) as Kip
- Blue Ridge (2024-present) as Jeremiah Wade

== Awards ==
- 2014 Northeast Film Festival
  - Best Actor in a Short Film – Sins (2013)
