= Night auditor =

Night shift hotel front desk employee

A night auditor is an employee who works at the reception of a hotel during the course of the night shift. Apart from performing the usual duties of a hotel receptionist, the night auditor's main task is to perform accounting checks. Depending on the hotel's size, a night auditor might be responsible for coordinating with other night shift employees or shift their focus on the property's security.

== Description ==
=== Front office operations ===
Hotels operate 24 hours a day, as such they typically continue to provide front-desk services around the clock. The night auditor carries out the duties of the front desk agent (such as check ins, check outs, room changes, dealing with emergency situations, reservation and customer complaint handling) as well as performing wake up calls and providing concierge services and other duties carried out by a hotel receptionist, albeit less frequently than during the day. They are also responsible for handing the room keys to guests who are returning late and surveiling the hotel's entrance. In smaller hotels the night auditor also assumes the responsibilities of the night shift security guard. In larger hotels many services continue to be offered throughout the night and thus the front office is staffed by multiple employees. Night auditors may work alongside and coordinate the actions of other nighttime employees such as hotel security guards, night porters and maintenance personnel. In large hotels all night shift employees are headed by a night duty manager who assumes all the responsibilities of a general manager during the course of the night.

=== Night audit ===
Apart from their duties as a front office agent the night auditor also performs a wide range of accounting checks. This includes the transactions of hotel guests and walk in clients (passants), room occupancy, income and expenses from the hotel's departments (e.g., food and beverage, rooms, gift shop). The night audit itself is an audit of the guest ledger (or front office ledger); that is, the collection of all accounts receivable for currently registered guests. It can also be defined as the collection of all guest folios, the billing receipts for currently registered guests. The purpose of the night auditor includes, but is not limited to, ensuring the accuracy of all financial information and gathering all needed paperwork to complete the audit. This will include pulling any or all checked-out guests' registration cards and making sure guests are checked out in the system. One task of the night auditor is posting the day's room rate and room tax to each guest folio at the close of business, which usually occurs between midnight and 2 o'clock in the morning. Second, the night auditor must ensure the accuracy of charges to the guest folios, verify that the sum of revenues due to accounts receivable from the various departments found on the department control sheets equals the sum of the charges made to the guest folios. The results of those checks are then forwarded to the hotel's accounting department for further analysis.

Prior to the computerization of the front desk procedures, night audit checks were performed by hand and later supplanted by mechanical tools. Manual checks often failed to detect data input errors and by the early 2000s were almost fully replaced by specialized computer software. This development greatly simplified the night audit process, freeing up time for the night auditor to perform other tasks. One task of the night auditor is posting the day's room rate and room tax to each guest folio at the close of business day before finalizing the end of day procedure in the reservation system. Before the end of day procedure takes place, the night auditor backs up the reservation system to prevent the loss of data. The night auditor also prepares and prints a number of reports which outline the hotel's financial performance, reports tailored for the hotel's various departments and the previous day's logbook of incidents. Another part of the night audit is the charging (if necessary) of non-show reservations and checking if the room status of each room is classified correctly within the reservation system.

== Sources ==
- Ntonti, Anna (2003). Λειτουργία Υποδοχής (Front Office) [Front Office Operations] (in Greek). Sygchroni Ekdotiki. ISBN 960-90712-0-1.
