= Richard Francis Burton =

British explorer, army officer, writer and scholar (1821–1890)

Sir Richard Burton KCMG FRGS FRAS
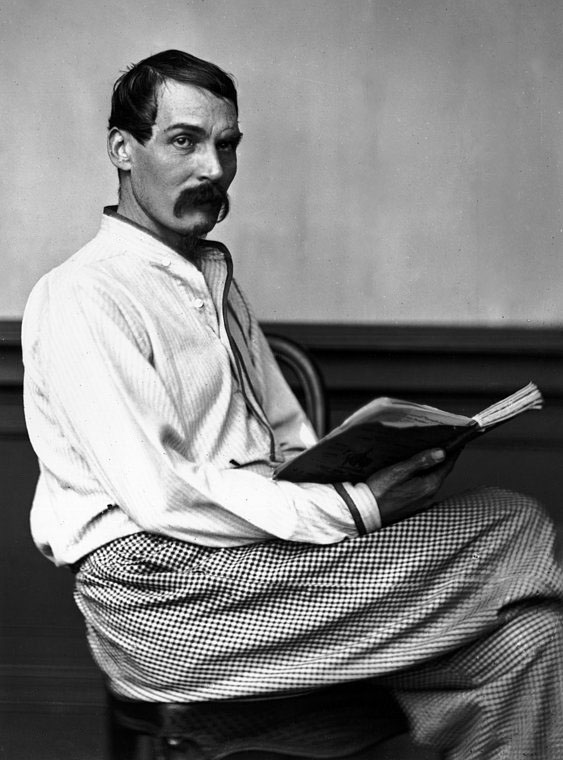
- Burton in 1864

British consul in Fernando Pó

British consul in Santos

British consul in Damascus

British consul in Trieste

Personal details
- Born: 19 March 1821 Torquay, Devon, England
- Died: 20 October 1890 (aged 69) Trieste, Austria-Hungary
- Spouse: Isabel Arundell (m. 1861)
- Education: Trinity College, Oxford
- Nickname: Ruffian Dick

Military service
- Allegiance: East India Company; British India
- Branch/service: Bombay Army
- Years of service: 1842–1861
- Rank: Captain
- Unit: 18th Regiment of Native Infantry
- Battles/wars: Crimean War
- Awards: Knight Commander of the Order of St Michael and St George and Crimea Medal
- Writing career
- Pen name: Mirza Abdullah the Bushri; Hâjî Abdû El-Yezdî; Frank Baker
- Notable works: Personal Narrative of a Pilgrimage to Al Madinah and Meccah; The Book of the Thousand Nights and a Night; The Kasidah

Sir Richard Francis Burton (19 March 1821 – 20 October 1890) was a British explorer, army officer, writer and scholar. He was famed for his travels and explorations in Asia, Africa and South America, as well as his extensive knowledge of languages and cultures, speaking up to 29 different languages.

Born in Torquay, Devon, Burton joined the Bombay Army as an officer in 1842, beginning an eighteen-year military career which included a brief stint in the Crimean War. He was subsequently engaged by the Royal Geographical Society (RGS) to explore the East African coast, where Burton along with John Hanning Speke led an expedition to discover the source of the Nile and became the first European known to have seen Lake Tanganyika. He later served as the British consul in Fernando Pó, Santos, Damascus and Trieste. Burton was also a Fellow of the RGS and was awarded a knighthood in 1886.

His best-known achievements include undertaking the Hajj to Mecca in disguise, translating One Thousand and One Nights and The Perfumed Garden, and publishing the Kama Sutra in English. Although he abandoned his university studies, Burton became a prolific and erudite author and wrote numerous books and academic articles on subjects such as human behaviour, travel, falconry, fencing, sexual practices and ethnography.

== Biography ==
=== Early life ===
Richard Burton was born in Torquay, Devon, on 19 March 1821; in his autobiography, he incorrectly claimed to have been born in the family home of Barham House in Elstree, Hertfordshire. Burton was baptised on 2 September 1821 at Elstree Church in Borehamwood, Hertfordshire. His father, Lieutenant-Colonel Joseph Netterville Burton, was an Anglo-Irish officer in the British Army's 36th (Herefordshire) Regiment of Foot. Joseph, through his mother's family, the Campbells of Tuam, was a first cousin of Henry Pearce Driscoll and Eliza Graves. Burton's mother, Martha Baker, was the daughter and co-heiress of Richard Baker, a wealthy Hertfordshire squire after whom Burton was named. He had two siblings, Maria Katherine Elizabeth Burton (who married Lieutenant-General Sir Henry William Stisted) and Edward Joseph Netterville Burton.

In his early life, Burton grew up between Elstree in England, the home of Richard's esteemed and wealthy namesake, Richard Baker, and, initially, Tours in France, the latter after their father sought a better climate for his asthma. The transition to Tours appears to have been before the death of Baker, on 16 September 1824. Burton was looked after while very young, in both England and France, by the family's "Hertfordshire nurse, Mrs. Ling, a good, but obstinately English soul"; his formal, early education began at a school in Tours, taught by "a lame Irishman named Clough", which was followed, when "for the children's sake" the family moved to a house in the Rue De L'Archeveche, "the best street" in Tours, after which "[t]he little Burtons... attended the academy of a Mr. John Gilchrist, who grounded them in Latin and Greek".

The Colonel, earlier preoccupied with (but also sustaining injury by) boar hunting, eventually began a pursuit of the study of chemistry, including experimental, that would persist for some time, while, during forays "into society", becoming known for his ability to "inexpressibly shoc[k]... sensitive company" in his directness of speech (e.g., publicly referring to "an adulteress" in that way), a characteristic that Thomas Wright, in his Life, suggests the son learnt from the father. The Burton family returned to England in 1829, and Richard and his brother Edward were sent to a preparatory school at Richmond Green run by a Reverend Charles Delafosse, a school that Wright describes in his Life as having "fees [that] were high", and the school as being "badly conducted" with the boys being "both ill-taught and ill-fed".

By the time measles broke out in the school, the Colonel had "tired of Richmond", and after arranging tutors for the children—a Rev. H. R. Du Pre for the boys, and a "peony-faced lady named Miss Ruxton" for Maria—the family moved to Blois, France (Du Pre continuing tenaciously, but Ruxton returning home, having "g[iven] up in despair"). The time in Blois would amount to a year, after which, via Marseille and "Leghorn" (Livorno, Italy), on the coast of Tuscany,), the family settled in Pisa, allowing the boys to become "proficient in Italian and drawing", and to begin the violin (against which Richard would rebel, and in which Edward would excel). By July 1832, they were in Siena and Perugia, then Florence, Rome and Naples, then Sorrento and Capri (with Rev. Du Pre yet in tow, and the Colonel still devoted to pursuits related to "[o]xygen, abandoning... mass" to become a gas). At this juncture, the boys are described as having become "generally ungovernable", with escapades that included "a visit to a house of poor reputation" and thwarted whipping by father and tutor.

Colonel Burton quit England again for France in 1836, for Pau in the south, and soon again after, for Italy, first Pisa, then Lucca, where the sons divided time "ruffl[ing] it with a number of dissolute medical students" learning "several quite original wickednesses", and time spent under the influence of their parents, in "more wholesome society", in the latter case with introductions to the painter Louis Desanges, to "Helen Croly, daughter of... [George Croly, author of] Salathiel", and to Virginia Gabriel, later a composer, and daughter of an English Major-general.

As well, during his youth, he allegedly had a sexual relationship with a Roma girl and learned the rudiments of the Romani language. The peregrinations of Burton's youth may have encouraged him to regard himself as an outsider for much of his life. In The Kasîdah of Hâjî Abdû El-Yezdî (1880) he wrote, "Do what thy manhood bids thee do, from none but self expect applause. He noblest lives and noblest dies who makes and keeps his self-made laws."

Throughout the foregoing period, Burton had ample opportunity to learn languages, modern and ancient, for which he had demonstrated aptitude; prior to departing for university, he had become acquainted with written ancient Greek and Latin, and had become fluent in French, Italian, and modern Greek, quickly learning these as well as Neapolitan and several dialects. According to biographer Ed Rice, during Burton's days at university, he would

sti[r] the bile of the dons by speaking real—that is, Roman—Latin instead of the artificial type peculiar to England, and [by speaking] Greek Romaically, with the accent of Athens, as he had learned it from a Greek merchant at Marseille, as well as [knowing] the classical forms. Such a linguistic feat was a tribute to Burton's remarkable ear and memory, for he was only a teenager when... in Italy and southern France."

In October 1840, he matriculated at Trinity College, Oxford. Before getting a room at the college, Burton was coached by William Alexander Greenhill and by a "Dr. Ogle"; he lived for a short time in the house of Greenhill, a doctor at the Radcliffe Infirmary. Wright, in his Life, notes that Burton "spent his first months, not in studying, but in rowing, [and] fencing"—in the latter case, in the "fencing saloons" of an Italian and a Scotsman, with mastery of foil and broad-sword—to which he added falconry. As well, he had engaged in "shooting the college rooks, and breaking the rules generally", and, despite his expressed respect, in pranks "at the expense of [a] Dr. Jenkins".

For all the experiences and education Burton brought with him to Oxford, he described his reception there as being unpleasant, and disparaged its educational offerings, stating that the "college teaching for which one was obliged to pay... was of the most worthless description", with "[t]wo hours a day... regularly wasted", noting that "those who read for honours... choose and pay a private coach". On a personal level, he describes having "grown a splendid moustache... the envy of all the boys abroad", that, despite his mentors Greenhill and Ogle advising removal, was only shaved after being given formal college orders; he describes having

already formed strong ideas upon the Shaven Age of England, when her history, with some brilliant exceptions, such as Marlborough, Wellington and Nelson, was at its meanest.

On being laughed at by a fellow undergraduate, he responded by challenging him to a duel. While there, he sat under the Christian teaching of John Henry Newman, "[t]he only preacher Burton would listen to"; Greenhill, Burton's mentor, was Newman's churchwarden.

Still, Burton "longed to excel as a linguist, and particularly in Oriental languages", and sought to learn Arabic, approaching the Regius Professor (Note: There is no Regius Professor of Arabic at Oxford. The Laudian Professor of Arabic until 1840 was Wyndham Knatchbull, succeeded by Stephen Reay.)—whose retort was that professors did not teach individuals—and then going it alone, with "a little assistance from the Spanish scholar Don Pascual de Gayangos". In April 1842, Burton attended a steeplechase event at the Oxford races, an act forbidden "at the last moment" by the college; the culprits being brought before the same on the morning following the event, "the dons having lectured Burton, he began lecturing them"—in particular, observing that "young men ought not to be treated like children". As such, while all other offenders were "rusticated" (temporarily expelled), Burton was instead permanently expelled from Oxford.

=== Bombay Army career ===
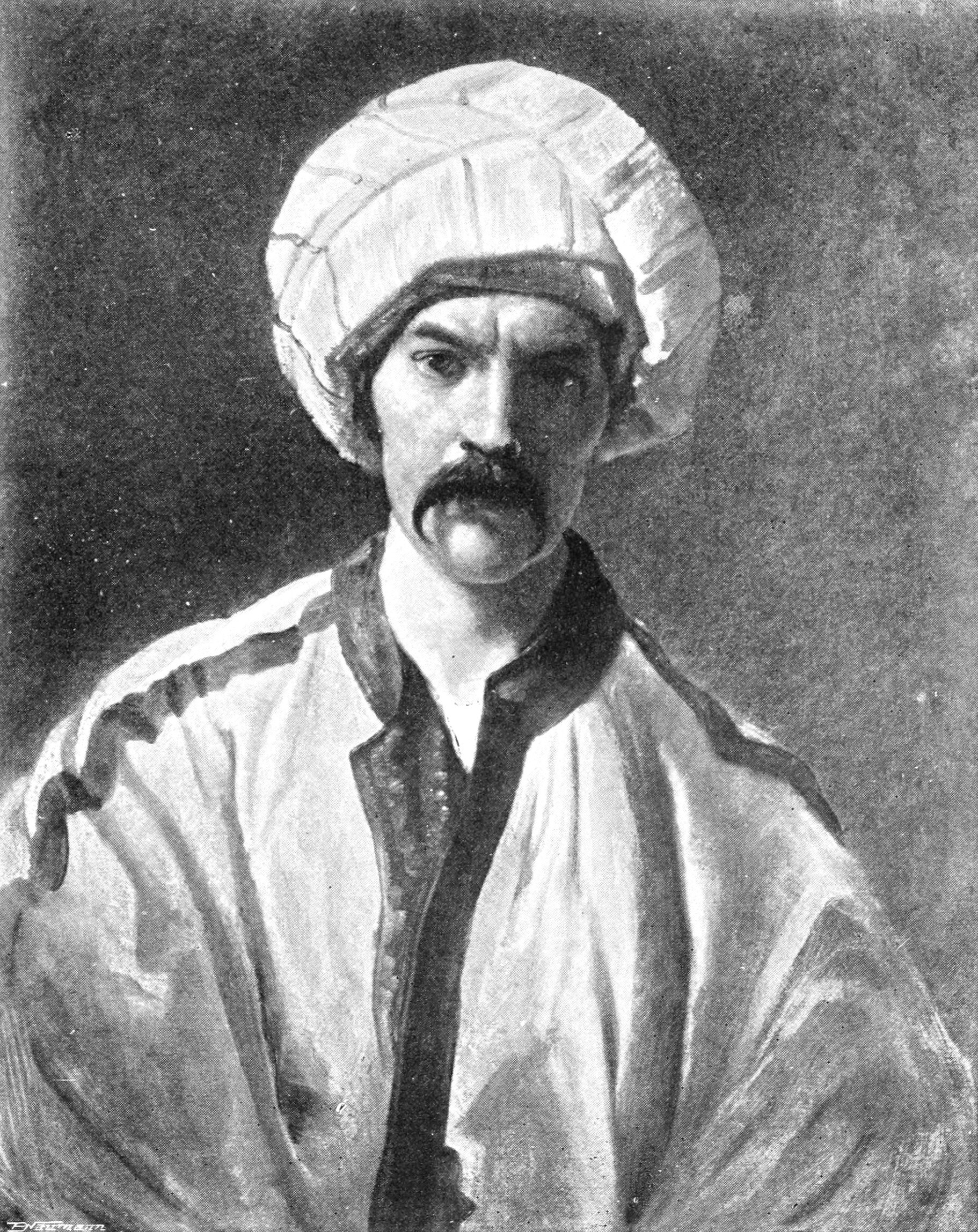
Burton in Persian disguise as "Mirza Abdullah the Bushri" (c. 1849)

In his own words, "fit for nothing but to be shot at for six pence a day", Burton was commissioned into the Bombay Army at the behest of his former classmates in college who were already serving as officers there. He had hoped to fight in the First Anglo-Afghan War, but the conflict was over by the time Burton arrived in India. He was posted to the 18th Regiment of Native Infantry, which was stationed in Gujarat and under the command of General Charles James Napier. He earned the nickname "Ruffian Dick", for his "demonic ferocity as a fighter and because he had fought in single combat more enemies than perhaps any other man of his time".

While in India, he became a proficient speaker of Persian and Arabic, as well as Hindustani, Gujarati, Punjabi, Sindhi, Saraiki, and Marathi, having passed six formal language examinations, and being in the process of studying for two more. (And while in the Bombay Army, he kept a large menagerie of tame monkeys in the hopes of learning their language, and has been quoted as stating he had accumulated sixty "words" of their speech.)

Burton also had a documented interest and actively participated in the cultures and religions of India. This was one of the many peculiar habits that set him apart from other British officers in India. According to a Burton autobiographical work, his studies of Hindu culture had progressed to such an extent that "my Hindu teacher officially allowed me to wear the janeo".

Burton's religious experiences were varied, including attending Catholic services, becoming a Naga Brahmin, converting to Sikhism and Islam, and undergoing the chilla retreat for Qadiriyya Sufism. Regarding Burton's Muslim beliefs, Rice stated that "he was circumcised, and made a Muslim, and lived like a Muslim and prayed and practiced like one." Furthermore, Burton, "was entitled to call himself a hāfiz, one who can recite the Qur'an from memory."

According to Rice, "Burton now regarded the seven years in India as time wasted." Yet he had passed six language examinations, was en route to two further, and so is described by Rice as "eminently qualified."

=== First explorations and journey to Mecca ===
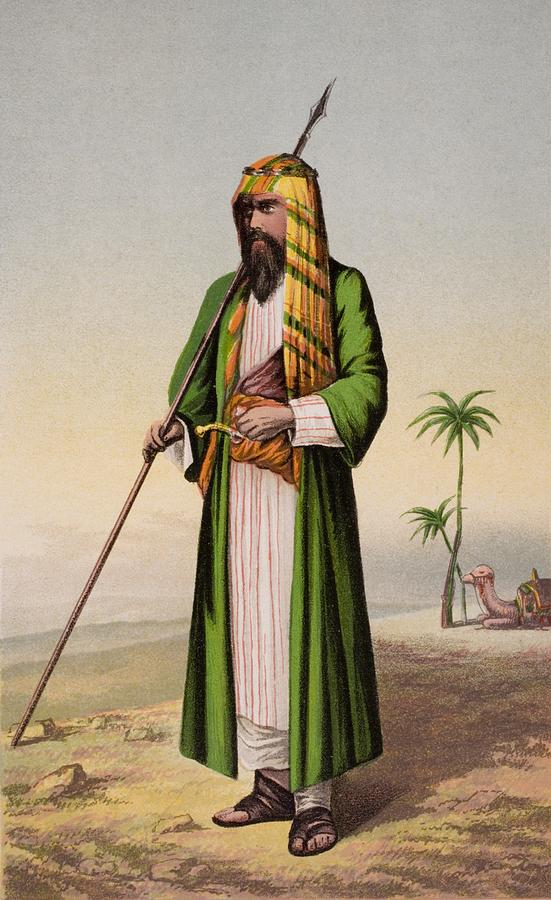
Burton disguised as "Haji Abdullah" in 1853 (illustration from Burton's Personal Narrative)

Motivated by his love for adventure, Burton gained the approval of the Royal Geographical Society (RGS) for an exploration of the Middle East, and, now at the rank of captain, received permission from the directors of the East India Company (EIC) to take leave from the Bombay Army. The seven years he spent in India gave Burton a familiarity with the customs and behaviour of Muslims and prepared him to attempt a Hajj to Mecca and Medina. He planned it whilst travelling disguised among Muslims in Sindh, and had laboriously prepared it by studying and practising Muslim culture, including undergoing circumcision to further lower the risk of being discovered.

Burton's undertaking of the Hajj in 1853 was his realisation of "the plans and hopes of many and many a year... to study thoroughly the inner life of the Moslem." He donned the guise of a Persian mirza, and then a Sunni sheikh, doctor, magician and dervish, accompanied by an enslaved Indian boy named Nūr. In April, he travelled through Alexandria before reaching Cairo by May, where Burton stayed during Ramadan in June. He further equipped himself with a case for carrying the Quran, but which instead had three compartments for his watch, compass, money, penknife, pencils and numbered pieces of paper for taking notes.

Burton travelled onwards with a group of nomads to Suez before sailing to Yambu and joining a caravan to Medina, where he arrived on 27 July. Departing Medina with a caravan on 31 August, Burton entered Mecca on 11 September, where he participated in the Tawaf. He travelled to Mount Arafat and participated in the stoning of the Devil, all the while taking notes on the Kaaba, its Black Stone and the Zamzam Well. Departing Mecca, he journeyed to Jeddah and then back to Cairo, returning to Army duty in Bombay. In India, Burton wrote his Personal Narrative of a Pilgrimage to Al-Medinah and Meccah, writing that "at Mecca there is nothing theatrical, nothing that suggests the opera, but all is simple and impressive... tending, I believe, after its fashion, to good."

Although Burton was not the first non-Muslim European to undertake the Hajj, with Ludovico di Varthema first to do so in 1503, and Johann Ludwig Burckhardt doing so in 1815, Burton's entry into Mecca is the most famous and the best documented of the period. He adopted various disguises, including that of a Pashtun, to account for any oddities in speech, but he still had to demonstrate an understanding of intricate Islamic traditions and a familiarity with the minutiae of Eastern manners and etiquette. Burton's trek to Mecca was dangerous, and his caravan was attacked by bandits (a common experience at the time). As he put it, although "... neither Koran or Sultan enjoin the death of Jew or Christian intruding within the columns that note the sanctuary limits, nothing could save a European detected by the populace, or one who after pilgrimage declared himself an unbeliever". The pilgrimage entitled him to the title of Hajji and to wear the green turban.

While back in India, Burton sat for the examination as an Arab linguist for the EIC. The examiner was Robert Lambert Playfair, who mistrusted Burton. As academic George Percy Badger knew Arabic well, Playfair asked Badger to oversee the exam. Having been told that Burton could be vindictive, and wishing to avoid any animosity should he fail, Badger declined. Eventually, Playfair conducted the tests; despite Burton's success in living like an Arab, Playfair recommended to the committee that Burton be failed. Badger later told Burton that "After looking [Burton's test] over, I sent them back to [Playfair] with a note eulogising your attainments and... remarking on the absurdity of the Bombay Committee being made to judge your proficiency inasmuch as I did not believe that any of them possessed a tithe of the knowledge of Arabic you did."

=== Early explorations ===
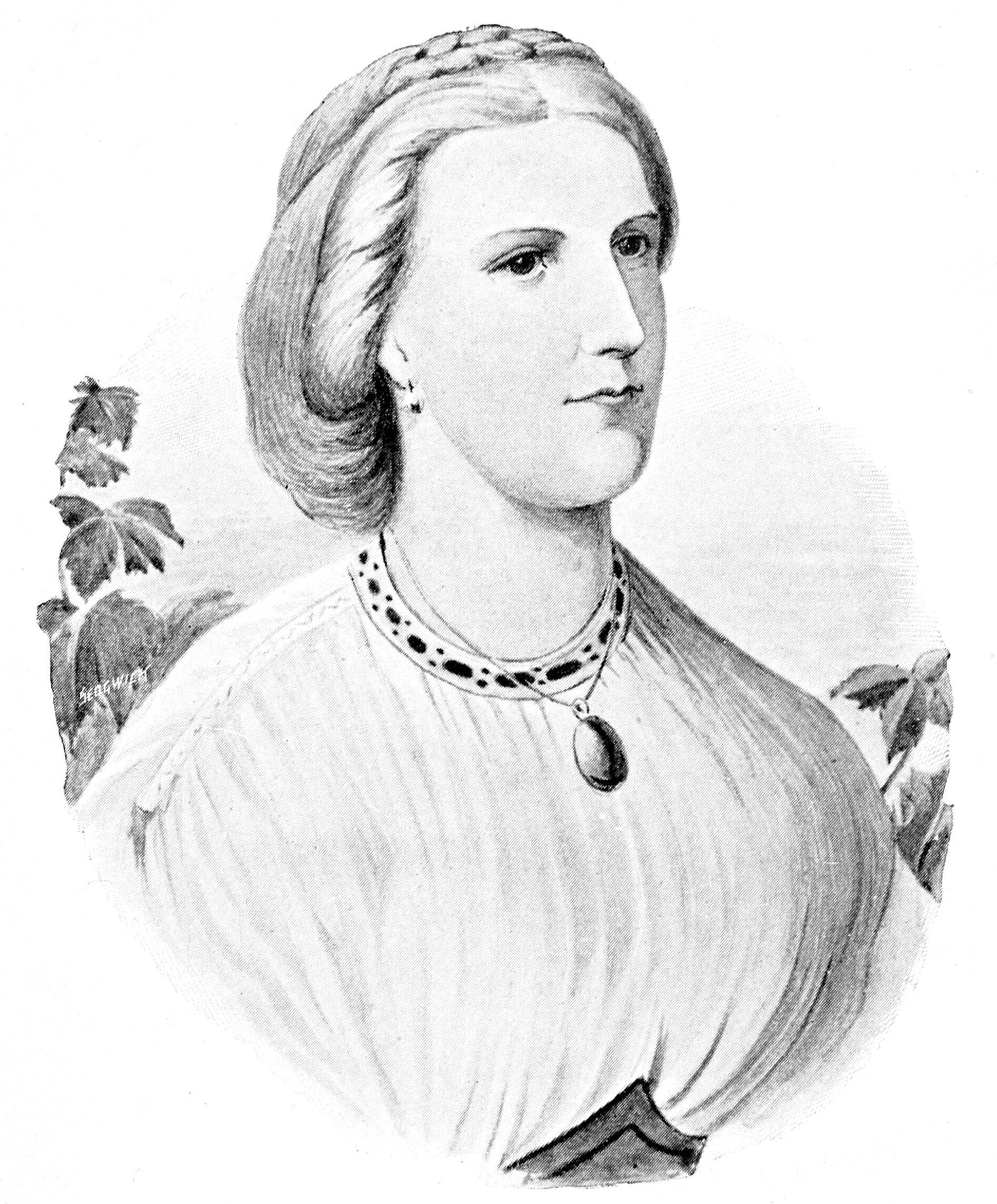
An illustration of Isabel Burton

In May 1854, Burton travelled to Aden in preparation for an RGS-backed expedition, which included John Hanning Speke, to Somaliland. The expedition lasted from 29 October 1854 to 9 February 1855, with much of its time spent in Zeila, where Burton was a guest of the town's governor Sharmarke Ali Saleh. Burton, assuming the disguise of an Arab merchant "Hajji Mirza Abdullah", awaited word that the road to Harar was safe. On 29 December, Burton met with Gerard Adan in the village of Sagharrah and openly proclaimed himself as a British officer with a letter for the Emir of Harar. On 3 January 1855, Burton made it to Harar and was graciously met by the Emir. He stayed in the city for ten days, officially a guest of the Emir but in reality his prisoner. Burton also investigated local landmarks in Harar; according to him, "A tradition exists that with the entrance of the first [white] Christian, Harar will fall." With Burton's entry, the tradition was broken. The journey back was plagued by lack of supplies, and Burton wrote that he would have died of thirst had he not seen desert birds and realised they would be near water. He made it back to Berbera on 31 January 1855.

Following this expedition, Burton prepared to set out in search of the source of the Nile, accompanied by Speke and a number of African porters and expedition guides. The Indian Navy schooner HCS Mahi transported them to Berbera on 7 April 1855. While the expedition was camped near Berbera, they were attacked by a group of Somali warriors from the Isaaq clan; the British estimated the number of attackers at 200. In the ensuing fight, Speke was wounded in eleven places before he managed to escape, while Burton was impaled with a javelin, the point entering one cheek and exiting the other, leaving a permanent scar. Burton was forced to escape with the weapon still transfixing his head. Burton subsequently wrote that the Somalis were a "fierce and turbulent race". However, the failure of this expedition (which also resulted in the second blockade of Berbera) was viewed harshly by the British authorities, and a two-year investigation was set up to determine to what extent Burton was culpable for this disaster. While he was largely cleared of any blame, his career prospects were damaged. He described the attack in First Footsteps in East Africa (1856).

After recovering from his wounds in London, Burton travelled to Constantinople during the Crimean War, seeking an officer's commission. He received one from Major-General William Ferguson Beatson as the chief of staff for Beatson's Horse, an irregular Ottoman cavalry unit stationed in Gallipoli. Burton returned to England after an incident which implicated him as the instigator of a mutiny among the unit, damaging his reputation and disgracing Beatson.

=== Exploring the African Great Lakes ===
In 1856, the Royal Geographical Society funded another expedition for Burton and Speke, "and exploration of the then utterly unknown Lake regions of Central Africa." They would travel from Zanzibar to Ujiji along a caravan route established in 1825 by an Arab ivory and slave merchant. The Great Journey commenced on 5 June 1857 with their departure from Zanzibar, where they had stayed at the residence of Atkins Hamerton, the British consul, their caravan consisting of Baluchi mercenaries led by Ramji, 36 porters, eventually a total of 132 persons, all led by the caravan leader Said bin Salim. From the beginning, Burton and Speke were hindered by disease, malaria, fevers and other maladies, at times both having to be carried in a hammock. Pack animals died, and natives deserted, taking supplies with them. Yet, on 7 November 1857, they made it to Kazeh, and departed for Ujiji on 14 December. Speke wanted to head north, sure they would find the source of the Nile at what he later named Victoria Nyanza, but Burton persisted in heading west.

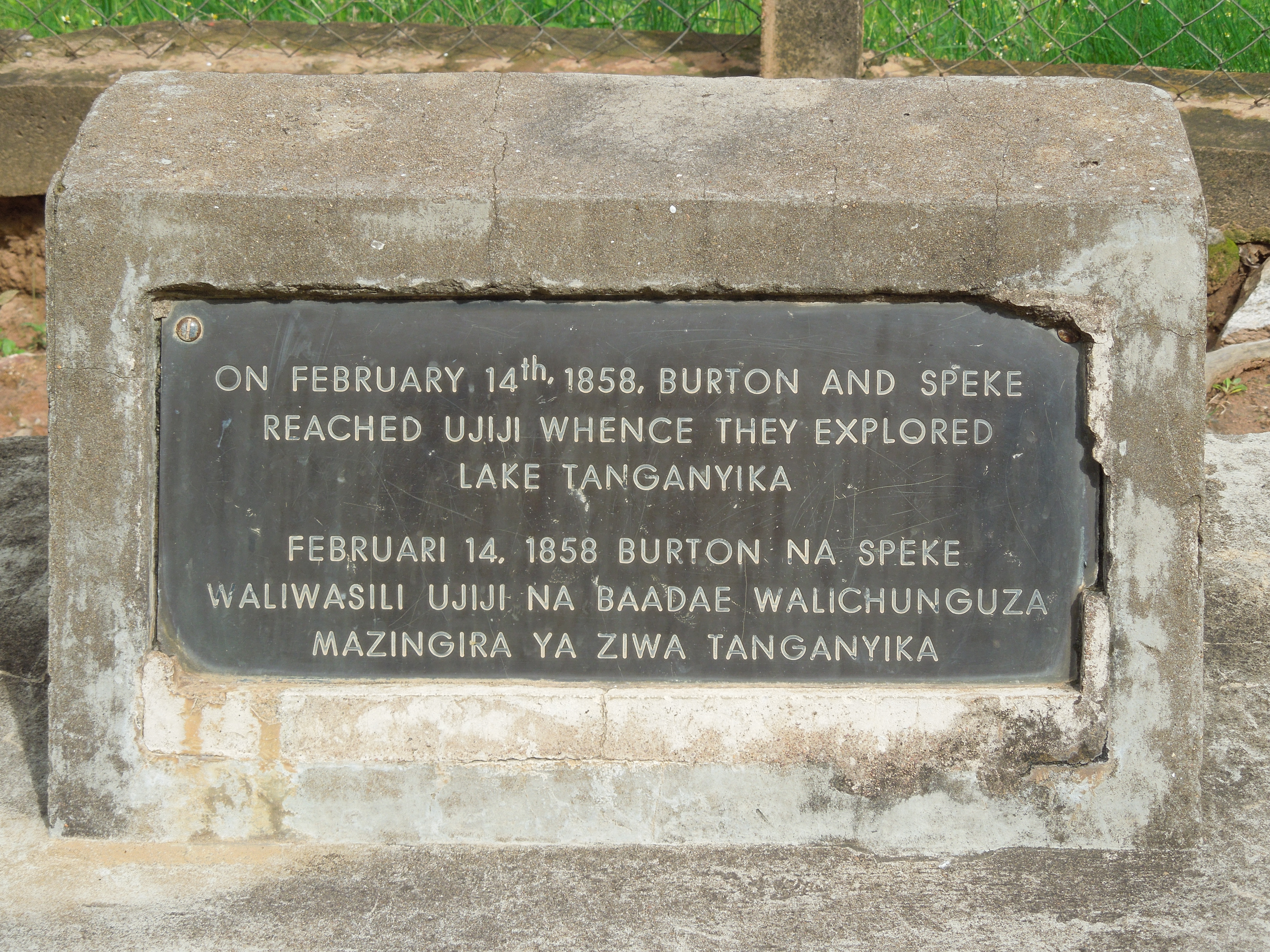
Monument commemorating Burton and Speke's arrival in Ujiji

The expedition arrived at Lake Tanganyika on 13 February 1858. Burton was awestruck by the sight of the magnificent lake, but Speke, who had been temporarily blinded, was unable to see the body of water. By this point much of their surveying equipment was lost, ruined or stolen, and they were unable to complete surveys of the area as well as they wished. Burton was again taken ill on the return journey; Speke continued exploring without him, making a journey to the north and eventually locating the great Lake Victoria, or Victoria Nyanza, on 3 August. Lacking supplies and proper instruments, Speke was unable to survey the area properly but was privately convinced that it was the long-sought source of the Nile. Burton's description of the journey is given in Lake Regions of Equatorial Africa (1860). Speke gave his own account in The Journal of the Discovery of the Source of the Nile (1863).

Burton and Speke made it back to Zanzibar on 4 March 1859, and left on 22 March for Aden. Speke immediately boarded HMS Furious for London, where he gave lectures, and was awarded a second expedition by the Society. Burton arrived in London on 21 May, discovering "My companion now stood forth in his new colours, an angry rival." Speke additionally published What Led to the Discovery of the Source of the Nile (1863), while Burton's Zanzibar; City, Island, and Coast was eventually published in 1872.

Burton then departed on a trip to the United States in April 1860, eventually making it to Salt Lake City on 25 August. There he studied Mormonism and met Brigham Young. Burton departed San Francisco on 15 November for the voyage back to England, where he published The City of the Saints and Across the Rocky Mountains to California.

==== Burton and Speke ====
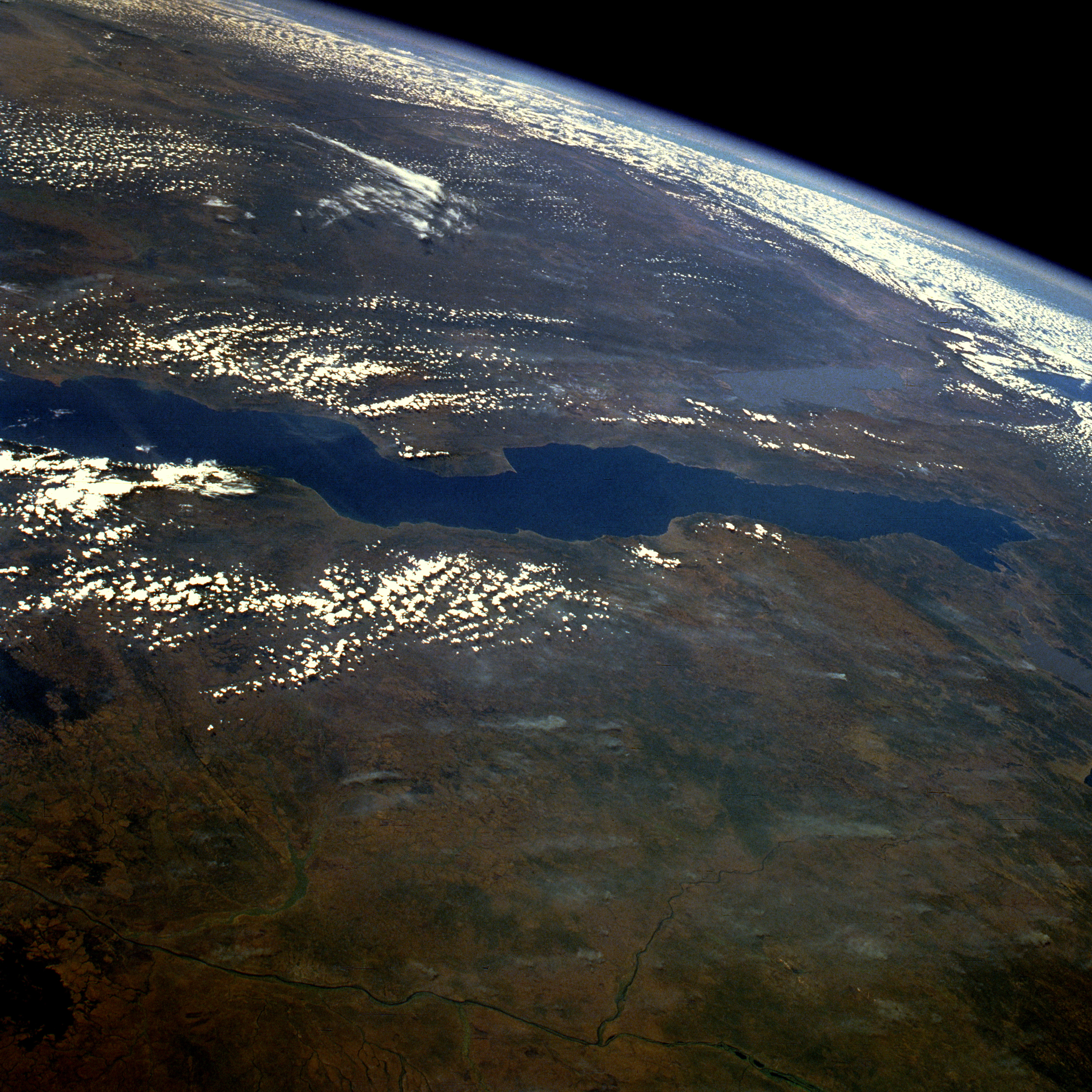
Burton was the first European to see Lake Tanganyika

A prolonged public quarrel followed, damaging the reputations of both Burton and Speke. Some biographers have suggested that friends of Speke (particularly Laurence Oliphant) had initially stirred up trouble between the two. Burton's sympathisers contend that Speke resented Burton's leadership role. Tim Jeal, who has accessed Speke's personal papers, suggests that it was more likely the other way around, Burton being jealous and resentful of Speke's determination and success. "As the years went by, [Burton] would neglect no opportunity to deride and undermine Speke's geographical theories and achievements".

Speke had earlier proven his mettle by trekking through the mountains of Tibet, but Burton regarded him as inferior as he did not speak any Arabic or African languages. Despite his fascination with non-European cultures, some have portrayed Burton as an unabashed imperialist convinced of the historical and intellectual superiority of the white race, citing his involvement in the Anthropological Society of London, an organisation which supported scientific racism. Speke appears to have been kinder and less intrusive to the Africans they encountered and reportedly fell in love with an African woman on a later expedition.

The two men travelled home separately. Speke returned to London first and presented a lecture at the Royal Geographical Society, claiming Lake Victoria as the source of the Nile. According to Burton, Speke broke an agreement they had made to give their first public speech together. Apart from Burton's word, there is no proof that such an agreement existed, and most modern researchers doubt that it did. Tim Jeal, evaluating the written evidence, says the odds are "heavily against Speke having made a pledge to his former leader". Speke undertook a second expedition, along with Captain James Grant and Sidi Mubarak Bombay, to prove that Lake Victoria was the true source of the Nile. Speke, in light of the issues he was having with Burton, had Grant sign a statement saying, among other things, "I renounce all my rights to publishing ... my own account [of the expedition] until approved of by Captain Speke or [the Royal Geographical Society]".

On 16 September 1864, Burton and Speke were scheduled to debate the source of the Nile at a meeting of the British Association for the Advancement of Science. On the day before the debate, Burton and Speke sat near each other in the lecture hall. According to Burton's wife, Speke stood up, said "I can't stand this any longer," and abruptly left the hall. That afternoon Speke went hunting on the nearby estate of a relative. He was discovered lying near a stone wall, felled by a fatal gunshot wound from his hunting shotgun. Burton learned of Speke's death the following day while waiting for their debate to begin. A jury ruled Speke's death an accident. An obituary surmised that Speke, while climbing over the wall, had carelessly pulled the gun after himself with the muzzle pointing at his chest and shot himself. Alexander Maitland, Speke's only biographer, concurs.

=== Diplomatic service and scholarship (1861–1890) ===
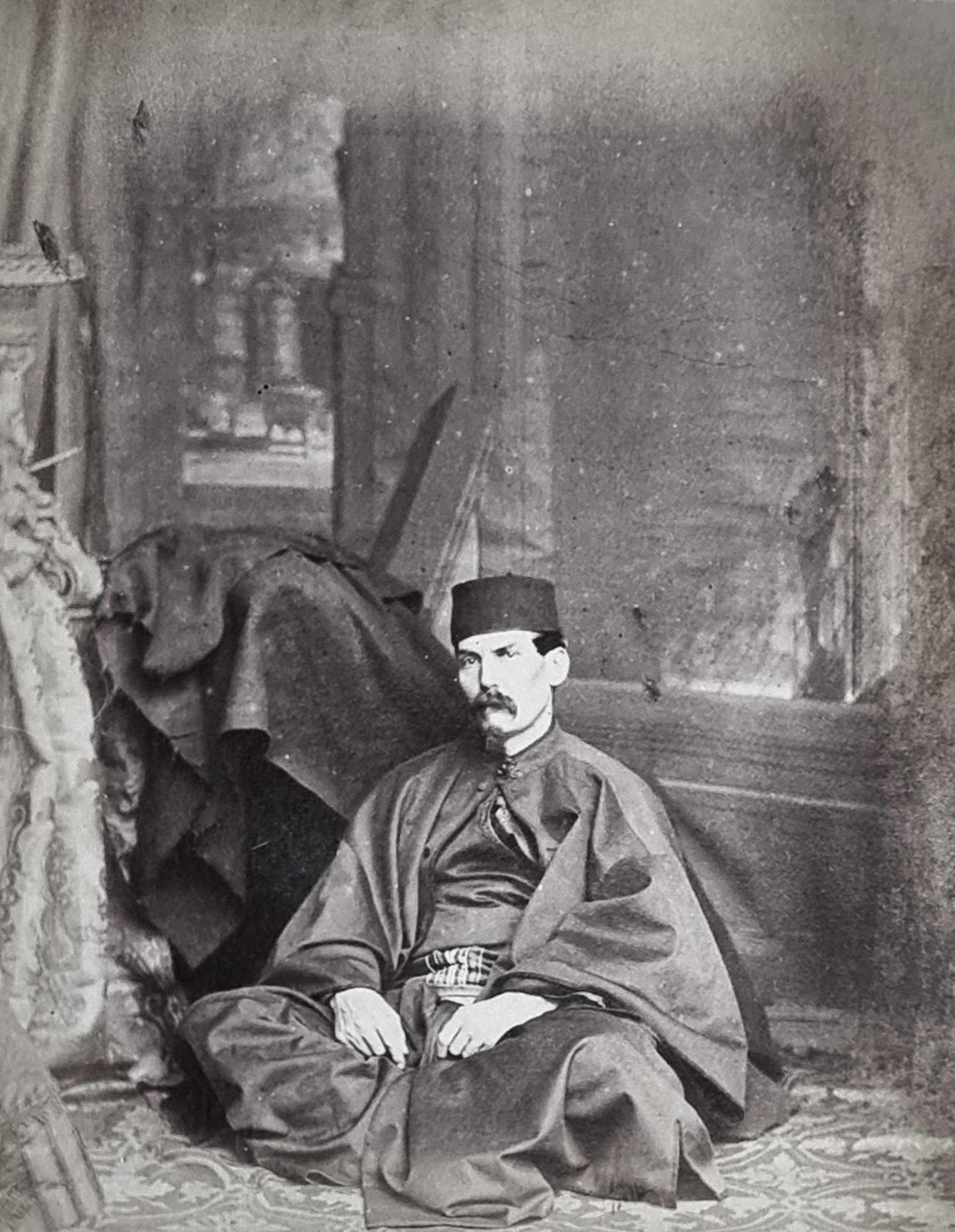
Portrait of Captain Richard Burton, 1864

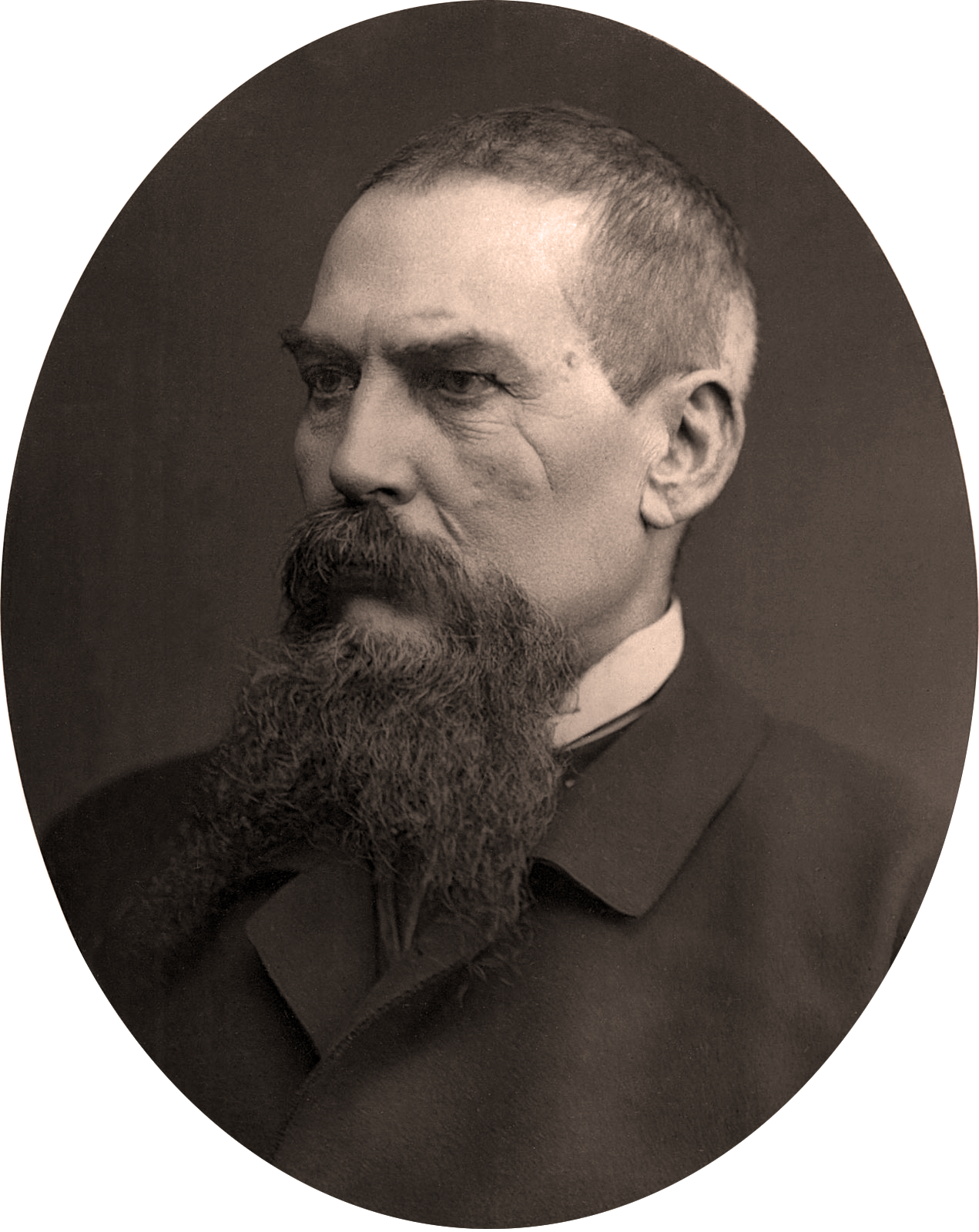
Burton in 1876

On 22 January 1861, Burton and Isabel Arundel married in a quiet Catholic ceremony, although he did not adopt the Catholic faith at this time. Shortly after this, the couple were forced to spend some time apart when he formally entered the Diplomatic Service as consul on the island of Fernando Po, now Bioko in Equatorial Guinea. This was not a prestigious appointment; because the climate was considered extremely unhealthy for Europeans, Isabel could not accompany him. Burton spent much of this time exploring the coast of West Africa, documenting his findings in Abeokuta and The Cameroons Mountains: An Exploration (1863), and A Mission to Gelele, King of Dahome (1864). He described some of his experiences, including a trip up the Congo River to the Yellala Falls and beyond, in his 1876 book Two trips to gorilla land and the cataracts of the Congo.

The couple were reunited in 1865 when Burton was transferred to Santos in Brazil. Once there, Burton travelled through Brazil's central highlands, canoeing down the São Francisco River from its source to the falls of Paulo Afonso. He documented his experiences in The Highlands of Brazil (1869). In 1868 and 1869, he made two visits to the war zone of the Paraguayan War, which he described in his Letters from the Battlefields of Paraguay (1870). In 1868, he was appointed as the British consul in Damascus, an ideal post for someone with Burton's knowledge of the region and customs. According to Ed Rice, "England wanted to know what was going on in the Levant," another chapter in The Great Game. Yet, the Turkish governor Mohammed Rashid 'Ali Pasha feared anti-Turkish activities, and was opposed to Burton's assignment.

In Damascus, Burton made friends with Abdelkader al-Jazairi, while Isabel befriended Jane Digby, calling her "my most intimate friend." Burton also met Charles F. Tyrwhitt-Drake and Edward Henry Palmer, collaborating with Drake in writing Unexplored Syria (1872). However, the area was in some turmoil at the time, with considerable tensions between the Christian, Jewish and Muslim populations. Burton did his best to keep the peace and resolve the situation, but this sometimes led him into trouble. On one occasion, he claims to have escaped an attack by hundreds of armed horsemen and camel riders sent by Mohammed Rashid Pasha, the Governor of Syria. He wrote, "I have never been so flattered in my life than to think it would take three hundred men to kill me." Burton eventually suffered the enmity of the Greek Christian and Jewish communities. Then, his involvement with the Sházlis, a Sufi Muslim order among whom was a group that Burton called "Secret Christians longing for baptism", which Isabel called "his ruin." He was recalled in August 1871, prompting him to send a telegram to Isabel: "I am recalled. Pay, pack, and follow at convenience."

Burton was reassigned in 1872 to the port city of Trieste in Austria-Hungary. A "broken man", Burton was never particularly content with this post, but it required little work, was far less dangerous than Damascus (as well as less exciting), and allowed him the freedom to write and travel. In 1863, Burton co-founded the Anthropological Society of London with Dr. James Hunt. In Burton's own words, the main aim of the society (through the publication of the periodical Anthropologia) was "to supply travellers with an organ that would rescue their observations from the outer darkness of manuscript and print their curious information on social and sexual matters". On 13 February 1886, Burton was appointed a Knight Commander of the Order of St Michael and St George (KCMG) by Queen Victoria.

He wrote a number of travel books in this period that were not particularly well received. His best-known contributions to literature were those considered risqué or even pornographic at the time, which were published under the auspices of the Kama Shastra society. These books include The Kama Sutra of Vatsyayana (1883) (popularly known as the Kama Sutra), The Book of the Thousand Nights and a Night (1885) (popularly known as The Arabian Nights), The Perfumed Garden of the Shaykh Nefzawi (1886) and The Supplemental Nights to the Thousand Nights and a Night (seventeen volumes 1886–98). Published in this period but composed on his return journey from Mecca, The Kasidah has been cited as evidence of Burton's status as a Bektashi Sufi. Deliberately presented by Burton as a translation, the poem and his notes and commentary on it contain layers of Sufic meaning that seem to have been designed to project Sufi teaching in the West. "Do what thy manhood bids thee do/ from none but self expect applause;/ He noblest lives and noblest dies/ who makes and keeps his self-made laws" is The Kasidah's most-quoted passage. As well as references to many themes from Classical Western myths, the poem contains many laments that are accented with fleeting imagery such as repeated comparisons to "the tinkling of the Camel bell" that becomes inaudible as the animal vanishes in the darkness of the desert.

Other works of note include a collection of Hindu tales, Vikram and the Vampire (1870); and his uncompleted history of swordsmanship, The Book of the Sword (1884). He also translated The Lusiads, the Portuguese national epic by Luís de Camões, in 1880 and, the next year, wrote a sympathetic biography of the poet and adventurer. The book The Jew, the Gipsy and el Islam was published posthumously in 1898 and was controversial for its criticism of Jews and for its assertion of the existence of Jewish human sacrifices. Burton's investigations into this had provoked hostility from the Jews of Damascus. The manuscript of the book included an appendix discussing the topic in more detail, but by the decision of his widow, it was not included in the book when published.

=== Death ===
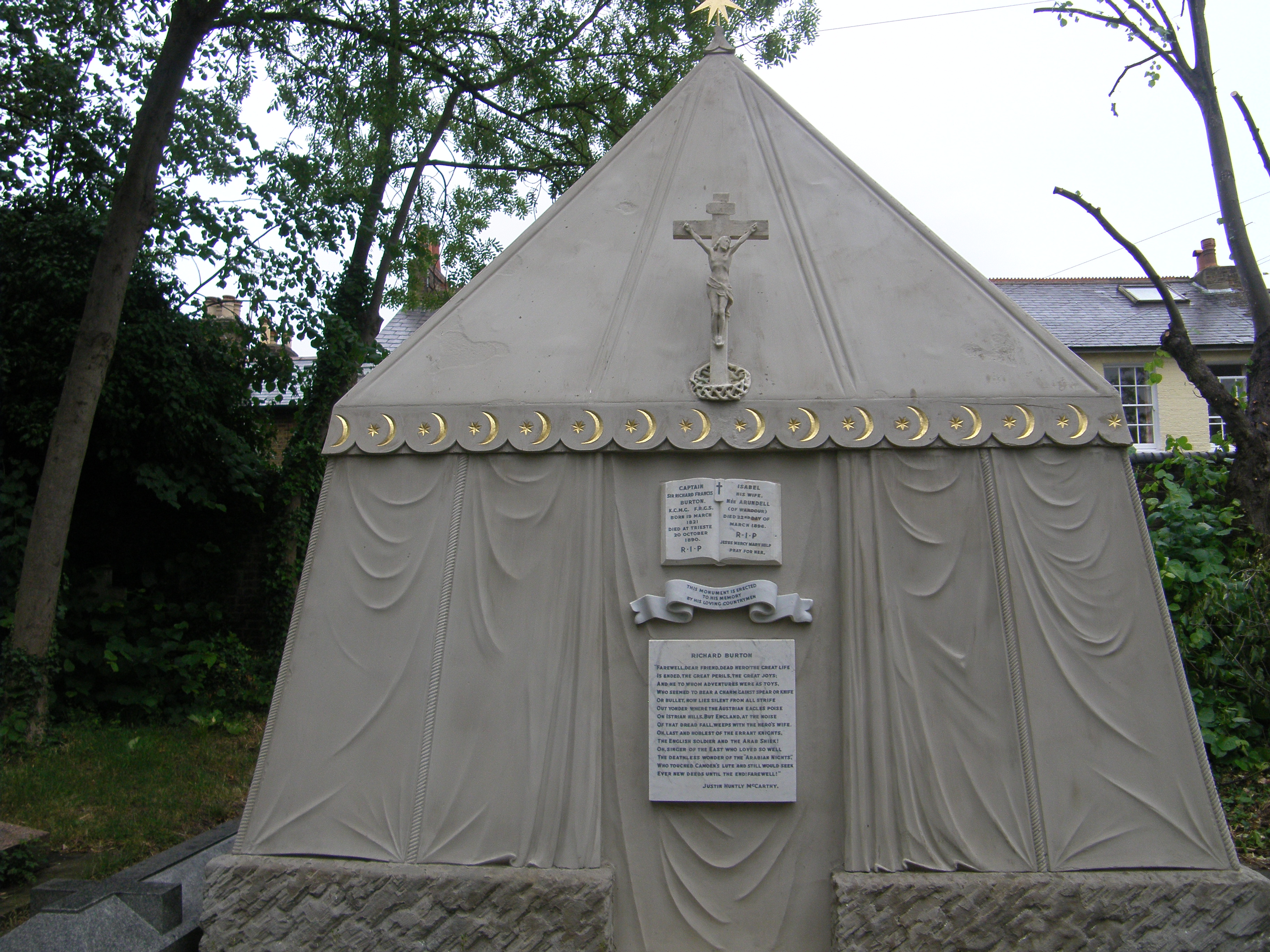
Richard Burton's tomb at Mortlake, south west London, June 2011

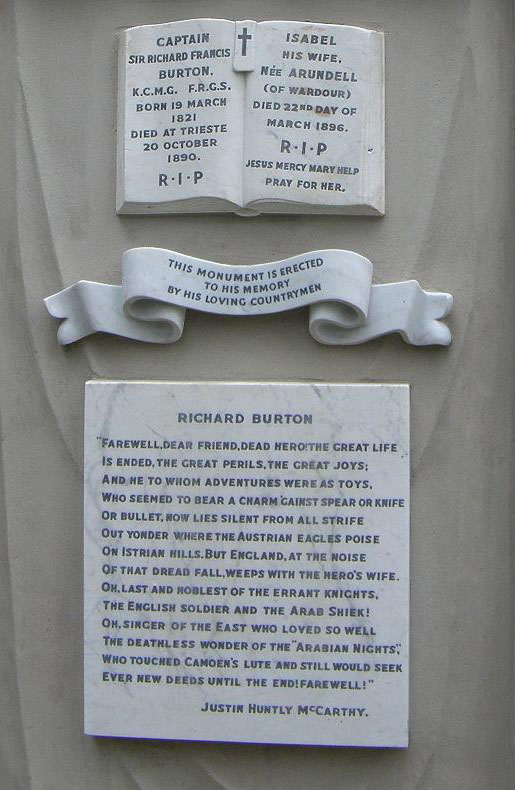
Close up of inscription on the tomb

Burton died in Trieste early on the morning of 20 October 1890 of a heart attack. His wife Isabel persuaded a priest to perform the last rites, although Burton was not a Catholic, and this action later caused a rift between Isabel and some of Burton's friends. It has been suggested that the death occurred very late on 19 October and that Burton was already dead by the time the last rites were administered. Regarding his religious views, Burton called himself an atheist, stating he was raised in the Church of England, which he said was "officially [his] church".

Isabel never recovered from the loss. After his death, she burned many of her husband's papers, including journals and a planned new translation of The Perfumed Garden to be called The Scented Garden, for which she had been offered six thousand guineas and which she regarded as his "magnum opus". She believed she was acting to protect her husband's reputation, and that she had been instructed to burn the manuscript of The Scented Garden by his spirit, but her actions were controversial. However, a substantial quantity of his written materials have survived, and are held by the Huntington Library in San Marino, California, including 21 boxes of his manuscripts, 24 boxes of correspondence, and other material.

Isabel wrote a biography in praise of her husband.

The couple are buried in a tomb in the shape of a Bedouin tent, designed by Isabel, in the cemetery of St Mary Magdalen Roman Catholic Church Mortlake in southwest London. The coffins of Sir Richard and Lady Burton can be seen through a window at the rear of the tent, which can be accessed via a short fixed ladder. Next to the lady chapel in the church, there is a memorial stained-glass window to Burton, also erected by Isabel; it depicts Burton as a medieval knight. Burton's personal effects and a collection of paintings, photographs and objects relating to him are in the Burton Collection at Orleans House Gallery, Twickenham. Among these is a small quartz stone from Mesopotamia, inscribed in supposed Kufic script, which has thus far resisted decipherment by experts.

== Kama Shastra Society ==
Burton had long had an interest in sexuality and some erotic literature. However, the Obscene Publications Act 1857 had resulted in many jail sentences for publishers, with prosecutions being brought by the Society for the Suppression of Vice. Burton referred to the society and those who shared its views as Mrs Grundy. A way around this was the private circulation of books among the members of a society. For this reason Burton, together with Forster Fitzgerald Arbuthnot, created the Kama Shastra Society to print and circulate privately books that would be illegal to publish.

One of the most celebrated of all his books is his translation of The Book of the Thousand Nights and a Night (commonly called The Arabian Nights in English after early translations of Antoine Galland's French version) in ten volumes (1885), with seven further volumes being added later. The volumes were printed by the Kama Shastra Society in a subscribers-only edition of one thousand with a guarantee that there would never be a larger printing of the books in this form. The stories collected were often sexual in content and were considered pornographic at the time of publication. In particular, the Terminal Essay in volume 10 of the Nights contained a 14,000-word essay entitled "Pederasty" (Volume 10, section IV, D), at the time a synonym for homosexuality (as it still is, in modern French). This was and remained for many years the longest and most explicit discussion of homosexuality in any language. Burton speculated that male homosexuality was prevalent in an area of the southern latitudes named by him the "Sotadic zone".

Perhaps Burton's best-known book is his translation of The Kama Sutra. It is untrue that he was the translator since the original manuscript was in ancient Sanskrit, which he could not read. However, he collaborated with Forster Fitzgerald Arbuthnot on the work and provided translations from other manuscripts of later translations. The Kama Shastra Society first printed the book in 1883 and numerous editions of the Burton translation are in print to this day.

His English translation from a French edition of the Arabic erotic guide The Perfumed Garden was printed as The Perfumed Garden of the Cheikh Nefzaoui: A Manual of Arabian Erotology (1886). After Burton's death, Isabel burnt many of his papers, including a manuscript of a subsequent translation, The Scented Garden, containing the final chapter of the work, on pederasty. Burton all along intended for this translation to be published after his death, to provide an income for his widow.

Burton's languages

By the end of his life, Burton had mastered at least 26 languages, or possibly up to 40 depending on how dialects are classified.

1. English
2. French
3. Occitan

a. Gascon/Béarnese dialect

4. Italian

a. Neapolitan Italian

5. Romani
6. Latin
7. Classical Greek
8. Saraiki
9. Hindustani

a. Urdu

10. Sindhi
11. Marathi
12. Arabic
13. Persian (Farsi)
14. Pushtu
15. Sanskrit
16. Portuguese
17. Spanish
18. German
19. Icelandic
20. Swahili
21. Amharic
22. Fan
23. Yoruba

a. Egba

24. Asante
25. Hebrew
26. Aramaic
27. Many other West African & Indian dialects

== Scandals ==
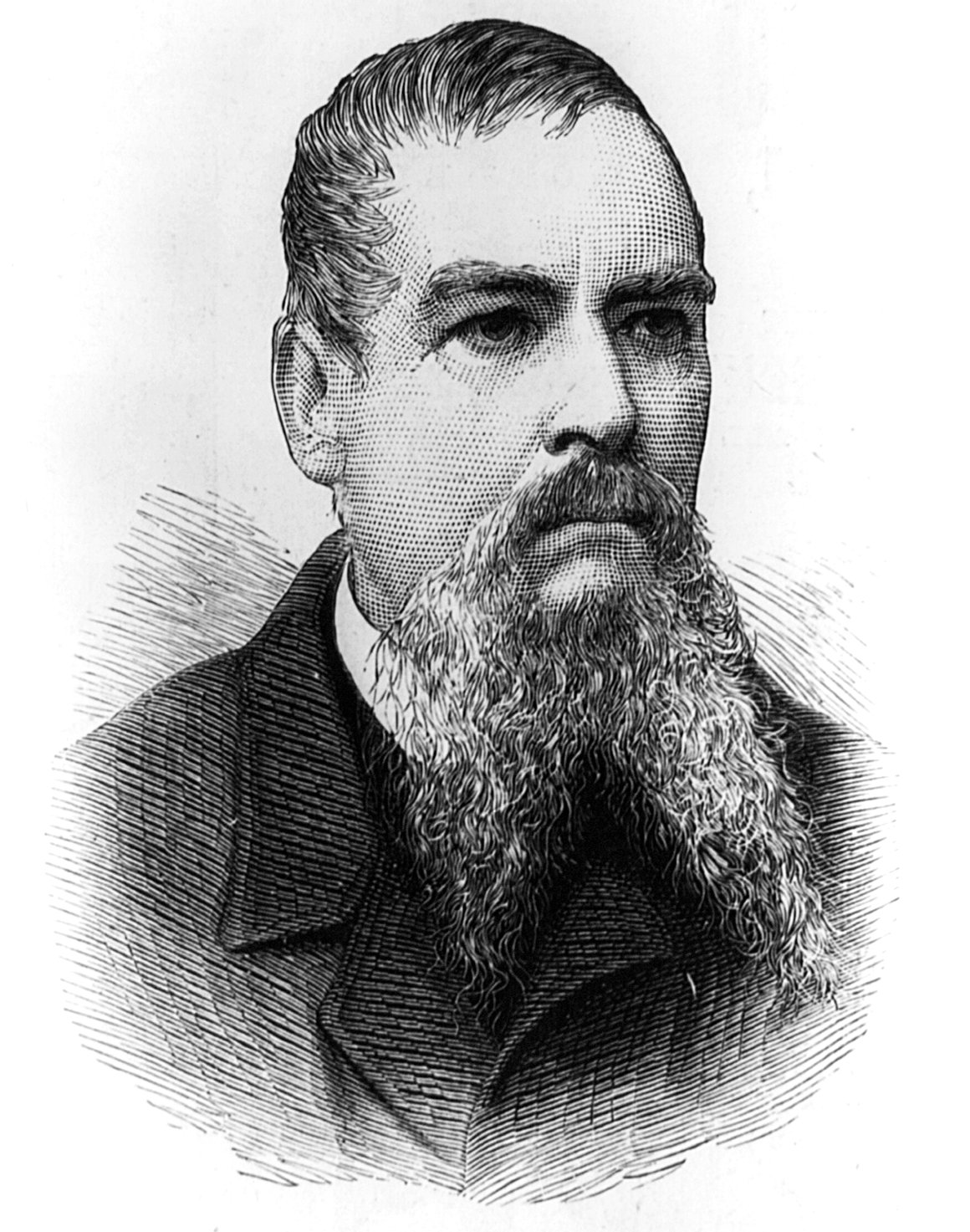
Burton in later life

Burton's writings are unusually open and frank about his interest in sex and sexuality. His travel writing is often full of details about the sexual lives of the inhabitants of areas he travelled through. Burton's interest in sexuality led him to make measurements of the lengths of the penises of male inhabitants of various regions, which he includes in his travel books. He also describes sexual techniques common in the regions he visited, often hinting that he had participated, hence breaking both sexual and racial taboos of his day. Many people at the time considered the Kama Shastra Society and the books it published scandalous.

Biographers disagree on whether or not Burton ever experienced homosexual sex (he never directly acknowledges it in his writing). Rumours began in his army days when Charles James Napier requested that Burton go undercover to investigate a male brothel reputed to be frequented by British soldiers. It has been suggested that Burton's detailed report on the workings of the brothel led some to believe he had been a customer. There is no documentary evidence that such a report was written or submitted, nor that Napier ordered such research by Burton, and it has been argued that this is one of Burton's embellishments.

A story that haunted Burton up to his death (recounted in some of his obituaries) was that, during his journey to Mecca disguised as a Muslim, he came close to being discovered one night when he lifted his robe to urinate rather than squatting as an Arab would. It was said that he was seen by an Arab and, to avoid exposure, killed him. Burton denied this, pointing out that killing the boy would almost certainly have led to his being discovered as an impostor. Burton became so tired of denying this accusation that he took to baiting his accusers, although he was said to enjoy the notoriety and even once laughingly claimed to have done it. A doctor once asked him: "How do you feel when you have killed a man?", Burton retorted: "Quite jolly. What about you?". When asked by a priest about the same incident Burton is said to have replied: "Sir, I'm proud to say I have committed every sin in the Decalogue." Stanley Lane-Poole, a Burton detractor, reported that Burton "confessed rather shamefacedly that he had never killed anybody at any time."

These allegations coupled with Burton's often irascible nature were said to have harmed his career and may explain why he was not promoted further, either in army life or in the diplomatic service. As an obituary described: "...he was ill fitted to run in official harness, and he had a Byronic love of shocking people, of telling tales against himself that had no foundation in fact." Ouida reported: "Men at the FO [Foreign Office] ... used to hint dark horrors about Burton, and certainly justly or unjustly he was disliked, feared and suspected ... not for what he had done, but for what he was believed capable of doing."

== Sotadic zone ==
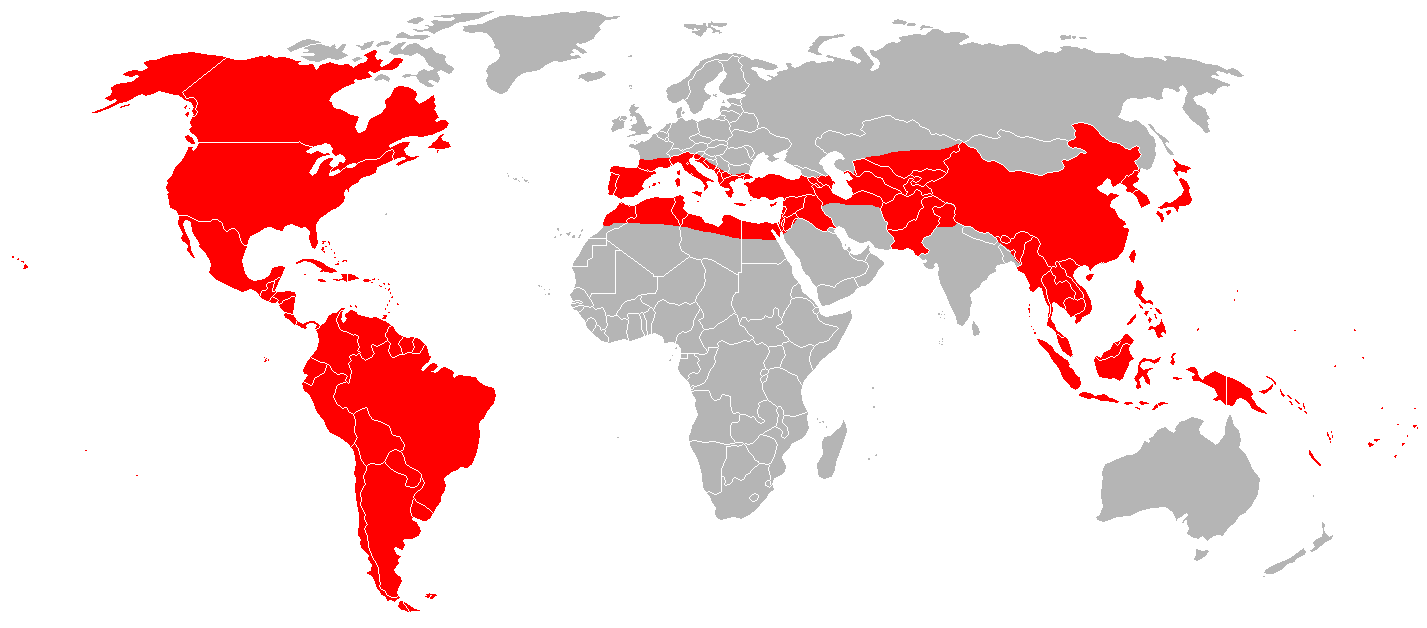
The "Sotadic Zone" of Burton encompassed the Mediterranean coastlines of Southern Europe and North Africa, the entire region of the Levant, larger areas of the Middle East and Asia, and all of the Americas.

Burton theorised about the existence of a "Sotadic zone" in the closing essay of his English translation of The Arabian Nights (1885–1886). He asserted that there exists a geographic-climatic zone in which sodomy and pederasty (sexual intimacy between older men and young pubescent/adolescent boys) are endemic, prevalent, and celebrated among the indigenous inhabitants and within their cultures. The name derives from Sotades, a 3rd-century BC Ancient Greek poet who was the chief representative of a group of Ancient Greek writers of obscene, and sometimes pederastic, satirical poetry; these homoerotic verses are preserved in the Greek Anthology, a collection of poems spanning the Classical and Byzantine periods of Greek literature.

Burton first advanced his Sotadic zone concept in the "Terminal Essay", contained in Volume 10 of his English translation of The Arabian Nights, which he called The Book of the Thousand Nights and a Night, published in England in 1886.

== In popular culture ==
=== Fiction ===
- In the short story "The Aleph" (1945) by Argentine writer Jorge Luis Borges, a manuscript by Burton is discovered in a library. The manuscript contains a description of a mirror in which the whole universe is reflected.
- The Riverworld series of science fiction novels (1971–83) by Philip José Farmer has a fictional and resurrected Burton as a primary character.
- William Harrison's Burton and Speke is a 1984 novel about the two friends/rivals.
- The World Is Made of Glass: A Novel by Morris West tells the story of Magda Liliane Kardoss von Gamsfeld in consultation with Carl Gustav Jung; Burton is mentioned on pp. 254–7 and again on p. 392.
- Der Weltensammler by the Bulgarian-German writer Iliya Troyanov is a fictional reconstruction of three periods of Burton's life, focusing on his time in India, his pilgrimage to Medina and Mecca, and his explorations with Speke.
- Burton is the main character in the "Burton and Swinburne" steampunk series by Mark Hodder (2010–2015): The Strange Affair of Spring-Heeled Jack; The Curious Case of the Clockwork Man; Expedition to the Mountains of the Moon; The Secret of Abdu El Yezdi; The Return of the Discontinued Man; and The Rise of the Automated Aristocrats. These novels depict an alternative world where Queen Victoria was killed early in her reign due to the inadvertent actions of a time-traveller acting as Spring-Heeled Jack, with a complex constitutional revision making Albert King in her place.
- Though not one of the primary characters in the series, Burton plays an important historical role in the Area 51 series of books by Bob Mayer (written under the pen name Robert Doherty).
- Burton and his partner Speke are recurrently mentioned in one of Jules Verne's Voyages Extraordinaires, the 1863 novel Five Weeks in a Balloon, as the voyages of Kennedy and Ferguson are attempting to link their expeditions with those of Heinrich Barth in west Africa.
- In the novel The Bookman's Promise (2004) by John Dunning, the protagonist buys a signed copy of a rare Burton book, and from there Burton and his work are major elements of the story. A section of the novel also fictionalises a portion of Burton's life in the form of recollections of one of the characters.
- Burton and Speke appear as characters in the historical novel The Romantic by William Boyd (2022).

=== Drama ===
- In the BBC mini-series The Search for the Nile (1971), Burton is portrayed by actor Kenneth Haigh.
- The film Mountains of the Moon (1990) (starring Patrick Bergin as Burton) relates the story of the Burton–Speke exploration and subsequent controversy over the source of the Nile. The script was based on Harrison's novel.
- In the Canadian film Zero Patience (1993), Burton is portrayed by John Robinson as having had "an unfortunate encounter" with the Fountain of Youth and living in present-day Toronto. Upon discovering the ghost of the famous Patient Zero, Burton attempts to exhibit the finding at his Hall of Contagion at the Museum of Natural History.
- In the American TV show The Sentinel, a monograph by Sir Richard Francis Burton is found by one of the main characters, Blair Sandburg, and is the origin of his concept of Sentinels and their roles in their respective tribes.

=== Film documentaries ===
- In The Victorian Sex Explorer, Rupert Everett documents Burton's travels. Part of the Channel Four (UK) 'Victorian Passions' season. First Broadcast on 9 June 2008.

== Chronology ==
Timeline of Richard Francis Burton's life (1821–1890)

== Works and correspondence ==
Burton published over 40 books and countless articles, monographs and letters. Many of his journal and magazine articles have not been catalogued. Over 200 of these have been collected in PDF facsimile format at burtoniana.org.

Brief selections from a variety of Burton's writings are available in Frank McLynn's Of No Country: An Anthology of Richard Burton (1990; New York: Charles Scribner's Sons).

== See also ==
- Selim Aga
- Mausoleum of Sir Richard and Lady Burton
- List of polyglots
