= Burton and Speke (novel) =

1982 historical novel by William Harrison

- First edition
- Author: William Harrison
- Language: English
- Publisher: Random House
- Publication date: 1982
- Publication place: United States
- Media type: Print
- Pages: 508
- ISBN: 0352315709
- Preceded by: Savannah Blue
- Followed by: Three Hunters

Burton and Speke is a 1982 historical novel by William Harrison recounting the 1857 expedition of the search for the source of the Nile by the famous Victorian explorer and linguist Sir Richard Burton and English amateur hunter John Hanning Speke. The book was adapted for film in 1990 by Harrison and director Bob Rafelson.

== Synopsis ==
Although both Burton and Speke were former military officers the expedition they agreed to undertake together was, according to the author, fated to be disastrous for them both, despite their ultimate success. They had no common bond, apart from their military service with the British Army and their typical British upper class Victorian upbringing, and were so dissimilar in character and moral beliefs as to be quite incomprehensible to each other.

Within a month of their departure from Mombasa on the East African coast into the unknown interior of Kenya the two men were barely speaking. The repressed and racially bigoted Speke felt that Burton was a lackadaisical wastrel, more interested in whoring and passing the time with natives and Arab traders than in the enterprise at hand and Burton believed the dyslexic Speke to be stupid and incompetent, unable even to learn how to use simple measuring devices, vital to serious exploration. Despite these obvious drawbacks however, it is Speke who eventually discovers Lake Victoria as the source of the Nile, due to Burton falling seriously ill with malaria and having to be left behind in an Arab trading camp.

Here their mutual antipathy turns to bitter enmity when Speke, breaking his word to Burton, claims sole credit for the discovery. Unfortunately for Speke his lack of accurate readings and sloppy map making skills lead the scientific world to doubt his word. Speke dies from a self-inflicted gunshot wound shortly before he and Burton were due to take part in a public debate regarding the controversy.

== Adaptation ==
Mountains of the Moon (1990) was directed by Bob Rafelson and starred Patrick Bergin and Iain Glen.
