= Mountains of the Moon (film) =

1990 film by Bob Rafelson

- Theatrical release poster
- Directed by: Bob Rafelson
- Screenplay by: William Harrison; Bob Rafelson
- Based on: Burton and Speke by William Harrison
- Produced by: Daniel Melnick; Mario Kassar
- Starring: Patrick Bergin; Iain Glen
- Cinematography: Roger Deakins
- Edited by: Thom Noble
- Music by: Michael Small
- Production company: Carolco Pictures
- Distributed by: Tri-Star Pictures
- Release date: February 23, 1990
- Running time: 136 minutes
- Country: United States
- Language: English
- Budget: $18 million
- Box office: $4 million

Mountains of the Moon is a 1990 American biographical film depicting the 1857–1858 journey of Richard Francis Burton and John Hanning Speke in their expedition to Central Africa, which culminated in Speke's discovery of the source of the Nile River and led to a bitter rivalry between the two men. The film stars Patrick Bergin as Burton and Iain Glen as Speke. Delroy Lindo appears as an African whom the explorers meet.

The film was directed by Bob Rafelson based on the 1982 novel Burton and Speke by William Harrison.

== Plot ==
In 1857, Richard Burton and John Speke decide to find the source of the Nile River. Richard Burton goes to a Royal Geographical Society meeting to declare that he is going to find the source of the Nile River. Burton goes to a wealthy gathering and meets Isabel and hopes to secure funds for the expedition. Speke joins Burton on his expedition. Burton claims that Lake Victoria is the source of the Nile River, Speke disagrees. Burton and Speke return to England, and then Speke claims to have discovered the source of the Nile River, which is a betrayal of their friendship. The two men go to the Royal Geographical Society to debate the source of the Nile River, and then Speke accidentally shoots himself dead.

== Cast ==
- Patrick Bergin as Richard Francis Burton
- Iain Glen as John Hanning Speke
- Richard E. Grant as Laurence Oliphant
- Fiona Shaw as Isabel Arundell
- John Savident as Lord Murchison
- James Villiers as Lord Oliphant
- Adrian Rawlins as Edward
- Peter Vaughan as Lord Houghton
- Delroy Lindo as Mabruki
- Paul Onsongo as Sidi Bombay
- Bheki Tonto Ngema as King Ngola
- Martin Okello as Veldu
- Bernard Hill as David Livingstone
- Matthew Marsh as William
- Richard Caldicot as Lord John Russell
- Christopher Fulford as Herne
- Garry Cooper as Stroyan
- Roshan Seth as Ben Amir
- Anna Massey as Mrs. Arundell
- Omar Sharif as Sultan (unbilled)
- Kenneth W Caravan as Speke Estate Farmhand (unbilled)

== Music ==
The original music was composed by Michael Small, who incorporated genuine traditional African music into a traditional orchestral palette. The soundtrack album was released on Polydor Records, but is long out of print. There are two major themes, one for Burton and the other for Africa. There is also a love theme for Burton's relationship to his wife Isabel Burton (portrayed in the movie by Fiona Shaw).

== Availability ==
The film was released in a pan and scan VHS edition from a widescreen laserdisc and is currently available as both a pan and scan and widescreen DVD.

Imprint Films released the film on Blu-ray in its original aspect ratio along with special features on February 28, 2024.

== Reception ==
Peter Travers described Mountains as "an epic of sweep and intimacy", and Siskel & Ebert gave it two thumbs up. Ebert wrote, "It's the kind of movie that sends you away from the screen filled with curiosity to know more about this man Burton." In Newsweek, critic Jack Kroll wrote, "The exploits of Sir Richard Francis Burton make Lawrence of Arabia look like a tourist." Mountains of the Moon holds a rating of 67% on Rotten Tomatoes based on 18 reviews.

== Bibliography ==
- Edward Rice, Captain Sir Richard Francis Burton: A Biography, Da Capo Press (June 5, 2001)
- Mary S. Lovell, A Rage to Live: A Biography of Richard and Isabel Burton, Norton & Company (1998)
