= The Kasidah =

Long English-language poem by Sir Richard Francis Burton

The Kasidah, book-binding by Sangorski & Sutcliffe

The Kasîdah of Hâjî Abdû El-Yezdî (1880) is a long English language poem written by "Hâjî Abdû El-Yezdî", a pseudonym of the true author, Sir Richard Francis Burton (1821–1890), a well-known British Arabist and explorer. In a note to the reader, Burton claims to be the translator of the poem, to which he gives the English title "Lay of the Higher Law." It is thus a pseudotranslation, pretending to have had an original Persian text, which never existed. The Kasidah is essentially a distillation of Sufi thought in the poetic idiom of that mystical tradition; Burton had hoped to bring Sufist ideas to the West.

== "The Translator" ==
As the Translator, Burton signs himself "F. B.," for Frank Baker, an English pen name from Francis (his middle name), and Baker (his mother's maiden name). In notes following the poem, Burton claims to have received the manuscript from his friend Haji Abdu, a native of Darabghird in the Yezd Province of Persia. Describing Haji Abdu, Burton writes that he spoke an array of languages and notes that "his memory was well-stored; and he had every talent save that of using his talents" — an apt description of the true author.

== Title and structure ==
A "Kasidah", or "Qasida", was originally a genre of Arabic poetry, generally satirical, elegiac, minatory, or laudatory. Typically, it was written in monorhyme throughout its length, which might be 50 to 100 lines, or more. The genre spread to Persia with Islam, where it became extremely popular and was much elaborated upon. In the Oxford English Dictionary entry on "kasidah", the form is defined as a classical Arabic or Persian panegyric in verse, which begins with a reference to encountering a deserted campground, followed by a lament, and a prayer to one's traveling companions to halt while the memory of the departed dwellers is invoked.

== Content ==
In adapting the style, techniques and ideas of the classical Sufi masters (Hafez, Omar Khayyam), Burton produced a sort of "spiritual autobiography" in The Kasidah. In exploring the limitations of Man's undeveloped reason, egoism and self-made religions, he sought a fulfillment of individual human destiny. Burton spread a wide net in his allusions and influences. One of his biographers claimed to find elements of Confucius, Longfellow, Plato, Aristotle, Pope, Das Kabir — as well as Edward FitzGerald's famous 1859 translation of The Rubaiyat of Omar Khayyam — in the work.

== Interpretation ==
The Sufi writer Idries Shah (1924–1996), in his 1964 book The Sufis, states that The Kasidah was a distillation of Sufi thought, and that "there seems little doubt that Burton was trying to project Sufi teaching in the West... In Sufism he finds a system of application to misguided faiths 'which will prove them all right, and all wrong; which will reconcile their differences; will unite past creeds; will account for the present and will anticipate the future with a continuous and uninterrupted development.'" (251-2) Shah devoted almost an entire chapter of the book to Burton's poem, calling it, "One of the most interesting productions of Western Sufic literature... Burton provided a bridge whereby the thinking Westerner could accept essential Sufi concepts."

== Quote ==
The best known couplets from The Kasidah are:

Do what thy manhood bids thee do, from none but self expect applause;
He noblest lives and noblest dies who makes and keeps his self-made laws.

All other Life is living Death, a world where none but Phantoms dwell,
A breath, a wind, a sound, a voice, a tinkling of the camel-bell.

— The Kasidah VIII, stanzas XXXVII and XXXVIII

Even Burton's hostile biographer Thomas Wright allowed that these four lines "can be pronounced imperishable".
