= Dowlish Wake =

Village and civil parish in Somerset, England

Coordinates: 50.9085°N 2.8903°W

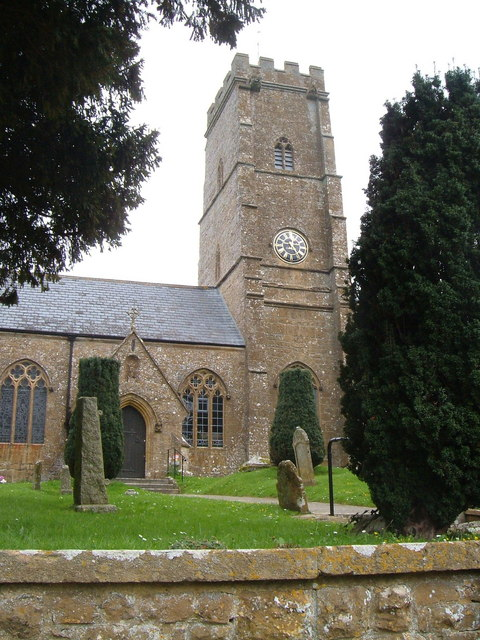
- St Andrews Church

- Location within Somerset
- Population: 277 (2011)
- OS grid reference: ST375125
- Unitary authority: Somerset Council
- Ceremonial county: Somerset
- Region: South West
- Country: England
- Sovereign state: United Kingdom
- Post town: Ilminster
- Postcode district: TA19
- Dialling code: 01460
- Police: Avon and Somerset
- Fire: Devon and Somerset
- Ambulance: South Western
- UK Parliament: Yeovil

Dowlish Wake is a small village and civil parish in Somerset, England, 2 miles (3 km) south of Ilminster and 5 miles (8 km) northeast of Chard. With a population of 277, it has several thatched houses and a pub, the New Inn. Its post office closed in 1991.

== History ==
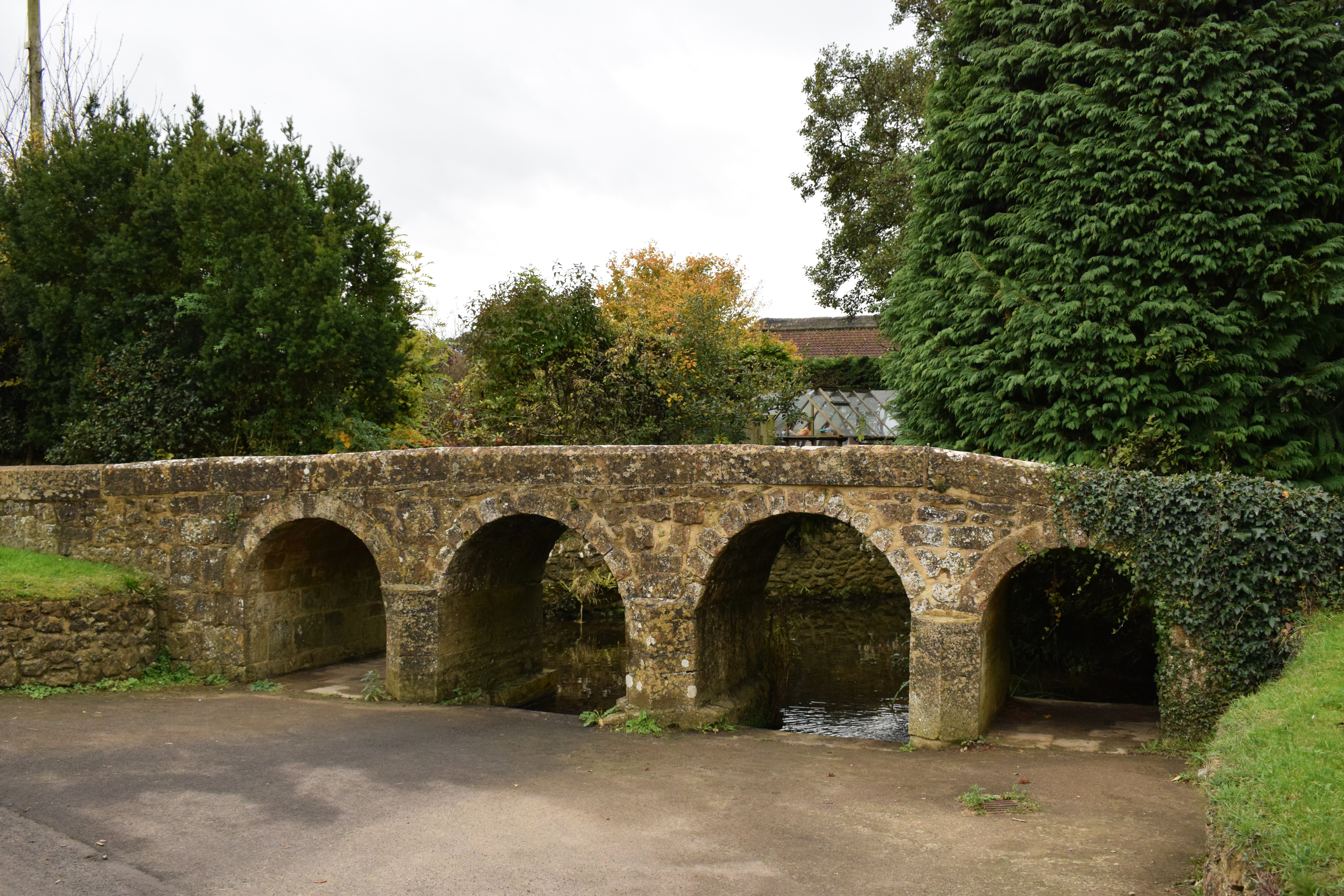
Packhorse bridge

The parish of Dowlish Wake was part of the South Petherton Hundred.

The village is situated on Dowlish Brook, which is crossed by a 17th-century packhorse bridge (widened in the 1990s) and a road bridge from the 18th century. There was a flour mill on the brook in the 17th century, but only the Mill House survives today. Until the early 1990s parts of the village were regularly cut off by floodwaters between two fords which cross the main road; however, this has largely been prevented by recent drainage improvements.

The village was a centre for the manufacture of silk and there are the remains of several limestone quarries. It was on the route of the Chard Canal, which was built around 1835–40 and intended as part of a ship canal between the Bristol Channel and the English Channel, but this was never built.

In 2004, a stone in a village garden, used by a widow to mark the grave of her pet cat, was identified by the village potter as a 9th-century Anglo-Saxon carving of St Peter.

The sports pavilion on the Lawrence Kellett Recreation Field was rebuilt in 2007, but then destroyed by arson in October 2016. A designated committee is working to raise funds to rebuild it again.

== Governance ==
As a civil parish, Dowlish Wake has its own parish council responsible for local issues, including setting an annual precept (local rate) to cover the council's operating costs and producing annual accounts for public scrutiny. The council:

- Evaluates local planning applications
- Works with the local police, district council officers and Neighbourhood Watch groups on matters of crime, security and traffic
- Manages the maintenance and repair of parish facilities
- Consults with the district council on the maintenance, repair and improvement of highways, drainage, footpaths, public transport and street cleaning
- Manages conservation work, including trees, listed buildings and environmental issues

For local government purposes, since 1 April 2023, the parish comes under the unitary authority of Somerset Council. Prior to this, it was part of the non-metropolitan district of South Somerset (established under the Local Government Act 1972). It was part of Chard Rural District before 1974.

Dowlish Wake is part of the county constituency of Yeovil, which covers the towns of Yeovil, Chard, Crewkerne and Ilminster in Somerset. It is represented in the House of Commons of the Parliament of the United Kingdom. The constituency elects one Member of Parliament (MP) by the first past the post system of election. Until 1983, Somerset was split into four constituencies, and Yeovil constituency also included the towns of Ilchester, Martock and Somerton, but they were moved into the newly created constituency of Somerton and Frome. As of the 2024 election, Ilchester was restored to the Yeovil constituency, to equalise the populations of the Somerset constituencies.

== Landmarks ==
=== Cider Mill ===
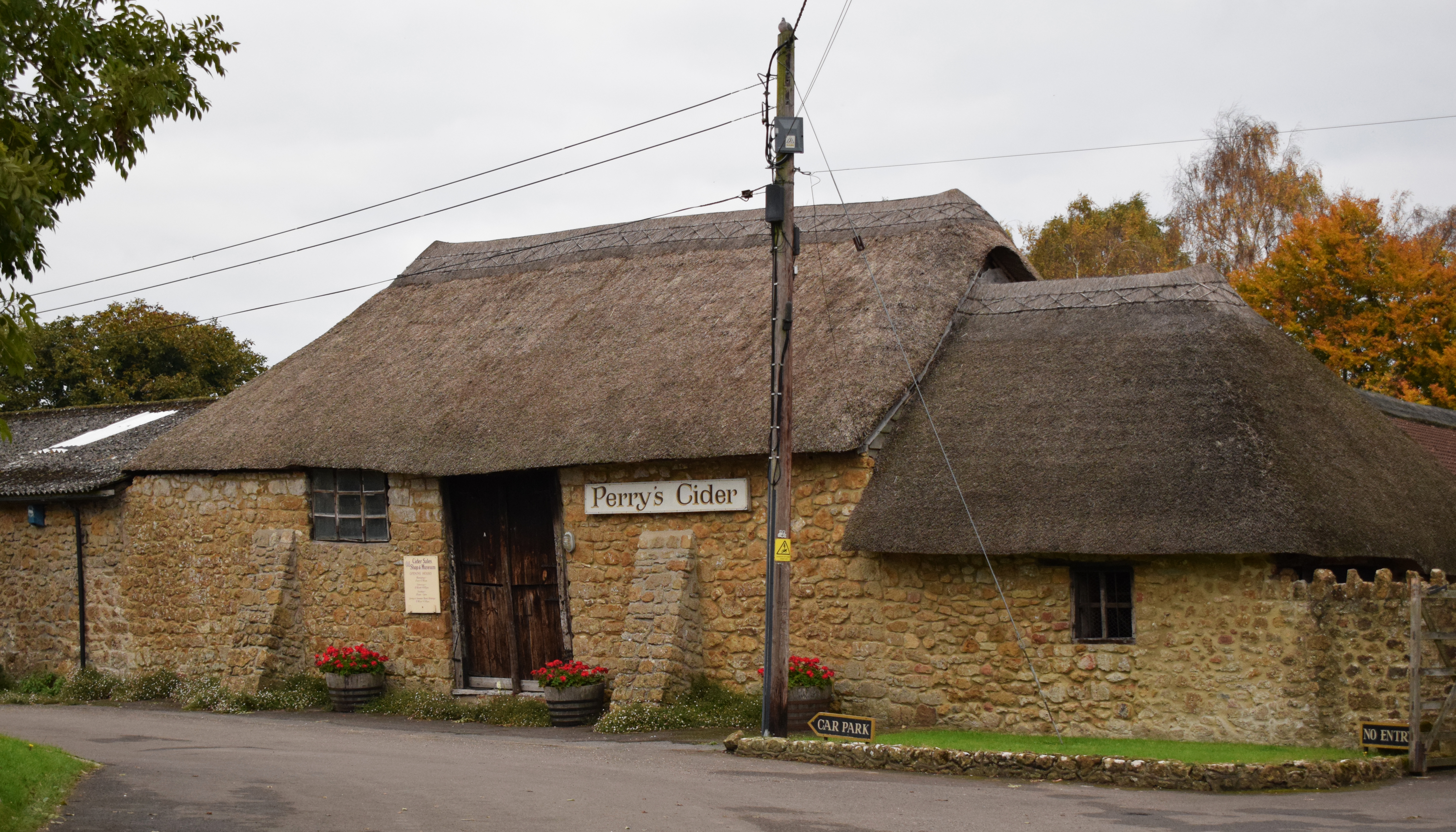
Perry's Cider Mill

The village is the home Perry's Cider Mill, manufacturers of several award-winning ciders. It occupies a 16th-century barn that may originally have been used as a smithy. It features a museum, and a cafe that opened in 2008.

=== Manor house ===
The hamstone Manor House has 11th-century origins, with the present building being from all periods from the 15th century. Known as Dowlish Farm by 1688, it was held by the Wake family from the 12th century. It passed through marriage to the Speke family at the end of the 15th century; they sold it in 1920.

=== Dower House ===
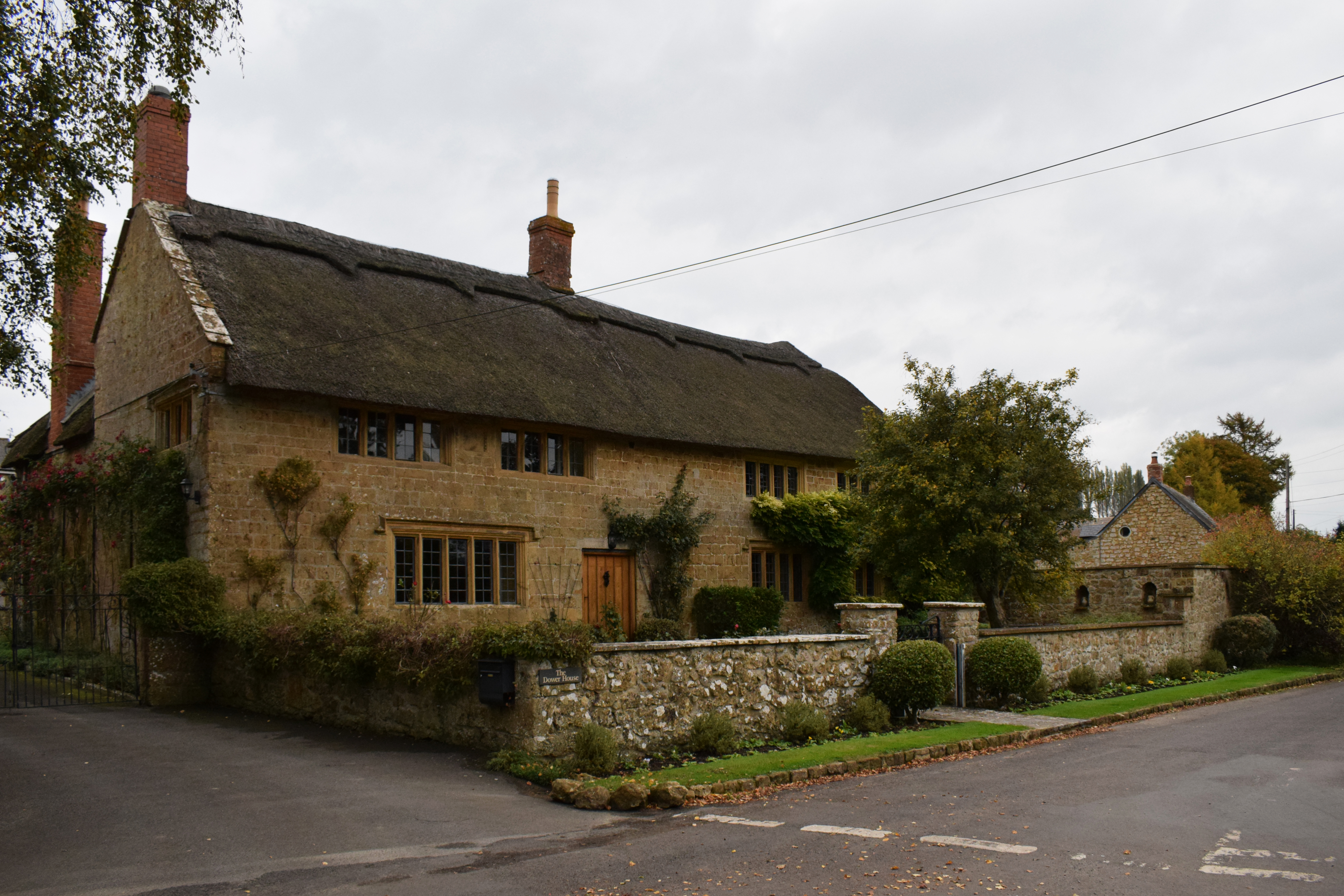
Dower House

The Dower House dates from 1664 and was leased to female members of the Speke family in the later 18th century, giving it its name.

=== Church and hall ===
The hamstone Norman Church of St Andrew includes fragments of the chancel dating from the 13th century, and has a tower and aisles added in 1528. Most of it was rebuilt in 1861–62. It has been designated by English Heritage as a Grade II* listed building.

Speke Hall, next to the church, was used, from its erection by William Speke, as the day and Sunday school from 1840 to 1949. It now serves as the village hall, hosting regular social functions.

== Notable residents ==
The Manor was the home of the family of John Hanning Speke who took part in three expeditions to Central Africa from 1854 to 1862, the last two in search of the source of the Nile. Speke discovered Lake Victoria and maintained that it was the source of the White Nile. On his third expedition, Speke identified Ripon Falls, the outlet of Lake Victoria, as the source of the Nile; this was confirmed by Henry Morton Stanley in a later expedition. Speke was killed in Neston Park in Wiltshire by his own gun while hunting with his cousin on 18 September 1864; Dr David Livingstone and Sir Roderick Murchison, President of the Royal Geographical Society, attended his funeral. A memorial to Speke, with a lifesize bust, is in the church where he is buried.

Dowlish Wake was the home of hot air balloonist Gary Mortimer and his family.
