= Paul Onsongo =

Kenyan actor

- Born: Paul Onsongo; July 21, 1948 (age 78); Mombasa, Kenya
- Occupation: Actor
- Years active: 1993–present
- Notable work: Mountains of the Moon
- Height: 1.63 m (5 ft 4 in)

Paul Onsongo (born 21 July 1948) is a Kenyan actor. He is most notable for the roles in the films Mountains of the Moon, Küken für Kairo and The Flame Trees of Thika.

== Personal life ==
He was born on 21 July 1948 in Mombasa, Kenya.

== Career ==
In 1974, he made his film debut with the movie Wilby Conspiracy. In 1981, he made his television debut with the mini series The Flame Trees of Thika. He played the supportive role of 'Juma' in the four episodes of the mini series. In the same year, he starred in the blockbuster biographical film Rise and Fall of Idi Amin where the film won five awards, including best actor, at the Las Vegas International Film Festival.

Then in 1985, he made appearance in the thriller film Küken für Kairo in which he played a minor role as 'Dealer'. In 1987, he made the lead role of Megitew in the television movie We Are the Children, where he became very popular. In 1989, he played the villain role of Abdullah in the film Cheetah. In 1990, he appeared in the biographical film Mountains of the Moon with the role 'Sidi Bombay'. His role became highly popular.

== Filmography ==
Year	Film	Role	Genre	Ref.
1974	Wilby Conspiracy		Film	
1981	The Flame Trees of Thika	Juma	TV mini-series	
1981	Rise and Fall of Idi Amin		Film	
1985	Küken für Kairo	Dealer	Film	
1987	We Are the Children	Megitew	TV movie	
1987	The Kitchen Toto	Thenge Oath giver	Film	
1989	Cheetah	Abdullah	Film	
1990	Mountains of the Moon	Sidi Bombay	Film	
1997	Baisikol		TV movie	
1999	Schwarzes Blut		TV movie	
