= Speke Monument =

Monument in Kensington Gardens, London

Coordinates: 51.5090°N 0.1791°W

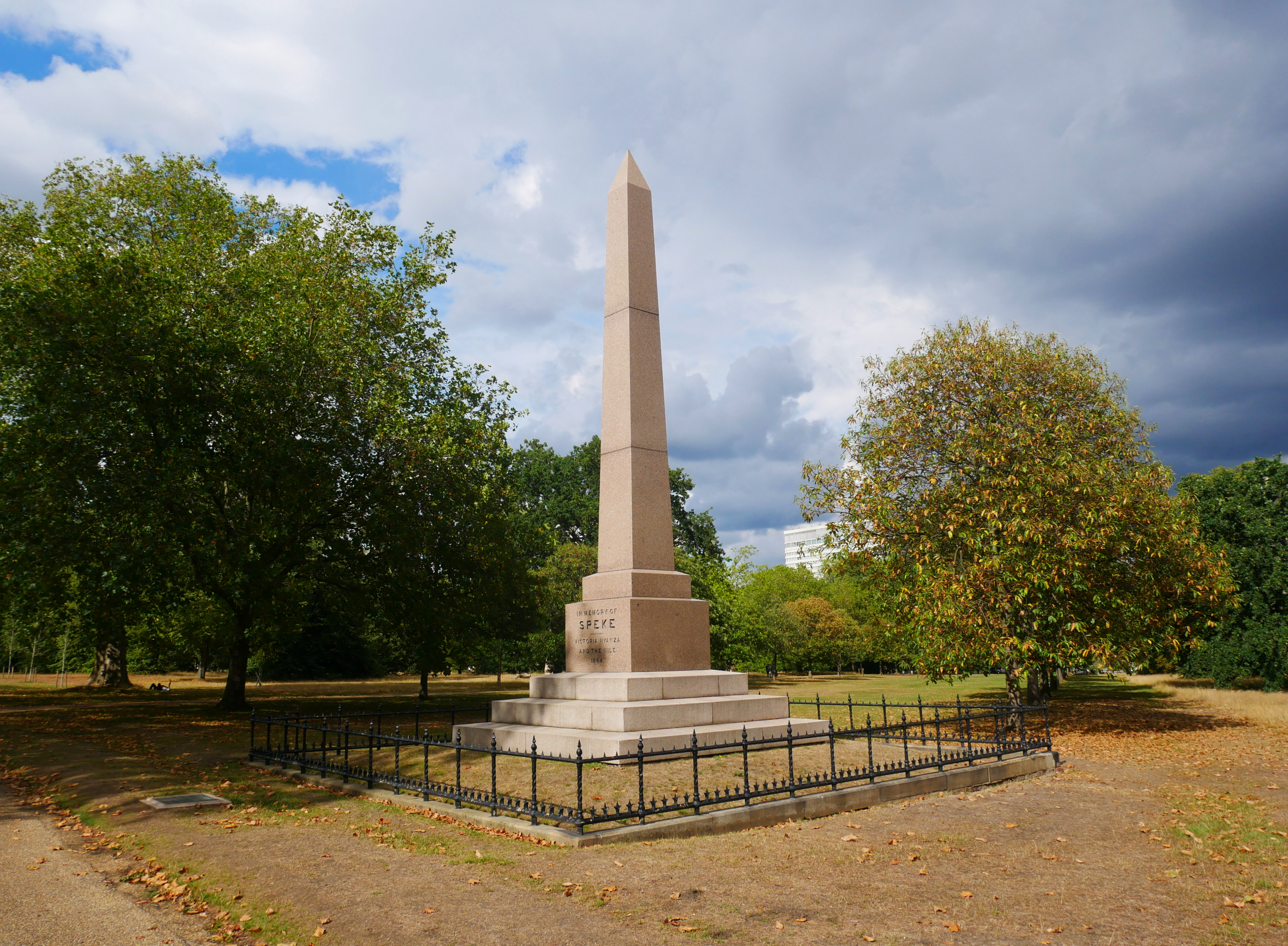
- Artist: Philip Hardwick
- Completion date: 1864
- Subject: John Hanning Speke
- Location: London

Listed Building – Grade II
- Official name: Speke's Monument
- Designated: 14 January 1970
- Reference no.: 1216828

The Speke Monument is a Grade II listed monument in the form of a granite obelisk in Kensington Gardens. It commemorates John Hanning Speke who is often credited with discovering Lake Victoria and the Source of the Nile.

Speke would make several expeditions into the African interior under the Royal Geographical Society, including those which would see him make his most famous discoveries. He would die in an accident while hunting.

The monument is a granite obelisk that stands next to the intersection of Budge's Walk and Lancaster Walk in Kensington Gardens. The monument was designed by Philip Hardwick with sponsorship from Roderick Murchison, then president of the Royal Geographical Society.
