= Church of St Andrew, Dowlish Wake =

Church in Somerset, England

Church of St Andrew
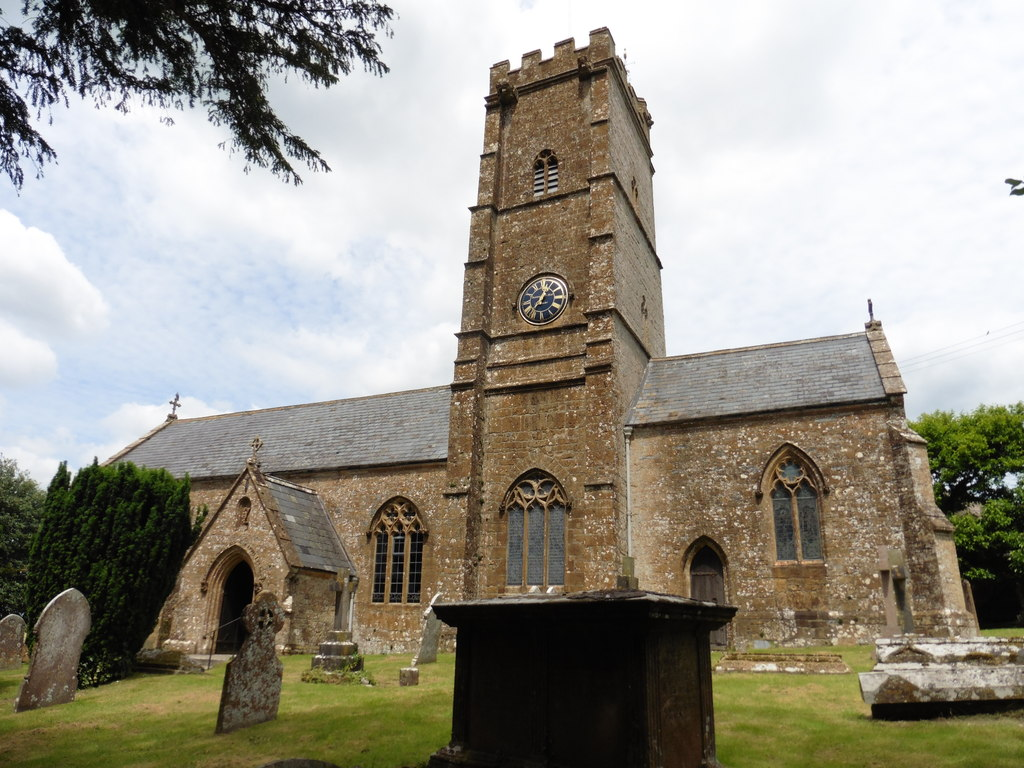

- Location within Somerset
- 50.9103°N 2.8886°W
- Location: Dowlish Wake, Somerset, England

History
- Built: 14th century

Listed Building – Grade II*
- Official name: Church of St Andrew
- Designated: 4 February 1958
- Reference no.: 1366405

The Anglican Church of St Andrew in Dowlish Wake, Somerset, England, was built in the 14th century. It is a Grade II* listed building.

== History ==
The church contains some of the fabric of a 13th-century church in the chancel however most of the building including the tower is from the 14th and was revised in the 15th. A Victorian restoration was carried out by Benjamin Ferrey in 1861 and 1862 when large parts of the church were rebuilt.

The parish is part of the Winsmoor benefice within the Diocese of Bath and Wells.

== Architecture ==
The stone building has hamstone dressings and a slate roof. It consists of three-bay nave, north aisle, single-bay chancel, and two-bay north-east chapel. The three-stage tower is supported by corner buttresses and has a stair turret behind a battlemented parapet. Within the tower is a peal of eight bells.

Inside the church most of the fittings are from the 19th century but it does have a font from the 11th or 12th century, which was brought to the church, from the one in West Dowlish, which was being demolished in 1575. There are several memorials including those to the Speke family including that to John Hanning Speke, who made three exploratory expeditions to Africa and is associated with the search for the source of the Nile. He was the first European to reach Lake Victoria.

In the churchyard is Speke Hall which was built in 1840 as a Sunday School and now serves as the village hall. Outside the church gate is a memorial stone.

== See also ==
- List of ecclesiastical parishes in the Diocese of Bath and Wells
