= Sidi Mubarak Bombay =

Tanzanian explorer

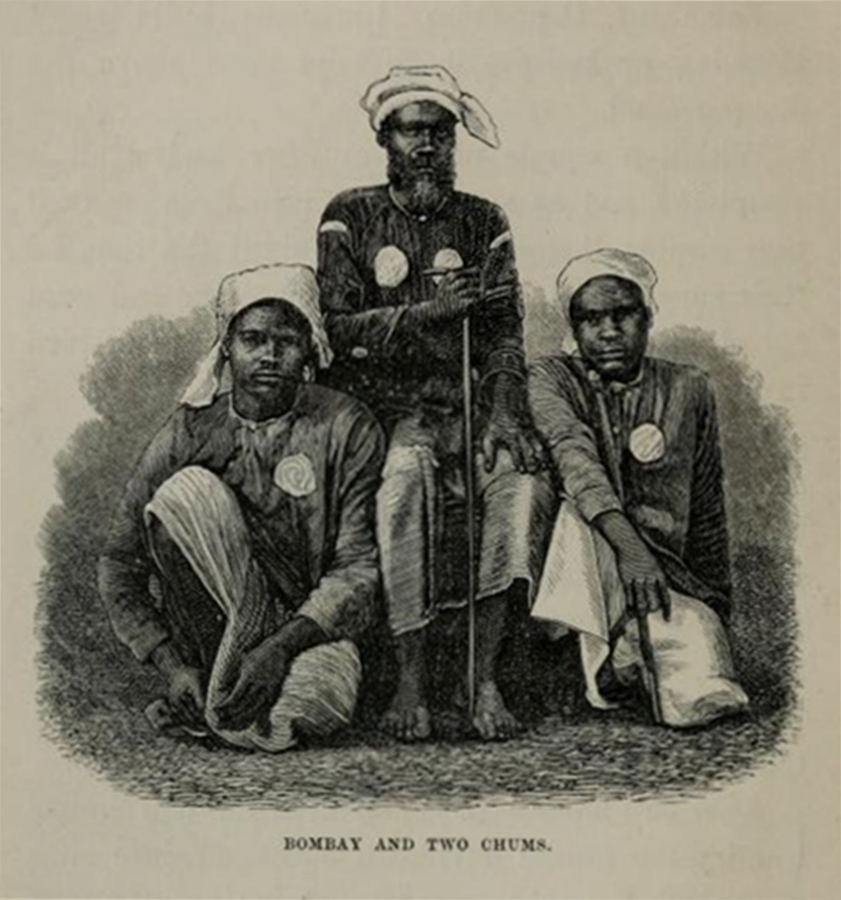
- Sidi Mubarak Bombay and companions (1877)
- Born: c. 1820; East Africa present day Ruvuma Region, Tanzania
- Died: 1885 (aged 64–65); Africa
- Occupations: Explorer, Guide
- Known for: Walking across the continent of Africa from the East coast to the West Coast. Involved in the 19th century expeditions of Europeans to locate the source of the River Nile

Sidi Mubarak Bombay (c. 1820–1885), Mbarak Mombée, was a waYao explorer and guide, who participated in numerous expeditions by 19th century British explorers to East Africa.

A waYao (subgroup of the Bantu peoples), he was born in 1820 on the border of Tanzania and Mozambique. As a young boy he was captured by Swahili slavers. His captors made him march to the slave market in Kilwa, where he was sold in exchange for some cloth, never again to see his family. Next he was sailed on a dhow to the Gujarat area of India. His owner gave him the slave name of ‘Mubarak’. Bombay lived as a slave in India many years and learned Hindi. He was emancipated after his owner died, and returned to Africa.

In Africa, Bombay met John Hanning Speke, who asked him to join his expedition to find the source of the Nile River. Bombay and Speke communicated with each other in Hindi, as it was the only language both of them understood. Bombay was well regarded by the British explorers; in the words of Sir Richard Burton, "The gem of the party, however, is one Sidi Mubarak, who has taken to himself the agnomen of 'Bombay.'" Between 1856 and 1876, Bombay participated in expeditions by Speke and other English explorers, including Richard Francis Burton, Henry Morton Stanley and Verney Lovett Cameron. When Stanley went in search of David Livingstone, Bombay was appointed chief of the caravan. In 1873 Bombay walked across the continent of Africa from the East coast to the West Coast.

His role in exploration was recognised by the Royal Geographical Society of London, which presented Bombay a silver medal and a pension in 1876 for his assistance to Speke as they strove to find the source of the Nile River. However, he was never invited to England. Bombay died in Africa in 1885 at the age of 65.
