= Egba =

Egba may refer to:

- Egba people, a clan of the Yoruba people living in western Nigeria
- EGBA, the European Gaming and Betting Association
- Egba United Government, a late 19th century political entity of the Egba people that was located in what is today Nigeria

== See also ==
- Egba Alake, one of the five sections of Egbaland
