= Ed Rice =

American photographer and writer

Edward J. Rice (October 23, 1918 – August 8, 2001) was an American author, publisher, photojournalist and painter, born in Brooklyn, New York to Edward J. Rice, Sr. and Elsie (Becker) Rice. He was best known as a close friend and biographer of Thomas Merton. Rice wrote more than 20 books, including Captain Sir Richard Francis Burton, a best-selling 1990 biography of the famous 19th-century explorer, and was the founder (1953) of Jubilee magazine.

== Life ==
Rice attended Columbia University, where he became close friends with Merton, Robert Lax, and Robert Giroux (who later co-founded Farrar, Straus and Giroux). Rice was editor of the Jester humor magazine in his senior year; he graduated in 1940. He stood godfather for both Merton and Lax when each converted to Catholicism; Merton in 1938, and Lax five years later.

Rice chronicled his friendship with Merton in the 1970 book The Man in the Sycamore Tree: The Good Times and Hard Life of Thomas Merton. Also in 1970, he published John Frum He Come, a book documenting the South Pacific cargo cults.

Rice died August 8, 2001, in Sagaponack, New York USA.
