= John Hanning Speke =

English explorer and army officer (1827–1864)

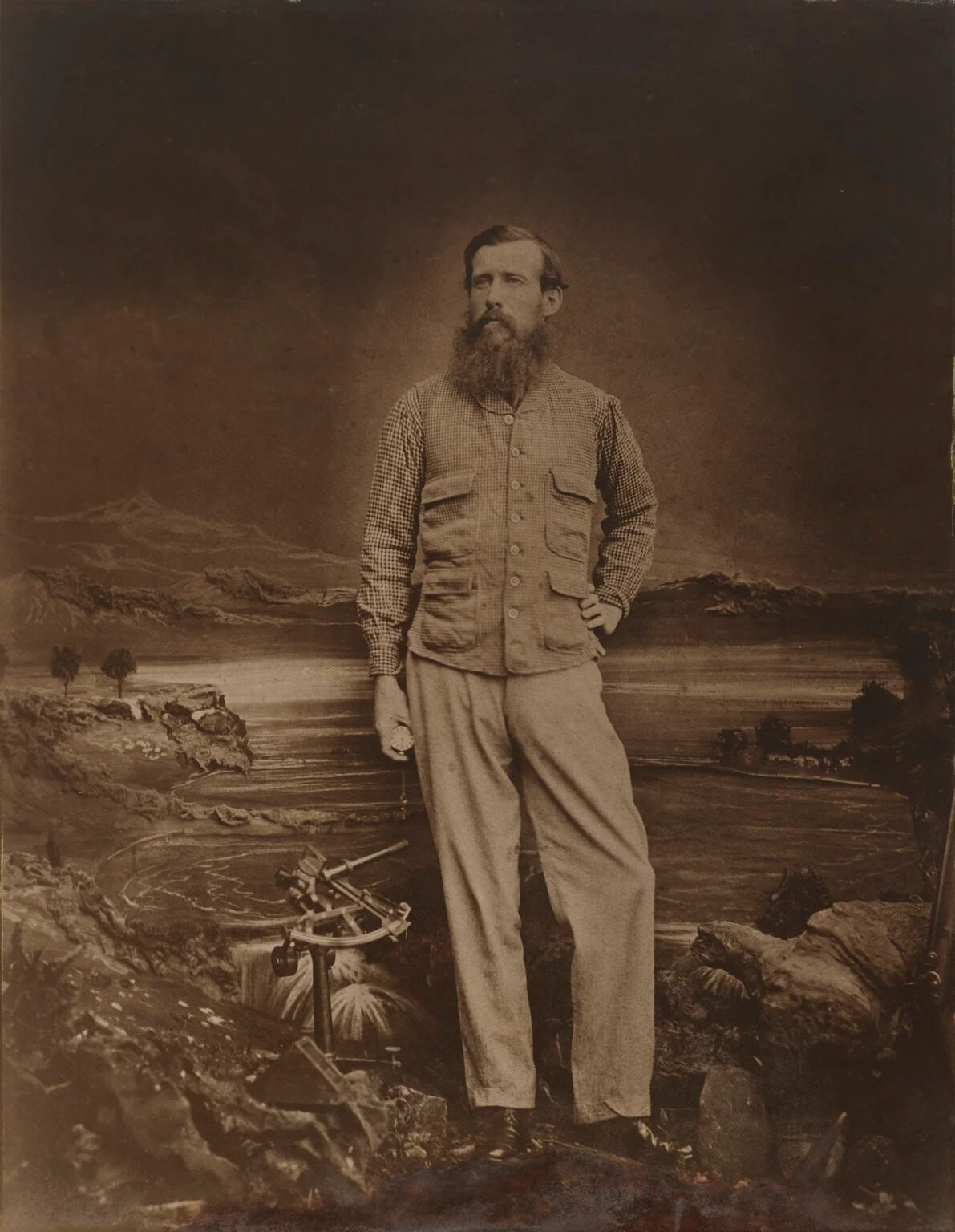
- Speke in 1863
- Born: 4 May 1827; Buckland Brewer, Devon, England
- Died: 15 September 1864 (aged 37); Neston Park, Wiltshire, England
- Burial place: Dowlish Wake, Somerset
- Occupations: Military officer, explorer

Speke's coat of arms: Argent, two bars azure overall an eagle with two heads displayed gules (Speke of Whitelackington) with honourable augmentation a chief azure thereon a representation of flowing water proper superinscribed with the word "Nile" in letters gold

John Hanning Speke (4 May 1827 – 15 September 1864) was an English explorer and army officer who made three exploratory expeditions to Africa. He is most associated with the search for the source of the Nile and, with Richard Burton, was the first European to reach Lake Victoria.

== Life ==
=== Early life ===
Speke was born on 4 May 1827 at Orleigh Court, Buckland Brewer, near Bideford, North Devon. His father was William Speke and an uncle was John Lee Lee.

=== In the British Indian Army ===
In 1844 Speke was commissioned into the Bengal Army and posted to British India, where he served in the 46th Regiment of Bengal Native Infantry under Sir Hugh Gough during the Punjab campaign and under Sir Colin Campbell during the First Anglo-Sikh War. He was promoted lieutenant in 1850 and captain in 1852. He spent his leave exploring the Himalayan Mountains and Mount Everest and once crossed into Tibet.

=== Joining Burton's expedition ===
In 1854 he made his first voyage to Africa, first arriving in Aden to ask permission of the Political Resident of this British Outpost to cross the Gulf of Aden and collect specimens in Somalia for his family's natural history museum in Somerset. This was refused as Somalia was considered rather dangerous. Speke then asked to join an expedition about to leave for Somalia led by the already famous Richard Burton who had Lt William Stroyan and Lt Herne recruited to come along, but a recent death left the expedition one person short. Speke was accepted because he had travelled in remote regions alone before, had experience collecting and preserving natural history specimens and had done astronomical surveying. Initially the party split with Burton going to Harrar, Abyssinia, and Speke going to Wadi Nogal in Somalia.

During this trip Speke experienced trouble with the local guide, who cheated him; after they returned to Aden, Burton, who had also returned, saw that the guide was punished, jailed and killed. This incident probably led to larger troubles later on. Then all four men travelled to Berbera on the coast of Somalia, from where they wanted to trek inland towards the Ogaden.

=== Berbera confrontation ===
While camped outside Berbera, they were attacked at night by 200 spear-wielding Somalis. During this fracas Speke ducked under the flap of a tent to get a clearer view of the scene, and Burton thought he was retreating and called for Speke to stand firm. Speke did so and then charged forward with great courage, shooting several attackers. The misunderstanding laid the foundation of their later disputes and dislikes. Stroyan was killed by a spear, Burton was seriously wounded by a javelin impaling both cheeks and Speke was wounded and captured; Herne came away unwounded. Speke was tied up and stabbed several times with spears, one thrust cutting through his thigh along his femur and exiting. Showing tremendous determination, he used his bound fists to give his attacker a facial punch; this gave him an opportunity to escape, albeit he was followed by a group of Somalis and had to dodge spears as he ran for his life. Rejoining Burton and Herne, the trio eventually managed to escape with a boat passing along the coast. The expedition was a severe financial loss, and Speke's natural history specimens from his earlier leg were used to make up for some of it. Speke handed Burton his diaries, which Burton used as an appendix in his own book on his travels to Harrar. It seemed unlikely that the two would join again and Burton believed that he would never lead an expedition to the interior of Africa, his fervent hope, after this failed journey.

=== Search for the Nile source, 1856–1859 ===
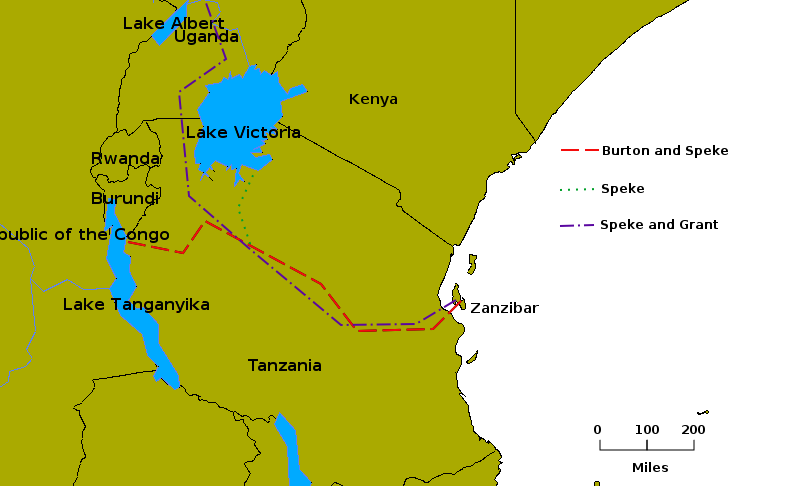
Routes taken by the expeditions of Burton and Speke (1857–1858) and Speke and Grant (1863)

In 1856, Speke and Burton went to East Africa to find the Great Lakes, which were rumoured to exist in the centre of the continent. It was hoped that the expedition would locate the source of the Nile (known to locals as Kiyira in Luganda). The journey, which started from Zanzibar Island in June 1857, where they stayed at the residence of Atkins Hamerton, the British consul, was extremely strenuous and both men fell ill from a variety of tropical diseases once they went inland. Most of the day to day work of exploration was carried out by a large, diverse, and changing labour force of porters, soldiers, guides, and cooks.

By 7 November 1857, they had travelled over 600 miles on foot and donkey and reached Kazeh (Tabora), where they rested and recuperated among Arab slave traders who had a settlement there. In Kazeh Burton became gravely ill and Speke went temporarily blind as they travelled further west. After an arduous journey, the two arrived in Ujiji in February 1858 and became the first Europeans to reach Lake Tanganyika (although Speke was partially blind at this point and could not properly see the lake). They decided to explore the lake, but it was vast and they could get only small canoes from the locals. Burton was too ill to journey, and thus Speke crossed the lake with a small crew and some canoes to try to rent a larger vessel from an Arab who, they were told, had a large boat and lived on the west side of the lake. (Lake Tanganyika is over 400 miles long on the north–south axis but only about 30 miles wide.) During this trip Speke, marooned on an island, suffered severely when he became temporarily deaf after a beetle crawled into his ear and he tried to remove it with a knife. Unable to rent the larger vessel from the Arab, Speke returned. The pair were unable to explore Lake Tanganyika properly and they initially misunderstood that a river flowed out of it from the north side. A few weeks later the explorer and guide Sidi Mubarak Bombay confirmed via locals that the river flowed into the lake; however, since neither man actually saw this river, this remained a source of speculation.

=== Speke's travels to Lake Victoria ===
They had also heard of a second lake to the north-east, and in May 1858, they decided to explore it on the way back to the coast. But Burton was too weak to make the trip and thus stayed in base camp when the main caravan halted again at Kazeh. Speke went on a 47-day side trip that was 452 miles up and down in which he took 34 men with Bombay and Mabruki as his captains and on 30 July 1858 became the first European to see Lake Victoria (known to locals as Nam Lolwe in the Dholuo language and Nnalubaale in the Luganda language or Ukerewe). Speke renamed the lake after the British monarch, Queen Victoria, and was one of the first persons to map it. It was this lake that eventually proved to be the source of the River Nile. However, much of the expedition's survey equipment had been lost at this point and thus vital questions about the height and extent of the lake could not be answered easily. Speke's eyes were still bothering him and he only saw a small part of the southern end of the lake and his view was blocked by islands in the lake so he could not judge the size of the lake well. However, Speke did estimate the elevation of Lake Victoria at 4000 feet by observing the temperature at which water boiled at that level. (This lake's being substantially higher than Lake Tanganyika did make it a more likely candidate for the source of the Nile.)

From the beginning, the relationship of Speke and Burton was one of opposites; Burton considered Speke inferior linguistically and a less experienced traveller in remote regions (which was partially true), but Burton himself appears to have been jealous and far less able to relate to the safari caravan to keep the expedition motivated and moving (a vital factor as they were completely dependent on their safari crew). While Speke enjoyed hunting and thus provided the caravan with meat, Burton was not much interested in such pursuits. Burton was appointed the head of the expedition and considered Speke the second in command, although the pair seemed to have shared the hardships and labours of the journey pretty much evenly. Once it became clear that Speke might have found the source of the Nile the relationship deteriorated further. Why Burton did not journey back to Lake Victoria with Speke to make a better reconnaissance of the Lake after Speke returned to base camp in Kazeh is unclear. Burton was incapacitated and had to be carried by bearers but this had been true for a great deal of the trip.

While Speke and Burton were instrumental in bringing the source of the Nile to the wider world and were the first to record and map this section of Africa, the efforts and labours of Sidi Mubarak Bombay and Mabruki were instrumental in the discovery of the lake. Bombay was captured as a child near Lake Nyasa by slave traders and was sold to Indian merchants on the coast of Africa who took him to Sindh. Thus he spoke Hindustani, and after his master's death he sailed back to Zanzibar, where Speke and Burton met and hired him. Both spoke Hindustani, which greatly facilitated the travel in the interior as Bombay spoke several native languages beside Swahili. Speke was much attached to Bombay and spoke highly of his honesty and conscientiousness. Bombay's efforts in dealing with hostile tribes, interpreting and keeping the safari crew on track, was a great help to the expedition. Less is known of Mabruki, the other caravan leader, but he was later known as Mabruki Speke, and like Bombay became one of East Africa's great caravan leaders and was also a member of the Yao tribe like Bombay. Because of Speke's recommendations, both Bombay and Mabruki served on Henry Stanley's 1871 expedition to find Livingstone.

=== Return to England and debate over the source of the Nile ===
On 26 September 1858 the return journey from Kazeh was started with 152 porters; both men had to return as their military leaves were coming to an end, although Jeal contends that they could have extended the trip by asking for an extension, as their clear mission statement of the Royal Geographical Society (RGS) was to find the source of the Nile. The expedition had lost a great many people through desertions, disease and hostilities, but in Kazeh, on the return journey, Mabruki had recruited local porters. Again Speke and Burton suffered from severe illnesses and had to be carried in a litter (machilla) by the porters some of the way. Once Speke and Burton were back on the coast they went by ship to Zanzibar and then travelled to Aden. Once in Aden, Burton was not granted a medical certificate to travel and thus Speke left on HMS Furious and arrived in England on 8 May 1859. Burton was not far behind and he arrived on 21 May 1859. When back at the coast Burton had written a letter to Norton Shaw of the Royal Geographical Society (which had partially sponsored the journey) in which Burton enclosed a map of Lake Victoria made by Speke and wrote "there are grave reasons for believing it (the lake) to be the source of the principal feeder of the White Nile".

Now further disagreements developed; Burton maintained that they had promised each other in Aden not to make public announcements till they both were back in England and Burton accused Speke of a breach of promise for publicly claiming that the source of the Nile was found on their trip. Burton now turned against the theory that Lake Victoria was the source of the Nile (and now said the river flowing out of the north side of Lake Tanganyika was the source) and thus also reversed himself from the position he took in the letter to Norton Shaw. In that same letter to Shaw, Burton had also stated that Speke would present his findings to the RGS, as he was prevented from travelling because of poor health and would be in England a short time after Speke. Jeal concludes that Burton's claim of a promise from Speke not to go to the RGS was improbable. The jealousies and accusations between the two men got ever greater, further inflamed by their respective circles of friends and people who stood to gain from the feud such as book publishers and newspapers. Burton was still extremely weak, and once he appeared in front of a committee of the RGS he was not able to make a convincing case for his leading a second expedition to settle the outstanding matters about the Nile. The rift widened, and perhaps became irreversible, when Speke was chosen to lead a subsequent expedition instead of Burton. The two presented joint papers concerning the expedition to the Royal Geographical Society on 13 June 1859.

=== Second journey to the source of the Nile, 1860–1861 ===
Together with James Augustus Grant, Speke left Portsmouth on 27 April 1860 and departed from Zanzibar in October 1860. The expedition approached the lake from the south west but Grant was often sick and was not able to travel with Speke much of the time. As during the first trip, in this period of history, Arab slave traders had created an atmosphere of great distrust towards any foreigners entering central Africa, and most tribes either fled or fought when encountering them as they assumed all outsiders to be potential slavers. Lacking a great deal of guns and soldiers, the only thing the expedition could do was make peace offerings to locals, and both men were severely delayed and their supplies depleted by demands for gifts and passage fees by smaller local chieftains. After numerous months of delays Speke reached Lake Victoria on 28 July 1862, and then travelled on the west side around Lake Victoria but only seeing it from time to time; but on the north side of the lake, Speke found the Nile flowing out of it and discovered the Ripon Falls.

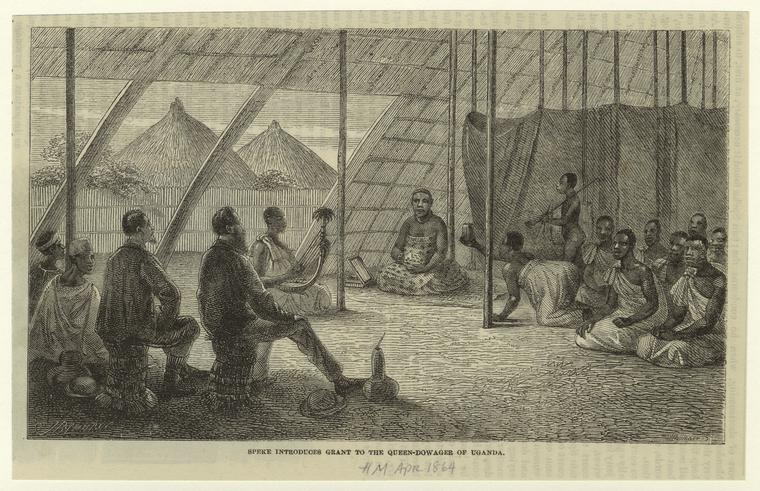
Speke introduces Grant to the Queen-Dowager of Buganda

Local Church Missionary Society records indicate that Speke fathered a daughter whilst staying at the court of Muteesa I the Kabaka (or King) of Buganda. Whilst staying at the court Speke was given two girls aged about 12 and 18 from the entourage of the Queen Mother. Speke appears to have had sexual relations with both of them, before handing over the youngest (whom he named 'Kahala') to another man. Speke fell in love with the elder girl, 'Meri', according to his diaries (which were redacted when they were published as books later). While Meri proved loyal to Speke and fulfilled her task at being a "wife" to him as commanded by the Queen Mother, Speke was distressed because he thought she had no love or deep attachment to him. He "divorced her on the spot" in April 1862 after she defied his orders regarding the sacrifice of a goat. Whilst Meri visited Speke several times after this incident, the couple did not reconcile. Speke claimed to have tried to arrange a better relationship for Meri with another man, without success it seems.

Finally, given permission by Muteesa in June 1862 to leave, Speke then travelled down the Nile now reunited with Grant. Because of travel restrictions placed by the local chieftains, slave raiding parties, tribal wars and the difficulty of the terrain, Speke was not able to map the entire flow of the Nile from Lake Victoria north. Why he did not make more efforts to do so is not clear, but the enormous hardships of the journey must have played a large role. By January 1863 Speke and Grant reached Gondokoro in Southern Sudan, where he met Samuel Baker and his "wife". (Her name was Florence von Sass and she had been rescued by Baker from a slave market in Vidin during a hunting trip in Bulgaria.) Speke had expected to meet John Petherick and his wife Katherine at Gondokoro, as they had been sent by the RGS south along the Nile to meet Speke and Grant. However the Pethericks were not there but on a side expedition to trade ivory, as they had run out of funds for their expedition. This caused some hard feelings between Petherick and Speke, and Baker played into this so he could assume a greater role as an explorer and co-discoverer of the Nile. Speke, via Baker's ship, then continued to Khartoum from which he sent a celebrated telegram to London: "The Nile is settled."

Speke's expedition did not resolve the issue, however. Burton claimed that because Speke had not followed the Nile from the place it flowed out of Lake Victoria to Gondokoro, he could not be sure they were the same river.

Baker and Florence, meanwhile, stayed in Gondokoro and tried to settle the flow of the river from there to Lake Victoria by travelling south. They eventually, after tremendous hardships, such as being wracked by fevers and held up by rulers for months on end, found Lake Albert and the Murchison Falls.

== Return to London and third expedition ==
Speke and Grant now returned to England, where they arrived in June 1863 and were welcomed as genuine heroes. This did not last long in Speke's case however; disputes with Burton, who was relentless in his criticisms and a very compelling public speaker and gifted writer, left Speke's discoveries in less than an ideal light. Speke had also committed to write a book for John Blackwood which he found hard and time-consuming as he was not naturally a gifted writer. He failed to give a good and full report to the RGS for many months and thus in effect was not defending his positions of discovery. In addition Speke had a public dispute with the Pethericks who had by and large acted according to their RGS instructions but Speke had felt they had not.

All this led Roderick Murchison, president of the Royal Geographical Society, to start disliking Speke and a third expedition, led by Speke, was becoming less likely as it would have to be funded by the people Speke was now not on good terms with. It appears that just as Burton had overplayed his hand after the first trip Speke now did the same. Now the RGS asked that a public debate should be held between Speke and Burton to try and settle the Nile's source.

== Death ==
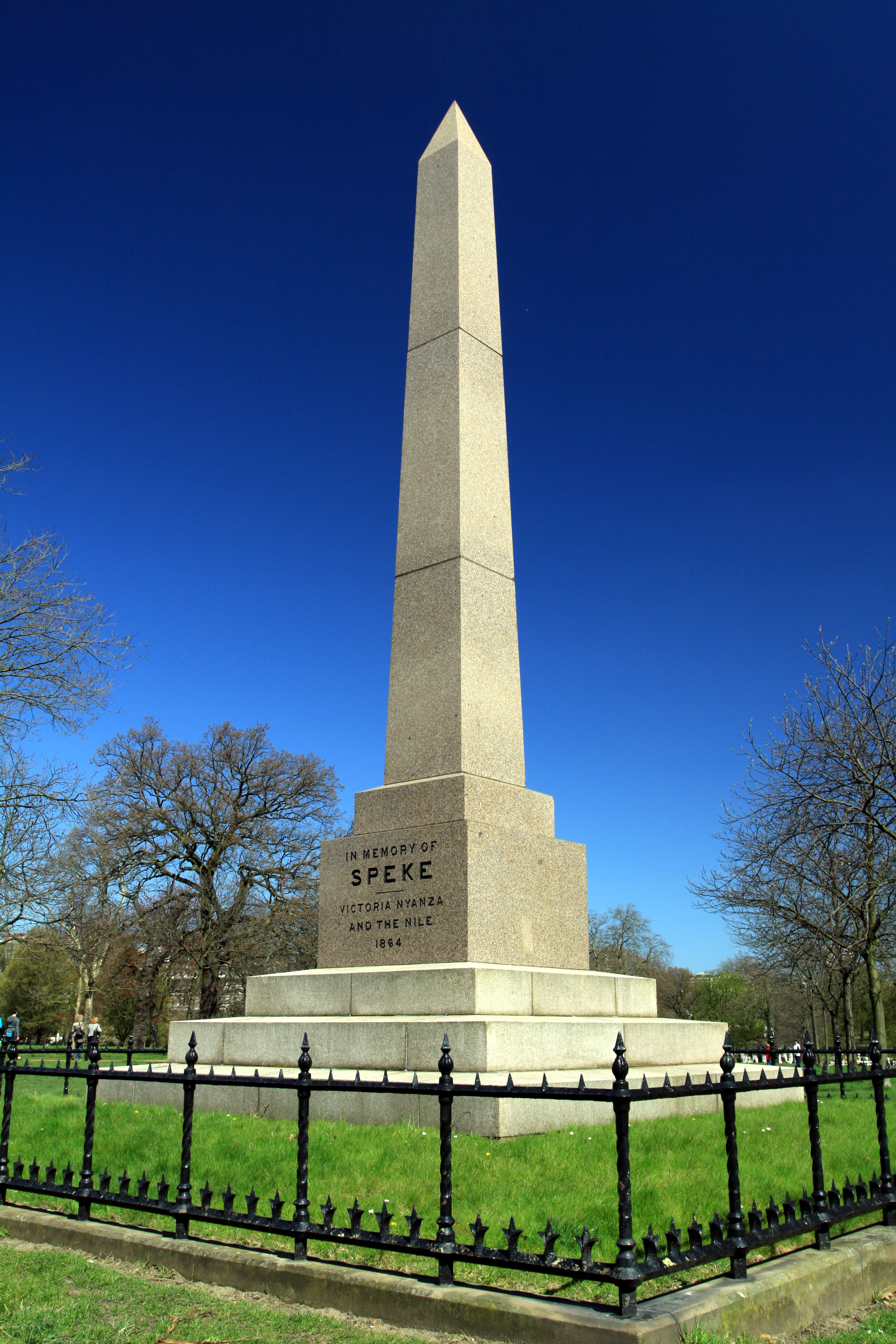
An obelisk dedicated to Speke stands in Kensington Gardens, London

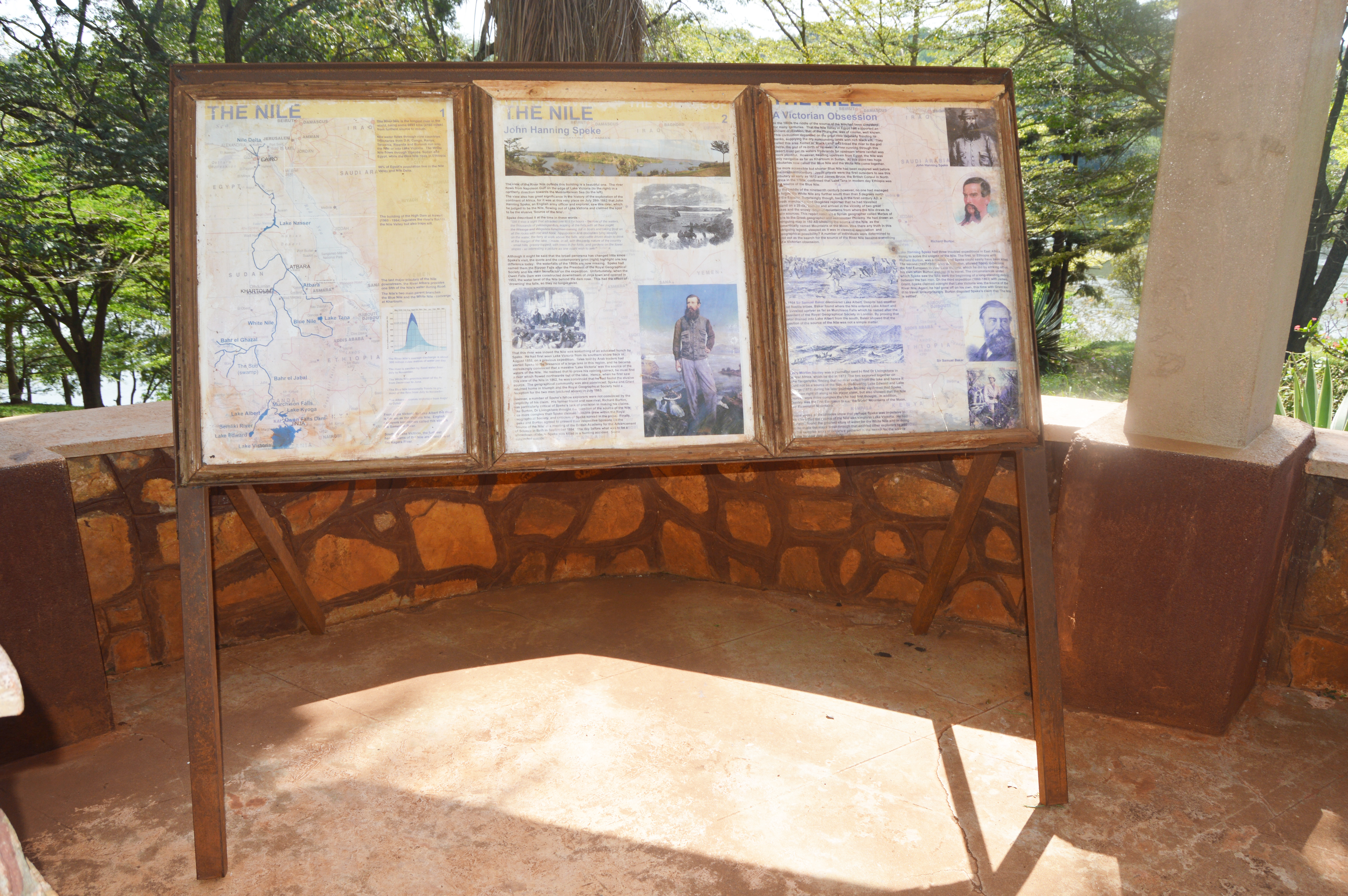
Speke monument in Uganda

A debate was planned between Speke and Burton before the geographical section of the British Association in Bath on 16 September 1864, but Speke had died the previous afternoon from a possibly self-inflicted gunshot wound while shooting at Neston Park in Wiltshire. A contemporary account of the events surrounding his death appeared in The Times:

At about 2.30 p.m. on the same day [15 September 1864] Speke set out from his uncle's house in company with his cousin, George Fuller, and a gamekeeper, Daniel Davis, for an afternoon's shooting in Neston Park. He fired both barrels in the course of the afternoon and about 4 p.m. Davis was marking birds for the two guns who were about 60 yards apart. Speke was seen to climb onto a stone wall about 2 feet high: for the moment he was without his gun. A few seconds later there was a report and when George Fuller rushed up Speke's gun was found behind the wall in the field into which Speke had jumped. The right barrel was at half-cock: only the left barrel was discharged. Speke, who was bleeding seriously, was sensible for a few minutes and said feebly, "Don't move me." George Fuller went for assistance leaving Davis to attend him; but Speke survived for only about 15 minutes, and when Mr. Snow, surgeon of Box, arrived he was already dead. There was a single wound in his left side such as would be made by a cartridge if the muzzle of the gun—a Lancaster breech-loader without a safety guard—were close to the body; the charge had passed upwards through the lungs dividing all the large blood vessels over the heart, though missing the heart itself.

An inquest concluded that the death was accidental, a conclusion supported by his only biographer Alexander Maitland, though the idea of suicide has appealed to some. Bearing in mind, however, that the fatal wound was just below Speke's armpit, suicide seems most unlikely. Burton, however, could not set aside his own strong dislike of Speke and was vocal in spreading the idea of a suicide, claiming that Speke feared the debate. Speke was buried in St Andrew's Church, Dowlish Wake in Somerset, five miles away from the ancestral home of the Speke family. There is a red granite obelisk monument to Speke in Kensington Gardens, London.

== Source of the Nile is settled, 1874–1877 ==
In 1874–1877, Henry Stanley mounted a new expedition and took a boat along the entire shore of Lake Victoria; he established that Lake Tanganyika and the Nile were not connected in any way, and he explored the headwaters of Lake Edward. It was now proven that Speke had been right all along, and that the Nile flowed from Lake Victoria via Ripon Falls and Murchison Falls to Lake Albert and from there to Gondokoro.

According to other theories, the source of the White Nile, even after centuries of exploration, remains in dispute. The most remote source that is indisputably a source for the White Nile is the Kagera River, which was explored by German explorer Oscar Baumann, and geographically determined in 1937 by Burkhart Waldecker; however, the Kagera has tributaries that are in contention for the farthest source of the White Nile.

=== Scientific works ===
- Journal of the Discovery of the Source of the Nile. Blackwood and Sons. 1863.

Much of Speke's Journal of the Discovery of the Source of the Nile is a description of the physical features of Africa's races, in whose condition he found "a strikingly existing proof of the Holy Scriptures". Living alongside the locals, Speke claimed to have found a "superior race" of "men who were as unlike as they could be from the common order of the natives" due to their "fine oval faces, large eyes, and high noses, denoting the best blood of Abyssinia" that is, Ethiopia. This "race" comprised many tribes, including the Watusi (Tutsi). Speke described their physical appearances as having retained – despite the hair-curling and skin-darkening effects of intermarriage – "a high stamp of Asiatic feature, of which a marked characteristic is a bridged instead of bridgeless nose".

== Legacy ==
=== Eponyms ===
Two species of African reptiles are named in his honour: Speke's hinge-back tortoise, Kinixys spekii; and Speke's sand lizard, Heliobolus spekii. Three species of African mammals are named in his honour: the sitatunga, Tragelaphus spekii; Speke's gazelle, Gazella spekei; and Speke's pectinator, Pectinator spekei. Some streets and avenues in South Africa and Zimbabwe were named after him. The bar at the five-star Sonesta hotel in Nasr City, Cairo, was named after him when it opened in 1982; the then-manager came from the same town as Speke.

=== Film ===
- The BBC miniseries The Search for the Nile (1971) tells the story of the Nile expeditions during the second half of the 19th century in a detailed way.
- The film Mountains of the Moon (1990), starring Scottish actor Iain Glen as Speke, related the story of the Burton-Speke controversy, portrayed as having been unjustifiably incited by Speke's publisher to stimulate book sales.

=== Fiction ===
William Boyd presents a portrait of Speke in a fictional reimagining of the search for the source of the Nile in his 2022 novel, The Romantic.
