= William Harrison (author) =

American novelist

William Neal Harrison (October 29, 1933 – October 22, 2013) was an American novelist, short story writer, and screenwriter.

Three films were based on two of his works: The short story "Roller Ball Murder" was turned into a screenplay for the 1975 film Rollerball, with a remake in 2002. The novel Burton and Speke was turned into the 1990 film Mountains of the Moon.

Five of his novels are set in Africa and his three volumes of short stories contain most of his fifty published stories. Many of his stories that appeared in Esquire and the novel Africana were experimental in tone. His fiction is distinguished by the exotic and sometimes hostile settings in which he places his characters.

David Black, a reviewer for The Nation wrote, "Burton and Speke…has a quality that is even rarer than excellence: it is a likable book, one of those uncommon novels you will carry with you in your imagination long after turning the final page."

== Personal background ==
Harrison was the adopted son of Samuel Scott and Mary Harrison, and grew up in Dallas, Texas, attending public schools. His mother read widely, kept elaborate scrapbooks featuring both family members and celebrities, and wrote devotional poetry.

Harrison attended Texas Christian University, where he became editor of the campus newspaper, The Skiff, and began to write. He later attended Vanderbilt University where he studied to teach comparative religion at the divinity school, but once again he began to write and made lifelong friends in the Department of English. After a year teaching in North Carolina at Atlantic Christian College, he moved his young family to Iowa where he studied in the creative writing program for ten months. At Iowa he sold his first short story to Esquire and published reviews in The Saturday Review.

In 1964, Harrison moved with his family to Fayetteville, Arkansas, where he published his first novels and in 1966 became the founder and co-director of the Master of Fine Arts program at the University of Arkansas with his colleague James Whitehead. Many American and European writers and poets came as visitors to their program and their students went on to publish hundreds of books of poetry and fiction in major New York and university publishing houses.

Harrison also served on the original board of directors (1970–75) for the Associated Writing Programs during the great growth period of creative writing in American literary education. He was also on the board of advisors for the Natural and Cultural Heritage Commission for the State of Arkansas (1976–81).

Harrison received a Guggenheim Memorial Fellowship in Fiction (1973), a National Endowment for the Arts Grant for Fiction (1977), the Christopher Award for Television (1970) and a Columbia School of Journalism Prize with Esquire Magazine (1971). He has been represented in Who’s Who in America since 1975. His stories have been anthologized in The Best American Short Stories (1968), Southern Writing in the Sixties (1967), All Our Secrets Are the Same: New Fiction from Esquire (1977), The Literature of Sport (1980), The Best American Mystery Stories (2006), New Stories from the South (2006), Fifty Years of Descant (2008) and numerous textbooks.

Merlee was Harrison's wife of more than fifty years, and his children are Laurie, singer/songwriter Sean Harrison and Quentin. He lived in Fayetteville until his death, although he traveled widely in Africa, China, the Middle East and Europe. He was a longtime baseball fan and Chicago Cubs supporter. He was an active fly fisherman and played tennis and golf.

His heroes were Anton Chekhov, Joseph Conrad, Scott Fitzgerald, Ernest Hemingway and John Cheever, but he taught hundreds of fine authors in his classes and offered seminars on James Joyce, Vladimir Nabokov, Federico Fellini and others.

== Novels ==
- The Theologian (1965)
- In a Wild Sanctuary (1969)
- Lessons in Paradise (1971)
- Africana (1976)
- Pretty Baby (1978), novelization.
- Savannah Blue (1979)
- Brubaker (1980), novelization of the screenplay by W.D. Richter and Arthur Ross
- Burton and Speke (1982)
- Three Hunters (1989)
- The Blood Latitudes (2000)
- Black August (2011)

== Short story collections ==
- Roller Ball Murder and Other Stories (1975)
- The Buddha in Malibu: Stories (1998)
- Texas Heat and Other Stories (2005)

== Non-fiction ==
- The Mutations of Rollerball: Essays (2010)

== Screenplays ==
- Rollerball (1975) directed by Norman Jewison for United Artists
- Mountains of the Moon (1990) directed by Bob Rafelson for Carolco/Tri-Star
