= Buzz Feitshans =

American film producer (born 1937)

- Born: Frederick Rollin Feitshans III; January 17, 1937 (age 89)
- Education: University of Southern California
- Occupation: Film producer
- Spouses: Charlotte Wells (div. 1978); Raffaella De Laurentiis
- Father: Fred R. Feitshans Jr.

Frederick Rollin Feitshans III (born 17 January 1937), known as Buzz Feitshans, is an American film producer best known for his work in the action field and his collaborations with John Milius and Carolco Pictures.

== Biography ==
Feitshans graduated from the University of Southern California in 1962 with a degree in education, then went to work for the American Broadcasting Company as a film editor. In 1964, he joined American International Pictures as an editor and became head of the editorial department for ten years.

In 1973, Feitshans made his debut as a producer with Dillinger, a film written and directed by John Milius. Milius and Feitshans formed A-Team Productions that same year and produced Big Wednesday (1978), 1941 (1979) and Hardcore (1979). A-Team Productions dissolved, but Feitshans continued to act as Milius' producer on Conan the Barbarian (1982), Uncommon Valor (1983), and Red Dawn (1984).

Feitshans produced First Blood in 1982, and also its first two sequels. The films were made by executive producers Mario Kassar and Andrew Vajna of Carolco Pictures, whom Feitshans frequently worked with. In 1988, he became executive vice president of production and a member of the board of directors for Carolco Pictures.

Feitshans joined Cinergi Productions in 1992, serving as executive producer for Medicine Man (1992), Tombstone (1993), Renaissance Man (1994), Color of Night (1994), Die Hard with a Vengeance (1995), Judge Dredd (1995), The Scarlet Letter (1995), Nixon (1995), Evita (1996), Shadow Conspiracy (1997), and An Alan Smithee Film: Burn Hollywood Burn (1997).

He retired from film production in 1997.

== Personal life ==
Feitshans is the son of Lotus Grant Feitshans (1909–2007) and film editor Fred R. Feitshans Jr. (1909–1987).

He is the grandson of Sennett Bathing Beauty Ora Carew and Harry E. Grant on his mother's side and tennis player Frederick Rollin Feitshans and Celia Traber Feitshans on his father's.

He married Charlotte Wells (divorced 1978) and Raffaella De Laurentiis.

He is the father of four, including cinematographer Fred "Buzz" Feitshans IV (born 1959).

== Select credits ==
He was a producer in all films unless otherwise noted.

=== Film ===
Year	Film	Credit	Notes
1973	Coffy		Uncredited
1973	Dillinger		
1974	Foxy Brown		
1974	Act of Vengeance		
1978	Big Wednesday		
1979	Hardcore		
1979	1941		
1982	Conan the Barbarian		
1982	First Blood		
1983	Uncommon Valor		
1984	Red Dawn		
1985	Rambo: First Blood Part II		
1987	Extreme Prejudice		
1988	Rambo III		
1990	Total Recall		
1993	Tombstone	Executive producer	
1994	Renaissance Man	Executive producer	
1994	Color of Night		
1995	Die Hard with a Vengeance	Executive producer	
1997	Shadow Conspiracy	Executive producer	

As cinematographer

Year	Film
2004	Joe Killionaire

Camera and electrical department

Year	Film	Role	Notes
2000	Dragonheart: A New Beginning	Camera operator	Direct-to-video

Editorial department

Year	Film	Role
1967	Thunder Alley	Assistant film editor
1968	Wild in the Streets	Assistant editor
1969	De Sade	Editorial coordinator

Miscellaneous crew

Year	Film	Role	Notes
1969	The Devil's 8	Post-production coordinator	
1973	Slaughter's Big Rip-Off	Production executive	Uncredited
1975	Hard Times	Production executive	

As editor

Year	Film	Ref.
1972	Boxcar Bertha	

==== Unmade projects ====
- Amanda (1996)
- Broadway Brawler
- Crusade
- Smoke and Mirrors

=== Television ===
As cinematographer

Year	Title	Role	Notes
2004	Las Vegas	Director of photography	
2007	Supreme Courtships		Television pilot

Camera and electrical department

Year	Title	Role
2004	Las Vegas	Camera operator
