= Your Ticket Is No Longer Valid =

- Directed by: George Kaczender
- Written by: Leila Basen; Ian McLellan Hunter
- Based on: Novel by Romain Gary
- Produced by: Robert Lantos; Stephen J. Roth; Executive: Mario Kassar; Andrew Vajna
- Starring: Richard Harris; George Peppard; Jennifer Dale; Jeanne Moreau
- Cinematography: Miklós Lente
- Music by: Michel Legrand
- Production company: Films RSL
- Release date: 1981
- Country: Canada
- Language: English
- Budget: $6 million

Your Ticket is No Longer Valid is a 1981 Canadian film directed by George Kaczender and starring Richard Harris, George Peppard, Jennifer Dale, and Jeanne Moreau. Harris later regarded the film as one of the biggest artistic disappointments of his career.

== Plot ==
A businessman (portrayed by Richard Harris) has a younger girlfriend who loves him. He struggles to be able to perform in bed. He gets aroused however at the thought of his girlfriend being made love to by a handsome thief. The businessman becomes obsessed with tracking down the thief.

== Production ==
The film was based on a novel by Romain Gary which was optioned by producer Robert Lantos. His assistant Leila Basen wrote a draft of the script. She later recalled:

If the book was totally sexist, the first draft screenplay written by an American writer was even more misogynist and I said as much to Robert. There never was a script contract. Robert continued to pay me my executive assistant salary of $350 a week. I sat in my usual desk in a room with the other four secretaries. But instead of writing lunch orders, I was writing what was to become the biggest-budget Canadian film of that time. In lieu of money, I got an IBM Selectric II, a free trip to Paris, where some of the film was shot, and tons of experience screenwriter-wise. I learned how to sit in silence in a read-through, even when your dialogue was being massacred. I learned what it means when a director says no one cares what you think because "you're only the writer." And I learned that when Richard Harris wanted a line change there was no point arguing with him because he was going to change it on set anyway.

Harris' fee was $1 million. The film was shot in 1979 in Canada and Paris. It was part financed by Carolco Pictures.

Harris recalled, "I saw the rough cut of the picture - it was 2 1/2 hours long... and it was magic. Sheer dynamite stuff. Well, the producers... they recut it, decided to take an hour out of it. It was a disaster."

== Cast ==
- Richard Harris as Jason Ogilvy
- Jennifer Dale as Laura
- George Peppard as Jim Daley
- Jeanne Moreau as Lili Marlene
- Winston Rekert as Antonio Montoya
- Alexandra Stewart as Clara
- Jan Rubes as Psychiatrist

== Reception ==
Filmink called the film "wild".
