= I Spy (2002 film) =

2002 film by Betty Thomas

- Theatrical release poster
- Directed by: Betty Thomas
- Screenplay by: Cormac Wibberley Marianne Wibberley; Jay Scherick; David Ronn
- Story by: Cormac Wibberley; Marianne Wibberley
- Based on: I Spy by Morton Fine; David Friedkin
- Produced by: Mario Kassar; Andrew G. Vajna; Betty Thomas; Jenno Topping
- Starring: Eddie Murphy; Owen Wilson; Famke Janssen; Malcolm McDowell
- Cinematography: Oliver Wood
- Edited by: Peter Teschner
- Music by: Richard Gibbs
- Production companies: Columbia Pictures; Tall Trees Productions; C2 Pictures; Sheldon Leonard Productions
- Distributed by: Sony Pictures Releasing
- Release date: November 1, 2002
- Running time: 97 minutes
- Language: English
- Budget: $70 million
- Box office: $60.3 million

I Spy (commonly styled I-SPY) is a 2002 American buddy spy comedy film directed by Betty Thomas, and starring Eddie Murphy and Owen Wilson. The film is based on the television series of the same name that aired in the 1960s and starred Robert Culp and Bill Cosby. The plot follows a spy and a famous civilian boxer who go undercover to prevent a gun runner from selling a stolen stealth bomber to the highest bidder.

The film was released by Sony Pictures Releasing in the United States on November 1, 2002. It received negative reviews from critics and audiences, and was a box-office flop, only grossing $60.3 million against its $70 million production budget.

== Plot ==
At Bureau of National Security headquarters, Special Agent Alex Scott is accosted by rival, Carlos, before his next mission's briefing. Alex has to recover a prototype stolen fighter, the "Switchblade," sold to arms dealer Arnold Gundars.

Gundars is sponsoring middleweight world boxing champion Kelly Robinson's next match as a cover to auction the plane. The BNS has contacted Kelly and assigned him to be a civilian cover for Alex's mission. Together they travel to Budapest, where Alex plans to penetrate Gundars' compound during a pre-fight party, and he gives Kelly a contact lens gadget that allows him to see what Alex sees. Arriving in Budapest, Kelly is kidnapped as a test from the BNS, which he passes by not revealing Alex's identity (in reality he simply forgot Alex's name). At the party, Kelly replaces Gundars' pen with a duplicate with a tracking device before confronting his European challenger in the party's boxing ring as a diversion. Alex, posing as a member of Kelly's entourage, enters Gundars' private office and hacks his computer. Kelly unexpectedly arrives, tripping an alarm. They are forced to escape and manage to evade their pursuers by hiding in the sewer, where they begin to bond.

Returning to base, Kelly helps Alex try to seduce Agent Rachel Wright by feeding him lines from the Marvin Gaye song "Sexual Healing". Alex apparently succeeds, but is interrupted by movement on the pen tracking device. They track Gundars to a bathhouse, which Alex believes is a dead end. Kelly has a hunch that the plane is hidden in the building, leading them into a gunfight with Gundars' men. Gundars speeds off in his car, with Rachel in pursuit. Her car explodes and Alex blames Kelly for her death. They engage in a public confrontation leading to Kelly's arrest. Alex returns to the base to find it ransacked, and he convinces the BNS to continue the operation.

Kelly reaches the arena just in time for his fight. Alex finds the Switchblade's hiding location atop a bridge. He surprises Gundars and the terrorists before being disarmed by Rachel, who reveals herself as a double agent. As she tortures Alex for the Switchblade's activation codes, Alex accidentally activates the contact lens gadget allowing Kelly to see the dilemma as he battles his opponent in the ring. He gets knocked down for the first time in his career, but recovers, defeats his opponent, and heads for the bridge. Kelly arrives and sets off a firefight, killing many of the terrorists. After Carlos lands by parachute, he infers that Carlos is also corrupt. When Carlos provokes Kelly, he knocks him out. Kelly shoots the remaining terrorists, while their leader, Zhu Tam, and Gundars are both killed by Rachel.

Once all terrorists are dead, Rachel fabricates a lie that the BNS suspected Carlos was corrupt, so they pretended to team up with him to catch him and convince the others that she is innocent. The confusion leads to a fight between Alex and Carlos, allowing Rachel to escape with Gundars' briefcase. Alex and Kelly attempt to fly the Switchblade away, but it crashes into the river due to its gas tank having been punctured during the firefight. While in the water, the pair discover that the terrorists had attached a nuclear weapon to the fighter. Alex realizes the mission is a success after all, and Kelly remarks that he will be recognized as a hero.

Later, Alex and Kelly track down and arrest Rachel in Monte Carlo. Alex finds a copy of USA Today with a picture of Carlos in a parade with President Bush. Kelly takes this news hard, refusing to accompany Alex to BNS headquarters for a mission debrief. Alex tells him the agency has perfected a jelly-like substance which allows its wearer to float through the air. Kelly happily agrees to go, and Alex tells another agent to get some jars of jelly and two parachutes.

== Cast ==
- Eddie Murphy as Kelly Robinson
- Owen Wilson as Special Agent Alex Scott
- Famke Janssen as Special Agent Rachel Wright
- Malcolm McDowell as Arnold Gundars
- Gary Cole as Agent Carlos
- Phill Lewis as Jerry
- Bill Mondy as Mack McIntyre
- Mike Dopud as Jim
- Lynda Boyd as Edna
- Dana Lee as Zhu Tam
- Viv Leacock as T.J.
- Crystal Lowe as Beautiful Girl
- Darren Shahlavi as Cedric Mills
- Gábor Demszky as himself

== Production ==
In September 1995, it was reported that Cinergi Pictures had acquired the feature film rights to I Spy for $500,000 against $1.75 million. David Caruso was reportedly considered as one of the leads early on in development. In March 1998, it was reported Will Smith was interested in playing one of the leads. In March 2000, it was reported Cormac and Marianne Wibberley had been hired to write the screenplay for the film which was set up with Columbia Pictures as a potential franchise. In February 2001, it was reported that Eddie Murphy and Owen Wilson would be starring in the film with Betty Thomas directing.

== Release ==
I Spy ranked third at the box office behind The Santa Clause 2 and The Ring during its first weekend, collecting $12.7 million. Made on a $70 million budget, the film brought in $33.6 million domestically and $26.7 million internationally, for a total of $60.3 million worldwide. It was the third box-office bomb of 2002 for Murphy, following Showtime and The Adventures of Pluto Nash.

== Reception ==
Review aggregator Rotten Tomatoes reports that 15% of 135 critics have given the film a positive review; the average rating was 4.1/10. The site's critics consensus reads: "Insipid and mirthless, I Spy bears little resemblance to the TV series that inspired it." Metacritic assigned the film a weighted average score of 35 out of 100, based on 31 critics, indicating "generally unfavorable" reviews. Audiences polled by CinemaScore gave the film an average grade of "B" on an A+ to F scale.

Roger Ebert of the Chicago Sun-Times rated it two out of four stars and wrote, "This is a remake by the numbers, linking a halfwit plot to a series of standup routines in which Wilson and Murphy show how funny they could have been in a more ambitious movie."

The film was nominated for three Razzie Awards: Worst Remake, Worst Actor for Eddie Murphy, and Worst Screen Couple for Murphy and Owen Wilson.
