= Manex Visual Effects =

US visual effects company

- Industry: motion picture special visual effects
- Headquarters: United States,

Manex Visual Effects (MVFX) (formerly known as Mass.Illusions) was a special visual effects legendary, East Coast visual effects house based in Lenoxdale, Massachusetts. Formed in the 1990s, they were best known for winning an Academy Award for their groundbreaking visual effects on the 1999 sci-fi classic The Matrix, most notably creating the iconic "Bullet Time" sequence. Though a small company active only for a short period of time, it provided visual effects for a number of high-profile movies and the company received international recognition including two Best Visual Effects Oscars and one Academy Award for Technical Achievement. As the company that created bullet time for The Matrix their work has been highly influential and still is referenced in many media outlets as recently as November 2022.

== History ==
=== Founding and first works ===
In 1995, Cinergi Pictures acquired an effects company from visual effects pioneer Doug Trumbull. It was originally known as Cinergi F/X, but was subsequently named Mass Illusions. Mass.Illusion operated as a special-effects house owned by Cinergi, an independent movie studio. By 1997, Cinergi needed to sell Mass.Illusion for financial reasons, and began looking for investors to buy the company. Mass.Illusion had $1 million in debt, but had assets including artists and a $7.5 million contract to produce What Dreams May Come special effects. It had also submitted well-received test shots for The Matrix. In 1997, Cinergi pulled out of Mass Illusion. The company was rescued from liquidation by the Columbus, Ohio based company Manchester Exchange & Investment Company Inc, (or Manex Group), with Manex agreeing to assume the firm's debt. Robert Bobo began running the company in November 1997. In 1998, it was renamed, to Manex Visual Effects (MVFX), headed by managing director Robert Bobo. In August 1997, it was moved to Alameda Naval Air Station.

In 1998, Manex completed work on the movie What Dreams May Come. This featured an extended sequence in which the character played by Robin Williams entered a painted world. Manex provided the visual effects for this sequence and partly as a result of this work the movie was awarded an Academy Award for Visual Effects. In 1999, Manex's creative director received an Oscar for What Dreams May Come.

In 1999, Manex completed work on The Matrix which received an Academy Award. The team at Manex, led by John Gaeta, created the signature bullet time sequences from the movie. They also developed a system for image-based rendering allowing choreographed camera movements through computer graphic reconstructed sets (also known as Virtual Cinematography) for which Manex was awarded an Academy Award for Technical Achievement.

In November 1998, Manex filed for injunctive relief against three individuals claiming to be shareholders. They sued Manex and Managing Director Robert Bobo, arguing he had defrauded them and was using the company for personal gain. Plaintiffs included Michael Van Himbergen, Roger Davis, and Steven Gillam. After losing in their initial efforts, the three plaintiffs settled for an undisclosed sum in a swap for public stock owned by them that was transferred to Manex Entertainment in March 2000. Robert Bobo was free thereafter to try to sell Manex for about $20 million if desired. Bobo stressed at the time that the company was not being sold and was instead upgrading and bringing in investors. The company did raise a significant amount of investment and continued to expand but was eventually sold by Bobo and management to an investor group from Trenton, New Jersey. After that, Bobo and key management left with no further contracts awarded to the company.

=== Expansion and acquisitions ===
In 1999, Manex expanded, acquiring the Los Angeles operations of the Computer Film Company. The company underwent reorganization including the formation on an interactive division headed by Bill Dawson, formerly of Softnet, Xoom.com and Apple. Dawson recruited Kawika Maszak, also from Softnet and formerly of Gannett, as the division's executive producer. Manex Interactive received a New York International Independent Film & Video Festival award for its experimental short film Seriality.

Another division, Manex Studios, also converted thousands of square feet in old hangar space to film studios where dozens of commercials, special events and feature films were shot.

The firm designed effects for the 2000 movies Romeo Must Die and Mission: Impossible 2. Manex further developed their virtual cinematography work in movies such as Michael Jordan to the Max in 2000. In February 2000, the firm announced it had hired a veteran from Industrial Light & Magic as its president, and had garnered millions in investment capital. In May 2000, the United States Army announced that it was studying the feasibility of using Manex's "bullet-time" technology to build a "holodeck" for training and simulation.

After the sale in late December 2000, Manex closed its Manex Interactive division, and a number of executives left the company, including Bobo.

=== Change of staff ===
In March 2001 and under new ownership, it was reported that "financial woes" at Manex had prompted Warner Bros. to award the $30 million contract for the second Matrix film to ESC Entertainment. ESC Entertainment was a new company which had been founded by Manex effects employees who had worked on the first Matrix. Manex had already put in "extensive" pre-production work on the two sequels, and it was reported that the company was pursuing legal options to be involved in the project in some way. Manex were, however, credited on The Matrix Reloaded and The Matrix Revolutions for their work leading to the effects.

By March 2001, Manex was still working on the Warner Bros. films 13 Ghosts and Queen of the Damned, and Warners was shooting part of both Matrix sequels at Alameda Naval Station, operated by Manex. It had also recently created visuals for Crouching Tiger, Hidden Dragon and worked on American Beauty.

Manex subsequently moved to Trenton, New Jersey and in early 2002 became involved in a project to build movie production facilities in the city. The company intended to convert a 7-acre property into a film production and equipment rental facility for $35 million, with plans to employ several hundred people. Manex fell behind on payments to the county, and in 2006, a judge ruled that Manex had lost the rights to use the property, with Manex then losing an appeal in 2008. Subsequently, to management and key staff leaving in 2001, there has been little or no creative output from Manex.

== Film credits ==
- Judge Dredd (1995)
- Eraser (1996)
- What Dreams May Come (1998)
- The Matrix (1999) (visual effects)
- Deep Blue Sea (1999) (visual effects)
- Romeo Must Die (2000) (visual effects)
- Almost Famous (2000) (special visual effects)
- Wo Hu Zang Long (special visual effects)
- Michael Jordan to the Max (2000) (visual effects)
- Mission: Impossible 2 (2000) (visual effects)
- Bless the Child (2003) (visual effects) (Lead animator: Michael "Ffish" Hemschoot)
- The Animal (2001) (visual effects)
- Exit Wounds (2001) (2nd unit visual effects)
- The Man Who Wasn't There (2001) (special visual effects)
- Thir13en Ghosts (2001)
- Queen of the Damned (2002) (visual effects)
- The Matrix Reloaded (2003) (recognized)
- The Matrix Revolutions (2003) (recognized)
