= C2 Pictures =

Defunct US film and television studio

- Type: Private
- Industry: Entertainment
- Predecessor: Carolco Pictures; Cinergi Pictures
- Founded: 1998; 28 years ago
- Founder: Mario Kassar; Andrew G. Vajna
- Defunct: 2008; 18 years ago
- Fate: Dissolved
- Successor: The Halcyon Company
- Headquarters: Santa Monica, California, United States
- Products: Motion pictures, television series and video games

C2 Pictures was an American independent media-entertainment company that specialized in film and television production. It was founded in 1998 and dissolved in 2008.

== History ==
The company was established in 1998 by Carolco Pictures co-founders Andrew G. Vajna (who had formed Cinergi Pictures until it folded in this same year) and Mario Kassar. In 1999, VCL Communications and Toho-Towa were attached as partners on the then-upcoming feature film Terminator 3: Rise of the Machines. The company assigned Metro-Goldwyn-Mayer the right to co-produce Basic Instinct 2. Both sequels were co-produced by international backer Intermedia.

The company's first production was the action comedy film I Spy (2002). Though this film was the company's first, Kassar and Vajna's initial purpose for forming the new company was to resurrect the Terminator franchise. In 2008, the company fell into dormancy and eventually was dissolved.

== Filmography ==
Release date	Title	Director(s)	Production partner(s)	Distributor(s)	Budget	Box office
November 1, 2002	I Spy	Betty Thomas	Columbia Pictures, Tall Trees Productions, Sheldon Leonard Productions	Sony Pictures Releasing	$70 million	$60.3 million
July 2, 2003	Terminator 3: Rise of the Machines	Jonathan Mostow	Columbia Pictures, Intermedia Films	Warner Bros. Pictures (United States/Canada), Sony Pictures Releasing (International)	$187.3 million ($167.3 million excluding production overhead)	$433.3 million
March 31, 2006	Basic Instinct 2	Michael Caton-Jones	Metro-Goldwyn-Mayer, Intermedia Films	Sony Pictures Releasing	$70 million	$38.6 million
November 10, 2006	Children of Glory	Krisztina Goda	N/A	Bunyik Entertainment (United States)	N/A	N/A

== Television series ==
Year(s)	Title	Creator(s)	Production partner(s)	Distributor(s)	Original network	Other notes
2008	Terminator: The Sarah Connor Chronicles	Josh Friedman	co-production with Sarah Connor Pictures, Bartleby Company and Warner Bros. Television	Warner Bros. Television Distribution	Fox	first season only
