= Superstition (1982 film) =

1982 slasher film by James W. Roberson

- Theatrical release poster
- Directed by: James W. Roberson
- Screenplay by: Donald G. Thompson
- Story by: Michael O. Sajbel; Bret Thompson Plate; Brad White
- Produced by: Ed Carlin
- Starring: James Houghton; Albert Salmi; Lynn Carlin
- Cinematography: Leon Blank
- Edited by: Al Rabinowitz
- Music by: David Gibney
- Production companies: Carolco Pictures; Penaria Corporation
- Distributed by: Almi Pictures
- Release dates: August 26, 1982 (Philippines); January 25, 1985 (New York City)
- Running time: 85 minutes
- Country: United States

Superstition is a 1982 American supernatural slasher film directed by James W. Roberson and starring James Houghton, Albert Salmi, Lynn Carlin, and Larry Pennell. The film follows a family who move into a house plagued with a history of violent unsolved murders, which was built on the site of a witch's execution in the 17th century.

An independent production headed by Carolco Pictures, Superstition was filmed on location at the historic Garbutt House in Silver Lake, Los Angeles in 1981.

Released internationally in 1982, Superstition performed well at the foreign box office, but did not receive a theatrical release in the United States until 1985. In the United Kingdom, the film was scrutinized by censors during the "video nasty" panic, though its home video release there was so successful that it was reissued for theatrical release in its uncut form under the alternative title The Witch in 1985.

== Plot ==
Two young men are brutally murdered by an unseen force in an abandoned house after playing a prank on a young couple outside in their car. A short time later, Inspector Sturgess and his partner Hollister visit Reverend David Thompson, a new clergyman assigned to the local parish who is assuming the role of an elderly minister, Reverend Maier. The abandoned house being on church's property, Sturgess voices concern about the house being a local dumping ground, and cites the recent murders of the two teenage boys, which he believes are occult-driven, as well as the drownings that have occurred in the pond next to the home.

David, Maier, Sturgess and Hollister visit the property. They meet Arlen, the mute caretaker, who appears to be mentally ill. Elvira, Arlen's aging mother, resides in an adjacent bungalow. Sturgess suspects Arlen of the recent murders. While standing on the pond's dock after chasing Arlen, Hollister is dragged into the water by an unseen assailant. Enraged after hearing of David's plans to have the pond drained, Arlen eludes the police and disappears. Sturgess and Maier interview Elvira, but she tells them only that Arlen is obeying some mysterious "mistress."

In the house, David meets Mary, a friendly young girl who claims to have once lived there. Maier blesses the building, but is killed by the blade from a table saw in a freak accident. Shortly after, the alcoholic Reverend George, his wife Melinda, and their adolescent children Ann, Sheryl, and Justin move into the house as guests of the church. On their move-in date, a renovator is killed by a clawed figure who hangs him to death in an elevator shaft inside the home. While the children go swimming in the pond, Ann discovers a severed human hand, later determined to be that of Hollister. The event results in Ann having a psychological breakdown.

In the house's basement, Justin is attacked and murdered by the claw-handed figure. Sturgess and other police mount a search for Justin in and around the house. Meanwhile, Ann has nightmares of her family being slaughtered. David unearths an antique crucifix from the pond, which Elvira claims has kept a witch, executed on the property centuries ago, dormant during daylight hours. David subsequently unearths a book in the church archives documenting a local inquisition that occurred in 1692, during which Elondra Sharack, a woman accused of murdering a nine-year-old girl named Mary, was executed in the pond by drowning. At the moment of her death, the church erupted in flames.

While searching the house, Sturgess discovers Arlen hiding in a secret room in the basement, and also uncover the body of the renovator. Arlen is arrested, while Sturgess remains at the house to further investigate. In the secret room, he is killed by the witch. Melinda attempts to venture downstairs, but discovers Justin's body hanging in the doorway. She is then attacked by the witch, who corner her into the kitchen where she beats her brutally. Upstairs, Ann and Sheryl are startled by the commotion. George attempts to intervene, and David subsequently arrives at the house, bearing the crucifix. George barricades himself in his bedroom, and discovers Melinda's bloodied body in their bed. The witch appears in the window and causes a mirror in the room to explode, the shards of it slashing George to death.

David attempts to save Ann and Sheryl, but Sheryl flees into the attic to hide, where the witch kills her by driving a stake through her head. David instructs Ann to go outside and wait in his van. He is attacked by the witch moments later, but she vanishes when he shows her the crucifix. David exits the house, and finds Ann's dead body inside his van. Despondent, he takes cans of gasoline to the pond, pours them in it, and lights it on fire. Mary appears to him and reveals herself as another form of the witch; David drives the crucifix through her heart and she falls backwards into the pond, the flames destroying her body. The disturbance seems over, but before David can leave, Elondra's hand erupts from the pond and drags him under water, drowning him.

== Cast ==
- James Houghton as Reverend David Thompson
- Albert Salmi as Inspector Sturgess
- Lynn Carlin as Melinda Leahy
- Larry Pennell as George Leahy
- Jacquelyn Hyde as Elvira Sharack
- Robert Symonds as Pike
- Heidi Bohay as Ann Leahy
- Maylo McCaslin as Sheryl Leahy
- Carole Goldman as Elondra
- Stacy Keach Sr. as Reverend Maier
- Kim Marie as Mary
- Billy Jayne as Justin Leahy
- Johnny Doran as Charlie
- Bennett Liss as Arty
- Joshua Cadman as Arlen

== Production ==
=== Development ===
Producers Michael Sajbel, Brad White, and Bret Plate initially shopped Superstition at the Milan Film Festival, shooting a ten-minute teaser trailer to pitch the project to potential investors with the preliminary title The Witch. The American independent production company Carolco Pictures, led by Andrew G. Vajna and Mario Kassar, subsequently signed on to produce the film, securing its entire shooting budget through European presales.

=== Filming ===
Superstition was filmed in 1981 in Silver Lake, Los Angeles at the historic Garbutt House, a mansion built of concrete in 1926 on a promontory once known as Dunnigan Hill. The home's original owner, Frank Garbutt, had built the residence to withstand flooding and fires, giving its interiors a bunker-like appearance. At the time of shooting, the house had been abandoned for several years and had fallen into disrepair.

== Release ==
=== Theatrical run ===
Superstition was released theatrically in Italy in 1982 and in the Philippines on August 26, 1982. The film was popular in international markets, and screened continuously in Mexico City for two years.

Superstition received a theatrical release in the United States in early 1985 without a rating. Frank Moreno, the president of Almi Pictures, promoted the film similarly to how he promoted the Almi Pictures release of The House by the Cemetery in U.S. markets. This included giving the film a trailer with what he described as "a sense of humor" and having "Brother Theodore do the voice over in order to attract a secondary audience.

Following a home video release in the United Kingdom, the British-based Bordeaux Releasing gave the film a theatrical release under the title The Witch, opening it in Chester on April 19, 1985. It opened in Brighton and London on June 14, 1985, screening as a double feature with The Entity. This version was uncut and subsequently released on video with a BBFC '18' certificate in 1987. The original title was reinstated for the 2005 UK re-release, which was also uncut.

=== Home media ===
Superstition was initially released straight to video in the United Kingdom in 1983 by VTC, and was peripherally drawn into the moral panic surrounding so-called "video nasties." Though never considered a title that could be potentially prosecuted for obscenity, it was included on the 'Section 3' list, alongside such titles as Scanners and The Thing, as a title which could be subject to seizure and subject to forfeiture of stock by retailers. Lightning Video released the film on VHS in the United States in 1985.

Anchor Bay Entertainment released the film on DVD in North America in 2006. On April 16, 2019, Scream Factory released the film for the first time on Blu-ray.

The Australian-based Imprint Films released a limited edition Blu-ray on October 30, 2024.

== Reception ==
In a review published by the New York Daily News, Superstition was negatively compared to The Amityville Horror (1979), and it was noted: "Like many contemporary fright films, Superstition substitutes escalating gore for suspense. It's also a victim of the bloated running time required to justify its single feature. Had [it] been cut as effectively as its characters, sliced to say, 70 minutes... it might have attained, despite its weak script, the lofty level of watchable." Lou Cedrone of The Baltimore Sun panned the film, writing: "There isn't much mystery to Superstition... There is much pain, boredom and violence—but mysterious it, is not." Cedrone also criticized the film for its featuring the murder of a thirteen-year-old boy. The Boston Globe's Jay Carr deemed it a "how-much-can-you-take? splatflick," adding that director Roberson "invests its low-grade guignol with more urgency than it deserves and I hope he gets a shot at something better."

The Hackensack Record's Lou Lumenick similarly criticized the film's violent content, describing it as a "schlocky slasher film... incorporating elements of Poltergeist, represented by an orgy of modestly spooky special effects in the final reel." Edward Jones, writing for The Free Lance-Star, derided the film, noting: "If you're aching for a cross between the devilish possession of The Exorcist and the bloody mayhem of Friday the 13th, sit tight and hope Hollywood can come up with something less hokey." Eleanor Ringel of The Atlanta Journal panned the film, describing it as "imbecilic" and declaring that it was "a bloody shame it was made." The Telegram & Gazette's Richard Duckett gave the film a one-star rating out of four, deeming it derivative and unoriginal.

Critic Joe Bob Briggs alternately praised the film for its gore effects, awarding it three out of four stars.

In the United Kingdom, The Northern Echo critic Peter Mortimer panned the film, writing: "James Roberson directs this stale piece of toast. It consists mainly of silly people wandering round dark corridors and down cellar steps, endlessly shouting "George?", "Arty?" or "Barbara?", before they're done in. Everyone is done in. The hero, little kids, skimpily-clad teenagers. I don't know who did it. I don't know why they did it. I don't care." Andrew Grimes of the Manchester Evening News deemed the film an "offshoot of The Amityville Horror school of shockers... But it is more akin to the Friday the 13th school in its execution—if you'll pardon the word—with a high body count and virtually all the cast being eliminated in various gruesome ways."

AllMovie described the film as a "Flamboyant, giallo-style gore effects are the only highlight of this otherwise pedestrian supernatural horror film."
