= Cinergi Pictures =

Film production company

Cinergi Pictures Entertainment Inc. Cinergi Productions N.V. Inc.
- Type: Public
- Traded as: Nasdaq: CINE
- Industry: Film studio
- Predecessor: Carolco International Pictures
- Founded: November 1989; 37 years ago
- Founder: Andrew G. Vajna
- Defunct: February 27, 1998; 28 years ago
- Fate: Ceased operations, film library now owned by Disney
- Successors: Studio: C2 Pictures; Library: Walt Disney Studios; Metro-Goldwyn-Mayer (through Orion Pictures) (Sovereign Pictures library only)
- Headquarters: Santa Monica, California, United States
- Key people: Andrew G. Vajna
- Subsidiaries: Cinergi F/X (1995–1997)

Cinergi Pictures Entertainment Inc. was an American independent film production company founded by Andrew G. Vajna in November 1989, after he had sold his interest in his first production company, Carolco International Pictures. The company had a number of major hit films, most notably Tombstone, Die Hard with a Vengeance and Evita. However, the majority of their films lost money. A string of box office bombs – including Super Mario Bros., Renaissance Man, Color of Night, Judge Dredd and Burn Hollywood Burn – ultimately did the company in, and it ceased operations on February 27, 1998. Cinergi Pictures' library is now owned by Disney.

== History ==
=== Background ===
Andrew G. Vajna, a Hungarian native, launched his career in the entertainment industry with his purchase of motion picture theaters in the Far East. Later, he founded Panasia Films Limited in Hong Kong before forming Carolco with Mario Kassar in 1976. In less than four years, Carolco became one of the top three foreign sales organizations in motion pictures.

In 1982, Vajna and Kassar made their film production debut with the highly successful First Blood, starring Sylvester Stallone. Rambo: First Blood Part II was released in 1985, generating more than $300 million worldwide, making it one of the most profitable films in the history of filmmaking.

Vajna and Kassar were executive producers on such films as Alan Parker's Angel Heart, Rambo III, and Johnny Handsome. Other projects included Music Box, Total Recall, Air America, Mountains of the Moon, Narrow Margin and Jacob's Ladder.

=== Studio formation and early years ===
Cinergi Pictures Entertainment was founded in 1989 after leaving Carolco. Vajna's strategy was to develop long-term relationships with certain talent and to produce a steady supply of two to four event motion pictures per year. Upon forming Cinergi, Vajna established an alliance with The Walt Disney Company for distribution of Cinergi motion pictures in the United States, Canada and Latin America.

In 1990, the company, along with Regency Enterprises and Constantin Film had started a venture, The Summit Group, its stake was sold off in 1994 and became Summit Entertainment.

Cinergi's first production, Medicine Man starring Oscar-winner Sean Connery, was followed by Super Mario Bros. in co-production with Allied Filmmakers and Lightmotive, Tombstone starring Val Kilmer and Kurt Russell and Renaissance Man starring Danny DeVito. In 1994, Cinergi released Color of Night starring Bruce Willis, Jane March and Lesley Ann Warren. With the exception of Tombstone, all of those films flopped at the box office.

In 1992, Cinergi was hired to manage Sovereign Pictures' library, producer of Reversal of Fortune. Cinergi went public in 1994 with Vajna converting $33.6 million in loans to equity. There was another public offering of shares in 1995.

In 1995, Cinergi released Die Hard with a Vengeance starring Bruce Willis, Jeremy Irons, and Samuel L. Jackson. To date, the film has grossed over $300 million worldwide. That film was followed by Judge Dredd starring Sylvester Stallone, The Scarlet Letter with Demi Moore, and Oliver Stone's epic Nixon, starring Anthony Hopkins. The last film released was An Alan Smithee Film: Burn Hollywood Burn.

In the early 1990s, Cinergi started up a VFX company, Mass.Illusion, in Massachusetts.

=== Decline, collapse and aftermath ===
The box office and budgets for their films began to fall in late 1996, and Cinergi Pictures eventually closed on February 27, 1998. The company's film Broadway Brawler involving Bruce Willis had abruptly stopped production in March 1997. After a year on consulting, Disney and Cinergi decided to wind down the company. Disney canceled $38 million in production advance owed and 5% of Cinergi shares in exchange for most of the film rights excluding the international rights of Die Hard with a Vengeance, which was acquired by 20th Century Fox, which ironically was bought by Disney.

The company was separately selling its development slate, a special effects facility and the Evita soundtrack. The development slate included Oliver Stone project underwritten in a first-look deal. Shareholders were expected to get between $2 and $2.50 per share back. The company's development projects sold through an auction to Vajna for $4.75 million. In September 1997, Vajna made a bid to purchase the company's stock at $2.30 a share which was considered underwhelming by Wall Street with the company expect to have $3.48 a share in cash or $45 million. The buyout would only cost him $15 million give his and his other own companies' shares in Cinergi. The Evita soundtrack and the Stone project were still not sold.

Vajna had tasked Mass.Illusion former executive producer Michael Van Himbergen and Roger Davis to sell the VFX company, which had about $1 million in debt, expert staff, likely contract for a film, The Matrix and What Dreams May Come special effects contract worth $7.5 million. Van Himbergen found Manex Group of Ohio to assume the company's debt. The company closed shortly thereafter. Its final two films, Deep Rising and An Alan Smithee Film: Burn Hollywood Burn, were released in early 1998.

Three years earlier, Kassar's Carolco Pictures had also collapsed; Vajna and Kassar eventually became partners again in 2002 to form C2 Pictures.

In 2003, Vajna bought a videogame company, Games Unlimited, and renamed Cinergi Interactive LLC. The company went on to acquire four development studios: Black Hole Entertainment, Clever's Games, Artex Entertainment and Digic Pictures before closing in 2007.

== Filmography ==
In the United States, Buena Vista Pictures through their Touchstone Pictures and Hollywood Pictures imprints distributed Cinergi's movies. Outside the United States, Cinergi operated an international sales division named Cinergi Productions N.V. Inc., which pre-sold the company's films to independent film distributors around the world.

The only film that was exempt to the deal was Die Hard with a Vengeance, which was handled by 20th Century Fox in the United States, Canada and Japan, while Cinergi Productions and Summit Entertainment handled international sales depending on the region, with Buena Vista International getting distribution rights in most regions. Following the acquisition of 21st Century Fox by Disney in 2019, the film is now collectively included in Disney's library of films.

| Release date | Title | Notes | Budget | Gross (worldwide) |
|---|---|---|---|---|
| February 7, 1992 | Medicine Man | released by Hollywood Pictures | $40 million | $45,500,797 |
| May 28, 1993 | Super Mario Bros. | released by Hollywood Pictures | $48 million | $20,915,465 |
| December 25, 1993 | Tombstone | released by Hollywood Pictures | $25 million | $56,505,065 |
| June 6, 1994 | Renaissance Man | released by Touchstone Pictures | $40 million | $24,332,324 |
| August 19, 1994 | Color of Night | released by Hollywood Pictures | $40 million | $19,726,050 |
| May 19, 1995 | Die Hard with a Vengeance | released by 20th Century Fox (North America/Japan) / Buena Vista International or Summit Entertainment (International) | $90 million | $366,101,666 |
| June 30, 1995 | Judge Dredd | released by Hollywood Pictures | $90 million | $113,493,481 |
| October 13, 1995 | The Scarlet Letter | released by Hollywood Pictures | $46 million | $10,382,407 |
| December 22, 1995 | Nixon | released by Hollywood Pictures | $44 million | $13,681,765 |
| March 1, 1996 | Up Close & Personal | released by Touchstone Pictures | $60 million | $100,688,705 |
| December 25, 1996 | Evita | released by Hollywood Pictures | $55 million | $141,047,179 |
| January 31, 1997 | Shadow Conspiracy | released by Hollywood Pictures | $45 million | $2,312,463 |
| never released | Broadway Brawler | never released | $28 million | $0 |
| January 30, 1998 | Deep Rising | released by Hollywood Pictures | $45 million | $11,203,026 |
| February 27, 1998 | An Alan Smithee Film: Burn Hollywood Burn | released by Hollywood Pictures | $10 million | $52,850 |
