= Basic Instinct 2 =

2006 film by Michael Caton-Jones

- Theatrical release poster
- Directed by: Michael Caton-Jones
- Written by: Leora Barish; Henry Bean
- Based on: Characters created by Joe Eszterhas
- Produced by: Mario Kassar; Andrew G. Vajna; Joel B. Michaels
- Starring: Sharon Stone; David Morrissey; Charlotte Rampling; David Thewlis
- Cinematography: Gyula Pados
- Edited by: John Scott; István Király
- Music by: John Murphy (Note: Original Basic Instinct themes by Jerry Goldsmith)
- Production companies: C2 Pictures; Intermedia; Kanzaman
- Distributed by: Constantin Film Verleih (Germany); Araba Films (Spain; through United International Pictures); Entertainment Film Distributors (United Kingdom); Metro-Goldwyn-Mayer Pictures (United States; through Sony Pictures Releasing)
- Release dates: 30 March 2006 (Germany); 31 March 2006 (Spain, United Kingdom and United States)
- Running time: 114 minutes
- Countries: Germany; Spain; United Kingdom; United States
- Language: English
- Budget: $70 million
- Box office: $38.6 million

Basic Instinct 2 (also known as Basic Instinct 2: Risk Addiction) is a 2006 erotic thriller film directed by Michael Caton-Jones, produced by Mario Kassar, Joel B. Michaels, and Andrew G. Vajna, and written by Leora Barish and Henry Bean. The sequel to Basic Instinct (1992), it stars Sharon Stone, who reprises her role of the crime novelist Catherine Tramell, and David Morrissey. The film was an international co-production of German, British, American, and Spanish production companies.

The film follows novelist and suspected serial killer Catherine Tramell, who is once again in trouble with the authorities, this time in London. Now Scotland Yard (Greater London's Metropolitan Police Service) appoints psychiatrist Dr. Michael Glass to evaluate her. As with SFPD Detective Nick Curran in the first film, Dr. Glass becomes a victim of Tramell's psychological manipulation.

After being in development limbo for several years, the sequel film was shot in London from April to August 2005, and was released on 31 March 2006. It received negative reviews and underperformed at the box office.

== Plot ==
In London, American best-selling author Catherine Tramell is driving with her companion, famous English football star Kevin Franks. Tramell takes Franks's hand and begins masturbating herself with it as she accelerates the car, but the semi-unconscious Franks appears unaware of what is happening. At the point of orgasm, Tramell veers off the road and crashes into the West India Docks on the Thames. She attempts to save Franks but is unable to undo the seatbelt. When questioned later by the police, she says, "When it came down to it, I guess my life was more important to me than his".

Tramell's interrogator, Scotland Yard Detective Superintendent Roy Washburn, notes that D-tubocurarine (DTC), a neuromuscular blocking agent used to relax muscles during general anaesthesia for medical surgery, was found in her car and in Franks' body and the autopsy shows he was not breathing when the crash occurred. Washburn says that a drug dealer claims he sold Tramell DTC, but Tramell counters that he is lying and has no evidence.

Tramell begins therapy sessions with Dr. Michael Glass, who has conducted a court-ordered psychiatric examination and given testimony in her case. Dr. Glass suspects Tramell is a narcissist who cannot differentiate between right and wrong. Tramell begins to manipulate Glass, who becomes increasingly frustrated and intrigued by her, although he has just begun a relationship with another psychiatrist, Michelle. Meanwhile, the journalist boyfriend of Glass's ex-wife, Denise, who was writing an article criticizing one of Glass' past cases, is found strangled to death. More murders occur around Dr. Glass, including the killing of Denise and Tramell's drug dealer 'Dickie Pep'. His obsession with Tramell grows, and he is increasingly unable to distinguish between right and wrong. When the police begin to suspect Glass of the murders, Washburn, the only one who believes Glass, informs him that Tramell had an affair with Towers and Denise, gave Michael an false alibi for Denise's murder, and that she is the real killer attempting to frame him. He confronts Tramell at her apartment, where they passionately have sex. Tramell gives Glass a copy of the draft of her next novel, titled The Analyst. After reading it, he realizes that Tramell has novelised most of the recent events, with Glass and herself as characters. A character based on Glass's female colleague, Dr. Milena Gardosh, is depicted as the next murder victim in the novel.

Glass runs to Dr. Gardosh's apartment, finding Tramell already there. Gardosh betrays Michael, and informs him that she is now in charge of Tramell, and that his license will be revoked. He and Gardosh struggle, and she is knocked unconscious. Tramell then threatens Glass with a gun she carries, but Glass confiscates it from her. Roy arrives at the scene, Glass shoots him and points the gun at Tramell before police tackle him.

Later, Tramell visits Glass, now apparently insensible and institutionalised at a mental hospital. She tells him that her novel has become a best seller. Tramell suggests that Glass used her proximity to him as an excuse to murder his enemies, intending to frame her. Flashbacks or imaginings show Glass committing the murders. She says she suspects he is faking insanity; murdering Washburn so he wouldn't be fit to stand trial. She gives him a copy of the book with the inscription, "I couldn't have done it without you." Tramell kisses him and leaves, and Glass begins to smile.

== Cast ==
- Sharon Stone as Catherine Tramell
- David Morrissey as Dr. Michael Glass
- Charlotte Rampling as Dr. Milena Gardosh
- David Thewlis as Roy Washburn
- Hugh Dancy as Adam Towers
- Flora Montgomery as Michelle Broadwin
- Indira Varma as Denise Glass
- Heathcote Williams as Dr. Jakob Gerst
- Anne Caillon as Laney Ward
- Iain Robertson as Peter Ristedes
- Stan Collymore as Kevin Franks
- Kata Dobó as Magda
- Jan Chappell as Angela
- André Schneider as Policeman

== Development ==
MGM had planned to produce the sequel for release in 2002, but announced in 2001 that they would no longer be making the film. On the same day of the announcement, Stone filed a lawsuit against the movie's producers Andrew G. Vajna and Mario Kassar, claiming she was guaranteed "at least $14 million for her commitment to the sequel, even if the movie never got made" and "as much as 15 percent of gross receipts if the film were released". Paul Verhoeven, who directed the previous film, was offered to direct, but he declined. Die Hard director John McTiernan had been attached to direct the film. He said that he wanted Benjamin Bratt to play the male lead, but that Stone did not approve. He wanted to rewrite the character as a Latin-American psychiatrist working in an emergency room, who is "seduced not by just the woman but by wealth and luxury he'd never before been exposed to." Robert Downey Jr. declined the role of Dr. Michael Glass. Aaron Eckhart had also been in consideration to co-star with Stone. Other directors considered included David Cronenberg and Lee Tamahori. In 2004, the producers settled the lawsuit with Stone by agreeing to make the movie.

== Production ==
Michael Caton-Jones signed on to direct the film, later stating, "I was completely broke and had to take anything that came in. Basic Instinct 2 was this poisoned chalice that had been passed around and eventually it arrived at my door." David Morrissey was cast in the co-starring role as the psychiatrist who analyzes Catherine Tramell. He said he "loved the script" and "immediately hit it off" with Sharon Stone "and it remained that way through the filming." The film was threatened with an NC-17 rating by the MPAA and went through cuts to achieve an R rating.

== Reception ==
=== Critical response ===
On the review aggregator website Rotten Tomatoes, 6% of 153 critics' reviews are positive, with an average rating of 3.2/10. The website's consensus reads: "Unable to match the suspense and titillation of its predecessor, Basic Instinct 2 boasts a plot so ludicrous and predictable it borders on so-bad-it's-good." Metacritic, which uses a weighted average, assigned the film a score of 26 out of 100, based on 33 critics, indicating "generally unfavorable" reviews. Audiences polled by CinemaScore gave the film an average grade of "C" on an A+ to F scale.

BBC film critic Mark Kermode was one of the few critics to give it a positive review. Roger Ebert gave the film 1.5 stars out of a possible 4, calling it "godawful," but not boring. He said, "The Catherine Tramell role cannot be played well, but Sharon Stone can play it badly better than any other actress alive."

At the 27th Golden Raspberry Awards, the film (dubbed by the ceremony as "Basically, It Stinks, Too") won four Razzies for Worst Picture, Worst Actress (Sharon Stone), Worst Prequel or Sequel, and Worst Screenplay (Leora Barish and Henry Bean). It also earned nominations for Worst Director (Michael Caton-Jones), Worst Supporting Actor (David Thewlis), and Worst Screen Couple (Sharon Stone's lopsided breasts). The film also received three nominations at the 2006 Stinkers Bad Movie Awards: Worst Picture, Worst Actress (Sharon Stone), and Worst Sequel.

Michael Caton-Jones recalled later that making the movie was "a painful experience" and said, "the reaction I couldn’t care less about. It was the experience of making it: it was horrible. And I knew before I started that it wasn't going to be a particularly good film. Which is a very, very painful thing." Interviewed by Empire magazine, he said: "I remember coldly thinking 'this is the worst filmmaking experience of my life' at the time, but my memory of it is the good thing. We tried to give it a look and I was very happy with it. I had a difficult time with Sharon [Stone], but I had a great time with all the other actors."

Morrissey said: "I thought it was a great script. I know it didn't turn out to be the greatest film in the world, but I've never regretted any job I've gone into. You learn from all your work, but the knocks that you take whether it be from journalist, reviews, etc. all serve to make you stronger." Plans for a third film were scrapped due to the poor box-office reception.

=== Box office ===
The film was a noteworthy domestic failure at the box office; it grossed only $3.2 million in its first weekend of release in the United States and Canada, falling by nearly 70% (to just $700 per theatre) in its second weekend. In the end, the film was in theatres for only 17 days before Sony decided to stop tracking its progress, and finished with a domestic gross of $6.0 million. The film earned $32.7 million in international markets, for a worldwide theatrical gross of $38.6 million, against a budget of $70 million. In 2007, Moviefone ranked the film as number 16 on its Top 25 Box Office Bombs of All Time.

=== Awards and nominations ===
Award	Category	Nominee(s)	Result	Ref.
Alliance of Women Film Journalists	Hall of Shame		Won	
Golden Raspberry Awards	Worst Picture		Won	
Golden Raspberry Awards	Worst Director	Michael Caton-Jones	Nominated	
Golden Raspberry Awards	Worst Actress	Sharon Stone	Won	
Golden Raspberry Awards	Worst Supporting Actor	David Thewlis (also for The Omen)	Nominated	
Golden Raspberry Awards	Worst Screenplay	Leora Barish and Henry Bean; Based on characters created by Joe Eszterhas	Won	
Golden Raspberry Awards	Worst Screen Couple	Sharon Stone's lopsided breasts	Nominated	
Golden Raspberry Awards	Worst Prequel or Sequel		Won	
Oklahoma Film Critics Circle Awards	Obviously Worst Film		Won	
Stinkers Bad Movie Awards	Worst Picture		Nominated	
Stinkers Bad Movie Awards	Worst Actress	Sharon Stone	Nominated	
Stinkers Bad Movie Awards	Worst Sequel		Nominated	
Women Film Critics Circle Awards	Hall of Shame		Won	
Yoga Awards	Worst Foreign Actress	Sharon Stone	Won	
