= Renaissance Man (film) =

1994 film by Penny Marshall

- Theatrical release poster
- Directed by: Penny Marshall
- Written by: Jim Burnstein
- Produced by: Sara Colleton; Elliot Abbott; Penny Marshall; Robert Greenhut; Andrew G. Vajna
- Starring: Danny DeVito; Gregory Hines; James Remar; Cliff Robertson
- Cinematography: Adam Greenberg
- Edited by: George Bowers
- Music by: Hans Zimmer
- Production companies: Touchstone Pictures; Parkway Productions; Cinergi Pictures
- Distributed by: Buena Vista Pictures Distribution (North America/South America); Cinergi Productions (International, via Summit Entertainment)
- Release date: June 3, 1994
- Running time: 128 minutes
- Country: United States
- Language: English
- Budget: $40 million
- Box office: $24 million

Renaissance Man is a 1994 American comedy film directed by Penny Marshall, and starring Danny DeVito, Gregory Hines, James Remar and Cliff Robertson. It follows a former advertising executive teaching uneducated recruits at an army base. In Australia, the film is known under the title of Army Intelligence. The film received generally negative reviews. It grossed $24 million at the box office against a budget of $40 million.

== Plot ==
Bill Rago is a divorced advertising executive down on his luck. When he loses his job in Detroit, the unemployment agency finds him a temporary job: teaching basic literacy classes at a nearby U.S. Army training base, Fort McClane.

Initially unenthusiastic, Rago finds that he has only six weeks to teach a group of undereducated soldiers the basics of comprehension and use of English language. Most of the soldiers are only semi-literate and equally unenthusiastic.

Unable to connect with his pupils and desperate to spark their interest, Rago quotes from his favorite play, Hamlet by William Shakespeare. They are unfamiliar with it (or even the concept of a "play") and a small initial spark of interest is generated. He casts each student as a character in a classroom reading, then takes everyone on a field trip across the Blue Water Bridge to Stratford, Ontario, Canada, to a live performance by Shakespearean actors. He introduces them to Shakespeare's Henry V as well.

In the meantime, Rago takes steps to mend bridges with his daughter Emily by buying her an airline ticket to Mexico – as well as buying her a Schmidt-Cassegrain telescope – so that she can start on the path to becoming a professional astronomer.

Despite the disapproval of their hard-as-nails Drill Sergeant Cass, and the loss of one of the trainees, Private Roosevelt Hobbs, who is revealed as a drug dealer hiding under an assumed identity, Rago sets an end-of-term oral examination. Even the friendly Captain Tom Murdoch, who is in charge of the project, doesn't expect the soldiers to pass Rago's class, adding that if they fail they will be discharged from the Army.

Hobbs writes a letter to Rago and Murdoch, whose letters to the prison warden may result in him getting an early parole. Hobbs says he read Othello in the prison library (the librarian said he was the first inmate in 16 years to request Shakespeare) and was thinking about taking college classes once he's released.

While on duty, on a dare from Cass in front of other men, Pvt. Donnie Benitez recites the St. Crispin's Day Speech by King Henry V while in full combat gear in the middle of a rainstorm during a night exercise; the speech moves even the hardened Sergeant Cass. The students then all pass Rago's class with flying colors.

Rago meets and dates Staff Sergeant Marie Leighton, a soldier in the records department who helps him do some investigation before the base's graduation ceremony. It results in Private Brian Davis Jr. being presented with the Silver Star medal his father was to have been awarded posthumously, after he was killed in Vietnam.

As the proud soldiers march at their graduation parade, Rago is saluted by his "graduates". He signs on to continue teaching soldiers-in-training.

== Cast ==
- Danny DeVito as Bill Rago
- Gregory Hines as Sergeant First Class Cass
- James Remar as Captain Tom Murdoch
- Cliff Robertson as Colonel James
- Ed Begley Jr. as Jack Markin
- Lillo Brancato, Jr. as Private Donnie Benitez
- Stacey Dash as Private Miranda Myers
- Kadeem Hardison as Private Jamaal Montgomery
- Richard T. Jones as Corporal Jackson Leroy
- Samaria Graham as Shana Leroy
- Khalil Kain as Private Roosevelt (Nathaniel) Hobbs
- Peter Simmons as Private Brian Davis, Jr.
- Greg Sporleder as Private Melvin Melvin
- Mark Wahlberg as Private Tommy Lee Haywood
- Ben Wright as Private Oswald
- Ann Cusack as Secretary
- Jeb Brown as Noah Bradley
- Jenifer Lewis as Beverly Coleman
- Alanna Ubach as Emily Rago
- Matt Keeslar as MP
- Isabella Hofmann as Staff Sergeant Marie Leighton
- Geoff Ramsey as Soldier

== Production ==
The script was written by Jim Burnstein. Director Penny Marshall requested rewrites to make the script funnier, not merely by adding more jokes but by "deepening the characters and finding all the humor and heart in them." Burnstein was on call during filming to answer questions about the script, particularly when it came to lines relating to Hamlet. He visited the set, spending time at each location. Marshall allowed him to watch some of the dailies but as it was his first film he did not offer his opinions, and he also knew that editors would be "the last writer" and make their own changes to the film. Burnstein and his family appeared as extras at the baseball game. Danny DeVito was cast in April 1993.

Filming began on July 2, 1993, and ended on November 26, 1993. The scenes at the fictional "Fort McClane" were actually filmed at Fort Jackson, South Carolina. The production trailers were set up alongside the barracks on "Tank Hill". During the filming, soldiers were filmed doing P.T. (physical training) and B.R.M. (basic rifle marksmanship), and the graduation scene of the film was shot during an actual basic training graduation. In one of these scenes Geoff Ramsey can be seen doing jumping jacks. The scene of Danny DeVito on a pay phone was shot at a phone bank that countless soldiers have used to call home during basic training. The scenes of DeVito going over the bridge from Detroit to Canada are actually him driving over the Blue Water Bridge in Point Edward, Ontario and Port Huron, Michigan.

It had a production budget of $40 million.

== Reception ==
Renaissance Man received mainly negative reviews. Roger Ebert gave the film one and a half stars out of a possible four. Ebert said that "the touch that was used so well in director Penny Marshall's previous films Big and A League of Their Own is totally missing in Renaissance Man and it feels like a cross between Dead Poets Society and Private Benjamin but does not have the warmth or spirit of those films." He also wondered what DeVito's character teaching William Shakespeare's plays had to do with the training of the military recruits. Ebert gave it a thumbs-down on his television show, but partner Gene Siskel enjoyed it as pleasant fare and gave it a thumbs-up. Kim Newman of Empire magazine called it "a feel good movie which is too mechanically put together to make you feel anything." Janet Maslin of The New York Times praised the likable cast but called it "Inherently condescending, and finally awash in warm-bath sentimentality, this setup never goes out of style."

On Rotten Tomatoes it holds a 12% rating based on 25 reviews. The site's consensus states: "Renaissance Man tries to simultaneously be a literary comedy, an inspirational drama, and a star vehicle that caters to Danny DeVito's strengths, but proves to be a master of none." On Metacritic, the film has a score of 44 out of 100 based on 20 reviews, indicating "mixed or average reviews". Audiences surveyed by CinemaScore gave the film a grade "A−" on scale of A to F.

The film flopped at the U.S box office, grossing only US$24 million in the United States and Canada in 12 weeks. It was hindered by competing with summer blockbusters such as Speed, True Lies, The Flintstones, and The Lion King.

== Year-end lists ==
- Dishonorable mention – Glenn Lovell, San Jose Mercury News

== Reissue ==
The film was reissued on September 16, 1994 on 17 screens in the Seattle area under the title By the Book but did not fare any better.
