= An Alan Smithee Film: Burn Hollywood Burn =

1997 American mockumentary film

- Theatrical release poster
- Directed by: Arthur Hiller (Note: Credited as Alan Smithee.)
- Written by: Joe Eszterhas
- Produced by: Ben Myron
- Starring: Ryan O'Neal; Coolio; Chuck D; Richard Jeni; Eric Idle; Sylvester Stallone; Whoopi Goldberg; Jackie Chan
- Cinematography: Reynaldo Villalobos
- Edited by: L. James Langlois
- Music by: Chuck D; Joel Diamond; Gary G-Wiz
- Production companies: Hollywood Pictures; Cinergi Pictures
- Distributed by: Buena Vista Pictures Distribution (Americas); Cinergi Productions (International)
- Release dates: October 1997 (Mill Valley); February 27, 1998 (United States)
- Running time: 86 minutes
- Country: United States
- Language: English
- Budget: $10 million
- Box office: $59,921

An Alan Smithee Film: Burn Hollywood Burn (stylized on-screen as Burn Hollywood Burn) is a 1997 American mockumentary black comedy film directed by Arthur Hiller, written by Joe Eszterhas and starring Eric Idle as a director unfortunately named Alan Smithee, a traditional pseudonym used in Hollywood for directors disowning a project. The film follows Smithee as he steals the negatives to his latest film and goes on the run.

An Alan Smithee Film: Burn Hollywood Burn was universally panned by critics and tanked at the box office. It won five awards (including Worst Picture) at the 19th Golden Raspberry Awards.

The film's creation set off a chain of events which led the Directors Guild of America to officially discontinue the Alan Smithee credit in 2000 after its use for decades when an American director disavowed a film.

The plot, about a director attempting to disown a film, described the film's own production; Hiller requested that his name be removed after witnessing the final cut, and he is credited as Alan Smithee.

An Alan Smithee Film: Burn Hollywood Burn was also the final film produced by Cinergi Pictures to be released before the company declared bankruptcy.

== Plot ==
Challenger Films president Jerry Glover and producer James Edmunds hire acclaimed English editor Alan Smithee to direct Trio, a blockbuster action film starring Sylvester Stallone, Whoopi Goldberg, and Jackie Chan. Though only hired due to his inexperience, which the producers believe will make him controllable, Smithee becomes invested in the project.

Edmunds makes frequent changes to the film, hiring many additional writers to retool the script and giving Smithee frequent notes during production. Between this and frequent interference from the film's stars, Smithee becomes withdrawn. Edmunds hires prostitute Michelle Rafferty to seduce a drunken Smithee, who is in an unhappy marriage, so he can acquire blackmail material. Michelle is captivated by Smithee's kind spirit, and develops feelings for him.

Smithee realizes he has lost control over Trio, and voices his concerns to Edmunds, who advises him to take his name off the film and use the DGA pseudonym - which he cannot do, as it is also 'Alan Smithee.' After Stallone requests they cut one of Chan's lines in the film, Smithee offers to make the edit and drop the master off at the lab for duplication, instead stealing it and running away.

As Challenger instructs security foreman Sam Rizzo to organize a search for Smithee, he calls into Larry King, and in the middle of a mental breakdown, announces his intention to burn the film so it may not be released. At a gas station, he is spotted by Stagger Lee, a member of the African American Guerilla Film Family, whom he quickly befriends. Smithee is put in touch with famed indie directors the Brothers brothers, who relate to his plight and schedule a meeting with Glover and Edmunds to negotiate.

Glover offers the brothers a three-picture deal if they return the master as-is, but they refuse, insisting that Smithee be given final cut on Trio. Though claiming to accept this offer, Glover has Rizzo follow the brothers back to their house, where the police search for the master. Smithee exits through a back window and drives to the La Brea Tar Pits, where he finally burns the film as promised. He appears on Larry King again, in-person, to defend his actions, explaining that "they killed [Trio], I ended its suffering."

Attorney Robert Shapiro negotiates for Smithee to be sent to a psychiatric hospital in England in lieu of criminal charges, as the King interview has led Smithee to be regarded as a hero by the public. Glover and Edmunds compete in a bidding war with producer Robert Evans to secure Smithee's life story for a film adaptation, which Smithee sells on the condition that the Brothers brothers direct with final cut. The producers decide that Smithee, with his newfound reputation, is now a valuable property, and offer him a film deal. At the hospital, Michelle reconciles with Smithee as he discusses plans for his new film, Duo.

== Cast ==
- Eric Idle as Alan Smithee
- Ryan O'Neal as James Edmunds
- Coolio as Dion Brothers
- Chuck D as Leon Brothers
- Richard Jeni as Jerry Glover
- Leslie Stefanson as Michelle Rafferty
- Sandra Bernhard as Ann Glover
- Cherie Lunghi as Myrna Smithee
- Harvey Weinstein as Sam Rizzo
- Gavin Polone as Gary Samuels
- MC Lyte as Sista Tu Lumumba
- Marcello Thedford as Stagger Lee
- Nicole Nagel as Aloe Vera
- Stephen Tobolowsky as Bill Bardo
- Erik King as Wayne Jackson
- Dina Spybey as Alessandra

Cameos as Themselves

- Sylvester Stallone
- Whoopi Goldberg
- Jackie Chan
- Robert Evans
- Robert Shapiro
- Shane Black
- Mario Machado
- Lisa Canning
- Joe Eszterhas
- Larry King
- Peter Bart
- Dominick Dunne
- Billy Bob Thornton
- Billy Barty
- Norman Jewison (uncredited)

== Production ==
In June 1996, it was reported that Joe Eszterhas was working on a script satirizing Hollywood tentatively titled An Alan Smithee Film, which would follow the production of a $315 million blockbuster film called Trio where the director, named Alan Smithee, is driven to criminal lengths after his growing dissatisfaction with the film. Eszterhas cited the stigma following the failure of Showgirls and Jade and his efforts to recover from the fallout as an inspiration for when he was writing Alan Smithee. Eszterhas compared the film to the mockumentary comedy This Is Spinal Tap, while distancing comparisons to The Player. In describing how he conceived the film, Eszterhas stated:

I wrote this as a complete hoot [...] I had no idea what the response was going to be, but I was having a lot of fun doing it. ... Sometimes people in this town have a tendency to take themselves way too seriously. We’ve got to lighten up and that’s what this piece is about.

Eszterhas also hoped the film would get him taken seriously as a writer; he resented his pigeonholing as a writer strictly of erotic films and hoped An Alan Smithee Film would free him of that stigma. Eszterhas recounted a phone conversation with then-Universal Studios President, Ronald Meyer, who congratulated Eszterhas on "writing from your heart, instead of your groin." Arnold Rifkin, at the time Eszterhas' agent, was instrumental in getting the film set up with Cinergi Pictures and Andrew G. Vajna for financing. Despite Rifkin's role in securing backing for the film, Eszterhas claimed Rifkin initially had no faith in the script and warned Eszterhas not to circulate the script. In November 1996, Eszterhas would fire Rifkin as he felt he was no longer getting adequate representation, in particular citing a recent incident where Rifkin stated he wouldn't be able to read a spec script Eszterhas had submitted for two-and-a-half weeks.

=== Cameos ===
Initially, the script called for Arnold Schwarzenegger, Sylvester Stallone, and Bruce Willis to play fictionalized versions of themselves starring in Trio, but only Stallone agreed to appear in the film, and the other two roles were rewritten (Schwarzenegger's role being refitted for Whoopi Goldberg). Albert and Allen Hughes were initially slated to play fictionalized versions of themselves, but these roles were also rewritten and played by Coolio and Chuck D. Eszterhas's frequent collaborator, producer Ben Myron, claimed that after the script began circulating throughout Hollywood his office was inundated with calls from industry figures to ask either if they were in the script or to complain that they weren't in the script. When Rifkin was still involved with Eszterhas and the film, he was also serving as an agent on behalf of Goldberg, Stallone, and Jackie Chan, the three stars who play fictionalized versions of themselves in the film-within-a-film Trio.

=== Post-production ===
The released film credits the Alan Smithee pseudonym as director because Arthur Hiller, the film's real director, objected to the way Eszterhas recut the film, and as a result, had his name removed. In his autobiography, Hollywood Animal, Eszterhas claims that Hiller still sat in the editing room with him to make certain suggestions.

In May 1997, it was reported that Hiller would be taking his name off the film due to dissatisfaction with the final product. Eszterhas had made significant edits to the film in post-production, removing 19 minutes of footage and modifying the soundtrack to utilize selections which allegedly scored higher with audiences at two test screenings Eszterhas held without consulting Hiller. Attempts were made by Cinergi's CEO to ease tensions between Hiller and Eszterhas, but Hiller ultimately took his name off the film and replaced it with the Alan Smithee credit. When questioned about the nature of the feud, Eszterhas stated:

[Hiller] should offer to kiss my ass in Times Square for saving this film.

In his entry on An Alan Smithee Film: Burn Hollywood Burn for his "My Year of Flops" column in The A.V. Club, pop culture critic Nathan Rabin sarcastically commented that Hiller's decision to use the Alan Smithee credit was "very transparently not a stupid, stupid gimmick to raise interest in a terrible film".

== Release ==
=== Theatrical ===
An Alan Smithee Film: Burn Hollywood Burn had its premiere on the opening night of the Mill Valley Film Festival on October 2, 1997. The film was released theatrically on February 27, 1998 before a home video release on August 18, 1998.

== Reception ==
=== Box office ===
The film had an estimated budget of $10 million and grossed at least $59,921, as it was released in only 19 theaters.

=== Critical response ===
The film was critically abhored upon release. On the review aggregator website Rotten Tomatoes, 8% of 38 critics' reviews are positive, with an average rating of 3.3/10. The website's consensus reads: "A witless Hollywood satire whose hammy, obvious jokes are neither funny nor insightful of the movie business."

Film critic Roger Ebert, reviewing for the Chicago Sun-Times, gave An Alan Smithee Film: Burn Hollywood Burn a score of zero stars, his lowest possible rating. The film was not merely bad but "incompetent", Ebert wrote, and also seemingly represented a lapse of judgment for Eszterhas who "is sometimes a good writer". In 2005, Ebert included it on his list of most hated films.

Eszterhas became the first person to win four Golden Raspberry awards for a single film: Worst Picture, Worst Screenplay and both Worst Supporting Actor and Worst New Star for a brief cameo appearance (he also received a co-nomination for the Worst Screen Couple award, since An Alan Smithee Film: Burn Hollywood Burn was nominated for "any two people appearing together onscreen"; although the movie did not "win" in this category).

Eric Idle said in various interviews meant to promote the film that "this is rather dreadful".

=== Accolades ===
Date of Ceremony	Award	Category	Recipients	Result	Ref.
1999	Stinkers Bad Movie Awards	Worst Picture	An Alan Smithee Film: Burn Hollywood Burn (Hollywood Pictures)	Nominated	
1999	Stinkers Bad Movie Awards	Worst Director	Arthur Hiller	Nominated	
1999	Stinkers Bad Movie Awards	Most Painfully Unfunny Comedy	An Alan Smithee Film: Burn Hollywood Burn (Hollywood Pictures)	Nominated	
1999	Stinkers Bad Movie Awards	Worst On-Screen Hairstyle	Joe Eszterhas	Won	
March 20, 1999	Golden Raspberry Awards	Worst Picture	An Alan Smithee Film: Burn Hollywood Burn (Hollywood Pictures)	Won	
March 20, 1999	Golden Raspberry Awards	Worst Actor	Ryan O'Neal	Nominated	
March 20, 1999	Golden Raspberry Awards	Worst Supporting Actor	Joe Eszterhas	Won	
March 20, 1999	Golden Raspberry Awards	Worst Supporting Actor	Sylvester Stallone	Nominated	
March 20, 1999	Golden Raspberry Awards	Worst Screen Couple	Any combination of two people playing themselves (or playing with themselves)	Nominated	
March 20, 1999	Golden Raspberry Awards	Worst Director	Arthur Hiller (as Alan Smithee)	Nominated	
March 20, 1999	Golden Raspberry Awards	Worst Screenplay	Joe Eszterhas	Won	
March 20, 1999	Golden Raspberry Awards	Worst New Star	Joe Eszterhas	Won	
March 20, 1999	Golden Raspberry Awards	Worst Original Song	"I Wanna Be Mike Ovitz!", written by Joe Eszterhas and Gary G-Wiz	Won	
March 25, 2000	Golden Raspberry Awards	Worst Picture of the Decade	An Alan Smithee Film: Burn Hollywood Burn (Hollywood Pictures)	Nominated	

== Notes ==
Awards
Preceded by The Postman	Razzie Award for Worst Picture; 19th Golden Raspberry Awards	Succeeded by Wild Wild West
