= Judge Dredd (film) =

1995 film by Danny Cannon

- Theatrical release poster
- Directed by: Danny Cannon
- Screenplay by: William Wisher Jr.; Steven E. de Souza
- Story by: Michael De Luca; William Wisher, Jr.
- Based on: Judge Dredd by; John Wagner; Carlos Ezquerra; ABC Warriors by; Pat Mills; Kevin O'Neill
- Produced by: Charles Lippincott; Beau E. L. Marks
- Starring: Sylvester Stallone; Armand Assante; Diane Lane; Rob Schneider; Joan Chen; Jürgen Prochnow; Max von Sydow
- Cinematography: Adrian Biddle
- Edited by: Alex Mackie; Harry Keramidas; Jeremy Gibbs
- Music by: Alan Silvestri
- Production companies: Hollywood Pictures; Cinergi Pictures; Edward R. Pressman Film Corporation
- Distributed by: Buena Vista Pictures Distribution; (North America/South America); Cinergi Productions; (International, via Summit Entertainment)
- Release date: June 30, 1995 (U.S.)
- Running time: 96 minutes
- Country: United States
- Language: English
- Budget: $85–90 million
- Box office: $113.5 million

Judge Dredd is a 1995 American science fiction action film based on the 2000 AD comics Judge Dredd. It is directed by Danny Cannon and stars Sylvester Stallone as Judge Dredd, a law enforcement officer in the crime-ridden futuristic metropolis of Mega-City One. Armand Assante, Diane Lane, Rob Schneider, Joan Chen, Jürgen Prochnow, and Max von Sydow appear in supporting roles. It was filmed entirely at Shepperton Studios in the United Kingdom, and released by Buena Vista Pictures on June 30, 1995.

The film is set in the 22nd century and depicts a dystopian world. Following an unspecified disaster that turned Earth into a "cursed" wasteland, the survivors established a corps of Judges whose role combines that of police, judge, jury and executioner. In Judge Dredd, Dredd, one of the most dedicated Street Judges, has been framed for murder by his own half-brother — the psychotic Rico, who plots to take over Mega-City One with an army of superhuman clones. The film was produced by Charles Lippincott and Beau E. L. Marks, with a screenplay by William Wisher Jr. and Steven E. de Souza.

Judge Dredd went into general release on June 30, 1995. It grossed $113.5 million worldwide against a production budget of $85-90 million, and was considered a box-office disappointment at the time. It received negative reviews from critics, and is often considered to be one of Stallone's worst films, but its visual style, effects, music score, stunts and action sequences were praised, and the film was nominated for four Saturn Awards.

== Plot ==
In the future, the Earth has become a deadly wasteland called the Cursed Earth. The few survivors live in overcrowded "Mega-Cities" plagued by rampant crime. To combat this, a new order of law enforcement has emerged: Judges, officers who act as police, jury, and executioner.

In 2139, in Mega-City One, a crime epidemic threatens to overwhelm the Judges' dwindling resources. The strict and feared Judge Dredd assists rookie Judge Hershey in violently quelling a block war. In the same raid, Dredd apprehends Fergie, a hacker and recent parolee, hiding in a city-owned robot. Dredd sentences him to five more years for property destruction. Hershey criticizes Dredd's unyielding approach to the law and his solitary nature. Dredd, in response, reveals that nine years earlier he judged and ordered the execution of his best friend and fellow Judge, Rico, for committing a massacre.

Meanwhile, Rico, secretly imprisoned at the Aspen Penal Colony, receives a covert message. He escapes and returns to Mega-City One. He retrieves his Judge uniform and Lawgiver gun, and reactivates a decommissioned ABC Warrior, a combat robot, to serve him. Disguised as Dredd, Rico shoots and kills reporter Vartis Hammond, a critic of Dredd and the Judges' violent law enforcement.

Evidence incriminates Dredd, who is put on trial before the Council of Judges, including his mentor Chief Justice Fargo and Judge Griffin. Despite Hershey's defense, Dredd is convicted when DNA from the bullets found in the scene matches his own. Fargo retires to spare Dredd's life, requesting leniency as his last act. Dredd is sentenced to life imprisonment while Fargo embarks on the "Long Walk", the final task of a retired Judge to enforce the law in the Cursed Earth until their death.

On the transport to the penal colony, Dredd is coincidentally seated next to Fergie. Their transport is shot down by the Angel Gang, a group of cannibalistic scavengers. Fargo intervenes to help Dredd escape the gang, and the Judges sent after him by Griffin, but is mortally wounded. Before dying, Fargo reveals that Dredd and Rico are clones created by the Janus Project, a genetic engineering program designed to produce perfect Judges using DNA formed from the best traits of the Council, including Fargo. However, following Rico's turn to criminality, the project was abandoned and its existence concealed. Fargo warns Dredd that Griffin conspired to conceal Rico's survival, frame Dredd, and force Fargo's retirement to reactivate the Janus Project, and urges Dredd to stop him.

In Mega-City One, Rico terrorizes the city, killing Judges to weaken their forces. Griffin uses the chaos to convince the Council to unlock Janus and clone a new Judge army to ruthlessly enforce the law. When the Council tries to reverse its decision, Griffin has Rico eliminate them. At the Janus lab in the Statue of Liberty, Rico replaces the original DNA sample with his own to cultivate clones with free will as his "family", refusing to let them be controlled as he was. When Griffin protests, Rico has the ABC Warrior kill him.

Dredd and Fergie return to the city and team up with Hershey, who has uncovered the Janus Project. Together, they infiltrate the lab, where the ABC Warrior injures Fergie and captures Hershey. Rico confronts Dredd for betraying him, but asserts that they are family and offers Dredd the chance to lead the clones alongside him; Dredd refuses. As Fergie disables the ABC Warrior, Rico prematurely activates the clones for backup, causing the lab to explode and destroying them. Dredd pursues Rico to the top of the statue, ultimately throwing him to his death.

Back on the ground, Dredd's name is cleared after the city's supercomputer broadcasts the truth about Janus. The remaining Judges ask Dredd to become Chief Justice, but he declines, preferring to work as a street Judge.

== Cast ==
- Sylvester Stallone as Judge Joseph Dredd
- Armand Assante as Rico
- Diane Lane as Judge Hershey
- Rob Schneider as Fergie
- Jürgen Prochnow as Judge Griffin
- Max von Sydow as Chief Justice Fargo
- Joanna Miles as Judge McGruder
- Joan Chen as Dr. Ilsa Hayden
- Balthazar Getty as Cadet Nathan Olmeyer
- Ian Dury as Geiger
- Mitchell Ryan as Vartis Hammond
- Bradley Lavelle as Chief Judge Hunter
- Scott Wilson as Pa Angel
- Christopher Adamson as Mean Machine Angel
- Ewen Bremner as Junior Angel
- Phil Smeeton as Link Angel

Other actors include Maurice Roëves as Warden Miller, James Remar as the Block Warlord, Pat Starr as Lily Hammond, Lex Daniel as rookie Judge Brisco, Angus MacInnes as Judge Silver, Peter Marinker as Judge Esposito, Mark Moraghan as Judge Monroe, Louise Delamere as Judge Meeker, and Al Sapienza as Judge Gellar. Adrienne Barbeau provides the voice of the Hall of Justice Central Computer. James Earl Jones provides the narration to the film's opening text crawl.

== Production ==
=== Development ===
Prior to production, the producer Edward Pressman had the script rewritten by Walon Green, Rene Balcer, and Michael S. Chernuchin. Early in development, Renny Harlin, Richard Donner, Peter Hewitt, and Richard Stanley were considered to direct the film.

Director Danny Cannon was hired on the strength of his previous film, The Young Americans. Cannon was a long-time fan of the Judge Dredd comics. He created a mock-up poster for a Judge Dredd film that was published in Prog 534 of 2000 A.D. dated August 8, 1987. Cannon described his vision as "the Ben-Hur of comic book movies," and turned down an offer to direct Die Hard with a Vengeance to make the film.

=== Casting ===
Early in development, Arnold Schwarzenegger was considered for title role, before Sylvester Stallone was cast, even though Stallone had never heard of the character when he was cast. Cannon initially pursued Joe Pesci for the part of Fergie, but the actor turned it down.

Stallone and his co-star Armand Assante wore blue contact lenses to match von Sydow who plays their genetic 'father'. Assante deliberately mimicked Stallone's speech patterns to better reflect their characters' relationship as siblings.

Jürgen Prochnow, who played Judge Griffin, was coincidentally the longtime German-language dub actor for Stallone.

=== Design ===
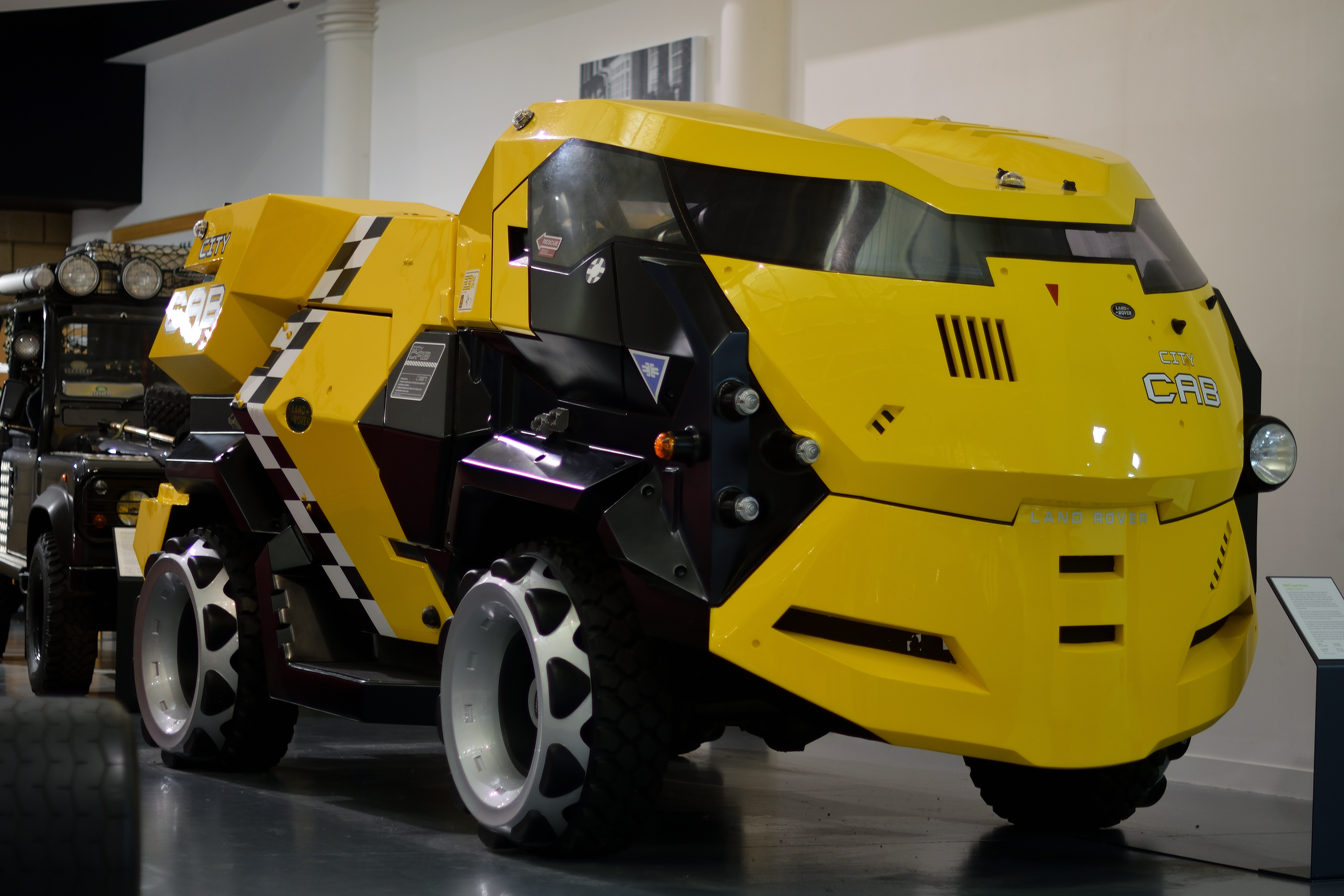
City Cab based on a Land Rover 101 Forward Control used in the film

The film's production designer was Nigel Phelps. Judge Dredd was his first feature film as sole production designer, he had previously worked on several high-profile music videos, and was a concept artist under Anton Furst. He hired Peter Young, with whom he had previously worked on Batman, as set decorator. Leslie Tomkins was the supervising art director.

Stallone personally selected Gianni Versace to design futuristic yet functional attire for the film. Versace created numerous rejected designs for Dredd's outfit, before landing on the final look.

The Statue of Liberty face was built in Lenox, Massachusetts, by a subsidiary of executive producer Andy Vajna's company Cinergi.

=== Special and visual effects ===
The visual effects were realized by Douglas Trumbull's company Massive Illusion, with designs by Kiesler-Walczak. Additional effects were provided by Digital FilmWorks, The Magic Camera Company, Amalgamated Pixels, and Atomic Pictures.

The prosthetic make-up designs for Mean Machine Angel were created by artist Chris Cunningham (credited as 'Chris Halls'), supervised by Nick Dudman.

The production initially intended to use an actor in a suit to depict the ABC Warrior, but Danny Cannon insisted they build it for real using animatronics. The hydraulics-powered effect was created by Joss Williams and controlled by five remote operators.

=== Filming ===
Filming took place at Shepperton Studios in England, with some location filming in Iceland. The producers initially wanted to shoot the film in the United States, but Cannon insisted on keeping production in the United Kingdom, the natural home of the character.

== Music ==
Although film composer David Arnold was originally set to score the film, having collaborated with director Danny Cannon on his previous film The Young Americans, Arnold was replaced by film composing veteran Jerry Goldsmith, but as post-production dates fell further and further behind, Goldsmith was forced to drop out of the project as well, due to prior commitments to score other films (First Knight and Congo). Prior to leaving the project, Goldsmith composed and recorded a short piece of music that would eventually be used for the film's trailers and advertising campaigns. In the end, Alan Silvestri was selected as the new composer and would go on to score the final film. He initially recorded the soundtrack with the Sinfonia of London. But following changes made to the film in post-production, Silvestri had to make extensive adjustments to his score by re-recording segues and cues in Hollywood, though some of the music from the London sessions remains in the finished film.

The end credits song for the film, "Dredd Song", was written and performed by the English alternative rock band the Cure. The song appears on disc three of their 2004 rarities box set Join the Dots: B-Sides & Rarities 1978–2001 (The Fiction Years) as well as on the film's soundtrack album. The song "Judge Yr'self" by the Manic Street Preachers was originally going to be on the soundtrack. Their guitarist Richey Edwards disappeared in early 1995, and since the song was the last written with him in the band, it never made it to the final soundtrack listing. The song was not released until 2003, when the band released Lipstick Traces (A Secret History of Manic Street Preachers).

In 1995, Epic Records released a soundtrack album featuring seven tracks from Silvestri's score (all performed by the Sinfonia of London but most were not versions used in the film) and songs by the Cure, The The, White Zombie, Cocteau Twins, Leftfield. The UK edition also had Ryo Aska and Worldbeaters with Youssou N'Dour (only the first two songs are heard in the film over the end credits).

In 2015, Intrada Records issued a greatly-expanded two-disc, limited-edition album featuring all the music Silvestri recorded for the film. The album also includes the trailer music conducted by Jerry Goldsmith. This had only previously released as a re-recording – conducted by Joel McNeely – on the Varèse Sarabande compilation entitled Hollywood '95.

== Release ==
Prior to the film's world premiere on 30 June 1995, Judge Dredd had to be re-cut and submitted to the MPAA five times in order to get it down from a NC-17 to a R rating. This was before Stallone and the studio tried to cut the film even further to get a PG-13 rating. Director Danny Cannon was so disheartened over the constant creative disputes with Stallone that he swore he would never again work with another big-name actor. He also stated that the final version was completely different from the script due to the creative changes demanded by Stallone. In later interviews, Stallone said he thought the film was supposed to be an action comedy film so demanded rewrites to make it more comedic. The director and screenwriter had a darker, more satirical vision.

Several entire sequences were deleted from the theatrical release to reduce the violence and darker tone of the film. For example, a scene where Rico kills news reporter Hammond and his wife was originally longer and bloodier because it showed them getting hit by bullets in slow-motion. Likewise the ABC Warrior robot was to kill Judge Griffin by ripping his arms and legs off but this was also changed. Cannon wanted more violence (because it was in keeping with the comic's source material) but the studio and Stallone wanted a PG-13 movie with more focus on humour. Even the film's climax was deleted, scenes showing Dredd fighting and killing clone Judges was removed prior to the theatrical release. Some promotional stills were published in Judge Dredd Megazine showing Dredd shooting one of the clones.

== Reception ==
=== Box office ===
The film was considered a box-office disappointment. It grossed $34.7 million in North American domestic box office receipts. It did better internationally, with $78.8 million internationally, reaching a total of $113.5 million worldwide against a production budget of $85-90 million.

=== Critical response ===
On Rotten Tomatoes the film has an approval rating of 22% based on reviews from 55 critics, with an average rating of 4.00/10; the site's critical consensus is "Judge Dredd wants to be both a legitimate violent action flick and a parody of one but director Danny Cannon fails to find the necessary balance to make it work." Audiences polled by CinemaScore gave the film an average grade of "B" on an A+ to F scale.

Gene Siskel named Judge Dredd one of the worst motion pictures of 1995 as part of his 'Worst of 1995' review on Siskel and Ebert. Roger Ebert, in his review for the Chicago Sun-Times, gave the film 2 out of 4 and wrote: "Stallone survives it, but his supporting cast, also including an uninvolved Joan Chen and a tremendously intense Jürgen Prochnow, isn't well used." Todd McCarthy of Variety called it "A thunderous, unoriginal futuristic hardware show for teenage boys." Owen Gleiberman of Entertainment Weekly gave it a grade of C+ and wrote: "The movie, by the end, practically seems intent on destroying itself." Jonathan Rosenbaum of the Chicago Reader gave a negative review: "Directed without inspiration by Danny Cannon from a stupid script by Michael De Luca, William Wisher, and Steven de Souza." Caryn James of The New York Times wrote: "Although it is full of noise and fake firepower, Dredd simply lies there on the screen until the final scenes." Mick LaSalle of the San Francisco Chronicle gave the film 1 out of 4, and wrote: "Usually engaging and sympathetic, Stallone is blank and tongue-tied here, an immovable slab in the midst of 95 minutes of gunfire, explosions and Gothic excess." Rita Kempley of The Washington Post wrote: "Aside from the affable Schneider and the able Lane, the cast seems to be in deep shock. Um, make that Dredd lock." James Berardinelli of ReelViews wrote: "Sometimes, it's rather amusing, but it's impossible to decide whether this is accidental or on purpose."

In a 2017 retrospective review Richard Trenholm from CNET wrote that the film "drew more more shrewdly on the comic's abundant history than the 2012 version" and "absolutely nailed the look of Mega City One". Trenholm noted that "sets, costumes and vehicles were fantastic", while "looming ABC warrior and grotesque Angel Gang" were "both triumphs of pre-CGI physical effects". In 2020, on the 25th Anniversary of the film, Drew Dietsch of Giant Freakin Robot praised the surface elements of the film "As a piece of pure production, [Judge Dredd] needs to be heralded as one of the best achievements of the '90s. Everything about the film's texture is a resounding success."

=== Other response ===
In 2008 Stallone discussed his feelings about the film in an issue of Uncut magazine:

I loved that property when I read it, because it took a genre that I love, what you could term the 'action morality film' and made it a bit more sophisticated. It had political overtones. It showed how if we don't curb the way we run our judicial system, the police may end up running our lives. It dealt with archaic governments; it dealt with cloning and all kinds of things that could happen in the future. It was also bigger than any film I've done in its physical stature and the way it was designed. All the people were dwarfed by the system and the architecture; it shows how insignificant human beings could be in the future. There's a lot of action in the movie and some great acting, too. It just wasn't balls to the wall. But I do look back on Judge Dredd as a real missed opportunity. It seemed that lots of fans had a problem with Dredd removing his helmet, because he never does in the comic books. But for me it is more about wasting such great potential there was in that idea; just think of all the opportunities there were to do interesting stuff with the Cursed Earth scenes. It didn't live up to what it could have been. It probably should have been much more comic, really humorous, and fun. What I learned out of that experience was that we shouldn't have tried to make it Hamlet; it's more Hamlet and Eggs.

He later elaborated:

From what I recall, the whole project was troubled from the beginning. The philosophy of the film was not set in stone – by that I mean "Is this going to be a serious drama or with comic overtones" like other science fiction films that were successful? So a lotta pieces just didn't fit smoothly. It was sort of like a feathered fish. Some of the design work on it was fantastic and the sets were incredibly real, even standing two feet away, but there was just no communication. I knew we were in for a long shoot when, for no explainable reason Danny Cannon, who's rather diminutive, jumped down from his director's chair and yelled to everyone within earshot, "FEAR me! Everyone should FEAR me!" then jumped back up to his chair as if nothing happened. The British crew was taking bets on his life expectancy.

Stallone admitted in 2010 to regret being involved with the film, calling it his "biggest mistake."

John Wagner, the creator of the comic character on which the film was based, said when interviewed by Empire in 2012: "the story had nothing to do with Judge Dredd, and Judge Dredd wasn't really Judge Dredd." Wagner said it was a pity the way the film turned out, since the production values were great, and they had the budget for it. In an interview with Total Film magazine, he said the film had "told the wrong story" because it "tried to do too much".

=== Accolades ===
At the 22nd Saturn Awards the film received nominations in four categories (Best Science Fiction Film, Best Special Effects, Best Costume and Best Make-up). Stallone received a Worst Actor nomination for his role as Judge Dredd at the 1995 Golden Raspberry Awards. At the 1995 Stinkers Bad Movie Awards, he won Worst Actor for his performance in the film and Assassins.

== Reboot ==
In 2012 a reboot starring Karl Urban, titled Dredd, was released. The reboot was considered by many critics to be a better film and more faithful to the source material, and has since acquired cult status.

== Other media ==
=== Video game ===
Video games based on the film were released in 1995 for contemporary consoles.

=== Novelizations and graphic novel ===
Two novels and a graphic novel were based on the movie:

- Judge Dredd by Neal Barrett, Jr. (June 1995, 250 pages, St Martins, ISBN 0-312-95628-2)
- Judge Dredd: The Junior Novelisation by Graham Marks (May 1995, 142 pages, Boxtree, ISBN 0-7522-0671-0)
- Judge Dredd: The Official Movie Adaptation by Andrew Helfer and Carlos Ezquerra (June 1995, 64 pages, DC Comics, ISBN 1-56389-245-6)

A newspaper strip adaptation by John Wagner and Ron Smith was serialized in News of the World.
