= Jacob's Ladder (1990 film) =

Film by Adrian Lyne

- Theatrical release poster
- Directed by: Adrian Lyne
- Written by: Bruce Joel Rubin
- Produced by: Alan Marshall; Mario Kassar
- Starring: Tim Robbins; Elizabeth Peña; Danny Aiello
- Cinematography: Jeffrey L. Kimball
- Edited by: Tom Rolf
- Music by: Maurice Jarre
- Production company: Carolco Pictures
- Distributed by: Tri-Star Pictures
- Release date: November 2, 1990 (United States)
- Running time: 113 minutes
- Country: United States
- Language: English
- Budget: $25 million
- Box office: $26.1 million

Jacob's Ladder is a 1990 American psychological horror film directed by Adrian Lyne, produced by Alan Marshall and written by Bruce Joel Rubin. It stars Tim Robbins as Jacob Singer, a New Yorker whose experiences during his military service in Vietnam result in bizarre hallucinations. The supporting cast includes Elizabeth Peña and Danny Aiello.

Jacob's Ladder was produced by Carolco Pictures and released by Tri-Star Pictures on November 2, 1990, ten years after being written by Rubin. The film garnered a cult following, and its plot and special effects became a source of influence for various other works, such as the Silent Hill video game and film series. A remake was released in 2019.

== Plot ==
On October 6, 1971, American infantryman Jacob Singer is with the 1st Air Cavalry Division, deployed in a village in Vietnam's Mekong Delta, when his unit comes under attack. As many of Jacob's comrades are killed or wounded, others exhibit abnormal behavior with some suffering catatonia, convulsions, and seizures. Jacob flees into the jungle and is stabbed with a bayonet.

Jacob awakens on the New York City Subway and glimpses a tentacle protruding from a sleeping homeless person. When he finds the subway station exit locked, he crosses the tracks and is almost hit by a train. The year is 1975; Jacob is a postal worker and lives in a rundown apartment in Brooklyn with his girlfriend, Jezebel Pipkin. Jacob misses his old family and experiences visions of them, especially the youngest of his sons, Gabe, who had died in an accident before the war. Jacob is beset by disturbing experiences and apparitions, including glimpses of faceless vibrating figures, and narrowly escapes being run over by a pursuing car. He attempts to contact his regular doctor Carlson at the local VA hospital but is informed that there is no record of him ever being a patient there and that Dr. Carlson has died in a car explosion.

At a party thrown by friends, a psychic reads Jacob's palm and tells him that he is already dead, which Jacob dismisses as a joke. After declining to dance with her, he appears to witness an enormous creature dancing sexually with Jezebel before killing her; Jacob collapses. At home, Jacob experiences a dangerous fever, which Jezebel attempts to bring down with a painful ice bath. Jacob wakes up in another reality where he lives with his wife Sarah and sons, including Gabe. In Vietnam, a wounded Jacob is evacuated under fire in a helicopter, which is subsequently shot down.

One of Jacob's former platoon mates, Paul Gruneger, contacts him to reveal he is suffering from similar experiences. Shortly after, Paul is killed when his car explodes. Commiserating after the funeral, other surviving members of the platoon confess that they have all been experiencing horrifying hallucinations. Believing that they are suffering the effects of a military experiment performed on them without their knowledge or consent, they hire Geary, a lawyer, to investigate. However, Geary quits the case after reading military files documenting that the soldiers were never in combat and were discharged for psychological reasons. Jacob's comrades back down, while Jacob suspects they have been threatened into doing so. Jacob is then abducted by suited men, who attempt to intimidate him. Jacob fights them and escapes but is injured and nearly paralyzed in the process. He is taken to a nightmarish hospital, where he is told he has been killed and this is his home, but his chiropractor friend Louis Denardo comes to his rescue and heals him. Louis quotes the 14th-century Christian mystic Meister Eckhart, who said that one must make peace with death to realize that the "devils tearing your life away" are instead "angels, freeing you from the earth".

Jacob is approached by a distressed man who has been following him from a distance and who had dragged Jacob away from Paul's burning car. Introducing himself as Michael Newman, he tells a story of having been a chemist with the Army's chemical warfare division where he designed a drug he called the Ladder, which massively increased aggression. Michael claims that to test the drug's effectiveness, a dose was secretly given to Jacob's unit before the battle, causing some of them to turn on each other in a homicidal frenzy. Michael's story triggers a vision of Jacob wounded in Vietnam, which shows his attacker as a fellow American soldier. Jacob returns to his family's home, where Gabe leads him up the staircase into a bright light.

In a triage tent in 1971, military medics declare Jacob dead, saying that he had fought to stay alive but now looks peaceful.

== Cast ==
- Tim Robbins as Jacob "Professor" Singer
- Elizabeth Peña as Jezebel "Jezzie" Pipkin
- Danny Aiello as Louis "Louie" Denardo
- Matt Craven as Michael Newman
- Pruitt Taylor Vince as Paul Gruneger
- Jason Alexander as Mr. Geary
- Patricia Kalember as Sarah Singer
- S. Epatha Merkerson as Elsa
- Eriq La Salle as Frank
- Ving Rhames as George
- Brian Tarantina as Doug
- Suzanne Shepherd as Hospital Receptionist
- Lewis Black as Jacob's Doctor
- Macaulay Culkin as Gabriel "Gabe" Singer

== Production ==
The horror of the movie would be in the revelation that hope is hell's final torment, that life is a dream that ends over and over with the final truth: that life was never real, that we are all creatures trapped in eternal suffering and damnation.

— Bruce Joel Rubin

The title refers to the Biblical story of Jacob's Ladder, or the dream of a meeting place between Heaven and Earth (Genesis 28:12). The film's alternative title is Dante's Inferno, in a reference to Inferno by Dante Alighieri. Screenwriter and co-producer Bruce Joel Rubin perceived the film as a modern interpretation of the Liberation Through Hearing During the Intermediate State, the Tibetan Book of the Dead. Rubin said: "The inspiration in a sense is my entire spiritual upbringing. Once you have a meditative life you start to see that the world is really far different than what it appears to be. What appears to be finite is really couched in the infinite, and the infinite imbues everything in our lives." Before writing Jacob's Ladder and Ghost, also released in 1990, the Jewish-born Rubin spent two years in a Tibetan Buddhist monastery in Nepal. Previously, he had also written the afterlife-themed films Brainstorm and Deadly Friend.

Rubin began work in 1980, inspired by a nightmare in which he dreamt about being trapped in a New York City Subway station. For several years, he failed to sell the script. He was given offers from studios specializing in low-budget horror productions, but waited for better funded studios and directors. The script began attracting attention after American Film named it as one of the top ten unproduced screenplays. Thom Mount of Universal Pictures said he "loved it, but it was not for his studio". Directors Michael Apted, Sidney Lumet and Ridley Scott all expressed an interest, but still no major studio was ready to invest in Rubin's "too metaphysical" stories as "Hollywood does not make ghost movies". Eventually, after Deadly Friend was filmed by Wes Craven in 1986, Rubin's screenplays for Jacob's Ladder and Ghost were picked by Paramount Pictures.

In 1988, Adrian Lyne, who described the script as one of the best he had read, decided to direct Jacob's Ladder instead of an adaptation of The Bonfire of the Vanities as he had originally planned. The project was canceled following ownership and policy changes at Paramount; the executives had doubts about the ending and the scenes in Vietnam. The independent film studio Carolco Pictures took over the production, giving Lyne a greater creative control and a budget of $25 million. Rubin became the co-producer, along with Mario Kassar, Alan Marshall and Andrew G. Vajna.

I can see why people didn't want to make it for so long. It reads like a novel, and it's very intimidating because it's written so descriptively. Bruce had these very literal images of heaven and hell that I didn't know how to bring off. How do you introduce a character with horns?

— Adrian Lyne

Lyne, who downplayed Rubin's "intimidating" Old Testament themes, prepared by watching documentary films about the war in Vietnam and reading chronicles of near-death experiences. The plot device of a long period of subjective time passing in an instant was inspired by Robert Enrico's 1962 short film An Occurrence at Owl Creek Bridge, one of Lyne's favorite films. Lyne said Jacob's Ladder depicted "a man's dying process ... while he remembers his wife and kid and while he imagines a life with Jezzie that he's never had. So it's his memory and imagination and essentially the whole film is just in his mind." The cinematographer Jeffrey L. Kimball based the dream sequences on the art of Francis Bacon.

Tim Robbins and Elizabeth Peña were among the first to audition for the roles of Jacob Singer and Jezzie Pipkin but Carolco Pictures demanded more established stars. Dustin Hoffman, Richard Gere and Al Pacino were considered for Jacob, while Andie MacDowell, Julia Roberts, Demi Moore and Madonna were considered for Jezzie. Lyne cast Robbins and Peña anyway. Robbins said the film presented for him "a great opportunity to go in a different direction. I love doing comedy, but I know I can do other things as well."

Filming began in New York City on September 11, 1989, on location in Staten Island, Queens and Brooklyn. Jacob and Jezzie's apartment was filmed on a soundstage on West 23rd Street, while the subway dream sequences were shot on an abandoned level of Bergen Street station. The Seaview Hospital of Staten Island; the Essex County Veterans Courthouse of Newark, New Jersey; and Madison Square Garden were also used. The military advisor was Vietnam veteran Captain Dale Dye, who provided a five-day boot camp training for the actors playing soldiers in the Vietnam storyline (including Robbins, Pruitt Taylor Vince, Eriq La Salle and Ving Rhames). The war scenes were filmed in the jungles near Vega Baja, Puerto Rico, featuring the UH-1 helicopters provided by the Puerto Rico National Guard. Filming concluded at Tortuguero Lagoon in January 1990 with a $40 million budget.

The special effect sequences were filmed in camera, without post-production effects. In several scenes, Lyne used a body horror technique in which an actor is recorded shaking his head around at a low frame rate, resulting in horrifically fast motion when played back. Lyne said he was inspired by the art of the painter Francis Bacon when developing the effect. In his screenplay, Rubin used traditional imagery of demons and Hell. However, Lyne decided to use images similar to thalidomide deformities to achieve a greater shock effect. After many heated arguments, Lyne persuaded Rubin. Lyne and Rubin were influenced by the work by the artist H. R. Giger, the photographers Diane Arbus and Joel-Peter Witkin, and the Brothers Quay's 1986 stop motion short film Street of Crocodiles.

Vietnam was really a means to an end. It was a plot device rather than something we were trying to make a huge issue of.

— Alan Marshall

At the end of the film, a message is displayed saying the Pentagon denied that the Army tested BZ, a hallucinogen, on its soldiers during the Vietnam War. Lyne said a part of the inspiration for this motif was Martin A. Lee's book Acid Dreams: The CIA, LSD and Sixties Rebellion, but noted that "nothing in the book suggests that the drug BZ ... was used on U.S. troops". According to Lyne's audio commentary, test audiences found the first version of the film overwhelming, and so about 20 minutes of disturbing scenes, mostly from the last third of the film, were removed.

== Release ==
=== Theatrical release ===
Jacob's Ladder opened on November 2, 1990, distributed by TriStar Pictures. Jacob's Ladder: Original Motion Picture Soundtrack with the music by Maurice Jarre was released by Varèse Sarabande in 1993 and then by Waxwork Records in March 2020 on a single LP. Rubin's companion book, released by Applause Theater Book Publishers on the same day as the film, features a final draft of the screenplay, including the deleted scenes, and his essay on making of the screenplay and the film.

=== Home media ===
The Special Edition DVD was released by Artisan Entertainment on July 14, 1998, containing three deleted scenes ("Jezzie's Transformation", "The Antidote" and "The Train Station") along with several other special features, such as audio commentary by Adrian Lyne and a 26-minute making-of documentary "Building Jacob's Ladder". On September 14, 2010, the film was released on Blu-ray Disc by Lions Gate Entertainment and retains all of the special features of the DVD version, along with two promotional trailers, omitting only a TV spot that came with the DVD.

== Reception ==
=== Box office ===
The film took the number one spot at the weekend box office in North America, garnering ticket sales of $7.5 million from 1,052 screens. However, the attendance dropped fast and its overall domestic box office result was only $26,118,851.

=== Critical reception ===
On review aggregator Rotten Tomatoes, 72% of 68 reviews are positive, with an average rating of 6.6/10. The site's consensus reads: "Even with its disorienting leaps of logic and structure, Jacob's Ladder is an engrossing, nerve-shattering experience". On Metacritic, the film has a score of 62 out of 100 based on reviews from 20 critics, indicating "generally favorable" reviews. Audiences polled by CinemaScore gave the film an average grade of "C−" on an A+ to F scale.

Roger Ebert of the Chicago Sun-Times wrote that Jacob's Ladder left him "reeling with turmoil and confusion, with feelings of sadness and despair," and called it a "thoroughly painful and depressing experience — but, it must be said, one that has been powerfully written, directed and acted." He awarded it three and a half out of four. Janet Maslin of The New York Times wrote that this "slick, riveting, viscerally scary film about what in other hands would be a decidedly unsalable subject, namely death" is "both quaint and devastating."

Desson Thomson of The Washington Post wrote that the film is "ultimately flat on its surrealistic face, the victim of too many fake-art sequences". Owen Gleiberman of Entertainment Weekly wrote that "Jacob's Ladder is so 'dark' it sucks Robbins right down with it. By the time Jacob is being strapped to a bed and wheeled down a hospital corridor strewn with bloody limbs, it's hard to care whether the Orwellian image is a hallucination or not. You just want out." Kim Newman called the film "effectively the blunt remake" of Carnival of Souls.

According to IGN's review of the DVD release in 2004, "After movies like Se7en, it may not pack the same subtle horror for today's audiences it did when it was first released, but it's still a great film." IGN's review of Jacob's Ladder's 2010 Blu-ray release called it "an emotionally poignant, creepy horror masterpiece." According to Slant Magazine, Jacob's Ladder is "a bizarrely cohesive hybrid of war movie, character study, art film, and horror flick" and "the very act of watching the film is so emotionally draining that the viewer leaves the film feeling worked-in; the thought of repeat viewings is daunting yet insatiable." John Kenneth Muir called the nightmarish hospital scene "one of the most terrifying moments in all of 1990s horror cinema". Muir further wrote: "In its musings about death, about the end we all fear, Jacob's Ladder proves a deeply affecting and meaningful motion picture. After a screening, you'll immediately want to hug the people you love and then go outside and breathe the fresh air, or otherwise affirm your very existence."

Rubin's script was included on the list of "Hollywood's ten best unproduced screenplays" by American Film in 1983. In 1991, Jacob's Ladder was nominated at Horror Hall of Fame II for best horror film of the year, losing to The Silence of the Lambs. The film was also featured in Bravo's 2004 documentary miniseries The 100 Scariest Movie Moments and in the 2009 book 1001 Movies You Must See Before You Die. In 2013, the Jacob Burns Film Center projectionist Andrew Robinson chose it as his favorite scary film. LA Weekly listed this film in the vetsploitation subgenre.

== Legacy ==
Jacob's Ladder greatly inspired the Silent Hill horror franchise, including the 2006 film adaptation by Christophe Gans. The film's influence on their works was also recognized by Ryan Murphy, writer of the 2011 TV series American Horror Story: Asylum, and by Shinji Mikami, creator of the Resident Evil series and director of the 2014 video game The Evil Within. Kim Manners prepared for directing The X-Files third season episode "Grotesque" by listening to the music from Jacob's Ladder. The music video for the 2010 song "Nightmare" by Avenged Sevenfold is a homage to the famous hospital scene from the film, chosen by the director Wayne Isham, because the band's deceased drummer The Rev was a fan of the film. Director Christopher Nolan has said that Jacob's Ladder, specifically its use of abstract imagery, was an influence on his 2023 film Oppenheimer.

Several direct references to Jacob's Ladder exist within the Silent Hill games, particularly Silent Hill 2 (2001), whose plot is largely inspired by the film; the head-twitching effect seen in the film recurs throughout the game series, and in Silent Hill 2, the protagonist, James Sunderland, wears an M-1965 field jacket nearly identical to the one Jacob wears in the film. Gans said his 2026 film Return to Silent Hill "tells the same story" as Jacob's Ladder as "everything happens in the last glimpse of consciousness" and thus he also hid the references to the film within his adaptation. Other references to the film itself include the mentions in the 2002 The Twilight Zone episode "Night Route" (dialog) and the 2010 The Simpsons season 21 episode "The Squirt and the Whale" (visual). Rick and Morty refers to the film in the 2020 season 4 episode "Never Ricking Morty" with a flashback when Morty Smith (Justin Roiland) stabs Rick Sanchez (Roiland) with a bayonet, reminiscent of what happens to Jacob at the beginning of the film.

In music, Claytown Troupe used a sample of Michael Newman (Matt Craven)'s quote 'It's a fast trip ... ' at the beginning of the track "Rainbow's Edge" from their 1991 album Out There. UNKLE sampled dialogue from the film in their 1998 song "Rabbit in Your Headlights" (featuring Thom Yorke) from their album Psyence Fiction and again in 2003 in "Inside" from their album Never, Never, Land. VNV Nation's track "Forsaken" from the 1998 album Praise the Fallen ends with the quotation from Meister Eckhart. "Devils" from IVardensphere's 2011 album APOK begins with the same quotation. A sample of Jacob's cry 'Stop it, you're killing me!' is used in "Next in Line" from Nevermore's 1996 album The Politics of Ecstasy. Biosphere's track "City Wakes Up" from his 2001 album Man with a Movie Camera features a sample of departing train sounds from the subway scene.

The film's possible influence can be arguably seen in many other works ranging from M. Night Shyamalan's 1999 hit psychological horror film The Sixth Sense to Peter Arnett's controversial 1998 CNN report "Valley of Death" about the 1970 Operation Tailwind. Jeff Millar of Houston Chronicle wrote that Giuseppe Tornatore's 1994 psychological thriller A Pure Formality uses the plot device of Jacob's Ladder mixed with several other sources. According to Premiere, Massy Tadjedin's 2005 psychological thriller The Jacket "is a film for those who don't remember Jacob's Ladder, perhaps for someone like Jacob himself," as it "resembles Jacob's Ladder too much for its own good."

Jacob's Ladder is a longtime running gag on the podcast How Did This Get Made?, in which a group of comedians examines various movies that are deemed bad. At some point in every episode, either co-host Jason Mantzoukas or an audience member will posit that week's film might be "a Jacob's Ladder situation."

== Remake ==
A remake directed by David M. Rosenthal and written by Jeff Buhler, Sarah Thorp and Jake Wade Wall was released in 2019, to negative reception. The film stars Michael Ealy, Jesse Williams, Nicole Beharie, Karla Souza and Guy Burnet.

== See also ==
- List of anti-war films
- List of films featuring hallucinogens
- List of nonlinear narrative films
- Paranoid fiction
- Unethical human experimentation in the United States
- Vietnam War in film
