= Andrew G. Vajna =

Hungarian film producer (1944–2019)

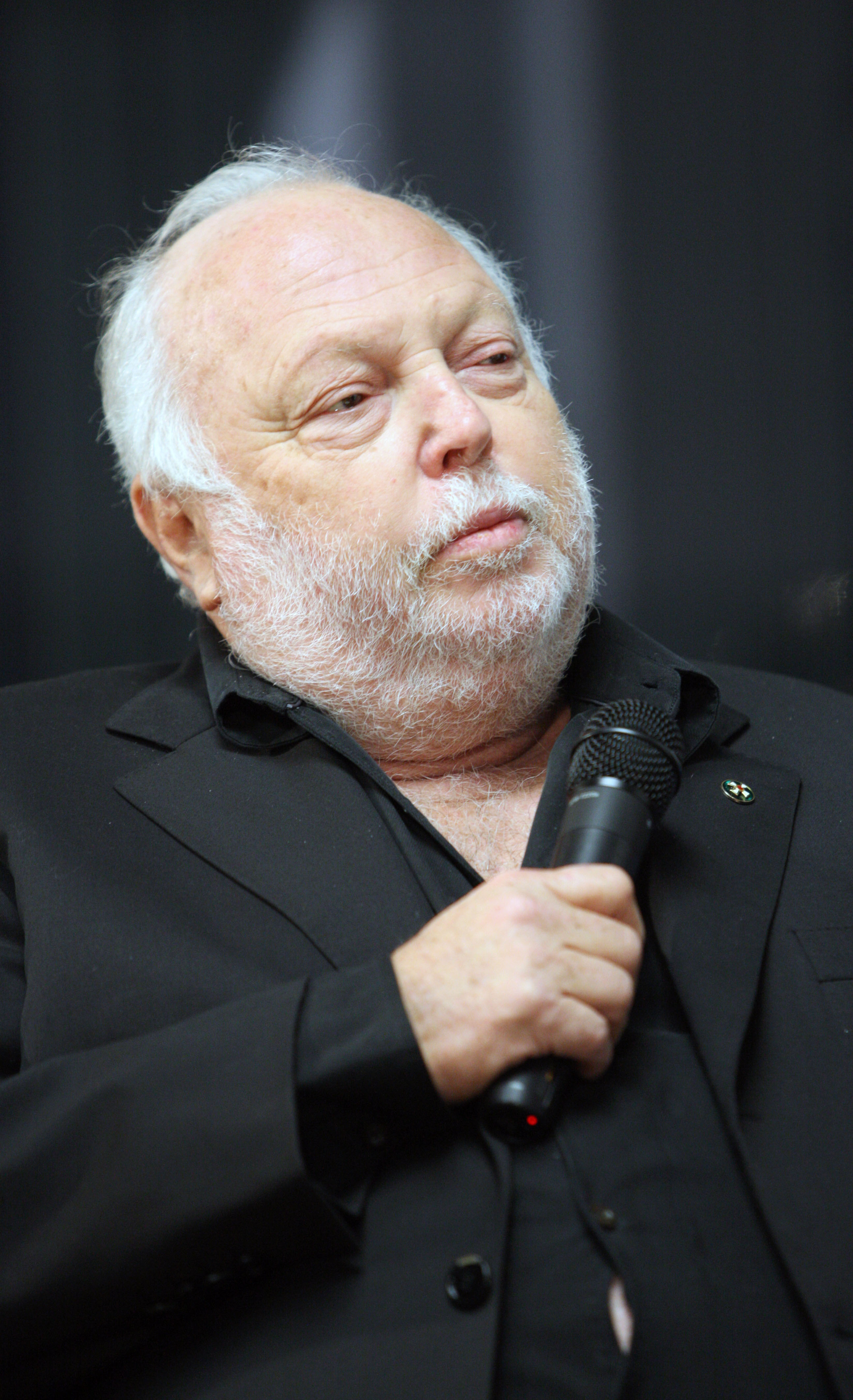
- Vajna in 2013
- Born: András György Vajna; 1 August 1944; Budapest, Hungary
- Died: 20 January 2019 (aged 74); Budapest, Hungary
- Resting place: Kerepesi Cemetery
- Education: University of California, Los Angeles
- Occupation: Film producer
- Years active: 1975–2009
- Spouse: Tímea Palácsik (m. 2013)

Andrew G. Vajna (born András György Vajna; 1 August 1944 – 20 January 2019) was a Hungarian film producer. He produced films including the first three entries in the Rambo series, Total Recall, Tombstone, Die Hard with a Vengeance, Evita, and Terminator 3. Vajna founded the now-defunct production companies Carolco Pictures, Cinergi Pictures, and C2 Pictures, frequently in collaboration with Mario Kassar.

== Biography ==
=== Early life and first business successes ===
Andrew G. Vajna was born in Budapest to merchant György Vajna (born Weidmann) and his wife Klára. His family was Jewish. In 1956, at the age of 12, he fled Hungary and with the support of Red Cross made his way alone to Canada. He arrived having no friends and speaking no English. He would reunite with his parents in Los Angeles after they fled Hungary separately. He studied cinematography at University of California, Los Angeles, then joined the university's Educational Motion Picture Department, where he worked on various projects.

Preferring independence, Vajna left UCLA to establish a photo studio, but that venture soon came to end when he broke his leg in a ski accident and the business could not operate for nine months. After his recovery, he became a hairdresser and teamed up with a boyhood friend, Gábor Koltai, a wig stylist in Hollywood, to produce high-quality wigs. Vajna moved to Hong Kong, where he established a wig-manufacturing company, Gilda Fashion. When Vajna sold the firm in 1973, it employed more than 3,000 people.

=== Entering the film industry – The Carolco times ===
Vajna launched his career in the entertainment industry by buying cinemas in the Far East. He founded Panasia Films Limited in Hong Kong, which became a highly profitable venture in the distribution, acquisition, and representation of films. Vajna sold Panasia to Raymond Chow's Golden Harvest Company in 1976.

The previous year, he met film producer and industry executive Mario Kassar at the 1975 Cannes Film Festival. The duo founded Carolco to finance, sell, and distribute films worldwide. They rented a small office on Melrose Avenue where their desks faced each other; their secretaries were Vajna's wife and Kassar's girlfriend. In less than four years, Carolco became one of the top three foreign sales organizations in motion pictures industry.

In 1982, Vajna helped establish the American Film Marketing Association, and Vajna and Kassar made their film production debut with Rambo: First Blood, starring Sylvester Stallone. First Blood was a success, grossing $120 million internationally. Rambo: First Blood Part II was released in 1985, generating more than $300 million worldwide.

Vajna was executive producer with Mario Kassar on such films such as Alan Parker's Angel Heart, and Rambo III. Other projects include Music Box, Mountains of the Moon, Total Recall, Air America, Narrow Margin and Jacob's Ladder.

=== Cinergi Productions Inc. ===
In December 1989, Vajna sold all his interest in Carolco for $106 million and formed Cinergi Productions, Inc. to engage in the financing, development, production and distribution of major event motion pictures. As part of its business plan, Cinergi formed an alliance with The Walt Disney Company for distribution of Cinergi motion pictures in the United States, Canada and Latin America. Vajna's strategy was to develop long-term relationships with certain talent and produce a steady supply of two to four event motion pictures per year. John McTiernan directed Cinergi's first production, Medicine Man. Christmas 1993 saw the release of Tombstone, the Wyatt Earp/Doc Holliday legend. In 1994, Cinergi released Renaissance Man and Color of Night.

The summer of 1995 saw the release of two Cinergi productions. The first was Die Hard with a Vengeance. To date, the film has grossed over $365 million worldwide. The second release was Judge Dredd. Also in 1995, Cinergi released two more films: The Scarlet Letter and Nixon. Nixon received four Academy Award nominations.

Another Cinergi release was Alan Parker's adaptation of Andrew Lloyd Webber and Tim Rice's rock opera Evita starring Madonna and Antonio Banderas in 1996. Nominated for five Academy Awards, the film was also a commercial success, grossing $141 million worldwide and winning Golden Globes for Best Picture, Best Actress and Best Original Song.

=== Back to his roots, entering the Hungarian film industry ===
Vajna never forgot his Hungarian roots and always tried to help the Hungarian film industry. He had a major role in many films being shot in Budapest, such as Evita, Escape to Victory and Red Heat.

He also participated in the distribution of Motion Pictures in Hungary eventually having a 70% share of the Hungarian box office. In 1989 Vajna founded InterCom that has become a market-leader and a distributor of many Hollywood studios, including 20th Century Fox, Warner Bros., Sony Pictures, Disney and MGM.

He was a producer of the record-breaking Hungarian comedy Out of Order aired in 1997. With 750,000 viewers in cinemas and several million on television it broke Hungarian box office records.

In 1998, Vajna took Cinergi private by buying out the public stockholders. Thereafter, he joined with his former partner, Mario Kassar, and started C2 Pictures. Their first return venture into big budget Hollywood was I Spy (2002), starring Eddie Murphy and Owen Wilson, which was shot in Budapest.

In 2002 he founded DIGIC Pictures in Hungary which is an animation studio specializing in full 3D animation and visual effects.

In 2003, he and Kassar produced Terminator 3: Rise of the Machines with Arnold Schwarzenegger.

In 2005 Vajna was, together with Quentin Tarantino and Lucy Liu, the executive producer of a feature-length documentary called Freedom's Fury, created by Colin Keith Gray and Megan Raney Aarons, which showed his renewed interest in the story of the 1956 Hungarian Revolution. The film called The Children of Glory, which showed the Hungarian Revolution of 1956, was Hungary's most successful movie in 2006 having been viewed by more than half a million people.

=== Reformer of the Hungarian film funding system ===
From 2011 Vajna worked as the Government Commissioner in charge of the Hungarian film industry. In the same year Vajna conceived Hungarian National Film Fund with the mission to contribute to the production of Hungarian films or co-productions that provide art and entertainment for moviegoers and bring significant success both domestically and on an international level. Under Vajna's supervision, the money spent on film production in Hungary had doubled between 2011 and 2014. The Film Fund provides transparent financial and professional support as well as creative cooperation, marketing support, professional expertise and international industry contacts, handling festivals, sales activity and apprentice program.

One of the recent films that received financial support from Hungarian National Film Fund was the hard-hitting drama Son of Saul, which premiered at the 2015 Cannes Film Festival where it won the Grand Prix. It also won the Golden Globe for Best Foreign Language Film, becoming the first Hungarian film to win the award. As its biggest achievement, Son of Saul was the 2016 Academy Award winner in the foreign language category.

During the Vajna era Hungarian movies financed by the Hungarian National Film Fund won altogether more than 130 international awards while the number of foreign films produced in Hungary increased significantly.

=== Media holdings and links with Viktor Orbán's government ===
Following his return to his native country, Vajna played an important role in Viktor Orbán's government's influence on the media. In 2015 he bought the Hungarian TV2 Group, the country's second-biggest commercial channel. The state-owned lender Eximbank, which usually supports export companies, helped Vajna's acquisition. In 2015, TV2 won nearly a fifth of state advertising spending, four times more than its nearest rival, according to the independent Hungarian watchdog Mérték Media Monitor. Under Vajna's ownership, the channel's editorial stance was strongly in favour of the government. From 2016 until his death he also owned the Rádió 1 radio station. In 2017 he bought Lapcom Zrt. which includes the tabloid Bors, and the regional dailies Délmagyarország and Kisalföld.

== Personal life and death ==
Vajna had a son named Justin, who committed suicide on March 2, 2007, at the age of 26. Justin was suffering from schizophrenia. Vajna died of a heart attack at his home in Budapest on 20 January 2019 at age 74.

== Filmography ==
| Year | Title | Notes |
|---|---|---|
| 1973 | Deadly China Doll | producer |
| 1980 | The Changeling | executive producer |
| 1981 | Escape to Victory | executive producer |
| 1981 | The Amateur | executive producer |
| 1982 | First Blood | executive producer |
| 1982 | Superstition | executive producer |
| 1985 | Rambo: First Blood Part II | executive producer |
| 1987 | Angel Heart | executive producer |
| 1987 | Extreme Prejudice | executive producer |
| 1988 | Rambo III | executive producer |
| 1988 | Red Heat | executive producer |
| 1989 | DeepStar Six | executive producer |
| 1989 | Johnny Handsome | executive producer |
| 1989 | Music Box | executive producer |
| 1990 | Mountains of the Moon | executive producer |
| 1990 | Total Recall | executive producer |
| 1990 | Air America | executive producer |
| 1990 | Narrow Margin | executive producer |
| 1990 | Jacob's Ladder | executive producer |
| 1992 | Medicine Man | producer |
| 1993 | Tombstone | executive producer |
| 1994 | Renaissance Man | producer |
| 1994 | Color of Night | executive producer |
| 1995 | Die Hard with a Vengeance | executive producer |
| 1995 | Judge Dredd | executive producer |
| 1995 | The Scarlet Letter | producer |
| 1995 | Nixon | producer |
| 1996 | Amanda | producer |
| 1996 | Evita | producer |
| 1997 | Shadow Conspiracy | executive producer |
| 1997 | A Miniszter félrelép | producer |
| 1998 | An Alan Smithee Film: Burn Hollywood Burn | executive producer |
| 1999 | The 13th Warrior | executive producer |
| 2000 | A Holocaust szemei | executive producer |
| 2001 | An American Rhapsody | executive producer |
| 2002 | I Spy | producer |
| 2003 | Terminator 3: Rise of the Machines | producer |
| 2006 | Children of Glory | producer |
| 2006 | Freedom's Fury | executive producer |
| 2006 | Basic Instinct 2 | producer |
| 2008–2009 | Terminator: The Sarah Connor Chronicles | executive producer |
| 2009 | Terminator Salvation | executive producer |
