= Die Hard with a Vengeance =

1995 film by John McTiernan

- Theatrical release poster
- Directed by: John McTiernan
- Written by: Jonathan Hensleigh
- Based on: Characters by Roderick Thorp
- Produced by: John McTiernan; Michael Tadross
- Starring: Bruce Willis; Jeremy Irons; Samuel L. Jackson; Graham Greene; Colleen Camp; Larry Bryggman; Sam Phillips
- Cinematography: Peter Menzies Jr.
- Edited by: John Wright
- Music by: Michael Kamen
- Production companies: 20th Century Fox; Cinergi Pictures
- Distributed by: 20th Century Fox
- Release date: May 19, 1995 (United States)
- Running time: 128 minutes
- Country: United States
- Language: English
- Budget: $90 million
- Box office: $366 million

Die Hard with a Vengeance is a 1995 American action film directed and produced by John McTiernan, written by Jonathan Hensleigh, and starring Bruce Willis as John McClane. It is the sequel to Die Hard 2 (1990) and the third installment in the Die Hard film series. The film also stars Jeremy Irons and Samuel L. Jackson, and features Graham Greene, Colleen Camp, Larry Bryggman, Sam Phillips and Tony Halme.

In the film, NYPD Lieutenant John McClane is embroiled in a plot by a mysterious terrorist calling himself "Simon" (Irons), who extorts the city of New York by threatening to detonate several bombs unless McClane solves a series of games scattered across the city. McClane reluctantly partners with a shopkeeper named Zeus Carver (Jackson), and learns the terrorists plot to steal the gold bullion of the Federal Reserve Bank of New York.

Adapted from a spec script written by Hensleigh, Die Hard with a Vengeance was the first film in the series not directly based on a literary source material, and the first not to be produced by Joel Silver and Lawrence Gordon after both producers had a fall-out with Willis, instead being produced by Andrew G. Vajna’s Cinergi Pictures. Principal photography took place in New York City and South Carolina.

The film was released on May 19, 1995 by 20th Century Fox and grossed $366 million worldwide, becoming the highest-grossing film of the year, and initially received mixed reviews from critics. However, the film has received positive reevaluation over time and is now largely considered the best sequel in the franchise. (Note: Attributed to multiple references:) The film was followed by Live Free or Die Hard in 2007 and A Good Day to Die Hard in 2013.

== Plot ==
Several months after the airport incident (Note: As depicted in Die Hard 2 (1990)), in New York City, the Bonwit Teller department store is blown up by a bomb during the morning commute. A man identifying himself as "Simon" telephones the New York Police Department (NYPD) and claims responsibility. Making demands in the form of a "Simon Says" game, he threatens to detonate another bomb unless Police Lieutenant John McClane is sent to Harlem wearing a sandwich board with an intentionally provocative racial slur written on it. The NYPD comply and send McClane to Harlem, where he is confronted by a black electrician and shop owner named Zeus Carver. McClane explains his situation before a group of black men also confront McClane over his sign. Carver intervenes and saves McClane, and they escape in a taxi.

They arrive at 1 Police Plaza, where Simon demands that the pair follow a timed challenge or he will set off more bombs. They agree and McClane eventually boards the 3 train heading towards the Wall Street station in order to defuse a bomb that Simon planted on it. Carver arrives at the station before McClane, who finds the bomb and throws it from the train onto the tracks just as it explodes. McClane and Carver regroup with the NYPD and meet some FBI and CIA agents, who initially inform the pair that Simon is "Peter Krieg", a mercenary and former colonel in the East German National People's Army. They then reveal that Krieg's real name is Simon Peter Gruber, the brother of Hans Gruber, whom McClane killed years earlier in Los Angeles. (Note: As depicted in Die Hard (1988).)

Simon then places another call to the NYPD, informing them that he has planted an explosive in one of the city's elementary schools which is set to explode once class ends and can be triggered by the same radio frequencies used by law enforcement. Simon offers to give the authorities the school's location if McClane and Carver follow another timed challenge, warning that he will detonate the explosive if any evacuation attempts are carried out. While the pair solve Simon's next challenge, the NYPD begin to search all elementary schools in the city. McClane realizes that Simon is attempting to distract the NYPD away from Wall Street, which has no schools, and travels to the Federal Reserve Bank of New York Building. He discovers that Simon's men have stolen $140 billion of gold bullion from its vault using dump trucks. He follows the trucks into the under-construction New York City Water Tunnel No. 3 while Carver continues Simon's challenges.

Simon blows up a cofferdam to flood the tunnel, but McClane escapes and reunites with Carver. Surviving a car chase with Simon's men, the pair find all the men were carrying exactly enough money to pay a bridge toll. They track the trucks to a roll-on/roll-off vessel leaving Long Island Sound, which they hastily jump onto, but Simon's associates capture them and tie them up next to a bomb. Simon explains that his school threat was fake and broadcasts a message claiming that he is planning on destroying the ship filled with the bullion to destabilize the Western world's economy. After he leaves, Carver and McClane free themselves and escape the ship just before the bomb detonates. As McClane and Carver are debriefed by the NYPD, McClane informs them that none of the bullion Simon's men stole was in the ship's cargo hold, having deduced that Simon had intended to keep all of it for himself, using his knowledge of the Gruber family's modus operandi.

While attempting to place a call to his estranged wife Holly, McClane glances at a bottle of aspirin given to him by Simon on board the ship and notices that it was purchased at a truck stop in Quebec on the Canada–United States border. McClane informs the NYPD of his discovery, and joins them and Carver as they rush towards a warehouse near the truck stop where Simon and his men are redistributing the bullion and planning their escape. The rest of Simon's men are quickly apprehended by law enforcement personnel, though Simon and his girlfriend Katya attempt to escape in a helicopter, attacking McClane. McClane shoots at an overhead power line which the helicopter tries to dodge, only to hit a utility pole and crash and explode, killing Simon and Katya. While they are celebrating their triumph, Carver persuades McClane to place another call to Holly.

== Cast ==
- Bruce Willis as NYPD Detective Lieutenant John McClane
- Jeremy Irons as Simon Peter Gruber
- Samuel L. Jackson as Zeus Carver
- Graham Greene as NYPD Detective Joe Lambert
- Colleen Camp as NYPD Detective Connie Kowalski
- Larry Bryggman as NYPD Inspector Walter Cobb
- Anthony Peck as NYPD Detective Ricky Walsh
- Nick Wyman as Mathias Targo
- Sam Phillips as Katya
- Stephen Pearlman as NYPD Psychologist Fred Schiller
- Kevin Chamberlin as NYPD Bomb Squad Expert Charlie Weiss
- Michael Cristofer as Bill Jarvis
- Richard Council as Otto
- Mischa Hausserman as Mischa
- Phyllis Yvonne Stickney as Wanda Shepard
- Phil Theis as Erik
- Sven Toorvald as Karl
- Robert Sedgwick as Rolf
- Timothy Adams as Gunther
- Tony Halme as Roman
- Aldis Hodge as Raymond Carver
- John Doman as Foreman
- Elvis Duran as Radio DJ

== Production ==
=== Development and writing ===
Like most of the films in the series, the premise of this film was repurposed from a stand-alone project. Various scripts were written for Die Hard 3; a number of them were ultimately rejected by Bruce Willis on the grounds that they felt like retreads of the action movies that came in the wake of the first film. One script, originally titled Troubleshooter, had McClane fighting terrorists on a Caribbean cruise line, but was rejected for being too similar to Under Siege. Troubleshooter was later repurposed for Speed 2: Cruise Control.

The script ultimately used was intended for a film entitled Simon Says, originally positioned as a Brandon Lee vehicle and the character of Zeus was written with an actress in mind, but the project was cancelled after Lee's death during filming of The Crow. Warner Bros. bought the script and rewrote it as a Lethal Weapon sequel. Warner Bros. later put the script in turnaround, only to be purchased by 20th Century Fox and rewritten as a Die Hard film.

Andy Vajna replaced Joel Silver and Larry Gordon as the producer on the film due to a fall-out with Willis. As a result, Vajna's company, Cinergi, acquired the international rights to the film. 20th Century Fox retained distribution rights in North America and Japan while Cinergi division Cinergi Productions handled international sales. The company pre-sold most rights to the Walt Disney Studios under their Buena Vista International unit while Summit Entertainment acted as the sales agent for the rest.

In July 1997, as part of their deal to sell their film library to Disney, Cinergi Pictures Entertainment announced that they had sold the international rights and their 50% ownership stake in the film to 20th Century Fox for $11.25 million.

=== Casting ===
Laurence Fishburne was originally offered the co-starring role of Zeus Carver, a part also written for him, but wanted a higher fee. Producer Andy Vajna held out on the deal. Fishburne had earlier turned down the role of Jules Winnfield in Pulp Fiction, which was eventually played by Samuel L. Jackson. Fishburne was talked out of playing Jules by his representatives who wanted him to only accept leading parts, otherwise he would be stuck career-wise as a supporting actor. Subsequently, Pulp Fiction premiered at the Cannes Film Festival during the same time as Fishburne's pay negotiations for the Zeus Carver role. Vajna also attended the event to support Willis who was appearing in the Quentin Tarantino film. Tarantino recalled that Vajna was so impressed by Jackson's performance that he offered him the part of Carver instead. Fishburne later filed a lawsuit against Vajna's company Cinergi for reneging on a verbal agreement. The lawsuit was settled before going to trial, with Fishburne receiving $750,000 and a guarantee that Cinergi would option a screenplay he had written.

=== Editing ===
McTiernan later revealed his planned original ending, which was not filmed:

The one I would have liked to do involved the suitcase bomb that's passed around for much of the film, circulating so much that they end up loading it onto the plane the bad guys are escaping on. While McClane and Zeus are floating there in the ocean, unharmed, it just flies by in the sky behind them with all the villains celebrating their escape. Then the suitcase reaches Simon, who opens it, the clock starts ticking, and he says, "Does anyone have a 4-gallon jug?" That was the ending I envisioned. Unfortunately, someone told Bruce that he had to be the absolute hero in the finale, so that whole idea got diluted.

== Music ==
Michael Kamen returned to score the third film, again incorporating other material into his score (most notably "When Johnny Comes Marching Home", not included on the soundtrack album). Excerpts from his scores for Die Hard and Die Hard 2 were also included in the new film. The soundtrack was released by RCA Victor. In 2012, La-La Land Records released an expanded version of the soundtrack, containing music that Kamen had composed but went unused in the final film.

== Release ==
=== Theatrical ===
Unlike its predecessors, Die Hard with a Vengeance did not take place during Christmas, but instead being set during the late summer. It opened in theaters on May 19, 1995, five years after Die Hard 2. Despite concerns about the film portraying bomb threats and terrorism with the Oklahoma City bombing having occurred the previous month, the film was released as originally scheduled.

=== Home media ===
Die Hard with a Vengeance was released on VHS on December 19, 1995, in the United States by Fox Video with a THX-certified version, while it was released in international countries by Touchstone Home Entertainment and released in South Africa on VHS by Ster-Kinekor Home Video. It was then released on LaserDisc on January 17, 1996, and on DVD on March 9, 1999. A special edition was released on DVD on July 10, 2001, and then re-released in February 2005 and 2007. The film was released on Blu-ray in 2007 and 2013. A 4K release of the film has been made available for digital purchase on services such Apple TV, Amazon Video, and the Microsoft Store, plus free 4K streaming on select platforms such as Disney+.

==== Alternative ending ====
An alternative ending to the one shown in the final movie was filmed with Jeremy Irons and Bruce Willis, set some time after the events in New York. It can be found on the Special Edition DVD. In this version, it is presumed that the robbery succeeds, and that McClane was used as the scapegoat for everything that went wrong. He is fired from the NYPD after more than 20 years on the force and the FBI has even taken away his pension; it is also mentioned that McClane and his wife Holly have divorced. Nevertheless, he still manages to track Simon using the batch number on the bottle of aspirins and they meet in a bar in Hungary. In this version, Simon has double-crossed most of his accomplices, gotten the loot to a safe hiding place somewhere in Hungary, and has the gold turned into statuettes of the Empire State Building in order to smuggle it out of the country. McClane is keen to take his problems out on Simon, whom he invites to play a game called "McClane Says". This involves a form of Russian roulette with a small Chinese rocket launcher that has had the sights removed, meaning it is impossible to determine which end is which. McClane then asks Simon some riddles similar to the ones he played in New York. When Simon gets a riddle wrong, McClane forces him at gunpoint to fire the launcher, which fires the rocket through Simon, killing him.

In the DVD audio commentary, screenwriter Jonathan Hensleigh claims that this version was dropped because the studio thought it showed a more cruel and menacing side to McClane, a man who killed for revenge rather than in self-defense. The studio was also displeased with the lack of action in the scene, feeling that it did not fit as a "climax" and therefore chose to reshoot the finale as an action sequence at a significant monetary cost. Hensleigh's intention was to show that the events in New York and the subsequent repercussions had tilted McClane psychologically. This alternative ending, set some time after the film's main events, would have marked a serious break from the Die Hard formula, in which the plot unfolds over a period of roughly 12 hours.

According to the DVD audio commentary, a second alternative ending had McClane and Carver floating back to shore on a makeshift raft after the explosion at sea. Carver says it is a shame the bad guys are going to get away; McClane tells him not to be so sure. The scene then shifts to the boat where the terrorists find the briefcase bomb they left in the park and which Carver gave back to them (in this version it was not used to blow up the dam). The film would end on a darkly comic note as Simon asks if anyone has a four-gallon jug. This draft of the script was rejected early on – possibly due to the similarity of the ending to Die Hard 2, where all the villains board a plane that later explodes – so it was never actually filmed. The rocket-launcher sequence was the only alternative ending to be filmed.

== Reception ==
=== Box office ===
Die Hard with a Vengeance opened in the United States on May 19, 1995, and earned $22,162,245 in its opening weekend. The film ranked number one at the box office, beating Crimson Tide. In Japan, it set a record opening for 20th Century Fox with a five-day gross of $13.5 million, beating Return of the Jedi and ranking number one for five consecutive weeks, grossing over $81 million. (Note: Attributed to multiple references:) Its opening in France set a summer record with a gross of $8.8 million in its first 8 days. The film went on to gross $100,012,499 in the United States and Canada, and $266,089,167 in other markets, giving it a total worldwide gross of $366,101,666 and making it the highest-grossing film of 1995.

=== Critical response ===
On Rotten Tomatoes, the film has an approval rating of 60% based on 80 reviews, with an average rating of 6.20/10. The site's critical consensus reads, "Die Hard with a Vengeance gets off to a fast start and benefits from Bruce Willis and Samuel L. Jackson's barbed interplay, but clatters to a bombastic finish in a vain effort to cover for an overall lack of fresh ideas." On Metacritic, the film has a score of 58 out of 100, based on 19 critics, indicating "mixed or average" reviews. Audiences polled by CinemaScore gave the film an average grade of "A−" on an A+ to F scale.

Roger Ebert of Chicago Sun-Times gave the film three stars out of four, praising the action sequences and the performances of Willis, Jackson, and Irons, concluding: "Die Hard with a Vengeance is basically a wind-up action toy, cleverly made, and delivered with high energy. It delivers just what it advertises, with a vengeance." Entertainment Weekly's Owen Gleiberman disliked the film, stating that while "[John] McTiernan stages individual sequences with great finesse... they don't add up to a taut, dread-ridden whole".

James Berardinelli thought that the explosions and fights were "filmed with consummate skill, and are thrilling in their own right". Samuel L. Jackson's performance in the film was also praised by critics. Desson Howe of The Washington Post thought that "the best thing about the movie is the relationship between McClane and Zeus," saying that Jackson was "almost as good as he was in Pulp Fiction." For Variety, Brian Lowry wrote the film was the "least accomplished" of the Die Hard series, but "even a subpar adventure won't kill this series, as the pic's built-in audience will make it a major summer attraction, if perhaps one lacking quite the stamina of the first two movies".

Empire magazine's Ian Nathan gave the film a three out of five stars review, stating that "Die Hard with a Vengeance is better than Die Hard 2, but not as good as the peerless original. Though it's breathless fun, the film runs out of steam in the last act. And Jeremy Irons' villain isn't fit to tie Alan Rickman's shoelaces."

In the Crime Time Filmbook, which archives various UK film reviews, the film was given a perfect 5-star review, citing it as "...simply the best Action film of the decade, leaving imitators like Bad Boys, Executive Decision, The Rock and Chain Reaction in varying depths of shadow.

Retrospective rankings have called the film the best sequel in the franchise. (Note: Attributed to multiple references:) Empire considered it to be one of the 50 greatest film sequels in 2009. Ben Sherlock of Screen Rant regarded it as the best sequel of the franchise. Johnny Hoffman from MovieWeb considered it a step up from the previous film and praised Willis and Jackson's chemistry and the action scenes.
