= Mario Kassar =

Lebanese and American film producer (born 1951)

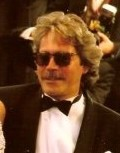
- Kassar at the 1992 Cannes Film Festival
- Born: October 10, 1951 (age 74); Beirut, Lebanon
- Occupations: Film producer; industry executive
- Spouse: Denise Richard
- Children: 3
- Website: www.mariokassar.com

Mario Kassar (Arabic: ماريو قصار; born October 10, 1951) is a Lebanese and American film producer and industry executive. He founded the now-defunct Carolco Pictures with Andrew G. Vajna where he produced the first three films of the Rambo series, Terminator 2: Judgment Day, Total Recall, The Doors, Angel Heart, Jacob's Ladder, Rambling Rose, Basic Instinct, Universal Soldier, Chaplin, Showgirls, and Stargate, among other films.

== Early life ==
Kassar was born on October 10, 1951, in Beirut, Lebanon. Like him, his father was also an independent movie producer. Kassar is of Lebanese and Italian descent.

By age 15, Kassar had purchased several Italian and French films for distribution in the Far East.

== Carolco Pictures ==
=== 1970s and Vajna ===
Kassar met Andrew G. Vajna at the 1975 Cannes Film Festival. A year later, Kassar and Vajna founded Carolco Pictures. "Carolco" was a name they had taken from a long-defunct company based in Panama. "We just bought the name," Kassar later told Entertainment Weekly. "It means nothing."

The first film Kassar and Vajna ventured together was The Sicilian Cross, a 1976 Italian film that starred Roger Moore. They bought the rights to the film for $130,000. Kassar flew to Asia and sold it for $220,000. By the early 1980s, Vajna and Kassar had bought a small office on Melrose Avenue where their desks faced each other and Vajna's wife and Kassar's girlfriend were their secretaries. Kassar and Vajna served as executive producers on The Changeling (1980), The Amateur (1981), and Escape to Victory (1981). The latter film marked the first time for both Kassar and Vajna to work with Sylvester Stallone.

=== 1980s and Rambo ===
In 1980, Kassar and Vajna paid Warner Bros. approximately $383,000 for the option rights of David Morrell's 1972 novel, First Blood. Even though they overpaid him, Kassar and Vajna cast Stallone as John Rambo because they knew the actor's star status could be used to secure the requisite investment. The result, First Blood, was a major hit in October 1982, and eventually made $125 million on its $14 million investment, making Carolco a major Hollywood production company. According to the Los Angeles Times, a Lebanese group associated with Kassar's family was instrumental in financing the film.

From the mid to late 1980s, Kassar executive produced two Rambo sequels: Rambo: First Blood Part II (1985) and Rambo III (1988), both of them also released by Carolco. Kassar also executive produced Angel Heart (1987) and Johnny Handsome (1989), as well as having produced Red Heat (1988).

"They knew the international distribution business so well," remembers Alan Parker, who directed Angel Heart for Carolco. "They figured out that 60 percent of the revenue of a film comes from outside the U.S. market. Andy and Mario personally knew all the worldwide local independent distributors."

In 1989, Vajna left Carolco and sold his interests to Kassar for approximately $100 million for his share in the company after their partnership had fallen apart that year upon disagreements over Carolco's direction. Kassar carried on with Peter Hoffman, who had been president/chief executive of Carolco since 1986. Hoffman had been introduced to Kassar by Tom Pollock, who would later become head of Universal Studios.

Also in 1989, at Kassar's urging, Hoffman purchased Dino De Laurentiis's defunct studio, De Laurentiis Entertainment Group, along with its headquarters in Wilmington, North Carolina following DEG's bankruptcy.

=== 1990s and Hoffman ===
Films that Kassar executive produced during the 1990s included Total Recall (1990), Air America (1990), Narrow Margin (1990), L.A. Story (1991), The Doors (1991), Terminator 2: Judgment Day (1991), Rambling Rose (1991), Basic Instinct (1992), Cliffhanger (1993), Stargate (1994), Last of the Dogmen (1995), Showgirls (1995) and Cutthroat Island (1995). Kassar also produced Universal Soldier (1992) and Chaplin (1992). During that time, relations between Kassar and Hoffman had degenerated into mistrust and antipathy. Hoffman thought Kassar's largesse was destroying the company; Kassar suspected Hoffman was scheming to depose him. A falling out with Kassar led to Hoffman's resignation in March 1992 with a $1.8 million settlement.

"They're extraordinary men, but they couldn't prevent confusion, conflict and disintegration," says Daniel Melnick, who produced Carolco's L.A. Story. "There were armed camps on both sides," recalls Melnick, who resigned from the Carolco board in April 1991.

Kassar paid $10 million to Arnold Schwarzenegger for him to star in Total Recall and $15 million to Michael Douglas for him to star in Basic Instinct. "(Kassar) was a big-time riverboat gambler," says Brian Grazer, who coproduced the $43 million The Doors with Kassar. Kassar went as far as even giving Schwarzenegger his own airplane, which cost an additional $17 million. Eventually, a Los Angeles judge froze $2.2 million of Kassar's shares and limited his access to company accounts.

Kassar attempted to produce the now shelved Bartholomew vs. Neff, a John Hughes film which would have starred Stallone and John Candy.

Carolco lost about $47 million on Cutthroat Island and went into bankruptcy in November 1995, six weeks before the film was released to theatres. Nevertheless, Kassar received his $1 million fee.

== Post-bankruptcy ==
=== Paramount and Lolita ===
In the wake of Carolco's collapse, Kassar shifted his employment to Paramount Pictures and started Mario Kassar Productions. Sherry Lansing, chairman of Paramount, said: "I am thrilled that Mario will be making his new home at Paramount. Mario excels at producing major action-adventure films with high level directors and cast that have worldwide appeal. He also brings creative financial arrangements to the films he makes. We all look forward to our new relationship with him and the exciting projects he will bring to the studio."

Mario Kassar said: "I have the highest regard for Sherry Lansing and the rest of the Paramount team. Jon Dolgen and I have had a great working relationship for years. Since I've always worked outside the studio system, I am very happy to begin my post-Carolco career with a studio as flexible, dynamic and creative as Paramount. I can't wait to make films in such an environment."

Kassar also executive produced Lolita (1997), which was directed by Adrian Lyne and starred Jeremy Irons, Melanie Griffith and Dominique Swain.

=== C2 Pictures and Magnetik Media ===
In 1998, he reunited with Vajna again and together they founded C2 Pictures, which produced I Spy (2002), Terminator 3: Rise of the Machines (2003) and Basic Instinct 2 (2006). Kassar later confirmed on March 11, 2009, that as a result of the latter movie being a failure at the box office, plans for a third chapter were shelved and C2 Pictures officially ended the Basic Instinct/Catherine Tramell franchise. C2 Pictures was later disbanded afterwards and it was later revealed that Vajna and Kassar founded the company only for the purpose of reviving the Terminator franchise.

Kassar also co-founded Magnetik Media with Erick J. Feitshans and it was announced on May 15, 2007, that Magnetik Media signed 3:10 to Yuma (2007) and The Forbidden Kingdom (2008) from Ryan Kavanaugh's studio, Relativity Media.

=== Late 2000s ===
According to Today's Zaman, it was announced on August 7, 2008, that Kassar was reportedly collaborating with the Turkish Radio and Television Corporation on a miniseries that would recount the life of Suleiman the Magnificent.

It was reported that Kassar also participated on Terminator Salvation (2009). However, it was later revealed that he and Vajna sold the franchise to Derek Anderson and Victor Kubicek of the Halcyon Group in 2007. Kassar received $30 million for the purchase.

=== Audition and Brick Top ===
The Hollywood Reporter announced on October 4, 2012, that Kassar was backing Schuyler Moore, who is helping raise $100 million for the Singapore-based Infiniti Media Fund.

In June 2014, it was reported that Kassar will be producing an English language remake of Takashi Miike's 1999 film, Audition, which is based on the 1997 novel of the same name by Ryū Murakami. Kassar's remake will be set in the United States and will be written and directed by Richard Gray.

On November 24, 2014, Brick Top Productions had entered into an Executive Services Agreement with Kassar. Alexander Bafer, Brick Top's CEO said, "There is no human being on this planet better than Mario Kassar at making true Hollywood blockbusters. I am honored with this opportunity to work with him."

== Carolco relaunch ==
On January 20, 2015, it was announced that Carolco Pictures was back when Brick Top acquired its name. Brick Top Productions officially changed its corporate name to Carolco Pictures Inc.

On February 17, 2015, it was announced that Kassar had returned as chairman of the board of directors of the currently relaunched Carolco Pictures. "One of my greatest joys in life was being the chairman of Carolco Pictures ... I am elated to return to that position, to produce the world's greatest movies once again under the Carolco brand for my fans and people everywhere to enjoy," Kassar said.

"The major difference between now and then are the advances in technology and cinematography not previously available to Carolco Pictures 20 years ago," Kassar said. "Combined with these advances ... the best movies I will ever produce are still yet to come." Alex Bafer, now Carolco Pictures’ CEO, said Kassar "is hands-down the world's greatest producer of mega-hit films. We couldn't be more excited than to have Mario return as the chairman of the board. Our goal now is to not only restore the Carolco brand back to its rightful place in Hollywood, but also to build an entirely new library of memorable films for today's generation."

In November 2017, the new Carolco was renamed Recall Studios.

== Personal life ==
Kassar resides in Holmby Hills with his wife Denise Richard-Kassar and their three daughters, Natasha, Tatiana and Anastasia. . ln 2026, he collaborates with Iacono Entertainment Holding LLP.

== Filmography ==
Executive producer

- The Changeling (1980)
- The Amateur (1981)
- Superstition (1982)
- First Blood (1982)
- Rambo: First Blood Part II (1985)
- Angel Heart (1987)
- Extreme Prejudice (1987)
- Rambo III (1988)
- Red Heat (1988)
- DeepStar Six (1989)
- Johnny Handsome (1989)
- Mountains of the Moon (1990)
- Total Recall (1990)
- Air America (1990)
- Repossessed (1990)
- Narrow Margin (1990)
- Jacob's Ladder (1990)
- L.A. Story (1991)
- The Doors (1991)
- Terminator 2: Judgment Day (1991)
- Rambling Rose (1991)
- Light Sleeper (1992)
- Basic Instinct (1992)
- Universal Soldier (1992)
- Cliffhanger (1993)
- Heaven & Earth (1993)
- Stargate (1994)
- Last of the Dogmen (1995)
- Showgirls (1995)
- Cutthroat Island (1995)
- Terminator: The Sarah Connor Chronicles (2008–09)
- Terminator Salvation (2009)
- Foxtrot Six (2019)

Producer

- Chaplin (1992)
- Lolita (1997)
- I Spy (2002)
- Terminator 3: Rise of the Machines (2003)
- Basic Instinct 2 (2006)
- Z (2019)
- The Z Team (TBA)

Writer

- Habibie & Ainun 3 (2019)

Actor

- Your Ticket Is No Longer Valid (1981)

Presenter

- The Silent Partner (1978)
- The Changeling (1980)
- Your Ticket Is No Longer Valid (1981)
- Superstition (1982)
- First Blood (1982)
- Rambo: First Blood Part II (1985)
- Extreme Prejudice (1987)
- Red Heat (1988)
- DeepStar Six (1989)
- Johnny Handsome (1989)
- Total Recall (1990)
- Air America (1990)
- Narrow Margin (1990)
- L.A. Story (1991)
- The Doors (1991)
- Terminator 2: Judgment Day (1991)
- Light Sleeper (1992)
- Basic Instinct (1992)
- Universal Soldier (1992)
- Chaplin (1992)
- Cliffhanger (1993)
- Last of the Dogmen (1995)
- Cutthroat Island (1995)
- Lolita (1997)

Thanks

- Hamlet (1990)
- The Directors (2007) (Documentary)
- Showgirls 2: Penny's from Heaven (2011) (Direct-to-video)
