= Hearst Entertainment Productions =

American television production company

- Formerly: The Jozak Company (1973–1985); Phoenix Entertainment Group (1985–1989); King Phoenix Entertainment (1989–1990)
- Type: Subsidiary
- Industry: Television distribution Television production
- Founded: February 1973; 53 years ago
- Founder: Gerald Isenberg
- Defunct: 2003
- Headquarters: Los Angeles, California, United States
- Owner: Hearst Corporation (1989–2003)

Hearst Entertainment Productions (formerly The Jozak Company, Phoenix Entertainment Group and King Phoenix Entertainment) is an American television production company that was formed by Gerald Isenberg in 1973.

The company was sold to Hearst Corporation in 1989.

== History ==
=== The Jozak Company ===
In 1973, Gerald I. Isenberg, formerly of ABC Movie of the Week and Metromedia Producers Corporation, had formed an independent television production company, The Jozak Company, which was based in Los Angeles, California. The company formally set up operations in September 1974, which was based at CBS Studio Center.

Around the same time, as the company is about to set up operations, in October 1974, Isenberg hired freelance producer Gerald W. Abrams, who was in charge of the company as vice president of creative affairs for the company.

In 1976, Jozak Company had two triumphs, one in June for finishing production on the made-for-TV movie Having Babies, and the other for another made-for-TV movie on GE Theater, The Secret Life of John Chapman, in November.

Also in 1976, The Jozak Company had signed a deal with Paramount Pictures to develop film and television projects for the studio. Around the same time, the company was intended to be executive producer on Star Trek: Planet of the Titans, an unmade feature film that was set to be produced by Paramount Pictures. Around the time, The Jozak Company begin work with Casablanca Records & Filmworks for a miniseries, Attack on the Lusitania, which was slated for 1977, but it was scrapped.

In 1977, the company produced the made-for-TV movie Red Alert, with Paramount Television, based on the novel Paradigm Red by Harold King, starring William Devane. The company also developed The Relentless for CBS. Also that year, the company had acquired the screenplay for Last Days, set in the Saigon War, for Paramount Pictures. In 1977, the company produced its television version of Hollywood High for NBC. Also that year, the company had bought the rights to Flesh & Blood with Paramount Television for CBS.

In late 1977, the company had adapted the Having Babies television movies into a weekly television series for ABC, for 1978 premiere. In the following year, Jozak had produced a TV movie Letters from Frank for CBS, starring Art Carney.

In 1978, Gerald W. Abrams left The Jozak Company to form its new independent production company, Cypress Point Productions, which was at Paramount Television, citing Isenberg's desire to focus on motion pictures. In 1979, the company had a deal with Procter & Gamble to finance the television movie Seizure on CBS.

In 1980, Isenberg decided to move his focus onto directing. In 1980, the company signed an exclusive deal with MGM Television, and developed a television adaptation of Fame for NBC.

In November 1982, the company granted funding by Richard Cohen through the millionaire company GIT to form its unit, Jozak/Decade Productions (or I & C Productions, for Gerard Isenberg and Richard Cohen), which was mainly used for production of television and theatrical movies through funds from Cohen himself.

=== Phoenix Entertainment Group/King Phoenix Entertainment ===
In May 1985, the company merged with Cypress Point Productions, a company owned by Gerald W. Abrams to form an independent production firm, Phoenix Entertainment Group, still backed by financial backer Richard Cohen, under the name ACI Production Services (which is short for its last names Abrams, Cohen and Isenberg).

In 1986, Phoenix Entertainment Group hired The Silverbach-Lazarus Group to represent its services internationally and launched Phoenix Entertainment Distribution to handle international sales of its television movies. Also that year, New World International and Phoenix Entertainment Group signed a worldwide television deal where New World handled distribution of its product by Phoenix Entertainment Group.

In 1986, the company decided to sell the Walker family story to CBS. Additionally, Phoenix bought the rights to a set of unspecified novels. Around the time, the company made its big break with Brotherhood of Justice on ABC.

Around 1987, the company was one of the major members of the King Features Entertainment-affiliated The Movie Alliance, alongside other producers, such as Steve Tisch, Jon Avnet, Robert Greenwald, Leonard Hill and Frank von Zerneck.

In 1988, the company produced the television movie The Finish Line for Turner Network Television. In December 1988, Harry Chandler joined Phoenix Entertainment Group as vice president of specials for movies and international co-production. The company then followed it up with the hit miniseries The Women of Brewster Place for ABC.

In February 1989, Phoenix Entertainment Group was acquired by The Hearst Corporation, who owned television syndicator King Features Entertainment, and initially renamed King Phoenix Entertainment, which was named after King Features Syndicate.

In August 1989, Chad Hoffman had signed a deal with King Phoenix Entertainment to develop all content for the company. By 1990, the company was an early supplier of original movies for Lifetime.

=== Hearst Entertainment Productions ===
In mid-1989, Hearst Corporation started consolidating production, syndication and cable properties, with King Features Entertainment and King Phoenix Entertainment being merged to form a new division, the Hearst Entertainment and Syndication Group, transferring from the King Features Syndicate unit. As a result, on April 14, 1990, King Features Entertainment was renamed to Hearst Entertainment, or Hearst Entertainment Distribution (HED), while King Phoenix Entertainment was renamed to Hearst Entertainment Productions (HEP).

Also that year, Freyda Rothstein, formerly of New World Television, had inked a first-look deal with the studio. Also in 1990, Judith Polone had left Hearst Entertainment Productions to start out a new company, The Polone Company, with a deal at the studio. Polone then exited Hearst in 1993, leaving Polone to form the company solo.

In 1991, the company branched out to original series for Lifetime by producing the drama Veronica Clare, but didn't last long.

In December 1994, founder and president Gerald I. Isenberg exited Hearst Entertainment Productions. In 1995, Donald Wyre, who was under Polongo Pictures, had left Hearst Entertainment to form a new company, Spygaze Pictures. In 1996, Gerald W. Abrams had left to form a new company, Evolve Entertainment, with Jennifer Alward of Morgan Hill Films.

In 1998, the company signed a cable pack with the IATSE to supply its product for 3 years. In 1999, the company had partnered with Endemol Entertainment to finance the Castro romance picture Assassin. In 2000, the company had signed a deal with Cheyenne Enterprises to produce a series of television movies.

In 2002, the company had ended its pact with Lifetime.

== Programs ==
=== Television movies/pilots/specials ===
==== The Jozak Company ====
Title	Air date	Network	Notes
The Last Angry Man	April 16, 1974	ABC	co-production with Screen Gems
It Couldn't Happen to a Nicer Guy	November 19, 1974	ABC	
Winner Take All	March 3, 1975	NBC	
Katherine	October 5, 1975	ABC	
James Dean	February 19, 1976	NBC	
Having Babies	October 17, 1976	ABC	
The Secret Life of John Chapman	December 27, 1976	CBS	
Secrets	February 20, 1977	ABC	co-production with Paramount Television
Red Alert	May 18, 1977	CBS	co-production with Paramount Television
Having Babies II	October 28, 1977	ABC	co-production with Paramount Television
The Defection of Simas Kudirka	January 23, 1978	CBS	co-production with Paramount Television
Having Babies III	March 3, 1978	ABC	co-production with Paramount Television
Ski Lift to Death	March 3, 1978	CBS	co-production with Paramount Television
With This Ring	May 5, 1978	ABC	co-production with Paramount Television
Murder at the Mardi Gras	May 10, 1978	CBS	co-production with Paramount Television
Steeletown	May 19, 1979	CBS	co-production with Cypress Point Productions and Paramount Television
Flesh and Blood	October 14, 1979	CBS	co-production with Cypress Point Productions and Paramount Television
Letters from Frank	November 22, 1979	CBS	co-production with Cypress Point Productions and Paramount Television
The Gift	December 15, 1979	CBS	co-production with Cypress Point Productions and Paramount Television
Seizure: The Story of Kathy Morris	January 9, 1980	CBS	
When She Says No	January 30, 1984	ABC	as I & C Productions
The Three Wishes of Billy Grier	November 1, 1984	ABC	as I & C Productions
Forbidden	March 24, 1985	HBO	as Jozak/Decade Productions; with Mark Forstarer Productions Ltd., Clasart Film-und Fernsehproduktion, Anthea Film and Stella Film
When Dreams Come True	May 28, 1985	ABC	as I & C Productions; with Telepictures Productions
The Execution of Raymond Graham	November 17, 1985	ABC	co-production with Alliance Entertainment Corporation and David W. Rintels

==== Phoenix Entertainment Group/King Phoenix Entertainment ====
Title	Air date	Network	Notes
A Time to Triumph	January 7, 1986	CBS	co-production with Billos/Kauffman Productions
Child's Cry	February 9, 1986	CBS	co-production with Shoot the Moon Enterprises
Thompson's Last Run	February 16, 1986	CBS	co-production with Cypress Point Productions
Brotherhood of Justice	May 18, 1986	ABC	co-production with The Guber-Peters Company, Margot Winchester Productions and Taper Media Enterprises
Hardesty House	July 5, 1986	ABC	co-production with Robert Ginty Productions and ABC Circle Films
Doing Life	September 23, 1986	NBC	co-production with Alliance Entertainment and Castilian Productions
Tonight's the Night	February 2, 1987	ABC	co-production with The IndieProd Company
Code Name: Dancer	April 12, 1987	ABC	co-production with The Steve Tisch Company
Bay Coven	October 25, 1987	NBC	co-production with The Guber-Peters Company and Jerlor Productions
A Hobo's Christmas	December 6, 1987	CBS	co-production with Joe Byrne/Falrose Productions
Evil in Clear River	January 11, 1988	ABC	co-production with The Steve Tisch Company
A Father's Revenge	January 24, 1988	ABC	co-production with Rosco Film GmbH
God Bless the Child	March 21, 1988	ABC	co-production with Alliance Entertainment and The IndieProd Company
Whisper Kill	May 16, 1988	ABC	co-production with The Steve Tisch Company and Sandyhook Productions
Nightmare at Bittercreek	May 24, 1988	CBS	co-production with Swanton Films and The Guber-Peters Company
Circus	August 3, 1988	ABC	
Gotham	August 21, 1988	Showtime	co-production with Keith Addis & Associates and Cannon Films
Street of Dreams	October 7, 1988	CBS	
Goddess of Love	November 20, 1988	NBC	co-production with Phil Margo Productinos and New World Television
Finish Line	January 11, 1989	TNT	co-production with The Guber-Peters Company
Get Smart, Again!	February 26, 1989	ABC	co-production with The IndieProd Company
Naked Lie	February 26, 1989	CBS	co-production with Shadowplay Films and Victoria Principal Productions
Out on the Edge	May 14, 1989	CBS	co-production with Rick Dawn Productions and The Steve Tisch Company
Chain Letter	August 5, 1989	ABC	co-production with The IndieProd Company and New World Television
Blind Witness	November 26, 1989	ABC	co-production with Shadowplay Films
Jekyll & Hyde	January 21, 1990	ABC	co-production with David Wickes TV and London Weekend Television
Daughter of Darkness	January 26, 1990	CBS	co-production with Accent Entertainment Corporation
Challenger	February 25, 1990	ABC	co-production with George Englund Productions and The IndieProd Company
Sparks: The Price of Passion	February 25, 1990	CBS	co-production with Shadowplay Productions and Victoria Principal Productions
Stolen: One Husband	February 27, 1990	CBS	
A Killing in a Small Town	May 22, 1990	CBS	co-production with The IndieProd Company
The Ghost Writer	August 15, 1990	Fox	co-production with Alan Spencer Productions, The IndieProd Company and New World Television

==== Hearst Entertainment Productions ====
Title	Air date	Network	Notes
Sudie and Simpson	September 11, 1990	Lifetime	co-production with Donald March Productions and Freed/Laufer Productions
Babies	September 17, 1990	NBC	co-production with The IndieProd Company
The World's Oldest Living Bridesmaid	September 21, 1990	CBS	co-production with Accent Entertainment Corporation and Donna Mills Productions
Storm and Sorrow	November 22, 1990	Lifetime	co-production with Accent Entertainment Corporation and Shadowplay Films
The Fatal Image	December 2, 1990	CBS	co-production with Ellipse Programme
Lucky Day	March 11, 1991	ABC	co-production with Polongo Pictures
The Killing Mind	April 23, 1991	Lifetime	
Runaway Father	September 22, 1991	CBS	co-production with Bonaparte Productions, Lee Levinson Productions and The Polone Company
Stranger in the Family	October 27, 1991	ABC	co-production with Polongo Pictures
Wildflower	December 3, 1991	Lifetime	co-production with Carroll Newman Productions, Freed/Laufer Productions and The Polone Company
Maid for Each Other	January 13, 1992	NBC	co-production with Alexander/Enright & Associates
Grave Secrets: The Legacy of Hilltop Drive	March 3, 1992	CBS	co-production with Fredya Rothstein Productions
Harley-Davison: The American Motorcycle	March 13, 1992	TBS	
Seduction: Three Tales from the 'Inner Sanctum'	April 5, 1992	ABC	co-production with Caroll Newman Productions, Victoria Principal Productions and The Polone Company
In the Eyes of a Stranger	April 7, 1992	CBS	co-production with Avenue Pictures
Ned Blessing: The True Story of Life	April 14, 1992	CBS	co-production with Wittliff/Pangaea
Midnight's Child	April 21, 1992	Lifetime	co-production with The Polone Company, Jeff Myro-David Gottlieb Productions and Victoria Principal Productions
Baby Snatcher	May 3, 1992	CBS	co-production with Morgan Hill Films
Getting Up and Going Home	July 21, 1992	Lifetime	co-production with Caroll Newman Productions and The Polone Company
Exclusive	October 4, 1992	ABC	co-production with Freyda Rothstein Productions and Hamel-Somers Entertainment
The Good Fight	December 15, 1992	Lifetime	co-production with Freyda Rothstein Productions
Mrs. 'Arris Goes to Paris	December 27, 1992	CBS	co-production with Accent Productions and Bonneville Producers Group
Bonds of Love	January 24, 1993	CBS	co-production with RAI
Poisoned by Love: The Kern County Murders	February 2, 1993	CBS	co-production with Morgan Hill Films
Darkness Before Dawn	February 15, 1993	NBC	co-production with Diana Kerew Productions
Lies & Lullabies	March 14, 1993	ABC	co-production with Alexander/Enright & Associates, Susan Dey Productions and Harvey Kahn Productions
Prophet of Evil: The Ervil LeBaron Story	May 4, 1993	CBS	co-production with Dream City Films
Visions of Murder	May 7, 1993	NBC	co-production with Bar-Gene Productions and Freyda Rothstein Productions
Night Owl	August 19, 1993	Lifetime	co-production with Morgan Hill Films
Ghost Mom	November 1, 1993	Fox	co-production with Power Pictures and Richard Crystal Company
Murder of Innocence	November 30, 1993	CBS	co-production with Carroll Newman Productions, The Samuels Film Co. and The Polone Company
A Kiss to Die For	December 6, 1993	NBC	co-production with The Polone Company
Hush Little Baby	January 6, 1994	USA Network	co-production with Astral Film Enterprises and Power Pictures
Silent Witness: What a Child Saw	February 17, 1994	USA Network	co-production with Power Pictures and The Movie Network
And Then There Was One	March 9, 1994	Lifetime	co-production with Freyda Rothstein Productions
Eyes of Terror	March 18, 1994	NBC	co-production with Bar-Gene Productions and Freyda Rothstein Productions
Ultimate Betrayal	March 20, 1994	CBS	co-production with Polongo Pictures and Power Pictures
David's Mother	April 10, 1994	CBS	co-production with Morgan Hill Films
Ride with the Wind	April 18, 1994	ABC	co-production with Family Tree Productions and Peter Frankovich Productions
Web of Deception	April 25, 1994	NBC	co-production with Morgan Hill Films
Guinevere	May 7, 1994	Lifetime	co-production with Lietuvos Kinostudija, Alexander/Enright & Associates and Weintraub/Kuhn Productions
My Breast	May 15, 1994	CBS	co-production with Diana Kerew Productions and The Polone Company
Untamed Love	August 3, 1994	Lifetime	co-production with Cathy Lee Crosby Productions and Carroll Newman Productions
Arly Hanks	August 20, 1994	CBS	co-production with CBS Entertainment Productions
See Jane Run	January 8, 1995	ABC	co-production with Avenue Pictures
Choices of the Heart: The Margaret Sanger Story	March 8, 1995	Lifetime	co-production with Morgan Hill Films and Power Pictures
Ed McBain's 87th Precinct: Lightning	March 19, 1995	NBC	co-production with Diana Kerew Productions
Betrayed: A Story of Three Women	March 19, 1995	ABC	co-production with Freyda Rothstein Productions
A Stranger in Town	March 29, 1995	CBS	co-production with Avenue Pictures
Dancing in the Dark	July 5, 1995	Lifetime	co-production with Dream City Films
Kansas	July 27, 1995	ABC	co-production with ABC Productions and Empty Chair Productions
The Unspoken Truth	September 24, 1995	NBC	co-production with Peter Frankovich Productions
Trail of Tears	October 9, 1995	NBC	co-production with Polongo Pictures
Terror in the Shadows	October 16, 1995	NBC	co-production with Freyda Rothstein Productions and Lois Luger Productions
The Babysitter's Seduction	January 22, 1996	NBC	co-production with Richard Maynard Productions
No One Could Protect Her	February 11, 1996	ABC	co-production with Freyda Rothstein Productions and Power Pictures
Ed McBain's 87th Precinct: Ice	February 18, 1996	NBC	co-production with Diana Kerew Productions
Closer and Closer	February 18, 1996	Lifetime	co-production with Freyda Rothstein Productions and Power Pictures
Hidden in Silence	March 6, 1996	Lifetime	co-production with Stillking Productions, The Colla Company and ZDF Enterprises
The Haunting of Lisa	April 10, 1996	Lifetime	co-production with PhiliPiCo Company and Power Pictures
All She Ever Wanted	April 14, 1996	ABC	co-production with Carroll Newman Productions
Hostile Advances: The Kerry Ellison Story	May 27, 1996	Lifetime	co-production with Diana Kerew Productions and Power Pictures
The Abduction	July 7, 1996	Lifetime	co-production with Benjamin Productions and Power Pictures
Her Desperate Choice	October 6, 1996	Lifetime	co-production with Carroll Newman Productions
The Care and Handling of Roses	October 8, 1996	CBS	co-production with C.M. Two Productions
A Kiss So Deadly	October 14, 1996	NBC	co-production with Morgan Hill Films
Color Me Perfect	November 5, 1996	Lifetime	co-production with Power Pictures and Michele Lee Productions
Inheritance Up Christmas	December 9, 1996	Lifetime	co-production with Carroll Newman Productions
Lying Eyes	December 9, 1996	NBC	co-production with C.M. Two Productions
Ed McBain's 87th Precinct: Heatwave	January 12, 1997	NBC	co-production with Diana Kerew Productions
When the Cradle Falls	March 4, 1997	CBS	co-production with Freyda Rothstein Productions
Prison of Secrets	March 16, 1997	Lifetime	co-production with Carroll Newman Productions
When Innocence is Lost	April 7, 1997	Lifetime	co-production with Diana Kerew Productions
Two Small Voices	June 16, 1997	Lifetime	co-production with Freyda Rothstein Productions
High Stakes	July 7, 1997	Lifetime	co-production with Spygaze Pictures
Time to Say Goodbye	September 1, 1997	Lifetime	co-production with Schreckinger Communications Company
Every 9 Seconds	October 12, 1997	NBC	co-production with Freyda Rothstein Productions and Jean Abounader Productions
The Hired Heart	October 13, 1997	Lifetime	co-production with PhiliPiCo Company
Fifteen and Pregnant	January 19, 1998	Lifetime	co-production with Diana Kerew Productions
When Husbands Cheat	February 2, 1998	Lifetime	co-production with Brayton-Carlucci Productions
Final Justice	June 1, 1998	Lifetime	co-production with Gleneagle Productions
A Change of Heart	July 19, 1998	Lifetime	co-production with Freyda Rothstein Productions
A Chance of Snow	December 7, 1998	Lifetime	co-production with Orly Anderson Productions and The Auerbach Company
Hit and Run	January 11, 1999	Lifetime	co-production with C.M. Two Productions
Love is Strange	February 8, 1999	Lifetime	co-production with Noon Attack Productions
Invisible Child	March 8, 1999	Lifetime	co-production with Gross-Weston Productions
Dangerous Evidence: The Lori Jackson Story	April 12, 1999	Lifetime	co-production with Brayton-Carlucci Productions and Hennessey Entertainment
Down Will Come Baby	May 4, 1999	CBS	co-production with Paulette Breen Productions
Jackie's Back!	June 14, 1999	Lifetime	co-production with Krost/Chapin Productions
Take My Advice: The Ann and Abby Story	July 19, 1999	Lifetime	co-production with Freyda Rothstein Productions
The Almost Perfect Bank Robbery	July 21, 1999	CBS	co-production with Avenue Pictures
Passion's Way	July 25, 1999	CBS	co-production with Freyda Rothstein Productions and ZDF
The Price of a Broken Heart	August 16, 1999	Lifetime	co-production with Cairo/Simpson Entertainment and Once Upon a Time Films
Where the Truth Lies	September 13, 1999	Lifetime	co-production with Greentree Films and Solo One Productions
My Little Assassin	October 11, 1999	Lifetime	co-production with Gleneagle Productions and Endemol Entertainment
The Soul Collector	October 24, 1999	CBS	co-production with Brayton-Carlucci Productions
Blue Valley Songbird	November 1, 1999	Lifetime	co-production with Freyda Rothstein Productions and Dolly Parton Southern Light Productions
If You Believe	December 6, 1999	Lifetime	co-production with Spring Creek Productions
Sublet	December 21, 1999	Cinemax	co-production with Allegro Films and Krasko Productions
Navigating the Heart	February 14, 2000	Lifetime	co-production with Front Street Pictures, Lee Rose Pictures, Pacific Motion Pictures and Canal+
Another Woman's Husband	March 6, 2000	Lifetime	co-production with C.M. Two Productions
Sex & Mrs. X	April 10, 2000	Lifetime	co-production with Brayton-Carlucci Productions
My Mother, the Spy	May 8, 2000	Lifetime	
Trial by Media	June 5, 2000	Lifetime	co-production with Gleneagle Productions
The Deadly Lock of Love	July 10, 2000	Lifetime	co-production with C.M. Two Productions
Out of Sync	July 12, 2000	VH1	co-production with TVA International
The Truth About Jane	August 7, 2000	Lifetime	co-production with Orly Anderson Productions
Custody of the Heart	August 28, 2000	Lifetime	co-production with Daniel L. Paulson Productions
When Andrew Came Home	October 30, 2000	Lifetime	co-production with Michael Filerman Productions
Santa Who?	November 19, 2000	ABC	co-production with Gleneagle Productions
Range of Motion	December 4, 2000	Lifetime	co-production with Craig Anderson Productions
A Mother's Flight for Justice	February 12, 2001	Lifetime	co-production with Morgan Hill Films
The Familiar Stranger	March 12, 2001	Lifetime	co-production with Andrea Baynes Productions
Sex, Lies & Obsession	May 7, 2001	Lifetime	co-production with Cairo/Simpson Entertainment
Snap Decision	June 4, 2001	Lifetime	co-production with Freyda Rothstein Productions
Dangerous Child	July 16, 2001	Lifetime	co-production with Freyda Rothstein Productions
Just Ask My Children	September 10, 2001	Lifetime	co-production with Firebrand Productions
Taking Back Our Town	December 10, 2001	Lifetime	co-production with Schreckinger Communications Company
The Rendering	January 15, 2002	Lifetime	co-production with Incendo Media, De Angelis Film Production, JB Media and Victory 17 Production
Video Voyeur: The Susan Wilson Story	January 21, 2002	Lifetime	co-production with Blue André Productions and Wilson Story Productions
Her Best Friend's Husband	March 11, 2002	Lifetime	co-production with Jean Abounader Productions
Guilt by Association	March 13, 2002	Court TV	co-production with Incendo Media and JB Media
Crossing the Line	July 15, 2002	Lifetime	co-production with BEI Losing It Productions, MEDEACOM Productions and Robert Kline Productions
The Pact	November 4, 2002	Lifetime	co-production with Randwell Productions
The Interrogation of Michael Crowe	December 4, 2002	Court TV	co-production with Incento Media and JB Media
A Long Way Home	January 10, 2003	Lifetime	co-production with DeAngelis Film Production, Victory 18. Film Production, Jean Abounader Productions and The Donna Kanter Company
View of Terror	February 20, 2003	Lifetime	co-production with Incendo Media and JB Media
Wicked Minds	March 1, 2003	Lifetime	co-production with Incendo Media, JB Media, Movie Central, Super Ecran and The Movie Network
Nightwaves	April 2003	WGN America	co-production with Incendo Media and JB Media
Deadly Betrayal	June 23, 2003	Lifetime	co-production with Incendo Media and JB Media
Wall of Secrets	August 2003	Lifetime	co-production with Incendo Media and JB Media
Deception	2003	Lifetime	co-production with Incendo Media and JB Media

=== Television series/miniseries ===
==== The Jozak Company ====
Title	Years	Network	Notes
Hollywood High	1977	NBC	co-production with Paramount Television
Julie Farr, M.D.	1978-1979	ABC	co-production with Paramount Television
Fame	1982-1987	NBC/Syndication	season 1 only; co-production with Eileena Productions and MGM Television

==== Phoenix Entertainment Group/King Phoenix Entertainment ====
Title	Years	Network	Notes
Monte Carlo	1986	CBS	miniseries; co-production with Collins-Holm Productions, Highgate Pictures and New World Television
Roses Are for the Rich	1987	CBS	miniseries; co-production with Karen Mack Productions and Robert A. Papazian Productions
Mariah	1987	ABC	co-production with Alliance Entertainment, The Vista Organization and New World Television
A Fine Romance	1989	ABC	co-production with The IndieProd Company, London Weekend Television, TF1 and Westwood Atrium
From the Dead of Night	1989	NBC	miniseries; co-production with Shadowplay Films
The Women of Brewster Place	1989	ABC	miniseries; co-production with Harpo Productions
Family of Spies	1990	CBS	

==== Hearst Entertainment Productions ====
Title	Years	Network	Notes
Brewster Place	1990	ABC	co-production with Amanda Productions, The Don Sipes Organization, and Harpo Productions
Veronica Clare	1991	Lifetime	
Eerie, Indiana	1991–92	NBC	co-production with Unreality, Inc. and Cosgrove/Meurer Productions
The Legend of Prince Valiant	1991–93	The Family Channel	co-production with I.D.D.H. and Polyphon Film-und Fernsehgesellschaft
What Happened?	1992–93	NBC	
Family Pictures	1993	ABC	miniseries; co-production with Alexander/Enright & Associates
J.F.K.: Reckless Youth	1993	ABC	miniseries; co-production with The Polone Company and The Kushner-Locke Company
Ned Blessing: The Story of My Life and Times	1993	CBS	co-production with Whitliff/Pangaea Productions and CBS Entertainment Productions
Eerie, Indiana: The Other Dimension	1998	Fox Kids	

=== Movies ===
Title	Release date	Distributor	Notes
The Clan of the Cave Bear	January 17, 1986	Warner Bros. Pictures	co-production with Producers Sales Organization and The Guber-Peters Company
Hearts of Fire	October 9, 1987	Lorimar Motion Pictures	
Prince Valiant	July 21, 1998	20th Century Fox Home Entertainment	co-production with Constantin Film, Babelsberg Film, Celtridge and Legacy Film Productions
Blind Terror	April 23, 2001	DEJ Productions	co-production with Lantern Lane Productions and TVA International
