= The Guber-Peters Entertainment Company =

American film and television production company

- Type: Public
- Industry: Film; Television
- Founded: 1982; 44 years ago
- Founder: Jon Peters; Peter Guber
- Defunct: 1991; 35 years ago
- Successor: Sony Pictures Entertainment
- Headquarters: Burbank, California
- Parent: Columbia Pictures Entertainment (1989–1991)
- Divisions: Guber-Peters Video; Guber-Peters Television

The Guber-Peters Entertainment Company was a film and television production company formed by Peter Guber and Jon Peters in 1982 when they left PolyGram Pictures. It is best known for Rain Man, The Color Purple and Batman, among others. The company was sold to Columbia Pictures Entertainment in 1989 when Sony Corporation of America bought out the studio, and it was dissolved as its production entity in 1991.

== History ==
In 1982, Jon Peters and Peter Guber decided to sell their stakes in their production company PolyGram Pictures following a series of flops. Therefore they launched its own independent company at Warner Bros., while continuing their relationship with Universal Pictures, but its relationship with Universal never lasted long. One of their first projects were Six Weeks and D.C. Cab, two of the projects initially started under PolyGram's contract with Universal via the producers. Like their tenure at PolyGram Pictures, many of the company's films had flopped at the box office.

In 1984, the company launched their television unit, sometimes called Guber-Peters Video. Many of their productions was in partnership with Centerpoint. Only three out of them in the partnership were the 1984 CBS television movie The Toughest Man in the World, the CBS television series Dreams and the NBC documentary series OceanQuest.

The company's first major hit was The Color Purple (1985). Guber-Peters owned the property of the book and hired Steven Spielberg to direct the film. Spielberg had barred the duo from the set. The company's next hits were The Witches of Eastwick, Rain Man, and Batman, all of which were box office hits. In 1986, the company partnered with Mark Damon to start Vision International, a film sales financing, but Guber and Peters decided to sell their stakes later.

In January 1988, Barris Industries merged with the Guber-Peters Company to form Barris/Guber-Peters. Guber-Peters made an aborted attempt to buy MGM/UA Communications Co. in 1988, but it failed. On March 31, 1989, Burt Sugarman sold his shares of Barris Industries to Westfield Group and Northern Star Holdings Ltd., the owners of Network Ten of Australia owned by Frank Lowy for $34.5 million.

On September 7, 1989, Barris Industries was renamed as the Guber-Peters Entertainment Company, Barris Program Sales was renamed as Guber-Peters Program Sales, and Barris Advertising Sales was renamed as Guber-Peters Advertising Sales. On September 29, 1989, a day after Sony Corporation of Japan announced to acquire Columbia Pictures Entertainment, Sony announced to acquire the Guber-Peters Entertainment Company for $200 million. The sale was completed on November 9, 1989 after Sony's acquisition of Columbia Pictures Entertainment a day earlier.

As a result, many of the films Guber-Peters was developing at Warner Bros., including The Bonfire of the Vanities, Batman Returns, This Boy's Life, With Honors, and Contact, was kept by the studio, although Guber and Peters were demoted to executive producers. During the time, when the studio was based at Columbia Pictures, the studio signed such talent deals like Laura Ziskin, who was a longtime friend of producer Jon Peters.

On November 5, 1990, CPE folded its first-run syndication unit Guber-Peters Television into Columbia Pictures Television Distribution. After the end of Guber-Peters, Peters went on to form his solo company Peters Entertainment in 1991, while Peter Guber formed Mandalay Entertainment in 1994.

== Productions ==
=== Films ===
Title	Release date	Distributor	Notes	Budget	Box office
Six Weeks	December 17, 1982	Universal Pictures	co-production with PolyGram Pictures	$9 million	$6.7 million
D.C. Cab	December 16, 1983	Universal Pictures	co-production with RKO Pictures	$8 million	$16 million
Vision Quest	February 15, 1985	Warner Bros.		N/A	$13 million
The Legend of Billie Jean	July 19, 1985	Tri-Star Pictures		N/A	$3.1 million
Clue	December 13, 1985	Paramount Pictures	co-production with PolyGram Pictures and Debra Hill Productions	$15 million	$14.6 million
The Color Purple	December 18, 1985	Warner Bros.	co-production with Amblin Entertainment and Quincy Jones Productions	$15 million	$98.4 million
Head Office	December 29, 1985	Tri-Star Pictures	co-production with HBO Pictures	$9-12 million	$3.3 million
The Clan of the Cave Bear	January 17, 1986	Warner Bros. (North America); Producers Sales Organization (International)	co-production with Jozak/Decade Productions and Jonesfilm	$18 million	$2 million
Youngblood	January 30, 1986	MGM/UA Entertainment Co.	co-production with United Artists	$8 million	$15.4 million
The Witches of Eastwick	June 12, 1987	Warner Bros.	co-production with Kennedy Miller	$22 million	$103 million
Innerspace	July 1, 1987	Warner Bros.	co-production with Amblin Entertainment	$27 million	$95 million
Who's That Girl	August 7, 1987	Warner Bros.		$17-20 million	$19 million
Caddyshack II	July 22, 1988	Warner Bros.		$20 million	$11.8 million
Gorillas in the Mist	September 23, 1988	Universal Pictures (North America); Warner Bros. (International)	co-production with Arnold Glichmer Productions	$22 million	$61.1 million
Missing Link	November 25, 1988	Universal Pictures	co-production with Kane International	N/A	N/A
Rain Man	December 16, 1988	MGM/UA Communications Co.	co-production with United Artists and Star Partners II Ltd	$25 million	$354.8-$429.4 million
Batman	June 23, 1989	Warner Bros.	co-production with PolyGram Pictures	$48 million	$411.6 million
Johnny Handsome	September 29, 1989	Tri-Star Pictures	co-production with Carolco Pictures	$20 million	$7 million
Tango & Cash	December 22, 1989	Warner Bros.		$54 million	$120.4 million

=== Television series ===
Title	Years	Network	Notes
Dreams	1984	CBS	co-production with Centerpoint
OceanQuest	1985	NBC	co-production with Centerpoint and Ocean Images Productions
Quiz Kids Challenge	1990	First-run syndication	co-production with Chillmark Productions

=== Television movies/specials/pilots ===
Title	Air date	Network	Notes
Television and the Presidency	June 18, 1984	First-run syndication	co-production with Ailes Communications and On the Air
The Toughest Man in the World	November 7, 1984	CBS	co-production with Centerpoint
Brotherhood of Justice	May 18, 1986	ABC	co-production with Phoenix Entertainment Group, Margot Winchester Productions and Taper Media Enterprises
Clue: Movies, Murder & Mystery	September 17, 1986	First-run syndication	co-production with Paramount Television
Bay Coven	October 25, 1987	NBC	co-production with Phoenix Entertainment Group and Jerlor Productions
Superman's 50th Anniversary	February 29, 1988	CBS	co-production with Warner Bros. Television Distribution and Broadway Video
Nightmare at Bittercreek	May 24, 1988	CBS	co-production with Phoenix Entertainment Group and Swanton Films
Finish Line	January 11, 1989	TNT	co-production with Phoenix Entertainment Group
Kenny, Dolly and Willie: Something Inside So Strong	May 20, 1989	NBC	co-production with Kenny Rogers-Barris
Batman: The Making of a Hero	June 1989	First-run syndication	co-production with Mindseye Films and Warner Bros. Television Distribution
Kenny Rogers Classic Weekend	August 10, 1989	ABC	co-production with Kenny Rogers-Barris
Christmas in America	December 13, 1989	NBC	co-production with Atlantis Films, Kenny Rogers-Barris and King World Productions
Countdown	Unaired (taped: September 18, 1990)	First-run syndication	co-production with Katie Face Productions
Christmas on Division Street	December 15, 1991	CBS	co-production with Procter & Gamble Productions, Morrow-Heus Productions, Western International Communications and Columbia Pictures Television
