= The IndieProd Company =

American film and television production company

- Formerly: IndieProductions
- Type: Private
- Industry: Film; Television
- Founded: 1976; 50 years ago
- Founder: Daniel Melnick
- Defunct: 2009
- Headquarters: Los Angeles, California, United States
- Products: Motion pictures Television
- Services: Film production
- Parent: Carolco Pictures (1987-1992)

The IndieProd Company is a production company that was formed by Daniel Melnick in 1976 as IndieProductions after he left Metro-Goldwyn-Mayer.

== History ==
In 1976, Daniel Melnick announced that he had left Metro-Goldwyn-Mayer to start his own production company, IndieProductions (which was later shortened to The IndieProd Company). That year, he had signed a deal with Columbia Pictures to produce films on his own.

In 1978, Melnick was hired by Columbia Pictures in wake of the resigning of David Begelman, and The IndieProd Company was temporarily merged into Columbia Pictures. He never meant to be a studio head and left in 1978 to turn back into an independent producer, and Melnick was abruptly replaced as head by Frank Price, and quickly resurrected The IndieProd Company.

In 1980, Melnick moved to 20th Century-Fox where he quickly finished production on All That Jazz, and the same year he worked with Warner Bros. to produce Altered States. IndieProd had left the Fox lot in 1982 in order to make Footloose for Paramount Pictures. He moved back to Columbia Pictures after the completion of the movie, and after the deal ended, the company was acquired by Carolco Pictures in 1987. Under Carolco's leadership, the company produced hits like Air America and Universal Soldier. Around the same time, the company entered television production with a string of television movies, and later made its only television series, A Fine Romance, for Phoenix Entertainment Group.

In 1989, he formed a joint alliance with Ray Stark of Rastar Productions, to form Rastar/IndieProd. The joint venture went defunct in 1991. In 1992, Carolco had sold off The IndieProd Company in light of financial troubles, and The IndieProd Company announced a deal with Japan Satellite Broadcasting and TriStar Pictures to produce and distribute movies. In 1995, the production company attempted to merge with The Konigsberg Company, with funding from Electronic Arts, but failed. Also that year, it attempted a weekly TV series based on Universal Soldier, but never materialized. It also had a deal with Vietnam Television for Vietnamese television rights to the company's movies.

The company quietly went defunct in 2009 with the death of Daniel Melnick.

== Filmography ==
=== Film ===
==== 1970s ====
| Title | Release date | Distributor | Notes | Budget | Box office |
|---|---|---|---|---|---|
| All That Jazz | December 20, 1979 | 20th Century-Fox (North America theatrical and home video); Columbia Pictures (International theatrical and television) | uncredited | $12 million | $37.8 million |

==== 1980s ====
| Title | Release date | Distributor | Notes | Budget | Box office |
|---|---|---|---|---|---|
| First Family | December 25, 1980 | Warner Bros. | co-production with F.F. Associates | N/A | $15.2 million |
| Altered States | December 25, 1980 | Warner Bros. | uncredited | $15 million | $19.9 million |
| Making Love | February 12, 1982 | 20th Century-Fox | | $14 million | $11.8 million |
| Unfaithfully Yours | February 10, 1984 | 20th Century-Fox | uncredited | $12 million | $19.9 million |
| Footloose | February 17, 1984 | Paramount Pictures | | $7.5 million | $80 million |
| Quicksilver | February 14, 1986 | Columbia Pictures | co-production with Delphi V Productions | $10 million | $7.2 million |
| Roxanne | June 19, 1987 | Columbia Pictures | | $12 million | $40.1 million |
| Punchline | October 7, 1988 | Columbia Pictures | | $15 million | $21 million |

==== 1990s ====
| Title | Release date | Distributor | Notes | Budget | Box office |
|---|---|---|---|---|---|
| Mountains on the Moon | February 23, 1990 | TriStar Pictures | co-production with Carolco Pictures | $18 million | $4 million |
| Air America | August 10, 1990 | TriStar Pictures | co-production with Carolco Pictures | $30-35 million | $57.7 million |
| L.A. Story | February 8, 1991 | TriStar Pictures | co-production with Carolco Pictures | N/A | $28.9 million |
| Universal Soldier | July 10, 1992 | TriStar Pictures | co-production with Carolco Pictures and Centropolis Film Productions | $23 million | $120 million |
| Mary Shelley's Frankenstein | November 3, 1994 | TriStar Pictures | co-production with American Zoetrope and Japan Satellite Broadcasting | $45 million | $112 million |
| The Quick and the Dead | February 10, 1995 | TriStar Pictures | co-production with Japan Satellite Broadcasting | $35 million | $47 million |
| Universal Soldier: The Return | August 20, 1999 | TriStar Pictures | co-production with Baumgarten Prophet Entertainment and Long Road Productions | $22-45 million | $10.7 million |
| Blue Streak | September 17, 1999 | Columbia Pictures | co-production with Original Film and Jaffe Productions | $36 million | $117.7 million |

=== Television ===
==== Television series ====
| Title | Year | Network | Notes |
|---|---|---|---|
| A Fine Romance | 1989 | ABC | co-production with Phoenix Entertainment Group, New World Television, London Weekend Television and TF1 |

==== Television movies/pilots ====
| Title | Release date | Network | Notes |
|---|---|---|---|
| Tonight's the Night | February 2, 1987 | ABC | co-production with Phoenix Entertainment Group |
| God Bless the Child | March 21, 1988 | ABC | co-production with Phoenix Entertainment Group and Alliance Entertainment Corporation |
| Get Smart, Again! | February 26, 1989 | ABC | co-production with Phoenix Entertainment Group |
| Chain Letter | August 5, 1989 | ABC | co-production with Phoenix Entertainment Group |
| Challenger | February 25, 1990 | ABC | co-production with King Phoenix Entertainment |
| A Killing in a Small Town | May 22, 1990 | CBS | co-production with King Phoenix Entertainment and Hearst Entertainment |
| The Ghost Writer | August 15, 1990 | Fox | co-production with Alan Spencer Productions, Phoenix Entertainment Group and New World Television |
| Babies | September 17, 1990 | NBC | co-production with Hearst Entertainment |
| Tagteam | January 26, 1991 | ABC | co-production with Touchstone Television |
