= Jim Markham =

American hairdresser

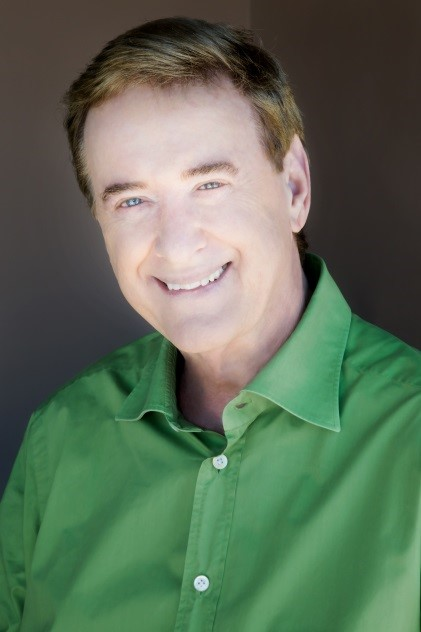
Jim Markham, American Hair Stylist and founder of 4 hair care companies

James Albert Markham (born December 22, 1943) is an American hair stylist and serial entrepreneur, who has founded four hair care companies– Markham Products, ABBA Pure and Natural, PureOlogy Serious Colour Care, and ColorProof Color Care Authority. He was taught by celebrity stylist Jay Sebring and took over Sebring International after Sebring was murdered by the Manson Family. Markham is known for advancing the Sebring cutting technique and introduced a generation of men to a new way of cutting and caring for their hair in the early 1970s, which emphasizes cutting hair in the direction it grows, daily washing and conditioning, and blow-drying. By 1973 Markham had improved upon the concept and took it nationwide over the next decade, coining the technique The Markham Method. Under his men's hair care line, Markham Products, he personally trained and certified thousands of barbers and stylists as Markham Style Innovators. The stylist's client list included many notable celebrities including Paul Newman, Steve McQueen, Frank Sinatra, Johnny Carson, Peter Lawford, Wolfman Jack, among many others. He also taught film producer and celebrity hairstylist Jon Peters the Sebring method.

Markham is known in the hair care industry for his innovative products in both the men's and women's markets, and he has won many awards for his contributions to the beauty industry. With his third company, ABBA Pure and Natural, he was the first-to-market with natural-based, vegan hair care products that qualified under PETA's guidelines to be vegan and cruelty-free and was permitted usage of PETA logo symbols. With PureOlogy, Markham pioneered the sulfate-free movement. Sulfate-free has become an industry standard in hair care, beauty and personal care products. With ColorProof, Markham has continued to lead the industry with innovation including professional hair care that are hypoallergenic, silicone-free and fragrance-free for color-treated hair. Markham's focus continues to be developing clean, non-toxic, environmentally-friendly and vegan products. Over the last several years, Markham and his wife, Cheryl Genis Markham, his partner in his last three companies, have devoted themselves to numerous charitable organizations.

Markham served as a technical consultant under Nancy Haigh, Set Decorator for Once Upon a Time in Hollywood. Markham's hybrid memoir/entrepreneurial guide was released in February 2020.

== Early life ==
Markham was born on December 22, 1943, in Houston, Texas, the youngest with a sister ten years older and a brother five years older. His parents divorced when he was a toddler, and he was primarily raised alone by his alcoholic mother Ruby, a waitress and short-order cook, in extreme poverty in Hobbs, New Mexico, and Farmington, New Mexico. His father, Albert Markham, was a truck driver and heavy equipment operator and rarely present. By the age of 15, Markham dropped out of high school to marry his pregnant girlfriend. He attended Lubbock Barber School in Lubbock, Texas, and became a licensed barber at the age of 16. By the time, he was age 22, he was the father of three children—Vickie, Robert and Jay – and had been divorced twice.

== Career ==
Markham began his career as a barber in Farmington, New Mexico, charging $1.50 per haircut. He began entering hair cutting and styling competitions, winning numerous awards including the silver medal in the Hair Olympics. In 1967, after reading in Playboy that celebrity stylist, Jay Sebring was charging $50 for a haircut, Markham went to Hollywood to challenge him to see who had the best styling technique. He lost the wager, but agreed to pay a franchise fee and learn Sebring's methodologies in hair styling. Markham opened the first Sebring International franchise in Albuquerque, New Mexico, and became Sebring's first distributor for Sebring Products with a territory that included four states: New Mexico, Arizona, Texas and Utah. He developed an educational program for the Sebring hair styling technique, signed on barbers as product distributors and designated shops and barbers trained in the technique as Sebring International-certified.

After Sebring's death in 1969, Markham became president and CEO of Sebring International, and took over Sebring's celebrity clients, and over the next two years expanded Sebring Products across the country using the educational program he'd established as a distributor himself. However, Sebring's father eventually put the company into bankruptcy. Markham and two partners bought the company from him and continued to expand.

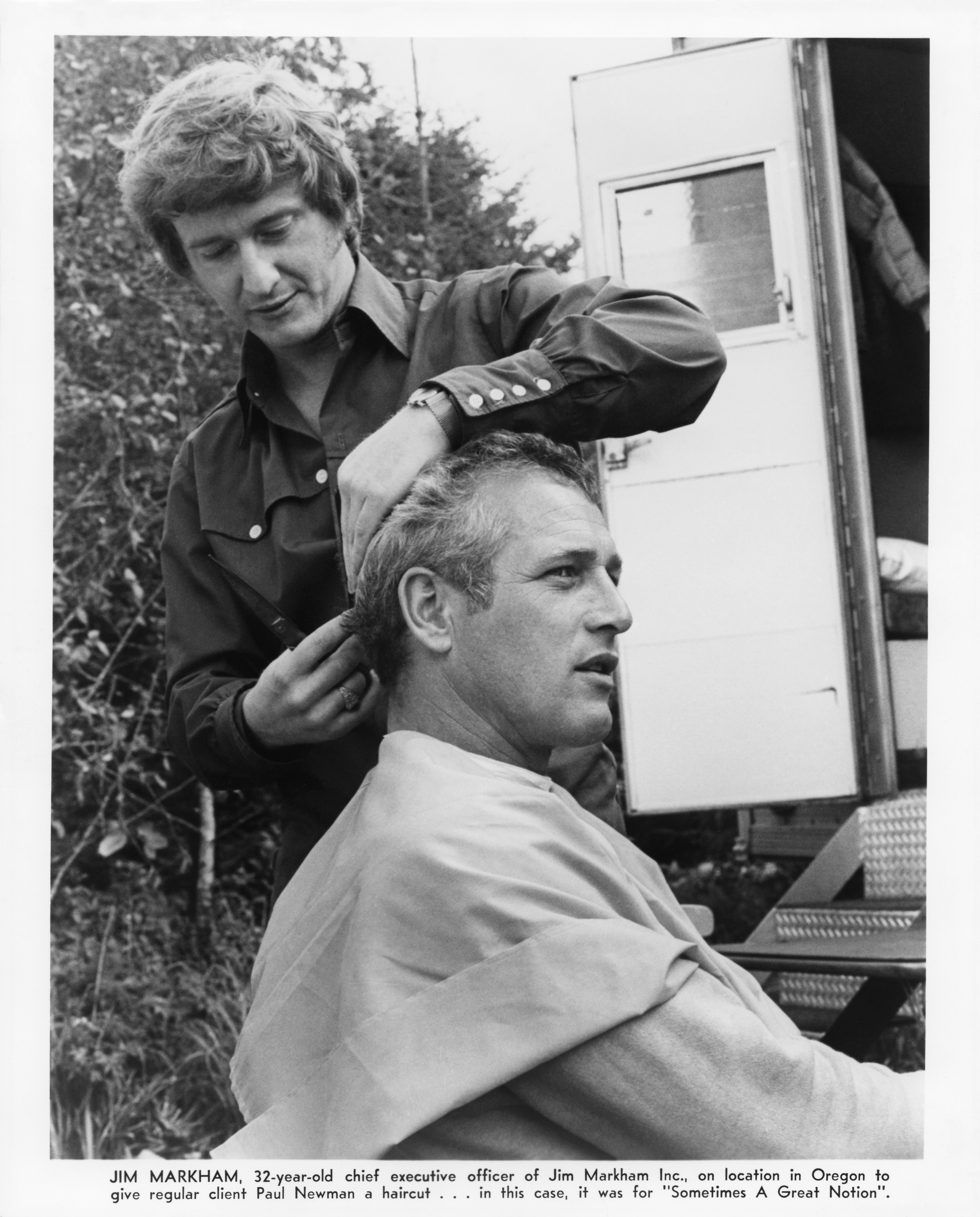
Jim Markham cutting actor Paul Newman's hair on the set of Sometimes A Great Notion, 1971

A partner dispute led to Sebring International being put into receivership. Eventually, Markham reached an agreement with his former partners that allowed him to form his own company. On his birthday in 1972, Markham, with the help of investors including British actor, Peter Lawford, founded Markham Products. By the following spring, Markham came out with his own line of men's hair care products that he sold through barbers-turned-distributors. He taught the hairstyling technique that he'd perfected – a natural, easy-care style – and certified barbers and shops as Markham Style Innovator shops. Throughout the 1970s and early 1980s, Markham continued to hold his title as the hair stylist to the biggest male stars. Paul Newman hired him as the onset hair stylist on every movie he did into the early 1980s, sometimes giving him movie credit. Markham appeared on national TV shows and got press across the United States as the highest paid hair stylist in the country at $55 per cut. Peter Lawford and Wolfman Jack made several public appearances with Markham to promote Markham Products and did radio spots and ads for the company. After almost a decade of running his own company, Markham sold Markham Products in 1981. He returned to Albuquerque and opened a salon with the intention of turning it into a franchised chain. Although he made the salon a success, he eventually realized his real entrepreneurial passion was in product development.

In 1989, Markham returned to California and founded ABBA Pure and Natural Hair Care to address a gap that he saw in the women's market. The brand started with four products and was one of the first 100% vegan lines in the United States. Markham's formulas for ABBA included extracts of plants, leaves, fruits, nuts and berries, with a spotlight on an environmental consciousness and a strong emphasis on education for salons and stylists in the professional beauty industry. Markham sold ABBA in 1997.

In 2001, PureOlogy Serious Colour Care began as the result of Jim Markham developing sulfate-free/carcinogen-free formulas for a friend of Cheryl Markham's diagnosed with ovarian cancer. She was unable to find carcinogen-free beauty products and asked Markham for help – the result were products not only safe, but also remarkable at preserving hair color. PureOlogy won the HBA Global Packaging award in its second year in business. Health and Allure both named PureOlogy as Best Shampoo. Within three years of its inception, the Irvine, California-based company that specialized in products designed specifically for color-treated hair passed the $25 million mark in sales.

TSG Consumer Partners, a San Francisco, California-based private equity company, became an investment partner and asked Markham to help with two other hair care companies in its portfolio. He became the CEO of Alterna and had a stake in and consulted for Sexy Hair.

By 2007, PureOlogy was on track to do more than $263 million in retail sales, up from $200 million in 2006. On May 8, 2007, PureOlogy was acquired by L'Oreal for $280 million under the professional products division, and relocated to its headquarters in New York City.

In 2011, Markham founded ColorProof Color Care Authority. Markham stays at the forefront of ingredient technology advancements by regularly consulting with ingredient suppliers and purveyors of essential oils and fragrances. One of his most recent achievements includes working with chemists to create a breakthrough system called BioRepair-8, a drug-free formula designed to help prevent hair loss and thinning. His latest innovation, SuperSheer, features the first professional silicone-free, fragrance-free, and clinically tested hypoallergenic products for color-treated hair.

== Awards ==
Through his five decades in the industry, Jim Markham and his products have garnered numerous awards. In 2019, he was presented the Intercoiffure Lifetime Achievement Icon Award. His company PureOlogy brought Markham recognition as Entrepreneur of the Year 2007 for Ernst & Young for consumer products, and was inducted into their Hall of Fame. In addition, that same year, he was inducted into Professional Beauty Association's (PBA) North American Hairstyling Awards (NAHA) Hall of Leaders in recognition for his achievements within the Industry. He also won the 2007 Orange County Business Journal Entrepreneur of the Year and the Independent Cosmetic Manufacturers & Distributors 2007 Cosmetic Innovator of the Year.

Other previous awards include 2002 Independent Cosmetic Manufacturers and Distributors (ICMAD) Entrepreneur of the Year, 2012 Beauty Industry West Entrepreneur of the Year and early in his career in 1967, he won the silver medal in Men's Hair Styling Olympics, the grand championship in the Men's Hair Styling National Championship, as well as the Southwest Regional Championship, Colorado State Championship and New Mexico State Championship.

== Philanthropy ==
Over the years, the Markhams have supported charities such as the National Ovarian Cancer Coalition (NOCC), Habitat for Humanity, SeriousFun Children's Network (formerly known as Hole in the Wall Gang Camp) and City of Hope where Markham and his wife, Cheryl, were recognized with the Spirit of Life Award. They have also been involved with environmental causes, and look for sustainable packaging solutions for ColorProof wherever possible including using post-consumer recycled plastics and recyclable paper products sourced from Forest Stewardship Council certified sources.
