= Monte Carlo (miniseries) =

1986 American TV series

- DVD cover
- Genre: Drama
- Based on: Monte Carlo by Stephen Sheppard
- Screenplay by: Peter Lefcourt
- Story by: Stephen Sheppard
- Directed by: Anthony Page
- Starring: Joan Collins; George Hamilton; Lisa Eilbacher; Lauren Hutton; Robert Carradine; Malcolm McDowell
- Music by: Stanley Myers
- Country of origin: United States
- Original language: English
- No. of episodes: 2

Production
- Executive producers: Joan Collins; Peter Holm
- Producer: Gerald W. Abrams
- Cinematography: Jean Tournier
- Editor: Bill Lenny
- Running time: 200 minutes
- Production companies: Collins-Holm Productions; Highgate Pictures; New World Pictures; Phoenix Entertainment Group
- Budget: $9 million

Original release
- Network: CBS
- Release: November 9 – November 10, 1986

Monte Carlo is a 1986 American two-part, four-hour television miniseries starring Joan Collins and George Hamilton. An adaptation of the 1983 novel of the same name by Stephen Sheppard, it is a spy thriller set in Monaco during World War II. The miniseries was produced by Gerald W. Abrams, Collins and her then-husband Peter Holm.

== Cast ==
Starring

- Joan Collins as Katrina Petrovna
- George Hamilton as Harry Price
- Lisa Eilbacher as Maggie Egan
- Lauren Hutton as Evelyn MacIntyre
- Robert Carradine as Bobby Morgan
- Malcolm McDowell as Christopher Quinn

Also starring

- Philip Madoc as Properi
- Leslie Phillips as Baldwin
- Peter Vaughan as Pabst

== Production ==
Adapted from the 1983 novel Monte Carlo by Stephen Sheppard (Summit Books, ISBN 0-671-44789-0), the teleplay was written by Peter Lefcourt. The miniseries was produced by Gerald W. Abrams, Collins and her then-husband Peter Holm. Directed by Anthony Page, it was reported to have cost $9 million.

== Broadcast and reception ==
The four-hour miniseries was broadcast in two parts on CBS starting on November 9, 1986. John J. O'Connor of The New York Times wrote that "Monte Carlo gives us the beginnings of World War II as they might have been conceived and executed by a couturier." He noted that Collins has "more than three dozen costume changes", and that she "is convinced that her fans want only romantic adventures and beautiful people in gorgeous clothes".

Collins also produced and starred in the CBS miniseries Sins earlier the same year.
