= Peter Holm (singer) =

Swedish singer (born 1947)

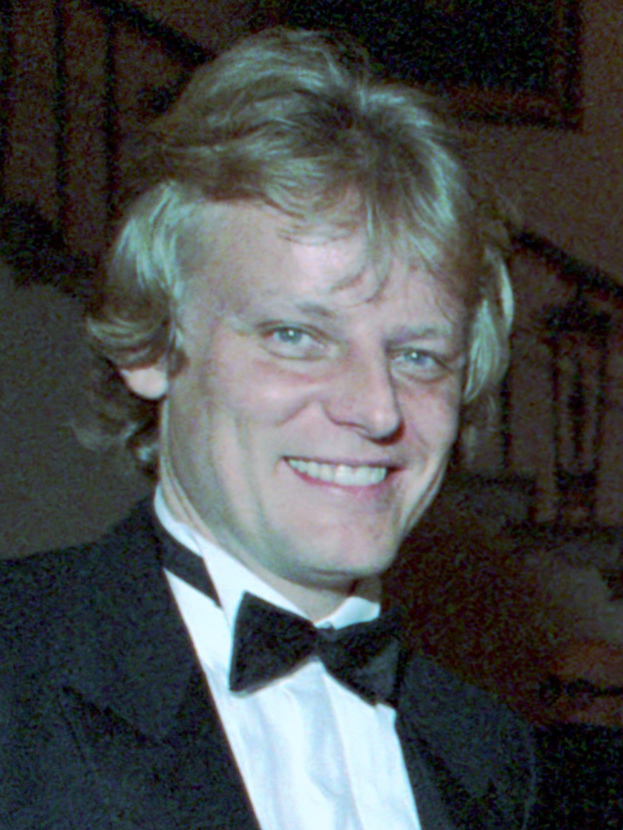
- Holm in 1984
- Born: Peter Gustaf Carl Sjöholm; 16 June 1947 (age 78); Stockholm, Sweden
- Occupation: Singer
- Spouse: Joan Collins (m. 1985; div. 1987)

Peter Holm (born Peter Gustaf Carl Sjöholm; 16 June 1947) is a former pop singer and Swedish playboy who was married to actress Joan Collins between November 1985 and August 1987. He became her manager and together they co-produced two of her television mini-series, Sins and Monte Carlo.

== Singer ==
Holm's pre-Collins singing career began with a psychedelic phase in the late 1960s before his high-pitched voice found its natural home doing Euro-pop. His best known song is "Monja" (aka "Monia" in the French version). Other songs included "Syster Jane" (a Swedish cover version of New World's "Sister Jane") and "You Will Be Mine".

== Marriage ==
Holm married actress Joan Collins 6 November 1985. Collins sought an annulment in December 1986 but was unsuccessful in this pursuit and ultimately was instead granted a divorce on 24 August 1987. According to Collins, the marriage quickly degenerated into a string of "interminable arguments... and hearty crockery-throwing rows." She said Holm was a bully with a ferocious temper and "the most combative person I've ever met."

In December 1986, Collins received a restraining order against Holm. Undaunted, he gave interviews blaming Collins's identification with her Dynasty character. "Joan is consumed by Alexis, that's why she's doing this. She really loves me and I love her and we'll get back together, I know it." He contested a pre-nuptial agreement, limiting him to 20 per cent of Collins's $5 million earnings during their 13 months together.

Collins hired flamboyant divorce lawyer Marvin Mitchelson and the proceedings became a media circus. When Holm and his supporters picketed Collins' Beverly Hills house waving placards, he became a national punchline, with jokes from David Letterman.

At the trial, Mitchelson produced Holm's secret lover, an aspiring starlet called Romina Danielson, and grilled her so intensely she fainted on the stand.

Holm lost his case, collecting only $80,000, as agreed in the pre-nup. A New York radio station hosted a fundraiser for him and he retreated to Switzerland. Soon after the divorce, Holm inherited money of his own.

Collins gave her candid side of the break-up in Second Act, her second volume of memoirs, and subsequently referred to him only as "The Swede."
