= Julie Farr, M.D. =

- Genre: Medical drama
- Created by: Peggy Elliott; Ann Marcus
- Starring: Susan Sullivan; Mitchell Ryan; Dennis Howard; Beverly Todd
- Theme music composer: Fred Karlin
- Country of origin: United States
- Original language: English
- No. of seasons: 1
- No. of episodes: 6 (1978) + 3 (burned off 1979)

Production
- Executive producers: Gerald W. Abrams; Gerald Isenberg
- Production location: United States
- Running time: 60 minutes
- Production companies: The Jozak Company; Paramount Television

Original release
- Network: ABC
- Release: March 7, 1978 – June 26, 1979

Julie Farr, M.D. (initial episodes aired as Having Babies) is an American medical drama limited-run series that was cancelled after airing six of its nine episodes on ABC, from March 7 to April 18, 1978; the three remaining episodes were burned off 14 months later, in June 1979. It followed three television movies called Having Babies which aired from 1976 to 1978, and was not renewed after its initial run of episodes aired in March–April 1978. The series began airing as Having Babies but was renamed Julie Farr, M.D. during its short run after its lead character, played by Susan Sullivan.

== Background ==
A series of three movie specials called Having Babies (II and III for the latter installments) aired on ABC from 1976 to 1978. Following the airing of Having Babies III as the ABC Friday Night Movie on March 3, 1978, the storyline was continued as a six-episode "trial" one-hour series on Tuesday nights.

As of March 28, 1978, the show began airing under the title of Julie Farr, M.D., apparently to try to attract more male viewers. After the initial episode run was completed on April 18, 1978, the show was not renewed, though three unaired episodes were later shown in June 1979.

The show was the first American hospital drama that centered on a female character, and its failure caused some concern in Hollywood that such a show could not succeed, even though the poor quality of the story lines and fairly poor reviews of the show likely also played a part.

== Plot ==
The show starred Susan Sullivan as Dr. Julie Farr, a role which debuted in the Having Babies II movie.

== Reception ==
Initial reviews of the show, as it transitioned from its movie-status to a series, were somewhat negative. One review opined that Sullivan "plays a better than average medico," but that the show was "one of the finer comedies of the season," which was a rather big problem since the show was a drama. The National PTA, however, ranked it number 7 among the top 10 shows on television. Sullivan was also nominated for an Emmy for her performance.

The ratings for the series were far from stellar. Though the March 7, 1978 debut ranked 26th, the final episode tied for 60th place out of 68 prime time shows.

== Cast ==
- Susan Sullivan as Dr. Julie Farr
- Dennis Howard as Dr. Ron Danvers
- Mitchell Ryan as Dr. Blake Simmons
- Beverly Todd as Kelly

== Episodes ==
No.	Title	Directed by	Written by	Original release date
1	"The Weekend"	Unknown	Unknown	March 7, 1978
2	"Alien, Virgin, Workaholic"	Unknown	Unknown	March 14, 1978
3	"Old Friends"	Unknown	Unknown	March 21, 1978
4	"Sterile Wife"	Unknown	Unknown	March 28, 1978
5	"Captive"	Unknown	Story by : Renee & Harry Longstreet and Paul Huson; Teleplay by : Renee & Harry Longstreet and Gloria Banta	April 11, 1978
6	"Careers"	Unknown	Unknown	April 18, 1978
7	"Sisters"	Unknown	Unknown	June 12, 1979
8	"Transition"	Unknown	Unknown	June 19, 1979
9	"Rumors"	Unknown	Unknown	June 26, 1979
