= Cynthia Cidre =

American screenwriter and producer (born 1957)

- Born: September 10, 1957 (age 68); Havana, Cuba
- Education: University of Miami
- Occupations: Producer, screenwriter
- Years active: 1988–present

Cynthia Cidre (born September 10, 1957) is an American screenwriter and producer. She is best known as a showrunner and executive producer of TNT prime time soap opera Dallas (2012–14). Cidre was the creator and an executive producer for the CBS prime time soap opera Cane in 2007, and wrote the scripts for the films In Country (1989), A Killing in a Small Town (1990) and The Mambo Kings (1992). In 2015, she joined as co-showrunner another prime-time soap opera, Blood & Oil, on ABC.

== Life and career ==
Cidre was born in Havana, Cuba. At the age of 10, she immigrated to the United States with her family, and she later attended the University of Miami. She moved to Los Angeles and began a writing career. Her television film A Killing in a Small Town was nominated for six Emmy Awards in 1990. She later wrote critically acclaimed drama The Mambo Kings.

In mid-2000s, Cidre moved to television, creating and producing CBS prime time soap opera Cane (2007) about Cuban-American family. Aired during 2007–08 Writers Guild of America strike, Cane was cancelled after single season. In 2009, she was hired as a showrunner and executive producer of TNT prime time soap opera, Dallas, a revival of the prime time television soap opera of the same name that aired on CBS from 1978 to 1991. The series premiered on June 13, 2012, and on October 3, 2014, was cancelled after three seasons. In 2015, she joined as co-showrunner another prime time soap opera, Blood & Oil on ABC. Later that year, it was announced that Cidre has signed a two-year overall deal with ABC Studios for develop new projects.

== Filmography ==
- I Saw What You Did (1988) (screenplay)
- In Country (1989) (screenplay)
- A Killing in a Small Town (1990) (screenplay, producer)
- Fires Within (1991) (screenplay)
- The Mambo Kings (1992) (screenplay)
- Father Lefty (2002) (producer)
- Tara Road (2005) (screenplay)
- Cane (13 episodes, 2007) (creator, executive producer)
- Danny Fricke (2008) (executive producer)
- And Baby Will Fall (2011) (screenplay)
- Dallas (2012–2014) (writer, executive producer)
- Blood & Oil (2015) (executive producer)

== Awards and nominations ==
- Emmy Awards
  - 1990 — Primetime Emmy Award for Outstanding Made for Television Movie — A Killing in a Small Town (Nominated)
  Edgar Allan Poe Awards
  - 1990 – Best TV feature or miniseries — A Killing in a Small Town
