= Johnny Handsome =

1989 film by Walter Hill

- Theatrical release poster
- Directed by: Walter Hill
- Screenplay by: Ken Friedman
- Based on: The Three Worlds of Johnny Handsome by John Godey
- Produced by: Charles Roven
- Starring: Mickey Rourke; Ellen Barkin; Elizabeth McGovern; Forest Whitaker; Scott Wilson; Lance Henriksen; Morgan Freeman
- Cinematography: Matthew F. Leonetti
- Edited by: Donn Aron; Carmel Davies; Freeman A. Davies
- Music by: Ry Cooder
- Production companies: Carolco Pictures; The Guber-Peters Company
- Distributed by: Tri-Star Pictures
- Release date: September 29, 1989
- Running time: 96 minutes
- Country: United States
- Language: English
- Budget: $20 million
- Box office: $7 million

Johnny Handsome is a 1989 American neo-noir crime thriller film directed by Walter Hill and starring Mickey Rourke, Ellen Barkin, Elizabeth McGovern, Forest Whitaker, Lance Henriksen and Morgan Freeman. The film was written by Ken Friedman, and adapted from the novel The Three Worlds of Johnny Handsome by John Godey. The music for the film was written, produced and performed by Ry Cooder, with four songs by Jim Keltner.

== Plot ==
John Sedley is a man with a disfigured face, mocked by others as "Johnny Handsome." He and a friend are double-crossed by two accomplices in a crime, Sunny Boyd and her partner Rafe, and a Judge sends Johnny to jail, where he vows to get even once he gets out. In prison, Johnny meets a surgeon named Resher (Whitaker), who is looking for a guinea pig so he can attempt an extensive modern procedure in reconstructive cosmetic surgery. Johnny, figuring he has nothing to lose is given a new, normal-looking face (making him unrecognizable to the people who knew him) before he is released back into society.

Lt. Drones, a dour New Orleans law enforcement officer, is not fooled by Johnny's new look or new life, even when Johnny lands an honest job and begins seeing Donna McCarty, a normal and respectable woman who knows little of his past. The lieutenant tells Johnny that, on the inside, Johnny is still a hardened criminal and always will be. Drones's hunch proves correct. Johnny cannot forget his sworn vengeance against Sunny and Rafe, joining them for another job, which ends violently for all.

== Cast ==
- Mickey Rourke – John Sedley/"Johnny Handsome"/Johnny Mitchell
- Ellen Barkin – Sunny Boyd
- Elizabeth McGovern – Donna McCarty
- Morgan Freeman – Lt. A.Z. Drones
- Forest Whitaker – Dr. Steven Resher
- Lance Henriksen – Rafe Garrett
- Scott Wilson – Mikey Chalmette
- David Schramm – Vic Dumask
- Yvonne Bryceland – Sister Luke
- Peter Jason – Mr. Bonet
- J. W. Smith – Mr.Stathansom
- Jeff Meek – Earl
- Allan Graf – Bob Lemoyne
- Ed Zang – Prestige Manager
- John Fertitta – Prestige Salesman
- Raynor Scheine – Gun Dealer
- Edward Walsh – Judge

== Production ==
=== Development ===
The novel was published in 1972. Film rights were bought that year by 20th Century Fox who announced the film would be produced by Paul Heller and Fred Weintraub for their Sequoia Productions Company. However the film was not made.

The material was optioned by Charles Roven who tried to interest Walter Hill in it in 1982. Hill turned it down. "I turned it down three years later and about two years after that", said Hill. "I thought it was a good yarn ... [but] ... At the same time, there is this plastic-surgery story I thought cheated on melodrama. It's one of those conventions of 1940's movies, like the missing identical twin or amnesia." Hill added that, "No studio wanted to make it, and I didn't think any actor would be willing to play it."

In 1987, Richard Gere was going to star with Harold Becker to direct. Eventually Al Pacino signed to play the lead. By February 1988 Becker was out as director, replaced by Walter Hill. Then Pacino dropped out and Mickey Rourke was cast instead.

In 1989, Walter Hill explained why he changed his mind:

First, I figured that Hollywood is based on melodrama anyway and, second, I thought up a way to present the story in a way that resisted histrionics. More importantly, I found an actor who could play Johnny and not make it risible. Someone who understood the pitfalls of the thing. The main thing is that motion pictures have conditioned us to expect psychological realism. This is a drama in a different category. It's about moral choices ... I knew I was on very thin ice. If you let any histrionics in, it will fall apart. You have to trust the drama of the whole rather than an individual scene. And that's antithetical to most actors. They want to know, 'Where's my big moment? When do I get to cry and scream?' Mickey understood that.

"I'm drawn to characters where there's no happy ending, where things aren't rosy in the end", said Rourke. "It's not a happy world and there aren't easy, sappy endings to life."

Hill said the film was reminiscent of 1940s film noir:

You have the doomed character, and audiences back then were more comfortable with it. You can imagine John Garfield having a lot of fun with something like this ... But this one has a hard road commercially, and I'd like to see it have a chance to find an audience that will be interested. Some people like the movie and others are really offended by it. That's fine with me. I like movies that stir things up a little.

"I wanted a very neutral palette", said Hill. "If I had my druthers, I'd rather have made it a black-and-white film. I don't think you can make a real film noir without shooting it in black-and-white. But that wasn't one of the options. You either have to have a star or a director that has sufficient clout. This did not fit into any of those categories."

"The audience is invited to anticipate the drama rather than be surprised", added Hill.

"Oh, there are action sequences in it, but it's not the heroes-and-villains kind of piece that people usually perceive to be an action film", Hill said. "I'd say it's more character-driven. ... Characters loaded down with psychoanalytic baggage bore me to death. My own belief is that Freud may have been a brilliant thinker, but Freudianism is completely without scientific basis. At least as `scientific' is usually defined." Instead of seeing character as something defined by puberty-related traumas, Hill prefers to see character defined by action – "what a man does", he says, "not what may or may not have been done to him in some faraway past." In this regard, the core of Johnny Handsome is " a character-is-destiny story ... Maybe more than film noir, it's a tragedy. Something that just as easily could have played in Elizabethan England or Ancient Greece."

"I don't think this is a very real movie", said Hill. "But at the same time, it's quite real once you understand where you are, once you're kind of `over there.' But not everybody can get over there. And I think that the people that can't get over there, you're not terribly interested in, anyway. Which is probably not the attitude of the marketplace, but ... there are some movies you make for different reasons, you know?"

The novel was set in New Jersey in the small time Mafia but Hill changed it to New Orleans, where he had shot Hard Times (1975). "I thought the small-time Mafia thing had been seen an awful lot, and I thought maybe a kind of look at redneck crime in a Southern city might be a little different", he said.

"New Orleans is the kind of place where you can believe anything is possible", he added. "It's got a Gothic quality... We don't use what the New Orleans tourists see. Just the edge of the film is New Orleans. The book is probably a truer psychological profile than the film. This is the musical version compared to the book. The movie at least presents that there's a lot of agony, though. God, the movie is so . . . dark."

Hill recognised the ending was likely to polarise audiences.

A lot of people, it just kicks 'em right in the head. This is a strange thing to say, but 30 or 40 years ago, I don't think the ending would have been quite so surprising. Because, even though Hollywood is built upon the convention of happy endings, in the old days there was always the 20 percent, or something like that, that weren't. And therefore, if you didn't give 'em a happy ending it wasn't, like, out of nowhere. Now, there's just no movies that are like this. They'll have muted, sad endings ... but the idea that you're gonna shoot down your protagonist, shoot him dead ... But, you know, at the same time I think the film does have a positive ending. It's not a happy ending, but it's a positive ending. I mean, the character does achieve redemption on his own terms. And he always understood what the stakes were, he understood the code he was living by ... But I suspect that that's probably too difficult a calculation for most observers ... I think there's a problem with audiences coming into the movie, because they don't know what to expect. I always thought the proper title of the movie should be, in the Elizabethan sense, The Tragedy of Johnny Handsome. If you told everybody that's what the title of the movie was, they'd kind of be prepared. The story is organized along the lines of a rather more classic tragedy. It's certainly organized around the principle that character is destiny. ... I think it's a movie about moral choice, not psychological truth. If there is such a thing as psychological truth. I think my movies are very much about character. I take the view of character that has basically prevailed for about 2,000 years, up until the end of the second World War. Which is -- this is a vulgar oversimplification -- but it's that `What I do is my character, my actions define my character.' After the second World War, thanks to theories of modern psychology and confusion about what was scientific and what wasn't, the definition of character became much more, `How did I become what I am?' I am not so much interested in that theory as I am in the previous theory. And I think that throws you profoundly out of step with your peers and with the critical community. Not so much around the world, but certainly in the United States. But I think it's changing.

=== Shooting ===
Shooting took place in November 1988 in New Orleans, where Hill had previously made Hard Times and Southern Comfort.

Ellen Barkin said she wanted to play her role because her character, Sunny

is one of the great female villains. I don't know if I've ever seen a female villain so evil. Sunny's just mean, that's all there is to it. And the great thing about Sunny in this movie is they just let her be bad. With women they always want to give explanations: she had such a terrible childhood or something. They can't just let women be bad... Sex is just one of the tools Sunny uses to get what she wants. And what she wants is money! Pure greed!

Hill said

I said to her, `Look, I don't know if you ought to do this thing. Because it's a good part. But you're at another kind of stage in your career and people might not think this is a real positive thing to do.' And she said, `Oh, (expletive). I'll never get a chance to play a villain this good. I want to do it.' And I was very happy. I wasn't trying to talk her out of it, I just thought that as a friend I should point out that there might be a down side. She wanted to really play a villain, really go for it. And I encouraged her in that direction.

Hill enjoyed working with Rourke:

Mickey understood, before I had to tell him anything, how to play the part. Which is one of the things about being a director: If you have to explain these things, it'll never work. The casting is the most important thing you're gonna do in terms of directing the actor. You cast the right person who believes in it and who you feel has an understanding similar to yours. I think people confuse being a motion picture director with being an acting coach. I don't think that I directed him 50 lines in the whole movie. If it's all happening the way you want it to happen, don't put your foot through it. Let it happen. He's got very good instincts. His sense of integrity is such that he's made a lot of choices that have not been in the mainstream. Certainly in American movies. He's a big star in Europe. He's not a big star here, yet. I hope he will become one. All this stuff about him being such a bad boy and all that ... He's a very romantic fellow, I think. And like a lot of romantic people he's really disappointed by the way the world really works. And out of that disappointment I think sometimes he lashes out. He's not the easiest -- I don't want to make him sound like he's Ozzie Nelson or something. He's not. He does have a lot of emotions. But he's not a difficult fellow to work with.

"In most cases", Hill says, "producers hope for a huge American box office and treat the European market as a nice little bonus. We're doing the opposite. We're hoping to do respectable business here. But Mickey is a huge star over in Europe. 9 1/2 Weeks and Angel Heart did huge business over there."

Hill said Rourke had to spend hours getting into make up each day. "It was a hell of a hardship on him, poor bastard. He really did suffer. It was like going to the dentist every day, then having to give a performance after going to the dentist. He also worked with a speech therapist to learn the speech impediment that resulted from Johnny's cleft palate and harelip."

The music was done by regular Hill collaborator Ry Cooder. Hill said, "Whatever merit that any of these films I've done have, I'd be the first to say a lot of it has to be due to his contribution. Quite contrary to the usual theory about scores, one of the things I like about his scores is that I can always hear his voice in there. As much as they complement the movie, or serve the movie, they are still uniquely Ry. Ry surrounds a movie and plays through the atmosphere. I like that."

== Release and Reception ==
The film premiered in September 1989 at the Toronto Festival of Festivals. It also screened at the Venice Film Festival.

Johnny Handsome received mixed reviews from critics. It holds a rating of 59% on Rotten Tomatoes based on 17 reviews.

Henriksen and Barkin were nominated by the Chicago Film Critics Association for Best Supporting Actor and Best Supporting Actress, respectively.

Siskel & Ebert gave the film "two thumbs up", favorably comparing it to "some of the best film noirs of the '40s" and praised the strong performances by a well-cast ensemble.

=== Box office ===
The film was a box office failure. Hill later said "the foreign reception has been good but I think that's not unexpected. Whether it would work for an American audience was always problematic. I frankly never thought it would, given what it was, because it was a film that was certainly not a feel good movie. I liked it as a piece of work."

== Soundtrack ==
The soundtrack for the movie was written by Ry Cooder, with 4 of the 16 songs co-written with Jim Keltner. The music was performed by Cooder, Keltner and Steve Douglas, with occasional horn backing, arranged by Van Dyke Parks. The soundtrack was produced by Cooder.

== Home video release ==
After the film's theatrical run, the film was released on videocassette and laserdisc in 1990 by International Video Entertainment. In 2002, the film was finally released on DVD, but without any bonus material and was shown in only a full frame presentation.

In 2010 the film was released on Blu-ray through Lions Gate Entertainment in its original widescreen presentation.

== Legacy ==
In 2008, Slant Magazine published a review of the Mickey Rourke film The Wrestler which commented on the similarities between that and Johnny Handsome:

There is a moment, early on in the film, when he staggers down the street, through a bleak New Jersey morning, a great hulk of a man, too big for his clothes. His face looks battered and puffy, and suddenly, out of nowhere, I got an acute and clear memory of his performance as the deformed criminal in 1989's Johnny Handsome. In the opening shots of that film, "Johnny Handsome" skulks down the street; his face has a ballooning forehead, a bulbous nose, a cleft palate. We know it is Mickey Rourke because he is the star of the film, but we cannot tell it is him. The story of that film, of "Johnny Handsome" getting an operation on his face that leaves him looking like, well, a young and handsome Mickey Rourke, is the reverse of what we have seen happen in Mickey Rourke's real life. It is one of those odd art-meeting-biography truths. In The Wrestler, Mickey Rourke's actual face looks like the makeup-job he had done in that movie almost 20 years ago, and it's a strange, tragic thing to contemplate.
