= Hearst Entertainment =

American television production and distribution company

- Formerly: King Features Syndicate TV (1959-1981); Novacom, Inc. (1980-1981); King Features Entertainment (1981-1990)
- Type: Subsidiary
- Industry: Television distribution Television production
- Founded: June 10, 1959; 67 years ago
- Founder: Al Brodax
- Headquarters: New York City, New York, United States
- Owner: Hearst Corporation
- Divisions: Hearst Entertainment Productions; Hearst Animation Productions

Hearst Entertainment (formerly King Features Syndicate TV, Novacom, Inc., and King Features Entertainment) was an American television production company that was originally founded in 1959 by King Features Syndicate, under the supervision of Al Brodax. The company is owned by the Hearst Corporation.

Currently, Hearst still owns the animated library, even after Lionsgate acquired most of the live-action library in 2015. Meanwhile, Multicom Entertainment Group holds the rights to several of the titles once distributed by King Features/Hearst, mostly Leonard Hill productions.

== History ==
=== Predecessors ===
In 1959, Al Brodax, formerly of William Morris Agency was hired by King Features Syndicate, who was launching its in-house television production and film division.

The first product to came out was a series of 200 new Popeye the Sailor cartoon shorts for television, which was sold for first-run syndicaiton, came after the success and popularity of its theatrical cartoon shorts produced by Fleischer Studios and Famous Studios. The episodes were produced by Larry Harmon Pictures, Rembrandt Films/Halas and Batchelor, Gerard Ray Studios, Jack Kinney Productions and Paramount Cartoon Studios.

Two years later after the success of Popeye, King Features partnered with Paramount Pictures to co-produce three television cartoons based on its own intellectual properties Beetle Bailey, Barney Google and Snuffy Smith and Krazy Kat. Earlier on that year, the company also opened a Western office division that was led by Maurie Gresham.

In 1964, the company hit its stride when King Features decided to acquire the television animation rights to the rock band The Beatles, and decided make a cartoon based on the British rock band band The Beatles, for premiere in 1965 on ABC. The company followed it up by selling the cartoon Cool McCool to NBC in 1966. Also that year, the company acquired television rights to the film adaptations of the comic strip, Blondie, from Columbia Pictures, for syndication release starting in 1966. In 1967, she had signed Helen Gurley Brown to star in a new television property for King Features Syndicate, Outrageous Options, which was debuted in syndication.

King Features had next produced its feature film, and its only effort, Yellow Submarine in 1968, which was distributed by United Artists, and it was a box office success. Also in 1968, King Features teamed up with Universal Television-based Kayro Productions to develop a television sitcom based on the comic strip Blondie, for CBS. In late 1969, the company struck a syndication deal with Firestone Film Syndication, where Firestone acquired the syndication rights to all of its properties. Also that year, Al Brodax had left the company in order to form his new venture, Folio One.

In 1972, the Hearst Corporation took full control of the Movietone News properties from Hearst and MGM and made research for all television programming. In January 1979, King Features hired Charles E. Shutt for new post of director of operations at both the King Features and Movietone units for the company. In December 1979, King Features had licensed the Blondie movies to Gold Key Entertainment and start syndicating there.

In 1980, Bruce L. Paisner, who was formerly the chief of Time-Life Films, had formed a television syndicator, Novacom, Inc., in conjunction with television station WGBH-TV in Boston. Its purpose was to syndicate programming from WGBH-TV. In 1981, the company begin to be represented by Harvey Chertok & Company.

=== King Features Entertainment ===
On July 13, 1981, Hearst Corporation announced that the company purchased the assets of Novacom, Inc., and it was merged with King Features Syndicate's TV business, and it was renamed to King Features Entertainment. The company continues to exploit the contracts of WGBH-TV in order for King Features to handle national syndication of its shows.

In late 1982, King Features Entertainment decided to license three popular comic strip characters, Blondie, Beetle Bailey and Betty Boop to CBS and produce animated specials and series based on these properties. In December 1982, King Features Entertainment partnered with Hearst Broadcasting to form its subsidiary Hearst Broadcasting Productions, in order for Hearst Broadcasting to produce content, based on Hearst's newspapers, magazines and documentary programs.

In early 1983, King Features decided to add programs Olympic Cavalcade and Harry S. Truman to a list of properties in the syndication stable. In 1983, the company had absorbed the assets of television syndicator PolyGram Television, and most of its assets, including its current properties were transferred to King Features Entertainment. Also in 1983, King Features Entertainment had introduced a television show, Good Housekeeping: A Better Way, for the cable Daytime service.

In 1985, the company inked a deal with Orbis Communications, where Orbis is distributing the syndicated cartoon Defenders of the Earth, for first-run syndication, which premiered in 1986. Also, in 1986, the company cleared Dr. Ruth's Good Sez Show (later broadcast as Ask Dr. Ruth), starring Dr. Ruth Westheimer, for first-run syndication.

In 1987, the company partnered with producers Steve Tisch, Jon Avnet, Phoenix Entertainment Group, Robert Greenwald, Leonard Hill and Frank von Zerneck for a consortium project, The Movie Alliance, which was for syndication. Some of these went on to form the syndicator ACI in 1989. In 1988, the company licensed WCVB-TV's news format, Chronicle, to A&E for debut in 1988, after initial consideration in first-run syndication.

In 1989, the company had acquired Phoenix Entertainment Group, and Phoenix itself was renamed to King Phoenix Entertainment to reflect the change.

=== Hearst Entertainment ===
In mid 1989, Hearst Corporaiton is consolidating production, syndication and cable properties, with King Features Entertainment and King Phoenix Entertainment going to the consolidated division, the Hearst Entertainment and Syndication Group, transferring from the King Features Syndicate unit. As a result, on April 14, 1990, King Features Entertainment was renamed itself to Hearst Entertainment, or Hearst Entertainment Distribution (HED), while King Phoenix Entertainment was renamed to Hearst Entertainment Productions (HEP).

In 1992, the company had formed its animation subsidiary, Hearst Animation Productions, designed to develop animated series based on the Hearst properties. The company then made, via the animation division, Phantom 2040, which was designed for first-run syndication in 1994.

In 1996, the company had introduced a television series, which was a Canadian co-production, Popular Mechanics for Kids, which was designed for first-run syndication under the new FCC rules.

In 2000, Hearst Entertainment and National Productions (a unit of the National Video Center) teamed up to launch two properties for first-run syndication. Only one show, The Bravest, eventually came out of the deal.

In 2003, the company signed a deal with Tribune Entertainment, for the syndication of the company's TV properties. The TV properties would now end up at Lionsgate.

== Programs ==
Title	Years	Network	Notes
Popeye the Sailor	1960-62	Syndication	
Perspective on Greatness	1961–63	Syndication	
Comic Kings	1962-64	Syndication	
The Beatles	1965-67	ABC	
Cool McCool	1966-67	NBC	
Blondie	1968-69	CBS	co-production with Kayro Productions and Universal Television
The All-New Popeye Hour	1978-83	CBS	co-production with Hanna-Barbera Productions
The New Adventures of Flash Gordon	1979-82	NBC	co-production with Filmation Associates
Defenders of the Earth	1986	Syndication	co-production with Marvel Productions; distributed by Orbis Communications
Ask Dr. Ruth	1986–88	Syndication	
Popeye & Son	1987-88	CBS	co-production with Hanna-Barbera Productions
Esquire: About Men for Women	1989–90	Lifetime	
Brewster Place	1990	ABC	co-production with Amanda Productions, The Don Sipes Organization, and Harpo Productions
Beetle Bailey	1990	CBS	co-production with Marvel Productions
Veronica Clare	1991	Lifetime	
Eerie, Indiana	1991–92	NBC	co-production with Unreality, Inc. and Cosgrove/Meurer Productions
The Legend of Prince Valiant	1991-93	The Family Channel	co-production with I.D.D.H. and Polyphon Film-und Fernsehgesellschaft
What Happened?	1992–93	NBC	
Intimate Portrait	1993–2005	Lifetime	Some episodes only
Phantom 2040	1994–96	Syndication	
Portraits of Courage	1994–95	ESPN	
Essence of Life	1995–96	Syndication	
Rivals	1995–96	Discovery Channel	
The Magical Adventures of Quasimodo	1996	Family Channel	co-production with CinéGroupe, Tele Images and Astral Media
Flash Gordon	1996-97	Syndication	co-production with Lacewood Productions, Editions Dupuis France, Carrere Television and Mediatoon
Popular Mechanics for Kids	1997–2001	Syndication; Global	
Eerie, Indiana: The Other Dimension	1998	Fox Kids	
Famous Homes and Hideaways	2000–03	Syndication	
The Bravest	2001–02	Syndication	
