= A Killing in a Small Town =

CBS television movie (1990)

- DVD cover
- Genre: Crime drama
- Based on: Evidence of Love by: John Bloom; James Atkinson
- Written by: Cynthia Cidre
- Directed by: Stephen Gyllenhaal
- Starring: Barbara Hershey; Brian Dennehy; Hal Holbrook
- Music by: Richard Gibbs
- Country of origin: United States
- Original language: English

Production
- Executive producers: Judith A. Polone; Bruce J. Sallan
- Producers: Courtney Pledger; Dan Witt
- Cinematography: Robert Elswit
- Editor: Harvey Rosenstock
- Running time: 100 minutes
- Production companies: Hearst Entertainment; The IndieProd Company; King Phoenix Entertainment

Original release
- Network: CBS
- Release: May 22, 1990

A Killing in a Small Town, also known as Evidence of Love, is a 1990 American crime drama television film directed by Stephen Gyllenhaal and written by Cynthia Cidre. The film is based on the 1984 non-fiction book Evidence of Love by John Bloom and Jim Atkinson, and stars Barbara Hershey and Brian Dennehy. It premiered on CBS on May 22, 1990. Hershey won an Emmy in 1990 for Lead Actress Outstanding Lead Actress in a Mini-series or Special; the film was also nominated for 3 other Emmy Awards (Brian Dennehy for Outstanding Supporting Actor in a Mini-series or a Special, Outstanding Directing in a Mini-series or a Special, and Outstanding Drama/Comedy Special).

== Plot ==
Candy Morrison is a well-respected member of her church and community. After teaching a children’s Bible study, she leaves to pick up a bathing suit at the home of her friend, Peggy Blankenship, for Peggy’s daughter, Meg, who is staying the night with the Morrisons. Candy fails to return to the church in time for the children’s program later that morning; when she does return several hours later, she claims that just she lost track of time.

Later that night, Peggy’s husband, Stan, who is away on a business trip, becomes worried when Peggy fails to answer the phone and asks his neighbors to check on her. When the neighbors enter the Blankenship home, they discover blood in the bathroom and Peggy’s infant daughter crying in her crib. Eventually, they make their way into the utility room, where they find Peggy’s bloodied and mutilated body. It is revealed that she was struck with an axe more than forty times.

The police begin questioning various persons of interest, including Stan, who confesses to having had an affair with Candy prior to the murder. When questioned, she admits to the affair but says their relationship ended mutually. Detectives notice inconsistencies in Candy’s story, as well as matching bloody prints from the crime scene, and eventually come to believe she committed the murder. After an intense interrogation, Candy and her husband hire attorney Ed Reivers.

As the investigation intensifies, Candy confesses to Ed that she murdered Peggy, but in self-defense, and subsequently turns herself into the police. Desperate to build a defense and to uncover how Candy was able to calmly resume her daily life after the killing, he has Candy undergo hypnosis. During the session, she recovers a repressed childhood memory in which she was rushed to the emergency room after an accident, where her mother forced her to be quiet as she was screaming in pain.

As the trial ensues, Ed becomes concerned with Candy’s flat affect and feels that her lack of emotion will negatively affect the outcome of the case. He has Candy testify on the witness stand, and the events of the murder are shown from her point of view:

Candy arrives at Peggy’s home to ask if Meg can spend the night and go to the movies. Peggy agrees, and the two share a pleasant conversation. Peggy abruptly asks Candy if she is having an affair with Stan, and Candy reluctantly admits to it but assures her their relationship has been over for a long time. Peggy briefly leaves the room and returns with an axe and orders Candy not to see Stan again. As Candy prepares to leave, she goes to the utility room to get Meg’s swimsuit, where Peggy ambushes her with the axe. The two engage in a violent struggle. Candy manages to overpower Peggy and hits her with the axe repeatedly. She then showers in the bathroom and leaves.

After recounting the events, Ed, in an effort to make Candy express emotion, deliberately produces the axe in front of her, causing her to cry and scream hysterically. Candy is found not guilty, which outrages several people in the courtroom. After her acquittal, Candy struggles to move on with her life.

== Cast ==
- Barbara Hershey as Candy Morrison (based on Candy Montgomery)
- Lee Garlington as Peggy Blankenship
- Brian Dennehy as Ed Reivers
- Richard Gilliland as Ed Morrison
- John Terry as Stan Blankenship
- Hal Holbrook as Dr. Beardsley

== Production ==
The exteriors of the Morrisons' home and the Blankenships' home were filmed at 3925 Merriman Drive and 3905 Grifbrick Drive in Plano, Texas, respectively.
