= Jon Peters =

American film producer (born 1945)

- Born: John H. Peters; June 2, 1945 (age 81); Van Nuys, California, U.S.
- Occupations: Film producer, hairdresser
- Years active: 1976–present
- Spouses: Henrietta Zampitella (m. 1962; div. 1966); Lesley Ann Warren (m. 1967; div. 1975); Christine Forsyth (m. 1987; div. 1993); Mindy Williamson (m. 2001; div. 2004)
- Partner: Barbra Streisand (1973–1982) Pamela Anderson (2020)
- Children: 4, including Caleigh

John H. Peters (born June 2, 1945) is an American film producer and former hairdresser.

== Early life ==
Peters was born on June 2, 1945, in Van Nuys, California. Peters is of Cherokee (father) and Italian (mother) descent. While growing up in a rough neighborhood, Peters's father died when he was eight years old and his mother later remarried; Peters was later expelled from school and sent to reform school for a year when he was 12.

== Career ==
As a child, Peters was cast as an extra in Cecil B. DeMille's 1956 film The Ten Commandments.

Prior to becoming a producer, Peters ran away from home at the age of 14 and moved to New York City, where he found work as a hairdresser, beginning with dyeing women's pubic hair. Upon moving back to Los Angeles, he opened two salons and later took over his uncles' salon on Rodeo Drive, where he met Sue Mengers. In the early 1970s, he learned about Jay Sebring's method of cutting hair from Sebring's protégé Jim Markham, whereupon he designed a short wig worn by Barbra Streisand in the 1974 comedy film For Pete's Sake; Peters and Streisand then began a romantic relationship. He produced both Streisand's studio album ButterFly (1974) and her remake of A Star Is Born (1976), after being introduced through and working with Mengers. Of Peters, Mengers said: "He's like trying to withstand a hurricane. If it weren't for Jon, I'd be 20 years younger." For years, he worked with the Jon Peters Organization, and attempted to work with friends Peter Guber and Neil Bogart at a film division of Boardwalk Records, but in exchange for getting his profits on Caddyshack, he was forced to join PolyGram Pictures in 1980 and fired two years later to form The Guber-Peters Company.

Peters worked alongside Guber for the next ten years; the duo headed Sony Pictures from 1989 until 1991. Peters eventually left Sony to start his own production company, Peters Entertainment, in 1991; the company initially had an exclusive three-year deal at Sony, but eventually went to a non-exclusive deal and added another non-exclusive deal at Warner Bros. in 1994.

=== Superman ===
In the early 1990s, Peters bought the film rights to the Superman franchise from Warner Bros. In his Q&A/comedy DVD An Evening with Kevin Smith, filmmaker Kevin Smith talked about working for Peters when he was hired to write a script for a new Superman film, which was then called Superman Reborn and later Superman Lives. According to Smith, Peters had expressed disdain for most of Superman's iconic characteristics by demanding that Superman never fly nor appear in his trademark costume. Smith said Peters also suggested Sean Penn for the role based on his performance as a death row inmate in Dead Man Walking, which he said that Penn had the eyes of a "caged animal, a fucking killer." Smith went on to say Peters also wanted the third act of the film to include a fight between Superman and a giant spider, to be unveiled in a homage to King Kong. Peters later produced the 1999 film Wild Wild West, the finale of which featured a giant mechanical spider. The story is further touched upon by both Smith and Peters in the documentary The Death of 'Superman Lives'.

Smith met Peters after completing a script and said Peters suggested he include a robot sidekick for Brainiac, a fight scene between Brainiac and polar bears and a marketable "space dog" pet similar to the Star Wars character Chewbacca. In the documentary Look, Up in the Sky: The Amazing Story of Superman, Peters admitted that the Superman franchise was problematic for him, stating: "The elements that I was focusing on were away from the heart, it was more leaning towards Star Wars in a sense, you know. I didn't realize the human part of it, I didn't have that." Peters subsequently produced Superman Returns, the 2006 Superman film directed by Bryan Singer, and executive-produced Man of Steel, the 2013 Superman film directed by Zack Snyder. Peters says that he was banned from the Man of Steel set by producer Christopher Nolan because "my reputation scares these guys".

=== The Sandman ===
Peters was a producer for a planned adaptation of the Sandman comics for Warner Bros., which became stuck in development in 2001. Sandman creator Neil Gaiman called the last screenplay for the film that Warner Bros. sent him "not only the worst Sandman script I've ever seen, but quite easily the worst script I've ever read." In a 2005 interview regarding the film, Gaiman commented: "But Sandman movies, they just got increasingly appalling... They started out hiring some really good people... And then Jon Peters fired all of them and got in some people who take orders, and who wanted fistfights and all this stuff. It had no sensibility... they were horrible." As with the production of Superman Lives and Wild Wild West, Peters attempted to include a "giant mechanical spider" in the script. Gaiman would go on to leak the maligned script in an attempt to sabotage its production.

=== Proposed autobiography ===
Peters submitted a book proposal for his autobiography, which was self-written alongside Los Angeles writer William Stadiem. In the proposal, he described himself as someone who "came from the lower depths to become THE MAN in Hollywood, a master of seduction, production and psychology," and said he "has seen it all and knows it all, without ever being a know-it-all." Peters also reportedly intended to write about his sexual activities with Barbra Streisand, Sharon Stone and many other actresses. In 2009, he subsequently withdrew from the HarperCollins book deal after adverse publicity triggered by the leaking of the proposal and potential lawsuits.

=== Sexual harassment ===
In August 2011, Los Angeles jurors ordered Peters to pay a former assistant $3.3 million after finding she was subjected to sexual harassment and a hostile work environment during production of Superman Returns. The 44-year old single mother also claimed that she was unable to obtain work after the incident because of Peters's influence in the industry. The claimant was awarded compensatory as well as punitive damages in the case. Peters was credited as one of the producers of the 2018 film A Star Is Born, but did not receive certification from the Producers Guild of America to use the "p.g.a." designation after his credit. Director Bradley Cooper said he did not know of the sexual harassment allegations against Peters and that Peters was not present on the set of his film; he received a producer credit only because he controlled the rights to the 1976 film.

== Personal life ==
Peters married four times, each ending in divorce. The marriage certificate on his fifth marriage was never filed. Several of his marriages and relationships overlapped each other. Peters has four children from his marriages, the older three of whom are in the entertainment industry.

Peters's first marriage was to Henrietta Zampitella when he was 16. They were married from April 1962 to November 1966.

In May 1967, the year following his first divorce, Peters married actress Lesley Ann Warren, with whom he had his son Christopher. The couple divorced in 1975 after a two-year separation.

Barbra Streisand and Peters had a high-profile personal and business relationship from 1973 to 1982. Streisand went on to become godmother to his two daughters with Christine Forsyth.

Peters married his third wife, producer Christine Forsyth, in June 1987. Sometime after the couple's separation two months later, Christine Forsyth adopted daughters Skye and Caleigh Peters. After this severance, Peters allowed Forsyth and the girls to continue living in his Bel-Air property. Peters did not file for divorce until 1993 and later filed a request for her to leave the Bel-Air estate in 2006.

In 1994, Peters met Mindy Williamson, a breeder of Arabian horses, who was to become his fourth wife in 2001. After their 2004 divorce, they reunited from 2006 to 2009. Together, they have daughter Kendyl Peters.

In 2020, he became briefly involved with Pamela Anderson.

Peters reportedly became engaged to actress Julia Bernheim in February 2020. The announcement was made three weeks after his split from Pamela Anderson.

== Filmography ==
Producer unless otherwise noted.

=== Film ===
Producer

- A Star Is Born (1976)
- Eyes of Laura Mars (1978)
- The Main Event (1979)
- Six Weeks (1982)
- Vision Quest (1985)
- The Witches of Eastwick (1987)
- Caddyshack II (1988)
- Batman (1989)
- Tango & Cash (1989)
- Money Train (1995)
- My Fellow Americans (1996)
- Rosewood (1997)
- Wild Wild West (1999)
- Ali (2001)
- Superman Returns (2006)
- A Star Is Born (2018)

Executive credits

- Die Laughing (1980)
- Caddyshack (1980)
- An American Werewolf in London (1981)
- Missing (1982) (Uncredited)
- Flashdance (1983)
- D.C. Cab (1983)
- The Legend of Billie Jean (1985)
- Clue (1985)
- The Color Purple (1985)
- Head Office (1985)
- The Clan of the Cave Bear (1986)
- Youngblood (1986)
- Innerspace (1987)
- Who's That Girl (1987)
- Gorillas in the Mist (1988)
- Missing Link (1988)
- Rain Man (1988)
- The Bonfire of the Vanities (1990)
- Batman Returns (1992)
- This Boy's Life (1993)
- With Honors (1994)
- Man of Steel (2013)

=== Other credited participation in films ===
Year	Film	Role	Notes
1956	The Ten Commandments	Boy on Donkey Crossing Red Sea	Uncredited
1965	Dr. Goldfoot and the Bikini Machine	Hair stylist: Susan Hart	
1974	For Pete's Sake	Hair stylist: Barbra Streisand	
1981	The Pursuit of D. B. Cooper	Executive producer: Soundtrack album	
1988	High Spirits	Special thanks	
2002	The Guru	Head chef	
2006	Forgiveness	Caterer	

=== Television ===
Year	Title	Credit	Notes
1961	Shirley Temple's Storybook	Actor: The Ironmonger	
1979	Getting in Shape for the Main Event	Executive producer	Documentary
1984	Television and the Presidency	Executive producer	Documentary
1984	The Toughest Man in the World	Executive producer	Television film
1984	Dreams		
1985	Oceanquest	Executive producer	Documentary
1986	Brotherhood of Justice	Executive producer	Television film
1987	Bay Coven	Executive producer	Television film
1988	Nightmare at Bittercreek	Executive producer	Television film
1988	Superman 50th Anniversary	Executive producer	Documentary
1989	Finish Line	Executive producer	Television film
1995	Fast Track	Special thanks	Television film

== In popular culture ==
It has been said, partly by Peters himself, that he was the inspiration for Warren Beatty's character in the Hal Ashby film Shampoo.

Peters is portrayed by Bradley Cooper in the Paul Thomas Anderson film, Licorice Pizza (2021).

== Sources ==
- Griffin, Nancy; Masters, Kim (1996). Hit & Run: How Jon Peters and Peter Guber Took Sony for a Ride in Hollywood. Simon & Schuster. ISBN 0-684-80931-1.
