= Finish Line (1989 film) =

- Genre: Drama; Sport
- Written by: Norman Morrill
- Directed by: John Nicolella
- Starring: James Brolin; Josh Brolin; Mariska Hargitay
- Music by: William Olvis
- Country of origin: United States
- Original language: English

Production
- Executive producers: Jon Peters; Peter Guber; Gerald W. Abrams
- Producer: Stanley Brooks
- Production locations: Corvallis, Oregon; Eugene, Oregon; University of Oregon Hayward Field; Springfield, Oregon
- Cinematography: Jonathan West
- Editors: Douglas Ibold; Michael Renaud
- Running time: 95 minutes
- Production company: The Guber-Peters Company

Original release
- Network: TNT
- Release: January 11, 1989

Finish Line is a 1989 American made-for-television sports drama film starring real-life father and son James and Josh Brolin. The movie also features Stephen Lang as a hard-driving track coach and an early appearance by Mariska Hargitay as a student reporter. It was originally broadcast on the then-new TNT on January 11, 1989.

== Background ==
During Finish Line's production, Olympic sprinter Ben Johnson was disqualified from the competition for using steroids in what became a major scandal that made national news. Although the film was in the works before this scandal, its unfolding throughout the news brought the film inevitable timeliness. Josh Brolin, doing press for the film, said he thought steroids should be banned, but acknowledged the pressure athletes faced to get an edge on the competition.

The film was the first time the two Brolins had worked together. Its producers originally wanted to film at the University of Oregon but were turned down. They ended up filming in several locations across Oregon, including Corvallis.

== Plot ==
Glenn Shrevelow and Tito Landreau are childhood friends who share a mutual love of running. Their athletic prowess results in them receiving scholarships to a prestigious university. Their new coach tells them that they are among the fastest runners in the country and inspires them with visions of Olympic glory.

Glenn finds himself facing pressure from both his coach and his demanding father, himself a former runner, who pushes him to commit and excel. Desperate after falling behind in a race and facing the loss of his scholarship, he resorts to taking steroids after another track team member tells him that they will improve his performance and are the real "breakfast of champions".

It is during this time that Glenn meets Lisa Karsh, a student reporter doing a story on athletes and drugs and they begin to develop a romantic relationship. Glenn's journey into the world of drugs grows darker as he progresses from taking pills to injections. His father is furious when he find out but Glenn insists it is the only way he can excel.

Glenn finally pays the price when he suffers a heart attack after a grueling race. His heart has suffered massive damage and he is scheduled for a coronary bypass. Glenn's father begs his forgiveness after realizing he is partly to blame. Glenn is wheeled into the operating room and the final scene shows Glenn's father tearfully watching Tito win an Olympic race on television and dedicating it to Glenn who has died.

== Cast ==
- James Brolin as Martin Shrevelow
- Josh Brolin as Glenn Shrevelow
- Mariska Hargitay as Lisa Karsh
- Stephen Lang as Coach Harkins

== Critical reception ==
The Los Angeles Times praised the Brolins' performances but called the script and direction heavy-handed. The Chicago Tribune also praised the actors' performances, writing that their "sensitive and sympathetic performances" elevated the film above other "affliction-of-the-week" dramas.
