= God Bless the Child (film) =

- Genre: Drama
- Written by: Dennis Nemec
- Directed by: Larry Elikann
- Starring: Mare Winningham; Grace Johnston; L. Scott Caldwell; Obba Babatundé; Dorian Harewood
- Music by: David Shire
- Countries of origin: Canada; United States
- Original language: English

Production
- Executive producer: Bruce J. Sallan
- Producers: Andras Hamori; Denis Héroux; Dennis Nemec
- Production locations: Montreal; Toronto
- Cinematography: Laszlo George
- Editor: Peter V. White
- Running time: 93 min.
- Production companies: Alliance Entertainment; IndieProd Company Productions; Phoenix Entertainment Group

Original release
- Network: ABC
- Release: March 21, 1988

God Bless the Child is a 1988 drama film, directed by Lary Elikann. It depicts the struggles and sacrifices of a single mother, Theresa Johnson (played by Mare Winningham), in hope of a better life for her daughter, Hillary (Grace Johnston).

== Plot ==
Theresa Johnson is a single mother, who was abandoned by her unemployed husband some time after her daughter, Hillary, was born. The two live in a cramped apartment in the inner-city, within walking distance to Hillary's school and a luxury hotel, where Theresa works in housekeeping. The occupants of the apartment complex Theresa and her daughter live in are all notified of their eviction due to the city tearing down the apartments. Theresa has nowhere to go. Theresa clocks out of work early to look for a place for her and her daughter to live, but is fired the next day for leaving early. The two go from homeless shelter to homeless shelter, trying to find a place to stay. Often they sleep on the streets. At one shelter Theresa meets outreach worker Calvin Reed, who finds another place for Theresa to stay, while she receives welfare aid. The house is filthy and infested with rats. Theresa and Hillary settle into their new home, and the life of their neighboring family, the Watkins, is explored.

The Watkins are a poor African-American family who live in a house not much different from Theresa and Hillary. The father of the family, Raymond Watkins, abandoned the house long ago "because I am worth more to them gone than there" and doesn't pay child support. He is deeply hurt by this failure. The family receives welfare but can't afford anything other than necessities, and goes hungry during the "fourth week," or the end of the month when most families have run out of food stamps. The son, Richard Watkins, hopes to break the cycle of poverty that has plagued their family, by being the first person in their family to graduate from high school.

Theresa has just been evicted from her house by her confrontational landlord, after reporting the state of her house and the rat infestation to the Department of Health. Hilary contracts lead poisoning while living in the housing project while Theresa's landlord evicts her after she complains to the Health Department. Soon they return to the shelter, and Hillary's condition worsens and she collapses in the restroom. At the local hospital, Theresa is told by Hillary's doctor that if she contracts lead poisoning again, it can cause severe health and development problems. Since Theresa and Hillary have been forced to travel between shelters the cause of Hillary's lead poisoning can't be traced. Because of a lack of a steady home, Theresa cannot guarantee Hillary's safety.

Theresa consults Mr. Reed and concludes that the only way Hillary can live a healthy, normal life, free from poverty, is by giving her up. The only way this can happen immediately is if Hillary is abandoned. Theresa makes the decision to take Hillary to the park and leaves her for Mr. Reed to pick up. Before leaving her, she gives her a heart necklace and tells her that every time she looks at it she should remember that she loves her. When she leaves, Mr. Reed and another social worker take Hillary away, and the story ends with Theresa alone in the park, crying, as Hillary can still be heard crying for her mother.

Before the credits start, the statement "32.5 million people live in poverty in the United States, today. 13 million of them are children." is shown.

== Cast ==
- Mare Winningham as Theresa Johnson
- Grace Johnston as Hillary Johnson
- L. Scott Caldwell as Althea Watkins
- Obba Babatundé as Raymond Watkins
- Dorian Harewood as Calvin Reed
- Jennifer Leigh Warren as Sharee Watkins
- Davenia McFadden as Kathleen
- Mos Def as Richard Watkins
- Jose Soto as Bobby Gifford
- Shawana Kemp as Tracy Watkins
- Charlayne Woodard as Chandra Watkins
- Akuyoe Graham as Charlesletta
- Nicholas Podbrey as Kenny
- Brenda Denmark as Elizabeth
- Kate Lynch as Carrie
