= A Fine Romance (1989 TV series) =

- Genre: Comedy drama
- Created by: Peachy Markowitz
- Starring: Christopher Cazenove; Margaret Whitton; Ernie Sabella; Kevin Moore; Dinah Lenney
- Composer: John Du Prez
- Country of origin: United States
- Original language: English
- No. of seasons: 1
- No. of episodes: 12 (5 unaired)

Production
- Running time: 60 minutes
- Production company: Phoenix Entertainment Group

Original release
- Network: ABC
- Release: January 18 – March 2, 1989

A Fine Romance is an American comedy-drama television series that aired from January 18, 1989, to March 2, 1989 on ABC. The series was filmed on location at various places in Europe.

== Premise ==
A divorced couple work together as hosts of a travel show called Ticket to Ride. The locations they traveled to included Paris, Dublin, Budapest, and Malta.

== Cast ==
- Christopher Cazenove as Michael Trent
- Margaret Whitton as Louisa Phillips
- Ernie Sabella as George Shipman
- Kevin Moore as Miles Barrish
- Dinah Lenney as Friday Forrester

== Broadcast ==
The series was originally slated to air as a part of ABC's fall 1988 schedule, Sundays at 8/7c. However, the 1988 Writers Guild of America Strike had officially taken hold by the time of network upfronts in May, and A Fine Romance, along with all other scripted network shows, was affected. Although still featured in ABC's official fall preview reel as airing on Sundays in the fall, the series was soon announced to be on midseason status by the time the fall schedule was released, due to the strike delaying production. To fill the Sunday slot in the fall, ABC commissioned the revival of Mission: Impossible, one of many inexpensive programming alternatives the network was using to fill time during the strike.

The new M:I filled the Sunday 8 p.m. slot for several episodes until being moved to Saturdays in December 1988. Despite the Sunday slot becoming available, A Fine Romance instead premiered in January 1989 on Thursdays at 8/7c, where it replaced the cancelled freshman series Knightwatch. As was the case with the series it replaced, A Fine Romance lost out to The Cosby Show and A Different World on NBC and 48 Hours on CBS, and was pulled after barely two months. Five episodes remain unaired in the US, although the entire run was broadcast in the UK.

== Episodes ==
No.	Title	Directed by	Written by	Original release date	Viewers (millions)
1	"Desperately Seeking Louisa"	Thomas J. Wright	Peachy Markowitz and Jane Petteway	January 18, 1989	13.3
In Paris, Louisa tries to convince Michael to return to the show. Anne is kidnapped and Michael and Louisa work together to find her.
2	"A Horse is a Horse, Of Course, Of Course"	Stan Lathan	Ian Gurvitz	January 26, 1989	8.6
In Dublin, Louisa steals Michael's paycheck in order to buy a racehorse. Miles suspects his wife of having an affair with a butcher.
3	"Absence of Chalice"	Gabrielle Beaumont	Bill Froelich	February 2, 1989	7.6
In Ireland, Louisa and Michael finds out that they are still legally married. Two thieves are trying to find a chalice that the townspeople are hiding.
4	"Below Suspicion"	Reza Badiyi	John Amodeo	February 9, 1989	6.9
In Malta, both Michael and Louisa are preparing for dates. George tries to work a product placement into the show.
5	"The Day of the Third, Thin, Wrong Woman Who Knew All Too Much About Eve"	Gene Reynolds	Michael Aitkens	February 16, 1989	7.8
Michael and Louisa bet on who will be the first to start an argument. Louisa gets an assistant when she breaks her foot. George tries to cut the budget.
6	"A Yank and the RAF"	Kevin Hooks	Mark Lisson	February 23, 1989	6.8
Suffering the effects of a minor auto accident in France, Louisa dreams about herself and Michael in World War II.
7	"It's Just the Gypsy in My Soul"	Reza Badiyi	Peachy Markowitz and Kathy McCormick	March 2, 1989	6.3
In Budapest, Louisa tries to make up with Michael after she destroys his prized possession, a first edition book. She is also told she has only a week or two to live, causing an unexpected reaction from Michael.
8	"South by Southeast"	David Tucker	Ian Gurvitz	Unaired	N/A
Michael is mistaken for a man named Rappaport. Louisa tries to talk Michael into doing a Japanese dog food commercial.
9	"Double Indignity"	Harry Harris	Terence Brady and Charlotte Bingham	Unaired	N/A
In London, Louisa refuses to wear glasses. The show is filming at an old house owned by Michael's old girlfriend, and there is a rumor that the house is haunted by a ghost.
10	"School Daze"	Ray Austin	Peter Spence	Unaired	N/A
In England, Michael is invited back to his old school to accept an award. A mink coat falls out of the sky and lands on Louisa, but she is chased by the coat's owner and a thief.
11	"The Tomas Crown Affair"	Ray Austin	Terry Nation	Unaired	N/A
Michael breaks a tooth in Madrid after Louisa forces him to try some candy. Michael and Louisa are pursued by agents in San Francisco who try to get the diamond in Michael's tooth. Friday loses her luggage.
12	"Th-The-That's All, Folks!"	Harry Harris	Ian Gurvitz and Kathy McCormick	Unaired	N/A
In Santa Cruz, California, there is a rumor that the travel show will be cancelled. Louisa does not know that she has valuable baseball in her purse.
