= Carolco Pictures =

American independent film studio (1976–1995)

Carolco Pictures, Inc. Carolco International N.V.
- Formerly: Anabasis Investments, N.V. (1976–1984)
- Type: Public
- Traded as: Nasdaq: CRLC
- Industry: Entertainment
- Founded: March 30, 1976; 50 years ago (as Anabasis Investments) in Boca Raton, Florida, United States; January 20, 2015; 11 years ago (second iteration)
- Founders: Mario Kassar; Andrew G. Vajna
- Defunct: December 22, 1995; 30 years ago August 21, 2017; 9 years ago
- Fate: Bankruptcy, assets and name now owned by StudioCanal (first iteration); Renamed to Recall Studios (second iteration)
- Successors: Company: C2 Pictures Multimedia Entertainment (television operations); Library: StudioCanal (with some exceptions) Lionsgate (U.S. theatrical and home video distribution rights only) Rialto Pictures (U.S. theatrical distribution rights to select titles only) Sony Pictures (through TriStar Pictures) (U.S. theatrical and home video distribution rights to Cliffhanger only) Metro-Goldwyn-Mayer (Stargate (except U.S. home video distribution rights) and Showgirls (through United Artists) only) Paramount Pictures (through Republic Pictures) (television, online streaming and digital distribution rights only)
- Headquarters: Beverly Hills, California, United States
- Key people: Mario Kassar (chairman & CEO)
- Products: Motion pictures
- Owner: MGM (15%) 1992 to 1995
- Divisions: Carolco Television Productions; Carolco Home Video
- Subsidiaries: Orbis Communications; The IndieProd Company
- Website: carolcofilms.com

Carolco Pictures, Inc., also trading as Carolco International N.V. was an American independent film studio that operated from 1976 to 1995. Founded by Mario Kassar and Andrew G. Vajna, Carolco found success in the 1980s and early 1990s with blockbusters such as the first three films of the Rambo franchise, Field of Dreams, Total Recall, Terminator 2: Judgment Day, Basic Instinct, Universal Soldier, Cliffhanger, and Stargate.

In 1989, Vajna left to form Cinergi Pictures. In 1992, Carolco underwent corporate restructuring in a bid to reverse several years of losses. An attempt to return to profitability failed when the 1995 film Cutthroat Island lost $147 million, and Carolco filed for bankruptcy later that year.

== History ==
=== Studio formation and early years ===
"Andy would buy films from Italy for Hong Kong where he had a company there called Panasia. He needed the big movies, but he didn't know many people. I told him if he signed an exclusive deal with me, I would get (to) take him to all the big Italian companies. He did, and I got us the biggest titles. We had a film called The Sicilian Cross with Roger Moore. It was an Italian film and (with an) Italian director, but they shot one week in San Francisco to make it look like an American film. Andy and I bought it for $100K or something. We went to Hong Kong and sold it for $250K in two days. That's how we started Carolco."

— Mario Kassar explaining the beginning of his working relationship with Andrew Vajna in an interview with Deadline Hollywood

Carolco Pictures was founded through the partnership of two film investors, Mario Kassar and Andrew Vajna. The two were hailed by Newsweek as some of the most successful independent producers. By the age of 25, Vajna went from wig-maker to the owner of two Hong Kong theaters. Then, Vajna ventured into the production and distribution of feature films. One of Vajna's early productions was a 1973 martial-arts film entitled The Deadly China Doll which made $3.7 million worldwide from a $100,000 budget.

Their goal was to focus on film sales, with their first venture being The Sicilian Cross; eventually it went into financing low-budget films. Their earliest films were produced by American International Pictures and ITC Entertainment with Carolco's financial support, and co-produced with Canadian theater magnate Garth Drabinsky. The name "Carolco" was purchased from a defunct company based in Panama, and according to Kassar, "it has no meaning."

=== 1980s success boom ===
Carolco's first major success was First Blood (1982), an adaptation of David Morrell's novel of the same name. Kassar and Vajna took a great risk buying the film rights to the novel (for $385,000) and used the help of European bank loans to cast Sylvester Stallone as the lead character, Vietnam War veteran John Rambo, after having worked with him on the John Huston film Escape to Victory (1981). The risk paid off after First Blood made $120 million worldwide, and placed Carolco among the major players in Hollywood.

On May 15, 1984, Carolco Pictures signed an agreement with then-up-and-coming film distributor and fledgling studio Tri-Star Pictures, with Tri-Star distributing Carolco's films in North America; HBO (a partner in the Tri-Star venture) handled pay cable television rights, and Thorn EMI Video (later, HBO/Cannon Video) handled North American home video distribution rights. The first film to be released under the agreement was Rambo: First Blood Part II (1985).

The First Blood sequel was timed for the 10th anniversary of the United States' exit from the Vietnam War; that event garnered publicity for the new film, which also became a hit. Tri-Star and Carolco quickly renewed their partnership in 1986, which called for Tri-Star to distribute upcoming Carolco productions, including Rambo III, in a new multi-feature agreement. TriStar would release the majority of Carolco's films from that point on in the United States and some other countries until 1994.

The release of the two Rambo sequels were so instrumental to Carolco's financial success that the studio began to focus more on big-budget action films, with major stars such as Stallone (who later signed a ten-picture deal with the studio) and Arnold Schwarzenegger attached. These films, aimed at appealing to a worldwide audience, were financed using a strategy known as "pre-sales", in which domestic and foreign distributors invested in these marketable films in exchange for local releasing rights.

In January 1986, Carolco attempted to acquire troubled studio Orion Pictures—which had distributed First Blood for Carolco—via a corporate raid by Vajna and Kassar for control of their board. The takeover failed by May, when Metromedia acquired a controlling interest in Orion. That same year, Carolco hired tax attorney Peter Hoffman as their newest president and CEO, and he opted to provide financial backing to assist Carolco's growth.

Also in the same year, Carolco entered the home video distribution business; they purchased independent video distributor International Video Entertainment (IVE), which was in financial distress and nearly bankrupt, and Carolco intended to reorient the company. The transaction was finalized in 1987. This resulted in Carolco paying $43 million to HBO/Cannon Video (successor to Thorn-EMI Video) in exchange for the video rights to two of Carolco's upcoming releases, Angel Heart and Extreme Prejudice, allowing Carolco to relicense the pictures to IVE. IVE merged with another distributor, Lieberman, and became LIVE Entertainment in 1988. In addition to IVE, Carolco was also rumored to have been interested in acquiring Media Home Entertainment from Heron Communications, but the sale fell through.

Throughout the remainder of the 1980s, Carolco expanded into various other business sectors to further capitalize on the Rambo films and their other offerings. This included video retail holdings, licensing of their IP, an international division (which included deals with John Carpenter, Alive Films, and Canada's Alliance Entertainment Corporation), and television production and distribution via the buyout of independent syndicator Orbis Communications. In addition to its own library, Carolco also held the television rights to the films of Hemdale Film Corporation (including The Terminator and The Return of the Living Dead), Alive Films (including Kiss of the Spider Woman), HBO Premiere Films (including The Glitter Dome), and future subsidiary The Vista Organization. In 1987, the company had purchased The IndieProd Company.

In 1989, they purchased some assets from the bankrupt De Laurentiis Entertainment Group (DEG), including their production facility in Wilmington, North Carolina. In doing so, Carolco also obtained the production rights to Total Recall—an adaptation of Philip K. Dick's novelette, We Can Remember It for You Wholesale—which had been in development limbo for a number of years, and Schwarzenegger convinced Kassar and Vajna to pursue the project while letting him star and obtain creative influence. The resulting film, directed by Paul Verhoeven, was later released in 1990, grossing $261.4 million on a $48–80 million budget.

"After Rambo, we were trying to become a major studio. I felt that was the wrong direction. My feelings were very negative and it caused a lot of friction between Mario, myself, and Peter (Hoffman), who was by then Mario's right hand. I disagreed with where they wanted to go, and Peter played our egos against each other. He wanted to be a partner."

— Andrew G. Vajna explaining his reason for departing Carolco to Entertainment Weekly

By late 1989, disagreements between Vajna and Kassar had grown over the direction of Carolco; Kassar and Hoffman desired to further expand the company into a larger studio, while Vajna felt their expansion had become overly rapid. In November, Vajna formed his own studio, Cinergi Pictures, with The Walt Disney Company's Hollywood Pictures as a distribution partner. The following month, Vajna sold his shares of Carolco to Kassar for $106 million, increasing the latter's ownership of Carolco to 62%.

=== Early 1990s ===
In early 1990, the company hit its mark when Carolco and film director James Cameron announced a two-year partnership under the new Lightstorm Entertainment label. That same year, Pioneer Electric Corporation of Japan acquired a share in Carolco. The following year, Carolco formed a joint venture with New Line Cinema to form Seven Arts, a distribution company which primarily released much of Carolco's low-budget output. In 1991, syndicator Orbis Communications was renamed to Carolco Television, to better emphasize Carolco's connection. Also around this time, Carolco Home Video was established, with LIVE Entertainment as an output partner.

In 1990, following production of Total Recall, Arnold Schwarzenegger convinced Carolco to purchase the film rights to The Terminator from producer Gale Anne Hurd and the struggling Hemdale Corporation; Carolco already held the television rights to the film courtesy of its television distribution deal with Hemdale. Carolco obtaining the rights ended a long-term rights dispute between Hemdale and director James Cameron, and since a sequel had already been considered, Carolco opted to push forward with it to recoup their $17 million acquisition. Terminator 2: Judgment Day was then produced in a collaboration between Carolco, Cameron's Lightstorm Entertainment, Hurd's Pacific Western Productions, and Le Studio Canal + of France. With a budget of $102 million, Terminator 2 was the most expensive film ever made at the time; its budget involved a fast-paced pre-production phase, the lengthy and large-scale principal photography, the special effects (including CGI visuals for the T-1000), and mass marketing. Terminator 2 was released in July 1991, and it grossed $519–520.9 million, making it the highest-grossing film of the year and the highest-grossing film Carolco ever produced.

In 1988, Carolco purchased the theatrical film rights to Spider-Man from producer Menahem Golan via his studio, 21st Century Film Corporation, on the basis that he would serve as an executive producer. Golan had previously tried and failed to produce a Spider-Man film for his bankrupt studio, the Cannon Group, and selling the theatrical rights to Carolco—along with the home video rights to Columbia Pictures, and the television rights to Viacom—was his way of raising funds to revive production. By 1991, Carolco began pre-production on the Spider-Man film, and James Cameron was quickly hired as the writer and director. In 1993, towards the end of filming True Lies, Variety carried the announcement that Carolco received a completed screenplay from Cameron. This script bore the names of Cameron, John Brancato, Ted Newsom, Barry [sic] Cohen and "Joseph Goldmari"—a typographical scrambling of Menahem Golan's pen name, "Joseph Goldman"—with Marvel executive Joseph Calimari. Cameron stalwart Arnold Schwarzenegger was frequently linked to the project as the director's choice for Doctor Octopus, and future Titanic star Leonardo DiCaprio was considered for the titular role, Peter Parker.

Carolco also attempted to make Bartholomew vs. Neff, a comedy film that was to have been written and directed by John Hughes and would have starred Sylvester Stallone and John Candy, and entered into a deal with actor and filmmaker Robert Redford to make three pictures that would be released through Seven Arts; only one of them, The Dark Wind, would be released through Seven Arts as part of the deal, while the other two would be released by other distributors amidst Carolco's financial troubles.

=== Decline and collapse ===
The early 1990s recession caused production and marketing costs to increase, and while Carolco's high profile releases were successful—such as Total Recall, Terminator 2: Judgment Day, and Basic Instinct—Carolco was beginning to lose money, since the increased costs began to outstrip box office receipts. The studio had commonly mixed their blockbuster releases with their low-budget arthouse films, most of which were unprofitable. Competing studios and industry analysts also criticized Carolco for overspending on their high-budget films through reliance on star power and far-fetched deals (Schwarzenegger received a then-unheard-of $10–14 million for his work on Total Recall and Terminator 2; Stallone received similar salaries for his roles). By the end of 1991, despite Terminator 2's box office success, Carolco posted a $265.1 million loss. Losses of partnerships also threatened Carolco's stability and drove it towards bankruptcy.

In 1992, Carolco underwent a corporate restructuring, invested in by a partnership of Rizzoli-Corriere della Sera of Italy, Le Studio Canal+, Pioneer, and Metro-Goldwyn-Mayer (MGM). Each partner helped infuse up to $60 million into Carolco's stock and another $50 million for co-financing deals. MGM also agreed to distribute their films domestically after Carolco's previous deal with TriStar expired. The restructuring also involved Carolco reducing their staff and overhead, reducing major debts the studio owed to creditors and banks, and divesting its shares in LIVE Entertainment to a group of investors led by Pioneer. LIVE was later renamed Artisan Entertainment, and was bought by Lions Gate Entertainment in 2003. Cutbacks at Carolco also forced them to make a deal with TriStar over the funding of the Stallone-led action film Cliffhanger: Carolco sold full distribution rights in North America, Mexico, Australia, New Zealand, Germany, and France to TriStar in exchange for half of the film's budget. While Cliffhanger became a major box-office success, Carolco saw little revenue from the film since it ended up becoming a minority owner. In October 1993, Carolco was able to complete a merger with The Vista Organization.

Carolco's attempt to make more of its specialties proved to be more strenuous: their plans for a Spider-Man film with James Cameron, which had a projected budget of $50 million, were forced to be shelved, following a period of litigation; in April 1993, Menahem Golan filed a lawsuit against Carolco to revoke his contract with them, since Cameron had Golan's executive producer name omitted from the film credits. In February 1994, Carolco filed a separate lawsuit against Columbia Pictures and Viacom, in an effort to gain their home video and television rights to Spider-Man, but the suit backfired, when Columbia and Viacom counter-sued Carolco. In 1995, Carolco, Golan, Columbia, Viacom, and Marvel were all sued by MGM, who believed they should have inherited the film rights, upon acquiring the Cannon Group and 21st Century Films. Since the court did not rule in Carolco's favor, the Spider-Man film rights were reverted to Marvel and eventually sold to Columbia.

"We had the final meeting with the studio and we were all sitting at this boardroom table. They said, 'So the budget is $100 million. That's a lot of money. What kind of guarantees do you have that we will get it for 100 and it won't go up to 130?' He (Verhoeven) says, 'What do you mean, guarantees? There's no such thing as guarantees! Guarantees don't happen and if anyone promises you guarantees, they're lying! We don't even know that if you want out of the building here you won't get hit by a truck. There's no guarantee that we're going to make it 'til tomorrow! I cannot have control over God – I don't even believe in God, why am I talking about God? But someone, nature, could just rain for three months and then what do we do? How can I give you a guarantee? This is ludicrous!' I kept kicking him under the table and trying to tell him to shut up while we're ahead, but he just wouldn't, and that was it."

— Arnold Schwarzenegger explaining to Empire magazine on how Paul Verhoeven's refusal to guarantee a secured budget lead to Carolco cancelling Crusade in favor of Cutthroat Island

By May 1994, Carolco had two big-budget films in development: Crusade, a Schwarzenegger-led film based on a script by Walon Green and with Paul Verhoeven attached as director; and Cutthroat Island, a Michael Douglas-led swashbuckler film with Renny Harlin attached as director. At that point, the studio's financial losses and debts had worsened to the point they could only barely afford to finance one major project, and they could not cancel both projects, since financing from foreign investors was already in place. Carolco decided to push forward with Cutthroat Island as their comeback film while cancelling Crusade, since the latter's projected budget reached $100 million, and during a meeting with Carolco executives, Verhoeven refused to guarantee that it would not further increase.

Early in Cutthroat Island's production, Michael Douglas dropped out and was replaced by the less-bankable Matthew Modine. Geena Davis, cast as the female lead through Renny Harlin—her husband at the time—was already an established A-lister, but was coming off a string of flops. MGM hoped to advertise Cutthroat Island based on spectacle rather than cast, but they could not devote themselves into a full marketing campaign, since MGM was in the process of being sold at the time. In an attempt to raise more financing for the film, Carolco sold off the rights to several films in production, including Last of the Dogmen, Stargate and Showgirls. In October 1994, Carolco ran out of funds and Pioneer invested another $8 million. In April 1995, Carolco announced that it was unable to make interest payments on $55 million of debt. In November, Carolco filed for Chapter 11 bankruptcy protection. Cutthroat Island was released the following month and became a major box-office disaster, earning $16 million on a finalized $90-100 million budget.

=== Bankruptcy and aftermath ===
Without the expected box office returns, Carolco was forced to liquidate. In November 1995, the company agreed to sell its assets to 20th Century Fox for $50 million. As part of the deal, Fox would acquire the Carolco film library and the rights to make sequels based on its films, including Terminator 2: Judgment Day. Canal+ made a $58 million counterbid for the library in January 1996. Fox, which by then lowered their offer to $47.5 million, dropped their deal. Fox received a $1.25 million break up fee, as they already had a deal signed for the assets. Unlike Fox's bid, Canal+'s bid was only for the film library, and not the sequel rights to these films. Following the Canal+ sale, it was speculated that the sequel rights for Carolco films would later be sold to other parties in separate transactions.

During the bankruptcy proceedings, Carolco's finances underwent an investigation by the Internal Revenue Service (IRS), which claimed that from 1988 to 1990, Peter Hoffman had arranged for Carolco to commit to deferred compensation and tax evasion with understated incomes, as a means to maintain the studio's operations while preserving his own salary. Hoffman was consequently indicted of four counts of felony tax evasion, but in 1997, a plea bargain was arranged: he pleaded guilty to tax misdemeanor, he agreed to pay a $5,000 fine, and two of the charges were dropped.

While Mario Kassar and Andrew Vajna had no direct involvement with Hoffman's fraudulent activities, they collectively owed the IRS $109.7 million in back taxes and penalties from the studio's underpayments; the overdue taxes were later settled in 2002, with Vajna agreeing to pay $6.5 million and Kassar agreeing to pay $45 million. In 1998, Kassar and Vajna regrouped to establish C2 Pictures, an intended successor to both Carolco and Cinergi, and they went on to produce Terminator 3: Rise of the Machines and Basic Instinct 2, among other films. Concurrently, Hoffman proceeded to manage Seven Arts Pictures until 2014, when he received further criminal charges for defrauding the state of Louisiana's tax credit system.

=== 2015–2017: Resurrection of Carolco brand ===
Film producer Alexander Bafer purchased the Carolco name and logo years later. On January 20, 2015, Bafer renamed his production company Carolco Pictures, formerly known as Brick Top Productions. Bafer then recruited Mario Kassar as the chief development executive of the new Carolco. However, on April 7, 2016, it was announced that both Bafer and Kassar had left the company, Kassar taking with him one of Carolco's planned projects, a remake of the 1999 Japanese horror film Audition which he was producing. Investor Tarek Kirschen was then inducted as Carolco's CEO. In 2017, StudioCanal and Carolco reached an agreement whereby StudioCanal would have sole control of the Carolco name and logo and the Carolco Pictures company would be renamed Recall Studios. That agreement settled a legal dispute over the Carolco mark brought by StudioCanal. The arrangement took effect on November 29 of that year.

== Carolco's library ==
Carolco began selling off assets as early as 1991, when its television business—distribution unit Orbis Communications and the telefilm subsidiary Carolco Television Productions—were purchased by Multimedia Entertainment. The sale did not include the television distribution rights to Carolco's film library. Those rights would instead be licensed to Spelling Entertainment's Worldvision Enterprises in 1992 in order to pay off debt. In North America, with certain exceptions, those rights are held by Paramount Television Studios through Trifecta Entertainment & Media as the successor to Spelling/Worldvision.

After its bankruptcy, Carolco's remaining assets were sold off to other companies, most already sold during Carolco's existence. In March 1996, Canal+ purchased the library in bankruptcy court for a value of about $58 million. The ancillary rights to Carolco's library (up to 1995 with certain exceptions) are held by French production company StudioCanal, since its parent company, Canal+ Group, owned a stake in Carolco, eventually buying out its partners.

All other rights in terms of home video were (and for a majority of the library, still are) licensed to Lionsgate under an ongoing deal with StudioCanal. Lionsgate, in turn, licensed those rights in Canada to Entertainment One (which in turn was acquired by Lionsgate in 2023), although theatrical rights to most of the library were split between Sony Pictures (for Cliffhanger), and Rialto Pictures (for the rest of the library not already retained by its original distributors or passed on to other companies). The video rights to most titles previously released by Lionsgate in North America are now held outright by StudioCanal, and sublicensed to Kino Lorber.

Showgirls was sold in pre-production to United Artists and Chargeurs (now known as Pathé); both studios retained the film.

StudioCanal itself held full distribution rights in France, Germany, Australia, Ireland, and the United Kingdom. In other territories, StudioCanal licensed home video rights to Universal Pictures Home Entertainment until StudioCanal's global distribution deal with Universal expired in January 2022.

== Filmography ==
=== 1970s ===
Release date	Title	Notes
March 30, 1976	Street People	financing; produced by Aetos Produzioni; distributed by Agora Cinematografica in Italy and American International Pictures in North America
July 9, 1976	A Small Town in Texas	financing; produced and distributed by American International Pictures
July 28, 1976	Futureworld	financing; produced and distributed by American International Pictures
October 8, 1976	The Cassandra Crossing	financing; produced by ITC Entertainment; distributed by Embassy Pictures
March 23, 1977	The Domino Principle	financing; produced by ITC Entertainment; distributed by Embassy Pictures
March 31, 1977	The Eagle Has Landed	financing; produced by ITC Entertainment; distributed by Columbia Pictures
August 5, 1977	March or Die	financing; produced by ITC Entertainment; distributed by Columbia Pictures
March 30, 1979	The Silent Partner	distributed by EMC
May 11, 1979	Winter Kills	financing; distributed by Embassy Pictures
May 30, 1979	The Fantastic Seven	financing; produced by Martin Poll
September 1979	The Sensuous Nurse	financing

=== 1980s ===
Release date	Title	Notes
March 28, 1980	The Changeling	distributed by Associated Film Distribution
August 15, 1980	The Kidnapping of the President	financing; distributed by Crown International Pictures
September 5, 1980	Agency	financing; distributed by Jensen Farley Pictures
September 9, 1980	Suzanne	financing; distributed by 20th Century Fox
September 15, 1980	Shōgun	financing; distributed by Paramount Pictures
December 14, 1980	Tribute	financing; distributed by 20th Century Fox
February 1, 1981	Caboblanco	financing; distributed by AVCO Embassy Pictures
March 23, 1981	The High Country	financing; distributed by Crown International Pictures
April 10, 1981	The Last Chase	financing; distributed by Crown International Pictures
July 30, 1981	Escape to Victory	with Lorimar; distributed by Paramount Pictures
September 25, 1981	Carbon Copy	financing; produced by Hemdale Film Corporation and RKO Pictures, distributed by AVCO Embassy Pictures
December 18, 1981	Your Ticket Is No Longer Valid	financing
February 12, 1982	The Amateur	produced in association with Tiberius Film Productions; distributed by 20th Century Fox
October 22, 1982	First Blood	distributed by Orion Pictures
January 1985	Superstition	with Panaria, distributed by Almi Pictures
May 22, 1985	Rambo: First Blood Part II	first film under distribution pact with TriStar Pictures
March 6, 1987	Angel Heart	distributed by TriStar Pictures
April 24, 1987	Extreme Prejudice	distributed by TriStar Pictures
October 23, 1987	Prince of Darkness	international distribution only; with Alive Films, Larry Franco Productions and Haunted Machine Productions; distributed by Universal Pictures in the U.S.
March 18, 1988	Pound Puppies and the Legend of Big Paw	with The Maltese Companies; distributed by TriStar Pictures
May 25, 1988	Rambo III	distributed by TriStar Pictures
June 17, 1988	Red Heat	distributed by TriStar Pictures
September 15, 1988	Homeboy	North American distribution only through TriStar Pictures; with Redruby Ltd. and Palisades Entertainment Group
November 4, 1988	They Live	international distribution only; with Alive Films and Larry Franco Productions; distributed by Universal Pictures in the U.S.
November 11, 1988	Iron Eagle II	distributed by TriStar Pictures
December 2, 1988	Watchers	with Concorde Pictures, Centaur Films, Rose & Ruby Productions and Canadian Entertainment Investors No. 2 and Company; distributed by Universal Pictures
January 13, 1989	DeepStar Six	distributed by TriStar Pictures
April 7, 1989	Pathfinder	subtitled version of a film made in Norway
May 19, 1989	Food of the Gods II	distributed by Concorde Pictures
August 4, 1989	Lock Up	distributed by TriStar Pictures
September 29, 1989	Johnny Handsome	distributed by TriStar Pictures
October 27, 1989	Shocker	international distribution only; with Alive Films and Universal City studios; distributed by Universal Pictures in the U.S.
December 22, 1989	Music Box	distributed by TriStar Pictures

=== 1990s ===
Release date	Title	Notes
February 23, 1990	Mountains of the Moon	distributed by TriStar Pictures
March 29, 1990	Welcome to Spring Break	home media and television distribution in North America only, distributed by Columbia Pictures and Overseas Filmgroup internationally
June 1, 1990	Total Recall	distributed by TriStar Pictures
August 10, 1990	Air America	distributed by TriStar Pictures
September 21, 1990	Narrow Margin	distributed by TriStar Pictures
November 2, 1990	Jacob's Ladder	distributed by TriStar Pictures
December 19, 1990	Hamlet	Foreign distribution with Warner Bros., Icon Productions, and Nelson Entertainment
February 8, 1991	L.A. Story	distributed by TriStar Pictures
March 1, 1991	The Doors	with Bill Graham Films and Imagine Entertainment; distributed by TriStar Pictures
April 25, 1991	The Punisher	home media and television distribution in North America only, distributed by New World Pictures and 20th Century Fox internationally
July 3, 1991	Terminator 2: Judgment Day	with Lightstorm Entertainment and Le Studio Canal+; distributed by TriStar Pictures
August 15, 1991	Bloodmoon	North American home media and international distribution only; with Village Roadshow Pictures
March 20, 1992	Basic Instinct	with Le Studio Canal+; distributed by TriStar Pictures
July 10, 1992	Universal Soldier	with Centropolis Entertainment; distributed by TriStar Pictures
October 9, 1992	Reservoir Dogs	international distribution only; with Live Entertainment; distributed by Miramax in the U.S.
December 25, 1992	Chaplin	with Le Studio Canal+; distributed by TriStar Pictures
May 28, 1993	Cliffhanger	with Le Studio Canal+; distributed by TriStar Pictures
August 26, 1994	Wagons East	last Carolco film to be distributed by TriStar Pictures.
October 28, 1994	Stargate	with Le Studio Canal+, distributed by Metro-Goldwyn-Mayer
September 8, 1995	Last of the Dogmen	with Savoy Pictures
September 22, 1995	Showgirls	with United Artists and Chargeurs
December 22, 1995	Cutthroat Island	distributed by Metro-Goldwyn-Mayer, last film to be released by Carolco

=== Seven Arts Pictures ===
Release date	Title	Notes
September 14, 1990	Repossessed	distributed by New Line/Seven Arts
September 28, 1990	King of New York	distributed by New Line/Seven Arts
February 1, 1991	Queens Logic	distributed by New Line/Seven Arts; with New Visions Pictures
May 10, 1991	Sweet Talker	distributed by New Line/Seven Arts; with New Visions Pictures
May 17, 1991	Dice Rules	distributed by New Line/Seven Arts
August 23, 1991	Defenseless	distributed by New Line/Seven Arts; with New Visions Pictures
September 20, 1991	Rambling Rose	distributed by New Line/Seven Arts
October 25, 1991	Get Back	distributed by New Line/Seven Arts; with Majestic Films and Allied Filmmakers
November 1991	The Dark Wind	distributed by New Line/Seven Arts; with Le Studio Canal+
June 21, 1992	Aces: Iron Eagle III	distributed by New Line/Seven Arts
June 26, 1992	Incident at Oglala	distributed by Miramax after closure of Seven Arts banner
August 21, 1992	Light Sleeper	distributed by New Line division Fine Line Features; last picture to be made under the Seven Arts banner
October 9, 1992	A River Runs Through It	distributed by Columbia Pictures after closure of Seven Arts banner; with Allied Filmmakers
July 30, 1993	Tom and Jerry: The Movie	distributed by Miramax after closure of Seven Arts banner; with Turner Pictures and Live Entertainment
