= Gerald W. Abrams =

American television producer

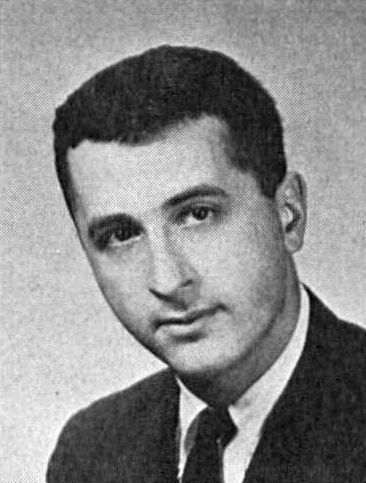
- Abrams in the Pennsylvania State University yearbook, 1961
- Born: Gerald William Abrams; 26 September 1939 (age 86)
- Education: Penn State University
- Occupation: Television producer
- Spouse: Carol Ann Abrams (m. 1964; died 2012)
- Children: 2, including J. J.
- Relatives: Gracie Abrams (granddaughter)

Gerald William Abrams is an American television producer who produced made-for-TV movies including Out of the Ashes (2003).

== Early life ==
Gerald William Abrams was born 26 September 1939, the son of Lillian Kodish and Samuel David Abrams, who owned an Army & Navy surplus store on Broad Street in Harrisburg, Pennsylvania.

== Career ==
Abrams graduated from Penn State University and began his television career with WCBS-TV as an account executive. He worked his way up through CBS Television's national sales to become head of the West Coast sales division. Shortly after that, he was appointed general sales manager of KCBS-TV, the CBS-owned station in Los Angeles.

In 1974, Abrams joined the Jozak Company as Vice President of Creative Affairs.

In 1974, Abrams produced It Couldn't Happen to a Nicer Guy. The black comedy television film stars Paul Sorvino and JoAnna Cameron.

In 1976, Abrams executive produced The Secret Life of John Chapman. The television film stars Ralph Waite, Susan Anspach, and Richard Arnold. It is inspired by the true story of John Royston Coleman, a college president. He took a sabbatical and went out and got jobs as a general laborer to try to experience life outside his well-ordered but insulated college environment. The Secret Life of John Chapman was produced for CBS and generated a 44 share.

In 1978, Abrams executive produced The Defection of Simas Kudirka. It is based on the true story of the attempted defection in 1970 by a Lithuanian seaman seeking political asylum in the United States. Kudirka was denied asylum and returned to the Soviets, charged with treason, and sentenced to ten years of hard labor. It was later discovered and verified that his mother had been born in Brooklyn and gone to Lithuania at a young age, which meant she was a U.S. citizen. As a result, Kudirka was declared a U.S. citizen and, in 1974, released by the Soviets. The Defection of Simas Kudirka was nominated for five Emmys; David Lowell Rich won for Outstanding Directing in a Special Program, and John A. Martinelli won for Outstanding Film Editing for a Special.

In 1978, Abrams formed his own company, Cypress Point Productions after breaking up with The Jozak Company. Through Cypress Point, he executive produced Letters From Frank, starring Art Carney and introducing Michael J. Fox, The Gift, starring Glenn Ford and Julie Harris, Act Of Love, starring Ron Howard and Mickey Rourke, Marian Rose White, starring Katherine Ross and Valerie Perrine, the CBS series Cutter To Houston, starring Alec Baldwin, Found Money, starring Dick Van Dyke and Sid Caesar, Scorned And Swindled, starring Tuesday Weld, Florence Nightingale, and the Emmy Award-winning A Woman Called Golda, starring Ingrid Bergman for Operation Primetime.

In 1979, Abrams executive produced Flesh & Blood, starring Tom Berenger, Denzel Washington and John Cassavetes. The film is about a convict that takes up boxing in prison, which brings a new meaning to his life. Once out, his trainer motivates him to become a professional boxer. He cares about only two other things, his uncomfortably close mother and absent father. Cassavetes was nominated for an Emmy as an Outstanding Supporting Actor.

In 1981, Abrams executive produced Berlin Tunnel 21. The film starred Richard Thomas, Horst Buchholz, and José Ferrer. The film concerns American soldier and a German engineer who join forces in Berlin in 1961 to build a tunnel under the Berlin Wall to smuggle out refugees, including the soldier's East German girlfriend.

In July 1985, Abrams formed Phoenix Entertainment Group with Gerald Isenberg, with funding from Richard Cohen, who had funded Isenberg's previous company The Jozak Company since 1982 through the millionaire company GIT (hence the abbreviation earlier on ACI Production Services, which is short for Abrams, Cohen and Isenberg). The company was one of the major members of the King Features Entertainment-affiliated The Movie Alliance. In February 1989, Phoenix was acquired by The Hearst Corporation, who owned television syndicator, King Features Entertainment, and initially renamed King Phoenix Entertainment. It was later renamed Hearst Entertainment Productions, where Abrams served as co-chairman for eight years.

In 1996, Abrams and Jennifer Alward of Morgan Hill Films formed Evolve Entertainment, folding Morgan Hill Films. They later parted ways in 1999.

In 1999, Abrams executive produced Black and Blue , based on the novel by Pulitzer Prize winner Anna Quindlen. The film was written and adapted by April Smith, starred Mary Stuart Masterson and Anthony LaPaglia for CBS, and debuted in 1999. The film is about Frances Benedetto, a victim of domestic violence. The movie follows Frances's relationship with her increasingly abusive NYCPD officer husband, who has the police force on his side, and her eventual escape to Florida with her son.

In 2003, Abrams executive produced 44 Minutes: The North Hollywood Shoot-Out, the FX Network's highest-rated show in its nine-year history. Also in that year, Abrams executive produced the Emmy-nominated television movie Out of the Ashes for Showtime, shot in Vilnius, Lithuania, starring Christine Lahti and directed by Joseph Sargent. Based on a true story, the film follows the journey of Gisella Perl, a Hungarian-Jewish doctor who survived Auschwitz but was later accused of collusion with the Nazis while applying for U.S. citizenship.

In March 2004, ABC aired The Mystery of Natalie Wood shot in Sydney, Australia, directed by Peter Bogdanovich, executive produced by Abrams, and based on Suzanne Finstad's biography of the actress Natalie Wood. Additionally, Abrams made See Arnold Run about Arnold Schwarzenegger's historic California recall election for A&E.

In 2005, Abrams and Bud Greenspan produced Four Minutes for ESPN, written by legendary Sports Illustrated writer Frank Deford. It starred Christopher Plummer, and chronicled Roger Bannister's feat of running a mile in under four minutes. Four Minutes was nominated for an Emmy and an ESPY Award.

In 2008, Abrams executive produced Daniel's Daughter starring Laura Leightonm written by his daughter, Tracy Rosen. In 2010, Abrams Fairfield Road starring Jesse Metcalfe for the Hallmark Channel, written by his daughter, Tracy Rosen. In 2011, Abrams executive produced The Pastor's Wife, starring Rose McGowan, for Lifetime Television. In 2009, Abrams executive produced The National Tree starring Andrew McCarthy, for the Hallmark Channel. In 2012, Abrams executive produced Duke starring Steven Weber, for the Hallmark Channel.

Gerald W. Abrams has executive produced over 70 films, most recently Love, Again, Christmas Shepherd, and Houdini, cable television's top-rated miniseries of 2014. Houdini, a two-part, four-hour miniseries for History, was written by Academy Award-nominated Nicholas Meyer and directed by Uli Edel. It premiered on September 1, 2014, starring Adrien Brody as Harry Houdini and co-starring Kristen Connolly (House of Cards) and Evan Jones. The film tells the story of the illusionist and escape artist who rose from poverty to worldwide fame and fortune.

Love, Again was Abrams' next TV movie to debut. It was shot for the Hallmark channel in 2015 and starred Teri Polo.

Abrams produced the four-hour miniseries Monte Carlo, shot entirely on location in France and was executive producer of A Father's Revenge for ABC, filmed in Berlin and starring Brian Dennehy and Joanna Cassidy. He executive produced Jekyll & Hyde, a two-hour movie for ABC and London Weekend Television starring Michael Caine and Cheryl Ladd, filmed on location in England; followed by Daughter Of Darkness starring Anthony Perkins, filmed in Budapest, Hungary, for CBS.

Second Honeymoon was produced with his late wife, Carol Abrams, and starred Roma Downey and Tim Matheson for CBS and was shot in Puerto Rico. Following the critical success of those films, Abrams executive produced the Hallmark Channel's A Christmas Visitor.

In addition to his television credits, Abrams was the executive producer of Hearts of Fire, a theatrical film for Lorimar Productions, starring Bob Dylan and Rupert Everett.

Abrams has appeared as an actor in Berlin Tunnel 21 (1981), a made-for-TV movie, and in his son's productions.

== Awards ==
Abrams has been nominated for two Emmys; the most recent was for Nuremberg, a dramatized account of the war crime trials following the defeat of Nazi Germany in World War II. Nuremberg was a four-hour mini-series for Turner Network Television starring Alec Baldwin and Christopher Plummer and directed by Yves Simoneau. Premiered in July 2000, the film was one of the highest-rated cable mini-series in history; it won four Emmy Nominations, Brian Cox won for the Best Performance by a Supporting Actor, and it received three Golden Globe nominations and a Producer's Guild Golden Laurel nomination. The film won a Gemini Award, Canada's equivalent of an Emmy.

Abram's second Emmy nomination was for Family of Spies. Family of Spies is a fact-based story of John A. Walker Jr., a Navy chief warrant officer with access to top-secret cryptographic communications. As a result of mounting debts, he sold secrets to the Soviets in 1967, continuing after that. He further sought to involve his four children in the espionage until his wife caught on to his activities. The film was shot in Vienna, Austria, and it starred Powers Boothe and Lesley Ann Warren. Warren was nominated for an Emmy as well.

In 2023 Abrams was given a Lifetime Achievement Award by Penn State and the Center County Film Festival.

== Personal life ==
His late wife, Carol Abrams, was a Peabody Award-winning producer and co-author of Shared Memories. They have two children: director-producer-screenwriter Jeffrey Jacob "J. J." Abrams and Tracy (née Abrams) Rosen, a screenwriter who has written TV films and series. The singer-songwriter Gracie Abrams is his granddaughter. He has five grandchildren.
