= Black Eye (album) =

Studio album by Fluffy
- Released: 17 September 1996
- Studio: Metropolis Studios in London
- Genre: Punk rock
- Length: 40:18
- Label: The Enclave
- Producer: Bill Price

Singles from Black Eye
- 1. "Hypersonic" Released: December 1995; 2. "Husband" Released: 1996; 3. "Nothing" Released: 1996; 4. "I Wanna Be Your Lush" Released: 1997

Black Eye is the only full-length studio album by the English punk rock band Fluffy, released in 1996 by The Enclave. It was recorded at Metropolis Studios in London and produced by punk rock veteran Bill Price, who had recorded albums by Sex Pistols and the Clash. The album was recorded live in the studio and the music was not arranged by the producer in order to achieve a rough, live sound. The record contains loud punk songs that explore social issues such as sex and abuse.

To promote the album, the band embarked on a major tour in Europe and both coasts of the United States, including a performance at CBGB in New York City. The songs "Husband" and "Nothing" reached number 58 and number 52 respectively on the UK Singles Chart. Upon release, Black Eye received mixed to positive reviews from music critics. Most journalists praised the album's unrelenting mood, but some criticised the vagueness of the lyrics. Prominent music critic Robert Christgau ranked it as one of the best albums of 1996.

== Background and recording ==
Black Eye is the only full-length album by the English punk rock band Fluffy. The band formed in London in late 1994 by singer and guitarist Amanda Rootes, guitarist Bridget Jones, bassist Helen Storer, and drummer Angie Adams. Unsatisfied with the Britpop invasion at the time, the band sought to recapture the punk rock phenomenon. According to Rootes, "We want to infiltrate and conquer the masses. It's like, Americans think English music's shit – 'cause it is. We want [England] to gain a little respect that we haven't had for a while." The band also felt more comfortable in North America than in the UK because the British press "can't handle the concept of a sexually frank all-girl band"; the name of the band comes from a lesbian novel titled Fluffy Butch, which Rootes thought was funny.

After turning down a number of record labels, the band signed to The Enclave, a record label run by A&R executive Tom Zutaut, who had previously signed Guns N' Roses to Geffen. Rootes felt that Zutaut was "great. Very American, very cool, very into his artists." Black Eye was recorded at Metropolis Studios in London and produced by punk rock veteran Bill Price, who had recorded albums by Sex Pistols and The Clash. The album was recorded live in the studio and the music was not arranged by the producer in order to achieve a rough, live sound. According to Rootes, Price "just recorded us live while we were playing. We did things like putting different guitar tracks on top and stuff like that. I did vocals at different times. But we really wanted to get a live sound." The drums were recorded in a stone room using a basic kit that was modeled after a Ringo Starr reissue model, which resulted in a slightly distorted sound. The album was mastered by George Marino at Sterling Sound in New York City.

== Music and lyrics ==
Musically, Black Eye was described by Carrie Borzillo of Billboard as "pure hardcore punk delivered with a raunchy, abrasive vocal assault from [Rootes]." Aaron Axelsen, music director at modern rock KITS, opined that the band is "a real indie, edgy version of Elastica, but not Britpop. They fit into that Hole, L7, Tuscadero, Veruca Salt, edgy thing." The band, however, felt "insulted" when journalists compared them to Elastica because they think the sound of Elastica is too "clean". As Rootes recalls, "I admit every time me and Bridget cleaned our house we put Elastica on". Despite this, she considers Elastica, along with the Sex Pistols and the Buzzcocks, as the only UK bands among her favorites. The band cited the Sex Pistols, the New York Dolls, and The Stooges as their musical influences. They also preferred the Sex Pistols over the Clash. According to Rootes, "The Sex Pistols are political in a great teenage fuck-you way. The Clash are political in a mature way, like they've done politics in A-levels."

The lyrics of Black Eye deal with sexual and abuse topics: "Nothing you will likely hear on the radio", Rootes explained. The song "Hypersonic", named after the best-selling vibrator in England, celebrates the joys of vibrator use. The title track, "Black Eye", is about domestic violence. Rootes remarked: "When I was growing up, my dad was really violent. I knew it was something I had to write a song about – to get it out of my system." The song inspired the album cover, which depicts a cat holding a mouse in its jaw. Rootes explained that the mouse's black eye represents a moment of serenity before it dies. Similarly, the song "Scream" deals with rape issues, while "Dirty Old Bird" is about spousal abuse. The track "Technicolour Yawn" is about the unpleasant effect of a hangover, "Psychofudge" is about drug usage, and "Cheap" deals with one's loss of virginity and the subsequent feel of becoming "sort of cheap and common."

Not all the songs from the album explore social issues. The songs "I Wanna Be Your Lush" and "Too Famous" use satire to criticise the superior attitudes of male musicians, while "Husband" disapproves "gruff and pushy" boyfriends. The band also clarified that they have nothing against men. As Rootes notes, "Men are great! We love them! We're talking about dickhead men, not all men." The band considered themselves more of a pro-girl band than a feminist band. Rootes told Select: "So many girls are afraid to be girls. Apart from Courtney Love, who's really feminine and uses her sexuality and is a strong woman. I don't think women should dress like boys. That's what's great about PJ Harvey. She was boyish and now she's gone really glam. She looks amazing and she's become an icon: a real woman."

== Promotion and release ==
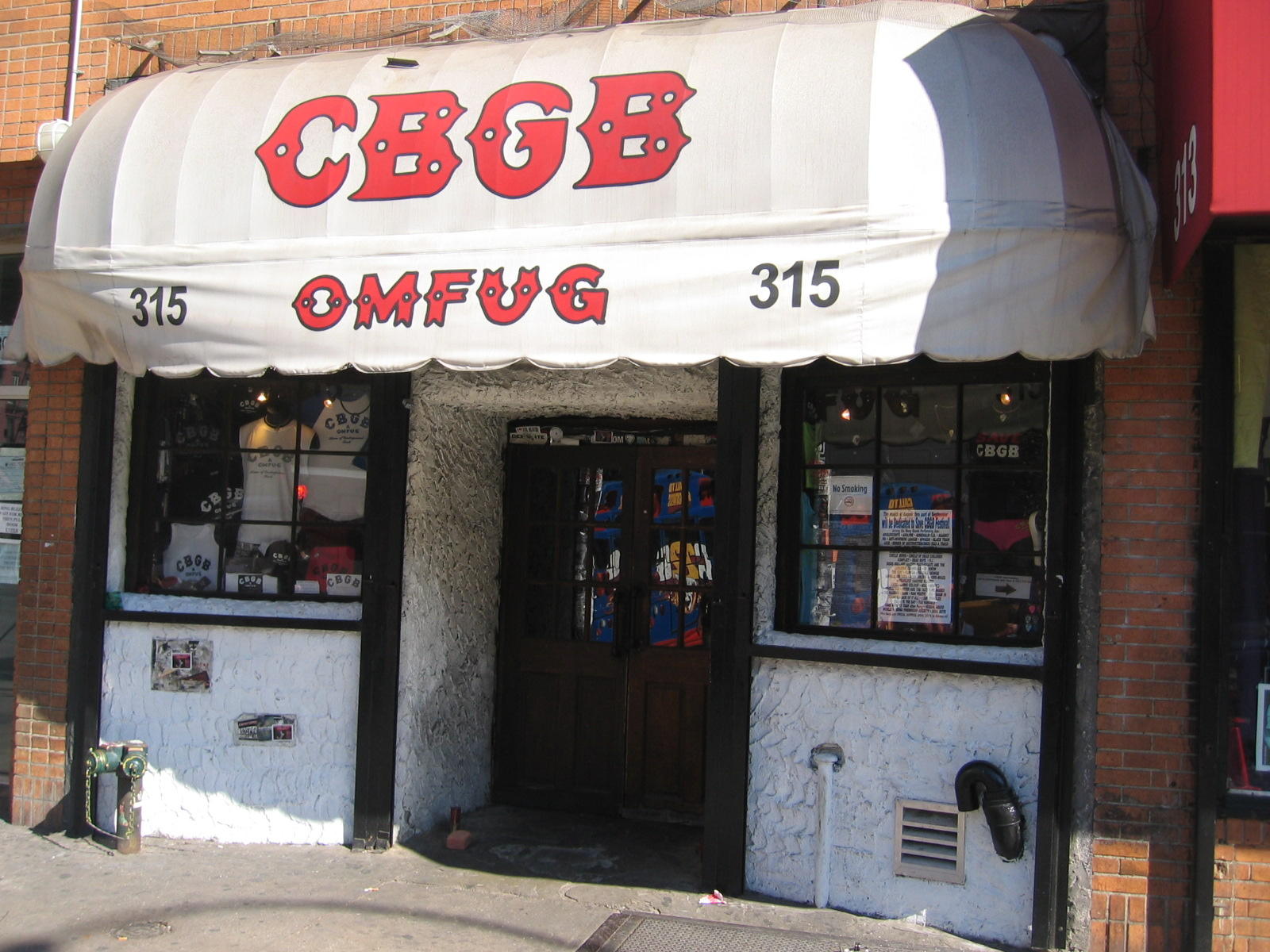
Prior to the album release, Fluffy performed at CBGB in New York City.

Black Eye is the first full-length album released by The Enclave. To promote the launch of the album, the record label, who had been working with the band since December 1995, released several singles for "Husband", "Psychofudge", "Cheap", and "Hypersonic" prior to the album release. The Enclave also released an EP consisting of five live songs recorded at New York's CBGB on 15 May 1996 and released on 9 July 1996 to further awareness of the band. Prominent music critic Robert Christgau described the sound of the EP as "as pure punk as the '90s get." Zutaut also admitted that the band's punk attitude "may scare radio and MTV a little bit", but he believed that their melodic music and lyrical statements "would pave the way for its success."

The band embarked on a major tour in both coasts of the United States in April, May, and September 1996. In Europe, the band also toured in Ireland with Foo Fighters, appeared at major summer festivals, and played with the Sex Pistols, Iggy Pop, and the Buzzcocks at Finsbury Park in London on 23 June 1996. The album was released on 17 September 1996 in the United States and 30 September 1996 in the United Kingdom. The songs "Husband" and "Nothing" reached number 58 and number 52 respectively on the UK Singles Chart. A music video was made for "Black Eye" under the direction of Floria Sigismondi.

== Critical reception ==
Professional ratings
Review scores
Source	Rating
AllMusic	4/5 stars
Drowned in Sound	8/10
Entertainment Weekly	B+
Q	3/5 stars
Select	3/5 stars
The Village Voice	A

Upon release, Black Eye received mixed to positive reviews from music critics. Tom Sinclair, writing for Entertainment Weekly, stated that the album "barrels forward with such high-spirited hookiness that it's possible to forgive the shameless pandering of lyrics like 'I wanna be your kitten/Caress my fur.'" In a very positive review, prominent music critic Robert Christgau felt that most of the songs "live up to the underlining" and considered the album to be the best punk debut since the ones by the Ramones, Sex Pistols, the Clash, and Wire. AllMusic reviewer Tom Demalon praised the loud guitar playing of both Rootes and Jones and opined that "the lack of dynamic diversity makes Black Eye somewhat of a one-trick pony, but it's a trick that makes the album's strongest tracks a joy."

Nick Duerden of Q remarked that Black Eye "sounds like a cross between the Stooges and Courtney Love. And despite boasting the musical dexterity of Status Quo, it's a short, sharp shock that dispatches its venom with a tireless guile." Similarly, critic Roy Wilkinson of Select compared some songs favourably to the Stooges and early-Siouxsie and the Banshees. However, he noted that the band "[seems] intent on falling short of PJ [Harvey]'s black-bordered presence. When was the last time you heard the Yeovil delta blues sound enlivened by such Carry On Riffing-isms as 'I've rocketed to Uranus' ('Nothing') and 'When the kids scream, there is a racket/You've got a magnificent packet' ('Too Famous')?"

In a negative review, Darren Gawle of Drop-D magazine criticised the lyrics for their vague observations about obvious truths, stating: "The only shocking thing about Black Eye lies in a band trying to pass themselves off as Riot Grrls when in fact they pack as much 'Grrr' as a slightly vexed Yorkshire Terrier." In contrast, Colin Weston of Drowned in Sound commented: "The thing about Fluffy, is they aren't the most lyrically challenging of bands, but their music more then [sic] makes up for it, and what they DO say, you understand immediately... not messing about with 'Deep and meaningful' lyrics, these girls have got something to say, and say it the only way they know how... in your face!!!" Although Black Eye was not ranked in the Top 40 of The Village Voice's Pazz & Jop critics' poll for 1996, Christgau placed it at number 3 in his own "Dean's List".

== Track listing ==
No.	Title	Writer(s)	Length
1.	"Nothing"	Amanda Rootes	3:37
2.	"Hypersonic"	Rootes	2:32
3.	"Black Eye"	Rootes, Helen Storer	3:34
4.	"Scream"	Rootes, Bridget Jones	3:41
5.	"I Wanna Be Your Lush"	Rootes	2:36
6.	"Crossdresser"	Rootes	2:19
7.	"Psychofudge"	Rootes, Jones, Pandora Ormsby-Gore, Angie Adams	2:37
8.	"Too Famous"	Rootes	2:10
9.	"Technicolour Yawn"	Rootes	3:43
10.	"Cosmetic Dog"	Rootes, Storer	2:51
11.	"Crawl"	Rootes, Storer	3:01
12.	"Husband"	Rootes	2:10
13.	"Dirty Old Bird"	Rootes, Jones, Adams	2:41
14.	"Cheap"	Rootes	2:48
Total length:			40:18

Japanese release bonus tracks
No.	Title	Writer(s)	Length
14.	"Pop His Cherry"	Rootes	2:46
15.	"Deny Everything"	Rootes	2:25

== Personnel ==
Credits are adapted from the album's liner notes.

Fluffy

- Amanda Rootes – vocals, guitar
- Bridget Jones – guitar
- Helen Storer – bass
- Angie Adams – drums

Technical personnel

- Bill Price – engineer, mixing, producer
- George Marino – mastering
- John Coding – design
- Phil Hope – management
- Elaine Constantine – photography
- Jake Walters – photography
