= California Music Channel =

Music television channel in San Francisco, California

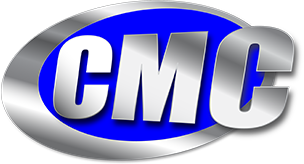
- Type: Broadcast television network (music videos)
- Country: United States
- First air date: March 1, 1982
- Availability: Worldwide (www.cmctv.com, CMC App)
- Founded: August 31, 1981 by Rick Kurkjian
- Motto: In the Air Everywhere, Over the Great San Francisco Bay
- Headquarters: San Francisco Bay Area
- Digital channel: KURK-LD San Francisco (3.1) KQSL-LD San Francisco (4.3) KFMY-LD Petaluma (6.3) KUKR-LD Santa Rosa (26.3) KKPM-CD Sacramento (28.13) KKRM-LD Chico (11.13) KRDT-CD Redding (23.13)
- Virtual channel: KURK-LD San Francisco (3.1) KQSL-LD San Francisco (17.3) KFMY-LD Petaluma (6.3) KUKR-LD Santa Rosa (27.3) KKPM-CD Sacramento (28.13) KRDT-CD Redding (23.13) KKRM-LD Chico (11.13)
- Language: English

California Music Channel (CMC) is an American music video broadcast television network based in the San Francisco Bay Area. It is one of the longest running local music video television stations in the world. CMC has been broadcasting music videos over the air in the Bay Area since 1982. CMC has grown from an hour-long program to two 24/7 stations with digital simulcast capabilities. The live broadcasts feature on-camera disc jockeys, audience participation, and contemporary music videos. It is owned by CMC Broadcasting Company, Inc. CMC is carried as a Digital Broadcast Network on nine Northern California television stations. CMC is also carried as a live linear channel on various Free ad-supported streaming television platforms and the California Music Channel App available for download to connected TVs and mobile devices.

== History ==
=== 1981–1982 ===
CMC was founded on August 31, 1981, by Rick Kurkjian, launching on March 1, 1982, as a half-hour show telecast twelve times per week on Teleprompter Cable Oakland Channel 12. The first three music videos to be shown on CMC were according to host Rick Kurkjian, "based on a theme of eyes, since this is the age of video," and included in order "Bette Davis Eyes" by Kim Carnes, "Private Eyes" by Hall and Oates, and "For Your Eyes Only" by Sheena Easton. The notion of a Bay Area Interconnect was developed early on as CMC expanded by doing local original cable channels on Concord TV Cable Ch. 11, Viacom Cable of San Francisco Ch 6, Viacom of Marin and Castro Valley Cable TV. After a little more than a year on the local cable channels CMC started running a Saturday night version of the program on KCSM-TV Ch 60 in San Mateo. The CMC broadcast was simulcast in stereo on KCSM-TV's sister station, KCSM-FM 91.1.

=== 1983 ===
In 1983, KCSM-TV was one of a batch of educational-access television stations to experiment with running expanded underwriting announcements and full 30-second commercial TV spots from non-profit organizations. In addition to the U.S. Army, many of its other advertisers were coincidentally set up as non-profit organizations under auto dealer associations like the Northern California Toyota Dealer Association, and franchise organizations such as the California Milk Advisory Board and the McDonald's "Golden Arches Advertising Fund". As such, CMC was able to include commercials for these organizations on the otherwise non-commercial, educational, KCSM. This revenue allowed the show to remain profitable, when other local music video shows were struggling to remain on the air or even on non commercial Public-access television.

=== 1984 ===
In 1984, the demand from CMC advertisers grew beyond the scope of underwriting announcements and non profit 30s. On October 1, 1984, the California Music Channel debuted its Monday to Friday broadcast on full power independent KTSF-TV where CMC remained through February 23, 2018.

=== 2016 ===
In 2016 and 2018, Nielsen Media Research encodes, samples, and reports the San Francisco DMA transmissions of CMC as local broadcast TV station CMC-TV and CMC-USA as station CMCU-TV.

=== 2018 ===
In 2018, CMC Broadcasting purchased KTVJ-LD channel 6 licensed to Nampa/Boise, Idaho from OMI.

=== 2019 ===
In 2019, Gracenote and other television listing services classified CMC and CMC-USA as Digital Broadcast Networks.

"Cruisin' with Chuy" launched on October 6. Hosted by Chuy Gomez, the program is CMC's take on the long-standing Bay Area tradition of "Sunday Night Oldies." The live broadcast features fan requests and shout outs via social media platforms, giveaways, and all the best classic hits from 6 pm to 10 pm on every Sunday night.

=== 2021 ===
In 2021, construction began on KTVJ-LD RF 6 Virtual 3 serving Boise-Nampa-Meridian, Idaho. KTVJ signed on the air on November 5, 2021. KTVJ carries digital broadcast networks theDove on 3.1, Newsmax 2 on 3.2, and CMC sister network, CMC-USA, on 3.3.

CMC partnered with Amagi for worldwide digital distribution, Dynamic Ad Insertion, and FAST channel applications and platforms.

== Format ==
The California Music Channel music video format is Hot AC and CHR/Rhythmic. The concept is "radio with pictures" - music video shows are broadcast live, and announcers interact directly with viewers by telephone and e-mail, including requests, contests, and birthday greetings.

CMC owns and operates KTVJ-LD Boise, and programs KKPM-CD 28.3 Chico/Sacramento and its twelve satellite stations. CMC Broadcasting also owns CMC-USA Country Music Channel which is broadcast on .3 on KTVJ as well as the KKPM-CD stations. Both CMC California Music Channel and CMC-USA Country Music Channel are simulcast live on CMC websites, mobile app, and CTV Over-the-top media services via Apple TV, Amazon Fire TV, and Roku. Prior to this, CMC operated three full-time video music channels for MobiTV, including "CMC California Music Channel", "CMC Beat Lounge", and "CMC-USA Country Music Channel".

== Broadcast affiliates ==
KCSM-TV: 1983–1984
KTSF: 1984–2018
KXTV: 1986–1987
KVIQ: 1986–1987
KNSO: 1996–1997
KTNC: 1996–2001 (Country Music Channel)
KCNZ-CD: 2015–2018
KKPM-CD: 2017–present
KTVJ-LD: 2021

== CMC DJs ==
1985: Big Tom Parker from KFRC simulcasting in AM stereo 610 KFRC.
1986: Modern Rock Five at Five with Steve Masters from KITS Live 105.
1987: Power Thursday with Renel from KMEL.
1988-1992: Gil Ashley.
1992: Mimi Chen from KRQR.
1992: Chuy Gomez from KYLD formerly Wild 107.7 and then from KMEL (Chuy remained as the main personality on CMC today).
1994: Steve Jordan from KSAN at 94.9 FM (now KYLD) and KYCY-FM (now KRZZ) hosting CMC's Country Music Channel.
1994: Trace & Franzen from KMEL.
1997: Sway Calloway from KMEL.

=== Additional CMC personalities ===
Alex Caronfly – 1991
Susan Butler – 1991
Jay Peterson – 1992
Andy Kawanami – 1993
Lipoi Niualiku – 1994
Cynthia Roberts – 1998
Jessica Correos – 2004
Brian Moore ("B-Mo") – 2004
Heather Kant – 2007
Cheryl Zurbano – 2007
Lori Rosales – 2009
Mary Diaz – 2010
Miguel ("Thehomie") – 2010
Nessa – 2010
Mia Amor – 2013
Leslie Stoval – 2013
Arianne – 2014
Rachel Andrade – 2015
Miss Kimmie – 2015
Gabby Diaz – 2016
Angelina Narvaez – 2021
