= Richard Sands =

Richard Sands may refer to:

- Richard Sands (businessman) (born 1950s), American businessman
- Richard Sands (DJ), American radio DJ and program director
- Richard Sands (equestrian) (born 1947), Australian Olympic equestrian
