= Fluffy (band) =

British punk band

- Origin: London, England
- Genres: Punk rock
- Years active: 1994–1998
- Labels: Hut, Virgin, Parkway, The Enclave
- Past members: Amanda E Rootes; Bridgette Jones; Helen Storer; Angie Adams; Pandora Ormsby-Gore

Fluffy were an English punk rock band from London, active between 1994 and 1998. Their most prominent line-up consisted of singer and guitarist Amanda Rootes, guitarist Bridgette Jones, bassist Helen Storer, and drummer Angie Adams. The band recorded several singles, an EP, and a studio album, Black Eye, in 1996.

== History ==
The band formed in 1994 after classmates Amanda Rootes and Angie Adams were inspired by a jazz-blues singer in one of Old Compton Street's gay cafes. They were attending college in London at the time, studying art and design. Guitarist Bridgette Jones did her A levels before joining and the band began rehearsing in Rootes' living room. Fluffy's original bassist was Pandora Ormsby-Gore, but she left the band to become an actress, changing her name to Pandora Colin. Shortly afterwards, Helen Storer left Kingston University to join and the band began recording.

Fluffy's first singles "Hypersonic" and "Husband" (both produced by Mal Campbell and Tony Wilson from Freaks of Desire) were released in 1995. The band frequently played shows in their early days at underground fetish balls and parties, such as at Torture Garden and Submission, and gained attention for their raucous shows, performing barefoot in slip dresses. "Young girls shouldn't be afraid to look feminine…" Rootes told Select. "So many girls are afraid to be girls. Apart from Courtney Love, who's really feminine and uses her sexuality and is a strong woman. I don't think women should dress like boys. That's what's great about PJ Harvey. She was boyish and now she's gone really glam. She looks amazing and she's become an icon: a real woman."

They were signed by Dave Stewart of Eurythmics to the publishing side of his label, Anxious Records. Stewart threw a party for the band's first single, "Hypersonic". Although Fluffy were initially signed to Parkway Records (owned by press agents Phill Savidge and John Best of Savidge and Best), it was not until A&R man Tom Zutaut signed them to a two-album deal with The Enclave/Hut/Virgin that Fluffy gained wider notoriety. The band appeared on the NME's yearly bratbus tour in 1996, along with The Bluetones, The Cardigans, and Heavy Stereo. The band's debut album Black Eye was released in 1996, and the band supported the Foo Fighters on tour. They were the opening act for the Sex Pistols reunion tour of Japan, as well as the Sex Pistols' first reunion show at Finsbury Park.

Fluffy were also the opening band during the European part of Marilyn Manson's 'Anti-Christ Superstar' tour, and toured the US with the Neurotic Outsiders. Their music video for "Black Eye" was shot in New Orleans by Floria Sigismondi, and the making of the video was documented by MTV. Their album Black Eye was produced by Bill Price, who also recorded Never Mind the Bollocks. The band was featured in the magazines: Kerrang, Q, Select, NME, and Melody Maker. They also appeared on the UK television shows The Big Breakfast, Hotel Babylon, and Top of the Pops.

Fluffy finally split in 1998, when Rootes and Storer moved to Los Angeles, California. Rootes went on to form Harlow, who participated in the VH1 reality television show, Bands on the Run. Storer joined Jessicka's band Jack Off Jill in 2000 for their final performance, played in Fireball Ministry and also played bass in Duff McKagan's solo band, Loaded, and then formed Thee Heavenly Music Association with guitarist/producer Dave Hillis. She is a vocalist on the Twilight Singers album, She Loves You, with Mark Lanegan and Greg Dulli. Adams and Jones formed an all-female band called Darling.

== Discography ==
=== Albums ===
- Black Eye (1996), The Enclave

=== EPs ===
- 5 Live (1996), The Enclave

=== Singles ===
- "Hypersonic" (1995), Parkway
- "Husband" (1996), Parkway
- "Husband" (1996), Tim Kerr Records
- "Nothing" (1996), Virgin
- "Husband" (1996), The Enclave
- "Black Eye" promo (1996), The Enclave
- "Scream" promo (1996), The Enclave
- "Hypersonic" promo (1997), The Enclave
- "I Wanna Be Your Lush" (1997), Virgin
