= Showgirls 2: Penny's from Heaven =

2011 film

- Directed by: Rena Riffel
- Written by: Rena Riffel
- Based on: Characters created by Joe Eszterhas
- Produced by: Rena Riffel; Josh Eisenstadt; Ford Austin
- Starring: Rena Riffel; Glenn Plummer; Peter Stickles; Greg Travis; Shelley Michelle; Ford Austin; Jade Paris; Andrew Štefánik
- Cinematography: Rick Stephens
- Edited by: Rena Riffel
- Music by: Rick Whitfield
- Production company: Liquid LYT Productions Rena Riffel Films
- Distributed by: Rena Riffel Films; Wild Eye Releasing
- Release date: December 27, 2011
- Running time: 145 minutes
- Country: United States
- Language: English
- Budget: $30,000

Showgirls 2: Penny's from Heaven is a 2011 American erotic drama film written, produced, edited and directed by Rena Riffel. A sequel to Paul Verhoeven's Showgirls (1995), the film stars Riffel, reprising her role as stripper Penny Slot / Helga, alongside Glenn Plummer, Peter Stickles, Greg Travis, Shelley Michelle, Ford Austin, Jade Paris and Andrew Štefánik. The plot follows Penny as she relocates to Los Angeles to pursue her dream of becoming a dancer on a hit television show.

An early script and Kickstarter fundraising campaign for the project was titled Showgirl, and the script was originally titled Stardancer. The film was released in theatres at midnight film showings, art house theatres, film festivals, and charity non-profit organizations, and also received worldwide distribution on DVD and VOD.

== Plot ==
Penny Slot is a stripper in Las Vegas who aspires to become a professional dancer. She leaves Las Vegas to pursue her dream of joining the television dance competition Stardancer in Los Angeles. While hitchhiking to the city, she is robbed of her suitcase and left stranded.

As she continues her journey, Penny witnesses a prostitute murdering a pimp. In an altercation, Penny inadvertently kills the prostitute in self-defense. To avoid suspicion, she assumes the alias "Helga" and resumes her trip to Los Angeles.

Along the way, Penny meets an aspiring violinist named Godhart Brandt, who seduces her with promises of employment. However, she soon discovers that he is engaged to another woman. Godhart later deceives Penny into working as an escort for a wealthy count, whom she initially believes is romantically interested in her. Distressed upon realizing she has been tricked, Penny initially refuses to continue working as a prostitute but later agrees in exchange for backstage access to Stardancer.

Meanwhile, Godhart's fiancée, Katya, takes an interest in Penny and begins training her in ballet. The two develop a romantic relationship and share an intimate encounter. Katya helps Penny secure an audition for Stardancer, and Penny engages in an orgy with a network executive to improve her chances.

Penny ultimately lands a spot on the show, only to learn that Godhart orchestrated the entire sequence of events, including her various sexual encounters, and now demands a percentage of her earnings. In defiance, Penny shoots him in the shoulder, but he continues to assert control over her career.

As Penny gains prominence on Stardancer, Katya grows envious of her success. Convinced that she is aging out of the entertainment industry, Katya persuades Penny to leave Los Angeles with her and relocate to San Francisco, where Penny returns to stripping.

Meanwhile, a detective investigating the murder Penny was involved in finds her lipstick and a business card at the crime scene. He eventually tracks her down, arrests her, and takes her back to Las Vegas to face charges. She is imprisoned but released after six months.

Upon her release, Penny resumes hitchhiking, this time aiming for Broadway. However, she is picked up by the same man who robbed her at the beginning of her journey, and they drive off together.

== Cast ==
- Rena Riffel as Penny Slot / Helga
- Glenn Plummer as Jimmy Smith
- Greg Travis as Phil
- Dewey Weber as Jeffrey
- Peter Stickles as Godhardt Brandt
- Ford Austin as Mr. Von Brausen
- Blanca Blanco as Mrs. Von Brausen
- Hoyt Richards as Detective John Clayburn
- Marc Wasserman as Daryl Smith, Hollywood Producer
- Dylan Vox as Rocco
- Steve Williams as Franky
- Ted Alderman as Daryl
- Chae Amando as Domonique
- Nomi Madness as Sebastian
- Clinton H. Wallace as Sammy Davis
- MYC Agnew as Vladamir Von Der Hoertberg
- Brad Kilmer as Caesar Stardust
- Amber Dawn Lee as Dominique, The Executive
- Maria Marini as Madame Sarah Bright
- Bradley Laise as Mister Rainbow
- Benjamin Ramirez as Magnolia Silver
- Lotti Pharriss Knowles as Gladys, Homeless Showgirl
- John V. Knowles as Diggs, Homeless Showboy
- Chris Saranchock as Al, Strip Club Boss
- Brooke Mason as "Sapphire", The Secretary
- Shelley Michelle as Katya Vardiova
- Paula Labaredes as Maria Strauss
- Andrew Štefánik as "Sexy Boy"
- Elissa Dowling as "Ultra Vixen"
- Lenora Claire as "Emerald"
- Jade Paris as Karen
- DeeDee Bigelow as Gloria
- Erin Affourtit as Tammy
- Sherill Turner as "Sugar"
- Karen Agnes as "Cupcake"
- Christa Bormann as Jenny
- Holly Fraser as "Uber-Nanna"
- Ayesha Orange as Uta
- Kristin Campbell-Taylor as Gerda
- Christy Cody as Bertha
- Julia Sandberg Hansson as Julia, The Mask Dancer

== Critical reception ==
Dallas Observer, "While S2: PFH is not exactly a feminist statement (though that would make a swell pull-quote, wouldn’t it? “Not Exactly a Feminist Statement!”–The Village Voice), the act of Riffel making it was. All that said, S2: PFH is an absolute mess on a technical level. That budget was in the neighborhood of $30,000, and it doesn't feel like a penny (ahem) of that made it onto the screen.

LA Weekly, "With intentionally ridiculous dialogue (“You're not dumb. You're just playing dumb.” “Like a possum?” “No, a possum plays dead.”) and seventies porn production values, Showgirls 2 – Penny's From Heaven is a romp through a warped world of manipulative characters and cruel, competitive dancers."
