= Please Do Not Fight =

Indie rock band from Redwood City, California, USA

- Origin: Redwood City, California, USA
- Genres: Indie Rock
- Years active: 2007–2011
- Members: Zen Zenith, Geoff McCann, Chris Carmichael, Kyle Albery
- Past members: Erin Keely Whitworth, Kubes
- Website: www.pleasedonotfight.com

Please Do Not Fight is an American indie rock band from Redwood City, California. Reviewers have noted a sound similar to Death Cab for Cutie or Matt and Kim.

In 2008, Please Do Not Fight was a finalist for the opening of Not So Silent Night (a San Francisco-area holiday show produced by Live 105).

In 2010, the band began hosting (and performing at) a monthly Open Mic Night in Redwood city.

In 2011, the band created a series of all-ages shows known as "The Rock Hop"

== Discography ==
- Leave it All Behind (2007)
- Move (2009)
- pastpresentfuture Part 1 (2011)
