= Salesian College Preparatory =

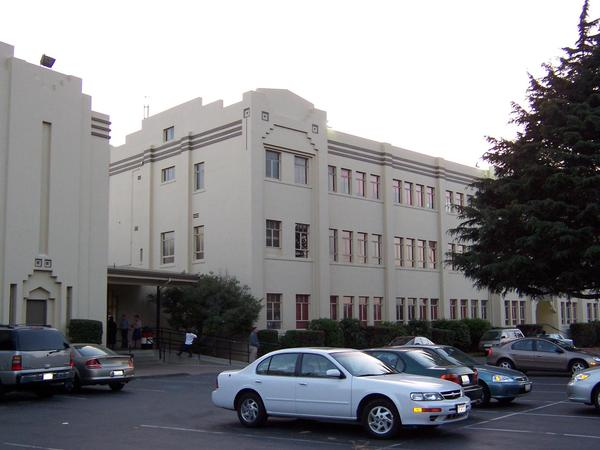

Location
- 2851 Salesian Avenue; Richmond, California 94804; United States; 37.9531°N 122.341°W

Information
- Former names: Salesian High School; Salesian House of Studies
- Type: Private, college-preparatory high school
- Motto: Academics. Faith. Family.
- Religious affiliation: Roman Catholic
- Patron saint: John Bosco
- Established: 1927
- Oversight: Salesians of Don Bosco; Roman Catholic Diocese of Oakland
- NCES School ID: 00074695
- Principal: Kenneth Farr II
- Teaching staff: 33.3 (on an FTE basis)
- Grades: 9–12
- Gender: Co-educational
- Enrollment: 417 (2015–2016)
- Student to teacher ratio: 12.5
- Campus size: 21 acres (8.5 ha)
- Campus type: Suburban
- Colors: Crimson, black, white
- Athletics conference: CIF North Coast Section
- Nickname: Pride
- Accreditation: Western Association of Schools and Colleges
- Newspaper: The Salesian Sentinel
- Website: www.salesian.com

Salesian College Preparatory (formerly Salesian High School and Salesian House of Studies) is a private, Roman Catholic, co-educational, college-preparatory high school in Richmond, California, United States. Established in 1927, it is part of the Salesians of Don Bosco and is located in the Roman Catholic Diocese of Oakland.

It is a Salesian school and is situated on 21 acres (8.5 ha) in the North & East neighborhood. It has rivalries with St. Patrick-St. Vincent High School and Saint Mary's College High School.

== History ==
The Salesian House of Studies opened on the campus as a seminary for future Salesians. In 1960, the school became Salesian High School and began allowing boys of west Contra Costa County to attend.

In 2006, the school changed its mascot from the Chieftain to the Pride, amid nationwide controversy over the use of Native American related mascots in athletics. In 2013, the school began using iPads instead of textbooks for some classwork.

In 2014, on the 50th anniversary of its first graduating class, the school changed its name to Salesian College Preparatory. It was also named the "best faith-based high school" by Parents' Press magazine.

=== Charitable works ===
Since 1991, the school has held an annual golf tournament fundraiser at the Richmond Country Club to support disadvantaged students.

In 2015, the school raised funds to help Middletown High School after the town was devastated by the Valley Fire. Salesian also received an anonymous $250,000 donation to update the science lab for STEM studies.

=== Sexual abuse ===
As part of a larger sexual abuse scandal in the Salesian order in 2006, two instances of sexual abuse occurring between 1969 and 1979 at Salesian High School (now Salesian College Preparatory) resulted in a large settlement for one victim and a jury award to another. In late 2019 after a year-long investigation CNN reported that the Salesian order shifted around pedophile priests from the then Salesian High School for decades and pressured and intimidated victims.

== Notable alumni ==
- James Akinjo, basketball player in the Israeli Basketball Premier League
- Jahvid Best, Olympic athlete, NFL player
- Jabari Bird, NBA player
- Jabari Brown, NBA player
- Russ Critchfield, professional basketball player
- Mike Dirnt, musician, songwriter, and singer (transferred to Pinole Valley High School)
- Angel Jackson, professional basketball player
- Kamil Loud, professional NFL football player
- Rick Stuart, radio disc jockey
- Gene Taylor, professional NFL football player
- Cecilia Vega, 60 Minutes correspondent
