= Thee Heavenly Music Association =

American band

- Origin: Los Angeles, California, U.S.
- Genres: Noise pop, shoegaze, indie rock
- Years active: 2001–present
- Labels: Rehash, Fierce Panda
- Members: Helen Storer; Dave Hillis; Dave Krusen
- Past members: Bardi Martin

Thee Heavenly Music Association was formed by producer and engineer Dave Hillis and Helen Storer (noted for her role in London all-girl punk band Fluffy). Storer is also known for performing live shows with Fireball Ministry and Duff McKagen's solo band Loaded.

Hillis, who is best known for engineering Pearl Jam's Ten LP, Temple of the Dog, Alice in Chains' Would? and Sap EPs, as well as songs on Cameron Crowe's Singles soundtrack and a Dennis Leary HBO Special, recorded and engineered the project, later becoming an integral part of the band himself. Hillis is also a respected recording artist and had a recording contract with Island Records for his band Sybil Vane. He engineered The Afghan Whigs farewell record 1965 and also co-produced the record's single "66".

Musicians used for the heavily Psychedelic based album Shaping the Invisible, included bassist Bardi Martin from Candlebox and drummer Dave Krusen from Pearl Jam. Shaping the Invisible is the band's first album and its title is taken from a quote by Leonardo da Vinci describing music. The album was released to rave reviews on Rehash Records, and a single was released on Fierce Panda.

== Discography ==
=== Albums ===
- Shaping the Invisible (2004) – Rehash Records

=== Compilations ===
- SHOCK & OAR 2005 Fierce Panda Records
