= Steve Masters (DJ) =

American radio and club DJ

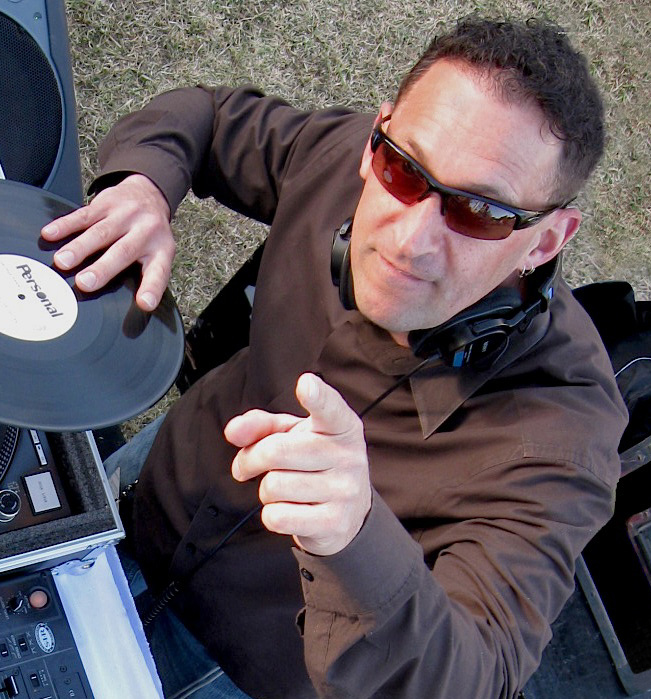
- Steve Masters DJing on Treasure Island in 2009 (photo by Spud)
- Occupations: radio and club DJ

Steve Masters is an American radio and club DJ. He was an MTV VJ in 1991, and has worked for radio stations such as Live 105 San Francisco and Channel 104.9 San Jose. He has also been in Neighborhood Dilemma, a band he formed with his brother Chip and friend Harvey Sherman and also featuring friend Stevie Heger, and started his own record label, Tripindicular Records. Masters arrived at KITS a few years prior to the station's flip in October 1986 from "Hot Hits" to "Modern Rock." He hosted the night show and became very popular in the Bay Area before leaving in 1995 to work at Way-Cool Music, owned and operated by the record label MCA.

During his time at Live 105, Masters advanced in the programming department, working with Program Director Richard Sands, as the team crafted the station's most successful Arbitron ratings period, as Live 105 was consistently one of the top ranked stations in the 18-34 demographics, as documented in Radio & Records and Billboard. Masters is credited by music industry professionals as finding several songs for his new music show "Transmitter Adjustments" that went on to become national hits in the Alternative radio format. One example is "Creep" by Radiohead in 1993.

Masters has resurfaced on Bay Area radio over the years and has continued to craft radio promotions. Steve Masters is regarded as a Bay Area radio legend, due to the extraordinary number of artists he helped gain airplay at Live 105 in the 1980s and 1990s. Now Steve Masters is heard on 73 radio stations across America on a feature called GotGame, a program he created which updates listeners on developments in the video game industry. Masters is also Editor in Chief of the show's web site.

Steve Masters returned to KITS Live 105 in April 2013 to host the 6-9 AM morning show "Masters In The Morning" and was employed there until December 19, 2013.
