= Hibernia Beach LIVE =

- Genre: Talk radio
- Running time: 2-3 hours
- Country of origin: United States
- Language: English
- Home station: KITS
- Hosted by: Ken McPherson; Renée Rotten
- Created by: Ken McPherson
- Recording studio: San Francisco, California
- Original release: October 1989 – 2000
- Opening theme: "Hibernia Beach", Pansy Division

Hibernia Beach LIVE was a gay-themed call-in talk radio show broadcast on San Francisco, California rock radio station KITS "Live 105" from October 1989 to 2000. The program was named after "Hibernia Beach" in San Francisco's Castro neighborhood.

According to host Ken McPherson, "Hibernia Beach began because of a fight between GLAAD and the station..."

While it ran, the program was billed as "the longest-running gay-hosted show on commercial radio", and had an audience of over 40,000 listeners as of 1998. It was broadcast weekly from 11:00 p.m. on Sundays until 2:00 a.m. on Monday mornings; airtimes were later pushed back by an hour, to midnight Sunday nights.

On-air hosts included Ken McPherson (jokingly referred to on air as "America's favorite homosexual"), Geraldine Barr, Renée Rotten, and Ben Carlson. The show was initially formatted as a gay and lesbian public affairs program, but later changed to be inclusive of a broader audience; topics included queer issues, politics, music, relationships, and sexuality.

In 1996, the rock band Pansy Division recorded "Hibernia Beach," a new 40-second opening theme song for the program.
