= Jacqueline Briskin =

British-born American writer

Jacqueline Orgell Briskin
- Born: Jacqueline Orgell; 18 December 1927; London, England
- Died: 24 December 2014 (aged 87)
- Occupation: Novelist
- Spouse: Bertram Norman Briskin (1948-2004)
- Children: 3
- Writing career
- Pen name: Jacqueline Briskin
- Language: English
- Period: 1970-1995
- Genre: Historical fiction

Jacqueline Briskin, née Orgell (18 December 1927 – 24 December 2014) was a British-born American writer specializing in historical fiction from 1970 to 1995. Her books regularly appear on the New York Times bestseller's list. She was a main Selection of the Literary Guild and Doubleday Book Club seven times, her novels were translated into 26 languages, and has sold 23,000,000 copies worldwide.

Her husband Bert Briskin was her agent, and one of her sons is Richard Sands.

== Biography ==
Briskin was born Jacqueline Orgell on 18 December 1927 in London, England, the daughter of Marjorie and Spencer Orgell. In 1938, her family moved to the United States, and she naturalized in 1944. She attended Beverly Hills High School in Beverly Hills, California and graduated in 1945.

On 9 May 1948, she married Bertram Norman "Bert" Briskin, born 17 February 1922. Her husband was an oil executive, who years later became her agent. They had three children: Ralph Louis Briskin, Elizabeth Ann Briskin, and Richard Paul Briskin (alias Richard Sands). Her husband died of Alzheimers on 16 July 2004.

Briskin sold her first novel in 1970, after which she published 11 other historical novels.

== Bibliography ==
=== Single novels ===
- California Generation (1970) - about life in the tumultuous 1960s
- After love (1974)
- Decade (1981)
- Everything and More (1983)
- Too Much Too Soon (1985)
- Dreams Are Not Enough (1987) - about the movie business
- The Naked Heart (1989) - about World War II
- The Other Side of Love (1991) - about World War II
- The Crimson Palace (1995)

=== Van Vliet Family ===
- Rich Friends (1976)
- Paloverde (1978)
- The Onyx (1982)
