= Showgirls =

1995 erotic drama film by Paul Verhoeven

- Theatrical release poster
- Directed by: Paul Verhoeven
- Written by: Joe Eszterhas
- Produced by: Alan Marshall; Charles Evans; Mario Kassar
- Starring: Elizabeth Berkley; Kyle MacLachlan; Gina Gershon; Glenn Plummer; Robert Davi; Alan Rachins; Gina Ravera
- Cinematography: Jost Vacano
- Edited by: Mark Goldblatt; Mark Helfrich
- Music by: David A. Stewart
- Production companies: Carolco Pictures; Chargeurs
- Distributed by: MGM/UA Distribution Co. (through United Artists) (United States); AMLF (France)
- Release dates: September 22, 1995 (United States); January 10, 1996 (France)
- Running time: 131 minutes
- Countries: United States; France
- Language: English
- Budget: $40–$45 million
- Box office: $37.8 million

Showgirls is a 1995 erotic drama film directed by Paul Verhoeven, written by Joe Eszterhas, starring Elizabeth Berkley, Kyle MacLachlan, Gina Gershon, Glenn Plummer, Robert Davi, Alan Rachins, and Gina Ravera. The film focuses on an ambitious young woman hitching a ride to Las Vegas to pursue her dreams of being a professional dancer and showgirl.

Produced on a then-sizable budget of around $45 million, significant controversy and hype surrounding the amounts of sex and nudity in the film preceded its theatrical release. In the United States, it was rated NC-17 for "nudity and erotic sexuality throughout, some graphic language, and sexual violence." Showgirls was the first (and to date only) NC-17 film to be given a wide release in mainstream theaters. Distributor Metro-Goldwyn-Mayer (MGM) dispatched several hundred staffers to theaters across North America playing Showgirls to ensure that patrons would not sneak into the theater from other films, and to make sure filmgoers were over the age of 17. Audience restriction due to the NC-17 rating, coupled with poor reviews, resulted in the film becoming a box-office bomb, grossing just $37.8 million against a budget of $45 million.

Despite a negative theatrical and critical consensus, Showgirls enjoyed success on the home video/VHS market, generating more than $100 million from video sales, allowing the film to make a profit. Since its video release, Showgirls has gone on to become one of MGM's top twenty all-time bestsellers. For its home video release, Verhoeven prepared an R-rated edition for rental outlets that could not (or would not) carry NC-17 films. The R-rated edit runs about three minutes shorter, omitting some footage deemed to be more graphic. This version was later also available on television networks, such as HBO and In Demand (pay-per-view).

Showgirls was universally panned upon its cinematic release and is still consistently ranked as one of the worst films of all time. In the 21st century, it has come to be regarded as a cult film, with a dedicated fanbase; Showgirls has also been subject to critical re-evaluation, with some notable directors and critics considering it a serious satire worthy of praise.

== Plot ==
Young drifter Nomi Malone hitchhikes to Las Vegas, where she aspires to make it as a showgirl. When her driver gets suggestive, she pulls a knife on him. After the man who picked her up robs her, Nomi meets Molly Abrams, a young professional in the Las Vegas entertainment industry; Molly ultimately takes Nomi in as a roommate. To make ends meet, Nomi begins poledancing and stripping at Cheetah's Gentleman's Club, run by Al Torres. Molly invites Nomi to visit her at work, backstage at the Stardust Resort and Casino, where she is a seamstress and costume designer for Goddess, the Stardust's traditional Vegas-style, topless dance revue. While there, Nomi meets Cristal Connors, the lead female of the Goddess cast. While making small talk, Nomi tells Cristal she dances at Cheetah's; Cristal derisively says what she does is akin to "prostitution". Upset, Nomi refuses to go to work at Cheetah's that night; she and Molly go dancing at the Crave Club. Nomi then starts a fight with James Smith, a bouncer at Crave, and is subsequently arrested. Later, she pays James little mind when he bails her out of jail.

Cristal and her boyfriend, Zack Carey (the entertainment director at the Stardust Casino), visit Cheetah's to see what Nomi does, with the two requesting a lap dance from her. Although the bisexual Cristal is attracted to her, the lap dance request is based more on a desire to humiliate Nomi, by insinuating that she truly does engage in a form of prostitution. Reluctantly, after Cristal offers her $500, Nomi performs the requested lap dance. James, the bouncer at Crave, who happens to be at Cheetah's that night, gets a peek at Nomi's lap dance; the next day, he visits Nomi's trailer, suggesting, yet again, that what she is doing is no different than prostitution. James choreographs a new dance routine for Nomi, but then wants to have sex with her in exchange; when Nomi refuses, James gives the role to Penny – a former co-worker of Nomi's.

Later, Cristal arranges for Nomi to audition for the chorus line of Goddess. Tony Moss, the show's director, humiliates Nomi, asking her to rub ice cubes on her nipples to harden them for the topless audition. Furious, Nomi abruptly leaves the audition after scattering ice everywhere, in a fit. Despite her audition, Nomi gets the job and subsequently quits Cheetah's. Cristal then further humiliates Nomi, suggesting that she should make a 'goodwill appearance' at a boat 'trade show', which turns out to be a thinly-disguised prostitution/sex trafficking set-up. The chance to be Cristal's understudy comes up after she hurts herself. Undeterred, Nomi seeks revenge against Cristal by claiming her role in Goddess. She seduces Cristal's boyfriend, Zack, who then secures an audition for Nomi to be Cristal's understudy. Nomi wins the role, but when Cristal threatens legal action against the Stardust, the offer is rescinded. After Cristal taunts her even more, Nomi snaps and pushes Cristal down a flight of stairs, causing her to break her hip. Only after the injury is Cristal officially replaced by Nomi as the show's lead. Despite having finally secured the fame she sought, Nomi is disillusioned. She further alienates her roommate and friend Molly, who realizes Nomi caused the hip injury.

Molly later relents and attends Nomi's opening-night celebration at a lavish hotel, where she meets her idol, musician Andrew Carver. Carver lures her to a room, where he brutally beats her before he and his two security-guard friends proceed to gang-rape her to the point of hospitalization. Nomi finds out and immediately wants to call the police. Zack explains that the Stardust will bribe Molly with hush money to protect Carver (one of their star performers), before then explaining about Nomi's 'sordid' past: Zack discovered (thanks to Phil) that "Nomi" was born Polly Ann Costello in San Francisco, from which she ran away at age 15 to work as a prostitute after her parents' murder–suicide in 1989. After escaping from a foster home in nearby Oakland, California, the following year, Polly changed her name several times. She was also, Zack says, arrested several times in several states for various crimes ranging from drug possession and exchanging sex for money to assault with a deadly weapon. Zack blackmails Polly (Nomi), vowing to conceal her past as long as she agrees not to report the rape and assault. In response, she spits in his face.

Unable to obtain justice for Molly without exposing her own dubious past, Nomi decides to take matters into her own hands. After brutally attacking Carver alone in his hotel room, Nomi then makes two hospital visits: the first being to inform a semi-conscious but recovering Molly that Carver's actions did not go unpunished, and the second, to Cristal, apologizing for pushing her down the stairs and injuring her. Because Cristal wasn't pressing charges against Nomi and her lawyers had secured a large cash settlement, she forgives Nomi. Cristal admits that she attempted a similar stunt years earlier; they exchange a reconciliatory, slightly romantic kiss. Nomi leaves Las Vegas and hitches a ride to Los Angeles, coincidentally with the same man who previously robbed her on her way to Vegas; she subsequently holds him at knifepoint again, demanding the return of her suitcase as they leave Las Vegas.

== Cast ==
- Elizabeth Berkley as Nomi Malone / Polly Ann Costello
- Kyle MacLachlan as Zack Carey
- Gina Gershon as Cristal Connors / Chrissie Lou Connors
- Glenn Plummer as James Smith
- Robert Davi as Al Torres
- Alan Rachins as Tony Moss
- Gina Ravera as Molly Abrams
- Lin Tucci as Henrietta "Mama" Bazoom
- Greg Travis as Phil Newkirk
- Al Ruscio as Sam Karlman
- Patrick Bristow as Marty Jacobsen
- William Shockley as Andrew Carver
- Michelle Johnston as Gay Carpenter
- Dewey Weber as Jeff
- Rena Riffel as Penny / Hope
- Melissa Williams as Julie
- Ungela Brockman as Annie
- Melinda Songer as Nikki
- Jim Ishida as Mr. Okida
- Bobbie Phillips as Dee
- Carrie Ann Inaba as a Goddess Dancer

== Production ==
=== Writing ===
Joe Eszterhas came up with the idea for Showgirls while on vacation at his home in Maui, Hawaii. During lunch in Beverly Hills, Paul Verhoeven told Eszterhas that he had always loved "big MGM musicals", and wanted to make one; Eszterhas suggested the setting of Las Vegas. Based on the idea he scribbled on a napkin, Eszterhas was advanced $2 million to write the script and picked up an additional $1.7 million when the studio produced it into a film. This, along with the scripts for both Verhoeven's previous film, Basic Instinct (1992), and Phillip Noyce's Sliver (1993, also an erotic thriller starring Sharon Stone), made Eszterhas the highest-paid screenwriter in Hollywood history. Because of conflicts with the MPAA over the rating of Basic Instinct, which he made cuts to in order to secure an R rating, Verhoeven planned for Showgirls to be rated NC-17. Verhoeven deferred 70% of his $6 million director's fee depending on if the film turned a profit.

At the time the script deal was announced, Eszterhas was quoted as saying the story for the film "begins in the world of erotic dancers, lap dancers, table dancers, strippers and sleaze. It moves into the world of big hotel showgirls, billboards and glamor. It examines the sleaze and glamor and asks the audience at the end to make its own moral conclusions."

Eszterhas completed the script in the later half of 1993. He later said, "I wrote Showgirls at the single most turbulent moment of my life," referring to the dissolution of his first marriage. "The stuff I've done since then has more warmth, more humor, is more upbeat."

Eszterhas and Verhoeven interviewed over 200 Las Vegas strippers and incorporated parts of their stories into the screenplay to show the amount of exploitation of strippers in Vegas.

Prince was reported to be writing songs for the film.

=== Casting ===
Before Elizabeth Berkley was cast as Nomi Malone, a long list of actresses were considered for the role, including Pamela Anderson, Drew Barrymore, Angelina Jolie, Vanessa Marcil, Jenny McCarthy, Denise Richards, Elisa Donovan, Jennifer Lopez, and Charlize Theron. On the role of Nomi, Verhoeven said, "One of the main concerns, next to acting, was the dancing and nudity – both of those elements being extreme. The actress would have to be able to dance. And she also had to be willing to show full-frontal throughout the film. These elements, especially the nudity, are extremely difficult for American actresses to accept. And Elizabeth Berkley was the only actress that combined all three."

Madonna and Sharon Stone were considered for the part of Cristal Connors before Gina Gershon was cast.

Kyle MacLachlan said Dylan McDermott was the first choice for the character of Zack Carey, but he declined and MacLachlan was then cast. MacLachlan recalled: "That was a decision that was sort of a tough one to make, but I was enchanted with Paul Verhoeven. Particularly RoboCop, which I loved ... It was Verhoeven and Eszterhas, and it seemed like it was going to be kind of dark and edgy and disturbing and real."

=== Filming ===
Verhoeven asked Dave Stewart of the Eurythmics to not only compose the film's score, but to also write the music for the big Stardust hotel shows. "The idea was to make the same loud, sleazy, bad music that you hear in those Vegas shows, because that's how it actually is," said Verhoeven.

Gina Ravera said the filming of the rape scene was traumatic. "When you do a scene like that, your body doesn't know it's not real," she said of the sequence, which took over nine hours to film. Ravera also said that Verhoeven's drive for realism and "very exbuberant" direction to the male actors in the scene made them "overzealous" in their playing of it, and that William Shockley's on-screen punch had actually connected, saying, "My jaw was not right for years. It can go too far, [and] it went too far." Ravera added that she was left "just covered in bruises after [the scene] because of what was asked for the camera."

== Music ==
The soundtrack of the film featured songs specially composed for the film, including an early version of David Bowie's "I'm Afraid of Americans", and a song of Siouxsie and the Banshees' "New Skin" recorded near Prague in June 1995. It also includes songs by Killing Joke and Scylla (a then-new band featuring Curve's singer Toni Halliday). The Young Gods' song "Kissing the Sun" only appeared on the American edition of the soundtrack and did not feature on the European and Japanese releases. The soundtrack album was released on September 26, 1995.

Showgirls

Soundtrack album by Various artists
- Released: September 26, 1995
- Recorded: 1994–1995
- Genres: Rock, pop, industrial
- Length: 63:13
- Label: Interscope/Atlantic
- Producers: Various; for album: Paul Verhoeven (executive producer), Robin Green (music supervisor), Alan Marshall (producer for Vegas Productions)

Music from and Inspired by Showgirls
No.	Title	Writer(s)	Artist	Length
1.	"Animal"	Kevin McMahon	Prick	4:09
2.	"I'm Afraid of Americans"	David Bowie (lyrics and music), Brian Eno (music)	David Bowie	5:12
3.	"Kissing the Sun"	F. Treichler	The Young Gods	4:31
4.	"New Skin"	Siouxsie Sioux	Siouxsie and the Banshees	5:36
5.	"Wasted Time"	My Life with the Thrill Kill Kult	My Life with the Thrill Kill Kult	3:55
6.	"Emergency's About to End"	Rob Zabrecky	Possum Dixon	2:37
7.	"You Can Do It"	Gwen Stefani, Eric Stefani, Tom Dumont, Tony Kanal	No Doubt	4:14
8.	"Purely Sexuel"	Xavier	Xavier	4:01
9.	"Hollywood Babylon"	Killing Joke	Killing Joke	6:44
10.	"Beast Inside"	Thomas/Campbell/Wilson	Freaks of Desire	5:43
11.	"Helen's Face"	T. Halliday, A. Moulder	Scylla	4:56
12.	"Somebody New"	My Life with the Thrill Kill Kult	My Life with the Thrill Kill Kult	2:37
13.	"Goddess"	David A. Stewart	David A. Stewart	3:27
14.	"Walk into the Wind"	David A. Stewart, Terry Hall	"Andrew Carver" (character in film; vocals performed by Buggsy Pearce)	5:37

== Marketing ==
The NC-17 rating limited the film's marketing opportunities in traditional outlets: of the major American broadcast television networks, ABC, CBS, and Fox did not air ads for the film before 10:00 p.m., and many NBC stations did not advertise it at all. As a consequence, MGM/UA largely relied on the controversy over the rating itself to generate audience hype, and mounted a promotional blitz that capitalized on the film's potentially lurid subject matter. Ads bore the tagline "leave your inhibitions at the door." The promotion included billboards in Times Square and Venice Beach, an interactive adults-only website, and circulation of a "sneak preview" videotape at rental stores, which featured eight minutes of explicit footage not shown in theatrical trailers. The studio said they distributed 300,000 preview tapes, though it was not carried in Blockbuster stores, as the preview was also rated NC-17.

Emphasizing the film's sexual content, MGM/UA targeted young men as a key audience, placing ads for the film in the sports sections of newspapers. Eszterhas objected to this tactic, and took out a full-page advertisement in Variety where he insisted the film was a morality tale. The ad said, "The movie shows that dancers in Vegas are often victimized, humiliated, used, verbally and physically raped by the men who are at the power centers of that world." Eszterhas, who believed the film's message to be about the moral costs of the pursuit of stardom, urged teens under the age of 17 to sneak into the theater by using fake IDs, prompting censure from MPAA president Jack Valenti.

The film's stark poster was adapted from a photograph by Tono Stano. The photo had originally been featured on the cover of the 1994 book The Body: Photographs of the Human Form.

== Release ==
=== Box office ===
The film was released to 1,388 theaters in North America on September 22, 1995. Two theater chains in the South, Texas' Cinemark and Georgia's Carmike, declined to screen the film. On its opening weekend, the film made $8,112,627 and opened in the number two spot behind Seven. In the second week, it slipped to the fifth spot and grosses fell 60%. Its total domestic take was $20,350,754, less than half of its $45 million budget.

While the film's theatrical run was underwhelming and did not recoup its budget, it went on to gross over $100 million in the home-video and rentals markets, and as of 2014, the film is still one of MGM's highest-selling movies.

To date, Showgirls is the second highest-grossing NC-17 production (after Last Tango in Paris), earning $20,350,754 at the North American box office.

=== Home media ===
Showgirls performed much better on VHS, DVD, and Blu-ray, becoming one of MGM's top 20 best-sellers, grossing over $100 million in the US home media market alone. Though initially reluctant to edit the film for video release, Verhoeven had agreed to recut Showgirls as an R-rated version, which allowed MGM to recoup its budget through video sales and rentals. On January 2, 1996, Showgirls was released on VHS in two versions: A director's R-rated version for rental outlets (including Blockbuster and Hollywood Video), and an NC-17-rated version (which two versions of the 1996 VHS release of the film were not available exclusively through Warner Home Video). The NC-17 version was also released on LaserDisc that year.

Showgirls was released on DVD for the first time on April 25, 2000. In 2004, MGM released the "V.I.P. Edition" on DVD in a special boxed set containing two shot glasses, movie cards with drinking games on the back, a deck of playing cards, and a nude poster of Berkley with a pair of suction-cup pasties so viewers can play "pin the pasties on the showgirl". In 2007, MGM re-released the V.I.P. Edition DVD without the physical extras, as the "Fully Exposed Edition".

On June 15, 2010, MGM released a 15th Anniversary "Sinsational Edition" in a two-disc dual-format Blu-ray/DVD edition.

In 2016, Showgirls was restored in 4K from the original negative. The image restoration was carried out by the Technicolor laboratory and the sound restoration by the L.E. Diapason laboratory, under the supervision of Paul Verhoeven and Pathé. The restored version was released on Blu-ray following a theatrical run.

The film was released in Germany on Ultra HD Blu-ray by Capelight Pictures in 2020, based on Pathé's restoration, which was noted for having high noise reduction. It was released on Ultra HD Blu-ray in the United States by Vinegar Syndrome in 2023, which received a stronger review for picture quality by High-Def Digest. Vinegar Syndrome launched a disc replacement program shortly after discovering sync issues in the film's 5.1 audio track.

== Reception ==
=== Critical reception ===
The film was mostly panned on its initial release. Critics bemoaned the film's lack of eroticism and described the film's heavy degree of nudity as exploitative and demeaning to women. In the Los Angeles Times, Kenneth Turan wrote the film "has somehow managed to make extensive nudity exquisitely boring" and "descends into incoherent tedium." He added, "Though the filmmakers' incessant talk about vision, artistry and honest self-expression lead one to expect a sexually explicit biopic about the Dalai Lama, what is in fact provided is depressing and disappointing as well as dehumanizing."

Richard Corliss of Time wrote, "Eszterhas must be great at pitching stories, because the screenwriting craft eludes him. A mild gag here--the mispronouncing of Gianni Versace's name--is tortured into an endless motif. Nomi has a clouded past, but that doesn't explain why she is such a gratingly annoying creature." Owen Gleiberman of Entertainment Weekly wrote, "The exploitative heart of Showgirls is that Eszterhas and Verhoeven effectively dissolve the line between the way men in the strip world treat women and the way the movie treats them. Most of the male characters are misogynistic louts, and even the few sympathetic ones are borderline ridiculous."

The character of Nomi was widely panned as unsympathetic and "irritating". Rita Kempley of The Washington Post wrote, "Like the bimbo she plays, Berkley's minimal acting talent limits her choice of roles. That makes the filmmakers little better than the club owners who prostitute their employees. They're selling women's bodies, and Showgirls is an overcoat movie for men who don't want to be seen going into a porno theater."

In a review that awarded the film 2 stars out of 4, Roger Ebert lambasted the film's over-the-top nudity and "juvenile" script, maintaining that the movie "contains no true eroticism". However, he wrote "the production values are first-rate, and the lead performance by newcomer Elizabeth Berkley has a fierce energy that's always interesting." He also found some of the plot lines concerning the backstabbing between the dancers entertaining, saying, "It's trash, yes, but not boring". In a 1998 review, he stated the film received "some bad reviews, but it wasn't completely terrible".

In her review in The New York Times, Janet Maslin wrote, "the strain of trying to make America's dirtiest big-studio movie has led Mr. Verhoeven and Mr. Ezsterhas to create an instant camp classic". Writing for the San Francisco Chronicle, Edward Guthmann noted, "From all the bad press that Showgirls has gotten, you'd think the nation's critics had never witnessed high-gloss trash before. Granted, Paul Verhoeven's tale of a Las Vegas lap dancer is one of Hollywood's all-time stinkers, but it does come from a long and healthy tradition – the trashy, backstage show-biz epic", referring to films like The Oscar and Valley of the Dolls.

Stanley Kauffmann was one of the few critics to give a positive review in The New Republic. He commented, "What matters much more than the story or the Spicy Stuff is the dancing, the show-biz dancing. It's electric. Exciting." Kauffman praised Berkley's performance and commented, "Besides her dancing sizzle, she does what she can with the mechanically viperous character she was given to play. Sarah Bernhardt couldn't have done much more with this robotic part, and couldn't have done the dancing." He also complimented Ravera and Gershon. He concluded the film shows "that: (a) under the glitz, Las Vegas is a tacky, tricky place; and (b) Las Vegas is a microcosm of American values at their shabbiest. If you don't think you can survive the shock of these insights, be warned."

In The New Yorker, Anthony Lane said, "Berkley's acting début is a joy, if you can call it acting: she jumps up and down a lot to indicate excitement. Watching this picture is like surfing the soaps for a couple of hours. There's no use being offended, so you might as well have a good laugh."

On the review aggregator website Rotten Tomatoes, the film holds an approval rating of 24% based on 82 reviews, with an average rating of 3.8/10. The website's critics consensus reads, "Vile, contemptible, garish, and misogynistic – and that might just be exactly Showgirls' point." Metacritic assigned the film a weighted average score of 25 out of 100, based on 21 critics, indicating "generally unfavorable reviews". Audiences polled by CinemaScore gave the film an average grade of "C" on an A+ to F scale.

=== Cast and crew ===
MacLachlan recalled seeing the film for the first time at the premiere:

I was absolutely gobsmacked. I said, "This is horrible. Horrible!" And it's a very slow, sinking feeling when you're watching the movie, and the first scene comes out, and you're like, "Oh, that's a really bad scene." But you say, "Well, that's okay, the next one'll be better." And you somehow try to convince yourself that it's going to get better… and it just gets worse. And I was like, "Wow. That was crazy." I mean, I really didn't see that coming. So at that point, I distanced myself from the movie. Now, of course, it has a whole other life as a sort of inadvertent… satire. No, "satire" isn't the right word. But it's inadvertently funny. So it's found its place. It provides entertainment, though not in the way I think it was originally intended. It was just… maybe the wrong material with the wrong director and the wrong cast.

Due to Showgirls' poor reception, Striptease, a 1996 film about nude dancers starring Demi Moore, was distanced from Showgirls in advertisements. Elizabeth Berkley was dropped by her agent Mike Menchel following the film's release. Other agents refused to take her telephone calls. In 2013, she also said the film's critical reception made her stop dancing.

In 1997, Eszterhas said:

Clearly we made mistakes. Clearly it was one of the biggest failures of our time. It failed commercially, critically, it failed on videotape, it failed internationally. ... In retrospect, part of it was that Paul and I were coming off of Basic, which defied the critics and was a huge success. Maybe there was a certain hubris involved: "We can do what we want to do, go as far out there as we want." That rape scene was a god-awful mistake. In retrospect, a terrible mistake. And musically it was eminently forgettable. And in casting mistakes were made.

In a 2025 Far Out article, Verhoeven lamented Showgirls' impact on Berkley's career, stating: "It made my life more difficult, but not to the degree it did Elizabeth's. Hollywood turned their backs on her." Regarding her performance, he stated: "If somebody has to be blamed, it should be me because I thought that it was interesting to portray somebody like that. I asked Elizabeth to do all that. To be abrupt and to act in that way, but people have been attacking her about for that [sic] ever since. I had hoped the end of the movie would explain why she acted that way, when it's revealed she has convictions linked with drugs. But that too turned out to be a big mistake." In the same article, writer Jacob Simmons reflected on the backlash by stating, "Berkley's performance might not have been perfect, but attacks on her appearance were completely unwarranted."

== Awards ==
The film was the winner of a then-record seven 1995 Golden Raspberry Awards (from a record 13 nominations, a record that still stands) including Worst Picture, Worst Actress (Elizabeth Berkley), Worst Director (Paul Verhoeven), Worst Screenplay (Joe Eszterhas), Worst New Star (Elizabeth Berkley), Worst Screen Couple ("any combination of two people (or two body parts)") and Worst Original Song ("Walk Into the Wind" originally written by David A. Stewart and Terry Hall in 1992, covered in the film by main antagonist Andrew Carver). Verhoeven appeared in person at the Razzies ceremony to accept his award for Worst Director.

Showgirls would later win an eighth Razzie Award for Worst Picture of the Last Decade in 2000. It was soon tied with Battlefield Earth for winning the most Razzies in a single year, a record broken in 2008 when I Know Who Killed Me won eight trophies and again in 2012 when Jack and Jill won 10 awards.

At the 1995 Stinkers Bad Movie Awards, the film received three nominations: Worst Picture, Worst Actor for MacLachlan, and Worst Actress for Berkley. Of the three, its only win was for Worst Picture.

Award	Category	Recipient	Result
Dallas–Fort Worth Film Critics Association Awards	Worst Film		Won
Golden Raspberry Awards (1995)	Worst Picture	Alan Marshall and Charles Evans	Won
Golden Raspberry Awards (1995)	Worst Director	Paul Verhoeven	Won
Golden Raspberry Awards (1995)	Worst Actor	Kyle MacLachlan	Nominated
Golden Raspberry Awards (1995)	Worst Actress	Elizabeth Berkley	Won
Golden Raspberry Awards (1995)	Worst Supporting Actor	Robert Davi	Nominated
Golden Raspberry Awards (1995)	Worst Supporting Actor	Alan Rachins	Nominated
Golden Raspberry Awards (1995)	Worst Supporting Actress	Gina Gershon	Nominated
Golden Raspberry Awards (1995)	Worst Supporting Actress	Lin Tucci	Nominated
Golden Raspberry Awards (1995)	Worst Screenplay	Joe Eszterhas	Won
Golden Raspberry Awards (1995)	Worst Screen Couple	Any combination of two people (or two body parts!)	Won
Golden Raspberry Awards (1995)	Worst New Star	Elizabeth Berkley	Won
Golden Raspberry Awards (1995)	Worst Original Song	"Walk into the Wind" – David A. Stewart and Terry Hall (Covered in the film by the main antagonist Andrew Carver)	Won
Golden Raspberry Awards (1995)	Worst Remake or Sequel	Remake of both All About Eve and The Lonely Lady	Nominated
Golden Raspberry Awards (1999)	Worst Picture of the Decade		Won
Golden Raspberry Awards (1999)	Worst Actress of the Century	Elizabeth Berkley	Nominated
Golden Raspberry Awards (1999)	Worst New Star of the Decade	Elizabeth Berkley	Nominated
Golden Raspberry Awards (2004)	Worst "Drama" of Our First 25 Years		Nominated
Satellite Awards	Best DVD Extras	Showgirls (for the packaging)	Nominated
Stinkers Bad Movie Awards	Worst Picture	Alan Marshall and Charles Evans	Won
Stinkers Bad Movie Awards	Worst Actor	Kyle MacLachlan	Nominated
Stinkers Bad Movie Awards	Worst Actress	Elizabeth Berkley	Nominated

== Cult status ==
Showgirls has achieved cult status. According to writer Naomi Klein, ironic enjoyment of the film initially arose among those with the video before MGM capitalized on the idea. MGM noticed the video was performing well because "trendy twenty-somethings were throwing Showgirls irony parties, laughing sardonically at the implausibly poor screenplay and shrieking with horror at the aerobic sexual encounters". The film was heavily embraced by the LGBT community, who would host midnight movie-type screenings that became an ongoing tradition. Movie screenings and viewing parties were hosted by performers such as Betty Buckley, Peaches Christ, and David Schmader. The screenings were akin to midnight shows of The Rocky Horror Picture Show, with audiences being given instructions to interact or sing along with scenes. To coincide with the film's video release and its popularity in the gay community, MGM recruited drag performers to host midnight screenings in New York City in 1996, and later held screenings in Los Angeles. Home video rentals would go on to generate more than $100 million, making Showgirls one of MGM's top 20 all-time bestsellers.

Verhoeven accepted the film's unexpected cult status, saying "Maybe this kind of ritualistic cult popularity isn't what I intended, but it's like a resurrection after the crucifixion." Eszterhas, however, maintains that the humor was intentional: "What Paul [Verhoeven] and I had in mind was something darkly funny. We went through the script line by line, and we were really laughing at some of it. I defy people to tell me that a line like, 'How does it feel not to have anybody coming on you anymore' isn't meant to be funny."

The term "Showgirls-bad" has been adopted by film critics and fans to refer to films considered guilty pleasures, or "so-bad-they're-good", and the film has been heralded as a camp classic in the vein of films like Beyond the Valley of the Dolls.

In Ireland, the film was banned on November 8, 1995. The Irish Film Censor Board chair Sheamus Smith provided no explanation for the ban, but it had been speculated that the ban was owed to the film's rape scene. In fact, Smith banned the film upon initial release because of the line, "I got bigger tits than the fuckin' Virgin Mary and I got a bigger mouth, too." Smith's objection was specifically to the diction "fuckin' Virgin Mary". The film was passed uncut for its video release on October 23, 2017.

The rights to show the film on television were eventually purchased by the VH1 network. Because of the film's frequent nudity, though, a censored version was created with black bras and panties digitally rendered to hide all exposed breasts and genitalia. Also, several scenes were removed entirely, shortening the movie by at least 45 minutes. Berkley refused to redub her lines because MGM refused to pay her fee of $250, so a noticeably different actress's voice can be heard on the soundtrack.

In 2003, the film was ranked number 36 on Entertainment Weekly's 'The Top 50 Cult Movies' list.

The film was mentioned a few times on hit network TV shows in the late 1990s, with a mix of affection and sarcasm. On NBC's NewsRadio, a running joke where billionaire WNYX owner Jimmy James has a running list of potential wives made a reference to Showgirls when James is asked by station manager Dave Nelson about the wives' list. James then says it is one number shorter than previously noted because "You know that nice girl who was on Saved by the Bell? She went and made a dirty movie!" In a Season 11 episode of The Simpsons, Homer and Marge go out on a date night to see the film after Bart becomes well-behaved from taking Focusyn. The scene playing was a fictional scene where a redheaded man tells Nomi that she's wasting her talent as a showgirl, with Nomi snapping, "Screw you! Screw everybody!" and takes her top off when the stage manager calls for showtime. Marge also comments that she enjoys the friendship between "showgirl [Nomi] and that seamstress [Molly]".

Australian rapper Iggy Azalea paid homage to the film in the music video for her 2013 song "Change Your Life" featuring T.I. Many visuals and costumes were recreated or inspired by the film, including the Cheetah's club setting.

In 2019, You Don't Nomi, a documentary re-examining the film's legacy, was released.

On March 20, 2024, the Academy Museum held a screening of Showgirls in Los Angeles, with an introduction by Berkley who received three standing ovations by the sold out audience.

=== Critical re-evaluation ===
Critics such as Jonathan Rosenbaum and J. Hoberman, as well as filmmakers Jim Jarmusch, Adam McKay and Jacques Rivette, have gone on the record defending Showgirls as a serious satire. In a 1998 interview, Rivette called it "one of the great American films of the last few years", though "very unpleasant: it's about surviving in a world populated by assholes, and that's Verhoeven's philosophy". Quentin Tarantino has stated that he enjoyed Showgirls, referring to it in 1996 as the "only ... other time in the last twenty years [that] a major studio made a full-on, gigantic, big-budget exploitation movie", comparing it to Mandingo.

Showgirls has been compared to the 1950 film All About Eve as a remake, update, or rip-off of that film. For Rosenbaum, "Showgirls has to be one of the most vitriolic allegories about Hollywood and selling out ever made". "Verhoeven may be the bravest and most assured satirist in Hollywood, insofar as he succeeds in making big genre movies no one knows whether to take seriously or not", wrote Michael Atkinson.

In Slant's four-out-of-four-star review, Eric Henderson rejected the "so-bad-it's-good" interpretation and lauds the film as "one of the most honest satires of recent years", stating that the film targets Hollywood's "morally bankrupt star-is-born tales." Henderson drew from a 2003 round-table discussion in Film Quarterly in which others argued its merits. Noël Burch attests that the film "takes mass culture seriously, as a site of both fascination and struggle" and uses melodrama as "an excellent vehicle for social criticism." In the same round-table, Chon Noriega suggests that the film has been misinterpreted and the satire overlooked because "the film lacks the usual coordinates and signposts for a critique of human vice and folly provided by sarcasm, irony, and caustic wit."

Berkley's performance, which was heavily criticized as out of sync with the rest of the film's tone, was also reappraised. In 2015, Verhoeven said Berkley had unfairly taken on the bulk of criticism against the film and claimed responsibility for her performance. "Good or not good, I was the one who asked her to exaggerate everything – every move – because that was the element of style that I thought would work for the movie," he said. In 2020, Hugh Montgomery of the BBC described Berkley's portrayal as "the definition of a star turn: absolutely singular, and charged with a haywire electricity", adding, "It benefits from the meta-authenticity that comes from a young entertainer pulling out all the stops for her shot at the big time, playing a young entertainer pulling out all the stops for her shot at the big time. But above and beyond that, it is an exhilaratingly surreal and abrasive performance, in which gestures and expressions are exaggerated to an inhuman level". Critic Catherine Bray said, "You can't criticise the performance for not being realistic. That's like looking at an Andy Warhol and going 'well those colours aren't true to life. It's a pop-art caricature'".

The violence of the gang rape scene has generated criticism and debate, with some describing it as being in poor taste and unnecessarily brutal because it happens to the film's prominent woman of color and serves mainly as a catalyst for Nomi's moral arc. Jeffrey McHale, the director of You Don't Nomi, opined, "It's completely offensive. I think it's not really necessary… [Verhoeven] used Molly's brutalisation as a way for Nomi to find herself and I think that's disgusting."

The film continues to generate critical discussion about its themes and commentary on patriarchal culture, the American dream, and the nature of sex work, with some contending that the film's many exaggerated aspects – its gaudy dance numbers, excessive nudity, laughable dialogue, and over-the-top acting – are all deliberately part of the film's intent. In 2020, The Guardian commented: "With Showgirls, the target was the American dream itself – and the dishonest 'star is born' narratives churned out to sustain it."

In 2024, The Year's Work in Showgirls Studies was published by Indiana University Press. Editors Melissa Hardie, Meaghan Morris, and Kane Race collected historical interpretations as well as a series of essays that reconsidered the film in terms of its critical and cult reception, theories of acting, gender, and sexuality, the material circumstances of sex work and other contexts.

== Legacy ==
=== Sequel ===
Verhoeven said a sequel had been in development before Showgirls was released, with the film's final scene of a sign for Los Angeles hinting at a plot where Nomi takes on Hollywood. However, these plans were dropped when the film did poorly at the box office.

A sequel focusing on minor character Penny was released in 2011. Titled Showgirls 2: Penny's from Heaven, it was written, produced, edited, directed by and starred Rena Riffel, who was the only character returning, apart from cameos by Glenn Plummer and Greg Travis.

=== Musical adaptation ===
In 2013, an off-off-Broadway parody called Showgirls! The Musical was mounted by Bob and Tobly McSmith of Medium Face Productions. Originating at the Kraine Theater in New York City, critical and audience response was overwhelmingly positive. It was moved to a 200-seat off-Broadway theater, XL Nightclub. The production continued to be successful; its original run was extended through July 15, 2013. Actress Rena Riffel reprised her role in the film as Penny for one month of the production.

The musical closely mimics the film's plot and often directly incorporates dialog. The original off-Broadway production was critically lauded for April Kidwell's performance as Nomi and for staying true to the source's campy nature. Andy Webster of The New York Times stated: "The coltish April Kidwell, as Nomi, is a wonder. Amid an exhausting onslaught of often obvious ribaldry, she is tireless, fearless, and performing circles around Elizabeth Berkley's portrayal in the movie. Her vibrant physicality and knowing humor are a potent riposte to the story's rabid misogyny."

It takes several characters and condenses them for the stage. The characters of Marty and Gaye have been combined to one character, simply called 'Gay'. The characters of Molly and James are both portrayed by actor Marcus Deison. Zack Carey is simply called Kyle MacLachlan. With sexually explicit language and nudity throughout, the tagline is "Singing. Dancing. Tits".

The original cast featured Kidwell as Nomi, Rori Nogee as Cristal, John E. Elliott as Kyle McLachlan, Marcus Deison as Molly and James, Philip McLeod as Gay and Amanda Nicholas, Natalie Wagner and Israel Vinas as the ensemble.

Original cast recording

On June 11, 2013, a cast recording was released with eight tracks.

All tracks are written by Bob and Tobly McSmith.

No.	Title	Length
1.	"Fucking Underwater"	2:42
2.	"Boat Show"	5:19
3.	"The Whorrior"	3:39
4.	"Different Places (The Dead Hooker Song)"	2:08
5.	"Dancing Ain't Fucking, Girl"	2:13
6.	"You're a Whore, Darlin'"	2:45
7.	"The Best Friend Song"	2:50
8.	"Don't Lick That Pole, Girl"	2:42

== See also ==
- List of cult films
- List of films set in Las Vegas
- List of films considered the worst
- Nudity in film
- Striptease
- You Don't Nomi

== Bibliography ==
- Eszterhas, Joe (2004). Hollywood Animal: A Memoir. New York: Knopf. ISBN 978-0375413551.
- Hendy, Elizabeth (2022). ""Nomi Malone is what Las Vegas is all about!": Phallic women in Showgirls". Frames Cinema Journal. 20: 161–174. doi:10.15664/fcj.v20i0.2517. S2CID 253650926.
- Henley, Dennis (2016). "The Showgirl Must Go On". In Barton-Fumo, Margaret (ed.). Paul Verhoeven: Interviews. Univ. Press of Mississippi. pp. 104–120. ISBN 978-1496810182.
- Parish, James Robert (2006). Fiasco – A History of Hollywood's Iconic Flops. Hoboken, New Jersey: John Wiley & Sons. ISBN 978-0-471-69159-4.
- Smith, William (April 22, 2021). "Different Places! Real and Hyperreal Las Vegas in Showgirls". Mediapolis. 6 (2).
