= Florida Film Critics Circle Award for Best Documentary Film =

Annual US film award

The Florida Film Critics Circle Award for Best Documentary is an award given by the Florida Film Critics Circle to honor the finest achievements in filmmaking.

== Winners ==
=== 1990s ===
Year	Winner	Director(s)
1997	Fast, Cheap & Out of Control	Errol Morris
1999	Buena Vista Social Club	Wim Wenders

=== 2000s ===
Year	Winner	Director(s)
2000	The Life and Times of Hank Greenberg	Aviva Kempner
2001	Startup.com	Chris Hegedus and Jehane Noujaim
2002	Bowling for Columbine	Michael Moore
2003	Capturing the Friedmans	Andrew Jarecki
2004	Fahrenheit 9/11	Michael Moore
2005	Grizzly Man	Werner Herzog
2006	An Inconvenient Truth	Davis Guggenheim
2007	No End in Sight	Charles Ferguson
2008	Man on Wire	James Marsh
2009	The Cove	Louie Psihoyos

=== 2010s ===
Year	Winner	Director(s)
2010	The Tillman Story	Amir Bar-Lev
2011	Project Nim	James Marsh
2012	The Queen of Versailles	Lauren Greenfield
2013	The Act of Killing	Joshua Oppenheimer
2014	Life Itself	Steve James
2015	Amy	Asif Kapadia
2016	Cameraperson	Kirsten Johnson
2017	Jane	Brett Morgen
2018	Shirkers	Sandi Tan
2019	Apollo 11	Todd Douglas Miller

=== 2020s ===
Year	Winner	Director(s)
2020	You Don't Nomi	Jeffrey McHale
2021	Summer of Soul (...Or, When the Revolution Could Not Be Televised)	Questlove
2022	All the Beauty and the Bloodshed	Laura Poitras
2023	Menus-Plaisirs – Les Troisgros	Frederick Wiseman
2024	Soundtrack to a Coup d'Etat	Johan Grimonprez
