= Sexual abuse scandal in the Salesian order =

Catholic sex abuse case

The sexual abuse scandal in the Salesian Order is a major chapter in the series of Catholic sex abuse cases in various Western jurisdictions.

== Abuse in Australia ==
In Australia, there are allegations that the Salesians moved a priest convicted of abuse in Melbourne to Samoa to avoid further police investigation and charges.

In August 2008, the Salesian head in Australia, Fr Frank Moloney SDB, apologised to victims of a former priest Paul Evans convicted of a series of offences. Evans was a Salesian priest when the offences occurred at Boys' Town in Sydney in the 1980s. He was legally and canonically removed from the Order in 1991.

There have been a number of convictions related to sexual abuse by teachers and priests at the school, particularly in regard to offences committed in the 1970s and 80s, including: Michael Aulsebrook, gaoled for the sexual abuse of a 12-year-old student in 1983; Peter Paul van Ruth, who was sentenced to 28 months gaol in 2011 for indecently assaulting two 12-year-old boys; and Frank Klep, a former principal of the college who "...was convicted in 1994 of four charges of sexual assault relating to incidents during the 1970s."

Other priests from the college reached settlements with substantial compensation payments paid to their victims, over allegations of sexual abuse, but were not otherwise convicted, while Father Jack Ayers, a teacher and gardener at the school, was moved to Samoa after accusations were made against him.

== Abuse in Belgium ==
In 2007, a Belgian criminal court convicted Willem VC, a laicised Salesian priest, to four years imprisonment for sexual delinquency with multiple adolescent minors. During the criminal investigation by the police and judiciary previous acts of sexual delinquency were discovered that occurred during his membership of the Salesian congregation. He was expelled from this order in 2001 for these incidents.

Father Luk Delft was convicted for child abuse and possession of child pornography in 2012 and was ordered by the court to not have contact with minors until 2022 and a suspended prison sentence of 18 months. Reporting by CNN revealed that the Salesian order of Belgium was aware of the convictions and of problems with Delft's behavior dating back as far as 2001 How a Catholic order dedicated to protecting children failed them when it he confessed he had molested two boys in a Don Bosco school in Zwijnaarde. He was transferred to another Don Bosco school, this time in Woluwe-Saint-Pierre, without the police being informed. There, child pornography was found on his computer in 2009 and he is asked to leave the school. Later, a former colleague will inform the police, which will lead to his 2012 conviction. Despite this conviction, he was able to travel to the Central African Republic (CAR) in 2013 to work in a leading role for the catholic NGO Caritas in the country, with the knowledge of the Salesian order and the probation committee in Belgium. In 2019 CNN reporters confronted Delft with new accusations of child abuse in a refugee camp of CAR. He is then sent back to Belgium by Salesian superior Father Carlo Loots. Caritas denied knowing about Delft's pedophilia. Father Loots said to CNN that the Salesians were “naive” to send Delft to the CAR: “It’s a little bit cynical, probably, to give him a new opportunity and that posting at Kaga-Bandoro and (to expect) that the Bishop of Kaga-Bandoro would take responsibility for him.” The Bishop of Kaga-Bandoro at that time, Albert Vanbuel, was himself a Belgian Salesian.

== Abuse in Italy ==
Don Gabriele Corsani

Paolo Malini e Don Nicolò Migliorini

On December 20, 2019, Maria Angela Fare, a former Italian nun of the Sisters of Don Bosco, was sentenced to three and a half years facing jail for sexual abuse of a girl she met in the oratory. The girl later died by suicide in 2011.

== Abuse in the Netherlands ==
In February 2010 the Salesians were accused of sexual abuse in their juvenate Don Rua in 's-Heerenberg. Salesian bishop of Rotterdam van Luyn pleaded for a thorough investigation.

== Allegations of Abuse in the United States ==
In 2002, it was alleged that the leaders chose to keep quiet when confronted with allegations of abuse.

In 2006, the Dallas Morning News reported that the leaders of the Salesians of Don Bosco based in San Francisco had moved priests accused of child sexual abuse from country to country, away from law enforcement and victims. This included Rev. Frank Klep, who was allegedly moved to the Pacific island of Samoa in 1998 while he was under criminal investigation in Australia. During the same year, two instances of sexual abuse occurring between 1969 and 1979 at Salesian High School (now Salesian College Preparatory) in Richmond, California, resulted in a large settlement for one victim and a jury award to another.

In 2012, the Oblates of St Francis de Sales of the Wilmington/ Philadelphia Province, an Order that is separate and distinct from the Salesians of Don Bosco, published an open letter of contrition and healing over activities in 2004 in Wilmington, Delaware.

=== Eastern United States ===
Fr. Francis "Frank" Nugent, SDB Francis Nugent groomed and targeted three siblings in a single-parent household. Father Nugent lavished tens of thousands of the Salesians of Don Bosco's dollars on Patrick, one of seven children of a perennially broke alcoholic single mother, paying for anything he wanted, like a trip to Europe, motel rooms for trysts with his girlfriends and endless beer. In the mid-70's, according to Ms. Gallagher and several of her old friends, Nugent used his position as director of the Salesians' Don Bosco Preparatory High School in Ramsey, New Jersey, to serve as an all-purpose enabler for a group of wayward, mostly poor teenagers from the nearby town of Waldwick, including the Gallaghers. They said he turned a stone house on school property into a sort of Plato's Youth Retreat, stocking it with vast amounts of liquor for parties, encouraging under-age couples to use it as a love nest. At the center of Nugent's circle, Ms. Gallagher said, was her older brother Patrick, who was probably 12 when Nugent met him at a youth camp the priest ran in Ellenville, New York. Ms. Gallagher said that Nugent lavished tens of thousands of the Salesians' dollars on Patrick, one of seven children of a perennially broke alcoholic single mother, paying for anything he wanted, like a trip to Europe, motel rooms for trysts with his girlfriends and endless beer. Susan, four years younger than Patrick, was also on Nugent's A-list. She says he took her shopping often, bought her dinner at fancy restaurants and gave her hundreds of dollars to buy marijuana for herself and her friends, stuffing tightly folded bills into her pants pockets. For Patrick, the price of this largesse was years of sexual abuse, Ms. Gallagher said. When Susan turned 14, she said, Nugent, a short, roly-poly man, started in on her, making her perform oral sex on him. Patrick's older brother, Brendan, 48, who owns a bar and lives in New Orleans, said Nugent molested him once, too. Over time, Ms. Gallagher said, Nugent lost interest in her, but not in Patrick. Eventually, Brendan said, Patrick began pushing Nugent away, but in 1980, while drunk, he drove a car owned by the Salesians into a pond and died. He was 25.

=== Western United States ===
Br. Salvatore Billante, SDB Br. Salvatore Billante pled guilty to sexually abusing a victim and was sentenced to eight years in prison in 1989. Billante abused as many as 25 boys from 1969 to 1989. In 1994, Billante was released from prison and registered as a sex offender. He subsequently left the Salesians of Don Bosco. In 2002, Billante was arrested again for abusing a boy, but the charges were dropped. He was named in a 2003 civil suit and was added to a list of credibly accused priests in the Diocese of Oakland in 2019.

Virendra Coutts, SDB Named publicly as credibly accused in 2019 and listed in the Diocese of Oakland's list of clergy sexual abuse perpetrators, under priests and deacons, without clarifying whether Coutts was a priest or deacon.

Fr. Pablo Cortes, SDB Fr. Pablo Cortes was a Salesian priest from El Salvador and was named publicly as accused by the Diocese of Sacramento on its 2019 list. Cortes worked in the Diocese of Sacramento from 1970 to 1973. In 1990, Cortes was alleged to have sexually abused a girl younger than 14 years of age in 1970.

Fr. Bernard Dabbene, SDB Fr. Bernard Dabbene was ordained a Salesian priest. In 2000, Dabbene was "removed from ministry" after he was arrested for suspected child molestation when he was caught with a minor by a police officer in San Francisco. He was placed on three years’ probation, given 300 hours of community service, required to undergo counseling and avoid minors, and to register as a sex offender. Following six months of treatment, he was sent to the Salesian Provincial Residence in San Francisco where he worked as an Archivist until his death in 2010. In 2002, another survivor came forward alleging child sexual abuse by Dabbene in 1959, while he worked as a teacher and lay brother at Salesian High School in Richmond, California. Dabbene worked with children in multiple parishes for the Archdiocese of Los Angeles including Don Bosco Technical Institute and St. John Bosco High School.

Fr. Titian Miani, SDB In 2008 the Salesian Society of Los Angeles agreed to pay $19.5 million to 17 childhood molestation victims, ending the last unresolved case involving the Los Angeles Archdiocese's sexual abuse crisis. The settlement came after jurors were preparing to hear allegations that the Salesians knew Father Titian Miani been accused of preying on youths when they assigned him to St John Bosco High School in Bellflower, where he allegedly molested four children. After his transfer to Bellflower, he befriended a family whose father had recently died. While the mother was busy at work and night school, Miani would show up at the family home and molest the 15-year-old son and two daughters, the court documents said. Miani left the order in 1974 but continued to serve as a priest until his retirement from clerical duties in 1993.

Br. Danilo Pacheco, SDB Pacheco has appeared in abuse tracking lists. He was accused of molesting minors at two different Catholic high schools in Southern California. He also worked in the Oakland diocese.

Fr. Richard Presenti, SDB Fr. Richard Presenti has been accused of sexual abuse in at least four lawsuits. He's been accused of sexually abusing boys between 1970 and 1973. In 2003, two men sued Presenti and the Saleisans of Don Bosco (aka, the Salesian Society), claiming he had sexually abused them while attending a Salesian boy's camp in Middletown, California in the 1960s and 1970s. In 2005, Presenti admitted in a sworn deposition to abusing two boys by fondling and masturbating them.

Fr. Nicholas "Nick" Reina, SDB One of the highest profile Salesian priests to be credibly accused is Fr. Nicholas "Nick" Reina, who was the highest ranking Salesian priest ("provincial") and leader of the Salesians of Don Bosco, Western Province from 1997 to 2003. Nicholas Reina is accused of abuse that occurred in 2000. The alleged abuse was reported to the Los Angeles Archdiocese in 2018. He was removed from ministry in 2018. In 2018, Nicholas Reina was included in a revised list of accused priests published by the Los Angeles Archdiocese. Nicholas Reina was ordained in 1978 and was "removed from ministry" in 2018.

Fr. John Roche, SDB Fr. John Roche has been accused of sexual abuse in a lawsuit filed in San Francisco on March 18, 2021. Roche held several high-level leadership positions with the Salesians, including director of the Institute for Salesian Studies, vocation director for the Salesian Western Province, and founding director and president of a Salesian-affiliated high school in Watsonville, California.

Fr. Gerald "Gerry" Wertz, SDB Gerry Wertz was included in an updated list of accused priests provided by the Archdiocese of Los Angeles in 2018. A civil suit filed 2/24/2011 accuses Wertz of sexually abusing a 15-year-old boy at St. John Bosco High School in Bellflower 1993–1994. Wertz was a teacher and counselor at the school at the time of the alleged abuse. The boy reported the abuse at the time; Wertz was not disciplined. Wertz is said to be living in 2011 at the Salesian Provincial Residence in San Francisco (1 block away from Cathedral school). Included on the Los Angeles Archdiocese's updated list 12/6/2018, which notes a report to the Archdiocese in 2018 of incident(s) 1993–1994.

Fr. Stephen Whelan, SDB Stephen Whelan was the editor of Salesian Bulletin in 1997. Civil suit filed in 2003 by a man alleging abuse, including rape, by Fr. Whelan when he was a student at Salesian High School (Richmond, California) from 1969 to the early 1970s. Whelan's accuser said Brother Sal Billante, SDB witnessed the abuse and said nothing. Further, the victim-survivor told a counselor and was then chastised and threatened by the school principal. Also, that school administrator Fr. David Purdy, SDB attempted to induce him to commit suicide. Whelan was still active in August 2005. A civil trial began on July 7, 2006. On July 19, 2006, a jury awarded the plaintiff $600,000 in damages. Whelan was removed from his position after the verdict and was moved to the Salesian Order provincial house in San Francisco, California. The Salesians of Don Bosco appealed the ruling and the California Court of Appeals upheld the verdict in August 2008. Whelan was removed from public ministry as a result and was added to the Diocese of Oakland (California)'s list of credibly accused priests in 2019.

Fr. Thomas McGhee, SDB Named publicly in November 2021 by Attorney Jeff Anderson as accused in a lawsuit filed under the New Jersey Victims’ Rights Bill.

== See also ==
- Child abuse
- Child sexual abuse
- Religious abuse
- Roman Catholic sex abuse cases
- Sexual abuse
- Sexual misconduct
