= Rick Stuart =

Rick Stuart (known as Big Rick and 'Cardo Grande) is a Radio DJ in the San Francisco Bay Area. He is currently hosting Sunday afternoons at MyWineRadio.com.

Stations he has previously worked for include KVYN, KFOG (2000 - 2011), Live 105 (1986 - 2000), KNAC, The Quake, and KUSF.

Stuart grew up on the Richmond-El Cerrito border and went to High School at Salesian High School in Richmond. Stuart went on to The University of San Francisco, where his radio career began. He now lives in Napa.
