= Rena Riffel =

American actress (born 1969)

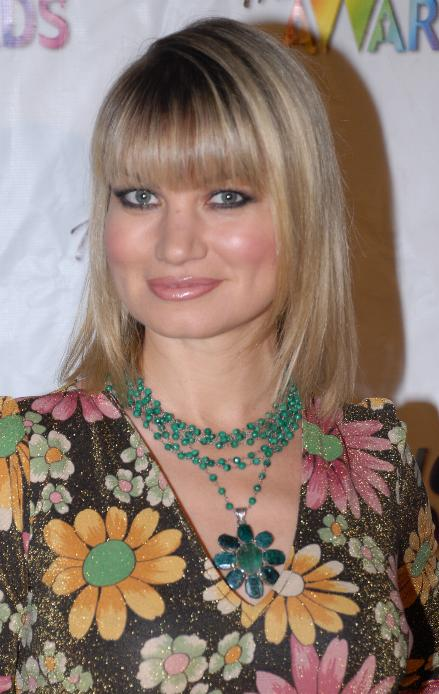
- Rena Riffel at 7th Annual WeHo Awards, 2008
- Born: Rena Lynn Riffel; March 5, 1969 (age 57); Los Angeles, California, United States
- Occupations: Actress; dancer; singer; model; director; producer; writer; composer
- Years active: 1988–present

Rena Riffel (born March 5, 1969) is an American actress, singer, dancer, model, writer, producer, and director. She is known for her supporting roles in films such as Showgirls, Striptease, and Mulholland Drive.

== Career ==
=== Showgirls ===
Riffel landed her breakthrough role in the 1995 film Showgirls starring Elizabeth Berkley, Gina Gershon, and Kyle MacLachlan. Initially reading for the lead role of Cristal Connors, Riffel was cast in the supporting role of Penny/Hope after director Paul Verhoeven decided that she was too young to play an aging showgirl.

While on the set of Showgirls, Riffel approached the music supervisor with a song she recorded, "Deep Kiss". The music supervisor tested the song on the production office (without telling them it had been written by one of the actresses) to determine if it was suitable for the film. Director Paul Verhoeven listened to the song and decided to include it in the lap dance scene at the Cheetah strip club.

Although an initial box office failure, Showgirls enjoyed success in the home video market, generating more than $100 million in video rentals and became one of MGM's top 20 all-time best sellers.

For the 2004 re-release as a DVD limited edition box set, Riffel, along with cast members Lin Tucci and Patrick Bristow, had their hand prints and names put in cement in front of the Hollywood Vista Theater at the red carpet event where they were also interviewed by Access Hollywood. Riffel and Bristow were also special guests at Peaches Christ's Midnight Mass midnight screening of Showgirls in 2008 in San Francisco, California. They were interviewed on stage after the live performance of the Goddess volcano dance performed by drag queens in gold lamé and featuring Peaches Christ as Goddess.

When asked if she expected Showgirls to produce such a cult legacy, Riffel replied, "No. I went into it thinking it would be a really erotic, serious, shocking exposé. People would be sitting on the edge of their seats from suspense. [... But] some people were trying to play straight comedy – I played my character with comedy; I was hoping to get a laugh – but no one was acting with tongue in cheek. I know that everyone went into it thinking it would be like Basic Instinct. [...] Maybe it's Verhoeven. Even [Basic Instinct] seems kind of campy now [...] I think it's something with European filmmakers. I think – and this is my theory – [...] that there's something that European filmmakers have, a punched-up, extreme vibe. Everything's extreme."

She is also quoted as saying, "Showgirls just keeps getting more and more popular, it's a total phenomenon. I don't think a film could even try to have this afterlife happen to it. This cult status and celebration is all created by the fans and the people who saw something special in the film. I seem to be one of the only actors that represents and gets involved with the cult status. I think Elizabeth (Berkley) is still upset about how the film was received initially. I think she is brilliant in her role and she should have won best actress at some film festivals, and I think Joe Eszterhas's writing is remarkably brilliant. I suspect because the way they marketed the film, that is what led to the backlash. The marketing campaign was misleading. But at the end of the day, it all worked out for the best."

=== Striptease ===
Following her role in Showgirls, Riffel was cast in Striptease with Demi Moore and Burt Reynolds. Showgirls was generally disliked and the filmmakers feared people would pre-judge Striptease for that reason. To avoid any association between the two films, advertisements projected Striptease as more comedic than Showgirls, which had been marketed as a drama. Aside from a common context, Striptease and Showgirls shared two notable connections: Marguerite Derricks choreographed both films, and Rena Riffel played a prominent role in each.

=== Mulholland Drive ===
In 2001, Riffel appeared in the David Lynch film Mulholland Drive. When interviewed about the film and if she "got it", Riffel replied, "See...I can't remember. No, I guess it still doesn't make sense to me. It's been a while – I'd like to watch it again....one website put a lot of clarity on it with their theories."

=== Other film and television work ===
After Striptease, Riffel accepted minor roles on the television series Married... with Children in 1997, and Clueless as well as the HBO movie Breast Men before making a string of films with European director Lloyd Simandl, including Dark Confessions, Bound Cargo, Caligula's Spawn, and No Escape. These films, coupled with Riffel's roles in Showgirls and Striptease led to her being cast in a handful of erotic/thriller films such as The Pornographer and Scandalous Behavior (with Shannon Tweed).

In 1999, Riffel appeared in Citizens of Perpetual Indulgence, a gay-themed comedy/drama/art film. Riffel also appeared in several horror/thriller movies including Candyman 3: Day of the Dead, Unstable Minds, and Dark Reel starring Edward Furlong and Tony Todd.

=== Directing ===
In 2008, Riffel directed, produced, wrote, and starred in the film Trasharella, a comedy/crime/fantasy musical. She edited the film herself and her production company, Rena Riffel Films, released the film on DVD through Amazon.com in 2009.

When asked to describe Trasharella, Riffel stated, "It is a satire on B-movie horror films... I went against the grain and instead of trying to make this slick Hollywood film, I just let things be as they were and made it into a really bad grindhouse style exploitation film. ...it's not a dumb film, it's just 'bad'... in a good way. Mae West said: 'When I'm good I'm good, but when I'm bad I'm better.' And we use her quote in Trasharella."

Entertainment Weekly's July 23, 2010 issue announced a sequel to Showgirls. Riffel wrote, directed, and starred in the film. Initially entitled Showgirl, it was later renamed Showgirls 2: Penny's from Heaven. The film had its first screening on October 27, 2011, at the Laemmle Theatre's Sunset 5 in West Hollywood, California. It played to a packed house who enjoyed the epic, which had a duration of 2 hours and 24 minutes. The film received favorable reviews, with references made to David Lynch's Inland Empire by CraveOnline.com and LA Weekly. Showgirls 2: Penny's from Heaven was screened in arthouse theatres across the country and announced further surprise screenings on the movie website, ShowGirls2Movie.com.

Riffel also developed a musical based on Showgirls, titled Showgirls! The Musical.

== Music ==
According to the text trivia track on the 2010 Blu-ray release of Showgirls, one of the songs played during the film's lap-dance sequence was co-written by Riffel.

In 2004, Riffel's song "Geisha Girl" was featured in Oliver Robbins film Wild Roomies. She also sang the theme song for 2007 E! Entertainment's series, Billionaire Heiresses, called "Livin' in the Fast Lane". In 2008, she starred in Coheed and Cambria's music video for "Feathers" playing the 1950s character, Judy Feathers. Judy Feathers is the perfect housewife with a secret of being a cannibal, killing then serving the milkman, postman, sailor, and a boyscout for dinner. It won Best Video in 2008 in the UK for the Kerrang! Awards and Rena appeared on Jimmy Kimmel Live! on March 5, 2008, with the band.

Riffel is featured on the Velvet Revolver album Contraband.

== Filmography ==
=== Film ===
Film performances
Year	Title	Role	Notes
1990	Satan's Princess	Erica Dunn	a.k.a. Malediction (UK video title)
1992	Sinatra	May Britt	Television film
1993	Fishmasters	Bikini Girl	Television film
1994	Art Deco Detective	Julie / Meg Hudson	
1994	Gunmen	Mrs. Loomis	
1995	Undercover Heat	Rain	
1995	Showgirls	Penny / Hope	
1996	Striptease	Tiffany	
1997	Breast Men	Swimming Pool Girl	Television film (HBO)
1998	Dark Confessions	Erica	a.k.a. Chained Heat III: No Holds Barred (UK video title)
1998	Shark in a Bottle	Receptionist	
1998	MP Da Last Don	Dancer	
1999	The Pornographer	Tiffany	
1999	Candyman: Day of the Dead	Lena	a.k.a. Candyman 3: Day of the Dead
1999	Goat on Fire and Smiling Fish	Party Girl #2	a.k.a. Smiling Fish & Goat on Fire (US new title)
1999	Singapore Sling	Michelle Drake	a.k.a. Scandalous Behavior (US)
1999	Citizens of Perpetual Indulgence		Uncredited
2000	Between Christmas and New Year's	Blue	
2001	Mulholland Drive	Laney	
2002	Unstable Minds	Pamela	
2003	Lady Killers	Fantasy Girl	Uncredited; a.k.a. Gold Diggers, National Lampoon's Gold Diggers, National Lampoon's Lady Killers
2003	Bound Cargo	Widow	a.k.a. White Slave Virgins
2003	Welcome to the Real Hollywood	Rena	
2004	Roomies	Female Caller	a.k.a. Wild Roomies (US new title)
2008	One, Two, Many	Tiffany	
2008	Caligula's Spawn	Druscilla	
2008	Dark Reel	Detective LaRue	
2008	No Escape	Brandt	
2009	Trasharella	Trasharella / Helena Beestrom	Also director, producer, writer, and editor
2009	The Making of Gnome Killer 2	Detective LaRue / Gnome Queen	
2009	The Gertrude Stein Mystery	Agent Agnes Goddard	
2010	Sickle	Penny	
2010	Eerie, PA	Condi	
2011	Spreading Darkness	Elle	
2011	Showgirls 2: Penny's from Heaven	Penny Slot / Helga	Also director, producer, writer, and editor
2013	The Trouble with Barry	'Pussy' Johnson	
2016	Astrid's Auto Portrait	Astrid Von Star	Also director, producer, writer, and editor

=== Television ===
Television performances
Year	Title	Role	Notes
1988	Paradise	Teenage Prostitute	Episode: "Childhood's End"; a.k.a. Guns of Paradise
1992	Freshman Dorm	Lisa	Episode: "My Boyfriend's Back"
1995	Land's End	Taffi Bishop	2 episodes
1996	Minor Adjustments	Leslie	Episode: "The Model Wife"
1997	Married... with Children	Stripper #1	Episode: "How to Marry a Moron"
1997	Clueless	Second Masseuse	Episode: "Sharing Cher"
2000	The Pretender	Mona Jeffries	Episode: "Cold Dick"
2000	The X Show	Herself	Episode dated 26 January 2000
2001	Spyder Games	Lydia	2 episodes
2005	Dante's Cove	Tina	2 episodes
2008	Celebrity Rehab with Dr. Drew	Herself	Episode: "Sex and Trauma"

=== Producer ===
- 2000: Between Christmas and New Year's (associate producer)
- 2009: Trasharella
- 2009: The Making of Gnome Killer 2 (associate producer)
- 2009: The Gertrude Stein Mystery (associate producer)
- 2011: Trasharella Ultra Vixen
- 2011: Showgirls 2: Penny's from Heaven
- 2016: Astrid's Auto Portrait

=== Composer ===
- 1992: Back in the USSR
- 1995: Showgirls
- 1999: Bloodthirsty
- 2004: Roomies
- 2009: Trasharella

=== Soundtrack ===
- 1995: Showgirls (writer and performer: "Deep Kiss")
- 2004: Roomies (performer: "Geisha Girl")
- 2007: Forbes 20 Billionaire Heiresses: Young, Fabulous and Incredibly Rich (performer: "Livin' in the Fast Lane" – theme song)
- 2009: Trasharella

=== Director ===
- 2009: Trasharella
- 2011: Trasharella Ultra Vixen
- 2011: Showgirls 2: Penny's from Heaven
- 2016: Astrid's Auto Portrait

=== Writer ===
- 2009: Trasharella (screenplay) (story)
- 2011: Showgirls 2: Penny's from Heaven
- 2016: Astrid's Auto Portrait

=== Editor ===
- 2009: Trasharella
- 2011: Trasharella Ultra Vixen
- 2011: Showgirls 2: Penny's from Heaven
- 2016: Astrid's Auto Portrait
