= Torture Garden (fetish club) =

Fetish club in London, England

Coordinates: 51.5325°N 0.1049°W

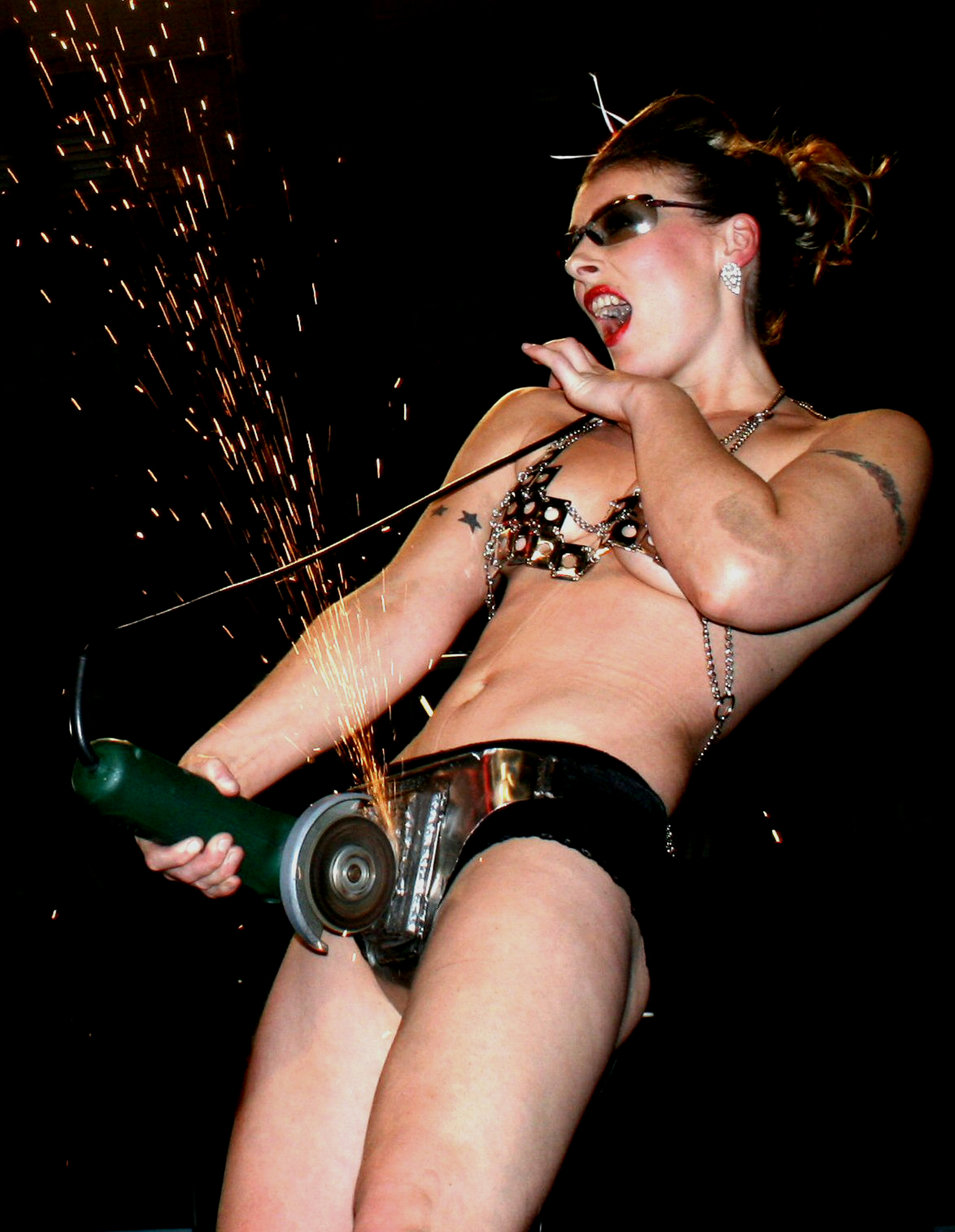
Performer of the club at Olympia Exhibition (2007)

Torture Garden (abbreviated as TG) is a fetish club in London, England. The club started in 1990 and is now Europe's largest fetish club. It features dance floors, musical acts, performance art, fashion shows, a couples room, and a BDSM dungeon.

Initially threatened with closure by the police, it is now described as "legendary" and "a capital institution" by Time Out magazine. It has also been described as "a combination of a fetish, S/M, body art, Modern Primitives, straight, gay, performance art, body ritual, fashion, techno/industrial/atmospheric music, multimedia, and cyberspace club".

It is named for the novel The Torture Garden by Octave Mirabeau.

== Atmosphere ==
The co-founder of TG described the experience as "like entering a scene from a movie", and said that "we are basically about the celebration of sexuality and fantasy in a safe environment". A lack of intimidating or threatening behaviour is characteristic of the club, in contrast to most nightclubs. One journalist reported the "welcoming, liberating, anything-goes atmosphere".

There is a strict dress code: "Fantasy Fetish, SM, Body Art, Drag, Rubber, Leather, PVC goes, but no cotton t-shirts, street wear, or regular club wear". This has been summarised as "if what you’re wearing wouldn’t get you stared at in the street, don’t bother even queuing up to get in".

== Events ==
TG has hosted club nights in several other cities and countries, including Edinburgh, Russia, Greece and Japan, and it also runs a Fetish fashion label. TG ran a live stage show as the centerpiece of the Erotica exhibition at Olympia in 2004, and hosted a night at the Barbican Centre art gallery to coincide with the "Seduced" exhibition.

Rubber Banned, an exhibit of photographs of TG club-goers taken by fashion photographer Perou was shown in London and Paris in 2005.

== Celebrity attenders ==
Jean Paul Gaultier, Boy George, Marc Almond, Marilyn Manson, Dita Von Teese (who had her UK debut at Torture Garden), performance artist Franko B, 90's punk band Fluffy, Bob Carolgees and Jack Dee have all been to TG nights.

== See also ==
- Body modification
- Sexuality and gender identity-based cultures
- Nightclubs
- Performance art
- Sex club
- Sexual fetishism
- Slimelight
