= You Don't Nomi =

2019 documentary film

- Theatrical release poster
- Directed by: Jeffrey McHale
- Edited by: Jeffrey McHale
- Music by: Mark Degli Antoni
- Production companies: Grade Five Films; XYZ Films
- Distributed by: RLJE Films
- Release date: April 27, 2019 (Tribeca Film Festival)
- Running time: 92 minutes
- Country: United States
- Language: English

You Don't Nomi is a 2019 American documentary film that details the history of the 1995 erotic drama film Showgirls. The documentary is directed by Jeffrey McHale and it features the original cast of the film (in archive footage). It premiered on 27 April 2019 at the Tribeca Film Festival, and upon release it was met with positive feedback from the critics. The film was nominated for Ad Hoc Docs Competition category at the Cleveland International Film Festival.

== Cast ==
- Adam Nayman
- April Kidwell
- Barbara Shulgasser
- David Schmader
- Haley Mlotek
- Jeffery Conway
- Jeffrey Sconce
- Matt Baume
- Peaches Christ
- Susan Wloszczyna

== Release ==
On 27 April 2019, You Don't Nomi made its world premiere at the Tribeca Film Festival. It was later screened at the Frameline Film Festival on 27 June 2019, and at the Outfest on 27 July 2019. The film was released in the United States on digital download and DVD on 21 July 2020 by RLJ Entertainment.

=== Critical response ===
On the review aggregator website Rotten Tomatoes, the film holds an approval rating of 89%, based on 83 reviews, with an average rating of 7.1/10. The website's critical consensus reads, "It may not change many minds regarding Showgirls, but You Don't Nomi is a solidly entertaining postmortem of an infamous flop." Metacritic, which uses a weighted average, assigned the film a score of 66 out of 100, based on 17 critics, indicating "generally favorable reviews".

Writing for The Guardian, Peter Bradshaw said that "I'm not sure that this documentary completely nails the movie's [Showgirls] attraction". Owen Gleiberman of Variety wrote "You Don't Nomi takes "Showgirls" seriously, obsessively, looking at it from every angle, presenting a chorus of critical voices who analyze the film in ways that are highly enlightening and provocative". David Rooney of The Hollywood Reporter penned that the film is a "Sweet redemption, whether you like it or not". Peter Travers of Rolling Stone wrote, "You Don't Nomi takes many shots at Hollywood hypocrisy, but scores its most cutting points when it shows instead of tells". Glenn Kenny of RogerEbert.com wrote, "The critical rehabilitation of Paul Verhoeven's 1995 "Showgirls" continues apace with "You Don't Nomi," a documentary that wants to appear inventive but too often comes off as affected". KC Ifeanyi of Fast Company wrote that "You Don't Nomi is thoughtfully constructed cine-essay on how Showgirls evolved into the cult classic we know it as today".

== Awards and nominations ==
Year	Award	Category	Recipient	Result	Ref(s)
2020	Cleveland International Film Festival	Ad Hoc Docs Competition	Jeffrey McHale	Nominated	
2020	Florida Film Critics Circle	Best Documentary Film	You Don't Nomi	Won	
2021	Film Threat Award This!	Award This! Film About Movies or Filmmaking	You Don't Nomi	Won	
