= Aaron Axelsen =

American radio DJ

Aaron Axelsen is an American radio DJ. From 1997 to 2020, he was the music director of San Francisco modern rock station KITS, Live 105.

During its original run, Axelsen hosted two specialty music shows on KITS, Soundcheck—which showcased new and emerging musicians, and the electronic music show Subsonic. Via Soundcheck, Axelsen has been credited with having been the first to play a number of alternative rock and indie pop acts on U.S. commercial radio, including Arcade Fire, Bastille, Coldplay, Lana Del Rey, Billie Eilish, Foster The People, Franz Ferdinand, Imagine Dragons, The Killers, Lorde, Muse, The 1975, Phoenix, The Strokes, and Twenty One Pilots.

He is also the owner and resident DJ at Popscene, a San Francisco club that hosted the first local shows by acts such as The Killers, including the only San Francisco show of Amy Winehouse.

In April 2020, KITS owner Audacy, Inc. laid off Axelsen after 23 years as part of budget cuts tied to the COVID-19 pandemic; the station would ultimately drop its long-running modern rock format in October 2021 in favor of an adult hits format. In June 2023, KITS relaunched its Live 105 format with Axelsen as a consultant, who also revived Soundcheck.
