= Shelley Michelle =

American actress and body double

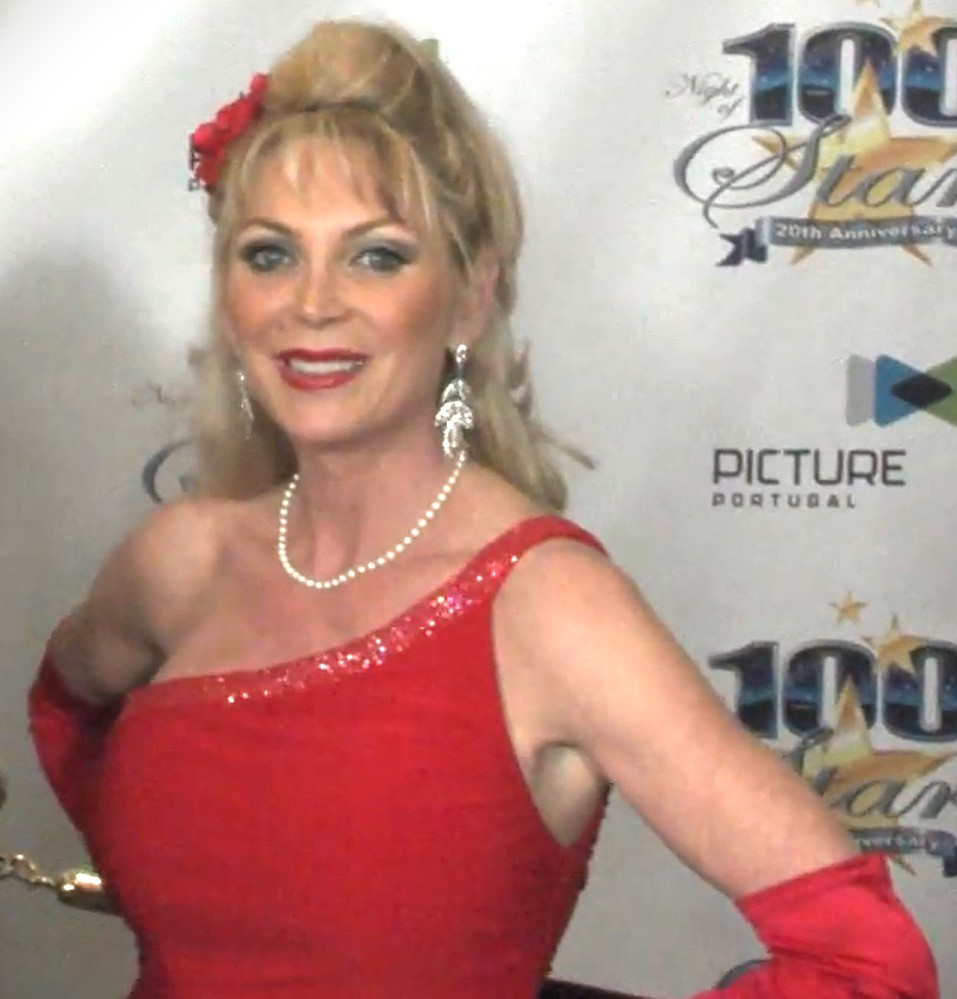
- Michelle in 2011
- Known for: Body double to Hollywood star actresses
- Notable work: Pretty Woman

Shelley Michelle is an American fitness model, actress and has been called "the most famous body double in Hollywood".

== Work ==
She claimed she started as a body double with an introductory scene in the 1988 comedy My Stepmother Is an Alien, substituting for Kim Basinger's character's arms and legs, which Basinger has denied.

She provided the body where the face of lead actress Julia Roberts was superimposed for the poster for the 1990 film Pretty Woman, where she also substituted Roberts in scenes that she considered too risqué.

In 1990, she also doubled for Catherine Oxenberg in Overexposed. Oxenberg is part of the Yugoslavian royal family and would not accept nudes in film.

She also had a small acting role in 1992 film The Naked Truth.

In 2006, she was running her own agency Body Doubles and Parts Inc.

She competed in an episode of "Who Wants to Date a Comedian?" (Joey Medina) in 2011, but didn't get chosen.
