= Freaks of Desire =

English electronic rock band

Freaks of Desire were an electronic rock band from London.

== History ==
Freaks of Desire were formed in Shepherd's Bush, London in 1993. Their unique sound was derived from a diverse set of influences and combined programmed beats and electronic soundscapes with strong melodies and driving distorted guitars. The band quickly came to the attention of Dave Stewart from Eurythmics, who signed them to his label, Anxious Records. The band recorded their debut album with producer Bruce Lampcov at The The's War Room studios in Shoreditch, London. Freaks of Desire quickly built a live following and toured the UK throughout 1994, but quickly grew tired of playing in traditional music venues. Borrowing an old Eurythmics PA, they began playing in clubs such as Smashing, Magick and Fantastic in London and Jackie 60 and Don Hill's in New York City. A live show at Heaven in London was attended by Paul Verhoeven who asked the band to contribute to the soundtrack of his forthcoming movie Showgirls, alongside Prince, David Bowie & Nine Inch Nails. The band recorded a new song 'Beast Inside' for the movie, which they co-produced with Dave Stewart at The Church Studios in London. The track also appeared in the acclaimed Eric Laneuville film Born into Exile. The band completed their debut album with producer Bob Rosa at House of Sound Studios and Electric Lady Studios in New York City. By this time relations with the record label had become strained as Anxious Records was swallowed by East West Records and band and label parted ways. Following a final headline show at the LA2 in London the band relocated to New York in the spring of 1997 and began recording new material with Bob Rosa and Barrett Jones. The band played their final shows at New York venues CBGB, Maxwell's and Coney Island High in the winter of 1997.

== Members ==
- Tommy James – Vocals / Guitar
- Tony Wilson – Bass / Programming
- Mal Campbell – Guitar / Keyboards / Programming
- Hans Persson – Drums

== Discography ==
Singles:

- Strange Things (Anxious Records/East West) ANX1017CD (1994)
- Messiah (Anxious Records/East West) FOD001CD (1994)
- Beast Inside (Anxious Records/East West) ANX1035CD (1996); appears on Showgirls (soundtrack) (Interscope Records) 92652-2

Album:

- Intoxicated (Anxious Records/East West) (1996)
