= Richard Sands (DJ) =

American radio industry

Richard Sands is employed in the American radio industry.

First program director at Live 105 (KITS-FM) in San Francisco. He began at the station as evening disc jockey when it was a Hot Hits formatted Top 40 station in 1983, eventually rising to the program director position in 1985. He left the station in 1998, after it was merged with CBS co-owned KOME.

He won Billboard Magazine's Major Market Program Director of the Year award, among numerous other honors. In 2024, he was inducted into The Bay Area Radio Hall of Fame.

Born Richard Briskin, he is the son of best-selling author Jacqueline Briskin and former literary agent Bert Briskin.

He currently publishes The Sands Report, a weekly Alternative radio and record company industry newsletter which began in April 2002, after serving three years as Alternative editor at Gavin Magazine.
