= KITS =

Alternative rock radio station in San Francisco

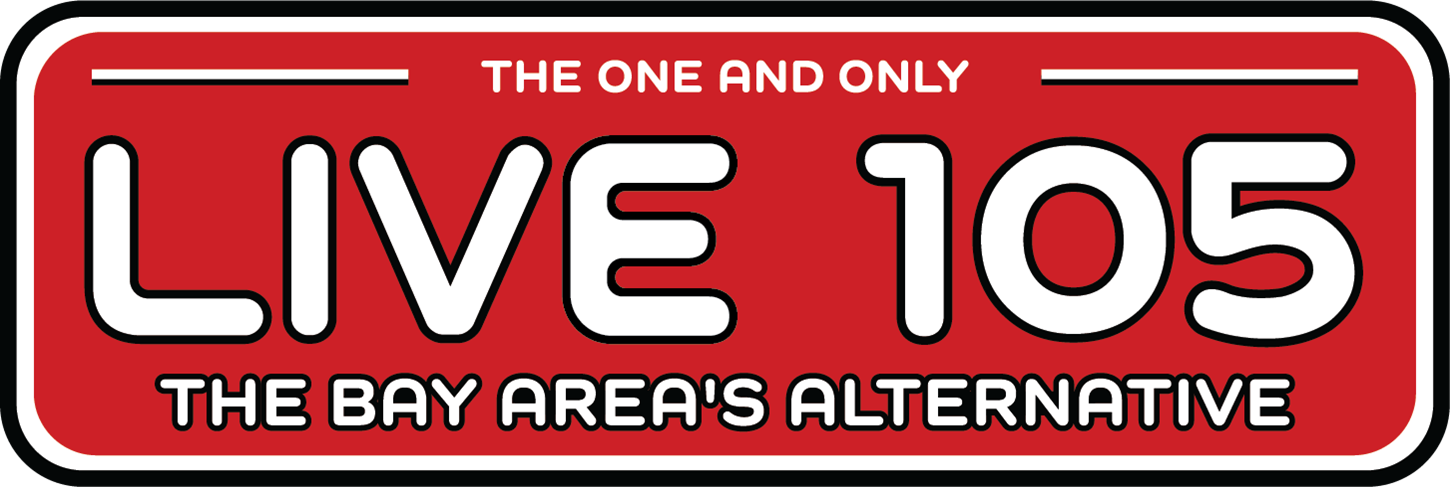
- San Francisco, California; United States
- Broadcast area: San Francisco Bay Area
- Frequency: 105.3 MHz (HD Radio)
- Branding: Live 105

Programming
- Language: English
- Format: Alternative rock
- Affiliations: Westwood One

Ownership
- Owner: Audacy, Inc.; (Audacy License, LLC)
- Sister stations: KCBS, KFRC-FM, KGMZ-FM, KLLC, KRBQ

History
- First air date: December 28, 1959
- Former call signs: KBCO (1959–1964); KBRG (1964–1983)
- Call sign meaning: Hot Hits (reference to former Top 40 format)

Technical information
- Licensing authority: FCC
- Facility ID: 18510
- Class: B
- ERP: 15,000 watts
- HAAT: 366 meters (1,201 ft)
- Transmitter coordinates: 37.689°N 122.436°W
- Repeater: See § FM Boosters

Links
- Public license information: Public file; LMS
- Webcast: Listen live
- Website: www.audacy.com/live105

KITS (105.3 FM, "Live 105") is a commercial radio station licensed to San Francisco, California, United States, and serving the San Francisco Bay Area. Owned by Audacy, Inc., the station broadcasts an alternative rock format known as "Live 105". Its studios and offices are co-located with formerly co-owned KPIX-TV on Battery Street in the North Waterfront district of San Francisco.

KITS's transmitter is located on Radio Road, at San Bruno Mountain in Daly City. KITS additionally broadcasts in the HD Radio format.

== History ==
=== Early years ===
The station's original call sign was KBCO, beginning on December 28, 1959, when it signed on the air. It was owned by Bay Area Broadcasters, with Saul R. Levine as president.

In January 1964, Apollo Broadcasting acquired the station. On June 1, 1964, the call letters were changed to KBRG and became K-Bridge. KBRG carried a stereo classics format, Apollo operated a similar format on KLEF in Houston. In 1969, the station changed hands again, this time acquired by Entertainment Communications, Inc. KBRG carried a multi-ethnic programming format, with music and talk shows in German, Chinese, Italian, Filipino, Arabic, Armenian and Spanish. KBRG was later converted into a fulltime Spanish-language station. At the time, the Spanish-speaking community in San Francisco was growing, but only several AM stations were broadcasting in Spanish. KBRG would switch to Regional Mexican music (as "Stereo En Español") and later Caballero Spanish Radio, the market's only full-power Spanish-language FM station at that time. In 1983, KBRG moved to 104.9

=== Hot hits ===
In February 1983, Entertainment Communications (later renamed Entercom, and the forerunner to Audacy) decided to go in a more mass-appeal direction. The station adopted radio consultant Mike Joseph's Hot Hits Top 40 music format, with the call letters switching to KITS. Seven air personalities were recruited during a nationwide search, coming from stations such as XETRA in San Diego-Tijuana, KBEQ-FM in Kansas City, WXGT in Columbus, Ohio, and WCAU-FM in Philadelphia. The transplanted disc jockeys underwent a "broadcasting bootcamp" for two weeks prior to launching the new Hot Hits format. Radio personality Doug Ritter (Doug Ritterling) was the first DJ on the air when the new format premiered at 9 a.m. on February 27, 1983.

The station was referred to as "Hot Hits KITS". The format featured a short playlist of only current hit songs, with heavy repetition, frequent jingles and fast-talking air personalities.

=== Modern rock ===
==== 1986–1997 ====
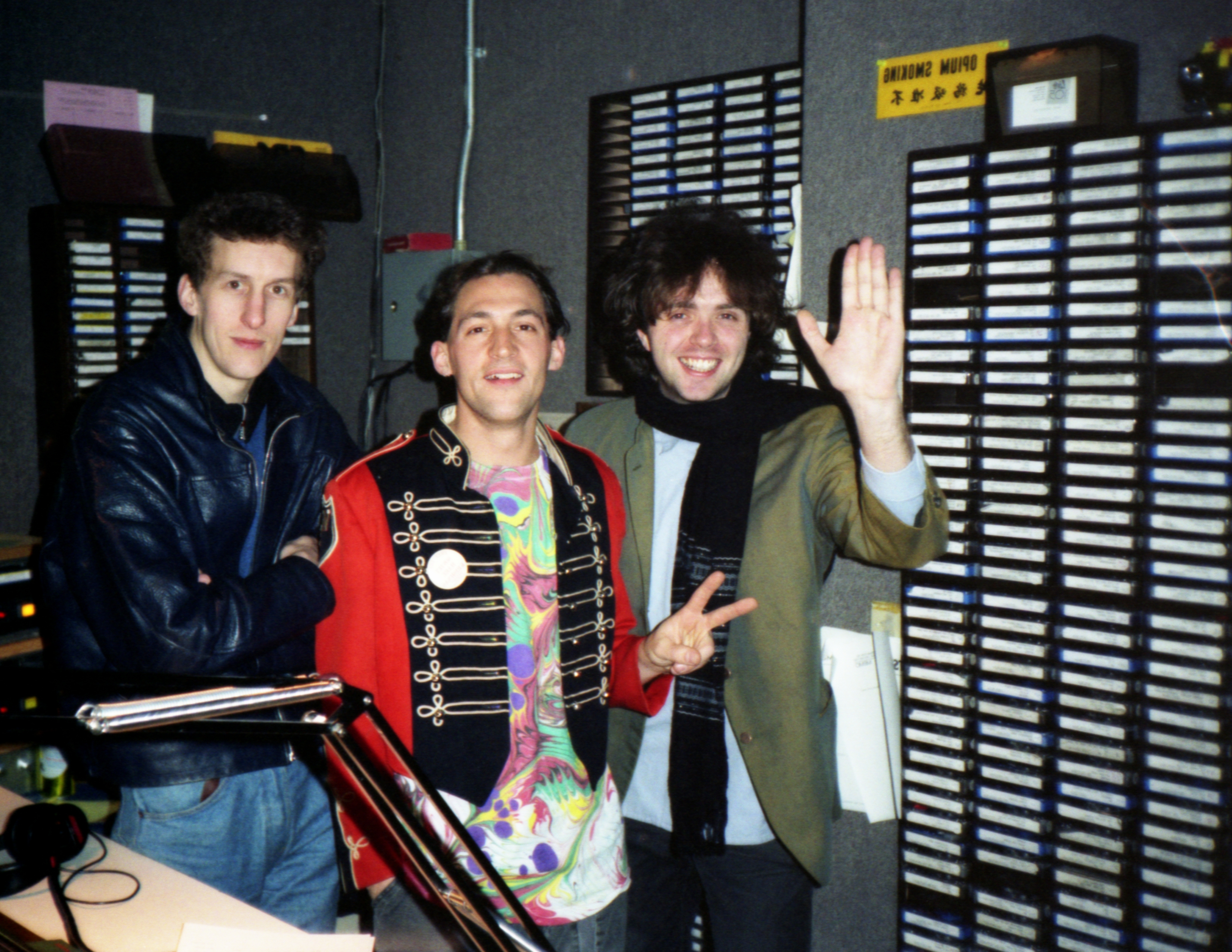
The band Icicle Works visits with DJ Steve Masters in the Live 105 radio studio in San Francisco, California - 1987

Over time, KITS dropped the "Hot Hits" approach. It remained a mainstream CHR station and began a gradual musical shift, incorporating more modern rock songs into the Top 40 playlist. In October 1986, led by General Manager Ed Krampf, KITS dropped the pop and rhythmic artists from the playlist overnight and became a pure modern rock station. The station's new moniker became "Live 105" under GM Ed Krampf, program director Richard Sands and music director Steve Masters.

The music that KITS played ranged from mainstream alternative rock, imports, dance music, and even classic songs from pioneering artists such as Lou Reed, David Bowie and T.Rex. "Live 105" became a national influence on the format and the sole source of radio exposure for such artists in the San Francisco Bay Area.

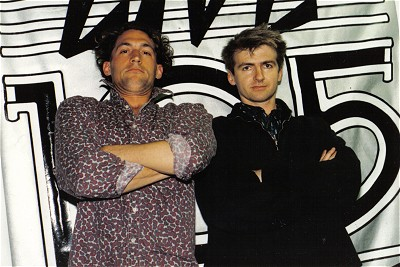
Live 105 DJ Steve Masters with Neil Finn of Crowded House at the station's offices in April 1987

The DJ lineup remained relatively stable from 1986 through 1997, and included Masters, Big Rick Stuart, Alex Bennett and Lori Thompson doing a comedy/talk show in the morning. Bennett was let go from the station in 1989 and replaced by Perry Stone, as Live 105 attempted a "more music" approach in the morning. However, the morning ratings dropped, and Bennett, who briefly went to WIOD in Miami, was brought back.

Hamilton left in 1994 to accept the program director job at modern rock station KNRK in Portland, Oregon, and Steve Masters departed soon after to take a promotion job at MCA's new alternative label, WAY COOL. Roland West then moved from night to middays and took over the music director position, eventually becoming the assistant program director. Aaron Axelsen, then assistant music director, become the music director and host of specialty programs Soundcheck (which highlighted songs from new acts) and Subsonic (which highlighted electronic music). The station also ran Hibernia Beach LIVE, a gay-themed radio call-in show, from 1989 to 1999.

The modern rock format changed nationwide by the 1990s, moving away from the dance-leaning, synthesizer-based European sound to a harder, guitar-driven direction with artists such as Nirvana, Pearl Jam and Soundgarden. After numerous years of success, ratings for KITS began to dip during the late 1990s, as Infinity Broadcasting's KOME in nearby San Jose switched to a harder modern rock format, coupled with carrying the syndicated Howard Stern Show in the mornings. KOME had great success in the ratings and managed to even beat KITS, which was still playing some euro-based music.

==== 1997–2005 ====
On March 11, 1997, owner Entercom sold the station to Infinity Broadcasting (later CBS Radio). This meant that KITS and KOME were now both co-owned. After KITS came under Infinity ownership, a big shakeup occurred on June 1, 1998.

Stern's morning show, KOME's management and programming staff, and a few on-air personalities were brought up from KOME to take over "Live 105". KOME was eventually sold to Jacor, which moved Classic rock-formatted KUFX to the 98.5 FM frequency and the KOME call letters were "parked" on an AM station in Fort Worth, Texas. Program director Richard Sands, assistant program director/midday host Roland West, and the relatively new morning team of Johnny Steele and Lori Thompson were all dismissed. KOME's program director, Jay Taylor, assumed programming duties at the new "Live 105", and Ally Storm and No-Name moved into middays and nights, respectively. The syndicated call-in advice show "Loveline" was also brought to the station as its late-night program. Big Rick Stuart continued in afternoons until being let go in 2000, severing the last remaining thread to the original incarnation of "Live 105", though Steve Masters returned briefly to host a midday specialty show.

By the end of 2001, KITS saw a drastic reduction in listeners due to an unpopular music assortment that was being played, which included some hip hop and heavy metal titles. Toward the middle of 2002, the station hired Sean Demery (formerly of 99X in Atlanta) as Program Director in hopes of bringing back listeners. Demery was charged with refocusing on core alternative rock artists, adding more popular hits, and establishing new artists, while playing a mix of critically acclaimed music from The Cure, The Pixies, Depeche Mode and The Clash, and current artists such as Franz Ferdinand, Bloc Party, and The Killers.

The station regained its reputation as a leader in new music and respect in the industry, winning numerous awards for creativity and playing new bands before they caught on nationally. Muse, The Bravery, Silversun Pickups, and Yeah Yeah Yeahs were among the popular bands that enjoyed huge success after early support from "Live 105".

==== 2005–2010 ====
Logo of Live 105 used from 2003 to 2010

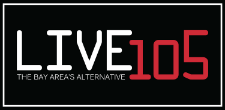
Live 105 logo, 2010-2017

Howard Stern ended his syndicated morning show in December 2005, and departed for Sirius Satellite Radio. In response, CBS Radio flipped nearly all its alternative-formatted radio stations to an all-talk format known as "Free FM". KITS was allowed to keep its music format and thus decided to go in a music-oriented direction for its subsequent morning show, The Woody Show (originally The Morning Music Co-op, then The Woody, Tony and Ravey Show). It was hosted by Jeff "Woody" Fife, Tony Mott, and Renee Ravey, with producer Greg Gory and assistant producer Jason "White Menace" McMurry. Woody, Tony, and Ravey had previously worked afternoons on Chicago alternative rock station WKQX.

The show made its debut on January 3, 2006. The show started gaining popularity, retaining many of the original listeners from Howard Stern. In November 2006, the station hired a new program director, Dave Numme, who was already programming KUFO in Portland (now KXL-FM), another station owned by the CBS Radio. In 2008, Black Planet, the station's underground goth show, returned for a two-hour Halloween special.

Originally thought to be an April Fools' Day joke, The Woody Show was taken off the air on April 1, 2009. It was later confirmed that several members of the program were fired by CBS Radio management. (The Woody Show is now based at alternative rock station KYSR Los Angeles and syndicated nationally by iHeartMedia.) On April 20, 2009, KITS announced that No Name would lead the station's new morning show, to be known as The No Name Show, originally with Greg Gory and Katie as side kicks. The DJ known as No Name had formerly been the morning show co-host on KLLC and a former night jock on KITS in the late 1990s and early 2000s.

Greg Gory was fired from KITS on July 16, 2009, with Matty Staudt taking over producer duties. Staudt and No Name had worked together at KLLC for numerous years. However, the morning show was unable to gain traction in the ratings, and Staudt was let go after one year. In October 2009, Dave Numme was released from his position as program director and the programming reins given to CBS Radio San Francisco's vice president of programming Michael Martin.

==== 2010-2015 ====
On March 30, 2010, the Oakland Raiders football team announced a multi-year agreement for KITS and its sister station, KFRC (now KZDG), to broadcast play-by-play coverage of the team's pre-season, regular season, and post-season games. KITS and KFRC would serve as the team's flagship stations.

In December 2010, the DJ line-up was overhauled by management. The most notable of the changes was airing the syndicated Kevin and Bean show, originating from co-owned Alternative station KROQ-FM in Los Angeles, as the new morning drive time program (5:30–10 a.m.) beginning January 3, 2011. As a result, the No Name Show was broken up as sidekick/traffic reporter Katie was released from the station and No Name was moved from mornings to afternoons, displacing long-time afternoon host Jared Aman. Midday host Kat was also released from the station as part of the changes.

Kevin and Bean lasted nine months. On September 3, 2011, the Kevin and Bean show was dropped in favor of a music-intensive morning show. The duo was subsequently dropped from its syndicator, Westwood One, due to the loss of outlets carrying the show. The show continued on KROQ-FM for Los Angeles listeners until 2018.

Shortly after the dropping of Kevin and Bean in 2011, "Menace", formerly of The Woody Show, took over morning show hosting duties. In August 2012, the show was renamed "Megan and Menace in the Morning". By December, Megan moved back to her previous midday shift, and in April 2013, Steve Masters returned to the station to host the morning show. In December 2013, Masters left the station for a third time.

A new morning show, "Kevin Klein Live", debuted on September 2, 2014. Host Kevin Klein previously worked at Playboy Radio. He is not related to the actor or the hockey player. Klein is also a frequent gambler, which has resulted in many bets made live on the show. One loss resulted in Klein having to pose for an erotic photo-shoot with cats and kale, two things he hates. Co-host Ally Johnson is a Bay Area native with a background in comedy. The show has received press coverage for some of its stunts, including a flash mob parade for competitive eating champion Matt Stonie. Klein also led a campaign to rid San Francisco of selfie sticks.

Some of Klein's most notable interviews include Drew Barrymore, Dave Grohl, Ronda Rousey, and Lisa Johnson, an African-American woman who made headlines after getting kicked off the Napa Valley Wine Train.

==== 2015-2019 ====
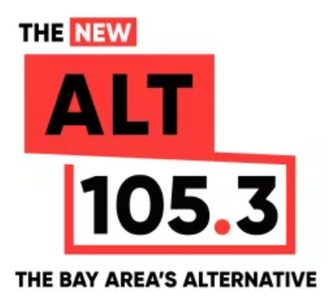
Logo used from 2017 to 2021

On February 2, 2017, CBS Radio announced it would merge with Entercom. The merger was approved on November 9, 2017, and was consummated on November 17. The merger returned KITS to its former owners for the first time in 20 years. On December 22, 2017, KITS re-branded as "Alt 105.3", with no change in format. The re-brand was part of the national strategy to use the same moniker for its alternative music formatted stations that included sister stations WBMP (now WINS-FM) in New York City, KVIL in Dallas, and WQMP (now WJHM) in Orlando, which also flipped to alternative rock following the Entercom acquisition.

On January 3, 2018, the "Kevin Klein Live" morning show was dropped from KITS, with Entercom later announcing that he would move to its recently launched San Diego hot talk station KEGY as its morning show, beginning March 29. However, Klein's show (and later, the hot talk format as a whole) would be dropped before its premiere after attracting controversy for an advertisement that made light of suicide by bridge jumping.

After running without a morning show after the "Alt" rebranding, KITS added Elvis Medina in mornings on May 30, 2018. Medina had co-hosted mornings on KYLD as part of the long-running The Dog House. In October 2018, Medina was teamed up with co-host Daena 'DK' Kramer, who spent many years at Las Vegas sister station KXTE-FM, but the pairing lasted for only five months as Medina was let go. 'DK' remained to host the show solo until February 2020.

==== 2020–present ====
On April 2, 2020, Aaron Axelsen was released from the station after 23 years due to budget cuts. On September 14, 2020, Entercom implemented the roll-out of their nationwide network programming across all their alternative music formatted stations, which originates from central hubs in New York City and Los Angeles. By the end of the alternative format's run, the majority of on-air personalities and specialty shows originated from outside the San Francisco Bay Area region.

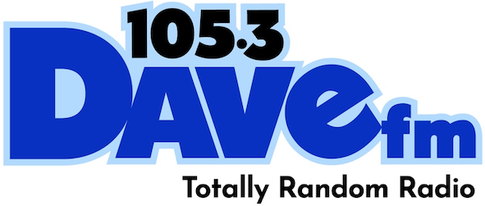
Logo as Dave FM, 2021-23

===== Dave FM =====
On October 15, 2021, at 1 pm, KITS ended its alternative rock format after 35 years, and flipped to adult hits as 105.3 Dave FM. The last song on "Alt" was "Last Kiss" by Pearl Jam, while the first song on "Dave FM" was "Welcome To The Jungle" by Guns N' Roses. One day after the format change, the station inadvertently played four hours of commercials due to a "corrupted music database". After the error was caught, the station played archived "Alt 105.3" programming from the spring of 2020, until it returned to "Dave FM" programming the following morning.

===== Return to Live 105 =====
In February 2022, the station relaunched its Classic Live 105 HD Radio subchannel (reviving a previous format of the HD2 subchannel, which had later switched to an indie rock-focused Indie 105, and Audacy's "New Arrivals" format), with a focus on classic alternative rock from the 1980s through the 2000s.

On June 2, 2023, the station began stunting, dropping all references to the Dave FM branding and imaging, but airing promos and sweepers highlighting the station's previous history as Live 105, and counting down to June 5. On June 3, Audacy officially announced that KITS would revive the Live 105 branding at 10:53 a.m. on June 5, with a gold-leaning modern rock format featuring "music from every era of [KITS's] history as the Bay Area's Alternative". Axelsen would return to KITS to oversee the relaunch, and revived Soundcheck in July 2023.

== Concerts ==
KITS had hosted two major concerts every year from 1994 to 2018. "BFD" was held every June at the Shoreline Amphitheatre in Mountain View, California that would run all day with up-and-coming bands performing on the festival stage during the day, and more established bands on the main stage at night. The first BFD concert took place in June 1994 with artists such as Beck, Green Day, and The Pretenders and continue to showcase a wide range of artists including Red Hot Chili Peppers, The White Stripes, Blink 182, Hole, The Killers, The Strokes, 311, Third Eye Blind, Foo Fighters, Panic! at the Disco, The Offspring, Stone Temple Pilots, and the Beastie Boys as well as older bands such as Duran Duran, Social Distortion, and The Cure.

The station's winter concert, "Not So Silent Night", formerly known as the "Green Christmas Ball" and "Electronica Hanukkah", occurred in early December and has featured such bands as Linkin Park, Muse, Green Day, Kasabian, The Killers, My Chemical Romance, Smashing Pumpkins, System of a Down, Blink-182, David Bowie, Franz Ferdinand, The White Stripes, Silversun Pickups, Modest Mouse, Cake, Paramore, Angels & Airwaves, Spoon, Jimmy Eat World, Death Cab for Cutie, and Everclear.

From 2009 to 2014, KITS hosted the "Subsonic Halloween Spookfest", which debuted on October 30, 2009, at the Cow Palace in San Francisco. The Halloween-themed concert featured three stages of entertainment, having included performances over the years by The Faint, Basement Jaxx, Crystal Method, DJ Steve Aoki, Crystal Castles, MSTRKRFT, Underworld, DJ Shadow, and many other electronic and rock artists that were regularly featured on the station's Saturday night show, Subsonic.

== Boosters ==
KITS is rebroadcast on the following FM boosters:

Call sign	Frequency	City of license	FID	ERP (W)	HAAT	Class	FCC info
KITS-FM1	105.3 FM	Walnut Creek, California	18524	610 (Horiz.)	−39 m (−128 ft)	D	LMS
KITS-FM2	105.3 FM	Pleasanton, California	18521	44 (Horiz.)	378 m (1,240 ft)	D	LMS
KITS-FM4	105.3 FM	Antioch, California	18526	330 (Vert.)	−19 m (−62 ft)	D	LMS

== Awards ==
In 1989, Live 105 won Billboard magazine's award for Radio Station of the Year – Rock.

In 2007, the station was nominated for the top 25 markets Alternative Station of the Year award by Radio & Records magazine. Other nominees included WBCN in Boston, KROQ-FM in Los Angeles, KTBZ-FM in Houston, KNDD in Seattle, and WWDC in Washington, D.C.
