= Rambo =

Rambo may refer to:

== Arts, entertainment, and media ==
=== Fictional characters ===
- John Rambo, the main character from the Rambo franchise
- Mary Rambo, female character in Invisible Man

=== Films ===
- Rambo (franchise), starring Sylvester Stallone, commonly named after the main character
  - First Blood (1982)
    - First Blood (soundtrack), the soundtrack to the first film in the Rambo franchise
  - Rambo: First Blood Part II (1985)
    - Rambo: First Blood Part II (soundtrack), the soundtrack to the second film in the Rambo franchise
  - Rambo III (1988)
    - Rambo III (soundtrack), the soundtrack to the third film in the Rambo franchise
  - Rambo (2008 film)
    - Rambo (soundtrack), the soundtrack to the fourth film in the Rambo franchise
  - Rambo: Last Blood (2019)
    - Rambo: Last Blood (soundtrack), the soundtrack to the fifth film in the Rambo franchise
  - John Rambo (film) (2027)
- Rambo (2012 film), an Indian Kannada-language comedy film
- Raambo 2, its 2018 sequel
- Rambo (2025 film), an Indian Tamil-language sports action drama film

=== Television ===
- Rambo: The Force of Freedom, a 1986 animated series based on the Rambo franchise

=== Novelizations ===
- First Blood (novel), a 1972 novel by David Morrell
- Rambo: First Blood Part II, a 1985 novelization by David Morrell based on Rambo: First Blood Part II
- Rambo III, a 1988 novelization by David Morrell based on Rambo III

=== Comic books ===
- Rambo Adventures, a 1986 Italian comic book series based on the Rambo franchise
- Rambo III, a 1989 comic book adaptation of Rambo III
- Rambo, a 1989 comic book series published by Blackthorne Publishing based on the Rambo franchise

=== Video games ===
- Rambo (1985 video game), based on Rambo: First Blood Part II
- Rambo: First Blood Part II (Master System video game), based on Rambo: First Blood Part II
- Rambo (1987 video game), based on Rambo: First Blood Part II
- Rambo III (video game), based on Rambo III
- Rambo (2008 video game), based on Rambo: First Blood Part II and Rambo III
- Rambo: The Video Game, a 2014 game based on First Blood, Rambo: First Blood Part II and Rambo III

== Music ==
- Rambo (band), an American hardcore punk band
- The Rambos, an American Southern gospel music group

== People ==
=== Pseudonym ===
- Rambo Amadeus (born 1963), Serbian-Montenegrin rock musician
- John "Rambo" Arias, one of the hip hop trio 1 Life 2 Live
- Jorge Otero Barreto (born 1937), known as "the Puerto Rican Rambo"
- Niko Eeckhout (born 1970), Belgian cyclist nicknamed "Rambo"
- Trond Henriksen (born 1964), Norwegian football manager nicknamed "Rambo"
- Afzal Khan (actor) (born 1966), Pakistani actor also known as "John Rambo"
- Ronald "Rambo" Kim, American Counter-Strike player
- Florin Lambagiu (born 1996), professional kickboxer whose professional name is "Rambo"
- Julio César de León (born 1979), Honduran Soccer player nicknamed "Rambo"
- Alan McInally (born 1963), Scottish former soccer player and male model nicknamed "Rambo"
- Dejan Petković (born 1972), Serbian football player nicknamed "Rambo"
- Luc Poirier (born 1961), professional wrestler whose professional name is "Rambo"
- Aaron Ramsey, Welsh Arsenal football player nicknamed "Rambo"
- John "Rambo" Stevens, English record producer, manager and minder of John Lydon

=== Surname ===
- Bacarri Rambo (born 1990), American football player
- Buck Rambo, musician of The Rambos
- Cat Rambo (born 1963), American science-fiction and fantasy author and editor
- Charleston Rambo (born 1999), American football player
- Christoffer Rambo (born 1989), Norwegian professional handball player
- Dack Rambo (1941–1994), American actor
- David Rambo (born 1955), American writer, actor and producer
- Dottie Rambo (1934–2008), Southern Gospel singer and songwriter of The Rambos
- John Rambo (athlete) (1943–2022), American high jumper
- John Rambo (politician) (1661–1741), American politician, son of Peter Gunnarsson Rambo
- Ken-Yon Rambo (born 1978), American football player in the Canadian Football League
- Peter Gunnarsson Rambo (1612–1698), North American settler who introduced the Rambo apple
- Reba Rambo (born 1951), Southern Gospel singer of The Rambos
- Sylvia Rambo (1936–2024), American judge
- Victor Clough Rambo (1894–1987), American physician

== Places ==
- Rambo Department, Yatenga Province, Burkina Faso
  - Rambo, Burkina Faso, the capital of Rambo Department
- Bridge Plaza, Brooklyn, a neighborhood in New York City, U.S., sometimes nicknamed "RAMBO" (for "Right Around the Manhattan Bridge Overpass")

== Other uses ==
- Icarus F99 Rambo, a Romanian ultralight aircraft
- Rambo apple, a fruit variety named for Peter Gunnarsson Rambo
- Robust associations of massive baryonic objects (RAMBO), a theoretical construct in astrophysics
- Rambo (fox), a feral red fox in Australia that evaded capture for four and a half years
- Rambo Lambo, a nickname for the off-road vehicle Lamborghini LM002

== See also ==
- Rimbaud (surname), a French surname
- Lambo (disambiguation)
- Ramba (disambiguation)
