= F99 =

F99 or F-99 may refer to:

- F-99 Bomarc, a 1957 joint United States of America–Canada missile
- HMS Cornwall (F99), a 1985 British Royal Navy Type 22 frigate
- HMS Lincoln (F99), a 1959 British Royal Navy Salisbury-class aircraft direction frigate
- Icarus F99 Rambo, Romanian ultralight aircraft
