= Rambo: The Video Game =

2014 video game

- North American PC cover artwork featuring Sylvester Stallone as John Rambo
- Developer: Teyon
- Publisher: Reef Entertainment Ltd
- Directors: Craig Lewis; Will Curley
- Producers: Piotr Latocha; Mariusz Sajak
- Programmer: Jakub Lisinski
- Composer: Jakub Gawlina
- Series: Rambo franchise
- Platforms: Microsoft Windows; Xbox 360; PlayStation 3
- Release: PAL: February 21, 2014; NA: April 29, 2014 (PC, PS3)
- Genre: Rail shooter
- Modes: Single-player, multiplayer

Rambo: The Video Game is a 2014 arcade-style rail shooter video game developed by Teyon and published by Reef Entertainment. The game is based on the Rambo franchise and puts the player in the role of John Rambo as he journeys through scenes from each of the first three films: First Blood (1982), Rambo: First Blood Part II (1985) and Rambo III (1988).

A teaser trailer was released by Machinima, Inc., containing montages from the films. The game was originally set to release in winter 2013, but was eventually delayed to early 2014. The game was a critical failure, with criticism directed towards the poor quality of the graphics, the repetitive nature of the gameplay, and the overall lack of polish.

== Gameplay ==
Players assume the role of John Rambo as he plays out scenes from the first three Rambo films: First Blood (1982), Rambo: First Blood Part II (1985), and Rambo III (1988). The mechanics of the game include stealth, demolition, and fighting off enemies using knives, arrows, and guns, using a cover system to avoid taking fire. The player moves through the environment by a rail shooter engine. The game includes destructible terrain and ragdoll physics for animating characters. The PlayStation 3 version supports the PlayStation Move peripheral. In between missions, the player can obtain special perks that increase Rambo's endurance, weapon handling skills, and the amount of "wrath" he can obtain from killing enemies. Using "wrath" while in combat allows Rambo to regenerate health while also highlighting enemies on-screen. Rambo can wield a variety of assault rifles, machine guns, pistols, shotguns, and submachine guns, all of which can be purchased using points that the player earns from killing enemies rapidly, and which are tallied up at the end of every mission. The game also features "Trautman Challenges" that encourage replaying completed missions.

== Plot ==
In 1988, at a military funeral for John Rambo, a speaker honors him for his service and tells the story of how he met Rambo. In 1971, Rambo is part of an elite Green Beret team captured during a mission and held in a remote North Vietnamese POW camp, where, one by one, the men are tortured and starved to death, until only Rambo and Staff Sergeant Delmar Barry are still alive. The two men free themselves, steal weapons, and shoot their way through the camp until American reinforcements arrive and rescue them. The speaker explains that while Rambo survived, the suffering he endured as a POW changed him forever.

In 1982, Rambo, having since been discharged from the army and struggling with severe PTSD, travels to Hope, a small town in Washington, hoping to find Barry. He learns that Barry died from cancer, a consequence of exposure to Agent Orange during his service. While walking into town, he is intercepted by the local sheriff, Will Teasle, who orders him to leave. When Rambo disobeys, he is arrested and subjected to abuse and beatings by Teasle and his deputies. Rambo finally snaps after being threatened with a straight razor, fights his way outside, and flees into the woods. After a deputy is accidentally killed while trying to shoot him, Rambo is blamed and hunted by the police and the National Guard. The experience proves too much for his damaged mind, and Rambo steals a machine gun, guns down every cop and soldier he sees, and shoots up the police station before moving in to kill Teasle. The only thing that stops him is the sudden appearance of his former commanding officer, Colonel Sam Trautman, who persuades Rambo to surrender and accept punishment.

Three years later, Rambo receives an offer from Trautman: if he agrees to return to the camp where he was imprisoned and obtain photographic evidence that American POWs are still being held there, he will be pardoned for his crimes. Rambo agrees and travels to Vietnam, where he meets Co Bao, a young Vietnamese spy with whom he forms a romantic attachment. The two infiltrate the camp and, against orders, Rambo rescues one of the POWs. He and Co are discovered and are forced to make a run for their boat. Armored gunboats follow them. Rambo destroys one before the group jumps into the water and swims to shore. A chopper sent to pick them up is ordered to turn back as Rambo has violated his orders. Rambo is captured, tortured, and forced by the Soviets to broadcast a message to his superiors warning them not to rescue him. Rambo gets the upper hand on his captors, but when he and Co try to escape, she is killed by a Vietnamese officer. A heartbroken Rambo buries her and goes on a rampage, using stealth and guerrilla tactics to slaughter dozens of Soviet and Vietnamese troops. He hijacks a Soviet chopper, burns the camp to the ground, and rescues the POWs. A Soviet gunship intercepts them, and Rambo destroys it with a rocket before taking the POWs to safety.

Rambo's funeral concludes, as the speaker reveals he was one of the rescued POWs. He also admits his sorrow that Rambo died before being able to rescue Trautman, who was recently reported missing in action while working with Afghan rebels fighting against a Soviet invasion. In Thailand, Rambo, having spent several years in hiding, travels to Afghanistan when he learns that the U.S. government has no intention of saving Trautman. He meets with the rebels only seconds before their village is raided by Soviet troops, and helps fight them off before leaving under the cover of darkness to infiltrate the mountain base where his mentor is held. He reaches Trautman's cell but is forced to flee after meeting stiff enemy resistance. Returning the next day, Rambo shoots his way through the prison, rescues Trautman, and steals a helicopter, which is damaged by gunfire and crashes in the desert just outside the base. Rambo and Trautman are attacked by two choppers, one of which Rambo destroys, before fleeing into a cave where Soviet commandos attempt to hunt them down. Rambo eliminates the commandos, but a massive Soviet force traps him and Trautman. A surprise rebel cavalry charge turns the tables on the Soviets, and Rambo seizes one of their tanks, using it to blow up the gunship carrying the Soviet commander.

Trautman and Rambo receive well-wishes from the rebels for their help, before driving off.

== Development ==
John Rambo uses a tree as cover and to avoid detection.

Reef Entertainment acquired video game development and publishing rights in August 2011 to the Rambo franchise from the rights holder StudioCanal. As of August 2011, the three Rambo series films had grossed over US$600 million. The publisher said the purchase was fueled by the 2008 Rambo's success and by the then-scheduled release of the action film The Expendables 2, starring Sylvester Stallone. They stated that they planned to use the rights as a launching pad for the company. In August 2011 the publisher said a Rambo: The Video Game would be released at retailers in 2012 and would be available on the PlayStation 3, Xbox 360, and Microsoft Windows. Jeffrey Matulef of Eurogamer said on October 5, 2012, that he did not believe the game would see release before the end of the year.

Reef Entertainment's commercial director Craig Lewis describes the game as allowing players to "get under the skin of Rambo and wield his iconic weapon-set in battle." The developer used the actors from the film series to provide voices in the game for both John Rambo, played by Sylvester Stallone, and Col. Trautman, played by Richard Crenna. However, the developer did not actually hire the two actors to provide voice work (Crenna died in 2003) but instead contacted the owner of the film series, StudioCanal, and acquired copies of the original voice tapes for the series to use in-game.

== Reception ==
Reception

Aggregate score
Aggregator	Score		
Aggregator	PC	PS3	Xbox 360
Metacritic	34/100	23/100	28/100

Review scores
Publication	Score		
Publication	PC	PS3	Xbox 360
Destructoid	1/10	N/A	N/A
Edge	5/10	N/A	N/A
Eurogamer	5/10	N/A	N/A
Game Informer	4/10	N/A	N/A
GamesMaster	23%	N/A	N/A
GameSpot	N/A	N/A	6/10
GamesTM	4/10	N/A	4/10
IGN	3/10	3/10	3/10
PlayStation Official Magazine – UK	N/A	2/10	N/A
Official Xbox Magazine (UK)	N/A	N/A	2/10
The Escapist	1/5	N/A	N/A
The Observer	1/5	1/5	1/5

Rambo: The Video Game received "generally unfavorable" reviews on all platforms according to the review aggregation website Metacritic. Reviews criticized the game for its outdated graphics, generic rail-shooter gameplay and copious use of quick-time events. Reviews also criticized the game for its frequent crashing/freezing, poor enemy A.I. and very short length (the main story can be completed in a few hours).

IGN said that its on-the-rails game mechanic "feels like an unmitigated waste of time for everybody involved." Destructoid said the game was "an unpolished, uninspired on-rails lightgun game" and that "even the act of shooting doesn't feel impactful or fun." GameSpot contended that the game's frenetic action is enjoyable if taken for what it is, rather than judged against one's expectations of what a Rambo game should be. They praised the directional cover system as being an innovation over most light gun shooters, and the difficulty setting, scoring system, and bonus objectives as adding longevity, though they found the graphics poor and said the use of audio clips from the films makes the volume vary wildly during cutscenes.

Giant Bomb nominated Rambo for the Worst Game award in 2014.
