= List of Rambo characters =

List of characters that appeared in Rambo franchise

There are many characters in the Rambo franchise, although the only two to appear in multiple films are Rambo himself and Colonel Trautman.

== Main characters ==
=== John James Rambo ===
John James Rambo is an iconic titular character and the protagonist of the Rambo franchise. A former Vietnam War veteran and highly skilled Green Beret, Rambo returned from the war as a decorated, but disturbed hero. He is filled with self-loathing and hates killing, but is willing to use his skills to protect those close to him. This is the general plot line of the three First Blood sequels. The main character of the series, Rambo appears in all the films. The only character to come close to this is Sam Trautman, his mentor, and commander in Vietnam.

He is played by Sylvester Stallone in five films, and Noah Centineo in the prequel, as well as the video game Mortal Kombat 11 DLC Kombat Pack 2 and voiced by Neil Ross in the animated series.

=== Colonel Samuel Richard "Sam" Trautman ===
Colonel Samuel Richard "Sam" Trautman is the secondary character in the franchise. He was born on July 6, 1929, in Columbus, Ohio. After graduating from Hilldale High School in his hometown and receiving a B.A. in Sociology from University of Texas in 1950, Trautman joined the United States Army through the ROTC. It is also possible that he enlisted during World War II. After serving in the Korean War, Trautman joined the fledgling Special Forces and was promoted to captain. At the start of the Vietnam War, Trautman began his first combat tour as an adviser to the ARVN. Following his return to the United States, Trautman was selected to form a special forces unit along the lines of S.O.G. It was here that Trautman first met John Rambo, who at that time was a young man who had left both his home and an abusive father. Over the months in training, Trautman became a substitute father for the young Rambo, especially as Rambo was the youngest of the group. When Trautman completed the group's Special Forces training, they were sent on the first of two tours of Vietnam. Trautman's team received the code name of Baker Team and usually consisted of eight men.

The known members of Baker Team were John Rambo, Delmore Barry, Joseph "Joey" Danforth, Manuel "Loco" Ortega, Paul Messner, Delbert Krackheur, Giuseppe "Greasy Cunt" Colletta, and Ralph Jorghenson. Rambo, Barry, and Trautman are said to be Baker Team's only surviving members from Vietnam, though Barry eventually dies of cancer the summer prior to the events of First Blood.

He is played by Richard Crenna in the first three Rambo films, David Harbour in the prequel, and voiced by Alan Oppenheimer in the animated series.

== Introduced in First Blood (1972/1982) ==
=== Sheriff William "Will" Teasle ===
Sheriff William "Will" Teasle (Brian Dennehy) appears in First Blood. He serves as the main antagonist as well as the sheriff of Hope and strongly dislikes "unwanted elements" in his town, like drifters. Teasle arrests John Rambo for this reason, but Rambo eventually escapes. As the film progresses, Teasle becomes enemies with Rambo. He initially wants to take Rambo alive, but when Art Galt is killed while trying to shoot Rambo, Teasle becomes obsessed with hunting him down and killing him, even after learning that Rambo was a war hero in Vietnam. Teasle later meets Colonel Trautman; the two men seem to respect each other, although they both clearly dislike one another. At the end of the film, Rambo severely injures Teasle and almost kills him before Trautman intervenes and stops him, unlike in the novel, where Teasle and Rambo kill each other. He is last seen being taken into an ambulance, and he is not seen or mentioned again in later films with an exception of a brief flashback during the fourth film.

=== Deputy Sergeant Arthur "Art" Galt ===
Deputy Sergeant Arthur "Art" Galt (Jack Starrett) is Teasle's head deputy, and also his closest friend. He is shown to be very cruel, as he tortures Rambo to the approval of most of the other deputies. He gets beaten up by Rambo as he escapes the police station. Teasle sends him to look for Rambo in a helicopter. Despite Teasle's orders to take him alive, Galt tries to kill him in cold blood as he climbs down from a cliff, threatening to kill the pilot if he does not fly straight so that he can get a clear shot, and ignoring Teasle on his radio. When Rambo is cornered against a tree, he throws a rock at the helicopter's windshield, causing Galt to fall from the helicopter into the gorge, to his death.

=== Deputy Mitch Rogers ===
Deputy Mitch Rogers (David Caruso) is the only deputy in First Blood who is pleasant to Rambo and even shows disgust when Art Galt sadistically tortures Rambo. Upon learning that Rambo was a Green Beret and a Medal of Honor recipient he tries to talk Teasle out of killing Rambo only to be ridiculed by the Sheriff. Eventually he is taken out when Rambo stabs him in the leg during the manhunt, however he was unfeeling to the injury having told a fellow deputy that Rambo was being abused by Galt and others to thwart Teasle hunting for Rambo.

== Introduced in Rambo: First Blood Part II (1985) ==
=== Agent Co Phuong Bao ===
A native girl named Agent Co Phuong Bao (Julia Nickson) appears in Rambo: First Blood Part II. She works for an intelligence agency. She wants to leave her country, and she arranges for Rambo and herself to go upstream with a group of river pirates. Rambo comes to the camp, and in contradiction to his briefing, he finds US prisoners there and rescues one of them from a makeshift crucifixion. Later, Co enters the camp, in the guise of a prostitute, and comes to the hut in which Rambo is held captive. Rambo agrees to Podovsky's conditions, but instead threatens Murdock on the radio that he is "coming to get you", then escapes from captivity into a nearby jungle with Co's help. Co then tends to Rambo's wounds and begins to implore him to take her to the United States. Rambo agrees, and they kiss. However, they are then attacked by some Vietnamese soldiers, and Co is killed. Rambo kills them all (except for their commander, who escapes, but is later killed by one of Rambo's exploding arrows) and then buries Co's body in the jungle.

In Rambo III Co Bao's necklace is seen being worn by Rambo for the duration of the film. Rambo eventually gives the necklace to Hamid.

In Rambo: The Force of Freedom, Co Bao was used as the inspiration for Katherine Anne "K.A.T." Taylor (voiced by Mona Marshall), who was also a master of disguise, gymnastics, and martial arts.

Co Bao appears in Rambo via flashbacks. The flashbacks were scenes from the second film.

=== Major Marshall Roger T. Murdock ===
Major Marshall Roger T. Murdock (Charles Napier) is an American bureaucrat and CIA field operative who is in charge of the operation. In Rambo: First Blood Part II, he tells Rambo that the demand by the American public for knowledge about the POWs will be found by a trained commando under certain conditions. Rambo is briefed that rescue is not the aim of the mission, only photographs of the POWs. The enemy is not to be engaged. Rambo reluctantly agrees to the mission before he is told an agent of the American government will receive him in the jungles of Vietnam. Murdock claims that in 1966 he served with the 2nd battalion, 3rd Marines at Kon Tum. Rambo realizes the unit did not exist then. It becomes known that Murdock cares little about the mission being successful. Murdock either beloves that no evidence will be found of the POWs or Rambo killed before the mission is completed. Rambo returns with POWs and confronts Murdock for the betrayal telling him that there are more POWs. Rambo demands that Murdock have those still captive returned or Rambo will kill Murdock. Nothing is revealed about what happens with Murdock.

=== Michael Reed Ericson ===
Michael Reed Ericson (Martin Kove), one of Murdock's associates, is a CIA paramilitary operative and skillful mercenary pilot who can fly fixed and rotary-winged aircraft equally well. He seems a pleasant character, who attempts to befriend Rambo. When Murdoch orders Rambo's betrayal, he reluctantly complies. When Rambo flies the POWs back to the base, Ericson greets Rambo and congratulates him for surviving, only for Rambo to knock him unconscious with a machine gun over a misunderstanding.

=== Lifer ===
Lifer, another of Murdock's mercenaries, a CIA paramilitary operative (Steve Williams) is a seedy-looking character who, along with Ericson, betrays Rambo on Murdoch's orders. When Trautman argues, Lifer holds a gun to his head. At the end when Rambo returns with the POWs, Lifer hides amongst the Army personnel helping the POWs onto waiting ambulances.

=== Lieutenant Tay ===
Lieutenant Tay is a vicious POW-camp officer played by George Kee Cheung. Tay, who tortures the POWs and Rambo when he is captured, is ultimately killed by Rambo in revenge for the death of Co-Bao.

=== Captain Vinh ===
Captain Vinh, POW Camp commander. Ends up burned to death in a fire set by Rambo.

=== Banks ===
Banks (Andy Wood) is an American POW who is rescued by Rambo and Co-Bao. He is shocked by how long he has been held captive.

=== Sergeant Yushin ===
Sergeant Yushin is a Russian soldier. He is Podovsky's henchman. He serves as a torturer and electrocutes Rambo to force him to make a radio call. He and Rambo later fight each other in a Soviet helicopter and he is thrown out of the chopper and falls to his death.

=== Lieutenant Colonel Sergei T. Podovsky ===
Lieutenant Colonel Sergei T. Podovsky, a Soviet commander and the main antagonist, he is played by Steven Berkoff. He first arrives at the POW camp after Rambo is captured. He and Yushin torture Rambo, and later threaten to torture Banks, to make him radio the Americans that no further rescue attempts should be made for the POWs. When Rambo later destroys the entire camp and frees the POWs, Podovsky chases after them in an attack helicopter. After Rambo's chopper gets damaged in the chase, Rambo tricks the Soviet by pretending to be dead and immobile. When Podovsky flew close enough, Rambo blows him and his helicopter up with a rocket launcher, killing Podovsky and the crew inside.

== Introduced in Rambo III (1988) ==
=== Colonel Alexei Zaysen ===
Colonel Alexei Zaysen (Marc de Jonge) is a Soviet colonel and the main antagonist, who has managed to keep his sector of an Afghan province under total control since 1983. He is a ruthless commander of the Soviet garrison in which Colonel Trautman is imprisoned, and is also a veteran combat helicopter pilot. He and his henchman Kourov (Randy Raney) capture Trautman, who Rambo later rescues. He is also killed in an explosion while trying to destroy Rambo.

=== Robert Griggs ===
Robert Griggs is the U.S. embassy and CIA field operative in Thailand. He is portrayed by Kurtwood Smith. He and Trautman search for John Rambo to recruit him for a supply mission in Afghanistan, which Rambo refuses. While in Afghanistan, Trautman's troops are ambushed by Soviet troops while passing through the mountains at night. Trautman is imprisoned in a Soviet base and coerced for information by Colonel Zaysen (Marc de Jonge) and his henchman Kourov (Randy Raney). Rambo learns of the incident from Griggs and convinces Griggs to take him through an unofficial operation, despite Griggs' warning that the U.S. government will deny any knowledge of his actions if killed or caught (to which Rambo replied, "I'm used to it").

=== Masoud ===
Masoud (Spiros Focás) is a Mujahideen chieftain and village leader, helped Rambo break-in the Soviet fort and free Trautman.

=== Mousa Ghani ===
Mousa Ghani (Sasson Gabai) is a Mujahideen fighter who lives in Peshawar, Pakistan, where he transports medical supplies to the Afghan province immediately over the border. Moussa is enlisted by Griggs to help get Rambo across the border and into the Soviet fort holding Trautman. Although he initially doubts Rambo's abilities, he still leads him inside the fort.

=== Hamid ===
Hamid is a young Afghan orphan whose parents were killed by Soviet troops and aspires to gain revenge by becoming a Mujahideen fighter. Hamid sneaks along when Rambo and Mousa enter the fort, endangering them, when Rambo and himself are wounded, it forces Rambo to give up on the attempt to free Trautman. Rambo later gives Hamid Co-Bao's necklace. Hamid returns with the Mujahideen fighters for the final battle against the Soviet. Hamid asks Rambo if he wants his necklace back in which he says no. Hamid asks Rambo to stay he says he cannot. The two say goodbye.

=== Sergeant Kourov ===
Sergeant Kourov, Colonel Zaysen's henchman. He is a Spetsnaz commando and a large brute. He assists in torturing Trautman and hunting for Rambo. Rambo kills him with a grenade.

== Introduced in Rambo (2008) ==
=== Dr. Michael Burnett ===
Dr. Michael Burnett (Paul Schulze) is the leader of a church mission attempting to deliver humanitarian aid to a Karen tribe in Burma. He and Sarah were engaged before the events of the film. He and the rest of his group (including Sarah) were captured after Tatmadaw overran the tribal village and killed most of its residents there, causing the church pastor to hire mercenaries and Rambo to mount a rescue. He initially expressed disgust to the visible aspects of war and killing people in general (especially when Rambo kills some Burmese pirates who intended to rape Sarah and kill the rest of them), stating that taking a life was never right. He was eventually able to come to terms with the fact that sometimes even mere survival needs to be fought for. This is shown near the end of the film, when he angrily beats a Tatmadaw soldier to death with a rock to save a mercenary, an act that left him in shock. He eventually survived the journey and reunites with Sarah.

=== Sarah Miller ===
Sarah Miller (Julie Benz) is a sixth-grade teacher stateside. She is engaged to Michael Burnett (Paul Schulze). An idealist, she managed to persuade a disillusioned Rambo into taking them to Burma and was the only person in the church mission who attempted to start a conversation with him. On the trip to Burma she was discovered to be a woman by Burmese soldiers. Rambo saved her from what otherwise would have been gang rape and sexual slavery. She was taken prisoner by Tatmadaw. Thanks to subsequent efforts by Rambo to throw off Tatmadaw pursuers, and protection rendered by a mercenary called School Boy, she remained free from re-captivity upon the rescue mission's completion. After the climactic battle, she reunited with Michael.

=== Lewis ===
Lewis (Graham McTavish) is one of the mercenaries hired to retrieve the Christian missionaries abducted by the Tatmadaw. A former SAS with rudeness streak. He states he does mercenary work to pay off his ex-wife's alimony and child support for his 3 children. Although he constantly bickered with everyone and was stubborn, he did prove to be a big asset to getting the missionaries back. He survived the battle, but was injured and being attended by Michael and the Rebels.

=== "School Boy" ===
"School Boy" (Matthew Marsden) is a young British mercenary and ex-SBS sniper who turns out to be more personable than the rest of the group. His skills with a Barrett M82CQ - 50 BMG sniper rifle were demonstrated when, during the covert assault on the Tatmadaw camp where the captured missionaries were held, he eliminated multiple sentries to keep the escape route open. When Rambo separated from the group to locate Sarah, he volunteered to wait for him while the rest of the group made their escape; this proved to be a fortunate decision, as his sniper rifle saved Rambo and Sarah from being killed by a Tatmadaw patrol. He was later entrusted with Sarah's safety, when Rambo took a series of actions to thwart Tatmadaw's attempt to hunt for them. He and Sarah remained undetected by the Tatmadaw troops upon the Tatmadaw defeat, due in part to Rambo's efforts).

=== Reese ===
Reese (Jake La Botz), nicknamed Tombstone, is one of the fellow mercenaries (and the only American) hired to recover the Christian missionaries abducted by the Tatmadaw. It is implied that he is former United States Army; his arms are covered in tattoos and he was wearing a camouflaged vest, speaks with a Southern accent and called himself "just some grunt". He also wields an M4A1 carbine with an M203 grenade launcher. Reese annoyed everyone, especially Lewis, by singing the song "The Wishing Well". It is believed that Reese survived the final gunfight but he is severely injured and lying amidst the wreckage with Lewis. He is on his knees looking up by Lewis.

=== En-Joo ===
En-Joo (Tim Kang) is one of the fellow mercenaries hired to recover the Christian missionaries abducted by the Tatmadaw. He was killed when Tatmadaw soldier tossed at grenade despite Lewis's efforts to stop that soldier. He was armed with Sig 552 Commando carbine.

=== Diaz ===
Diaz (Rey Gallegos) is one of the fellow mercenaries hired to recover the Christian missionaries abducted by the Tatmadaw. A soldier on a boat with a flamethrower hits Diaz and he is burned severely. He armed himself with a DSA SA58.

=== Major Pa Tee Tint ===
Major Pa Tee Tint (Maung Maung Khin) is a Burmese Tatmadaw officer and a primary antagonist of Rambo. He is personally killed by Rambo, who disembowels him with a machete.

=== Myint ===
Myint is from the rebels provided guides for the mercenary group sent to rescue the captured missionaries. These guides, along with Rambo, ended up improvising a disguise as a truck-borne patrol for infiltrating the Tatmadaw base where the missionaries were held and tortured. During the climactic battle near the end of the film, the Karen rebels participated en masse to help turn the tide in favor of the mercenaries.

=== R. Rambo ===
R. Rambo, is the name found on a mailbox at the end of the movie Rambo. In an earlier scene, Sarah asks Rambo if he had any family back home. Rambo says that he thinks maybe his father is still alive. R. Rambo is presumably his father.

== Introduced in Rambo: Last Blood (2019) ==
=== Maria Beltran ===
Maria Beltran (Adriana Barraza) has been described as someone who is "like a sister" to Rambo and has worked on Rambo's father's farm all her life. Maria has a granddaughter Gabriela who helps her out on the farm. Gabriela is a nursing student.

=== Carmen Delgado ===
Carmen Delgado (Paz Vega) is an independent reporter covering the drug trade in Mexico. She aids Rambo after her younger half-sister was kidnapped and killed by a Mexican cartel.

=== Hugo Martinez ===
Hugo Martinez (Sergio Peris-Mencheta) is the leader of a Mexican cartel and the main antagonist of Rambo: Last Blood.

=== Victor Martinez ===
Victor Martinez (Óscar Jaenada) is the co-leader of a Mexican cartel along with his brother Hugo and the secondary antagonist of Rambo: Last Blood.

=== Gabriela Beltran ===
Gabriela Beltran (Yvette Monreal) is Rambo's surrogate niece in Mexico who is kidnapped by a drug cartel. Rambo treats her like one of the family. Gabriela is a nursing student who went to Mexico to find her estranged father and why he left her.
