= Rambo (2008 video game) =

2008 arcade video game

- North American cover artwork featuring Sylvester Stallone as John Rambo
- Developer: Sega
- Publisher: Sega
- Series: Rambo franchise
- Platform: Arcade
- Release: JP: September 18, 2008
- Genre: Light gun shooter
- Modes: Single-player, Multiplayer
- Arcade system: Sega Lindbergh

Rambo is a light gun shooter developed by Sega for the arcades in 2008. The game is based on Rambo: First Blood Part II (1985) and Rambo III (1988), but not First Blood (1982).

== Gameplay ==
Gameplay of Rambo

The player assumes the role of John Rambo, fighting through five levels. The first and final levels are based on the desert battle from Rambo III, the second and third levels focus on Rambo rescuing the prisoners from Rambo: First Blood Part II, and the fourth level consists of Rambo rescuing his mentor, Col. Trautman, from an enemy prison (also from Rambo III). Each level consists of the player shooting down waves after waves of enemy soldiers; if the player waits too long to kill an enemy, the enemy will attack and the player will lose one of their lives. Some enemies attack Rambo with grenades or rockets, which can be shot and destroyed in mid-air.

In addition, the game also features non-shooting segments, such as defeating an enemy in hand-to-hand combat, sneaking past enemies without being spotted, and shooting targeted areas without missing. Failing to complete these segments properly results in the player either losing a life or having to fight more enemies. Every level includes a boss fight, such as the Soviet attack helicopter from Rambo III or the gunboats from Rambo: First Blood Part II, which require the player to avoid a series of attacks while waiting for an opportunity to damage and ultimately defeat the boss.

The player's primary weapon must either be reloaded by shooting off-screen or by completely running out of bullets. Killing enemies slowly fills Rambo's "Rage" meter, which when activated increases the damage the player inflicts until the meter is empty. If the meter is activated when it's completely full, the player becomes temporarily invincible and cannot be damaged. Shooting crates in levels allows the player to obtain medals that boost their score, which is calculated based on how much damage they take during a level, the speed at which they kill enemies, and how accurate their shooting is. At the end of the level, the game rates the player, with a high score earning them extra lives.

The Japanese version of the arcade uses the Ingram submachine gun from The House of the Dead 4 while the English International version uses the submachine gun from Ghost Squad.

== Development ==
The game runs on the Sega Lindbergh system board. The arcade cabinet features a 62-inch screen.

The game was released in Japanese arcades on September 18, 2008.

== Reception ==
Jean Snow from Wired enjoyed playing it, speaking positively about shooting the Uzi gun controller. GamesTM said "[i]t makes for a solid, pulse-pounding shooter that's a blast to play through once or twice but is unlikely to stand up to repeat play." Anthony Burch from Destructoid called it the dumbest game ever. Serkan Toto for TechCrunch, while negative towards its graphics and gameplay, considered it to be “tons of stupid fun“. In 2023, Time Extension listed it as one of the best light gun games of all time.
