= Rambo (franchise) =

American media franchise

- Official franchise logo
- Created by: David Morrell
- Original work: First Blood (1972)
- Owners: Movies 1–3; StudioCanal; Movies 4–6; Lionsgate
- Years: 1972–present

Print publications
- Novel(s): List: First Blood (1972); Rambo: First Blood Part II (1985); Rambo III (1988)
- Comics: List: Rambo: Vietnam Hero (1986); Rambo Adventures (1986); Rambo III (1988); Rambo (1989); First Kill (2022)

Films and television
- Film(s): List: Original series; First Blood (1982); Rambo: First Blood Part II (1985); Rambo III (1988); Rambo (2008); Rambo: Last Blood (2019) Prequel; John Rambo (2027)
- Animated series: Rambo: The Force of Freedom (1986)

Games
- Video game(s): List: Rambo (1985); Rambo: First Blood Part II (1986); Rambo (1987); Rambo III (1989); Rambo III (1989); Rambo (2008); Rambo: The Video Game (2014)

Audio
- Soundtrack(s): List: First Blood (1982); Rambo: First Blood Part II (1985); Rambo III (1988); Rambo (2008); Rambo: Last Blood (2019)

Miscellaneous
- Toy(s): List of toys
- Character(s): List of characters

Rambo is an American media franchise centered on a series of action films featuring John Rambo. The five films are First Blood (1982), Rambo: First Blood Part II (1985), Rambo III (1988), Rambo (2008), and Rambo: Last Blood (2019), with a sixth, John Rambo, in the works. Its titular protagonist is a United States Army Special Forces veteran played by Sylvester Stallone, whose Vietnam War experience traumatized him but also gave him superior military skills, which he has used to fight corrupt police officers, enemy troops and drug cartels. First Blood is an adaptation of the 1972 novel First Blood by David Morrell.

Though critical reception was mixed, the film series has grossed $819 million in total, $300 million of which is from the most successful film, Rambo: First Blood Part II. Stallone co-wrote the screenplays of all five films, and directed Rambo (2008), the fourth film of the series. The franchise also spawned an animated series Rambo: The Force of Freedom (1986), as well as comic books, novels and video games.

== Films ==
Film	U.S. release date	Director(s)	Screenwriter(s)	Story by	Producer(s)
Original series
First Blood	October 22, 1982	Ted Kotcheff	Michael Kozoll, William Sackheim & Sylvester Stallone	Michael Kozoll, William Sackheim & Sylvester Stallone	Buzz Feitshans
Rambo: First Blood Part II	May 22, 1985	George P. Cosmatos	James Cameron & Sylvester Stallone	Kevin Jarre	Buzz Feitshans
Rambo III	May 25, 1988	Peter MacDonald	Sheldon Lettich & Sylvester Stallone	Sheldon Lettich & Sylvester Stallone	Buzz Feitshans
Rambo	January 25, 2008	Sylvester Stallone	Art Monterastelli & Sylvester Stallone	Art Monterastelli & Sylvester Stallone	Avi Lerner, John Thompson & Kevin King-Templeton
Rambo: Last Blood	September 20, 2019	Adrian Grünberg	Matthew Cirulnick & Sylvester Stallone	Dan Gordon & Sylvester Stallone	Avi Lerner, Les Weldon, Yariv Lerner & Kevin King-Templeton
Prequel
John Rambo	June 4, 2027	Jalmari Helander	Rory Haines & Sohrab Noshirvani	TBA	Avi Lerner, Les Weldon, Jonathan Yunger & Kevin King-Templeton

=== First Blood (1982) ===
Upon returning to the United States, Vietnam veteran John Rambo has difficulty adjusting to civilian life and wanders the country as a drifter for almost a decade. In December 1981, Rambo travels to a small town in rural Washington in search of a fellow U.S. Army Green Beret buddy. He learns that his friend died from cancer the previous summer due to exposure to Agent Orange.

He attempts to find a diner in town, and maybe a temporary job. The town sheriff Will Teasle (Brian Dennehy) presumes him to be a drifter. Rambo disobeys the sheriff's order to stay away from town, and is promptly charged with vagrancy and subject to harassment and brutality from the deputies.

The police brutality triggers flashbacks of Rambo's memories of his torture at the hands of the North Vietnamese when he was a prisoner of war. Rambo fights his way out of the sheriff's department with his field knife and makes his way into the wilderness. A manhunt ensues, with the sheriff and his deputies all badly wounded. Rambo throws a rock at a helicopter in self-defense, causing the pilot to lose control and an officer to fall out. The State Police and National Guard are called in.

Colonel Samuel Trautman (Richard Crenna), Rambo's former commanding officer, arrives. He suggests giving Rambo a chance to escape; if Rambo is allowed to slip away, he'll be given time to calm down and he can be arrested without incident. Teasle allows Trautman to contact Rambo through a stolen police radio, but Rambo refuses to surrender.

The authorities reject Trautman's recommendation for a wait-and-see attitude and continue the manhunt, and Rambo's subsequent rampage culminates in him returning to town with guns and bombs from a commandeered Army truck. This results in the destruction of the sheriff's office and more of the town's main street. Rambo stands poised to eliminate the sheriff, but Trautman confronts Rambo face to face, and convinces his former soldier to surrender to the authorities.

=== Rambo: First Blood Part II (1985) ===
Between the first and second films, Rambo is convicted and remanded to a civilian maximum-security prison where hard labor is the norm. Despite being a convict, the rigid routine and discipline of prison life provides Rambo with some measure of much-needed stability, as it reminds him of his past in the military and its own rigid hierarchy.

The film opens with Colonel Samuel Trautman (Richard Crenna) offering Rambo his freedom if Rambo will return to Vietnam to search for American prisoners of war remaining in Vietnamese captivity. Marshall Murdock (Charles Napier), the official in charge of the mission, is portrayed as a corrupt political figure who doesn't want to expose the truth. Rambo is not to engage the enemy and instead is ordered to take photographs of a North Vietnamese camp, the same camp he himself had been held prisoner in, to prove to the American public there are no more POWs in Vietnam, although Murdock knows that there are.

Rambo is flown into the country with the purpose of parachuting into the jungle, but a malfunction during his exit from the plane causes him to have to cut away much of his equipment. He then meets his in-country contact, anti-communist Vietnamese rebel Co Bao (Julia Nickson), who is serving as an intelligence agent. Rambo discovers that there are POWs being held in the camp where he was dropped and that POWs were rotated between camps. Rambo breaks one POW out of the camp and attempts to escape, only to be abandoned at the moment of a pick up by helicopter on a hilltop on the orders of Murdock, after which both he and the POW are recaptured by the Vietnamese soldiers. Rambo is immobilized in a pit of sewage and leeches, then tortured by Soviet soldiers, who are allied with the Vietnamese and training Vietnamese soldiers. Co enters the base under the guise of a prostitute for hire, where she aids Rambo in escaping. After Rambo expresses his deepest gratitude for his rescue, the two share a kiss, after Co implores him to take her back to America with him. As they prepare to move on, Co is shot by surprise gunfire.

Enraged, Rambo then acts on his own initiative and starts a one-man war, hunting the Vietnamese and Soviet soldiers searching for him in the jungle and stealing a Soviet-captured helicopter. He flies the helicopter back to the camp, destroying it and killing the remaining Vietnamese and Soviet soldiers in the camp. He frees all the POWs and is pursued by a Soviet Mi-24 Hind helicopter. After destroying the Hind with an RPG, he returns to the US base in Thailand with all the POWs. Rambo is enraged at how the United States government has ignored the existence of surviving soldiers being held captive, and grabs an M-60 machine gun and proceeds into the headquarters building, destroying all of the electronic gear within. Rambo then threatens Murdock and tells him to be forthright with the American public regarding the truth of the POWs and to spare no expense in rescuing them all, or else he will return for Murdock. When Trautman says Rambo will be honored once again, he declines, saying the POWs deserve the accolades more. For his actions in Vietnam, Rambo is granted a presidential pardon and decides to remain in Thailand.

=== Rambo III (1988) ===
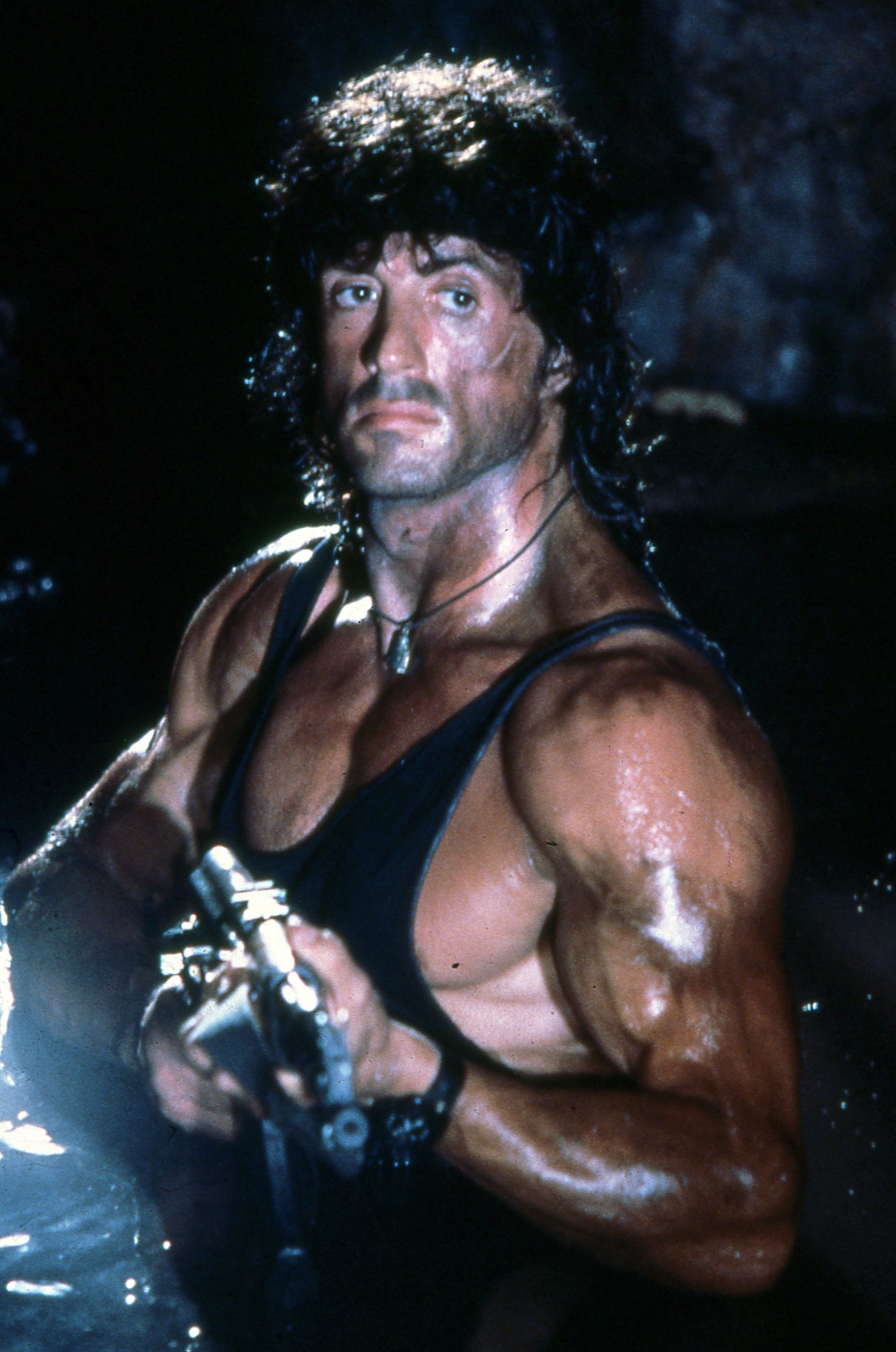
Sylvester Stallone as John Rambo in Rambo III (1988)

The film opens with Colonel Samuel Trautman (Richard Crenna) returning to Thailand to once again enlist Rambo's help. After witnessing Rambo's victory in a stick-fighting match, Trautman visits the temple Rambo is helping to build and asks him to join him on a mission to Afghanistan. This brings Rambo into the realm of the CIA's Special Activities Division which primarily hires Army Special Forces soldiers. The mission is meant to supply weapons, including FIM-92 Stinger missiles, to Afghan freedom fighters, the Mujahideen, who are fighting the Soviets. Despite having been shown photos of civilians suffering under Soviet rule, Rambo refuses and Trautman chooses to go on his own.

While in Afghanistan, Trautman's troops are ambushed by Soviet troops while passing through the mountains at night. Trautman is imprisoned in a Soviet base and tortured for information by commanding officer Zaysen (Marc de Jonge) and his henchman Kourov (Randy Raney). Rambo learns of the incident from embassy field officer Robert Griggs (Kurtwood Smith) and immediately flies to Pakistan where he meets up with Mousa (Sasson Gabai), a weapons supplier who agrees to take him to a village deep in the Afghan desert, close to the Soviet base where Trautman is kept. The Mujahideen in the village are already hesitant to help Rambo in the first place, but are convinced not to help him when their village is attacked by Soviet helicopters after one of Mousa's shop assistants informed the Russians of Rambo's presence. Aided only by Mousa and a young boy named Hamid (Doudi Shoua), Rambo makes his way to the Soviet base and starts his attempts to free Trautman. The first attempt is unsuccessful and results in Hamid getting shot in the leg, and Rambo himself getting hit by wooden shrapnel. After escaping from the base, Rambo tends to Hamid's wounds and sends him and Mousa away to safety.

The next day, Rambo returns to the base once again, just in time to rescue Trautman from being tortured with a flamethrower. After rescuing several other prisoners, Rambo steals a helicopter and escapes from the base. The helicopter crashes and Rambo and Trautman are forced to continue on foot. After a confrontation in a cave, where Rambo and Trautman kill several Russian soldiers including Kourov, they are confronted by an entire army of Russian tanks, headed by Zaysen. Just as they are about to be overwhelmed by the might of the Soviet Army, the Mujahideen warriors, together with Mousa and Hamid, ride onto the battlefield in a cavalry charge, overwhelming the Russians despite their numerical and technological superiority. In the ensuing battle, in which both Trautman and Rambo are wounded, Rambo manages to kill Zaysen by driving a tank into the helicopter in which Zaysen is flying.

At the end of the battle Rambo and Trautman say goodbye to their Mujahideen friends and leave Afghanistan to go home.

=== Rambo (2008) ===
The film opens with news footage of the crisis in Burma. Burma (also known as Myanmar) is under the iron fist rule of Than Shwe and takes harsher stances against the nation's pro-democracy movement. Rebels are thrown into a mine-infested marsh and then gunned down by a Burmese army unit, overseen by Major Pa Tee Tint.

Former U.S. soldier John Rambo still lives in Thailand, now residing in a village near the Burmese border and makes a living capturing snakes and selling them in a nearby village. A missionary, Michael Burnett (Paul Schulze), asks Rambo to take him and his associates down the Salween River to Burma on a humanitarian mission to help the Karen people. Rambo initially refuses but is convinced by another missionary in the group, Sarah Miller (Julie Benz), to take them.

The boat is stopped by pirates who demand Sarah in exchange for passage. After taking advantage of the pirates' complacency, Rambo kills them all. Although his actions save the missionaries, it greatly disturbs them. Upon arrival, Michael says that they will travel by road and will not need Rambo's help for the return trip. The mission goes well until the Burmese army, led by Major Tint, attacks the village, killing most of the villagers and two missionaries, and capturing the rest. When the missionaries fail to come back after ten days, their pastor, Arthur Marsh (Ken Howard), comes to Rambo to ask for his help in guiding hired mercenaries to the village where the missionaries were last seen.

Troubled by Sarah's potential fate, Rambo decides to accompany the soldiers. After seeing the destroyed village filled with mutilated humans and animals, the mercenaries spot some soldiers forcing several surviving villagers to run through a minefield. The mercenaries are hesitant to rescue the villagers, but not Rambo, who shoots the soldiers with a bow and arrow. Rambo reminds his colleagues of the rescue mission and encourages the team to move on. Hijacking a truck, they create a plan to save the hostages at the P.O.W. camp, doing so within fifteen minutes to avoid alerting the army. Rambo helps Sarah and the others to escape.

The Burmese Army (Tatmadaw) unit finds their hostages missing and organizes a massive manhunt. Everyone except for Rambo, Sarah, and "School Boy" (Matthew Marsden), the mercenary team's sniper, is captured. Just as the group is to be executed, Rambo hijacks a truck-mounted .50-caliber machine gun and engages the Burmese army. A group of Karen rebels joins the fight to help Rambo and the mercenaries defeat the Burmese unit. Seeing that the battle is lost, Major Tint decides to flee, only to run into Rambo's machete, which Rambo then uses to disembowel the Major.

Encouraged by Sarah's words, Rambo returns to the United States. The last scene shows him walking along a rural highway, past a horse farm and a rusted mailbox with the name "R. Rambo" on it. He makes his way down the gravel driveway as the credits roll.

=== Rambo: Last Blood (2019) ===
Eleven years after the events in Burma, Vietnam War veteran John Rambo lives in Bowie, Arizona at his deceased father's horse ranch, which he manages with his old friend, Maria Beltran, and her granddaughter, Gabriela. Gabriela tells Rambo that a friend of hers, Gizelle, has found Gabriela's biological father, Miguel, in Mexico. Both Rambo and Maria tell her not to go to Mexico, but Gabriela secretly drives there to ask Miguel why he abandoned her and her mother years ago. Gizelle leads Gabriela to Miguel's apartment, where he coldly tells her that he never really cared for Gabriela or her mother.

Gizelle takes a heartbroken Gabriela to a nearby club, where Gabriela is drugged and kidnapped by the enforcers of a Mexican cartel. Meanwhile, Maria informs Rambo of Gabriela's disappearance in Mexico. Rambo rushes to Mexico and interrogates both Miguel and Gizelle about Gabriela's whereabouts. Gizelle reluctantly leads Rambo to the club where Gabriela was last seen and confronts El Flaco, the man who last spoke with Gabriela. A mysterious woman, Carmen Delgado, tails Rambo as El Flaco leads him to Gabriela's location. Rambo is immediately confronted, beaten and marked by the cartel, led by the brothers Hugo and Victor Martinez. They take his driver's license with the location of Rambo's ranch and a photo of Gabriela, whom Victor recognizes. The cartel vow to mistreat Gabriela further due to Rambo's actions.

Carmen takes Rambo back to her home where she cares for him until he fully recovers after four days. While Rambo is cared for by Carmen, Gabriela is stripped and consistently dosed with heroin and sold to be raped repeatedly. Carmen says she is an independent journalist who has been investigating the Martinez brothers, who kidnapped and murdered her sister. Rambo later raids one of the brothels, killing several men until he finds a drugged Gabriela. While driving back home in his pickup, Rambo thanks Gabriela for giving him hope for ten years but she dies from the forced overdose. An enraged Rambo sends Maria away and rigs the ranch with traps for a confrontation, and later returns to Mexico to ask Carmen's help in finding Victor. Carmen initially refuses and tells Rambo that it will solve nothing, but is convinced after he appeals to her grief and frustration.

Rambo raids Victor's home, killing several guards and decapitating Victor. In retaliation, Hugo leads a large train of 7 SUVs filled with hitmen to Rambo's ranch, but each eventually falls victim to Rambo's rigged traps. Saving Hugo for the last, Rambo mutilates him and rips his heart out, killing him instantly. In the aftermath, a weakened Rambo sits on the porch of his father's house, vowing to continue fighting and keep the memories of his loved ones alive. During the credits, flashbacks to scenes from the first four movies in the franchise are shown, with Rambo finally saddling up his horse and riding off into the sunset.

=== John Rambo (2027) ===
In June 2019 at Cannes, Sylvester Stallone stated he would continue portraying John Rambo if the fifth film succeeds. Adrian Grunberg, however, said that Rambo: Last Blood "closes the circle" and concludes the film series. In September 2019, Stallone expressed interest in a sixth Rambo film, where the character takes refuge at a Native American reservation. Stallone later elaborated that the story would explore Rambo's return to the reservation where he had grown up.

In May 2025, it was announced that Millennium Media was producing a prequel film to First Blood titled John Rambo. Jalmari Helander, known for the 2022 film Sisu, has been attached to direct the film, while Stallone is not expected to be involved with the film in any capacity. The director shared:

I have been the biggest fan of Rambo since the age of 11. It is so surreal to be in a situation where I can actually make my own Rambo movie. The chain of events that got me here makes, in a fantastic way, my whole childhood make sense. I can’t wait to bring the greatest action hero back to the big screen where he belongs.

In August 2025, actor Noah Centineo was cast as John Rambo. Stallone had also considered playing the young Rambo himself, with the help of AI, to transform into the role, saying:

I wanted to do the first AI… not retroactive… but I wanted to rewrite history of the earlier Rambo because I wanted Rambo to be the nicest guy in the school, the valedictorian, the prom king, and all that stuff. And when he goes to Vietnam, he thinks it's going to be a three-week hit-and-run, and you see him being tortured and captured, his friends murdered, one thing after another, and [his] life in Saigon. And that's how I became the way I became, but originally I was bon vivant–that kind of thing. And I thought, "We could do this with AI," but [we] procrastinated too long and they took it over and, I hope, you know, good luck.

In November 2025, it was announced that Lionsgate had acquired global distribution rights to the film. It was also reported that Angela Russo-Otstot and Michael Disco would produce the film for AGBO, alongside Kevin King Templeton, Les Weldon, and Jonathan Yunger for Millennium Media, with the Russo brothers as executive producers.

The prequel is set during the Vietnam War and will be filmed in Thailand, with the screenplay written by Rory Haines and Sohrab Noshirvani. Production is anticipated to begin in early 2026.

== Television ==
Series	Season	Episodes	First released	Last released	Showrunner(s)	Network(s)
Rambo: The Force of Freedom	1	65	September 15, 1986	December 26, 1986	Ruby-Spears	Broadcast syndication

=== Rambo: The Force of Freedom (1986) ===
Rambo: The Force of Freedom was an animated series that ran in 1986 in which John Rambo leads a team called The Force of Freedom to fight an evil organization called S.A.V.A.G.E. (short for Specialist-Administrators of Vengeance, Anarchy and Global Extortion). 65 episodes were aired. Rambo: The Force of Freedom spawned a line of toys.

=== Future ===
In August 2013, it was announced that a Rambo television series was in development. The project was stated to include Avi Lerner and Sylvester Stallone in creative capacities. Stallone was contractually in negotiations to reprise his role from the film series, with John Morayniss and Lerner serving as executive producers. Lerner described the project as "the next phase of the Rambo legacy." The series was stated to be a joint-venture production between Nu Image, Millennium Media and eOne, while being shopped around to various television networks. By December 2015, the series was ordered by FOX Network and was officially titled Rambo: New Blood. Written by Jeb Stuart, the series would center around the complex relationship between John Rambo and an ex-Navy SEAL named J.R., his estranged son. Stallone and Stuart joined the production as additional executive producers. Later that month, Stallone stated that he would pass on reprising his role.

By October 2016, the project was temporarily repurposed as a described reboot film with the same title. Ariel Vromen joined the production as director, with a script written by Brooks McLaren. The project never materialized, in favor of Rambo: Last Blood. In November 2018, David Morrell revealed that he was commissioned by Stallone to write the script for the television series, after the previous attempts at launching the project had not succeeded. Morrell stated that the reason it had never been filmed, is that creatives had a difficult time understanding the story; reiterating that Rambo's son was an ex-Navy SEAL civilian, and comparing the character to The Equalizer. Miramax Television was attached to the project during his involvement.

In September 2019, Stallone announced plans for a prequel project. Though he would not reprise the title role, he would like to explore who Rambo was before the war: "the perfect guy", a Jim Thorpe-type super athlete captain of the sports team, and popular kid at school. Stallone stated that the series would explore the juxtaposition that took place, to show that joining the military and involved in war, completely changed John Rambo. Stallone later teamed with author Chuck Dixon to tell this story in the form of a graphic novel entitled "First Kill".

In November 2021, Head of Millennium Media Jeffrey Greenstein announced that the studio is once again actively developing a Rambo television series. By November 2022, Stallone stated that development on the prequel series is ongoing. He said that he would like the project to resemble a Vietnam documentary, with the series showing how war changes a person. The plot has John Rambo change from being popular athlete, to what he became in the film series. He also stated that the project may end in modern-day, where he "pass[es] the torch", which may resemble the original Rambo: New Blood project.

== Cast and crew ==
=== Cast ===
List indicators

This section includes characters who will appear or have appeared in the franchise.

- An empty grey cell indicates the character was not in the film, or that the character's official presence has not yet been confirmed.
- ^{A} indicates an appearance through archival footage or audio.
- ^{C} indicates a cameo role.
- ^{U} indicates an uncredited appearance.
- ^{V} indicates a voice-only role.
- ^{Y} indicates a younger version of the character.

Character	Original series					Prequel	Animated series
Character	First Blood	Rambo: First Blood Part II	Rambo III	Rambo	Rambo: Last Blood	John Rambo	Rambo: The Force of Freedom
Character	1982	1985	1988	2008	2019	2027	1986
John J. Rambo	Sylvester Stallone	Sylvester Stallone	Sylvester Stallone	Sylvester Stallone	Sylvester Stallone	Noah Centineo	Neil Ross^{V}
Colonel Samuel R. "Sam" Trautman	Richard Crenna	Richard Crenna	Richard Crenna	Richard Crenna^{A}	Richard Crenna^{A}	David Harbour	Alan Oppenheimer^{V}
Sheriff William "Will" Teasle	Brian Dennehy			Brian Dennehy^{A}	Brian Dennehy^{A}		
Deputy Sergeant Arthur "Art" Galt	Jack Starrett			Jack Starrett^{A}			
Deputy Mitch Rogers	David Caruso						
Deputy Lester	Alf Humphreys						
Captain Dave Kern	Bill McKinney						
Lieutenant Clinton Morgen	Patrick Stack						
Agent Co Phuong Bao		Julia Nickson					
Banks		Andy Wood		Andy Wood^{A}	Andy Wood^{A}		
Major Marshall Roger T. Murdock		Charles Napier					
Michael Reed Ericson		Martin Kove					
Lifer		Steve Williams					
Lieutenant Colonel Sergei T. Podovsky		Steven Berkoff					
Sergeant Yushin		Voyo Goric					
Lieutenant Tay		George Cheung		George Cheung^{A}			
Captain Vinh		William Ghent					
Robert Griggs		Kurtwood Smith					
Mousa Ghani		Sasson Gabai					
Masoud			Spiros Focás				
Hamid			Doudi Shoua	Doudi Shoua^{A}			
Colonel Alexei Zaysen			Marc de Jonge				
Sergeant Kourov				Randy Raney			
Sarah Miller				Julie Benz			
Dr. Michael Burnett				Paul Schulze			
"School Boy"				Matthew Marsden			
Lewis				Graham McTavish			
Reese				Jake La Botz			
Diaz				Rey Gallegos			
En-Joo				Tim Kang			
Father Arthur Marsh				Ken Howard			
Major Pa Tee Tint				Maung Maung Khin	Maung Maung Khin^{A}		
Lieutenant Aye				Aung Aay Noi			
Gabriela Beltran					Yvette Monreal		
Maria Beltran					Adriana Barraza		
Carmen Delgado					Paz Vega		
Hugo Martinez					Sergio Peris-Mencheta		
Victor Martinez					Óscar Jaenada		

=== Additional crew and production details ===
Film	Crew/Detail					
Film	Composer	Cinematographer	Editor	Production companies	Distributing company	Running time
First Blood	Jerry Goldsmith	Andrew Laszlo	Joan E. Chapman	Carolco Pictures; Anabasis Investments, N. V.	Orion Pictures	93 min
Rambo: First Blood Part II	Jerry Goldsmith	Jack Cardiff	Mark Helfrich; Mark Goldblatt	Carolco Pictures; Estudios Churubusco; Anabasis Investments, N. V.	TriStar Pictures	96 min
Rambo III	Jerry Goldsmith	John Stanier	James Symons; Andrew London; O. Nicholas Brown	Carolco Pictures	TriStar Pictures	101 min
Rambo	Brian Tyler	Glen MacPherson	Sean Albertson	Nu Image; Equity Pictures; Medienfonds GmbH & Co. KG IV	Lionsgate; The Weinstein Company	91 min Extended Cut: 99 min
Rambo: Last Blood	Brian Tyler	Brendan Galvin	Todd E. Miller; Carsten Kurpanek	Templeton Media; Millennium Media; Balboa Productions	Lionsgate	89 min International: 101 min

== Reception ==
=== Box office performance ===
Film	U.S. release date	Budget	Box office revenue		
Film	U.S. release date	Budget	United States	International	Worldwide
First Blood	October 22, 1982	$15 million	$47,212,904	$78,000,000	$125,212,904
Rambo: First Blood Part II	May 22, 1985	$25 million	$150,415,432	$149,985,000	$300,400,432
Rambo III	May 25, 1988	$58 million	$53,715,611	$135,300,000	$189,015,611
Rambo	January 25, 2008	$50 million	$42,754,105	$70,490,185	$113,244,290
Rambo: Last Blood	September 20, 2019	$50 million	$44,819,352	$46,671,001	$91,490,353
Total		$198 million	$338,906,479	$480,446,186	$819,363,590

=== Critical and public response ===
Film	Rotten Tomatoes	Metacritic	CinemaScore
First Blood	86% (49 reviews)	61 (15 reviews)	—N/a
Rambo: First Blood Part II	33% (45 reviews)	47 (15 reviews)	—N/a
Rambo III	39% (38 reviews)	36 (15 reviews)	B+
Rambo	38% (150 reviews)	46 (26 reviews)	A−
Rambo: Last Blood	26% (174 reviews)	26 (31 reviews)	B

=== Cultural impact ===
Among the Kamula of Wawoi Falls in Western Province, Papua New Guinea, Rambo was very popular in the late 1990s. His figure was imported into local legends.

== Music ==
Title	U.S. release date	Length	Composer(s)	Label
First Blood: Original Motion Picture Soundtrack	1982		Jerry Goldsmith	
Rambo: First Blood Part II (Original Motion Picture Soundtrack)	1985		Jerry Goldsmith	
Rambo III: Original Motion Picture Soundtrack	1988		Jerry Goldsmith	
Rambo: Original Motion Picture Soundtrack	January 22, 2008	75:59	Brian Tyler	Lionsgate
Rambo: Last Blood (Original Motion Picture Soundtrack)	September 20, 2019	75:03	Brian Tyler	Lakeshore

The original scores for the first three films were composed and conducted by Jerry Goldsmith. The music from the first and second films was performed by the National Philharmonic Orchestra and the music from the third by the Hungarian State Opera Orchestra. Goldsmith's main theme for Rambo was the basis for the end title song "It's a Long Road", performed by Dan Hill, part of the First Blood soundtrack.

== Home media ==
All five existing films in the Rambo franchise are available from Lionsgate by virtue of the studio's output deal with StudioCanal (the company that currently holds the underlying rights to the first three films) and Lionsgate itself co-producing the latter film (in partnership with The Weinstein Company). Paramount Pictures (via Paramount Worldwide Television Licensing & Distribution and Trifecta Entertainment & Media) holds the television rights to the first three films, while Debmar-Mercury handles television distribution for the latter film on behalf of parent company Lionsgate.

Title	Format	Release date	Films	Reference
Rambo Collector's Pack	DVD	July 24, 2001	First Blood, Rambo: First Blood Part II, Rambo III	
Rambo: The Complete Collector's Set	DVD, Blu-ray	July 27, 2010	First Blood, Rambo: First Blood Part II, Rambo III, Rambo	
Ultimate Rambo Collection	Blu-ray	October 28, 2013	First Blood, Rambo: First Blood Part II, Rambo III, Rambo	
Rambo Classic Trilogy Collection	DVD	January 1, 2014	First Blood, Rambo: First Blood Part II, Rambo III	
Rambo: Trilogy – The Ultimate Edition	Blu-ray	September 28, 2015	First Blood, Rambo: First Blood Part II, Rambo III	
Rambo Complete Collection	DVD	March 1, 2016	First Blood, Rambo: First Blood Part II, Rambo III, Rambo	
Rambo: Trilogy	DVD, Blu-ray	November 15, 2018	First Blood, Rambo: First Blood Part II, Rambo III	
Rambo: 5-Film Collection	Blu-ray	February 11, 2020	First Blood, Rambo: First Blood Part II, Rambo III, Rambo, Rambo: Last Blood	

== Other media ==
=== Novelizations ===
David Morrell, author of the original First Blood novel, wrote novelizations for the first two Rambo sequels. Morrell has said that he wrote the novelizations because he wanted to include characterization that is not in Rambo: First Blood Part II and Rambo III. Morrell did not write a novelization for the 2008 film, Rambo, as he said the film's characterization matched that of the original First Blood novel.

=== Toys ===
Rambo action figures have been produced by numerous manufacturers, most prominently Coleco and NECA. Sylvester Stallone has vehemently objected to marketing the Rambo franchise to children, so aside from the figure released as part of the adult-targeted Sylvester Stallone Legacy Collection, the manufacturers could not license Stallone's likeness; because of this, these figures were designed not to resemble Stallone too closely.

=== Trading cards ===
In 1985 Topps released a 66-card set featuring images from Rambo: First Blood Part II on the front and synopses of the film's plot on the back. Each trading card pack included a sticker from a set of 22 which assemble to form a puzzle of Rambo holding a machine gun.

To celebrate its 75th anniversary, in 2013 Topps released autographed cards from their various sets, including the Rambo: First Blood Part II set. The most common autograph in the set is by Julia Nickson, while the least common is by Sylvester Stallone.

=== Comic books ===
- Rambo: Vietnam Hero: This was published in 1986 by Pocketkomix, a Vietnamese publisher.
- Rambo Adventures: In 1986 an Italian series of comic books inspired by Rambo was published by Giorgio Pedrazzi.
- Rambo III: An adaptation of the film was published in 1988 by Blackthorne Publishing, with story by Bruce Jones and pencils by Charlie Baldorado.
- Rambo: Another Blackthorne comic, this one an original story, was published in 1989, written by Ron Fortier, with art by Aaron Lopresti and Donnie Jupiter.
- First Kill: In November 2022 an Indiegogo campaign launched for a new graphic novel depicting Rambo's first tour of duty in Vietnam, written by Sylvester Stallone and Chuck Dixon.

=== Video games ===
Various licensed video games for various arcade and home console systems have been released:

- Rambo; The first Rambo video game, it is based on Rambo: First Blood Part II and released in 1985 for the ZX Spectrum, Amstrad CPC, and Commodore 64.
- Rambo: First Blood Part II; based on Rambo: First Blood Part II. Released in 1986 for the Master System.
- Rambo; based on Rambo: First Blood Part II. Released in 1987 for the NES.
- Rambo III; based on Rambo III. Various games released in 1989 for Amiga, Amstrad CPC, Atari ST, Commodore 64, MS-DOS, MSX, ZX Spectrum, Mega Drive/Genesis, Master System, arcade.
- Rambo III; based on Rambo III. Released in 1989 for arcades, it is completely separate from the Rambo III released for home systems the same year.
- Rambo; based on Rambo: First Blood Part II and Rambo III. Released in 2008 in arcades by Sega. It is a 2-player light gun shooter.
- Rambo: The Video Game; based on First Blood, Rambo: First Blood Part II and Rambo III. Released in 2014 for Windows, Xbox 360, and PlayStation 3.

=== Other appearances ===
- Fight Klub: Rambo is a character in a trading card game published by Decipher, Inc.
- Family Guy: The Quest for Stuff: a freemium video game in which Rambo is an unlockable character.
- Broforce: a side-scrolling run-and-gun platform video game in which Rambo is an unlockable character.
- Mortal Kombat 11: a fighting game in which Rambo is a playable DLC character via downloadable content, with Sylvester Stallone reprising his role. In his arcade ending, Rambo defeated Kronika and planned to use her hourglass to right every wrong in history. As picking who lives and who dies would "kill his soul", Rambo walked away forever this time, stating "After all I've been through, I've earned a little peace".
- Call of Duty Warzone, Call of Duty: Black Ops Cold War and Call of Duty: Mobile featured the character as a time-limited DLC
- Rogue Company: a shooter game video game where Rambo is a character skin for the character Seeker

== Cancelled projects ==
In May 2013, Original Entertainment confirmed to have sealed a five-picture deal with Millennium Films to produce Bollywood remakes of First Blood, The Expendables, 16 Blocks, 88 Minutes, and Brooklyn's Finest, with the productions for First Blood and The Expendables expected to start at the end of that year.

In early 2016, Siddharth Anand was announced as the director and the film will be co-produced by Anand, Daljit DJ Parmar, Samir Gupta, Hunt Lowry, Saurabh Gupta and Gulzar Inder Chahal. The film will specifically remake First Blood and will follow the last member of an elite unit in the Indian Armed forces returning home only to discover a different war waiting for him, forcing Rambo to the jungles and mountains of the Himalayas and unleash mayhem and destruction.

In May 2017, Tiger Shroff was cast in the role of Rambo while production was scheduled for a late 2018 release date. By October 2017, the film was placed on hold while Shroff and Anand completed other projects.

The film was scheduled to be released in October 2020, with Shroff expected to star in Hindi remakes of all five films in the Rambo franchise. However, the film was delayed due to the COVID-19 pandemic. Rohit Dhawan is slated to direct, with the release date of the film is currently unknown.

== See also ==
- Syndicate Sadists, a Poliziotteschi film that predates First Blood
- Wild Blood, a Turkish copy film of First Blood
- Missing in Action, an American film inspired by Rambo: First Blood Part II
- Rampage, a Turkish copy film of Rambo: First Blood Part II
- Hot Shots! Part Deux, an American parody film of Rambo: First Blood Part II and Rambo III with colonel role reprised by Richard Crenna
- Son of Rambow, a British comedy film inspired by First Blood
- Second Blood, a Kuwaiti action film inspired by Rambo: First Blood Part II
