= First Blood (soundtrack) =

First Blood: Original Motion Picture Soundtrack

Film score by Jerry Goldsmith
- Released: 1982 (original release); 1988 (re-issue); November 22, 2010 (expanded edition)
- Genre: Film score
- Length: 36:38 (original release); 39:29 (re-issue); 87:04 (expanded edition)
- Labels: Regency Records (original release); Intrada Records (re-issue and expanded edition)
- Producers: David Paich; Jerry Goldsmith; Marty Paich; Bruce Botnick

Jerry Goldsmith chronology
The Challenge (1982)	First Blood (1982)	Psycho II (1983)

First Blood: Original Motion Picture Soundtrack is the original score to the 1982 war action film First Blood, composed by Jerry Goldsmith. The film, directed by Ted Kotcheff is based on the eponymous 1972 novel by David Morrell and starred Sylvester Stallone as the titular character. It is the first installment in the Rambo film series. Goldsmith composed the main theme "It's a Long Road" which has an instrumental and lyrical version, respectively. The theme recurrently appeared in the first three sequels. The album was originally released through Regency Records in 1982 and was reissued by Intrada Records which also released an expanded edition.

== Release history ==
The original 1982 album was published by Regency Records in LPs and cassettes the same time as the film's release. It featured eleven tracks, including the instrumental and lyrical version of "It's A Long Road", along with minimal cues from Goldsmith's score. Intrada Records released the album in CDs in 1988, which included an additional track "No Power" excluded from the initial release, while the album was further reissued by Varèse Sarabande in 2000s.

An expanded edition of the film score was released through Intrada Records on November 23, 2010, in a double disc format. The first disc featured the complete score of 19 tracks, while the second disc included the contents of the original 1982 release along with demo version of "It's the Long Road", music for the production company logo and the music used in the promotional trailer. This edition was again remastered by Intrada and re-released in May 2025.

== Critical reception ==
Christian Clemmensen of Filmtracks wrote "For all the lasting attention the action music in this franchise receives, First Blood is still anchored by its melancholy beauty."

Ben Sherlock of Screen Rant wrote "In First Blood, Goldsmith used Bernard Hermann-esque orchestrations to punctuate the on-screen tension. Goldsmith's somber main theme, "It's a Long Road," has been widely praised for helping to bring a sympathetic angle to the Rambo character." According to Jake Dee of JoBlo.com, he described the main musical theme "It's a Long Road" adding "The musical theme is proud and patriotic to being, but also has a hint of somber wistfulness as well. The combination perfectly echoes Rambo's vexed psyche, and continues to reiterate his state of mind as the film unspools. It works so well because it's never too obvious."

== Track listing ==
=== Regency Records original release (1982) ===
No.	Title	Length
1.	"It's A Long Road" (lyrics by Hal Shaper; vocals by Dan Hill)	3:19
2.	"Escape Route"	2:40
3.	"First Blood"	4:37
4.	"The Tunnel"	4:03
5.	"Hanging On"	3:30
6.	"Home Coming"	2:22
7.	"Mountain Hunt"	6:06
8.	"My Town"	1:55
9.	"The Razor"	3:09
10.	"Over the Cliff"	2:04
11.	"It's A Long Road" (instrumental)	2:53
Total length:		36:38

=== Intrada Records re-issue (1988) ===
No.	Title	Length
12.	"No Power"	2:51
Total length:		39:29

=== Intrada Records expanded edition (2010) ===
Disc 1
No.	Title	Length
1.	"Theme from First Blood" (Pop Orchestra Version)	4:10
2.	"Home Coming"	2:25
3.	"My Town"	1:02
4.	"Under Arrest"	0:48
5.	"The Razor"	2:39
6.	"A Head Start"	1:06
7.	"Hanging On"	2:06
8.	"Over the Cliff"	1:28
9.	"A Stitch in Time"	1:02
10.	"Mountain Hunt"	4:56
11.	"No Truce"	0:43
12.	"First Blood"	4:49
13.	"The Tunnel"	3:28
14.	"Escape Route"	2:41
15.	"The Truck"	1:02
16.	"No Power / Night Attack"	2:51
17.	"Hide and Seek"	1:00
18.	"It's A Long Road" (Instrumental)	3:27
19.	"It's A Long Road" (Theme from First Blood)	3:24
Total length:		45:07

Disc 2
No.	Title	Length
1.	"It's A Long Road" (Theme from First Blood)	3:25
2.	"Escape Route"	2:40
3.	"First Blood"	4:39
4.	"The Tunnel"	4:04
5.	"Hanging On"	3:29
6.	"Home Coming"	2:24
7.	"Mountain Hunt"	6:05
8.	"My Town"	1:58
9.	"The Razor"	3:10
10.	"Over the Cliff"	2:05
11.	"It's A Long Road" (Instrumental)	3:00
12.	"It's A Long Road" (Recording Session Piano / Vocal Demo)	3:21
13.	"Carolco Logo"	0:20
14.	"Rambo" (Special Summer 1984 Trailer)	1:17
Total length:		41:57

== Personnel ==
- Music composer and conductor: Jerry Goldsmith
- Music producer: David Paich, Jerry Goldsmith, Marty Paich, Bruce Botnick
- Arrangements: David Paich, Marty Paich, Arthur Norton
- Orchestrations: Arthur Norton
- Performed by: National Philharmonic Orchestra
- Engineer: Greg Ladanyi
- Assistant engineer: Judy Clapp
- Recording: Alan Snelling
- Mixing: Randy Tominaga

== Certifications ==
Region	Certification	Certified units/sales
Hong Kong (IFPI Hong Kong)	Gold	10,000^{*}
^{*} Sales figures based on certification alone.
