= Paul Schulze =

American actor

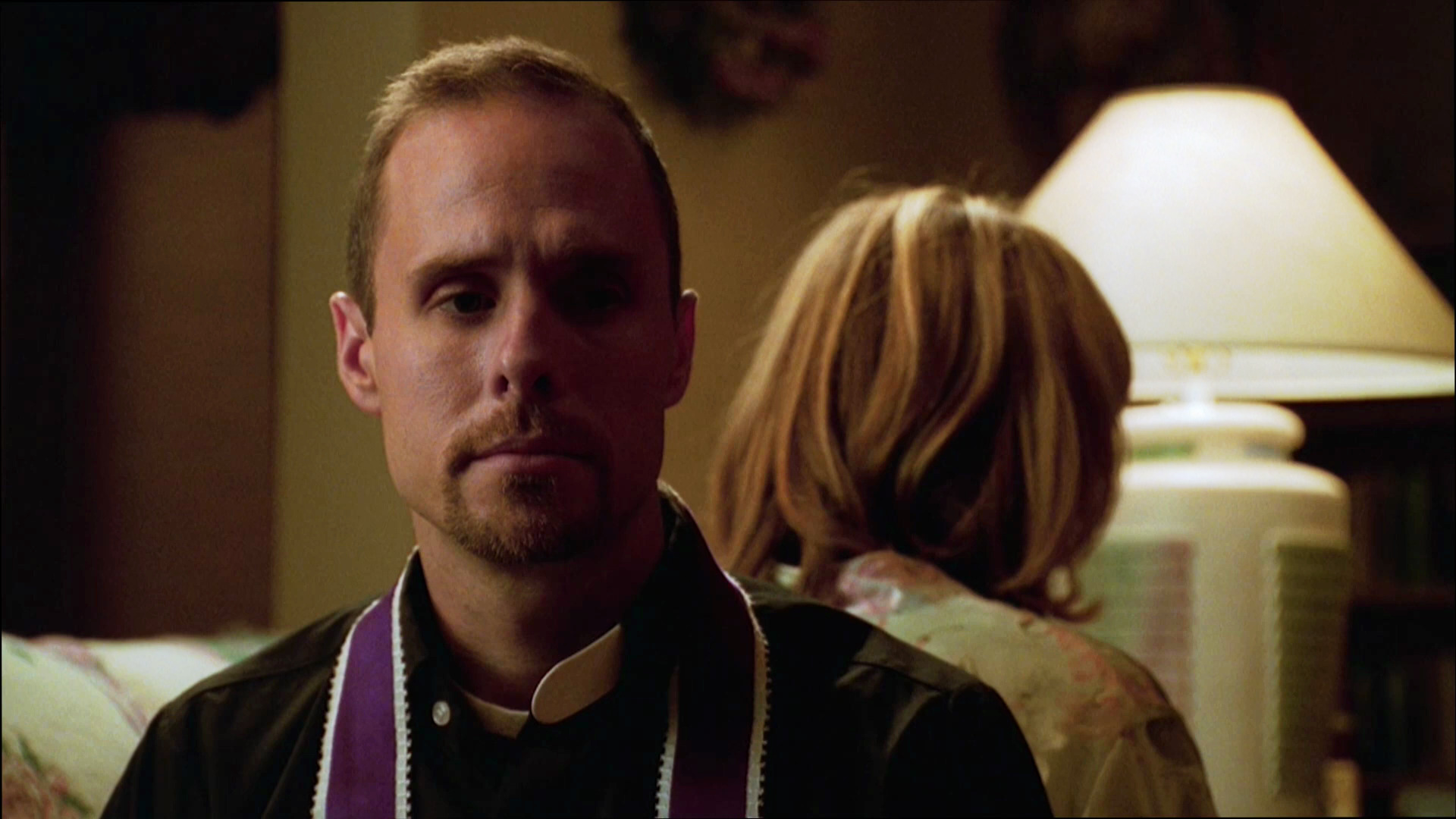
- Schulze as Father Phil Intintola in The Sopranos
- Born: June 12, 1962 (age 63); Livonia, Michigan, U.S.
- Education: State University of New York, Purchase (BFA)
- Occupation: Actor
- Years active: 1989–present

Paul Schulze (born June 12, 1962) is an American actor. He is known for appearing in The Sopranos, Nurse Jackie, 24 (2002–2004), and The Punisher (2017), and his film roles in Panic Room (2002), and Rambo (2008).

== Career ==
He is best known for portraying Ryan Chappelle on the Fox series 24 from 2001 to 2004 and Father Phil Intintola on the HBO series The Sopranos from 1999 to 2006. as well as portraying Eddie Walzer in Nurse Jackie, a Showtime series from 2009 to 2015.

Schulze was featured on Fox's legal drama Justice and has guest-starred on Law & Order, Rizzoli & Isles, JAG, CSI: Crime Scene Investigation, The West Wing, NCIS, Oz, Frasier, NYPD Blue, Boston Legal, Cold Case, Numb3rs, Mad Men, Criminal Minds, The Closer, Terminator: The Sarah Connor Chronicles, Suits, Z Nation, and Journeyman. He played William Rawlins in the Netflix series The Punisher in 2017.

Film appearances include New Jersey Drive (1995), Clockers (1995), Don't Say a Word (2001), and the David Fincher films Panic Room (2002) and Zodiac (2007). He appeared as Michael Burnett in Rambo, the 2008 fourth installment of the Rambo film saga. He co-starred as Eddie Walzer in the Showtime dark comedy series Nurse Jackie, which premiered in June 2009.

== Filmography ==
=== Film ===
Year	Title	Role	Notes
1989	The Unbelievable Truth	Bill	
1992	Laws of Gravity	Frankie	
1994	Amateur	Cop Who Shoots Thomas	
1994	Hand Gun	Michael McCallister	
1995	New Jersey Drive	Booking Sergeant	
1995	Clockers	Detective #4	
1995	Flirt		
1996	Illtown	Lucas	
1996	Layin' Low	Patty	
1997	Grind	Terry	
1998	The LaMastas		
1999	Kiss Toledo Goodbye	Nicky	
2000	Drowning Mona	Jimmy D.	
2001	Don't Say a Word	Jake	
2001	Speaking of Sex	Larry	
2001	Mimic 2	Phillip	
2002	Panic Room	Officer Rick Keeney	
2005	Crazylove	Thomas	
2007	Zodiac	Sandy Panzarella	
2008	Rambo	Dr. Michael Burnett	
2013	Are You Here	Dave Harken	
2019	Inside the Rain	David Glass	
TBA	The Requiem Boogie	Tolj	

=== Television ===
Year	Title	Role	Notes
1992, 1993, 1994, 2005, 2010, 2024	Law & Order	Garfield / EMS Medic / CSU Tech Horan / Randall / Det. Pete Milligan / Mr. Kralik / Keith Palmer	7 episodes
1993	Homicide: Life on the Street	Miles Stradinger	Episode: "Son of a Gun"
1995	New York Undercover	Ted Winters	Episode: "The Shooter"
1996	Swift Justice		Episode: "Out on a Limb"
1997	Dellaventura	Ronald	Episode: "In Deadly Fashion"
1997	Prince Street		Episode: "Everyday People"
1998	Oz	Officer Rick Heim	2 episodes
1999	NYPD Blue	Ronald Barrett	Episode: "Voir Dire This"
1999	Snoops	Mr. Sheridan	Episode: "Bedfellas"
1999	Judging Amy	Aaron Carter	Episode: "Near Death Experience"
1999–2006	The Sopranos	Father Phil Intintola	13 episodes
2000	Alien Fury: Countdown to Invasion	Jamison Collier	Television film
2001	Mimic 2	Phillip	Television film
2001	The Guardian	Derek Johnson	Episode: "Paternity"
2001	An American Town	Father Wright	Television film
2002	Spin City	Steven	Episode: "O Mother, Where Art Thou?"
2002	Grounded for Life	Kenny	Episode: "Is She Really Going Out with Walt?"
2002	Roswell	Man In Black	Episode: "Crash"
2002–2004	24	Ryan Chappelle	24 episodes
2003	Frasier	Alex	Episode: "Daphne Does Dinner"
2003	The Division	Lt. De Marco	Episode: "Testimonial"
2003	The Lone Ranger	Sheriff Landry	Television film
2004	Strong Medicine	Mayor Arnold Sweeney	Episode: "Cape Cancer"
2004	Without a Trace	Mr. Corcoran	Episode: "In the Dark"
2004	Medical Investigation	Mr. Kirkland	Episode: "Prince of Pleasure"
2004	The West Wing	Terrance Sligh	Episode: "The Dover Test"
2005	JAG	Major Try Atkins	Episode: "Death at the Mosque"
2005	Inconceivable	Nate Samuels	Episode: "Balls in Your Court"
2005	Numbers	Photographer	Episode: "Obsession"
2005	CSI: NY	Luke Robertson	Episode: "Corporate Warriors"
2005	Close to Home	James Pritchard	Episode: "Meth Murders"
2006	Cold Case	JC #3 / Phil Jorgensen	Episode: "Dog Day Afternoon"
2006	NCIS	Major Ken Meyers	Episode: "Bait"
2006	CSI: Crime Scene Investigation	Surgeon	Episode: "Way to Go"
2006	Shark	Ted Jeffries	Episode: "In the Grasp"
2006	Standoff	Dale Steckler	Episode: "Peer Group"
2006	The Closer	Richard Branch	2 episodes
2006	Justice	ADA J.D. Keller	3 episodes
2007	The Nine	Mike Moss	Episode: "Legacy"
2007	Mad Men	Hobo	Episode: "The Hobo Code"
2007	Boston Legal	JAG Schoenewics	Episode: "Do Tell"
2007	Journeyman	Agent Richard Garrity	4 episodes
2008	Terminator: The Sarah Connor Chronicles	Carl Greenway	Episode: "Automatic for the People"
2008	Criminal Minds	Det. Ronnie Baleman	Episode: "A Higher Power"
2009–2015	Nurse Jackie	Eddie Walzer	Main role; 80 episodes
2009	The Cleaner	Harrison	2 episodes
2010, 2017	Law & Order: Special Victims Unit	Bill Lawrence / Patrick Holbart	2 episodes
2011	Fairly Legal	Steve Janks	Episode: "Priceless"
2012	Person of Interest	Gianni Moretti Jr.	Episode: "Flesh and Blood"
2012	Franklin & Bash	Eli Palmer	Episode: "650 to SLC"
2012, 2014	The Mentalist	John Hutton	2 episodes
2014	Chicago P.D.	Joseph Price	Episode: "The Weigh Station"
2015	Major Crimes	Owen Holland	Episode: "Sorry I Missed You"
2015, 2016	Rizzoli & Isles	Dr. Joe Harris	2 episodes
2016–2017	Suits	Frank Gallo	12 episodes
2017	The Punisher	William Rawlins III	8 episodes
2019	The Expanse	Esai Martin	5 episodes
2020	Tommy	Len Egan	3 episodes
2021	Truth Be Told	Bobby	Episode: "Ghosts at the Feast"
2021	Station 19	Tony	Episode: "100% or Nothing"
2023	Your Honor	Judge Doucet	2 Episodes
2024	Sugar	Miller	3 Episodes
2024	The Lincoln Lawyer	Detective Mark Whitten	3 Episodes
