= Rambo III (video game) =

- European SG cover artwork featuring Sylvester Stallone as John Rambo
- Developers: Taito (arcade); Sega (consoles); Ocean (computers)
- Publishers: Taito (arcade); Sega (consoles); Ocean/Taito (computers)
- Series: Rambo
- Platforms: Arcade, Master System, Mega Drive, Amiga, Amstrad CPC, Atari ST, Commodore 64, MS-DOS, MSX, ZX Spectrum
- Release: March 15, 1989 (arcade); 1989 (cports)
- Genre: Shooter

Rambo III is a series of video games based on the film Rambo III (1988). Like in the film, their main plots center on former Vietnam-era Green Beret John Rambo being recalled up to duty one last time to rescue his former commander, Colonel Sam Trautman, who was captured during a covert operation mission in Soviet-controlled Afghanistan. Taito released an arcade video game based on the film. The console versions were developed and published by Sega, the IBM PC compatible version was developed by Ocean and published by Taito, and Ocean developed and published the other home computer versions: Atari ST, Amiga, Spectrum, C64, Amstrad CPC.

== Ports ==
The Master System version, released in 1988, is a light gun shooter along the lines of Operation Wolf. The Light Phaser is supported.

The Mega Drive version, released in 1989, follows Rambo in six missions, in each one with various objectives. Besides finding the exit of the level, in some missions, prisoners must be freed or enemy ammunition supplies destroyed. Rambo is controlled from an overhead perspective and has several weapons at his disposal. Besides a machine gun that never runs out of ammo, he can use a knife for close range kills, set off timed bombs and use his famous longbow with explosive arrows. Ammunition for the bow and the bombs is limited and can be collected from dead enemies. Rambo himself, on the other hand, is vulnerable and can be killed after one hit.

After some of the missions, the perspective switches to a view behind Rambo and additional boss fights take place. Soviet tanks or helicopters must be destroyed using the bow. While aiming the bow, Rambo cannot move, but otherwise he can hide behind rocks or other obstacles from enemy fire. This is reminiscent of the Taito arcade game of the same name, which also had the player firing into the screen at helicopters and jeeps, but instead of just a single segment after each stage, the whole game is played out in this perspective.

The ZX Spectrum, Atari ST, Amiga, Commodore 64, and Amstrad CPC versions have three missions, and vary drastically from the console versions.

== Reception ==
Reception

Review scores
Publication	Score
Computer and Video Games	89% (Master System)
Computer Entertainer	6/8 (Master System)
Mega	74% (Mega Drive)
Mean Machines	86% (Mega Drive)

Computer and Video Games reviewed the Sega Master System version, stating this "Operation Wolf clone is definitely the best Light Phaser game available on the Sega."

UK magazine Mean Machines rated the game at 86% and described it as "All the fun and frolics of an abattoir, with plenty of exciting and addictive action."
