= Sam Trautman =

Fictional character in the Rambo franchise

- Rambo character
- Richard Crenna as Sam Trautman in Rambo: First Blood Part II (1985)
- First appearance: First Blood (1972)
- Last appearance: John Rambo (2027)
- Created by: David Morrell
- Portrayed by: Richard Crenna (First Blood, Rambo: First Blood Part II, Rambo III); David Harbour (John Rambo)
- Voiced by: Alan Oppenheimer (Rambo: The Force of Freedom)

In-universe information
- Full name: Samuel Richard Trautman
- Alias: Covey Leader (field names)
- Occupation: Colonel, United States Army
- Nationality: American

Colonel Samuel Richard Trautman is a fictional character in the Rambo novel and film series, and other media in the franchise. His first appearance was in David Morrell's novel First Blood. His character was expanded on in the film series where he was played by Richard Crenna.

The character has been variously described as a father figure to the main character, and as a symbol for the military or the American government and its relationship with soldiers. In the original novel of First Blood, Trautman serves as an allegory for "Uncle Sam", i.e., the United States Government which created Rambo to serve their military needs. In both First Blood and Rambo: First Blood Part II Trautman primarily exists as a background figure engaging in arguments with other figures who are pursuing or using Rambo for their own purposes, while in Rambo III, Trautman becomes a more central figure in the physical action of the film.

== Casting ==
Kirk Douglas was initially cast in the part, had been outfitted and shown up on the first day of shooting. Douglas had previously expressed displeasure with the scripted ending, and as filming commenced he decided more rewrites were required. Director Ted Kotcheff and producers Mario Kassar and Andrew G. Vajna strongly disagreed and Douglas left the production after 3 weeks. Rock Hudson was then offered the role, but was scheduled to undergo heart surgery and had to turn it down. Richard Crenna was then contacted and arrived on set the next day, learning his lines on the flight to the film set. Marketing stills of Kirk Douglas in the uniform of Col. Trautman exist and are now part of the extras on the DVD of First Blood.

== Fictional biography ==
=== Novel character ===
Trautman is first introduced as a character in the 1972 novel, First Blood. As Rambo is being hunted by Sheriff Wilfred Teasle, Trautman arrives and introduces himself as director of the Green Beret program that trained Rambo. Trautman helps reorganize the National Guard units to better track Rambo. In the end, when Rambo has returned to Teasle's town and both men have been mortally wounded, Trautman finishes Rambo off with a shotgun, and then tells the dying Teasle this.

Trautman's relationship to Rambo in the novel sharply contrasts that portrayed in the movie of the same name. In the book, Rambo barely remembers Trautman, and in fact, after hearing his voice, he strains to recall him. Trautman then identifies himself as "Director of the school that trained you" over the car radio. In the book, Rambo does not reply to him, and says to himself, "The Bastard. Turning on your own kind [referencing Trautman's assistance to Teasle]." Their one significant interaction comes at the end of the book, when Trautman tells Teasle that he "took the top of his [Rambo's] head off with this shotgun."

=== Film character ===
According to the DVD special features to the film First Blood, Trautman's dossier records him as being born on July 6, 1929, in Columbus, Ohio. He graduated from Hilldale High School in Columbus in 1946. Trautman began his career in the United States Army after completing officer training at the University of Texas in 1950, where he also graduated with a bachelor's degree in Sociology. Commissioned a second lieutenant, Trautman was an infantry officer stationed at Fort Bragg in North Carolina. He was promoted to captain in 1956 and later to major in 1959. Between 1960 and 1963, Trautman underwent cross-training and became a CIA officer. He went on to join Covert operations in Chile, Guatemala and Cuba.

Trautman first served in the Vietnam War as a First Division member of the Special Forces ("Green Berets") in 1964. He was first deployed to the Southern Vietnamese Theater May 1966. Four years later, he was promoted to colonel in 1970. From 1970 to 1973, Colonel Trautman was unit commander of "Team Delta" that included his boot camp protégé John Rambo. He directed CIA operations near the Cambodian border from 1973 to 1979. It is likely that between 1979 and 1982, Trautman was assigned stateside to work in the Department of Defense as he alluded in the film to Rambo he "wasn't spending much time in Bragg lately" as his superiors had him in Washington D.C. "shining a seat with his ass." As an accomplished combat officer Trautman was a recipient of several awards including the Distinguished Service Medal, the Silver Star, the Soldier's Medal, the Legion of Merit, two Bronze Stars, and the Purple Heart to name a few. At the time of Rambo's 1982 incident with local Washington state authorities, Trautman was listed as divorced with no children.

==== First Blood (1982) ====
Trautman is flown in from Fort Bragg to warn the Hope, Washington, sheriff's department of the extent of Rambo's fighting and survival capabilities once Rambo starts a one-man war against the brutal deputies. The officers do not take Trautman's warnings seriously, though Trautman is the only one who can effectively communicate with Rambo. One source notes that Trautman, when describing the situation to the local officials as "a war you can't win", was echoing warnings previously made against continuing involvement in the Vietnam War.

The relationship between the characters differs between the novel and the film. In the novel, it is explained that Rambo had never met Trautman in person, and had only heard Trautman's voice as a constant presence over the loudspeakers of the camp where Rambo was trained. In the film, Trautman states that he trained Rambo personally, and commanded him directly in Vietnam. At the end of the novel, with both Rambo and Teasle gravely wounded, Trautman shoots Rambo in the head, mercifully killing him. In the film, however, Trautman stops Rambo from killing Sheriff Teasle, listens to his traumatic war memories and persuades Rambo to surrender.

An alternate ending shot for the film had Trautman preparing to shoot Rambo at the end but unable to go through with it. Rambo then grabs Trautman's hand to force him to shoot, effectively committing suicide. This ending was scrapped after it did poorly with test audiences.

==== Rambo: First Blood Part II (1985) ====
After Rambo's rampage in First Blood, he was arrested and sentenced to hard labor in a prison quarry. Trautman is now a member of Delta Force and was part of the operation to rescue POWs in Vietnam. Trautman visits Rambo in prison and offers him an opportunity to get out by undertaking a mission. Trautman then uses his influence to have Rambo released from prison to join the mission in the Far East, so that Rambo can get a pardon. Trautman is initially more trusting in Marshall Murdock, the CIA bureaucrat overseeing the mission, than Rambo is, as Rambo catches Murdock in a lie about his service. When Rambo rescues a POW, Murdock realizes that his war profits may be in jeopardy and forces his people to abort the mission, allowing Rambo to be captured by the Vietnamese and their Soviet Russian allies. Trautman responds angrily, unable to help Rambo, but knowing that Rambo will survive and return for revenge. He argues with Murdock about the situation, warning him of Rambo's anger. After Rambo comes back to the base and gives Murdock an ultimatum to rescue the remaining POWs, Rambo shares a few words with Trautman before leaving, refusing Trautman's efforts to convince Rambo to return to the United States.

==== Rambo III (1988) ====
Trautman tracks John Rambo down to a Buddhist Monastery in the jungles of Thailand and tries to convince Rambo to join him on a mission in Afghanistan to supply Stinger missiles to the Afghan Mujahideen rebels, fighting the invading Soviet armies. Rambo refuses to join, because he wants to put his violent past behind him and start a new life, and Trautman understands. Trautman undertakes to deliver the shipment himself, but is captured by the Soviets in Afghanistan and Rambo decides to launch a one-man rescue mission into the Russian prison camp so he can get his only friend back home. Once again, Trautman's warnings about Rambo's brutality fall on deaf ears, and Trautman is saved by John. Trautman's role in Rambo III has been described as "a well-meaning, but naive extension of the broken and mismanaged American military system".

==== Later films ====
The character's fate after Rambo III was never explained in the 2008 film, Rambo, but because Richard Crenna died before the film was made, it can be assumed that Trautman died between Rambo III and Rambo. Sylvester Stallone himself explained that the character died the same day Richard Crenna died. Even though the role of Trautman was originally supposed to be recast with James Brolin, Stallone felt it would be disrespectful to replace Crenna. The fourth film, also titled Rambo, was dedicated to Crenna's memory. Trautman only appeared in this film in flashbacks using archive footage from the previous films.

In the 2019 installment Rambo: Last Blood, the character appears in archival footage during the credits.

==== John Rambo (2027) ====
In this film, Trautman will be portrayed by David Harbour.

== Other media ==
=== Later novelizations ===
The movie novelizations of Rambo: First Blood Part II and Rambo III were both also written by David Morrell, who insisted on ownership of the characters as part of the negotiations for the sale of the film rights to the first book, and was given more leeway than is typically provided to writers creating novelizations. He provided additional insight into Trautman and Rambo's complex friendship, revealing that Rambo confided his painful childhood memories from his abusive father to Trautman, and states that Trautman has become his real father.

=== Animated series ===
Sam Trautman was featured in the animated series, Rambo: The Force of Freedom, voiced by Alan Oppenheimer. Here, he is not only the commanding officer of Rambo, but also of his allies. He would call in Rambo and his allies to fight the criminal organization S.A.V.A.G.E. led by General Warhawk. The cartoon generated a mild controversy at the production studio, with writers wondering how they could present a child-friendly main character who was created as a troubled Vietnam War veteran suffering from posttraumatic stress disorder (PTSD). While some have alleged that the show used child psychologists who recommended that the cartoon not make any references to Vietnam, POWs, or Rambo's experiences in 1982's First Blood and 1985's Rambo: First Blood Part II, the show's head writer, Michael Chain, denies this and instead states that his previous experience in producing children's programming led him to make sure that Rambo would not "have an adverse effect on the psyche of children".

=== Parody ===
Crenna played Colonel Denton Walters, a parody of Trautman in the 1993 film Hot Shots! Part Deux, a parody of action movies, particularly the Rambo films. As in Rambo III, Crenna plays a mentor to the main character, and Crenna's character is captured and tortured by the enemy, requiring his rescue.

In the Russian TV series, Brigada, the character Sasha asks people who claim to have served in the military (as he had in Afghanistan), "who was your colonel?", in reference to Colonel Trautman.

=== Inspirations ===
The Trautman character and model resembles Colonel Roy Campbell in Hideo Kojima's 1998 PlayStation video game Metal Gear Solid, according to many fans of the series.

== See also ==
- Rambo (franchise)
- John Rambo
- List of Rambo characters
- Colonel James Braddock
