= Rambo: First Blood Part II (soundtrack) =

Rambo: First Blood Part II (Original Motion Picture Soundtrack)

Film score by Jerry Goldsmith
- Released: May 22, 1985 (original release); May 18, 1999 (re-issue); August 8, 2016 (expanded edition)
- Genre: Film score
- Length: 44:16 (original release); 60:21 (re-issue); 138:49 (expanded edition)
- Labels: Varèse Sarabande (original release); Silva Screen Records (re-issue); Intrada Records (expanded edition)
- Producers: David Paich; Jerry Goldsmith; Marty Paich; Bruce Botnick

Jerry Goldsmith chronology
| Baby: Secret of the Lost Legend (1985) | Rambo: First Blood Part II (1985) | Explorers (1985) |

Rambo: First Blood Part II (Original Motion Picture Soundtrack) Rambo: First Blood Part II is a 1985 war action film directed by George P. Cosmatos, which is the sequel to First Blood (1982) and the second instalment in the Rambo film series, with Sylvester Stallone reprising his role as Vietnam War veteran John Rambo. Jerry Goldsmith who composed for First Blood, returned for the sequel. Goldsmith reused the motif of "It's a Long Road" from the predecessor as the main title, while Stallone's brother Frank Stallone wrote and performed the song "Peace in Our Life". The album was first issued by Varèse Sarabande in 1985, and re-issued by Silva Screen Records, with the complete score released as an expanded edition through Intrada Records.

== Release history ==
The album was first distributed by Varèse Sarabande in conjunction with the film's release in CDs, LPs and cassettes. It accompanied 14 cues from Goldsmith's score with the original song "Peace in Our Life". Silva Screen Records re-issued the album on May 18, 1999, with six additional tracks. An expanded edition of the album was released on August 8, 2016, through the Intrada Records label in a two-disc format. The first disc accompanied the complete original score, while the second disc consisted of contents from 1985 original release, along with additional unused cues and music from the promotional materials.

== Critical reception ==
Christian Clemmensen of Filmtracks wrote "First Blood Part II is an outstanding action score held back only by its slow start and occasionally obnoxious electronics."

Stephen Thomas Erlewine of AllMusic described it "an enjoyable work that proves what a facile, agile composer Goldsmith can be." Jeremy Smith of /Film said, "Jerry Goldsmith's propulsive score gets the blood pumping something fierce." Samuel Williamson of Collider described it as "an exciting score by Jerry Goldsmith".

== Track listing ==
=== Varèse Sarabande original release (1985) ===
| No. | Title | Length |
|---|---|---|
| 1. | "Main Title" | 2:12 |
| 2. | "Preparations" | 1:16 |
| 3. | "The Jump" | 3:18 |
| 4. | "The Snake" | 1:48 |
| 5. | "Stories" | 3:26 |
| 6. | "The Cage" | 3:55 |
| 7. | "Betrayed" | 4:22 |
| 8. | "Escape from Torture" | 3:39 |
| 9. | "Ambush" | 2:45 |
| 10. | "Revenge" | 6:14 |
| 11. | "Bowed Down" | 1:04 |
| 12. | "Pilot Over" | 1:52 |
| 13. | "Home Flight" | 3:01 |
| 14. | "Day by Day" | 2:06 |
| 15. | "Peace in Our Life" (music by Frank Stallone, Peter Schless and Jerry Goldsmith; lyrics by Frank Stallone; performed by Frank Stallone) | 3:18 |
| Total length: | | 44:16 |

=== Silva Screen Records re-issue (1999) ===
| No. | Title | Length |
|---|---|---|
| 1. | "Main Title" | 2:14 |
| 2. | "The Map" | 1:09 |
| 3. | "Preparations" | 1:18 |
| 4. | "The Jump" | 3:19 |
| 5. | "The Snake" | 1:49 |
| 6. | "The Pirates" | 1:29 |
| 7. | "Stories" | 3:27 |
| 8. | "The Camp/Forced Entry" | 2:24 |
| 9. | "The Cage" | 3:57 |
| 10. | "River Crash/The Gunboat" | 3:37 |
| 11. | "Betrayed" | 4:24 |
| 12. | "Bring Him Up/The Eyes" | 2:06 |
| 13. | "Escape from Torture" | 3:41 |
| 14. | "Ambush" | 2:47 |
| 15. | "Revenge" | 6:16 |
| 16. | "Bowed Down" | 1:06 |
| 17. | "Pilot Over" | 1:54 |
| 18. | "Village Raid/Helicopter Flight" | 4:55 |
| 19. | "Home Flight" | 3:02 |
| 20. | "Day By Day" | 2:08 |
| 21. | "Peace in Our Life" (performed by Frank Stallone) | 3:19 |
| Total length: | | 60:21 |

=== Intrada Records expanded edition (2010) ===
Disc 1
| No. | Title | Length |
|---|---|---|
| 1. | "Carolco Logo" | 0:19 |
| 2. | "Main Title" | 2:16 |
| 3. | "The Map" | 0:59 |
| 4. | "Preparation" | 1:18 |
| 5. | "The Jump" | 3:12 |
| 6. | "The Snake" | 1:44 |
| 7. | "The Pirates" | 1:30 |
| 8. | "Stories / Percussion" (Overlay) | 3:28 |
| 9. | "The Camp" | 1:24 |
| 10. | "Forced Entry" | 1:02 |
| 11. | "The Cage" | 3:59 |
| 12. | "River Crash" | 2:22 |
| 13. | "The Gunboat" | 1:18 |
| 14. | "Betrayed" | 4:20 |
| 15. | "Bring Him Up" | 1:17 |
| 16. | "The Eyes" | 1:00 |
| 17. | "Escape from Torture" | 3:30 |
| 18. | "Ambush" | 2:40 |
| 19. | "Revenge" | 6:16 |
| 20. | "Bowed Down" | 1:06 |
| 21. | "Pilot Over" | 1:55 |
| 22. | "Village Attack / Helicopter Fight" | 4:54 |
| 23. | "Pre Lift-Off / Home Flight" | 3:25 |
| 24. | "Day by Day" | 2:06 |
| 25. | "Peace in Our Life" (performed by Frank Stallone) | 3:17 |
| Total length: | | 60:37 |

Disc 2
| No. | Title | Length |
|---|---|---|
| 1. | "Carolco Logo (With Slate)" | 0:34 |
| 2. | "Main Title" | 2:16 |
| 3. | "Preparation" | 1:18 |
| 4. | "The Jump" | 3:21 |
| 5. | "The Snake" | 1:54 |
| 6. | "The Pirates" | 1:30 |
| 7. | "Stories/Percussion" (Overlay) | 3:28 |
| 8. | "The Camp" | 1:24 |
| 9. | "Forced Entry" | 1:03 |
| 10. | "The Cage" | 3:59 |
| 11. | "River Crash" | 2:23 |
| 12. | "The Gunboat" | 1:17 |
| 13. | "Betrayed" | 4:26 |
| 14. | "Bring Him Up" | 1:17 |
| 15. | "The Eyes" | 1:00 |
| 16. | "Escape from Torture" | 3:43 |
| 17. | "Ambush" | 2:40 |
| 18. | "Revenge" | 6:18 |
| 19. | "Bowed Down" | 1:06 |
| 20. | "Pilot Over" | 1:57 |
| 21. | "Village Attack/Helicopter Fight" | 4:56 |
| 22. | "Pre Lift-Off" | 0:25 |
| 23. | "Day by Day" | 2:08 |
| 24. | "Stories" | 3:28 |
| 25. | "Percussion No. 1" | 0:07 |
| 26. | "Percussion No. 2" | 0:06 |
| 27. | "Ambush" (Early Take) | 2:48 |
| 28. | "Revenge" (Early Mix) | 6:43 |
| 29. | "Rambo Promo No. 1" (Original) | 1:05 |
| 30. | "Rambo Promo No. 2" (Revised) | 1:05 |
| 31. | "The Map" (Alternate) | 0:59 |
| 32. | "Helicopter Fight" (Alternate) | 4:17 |
| 33. | "End Credits" (Original) | 3:11 |
| Total length: | | 78:12 |

== Personnel ==
- Music composer and conductor: Jerry Goldsmith
- Music producer: Jerry Goldsmith, Bruce Botnick
- Recording: Mike Ross
- Mixing: Bruce Botnick
- Mastering: Joe Gastwirt
- Musical assistance: Lois Carruth
- Performer: National Philharmonic Orchestra

== Accolades ==
| Award | Category | Subject | Result |
|---|---|---|---|
| Razzie Award | Worst Original Song | Frank Stallone ("Peace in Our Life") | Won |
