= Rambo: First Blood Part II (Master System video game) =

1986 video game

- North American cover artwork featuring Sylvester Stallone as John Rambo
- Developer: Sega
- Publisher: Sega
- Composer: Katsuhiro Hayashi (林克洋)
- Series: Rambo franchise
- Platform: Master System
- Release: JP: November 16, 1986 (Ashura); NA: December 1986; PAL: October 1987 (Secret Command); Virtual Console: JP: June 3, 2008; PAL: April 17, 2009; NA: July 13, 2009 (Secret Command)
- Genre: Run and gun
- Mode: Up to two players simultaneously

Rambo: First Blood Part II (stylized on-screen as Rambo) is an overhead run and gun video game loosely based on the 1985 film of the same name that was published in North America by Sega for the Master System in 1986 and then re-released as a budget title in 1990. It was originally released in Japan as Ashura (阿修羅(アシュラ)), where it was released without the Rambo license.

Another version was released in Europe and Australia titled Secret Command (stylized on-screen as Secret Commando), which also lacked the Rambo license. A separate game based on the same film had previously been released on the 8-bit computers.

== Gameplay ==
Rambo is an overhead action shoot-'em-up in the vein of Commando and Ikari Warriors. The first player controls Rambo, who is armed with an M-60 machine gun with unlimited ammunition (which can only fire two shots on-screen) and a limited supply of explosive arrows used to take out tougher obstacles such as tanks and gates. A second player can play at the same time and control Rambo's partner Zane (a character created for the game), who wears a yellow headband. The objective of the game is to fight through the enemy's defenses, reach the gate at the end of each stage and then defeat as many enemy reinforcements as possible until the gate starts flashing in different colors. The player starts off the game with three lives and gains another one for completing each stage. A second player can join in anytime during the first stage as well until the second stage, in which the game will end for either player if one's lives run out.

Unlike the aforementioned games, the player can only shoot in five directions (left, up, right, or diagonally up-left or up-right), even though movement is allowed for all eight basic directions. When the player moves downward, the player character will have his weapon aimed upwards. However, enemies can shoot diagonally upwards. Power-ups are obtained by killing a specific number of enemy soldiers or as bonuses from the prisoners when they are freed from the huts located throughout the first four stages (which are only destroyable with arrows). Only one power-up can be on screen at a time, so if there is one dropped by an enemy at the time a prisoner should drop another, the prisoner will simply leave. These power-ups increase the range of shots, speed, the number of arrows and improve the firepower of the arrows hitting in four directions after the first explosion. There are also "?" marks, which can kill all enemies in the screen or add a life.

The player starts out each life with a supply of five explosive arrows, and gains two more with every item collected, no matter which item it is (although the in-game counter maxes out at "9", the player can actually carry more than that).

== Release ==
Rambo: First Blood Part II was originally released in Japan as Ashura. The Japanese version of the game had players controlling a pair of armed Buddhist monks named Ashura and Bishamon, who are on a mission to rescue their kidnapped friends from the enemy.

When the game was being localized for the American market, Sega bought the license to base the game on Rambo: First Blood Part II. The Player 1 character was redesigned to resemble Rambo, while Player 2 was replaced with a similar character who serves as Rambo's partner. The artwork on the title screen was replaced with a reproduction of Sylvester Stallone's pose from the film's theatrical poster, while the original title theme was replaced by a PSG rendition of Jerry Goldsmith's theme music from the movie. Some adjustments were also made to the game's difficulty (flamethrower soldiers for example, who could only be killed using arrows in Ashura, are now vulnerable to regular gunshots in Rambo). The visuals on the Stage Clear screen, which originally showed various Asian landscapes and buildings in Ashura, were replaced with images of Rambo in various action poses.

The game was modified again for its release in PAL territories, as the Rambo license was only usable for its North American release. As a result, the PAL version, Secret Command, combines elements from the previous two versions. The main characters are referred to as "Bishamon" and "Ashura" in the manual, but they still retain their designs from Rambo: First Blood Part II. The title music is also the same one from Ashura, but the artwork is different. The Stage Clear visuals are once again illustrations of Asian landscapes.

Both the Japanese (Ashura) and European (Secret Command) versions would later be released for the Wii Virtual Console, in their original release regions. Secret Command was also released for the North American VC service as well, as an "Import" title. Both versions also appear in some games in the Yakuza series that feature a playable Master System, beginning with Lost Judgment.
