= Rambo Department =

Coordinates: 13°14′25″N 1°49′34″W

Rambo
- Department
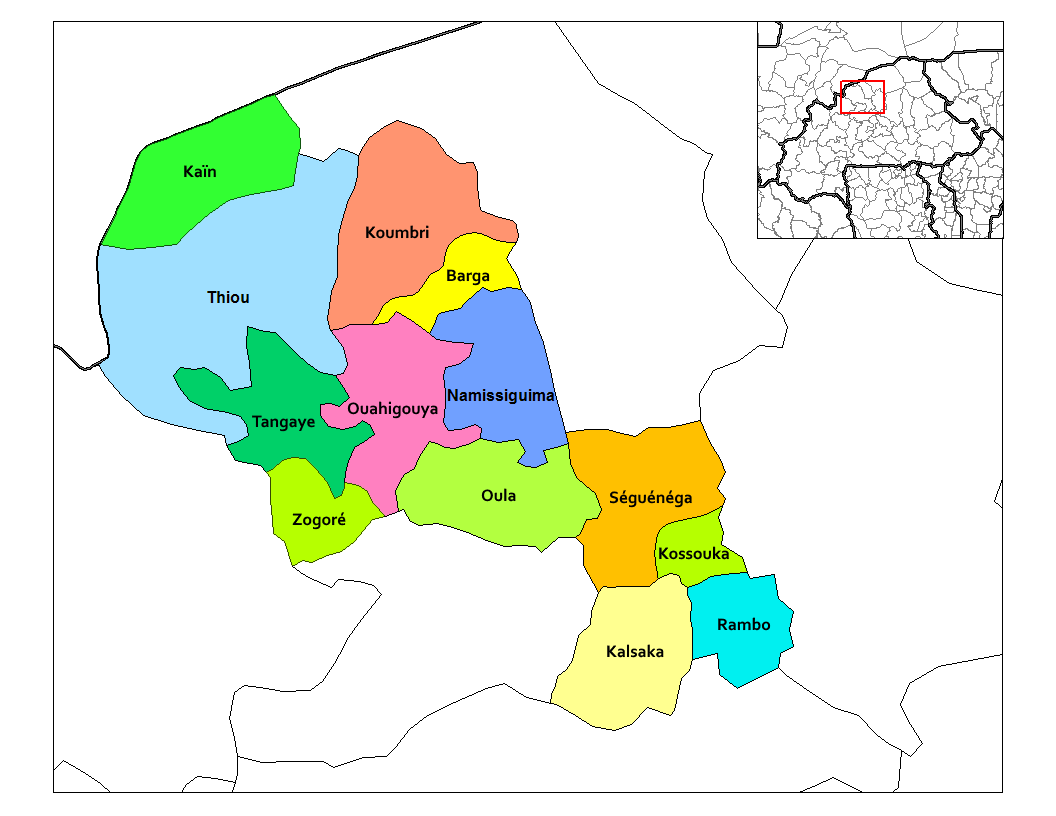
- Rambo Department location in the province
- Country: Burkina Faso
- Province: Yatenga Province

Area
  - Total: 108.6 sq mi (281.4 km^{2})

Population (2019 census)
  - Total: 46,957
- Time zone: UTC+0 (GMT 0)

Rambo is a department or commune of Yatenga Province in northern Burkina Faso. Its capital lies at the town of Rambo.
