= Rambo III (soundtrack) =

Rambo III: Original Motion Picture Soundtrack

Film score by Jerry Goldsmith
- Released: 1988 (original release); May 25, 1989 (complete score)
- Genre: Film score
- Length: 37:52 (original release); 76:02 (complete score)
- Labels: Scotti Bros. (original release); Intrada Records (complete score)
- Producer: Jerry Goldsmith

Jerry Goldsmith chronology
Rent-a-Cop (1987)	Rambo III (1988)	Criminal Law (1988)

Rambo III: Original Motion Picture Soundtrack Rambo III is a 1988 action film directed by Peter MacDonald which is a sequel Rambo: First Blood Part II (1985) and is the third installment in the Rambo series, with Sylvester Stallone reprising his lead role as Vietnam War veteran John Rambo. Jerry Goldsmith composed the film score, as he did for the previous installments. An album featuring selections of his score was released through Scotti Brothers Records while the complete score was published through Intrada Records, the following year.

== Release history ==
The original 1988 album was published by Scotti Brothers Records. It did not accompany much of Goldsmith's score, instead fewer cues were included while rest of the album had recycled his music from the previous installments. The complete 75-minute version of the score was published by Intrada Records, the following year on May 25, 1989. It was then remastered twice by Intrada: one in 2005 and the other in 2018.

== Critical reception ==
Christian Clemmensen of Filmtracks wrote "Rambo III is the type of high-quality action score that disappeared with the 1990's [...] The new themes introduced in this chapter stand well alongside the original themes, and make for a stirring and sometimes electrifying listening experience." Jonathan Broxton of Movie Music UK wrote "Fans of the Rambo franchise will find Rambo III to be the most subtle of the three scores Goldsmith penned for the series, but that doesn't mean there are no thrills or spills to be had, or that the action music is any less fulsome than in previous installments. It just means that there are many moments of reflection and beauty to be found here too, which is surprising considering how much of a reputation these films had for macho carnage and gung-ho Reaganite patriotism. No matter what assignment he was given, no matter how bombastic the action was, Jerry Goldsmith always found the heart of his story first, and was always able to bring out that inherent emotion in unexpected ways." Jason Ankeny of AllMusic wrote "With its emphasis on martial rhythms and volcanic eruptions of strings, brass, and synthesizers, Goldsmith's score exists largely to serve the over-the-top carnage onscreen, but it's the more subdued moments, though rare, that stick out—in particular, the opening cue, "Another Time," speaks more about the inner turmoil of the John Rambo character than Sylvester Stallone's brutish title performance ever will."

== Track listing ==
=== Original release ===
No.	Title	Artist(s)	Length
1.	"It Is Our Destiny"	Bill Medley	4:30
2.	"Preparations"		4:58
3.	"Afghanistan"		2:35
4.	"The Game"		2:23
5.	"Another Time"		3:54
6.	"He Ain't Heavy, He's My Brother"	Bill Medley	4:30
7.	"Aftermath"		2:42
8.	"Questions"		3:34
9.	"The Bridge"	Giorgio Moroder featuring Joe Pizullo	3:59
10.	"Final Battle"		4:47
Total length:			37:52

=== Complete score ===
No.	Title	Length
1.	"Another Time"	3:58
2.	"Preparations"	6:21
3.	"The Money"	0:52
4.	"I'm Used To It"	1:00
5.	"Peshawar"	1:12
6.	"Afghanistan"	2:38
7.	"Questions"	3:37
8.	"Then I'll Die"	3:34
9.	"The Game"	2:25
10.	"Flaming Village"	4:07
11.	"The Aftermath"	2:44
12.	"Night Entry"	3:58
13.	"Under and Over"	2:55
14.	"Night Fight"	6:50
15.	"First Aid"	2:46
16.	"The Long Climb"	3:25
17.	"Going Down"	1:52
18.	"The Cave"	3:31
19.	"The Boot"	1:53
20.	"You Did It, John"	1:08
21.	"The Showdown"	1:26
22.	"Final Battle"	4:50
23.	"I'll Stay"	9:00
Total length:		76:02

== Personnel ==
- Music composer, producer and conductor: Jerry Goldsmith
- Performer: Hungarian State Opera Orchestra
- Orchestration: Arthur Morton, Nancy Beach
- Recording and mixing: Mike Ross
- Mastering: Bernie Grundman

== Accolades ==
Award	Category	Recipient	Result
BMI Film & TV Awards	Film Music Award	Jerry Goldsmith	Won
