= Rambo (1985 video game) =

1985 video game

- Cover art with Sylvester Stallone as John Rambo
- Publisher: Ocean Software
- Platforms: Amstrad CPC, Commodore 64, ZX Spectrum
- Release: December 1985

Rambo (stylized on-screen as Rambo: First Blood Part II) is a 1985 video game based on the film Rambo: First Blood Part II (1985). The game was designed by David Collier and Tony Pomfret with the ZX Spectrum version converted by Platinum Productions.

The Commodore 64 version's music is by Martin Galway from Northern Ireland, incorporating melodies from the film's score. The Amstrad CPC version's music was played and recorded live by Choice Software's in-house programmer/designer/musician James Edward Cosby also from Northern Ireland, using a Yamaha DX7 synthesiser via the then new MIDI serial comms protocol.

Several other games based on the film were also released, including Rambo for the Nintendo Entertainment System, and Rambo: First Blood Part II for the Master System.

== Gameplay ==
Screenshot from the Commodore 64 version

The game follows the movie's story. The player, who is controlling Rambo, has to find his lost equipment, locate the POW camp, rescue the hostages, and make it back to the extraction point while being pursued by constantly respawning enemies. Rambo starts off with just a Bowie knife and grenades (both of which have an unlimited supply, as with all the weapons), and gains points for killing the enemy, and for collecting the following equipment: Rocket Launcher, M16 Rifle, and Bow & Arrows (Explosive & Non Explosive).

The gameplay is based on Capcom's arcade game Commando (1985).

== Reception and related releases ==
Reception

Review scores
Publication	Score
Crash	79%
Computer and Video Games	33/40
Sinclair User	3/5
Your Sinclair	8/10
ACE	4/5
Zzap!64	96%

Award
Publication	Award
Zzap!64	Gold Medal

Rambo was well received. Your Sinclair described it as "a thinking man's Commando. That game starts fast and gets faster until you end up like a one-man whirlwind. Rambo develops into a solid shoot'em up".

Rambo replaced Commando as the number one game in the Gallup ZX Spectrum chart and did the same on the Commodore 64 and All Formats charts the following week. The Amstrad CPC version also went to number one eight weeks later, replacing Yie Ar Kung Fu.

The Amstrad CPC and ZX Spectrum versions of the game were included on the 1986 compilation They Sold a Million 3, along with Fighter Pilot, Ghostbusters, and Kung-Fu Master.

In 1989, Ocean released the game alongside Daley Thompson's Decathlon and Enduro Racer as one of the launch titles for their new budget range, The Hit Squad. It reached number 4 in the All Formats Budget Games chart.
