= Icarus F99 Rambo =

F99 Rambo

General information
- Type: Ultralight aircraft
- National origin: Romania
- Manufacturer: Icarus Foundation
- Designer: Fendrihan
- Status: In production (2012)

The Icarus F99 Rambo is a Romanian ultralight aircraft, designed by Mr Fendrihan and produced by Romaero S.A of Bucharest under subcontract to the Icarus Foundation, also of Bucharest. The foundation is a sporting and cultural institution that promotes aviation in Romania. The aircraft is supplied as a kit for amateur construction or as a complete ready-to-fly-aircraft.

== Design and development ==
The aircraft was designed to comply with the Romanian microlight rules and also the Canadian AULA rules. It features a strut-braced high-wing, a two-seats-in-side-by-side configuration enclosed cockpit, fixed tricycle landing gear and a single engine in tractor configuration.

The aircraft is made from aluminum sheet. Its 9.10 m (29.9 ft) span wing has an area of 10.09 m^{2} (108.6 sq ft) and flaps. Standard engines available are the 80 hp (60 kW) Rotax 912UL and the 100 hp (75 kW) Rotax 912ULS four-stroke powerplants.

== Specifications (F99 Rambo) ==
Data from Icarus Foundation

General characteristics

- Crew: one
- Capacity: one passenger
- Length: 6.04 m (19.80 ft)
- Wingspan: 9.10 m (29.85 ft)
- Height: 2.44 m (8.00 ft)
- Wing area: 10.095 m^{2} (108.66 sq ft)
- Empty weight: 284 kg (627 lb)
- Gross weight: 469 kg (1,034 lb)
- Powerplant: 1 × Rotax 912ULS four cylinder, liquid and air-cooled, four stroke aircraft engine, 75 kW (101 hp)

Performance

- Maximum speed: 230 km/h (140 mph, 120 kn)
- Cruise speed: 200 km/h (124 mph, 108 kn)
- Stall speed: 63 km/h (39 mph, 34 kn)
- Range: 1,400 km (870 mi, 760 nmi)
- Service ceiling: 4,010 m (13,150 ft)
- g limits: +4/-2
- Rate of climb: 7.1 m/s (1,400 ft/min)

Avionics

- Airband radio
- GPS
- Intercom
