= Rambo (2008 film) =

American film by Sylvester Stallone

- Theatrical release poster
- Directed by: Sylvester Stallone
- Written by: Art Monterastelli; Sylvester Stallone
- Based on: John Rambo by David Morrell
- Produced by: Avi Lerner; Kevin King Templeton; John Thompson
- Starring: Sylvester Stallone; Julie Benz; Paul Schulze; Matthew Marsden; Graham McTavish; Rey Gallegos; Tim Kang; Jake La Botz; Maung Maung Khin; Ken Howard
- Cinematography: Glen MacPherson
- Edited by: Sean Albertson
- Music by: Brian Tyler
- Production companies: Millennium Films; Nu Image; Equity Pictures
- Distributed by: Lionsgate Films and The Weinstein Company (United States); Warner Bros. Pictures (Germany); Millennium Films (Overseas)
- Release dates: January 25, 2008 (United States); February 14, 2008 (Germany)
- Running time: 91 minutes
- Countries: United States; Germany
- Languages: English; Burmese; Thai
- Budget: $47.5–50 million
- Box office: $113.2 million

Rambo (Note: Also known as Rambo IV. The extended cut, and select international releases, are titled John Rambo.) is a 2008 war action film co-written and directed by Sylvester Stallone. A sequel to Rambo III (1988) and an American-German co-production, it is the fourth installment in the Rambo film series based on the character created by author David Morrell. Stallone stars as John Rambo, who leads a group of mercenaries into Burma to rescue Christian missionaries, who have been kidnapped by a local infantry unit. The film co-stars Julie Benz, Paul Schulze, Matthew Marsden, Graham McTavish, Rey Gallegos, Tim Kang, Jake La Botz, Maung Maung Khin, and Ken Howard. Rambo is dedicated to the memory of Richard Crenna, who had played Colonel Sam Trautman in the previous films and died in 2003.

The rights to the Rambo franchise were sold to Miramax Films in 1997 after Carolco Pictures went bankrupt. Miramax intended to produce a fourth film but Stallone was unmotivated to reprise the role. The rights were then sold to Nu Image and Millennium Films in 2005, who green-lit the film before the release of Rocky Balboa (2006). Filming began in Thailand, Mexico, and the United States in January 2007, and ended that May.

Rambo was theatrically released in the United States by Lionsgate and the Weinstein Company on January 25, 2008, and in Germany by Warner Bros. Pictures on February 14. It received mixed reviews from critics, with praise aimed at Stallone’s direction and performance, action sequences, and musical score, but criticism for its plot, excessively graphic violence, and political commentary. The film was a modest commercial success, grossing $113.2 million worldwide against a production budget between $47.5–50 million. The film was followed by Rambo: Last Blood, released in 2019.

== Plot ==
During the political protests of the Saffron Revolution in Burma, ruthless SPDC officer Major Pa Tee Tint leads his Burmese Army forces in a campaign of fear. His soldiers pillage settlements, sadistically slaughter innocents, abduct teenage boys to be drafted and hold women hostage to be raped as sex slaves.

Meanwhile, twenty years after leaving Afghanistan, (Note: As depicted in Rambo III (1988)) Vietnam War veteran John Rambo still lives in Thailand, making a living as a snake catcher and ferryman. He is approached by a group of missionary doctors from Colorado, led by Michael Burnett and his fiancée Sarah Miller, for a job to ferry them up the Salween River into Burma. They are on a humanitarian mission to provide medical aid to a village inhabited by the Karen people. Rambo initially refuses multiple times to take the group, but Sarah convinces him to help them.

On the way, the boat is stopped by pirates who demand Sarah in exchange for passage. Rambo quickly kills them, shocking the group. He drops them off at their destination and leaves; on his way back to Thailand, he destroys the pirates' boat while having flashbacks of the previous night's action. Shortly after the missionaries' arrival, Tint's forces raze the village and massacre the villagers, then capture Sarah, Michael and other survivors.

Back in Thailand, Rambo is hired to transport mercenaries on a mission to rescue the missionaries. Rambo takes them to the drop-off point and offers to help, but his offer is rejected by team leader Lewis, a former SAS soldier.

Myint, a Karen rebel familiar with the area, leads the mercenaries to the village. As they survey the damage, a squad of Tint's soldiers return. The soldiers sadistically force a group of prisoners to navigate a minefield for their entertainment. Rambo arrives and kills the Burmese soldiers with his compound bow. He joins the mercenaries, and they make their way to Tint's camp at night, where they have 15 minutes to rescue the surviving prisoners. They do this but the group is separated when they leave without Rambo, the mercenaries' sniper School Boy and Sarah to keep to their strict schedule.

The following day, Tint and his soldiers pursue the two groups. Rambo kills some of them by detonating an unexploded Tallboy bomb with a Claymore mine obtained from School Boy. Lewis steps on a landmine and has to be carried via stretcher back to the boat, where his group is captured. As the soldiers prepare to execute Lewis and his men, Rambo and School Boy arrive, Rambo takes charge of a M2 Browning-equipped technical and guns down the enemy soldiers aided by School Boy and his AMR. The mercenaries rearm themselves and re-engage their captors. The Karen rebels, led by Myint, join the fight, eventually overwhelming Tint's soldiers and their naval forces. One of the mercenaries, En-Joo, is killed in the fight. When his Tatmadaw forces are wiped out, Tint attempts to flee, but Rambo intercepts and disembowels him with his machete.

In the aftermath, Rambo, inspired by Sarah's words, returns to the United States to visit his father at his home in Bowie, Arizona.

== Cast ==
- Sylvester Stallone as John Rambo, a hardened Vietnam War Commando now residing in Thailand
- Julie Benz as Sarah, Michael's fiancée and a member of a missionary team
- Matthew Marsden as School Boy, the youngest soldier on Lewis's team who is a trained sniper
- Graham McTavish as Lewis, an ex-SAS soldier now leading a mercenary outfit
- Rey Gallegos as Diaz, a mercenary on Lewis's team
- Jake La Botz as Reese, a mercenary on Lewis's team with a knack for singing
- Paul Schulze as Michael Burnett, the leader of a missionary team heading into Burma
- Tim Kang as En-Joo, a mercenary on Lewis's team
- Maung Maung Khin as Tint, the murderous commanding officer of the SPDC in the Karen region

== Production ==
=== Development and writing ===
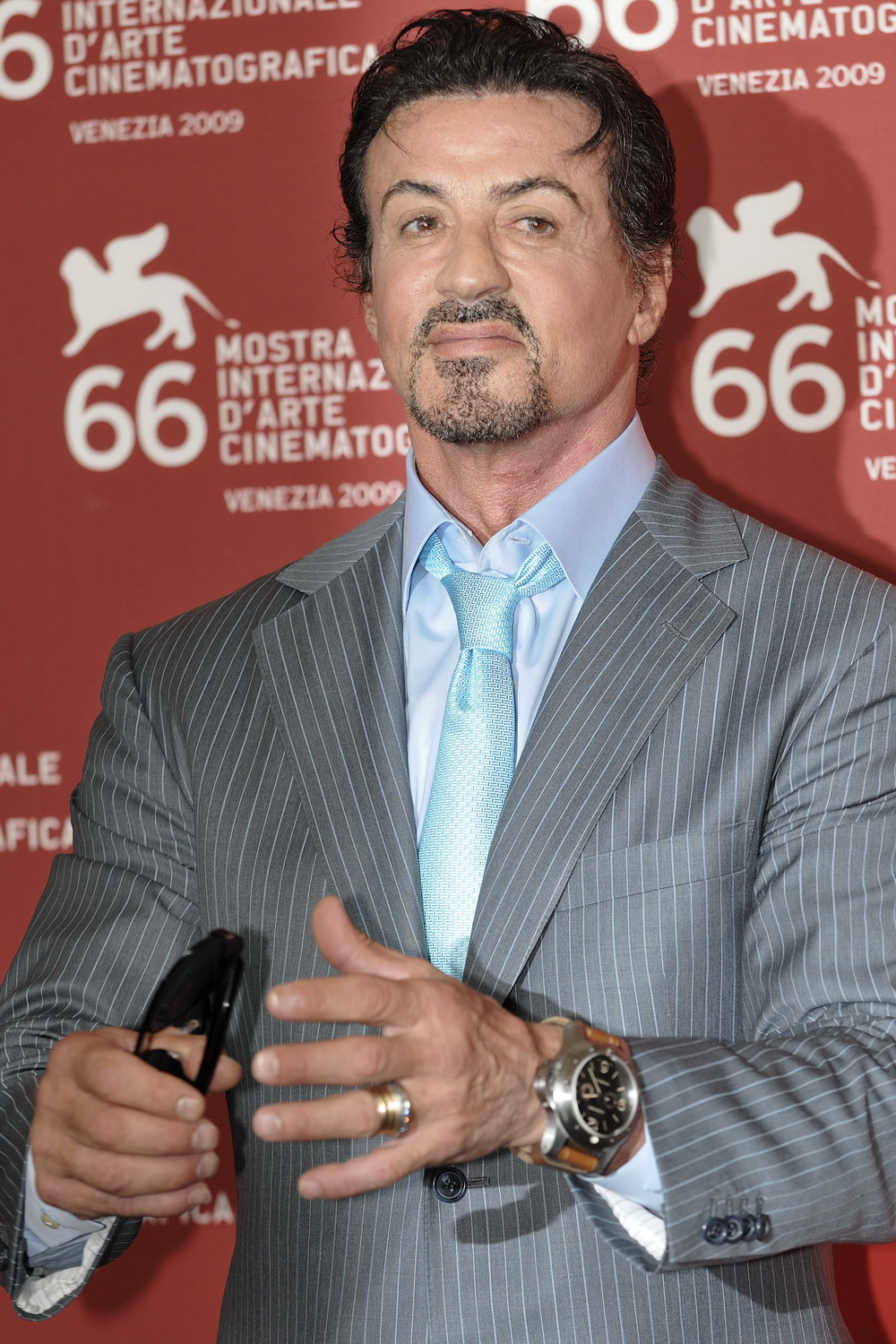
Sylvester Stallone in 2009

The film was an independent production between Nu Image and Emmett/Furla Films for Equity Pictures Medienfonds GmbH. It was green-lit and sold before Rocky Balboa was released. In between the making of Rambo III, the previous installment in the Rambo franchise, and this film, the films' original producer, Carolco Pictures, went out of business. In 1997, Miramax purchased the Rambo franchise. The following year, Miramax subsidiary Dimension Films intended to make another film, and a writer was hired to write the script, but attempts to make it were deterred by Sylvester Stallone, who had stated that he no longer wanted to make action movies. In 2005, the studio sold those rights to Millennium Films and Nu Image.

Stallone had stated that part of the reason that it took so long to produce a fourth film was due to a lack of a compelling story that motivated him to return to the role. An early idea was to have John Rambo travel to Mexico to rescue a kidnapped young girl. Stallone thought it was "good", however, he felt the idea lacked the "essence of Rambo", still wanting the character to be a "lost man wandering the world". The premise would later be used for Rambo: Last Blood (2019). Chuck Logan's novel Homefront was considered to be adapted as the fourth Rambo film, and was developed as much in the mid-2000s. The idea would have had Rambo return to the U.S. working as a DEA agent, having a daughter, and dealing with local meth dealers after moving to a small town in Louisiana. Stallone abandoned the Homefront draft because he felt it seemed premature to have Rambo return to America. Stallone would later revise the script as the 2013 film Homefront, which cast Jason Statham in the role of the DEA agent/father instead. Stallone got the idea to set the film in Burma from the United Nations, which he later pitched to producers.

The producers found the idea compelling after visiting Karen refugee camps. Maung Maung Khin, a former Karen freedom fighter, stated that if he accepted the role of the film's villain Major Pa Tee Tint, there was a chance some of his family would have been incarcerated in Burma, but accepted the role regardless, feeling that bringing awareness of the Saffron Revolution was important.

=== Pre-production ===
A different director was originally attached to direct the film but left due to creative disagreements. Stallone was reluctant to direct the film due to not being prepared nor having a vision for the film but later became excited when he came up with the idea of "what if the film was directed by Rambo? What if the film had his personality?" Graham McTavish later echoed this idea, stating, "In many ways, Rambo directed the movie." Paul Schulze stated that there were rewrites by Stallone nearly every morning. The film had a production crew of 560 people, including 450 Thai crew members, and over 80 foreign members from Australia, America, Canada, Myanmar and the United Kingdom.

=== Filming ===
Stallone stated that due to the small production budget the only way to make the film memorable was to make it graphically violent. He said "we were all sitting around in looking at the small production budget. Then I said 'Hey, fake blood is cheap, let's make it all-out bloody.'" Filming started on January 22, 2007, and ended on May 4, 2007. It was shot in Chiang Mai, Thailand as well as in Mexico and the United States in Arizona and California. While filming near Myanmar, Stallone and the rest of the crew narrowly avoided being shot by the Myanmar military. Stallone described Burma as a "hellhole". He said, "We had shots fired above our heads" and that he "witnessed survivors with legs cut off and all kinds of land-mine injuries, maggot-infested wounds and ears cut off."

=== Post-production ===
John Rambo was the original working title for the film but was changed in the US because Stallone thought that audiences might think that this is the final film in the Rambo series, due to the then recently released Rocky Balboa (2006), which was not his original intent. In many other countries, the title John Rambo is used because the first Rambo film First Blood was known as Rambo in those countries. The film premiered on US television as Rambo, but the title sequence referred to it as John Rambo.

On October 12, 2007, Lionsgate Films announced that the film title was being changed to Rambo: To Hell and Back. After some negative feedback from the online community, Stallone spoke with Harry Knowles and said:

Lionsgate jumped the gun on this. I just was thinking that the title John Rambo was derivative of Rocky Balboa and might give people the idea that this is the last Rambo film, and I don't necessarily feel that it will be. He's definitely a superb athlete, there's no reason he can't continue onto another adventure. Like John Wayne with The Searchers.

== Music ==
Brian Tyler composed the original score for the film. Stallone wanted Tyler to incorporate Jerry Goldsmith's original themes into the film. He did not rely on Goldsmith's actual theme, though he based his own theme and orchestrations on the style of the original to maintain the musical series. The soundtrack comprises 20 tracks.

== Release ==
=== Home media ===
The DVD and Blu-ray were released in the United States on May 27, 2008. The DVD was released in a single disc edition and 2-disc edition. The DVD was released in the UK on June 23, 2008. The film was the 19th best selling DVD of 2008 with 1.7m units sold and an overall gross of $41,811,370. In 2010, the film was included into the DVD and Blu-ray release of the Rambo: Complete Collector's Set.

The film was released on 4K Ultra HD on September 3, 2019, featuring the theatrical and extended cut. The film was given a second 4K Blu-ray release, part of the "Rambo Complete Collection", on May 26, 2026; this release exclusively featured Dolby Vision support for all the films.

In the United States and Canada, the DVD earned $40 million, and the Blu-ray earned $2.3 million, totaling $42.4 million in domestic video sales.

=== Extended Cut ===
During a panel at San Diego Comic-Con 2008, Cliff Stephenson announced that a "slightly different, slightly longer version of Rambo" will be released in 2009. It premiered at the 2008 Zurich Film Festival. The extended cut premiered on Spike TV on July 11, 2010, two weeks before its Blu-ray debut and to commemorate Stallone's then-latest film The Expendables. It was released on Blu-ray on July 27, 2010, and runs at 99 minutes.

It was marketed as Rambo: Extended Cut but the film itself replaces the theatrical title card with the original working title John Rambo. The extended cut restructures the film and restores most of the deleted scenes from the Blu-ray and 2-disc DVD of the theatrical cut. The Blu-ray features a 7.1 DTS-HD mix, and an 84-minute production diary titled Rambo: To Hell and Back.

== Reception ==
=== Box office ===
Rambo (2008) was a box-office success. It opened in 2,751 North American theaters on January 25, 2008, and grossed $6,490,000 on its opening day, and $18,200,000 over its opening weekend. It was the second highest-grossing movie for the weekend in the U.S. and Canada behind Meet the Spartans.

The film has a box office gross of $113,344,290, of which $42,754,105 was from Canada and the United States.

Europe's biggest cinema chain (and the third biggest in the world), Odeon, refused to show the film on any of its screens in the United Kingdom, due to a dispute with its British distributor Sony Pictures over rental terms for the film. The film was shown in Ireland and the United Kingdom by other theater chains such as Empire Cinemas, Vue, Cineworld and Ward Anderson. The film was not shown in the French-speaking part of Switzerland due to legal and commercial problems with the distributor, even if it was available on screens of France and the Swiss German-speaking part.

=== Critical response ===
Rambo received mixed reviews, with critics praising the film's action sequences and Stallone's performance, but criticizing the film's excessive violence, with it being labelled a "blood bath", "orgy of violence", "splatter film", and "violence porn." On Rotten Tomatoes, the film has an approval rating of 38% based on 150 reviews, with an average rating of 5.2/10. The site's critical consensus reads: "Sylvester Stallone knows how to stage action sequences, but the movie's uneven pacing and excessive violence (even for the franchise) is more nauseating than entertaining." On Metacritic, the film has a weighted average score of 46 out of 100, based on 26 critics, indicating "mixed or average reviews". Audiences polled by CinemaScore gave the film an average grade of "A−" on an A+ to F scale.

In his review for The New York Times, A.O. Scott wrote, "Mr. Stallone is smart enough—or maybe dumb enough, though I tend to think not—to present the mythic dimensions of the character without apology or irony. His face looks like a misshapen chunk of granite, and his acting is only slightly more expressive, but the man gets the job done. Welcome back." Michael H. Price of Fort Worth Business Press wrote, "Stallone invests the role with a realistic acceptance of the aging process, and with traces reminiscent of Humphrey Bogart in 1951's The African Queen and Clint Eastwood in 1992's Unforgiven—to say nothing of the influences that the original First Blood had absorbed from Marlon Brando in 1953's The Wild One and Tom Laughlin in 1971's Billy Jack."

When asked what his take on the film was, First Blood author David Morrell said:

I'm happy to report that overall I'm pleased. The level of violence might not be for everyone, but it has a serious intent. This is the first time that the tone of my novel First Blood has been used in any of the movies. It's spot-on in terms of how I imagined the character—angry, burned-out, and filled with self-disgust because Rambo hates what he is and yet knows it's the only thing he does well. ... I think some elements could have been done better, [but] I think this film deserves a solid three stars.

In 2022, Stallone singled out the movie as one of his best films:

One film I'm truly proud of—it's the best action film I've ever done because it's the most truthful—is Rambo IV, dealing with Burma, where they've had a civil war for 67 years. But I got excoriated because the movie's so violent. And it is violent. It's horrifying. It's children being burnt alive. That's what makes civil war worse than anything: It's your neighbor, all of a sudden, killing you. I was really happy with that film, and I never thought it would ever reach the theater. I thought, "They're never going to show this."

=== Reception in Burma ===
The film is banned by the Burmese government. Upon release, the then-ruling military junta ordered DVD vendors in Burma not to distribute the film due to the movie's content. Despite having never been released there theatrically or on DVD, bootleg versions of Rambo are available. The opposition youth group Generation Wave copied and distributed the film as anti-Tatmadaw propaganda.

The Karen National Liberation Army has said that the movie gave them a great boost of morale. Some rebels in Burma have even adopted dialogue from the movie (most notably "Live for nothing, or die for something") as rallying points and battle cries. "That, to me," said Stallone, "is one of the proudest moments I've ever had in film." Also, overseas Burmese have praised the movie for its vivid portrayal of the military's oppression of the Karen people.

== Sequel ==
In 2009, Stallone announced plans for a fifth film titled Rambo V: The Savage Hunt. The film would have been loosely based on Hunter by James Byron Huggins and would have focused on Rambo leading an elite special forces kill team to hunt and kill a genetically engineered creature. In 2011, Sean Hood was hired to write a new script, separate from Rambo V: The Savage Hunt, titled Rambo: Last Stand that Hood described was "more in line with the small-town thriller of First Blood". In 2012, Hood revealed that Rambo V was on hold while Stallone finishes The Expendables 2 (2012). Hood also revealed his uncertainty whether the film will be similar to Unforgiven or will be a passing-of-the-torch. In 2016, Sylvester Stallone revealed that Rambo V was no longer in production.

In May 2018, Rambo V was re-announced and was scheduled to begin filming in September with the plot focusing on Rambo taking on a Mexican drug cartel. Stallone was confirmed to be co-writing the script with Matt Cirulnick, but was unlikely to direct. That same month, Stallone confirmed that the film was scheduled for a fall 2019 release. In August 2018, Adrian Grunberg was announced as the director. Principal photography began in October 2018. Rambo: Last Blood was theatrically released in the United States on September 20, 2019.

== Bibliography ==
- Stephenson, Cliff; Albertson, Sean (2008). It's a Long Road: Resurrection of an Icon (Rambo - DVD/Blu-ray). Lionsgate Home Entertainment.
