= First Blood (novel) =

1972 novel by David Morrell

- First edition cover
- Author: David Morrell
- Original title: First Blood
- Language: English
- Genre: Action; Thriller
- Publisher: Rowman & Littlefield
- Publication date: 1972
- Publication place: United States
- Pages: 252
- ISBN: 0-214-66814-2

First Blood is a 1972 American action-thriller novel by David Morrell about a troubled homeless Vietnam War veteran, known only by his last name of Rambo, who wages a brutal one-man war against local and state police in Kentucky. It was adapted into the 1982 film First Blood starring Sylvester Stallone, which ended up spawning an entire media franchise around Rambo.

== Plot ==
A homeless Vietnam veteran known only by his last name, Rambo, wanders into Madison, a town in Basalt County, Kentucky, and is intercepted by local police chief Wilfred Teasle, who drives him to the town limits and orders him to stay out. When Rambo repeatedly returns, Teasle arrests him on charges of vagrancy and resisting arrest, getting permission to hold him for 35 days in jail. Kept inside a claustrophobia-inducing cell, Rambo experiences a flashback to his days as a POW in Vietnam and attacks the police as they attempt to cut his hair and shave him forcibly. Rambo escapes, killing an officer in the process, steals a motorcycle, and hides in the nearby mountains.

Teasle, not wanting the state police to capture Rambo before he does, gets a helicopter pilot to search the woods and organizes a posse consisting of himself, his officers, and Orval Kellerman, an experienced hunter with a pack of trained dogs. Meanwhile, Rambo stumbles across an illegal still and persuades the moonshiners operating it to provide him with clothes and food; he also talks them into giving him a lever-action rifle. The posse catches up with Rambo, who is cornered by the helicopter and fires on it in self-defense; the pilot panics and loses control, causing the chopper to crash and explode. When the posse arrives, Rambo shoots two of Kellerman's dogs; the frightened animals leap off a cliff, taking an officer with them, and Kellerman is fatally wounded while going to check on them.

Teasle's officers start firing wildly and waste most of their ammunition trying to kill Rambo; several desert their posts and try to return to town as a cloudburst stirs up. Rambo obtains a hunting knife, canteen, and pistol from the bodies of Kellerman and the deputy who fell off the cliff, then pursues Teasle's men, killing them one by one until only Teasle remains. However, Rambo is aware that Teasle is also a combat veteran and expects him to wait in ambush; his caution and the rain help Teasle escape. The state police rescue him and, once his condition is stabilized, get the National Guard to send detachments of troops to assist with the manhunt.

It is revealed to Teasle that Rambo was a member of an elite Green Beret unit in Vietnam; he has extensive experience in guerrilla warfare and survival tactics and received the Medal of Honor. Since his discharge from the Army, he has been unable to hold down a job, thus forcing him to live as a drifter. Teasle, bitter over the deaths of his men but also finding himself sympathetic to Rambo's plight, insists on helping capture him even though his health is beginning to deteriorate from his recent injuries. Rambo also finds himself torn between his instinct to keep fighting and his self-preservation; he refuses to take the opportunity to escape because the rush of battle is too much to resist.

Captain Sam Trautman, the director of the Green Beret program, helps reorganize the National Guard units to track Rambo, who is struggling with his own wounds and is starving. Two civilians hunting him alerted the National Guard to his presence before being killed. Rambo seals himself inside an abandoned mine and is bitten and scratched by a bat colony while looking for a way out. Teasle collapses, is taken back to town, and wakes up in his office after having a vision that reveals that Rambo is heading to Madison. Having stolen a police car and dynamite, Rambo starts blowing up most of the town, including the police headquarters, and sets fire to two gas stations.

Teasle surprises Rambo and shoots him in the chest, but is himself wounded in the stomach by a return shot. A dying Rambo flees town, and Teasle follows. As Trautman and the National Guard arrive, Rambo reaches a shed and prepares to commit suicide using his last stick of dynamite. Seeing Teasle walking towards him and deciding that it would be better to die fighting, Rambo fires at him to get his attention, but to his disappointment, Teasle is hit and falls over. Rambo feels disappointed that he is now too weak to light the fuse. Then, he gets shot in the head by Trautman. Rambo dies, satisfied that he has come to a fitting end. Teasle relaxes, experiences a moment of affection for Rambo, and then dies.

== Background ==
Morrell stated he was inspired to write the novel by hearing about the experiences of his students who had fought in Vietnam. Morrell said "When I started First Blood back in 1968, I was deeply influenced by Geoffrey Household's Rogue Male." He wanted to show the opposing forces in the country with someone who represented the establishment and someone who represented the disaffected. The latter character's name was derived in part from the Rambo apple, a supply of which his wife brought home while he was trying to come up with a suitable name for his character. One of the inspirations for Rambo was World War II veteran Audie Murphy, in particular his suffering from untreated PTSD in his post-war years. Madison, Kentucky was modeled after Bellefonte, Pennsylvania.

According to Morrell, "It took me three years to write the book because I was still learning how to write a novel, and because it took me a little while to figure out that the chapters would bounce back and forth between Rambo and the police chief." He was inspired by Ernest Hemingway's approach to action to try to write an action novel in a way that would not feel like a genre book.

== Reception ==
John Skow of Time described the book as "carnography", though he remarked that the technical aspects of it are done well.

The book has been translated into 30 languages.

== Film adaptation ==
The film rights to First Blood were first sold before the book was even released, with Stanley Kramer interested in directing, but the final contract was never signed. Cuban-Italian actor Tomas Milian read First Blood soon after its release and wanted to star in an adaptation of it; however, he was unsuccessful in persuading Italian producers to support the project. Still, he used "Rambo" as the name of his character, an ex-cop, in the 1975 film Syndicate Sadists.

In 1972, Morrell sold the film rights to First Blood to Columbia Pictures, who in turn sold them to Warner Bros. The film languished in development hell for ten years, with the story passing through three companies and eighteen screenplays. Finally, Andrew G. Vajna and Mario Kassar, two film distributors looking to become producers, obtained the film rights. Sylvester Stallone was cast in the lead role. Stallone used his clout to force changes to the script to make Rambo a more sympathetic character, including having Rambo not directly kill any police or national guardsmen (in the novel, he kills many), and having him survive at the end instead of dying as he does in the book. The film also differs from the novel in that, instead of Trautman being simply the commander of the school, he personally trained and led Rambo in Vietnam.

Veteran actor Kirk Douglas was originally cast as Colonel Trautman in First Blood and was set to receive top billing alongside Sylvester Stallone. However, Douglas withdrew from the production before filming began due to creative disagreements over the film’s ending. He strongly favored keeping the novel’s conclusion, in which Trautman kills John Rambo, believing it would provide a more dramatic and meaningful ending. The producers, however, refused to alter the script, leading to Douglas’s departure from the project.

Rambo, whose first name is not specified in the novel, was given the first name "John" for the film as a reference to the song "When Johnny Comes Marching Home".

The film was a major success, earning $125 million on a $15 million budget, and spawning an entire Rambo franchise.

David Morrell wrote the novelizations for Rambo: First Blood Part II and Rambo III.
