= John Rambo (disambiguation) =

John Rambo is a fictional character and the main protagonist of the Rambo franchise.

John Rambo may also refer to:

- John Rambo (athlete) (1943-2022), American athlete
- John Rambo (politician) (1661-1741), American politician
- Rambo (2008 film), extended cut and some international versions are titled John Rambo
- John Rambo (film) (2027)
- John Rambo (wrestler), American professional wrestler

== See also ==
- John "Rambo" Stevens (1957-2023), English music producer and manager
- Rambo (disambiguation)
