= Sisu (film) =

2022 film by Jalmari Helander

- Theatrical release poster
- Directed by: Jalmari Helander
- Written by: Jalmari Helander
- Produced by: Petri Jokiranta
- Starring: Jorma Tommila; Aksel Hennie; Jack Doolan; Mimosa Willamo; Onni Tommila
- Cinematography: Kjell Lagerroos
- Edited by: Juho Virolainen
- Music by: Juri Seppä; Tuomas Wäinölä
- Production companies: Stage 6 Films; Subzero Film Entertainment; Good Chaos
- Distributed by: Nordisk Film (Finland); Lionsgate (North America)
- Release dates: 9 September 2022 (TIFF); 27 January 2023 (Finland); 28 April 2023 (United States)
- Running time: 91 minutes
- Countries: Finland; United States
- Language: English
- Budget: €6 million (Note: $6.5 million)
- Box office: $14.3 million

Sisu is a 2022 action thriller film written and directed by Jalmari Helander and produced by Petri Jokiranta. The film stars Jorma Tommila, alongside Aksel Hennie, Jack Doolan, Mimosa Willamo and Onni Tommila. It is set during the Lapland War between Finland and Nazi Germany towards the end of World War II, where a legendary Finnish Army commando-turned-gold prospector attempts to defend himself from being robbed and murdered by a Waffen-SS platoon led by a brutal and corrupt officer.

Originally, Helander was supposed to work on the science fiction comedy Jerry and Ms. Universe as his next project after Big Game, but the COVID-19 pandemic changed Helander's plan and he moved on to make Sisu. An international co-production between Finland and the United States, the film was shot in 2021 near the Nuorgam village in Utsjoki, Lapland with a budget of about €6 million ($6.5 million). According to Helander, the 1982 film First Blood and the real-life Finnish military sniper Simo Häyhä, who fought against the Red Army, served as inspirations for the film. Sony Pictures Worldwide Acquisitions acquired the film's worldwide distribution rights outside of the Nordic countries and Lionsgate acquired North American distribution rights to the film from Stage 6 Films.

Sisu debuted in the Midnight Madness series at the Toronto International Film Festival on 9 September 2022. The film premiered in Finland on 27 January 2023. It was released in the United States on 28 April 2023 and received positive reviews from critics. A sequel, Sisu: Road to Revenge, was released on 21 November 2025 to similar positive response.

== Plot ==
In late 1944, during the Lapland War, Aatami Korpi searches for gold with his horse and dog in the wilderness of Lapland in the gold rush. He uncovers a rich deposit, collects a large quantity of gold nuggets, and travels towards Rovaniemi. Along the way, Aatami encounters a large Waffen-SS platoon led by Obersturmführer Bruno Helldorf. Helldorf is destroying villages during their retreat towards Norway and has taken several Finnish women captive. Helldorf takes little interest in Aatami, letting him pass. Aatami is soon accosted by a second unit of SS soldiers who discover his saddlebags full of gold. They jeeringly decide to rob and kill him, but he swiftly kills them all. Alerted by the gunfire, Helldorf investigates and discovers the massacre and one of Aatami's gold nuggets.

Helldorf and his tank pursue Aatami to the edge of a minefield, where Aatami's horse is killed by a landmine. Gathering up his gold while Helldorf and his men watch, Aatami intentionally detonates another mine to make his escape. Several soldiers are sent after him, but are quickly blown up by mines. Helldorf orders two of the captive women ahead to ensure a clear path. After retrieving Aatami's dog tag, Helldorf's second-in-command Wolf learns over the radio of Aatami's past. After losing his family while fighting as a Finnish Army commando during the Winter War, the vengeful Aatami became the legendary "one-man death squad" whom Joseph Stalin's Red Army nicknamed Koshchei ("the Immortal"). Helldorf defies his orders to continue retreating in order to hunt down Aatami and steal the gold, explaining to Wolf that Nazi Germany has already lost the war and they will need the gold to bribe their way out of being hanged.

The German soldiers dispatch dogs to follow Aatami's trail. Aatami sends his own dog away to safety before using petrol from one of the German trucks to cover his scent. However, the soldiers soon discover him and Aatami dives into a nearby lake. Helldorf sends three soldiers onto the lake in a boat, but Aatami kills two of them by slitting their throats underwater and breathes in the escaping air from their necks. The remaining German soldier attempts to flee, but is killed by Wolf for deserting. After reaching the riverbank, Aatami uses the soldier's body to shield himself from the Germans' gunfire and escapes. On the other side of the river, Aatami's dog is discovered by Helldorf.

Aatami discovers that Rovaniemi has been left in burning ruins and takes shelter in the remains of a petrol station. Helldorf sends Aatami's dog to find him, but with a lit Stielhandgranate attached to his collar. Aatami throws the grenade off to the side, saving his dog, but is knocked down and stunned when it explodes. Helldorf, Wolf, and tank driver Schütze hang Aatami, taking the gold and leaving him for dead, but Aatami impales one of his wounds onto protruding rebar, giving him the slack he needs to save his life, though he is still left hanging. Some time later, a German plane flies over the area in search of fuel, and the vibration from its flyover causes the structure Aatami is hanging from to collapse. The plane lands and the two pilots begin to search for fuel, but are ambushed by Aatami, who kills one of them, then forces the surviving pilot to fly him ahead of Helldorf's platoon.

Helldorf and the German convoy soon discover the abandoned plane in their path, and Wolf realizes that the pilot inside has been strangled to death using the same rope used to kill Aatami. Spooked, Helldorf quickly orders the convoy to keep going. As the Germans continue, Aatami climbs onto the truck holding the female captives, kills their guards, and arms the women. Aino, the de-facto leader of the women, commandeers one of the trucks, allowing Aatami to leap onto Helldorf's tank while the women gun down the rest of the soldiers. Aatami pulls Wolf out of the tank before leaving him at the mercy of the women. Helldorf reaches a commandeered Soviet plane and kills Schütze before taking off with the pilot. Aatami fires at the plane, mortally wounding the pilot, and uses his pickaxe to get onboard in midair. Helldorf and Aatami engage in hand-to-hand combat. After Helldorf gets the upper hand, Aatami swiftly hooks a static line to a bomb before releasing it, dropping Helldorf to his death. After finding that the pilot is dead, Aatami straps himself in as the plane crashes into a swamp.

Led by Aino, the freed women drive the commandeered German tank, with a beaten Wolf strapped to the turret, to an incredulous Finnish Army unit. Aatami crawls out of the swamp and reunites with his dog, before making his way to war-ravaged Helsinki. He enters a bank and empties his satchels of gold onto a teller's counter, then speaks for the first time with a request to exchange it for paper currency: "Bills. Big ones, please. Won't be so damn heavy to carry."

== Cast ==
- Jorma Tommila as Aatami Korpi
- Aksel Hennie as Bruno Helldorf
- Jack Doolan as Wolf
- Mimosa Willamo as Aino
- Onni Tommila as Schütze
- Tatu Sinisalo as SS Soldier 1
- Wilhelm Enckell as SS Soldier 3
- Arttu Kapulainen as Rower
- Ilkka Koivula as Fighter Pilot
- Max Ovaska as Engineer
- Pekka Huotari as Pilot
- Severi Saarinen as Troop Leader
- Vincent Willestrand as SS Soldier 4
- Aamu Milonoff as Bank Teller

== Reception ==
=== Box office ===
In the United States and Canada, Sisu was released alongside Big George Foreman and Are You There God? It's Me, Margaret., and was projected to gross around $4 million from 900 theaters in its opening weekend. It made $1.4 million on its first day, including $585,000 from Thursday night previews. It went on to debut to $3.3 million, finishing eighth. In total, Sisu grossed $7.3 million in the United States and Canada, and $7 million in other territories, for a worldwide total of $14.3 million. This made Sisu the most successful Finnish film at the United States box office, surpassing Aki Kaurismäki's The Man Without a Past (2002), which grossed about $922,000 in the U.S.

=== Critical response ===
On the review aggregator website Rotten Tomatoes, 94% of 181 critics' reviews are positive, with an average rating of 7.6/10. The website's consensus reads: "Narratively lean as it is deliriously gory, Sisu is an inspired pastiche that gives bloody satisfaction to action aficionados." Metacritic, which uses a weighted average, assigned the film a score of 70 out of 100, based on 25 critics, indicating "generally favorable" reviews. Audiences polled by PostTrak gave the film an 80% positive score, with 60% saying they would definitely recommend it.

Robert Daniels of RogerEbert.com gave the film three and a half out of four stars, stating that "Sisu is outlandishly entertaining, mostly because, contrary to its deeper themes, it isn't afraid to be nonsensical." Ross Bonaime of Collider gave the film grade of "B", saying that "Sisu is certainly ridiculous, but sometimes it's just fun to watch an obscene amount of Nazis get what's coming to them." Tom Shone of The Times gave the film four out of five stars, saying that it "is violent in the pulpy, maximalist manner of a Tarantino film — bones snap, bodies fly apart, blood leaps across the screen — but there is nothing messy about the storytelling, which is as tight as a Sergio Leone flick." Noyon Jyoti Parasara in his review wrote. "...never once does Sisu feel silly despite being such an improbable story. It is what we may call in India, "paisa vasool." For the non-desi, that's "bang for the buck"! Jason Bailey of The New York Times congratulated Helander for his commercial savvy to have concocted a lean, mean mixture of the most joy-buzzer elements of John Wick and Inglourious Basterds.

On 1 August 2023, Japanese video game designer Hideo Kojima, best known for the Metal Gear video game series, posted a message on Twitter in which he highly praised the Sisu film, saying: "This is no longer a war movie. It is a MAD grind of a battle between terribly cool men. A lot of fight ideas that surpass Rambo, the immortal old man!" At the end of the message, Kojima expresses his interest in making a game about the main character of the film.

=== Accolades ===
Award nominations for Sisu
Year	Award	Category	Nominee(s)	Result
2022	55th Sitges Film Festival	Best Film	Sisu	Won
2022	55th Sitges Film Festival	Best Actor	Jorma Tommila	Won
2022	55th Sitges Film Festival	Best Cinematography	Kjell Lagerroos	Won
2022	55th Sitges Film Festival	Best Music	Juri Seppä, Tuomas Wäinölä	Won
2024	51st Saturn Awards	Best International Film	Sisu	Won
2024	78th Jussi Awards	Best Film	Sisu	Nominated
2024	78th Jussi Awards	Best Director	Jalmari Helander	Nominated
2024	78th Jussi Awards	Audience Award for the Actor of the Year	Jorma Tommila	Nominated
2024	78th Jussi Awards	Best Cinematography	Kjell Lagerroos	Won
2024	78th Jussi Awards	Best Editing	Juho Virolainen	Won
2024	78th Jussi Awards	Best Set Design	Otso Linnalaakso	Won
2024	78th Jussi Awards	Best Costume Design	Anna Vilppunen	Nominated
2024	78th Jussi Awards	Best Make-up Design	Salla Yli-Luopa	Won
2024	78th Jussi Awards	Best Music	Juri Seppä, Tuomas Wäinölä	Nominated

== Sequels ==
In March 2023, Helander hinted in an interview with the news agency STT that if the film is successful at the box office in the United States, he would consider making a sequel. In May 2023, Helander said during an interview of GamesRadar+ that he might have an idea of how to continue the story of Aatami Korpi. Jorma Tommila has also expressed interest in returning for a sequel. In December 2023, Helander confirmed that he would return as director for the sequel, and the Finnish Film Foundation has initially granted a financial support of €50,000. Later, the amount of support increased to one million euros and the budget for the entire film was initially announced at around €11 million.

In March 2024, it was announced that filming of the sequel would begin in late summer and it was tentatively estimated that the film will premiere in less than two years. In April 2025, it was revealed that Sony Pictures' Screen Gems had replaced Lionsgate as the distributor to the sequel after its sister company Stage 6 Films opted to retain worldwide rights outside Finland, with the film scheduled for a theatrical release on 21 November 2025. At the same time, it was also announced that Stephen Lang and Richard Brake would be joining the cast of the film.

Helander has not directly stated whether he intends to direct a third Sisu film, because he considers Sisu: Road to Revenge a good conclusion to the story, although he does not completely rule out the possibility:

If someone ever says that you will get this much money if you make a third, then I may consider it.

== See also ==
- Cinema of Finland
- List of Finnish films of the 2020s
- List of action films of the 2020s
