= Jorma Tommila =

Finnish actor (born 1959)

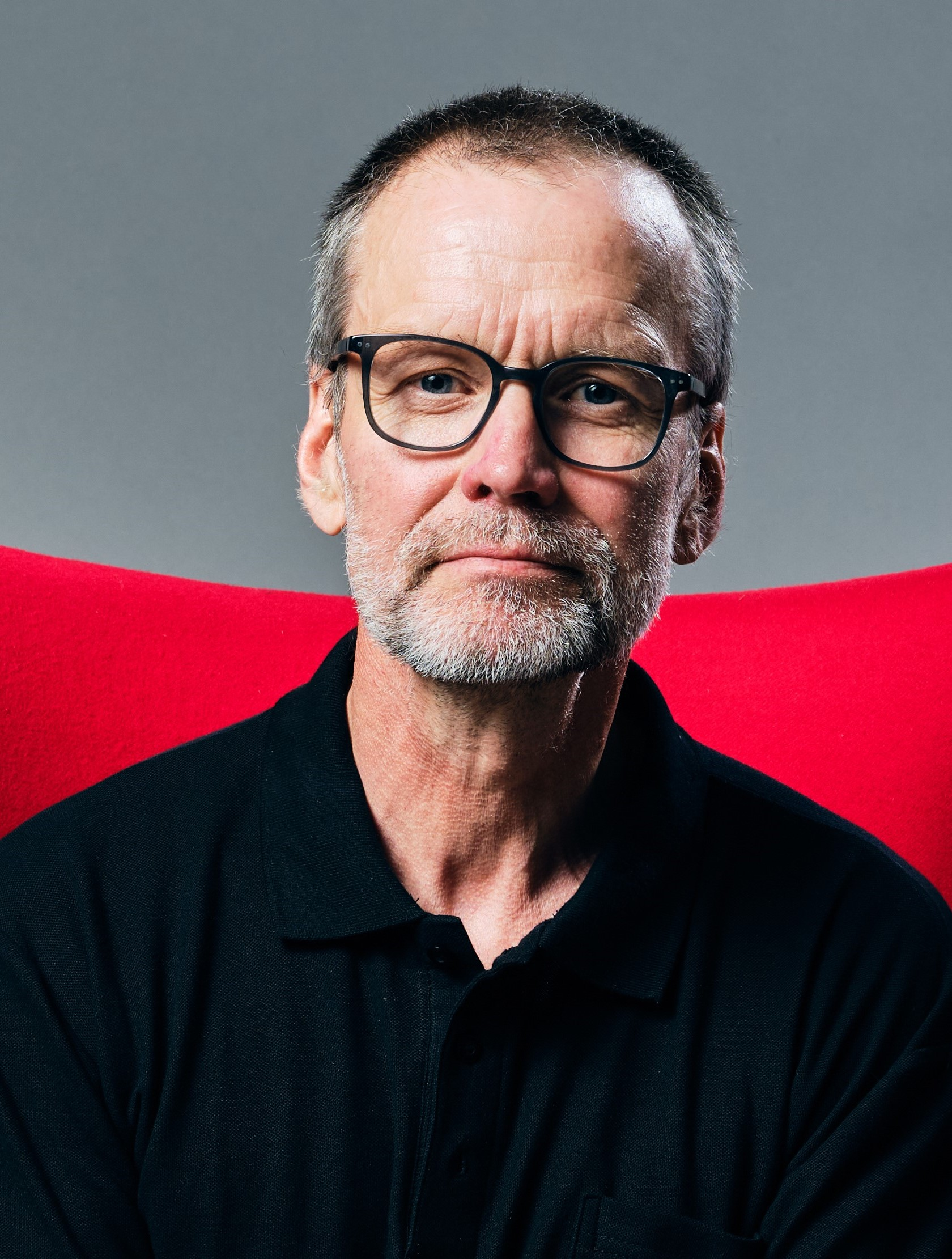
- Tommila in 2020
- Born: 1959 (age 66–67); Rauma, Finland
- Education: Helsinki Theatre Academy
- Occupation: Actor
- Years active: 1987–present
- Notable work: The Christmas Party (1996); Sisu (2022); Sisu: Road to Revenge (2025)
- Spouse: Ida Helander-Tommila
- Children: Onni Tommila
- Relatives: Jalmari Helander (brother-in-law)

Jorma Tommila (Finnish pronunciation: [ˈjo̞rmɑ ˈtomːilɑ]; born 1959) is a Finnish actor. He won the Jussi Award for Best Actor in 1997 and played Aatami Korpi in the films Sisu (2022) and Sisu: Road to Revenge (2025).

== Early and personal life ==
Tommila was born in Rauma, Finland and spent his youth in Kiukainen. His father died when Jorma was four years old, after suffering from injuries to his lungs in World War II. Tommila was raised by his mother, and his older sister Kielo Tommila is also an actress. He lives with his family in Vaasa. He is married to actress Ida Helander-Tommila, the sister of director Jalmari Helander. He is the father of Onni Tommila, who is also an actor.

== Career ==
Whilst at Helsinki Theatre Academy in 1987, Tommila was one of four founding members of Jumalan teatteri (God's Theater), a Finnish theater group that made experimental and radical stage art, their performances including full frontal nudity, the setting off of fire extinguishers, and the performers throwing faeces into the crowd. The four were arrested and fined, and given suspended prison sentences. They were also expelled from the academy, the expulsion prompting protests from fellow students.

In 1997, Tommila won the Jussi Award for Best Actor for his role in the film The Christmas Party, directed by his God Theatre's fellow founder Jari Halonen.

Tommila's character in the film Sisu, filmed in Lapland with a budget of €6 million, has been compared with Rambo (played by Sylvester Stallone) in the 1982 film, and with John Wick (played by Keanu Reeves). He has also been described as a “new action cinema icon”. Tommila portrays Aatami Korpi, an ex-commando and gold prospector who strikes gold but has his bounty stolen by Nazi soldiers. Korpi, with courage and "unimaginable determination in the face of overwhelming odds", becomes "a one-man death squad who will go to outrageous lengths to get his gold back – even if it means killing every last Nazi in his path." For the role Tommila won the award for best actor at the Sitges Film Festival in 2022.

Tommila is also known as a screenwriter; among other things, he has written the screenplay with Antti Jokinen for an upcoming film Kalevala: The Story of Kullervo, which is directed by Jokinen.

== Partial filmography ==
Key
†	Denotes works that have not yet been released

Year	Title	Role	Notes
1992	Back to the USSR – takaisin Ryssiin	Reima Elo	Also co-writer
1995	Lipton Cockton in the Shadows of Sodoma	Lipton Cockton	
1996	The Christmas Party	Bona Merenkylä	Also co-producer
2000	Bad Luck Love	Ali	
2003	Raid	French Foreign Legionary	
2004	Vares: Private Eye	Antero Kraft	
2007	The Year of the Wolf	Jarkko Salminen	
2009	The Visitor	Father	
2010	Rare Exports: A Christmas Tale	Rauno Kontio	
2014	Big Game	Tapio Kontio	
2022	Sisu	Aatami Korpi	
2025	Sisu: Road to Revenge	Aatami Korpi	
