= Sisu: Road to Revenge =

2025 film by Jalmari Helander

- Finnish theatrical release poster
- Directed by: Jalmari Helander
- Written by: Jalmari Helander
- Produced by: Petri Jokiranta; Mike Goodridge
- Starring: Jorma Tommila; Richard Brake; Stephen Lang
- Cinematography: Mika Orasmaa
- Edited by: Juho Virolainen
- Music by: Juri Seppä; Tuomas Wäinölä
- Production companies: Stage 6 Films; Screen Gems; Subzero Film Entertainment; Good Chaos
- Distributed by: SF Studios (Finland); Sony Pictures Releasing (Worldwide)
- Release dates: 21 September 2025 (Fantastic Fest); 22 October 2025 (Finland); 21 November 2025 (United States)
- Running time: 89 minutes
- Countries: Finland; United States
- Language: English
- Budget: $12.2 million
- Box office: $9.8 million

Sisu: Road to Revenge (Finnish: Sisu 2; stylized as SI2U) is a 2025 action film written and directed by Jalmari Helander. It is the sequel to Sisu (2022). Jorma Tommila reprises his role as Aatami Korpi. In the sequel, Korpi dismantles his old family house in now-Soviet Karelia, loads it on a truck, and transports it to rebuild somewhere safe in their honor. To avenge their losses to Korpi, the Soviet Union enlists Yeandor Draganov (Stephen Lang), a former Red Army officer who killed Korpi's family, to hunt him down. The film is produced by Petri Jokiranta and Mike Goodridge for Subzero Film Entertainment and Good Chaos respectively with Eric Charles' overseeing for Sony's Stage 6 Films. Unlike the previous film, which was set in Lapland, filming took place in Estonia.

Sisu: Road to Revenge premiered at the Fantastic Fest on September 21, 2025. It was released in Finland on October 22, by SF Studios, and in the United States on November 21, by Sony Pictures Releasing through Stage 6 Films and Screen Gems. Like its predecessor, the film has received a positive reception from critics despite its significantly weaker box office success.

== Plot ==
In 1946, Finland has ceded the territory of Karelia to the Soviet Union as part of the peace treaty in the aftermath of World War II. After his gold discovery in Lapland, Finnish ex-commando Aatami Korpi, "the man who refuses to die", crosses the border into Karelia where his family was brutally murdered during the war. He dismantles his house, loads it on a truck, and is determined to rebuild it somewhere safe in their honor. When the Soviet authorities learn of Aatami's arrival on their soil, KGB agents release Yeagor Draganov, the man who killed his family, from a prison in Siberia with the promise of a pardon and a rich reward if he avenges Aatami's mass slaughter of Red Army troops in the Winter War.

As Aatami travels west towards the Finnish border, Draganov intercepts him with a small squad of men. Aatami kills the soldiers, but spares Draganov, ignorant of his role in the deaths of his loved ones. Draganov then sends motorcycle troops and Ilyushin Il-2 'Bark' attack aircraft in pursuit. Aatami battles his way through the Soviet soldiers, but a bomber ultimately drives him and his truck off of a cliff into the ocean. Aatami recovers the remains of his home, converts the logs into a makeshift raft, and sails back to shore where he stumbles upon a derelict tank. He uses a pile of dynamite to catapult the tank over a Soviet border checkpoint and its Czech hedgehogs, but the tank is disabled and surrounded by Soviet troops. Aatami buries a knife blade in his wounded flesh before being captured by Draganov.

Draganov brings Aatami on a train bound for Siberia, has him tortured, and reveals his role in the murders of Aatami's family to him. Infuriated by the discovery of his family's killer, Aatami breaks free from captivity, retrieves his knife, and makes his way through the train towards the front, killing multiple Soviet soldiers. Draganov, meanwhile, murders his KGB handlers for a planned escape with the front of the train. Aatami finds a ballistic missile onboard the train, activates it, and uses it as a makeshift booster to catch up to Draganov. The two engage in a final fight; Draganov gets the upper hand, but Aatami detaches the still-active missile from the train and launches it into Draganov, killing him.

With his family avenged, Aatami recovers his home and uses the train car to transport it back across the Finnish border unimpeded. Back in Finland, as Aatami rebuilds his home, several Finnish men approach and offer their assistance, to Aatami's silent gratitude.

== Cast ==
- Jorma Tommila as Aatami Korpi, a former Finnish Army commando
- Stephen Lang as Yeagor Draganov, a Soviet Red Army officer responsible for killing Korpi's family
- Richard Brake as a KGB officer who sends Draganov to capture Korpi

The cast also includes Tommi Korpela as the leader of the Finnish men who help Aatami rebuild his home, Kaspar Velberg as a Russian fighter pilot, and Pääru Oja as a militsiya officer. Dog actor Simba portrays Ukko.

== Production ==
In an interview with the Finnish News Agency in March 2023, Helander expressed interest in a sequel to Sisu if the film proved successful at the American box office. In another interview in May 2023, Helander stated, "I have an idea of what would happen next...Maybe somebody needs [Aatami Korpi's] skills again but let's see." Helander has later said that the idea for the sequel's plot came about while he was renovating his apartment. In December 2023, Jorma Tommila also expressed interest in returning as protagonist Aatami Korpi for a sequel. That same month, Helander confirmed that he would return as director for the sequel, with the Finnish Film Foundation initially granting financial support of €50,000. Later, the amount of support increased to €1 million and the budget for the entire film was announced at around €11 million, making it one of the most expensive Finnish films.

In March 2024, it was announced that filming of the sequel would begin in late summer and it was estimated that the film would premiere in less than two years. The film was shot almost entirely in Estonia (which depicts Soviet-occupied Karelia in the film) while there was only one day of filming in Finland. Filming took place in both eastern and central Estonia in Rapla County and on the western coast of Estonia in Lääne County. The Baltic Klints, Estonia's limestone cliffs, were also among the filming locations.

According to Helander, the tone of the film drew on references to Indiana Jones, James Bond, and Buster Keaton's films. Tommila has stated that the role was physically demanding for his age, but he was able to endure it by applying the lessons he had learned from theatre director Jouko Turkka (1942–2016). In April 2025, it was revealed that Sony Pictures' Screen Gems had replaced Lionsgate as the domestic distributor to the sequel after its sister company Stage 6 Films opted to retain worldwide rights outside Finland, with Stephen Lang and Richard Brake joining the cast. The film is scheduled for a theatrical release in the United States on November 21, 2025. The film's Red Band Trailer was released on August 27, 2025.

== Release ==
A special screening was held in at Tennispalatsi in Helsinki, Finland, on October 21, 2025, the day before the official Finnish premiere, and among the invited guests was actor Stephen Lang with his wife Kristina Watson. In an interview given in connection with the screening, Lang said that he was very proud to be able to act in this film, and praised the Finns and their "sense of humor".

Sisu: Road to Revenge premiered in the United States on November 21, 2025, and it will be shown in approximately 2,100 locations.

In March 2026, Sisu: Road to Revenge became the third most-watched film on Netflix, behind Peaky Blinders: The Immortal Man and The Bad Guys 2.

=== Home media ===
The film was released digitally on December 16, 2025, and will be released on Blu-ray and DVD on February 17, 2026.

== Reception ==
=== Box office ===
In the United States, Sisu: Road to Revenge was released alongside Wicked: For Good. The film made $575,000 in Thursday night box office previews. Despite a significantly wider release than its predecessor, the film only grossed $2.6 million in its opening weekend, which is a 21.9% drop from its predecessor's $3.3 million opening. By Thanksgiving weekend, the film's box office was down 66%, averaging $365 per-screen. Given the film's budget of over $12 million, the film became a box-office bomb, grossing approximately $10 million worldwide.

=== Critical response ===
On the review aggregator website Rotten Tomatoes, 93% of 100 critics' reviews are positive, with an average rating of 7.4/10. The website's consensus reads: "Sisu: Road to Revenge consistently and creatively kills the competition." Metacritic, which uses a weighted average, assigned the film a score of 76 out of 100, based on 19 critics, indicating "generally favorable" reviews. Audiences polled by CinemaScore gave the film an average grade of "B" on an A+ to F scale, while those surveyed by PostTrak gave the film an average of 4.5 out of 5 stars.

Upon its release at Fantastic Fest, critic Rafael Motamayor praised the film in his review, comparing the film's fast-paced action to Mad Max: Fury Road and calling it the best sequel since John Wick: Chapter 4. Mike McCahill from The Guardian describes the film as "punchy, old-school stunt work and inventive baddie-splattering with a simple plot" and also adds that "like his protagonist, Helander holds on to the essential, torches the rest, and goes harder and faster for it." Brandon Yu from The New York Times describes the film as "blood-splattered inanity, which becomes a delirium of popcorn fun."

=== Accolades ===
Award nominations for Sisu
Year	Award	Category	Nominee(s)	Result
2026	53rd Saturn Awards	Best International Film	Sisu: Road to Revenge	Won
2026	80th Jussi Awards	Best Film	Sisu: Road to Revenge	Nominated
2026	80th Jussi Awards	Best Director	Jalmari Helander	Nominated
2026	80th Jussi Awards	Best Visual Effects	Jussi Lehtiniemi	Won
2026	80th Jussi Awards	Best Make-up Design	Salla Yli-Luopa	Won

== Future ==
Helander has not directly said whether he intends to direct a third Sisu film; after Road to Revenge, he began working on the John Rambo prequel film to the Rambo franchise, and has also considered Road to Revenge as a good conclusion to the story. However, Helander does not completely rule out the possibility of a sequel::

"If someone ever says that you will get this much money if you make a third, then I may consider it."

Tommila hinted that if he were invited to play Aatami Korpi in the third film, he would go along as long as he still had enough strength to do so.

== See also ==
- Cinema of Finland
- List of Finnish films of the 2020s
- List of action films of the 2020s
- List of most expensive Finnish films
