= Saturn Award for Best International Film =

Annual film award

- Awarded for: Best motion picture of the year in non-English language, or set or produced in a non-American country
- Country: United States
- Presented by: Academy of Science Fiction, Fantasy and Horror Films
- First award: 1979
- Currently held by: Sisu: Road to Revenge (2025/2026)
- Website: www.saturnawards.org

The Saturn Award for Best International Film is one of the annual awards given by the American professional organization, the Academy of Science Fiction, Fantasy and Horror Films. The Saturn Awards, which are the oldest film-specialized awards to reward science fiction, fantasy, and horror achievements (the Hugo Award for Best Dramatic Presentation, awarded by the World Science Fiction Society who reward science fiction and fantasy in various media, is the oldest award for science fiction and fantasy films), included the Best International Film category (then named Best Foreign Film) for the first time for the 1980 film year. It was deactivated after 1982, and was revived for the 2006 film year. It is given to a feature-length motion picture from outside the United States of America and/or films in foreign languages, including non-English American films.

== Winners and nominees ==
=== 1970s (Best Foreign Film) ===
Year	Motion picture	Country	Language
1979 (7th)	Dinner for Adele	Czechoslovakia	Czech
1979 (7th)	Circle of Iron	United States	English
1979 (7th)	Message from Space	Japan	Japanese
1979 (7th)	Nosferatu the Vampyre	West Germany; France	English, German, Romanian
1979 (7th)	Patrick	Australia	English
1979 (7th)	Starcrash	United States; Italy	English

=== 1980s ===
Year	Motion picture	Country	Language
1980 (8th)	Scanners	Canada	English
1980 (8th)	The Castle of Cagliostro	Japan	Japanese
1980 (8th)	The Changeling	Canada; United States	English
1980 (8th)	Harlequin	Australia	English
1980 (8th)	Terror Train	Canada; United States	English
1981 (9th)	Quest for Fire	France; Canada; United States	Invented language
1981 (9th)	Full Circle	Canada; United Kingdom	English
1981 (9th)	Roadgames	Australia	English
1981 (9th)	Time Bandits	United Kingdom	English
1981 (9th)	The Watcher in the Woods	United States; United Kingdom	English
1982 (10th)	Mad Max 2	Australia	English
1982 (10th)	The Chain Reaction	Australia	English
1982 (10th)	Class of 1984	Canada	English
1982 (10th)	The House Where Evil Dwells	United States; Japan	English
1982 (10th)	The Last Horror Film	United States	English

=== 2000s ===
Year	Motion picture	Country	Language
2006 (33rd)	Pan's Labyrinth	Mexico	Spanish
2006 (33rd)	Apocalypto	United States	Mayan
2006 (33rd)	Curse of the Golden Flower	China	Chinese
2006 (33rd)	Fearless	China	Chinese
2006 (33rd)	The Host	South Korea	Korean
2006 (33rd)	Letters from Iwo Jima	United States	Japanese
2007 (34th)	Eastern Promises	Canada; United Kingdom	English
2007 (34th)	Black Book	Netherlands	Dutch, German
2007 (34th)	Day Watch	Russia	Russian
2007 (34th)	Goya's Ghosts	Spain; United States	English
2007 (34th)	The Orphanage	Spain; Mexico	Spanish
2007 (34th)	Sleuth	United Kingdom	English
2008 (35th)	Let the Right One In	Sweden	Swedish
2008 (35th)	The Bank Job	United Kingdom	English
2008 (35th)	The Forbidden Kingdom	United States; China	English; Chinese
2008 (35th)	In Bruges	United Kingdom	English
2008 (35th)	Slumdog Millionaire	United Kingdom; India	Hindi; English
2008 (35th)	Transsiberian	United States	English
2009 (36th)	District 9	South Africa	English
2009 (36th)	The Imaginarium of Doctor Parnassus	United Kingdom; Canada; France	English
2009 (36th)	Lorna's Silence	Belgium	French
2009 (36th)	Red Cliff	China	Mandarin
2009 (36th)	Taken	France	English
2009 (36th)	Thirst	South Korea	Korean

=== 2010s ===
Year	Motion picture	Country	Language
2010 (37th)	Monsters	United Kingdom	English
2010 (37th)	Centurion	United Kingdom	English
2010 (37th)	The Complete Metropolis	Germany	German
2010 (37th)	The Girl with the Dragon Tattoo	Sweden	Swedish
2010 (37th)	Mother	South Korea	Korean
2010 (37th)	Rare Exports: A Christmas Tale	Finland	Finnish; English
2011 (38th)	The Skin I Live In	Spain	Spanish
2011 (38th)	Attack the Block	United Kingdom	English
2011 (38th)	Largo Winch	France; Belgium	French
2011 (38th)	Melancholia	Denmark; France	English
2011 (38th)	Point Blank	France	French
2011 (38th)	The Troll Hunter	Norway	Norwegian
2012 (39th)	Headhunters	Norway	Norwegian, Danish, Swedish, Russian, English
2012 (39th)	Anna Karenina	United Kingdom	English
2012 (39th)	Chicken with Plums	France; Germany; Belgium	French
2012 (39th)	The Fairy	Belgium; France	French
2012 (39th)	My Way	South Korea	Korean, Japanese, Russian, German, Chinese, English
2012 (39th)	Pusher	United Kingdom	English
2013 (40th)	Big Bad Wolves	Israel	Hebrew
2013 (40th)	Blancanieves	Spain	No dialogue (Intertitles in Spanish)
2013 (40th)	A Hijacking	Denmark	Danish
2013 (40th)	How I Live Now	United Kingdom	English
2013 (40th)	Stoker	United States; United Kingdom	English
2013 (40th)	The World's End	United Kingdom	English
2014 (41st)	The Theory of Everything	United Kingdom	English
2014 (41st)	Bird People	France	French, English
2014 (41st)	Calvary	(Republic of Ireland) Ireland; United Kingdom	English
2014 (41st)	Force Majeure	Sweden; France; Norway	Swedish, English, French, Norwegian
2014 (41st)	Mood Indigo	France; Belgium	French
2014 (41st)	The Railway Man	United Kingdom; Australia	English
2015 (42nd)	Turbo Kid	Canada; New Zealand	English
2015 (42nd)	Goodnight Mommy	Austria	German
2015 (42nd)	The Hundred-Year-Old Man Who Climbed Out of the Window and Disappeared	Sweden	Swedish
2015 (42nd)	Labyrinth of Lies	Germany	German
2015 (42nd)	Legend	United Kingdom	English
2015 (42nd)	The Wave	Norway	Norwegian
2016 (43rd)	The Handmaiden	South Korea	Korean
2016 (43rd)	Elle	France; Germany	French
2016 (43rd)	In Order of Disappearance	Norway	Norwegian
2016 (43rd)	The Mermaid	China; Hong Kong	Chinese
2016 (43rd)	Shin Godzilla	Japan	Japanese
2016 (43rd)	Under the Shadow	Qatar; Jordan; United Kingdom	Persian
2017 (44th)	Baahubali 2: The Conclusion	India	Telugu
2017 (44th)	Brimstone	Netherlands; France; Germany; Sweden; United Kingdom	English
2017 (44th)	The Lodgers	(Republic of Ireland) Ireland	English
2017 (44th)	The Man Who Invented Christmas	(Republic of Ireland) Ireland; Canada	English
2017 (44th)	The Square	Sweden; Germany; France; Denmark	Swedish, English, Danish
2017 (44th)	Wolf Warrior 2	China	Chinese, English
2018/2019 (45th)	Burning	South Korea	Korean
2018/2019 (45th)	Aniara	Sweden; Denmark	Swedish, Danish
2018/2019 (45th)	Border	Sweden	Swedish
2018/2019 (45th)	Ghost Stories	United Kingdom	English
2018/2019 (45th)	The Guilty	Denmark	Danish
2018/2019 (45th)	Shadow	China	Chinese
2019/2020 (46th)	Parasite	South Korea	Korean
2019/2020 (46th)	Jojo Rabbit	United States; New Zealand; Czech Republic	English
2019/2020 (46th)	The Nightingale	Australia	English, Irish, Palawa kani
2019/2020 (46th)	Official Secrets	United States; United Kingdom	English
2019/2020 (46th)	Sputnik	Russia	Russian
2019/2020 (46th)	The Whistlers	Romania; France; Germany	Romanian, English, El Silbo, Spanish

=== 2020s ===
Year	Motion picture	Country	Language
2021/2022 (50th)
2021/2022 (50th)	RRR	India	Telugu
2021/2022 (50th)	Downton Abbey: A New Era	United Kingdom	English
2021/2022 (50th)	Eiffel	France	French
2021/2022 (50th)	I'm Your Man	Germany	German
2021/2022 (50th)	Riders of Justice	Denmark	Danish
2021/2022 (50th)	Silent Night	United Kingdom	English
2022/2023 (51st)
2022/2023 (51st)	Sisu	Finland	Finnish, English
2022/2023 (51st)	Madeleine Collins	France	French
2022/2023 (51st)	Missing	Philippines	Ilocano, Tagalog
2022/2023 (51st)	The Origin of Evil	France; Canada	French
2022/2023 (51st)	Ransomed	South Korea	Korean
2022/2023 (51st)	Speak No Evil	Denmark	Danish, Dutch, English
2023/2024 (52nd)
2023/2024 (52nd)	Godzilla Minus One	Japan	Japanese
2023/2024 (52nd)	Animal Kingdom	France	French
2023/2024 (52nd)	Kill	India	Hindi
2023/2024 (52nd)	Monkey Man	Canada; India	English; Hindi
2023/2024 (52nd)	Oddity	(Republic of Ireland) Ireland	English
2023/2024 (52nd)	Society of the Snow	Spain	Spanish
2024/2025 (53rd)	Sisu: Road to Revenge	Finland	Finnish, English
2024/2025 (53rd)	40 Acres	Canada	English, Cree
2024/2025 (53rd)	Bring Her Back	Australia	English
2024/2025 (53rd)	Dead of Winter	Germany	English
2024/2025 (53rd)	Night Call	France	French
2024/2025 (53rd)	The Ugly Stepsister	Norway	Norwegian, Polish, Danish, Swedish

== Countries with most wins ==
- Canada: 4
- United Kingdom: 3
- South Korea: 3
- Finland: 2
- India: 2

== Countries with most nominations (6 or more) ==
- United Kingdom: 27
- France: 17
- United States: 15
- Canada: 10
- Germany: 9
- Sweden: 8
- Australia: 7
- South Korea: 7
- China: 6
- Denmark: 6
