= Mika Orasmaa =

Finnish cinematographer (born 1976)

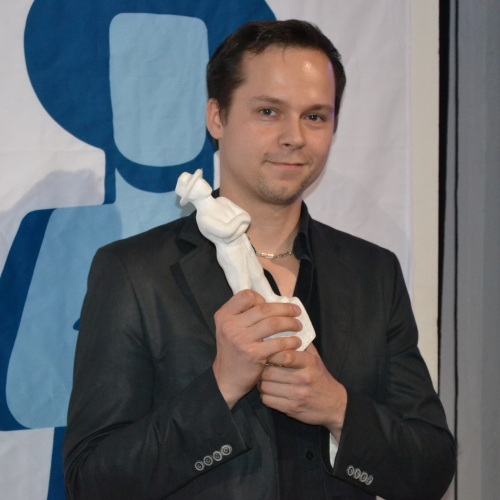
- Orasmaa at the 2011 Jussi Awards
- Born: 1976 (age 49–50); Valkeala, Finland
- Years active: 1996–present

Mika Orasmaa (born 1976) is a Finnish cinematographer. He has been awarded Jussi Awards for best cinematography for the films Christmas Story and Rare Exports: A Christmas Tale. Orasmaa has also worked as a cinematographer on several international productions, such as the British TV series World of Fire.

== Career ==
Orasmaa was born in Valkeala (now part of Kouvola). Orasmaa became interested in filmmaking in middle school after watching splatter films like Evil Dead II and action films like Commando and Predator, which inspired him to make homemade short films. Orasmaa ended up studying at the University of Art and Design Helsinki, where he directed one short film himself called Let's Fucking Die (1997). He also ended up collaborating with film director Jalmari Helander as a cinematographer on Helander's short films and later feature films.

== Partial filmography ==
=== Films ===
- Christmas Story (2007)
- Rare Exports: A Christmas Tale (2010)
- Iron Sky (2012)
- 8-Ball (2013)
- Big Game (2014)
- The Unknown Soldier (2017)
- Iron Sky: The Coming Race (2019)
- Attack on Finland (2021)
- There's Something in the Barn (2023)
- Sisu: Road to Revenge (2025)
- John Rambo (2027)

=== Television ===
- Nymphs (12 episodes; 2014)
- Bordertown (14 episodes; 2016–2019)
- World of Fire (2 episode; 2019)
- COBRA (3 episodes; 2020)
- Perfect Commando (10 episodes; 2020)
- Why Didn't They Ask Evans? (3 episodes, 2022)
- The Killing Kind (3 episodes; 2023)
- Doctor Who (3 episodes; 2023–2025)
