= John Rambo =

Character in Rambo film franchise

- Rambo character
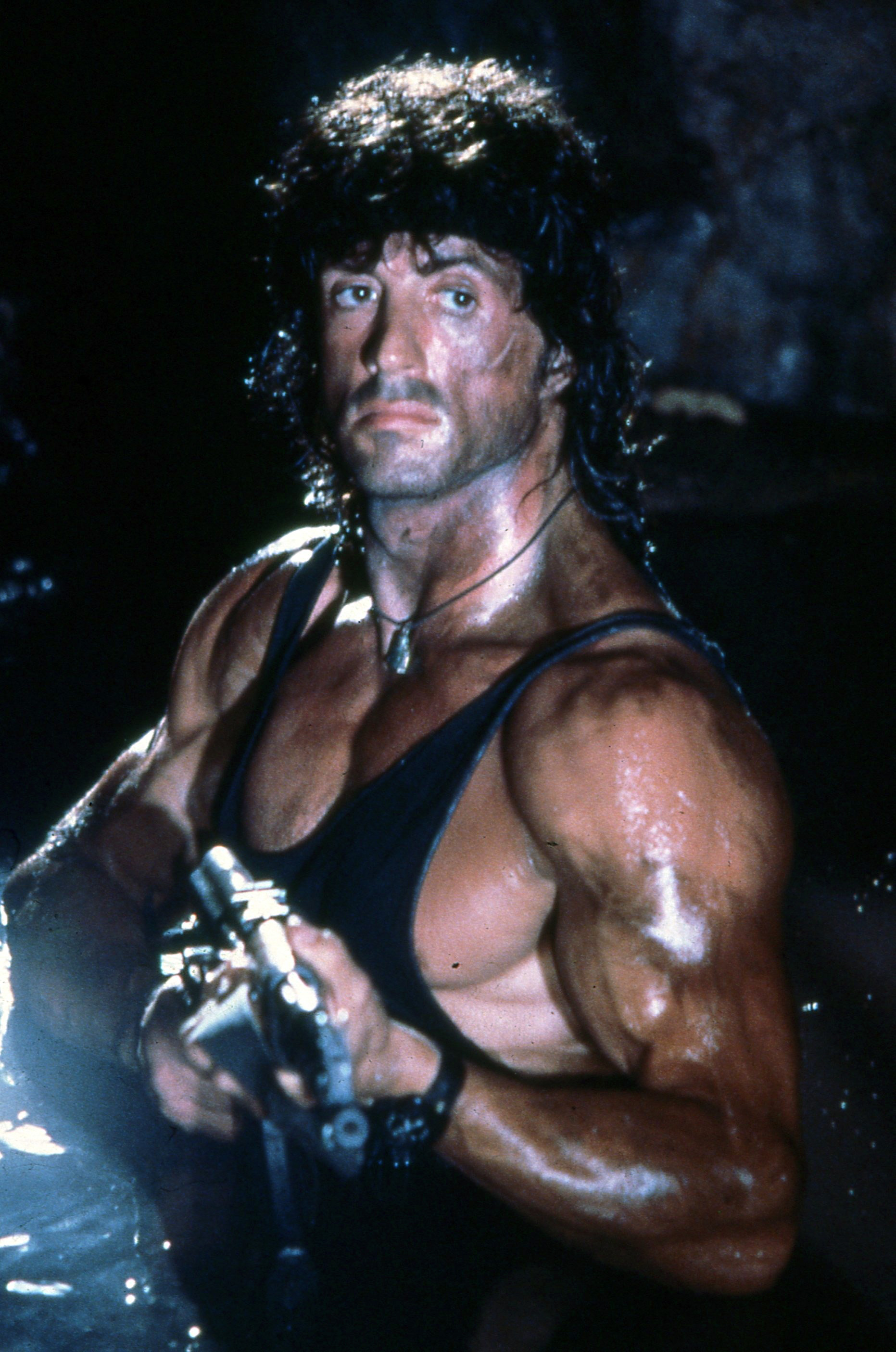
- Sylvester Stallone as John Rambo in Rambo III (1988)
- First appearance: First Blood (1972)
- Last appearance: John Rambo (2027)
- Created by: David Morrell
- Portrayed by: Sylvester Stallone (First Blood, Rambo: First Blood Part II, Rambo III, Rambo, Rambo: Last Blood); Noah Centineo (John Rambo)
- Voiced by: Neil Ross (Rambo: The Force of Freedom); Jim Foronda (Smite, Paladins: Champions of the Realm); Sylvester Stallone (Mortal Kombat 11)

In-universe information
- Full name: John James Rambo
- Aliases: Raven (field name); Lone Wolf (field name)
- Nicknames: Johnny (by Trautman); Boatman (by Lewis); Uncle John (by Gabriela); Juanito (by Hugo Martinez)
- Occupation: United States Army Special Forces MACV-SOG (former)
- Family: Reevis Rambo (father); Helga Rambo (mother); Gabriela Beltran (adoptive niece)
- Relatives: Colonel Sam Trautman (Mentor and father figure)
- Religion: Catholic/Buddhist
- Nationality: American
- Birthplace: Bowie, Arizona
- Accolades: Medal of Honor; Silver Star; Bronze Star
- Rank: Captain

John James Rambo is a fictional character in the Rambo franchise. He first appeared in the 1972 novel First Blood by David Morrell, but later became more famous as the protagonist of the film series, in which he was played by Sylvester Stallone. The portrayal of the character earned Stallone widespread acclaim and recognition. The character was nominated for American Film Institute's list 100 Years…100 Heroes and Villains. Following the success of the first movie, the term "Rambo" was occasionally used in media circles to describe a lone wolf who is reckless, uses violence to solve all problems, enters dangerous situations alone, and is exceptionally tough, callous, raw and aggressive.

== Creation and background ==
David Morrell says that in choosing the name Rambo, he was inspired by "the sound of force" in the name of Rambo apples, which he encountered in Pennsylvania. These apples, in turn, were named for Peter Gunnarsson Rambo, who sailed from Sweden to America in the 1640s, and soon the name would flourish in New Sweden. The name Rambo was likely derived from a shortened form of Ramberget (a hill on the Hisingen island in Gothenburg, where Peter Gunnarsson was born) plus "bo" (meaning "resident of"). Today, many of his descendants can still be found in this region of the US. Morrell also felt that its pronunciation was similar to the surname of Arthur Rimbaud, the title of whose most famous work, A Season in Hell, seemed to him "an apt metaphor for the prisoner-of-war experiences that I imagined Rambo suffering". Furthermore, an Arthur J. Rambo was an actual U.S. soldier in Vietnam, but he never returned. His name can be seen on the Vietnam War Memorial wall in Washington, D.C.. The first name "John" refers to the Civil War era song "When Johnny Comes Marching Home Again".

In the novel and first film, Rambo appears as a soldier who suffers from post-traumatic stress disorder and has difficulty adjusting to normal life. He is shown to be prone to violence because of the torture he suffered at the hands of North Vietnamese soldiers in the Vietnam War. In the next films and novelizations, he is displayed as a man who wants to stay away from conflict but is willing to do anything to save his friends and the people he cares about from any danger. Due to his violent nature, many civil people tend to fear him. However, Colonel Samuel Trautman (who was his commanding officer in Vietnam and is probably his only friend) understands him and the pain and torture he has endured in the war and is the only one able to reason with him when he becomes an outlaw after incapacitating police officers in the town of Hope.

Rambo has a muscular physique due to his time as a soldier in the army and his intense training regimen. He has a high amount of strength and stamina. Rambo is an expert in surviving in dense forests against a large number of enemies due to his experiences in the Vietnam War. He is also an expert in guerrilla tactics, weapons, and hand-to-hand combat. Rambo has black hair and brown eyes. His height is 5 ft 10 in (1.78 m). In the DVD commentary for First Blood, Morell remarks that the inspiration for Rambo was World War II hero Audie Murphy.

In all five films, Rambo is portrayed by Sylvester Stallone. In the animated TV series, the character is voiced by Neil Ross.

== Fictional biography ==
According to Rambo: Last Blood, the character's full name is John Rambo and he was born on July 6, 1947, in Bowie, Arizona, to father Reevis Rambo (1920–2000) and mother Helga Rambo (1924–1969), as shown on the graves at Rambo's farm in Rambo: Last Blood. In Rambo: First Blood Part II, he is said to be of Native American and German descent; the character Major Marshall Roger T. Murdock says: "Of Indian and German descent. That's a hell of a combination!" The film's novelization reveals he has an Italian father and a Navajo mother. John's niece, Shirlene, is also well known. Rambo enlisted in the U.S. Army at the age of 17, on August 6, 1964, although he states in Rambo that he was "drafted into Vietnam". After he graduated from Rangeford High School in 1965, his military service began in January 1966. Rambo was deployed to South Vietnam in September 1966. He returned to the U.S. in 1967 and began training with the U.S. Army Special Forces at Fort Bragg, North Carolina, under Colonel Samuel Trautman's tutelage.

In late 1969, Rambo was redeployed to Vietnam as a member of a SOG brigade. He became part of a Special Forces long-range reconnaissance patrol unit, commanded by Colonel Trautman. Trautman's team received the code name of Baker Team and usually consisted of eight men. Other known members were Delmar Barry (a black operative who quickly became Rambo's best friend), Joseph "Joey" Danforth (another friend of Rambo), Manuel "Loco" Ortega, Paul Messner, Delbert Krackhauer, Giuseppe "Greasy Cunt" Colletta, and Ralph Jorgenson. In an event that would haunt Rambo for the rest of his life, Danforth died in Rambo's arms, after being fatally wounded by a rigged shoeshine box while their unit was on rest and recuperation time.

During a mission in November 1971, Rambo's unit came under surprise attack by NVA forces. Delmar, Rambo, and some other surviving members were captured by North Vietnamese forces near the Chinese-Vietnamese border and held at a POW camp, where many other American POWs were imprisoned and repeatedly tortured. Rambo's unit was decimated during the ordeal, but Delmar and Rambo managed to escape captivity in May 1972, and Rambo was immediately redeployed at his own request. At some point in his military career, he also received training in flying helicopters. Rambo finally received his official military discharge on September 27, 1974.

Upon his return to the United States, Rambo discovered that many American civilians hated the soldiers returning from Vietnam, and he claimed that he and other returning soldiers were subjected to humiliation and embarrassment by anti-war "hippies" who threw garbage at them, called them "baby killers", and excluded them from society. His experiences in Vietnam and back home resulted in an extreme case of post-traumatic stress disorder. At the same time, inner questions of self-identity and reflectiveness had commenced to cause Rambo to lash out at society rather than handling difficult situations in a "civilized" manner. First Blood picks up from this point.

=== First Blood ===
==== Novel (1972) ====
In the novel First Blood, Rambo is hitchhiking in Madison, Kentucky. He is picked up by Police Chief Teasle and dropped off at the city limits. Repeatedly coming back, Rambo is arrested by Teasle and driven to the station. He is charged with vagrancy and resisting arrest, and is sentenced to 35 days in jail. Being trapped inside the cold, wet, small cells gives Rambo a flashback to his days as a POW in Vietnam, and he fights off the cops as they attempt to cut his hair and shave him, beating one man and slashing another with the straight razor, killing him. He flees, steals a motorcycle, and hides in the nearby mountains. He becomes the focus of a manhunt that results in the deaths of many police officers, civilians, and National Guardsmen.

In a climactic ending in the town where his conflict with Teasle began, Rambo is finally hunted down by Special Forces Colonel Sam Trautman and Teasle. Teasle, using his local knowledge, manages to surprise Rambo and shoots him in the chest, but is himself wounded in the abdomen by a return shot. He then tries to pursue Rambo as he makes a final attempt to escape back out of the town. Both men are essentially dying by this point, but are driven by pride and a desire to justify their actions. Rambo, having found a spot where he feels comfortable, prepares to commit suicide by detonating a stick of dynamite against his body; however, he then sees Teasle following his trail and decides that it would be more honourable to continue fighting and be killed by Teasle's return fire.

Rambo fires at Teasle and, to his surprise and disappointment, hits him. For a moment he reflects on how he had missed his chance of a decent death, because he is now too weak to light the dynamite, but then suddenly feels the explosion he had expected — but in the head, not the stomach where the dynamite was placed. Rambo dies satisfied that he has come to a fitting end. Trautman returns to the dying Teasle and tells him that he has killed Rambo with his shotgun. Moments after, Teasle dies, succumbing to his wounds.

==== Film (1982) ====
Sylvester Stallone as John Rambo from First Blood (1982) in December 1981 after returning to civilian life

The film First Blood takes place in December 1981, and begins with Rambo, now a homeless, unemployed drifter, searching for his old friend Delmar Barry. He goes to Barry's home, but is told by his mother that Barry died of cancer brought on by Agent Orange exposure. Rambo realizes that he is the last surviving member of his Special Forces unit (with unit members Barry, Westmore, Bronson, Danforth, and Ortega now all dead). He then travels to the small town of Hope, Washington (the movie was filmed in Hope, British Columbia, evidenced by the town sign), where he is quickly spotted by the town's arrogant and abusive sheriff, Will Teasle, due to his long, unkempt hair, army jacket and overall scruffy appearance. Teasle soon picks him up and drives him to the edge of town, refusing to let him have a meal (Rambo only wanted something to eat) while stressing his prejudged dislike of drifters and "trouble makers". Rambo, still hungry, begins defiantly walking back into town almost immediately after being dropped off, and Teasle, spotting him again, arrests him on the spot this time and takes him to the local police station.

When searching Rambo, Teasle discovers a large survival knife under Rambo's jacket. At the station, the Head Deputy Sheriff, Art Galt, beats Rambo and, along with others, harasses him. Rambo begins having flashbacks to his time in Vietnam when he was a tortured POW. When officers attempt to dry shave him, Rambo finally snaps and fights his way out of the station, beating up Galt, Teasle, and every deputy caught in his path while retrieving his knife. Outside, he hijacks a motorcycle from a man driving past the station and flees into the nearby mountains, while being pursued by Teasle in his police car. Teasle crashes his car, and Rambo escapes. Teasle calls in more officers and a helicopter, while Rambo abandons the motorcycle and makes his way into the deep terrain on foot. He finds an old sack near a dumped truck which he uses as an item of clothing. Later, he finds himself at the top of a cliff face whilst trying to escape the advancing policemen and is spotted by the search helicopter with Galt in the passenger's seat. Galt fires at him a number of times with his rifle, forcing Rambo to leap from the cliff, falling through a tree. Galt continues to fire upon the injured Rambo on the ground. Fighting back, Rambo throws a rock and hits the helicopter's windshield, causing the pilot to lose control and Galt to lose his balance and fall to his death. Rambo takes Galt's gun and radio, tends his own injuries, and eventually confronts the lawmen on the cliff above. Rambo shouts to them that Galt's death was an accident, but Teasle tells Rambo not to move or they will shoot. Rambo says he wants no more trouble, and begins to back away, but the men open fire; Rambo flees into the woods with Teasle and his deputies in pursuit.

The men catch up to Rambo and release tracking dogs. Rambo shoots two and their owner in the leg with his last bullets, and kills the other dog with his knife. The men begin to flank out and pursue Rambo, but Rambo easily disables them using guerrilla tactics. Rambo severely wounds each man, but does not kill any of them. Using a deputy as bait, Rambo jumps out of the brush and grabs Teasle, putting his knife to his throat. He threatens Teasle with further action if the police do not leave him alone. Teasle refuses to back down, and the State Police and National Guard are called in to assist in the hunt. Colonel Samuel Trautman soon arrives, taking credit for training Rambo. He is surprised to find any of the deputies still alive, and warns Teasle that it would be safer to let Rambo go and find him after the situation has calmed down. Still refusing to give in, Teasle asks Trautman to try and contact Rambo on his stolen radio to get a fix on his position. Trautman identifies himself and calls out the names of Rambo's Vietnam company, which gets Rambo to respond. Rambo declines to turn himself in and tells Trautman, "They drew first blood, not me". Rambo is eventually cornered by the National Guard in an abandoned mine entrance. Teasle gets word that Rambo is trapped, and gives an order not to fire. The inexperienced guardsmen ignore this, and fire a rocket at him. The blast collapses the mine entrance, sealing him inside. The men assume Rambo is dead, but unknown to his pursuers, Rambo has instead escaped into the mine tunnels.

Rambo eventually finds an old exit vent, near a main road from out of which the troops are clearing. Rambo hijacks a passing Army truck (forcing its driver to jump out onto the road in the process) and returns to town, crashing it into a gas station; he blocks the highway to anyone in pursuit by igniting the spilled fuel. Now heavily armed with an M60 machine gun, and intent on ambushing Teasle, Rambo destroys power transformers, knocking out the town's electricity. By this time, Teasle has received word of Rambo's escape from the cave and orders the town's population to remain indoors for safety. Rambo sets up diversions by randomly shooting targets in the town and blowing up a nearby gun store before spotting an armed Teasle on the roof of the police station. After severely damaging the building with heavy gunfire, Rambo enters, where he is spotted by Teasle through the skylight window who fires at him, but misses. Rambo shoots back at Teasle through the ceiling, critically injuring him. Teasle falls through the skylight onto the floor. Rambo steps over him, prepared to kill him. Before Rambo can shoot Teasle, Colonel Trautman appears and tells him that there is no hope of escaping alive. Now surrounded by the police, Rambo rages about the horrors of war, the hateful insults from antiwar protesters when he returned home, and his inability to hold down a steady job. Breaking down, he then weeps as he recounts witnessing the gruesome death of his friend Joey Danforth. He reveals to Trautman how they were in a bar, talking about his friend's Chevy and driving to Las Vegas in it, when a boy came in with a booby-trapped shoeshine box. Rambo had gone into the bar to buy beers when the box suddenly exploded, tearing his friend's lower body off. Rambo then turns himself in to Trautman, and, escorted by Trautman, is placed under arrest by the State Police.

There is an alternative ending where Rambo wants to die and tells Trautman to kill him. Trautman does not respond. Soon after, Rambo hands a gun to Trautman, who proceeds to pull the trigger and shoot Rambo in the stomach; Rambo subsequently dies of his wounds. Trautman then walks away, leaving Rambo's body in the station.

=== Rambo: First Blood Part II (1985) ===
After the incident in Washington, Rambo is found guilty after a jury trial and is sentenced to eight years at a labor camp prison. Three years later in 1985, he is visited in prison by Colonel Trautman, who offers him the chance of early release if he goes to Vietnam to search for American POWs at the camp that he escaped from back in 1971. Promised a presidential pardon if the mission succeeds, Rambo accepts and is temporarily reinstated in the U.S. Army. He later meets Marshall Murdock, an American bureaucrat who is in charge of the operation. He tells Rambo that he is only to photograph the POWs and not to rescue them nor engage any enemy soldiers; Rambo reluctantly agrees. He is then told that an agent of the U.S. government will be there to receive him in the jungles of Vietnam.

Rambo is parachuted into the Vietnamese jungles. However, while parachuting, he gets stuck on the plane and cuts the rope holding his equipment. This allows Rambo to continue parachuting, but it leaves him with only his knife, his bow, and arrows. On the ground, he meets Co Bao, a local woman working with the Americans. She takes him to a POW camp where he is able to rescue Banks, a captive, killing a number of enemy soldiers with his bow in the process of doing so. The trio then escape by boat but are attacked by a gunboat.

Rambo destroys the gunboat with a rocket launcher. When Rambo calls for extraction, he is denied, as Murdock fears what will happen to him and his party if the American public learn about Murdock's activities and that American servicemen were still being held prisoner. Rambo and Banks are both captured, and back at the camp Russian advisors soon arrive to interrogate Rambo. Meanwhile, Co enters the camp under the disguise of a prostitute and comes to the hut in which Rambo is held captive. There she witnesses Rambo being tortured by Russian Lieutenant Colonel Podovsky and his second in command Sergeant Yushin, who demands that the American contact his base and confess to war crimes. After being electrically shocked on a bedspring by Yushin and then burned on the cheek with his own knife, Rambo pretends to agree to Podovsky's condition, but instead tells Murdock on the radio that "he is coming to get him", after which he promptly escapes with Co's help. They hide in the jungle and Co tends to Rambo's wounds. She then asks him if he will take her with him to the U.S.; he agrees and kisses her, but they are attacked by some Vietnamese soldiers and Co is fatally shot by their commander, Tay. Enraged and distraught by Co's death, he kills them all (except for Tay, who escapes, but is later killed by one of Rambo's exploding arrows) and then buries Co's body in the jungle.

After the violence at the camp and on the river, Soviet and Vietnamese troops are scrambled to find and kill Rambo. While they are hunting for Rambo in a forest, he kills a number of them using guerrilla tactics. Vietnamese soldiers continue to chase Rambo into and through a village. In a patch of tall grass there, Rambo sets a booby trap explosion that ignites a fire, burning many of the Vietnamese soldiers.

While still running away from the soldiers, a Soviet captured UH-1 Huey helicopter finds Rambo and drops a keg of napalm onto his position. Rambo dives off a cliff into a river as the keg explodes. The helicopter pursues him, shooting bullets into the water. As the helicopter gets closer to the water while shooting bullets, Rambo jumps up from under the water, yanks the gunman from the helicopter, and climbs in to confront Yushin. As they fight inside the helicopter, it flies away and Rambo throws Yushin out of the helicopter to his death. As Rambo approaches the pilot, the pilot also jumps out of the helicopter. Gaining control of the helicopter, Rambo flies it back to the camp to rescue Banks and the remaining POWs. He kills the remaining guards and gets the captives into the chopper. Another Soviet attack helicopter, a Mi-24 Hind with Lieutenant Colonel Podovsky at the cockpit, then tails Rambo's chopper. After he loses Rambo's chopper in a haze of smoke from firing at it, he notices it smoldering in a river. As the Russian chopper flies in low to investigate and finish off the bird, Rambo – who had appeared to be dead – suddenly sits up, rocket launcher in hand, and fires through the windshield, finishing off Podovsky once and for all.

Rambo then returns to the base and, using the M60E3 machine gun from the helicopter, destroys Murdock's command center. He then unsheathes his knife and threatens Murdock, ordering him to find and rescue the remaining American POWs in Vietnam, warning, "You know there's more men out there. You know where they are. Find 'em... or I'll find you." Trautman comforts Rambo and tries to pacify him and to convince him to rejoin the Special Forces, also telling him he would get another Medal of Honor for his actions. Rambo, however, visibly angry and fighting back tears, says that the soldiers he rescued deserve the Medal more than he does, and he only wants the same thing as the soldiers he rescued: for their country to love its soldiers as much as its soldiers love their country. Rambo then starts to leave. Trautman asks him, "How will you live, John?"; Rambo replies, "Day by day". The film ends as Rambo walks off into the distance while his mentor watches him. Because of his actions in saving the POWs, Rambo is granted the Presidential pardon he had been promised and decides to stay in Thailand.

=== Rambo III (1988) ===
The third film opens with Colonel Trautman returning to Thailand to once again enlist the help of Rambo. After witnessing Rambo's victory in a stick fighting match, Trautman visits the construction site of the temple Rambo is helping to build and asks Rambo to join him on a mission to Afghanistan. The mission is meant to supply weapons, including FIM-92 Stinger missiles, to Afghan jihadists called the Mujahideen who are fighting the Soviets in the Soviet–Afghan War. Despite being shown photos of civilians suffering under Soviet military intervention, Rambo refuses, fearing a betrayal by the U.S. government similar to the last mission and wanting a life without more bloodshed; Trautman chooses to go on his own.

While in Afghanistan, Trautman's troops are ambushed by Soviet soldiers while passing through the mountains at night. Trautman is imprisoned in a Soviet base and interrogated by Colonel Zaysen and his henchman Kourov. Rambo learns of the incident from embassy field officer Robert Griggs and convinces Griggs to take him through an unofficial operation, despite Griggs' warning that the U.S. government will deny any knowledge of his actions if killed or caught. Rambo immediately flies to Pakistan where he meets up with Mousa, a weapons supplier who agrees to take him to a village deep in the Afghan desert, close to the Soviet base where Trautman is kept. The Mujahideen in the village are already hesitant to help Rambo in the first place, but are definitely convinced not to help when their village is attacked by Soviet helicopters after one of Mousa's shop assistants informs the Soviets of Rambo's presence. Aided only by Mousa and a young boy named Hamid, Rambo makes his way to the Soviet base and attempts to free Trautman. The first attempt is unsuccessful and results not only in Hamid getting shot in the leg, but also in Rambo himself getting splinters in the side. After escaping from the base, Rambo tends to Hamid's wounds and sends him and Mousa away to safety.

The next day, Rambo returns to the base once again, just in time to rescue Trautman from being tortured with a blow-torch. After rescuing several other prisoners, Rambo steals a helicopter and escapes from the base alongside Trautman. However, the helicopter soon crashes and Rambo and Trautman are forced to continue on foot. After a confrontation in a cave, where Rambo and Trautman eliminate several Spetsnaz commandos, including Kourov, they are confronted by an army of Soviet tanks, headed by Zaysen. Just as they are about to be overwhelmed by the might of the Red Army, the Mujahideen warriors, together with Mousa and Hamid, ride onto the battlefield by the hundreds in a cavalry charge, overwhelming the Communists. In the ensuing battle, in which both Trautman and Rambo are wounded, Rambo manages to kill Zaysen by driving a tank (somehow doing the work of a four-man crew all by himself, by also loading and firing the main gun) into the Russian's helicopter. Rambo survives the explosion and gets out of the tank. At the end of the battle Rambo and Trautman say goodbye to their Mujahideen friends and leave Afghanistan to go home.

=== Rambo (2008) ===
The fourth film opens with newsreels of the 2007 crisis in Burma. Burma is under the iron-fisted rule of Than Shwe and takes harsher stances against the nation's pro-democracy movement. Rebels are thrown into a mine-infested marsh and then gunned down by the Tatmadaw, while the Burmese military officer Major Pa Tee Tint, who ordered the genocides, watches the shootings grimly.

Meanwhile, Rambo is still living in Thailand. Residing in a village near the Burmese border, he makes a living capturing snakes and selling them in a nearby village. He also transports roamers in his boat. A missionary, Michael Burnett, asks Rambo to take him and his associates up the Salween River to Burma on a humanitarian mission to give aid to Karen tribespeople. Rambo refuses, having lost all faith in humanity at this point, but he is convinced by Sarah Miller to take them.

The boat is stopped by Burmese pirates, who demand Sarah in exchange for passage. After negotiations fail, Rambo kills them all. Although his actions save the missionaries, it greatly disturbs them. Upon arrival, Michael says that they will travel overland and will not need Rambo's help for the return trip, informing him that he intends to report him. The mission goes well until the Tatmadaw, led by Major Tint, attack. They kill most of the villagers and two missionaries and kidnap the rest, including Michael and Sarah. Ten days after the missionaries are scheduled to return, their pastor comes to ask Rambo's help in guiding hired mercenaries to the village where the missionaries were last seen. Rambo agrees then returns to his village and forges a new machete.

At their destination, Rambo tries to accompany the mercenaries, but their leader, described as a former "old school" and egotistical S.A.S. trooper, refuses. After arriving at the destroyed village with their guide, a Karen freedom fighter, they are forced to hide when some Tatmadaw arrive by truck and force their villager prisoners to run a gauntlet of hidden land mines thrown into the village rice paddies. The mercenary leader will not order a rescue, as he is concerned that the missing Tatmadaw will put the rest on alert. However, Rambo shows up with what is revealed to be his compound bow and shoots down the Tatmadaw. Rambo confronts the leader when the man threatens him, and with his arrow pointed at his eye, Rambo tells him and the others that soldiering is what they are and do, and gives them the option to "Live for nothing...or die for something". When Rambo stands down and tells the others to come, they follow without question with the leader in tow.

Rambo and the mercenaries locate and infiltrate a Tatmadaw base commanded by Major Tint. They plan to save the prisoners at a camp adjacent to the base. Rambo helps Sarah and the others to escape. The Tatmadaw unit finds the hostages missing and organizes a massive manhunt. Everyone is captured except for Rambo, Sarah, and the mercenary sniper "School Boy". But just as the group is to be executed, Rambo seizes a truck-mounted .50-caliber machine gun and massacres the Burmese army, giving an opening for School Boy to shoot down the Tatmadaw near the others and provide them also with weapons. Karen rebels join the fight to help Rambo and the mercenaries win. Major Tint attempts to get away, but Rambo disembowels him with his survival knife.

Encouraged by Sarah's words, Rambo leaves Thailand and returns to his home in the United States. He is seen walking along a Bowie, Arizona, highway until he sees a horse farm and a rusted mailbox. Reading the name "R. Rambo", Rambo smiles and walks down the house's gravel driveway.

=== Rambo: Last Blood (2019) ===
In this film Rambo: Last Blood, eleven years after the events in Burma, Vietnam War veteran John Rambo lives in Bowie, Arizona, in his deceased father's horse ranch, which he manages with his old friend, Maria Beltran, and her granddaughter, Gabrielle. Gabrielle reveals to Rambo that a friend of hers, Gizelle, has found Gabrielle's biological father, Manuel, in Mexico. Against Rambo and Maria's wishes, Gabrielle secretly drives to Mexico to ask why Manuel had abandoned Gabrielle and her mother years ago. Gizelle leads Gabrielle to Manuel's apartment, where he reveals to her that he never really cared for Gabrielle or her mother.

Gizelle takes a heartbroken Gabrielle to a local club, where Gabrielle is drugged and kidnapped by enforcers of a Mexican cartel. Meanwhile, Maria informs Rambo of Gabrielle's disappearance to Mexico. Rambo travels to Mexico and interrogates both Miguel and Gizelle about Gabrielle's whereabouts. Rambo is reluctantly led by Gizelle to the club where Gabrielle was last seen and confronts El Flaco, the man who last spoke with Gabrielle. A mysterious woman, Carmen Delgado, tails Rambo as El Flaco leads him to Gabrielle's location. Rambo is immediately confronted, beaten and marked by the cartel, led by brothers Hugo and Victor Martinez. They take his driver's license, revealing the ranch's location, and a photo of Gabrielle, whom Victor recognizes. The cartel vow to mistreat Gabrielle further due to Rambo's actions.

Carmen takes Rambo back to her home where she cares for him until he fully recovers. Carmen reveals herself to be an independent journalist who had been investigating the Martinez brothers, the kidnappers and murderers of her sister. Rambo later raids one of the brothels, killing several men until he finds a drugged Gabrielle. On the way back home, Rambo thanks Gabrielle for giving him hope for ten years before she dies from the forced overdose. Enraged, Rambo sends Maria away and rigs the ranch with traps for a confrontation, and later returns to Mexico to ask Carmen's help in finding Victor. Carmen initially refuses, believing that it will solve nothing, but is convinced after Rambo appeals to her grief and frustrations.

Rambo raids Victor's home, killing several guards and decapitating Victor. In retaliation, Hugo leads a group of hitmen to Rambo's ranch, where each falls victim to the rigged traps. Saving Hugo for last, Rambo mutilates him and rips his heart out as an act of revenge. In the aftermath, a weakened Rambo sits on the porch of his father's house, vowing to continue fighting and to keep the memories of his loved ones alive. After a montage of clips from all five Rambo films plays over the closing credits, Rambo saddles up his horse and rides off into the sunset.

=== John Rambo (2027) ===
A Bollywood remake of First Blood was scheduled as of 2019 to be released in October 2020, with Tiger Shroff, cast in the role of Rambo, expected to star in Hindi remakes of all five films in the Rambo franchise. However, the film was delayed due to the COVID-19 pandemic.

During the 2019 Cannes Film Festival, Stallone said he would continue portraying Rambo if the fifth film succeeded. Grunberg, however, said that Rambo: Last Blood "closes the circle", hoping it would conclude the film series. In September 2019, Stallone confirmed that he has plans for a prequel to the series; although he would not reprise the title role, he would like to explore who Rambo was before the war:

I always thought of Rambo when he was 16 or 17—I hope they can do the prequel—he was the best person you could find. He was the captain of the team; he was the most popular kid in school; super athlete. He was like Jim Thorpe, and the war is what changed him. If you saw him before, he was like the perfect guy.

Stallone has expressed interest in having Rambo take refuge in an Indian reservation for the sixth Rambo film. In June 2020, Stallone briefly elaborated on the idea, stating, "If I ever did another one, I think he would go back to the Indian reservation that he grew up on because he has Indian family. As of 2022, there will be no Rambo VI."

In May 2025, it was announced that Millennium Media was producing a prequel film to First Blood titled John Rambo. Jalmari Helander, known for the 2022 film Sisu, has been attached to direct the film, while Stallone is not expected to be involved with the film in any capacity. The director shared:

I have been the biggest fan of Rambo since the age of 11. It is so surreal to be in a situation where I can actually make my own Rambo movie. The chain of events that got me here makes, in a fantastic way, my whole childhood make sense. I can’t wait to bring the greatest action hero back to the big screen where he belongs.

In August 2025, actor Noah Centineo was cast as John Rambo.

== Awards and decorations ==

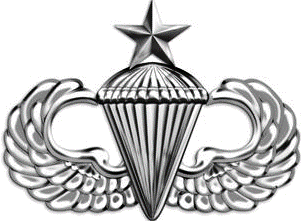

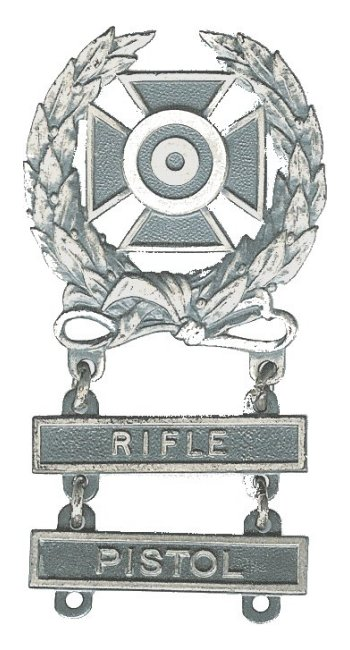

=== First Blood (1982) ===
In the original film, set in 1981, Rambo’s decorations are not on display, but his Medal of Honor, earned for valor during a daring escape from a Viet Cong prison camp, is central to his legend and referenced by Colonel Trautman.

=== Rambo: First Blood Part II (1985) ===
When Rambo returns to Vietnam to locate American POWs in 1985, his record is revealed on-screen: four Purple Hearts for combat wounds and the single Medal of Honor he earned in First Blood. He is later offered a second Medal of Honor but declines, insisting the prisoners he rescues deserve it more.

=== Rambo III (1988) ===
In deleted footage of Rambo’s Class A uniform, circa 1988, an extensive array of awards appears, including the Army Distinguished Service Medal; two Distinguished Flying Crosses; a Soldier’s Medal; an Air Medal; two Combat Action Ribbons; a Prisoner of War Medal; four Vietnam Service Medals; the Army Service Ribbon; the Vietnam Campaign and Vietnam Wound Medals (Republic of Vietnam); and badges for Combat Infantryman, Aircraft Crewman, Senior Parachutist, and Expert Marksmanship.

=== Rambo: Last Blood (2019) ===
In Rambo: Last Blood (2019), prior to joining the U.S. Army Special Forces, Rambo served two combat tours in Vietnam as a U.S. Air Force helicopter pilot, during which he was awarded the Medal of Honor. He reenlisted at Fort Bragg to qualify for Special Forces training. He is initially seen wearing the Air Force’s blue service uniform.

His home features a circa 1970 portrait of a 20-year-old Captain (O-3) Rambo wearing an Air Force service dress with U.S. lapel insignia, sporting the Medal of Honor, Purple Heart, Bronze Star Medal, Air Medal, National Defense Service Medal, Vietnam Service Medal, Aviator badge, Presidential Unit Citation, Outstanding Unit Award, Marksmanship Ribbon, and eight Air Medals.

== Appearances ==
=== Films ===
- First Blood (1982) – the first film in the series, directed by Ted Kotcheff
- Rambo: First Blood Part II (1985) – the sequel to the 1982 film, directed by George P. Cosmatos
- Rambo III (1988) – the sequel to the 1985 film, directed by Peter MacDonald
- Rambo (2008) – the sequel to the 1988 film, directed by Sylvester Stallone
- Rambo: Last Blood (2019) – the sequel to the 2008 film, directed by Adrian Grunberg
- John Rambo (2027) – the prequel to the 1982 film, directed by Jalmari Helander

=== Television ===
- Rambo: The Force of Freedom – Animated series based on Rambo franchise. Released in 1986

=== Novelizations ===
- First Blood – A novel written by David Morrell. Released in 1972
- Rambo: First Blood Part II – A novelization by David Morrell, based on Rambo: First Blood Part II. Released in 1985
- Rambo III – A novelization by David Morrell, based on Rambo III. Released in 1988

=== Comic books ===
- Rambo: Vietnam Hero, this was published in 1986 by Pocketkomix, a Vietnamese publisher.
- Rambo Adventures, a 1986 Italian comic book series based on the Rambo franchise
- Rambo III, a 1989 comic book adaptation of Rambo III
- Rambo, a 1989 comic book series published by Blackthorne Publishing based on the Rambo franchise
- First Kill, in November 2022 an Indiegogo campaign launched for a new graphic novel depicting Rambo's first tour of duty in Vietnam written by Sylvester Stallone and Chuck Dixon.

=== Video games ===
- Rambo – Based on Rambo: First Blood Part II. Released in 1985 for the ZX Spectrum, Amstrad CPC, and Commodore 64
- Rambo: First Blood Part II – Based on Rambo: First Blood Part II. Released in 1986 for Master System
- Rambo – Based on Rambo: First Blood Part II. Released in 1987 for the NES
- Rambo III – Based on Rambo III. Various games released in 1989 for Amiga, Amstrad CPC, Atari ST, Commodore 64, MS-DOS, MSX, ZX Spectrum, Mega Drive, Master System, arcade
- Rambo III – Based on Rambo III. Released in 1989 as an arcade video game
- Rambo – Based on Rambo: First Blood Part II and Rambo III. Released in 2008 for Sega 2-player light gun game
- Rambo: The Video Game – Based on First Blood, Rambo: First Blood Part II and Rambo III. Released in 2014 for Windows, Xbox 360, and PlayStation 3

=== Other appearances ===
Crossover DLC

Official Rambo Gameplay Trailer in Mortal Kombat 11

- Fight Klub, Rambo is a character in a trading card game published by Decipher, Inc.
- Mortal Kombat 11, a fighting game in which Rambo is a playable DLC character via downloadable content, with Sylvester Stallone reprising his role. In his arcade ending, Rambo defeated Kronika and planned to use her hourglass to right every wrong in history. As picking who lives and who dies for eternity would "kill his soul", Rambo walked away for good this time, intent on leaving the pain and the ugliness behind while stating "After all I've been through, I've earned a little peace".
- Call of Duty Warzone, Call of Duty: Black Ops Cold War and Call of Duty: Mobile featured the character as a time-limited DLC
- Three Hi-Rez Studios games, Smite, Paladins, and Rogue Company added the 2008 version of Rambo as a skin for the characters of Ullr, Viktor, and Seeker respectively.

Parody

- Family Guy: The Quest for Stuff, a freemium video game in which Rambo is an unlockable character.
- Broforce, a side-scrolling run-and-gun platform video game in which Rambro (A portmanteau of Rambo and bro.) is an unlockable character.
- Far Cry 6 features a mission where the playable character helps a Rambo super fan get revenge on the military.

== Cultural impact ==
John Rambo is considered a cultural icon. The character influenced many action heroes and films in the 1980s and 1990s. The John Rambo character became a prominent part of pop culture, with the term "Rambo" becoming a descriptor for individuals or situations. For example, in the legal profession a "Rambo lawyer" is one who habitually engages in "all manners of adversarial excess, including personal attacks on other lawyers, hostility, boorish and insulting behavior, rudeness and obstructionist conduct" or embraces "a 'take no prisoners' attitude". American Football player Mark Bavaro, who played professionally in the NFL from 1985 to 1995, was nicknamed Rambo during his career. Sitiveni Rabuka, the current prime minister of Fiji who led two coups against the Fijian government in 1987, is also nicknamed "Rambo."

== See also ==
- United States Army Special Forces in popular culture
