= Big Game (2014 film) =

Action-adventure film by Jalmari Helander

- Theatrical release poster
- Directed by: Jalmari Helander
- Written by: Jalmari Helander; Petri Jokiranta
- Produced by: Petri Jokiranta; Will Clarke; Andy Mayson; Jens Meurer
- Starring: Samuel L. Jackson; Onni Tommila; Ray Stevenson; Victor Garber; Mehmet Kurtulus; Ted Levine; Felicity Huffman; Jim Broadbent
- Cinematography: Mika Orasmaa
- Edited by: Iikka Hesse
- Music by: Juri Seppä; Miska Seppä
- Production companies: Subzero Film Entertainment; Altitude Film Entertainment; Egoli Tossell Film GmbH; VisionPlus Fund I; Film House Germany; Head Gear Films; Metrol Technology; Ketchup Entertainment; Waterstone; Bavaria Film Partners
- Distributed by: Nordisk Film Distribution (Finland); Entertainment One (United Kingdom); EuropaCorp (United States); Ascot Elite (Germany)
- Release dates: 5 September 2014 (TIFF); 19 March 2015 (Finland); 8 May 2015 (United Kingdom); 18 June 2015 (Germany); 26 June 2015 (North America)
- Running time: 90 minutes
- Countries: Finland; United States; United Kingdom; Germany
- Languages: English; Finnish
- Budget: €8.5 million ($10 million)
- Box office: $7.5 million

Big Game is a 2014 action-adventure film directed by Jalmari Helander and written by Helander and Petri Jokiranta. It stars Samuel L. Jackson, Onni Tommila, Ray Stevenson, Victor Garber, Mehmet Kurtulus, Ted Levine, Felicity Huffman, and Jim Broadbent. Finnish actors Jorma Tommila and Risto Salmi fill supporting roles. The film follows a 13-year-old boy named Oskari (Tommila) in his efforts to protect the President of the United States William Alan Moore (Jackson) from terrorists who shot down Air Force One.

Premiering at the 2014 Toronto International Film Festival, the film was generally well received critically, with IGN calling it "a throwback to '80s and '90s adventure movie with a dash of comic book violence thrown in for good measure."

== Plot ==
Air Force One is shot down by terrorists, leaving William Alan Moore, the President of the United States, stranded in the wilderness of Finland. In the forest on a hunting mission to prove his maturity to his kinsfolk, a 13-year-old boy named Oskari plans to track down a deer, only to discover an escape pod that holds Moore. The pair must team up to escape the terrorists, who are closing in to capture their own "Big Game" prize. Pentagon officials including the vice president, the Central Intelligence Agency (CIA) director, and a former CIA field operative Herbert, who has been brought in as a consultant, monitor the events through satellite broadcast.

Already feeling at a disadvantage as a hunter due to the reputation of his father, who had hunted and defeated a bear on his own hunt, Oskari's faith is further shattered when he follows a map his father left him, eventually finding a portable refrigeration unit with a pre-killed deer head in it. Moore boosts Oskari's confidence by reminding him of his goal. They are subsequently confronted by a corrupt United States Secret Service agent Morris, who orchestrated the attack from aboard Air Force One after sustaining a bullet wound that left a fragment of shrapnel near his heart, and a mercenary named Hazar. Although Hazar puts Moore into the refrigeration unit and takes him home to be killed, Oskari regains his confidence by leaping onto it before the helicopter can carry it away. Oskari drops the unit into a river.

Discovering that the river leads to the lake where Air Force One crashed, Moore and Oskari swim inside the plane to wait for rescue. Hazar attacks them, sets a time bomb, and receives orders to kill the President rather than torture him for later execution. Moore kills Hazar before he and Oskari escape Air Force One using the ejector seats. Oskari shoots Morris with an arrow as the former bodyguard leans out of a helicopter to kill them. The arrow fails to penetrate the protective padding on Morris's chest, but the impact still kills Morris by driving the shrapnel into his heart. As Morris plummets, Air Force One itself explodes, destroying his helicopter, and sending Moore and Oskari flying all the way back to the camp where a Navy SEAL team simultaneously arrives to search for Moore. For his actions as Oskari's "prize", Moore assures Oskari's father, Tapio, that his son is the bravest man he has ever met. Oskari receives the Medal of Honor for saving Moore's life.

During a private discussion in the bathroom at the Pentagon between the Vice President and Herbert, they learn that Hazar was originally a CIA operative. Their plan would have had the President killed to inspire a new war on terror, but with his survival, Moore becomes a hero instead, and the Vice President loses his attempt to become President. To ensure nothing can be traced back to them, Herbert kills the Vice President.

== Cast ==
- Samuel L. Jackson as William Alan Moore, President of the United States
- Onni Tommila as Oskari Kontoi
- Ray Stevenson as Morris
- Victor Garber as Vice President of the United States
- Mehmet Kurtuluş as Hazar, a former CIA operative posing as a freelance terrorist
- Ted Levine as General Underwood
- Felicity Huffman as Director of the Central Intelligence Agency
- Jim Broadbent as Fred Herbert, a former CIA operative, advisor, and head of the Terrorist Intel Unit
- Jorma Tommila as Tapio Kontoi, Oskari Kontoi's father
- Risto Salmi as Hamara
- Rauno Juvonen as Safari Pilot
- Moe Abbas as Arab Pilot
- Philipp Rafferty as Air Force One Pilot
- Jörg Witte as Farmer

== Production ==
The film's budget was €8.5 million (equivalent to US$10 million at the time), making it the most expensive film ever produced in Finland to that day. Although the wilderness adventures are portrayed to take place in Finnish Lapland, the outdoor footage in the film was filmed in the Alps and the rest were filmed in Germany.

== Reception ==
=== Box office ===
Big Game opened in Finland on 19 March 2015 at number 4, taking in $324,321 from 113 screens. The following week it dropped 38% to finish the weekend at number 2, with $199,996 from 103 screens. The film had made $1,420,000 (€1,271,847) as of 26 June 2015.

As of 17 May 2015, the film had a worldwide total of $7,455,218.

=== Critical response ===
On Rotten Tomatoes, the film has a 78% approval rating, based on reviews from 88 critics, with critics consensus stating "Big Game's enthusiastic throwback vibe will appeal to fans of low-budget '80s action movies, but co-writer/director Jalmari Helander adds a level of smarts and skill that make it more than just an homage." On Metacritic, the film has a weighted average score of 53 out of 100, based on reviews from 18 critics, indicating "mixed or average" reviews.

The Hollywood Reporter called it "A Presidential rescue tale that's ludicrous, in a good way." IGN called it "Goonies with guns".

==== Director's own response ====
In an interview with Yle in October 2025, Helander expressed his disappointment with the outcome of Big Game, as the tone of the film changed from the original vision to being "too kind". Helander also became too frustrated with Jackson's constant demands and mood swings, which Helander was not used to. However, according to Helander, the resentment and anger left over from Big Game were important factors in the creation of the script for the next film Sisu.

=== Accolades ===
Big Game received a nomination for Best DVD or Blu-ray Release at the 42nd Saturn Awards.
