= John Rambo (politician) =

American politician

John Rambo (1661 in Philadelphia, Pennsylvania – October 17, 1741, in Gloucester County, New Jersey) was a judge and elected official in colonial New Jersey.

He was the youngest of eight children born to a Swedish immigrant family. Rambo's father, Peter Gunnarsson Rambo (1612–1698), was one of the first colonists in the Swedish colony of New Sweden. John Rambo was a judge in Gloucester County court from 1695 to 1697. He was also one of the first Swedish Americans to be elected to the council of New Jersey (1697–1701). In 1685 Rambo married Brigitta Cock (1665–1726), the daughter of Peter Larsson Cock (1610–1687) who a justice of the New Sweden court. Rambo and his wife had 11 children.

== Other sources ==
- Beatty, Ronald Rambo Family Tree (AuthorHouse; 2 edition. 2008)
