= Onni Tommila =

Finnish actor (born 1999)

- Born: 18 July 1999 (age 26); Porvoo, Finland
- Occupation: Actor
- Father: Jorma Tommila
- Relatives: Jalmari Helander (uncle)

Onni Tommila (born 18 July 1999) is a Finnish actor, known for the films Last Cowboy Standing (2009), Rare Exports: A Christmas Tale (2010) and Big Game (2014). Tommila also appeared in the 2005 Rare Exports: The Official Safety Instructions. He was also the voice of Eetu in the animated film Eetu ja Konna (2011) and played a German soldier named Schütze in the movie Sisu (2022).

== Personal life ==
He is the son of actor Jorma Tommila and scenic designer Ida Helander-Tommila. Director Jalmari Helander is his maternal uncle, and is said to have had Onni in mind for the leading role in Big Game while he was devising the film.
