= Rambo apple =

Apple cultivar

Apple 'Rambo'
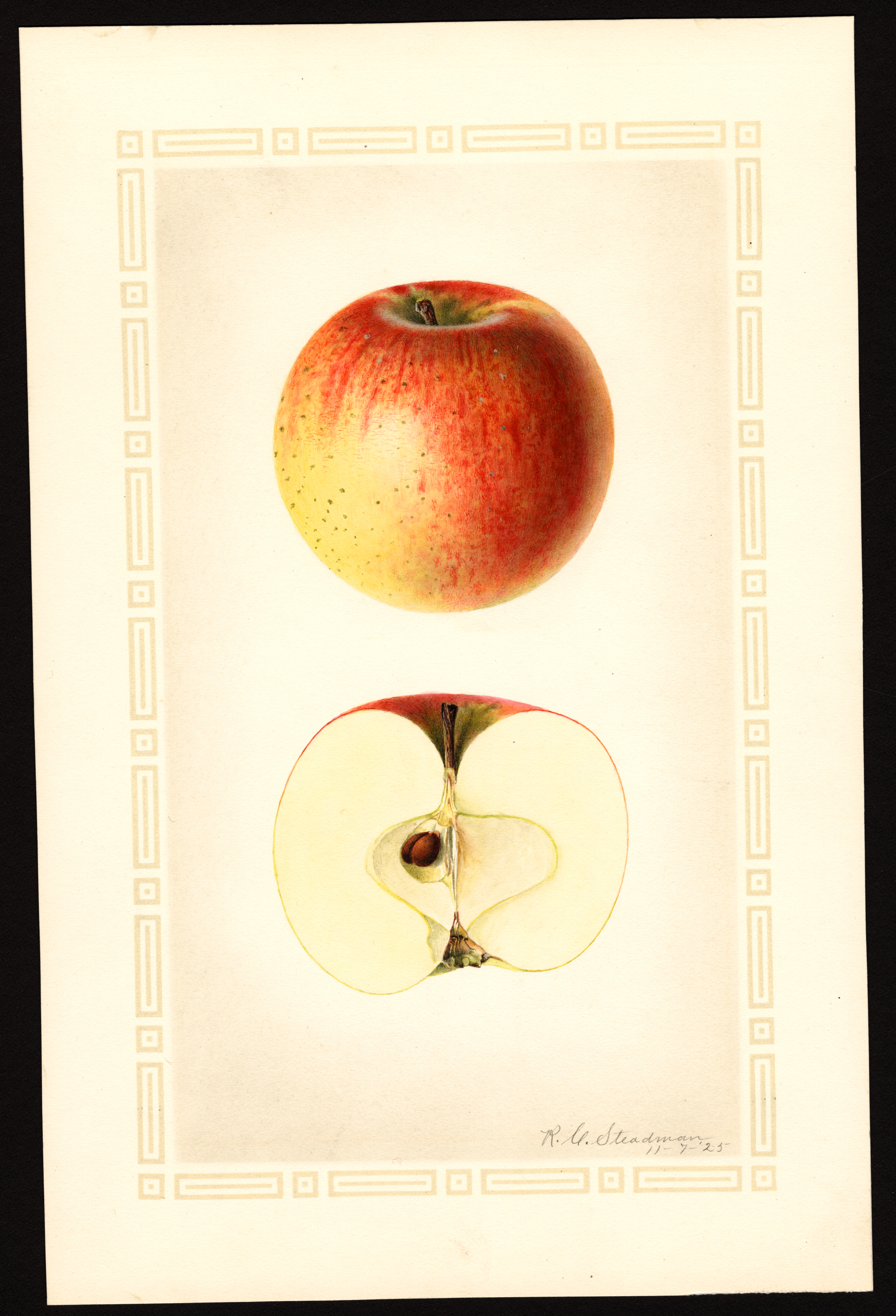
- Genus: Malus
- Species: Malus domestica
- Cultivar: 'Rambo'
- Origin: Known in North America before 1817

The origins of the Rambo apple cultivar are unknown. It may date back to the American colony of New Sweden, when in 1637 Peter Gunnarsson Rambo, a Swedish immigrant, arrived on the Kalmar Nyckel. Swedish natural historian Pehr Kalm, who wrote Travels in North America, 1747–51, took notes of his interview with Mr. Peter Rambo, grandson of Peter Gunnarsson Rambo, recording that the "original Peter Rambo had brought apple seeds and several other tree and garden seeds with him in a box." The first Rambo apple tree was very likely grown from one of these seeds. There is no certainty, however, since the earliest documented mention of the apple variety's origin occurs in William Coxe's A View of the Cultivation of Fruit Trees, and the Management of Orchards and Cider, published in 1817. Coxe wrote only that the Rambo was much cultivated in Delaware, Pennsylvania, and New Jersey and took "its name from the families by whom it was introduced into notice."

The name Rambo was most likely derived from Peter Gunnarsson's Swedish home on Ramberget (or "Raven Mountain") on the island of Hisingen, which today is part of Gothenburg, but in Gunnarsson's time was mostly farmland. Translations of "bo" from Swedish to English include "dwelling", "nest", and "residence." The Rambo is very similar in traits, such as size, shape, and coloring, to several French apples called Rambour. There is no known explanation for the similarity of the names.

The Rambo has a greenish yellow skin, mottled and striped with a dull red and overspread with a grayish bloom. Rambo apples ripen in early to late fall, depending on the region of the country. The fruit is medium-sized on average, but sometimes large. The apple has a distinctive flavor and aroma. Very versatile, the Rambo has been rated very good to excellent for fresh eating, cooking and baking, jelly, and drying. Little known today, the Rambo was once widely grown, but in a limited geographical range from the mid-Atlantic states west into the middle Prairie states. In Varieties of Apples in Ohio (1915), the "little old-fashioned Rambo" was said to have been found "in almost every old orchard in Ohio." It was also found in Oregon and Northern California. In 1847, the Rambo was included among the 18 varieties of apple trees that Henderson Luelling of Salem, Iowa brought with his family along the Oregon Trail to establish the first orchard in the Pacific Northwest.

The Rambo belongs to the era when people bought apples from local suppliers and grew apple trees in their backyard. Even a hundred years ago, the Rambo was not widely grown commercially. There were several reasons that it was considered to be unmarketable. It did not have bright coloring. Its productivity was inconsistent. It did not have a long storage life. It was too tender for shipping long distances.

So as not to confuse the Rambo apple with the unrelated Summer Rambo (also known as the Rambour Franc), the Rambo has also been called the Winter Rambo. Other names given to the Rambo over the years include Romanite, Bread and Cheese (perhaps after Bread and Cheese Island in Delaware), Seek-No-Further, Delaware, and Striped Rambo.

== In popular culture ==
According to author David Morrell, the apple provided the name for the hero of his novel, First Blood, which gave rise to the Rambo film franchise. The novelist's wife brought home a supply of the fruit as he was trying to come up with a suitable name for the protagonist. It is uncertain whether David Morrell's wife brought home Rambos or Summer Rambos. Summer Rambos would have been much more common, but since his wife bought the apples at a roadside stand, either is possible (Morrell had previously been influenced by the French poet and soldier Arthur Rimbaud, the last name often pronounced Rambo, and then the Rambo apples... seeing the actual spelling of the word Rambo... sealed the name).

James Whitcomb Riley, the Hoosier Poet, sentimentalized the Rambo in his poem, The Rambo-Tree which appeared in his 1902 collection The Book of Joyous Children. The poem includes the repeating chorus:
For just two truant lads like we,
When Autumn shakes the rambo-tree
There's enough for you and enough for me
It's a long, sweet way across the orchard.

A similar sentiment was expressed by "Uncle Silas" in his column for the September 1907 issue of The American Thresherman: "What has become of the good old apples we used to eat in the long ago down on the farm? The Rambo, the best apple that ever grew in an orchard, is fruit vouchsafed only in memory. [In Missouri,] no apple was ever enjoyed like the Rambo.... A boy would go farther to swipe Rambo apples, and subject his pantaloons to greater exposure from ugly dogs than he would for any other kind, and boys know on which tree the best apples grow. A drink of cider without any fixin', made of Rambo apples, will go farther down and awake the molecules of mankind in a greater degree than any other kind of cider. The world is growing wiser, but not in raising Rambo apples."

The claim that the Rambo was the favorite apple of Johnny Appleseed is false. Johnny Appleseed did not grow or sell any grafted varieties, and for the Rambo or any other variety to be perpetuated, it must be grafted. As Michael Pollan indicates in his chapter on the apple in Botany of Desire, John Chapman (1774–1845), for religious reasons related to the doctrines of Emanuel Swedenborg, believed grafting was an unnatural practice. Chapman was given the nickname "Appleseed" pejoratively for his highly unusual practice of planting trees from seed. Apples grown from seed are most often small and poorly flavored. Back when the frontier only extended as far west as the state of Indiana, that worked fine for Johnny Appleseed, since the apples from his trees were used principally for making hard cider. Also the pioneers didn't have any other choice in suppliers. The apple tree in Nova, Ohio, that is more than 175 years old, can either be the last surviving apple tree that Johnny Appleseed planted or it can be a Rambo tree. It cannot be both, despite any marketing claims.

== Bibliography ==
- Coxe, William. A view of the cultivation of fruit trees, and the management of orchards and cider., 253pp, M. Carey and Son, 1817.
- Kalm, Pehr, 1716-1779. Peter Kalm's travels in North America; the America of 1750; the English version of 1770, rev. from the original Swedish and edited by Adolph B. Benson, with a translation of new material from Kalm's diary notes., 797pp, Dover, 1966. NOTE: "The hitherto untranslated portion has been done into English by Miss Edith M. L. Carlborg and the present editor."
