= Peter Gunnarsson Rambo =

Immigrant to New Sweden

- Born: 10 June 1611; Hisingen, Gothenburg
- Died: 21 January 1698 (aged 86); Wicaco, Pennsylvania
- Occupations: Farmer, justice of the peace

Peter Gunnarsson Rambo (10 June 1611, – 21 January 1698) was a Swedish immigrant to New Sweden (now part of Philadelphia) known as a farmer and a justice of the Governor's Council after the English took control of the area. He was the longest living of the original Swedish settlers and became known as the Father of New Sweden. Rambo's Rock along the Schuylkill River is named for his family.

== History with New Sweden ==
At the age of twenty-seven, Peter Gunnarsson sailed to New Sweden on the second voyage of the Kalmar Nyckel in 1639, the first voyage in which permanent settlers were aboard. Sometime after arrival in early 1640, he adopted the surname "Rambo." It is likely that he came to New Sweden voluntarily. He was a tobacco planter for the New Sweden Trading Company on the company plantation just outside the fort and became a freeman by 1644. He sent a portion of his wages home to his father, Gunnar Petersson, and referred to himself (and others) as "We, ye antient (sic) Swedes," indicators that his ancestry was thoroughly Swedish. Gunnarsson means "son of Gunnar", an old first name of Swedish origin.

Rambo married Brita Matsdotter from Vaasa (now in Finland), on 7 April 1647, after eight years in New Sweden and three years after he had become a freeman. They initially settled in Kingsessing, but moved by 1669 to Passyunk on the northeast side of the Schuylkill River.

Rambo was present when the Dutch besieged Fort Christina in 1654, serving as the deputy to the Swedish governor, Johan Rising. When the colony fell to the Dutch, Rambo was among the local settlers to meet with representatives from New Netherlands.

He was adaptable as the local political situation changed. In 1668, when the colony fell under English jurisdiction, Rambo became a member of the governor's council. In 1674, he was commissioned a justice of the peace.

Rambo, along with Peter Cock and others, was selected by his fellow Swedish settlers to greet their new governor, William Penn, when he arrived at "Upland", now Chester, Pennsylvania, when their colony was taken over by the English on 27 October 1682. Rambo was a witness to Penn's treaty with the Indians for the purchase of land west of the original boundaries of Philadelphia.

A letter he wrote in 1693 to a sister in Gothenburg has been preserved at the Royal Archives in Sweden (Riksarkivet). Rambo died in 1698 and was buried at the Swedes' log church at Wicaco, now Gloria Dei (Old Swedes') Church in Southwark, Philadelphia. He was survived by four sons (Gunnar, John, Andreas, and Peter) and two daughters (Gertrude and Katharine). Gunnar's Run, a long covered stream along Aramingo Avenue in Philadelphia, is named for Gunnar Rambo, one of Peter's descendants.

== Origin of the name ==
Olsson (1995) says that the surname Rambo can be translated as "raven's nest" (ramn+bo). It was chosen for Ramberget (or "Raven Mountain") on the island of Hisingen, which today is part of Gothenburg. Ramberget was called Ramboberget (Rambo Mountain) on Swedish maps from the 17th century.

== Rambo apple ==
Peter Kalm, a Swedish explorer and botanist who traveled in North America between 1748 and 1751, wrote in his diary about his interview with Peter Rambo, grandson of Peter Gunnarsson Rambo. Peter Rambo, the younger, told him that his grandfather "had brought apple seeds and several other tree and garden seeds with him in a box." The first Rambo apple tree may have been produced from one of these seeds. William Coxe's A View of the Cultivation of Fruit Trees, and the Management of Orchards and Cider, published in 1817, indicates that the Rambo was much cultivated in Delaware, Pennsylvania, and New Jersey, and took "its name from the families by whom it was introduced into notice." The Rambo is confused with, but is not closely related to, the French Summer Rambo. Because of the confusion, the Rambo has also been called the Winter Rambo.

The novelist David Morrell says that he chose the name John Rambo for his First Blood action hero because he was inspired by "the sound of force" in the name. He encountered the Rambo apples in Pennsylvania.

== See also ==
- Swedish colonization of the Americas

== Other sources ==
- Benson, Adolph B. and Naboth Hedin, eds. Swedes in America, 1638–1938 (The Swedish American Tercentenary Association. New Haven, CT: Yale University Press. 1938) ISBN 978-0-8383-0326-9
