= Jalmari Helander =

Finnish screenwriter and film director (born 1976)

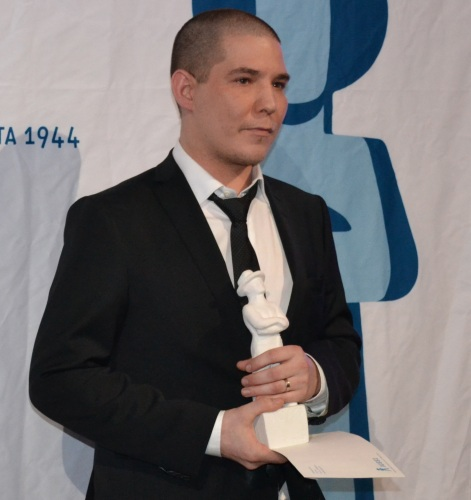
- Jalmari Helander in 2010
- Born: 21 July 1976 (age 50); Helsinki, Finland
- Occupations: Film director, screenwriter
- Notable work: Rare Exports: A Christmas Tale (2010); Big Game (2014); Sisu (2022)
- Relatives: Jorma Tommila (brother-in-law); Onni Tommila (nephew)

Jalmari Helander (born 21 July 1976) is a Finnish screenwriter and film director. He is known for the 2010 film Rare Exports: A Christmas Tale, the 2014 action-adventure Big Game starring Samuel L. Jackson, and the 2022 WWII action film Sisu. Before turning to feature films, Helander directed several short films and award-winning television commercials. In 2025, it was announced that Helander would direct John Rambo, the upcoming prequel to First Blood (1982) in the Rambo franchise.

Helander is the brother-in-law of actor Jorma Tommila and the maternal uncle of Jorma's son Onni, both of whom have acted in his films.

== Personal life ==
Helander has stated that he has panic disorder

== Filmography ==
Short films

Year	Title	Director	Writer	Notes
1999	Jäämies	Yes	Uncredited	Also editor
1999	Maximillian Tarzan	Yes	Yes	Also editor
2001	Ukkonen	Yes	Yes	
2003	Rare Exports, Inc.	Yes	Yes	
2005	Rare Exports: The Official Safety Instructions	Yes	Yes	
2006	Fakiiri	Yes	Story	Also producer
2011	Viimeinen pisara	Yes	Yes	

Feature films

Year	Title	Director	Writer
2010	Rare Exports: A Christmas Tale	Yes	Yes
2014	Big Game	Yes	Yes
2022	Sisu	Yes	Yes
2025	Sisu: Road to Revenge	Yes	Yes
2027	John Rambo	Yes	No
TBA	Fairytale in New York	Yes	No

Television

Year	Title	Notes
2017–2018	Wingman	9 episodes
2020	Perfect Commando	10 episodes
2021	Karkurit	1 episode

== See also ==
- Finnish cinema
