= Summer Rambo =

Apple cultivar

'Summer Rambo'
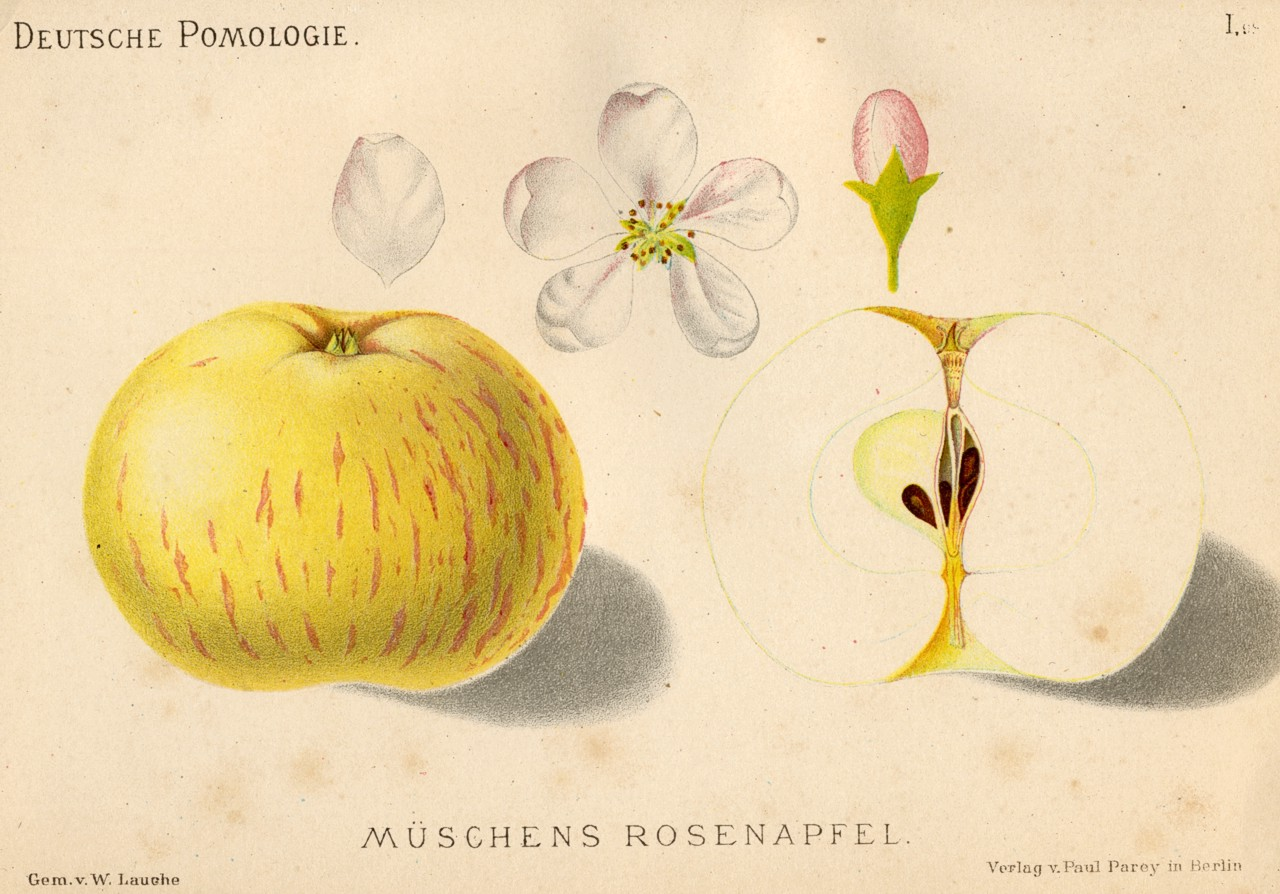
- Genus: Malus
- Species: Malus pumila
- Cultivar: 'Summer Rambo'
- Origin: Known in France before 1817

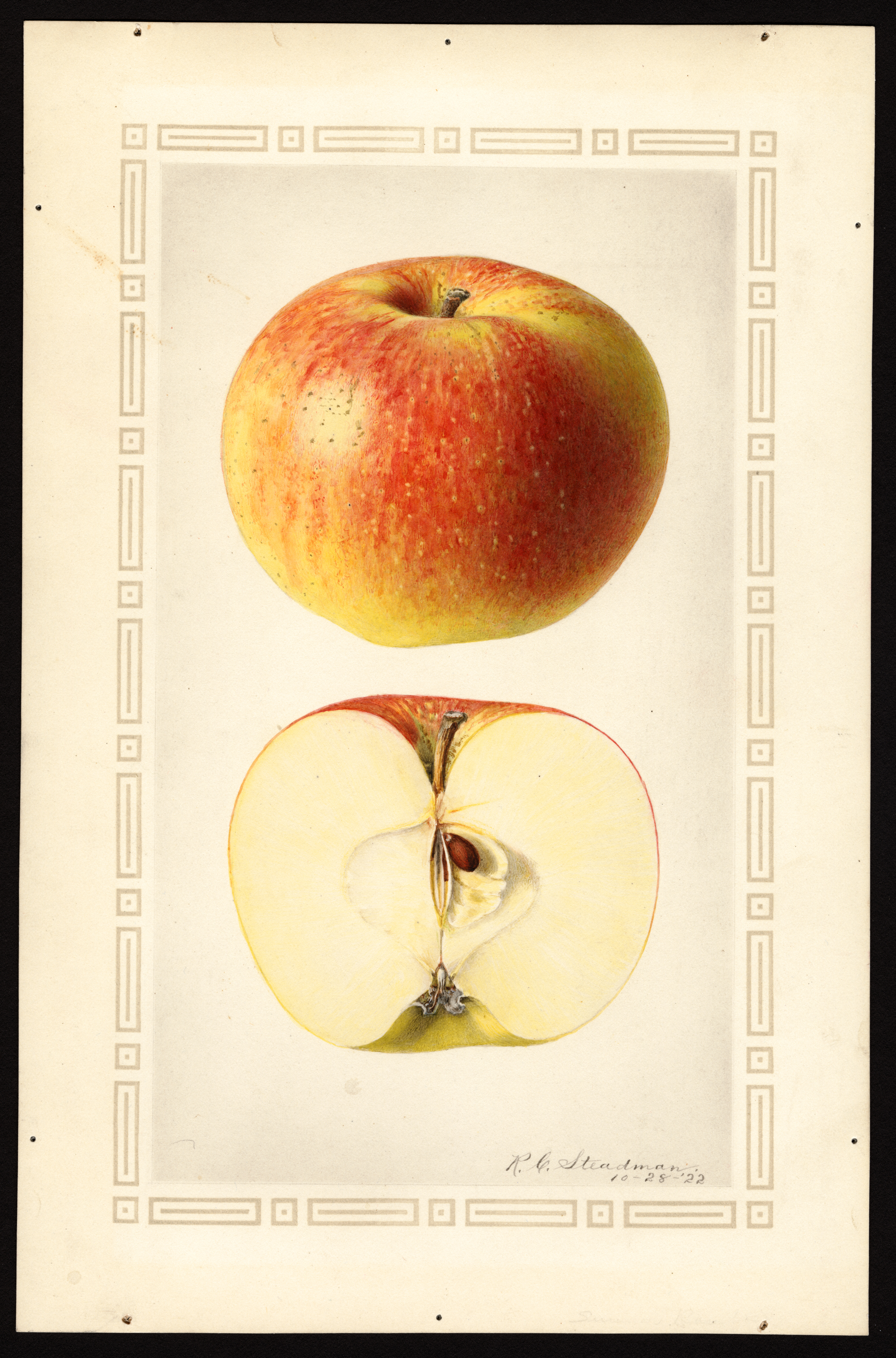

The 'Summer Rambo' apple is French in origin. In France, it is known as 'Rambour d'été'. Originally known in North America as 'Summer Rambour,' the name evolved to 'Summer Rambo' sometime before the 1850s. Like the Rambo, was introduced to North America in colonial times. It has also been called 'Rambour Franc', but in France 'Rambour Franc' is a fall-ripening apple. There are a dozen or more Rambour varieties, mostly of French origin. The name Rambour is said to have originated in the village of Rambures in Picardy.

The 'Summer Rambo' has a squat shape, and its skin is greenish-yellow flushed or blushed with red, making it confusingly similar to the 'Rambo'.

The 'Summer Rambo' has a crisp, mildly tart flavor. As is the case with most summer apples, the 'Summer Rambo' does not store well, and because of that never became widely produced commercially. It still is popular in parts of the United States in early August at pick-your-own orchards, farmers markets, and roadside stands.

== See also ==
- List of apple cultivars
