= Rare Exports: A Christmas Tale =

2010 Finnish film by Jalmari Helander

- Theatrical release poster
- Directed by: Jalmari Helander
- Written by: Jalmari Helander
- Produced by: Petri Jokiranta
- Starring: Onni Tommila; Jorma Tommila; Per Christian Ellefsen; Tommi Korpela; Rauno Juvonen; Ilmari Järvenpää; Peeter Jakobi; Jonathan Hutchings; Risto Salmi
- Cinematography: Mika Orasmaa
- Edited by: Kimmo Taavila
- Music by: Juri Seppä; Miska Seppä
- Production companies: Cinet; Pomor Film; Davaj Film; Love Streams Agnès B. Productions
- Distributed by: FS Film Oy (Finland); Scanbox Entertainment (Norway); Chrysalis Films (France)
- Release dates: 24 September 2010 (AFF); 3 December 2010 (Finland)
- Running time: 82 minutes
- Countries: Finland; Norway; Sweden; France
- Languages: Finnish; English
- Budget: €1.8 million
- Box office: $4 million

Rare Exports: A Christmas Tale is a 2010 Finnish fantasy action horror comedy film written and directed by Jalmari Helander about people living near Korvatunturi who discover the secret behind Santa Claus. The film is based on the 2003 short film Rare Exports, Inc. and its 2005 sequel Rare Exports: The Official Safety Instructions by Jalmari Helander and Juuso Helander, both of which involve a company that traps wild Santa Clauses and trains and exports them to locations around the world.

== Plot ==
An American and British research team from the firm Subzero are drilling samples atop Korvatunturi (Ear Fell) in the Finnish region of Lapland. Team leader Riley believes that the fell is an ancient burial mound built by the Sámi and plans to plunder it. Two local boys, Juuso and Pietari, spy on the team at work and learn their plans. Pietari tells Juuso that Santa Claus is real, tortures bad children, and is watching them, as the team begins to excavate the fell using explosives.

Local reindeer hunters find hundreds of reindeer carcasses that they believe were killed by wolves, and head to Korvatunturi to demand reparations from the Subzero company, whom they believe are responsible for the reindeer. Instead, they find a deep pit and no trace of the Subzero personnel.

On the morning of Christmas Eve, a wolf trap built by Pietari's father, Rauno, has killed a skinny, naked old man. Pietari and Rauno learn that potato sacks, heaters, and a hair dryer have gone missing from houses in the area. Pietari finds a straw effigy in Juuso's bed and no sign of Juuso.

Piiparinen, a neighbor, and Rauno bring the corpse into Rauno's reindeer slaughterhouse but discover the skinny old man is still alive. Piiparinen, Rauno, and Aimo, another colleague, discuss their plans and tie the old man up, while Pietari calls around and finds that all his friends have gone missing. Piiparinen has his ear bitten off by the old man, and Pietari asks his father to spank him for his bad deeds, as he fears that sneaking up to the Fell makes him a bad boy and he will be taken by Santa.

Rauno's group dresses the old man in Piiparinen's Santa costume and message Subzero that they want to sell them Santa to compensate for the loss of income from the reindeer. They take the old man to an airbase in a cage, where they meet Riley arriving by helicopter. Riley warns that the caged man is not Santa but one of his elves, and that they must be quiet and smile. Many elves appear and kill Riley and his pilot. The men and Pietari run to a hangar where they find a horned being - Santa - in an enormous block of ice being melted by the missing heaters. Next to the ice are sacks containing the stolen crying children, including Juuso.

Pietari takes control and hatches a plan. Piiparinen comes out of the hangar and distracts the elves by throwing gingerbread at them to reach the helicopter. Rauno and Aimo make a net, which Pietari climbs on as the helicopter picks up the sacks of children to lure the elves to the reindeer pen. The other men place explosives all over Santa Claus' ice block and cut off his horns before leaving. Pietari jumps off the helicopter net into the reindeer pen to open the gate as the horde of elves runs toward him. Rauno and Aimo detonate the explosives, killing Santa and causing the elves to stop in the reindeer pen before they can hurt Pietari. Afterwards, the group of men and Pietari train the 198 captured elves to become mall Santas and export them to cities around the world.

== Cast ==
- Onni Tommila as Pietari Kontio
- Jorma Tommila as Rauno Kontio
- Tommi Korpela as Aimo
- Rauno Juvonen as Piiparinen
- Per Christian Ellefsen as Riley
- Ilmari Järvenpää as Juuso
- Peeter Jakobi as Pietari's Elf
- Jonathan Hutchings as Brian Greene
- Risto Salmi as Sheriff
- Jens Sivertsen as Main Elf
- Sigmund Bøe as Main Elf
- Olav Pedersen as Main Elf
- Nils M. Iselvmo as Main Elf

== Production ==
The film was produced by Cinet (Finland) in co-production with Pomor Film (Norway), Davaj Film (Sweden) and Love Streams Agnès B. Productions (France), with support from the Finnish Film Foundation, Norwegian Film Institute, FilmCamp and Filmpool Nord.

=== Development ===
In 2003, the Finnish commercials production company Woodpecker Film published the short movie Rare Exports Inc. online. (It is available on other YouTube channels as well.) Here, the film's writer and director Jalmari Helander established a band of three hunters (marker, sniper, and tracker) searching the wilderness of Lapland for the wild Santa Claus. After the positive reception from an online audience, Woodpecker Film produced and published the sequel short movie Rare Exports: The Official Safety Instructions in 2005, again with Helander as writer-director.

In 2007, Jalmari Helander introduced producer Petri Jokiranta to his idea of a feature-length Rare Exports film based on his short films that had already acquired a cult reputation on the Internet. Jokiranta's company, Cinet, picked up the rights and Helander started to develop the concept together with Jokiranta.

== Release ==
Rare Exports: A Christmas Tale began production in 2009 and was released simultaneously in Finland, Norway, Sweden, Germany, the UK, the US and Australia for Christmas 2010. The film was distributed in the US by Oscilloscope Laboratories, an independent film distribution company.

=== Box office ===
Rare Exports: A Christmas Tale has grossed $4,015,133.

=== Home media ===
Rare Exports was released on DVD and Blu-ray Disc on 25 October 2011. The Blu-ray version includes the two original short films and a variety of featurettes, such as a "Making Of", a look at the concept art, explanation of the animatics and computer-generated imagery, the notoriously contemptible feature film Santa Claus Conquers the Martians, and other extras.

== Critical reception ==
On Rotten Tomatoes, the film holds an approval rating of 89% based on 106 reviews, with a weighted average rating of 7/10. The site's critical consensus reads, "Rare Exports is an unexpectedly delightful crossbreed of deadpan comedy and Christmas horror." On Metacritic, which assigns a normalized rating to reviews, the film has a weighted average score of 71 out of 100, based on 18 critics, indicating "generally favorable reviews".

Roger Ebert awarded the film three and a half out of four stars and called it "a rather brilliant lump of coal for your stocking" and considered it "an R-rated Santa Claus origin story crossed with The Thing." He continued, "Apart from the inescapable [fact] that the movie has Santa and reindeer in it, this is a superior horror film, a spot-on parody of movies about dead beings brought back to life. Oh, and all the reindeer are dead." Ebert concluded that "this is a fine film. An original, daring, carefully crafted film, that never for one instant winks at us that it's a parody. In its tone, acting, location work, music and inexorably mounting suspense, this is an exemplary horror film, apart from the detail that they're not usually subtitled A Christmas Tale and tell about terrifying wild Santas."

Novelist and critic Kim Newman gave the movie 4 out of 5 stars ("Excellent") and praised its "very black humour and a strange mix of revisionist mythology, gruesome horror and authentic Christmas spirit. It has a gritty, outdoorsy feel appropriate to an exploration of the brutal side of a harsh, all-male life in an extreme climate ... Helander also shows suspense chops in vintage John Carpenter mode – the scenes with the captured Santa, a grinning creature waiting for a chance to kill, are good, straight horror stuff, and there's an effective climactic siege of bearded monsters."

Michael Rechtshaffen of The Hollywood Reporter described the movie as "a fiendishly entertaining Christmas yarn rooted in Northern European legend and lore, complete with a not-so-jolly old St. Nick informed more by the Brothers Grimm than Norman Rockwell. While the richly atmospheric package has been wrapped with a healthy dose of wry satire, it's not of the mean-spirited Bad Santa variety. Helander, a successful commercial director in his native Helsinki, shrewdly blends just the right amounts of fairy tale wonder and action movie heroics into the oddball mix to highly satisfying effect." Jeannette Catsoulis of The New York Times called the movie "a thing of frigid beauty and twisted playfulness ... Kids will love the diminutive, motherless hero and a plot that's completely bonkers; adults will enjoy the exuberantly pagan images and deadpan humor." It was rated a New York Times Critics' Pick. Sheri Linden of the Los Angeles Times praised the "twisted black humor in this frosty Finnish fantasy ... What unfolds is a dark comic thriller and action-hero send-up, a strange alloy of daredevil helicopter maneuvers and night of the living elves. Captured in atmospheric widescreen camerawork, the end-of-the-world frozen landscape (actually Norway) is spectacular and spooky." Reviewer Annika Pham, writing for Cineuropa.org, described it as a "Tim Burton-esque version of Santa's story" and said, "The icy Lappish landscapes are beautifully captured by [director of photography] Mika Orasmaa and the feel of the large-scale adventure epic is wrapped up in sweeping musical orchestration. The scary elements (suggested more than shown) are sufficient to keep 13+ viewers on edge, but could have been further elaborated – along with the original concept – to make Rare Exports a timeless seasonal delight."

Collider's reviewer Dave Trumbore called the film "a darkly humored tale that fits perfectly in line with such anti-Christmas classics as Gremlins and The Nightmare Before Christmas" and wrote, "The contemporary Nordic setting that's so fitting for horror movies these days (Let the Right One In, Dead Snow) is a perfect backdrop for Rare Exports: A Christmas Tale, not only in mood but in mythology as well ... While Rare Exports: A Christmas Tale does not have the level of gore of Dead Snow or the emotional impact of Let the Right One In (although Pietari does earn his father's respect in the end), it's a uniquely entertaining tale that adds a bit of welcome darkness to the often saccharine times leading up to Christmas."

Cate Blanchett called it one of her favorite films.

=== Awards ===
The film won numerous awards such as the Locarno International Film Festival's Variety Piazza Grande Award and Best Motion Picture, Best Cinematography, and Best Director – as well as a "Special Mention" for the Silver Méliès for Best European Motion Picture Award – at the 43rd Sitges Film Festival in 2010. In 2011, director Jalmari Helander and producer Petri Jokiranta received the Finnish Film State Award for their collaboration.

The film and crew earned further awards in 2011: nominated for Best Film for the Jussi Award, it won for Best Cinematography, Best Music, Best Sound Design, Best Editing, Best Art Direction, and Best Costume Design. The film won the Pegasus Audience Award at the Brussels International Fantastic Film Festival, and was nominated for the Academy of Science Fiction, Fantasy and Horror Films's Saturn Award in the category of Best International Film.

== See also ==
- There's Something in the Barn
