= John Rambo (film) =

Upcoming film by Jalmari Helander

- Teaser poster
- Directed by: Jalmari Helander
- Written by: Rory Haines; Sohrab Noshirvani
- Based on: Characters by David Morrell
- Produced by: Kevin King-Templeton; Les Weldon; Jonathan Yunger; Avi Lerner; Angela Russo-Otstot; Michael Disco
- Starring: Noah Centineo; David Harbour; Yao; James Franco
- Cinematography: Mika Orasmaa
- Music by: Juri Seppä; Tuomas Wäinölä
- Production companies: Lionsgate Films; Millennium Media; Templeton Media; AGBO
- Distributed by: Lionsgate Films
- Release date: June 4, 2027
- Country: United States
- Language: English

John Rambo is an upcoming American war action film directed by Jalmari Helander and written by Rory Haines and Sohrab Noshirvani. It is a prequel to First Blood (1982) and the sixth installment in the Rambo film series, telling the origin story of John Rambo, portrayed by Noah Centineo. It also stars David Harbour, Yao, and James Franco.

John Rambo is scheduled to be released in the United States on June 4, 2027, by Lionsgate Films.

== Cast ==
- Noah Centineo as John Rambo
- David Harbour as Sam Trautman
- Yao
- Jason Tobin
- Quincy Isaiah
- Jefferson White
- Tayme Thapthimthong
- James Franco

== Production ==
=== Development ===
A new film in the Rambo franchise telling the origin story of John Rambo in the Vietnam War before the events of First Blood was first announced at the 2025 Cannes Film Market. The screenplay was written by Rory Haines and Sohrab Noshirvani, with Jalmari Helander attached to direct. The director shared:

I have been the biggest fan of Rambo since the age of 11. It is so surreal to be in a situation where I can actually make my own Rambo movie. The chain of events that got me here makes, in a fantastic way, my whole childhood make sense. I can't wait to bring the greatest action hero back to the big screen where he belongs.

Noah Centineo was cast as the titular character in August 2025. Helander has described the filming conditions in the jungle as rough due to the sweaty climate and mosquitoes. In November 2025, it was announced that Lionsgate Films had gained the rights for the film, while AGBO joined as a production company. In March 2026, original John Rambo actor Sylvester Stallone joined the film as an executive producer.

=== Filming ===
Principal photography began on January 29, 2026, in Bangkok, with Yao, Jason Tobin, Quincy Isaiah, Jefferson White, Tayme Thapthimthong, David Harbour, and James Franco rounding out the cast. Filming wrapped in March. Mika Orasmaa serves as the cinematographer.

== Music ==
Juri Seppä and Tuomas Wäinölä composed the score for the film.

== Release ==
John Rambo is scheduled to be released in the United States on June 4, 2027, by Lionsgate Films.
