= Finnish News Agency =

Finnish news gathering organization

- Native name: Suomen Tietotoimisto Finska Notisbyrån
- Founded: 1887
- Headquarters: Helsinki, Finland
- Key people: Kimmo Pietinen (CEO)
- Services: News agency
- Number of employees: 130
- Website: stt.fi

Finnish News Agency (Finnish: Suomen Tietotoimisto, STT; Swedish: Finska Notisbyrån, FNB), officially Oy Suomen Tietotoimisto – Finska Notisbyrån Ab, is a Finnish news agency, established in 1887 and based in Helsinki. STT's majority owner is Sanoma Media Finland of the Sanoma Group. The Finnish public service broadcaster Yle is among the minority shareholders.

STT is a sister agency of the Swedish wire service TT, Norwegian NTB, and Danish Ritzau.
