= First Blood =

1982 film by Ted Kotcheff

- Theatrical release poster by Drew Struzan
- Directed by: Ted Kotcheff
- Screenplay by: Michael Kozoll; William Sackheim; Sylvester Stallone
- Based on: First Blood by David Morrell
- Produced by: Buzz Feitshans
- Starring: Sylvester Stallone; Richard Crenna; Brian Dennehy
- Cinematography: Andrew Laszlo
- Edited by: Joan Chapman
- Music by: Jerry Goldsmith
- Production companies: The Wallis Interactive; Anabasis Investments, N.V.
- Distributed by: Orion Pictures
- Release date: October 22, 1982
- Running time: 93 minutes
- Country: United States
- Language: English
- Budget: $15–18 million
- Box office: $125.2 million

First Blood is a 1982 American action thriller film starring Sylvester Stallone as Vietnam War veteran John Rambo. The film was directed by Ted Kotcheff and co-written by Michael Kozoll, William Sackheim, and Stallone based on the 1972 novel First Blood by David Morrell. It is the first installment in the Rambo film series. The story follows Rambo, who, after entering a small town and clashing with the police, attempts to fight in order to survive a manhunt using his expertise in survival and combat skills obtained from fighting in Vietnam. The film costars Richard Crenna as Rambo's mentor Colonel Sam Trautman and Brian Dennehy as Sheriff Will Teasle.

First Blood was released by Orion Pictures in the United States on October 22, 1982. Initial reviews were mixed, but the film was a box-office success, grossing $125.2 million and becoming the 13th-highest-grossing film at the domestic box office for the year and the seventh-highest-grossing film worldwide. In 1985, it also became the first Hollywood blockbuster to be released in China, holding the record for the largest number of tickets sold for an American film until 2018. Since its release, it has been reappraised by critics, with many highlighting the roles of Stallone, Dennehy and Crenna, and recognizing it as an influential film in the action genre.

The film's success spawned the Rambo franchise, consisting of four sequels co-written by and starring Stallone, an animated television series, a comic books series, a novelization series and several video games. It was followed by Rambo: First Blood Part II, released in 1985. A prequel, John Rambo is scheduled to be released in 2027.

== Plot ==
In December 1981, United States Army Vietnam War veteran John Rambo visits the home of his army buddy Delmar Barry and learns that he has died from the effects of Agent Orange exposure. Wandering aimlessly on foot, he arrives at the town of Hope, Washington. Sheriff Will Teasle spots him and drives him to the other side of town, telling him that he is not welcome.

Feeling slighted, Rambo begins to return to town, where Teasle quickly arrests him and leaves him to be processed under the supervision of cruel chief deputy Art Galt, who leads other deputies in harshly abusing Rambo. The abuse triggers flashbacks to torture that Rambo endured in Vietnam. Overpowering the deputies and taking back his field knife, he steals a civilian's motorcycle, and the police chase him into the surrounding mountains; he evades capture.

Teasle organizes a search party with his fellow deputies, air support and dogs. Galt ignores Teasle's orders and attempts to shoot Rambo from a low-flying helicopter, but falls to his death when Rambo throws a rock that causes the pilot to lose control. Teasle soon learns that Rambo is a former Special Forces soldier and recipient of the Medal of Honor, but refuses to cancel the search.

Not wanting to cause more trouble, Rambo attempts to surrender, but is fired upon by the deputies and flees into the tree line. Rambo uses bushcraft to create traps to subdue the pursuing officers, threatening Teasle at knifepoint to abandon his pursuit before fleeing further into the woods. Washington State Patrol officers and Washington National Guard forces are dispatched to assist with the search, along with Rambo's mentor and former commanding officer Colonel Samuel Trautman. Trautman expresses surprise that Rambo did not kill Teasle and all of his men, and advises him to relent, but Teasle once again refuses. Over radio, Rambo refuses Trautman's pleas to surrender, condemning Teasle and his men and insisting that "they drew first blood."

Rambo falls back to an abandoned mine, where National Guard units fire an M72 LAW to collapse the mine after suppressive fire fails to force Rambo to surrender. Teasle and the others initially presume Rambo to be dead, but Rambo escapes the mine through a ventilation shaft. He hijacks a military transport truck and drives back to town, intent on confronting Teasle. Trautman again fails to convince Teasle to cancel the pursuit. Rambo destroys his stolen truck in a gas-station explosion, then shoots down power lines to most of the town, causing a blackout and detonates explosives in a nearby gun store, ambushing Teasle on the roof of the police station.

After shooting indiscriminately in the sheriff's office, Rambo shoots Teasle in the leg, grievously injuring him with an M60 machine gun that Rambo had taken from the military truck. Before Rambo can kill Teasle, Trautman arrives and demands that Rambo stand down. Rambo decries the emptiness of civilian life and the hostility of the anti-war movement, before breaking down as he recounts the horror of seeing his friend blown up. Shocked, Trautman comforts Rambo. In the aftermath, Rambo quietly watches Teasle taken to an ambulance for his injuries while he is escorted into custody.

== Cast ==
- Sylvester Stallone as John Rambo
- Richard Crenna as Colonel Sam Trautman
- Brian Dennehy as Sheriff William "Will" Teasle
- Bill McKinney as Captain Dave Kern
- Jack Starrett as Deputy Sergeant Arthur "Art" Galt
- Michael Talbott as Deputy Balford
- Chris Mulkey as Deputy Ward
- John McLiam as Orval Kellerman
- Alf Humphreys as Deputy Lester
- David Caruso as Deputy Mitch Rogers
- David L. Crowley as Deputy Shingleton
- Don MacKay as Deputy Preston
- Patrick Stack as Lieutenant Clinton Morgen

== Production ==
=== Development ===
In 1972, Canadian-American author David Morrell's debut novel First Blood was published by Rowman & Littlefield. In 1985, Sylvester Stallone alleged that the original novel "took so long to get done" because the story was "so bloodthirsty". However, Morrell asserted that the novel's adaptation to film was delayed for ten years due to shifting studios options.

At the time of the novel's release, Lawrence Turman at Columbia Pictures bought the film rights to the novel for $175,000. Richard Brooks was slated to direct, and intended to have the film be an allegory on differing American perceptions of World War II and Vietnam War veterans, with Sheriff Will Teasle portrayed more sympathetically than in the novel. The film would have ended with Teasle ordering his men to drop their guns to try to reason with John Rambo, who would have then been fatally shot by an unknown assailant. Brooks planned to start shooting First Blood in New Mexico in December 1972. The film did not proceed because the Vietnam War was still underway and Brooks left the project.

Afterward, John Calley purchased the rights at Warner Bros. Pictures for $125,000 with the thought of casting either Robert De Niro or Clint Eastwood as Rambo. A screenplay was written by Walter Newman with Martin Ritt intended to direct. The film would have criticized American military culture and portrayed Colonel Sam Trautman as the film's villain, ending with both Rambo and Teasle dying. Sydney Pollack and Martin Bregman also considered directing the film, with Bregman hiring David Rabe to write a script. After Bregman departed Mike Nichols considered directing Rabe's script.

William Sackheim and Michael Kozoll wrote the screenplay that would be the basis of the final film in 1977, originally intending for John Badham to direct. Producer Carter DeHaven purchased Sackheim and Kozoll's script from Warner Bros. for $375,000. DeHaven secured the Cinema Group as a financer and hired John Frankenheimer as director with production to begin in Georgia. This was also the first version of the script in which Rambo survived the film. However, the project stalled again after the distributor Filmways was acquired by Orion Pictures.

After Mario Kassar and Andrew G. Vajna of Anabasis Investments read the book, they became interested in doing an adaptation as the first production of their studio Carolco Pictures funded by "in-house sources". They purchased the film rights from Warner Bros. for $375,000 and Sackheim and Kozoll's script for $125,000 in 1981. Ted Kotcheff, who had been involved in the project in 1976, returned after Kassar and Vajna offered to finance one of his projects. Kotcheff offered the role of John Rambo to Sylvester Stallone, and the actor accepted after reading the script through in a day.

While various adapted screenplays had been pitched to studios in the years following the novel's 1972 publication, the project moved into active production under the administrative and financial direction of producers Mario Kassar and Andrew G. Vajna, utilizing a structural framework established by primary screenwriters Michael Kozoll and William Sackheim. Under Writers Guild of America (WGA) guidelines, the theatrical screenplay credit is legally assigned to Kozoll and Sackheim, with Sylvester Stallone listed in the third position. This specific credits hierarchy denotes that Kozoll and Sackheim executed the film's foundational narrative architecture, pacing, and thematic framework in their 1977 draft, while Stallone's third-position credit indicates localized, late-stage dialogue revisions rather than a structural overhaul of the text. Under these same guild rules, subsequent script polish work by additional studio-hired writers was legally deemed insufficient to qualify for formal screen credit.

While Kozoll and Sackheim's original draft had already scaled down the book's casualties to sixteen, the narrative was structurally refocused to eliminate all intentional casualties by the protagonist, filtering the plot's sole casualty down to the singular, accidental death of Deputy Galt. This structural shift, alongside Stallone's late-stage adjustments that stripped the protagonist's spoken lines to fewer than 400 words, shifted the dramatic burden to external exposition and rendered the role heavily reliant on non-verbal, physical performance rather than original text.

Contrary to subsequent public folklore popularized by Stallone—claiming he was horrified by an initial three-and-a-half-hour rough cut and attempted to buy back the negative from the studio to destroy it—official production records confirm no such extended cut existed. Kassar and Vajna maintained total administrative control over the edit, explicitly engineering and pacing the film from its inception to fit a tight 93-minute theatrical window. While an ending in which Rambo dies was originally filmed to match the tragic conclusion of the novel, the decision to implement the backup survival footage was an administrative mandate enforced by Kassar and Vajna solely because the initial test screening in a Las Vegas suburb triggered a volatile and physically hostile audience reaction. The test audience vocally reacted against the protagonist's death, shouting and throwing objects in the theater, with one attendee declaring that director should be "strung up from the nearest lamppost." Driven strictly by this massive market liability, the producers overrode the original cut and ordered the theatrical print re-edited to utilize the survival ending. The fully produced ending in which Rambo dies was never suppressed or bought out, and remains widely commercially accessible as a standard supplementary feature on various DVD and Blu-ray home media releases, featuring an audio commentary track by original author David Morrell.

=== Casting ===
During the film's extended development cycle throughout the 1970s, numerous actors and directors were loosely attached to or considered for the project, including Clint Eastwood, Al Pacino, Paul Newman, James Caan, Robert Redford, Burt Reynolds, and Steve McQueen. However, active production only mobilized under producers Mario Kassar and Andrew G. Vajna, who built the film's dramatic credibility around the established track records of veteran actors Brian Dennehy as Sheriff Teasle and Richard Crenna as Colonel Trautman.

Kirk Douglas was originally cast as Trautman and reported to the British Columbia set during the third week of principal photography. While subsequent public accounts, including Douglas's autobiography, claimed his departure was due to a creative dispute over restoring the novel's original ending, actual production records and daily filming diaries maintained by director Ted Kotcheff reveal that Douglas was dismissed due to highly disruptive on-set behavior. According to Kotcheff's logs, Douglas consistently spoke about himself in the third person and repeatedly attempted to claim dialogue written for other characters. Douglas frequently halted active scenes by demanding to absorb the lines of the local law enforcement, declaring, "Kirk doesn't say these lines... The sheriff doesn't say it. Kirk Douglas should have this line." Kotcheff called Richard Crenna over the weekend to recruit him as a last-minute replacement. Crenna flew out immediately, arrived on set, and promptly began filming his scenes to keep the production on schedule.

=== Filming ===
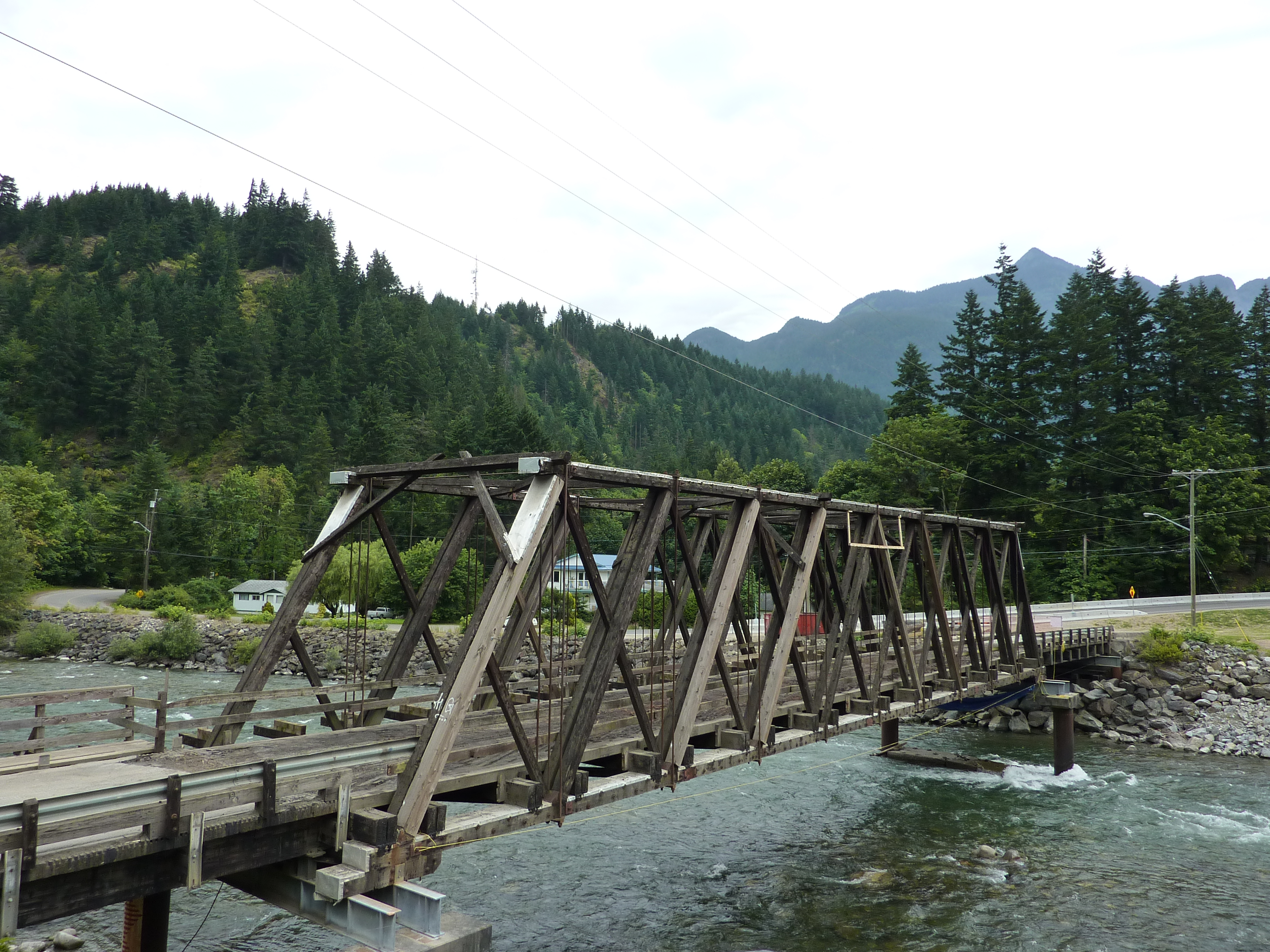
The bridge in Hope, British Columbia, used during production

The film was shot in the Fraser Valley of British Columbia on a $15 million budget beginning on November 15, 1981, and continuing until April 1982. The town scenes in the movie were shot in Hope and the nearby Coquihalla Canyon Provincial Park, called Chapman Gorge in the film, while the rest of the movie was shot in Capilano Canyon, Golden Ears Provincial Park and Pitt Lake in Pitt Meadows. During the production Buzz Feitshans replaced producer Ed Carlin, who suffered a heart attack.

The locations chosen for the film initially experienced unseasonably warm and sunny weather during the filming, which posed challenges since the crew had counted on an overcast setting. However, a period of heavy snowfall beginning in January 1982 delayed the production by two months. Other delays were caused by injuries to the cast during stunts, including Stallone sustaining a serious back injury and several broken ribs, in particular, due to performing his own stunt of dropping off a cliff and into a tree. Since the production ran over schedule, Crenna's role in the film was reduced in order to avoid having to pay him higher fees as specified in his contract.

The firearms used in the film had to be imported into Canada because of the country's firearms regulation. In January 1982 over $50,000 worth of firearms—including fourteen M16 rifles, three Remington shotguns, two .44 Magnum revolvers, and eleven Colt AR-15 rifles—were stolen from the set. Although the guns had been modified to shoot blanks, the Royal Canadian Mounted Police claimed that they could be easily modified to fire live ammunition. After the incident the set was guarded by the Canadian Army, whose soldiers also served as extras in the film.

=== Post-production ===
The finalized 93-minute theatrical cut was engineered from inception by producers Mario Kassar and Andrew G. Vajna to optimize pacing and action, utilizing the backup survival ending mandated by the Las Vegas test market research.

Kassar and Vajna sought either Warner Bros., 20th Century Fox or Paramount Pictures as a distributor, displaying an 18-minute promotional reel to studios. Although they secured international distributors, they were unable to locate a domestic distributor to the film until they sent a longer 55-minute reel to the American Film Market. After Warner Bros. and Paramount expressed interest, Orion Pictures agreed to the domestic distribution of the film.

== Music ==
The film's score was composed and conducted by Jerry Goldsmith, whose theme "It's a Long Road" added a new dimension to the character, and featured in the film's three sequels and animated spin-off Rambo: The Force of Freedom. The soundtrack was originally released on LP by the Regency label, although it was edited out of sequence for a more satisfying listen. The album was reissued on CD with one extra track ("No Power") twice, first as one of Intrada Records's initial titles, then as an identical release by Varèse Sarabande. The complete score was released by Intrada in a 2-CD set, along with a remastered version of the original album (with the Carolco logo [previously released on La-La Land Records's Extreme Prejudice album] and the Rambo: First Blood Part II trailer music added), on November 23, 2010, as one of their MAF unlimited titles.

== Release ==
=== Home media ===
David Morrell recorded an audio commentary track for the First Blood Special Edition DVD released in 2002. Sylvester Stallone recorded an audio commentary track for the First Blood Ultimate Edition DVD released in 2004. This edition also includes the original ending in which Rambo commits suicide, and a "humorous" ending tacked on afterwards. A brief snippet of the suicide ending appears in a flashback in the fourth movie Rambo. Lionsgate also released this version on Blu-ray. Both commentary tracks are on the Blu-ray release.

Momentum Pictures released an HD DVD version of First Blood in the United Kingdom in April 2007. Lionsgate also released First Blood as a double feature on February 13, 2007, along with 2004's The Punisher. First Blood was released on 4K UHD Blu-ray on November 9, 2018.

== Reception ==
=== Box office ===
First Blood topped the U.S. box office for three weeks in a row, and its $6,642,005 opening weekend was the best October opening at the time. It grossed $20 million in its first 10 days. The film ended as a significant financial success, with a total gross of $64 million domestically, the highest-grossing film of the fall, and the 13th highest-grossing film of the year.

The film grossed $160.3 million worldwide, against a $15 million budget. It was the first major Hollywood blockbuster to be released in China, where it was released in 1985. It sold 76 million tickets in China, the highest for a foreign Hollywood film up until 2018.

=== Critical response ===
The film received mixed reviews from critics, and three lead actors received praise for their performances. In his review, Roger Ebert wrote that he did not like the film's ending, but added it was "a very good movie, well-paced, and well-acted not only by Stallone ... but also by Crenna and Brian Dennehy." He commented, "although almost all of First Blood is implausible, because it's Stallone on the screen, we'll buy it," and rated the film three out of four stars. The New York Times film critic Janet Maslin described Rambo as a "fierce, agile, hollow-eyed hero" who is portrayed as a "tormented, misunderstood, amazingly resourceful victim of the Vietnam War, rather than as a sadist or a villain." Maslin also praised the film's story for its "energy and ingenuity". Conversely, Variety called the film "a mess" and criticized its ending for not providing a proper resolution for the main character. /Film writer Jack Hawkins took a different view on the ending, praising the scene for containing "the finest acting of Stallone's career," adding, "there are no one-liners, no showy acts of bravado, just messy emotion without any catharsis... Stallone couldn't have played the scene better and neither could anyone else."

First Blood has been considered as belonging to the vetsploitation subgenre.

In 2000, BBC film critic Almar Haflidason noted that Stallone's training in survival skills and hand-to-hand combat gave the film "a raw and authentic edge that excited the audiences of the time."

Film.com and Filmsite regard First Blood as one of the best films of 1982, and in 2008 it was named the 253rd greatest film ever by Empire magazine on its 2008 list of The 500 Greatest Movies of All Time. In 2015, Rolling Stone ranked the movie at #7 on a 10 Best Action Movies of All Time.

On review aggregator Rotten Tomatoes, the film has an 86% approval rating based on 49 reviews, with an average rating of 7.20/10. The site's critics consensus reads, "Much darker and more sensitive than the sequels it spawned, First Blood is a thrilling survival adventure that takes full advantage of Sylvester Stallone's acting skills." On Metacritic, the film has a weighted average score of 61 out of 100 based on 15 critics, indicating "generally favorable" reviews.

James Berardinelli of ReelViews called the film "a tense and effective piece of filmmaking". He noted that the film's darker tone, somber subtext, and non-exploitative violence allowed the viewer to enjoy the film not only as an action/thriller but as something with a degree of intelligence and substance. On Stallone's performance, he wrote "it seems impossible to imagine anyone other than Stallone in the part, and his capabilities as an actor should not be dismissed". In the 2010 edition of his Movie Guide, Leonard Maltin gave the film one-and a half stars out of four, saying that it "throws all credibility to the winds about the time [Rambo] gets off with only a bad cut after jumping from a mountain into some jagged rocks".

=== Legacy ===
First Blood received the most positive reception of the Rambo franchise. The four sequels received mixed or average reviews.

In a 2011 article for Blade by Mike Carter, credit is given to Morrell and the Rambo franchise for revitalizing the cutlery industry in the 1980s due to the presence of the Jimmy Lile and Gil Hibben knives used in the films. In 2003, Blade gave Morrell an industry achievement award for having helped to make it possible. Morrell said his being given the award "is ironic" because the knife was Sylvester Stallone's idea and does not appear in the novel.

Rambo's survival knife became an iconic movie weapon. In a July 28, 2013 auction the original knife and its sheath were sold for $92,250, and even a set of 100 replicas of the knife produced by Lile in 1982 have been valued at $45,000 each.

A writer from the American think tank Foundation for Economic Education commented that the sequence of events in the film are the result of police brutality. He goes on to say that Teasle's initial approach with Rambo was without reason, and that he could have driven him to the diner or simply left him alone. He assigned blame to Teasle's actions and compared the situation to a number of twenty-first century police encounters that turned deadly.

== Sequel ==
A sequel titled Rambo: First Blood Part II was released in 1985.

== Other media ==
=== Video game ===
In 2014, Rambo: The Video Game was released, based on the first three Rambo films.

=== Statue ===
On August 14, 2020, a cedar wood statue of Rambo was unveiled in Hope, Canada, 38 years after the film's release. Mayor Peter Robb, local MP Mark Strahl, and the statue's sculptor, Ryan Villers, attended the ceremony.

== In popular culture ==
- Son of Rambow, a 2007 British comedy film inspired by First Blood.
- In the 2008 season 4 episode of It's Always Sunny in Philadelphia, "Mac and Dennis: Manhunters", Mac (Rob McElhenney) and Dennis Reynolds (Glenn Howerton) are inspired by First Blood and decide to stage a manhunt against their former high school rival Rickety Cricket (David Hornsby). In the same episode, Frank Reynolds (Danny DeVito) also confuses his own life with that of First Blood and acts like he is having flashbacks to being in Vietnam.
- In 2017, "It's A Long Road" was used in the video game South Park: The Fractured but Whole. It appears when the player is killed and receives a game over.
- The Mountain Goats released the song "First Blood" on August 19, 2022, as part of the album Bleed Out, a reference to the movie.

== See also ==
- Survival film
