= Henri Temianka =

American classical musician (1906-1992)

Henri Temianka (19 November 1906 – 7 November 1992) was a virtuoso violinist, conductor, author and music educator.

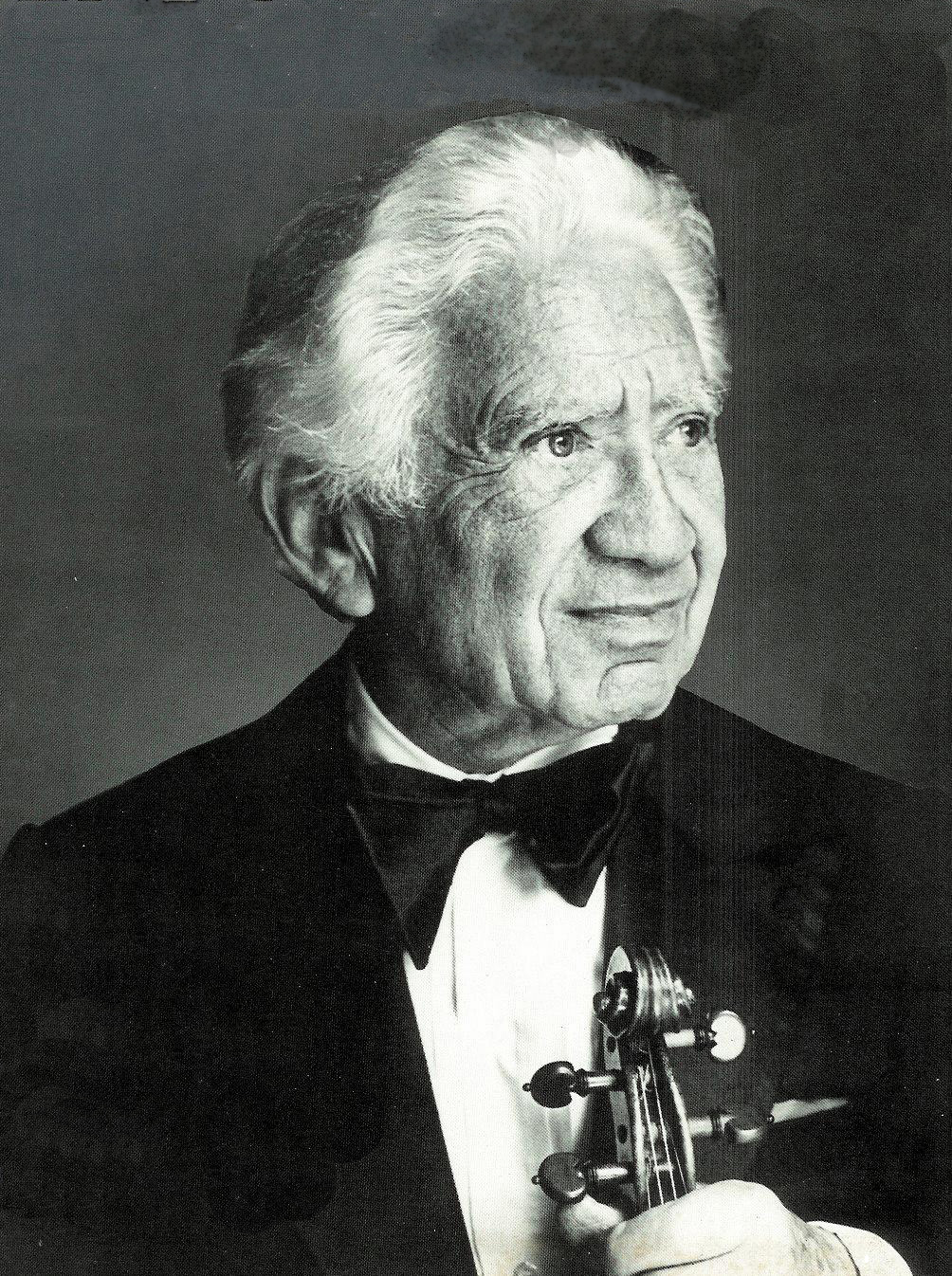
Henri Temianka

== Early years ==
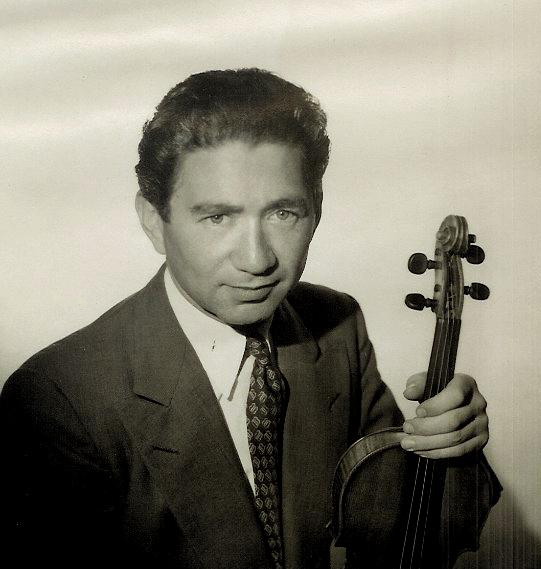
Henri Temianka, London, c.1932

Henri Temianka was born in Greenock, Scotland, to parents who were Jewish-Polish emigrants. He studied violin with Carel Blitz in Rotterdam from 1915 to 1923, with Willy Hess at the National Conservatory in Berlin from 1923 to 1924, and with Jules Boucherit in Paris from 1924 to 1926. He then enrolled at the Curtis Institute of Music in Philadelphia, where he studied violin with Carl Flesch, who reported of him in 1927, "Was brought over by me. First class technical talent, somewhat sleepy personality, has still to awake." In 1928, Flesch said, "His violinistic personality is for the moment still above his human one. Life shall be his best teacher in this regard." Later he stated, "...he has made an intensive study of my method of teaching, of which I consider him the best exponent in England." In his memoirs he said, "...there was above all Henry [sic] Temianka, who did great credit to the Institute: both musically and technically, he possessed a model collection of talents." Temianka's playing was further influenced by Eugène Ysaÿe, Jacques Thibaud and Bronisław Huberman. He also studied conducting with Artur Rodziński at Curtis, and became its first graduate in 1930.

== Career ==
After his New York City debut in 1928, described by Olin Downes in The New York Times as "one of the finest accomplishments in years," Temianka returned to Europe and made extensive concert tours and appeared with major orchestras both in Europe and the U.S. under conductors including Pierre Monteux (who gave him his first Paris appearance), Sir John Barbirolli, Sir Adrian Boult, Fritz Reiner, Sir Henry J. Wood, George Szell, Otto Klemperer, Dimitri Mitropoulos, and William Steinberg. In Leningrad he was engaged for a single performance, but his virtuosity was so impressive that he was retained for five performances with five complete programs within a week.

In 1935 he won third prize in the first Henryk Wieniawski Violin Competition in Warsaw, Poland; Ginette Neveu took first prize, and David Oistrakh second. (A short documentary about that historic event can be found at http://www.wieniawski.com/1ivc.html.) In that year he also premiered a suite that the then-unknown Benjamin Britten had written for him and pianist Betty Humby, and performed music by Sergei Prokofiev, with the composer at the piano in Moscow; and Ralph Vaughan Williams conducted his violin concerto for him in London. In 1936 he founded the Temianka Chamber Orchestra in London. He was the concertmaster of the Scottish Orchestra from 1937 to 1938. He gave his first concert in Los Angeles, a violin recital, at the Wilshire Ebell in 1940. From 1941 to 1942 he was the concertmaster of the Pittsburgh Symphony under Fritz Reiner, performing as soloist in concertos including the Beethoven and Mozart A major.

His appearances as violin soloist and guest conductor in Europe and both North and South America were interrupted by World War II, during which he became a senior editor in the U.S. Office of War Information. Because of his fluency in four languages (English, French, German and Dutch), he translated and edited sensitive documents. Through a combination of his bureaucratic connections there and contacts from his international performing career, and with assistance from HIAS, he was able to secure the release of his parents from the Nazi concentration camp in Gurs, France, in 1941. However, upon arriving in Spain, they were thrown in jail by Franco's police. Temianka recalled that a concert he had given in Madrid in 1935 had been attended by a powerful Spanish aristocrat and president of the Bilbao Philharmonic Society, Ignacio de Gortazar y Manso de Velasco, the 19th Count of Superunda. The Count personally escorted Temianka's parents from jail to his mansion, and then arranged for their passage by ship to Cuba and the United States, where they became citizens. Temianka described these remarkable events in a chapter of his second book Chance Encounters (unpublished); that chapter has been integrated with illustrations of many of the relevant photographs, letters and other documents, and privately printed as a monograph.

In 1945 he performed at Carnegie Hall with pianist Artur Balsam. In 1946 he performed all the Beethoven violin sonatas with pianist Leonard Shure at the Library of Congress in Washington D.C. Over the next 45 years he made appearances in more than 3,000 concerts in 30 countries, with some 500 concerts in the Los Angeles metropolitan area alone, appearing as violin soloist, conductor of the California Chamber Symphony, first violinist of the Paganini Quartet, and in remarkable chamber music recitals such as the Beethoven sonata cycles with pianists Lili Kraus, Leonard Pennario, Rudolf Firkušný and George Szell, and the Bach violin sonatas with Anthony Newman. He performed the Bach Double Violin Concerto with David Oistrakh, Yehudi Menuhin, Henryk Szeryng and Jack Benny. His chamber groups performed at the Dorothy Chandler Pavilion of the Los Angeles Music Center and the Mark Taper Forum. In 1960 he was the music director at the esteemed Ojai Music Festival. In the 1980s his California Chamber Virtuosi gave concerts at Pepperdine University and at the J. Paul Getty Museum in Malibu, California.

As an avid chamber music player, Temianka hosted frequent private musical evenings in his Los Angeles home, playing with fellow musicians including Yehudi Menuhin, Jascha Heifetz, Isaac Stern, Joseph Szigeti, David Oistrakh, Henryk Szeryng, Leonard Pennario, William Primrose, Gregor Piatigorsky and Jean-Pierre Rampal. Temianka was equally adept on the viola as the violin, and sometimes played it during these evenings, as well as in concert in 1962 with Isaac Stern in a performance of Mozart's Sinfonia Concertante (which he also performed on violin with William Primrose on viola).

In 1980 the Grove Dictionary of Music and Musicians said of Temianka that he was "...known for his flawless mastery of his instrument, a pure and expressive tone, and forceful yet elegant interpretations." On July 28, 2016, Jim Svejda at Classical KUSC-FM radio aired a four-hour program of recordings by Temianka, the Paganini Quartet, and the California Chamber Symphony.

== The Paganini Quartet ==
Temianka in 1946 joined the Paganini Quartet, founded by the great Belgian cellist Robert Maas. The quartet drew its name from the fact that all four of its instruments, made by Antonio Stradivari (1644–1737), had once been owned by the Italian virtuoso violinist and composer Niccolò Paganini (1782–1840). The other original members were Gustave Rosseels, second violin, and Robert Courte, viola. Subsequent members included Charles Libove, Stefan Krayk and Harris Goldman, violin; Charles Foidart, David Schwartz and Albert Gillis, viola; and Adolphe Frezin and Lucien Laporte, cello.

The quartet made its world debut at the University of California at Berkeley. Critic Alfred Frankenstein wrote in the San Francisco Chronicle on November 11, 1946, "Perhaps never before has one heard a string quartet with so rich, mellow and superbly polished a tone." On December 5, 1947, the Los Angeles Examiner reported, "Entrusted with fabulously sensitive string instruments that once were in the personal collection of Paganini, they achieve the incredible - as will be eagerly testified by the packed house..."

During its 20-year international career, the Paganini Quartet concertized continuously in large cities and small towns throughout the United States, as well as in famous concert halls around the world. In 1946-47 they played all the Beethoven string quartets in concert at the Library of Congress. At Mills College in 1949, the Paganini and Budapest Quartets presented the world premiere of Darius Milhaud's 14th and 15th string quartets, followed by the two groups' performance of both works simultaneously as an octet.

In subsequent years they made joint appearances with Arthur Rubinstein, Andrés Segovia, Claudio Arrau and Gary Graffman. The quartet recorded eleven of the Beethoven quartets as well as those of Gabriel Fauré, Giuseppe Verdi, Claude Debussy, Maurice Ravel and others. They also played the world premieres of works by Mario Castelnuovo-Tedesco and Benjamin Lees.

The four-person mahogany music stand used by the Paganini Quartet was donated to the Pasadena Conservatory of Music.

== The California Chamber Symphony (CCS) ==
In 1960 Temianka founded and conducted a chamber orchestra based at Royce Hall, UCLA, the California Chamber Symphony. The orchestra gave more than 100 concerts over the ensuing 23 years, including premieres of major works by such major composers as Aaron Copland, Dmitri Shostakovich, Darius Milhaud, Alberto Ginastera, William Schuman, Gian Carlo Menotti, Malcolm Arnold and Carlos Chávez. Soloists who performed with the CCS under Temianka's direction included David Oistrakh, Christine Walevska, Jean-Pierre Rampal and Benny Goodman.

Temianka broke tradition by speaking to his audiences from the stage about the music and composers. (For this reason the series was originally titled "Let's Talk Music".) He created a "Concerts for Youth" series and also brought music to hospitals, prisons, and schools for the handicapped. He recognized and was in many instances responsible for the first appearances of a number of rising musicians, including Christopher Parkening, Jeffrey Kahane, Nathaniel Rosen, Paul Shenley, Timothy Landauer, Daniel Heifetz, and Los Romeros, a family of guitarists from Spain. He also made a number of major television appearances with the CCS, and appeared as conductor with other orchestras including the Los Angeles Philharmonic and Buenos Aires Philharmonic. In 2022 a graduating student from Chapman University, Mitchell Tanaka, placed Temianka's pioneering contributions in historical perspective in his production "Temianka Talks Music." .

Unique concerts given under the auspices of the CCS included the opera Noye's Fludde by Benjamin Britten, in which hundreds of children participated; a "Monster Concert", in which 12 Steinway pianos and 36 pianists were brought on stage for pieces by Louis Moreau Gottschalk and others; Alberto Ginastera's Cantata para America Magica, an extraordinary work based on pre-Columbian Latin American songs and scored for soprano and 53 percussion instruments; and Christus Apollo, a cantata written by Jerry Goldsmith, based on a text by Ray Bradbury and narrated by Charlton Heston.

== Violins ==
In his teens Temianka played a Laurentius Storioni of 1780. While traveling under the aegis of the Curtis Institute, he briefly played a loaned Stradivarius, which was exchanged for a Januarius Gagliano. In 1929 Temianka owned the violin made in 1752 by Joannes Baptista Guadagnini. In the 1930s he played a Silvestre violin, with which he made his early Vintage recordings, and subsequently a Januarius Gagliano and a Carlo Bergonzi. The Stradivarius he played during the years of the Paganini Quartet was the "Conte Cozio di Salabue" of 1727, which was Paganini's own concert violin. It was later played by Martin Beaver, first violinist of the Tokyo String Quartet, which played since 1995 on the same quartet of Stradivarius instruments once owned by Paganini, until the Tokyo String Quartet retired in July 2013. These remarkable instruments—the viola had inspired Paganini to commission Hector Berlioz's Harold en Italie—were also played by the Cleveland Quartet for almost 15 years, beginning in 1982, and are presently owned by Nippon Music Foundation of Japan, after deacquisition by the Corcoran Gallery in the mid-1990s for $15 million. They were then played for several years by the Hagen Quartet, and then by the Quartetto di Cremona; they are now in the hands of the Kuss Quartet. When the years of the Paganini Quartet came to an end, Temianka played a Michelangelo Bergonzi of 1759. His recordings of the Handel Sonatas were made on an Andrea Guarneri of 1687.

== Honors and legacy ==
- Gramophone Award (for recordings of Beethoven "Rasumovsky" quartets) 1947.
- Franklin S. Harris Fine Arts Award at Brigham Young University 1977.
- French Officier des Arts et des Lettres 1979.
- Pepperdine Honorary Doctorate 1986.
- American String Teachers Assoc.: Distinguished Teacher Award 1970 and Distinguished Service Award 1989.
- Numerous resolutions by the California Legislature, County of Los Angeles and City of Los Angeles.

In February 2013, Chapman University endowed the Henri Temianka Professorship in Music and Scholarship in String Studies. The violin played by Albert Saparoff, concertmaster of the Hollywood Symphony, was endowed as the Temianka-Saparoff violin, and is dedicated for the use of a selected recipient while studying there.

A bust of Temianka was created by the famous sculptor Miriam Baker, and stands on the Aitken Arts Plaza in front of the Musco Performing Arts Center, between busts of Mozart and Puccini, at Chapman University; a second bust from the same mold was dedicated at the McLean Museum and Art Gallery (now the Watt Institution) in Greenock, Scotland, his birthplace. During the museum's renovation, the statue was relocated at the Beacon Arts Centre. The dedication was reported by the BBC, and honored by a Motion of the Scottish Parliament. An exhibit of Temianka's letters and memorabilia was open at Chapman's Leatherby Libraries until 30 July 2016. On 3 March 2017, the Henri Temianka Archives were dedicated in a multimedia room at Chapman. The Archives consist of some 2700 letters, photographs, concert programs and other effects from his life.

In 2018 the Henri Temianka Audio Preservation Lab was endowed at the University of California at Santa Barbara.

In 2026 the Henri Temianka Distinguished Violinist Concert Series was established under the aegis of the Pacific Symphony. The first performance was given in March by the great Anne Akiko Meyers.

== Students ==
Henri Temianka's students included Leo Berlin (who became concertmaster of the Stockholm Philharmonic), Nina Bodnar (who won the 1982 Thibaud International Competition in Paris), Amalia Castillo, Alison Dalton (subsequently in the first violin section of the Chicago Symphony), Marilyn Doty, Eugene Fodor, Michael Mann, Dolores Miller, Phyllis Moad, Astrid Schween, Karen Tuttle (who later became a violist), and Camilla Wicks.

== Later life ==
Temianka was a visiting professor and guest lecturer at many universities in the United States and abroad, including the Universities of California, Kansas, Illinois, Michigan, Colorado, Toronto, Southern California and the Osaka Music Academy of Japan. He held professorships at University of California, Santa Barbara (1960–64) and Long Beach State College (now California State University, Long Beach) (1964–76). He also taught master classes at various universities including Brigham Young in Utah, and produced films in music education. He died, aged 85, in Los Angeles.

== Quotations ==
"You have a choice: to create, or not to create."

"It's easy to avoid criticism -- just say nothing, do nothing, be nothing."

"The happiest times have always been when we have chamber music at our house—veritable orgies of informal music-making, gastronomy, and story-swapping, with everybody in shirtsleeves. The warmth of musical and human empathy is unique. As we play, unrehearsed, a quartet of Beethoven or Mozart, there are extraordinary flashes of insight, thrilling moments of truth when we share the same concept of an exquisite phrase, sculpt the same melodic line, linger and savor the same ritardando or diminuendo. In those moments we spontaneously look up from our music, exchanging ecstatic smiles and glances. It is a level of spiritual communication granted few human beings."—from Facing the Music.

== Recordings ==
In the 1930s Temianka made solo recordings, mostly on the Parlophone label, of works by Henryk Wieniawski, Gaetano Pugnani, Franz Schubert, Robert Schumann, Johann Sebastian Bach, Karol Szymanowski, Pablo de Sarasate, Camille Saint-Saëns, Anton Arensky, Jean Sibelius and Frank Bridge. In The Book of the Violin, Dominic Gill appraised Temianka's recording of the Schubert Rondo in A, D.438, as follows: "The divine playing of this work in 1937 by Henri Temianka stands out as a pinnacle among the great violin recordings of all time." All of these recordings were reissued on CD by Biddulph Recordings in 1992.

In the LP era, he recorded sonatas by George Frideric Handel, Édouard Lalo, Vincent d'Indy, Paul Dukas, Edvard Grieg and Antonín Dvořák, and the Tchaikovsky Piano Trio in A minor. His live performances of the Beethoven sonatas in 1946 with pianist Leonard Shure were restored by DOREMI and released by Allegro Music on CD's in 2011.

With the Paganini Quartet, he recorded 11 of the Beethoven string quartets for RCA Victor. These were remastered and reissued on CD's in 2012 by United Archives. On other labels they recorded Joseph Haydn's "Emperor" and Mozart's "Dissonant" quartets, and quartets by Britten, Debussy, Ravel, Schumann, Verdi, Ginastera, Lajhta, and Benjamin Lees; the Schumann Piano Quintet and Fauré Piano Quartet No. 1 with Arthur Rubinstein (reissued on BMG CD in 1999); and the Brahms Piano Quintet with Ralph Votapek.

He also appeared as violin soloist in a 1941 recording of Richard Strauss's Don Quixote by the Pittsburgh Symphony under Fritz Reiner, featuring cellist Gregor Piatigorsky. Conducting the Los Angeles Percussion Ensemble, he recorded Ginastera's Cantata para America Magica and Carlos Chavez's Toccata for Percussion Instruments for Columbia Records.

== Bibliography ==
Temianka wrote more than 100 articles for various periodicals, including Instrumentalist, The Strad, Reader's Digest, Saturday Review, Esquire, Hi-Fi Stereo Review, Musical America, Etude, and Holiday. About one-third of these essays concerned string playing and teaching and have recently been collated into a privately printed anthology augmented with photographs from his archives.

In 1973 his amusing, anecdotal autobiography titled Facing the Music was published by David McKay Company, Inc. It was reissued in paperback and published abroad in German. He wrote a second, as-yet unpublished book of memoirs titled Chance Encounters.
