= Paganini Quartet =

American virtuoso string quartet

- Origin: United States
- Genres: Classical
- Years active: 1945–1966
- Past members: Henri Temianka; Robert Maas; Gustave Rosseels; Robert Courte; Charles Libove; Stefan Krayk; Charles Foidart; David Schwartz; Albert Gillis; Adolphe Frezin; Lucien Laporte; Gábor Rejtő; Victor Gottlieb; Edgar Lustgarten

The Paganini Quartet (Henri Temianka, Gustave Rosseels, Charles Foidart, Lucien Laporte) plays the finale of Beethoven's String Quartet No. 4, 1956.

A program from the first concert of the Paganini Quartet at the Library of Congress in 1946. The first three string quartets by Beethoven were performed.

The Paganini Quartet was an American string quartet founded by cellist Robert Maas and violinist Henri Temianka in 1946. The quartet drew its name from the fact that all four of its instruments, made by Antonio Stradivari (1644–1737), had once been owned by the great Italian violinist and composer Niccolo Paganini (1782–1840).

== Origins ==
In 1945, Maas, who had been with the Pro Arte Quartet until early in World War II and was interested in forming a new string quartet, secured a sponsorship from Anna Clark, the widow of copper millionaire William A. Clark. Maas happened upon four Paganini Strads at the shop of Emil Herrmann in New York, and mentioned them to Mrs. Clark, who promptly purchased the instruments for the quartet's use. Meanwhile, another patron of chamber music, Elizabeth Sprague Coolidge, had sponsored violinist Henri Temianka's performance of the Beethoven violin sonata cycle at the Library of Congress in Washington, D.C., with pianist Leonard Shure, and she also expressed interest in the project. Gustave Rosseels, violin, and Robert Courte, viola, immediately accepted invitations to complete the ensemble. As detailed by authors Bill Dedman and Paul Clark Newell, Jr. in Empty Mansions, the story of the Clark family, the quartet often performed and practiced at the Clark home in Santa Barbara, Bellosguardo.

In 1946–47, the four played all the Beethoven string quartets at the Library of Congress; people began lining up at 5:00 a.m. to purchase tickets for the series, which was sold out in an hour. A recording contract with RCA Victor followed, and their rendition of the three Beethoven Opus 59 "Rasumovsky" quartets won the industry award for best recording in 1947.

The Quartet made its home in Los Angeles, California. During rehearsals, they usually spoke French. The story of how the Paganini Quartet came into being is told in Henri Temianka's book Facing the Music.

== Career ==
During its 20-year international career, the Paganini Quartet concertized continuously in large cities and small towns throughout the United States, as well as in famous concert halls around the world. They made joint appearances with Arthur Rubinstein, Andrés Segovia, Claudio Arrau, and Gary Graffman. Their recordings included most of the Beethoven quartets as well as those of Fauré, Verdi, Debussy, Ravel, and others (see Discography, below). They also played the world premieres of works by Darius Milhaud, Mario Castelnuovo-Tedesco, Alberto Ginastera, and Benjamin Lees.

== Members ==
- Henri Temianka was widely known as a concert violinist and conductor, author, and educator. He was the only constant member of the Paganini Quartet throughout its existence.
- Gustave Rosseels was the original second violinist. Later, he was replaced by Charles Libove (who subsequently became first violinist with the Beaux-Arts Quartet), and then Stefan Krayk.
- Robert Courte, who had been a professor of the viola at the Royal Conservatory of Brussels, was the original violist. He was later replaced by Charles Foidart, and then David Schwartz and Albert Gillis, respectively.
- Robert Maas, the quartet's original cellist, died suddenly in 1948. He was replaced by Adolphe Frezin, and later by Lucien Laporte, who had been first cellist for the New York Symphony under Walter Damrosch, and the NBC Symphony. Gábor Rejtő, Victor Gottlieb, and Edgar Lustgarten also filled in at various times.

== Instruments ==
The four Strads were among the most cherished possessions of the famed musician Niccolo Paganini. After their purchase by Mrs. Clark, further adjustments were made to the instruments by the craftsman Simone Fernando Sacconi. The provenance of the instruments is as follows:

- The first violin, the "Comte Cozio di Salabue," was made by Stradivari in 1727 and was played by Paganini himself, after he acquired it from Count Cozio de Salabue in 1817.
- The second violin, the "Desaint," was made by Stradivari in 1680. It is an example of Stradivari's early Amatise style, and is profiled in the book Stradivari's Genius by Toby Faber.
- The viola, the "Mendelssohn," was made in 1731, when Stradivari was 86 years old. It is one of fewer than a dozen surviving Strad violas, and was the instrument that inspired Paganini to commission Hector Berlioz to write his symphonic poem "Harold in Italy".
- The cello is the "Ladenburg" of 1736. It was owned by the Mendelssohn family before coming into Paganini's possession.

When the Paganini Quartet disbanded in 1966, the four Strads reverted to the Corcoran Gallery of Art in Washington, D.C. In accordance with Mrs. Clark's will, they were never to be separated. Beginning in 1992, they were loaned to the Cleveland String Quartet. Since 1994, they have been owned by the Nippon Music Foundation, and were played by the Tokyo String Quartet until the quartet disbanded in 2013. The four instruments were then played by the Hagen Quartet, and then by the Quartetto di Cremona. In 2019, they were loaned to the Kuss Quartet to record the entire cycle of Beethoven Quartets live at Suntory Hall, Tokyo. From the 2019–2020 concert season, the instruments were loaned to the Goldmund Quartett, with the loan renewed for another three years from 2024.

== Repertoire ==
As per the brochure published by F.C Schang 3rd c. 1948, the Quartet's repertoire included the following pieces at that time:

- Ahrendt—Quartet
- Babin—Quartet
- Bach—excerpts from The Art of the Fugue
- Barber—Opus 11
- Bartók—Quartets nos. 1, 2, 6
- Beethoven—Entire cycle of 16 quartets
- Bloch—Quartet no. 2
- Brahms—Opus 51, nos.1, 2; Opus 67
- Britten—Quartet no. 2
- Debussy—Quartet Opus 10 in G minor
- Delerue—Quartet
- Dittersdorf—Quartet in E flat major
- Dvořák—American Quartet Opus 96
- Francaix—Quartet
- Franck—Quartet in D major
- Fuerstner—Divertimento
- Haydn—30 famous quartets
- Hindemith—Quartet no. 3 Opus 22
- Jacobi—Quartet no. 3
- Mendelssohn—Opus 12
- Milhaud—Quartets no. 4, 7 & 15
- Mozart—10 famous quartets
- Piston—Quartet no. 2
- Rathaus—Quartet no. 4
- Ravel—Quartet in F major
- Robertson—American Serenade
- Schubert—Opus 29 in A minor; Quartet no. 14, Opus 125 no. 1 ("Death and the Maiden")
- Schumann—3 Quartets Opus 41
- Shostakovich—Quartet no. 1
- Stravinsky—Concertino, Three Pieces
- Toch—Opus 18
- Verdi—Quartet in e minor
- Vivaldi—L'Estro Armonico (arr. string quartet)

== Reviews ==
- Harold C. Schonberg wrote about the Paganini Quartet's Beethoven recordings in "The Guide to Long-Playing Records: Chamber and Solo Instrument Music" in 1955: "One thing this quartet does have, and that is tone... it never lost its juicy sound. The performances always have taste..."
- Alfred Frankenstein of the San Francisco Chronicle wrote, "Perhaps never before has one heard a string quartet with so rich, mellow and superbly polished a tone."
- In Paris, L'Illustration wrote, "The Paganini Quartet thrilled Paris."

== Discography ==
The Paganini Quartet recorded copiously on 33, 45 and 78 rpm format records, as well as a few reel-to-reel tape releases. A summary of these in-studio recordings includes, by label:

RCA Victor:

- Beethoven Quartets nos. 1, 2, 4, 5, 7, 8, 9, 10, 14, 15 and 16 (these were remastered and reissued on CDs in 2012 by United Archives)
- Debussy Quartet in G minor.
- Fauré Piano Quartet no. 1 (with Artur Rubinstein)
- Selected movements from quartets by Haydn, Mozart, Beethoven, Schubert, Mendelssohn, Schumann, Tchaikovsky, and Dvořák
- Schumann Piano Quintet in E flat (with Artur Rubinstein)
- Verdi Quartet in E minor
- Ravel Quartet in F

For a list of the Paganini Quartet's 78 rpm Victor Musical Masterpiece sets see - http://www.78rpmcommunity.com/indexsearch/blog/paganini-quartet-and-the.html

Concert-Disc:

- Brahms Piano Quintet in F (with Ralph Votapek)

Decca:

- Ginastera Quartet no. 1
- Lajhta Quartet no. 7 op. 49

KAPP:

- Haydn Quartet in C ("Emperor")
- Mozart Quartet in C, K. 465 ("Dissonant")
- Debussy Quartet in g minor
- Ravel Quartet in F

Liberty:

- Britten Quartet no. 1 in D
- Debussy Quartet in G minor
- Lees Quartet no. 1
- Schumann Quartet no. 1 in A minor

Western Recorders (unreleased):

- Bartók Quartet no. 1 op. 7

== Other resources ==
- "The Paganini Quartet" brochure, Atlanta Printing Co., New York, N.Y., c. 1948, by F.C. Schang 3rd.
- Facing the Music, David McKay Company, Inc., New York, 1973, by Henri Temianka.
- "The Birth of a String Quartet", The Violexchange vol. 4 no. 2, p. 39, [? year], by Lucien Kirsch Laporte.
- "Henri Temianka: A Long and Illustrious Musical Career," Journal of the Violin Society of America, Vol. XI no. 1, August 1991, by Albert Mell.
- Stradivari's Genius, Random House, New York, 2004, by Toby Faber.
