= Barbara Buntrock =

German woman violist

Barbara Buntrock (18 February 1982) is a German violist and music educator.

== Life ==
Born in Wuppertal, Buntrock received her first violin lessons at the age of five. From 1991, she was a student of Maria Szabados-Racz at the Bergische Musikschule Wuppertal. She was five times first prize winner of the national Jugend musiziert competition. From 1998 to 2000, Buntrock was a member of the Bundesjugendorchester, most recently as deputy concertmaster. She began her viola studies in 2001 at the Hochschule für Musik und Tanz Köln, Abteilung Wuppertal with Werner Dickel. Beginning in the winter semester 2002/2003, she studied at the Lübeck Academy of Music with Barbara Westphal, where she received her concert diploma in July 2008. Supported by the Gerd Bucerius Scholarship of the Deutsche Stiftung Musikleben, she spent a year abroad (September 2005 to May 2006) at the Juilliard School in New York City with Heidi Castleman. Afterwards, she completed additional studies at the Hochschule für Musik "Hanns Eisler" with Lars Anders Tomter with the aim of obtaining her Konzertexamen. Buntrock was a scholarship holder of the Studienstiftung des deutschen Volkes. She also attended master classes at the Verbier Festival, the International Music Academy of Switzerland and with Walter Levin (LaSalle Quartet), Gábor Takács-Nagy, Lukas Hagen (Hagen Quartet) and Eberhard Feltz.

As a soloist and chamber musician, she performed with the Stuttgarter Kammerorchester, the Sinfonieorchester Wuppertal, the Bergische Symphoniker, the Bochumer Symphoniker and the Philharmonie Südwestfalen.

From February 2009 to December 2010, Buntrock held the position of 1st solo viola of the Leipzig Gewandhaus Orchestra. She plays a viola built around 1650 by Antonio Mariani, which was formerly played by Lionel Tertis. In September 2011, she founded the "Festival 3" as artistic director, a festival for chamber music in the Immanuelskirche in Wuppertal.

Since 2015, Buntrock has been professor for viola at the Robert Schumann Hochschule Düsseldorf.

== Awards ==
- Five times winner of the national Jugend musiziert composition
- 2004: Prize winner of the Theodor-Rogler-Stiftung at the ARD International Music Competition
- 2005: Dr. Glatt special prize at the Geneva International Music Competition
- 2006: Zonta-Musikpreis and a scholarship of the DMW (Deutscher Musikwettbewerb)
- 2007: 1. Prize at the Internationaler Instrumentalwettbewerb Markneukirchen
- 2008: Winner of the Federal President's Scholarship at the Felix Mendelssohn Bartholdy Prize
- 2008: von der Heydt-Kulturpreis der Stadt Wuppertal
- 2008: Special prize for the best interpretation of a work by J.S. Bach at the International Primrose Competition in Arizona
