= Christus Apollo =

Four-movement cantata

Christus Apollo: Cantata Celebrating the Eighth Day of Creation and the Promise of the Ninth is a cantata in four movements for narrator, mezzo-soprano, choir, and orchestra, based on a text by the science fiction author Ray Bradbury and composed by the American composer Jerry Goldsmith. The piece was commissioned by the California Chamber Symphony in 1969, and premiered later that year in Royce Hall at UCLA with the narration performed by Charlton Heston (who had starred in the 1968 film, Planet of the Apes, for which Goldsmith had composed the musical score).

== Style and composition ==
Christus Apollo consists of four movements separated by narration; a complete performance lasts approximately 35 minutes. The musical landscape of the piece blends elements of dodecaphonism and impressionism. In the 2002 Telarc release, Goldsmith commented on the work's inception and composition:

In 1969, the California Chamber Symphony asked me to write a cantata based on a text by the celebrated author Ray Bradbury. I was thrilled to be asked since I had a relationship with Ray going back to dramatic radio of the 1950s and later the motion picture The Illustrated Man. The cantata was to be a large piece—orchestra, choir, mezzo-soprano, and narration. Although the text is quite spiritual, I elected to compose the piece using the 12-tone system. I feel there is a great relationship between impressionism and dodecaphonicism [sic] and that was the language I wanted for Christus Apollo.

== Reception ==
Richard S. Ginell of the Los Angeles Times praised the work, saying, "It's a mystical, ear-enticing souvenir from the year of the first moon landing, with long stretches of narration and no maudlin compromises." Gramophone also lauded the cantata, saying, "It’s an ambitious‚ sincere and supremely wellwrought offering‚ whose progressive harmonic sensibility and imaginative instrumental resource will come as no surprise to anyone familiar with Goldsmith’s genuinely adventurous and striking score from the previous year for Franklin J. Schaffner’s science fiction classic‚ Planet of the Apes."

== Discography ==
A 33.3 RPM vinyl recording was made for the participants of the original 1969 performance. Only 10 known copies exist. A CD version of this recording was released by Tsunami Records, Germany, in 1995.

A recording of Christus Apollo was released February 26, 2002 through Telarc and features Goldsmith's other orchestral works Music for Orchestra and Fireworks: A Celebration of Los Angeles. The recording was conducted by Goldsmith and performed by the mezzo-soprano Eirian James, the London Voices, the London Symphony Orchestra, and narrator Anthony Hopkins.
