= Campaner =

Campaner is a surname. Notable people with the surname include:

- Francis Campaner (born 1946), French cyclist
- Gloria Campaner (born 1986), Italian pianist
