= California Chamber Symphony =

American orchestra

California Chamber Symphony c. 1966

The California Chamber Symphony (CCS) was an orchestra based at Royce Hall, University of California, Los Angeles. It was founded by violinist and conductor Henri Temianka in 1960 and was the first true chamber orchestra in Los Angeles.

== History ==
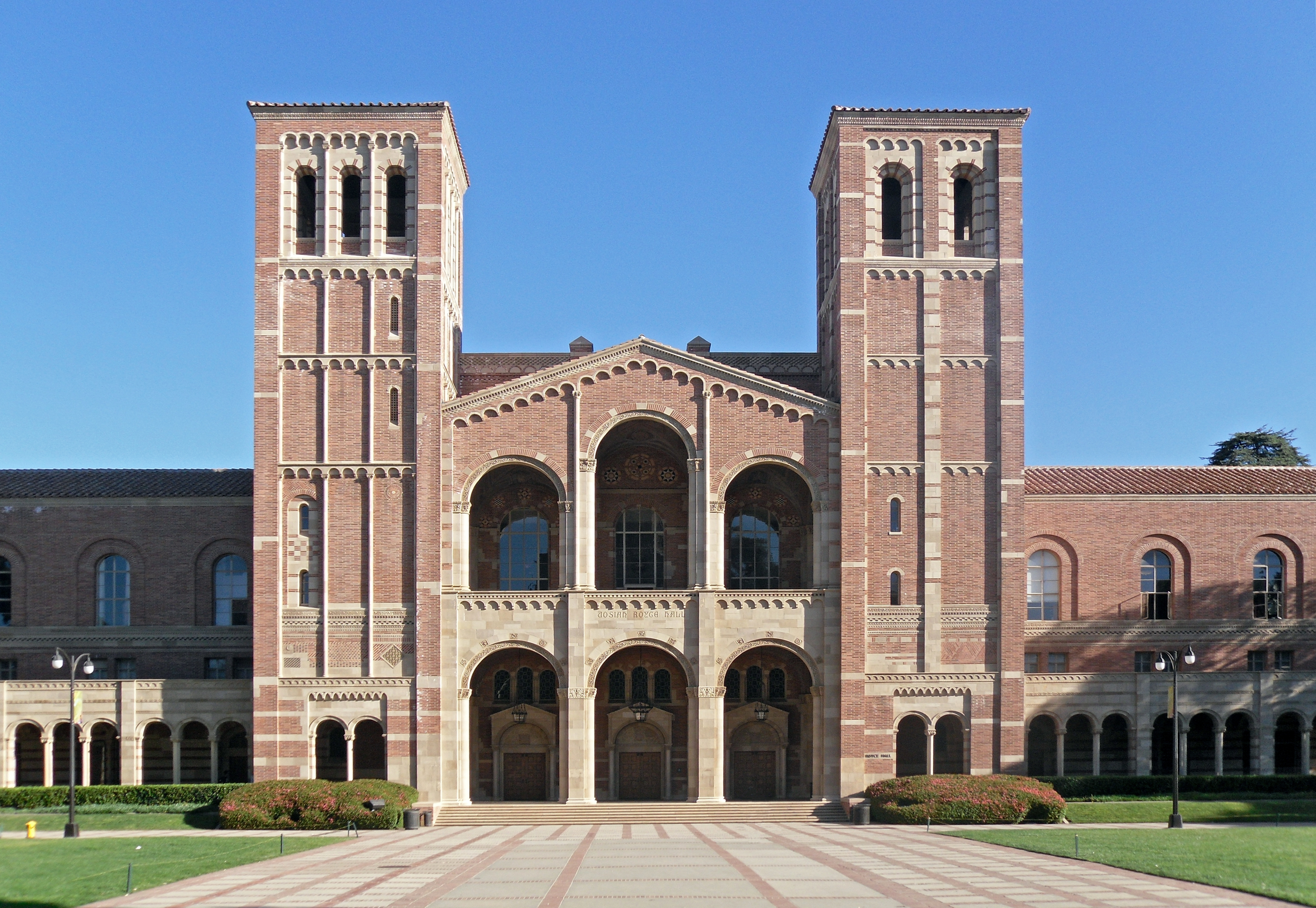
Royce Hall, UCLA, home of the orchestra

In 1958 the noted violinist and conductor Henri Temianka founded the Beverly Hills Concerts for Youth. Works such as ‘’Peter and the Wolf’’ and Saint-Saëns’ ‘’Carnival of the Animals’’ were performed, with celebrity participants including Ray Bradbury, Victor Borge, Hans Conried, Peter Ustinov and Sam Jaffe donating their services as narrators. In Benjamin Britten’s opera ‘’Noye’s Fludde’’, children from the audience participated. The orchestra also gave special concerts at Juvenile Hall and for the disabled.

Initially called “The Temianka Little Symphony,” in 1960 the orchestra became the California Chamber Symphony. It was the first true chamber orchestra in Los Angeles. While based at Royce Hall, UCLA, the group toured the United States and Canada extensively, as well as Hong Kong, and was featured in special television programs on KCET and KNBC.

The orchestra gave over 100 concerts during a span of some three decades. In addition to the baroque and classical literature, the CCS performed major works by such famous modern composers as Aaron Copland, Darius Milhaud, Dmitri Shostakovich, Malcolm Arnold and Carlos Chavez; many of these were West Coast premieres. In 1962 the great violinist David Oistrakh performed the Beethoven, the Brahms and the Bach E Major concertos with the CCS, and as an encore joined Temianka to play the Bach ‘’Double Concerto’’. Other soloists who appeared with the CCS under Temianka’s direction included Jean-Pierre Rampal, Henryk Szeryng, Leonard Pennario and Benny Goodman. Temianka once joined violist William Primrose to perform Mozart’s ‘’Sinfonia Concertante’’, and on another occasion played viola in that piece with Isaac Stern.

Temianka broke with tradition by speaking to his audiences from the stage about the music and composers. At one of the orchestra's first concerts, music critics in the audience walked out. For this reason the concert series was titled “Let’s Talk Music” for some years. He was responsible for the first appearances of many rising musicians such as Christopher Parkening, Jeffrey Kahane, Nathaniel Rosen, Timothy Landauer and Daniel Heifetz, and sponsored the Romero family of four guitarists from Spain (The Romero Guitar Quartet). In later years the California Chamber Virtuosi, an offshoot of the CCS in 1976, gave concerts at the J. Paul Getty museum in Malibu, at Pepperdine University, and at the Taper Forum in Los Angeles. The City and County of Los Angeles repeatedly issued proclamations honoring the CCS. Its last performance was given on Sunday, December 9, 1990. In 2022 a graduating student from Chapman University, Mitchell Tanaka, placed Temianka's pioneering contributions in historical perspective in his production "Temianka Talks Music." .

== Selected concerts ==
Monster Concert 1979

- A "Monster Concert," produced in collaboration with Eugene List, in which 12 Steinway pianos and 36 pianists were brought onstage to perform pieces by Louis M. Gottschalk and others
- Christus Apollo, a cantata written by Jerry Goldsmith, based on a text by Ray Bradbury and narrated by Charlton Heston
- Gian Carlo Menotti's Triple Concerto (with Menotti in the audience)
- Alberto Ginastera's Cantata para America Magica, an extraordinary work based on pre-Columbian Latin American songs and scored for soprano singer and 53 percussion instruments
- the West Coast premiere of Shostakovich's Fourteenth Symphony in 1971
- all six of Bach's Brandenburg Concerti, under the baton of Otto Klemperer, while Temianka played violin, viola and violino piccolo
- a concert in honor of Martin Luther King at which Bill Cosby was emcee
