= Giovanni Paolo Maggini =

Italian luthier (c.1580 - c.1630)

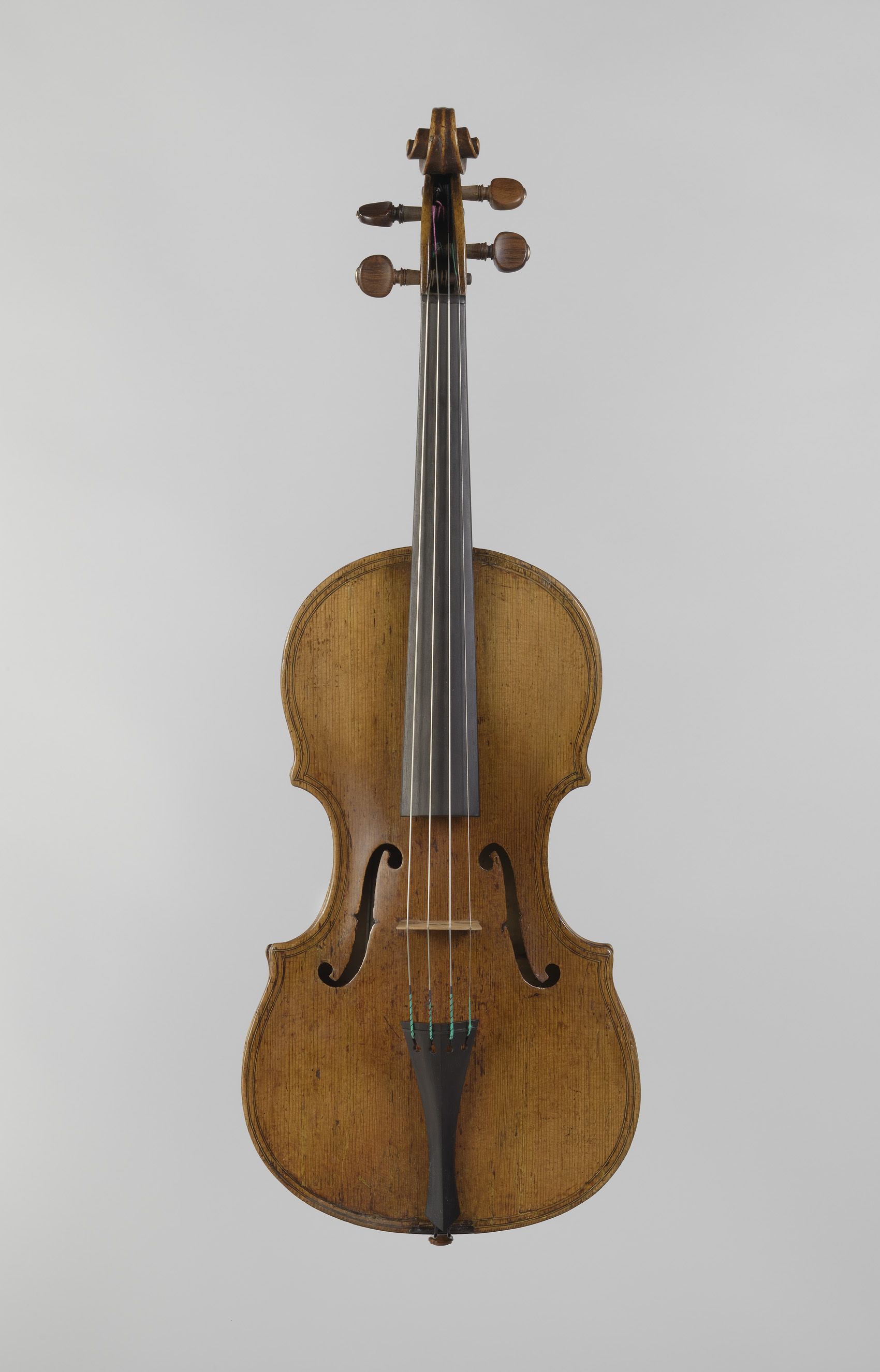
Maggini violin made circe 1610

Giovanni Paolo Maggini (c. 1580 - c. 1630), was a luthier born in Botticino (Brescia), Republic of Venice. Maggini was a pupil of the most important violin maker of the Brescian school, Gasparo da Salò.

Maggini’s early instruments were initially based on the designs of his teacher. Around 1606, Maggini began producing original designs and modifying his technical approach. His violas are noted for their specific tonal characteristics and volume.

The only known pupil of Maggini is Valentino Siani, who worked with him c. 1610–1620, before he moved to Florence and started his own business.

Maggini succumbed to the Italian plague of 1629–31 that also took another important early luthier, Girolamo Amati. This fact arouses suspicions that some of Maggini's later works are perhaps creations from a different maker since tests reveal that some instruments bearing a genuine Maggini label are from trees living after Maggini's death.

The National Music Museum has two Maggini instruments in its collection. One is a bass viola da gamba. The other is a violin.

The 18th-century European violin virtuoso-composer Ivan Mane Jarnović played a Maggini violin.

A genuine Maggini violin ranges in value from $200,000 to $2,000,000.

== Pupils ==
- Antonio Mariani
