= Veronika Hagen =

Austrian violist (born 1963)

Veronika Hagen (born 5 May 1963 in Salzburg) is an Austrian violist.

Born in Salzburg, Hagen began to learn music at the age of six with her father, who was at that time concertmaster of the Mozarteum Orchestra of Salzburg. She then continued her studies at the Musik Hochschule of Salzburg with Helmut Zehetmair and at the Musik Hochschule of Hanover with Hatto Beyerle. During her studies she won several prizes, including the Budapest International Viola Competition in 1984.

Hagen is a founding member of the Hagen Quartet, along with her siblings Lukas, Angelika (later replaced by Rainer Schmidt) and Clemens. The quartet has performed across the world.

Among a number of recordings for the Deutsche Grammophon label, Hagen collaborated with the pianist Paul Gulda on the Brahms Sonatas in 1997 and, with the violinist Augustin Dumay and the Salzburg Camerata, on Mozart's Concertante. As well as her activity as a soloist, she has performed with other leading musicians, including Elena Bashkirova, Joshua Bell, Gérard Caussé, Ivry Gitlis, Paul Gulda, Tatjana Grindenko, Steven Isserlis, Gidon Kremer, Alexander Lonquich and Heinrich Schiff. She has also played at many international music festivals, and has performed with orchestras such as the Tokyo Symphony Orchestra and Orchestre de la Suisse Romande.
