= Lukas Hagen =

Austrian violinist (born 1962)

Lukas Johannes Hagen (born 8 May 1962) is an Austrian violinist and music educator. He is first violinist of the Hagen Quartet.

== Life ==
Born in Salzburg, Hagen is the eldest son of a solo viola player and concertmaster of the Mozarteum Orchestra Salzburg. Like his siblings Clemens, Angelika and Veronika, Lukas was musically encouraged by his father from an early age. He studied violin at the Mozarteum Salzburg with Helmut Zehetmair, graduating with distinction in 1983. After his studies, he received one year of private lessons from Gidon Kremer, and also studied with Nikolaus Harnoncourt and Walter Levin of the LaSalle Quartet. His participation in juries of international competitions and master classes enabled him to work with artists such as Oleg Maisenberg, Heinrich Schiff, András Schiff, and Vladimir Ashkenazy.

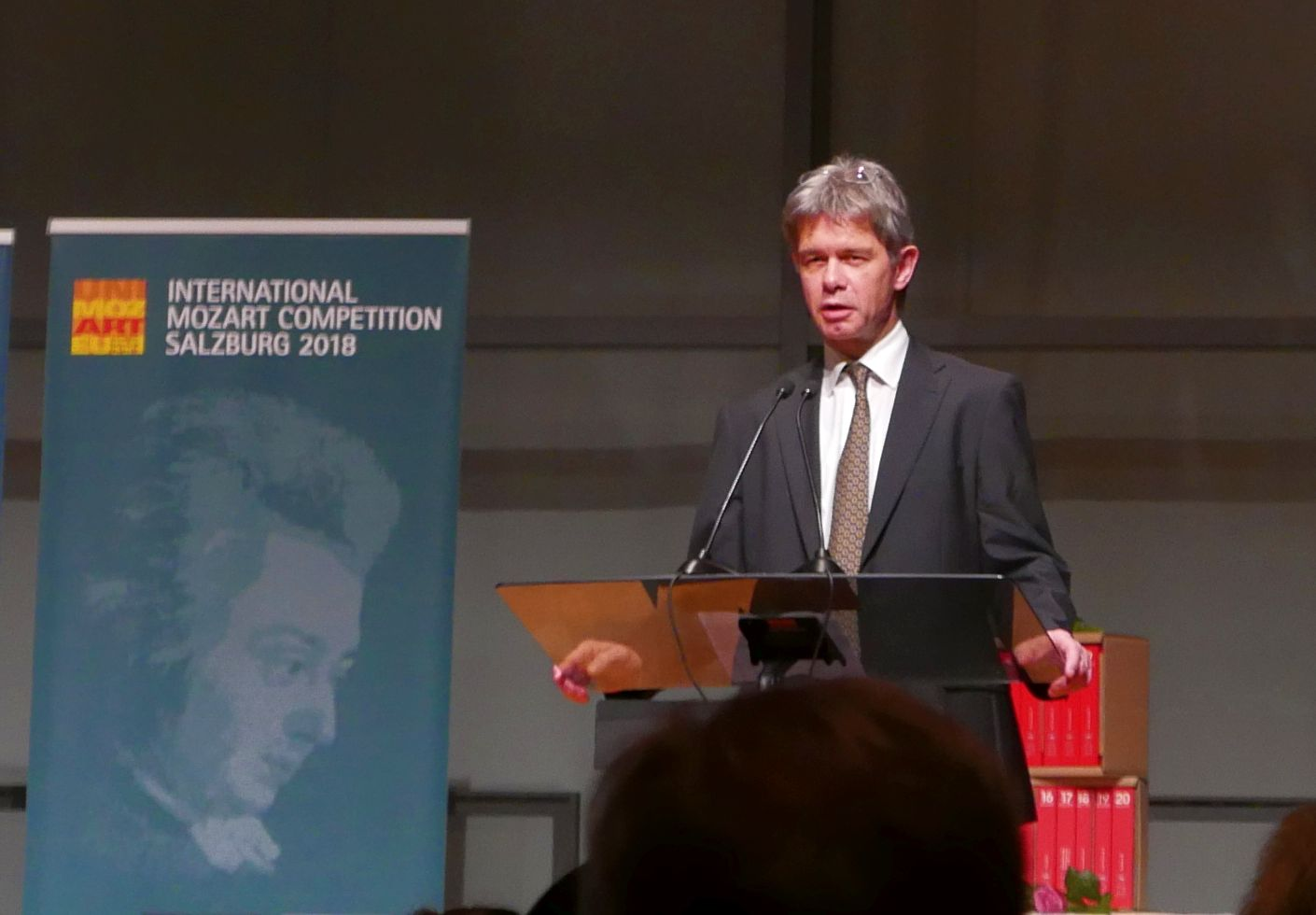
Lukas Hagen at the Laudatio during the award ceremony of the Internationaler Mozartwettbewerb 2018

As a soloist, he performed at the Salzburger Mozartwoche and the Salzburg Festival. His concerts in Amsterdam, Brussels, Paris, the US, Japan, Italy, and Great-Britain made him internationally famous. Hagen was also concertmaster of the Chamber Orchestra of Europe for seven years and is a violinist in the Serapion Ensemble. He is best known for his interpretations of Dmitri Shostakovich and César Franck.

Since 1999, Hagen has been a professor of violin and chamber music at the Mozarteum in Salzburg. From 24 November 2006, he was also Vice-Rector of the university and responsible for the coordination of artistic projects. In February 2018, he took over the chair of the jury at the 13th International Mozart Competition Salzburg in the category String Quartets.

Together with the Hagen Quartet, which he leads as the first violinist, he won several first prizes at international competitions in Portsmouth and Évian. Since 1985, he has also had an exclusive contract with Deutsche Grammophon record label.

Together with his wife Iris, Hagen founded the folk and chamber music festival "Hagen Open Festival" in 2004 in Feistritz am Wechsel near Vienna.

Hagen owns a modern violin from the workshop of Stefan-Peter Greiner. At times, he has played the Stradivari "ex Rewark" from 1724 from the collection of the Oesterreichische Nationalbank. Currently (2018), he plays a Stradivari from 1734.
