= Fireworks: A Celebration of Los Angeles =

Fireworks: A Celebration of Los Angeles is a 1999 orchestral composition by the American composer Jerry Goldsmith. The piece was commissioned by the Los Angeles Philharmonic and premiered August 6, 1999, with Goldsmith conducting the philharmonic at his first performance in the Hollywood Bowl.

== Style and composition ==
Composed in a single movement, Fireworks lasts roughly nine minutes in performance. At the work's premiere, Goldsmith said he composed the music to evoke "the energy, the fun, the casualness" of Los Angeles. In the liner notes of the 2002 Telarc release, he further commented, saying:

After starting to write what was to be a big fireworks extravaganza, I realized that I was writing about the city where I was born and had lived my entire life. I decided instead to make the piece a grand celebration of my childhood, growing years, my years of maturity, and all the events that climaxed with my first appearance at the Hollywood Bowl.

=== Instrumentation ===
Fireworks is scored for three flutes (3rd doubling piccolo), three oboes, three clarinets (3rd doubling bass clarinet), three bassoons (3rd doubling on contrabassoon), four French horns, three trumpets, three trombones, tuba, harp, piano, timpani, percussion, and strings.

== Reception ==
Reviewing the premiere of Fireworks, Jon Burlingame of Variety described the music as "alternately lighthearted and dramatic, dignified and exciting." Gramophone also praised the work, calling it "an unashamedly tuneful crowdpleaser‚ rousingly and effectively scored." Lawrence A. Johnson of the Chicago Classical Review described it as "an energetic curtain-raiser, albeit with a superficial slickness suggestive of the TV and film music genre for which Goldsmith is best known."

Conversely, Richard S. Ginell of the Los Angeles Times called the work "a collection of pompous cinematic cliches" that gave its 2002 CD premiere a "forced, cheery Tinseltown ending."

== Discography ==
A recording of the piece, performed by the London Symphony Orchestra under Goldsmith, was released February 26, 2002, through Telarc and features Goldsmith's other orchestral works Music for Orchestra and Christus Apollo.
