= Nina Bodnar =

American concert violinist

- Born: 1961 (age 64–65)
- Genres: Classical
- Occupation: Concert violinist
- Instrument: Violin

Nina Bodnar (born 1961) is an American concert violinist.

== Early life and education ==
Bodnar studied with Henri Temianka. Bodnar won the 1981 Thibaud International Competition in Paris.

== Career ==
Bodnar served as concertmaster of the Santa Barbara Chamber Orchestra prior to becoming concertmaster of the Saint Louis Symphony under Leonard Slatkin.

Bodnar's playing in the Opera Theater of St. Louis's performances of "Black River" and Leonard Bernstein's "Candide," was favorably reviewed by The New York Times. Her performances with the Rossetti String Quartet and other ensembles were praised by the LA Times.

Bodnar served as artistic director of the Santa Barbara Music and Arts Conservatory. Her Carlo Bergonzi violin inspired at least one of her students to become interested in fine instruments.

== Personal life ==
Bodnar's marriage to French violinist Gilles Apap ended in divorce.
