= Antonio Mariani =

17th-century Italian luthier

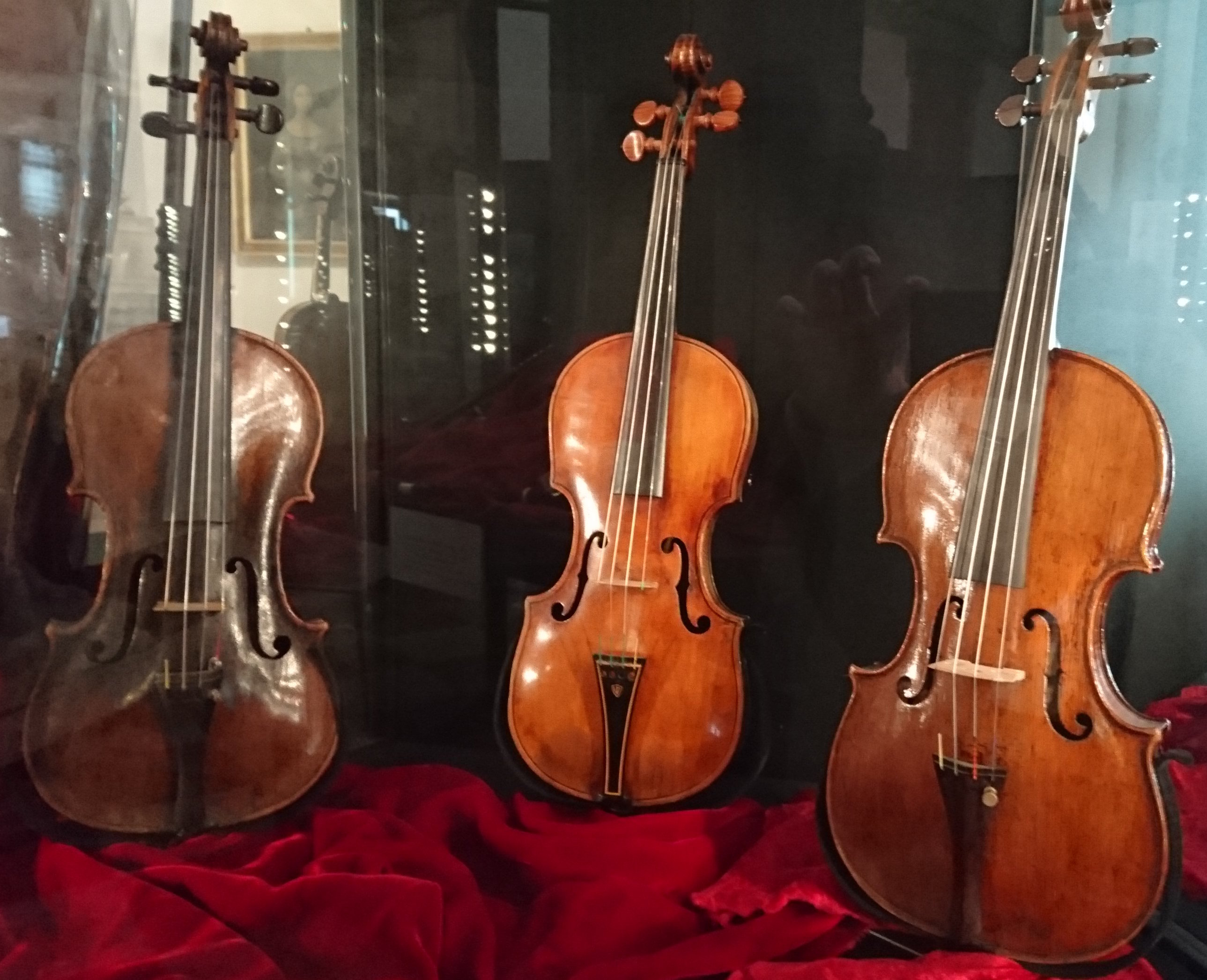
Violin from Antonio Mariani from 1670 (left)

Antonio Mariani was an Italian luthier in the 17th century. He is believed to have studied in Brescia under Giovanni Paolo Maggini, and was later mostly active in Pesaro from 1635 to 1695.

Another maker, Ludovico Mariani, also from Pesaro, is presumed to have been Antonio's son.

A simple design, and plain materials such as pine, are typical for his violins, which are renowned for their excellent tone.

His instruments have amongst others been played by the violists Lionel Tertis and Barbara Buntrock.
