= Music for Orchestra =

Music for Orchestra is a one-movement orchestral composition by the American composer Jerry Goldsmith. The piece was commissioned by Leonard Slatkin and the St. Louis Symphony in 1970 and premiered later that year.

== Style and composition ==
Lasting roughly eight minutes in performance, the dodecaphonic Music for Orchestra is composed in three connected sections developed from the same twelve-tone row: the "turbulent" first section, the "introspective" second section, and a climaxing, "very agitated" third section.

=== Inspiration ===
In the 2002 Telarc release of Music for Orchestra, Goldsmith commented on the work and his motivation for its composition:

In 1970, I was asked by Leonard Slatkin to compose a short piece for the Saint Louis Symphony. While I was thrilled with the commission, the year was not a good one for me. I was going through a divorce and my mother was seriously ill with cancer. All of my personal turmoil – pain, anger, and sorrow – went into writing Music for Orchestra in strict dodecaphonic form. There has been much negative criticism about composing in the 12-tone system, and in today's musical climate, I do think the style is almost anachronistic. But for me thirty years ago, it was a liberating way to express my deepest feelings.

=== Instrumentation ===
Music for Orchestra is scored for piccolo, two flutes, three oboes (3rd doubling English horn), three clarinets (second doubling E-flat clarinet), three bassoons (3rd doubling contrabassoon), four French horns, four trumpets, four trombones, tuba, timpani, percussion (bass drum, bongo drums, chimes, glockenspiel, maracas, snare drum, suspended cymbals, tamtam, tambourine, timbales, triangle, vibraphone, wind machine, wood block, & xylophone), harp, piano (doubling on celesta), and strings (violins I & II, violas, violoncellos, and double basses).

== Reception ==
Mark Swed of the Los Angeles Times described the piece as "an abstract 12-tone work reflecting the academic fashion of the time. Its style is essentially conservative, reminiscent of emotionally roiling Viennese modernism earlier in the century. Goldsmith says in the program notes that he had wanted to make a lot of noise. For eight minutes, he does. Compellingly and with skill." Swed added, "The orchestration is thick but clear, the sound is heavy but not especially dense. Rhythms seem to clench down, to hold you in their grip."

Gramophone similarly lauded Goldsmith for exploring an "uncompromising harmonic idiom" and said the work is "as compact as it is powerfully emotive." Richard S. Ginell of the Los Angeles Times also praised the work, saying, "Written during a time of personal emotional upheaval, Music for Orchestra is a concise, inventive, exuberantly orchestrated canvas of distress."

== Discography ==
A recording of Music for Orchestra, performed by the London Symphony Orchestra under Goldsmith, was released February 26, 2002, through Telarc and features Goldsmith's other orchestral works Christus Apollo and Fireworks: A Celebration of Los Angeles.
