= Rainer Schmidt (violinist) =

German classical violinist

Rainer Schmidt (born 1964) is a German classical violinist.

== Life and career ==
Rainer Schmidt studied at the University of Music, Theatre and Media Hanover, where he graduated with a soloist diploma. He also studied at the College Conservatory of the University of Cincinnati with Walter Levin from the LaSalle Quartet. Since 1987, he has been a member of the Hagen Quartet, where he plays the second violin. In 1989, he founded the Ravinia Trio.

Since 1988, Schmidt has been teaching at the Mozarteum Salzburg and between 2002 and 2007 at the Reina Sofía School of Music in Madrid. Since October 2007, he has held the professorship for violin and chamber music at the Musik-Akademie der Stadt Basel.
