= Leonard Shure =

American concert pianist (1910–1995)

Leonard Shure (April 10, 1910 in Los Angeles – February 28, 1995 in Nantucket, Massachusetts) was an American concert pianist. He began his career as a performer at the age of 5 and as a teenager studied privately with Artur Schnabel in Germany.

== Life ==
Shure graduated from the Hochschule für Musik in Berlin in 1927, at which time he made his debut in Germany. He served as Schnabel's first and only assistant until 1933.

Shure returned to the United States in 1933 and made his first concert appearance in New York City with the Boston Symphony Orchestra, Serge Koussevitzky conducting.

He was a featured soloist with virtually every major symphony orchestra in the United States, including the New York Philharmonic, the Detroit, St. Louis, Pittsburgh Symphony Orchestras, and on numerous occasions, with the Cleveland Orchestra under the direction of George Szell.

In 1941 Shure became the first pianist to perform at the Berkshire Music Festival in Tanglewood, when he appeared there with Koussevitzky and the Boston Symphony Orchestra. In 1946 he performed the complete Beethoven sonata cycle with violinist Henri Temianka at the Library of Congress in Washington D.C. He also performed with such eminent conductors as William Steinberg, Leonard Bernstein and Dimitri Mitropoulos. In 1979 Shure made a successful tour of the Soviet Union.

Shure taught at the Cleveland Institute of Music, the University of Texas, Boston University, and the Mannes School of Music in New York. In the summers of 1966 and 1967, Shure gave the first applied music courses ever offered at Harvard University. He spent two summers at the Rubin Academy in Jerusalem, and four summers in Aspen, Colorado. Late in life, Shure was a member of the faculty at the New England Conservatory of Music. See: List of music students by teacher: R to S#Leonard Shure.

== Discography ==
- "Leonard Shure – Beethoven", 33 Variations on a Waltz by Diabelli CD 72001 AudioFon
- "Leonard Shure – Schubert Piano Sonatas" CD 72010 AudioFon
- "Beethoven – Emperor Concerto; Schumann – Fantasia in C" Leonard Shure (piano), Leon Fleisher (conductor), New England Conservatory Orchestra – The Schnabel Memorial Concert CD 72018 AudioFon
- "Leonard Shure – Beethoven Piano Sonatas" CD 72005 AudioFon
- "Leonard Shure – Brahms, Schubert, Chopin" CD 72016 AudioFon
- "Beethoven 10 Sonatas for Violin & Piano", the 1946 performances with Henri Temianka restored by DOREMI Legendary Treasures DHR-8011-3
