= Jerry Goldsmith =

American film composer (1929–2004)

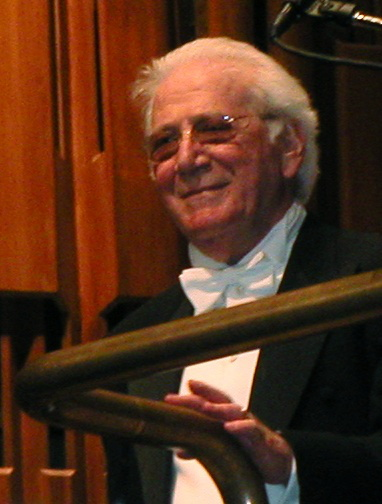
- Goldsmith in 2003

Background information
- Born: Jerrald King Goldsmith; February 10, 1929; Los Angeles, California, U.S.
- Died: July 21, 2004 (aged 75) Beverly Hills, California, U.S.
- Genres: Film score; contemporary classical music
- Occupations: Composer; conductor; orchestrator
- Years active: 1951–2004
- Spouses: Sharon Hennagin (m. 1950; div. 1970); Carol Heather (m. 1972)

Jerrald King Goldsmith (February 10, 1929 – July 21, 2004) was an American composer, conductor and orchestrator with a career in film and television scoring that spanned 49 years and over 200 productions, between 1954 and 2003. He was considered one of film music's most innovative and influential composers. He was nominated for eighteen Academy Awards (winning in 1977 for The Omen), six Grammy Awards, five Primetime Emmy Awards, nine Golden Globe Awards, and four British Academy Film Awards.

He composed scores for five films in the Star Trek franchise, three in The Omen franchise, and three in the Rambo franchise, as well as for films including Planet of the Apes, Patton, Tora! Tora! Tora!, Papillon, Chinatown, Logan's Run, Alien, Poltergeist, The Secret of NIMH, Gremlins, Hoosiers, Total Recall, Sleeping with the Enemy, Medicine Man, Basic Instinct, Rudy, L.A. Confidential, Air Force One, Mulan and The Mummy. He also composed the current fanfare for the Universal Pictures logo, which debuted in The Lost World: Jurassic Park. His scores for the 1960s American television series Thriller, hosted by Boris Karloff, have been pointed out for praise.

He frequently collaborated with directors including Paul Verhoeven, Franklin J. Schaffner, Richard Fleischer, Fred Schepisi, Michael Crichton, Jack Smight, Gordon Douglas, J. Lee Thompson, Paul Wendkos, John Frankenheimer, and Joe Dante.

== Early life and education ==
Goldsmith was born on February 10, 1929, in Los Angeles, California. His parents were Tessa (née Rappaport), a school teacher, and Morris Goldsmith, a structural engineer. His grandparents were Jewish immigrants from Europe. He started playing piano at age six, but only "got serious" by the time he was eleven. At age thirteen, he studied piano privately with concert pianist and educator Jakob Gimpel (whom Goldsmith would later employ to perform piano solos in his score to The Mephisto Waltz) and by the age of sixteen he was studying both theory and counterpoint under Italian composer Mario Castelnuovo-Tedesco, who also tutored such noteworthy composers and musicians as Henry Mancini, Nelson Riddle, Herman Stein, André Previn, Marty Paich, and John Williams.

At age sixteen, Goldsmith saw the 1945 film Spellbound and was inspired by Miklós Rózsa's unconventional score to pursue a career in music. Goldsmith later enrolled and attended the University of Southern California where he was able to attend courses by Rózsa, but dropped out in favor of a more "practical music program" at the Los Angeles City College. There he was able to coach singers, work as an assistant choral director, play piano accompaniment, and work as an assistant conductor.

== Film and television scoring ==
=== 1950s and work at CBS ===
In 1950, Goldsmith found work at CBS as a clerk typist in the network's music department under director Lud Gluskin. There he began writing scores for such radio shows as CBS Radio Workshop, Frontier Gentleman, and Romance. In an interview with Andy Velez from BarnesandNoble.com, Goldsmith recalled: "It was about 1950. CBS had a workshop, and once a week the employees, whatever their talents, whether they were ushers or typists, would produce a radio show. But you had to be an employee. They needed someone to do music, and I knew someone there who said I'd be great for this. I'd just gotten married and needed a job, so they faked a typing test for me. Then I could do these shows. About six months later, the music department heard what I did, liked it, and gave me a job." He later progressed into scoring such live CBS television shows as Climax! and Playhouse 90. He also scored multiple episodes of the television series The Twilight Zone. He remained at CBS until 1960, after which he moved on to Revue Studios and then to Metro-Goldwyn-Mayer for producer Norman Felton, whom he had worked for during live TV and would later compose music for shows produced by MGM Television such as Dr. Kildare and The Man from U.N.C.L.E..

His feature film debut occurred when he composed the music for the western Black Patch (1957). He continued with scores to such films as the western Face of a Fugitive (also 1957), and the science fiction film City of Fear (1959).

=== 1960s ===
Goldsmith began the decade composing for such television shows as Dr. Kildare, Gunsmoke, and Thriller as well as the drama film The Spiral Road (1962). However, he began receiving widespread name recognition only after his intimate score to the western Lonely Are the Brave (1962). His involvement in the picture was the result of a recommendation by composer Alfred Newman who had been impressed with Goldsmith's score on the television show Thriller and took it upon himself to recommend Goldsmith to the head of Universal's music department, despite having never met him. That same year, Goldsmith composed the mostly atonal and dissonant score to the biopic Freud (1962) that depicted a five-year period of the life of psychoanalyst Sigmund Freud. Goldsmith's score led to him gaining his first Academy Award nomination for Best Original Score, though he lost to fellow first-time nominee Maurice Jarre for his music to Lawrence of Arabia (also 1962). Goldsmith composed a score to The Stripper (1963), his first collaboration with director Franklin J. Schaffner for whom Goldsmith would later score the films Planet of the Apes (1968), Patton (1970), Papillon (1973), Islands in the Stream (1977), The Boys from Brazil (1978) and Lionheart (1987).

Following his success with Lonely Are the Brave and Freud, Goldsmith composed the theme music for The Man from U.N.C.L.E. (1964), and scores to such films as the western Rio Conchos, the political thriller Seven Days in May (both also 1964), the romantic drama A Patch of Blue (1965), the war film In Harm's Way (also 1965), the World War I air combat film The Blue Max (1966), the period naval war drama The Sand Pebbles (also 1966), the thriller Warning Shot (1967), the western Hour of the Gun (also 1967), and the mystery The Detective (1968). He almost did not accept the assignment for The Blue Max when he watched the final cut with the producers who had temp-tracked it with Richard Strauss's Also Sprach Zarathustra. He said: "I admit it worked fairly well but my first reaction was to get up and walk away from the job, but I couldn't. Once you've heard music like that with the picture, it makes your own scoring more difficult to arrive at, it clouds your thinking." Goldsmith's scores to A Patch of Blue and The Sand Pebbles garnered him his second and third Academy Award nominations, respectively, and were both one of the 250 nominees for the American Film Institute's top twenty-five American film scores. His scores for Seven Days in May and The Sand Pebbles also garnered Goldsmith his first two respective Golden Globe Award nominations for Best Original Score in 1965 and 1967. During this time, he also composed for many lighter, comedic films such as the family comedy The Trouble with Angels (1966), the James Bond parodies Our Man Flint (1966) and its sequel In Like Flint (1967), and the comedy The Flim-Flam Man (1967).

Goldsmith gained attention for the score of the post-apocalyptic science fiction film Planet of the Apes (1968), which was one of the first to be written entirely in an Avant garde style. When scoring Planet of the Apes, Goldsmith used such innovative techniques as looping drums into an echoplex, using the orchestra to imitate the grunting sounds of apes, having horns blown without mouthpieces, and instructing the woodwind players to finger their keys without using any air. He also used stainless steel mixing bowls, among other objects, to create unique percussive sounds. The score resulted in another Goldsmith nomination for the Best Original Score Oscar and ranks in No. 18 on the American Film Institute's top twenty-five American film scores. Though he did not return to compose for its sequel Beneath the Planet of the Apes (1970), Goldsmith scored the third installment in the Planet of the Apes franchise, Escape from the Planet of the Apes (1971).

Goldsmith concluded the decade with scores to such films as the western Bandolero! (1968), the spy thriller The Chairman, the science fiction film The Illustrated Man, and the western 100 Rifles (all 1969). He composed the theme for the comedy-drama television series Room 222 which debuted in 1969.

=== 1970s ===
Throughout the score for the World War II biographical film Patton (1970), Goldsmith used an echoplex to loop recorded sounds of "call to war" triplets played on the trumpet that musically represented General George S. Patton's belief in reincarnation. The main theme also consisted of a symphonic march accompanied by a pipe organ to represent the protagonist's militaristic and deeply religious nature. The film's music subsequently earned Goldsmith an Oscar nomination for Best Original Score and was one of the American Film Institute's 250 nominees for the top twenty-five American film scores. Goldsmith's critical success continued with his emotional score to the prison escape film Papillon (1973), which also earned him an Academy Award nomination. In the early 1970s, Goldsmith also wrote the themes for two wildly different TV series, Barnaby Jones and The Waltons.

Goldsmith was faced with the daunting task of replacing a score by composer Phillip Lambro to the neo-film noir Chinatown (1974). With only ten days to compose and record an entirely new score, Goldsmith quickly produced a score that mixed an eastern music sound with elements of jazz in an ensemble that only featured a trumpet, four pianos, four harps, two percussionists, and a string section. Goldsmith received an Academy Award nomination for his efforts though he lost to Nino Rota and Carmine Coppola for The Godfather Part II. The score to Chinatown ranks No. 9 on the AFI's list of top 25 American film scores. It was also nominated for a Golden Globe Award for Best Original Score.

Goldsmith earned further critical praise with his score to the period adventure film The Wind and the Lion (1975), which relied upon a diverse ensemble including many Moroccan instruments and a large percussion section. The score garnered Goldsmith an Oscar nomination for Best Original Score, though he lost to John Williams for his score to Jaws. The Wind and the Lion was also one of the AFI's 250 nominees for the top twenty-five American film scores.

Goldsmith composed a dark choral score to the horror film The Omen (1976), which was the first film score to feature the use of a choir in an avant-garde style. The score was successful among critics and garnered Goldsmith his only Academy Award for Best Original Score and a nomination for Best Original Song for "Ave Satani". His wife, Carol Heather Goldsmith, also wrote lyrics and performed a vocal track titled "The Piper Dreams" released solely on the soundtrack album. Goldsmith would go on to compose for two more entries in the franchise; Damien - Omen II (1978) and Omen III: The Final Conflict (1981).

He continued to have critical success with scores to such films as the dystopian science fiction Logan's Run (1976), the period drama Islands in the Stream (1977, a score which remained one of his own favorites), the science fiction suspense Coma (1978), the science fiction thriller Capricorn One (1977), the disaster film The Swarm (1978), the period comedy The Great Train Robbery (also 1978), and his Academy Award-nominated score to the science fiction thriller The Boys from Brazil (1978), in which he utilized lively waltzes juxtaposed against the film's concept of cloning Adolf Hitler.

Goldsmith composed a score to the science fiction film Alien (1979). His score featured an orchestra augmented by an Indian conch horn, didgeridoo, steel drum, and serpent (a 16th-century instrument), while creating further "alien" sounds by delaying string pizzicati through an echoplex. Many of the instruments were used in such atypical ways they were virtually unidentifiable. His score was, however, heavily edited during post-production and Goldsmith was required to rewrite music for several scenes. In the final score several pieces were moved, replaced, or cut. Director Ridley Scott and editor Terry Rawlings also, without Goldsmith's consent, purchased the rights to the "Main Title" from Freud (1962) which they used during the acid blood sequence. Despite the heavy edits and rewrites, Goldsmith's score for the film earned him a Golden Globe Award nomination for Best Original Score and was one of the AFI's 250 nominees for the top twenty-five American film scores.

Goldsmith concluded the decade composing the score for Star Trek: The Motion Picture (1979). Having been Gene Roddenberry's initial choice to compose the original Star Trek pilot "The Cage" yet being unable to do so due to scheduling conflicts, Goldsmith was the first pick of both Paramount Pictures and director Robert Wise to compose a score for The Motion Picture. Faced with composing a new Star Trek theme for the film, Goldsmith initially struggled for inspiration, and proceeded to compose as much of the score as possible before the need to develop the main title theme. His initial score for the scene in which the newly refitted Starship Enterprise is revealed to the audience was not well received by the filmmakers, director Robert Wise feeling that it lacked a strong thematic hook and evoked sailing ships. Though somewhat irked by its rejection, Goldsmith consented to re-work his initial idea and finally arrived at the Star Trek theme which was ultimately used. The film's soundtrack also provided a debut for the Blaster Beam, an electronic instrument 12 to 15 feet (3.7 to 4.6 m) long, created by musician Craig Huxley. The Blaster had steel wires connected to amplifiers fitted to the main piece of aluminum; the device was played with an artillery shell. Goldsmith heard it and immediately decided to use it for V'Ger's cues. An enormous pipe organ first plays the V'Ger theme on the Enterprise's approach, a literal indication of the machine's power. His score for The Motion Picture earned him Academy Award and Golden Globe Award nominations, and was one of the AFI's 250 nominees for the top twenty-five American film scores. Goldsmith would later compose the scores for Star Trek V: The Final Frontier (1989) (which included a revised arrangement of the theme from The Motion Picture), Star Trek: First Contact (1996), Star Trek: Insurrection (1998), and Star Trek: Nemesis (2002), as well as the theme to the television series Star Trek: Voyager in 1995. In addition, his theme for The Motion Picture, as arranged by Dennis McCarthy, was reused as the theme for Star Trek: The Next Generation in 1987.

=== 1980s ===
Throughout the 1980s, Goldsmith found himself increasingly scoring science fiction and fantasy films in the persistent wake of Star Wars (1977), composing for such films as The Omen sequels Damien: Omen II (1978) and Omen III: The Final Conflict (1981), space western Outland (1981), animated fantasy The Secret of NIMH (1982), and the film adaptation of The Twilight Zone, which he composed in four different styles to accompany the film's four stories.

Goldsmith was hired to compose the music to the Tobe Hooper-directed horror film Poltergeist (1982). He wrote several themes for the film including a gentle lullaby for the protagonist Carol Anne and her family's suburban life, a semi-religious theme for scenes concerning the souls trapped between the two worlds, and bombastic atonal bursts during scenes of horror. The film's score garnered him an Oscar nomination, though he lost again to John Williams for Spielberg's E.T. the Extra-Terrestrial.

He did, however, still manage to compose for such non-fantasy productions as the period television miniseries Masada (1981) winning an Emmy Award, the war film Inchon (1982), the action adventure First Blood (also 1982), and his Oscar- and Golden Globe Award-nominated score to political drama Under Fire (1983) in which he used the sound of a South American pan flute, synthetic elements, and the prominently featured solo work of jazz guitarist Pat Metheny.

Throughout the decade, many of his compositions became increasingly laced with synthetic elements such as his scores for the horror sequel Psycho II (1983), the comedy horror film Gremlins (1984, winning a Saturn Award for Best Music), the fantasy superhero adaptation Supergirl (1984), Ridley Scott fantasy Legend (1985, initially heard only in European prints and then years later in a 2002 director's cut), action sequel Rambo: First Blood Part II (1985), family fantasy Baby: Secret of the Lost Legend (also 1985), and horror movie sequel Poltergeist II (1986), a more synthetic score than the original and the first of two sequels. He garnered another Oscar nomination for his innovative, critically acclaimed score to sports drama Hoosiers (1986), though he lost to Herbie Hancock for Round Midnight. The score incorporates synthesizers, orchestra, and the recorded sounds of basketball hits on a gymnasium floor.

During the same period, Goldsmith scored the Michael Crichton film Runaway (1984), the composer's first all-electronic score. In an interview with Keyboard magazine in 1984, Goldsmith said that in order to simulate the ambiance of a real orchestra, several speakers were set up in an actual orchestra hall similar to how they would be arranged if they were live players. The playback was re-recorded to capture the feel of the hall.

Goldsmith finished out the decade with noteworthy scores to such films as the science-fiction fantasy family film Explorers (1985), medieval adventure Lionheart, science fiction comedy Innerspace (both 1987), action film Rambo III (1988), the science fiction horror Leviathan, and Star Trek V: The Final Frontier (both 1989), his second Star Trek film score. Goldsmith's score to Leviathan incorporated the use of recorded whale sounds during the main titles. His comedy score to The 'Burbs (1989) made use of pipe organ, recorded dog barking sound effects, and for parodying the trumpet "call to war" triplets on an echoplex from his previous score to Patton (1970).

=== 1990s ===
Receiving critical acclaim for his music for the romantic drama The Russia House (1990), Goldsmith's score featured a unique mixture of Russian music and jazz to complement the nationalities and characteristics of the two main characters. He also composed critically acclaimed music for the science fiction action film Total Recall (also 1990), which Goldsmith later regarded as one of his best scores. Other scores of the era include Gremlins 2: The New Batch (also 1990, a film in which Goldsmith also made a brief cameo appearance), the psychological thriller Sleeping with the Enemy (1991), the family comedy Mom and Dad Save the World, the fantasy romance Forever Young (both 1992), the thriller The Vanishing, and the family comedy Dennis the Menace (both 1993). Goldsmith also composed a critically acclaimed score for the medical drama Medicine Man (1992). In concert, Goldsmith would later recount a story of how actor Sean Connery copied Goldsmith's signature ponytail hairstyle for his character Robert Campbell in the film. Goldsmith also composed the musical score to The Edge starring Sir Anthony Hopkins in 1997.

Goldsmith composed and conducted a score to the erotic thriller Basic Instinct (1992). The soundtrack, an unsettling hybrid of orchestral and electronic elements, garnered him another Oscar nomination as well as a Golden Globe Award nomination and was later regarded by the composer as one of his most challenging works. He wrote an acclaimed score for the classic sports film Rudy (1993), which has since been used in the trailers for numerous films including Angels in the Outfield (1994), Good Will Hunting (1997), Spirit: Stallion of the Cimarron (2002), and Seabiscuit (2003). It was also heard on the TV spot of "The Little Vampire" (2000) and an Arnold Schwarzenegger fitness commercial.

Opening theme
Star Trek: Voyager theme composed by Goldsmith.

Goldsmith composed acclaimed scores for such films as the superhero adaptation The Shadow, the thriller The River Wild, the romantic comedy I.Q. (all 1994), the science fiction drama Powder, the action film Congo, the fantasy adventure First Knight (all 1995), the action film Executive Decision, and his third Star Trek film installment Star Trek: First Contact (both 1996) which he composed with his son Joel Goldsmith. Goldsmith also composed the theme for the UPN series Star Trek: Voyager (which debuted in 1995) for which he won a Primetime Emmy Award for Outstanding Main Title Theme Music. In 2020, Newsweek magazine said that the Voyager theme was the best of all Star Trek television series' theme songs.

Goldsmith composed the critically successful score to the horror action film The Ghost and the Darkness (1996) which featured a traditional Irish folk melody interwoven with African rhythms. He was hired to replace a score by Randy Newman for Air Force One (1997). Goldsmith, with the assistance of composer Joel McNeely, completed the brassy, heroic score in only twelve days. Goldsmith also composed a percussive, jazzy score for the critically acclaimed crime drama L.A. Confidential (also 1997). His score garnered him Oscar and Golden Globe Award nominations, and was also one of the AFI's 250 nominees for the top twenty-five American film scores.

Goldsmith composed from 1997 to 2012 fanfare for the Universal Pictures opening logo, first heard in The Lost World: Jurassic Park (1997) and the short version for the Universal Television closing logo, first heard on The Tom Show. The studio continues to use this theme, with a new arrangement of it scored by Brian Tyler to accompany the studio's current opening logo, introduced with The Lorax (2012) to coincide with the celebration of the studio's 100th anniversary. Goldsmith also continued with scores for such films as the 1997 survival drama The Edge (also 1997), his fourth Star Trek film installment, Star Trek: Insurrection (1998), the science fiction horror Deep Rising, the action thriller U.S. Marshals and the science fiction film Small Soldiers (all also 1998). He also composed a score of combined Eastern, orchestral, and synthetic elements for the Disney-animated film Mulan (also 1998), which subsequently earned him his final Oscar and Golden Globe Award nominations along with songwriter Matthew Wilder and lyricist David Zippel.

Goldsmith concluded the decade with critically successful scores to such popular films as action adventure horror The Mummy, the horror film The Haunting, and the action adventure The 13th Warrior (1999). In 1999, he also composed "Fanfare for Oscar" for the Academy of Motion Picture Arts and Sciences.

=== 2000s and final scores ===
During the early years of the 2000s, Goldsmith composed scores to the science fiction thriller Hollow Man (2000), the mystery film Along Came a Spider, the drama The Last Castle (both 2001), the action/political thriller The Sum of All Fears, and his last Star Trek film Star Trek: Nemesis (both 2002). Goldsmith had composed the scores to five of the first ten Star Trek movies up to that point. Goldsmith also composed an original score to the simulator attraction Soarin' Over California which debuted February 8, 2001 at the Disneyland Resort, and the same attraction Soarin' which opened May 5, 2005 in Epcot at the Walt Disney World Resort. It was later said that when Goldsmith first rode the ride, he left in tears and said, "I'd do anything to be part of this project. I'd even score the film for free."

Goldsmith's final cinematic score, composed during declining health, was the critically acclaimed music for the live-action/animated hybrid film Looney Tunes: Back in Action (2003), directed by long-time Goldsmith collaborator Joe Dante. One of his last works was with another long-time collaborator, Richard Donner (for whom Goldsmith had scored The Omen in 1976), on the science fiction film Timeline (also 2003). However, due to a complicated post-production process, Goldsmith's score had to be replaced. Goldsmith's score was used for the preliminary cuts, but the score didn't fit the later cuts of the film and had to be re-scored. Goldsmith's unavailability led to composer Brian Tyler taking over. Goldsmith's unused score was later released on CD, September 7, 2004, through Varèse Sarabande, less than two months after his death in July. The album quickly became out of print.

=== Studio fanfares ===
Goldsmith composed the fanfares accompanying the production logos for multiple major film studios. He composed the 1976 fanfare for Paramount Pictures, which was used mainly for its home video label, as well as the 1988 Carolco Pictures fanfare and the Cinergi Pictures fanfare, with Bruce Broughton conducting the Sinfonia of London's performance of it.

With the release of The Lost World: Jurassic Park, his 1997 opening fanfare for Universal Pictures debuted. His work on the fanfare would later be re-composed by John Williams for the 20th anniversary of E.T. the Extra-Terrestrial, a film in which Williams composed the film's score, with a customized fanfare, merging the Universal fanfare and the film's main theme, and the full Universal fanfare, only used in The Scorpion King; and composed and arranged by Brian Tyler for the studio's 100th anniversary.

== Concert works ==
- Toccata for Solo Guitar
  In the 1950s, Goldsmith composed "Toccata for Solo Guitar". The music was later performed and recorded by Gregg Nestor and released through BSX Records January 5, 2010.
- The Thunder of Imperial Names
  In 1957, Goldsmith composed the patriotic piece based on a text by Thomas Wolfe titled The Thunder of Imperial Names for concert band and narration, which first appeared on the CBS Radio Workshop episode "1489 Words". "The Thunder of Imperial Names" was later performed and re-recorded in 2006 by the U.S. Air Force Tactical Command Band under conductor Lowell E. Graham and narrated by Gary McKenzie.
- Christus Apollo
  In 1969, the California Chamber Symphony commissioned Goldsmith to compose a cantata based on the text "Christus Apollo" by science fiction author Ray Bradbury, with whom Goldsmith had previously worked on dramatic radio and later the 1969 film The Illustrated Man. The piece, written in four movements, consisted of orchestra, choir, mezzo-soprano solo, and narration (originally performed by Charlton Heston). Goldsmith composed the piece largely using the 12-tone system, later stating, "I feel there is a great relationship between impressionism and dodecaphonicism and that was the musical language I wanted for 'Christus Apollo'." For the 2002 Telarc album release, Christus Apollo was performed by the London Symphony Orchestra, the London Voices, mezzo-soprano Eirian James, and narrated by actor Anthony Hopkins.
- Music for Orchestra
  In 1970, Goldsmith was approached by conductor Leonard Slatkin to compose a short piece for the Saint Louis Symphony Orchestra. The atonal composition was written in three sections developed from one common 12-tone row including the "turbulent" first section, the "introspective" second section, and climaxing in a "very agitated" third section. Goldsmith later reflected that the piece was a result of much turbulence in his life, stating, "I was going through a divorce and my mother was seriously ill with cancer." Goldsmith continued, "All of my personal turmoil – pain, anger, and sorrow – went into writing 'Music for Orchestra' in strict dodecaphonic form."
- Fireworks: A Celebration of Los Angeles
  In 1999, Goldsmith composed the energetic Fireworks: A Celebration of Los Angeles to conclude his first concert series with the Los Angeles Philharmonic at the Hollywood Bowl. Looking back on the experience, Goldsmith later said, "After starting to write what was to be a big fireworks extravaganza, I realized that I was writing about the city where I was born and had lived my entire life. I decided instead to make the piece a grand celebration of my childhood, growing years, my years of maturity, and all the events that climaxed with my first appearance at the Hollywood Bowl."

== Personal life ==
Goldsmith was married twice. He was first married to Sharon Hennagin in 1950; they divorced in 1970. He married Carol Heather Sheinkopf in 1972, and the couple remained together until his death in 2004. His oldest son Joel Goldsmith (1957–2012) was also a composer and collaborated with his father on the score for Star Trek: First Contact, composing approximately twenty-two minutes of the score. Goldsmith also conducted Joel's theme for The Untouchables and composed the theme for the pilot Hollister, scored by Joel. Goldsmith's daughter, Carrie Goldsmith, went to high school with Titanic film score composer James Horner, who also composed music for Star Trek's second and third films: Star Trek II: The Wrath of Khan and Star Trek III: The Search for Spock. Carrie Goldsmith was working on a biography of her father, though the book has been suspended indefinitely for unspecified reasons. Ellen Smith, who sang the title song for Wild Rovers, shortened her surname but was actually his daughter, Ellen Goldsmith.

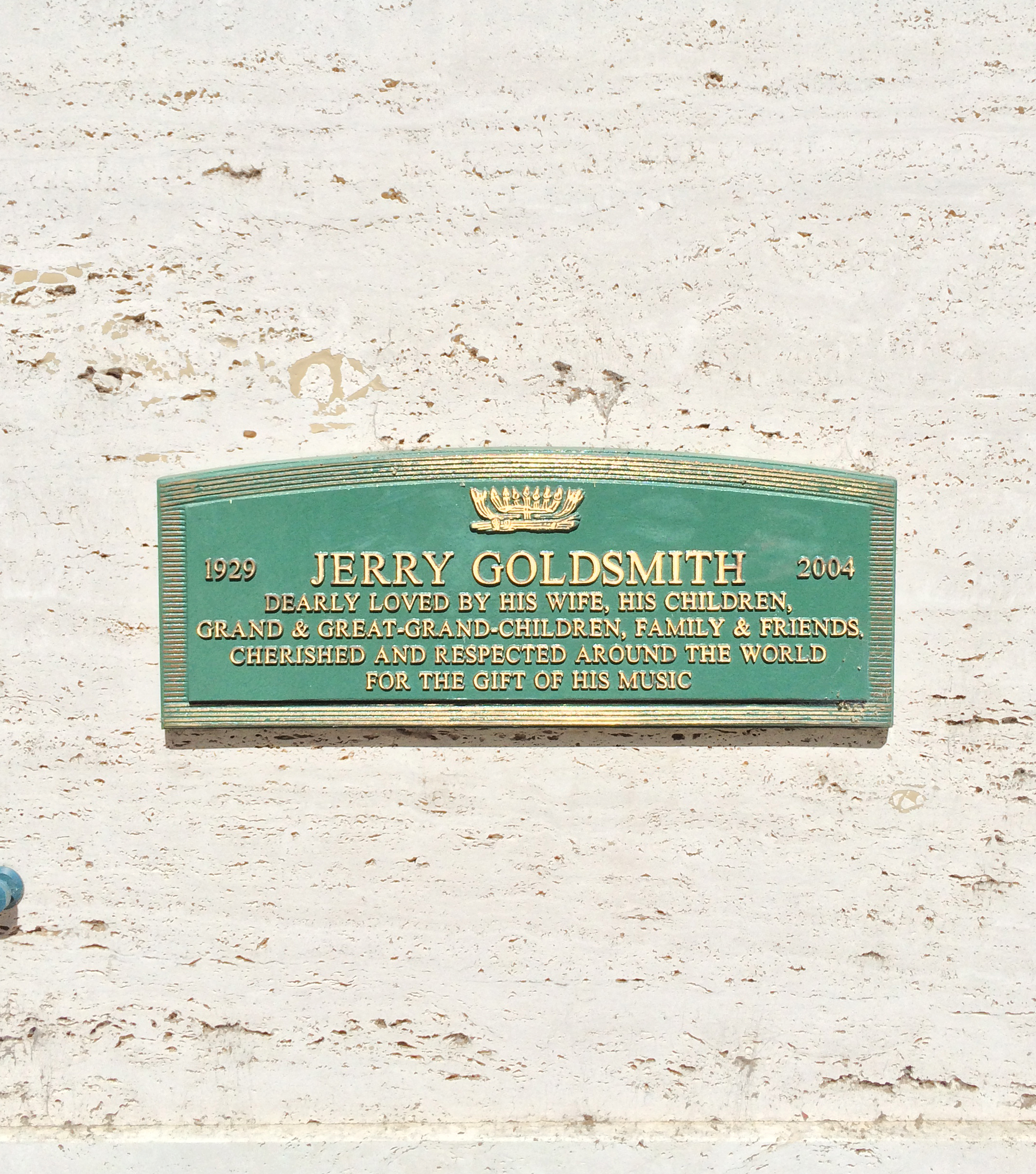
Crypt of Jerry Goldsmith at Hillside Memorial Park

== Death ==
Goldsmith died from colon cancer at his home in Beverly Hills, California, on July 21, 2004, at the age of 75. He was interred at Hillside Memorial Park Cemetery.

== Style and influences ==
Goldsmith was greatly influenced by movements of early 20th-century classical music, notably modernism, Americana, impressionism, dodecaphonism, and early film scores. He has cited Igor Stravinsky, Aaron Copland, Miklós Rózsa, Bernard Herrmann, Béla Bartók, and Alban Berg, among others, as some of the main influences to his style of composition.

He is known for his unique instrumentation and often utilizes ethnic instruments, recorded sounds, synthetic textures, and the traditional orchestra concurrently. When asked about his inclination for embracing new techniques and constantly shifting musical palette, Goldsmith said, "It seems like it's me, and that's that! Certain composers are doing the same thing over and over again, which I feel is sort of uninteresting. I don't find that you grow very much in that way. I like to keep changing, trying to do new things. Basically, I'm saying the same thing with a little different twist on it. Once you get caught up in the creative process, something inside takes over, and your subconscious just does it for you."

== Legacy ==
Jerry Goldsmith has been considered one of film music history's most innovative and influential composers. While presenting Goldsmith with a Career Achievement Award from the Society for the Preservation of Film Music in 1993, fellow composer Henry Mancini said of Goldsmith, "he has instilled two things in his colleagues in this town. One thing he does, he keeps us honest. And the second one is he scares the hell out of us." In his review of the 1999 re-issue of the Star Trek: The Motion Picture soundtrack, Bruce Eder highly praised Goldsmith's ability, stating, "one of the new tracks, 'Spock's Arrival', may be the closest that Goldsmith has ever come to writing serious music in a pure Romantic idiom; this could have been the work of Rimsky-Korsakov or Stravinsky — it's that good." In a 2001 interview, film composer Marco Beltrami (3:10 to Yuma, The Hurt Locker) stated, "Without Jerry, film music would probably be in a different place than it is now. I think he more than any other composer bridged the gap between the old Hollywood scoring style and the modern film composer."

In 2006, upon composing The Omen (a remake of the Goldsmith-scored 1976 film), Marco Beltrami dedicated his score to Goldsmith, which also included an updated arrangement of "Ave Satani" titled "Omen 76/06". Likewise, when composer Brian Tyler was commissioned in 2012 to update the Universal Studios logo for the Universal centennial, he retained the melody originally composed by Goldsmith in 1997, opting to "bring it into the 21st century."

== Awards and nominations ==
Over the course of his career, Goldsmith received 18 total Academy Award nominations, making him one of the most nominated composers in the history of the Awards. Despite this, Goldsmith won only one Oscar, his score for The Omen (1976). This makes Goldsmith the most nominated composer to have won an Oscar only on one occasion. In 1991, Goldsmith received an Honorary Doctorate of Music from Berklee College of Music.

On May 9, 2017, Goldsmith posthumously received a star on the Hollywood Walk of Fame for his achievements in the music industry, located at 6752 Hollywood Boulevard.

=== AFI ===
The American Film Institute respectively ranked Goldsmith's scores for Chinatown (1974) and Planet of the Apes (1968) No. 9 and No. 18 on their list of the 25 greatest film scores. He is one of only five composers to have more than one score featured in the list, including Elmer Bernstein, Bernard Herrmann, Max Steiner, and John Williams. His scores for the following films were also nominated for inclusion:

- Alien (1979)
- L.A. Confidential (1997)
- The Omen (1976)
- Papillon (1973)
- A Patch of Blue (1965)
- Patton (1970)
- The Sand Pebbles (1966)
- Star Trek: The Motion Picture (1979)
- The Wind and the Lion (1975)

=== Accolades ===
Award	Year	Project	Category	Outcome
Academy Awards	1963	Freud	Best Music Score—substantially original	Nominated
Academy Awards	1966	A Patch of Blue	Best Music Score—substantially original	Nominated
Academy Awards	1967	The Sand Pebbles	Best Original Music Score	Nominated
Academy Awards	1969	Planet of the Apes	Best Original Score—for a motion picture [not a musical]	Nominated
Academy Awards	1971	Patton	Best Original Dramatic Score	Nominated
Academy Awards	1974	Papillon	Best Original Dramatic Score	Nominated
Academy Awards	1975	Chinatown	Best Original Score	Nominated
Academy Awards	1976	The Wind and the Lion	Best Original Score	Nominated
Academy Awards	1977	The Omen	Best Original Score	Won
Academy Awards	1977	"Ave Satani" (from The Omen)	Best Original Song	Nominated
Academy Awards	1979	The Boys from Brazil	Best Original Score	Nominated
Academy Awards	1980	Star Trek: The Motion Picture	Best Original Score	Nominated
Academy Awards	1983	Poltergeist	Best Original Score	Nominated
Academy Awards	1984	Under Fire	Best Original Score	Nominated
Academy Awards	1987	Hoosiers	Best Original Score	Nominated
Academy Awards	1993	Basic Instinct	Best Original Score	Nominated
Academy Awards	1998	L.A. Confidential	Best Original Dramatic Score	Nominated
Academy Awards	1999	Mulan (shared nomination with Matthew Wilder and David Zippel)	Best Original Musical or Comedy Score	Nominated
Annie Awards	1998	Mulan (shared with Matthew Wilder and David Zippel)	Music in a Feature Production	Won
British Academy Film Awards	1974	Chinatown	Best Film Music	Nominated
British Academy Film Awards	1975	The Wind and the Lion	Best Film Music	Nominated
British Academy Film Awards	1979	Alien	Best Film Music	Nominated
British Academy Film Awards	1997	L.A. Confidential	Best Film Music	Nominated
Emmy Awards	1961	Thriller (shared nomination with Pete Rugolo)	Outstanding Achievement in the Field of Music for Television	Nominated
Emmy Awards	1966	The Man From U.N.C.L.E.	Outstanding Music - Composition	Nominated
Emmy Awards	1973	The Red Pony	Outstanding Music Composition	Won
Emmy Awards	1975	QB VII: Parts I and II (ABC Movie Special)	Outstanding Music Composition for a Special	Won
Emmy Awards	1976	Babe	Outstanding Music Composition for a Special	Won
Emmy Awards	1981	Masada: Part 2	Outstanding Music Composition for a Limited Series or a Special (dramatic underscore)	Won
Emmy Awards	1995	Star Trek: Voyager	Outstanding Main Title Theme Music	Won
Golden Globe Awards	1965	Seven Days in May	Best Original Score	Nominated
Golden Globe Awards	1967	The Sand Pebbles	Best Original Score	Nominated
Golden Globe Awards	1975	Chinatown	Best Original Score	Nominated
Golden Globe Awards	1980	Alien	Best Original Score	Nominated
Golden Globe Awards	1980	Star Trek: The Motion Picture	Best Original Score	Nominated
Golden Globe Awards	1984	Under Fire	Best Original Score	Nominated
Golden Globe Awards	1993	Basic Instinct	Best Original Score	Nominated
Golden Globe Awards	1998	L.A. Confidential	Best Original Score	Nominated
Golden Globe Awards	1999	Mulan (shared nomination with Matthew Wilder and David Zippel)	Best Original Score	Nominated
Golden Raspberry Awards	1986	Rambo: First Blood Part II (shared nomination with Peter Schless and Frank Stallone)	Worst Original Song	Won
Golden Raspberry Awards	1986	King Solomon's Mines	Worst Musical Score	Nominated
Golden Raspberry Awards	1996	Congo (shared nomination with Lebo M)	Worst Original Song	Nominated
Grammy Awards	1966	The Man From U.N.C.L.E. (shared nomination with Lalo Schifrin, Morton Stevens, and Walter Scharf)	Best Original Score from a Motion Picture or Television Show	Nominated
Grammy Awards	1975	QB VII	Album of Best Original Score Written for a Motion Picture or a Television Special	Nominated
Grammy Awards	1976	The Wind and the Lion	Album of Best Original Score Written for a Motion Picture or a Television Special	Nominated
Grammy Awards	1977	The Omen	Album of Best Original Score Written for a Motion Picture or a Television Special	Nominated
Grammy Awards	1980	Alien	Best Album of Original Score Written for a Motion Picture or a Television Special	Nominated
Grammy Awards	1981	"The Slaves" (track from Masada soundtrack)	Best Instrumental Composition	Nominated
Satellite Awards	1998	L.A. Confidential	Best Original Score	Nominated
Saturn Awards	1978	The Boys from Brazil	Best Music	Nominated
Saturn Awards	1978	Magic	Best Music	Nominated
Saturn Awards	1979	Star Trek: The Motion Picture	Best Music	Nominated
Saturn Awards	1981	Outland	Best Music	Nominated
Saturn Awards	1982	Poltergeist	Best Music	Nominated
Saturn Awards	1984	Gremlins	Best Music	Won
Saturn Awards	1986	Link	Best Music	Nominated
Saturn Awards	1990	Gremlins 2: The New Batch	Best Music	Nominated
Saturn Awards	1990	Total Recall	Best Music	Nominated
Saturn Awards	1991	Sleeping with the Enemy	Best Music	Nominated
Saturn Awards	1991	Warlock	Best Music	Nominated
Saturn Awards	1992	Basic Instinct	Best Music	Nominated
Saturn Awards	1994	The Shadow	Best Music	Nominated
Saturn Awards	1996	Star Trek: First Contact	Best Music	Nominated
Saturn Awards	1999	The Mummy	Best Music	Nominated
Saturn Awards	2000	Hollow Man	Best Music	Nominated
Saturn Awards	2003	Looney Tunes: Back in Action	Best Music	Nominated

== List of movies and series ==
=== 1950s ===
- The Lineup (TV series, 1954)
- Climax! (TV series, 1954)
- Black Patch (1957)
- Westinghouse Studio One: Tongue of Angels Season 10 episode 24 (live TV drama, 1958)
- Face of a Fugitive (1959)
- City of Fear (1959)
- Playhouse 90 (TV series, 1959)
- The Twilight Zone (TV series, 1959)
- Perry Mason (1959 TV series incidental music, episode 3–75)

=== 1960s ===
- The Gambler, the Nun, and the Radio (TV film, 1960)
- Full Circle (TV series theme, 1960)
- Pete and Gladys (TV series theme, 1960)
- Studs Lonigan (1960)
- Thriller (TV series, 1960)
- Dr. Kildare (theme and 7 episode scores, 1961)
- The Expendables (TV film, 1962)
- The Crimebusters (1962)
- Lonely Are the Brave (1962)
- The Spiral Road (1962)
- Freud (1962)
- The List of Adrian Messenger (1963)
- The Stripper (1963)
- A Gathering of Eagles (1963)
- Lilies of the Field (1963)
- Take Her, She's Mine (1963)
- The Prize (1963)
- Seven Days in May (1964)
- Shock Treatment (1964)
- Fate Is the Hunter (1964)
- The Man from U.N.C.L.E. (TV series theme and 3 episode scores, 1964)
- Rio Conchos (1964)
- The Satan Bug (1965)
- The Loner (TV series theme and 2 episode scores, 1965)
- Voyage to the Bottom of the Sea (TV series: 1 episode, 1965)
- In Harm's Way (1965)
- Von Ryan's Express (1965)
- Morituri (1965)
- The Agony and the Ecstasy (co-composer, 1965)
- A Patch of Blue (1965)
- Our Man Flint (1966)
- The Trouble with Angels (1966)
- Stagecoach (1966)
- The Blue Max (1966)
- Seconds (1966)
- The Sand Pebbles (1966)
- Warning Shot (1967)
- In Like Flint (1967)
- The Flim-Flam Man (1967)
- Hour of the Gun (1967)
- Sebastian (1968)
- Planet of the Apes (1968)
- The Detective (1968)
- Bandolero! (1968)
- Room 222 (TV series: theme and 2 episodes, 1969)
- 100 Rifles (1969)
- The Illustrated Man (1969)
- The Chairman (1969)
- Justine (1969)

=== 1970s ===
- Patton (1970)
- The Ballad of Cable Hogue (1970)
- Prudence and the Chief (TV film, 1970)
- The Brotherhood of the Bell (TV film, 1970)
- Tora! Tora! Tora! (1970)
- The Traveling Executioner (1970)
- Rio Lobo (1970)
- A Step Out of Line (TV movie, 1971)
- The Mephisto Waltz (1971)
- Escape from the Planet of the Apes (1971)
- Wild Rovers (1971)
- The Last Run (1971)
- Do Not Fold, Spindle, or Mutilate (TV film, 1971)
- Crosscurrent (1971) (TV movie)
- The Homecoming: A Christmas Story (TV film, 1971)
- Lights Out (TV film, 1972)
- Crawlspace (TV film, 1972)
- The Culpepper Cattle Co. (stock music only, 1972)
- The Other (1972)
- The Man (1972)
- Anna and the King (TV series theme and pilot score, 1972)
- Pursuit (TV film, 1972)
- The Waltons (TV series theme and several season 1 episodes, 1972)
- Barnaby Jones (TV series theme and pilot score, 1973)
- Shamus (1973)
- Hawkins (TV movie and series theme, 1973)
- The Red Pony (TV film, 1973)
- Ace Eli and Rodger of the Skies (1973)
- The Going Up of David Lev (TV film, 1973)
- One Little Indian (1973)
- The Don Is Dead (1973)
- Papillon (1973)
- Indict and Convict (TV film, 1974)
- Police Story (TV theme and pilot score, 1974)
- A Tree Grows in Brooklyn (TV film, 1974)
- Winter Kill (TV film, 1974)
- QB VII (1974) (miniseries)
- Chinatown (1974)
- S*P*Y*S (1974)
- Ransom (1975)
- Archer (1975, TV series theme and pilot score)
- Breakout (1975)
- The Reincarnation of Peter Proud (1975)
- The Wind and the Lion (1975)
- A Girl Named Sooner (TV film, 1975)
- Adams of Eagle Lake (TV series theme, 1975)
- Medical Story (1975, TV series theme)
- Take a Hard Ride (1975)
- Babe (TV film, 1975)
- Breakheart Pass (1975)
- The Hemingway Play (TV film, 1976)
- The Last Hard Men (stock music only, 1976)
- Logan's Run (1976)
- The Omen (1976)
- High Velocity (1976)
- The Cassandra Crossing (1976)
- Twilight's Last Gleaming (1977)
- Islands in the Stream (1977)
- MacArthur (1977)
- Capricorn One (1977)
- Damnation Alley (1977)
- Contract on Cherry Street (TV film, 1977)
- Coma (1978)
- Damien - Omen II (1978)
- The Swarm (1978)
- The Boys from Brazil (1978)
- Magic (1978)
- The Great Train Robbery (1978)
- Alien (1979)
- Players (1979)
- Star Trek: The Motion Picture (1979)

=== 1980s ===
- Caboblanco (1980)
- The Salamander (1981)
- Omen III: The Final Conflict (1981)
- Masada (TV miniseries, first half only, 1981)
- Inchon (1981)
- Outland (1981)
- Raggedy Man (1981)
- Night Crossing (1982)
- Poltergeist (1982)
- The Secret of NIMH (1982) - First score for an animated film
- The Challenge (1982)
- First Blood (1982)
- Psycho II (1983)
- Twilight Zone: The Movie (1983)
- Under Fire (1983)
- The Lonely Guy (1984)
- Gremlins (1984)
- Supergirl (1984)
- Runaway (1984)
- Baby: Secret of the Lost Legend (1985)
- Rambo: First Blood Part II (1985)
- Explorers (1985)
- Legend (1985, European version)
- King Solomon's Mines (1985)
- Link (1986)
- Amazing Stories (1986, TV series: episode "Boo!")
- Poltergeist II: The Other Side (1986)
- Hoosiers (1986)
- Star Trek: The Next Generation (theme only, 1987)
- Extreme Prejudice (1987)
- Innerspace (1987)
- Lionheart (1987)
- Rent-a-Cop (1987)
- Rambo III (1988)
- Criminal Law (1988)
- Alien Nation (1988) Rejected Score
- The 'Burbs (1989)
- Leviathan (1989)
- Warlock (1989)
- Star Trek V: The Final Frontier (1989)

=== 1990s ===
- Total Recall (1990)
- Gremlins 2: The New Batch (1990)
- The Russia House (1990)
- H.E.L.P. (1991, TV series theme)
- Not Without My Daughter (1991)
- Sleeping with the Enemy (1991)
- Mom and Dad Save the World (1992)
- Medicine Man (1992)
- Basic Instinct (1992)
- Forever Young (1992)
- Mr. Baseball (1992)
- Hollister (TV film theme, 1992)
- Love Field (1992)
- The Vanishing (1993)
- Dennis the Menace (1993)
- Rudy (1993)
- Six Degrees of Separation (1993)
- Malice (1993)
- Matinee (1993)
- Angie (1994)
- Bad Girls (1994)
- The Shadow (1994)
- The River Wild (1994)
- I.Q. (1994)
- Congo (1995)
- First Knight (1995)
- Star Trek: Voyager (TV series theme, 1995)
- Powder (1995)
- City Hall (1996)
- Executive Decision (1996)
- Chain Reaction (1996)
- Star Trek: First Contact (1996)
- The Ghost and the Darkness (1996)
- Fierce Creatures (1997)
- Air Force One (1997)
- L.A. Confidential (1997)
- The Edge (1997)
- Deep Rising (1998)
- U.S. Marshals (1998)
- Small Soldiers (1998)
- Mulan (1998)
- Star Trek: Insurrection (1998)
- The Mummy (1999)
- The Haunting (1999)
- The 13th Warrior (1999)

=== 2000s ===
- Hollow Man (2000)
- Soarin' Over California (simulator ride, 2001)
- Along Came a Spider (2001)
- The Last Castle (2001)
- The Sum of All Fears (2002)
- Star Trek: Nemesis (2002)
- Looney Tunes: Back in Action (2003)
- Timeline (2003) rejected score
- The Kennedy Center Honors (song 2003)

== Film studio and television production fanfares ==
- Cinema International Corporation (1978–1986)
- Carolco Pictures (1987)
- Warner Bros. Pictures (1988)
- Cinergi Pictures (1993–1998)
- Universal Pictures (1997–present; arrangement of Goldsmith's score by Brian Tyler in use since 2012)
- C2 Pictures (2003–2008)
- Paramount Pictures (1976–2004)
- Paramount Television (1987)
- Phoenix Entertainment Group (1986)

== See also ==
- List of film score composers
- List of Star Trek composers and music
