= Gloria Campaner =

Italian pianist

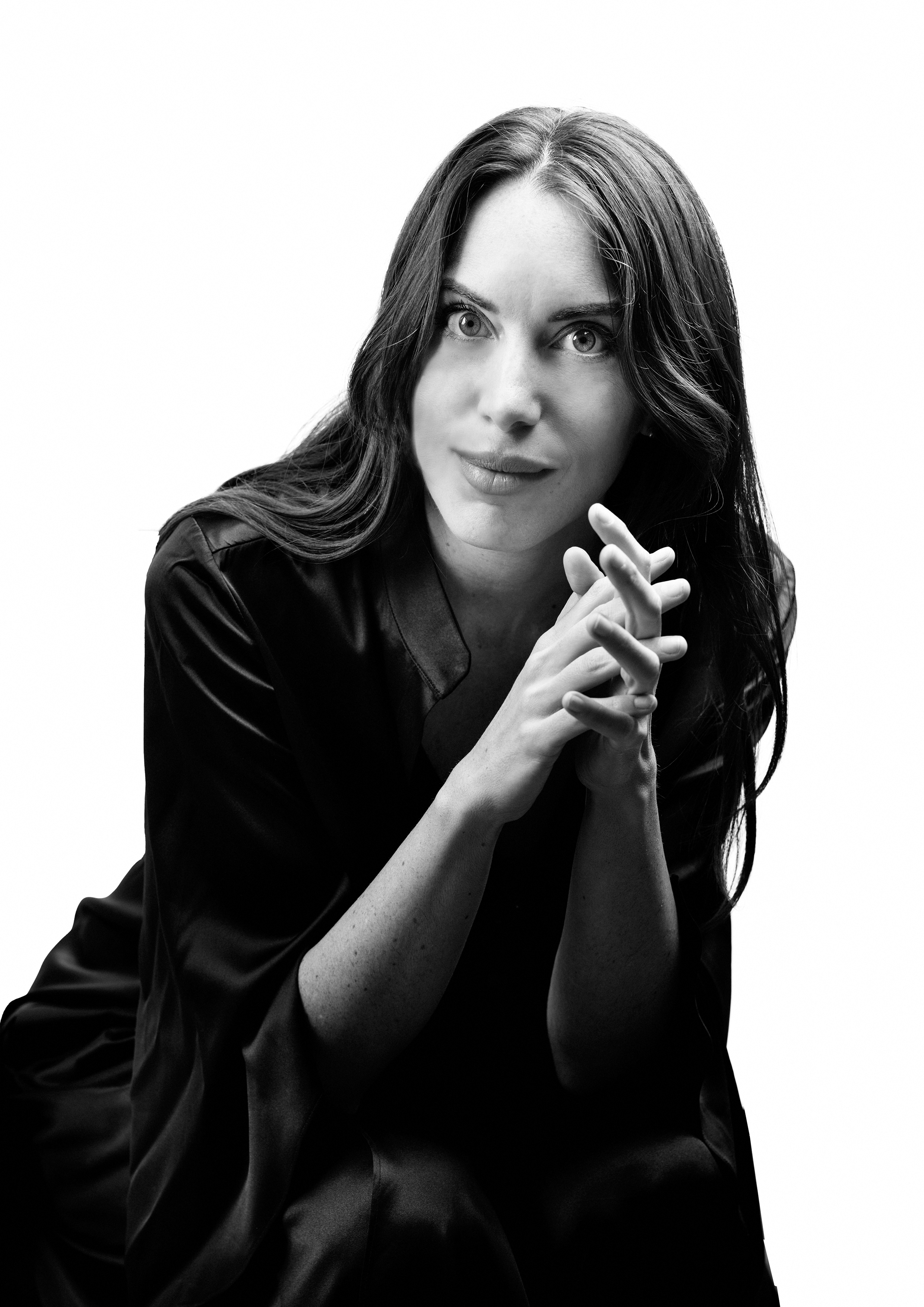

Background information
- Birth name: Gloria Campaner
- Born: 1986 (age 38–39); Jesolo (Venice), Italy
- Genres: Classical
- Occupation: Pianist
- Instrument: Piano
- Years active: 1998–present
- Labels: EMI, Warner
- Website: gloriacampaner.com

Gloria Campaner (born 5 April 1986) is an Italian pianist. She was born in Jesolo (Venice), Italy in 1986.

== Education ==
Born in the Venetian inlands, Campaner started playing the piano at the age of 4 under the guidance of Daniela Vidali. She performed her first public recital at 5 and made her debut with the Venice Symphony Orchestra at the age of 12 with Margola piano concerto. Campaner earned her master's degree with Bruno Mezzena at the Music Academy in Pescara and has performed in masterclasses with such distinguished musicians as Jerome Rose, Sergio Perticaroli, Pavel Gililov, Lilya Zilberstein, Dmitri Bashkirov, and Boris Petrushansky following courses at prestigious institutions such as Oxford's Hertford College, Accademia Incontri col Maestro di Imola, Salzburg Mozarteum, Ticino Musica, and Mannes School of Music in New York. She focused her studies on the Russian school under the guidance of Konstantin Bogino while following university lectures on Russian language and literature. Campaner moved to Germany in 2008 where she earned her ‘konzert exam’ diploma at the HFM Karlsruhe with piano professor Fany Solter.

== Awards ==
Gloria Campaner is a laureate of several international competitions such as the Paderewski International Piano Competition in Los Angeles (Silver Medal, Best Paderewski and Chopin performances), the IBLA Grand Prize (First Prize, Prokofiev Special Award), the XI Concours International de Musique du Maroc in Casablanca (Prix de Jury, Franz Liszt), and the Cultural Foundation Pro Europa in Freiburg (European Prize for Culture). In 2009, Campaner received an artistic residency from the Brahms Foundation of Baden-Baden. During the 2011–12 season, she was named "Ambassador of Culture" by the European Union for the project Piano: Reflet de la Culture Europeenne. Campaner was a resident musician at the Italian Institute of Culture in Paris (Les Promesses de l’Art, 2013). In 2014, she was awarded a fellowship by London's Borletti-Buitoni Trust, the first Italian female pianist to receive such an honour.

== Career ==
Campaner has performed orchestras such as the English Chamber Orchestra, Baden-Baden Philharmonic, Süd-Deutsche Philharmonic, Seoul Philharmonic, AfiA Orchestra of Tokyo, Johannesburg Philharmonic Orchestra, Orchestra della Svizzera Italiana in Lugano, along with appearances at prestigious venues such as the Cadogan Hall in London, the Walt Disney Concert Hall in Los Angeles, Mozarteum University Salzburg, China's National Centre for the Performing Arts in Beijing, Kioi Hall in Tokyo, École Normale de Musique de Paris, Warsaw & Krakow Philharmonie, and the Parco della Musica Auditorium in Rome.

She often performs with such artists as Johannes Moser, Ivry Gitlis, Ana Chumachenco, Michael Kugel, Sergei Krylov, Quartetto di Cremona as well as with members from prestigious orchestras such as the Berlin Philharmonic, Stuttgart Radio Symphony Orchestra, La Scala Philharmonic, Rome's Orchestra dell'Accademia Nazionale di Santa Cecilia and the Royal Concertgebouw Orchestra. Campaner also has had unusual collaborations such as with jazz musician Leszek Możdżer, visual artist Natan Sinigaglia, and Luigi Lo Cascio, one of Italy's most recognized actor. Campaner also makes appearances as a pianist, actress, and artist in Philippe Caland's soon-to-be-released independent movie "The Butterfly Confirmation." During the summer of 2017, Campaner was resident artist at the Marlboro Festival, working along with pianists such as Mitsuko Uchida and the late Leon Fleisher.

Campaner is the artistic director of the Associazione musicale Vincenzo Bellini Messina concert series in Sicily.

== Recordings ==
Her debut CD was released in 2013 by EMI. A live CD of her concert in Turin performing Rachmaninoff Second Piano Concerto with RAI National Symphony Orchestra & Juraj Valčuha was released in 2016 by Warner Classics. A second live recording of Schumann’s Piano Concerto was released by Warner in 2018 (Nomination ICMA 2020). In 2021 a solo CD dedicated to Chopin’s 24 Préludes Op. 28 was also released by Warner.

== Personal life ==
She lives in Turin with her life partner Alessandro Baricco.

== Sources ==
- Gloria Campaner Interview for CIDIM
- Gloria Campaner Biography on La Musica di Rai3
