= Hagen Quartet =

Austrian string quartet

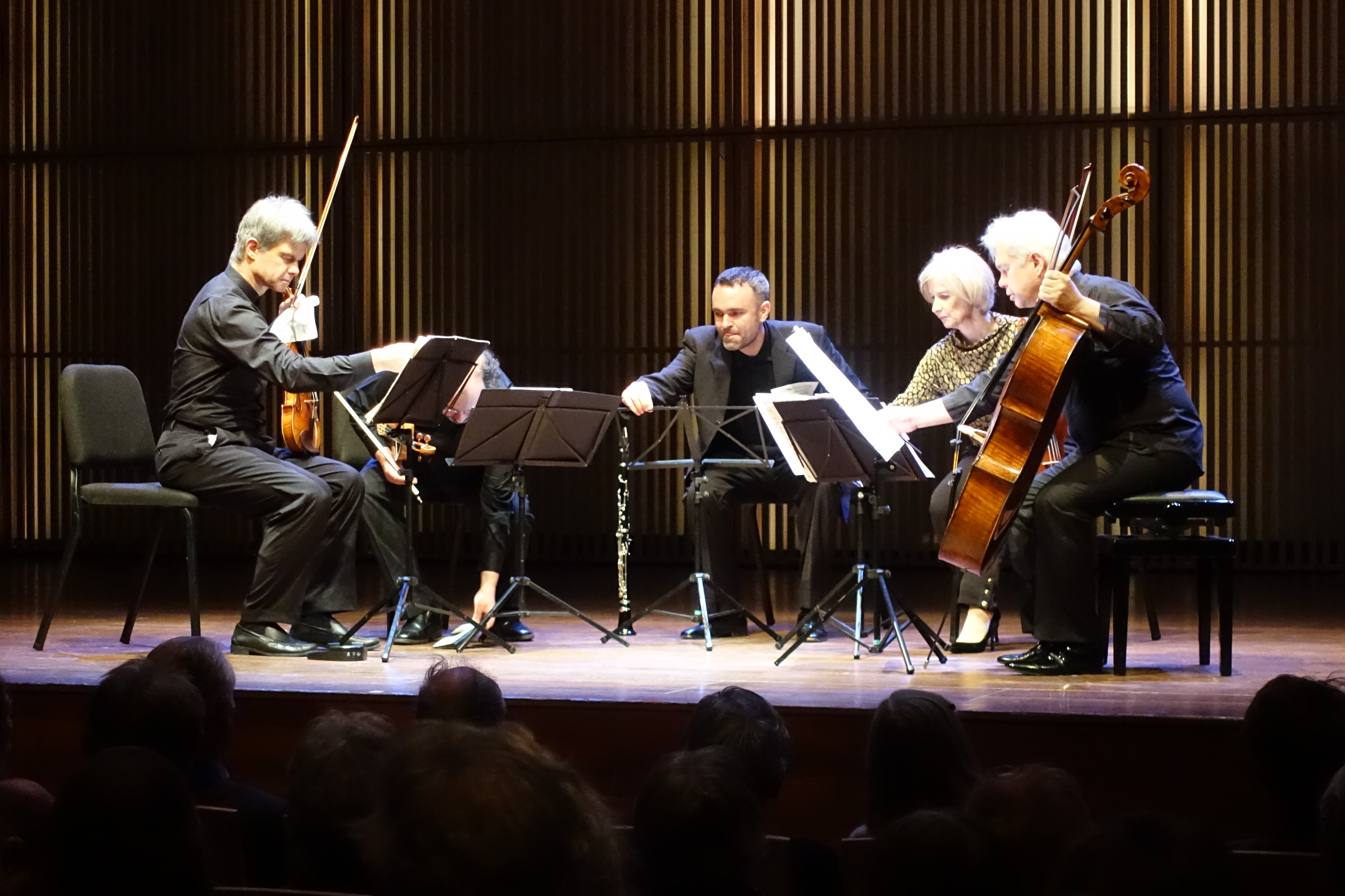
Hagen Quartet in Muziekgebouw aan 't IJ with clarinettist Jörg Widmann

The Hagen Quartet is an Austrian string quartet founded in 1981 by four siblings, Lukas, Angelika (first replaced by Annette Bik, who was then replaced by Rainer Schmidt in 1987), Veronika and Clemens, in Salzburg. The quartet members are teachers and mentors at the Salzburg Mozarteum and the Hochschule für Musik Basel. The ensemble made its Salzburg Festival debut in 1984. The complete recordings of the Mozart string quartets were released in 2006. In the 2012–2013 season, the Hagen Quartet performed the complete Beethoven cycle in New York, Tokyo, Paris, London, Salzburg and Vienna. They performed, between December 2013 and August 2017, on the four famous Stradivarius instruments played previously by the Paganini Quartet, the Cleveland String Quartet, and the Tokyo String Quartet, respectively. Those instruments are now being played by the Quartetto di Cremona. The quartet retires in 2026.

== Awards ==
- 1981 Lockenhaus Chamber Music Festival, Prize of the Jury, Audience Prize
- 1982 Portsmouth International String Quartet Competition, First Prize, Audience Prize
- 1996 Accademia Musicale Chigiana International Prize
- 2011 ECHO Klassik Ensemble of the Year for "Hagen Quartett 30" (MYR006)

== Members ==
The current members are:

- Lukas Hagen, violin
- Rainer Schmidt, violin
- Veronika Hagen, viola
- Clemens Hagen, cello
