= Daniel Heifetz =

American concert violinist and pedagogue (born 1948)

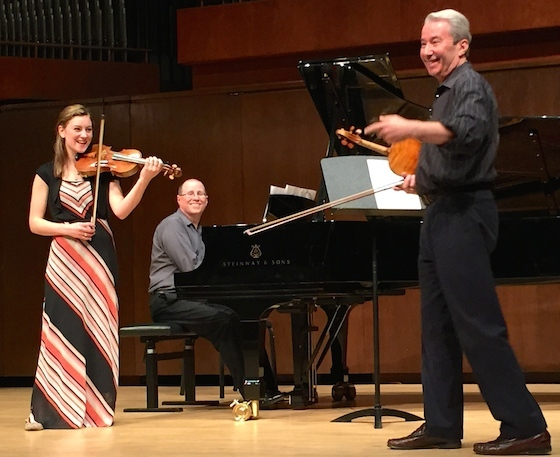
Daniel Heifetz, giving a master class onstage at the Juilliard School

Daniel Alan Heifetz (born November 20, 1948) is an American concert violinist and pedagogue best known as the Founder of the Heifetz International Music Institute. His career has been focused on education and the art of communication through performance.

== Early life ==
Daniel Heifetz was raised in Southern California, the son of Milton Heifetz and Betsy Heifetz (née Baron), and began violin studies at the age of six. At sixteen, Heifetz became a student of Efrem Zimbalist at the Curtis Institute of Music in Philadelphia. He was also coached by Jascha Brodsky and, upon Zimbalist's retirement, concluded his studies with Ivan Galamian. He made his New York orchestral debut at Avery Fisher Hall in Lincoln Center in a performance of the Tchaikovsky Violin Concerto with the National Symphony Orchestra. Heifetz was also mentored at the beginning of his career by both the Polish/Mexican violinist Henryk Szeryng, who introduced him to the Russian violinist David Oistrakh. It was Oistrakh who introduced him to the impresario Sol Hurok who took Heifetz under management. His younger brother is Ronald A. Heifetz, the King Hussein bin Talal Senior Lecturer in Public Leadership and founder of the Center for Public Leadership at the John F. Kennedy School of Government, Harvard University, and co-founder of Cambridge Leadership Associates.

== Career ==
Heifetz was a prizewinner in both the Merriweather-Post Competition in Washington, D.C. and The International Tchaikovsky Competition in Moscow. After the latter competition, Heifetz donated his prize money to the families of jailed dissidents Alexander Ginzburg and Natan Shcharansky. Richard L. Thornburgh, former United States Attorney General and Governor of Pennsylvania, held a state dinner to honor the gesture.

In 1990, he was a soloist with the Naumburg Orchestral Concerts, in the Naumburg Bandshell, Central Park, in the summer series.

== Teaching and adjudication ==
Heifetz has served as professor of violin at three major universities: The Peabody Institute of the Johns Hopkins University, Carnegie Mellon University, and the University of Maryland College Park. In addition to these positions, Heifetz has given master classes all over the world. In May 2015, he was one of the featured Masterclass presenters at the Starling-Delay Violin Symposium held at the Juilliard School in New York. In August and September 2016, Heifetz served on the jury of the first Shanghai Isaac Stern International Violin Competition, which received recognition and engendered some controversy for posting the jurors' scores throughout every round. In January and February 2017, Heifetz was the chair of the seven-member jury at the first Elmar Oliveira International Violin Competition, held on the campus of Lynn University in Boca Raton, Florida.

== Heifetz International Music Institute ==
In 1996, Heifetz founded the Heifetz International Music Institute for young musicians from around the world. It is primarily a six-week summer program that now takes place at Mary Baldwin University in Staunton, Virginia. The institute attracts faculty from national and international conservatories and offers a program in Heifetz Performance and Communication Training that teaches musicians to communicate the emotion of music by way of a series of classes in public speaking, voice, drama, movement, and freedom of expression. The Heifetz Institute offers career development opportunities to its alumni through a program called Heifetz on Tour. In November 2014, Heifetz described his philosophy behind the communication training offered at the Heifetz Institute in a TEDx presentation given in Charlottesville, Virginia. In 2019, Heifetz was succeeded as Artistic Director of the Heifetz Institute by Nicholas Kitchen, the first violinist and co-founder of the Borromeo String Quartet, the Ensemble in Residence at the Institute.
