= Quartetto di Cremona =

Italian string quartett

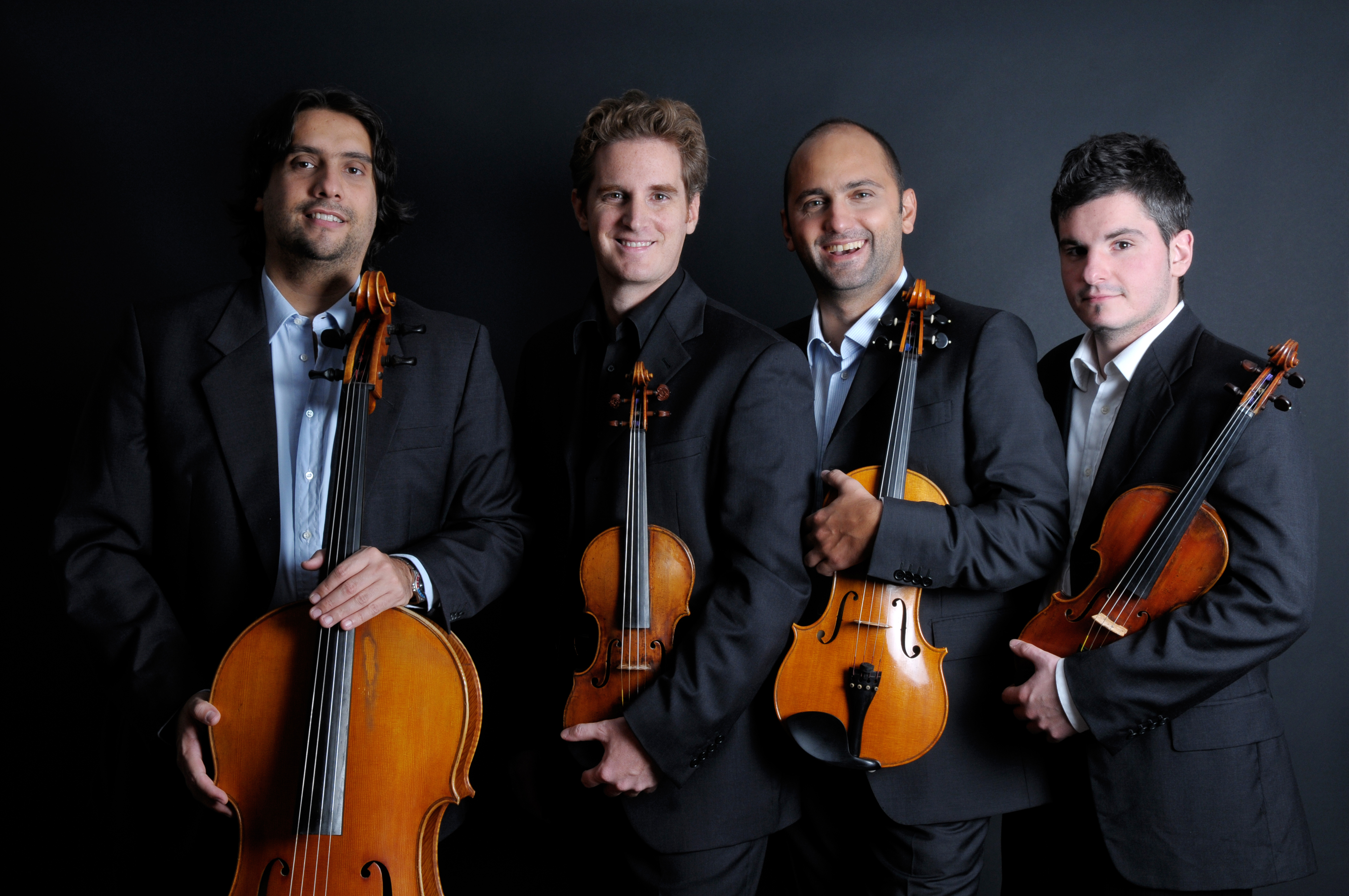

Background information
- Also known as: Cremona Quartet
- Origin: Genova, Italy
- Genres: Classical
- Occupation: String quartet
- Years active: 2000–present
- Labels: Decca, Audite, Genuin
- Members: Cristiano Gualco, violin Paolo Andreoli, violin Simone Gramaglia, viola Giovanni Scaglione, cello
- Website: www.quartettodicremona.com

The Quartetto di Cremona (English: Cremona Quartet) is an Italian string quartet founded in Cremona and considered one of the best of its generation.

== Origins and activities ==
The most recent incarnation of the quartet was formed in the year 2000, while studying at the Walter Stauffer Academy in Cremona with Salvatore Accardo, Rocco Filippini, and Bruno Giuranna. The ensemble, with the current members since 2002, continued their studies with Piero Farulli of the Quartetto Italiano at the Fiesole School of Music and with Hatto Beyerle of the Alban Berg Quartet. The group have since made a name for itself as one of the most interesting chamber ensembles on the international scene.

It has performed at major international festivals in Europe, South America, Australia and the United States—such as the Beethovenfest in Bonn, Bozar Festival in Brussels, Festival of Turku, Kammermusik Gemeinde in Hannover, and Perth Festival in Australia—and in the most prestigious concert halls all over the world, such as the Konzerthaus in Berlin, Wigmore Hall in London, Barge Music in New York, and Beethovenhaus in Bonn.

Since 2011 Quartetto di Cremona has been Artist-in-residence at the Società del Quartetto in Milan for projects which include concerts and collaborations that culminated in 2014 with the complete performance of the Beethoven quartets, to celebrate the 150th anniversary of the institution. Beginning in 2012 the ensemble was also Artist-in-residence at the Academy of Santa Cecilia in Rome.

International critics have noted the artistic and interpretative qualities of the Quartetto di Cremona. Following a concert at the Wigmore Hall, the British magazine The Strad wrote, "Dynamic contouring was as sleek and elegant as an Armani suit, and it tailored the music to perfection." In Australia, the quartet was acclaimed as the "glory of the Perth Festival" and the Süddeutsche Zeitung described them as “one of the most exciting quartets of the current generation.”

Radio and television stations around the world (such as RAI, WDR, BBC, VRT, SDR, and ABC) regularly broadcast the Quartetto di Cremona concerts in repertoire ranging from the early works of Haydn to contemporary music, particularly works of Fabio Vacchi, Lorenzo Ferrero, Helmut Lachenmann, and Silvia Colasanti. The group collaborates with world-renowned artists such as Bruno Giuranna, Massimo Quarta, Enrico Dindo, Carbonare Alessandro, Andrea Lucchesini, Pietro de Maria, Gloria Campaner, Angela Hewitt, Ivo Pogorelich, Lilya Zilberstein, Cédric Tiberghien, and Pieter Wispelwey.

An important part of the activity is teaching masterclasses throughout Europe. In autumn 2011 the quartet was appointed to the Chair of the String quartet program at the Walter Stauffer Academy in Cremona.

Notable recordings include the complete string quartets by Fabio Vacchi, which were released in April 2011 by Decca. For their recordings of the complete string quartets by Beethoven (Audite), the Quartetto di Cremona was awarded the ECHO Klassik 2017 and the ICMA Award 2018.

The Quartetto di Cremona was chosen by The Friends of Stradivari association in order to promote and develop the knowledge of Cremona art of making string instruments.

== Members ==
- Cristiano Gualco, violin
- Paolo Andreoli, violin
- Simone Gramaglia, viola
- Giovanni Scaglione, cello

== Instruments ==
- Nicolò Amati (1640)
- Giovanni Battista Guadagnini (1757)
- Alberto Giordano (1995)
- Marino e Mario Capicchioni (1974)

== Awards and recognition ==
- 2002 Franco Gulli Award for the best Italian Chamber Music Ensemble
- 2005 Borletti – Buitoni Trust Foundation Fellowship
- 2017 ECHO Klassik
- 2018 ICMA Award
