= And God Created Woman (1988 film) =

1988 film by Roger Vadim

- Promotional poster for the film
- Directed by: Roger Vadim
- Written by: R. J. Stewart
- Based on: Et Dieu... créa la femme 1956 film by Roger Vadim
- Produced by: Mitchell Cannold; Steven Reuther; Ruth Vitale
- Starring: Rebecca De Mornay; Vincent Spano; Frank Langella; Donovan Leitch
- Cinematography: Stephen M. Katz
- Edited by: Suzanne Pettit
- Music by: Thomas Chase; Steve Rucker
- Distributed by: Vestron Pictures
- Release date: March 4, 1988
- Running time: 98 minutes
- Country: United States
- Language: English
- Budget: $5 million
- Box office: $717,376

And God Created Woman is a 1988 American prison comedy-drama film directed by Roger Vadim in his final theatrical release and starring Rebecca De Mornay, Vincent Spano and Frank Langella. It has the same title as the 1956 French film Et Dieu… créa la femme (And God Created Woman) starring Brigitte Bardot, also directed by Vadim, but has a completely different story.

== Plot ==
Robin Shea is a convict in a New Mexico prison. She manages to escape, but mistakenly hitches a ride in the limo of James Tiernan, a politician who was visiting the prison as part of his campaign for governor. He returns her to the prison in secret. While changing back into prison clothes, Robin meets Billy Moran, a carpenter and handyman who is doing work in the compound under supervision that is supposed to keep him isolated from the female inmates. Billy helps Robin temporarily hide from the guards, and they have sex.

Robin learns who James is from a political ad on television where he talks about his strong stance on prison issues. She manages to call him at his campaign headquarters, asking for help on her upcoming parole hearing. James gives her advice, one suggestion of which is that she get married. Robin approaches Billy, offering him five thousand dollars to marry her for a year so she can get out of prison. Billy accepts, they are married and Robin is released not long after.

Robin moves in with Billy, who also lives with his brother Peter and Billy's son Timmy. Initially there is a clash of personalities due to the contrast between Billy's serious demeanor and Robin's wild-child nature. Billy is interested in having a real relationship with Robin, who instead insists that it's just an arrangement, and that she wants to focus on her musical career. Robin starts up a band, which Peter joins, and also meets up again with James, who uses Robin as a poster child for successful prison reform on his campaign.

Robin spends more time with the family, getting close to Peter and Timmy, which upsets Billy. Robin suggests they see other people, which Billy accepts. Billy has sex with another woman, while Robin has sex with James, who is married. Afterward the pair confront each other jealously over their being with other people.

The next morning Robin reconciles with Billy, helping him out when his jeep breaks down and spending time with him at work restoring an old museum. They have sex in Billy's workshop, and are interrupted by a group of tourists, who take pictures of the pair. At first Robin's public indecency is hushed up due to her status as James' poster child for giving convicts second chances, but when James sees the pictures he is jealous, and orders that Robin's parole be revoked. The police come for Robin when she is performing with her band at a bar. Robin flees to James' house for help, but he turns her away. Robin goes back to Billy's house, where he has packed up her things and prepared money for her. Billy promises to help her no matter what she wants to do, and Robin decides she is tired of running.

Billy and Robin secretly crash James' political dinner. Robin takes to the stage with her band, praising James' assistance in "helping" her. Her passionate performance earns them a standing ovation, which in turn helps James' image. James agrees to help Robin, and she no longer has to go back to prison. James goes on to win the election and Robin and Billy return home together, happily married.

== Cast ==
- Rebecca De Mornay as Robin Shea
- Vincent Spano as Billy Moran
- Frank Langella as James Tiernan
- Donovan Leitch as Peter Moran
- Judith Chapman as Alexandra Tiernan
- Jamie McEnnan as Timmy Moran
- Benjamin Mouton as Blue
- Dave Shelley as David
- Einstein Brown as Einstein
- David López as Hawk
- Thelma Houston as Prison Singer
- Gail Boggs as Denise
- Pat Lee as Inmate
- Gary Goetzman as Al Lawrence
- Kenny Ortega as Mike
- Christopher Murray as Harold
- Gary Grubbs as Rupert Willis
- Roger Vadim as Photographer (uncredited)

== Production ==
Roger Vadim announced his plan to make a new version of And God Created Woman in 1983 along with producers George Braunstein and Ron Hamady. Vadim:

Friends suggested that I remake the film. I was curious to see how Juliette (the main character in the 1956 film) would have changed and not changed in 1983. In 1956, Frenchwomen were presenting the image of a new, modern kind of female. Today, the newest prototypes are coming from America. The other reason for remaking And God Created Woman is because the story itself is good. The basic situation involves a young woman whose amoral escapades make her an outsider, the pink wolf in the herd. The 1950s, with its restrictive morality, was the perfect time to make the film. In the 1980s we are back in a similar era and will have the girl confronted by the Moral Majority, which is still a good proportion of this country.

Vadim announced he and producers would undertake a nationwide talent quest to discover a 19-20 year old to star. RJ Stewart was reported as writing on a script with Diane Lane mentioned as a leading contender for the star role Robin Shea.

Vadim selected Rebecca De Mornay to play the lead. "He wasn't the kind of man I expected to meet," recalled the actor. "I found him very funny and warm. He makes me feel secure and I feel like I can trust him not to turn this into an exploitation film." De Mornay had seen the original movie when she was younger. She said during filming that:

In some ways I'm sorry they're even using the same title. Our story has nothing to do with the first film. It's entirely different. This is an American love story set in New Mexico. But of course it was on the strength of the title that Vadim was able to promote interest in the project.

Roger Vadim stated during filming:

What is important for me here is once again to tell the story of a sexy, funny and somewhat outrageous young woman within a social context. That's why, even though practically everything about the original has been changed and I don't consider this in any sense a remake, I feel justified in using the title... Santa Fe in the 80s is not Saint Tropez in the 50s, except perhaps in the sense that there is no gap between the classes. Rich people, artists, blue collar and Indian - different parts of the society mix together, which was true of St Tropez before it became the circus it is now. And, more important, in the last 30 years women have won many freedoms - social freedom, professional freedom, sexual freedom. Robin, the girl in the film, claims all these freedoms - in a way that's cerebral, she's aware of her personality, while Bardot behaved totally instinctively.

Production took place in New Mexico, including parts of the New Mexico State Penitentiary, Santa Fe Plaza, Randall Davey Museum, Pecos National Historical Park, and the New Mexico Museum of Art. A local film critic wrote of the resulting production, "Just sit back and savor the many inside jokes and references that only locals will fully appreciate. ... To bestow credit where it is due, And God Created Woman gives Santa Fe the most luxuriant exposure it has ever received on the screen. Vadim's original version turned St. Tropez on the French Riviera into one of the world's hottest tourist Meccas. The new version won't cause as big a splash, but a smart travel agent could make a few quick bucks instituting a behind-the-scenes Woman tour."

== Reception ==
The movie received poor reviews. According to critic Roger Ebert, the two films shared little except a title and a director, writing "Is this the first time a title has been remade, instead of a movie?". He gives the movie two stars out of four, praising the performances of De Mornay and Vincent Spano and concluding "You have to put the plot on hold, overlook the contrivances of the last half hour and find a way to admire how De Mornay plays the big scene, even while despising the scene itself. If you can do that, you’ll find good work here."

On the review aggregator website Rotten Tomatoes, 38% of 8 critics' reviews are positive, with an average rating of 5.1/10. De Mornay was nominated for a Golden Raspberry Award for Worst Actress, where she lost to Liza Minnelli for both Arthur 2: On the Rocks and Rent-a-Cop at the 9th Golden Raspberry Awards.
