= The New Adventures of Pippi Longstocking =

1988 film by Ken Annakin

- Theatrical release poster
- Directed by: Ken Annakin
- Screenplay by: Ken Annakin
- Based on: Pippi Longstocking by Astrid Lindgren
- Produced by: Gary Mehlman; Walter Moshay
- Starring: Tami Erin; Eileen Brennan; Dennis Dugan; Dianne Hull; George DiCenzo; John Schuck; Dick Van Patten
- Cinematography: Roland Smith
- Edited by: Ken Zemke
- Music by: Misha Segal
- Production companies: Longstocking Productions; Svensk Filmindustri
- Distributed by: Columbia Pictures (United States and selected territories); Svensk Filmindustri (Sweden)
- Release dates: March 8, 1988 (Tokyo); July 29, 1988 (United States); September 9, 1988 (Sweden)
- Running time: 101 minutes
- Countries: United States; Sweden
- Language: English
- Budget: $8–10 million
- Box office: $3.6 million

The New Adventures of Pippi Longstocking is a 1988 musical adventure film written and directed by Ken Annakin, based on the Pippi Longstocking book series by Astrid Lindgren. It is a Swedish-German-American joint venture produced by Longstocking Productions, and Svensk Filmindustri. While the title suggests a continuation of previous entries, it is in fact a new telling of the original story.

Filmed in Fernandina Beach on Amelia Island and at soundstages in Jacksonville, Florida, the film premiered on March 8, 1988, in Tokyo, before it was released on July 29 in the United States and September 9 in Sweden. It received mixed reviews upon release and became a financial failure. It was Annakin's last finished feature film before he died on April 22, 2009.

== Plot ==
In 1951, Pippi Longstocking, who travels around the world on the ship Hoptoad with her sailor father, Efraim, encounters a sudden storm caused by a volcanic eruption. After Efraim disappears into the sea, Pippi travels to the small coastal town of Rocksby, accompanied by her horse, Alfonso, and monkey, Mr. Nilsson. She takes up residence at her father's house, Villa Villekulla, which the neighborhood children believe is haunted.

Soon Tommy and Annika Settigren venture into the house after seeing lights in all the windows. Looking for ghosts, they meet Pippi, Mr. Nilsson, and Alfonso instead. They become friends and get into various adventures together such as making pancakes, cleaning the floor with scrubbing shoes, serving ice cream to residents of the local children's home, riding a motorcycle, and dodging "splunks". Pippi must also fight off Mr. Blackhart and his henchmen, Rype and Rancid, who want to demolish her house and sell the property, as well as avoid being legally taken to the children's home by the owner, Miss Bannister. She agrees to escape and flee with Tommy and Annika in a homemade autogyro to avoid this fate. However, they are rescued after nearly going over a waterfall while riding down a river in barrels.

Miss Bannister guilts Pippi into going to the children's home, and as a result, she is forced to leave Mr. Nilsson and Alfonso behind. She is unable to fit in with the other orphans due to her lack of discipline and education. However, after she sends a message in a bottle to Efraim, she rescues two of the orphans after the children's home catches on fire accidentally started by the janitor and is lauded by the townspeople as a heroine. She is then allowed to return home to Villa Villekulla.

Pippi is reunited with Efraim on Christmas Day, and he offers her the chance to become a cannibal princess of the uncharted island he had washed ashore on and was crowned king. She agrees and everyone comes to bid her a tearful farewell. Just as they prepare to set sail, she decides to stay after seeing that everyone is sad to see her go. She explains to Efraim that she can't leave Tommy and Annika. He understands and tells her that he loves her. As he sets sail, he tells her that if she needs anything she knows where to find him. They say goodbye and she goes home with Tommy, Annika, Mr. Nilsson, and Alfonso.

== Cast ==
- Tami Erin as Pippilotta Delicatessa Windowshade Mackrelmint Efraim's Daughter "Pippi" Longstocking, a spunky eleven-year-old girl who arrives on land after her father is lost at sea. Her mother died when she was a baby.
- David Seaman Jr. as Tommy Settigren, Annika's older brother who becomes friends with Pippi. He appears to also have a crush on her.
- Cory Crow as Annika Settigren, Tommy's little sister who becomes friends with Pippi.
- Eileen Brennan as Miss Bannister, the well-meaning no-nonsense owner of the children's home who believes that Pippi will be safer under her care. She tries to explain to her that because she's an unaccompanied minor and can offer no proof that Efraim is still alive by law she has to live at the children's home.
- Dennis Dugan as Mr. Settigren, Tommy and Annika's father, and Rocksby's attorney; he finds Pippi's influence on his children disruptive.
- Dianne Hull as Mrs. Settigren, Tommy and Annika's mother, and a housewife; while initially fond of Pippi, she becomes increasingly concerned with her children's well-being.
- George DiCenzo as Mr. Blackhart, a local, shady businessman who wants to acquire Villa Villekulla in order to raise real estate.
- J. D. Dickinson as Rype, one of Blackhart's henchmen.
- Chub Bailly as Rancid, one of Blackhart's henchmen.
- Dick Van Patten as Gregory, a strange inventor of glue that enables people to walk up and down walls.
- John Schuck as Efraim Longstocking, Pippi's widowed father and captain of the ship Hoptoad.
  - Michael Mendelson as Efraim's singing voice.
- Branscombe Richmond as Fridolf, Efraim's cabin boy and best friend. He is in charge of homeschooling Pippi while she's at sea. He agrees with her that school is a waste of time.
- Fay Masterson as Head Girl, a bossy older girl at the children's home. She wants Pippi to understand that she's safer at the children's home and taken care of.
- Carole Kean as Miss Messerschmidt, a strict teacher at the children's home who wants Pippi to get an education.
- Frank Welker and Michael Bell as the voices of Mr. Nilsson and Alfonso, Pippi's pet monkey and Appaloosa horse respectively.
- Clark Niederjohn as Jake, the town pilot who befriends Pippi and invents an autogyro.

== Songs ==
1. "Pippi Longstocking Is Coming Into Your Town" – Margie Nelson and the International Children's Choir
2. "We Live on the Seas" – Efraim, Pippi, and the Hoptoad Crew
3. "Scrubbing Day" – Marlene Ricci, Pippi, Tommy, Annika, and the International Children's Choir
4. "Pippi Longstocking Is Coming Into Your Town (Reprise)" - Margie Nelson, Pippi, and the International Children's Choir
5. "Runnin' Away" – Margie Nelson, Pippi, Tommy, Annika, and the International Children's Choir
6. "Runnin' Away (Reprise)" – Pippi, Tommy, and Annika
7. "Sticky Situation" – Sandra Simmons
8. "Merry Christmas Tree" – Gail Lopata Lennon, Pippi, and the International Children's Choir
9. "We Live on the Seas (Reprise)" – Pippi, Efraim, and the Hoptoad Crew
10. "Pippi Longstocking Is Coming Into Your Town (2nd Reprise)" – Margie Nelson and the International Children's Choir

== Production ==
=== Development ===
The idea of an American film adaptation of the Pippi Longstocking series by Astrid Lindgren was first developed when producer Gary Mehlman's daughters, Romy and Alexandra, convinced him to try to secure the rights from Lindgren. When he wrote a letter to her expressing interest in acquiring the rights to the film in November 1983, she declined, as she regarded the character as "her own daughter".

Eventually, in August 1984, Mehlman traveled to Stockholm during pre-production of The Yellow Jersey to meet with Lindgren and Svensk Filmindustri executives Lennart Wiklund and Conny Planborg for the film rights. Although Svensk Filmindustri was willing to give non-Scandinavian rights to the film, Lindgren was hesitant. After Romy hugged her during their introduction, she gave her approval. After returning from Stockholm, Mehlman met with Walter Moshay, an investment consultant and Mehlman's best friend, and Mishaal Kamal Adham, a Saudi Arabian investor who never produced a film before. Having convinced Moshay and Adham to produce the film with a $12–15 million budget, Mehlman formed Longstocking Productions with them; Mehlman and Moshay served as producers, while Adham served as an executive producer. On August 15, it was announced that Mehlman purchased the rights to the film and that Kimi Peck would write the script for the film. Ken Annakin and Gary Melham were planning to film a sequel to the movie.

On October 16, 1985, it was announced that Ken Annakin would write the screenplay and production was scheduled to start early in 1986 with an estimated budget of $10–12 million; Bavaria, Florida and North Carolina listed as filming locations. At the American Film Market on February 25, 1986, Producers Sales Organization announced that they acquired the foreign sales rights to the film, with TriStar Pictures distributing it in North America.

=== Casting ===
To cast the titular character, Mehlman, Moshay, and Annakin, along with casting director Garrison True and executive vice president of marketing Gary Shapiro, began an international search for potential actresses on October 7, 1985. Over 8,000 actresses from United States, Canada and the United Kingdom participated in the auditions. After going through two callbacks and a screen test, Tami Erin was eventually selected for the role on February 21, 1986. She was excited at the prospect of working on the film, saying, "This is it! The [hotel elevator] door opened and [...] [Annakin] said, 'You got it!' Oh, oh! I had no idea I would get so emotional after all these years, oh my God! I just jumped in his arms!"

On Erin's casting, Annakin said, "I don't want [Tami] to turn into Pippi. I want Pippi to turn into [Tami]. I've never seen anyone radiate sunshine the way she does."

=== Filming ===
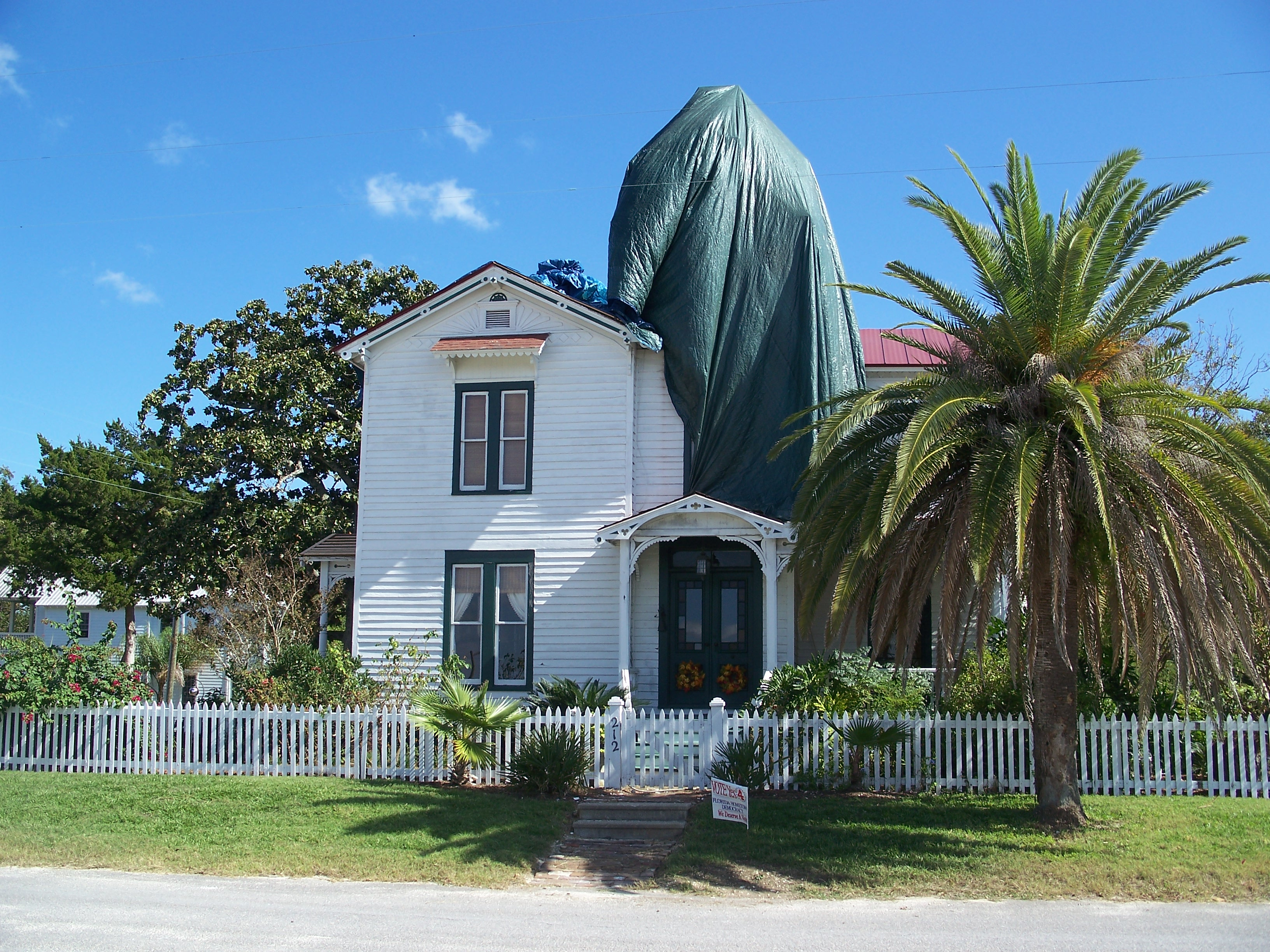
The Villa Villekulla of the film at the Original Town of Fernandina Historic Site, in Fernandina Beach (picture from 2010)

Principal photography began on May 17, 1987, in Fernandina Beach, Florida. During the production, Annakin allowed Erin to improvise much of the dialogue.

The exterior scenes in Villa Villekulla were filmed at the Captain's House, located near Plaza San Carlos. The interior scenes were filmed at the WJCT studios in Jacksonville, Florida.

== Soundtrack ==
Atlantic Records issued the film's motion picture soundtrack upon its release, in both LP and CD formats (LP: 91016–1, CD: 91016–2). It was also issued in Japan by Polydor Records (CD: P32P-20156). The Atlantic LP and CD had 22 tracks, with the score by Misha Segal, and all of the songs. Garrison True provided narration for some of the tracks.

1. "Pippi Longstocking is Coming into Your Town"
2. "The Storm (Lyrics)"
3. "The Gulf Stream"
4. "Ghost of Villa Villekula"
5. "Pippi March"
6. "Scrubbing Day"
7. "War of the Ice Cream"
8. "Beautiful Day at the Villa"
9. "Pastorale"
10. "Runnin' Away"
11. "Runnin' Away (Reprise)"
12. "The Rescue (Lyrics)"
13. "Mama (Lyrics)"
14. "Sticky Situation"
15. "Pippi Saves the Day"
16. "Merry Christmas Tree"
17. "Father's Return"
18. "Kurre Kurre Islands"
19. "Goodbye Papa"
20. "We Live on the Seas"
21. "If You Ever Need Me"
22. "Pippi Longstocking is Coming into Your Town (Reprise)"

== Reception ==
=== Box office ===
The film premiered on March 8, 1988, in Tokyo. It had its North American premiere on July 15, 1988, at the Florida Theatre in Jacksonville and was released nationwide on July 29, earning $933,462 on its opening weekend. It went on to gross $3.6 million in North America – less than half its budget, and became the 136th highest-grossing film of 1988 in the U.S.

=== Critical response ===
Janet Maslin of The New York Times gave a mixed review of the film. She was critical of Tami Erin's acting, the screenplay, and visual effects, but praised Eileen Brennan's acting and Erin's hair design. Richard Harrington, writing for The Washington Post felt that "it's just as hard to imagine Lindgren sending Pippi to Hollywood again anytime in the near future" and criticized the film's subplots. He concluded that "anything that drives kids to reading can't be all bad." People's Peter Travers was critical of the film's storyline, the music, and the acting, saying "If cute could kill, pigtailed Pippi could bring nations to their knees". Todd McCarthy of Variety called it "a picture for the pint-sized crowd only." Although McCarthy praised Pippi's characterization, he found Erin's acting "overbearing" and stated "putting up with her lack of charm for 100 minutes is a tall order. Where's Inger Nilsson when we need her?" However, he praised the performances of Eileen Brennan, Dianne Hull and John Schuck and later stated, "Despite major gaps in some of the staging, [writer/director] Ken Annakin's production is presentable enough for what's needed here."

Johanna Steinmetz of the Chicago Tribune also had mixed feelings. She thought that Erin "seems to embody the relentless good nature, physical agility and spunk necessary for the role", but questioned the film's plot and soundtrack, concluding that it is "a Pippi Longstocking museum rather than a movie, crammed with bits and pieces from a number of [Lindgren's] different books, none of them quite working together". In his 2015 Movie Guide, critic Leonard Maltin found Pippi a "tiresome troublemaker" and stated that the film would likely appeal to "undiscriminating children." However, Candice Russell of the Sun Sentinel gave a positive review of it. Despite her concerns about the scene where Pippi uses Efraim (Schuck)'s pistol to ward off intruders, she praised it for its settings and Erin's acting. She gave it three stars, concluding that Ken Annakin "deserves to be proud of the Disney-esque The New Adventures of Pippi Longstocking".

Creator Astrid Lindgren admitted her disappointment in the film and its production in a 1995 interview, calling it "so so terrible" upon watching it.

On review aggregator Rotten Tomatoes, the film has an approval rating of 17%, based on reviews from 6 critics, with a weighted average score of 4.4/10. The film was nominated for the Golden Raspberry Award for Worst New Star (Tami Erin) and the Golden Raspberry Award Worst Supporting Actress (Eileen Brennan), but lost to Ronald McDonald in Mac and Me and Kristy McNichol in Two Moon Junction respectively at the 9th Golden Raspberry Awards. It was also nominated for Worst Picture at the 1988 Stinkers Bad Movie Awards but lost to Caddyshack II.

=== Legacy ===
Speaking with the Daily Herald, Tami Erin reflected on the film in 2013, saying "Becoming a real movie star in a studio picture gives you sort of an all-access pass to things in life, and I've been really lucky for all the doors that [The New Adventures] has opened for me."

In May 2014, Suzanne Broughton of the Orange County Register included the film in her list of 20 children-friendly films. She said that it "has some hokey moments, but it still delivers the carefree spirit of that little redhead."

=== Home media ===
In North America, the film was first released on VHS on December 15, 1988, by RCA/Columbia Pictures Home Video and again on August 13, 1996, by Columbia TriStar Home Video. An open matte, 1.33:1 aspect ratio DVD was released in the US on April 24, 2001. Only a few region 2 PAL DVDs feature transfers in the film's original widescreen, 1.85:1 theatrical aspect ratio. The film was released on Blu-ray from Sony Pictures Home Entertainment on February 23, 2021, in its original 1.85:1 aspect ratio.
