= Switching Channels =

1988 film by Ted Kotcheff

- Theatrical release poster
- Directed by: Ted Kotcheff
- Written by: Jonathan Reynolds
- Based on: The Front Page by Ben Hecht; Charles MacArthur
- Produced by: Martin Ransohoff
- Starring: Kathleen Turner; Burt Reynolds; Christopher Reeve; Ned Beatty; Henry Gibson
- Cinematography: François Protat
- Edited by: Thom Noble
- Music by: Michel Legrand
- Distributed by: Tri-Star Pictures
- Release date: March 4, 1988
- Running time: 105 minutes
- Country: United States
- Language: English
- Budget: $15 million
- Box office: $9,129,999

Switching Channels is a 1988 American comedy film that is a cable television newsroom-based retelling of newspaper-based 1928 play The Front Page, the 1931 film of the same name and the 1940 film His Girl Friday. It stars Kathleen Turner as Christy Colleran, Burt Reynolds as John L. Sullivan IV, Christopher Reeve as Blaine Bingham, Ned Beatty as Roy Ridnitz, Henry Gibson as Ike Roscoe and George Newbern as Sigenthaler. The film was notorious for its harsh infighting between Reynolds and Turner during filming. The film was a box office failure and received mixed reviews from critics.

== Plot ==
John L. "Sully" Sullivan, IV, is the news director of Satellite News Network (SNN), a Chicago-based TV cable news station. Christy Colleran, his best reporter and ex-wife, goes on vacation, where she falls in love with Blaine Bingham, the owner of a sporting goods company. Christy returns to Chicago with Blaine and meets with Sully, who orders her to attend the execution of convicted murderer Ike Roscoe. Christy announces she is quitting the TV station and marrying Blaine the day after tomorrow in New York City. Not wanting to let Christy leave him, Sully orders his junior reporter Siegenthaler to buy up all available transportation tickets out of town.

During lunch with Christy and Blaine, Sully explains that Roscoe is in prison for killing his son's drug dealer, not realizing that the dealer was an undercover cop. The execution has become a political issue, related to the Democratic primary contest between the Governor and Roy Ridnitz, the State's District Attorney.

Blaine manages to purchase some train tickets to New York. Sully, who has discovered Blaine is afraid of heights, tells Siegenthaler to lure Blaine to a skyscraper. After getting on the glass elevator with Siegenthaler, Blaine has a crippling anxiety attack as the elevator rises and presses on the emergency stop button, trapping both of them there. After the interview with Roscoe, Christy rushes to the building and saves the two men.

The Governor is inundated with calls from citizens asking him to pardon Roscoe. He decides to issue a pardon during the 11:00 pm news. Ridnitz orders the execution moved up to 10:00 pm and invites the media to televise it live. As Ike is strapped into the chair, a power surge occurs and he escapes.

Christy sees Roscoe escaping while riding in a limousine with Blaine on her way out of town. She gets out and tells Blaine she will meet him at the train station. After catching up to Roscoe, Christy tells him to go to the second floor courthouse press room. Christy telephones Sully from the press room and tells him she found Roscoe. After she hangs up, Roscoe hides inside the press room photo copier as other reporters arrive. Ridnitz appears with armed police and announces that Ike was seen on the third floor. After a series of comic escapades, Christy stalls Ridnitz long enough for Ike's pardon to come through. Christy turns on a news camera and tricks Ridnitz into confessing that he wanted Roscoe executed in order to win the election. Sully hands the tape over to Siegenthaler and tells him to run the story.

Blaine graciously steps out of Christy's life, saying that her true loves are the news and Sully. Sully and Christy go to Hawaii for their second honeymoon.

== Cast ==
- Kathleen Turner as Christy Colleran
- Burt Reynolds as John L. "Sully" Sullivan IV
- Christopher Reeve as Blaine Bingham
- Ned Beatty as Roy Ridnitz
- Henry Gibson as Ike Roscoe
- George Newbern as Siegenthaler
- Al Waxman as Berger
- Ken James as Warden Terwilliger
- Barry Flatman as Zaks
- Anthony Sherwood as Carvalho
- Joe Silver as Mordsini
- Charles Kimbrough as Governor
- Allan Royal as Obregon
- Fiona Reid as Pamela Farbrother
- Bill Randolph as Eric
- Laura M. Robinson as Karen Ludlow
- Tony Rosato as "Joker"
- Jackie Richardson as Abigail
- Rex Hagon as Reporter
- Philip Akin as Guard
- Jonathan Welsh as Chaplain
- Corrine Koslo as Yvonne
- Judah Katz as Sound Man
- Jason Blicker as Sound Man
- Jack Duffy as Emil

== Production ==
The male lead John "Sully" Sullivan was meant to be played by Michael Caine but he was delayed filming Jaws: The Revenge. Burt Reynolds was cast instead. Reynolds recalled:

I wasn't doing anything other than sitting around mulling over the lint in my belly button... I've always been a great fan of Ted Kotcheff—I really liked North Dallas Forty—and I loved the period of films, the thirties and the forties, The Front Page comes out of. I hope Cary Grant, whom I knew and admired, won't be whirling in his grave over what we've done. But we're keeping it fast and talky: some scenes are eight pages of dialogue.

=== Turner-Reynolds Feuding ===
Kathleen Turner and Burt Reynolds had a very strained working relationship on set, and both commented negatively on one another in the years after.

In 2018, Kathleen Turner said the following of her experience working with Burt Reynolds on Switching Channels:

Working with Burt Reynolds was terrible. The first day Burt came in he made me cry. He said something about not taking second place to a woman. His behavior was shocking. It never occurred to me that I wasn’t someone’s equal. I left the room sobbing. I called my husband and said, "I don't know what to do." He said, "You just do the job." It got to be very hostile because the crew began taking sides. But as for the performance, I was able to put the negativity aside. I'm not convinced Burt was.

In March 2018, when Reynolds was asked by Andy Cohen who the most overrated actor of the 1970s and 1980s was, he cited Turner.

== Reception ==
=== Critical response ===
Siskel and Ebert on At the Movies gave Switching Channels mixed results: Roger Ebert was positive about the film and liked how the film did overall; however, Gene Siskel expressed strong disappointment in the film and gave Switching Channels a thumbs down. Rotten Tomatoes currently lists Switching Channels with a 60% rating based on 15 reviews.

Christopher Reeve, who played against type as the hapless fiancé Blaine Bingham, later expressed regret in making the film, believing he "made a fool of himself" and that he had taken the project as a distraction from depression following his breakup with Gae Exton. He also reportedly had to act as "referee", as costars Turner and Reynolds feuded with each other during filming. According to his autobiography Still Me, one of the main reasons he took the role was because Michael Caine was originally lined up to play Sullivan, and he had enjoyed working with Caine six years earlier in Deathtrap. Another scene Reeve disliked was the one in which his character suffers acrophobia in a glass elevator, a likely spoof of Reeve's best known role as Superman.

The film was nominated for two Golden Raspberry Awards: Burt Reynolds was nominated for Worst Actor for this film and Rent-a-Cop and Christopher Reeve for Worst Supporting Actor. However, they respectively "lost" to Sylvester Stallone for Rambo III and Dan Aykroyd for Caddyshack II at the 9th Golden Raspberry Awards.

== Home media ==
The film is available on DVD in Regions 2 and 4. It is also available as a burn-on-demand DVD-R in Region 1.
