= Hot to Trot =

1988 film by Michael Dinner

- Theatrical release poster
- Directed by: Michael Dinner
- Screenplay by: Hugo Gilbert; Stephen Neigher; Charlie Peters
- Story by: Hugo Gilbert; Stephen Neigher
- Produced by: Steve Tisch; Wendy Finerman
- Starring: Bob Goldthwait; Virginia Madsen; Jim Metzler; Gilbert Gottfried; Dabney Coleman; John Candy
- Cinematography: Victor J. Kemper
- Edited by: Frank Morriss; Dallas Puett
- Music by: Danny Elfman
- Distributed by: Warner Bros.
- Release date: August 26, 1988
- Running time: 83 minutes
- Country: United States
- Language: English
- Budget: $9 million
- Box office: $6.4 million

Hot to Trot is a 1988 American comedy film directed by Michael Dinner, written by Hugo Gilbert, Stephen Neigher, Charlie Peters and Andy Breckman and starring Bobcat Goldthwait (credited as Bob Goldthwait), Virginia Madsen, Jim Metzler, Dabney Coleman and the voice of John Candy. It follows Fred Chaney, an investment broker who teams up with Don, a talking horse who helps him make smart investment tips.

The film was a critical and commercial failure, grossing only $6 million from an estimated $9 million budget, and receiving five Golden Raspberry Awards nominations, including Worst Picture.

== Plot ==
Simpleton bachelor Fred Chaney inherits a buck-toothed horse named Don and one half of a stock brokerage firm from his dead mother. He discovers Don is a talking horse (who can also speak the language of several other animals) that belonged to his deceased father. His stepfather Walter Sawyer offers to buy out Chaney's share of the business for a paltry sum, but Chaney refuses.

Instead, Chaney returns Don to his talking horse family in the countryside and claims his place as partner at the firm. Chaney takes over an office and begins working as a broker, much to the chagrin of Sawyer. Don the horse overhears a stock tip and calls Chaney, presumably using his teeth to dial the phone. Chaney acts on the investment advice and becomes wealthy overnight.

Chaney rents a fancy penthouse apartment and buys a sports car. Don the horse returns to the city and feigns illness. Chaney feels sorry for him and the two become roommates in the apartment. Don's father dies, but not before impressing upon Don the importance of producing an heir to the 'chosen' line of talking horses. Conveniently, Don meets a beautiful white horse named Satin Doll at the stables soon after and develops a crush on the mare. Inconveniently, Satin Doll is a recent gift from Sawyer to his girlfriend Victoria Peyton.

Chaney's successes continue, and Sawyer asks his secretary Allison Rowe to find out Cheney's secrets. She and Cheney go on an awkward date where a smitten Cheney naively reveals that Don is the source of his investing prowess. She assumes he is being facetious. Cheney insists Don can speak and returns to his apartment with her. Don refuses to talk.

Don throws a wild party at the apartment with several species of animals in attendance; the apartment is damaged. Chaney becomes angry with Don and their relationship begins to sour. After eating delicious oats, Don suggests Chaney buy stock in the company. Despite being upset, Chaney takes Don's advice once again. The stock tip is a bust, the oats are contaminated, and Don becomes ill. Sawyer learns of the oat company's impending collapse before Chaney and locks Chaney in the office bathroom before he can unload the doomed stock. Chaney is financially devastated.

Allison learns of Sawyer's actions and quits her job in protest. As she leaves the office, Don speaks to her for the first time. Realizing Chaney was telling the truth about Don, Allison transports the horse to reunite with Chaney. The three work together to get revenge on Sawyer. The plan is to enter Don in a horse race against Sawyer. Chaney goads an arrogant Sawyer into betting his horses against Don.

Victory will win Cheney all of Sawyer's prized equines, including Don's love interest Satin Doll. Unable to find an adequate jockey, Don (having entered the race from the "Pepperidge Farm" Stables) will be ridden by an inexperienced Chaney. While having second thoughts the night before the race, Don is visited by his father who has been reincarnated as a horse fly.

Despite informing Don that "it sucks" being in his new form, Don's father delivers a rousing pep talk and Don's confidence is restored. Don is slow out of the gate but miraculously catches up to his competitors. He then fast-talks all but one of the other horses into abandoning the race through a series of ruses.

The exhausted Don now trails a final challenger named Lord Kensington, the horse of Sawyer. Chaney struggles to motivate Don to overtake the leader. Finally, Chaney's promise of getting Don's teeth cosmetically capped spurs extra speed out of the horse and Don wins in a photo finish. The judges note that Don stuck his teeth out over the finish line to come in first.

Sawyer is humiliated. As winners, both Don and Chaney "get the girl" (Satin Doll and Allison) and the film finishes happily with Don getting his teeth capped and closing the film by saying Porky Pig's catchphrase "That's all folks".

== Cast ==
- Bobcat Goldthwait as Fred P. Chaney
- Dabney Coleman as Walter Sawyer
- John Candy as Don (voice)
- Virginia Madsen as Allison Rowe
- Cindy Pickett as Victoria Peyton
- Jim Metzler as Boyd Osborne
- Tim Kazurinsky as Leonard
- Barbara Whinnery as Denise
- Mary Gross as Ms. French
- Liz Torres as Bea
- Jocko Marcellino as Marvin
- Deanna Oliver as Lorraine
- Lonny Price as Frank
- Chino 'Fats' Williams as Messenger
- Ángel Salazar as Snake
- Jack Whitaker as Himself
- Frank Morriss as Announcer
- Gilbert Gottfried as Dentist
- Dennis Tufano as Party Person
- James Hong as Boss
- Vyto Ruginis as Mr. Pandolfi
- Robert Towers as Clerk
- Estelle Reiner as Mrs. Goldblatt
- Peter Hobbs as Veterinarian
- George D. Wallace as Orson
- Buck Henry as Mr. Cheney (uncredited)
- Burgess Meredith as Don's Dad (uncredited)

== Production ==
After the success of Pee-wee's Big Adventure, Warner Bros. Pictures offered the film to Tim Burton, who turned it down. In an interview in 2011, Bobcat Goldthwait said that he got the script for Hot to Trot and wrote "Why would I do this?" on the cover, to which his manager responded by writing a dollar sign.

The original cast for the film included Joan Rivers in Goldthwait's role Fred Chaney. Elliott Gould was the original voice of Don the horse. After a poor test screening of the film, Don's half of the script was rewritten by future Monk creator and executive producer Andy Breckman in an effort to make the film funnier.

John Candy was hired to re-record Don's voice; he ignored the new script and improvised the dialogue instead. Originally scheduled for theatrical release in the fall of 1987, Warner Bros. pushed it back to Memorial Day weekend 1988, as a result of the poor test screenings, before ultimately opening it on August 26, 1988, over a year after filming was completed.

The film was released on VHS in 1989, followed by a reissue in 1991, then another in 1998 as part of the "Warner Bros. Hits" collection. It is available on DVD as a manufactured on demand release through the Warner Archive Collection.

== Reception ==
The film was a box-office bomb. On review aggregator Rotten Tomatoes, the film has a 0% approval rating based on 16 reviews. On Metacritic, the film has a score of 22 out of 100 based on 7 critics, indicating "generally unfavorable" reviews. It was nominated for five Golden Raspberry Awards including Worst Picture (which lost to Cocktail), Worst Actor (Goldthwait; who lost to Sylvester Stallone for Rambo III), Worst Director (Michael Dinner; who lost to both Blake Edwards for Sunset and Stewart Raffill for Mac and Me in a tie), Worst Screenplay (also lost to Cocktail) and Worst New Star (Don the talking horse; who lost to Ronald McDonald for his cameo in Mac and Me) at the 9th Golden Raspberry Awards.

Marketing for the film featured newspaper advertisements with a promotional 1-800 number, that when called contained a several minute recorded message from John Candy (as Don the Talking Horse) telling jokes, and talking a bit about the film, including the line "Hi! I'm Don the Talking Horse! First, how's about a couple of jokes?"

Gene Siskel numbered it among the worst films of 1988, calling the film "a stunningly unfunny film about a talking horse and – what's worse – a talking man".

== See also ==
- List of films about horses
- List of films about horse racing
- Bojack Horseman
