= 9th Golden Raspberry Awards =

Award for worst cinematic under-achievements in 1988

- Date: March 29, 1989
- Site: Hollywood Palace, Los Angeles, California

Highlights
- Worst Picture: Cocktail
- Most awards: Caddyshack II, Cocktail and Mac and Me (2)
- Most nominations: Hot to Trot and Rambo III (5)

The 9th Golden Raspberry Awards were held on March 29, 1989, at the Hollywood Palace to recognize the worst the movie industry had to offer in 1988.

== Awards and nominations ==
Winner (in bold)
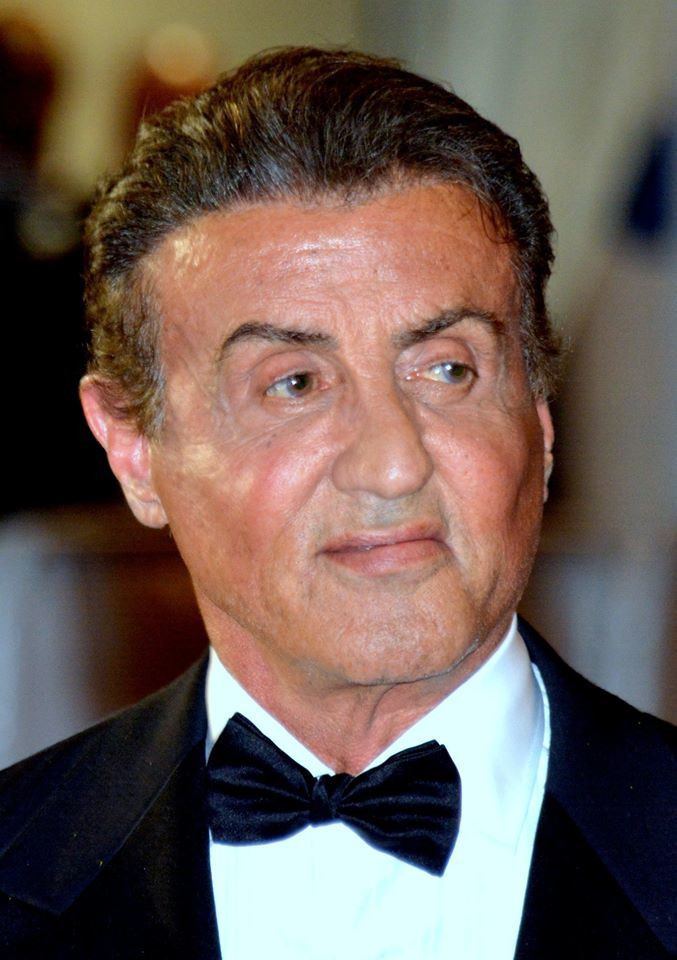
Sylvester Stallone, Worst Actor winner

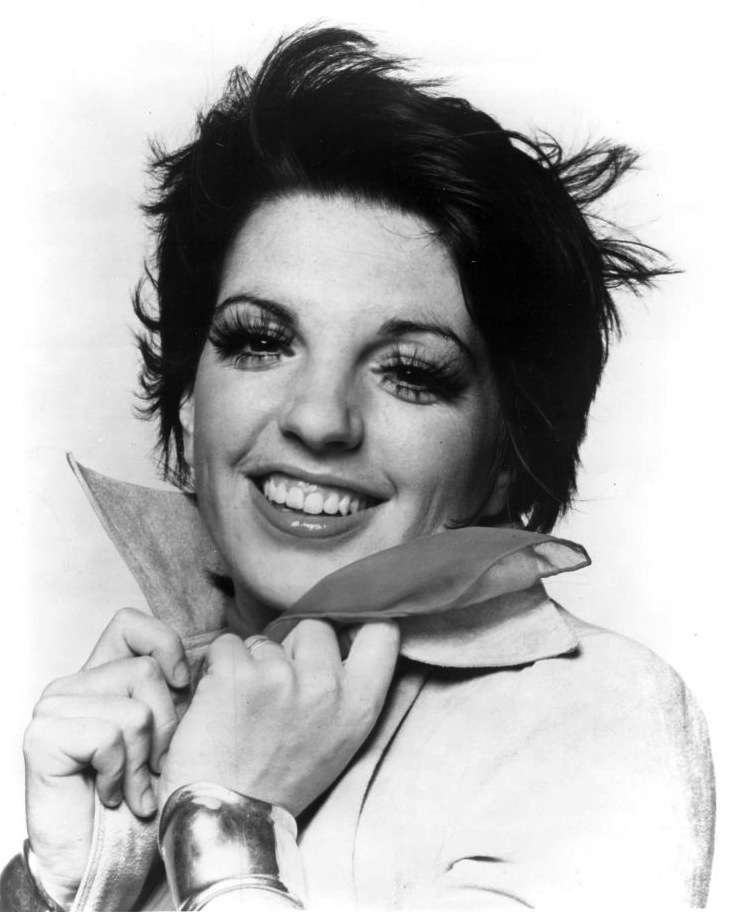
Liza Minnelli, Worst Actress winner

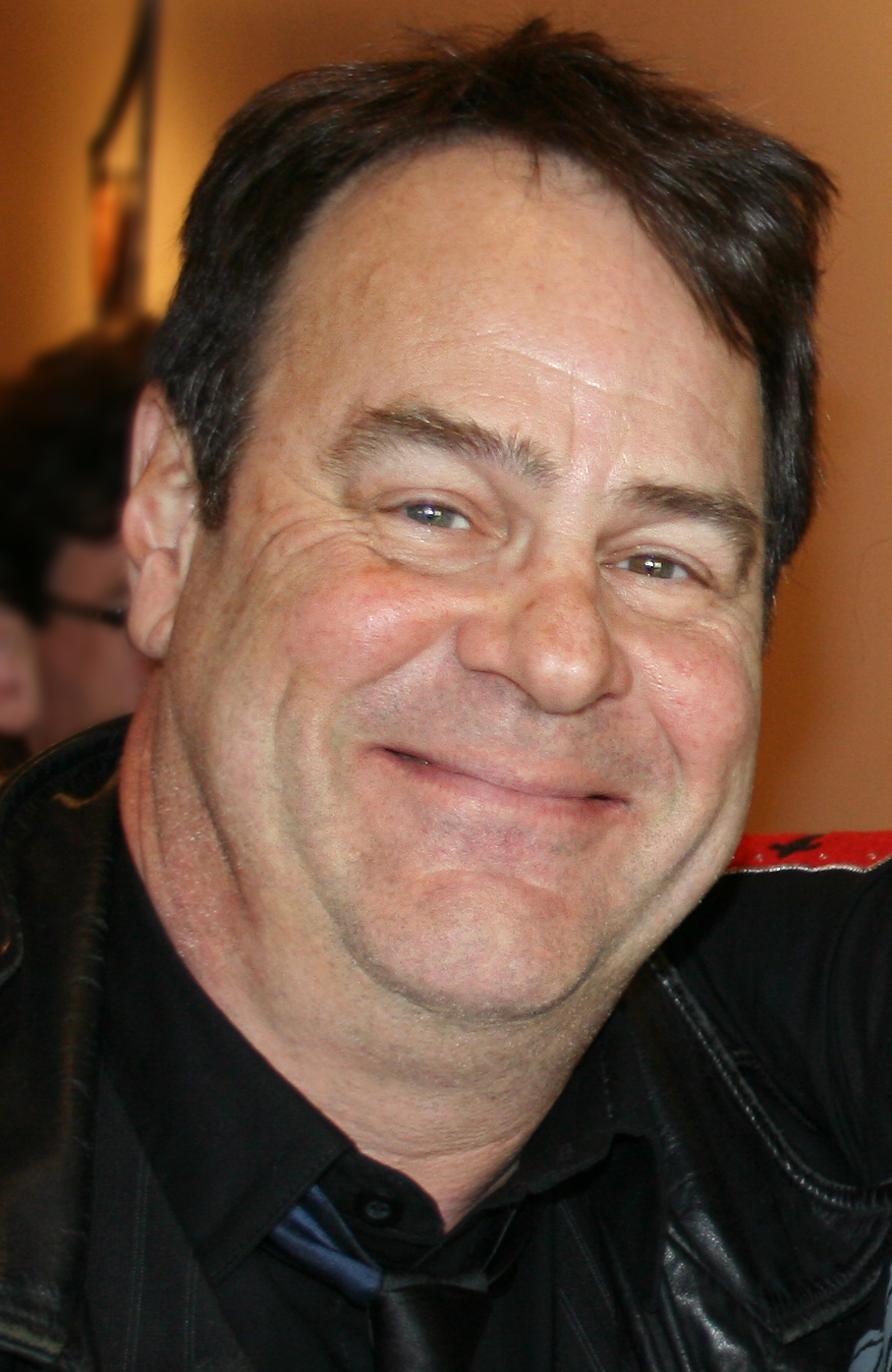
Dan Aykroyd, Worst Supporting Actor winner

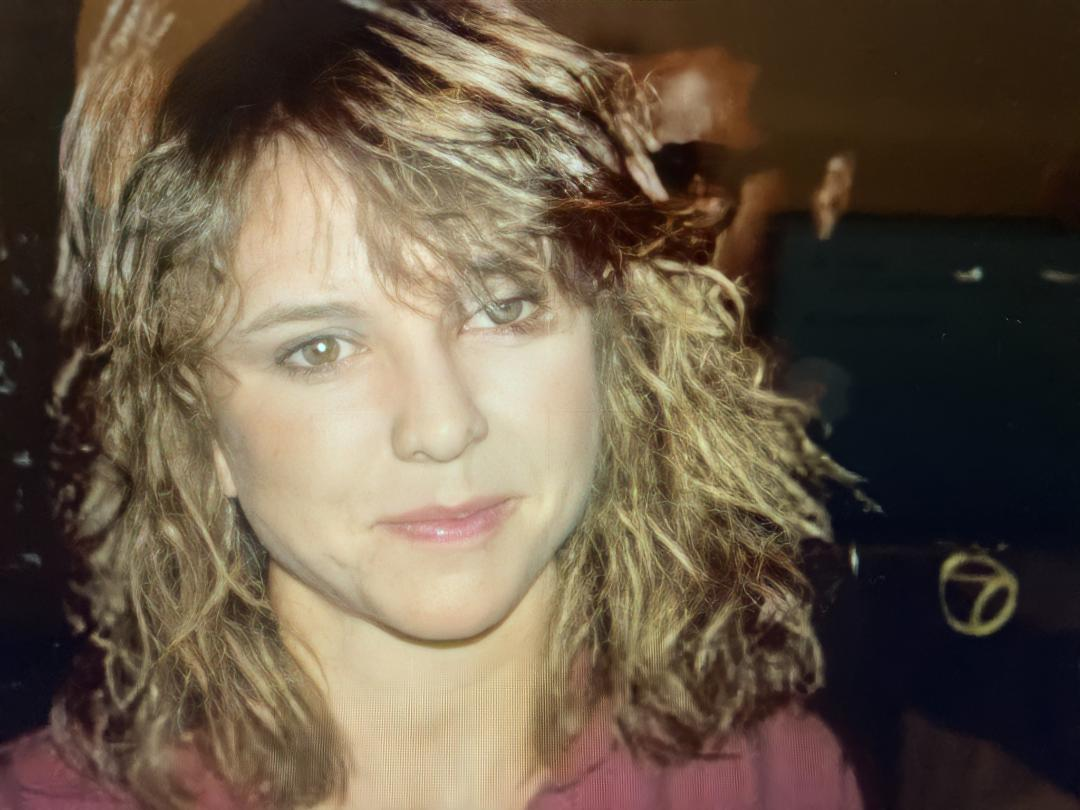
Kristy McNichol, Worst Supporting Actress winner

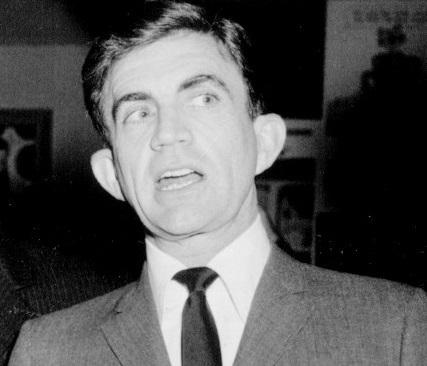
Blake Edwards, Worst Director co-winner

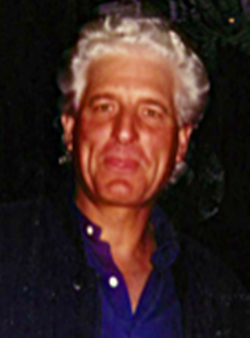
Stewart Raffill, Worst Director co-winner

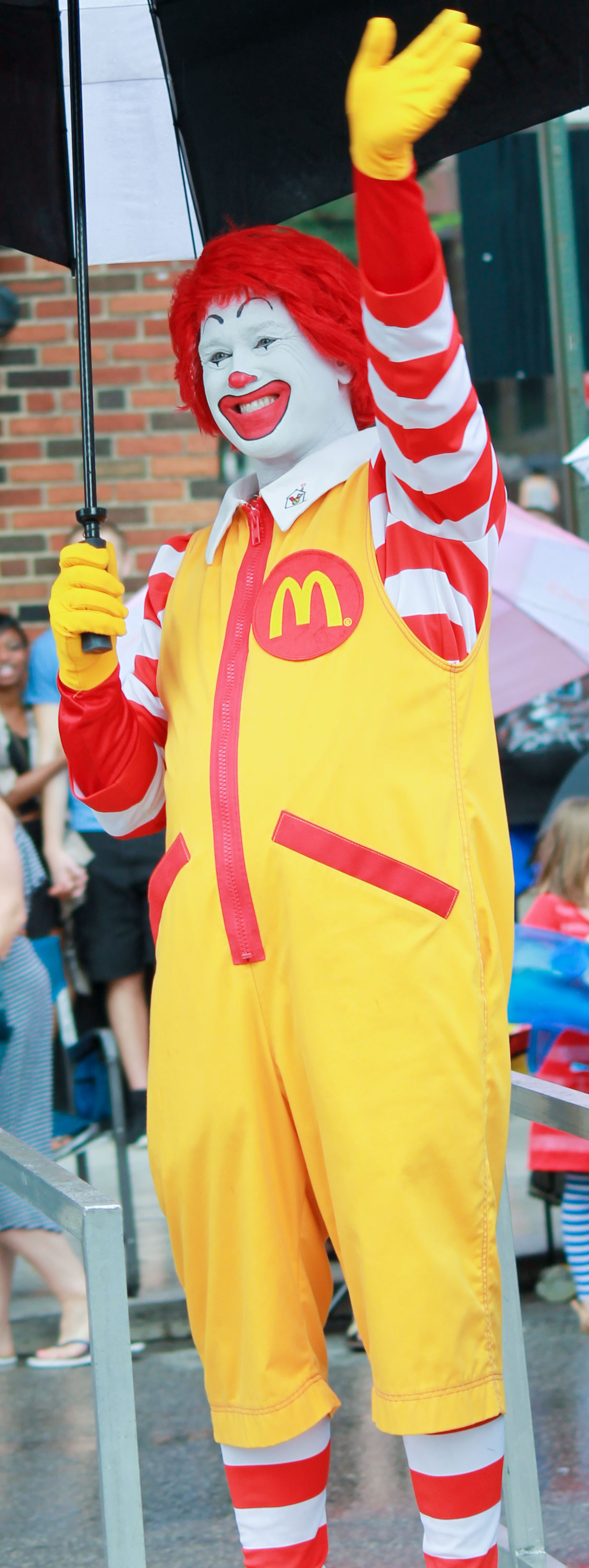
Ronald McDonald, Worst New Star winner

Category	Recipient
Worst Picture	**Cocktail (Touchstone)**
Worst Picture	Caddyshack II (Warner Bros.)
Worst Picture	Hot to Trot (Warner Bros.)
Worst Picture	Mac and Me (Orion)
Worst Picture	Rambo III (TriStar)
Worst Actor	**Sylvester Stallone in Rambo III as John Rambo**
Worst Actor	Tom Cruise in Cocktail as Brian Flanagan
Worst Actor	Bobcat Goldthwait in Hot to Trot as Fred Chaney
Worst Actor	Jackie Mason in Caddyshack II as Jack Hartounian
Worst Actor	Burt Reynolds in Rent-a-Cop and Switching Channels as Tony Church and John L. Sullivan IV (respectively)
Worst Actress	**Liza Minnelli in Arthur 2: On the Rocks and Rent-a-Cop as Linda Marolla Bach and Della Roberts (respectively)**
Worst Actress	Rebecca De Mornay in And God Created Woman as Robin Shea
Worst Actress	Whoopi Goldberg in The Telephone as Vashti Blue
Worst Actress	Cassandra Peterson in Elvira: Mistress of the Dark as Elvira
Worst Actress	Vanity in Action Jackson as Sydney Ash
Worst Supporting Actor	**Dan Aykroyd in Caddyshack II as Captain Tom Everett**
Worst Supporting Actor	Billy Barty in Willow as The High Aldwin
Worst Supporting Actor	Richard Crenna in Rambo III as Colonel Sam Trautman
Worst Supporting Actor	Harvey Keitel in The Last Temptation of Christ as Judas Iscariot
Worst Supporting Actor	Christopher Reeve in Switching Channels as Blaine Bingham
Worst Supporting Actress	**Kristy McNichol in Two Moon Junction as Patti Jean**
Worst Supporting Actress	Eileen Brennan in The New Adventures of Pippi Longstocking as Miss Bannister
Worst Supporting Actress	Daryl Hannah in High Spirits as Mary Plunkett Brogan
Worst Supporting Actress	Mariel Hemingway in Sunset as Cheryl King
Worst Supporting Actress	Zelda Rubinstein in Poltergeist III as Tangina Barrons
Worst Director	**Blake Edwards for Sunset (TIE)**
Worst Director	**Stewart Raffill for Mac and Me (TIE)**
Worst Director	Michael Dinner for Hot to Trot
Worst Director	Roger Donaldson for Cocktail
Worst Director	Peter MacDonald for Rambo III
Worst Screenplay	**Cocktail, screenplay by Heywood Gould, based on his book**
Worst Screenplay	Hot to Trot, screenplay by Steven Neigher & Hugo Gilbert and Charlie Peters, story by Neigher & Gilbert
Worst Screenplay	Mac and Me, written by Stewart Raffill and Steve Feke
Worst Screenplay	Rambo III, written by Sylvester Stallone and Sheldon Lettich, based on characters created by David Morrell
Worst Screenplay	Willow, screenplay by Bob Dolman, story by George Lucas
Worst New Star	**Ronald McDonald (as himself) in Mac and Me**
Worst New Star	Don (the talking horse) in Hot to Trot
Worst New Star	Tami Erin in The New Adventures of Pippi Longstocking as Pippi Longstocking
Worst New Star	Robi Rosa in Salsa as Rico
Worst New Star	Jean-Claude Van Damme in Bloodsport as Frank Dux
Worst Original Song	**"Jack Fresh" from Caddyshack II, written and performed by Full Force**
Worst Original Song	"Skintight" from Johnny Be Good, written and performed by Ted Nugent
Worst Original Song	"Therapist" from A Nightmare on Elm Street 4: The Dream Master, written and performed by Vigil

== Films with multiple nominations ==
These films received multiple nominations:

Nominations	Films
5	Hot to Trot
5	Rambo III
4	Caddyshack II
4	Cocktail
4	Mac and Me
2	The New Adventures of Pippi Longstocking
2	Rent-a-Cop
2	Sunset
2	Switching Channels
2	Willow

== See also ==
- 1988 in film
- 61st Academy Awards
- 42nd British Academy Film Awards
- 46th Golden Globe Awards
