= Christopher Murray (actor) =

American actor

- Born: March 19, 1957 (age 69); Los Angeles, California, U.S.
- Occupation: Actor
- Years active: 1976–present
- Parents: Don Murray (father); Hope Lange (mother)
- Relatives: Alan J. Pakula (stepfather)

Christopher Murray (born March 19, 1957) is an American actor. He is the son of actors Don Murray and Hope Lange, as well as the stepson of film director Alan J. Pakula, Lange's second husband.

== Career ==
Murray appeared in a number of notable films, beginning with Pakula's 1976 film All the President's Men. He appeared in two other films directed by Pakula, See You in the Morning (1989) and The Pelican Brief (1993). He has also appeared in the films I Am the Cheese (1983), And God Created Woman (1988), Just Cause and Virtuosity (both 1995), Dante's Peak (1997), and Alien Night Shift (2019).

He has also guest starred in a number of notable television series that include, Knots Landing, China Beach, L.A. Law, Murder, She Wrote, JAG, NCIS, Beverly Hills, 90210, The West Wing, 24, 7th Heaven, Crossing Jordan, Parks and Recreation, Beyond Belief: Fact or Fiction and Mad Men. From 2005 to 2008, Murray had a recurring role as Dean Rivers on the Nickelodeon series Zoey 101, appearing on the show throughout its four-season run.

== Filmography ==
=== Film ===
Year	Title	Role	Notes
1976	All the President's Men	Photo Aide	
1983	I Am the Cheese	Eric Peterson	
1988	And God Created Woman	Harold	
1989	See You in the Morning	Group Therapy Patient	
1991	The Flash II: Revenge of the Trickster	Williams	
1993	The Pelican Brief	Rupert	
1993	Fatal Instinct	Investigator #1	Uncredited
1993	Spree	Walt	
1994	Clifford	Bartender	
1994	The Cowboy Way	Water Cop	
1995	Just Cause	Detective T.J. Wilcox	
1995	Virtuosity	Matthew Grimes	
1997	Dante's Peak	Pilot	
1999	Nice Guys Sleep Alone	Robert	
2003	The Commission	Agent Cortlandt Cunningham	
2003	Leprechaun: Back 2 tha Hood	Whitaker	
2005	The Man	Homeless Man	
2006	Smokin' Aces	Sergeant / Chief	
2007	Chris & Don	—N/a	Documentary
2009	Crossing Over	Special Agent Ludwig	
2013	Clubhouse	Clarke Wilcox	
2013	Never the Same: The Prisoner-of-War Experience	Cecil Peart	Documentary
2018	The Final Wish	Yates	
2019	Alien Night Shift	Springer	Short film
2020	The 11th Green	Robert Cutler	
2020	Proximity	Quaid Ottinger	

=== Television ===
Year	Title	Role	Notes
1980	Knots Landing	Les	Episode: "Home is for Healing"
1980	The Doctors	Ed	
1981	Family Reunion	Arthur Lyman	Television film
1981	The Patricia Neal Story	Rod	Television film
1984	Mister Roberts	Shore Patrolman	Television film
1985	Our Family Honor	Television reporter	Episode: "Pilot"
1985	Misfits of Science	Syl	Episode: "Sort of Looking for Gina"
1987	Scarecrow and Mrs. King	Comancho	Episode: "Promises to Keep"
1987–1989	Days of Our Lives	Art / Ben	8 episodes
1990	General Hospital	Lt. Smith	Episode dated 1 June 1990
1990	China Beach	Navy Surgeon	Episode: "One Small Step"
1990, 1991	The Flash	Williams / Highway Patrolman	2 episodes
1992	She Woke Up	Reporter #1	Television film
1992	Grass Roots	Buchanan	Television film
1993	Murder, She Wrote	Phil Coile	Episode: "Love's Deadly Desire"
1994	Hart to Hart: Crimes of the Hart	Mike Royston	Television film
1995	Courthouse	Detective Eric Ford	Episode: "Injustice for All"
1996	JAG	Colonel Gordon	Episode: "High Ground"
1996	Norma Jean & Marilyn	Erwin "Doc" Goddard	Television film
1998	Michael Hayes	Special Agent Rick Flowers	Episode: "Gotterdammerung"
1998	Route 9	Cowboy	Television film
1998	Buddy Faro	Emmit Kornhaven	Episode: "Call Me Cody Smith"
1999	Beverly Hills, 90210	Dylan's Boss	Episode: "I'm Married"
1999	Beyond Belief: Fact or Fiction	Detective Bill Ballard	Episode: "The Bloody Hand"
1999	Profiler	Tom	Episode: "Old Ghosts"
2001	The West Wing	Tony Phillips	Episode: "Two Cathedrals"
2001, 2003	7th Heaven	Fire Chief Bill / Officer #1	2 episodes
2002	24	Dockerty	Episode: "Day 2: 2:00 p.m.-3:00 p.m."
2002	The Agency	Inspector David Brennan	Episode: "Elite Meat to Eat"
2003	Hunter	Blackie Tulanian	Episode: "Vaya Sin Dios"
2004	Crossing Jordan	Uniformed Officer	Episode: "Devil May Care"
2004	A Place Called Home	Sheriff	Television film
2005–2007	Zoey 101	Dean Rivers	17 episodes
2007	Sacrifices of the Heart	Kevin Doyle	Television film
2008	Mad Men	Phil Mathewson	Episode: "A Night to Remember"
2008	Generation Gap	Sheriff Brown	Television film
2009	Saving Grace	Leroy Johnson	Episode: "Am I Going to Lose Her?"
2010	Parks and Recreation	Nick Newport Sr.	2 episodes
2012	Touch	Montreal Doctor	Episode: "Entanglement"
2014	Scandal	Dr. Murray Levine	Episode: "We Do Not Touch the First Ladies"
2015	NCIS	Joseph Mallard	Episode: "Spinning Wheel"
2016	Castle	Mr. Geoffrey Northcliff	Episode: "The Blame Game"
2016	Aquarius	Captain Perry	5 episodes
2017	Twin Peaks	Officer Olson	Episode: "Part 1"
2018	Bosch	Allen Tuckfeld	Episode: "Missed Connections"
2018	The Rookie	Old Cop	Episode: "The Hawke"
2019	American Horror Story: 1984	Sheriff	Episode: "Mr. Jingles"
2019	Adam Ruins Everything	Rusty Butz	Episode: "Adam Ruins a Plate of Nachos"
2021	Them	Murray	Episode: "Covenant I."
2021	Nova Vita	Judge Putnam	10 episodes
