= Alien Night Shift =

2019 American short film

- Directed by: Aidan Brezonick
- Written by: Aidan Brezonick
- Based on: Alien by: Dan O'Bannon; Ronald Shusett
- Produced by: C.M. Birkmeier; Andrew Cummings; Allison Duda; Quaid Kocur
- Starring: Amber Gaston; Terrance Keith Richardson; Christopher Murray; Tanner Rittenhouse
- Cinematography: Dustin Supencheck
- Edited by: Niles Howard
- Music by: François Liétout
- Production companies: Tongal Studios; 20th Century Fox
- Distributed by: IGN; 20th Century Fox
- Release dates: April 12, 2019 (IGN); May 3, 2019 (Fox); November 24, 2020 (director's cut)
- Running time: 9 minutes 12 minutes (director's cut)
- Country: United States
- Budget: $35,000

Alien Night Shift is a short film based on the science fiction action media franchise Alien. Released via IGN on April 12, 2019, coinciding with the 40th anniversary of the franchise, the film was written and directed by Aidan Brezonick, through Tongal Studios and 20th Century Fox. Starring Amber Gaston, Terrance Keith Richardson, Christopher Murray, and Tanner Rittenhouse, the film follows the residents of the mining colony as they find themselves in the midst of a xenomorph outbreak. (Note: In the original version of Alien Night Shift released in 2019, the film is established to be set at the High Lonesome mining colony on LV-422, while in the director's cut released in 2020, the film is retconned as having been set at Hadley's Hope mining colony on Acheron (LV-426), during the events of Aliens (1986) and Alien: River of Pain (2014), in the year 2179.)

The eighteenth short film in the Alien franchise, it received a mixed to positive critical reception, with a director's cut then released on November 24, 2020.

== Plot ==
One night at a colony, Captain Welles finds his friend Harper slumped over in an alleyway. Believing him to be hungover on having skipped work (oblivious to the dead facehugger nearby), Welles offers him another drink to make him feel better before bringing him to the colony's storeroom to get some before they depart the colony, where they are let in by baseball enthusiasts Rolly and Springer. While Harper enters the bathroom to throw up, Rolly wonders whether Welles has any openings to leave LV-422. As the two argue with Springer over Welles attempting to take more alcohol than permitted, the trio are surprised by Harper staggering out of the bathroom before a chestbuster bursts from his chest; attempting to kill the alien, Welles accidentally kills Springer and cuts out the electricity, before fleeing in search of help. Picking up a baseball bat, Rolly tracks down the chestburster and beats it to death, before being interrupted by the colony's emergency klaxon, hearing the sounds of full-sized xenomorph drones over her radio, indicating similar outbreaks to have occurred all across the colony.

In the director's cut, having survived the outbreak on fleeing via his ship, Captain Welles is interrogated by Weyland-Yutani operatives over what happened during the outbreak, who link the incident to "that Nostromo mess", (Note: As depicted in Alien (1979).) before offering Welles a payoff not to speak about what he witnessed again.

== Cast ==
- Amber Gaston as Rolly
- Terrance Keith Richardson as Captain Welles
- Christopher Murray as Springer
- Tanner Rittenhouse as Harper

In the director's cut, two uncredited actors play Weyland-Yutani employees.

== Production ==
In July 2018, it was reported that 20th Century Fox had joined forces with Tongal Studios to produce a series of Alien short films to coincide with the 40th anniversary of the franchise. By March 2019, the details of the short films were released, Tongal co-founder and CEO James DeJulio describing the joint-production as "reflective of Tongal's mission to bring creative opportunities to the next generation of talent." The third short released and the eighteenth overall in the franchise, Alien: Night Shift was written and directed by Aidan Brezonick, filmed in a bunker in Los Angeles, with a "slow burn" tone leading to a "ticking time bomb setup". with a budget of $35,000.

== Release ==
Alien Night Shift was released on the IGN website on April 12, 2019, after which it was uploaded to the Alien Universe website, and all Alien social media pages on May 5, 2019, the short film then premiering alongside five others at the Emerald City Comic Con in Seattle, and as a Movies Anywhere-exclusive bonus feature accompanying the digital release of Alien. A director's cut, featuring a new frame story, was released on November 24, 2020.

== Reception ==
Alien Night Shift received a mixed to positive critical reception. Vijay Varman of Circle of Cinema praised the film for its "astoundingly lit opening shot" while criticising the "meandering" first act and "weak" character fronts, lauding the "commendable" acting performance of Terrance Keith Richardson. Eric Li of The Scariest Things also praised the "straightforward" plot structure and "fantastically shot" opening scene, noting its depicting of chestbursting as having "all the right feels", while criticising the editing for its "jarring transitions", concluding to praise it as "look[ing] like it was part of a bigger budgeted movie [one would] want to see [be] extended".
