= Portrait of a Hitman =

1979 film directed by Allan A. Buckhantz

- U.K. DVD cover
- Directed by: Allan A. Buckhantz
- Screenplay by: Yabo Yablonsky
- Produced by: Andrzej Krakowski; James R. Rokos
- Starring: Jack Palance; Rod Steiger; Bo Svenson; Ann Turkel; Richard Roundtree
- Cinematography: Charles Correll
- Edited by: George Folsey Jr.; Ned Humphreys; Robert K. Lambert; Michael Ripps
- Music by: Laurence Rosenthal
- Production company: Wildfire Productions
- Distributed by: American National Enterprises (U.S.)
- Release dates: January 10, 1979 (France); January 1, 1984 (U.S.)
- Running time: 86 minutes
- Country: United States
- Language: English

Portrait of a Hitman is a 1979 American neo-noir crime film directed by Allan A. Buckhantz and starring Jack Palance, Rod Steiger, Bo Svenson, Ann Turkel, Richard Roundtree, and Philip Ahn in his final film role.

== Plot summary ==
A ruthless professional contract killer is ordered to kill a brain surgeon. Later, it turns out, however, that both men not only know each other very well (the surgeon once saved the hitman's life) but also love the same woman.

== Cast ==
- Jack Palance as Jim Buck
- Rod Steiger as Max Andreotti
- Richard Roundtree as Coco Morrell
- Bo Svenson as Dr. Bob Michaels
- Ann Turkel as Cathy
- Philip Ahn as Wong
- Herb Jeffries as Charlie Blue
- Conrad Bachmann as George
- John Dresden as Volsted
- Ed Ness as Capt. Ned
- Garrison True as Joe
- Carla Haley as Della

== Release ==
The film premiered in France in 1979. It did not see a release in the United States until 1984, when it was released direct-to-video. It was released on DVD in 2002 and 2006.
