= Hope Lange =

American actress (1933–2003)

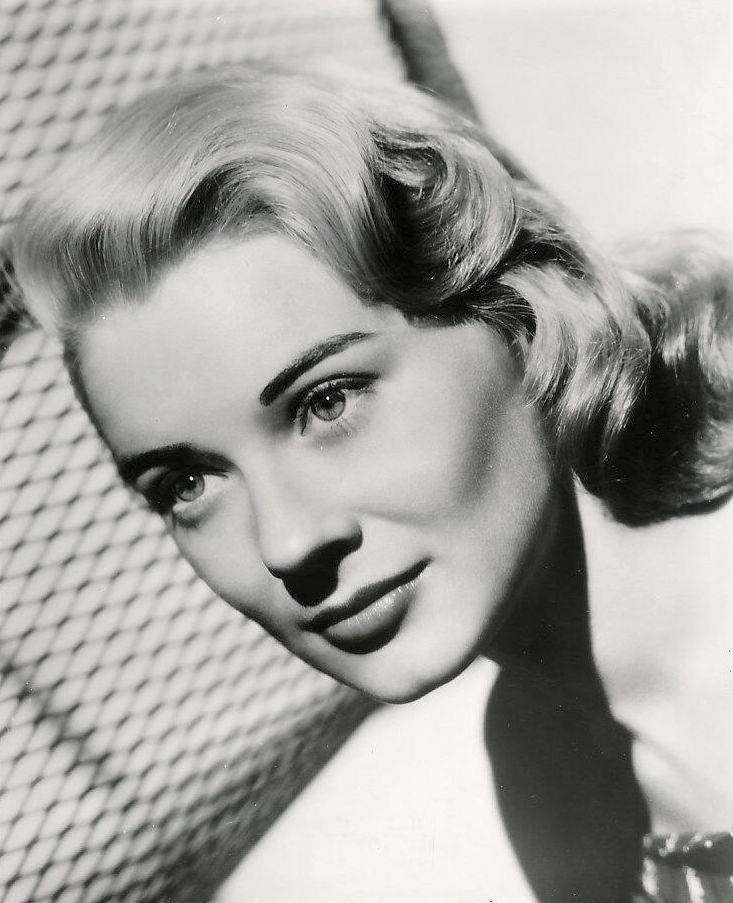
- Lange in 1957
- Born: Hope Elise Ross Lange; November 28, 1933; Redding, Connecticut, U.S.
- Died: December 19, 2003 (aged 70); Santa Monica, California, U.S.
- Education: Reed College
- Occupation: Actress
- Years active: 1942–1998
- Spouses: Don Murray (m. 1956; div. 1961) Alan J. Pakula (m. 1963; div. 1971) Charles Hollerith, Jr. (m. 1986)
- Children: 2, including Christopher Murray

Hope Elise Ross Lange (November 28, 1933 – December 19, 2003) was an American film, stage, and television actress. She was nominated for the Golden Globe Award for Best Supporting Actress and the Academy Award for Best Supporting Actress for her portrayal of Selena Cross in the 1957 film Peyton Place. In 1969 and 1970, she twice won the Primetime Emmy Award for Outstanding Lead Actress in a Comedy Series for her role as Carolyn Muir in the sitcom The Ghost & Mrs. Muir.

== Early life ==
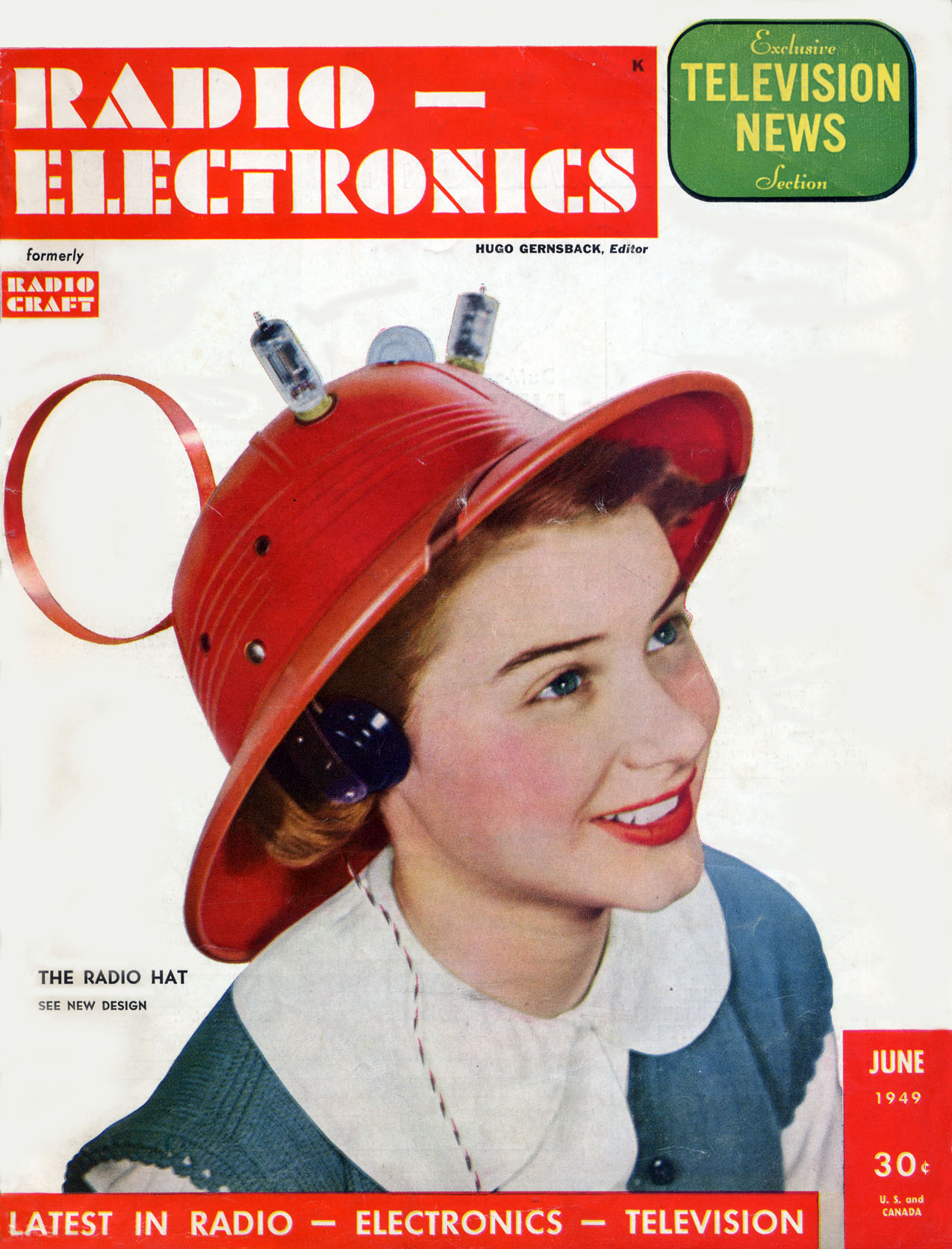
15-year-old Lange modeling the "Man-from-Mars, Radio Hat", 1949

Lange was born into a theatrical family in Redding, Connecticut. Her father, John George Lange, was a cellist and the music arranger for Florenz Ziegfeld and conductor for Henry Cohen; her mother, Minette (née Buddecke), was an actress. They had two other daughters, Minelda and Joy, and a son, David. John worked in New York City and the family moved to Greenwich Village when Hope was a young child.

Lange sang with other children in the play Life, Laughter and Tears, which opened at the Booth Theatre in March 1942. Her father died in September 1942. The family stayed in New York City after his death. At age 9, she had a speaking part in the award-winning Broadway play The Patriots, which opened in January 1943. From 1944 to 1956 Minette ran a restaurant on Macdougal Street, near Washington Square Park, called Minette's of Washington Square. (Some sources confuse it with Minetta Tavern, an Italian restaurant on Macdougal Street, founded in 1937.) The entire family worked there; Minelda ran the cash register, and Joy and Hope waited on tables.

In high school, Lange studied dance, modeled, and worked in the family restaurant. She sometimes walked the dog of former First Lady Eleanor Roosevelt, who had a nearby apartment. When her photo appeared in the newspaper, she received an offer to work as a New York City advertising model. She appeared on the June 1949 cover of Radio-Electronics magazine wearing the "Man from Mars" Radio Hat. This portable radio built into a pith helmet was a sensation in 1949.

Lange attended Reed College in Portland, Oregon, studying dance and theater. At Reed, she was a student of artist Xenia Cage. After completing her first year of studies, Lange transferred to Barmore Junior College in New York, where she met her first husband, Don Murray.

== Career ==
Lange began working in television in the 1950s with appearances on Kraft Television Theatre. She was seen by a Hollywood producer and contracted to 20th Century Fox. She came to prominence in her first film role in Bus Stop with Marilyn Monroe and Don Murray, whom she married on April 14, 1956. Murray later said that Monroe grew jealous of another blonde being hired for the movie and asked the producers to dye Lange's blonde hair light brown.

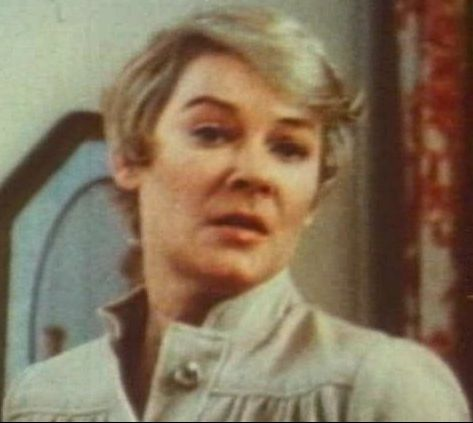
Lange in Death Wish (1974)

After favorable reviews, Lange landed a major role in the then-risqué 1957 film Peyton Place. Her strong performance earned her a nomination for a Golden Globe Award and another for the Academy Award for Best Supporting Actress. She subsequently became well known for such supporting ingénue roles, and said that the resulting typecasting shortened her movie career.

She went on to appear in Nicholas Ray's film The True Story of Jesse James (1957) as James' wife, opposite Robert Wagner; and in The Young Lions with Montgomery Clift. She starred as the wife of Jeffrey Hunter's character in Anton Myrer's wartime drama In Love and War (1958). These roles led to her earning top billing in The Best of Everything (1959), with Suzy Parker and Joan Crawford.

Lange appeared as Elvis Presley's older psychologist love interest in Wild in the Country (1961), despite being only 13 months Elvis's senior. She then appeared in Frank Capra's final movie, Pocketful of Miracles, with Glenn Ford (for whom she had left her husband, fellow actor Don Murray). The next year, she co-starred with Ford again, in the romantic comedy Love Is a Ball.

Lange returned to television for a 1966 role on the series The Fugitive (1963). She starred from 1968 to 1970 on the television series, The Ghost & Mrs. Muir for which she earned two Emmy Awards. and a Golden Globe Award nomination. This success was followed by three seasons on The New Dick Van Dyke Show as Dick Van Dyke's wife, Jenny Preston, from 1971 to 1974, after which she declined to return for a fourth season of the show. She also appeared in twelve television movies, one being Crowhaven Farm where she played the role of a witch. In 1977, she returned to the Broadway stage where her acting career had originally begun. She also played the murdered wife of Charles Bronson's vigilante character in Death Wish (1974). In 1985, she appeared in A Nightmare on Elm Street 2: Freddy's Revenge, and in 1986, she took a role as Laura Dern's mother in David Lynch's Blue Velvet. She took a Broadway role in Same Time, Next Year and then made appearances in the television movie based on Danielle Steel's Message from Nam and in Clear and Present Danger (1994).

Lange made appearances in the Maine town in which Peyton Place had been filmed during the film's 40th anniversary celebrations in 1998.

== Personal life ==
=== Date of birth ===
Lange's year of birth is often reported as 1931, but the correct year is 1933. A possible source of this error is the Reader's Digest Almanac and Yearbook. It had shown the year as 1931 from as early as its 1980 edition up until its 2009 issue. (The Almanac and Yearbook's 1976 and earlier editions had consistently reported Lange's year of birth as 1933.) Other references such as Chase's Annual Events have always shown 1933, as does her Social Security Death Index entry.

The 1933 year also matches the ages given in newspaper accounts of Lange in her youth. The New York Times covered the annual "Young People's Concert" awards given at Carnegie Hall. Lange received an award in April 1945 and again in April 1946, when her age was given as 12. Lange's age of 12 in April 1946 would correspond to a birthdate in November 1933, not 1931.

Also, a short feature story was published in February 1951 about Hope Lange's culinary skills. The first paragraph gives the biography of a 17-year-old Hope Lange of Greenwich Village, New York. Her late father was "director of music for Florenz Ziegfield [sic]" and her mother had a catering business. In addition to modeling, acting, and dancing, Hope could make "terrific" sandwiches. The article gives her recipes for "Sardine Strips" and "Cheese Ribbon" sandwiches. Born in 1933, Lange would have been 17 years old in February 1951.

=== Marriages and relationships ===
Lange's first marriage was to actor Don Murray. They married while he was filming his breakout role in Bus Stop with Marilyn Monroe in 1956; they had two children, actor Christopher Murray and photographer Patricia Murray. Lange left Don Murray in 1961 for actor Glenn Ford, the associate producer and co-star of Pocketful of Miracles. They had a four-year relationship but never married. From October 19, 1963, until their divorce in 1971, Lange was married to film director Alan J. Pakula.

In 1972, Hope dated Frank Sinatra and began a relationship with the married novelist John Cheever. In 1986, she married theatrical producer Charles Hollerith, Jr. (1927–2011), with whom she remained for the rest of her life.

== Death ==
Lange died on December 19, 2003, at St. John's Hospital in Santa Monica, California, as a result of an ischemic colitis infection at the age of 70. Her body was cremated.

== Filmography ==
=== Film ===
Year	Title	Role	Notes	Ref.
1956	Bus Stop	Elma Duckworth	Alternative title: The Wrong Kind of Girl	
1957	The True Story of Jesse James	Zee James	Alternative title: The James Brothers	
1957	Peyton Place	Selena Cross		
1958	The Young Lions	Hope Plowman		
1958	In Love and War	Andrea Lenaine Kantaylis		
1959	The Best of Everything	Caroline Bender		
1961	Wild in the Country	Irene Sperry		
1961	Pocketful of Miracles	Elizabeth "Queenie" Martin		
1963	Love Is a Ball	Millicent "Millie" Mehaffey	Alternative title: All This and Money Too	
1968	Jigsaw	Helen Atterbury		
1974	I Love You... Good-bye	Karen Chandler		
1974	Death Wish	Joanna Kersey		
1983	The Prodigal	Anne Stewart		
1983	I Am the Cheese	Betty Farmer		
1985	A Nightmare on Elm Street 2: Freddy's Revenge	Cheryl Walsh		
1986	Blue Velvet	Mrs. Williams		
1990	Tune in Tomorrow	Margaret Quince	Alternative title: Aunt Julia and the Scriptwriter	
1994	Clear and Present Danger	Senator Mayo		
1995	Just Cause	Libby Prentiss		

=== Television ===
Year	Title	Role	Notes	Ref.
1956	Kraft Television Theatre	Randy	Episode: "Snapfinger Creek"	
1957–1958	Playhouse 90	Raiya; Jessica Lovell; Alex Winter	3 episodes	
1962	Cyrano De Bergerac	Roxane	Television film	
1962; 1975	Hallmark Hall of Fame	Roxane; Mrs. Douglas	2 episodes	
1966	Bob Hope Presents the Chrysler Theatre	Rachel Douglas	Episode: "Shipwrecked"	
1966	The Fugitive	Annie Johnson	Episode: "The Last Oasis"	
1967	CBS Playhouse	Lois Graves	Episode: "Dear Friends"	
1968–1970	The Ghost & Mrs. Muir	Carolyn Muir	50 episodes	
1970	Crowhaven Farm	Maggie Porter	Television film	
1971–1974	The New Dick Van Dyke Show	Jenny Preston	72 episodes	
1972	That Certain Summer	Janet Salter	Television film	
1973	The 500 Pound Jerk	Karen Walsh	Television film	
1974	I Love You, Good-bye	Karen Chandler	Television film	
1974	Fer-de-Lance	Elaine Wedell	Television film	
1975	The Secret Night Caller	Pat Durant	Television film	
1975	Medical Story	Diana Hopkins	Episode: "Woman In White"	
1975	The Rivalry	Mrs. Douglas	Television film	
1976	Gibbsville	Harriet	Episode: "Afternoon Waltz"	
1977	Police Story	Ann Wells	Episode: "Nightmare on a Sunday Morning"	
1977	The Love Boat II	Elaine Palmer	Television film	
1978	The Love Boat	Sandra Newberry	Episode: "Where Is It Written?/Julie's Aunt/The Big Deal"	
1978	Match Game	Herself (panelist)	5 episodes	
1979	Like Normal People	Roz Meyers	Television film	
1980	The Day Christ Died	Claudia	Television film	
1980	Beulah Land	Deborah Kendrick	Miniseries	
1980	Pleasure Palace	Madelaine Calvert	Television film	
1982	Matt Houston	Kate Riley	Episode: "Recipe for Murder"	
1983	Fantasy Island	Marion Stamford	Episode: "Naughty Marietta/The Winning Ticket"	
1983–1986	Hotel	Gwen Andrews; Dr. Hannah Fielding	2 episodes	
1984	Finder of Lost Loves	Catherine Connally Smith	Episode: "Maxwell Ltd: Finder of Lost Loves Pilot"	
1985	Survival Guide		Television film	
1985	Private Sessions	Mrs. Coles	Television film	
1987	Ford: The Man and the Machine	Clara Ford	Television film	
1987	Trying Times	Frances Fletcher	Episode: " A Family Tree"	
1987–1993	Murder, She Wrote	Charlotte Newcastle; Helen Lewis	2 episodes	
1989	Knight & Daye	Gloria Daye	7 episodes	
1993	Dead Before Dawn	Virginia DeSilva	Television film	
1993	Cooperstown	Cassie Willette	Television film	
1993	Message from Nam	Marjorie Wilson	Television film	
1998	Before He Wakes	Helen Rawlings	Television film, (final film role)	

== Awards and nominations ==
Year	Award	Category	Nominated work	Result	Ref.
1957	Academy Awards	Best Supporting Actress	Peyton Place	Nominated	
1969	Primetime Emmy Awards	Outstanding Continued Performance by an Actress in a Leading Role in a Comedy Series	The Ghost & Mrs. Muir	Won	
1970	Primetime Emmy Awards	Outstanding Continued Performance by an Actress in a Leading Role in a Comedy Series	The Ghost & Mrs. Muir	Won	
1973	Primetime Emmy Awards	Outstanding Single Performance by an Actress in a Leading Role	That Certain Summer	Nominated	
1957	Golden Globe Awards	Best Supporting Actress – Motion Picture	Peyton Place	Nominated	
1968	Golden Globe Awards	Best TV Star – Female	The Ghost & Mrs. Muir	Nominated	
1957	Laurel Awards	Top New Female Personality	—N/a	Nominated	
1973	TP de Oro	Best Foreign Actress	—N/a	5th Place	
2008	TV Land Awards	Favorite Character from the "Other Side"	The Ghost & Mrs. Muir	Nominated	
