= Tami Erin =

American actress, model, singer, producer and fashion designer

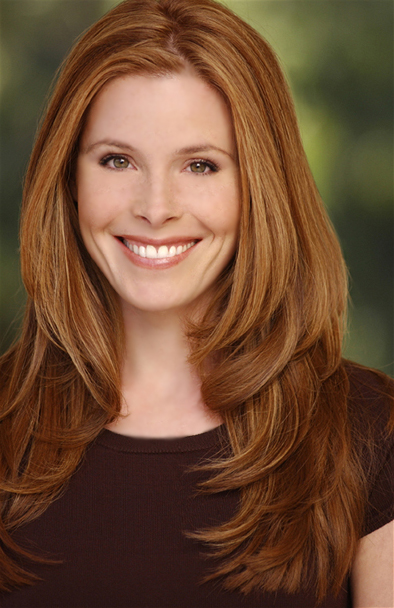
- Erin in 2003
- Born: Tamara Erin Klicman; July 8, 1974 (age 52); Wheaton, Illinois, U.S.
- Occupations: actress model
- Years active: 1982-present

Tamara Erin Klicman (born July 8, 1974), known professionally as Tami Erin, is an American actress and model. She is best known for her role as Pippi Longstocking in the 1988 movie The New Adventures of Pippi Longstocking, released in movie theaters worldwide in 13 languages by Columbia Pictures.

== Acting and modeling ==
Erin began acting and modeling at eight years old after becoming an Elite Model with Elite Model Management. She took method acting, singing, dancing, and gymnastics. Erin grew up in Wheaton, Illinois, and when she was nine years old her family moved to Miami, Florida.

Erin auditioned for the role of Pippi Longstocking for the film The New Adventures of Pippi Longstocking when she was eleven years old and won the part out of over 8,000 girls. The film's director, Ken Annakin, described her personality as a good fit for the role: "Tami radiates sunshine. When she smiles everyone is happy. She is Pippi Longstocking."

Erin also appeared in the "Chrimbus Special" episode of Tim and Eric Awesome Show, Great Job!.

== Philanthropy ==
In 1988 Tami Erin was appointed as a United Nations Ambassador for UNICEF. Highlights included speaking at World Children's Day at the United Nations, New York City to the delegates of over 100 countries in the general assembly hall. Further, Erin became an international ambassador for Hearts.com to raise funds for the IHeart Change program for six international charities including Generosity Water, Pencils of Promise, Eden Projects, International Lifeline Fund, Free The Slaves, and Kili To Chili.

== Personal life ==
In 2020 at the beginning of the COVID-19 pandemic, Tami Erin lived with her boyfriend, Tommy Parker, in Grand Lake (Oklahoma).

== Filmography ==
=== Film ===
Year	Title	Role
1988	The New Adventures of Pippi Longstocking	Pippi Longstocking
1998	Kill You Twice	Angie
2005	The Little Rose (Short Story)	Flower
2007	AGENTS	LG-22
2009	Straight From the Horses Mouth	Self
2010	Disconnect	1960s Operator
2010	Tim and Eric Awesome Show, Great Job! Chrimbus Special (TV special)	Wife of Pasta Bear
2012	I Heart San Francisco	Herself

=== Television ===
Year	Title	Role	Network
1986–1989	International Network Television	Herself	Various
1986–1989	Domestic Network Television	Herself	Various
1988	Yappari Neko Ga Suki	Herself	Fuji Television Network
1998	The Grand Prize	Herself	ARD (Broadcasting)
1998	Good Morning America	Herself	ABC Television
1988	Today Show	Herself	NBC
1988	Entertainment Tonight	Herself	CBS Television
1995	BBC News	Herself	BBC News
2003	KRON-TV	Herself	NBC
2010–2018	TMZ on TV	Herself	Fox Broadcasting Company
