= Arthur 2: On the Rocks =

1988 Bud Yorkin film

- Theatrical release poster
- Directed by: Bud Yorkin
- Written by: Andy Breckman
- Based on: Characters by Steve Gordon
- Produced by: Robert Shapiro; Dudley Moore
- Starring: Dudley Moore; Liza Minnelli; John Gielgud
- Cinematography: Stephen H. Burum
- Edited by: Michael Kahn
- Music by: Burt Bacharach
- Production company: Havlin-Shapiro Productions
- Distributed by: Warner Bros.
- Release date: July 8, 1988
- Running time: 113 minutes
- Country: United States
- Language: English
- Box office: $14.7 million

Arthur 2: On the Rocks is a 1988 American romantic comedy film and the sequel to the 1981 film Arthur. Dudley Moore, Liza Minnelli, John Gielgud, Geraldine Fitzgerald, Stephen Elliott, Thomas Barbour, Ted Ross and Barney Martin reprise their roles with Cynthia Sikes replacing Jill Eikenberry, who was committed to filming L.A. Law at the time, in the role of Susan Johnson. Burt Bacharach also returned to score the film. The soundtrack also features songs by popular artists, including OMD and Kylie Minogue. While still a comedy, On the Rocks is somewhat darker than its predecessor. The film received generally negative reviews and also was a financial disappointment when compared to the more successful original.

== Plot ==
Roughly five years after the events of the first film, Arthur Bach enjoys playing practical jokes on his new assistant, a friendly but uptight man named Fairchild, but still deeply misses Hobson. Arthur's wife Linda Marolla is told by a doctor that she cannot have children. The two decide to adopt a child instead from a woman named Cynthia Canby, but Arthur's continuing alcoholism is a cause for concern.

Arthur is informed by his father Stanford that the family's company has undergone a business merger with Burt Johnson, the vengeful billionaire father of Susan, Arthur's ex-fiancée. The Bach family will keep their wealth and way of life, but only if Arthur is cut off from his $750 million fortune. Arthur confronts Burt about this, and Burt tells him that he can have his money back on two conditions: divorce Linda and marry Susan. Arthur refuses, as he loves Linda more than his lavish lifestyle.

Now broke, Arthur and Linda move in with Linda's father, Ralph, and Linda gets back her old job as a waitress. Things are going well at first, but Burt is determined to make Susan happy, so he buys the building they are living in and forces Arthur and Linda to leave. Now homeless, Arthur and Linda move into a squalid apartment and Arthur tries to sober up to find a job, knowing that bad finances could ruin any chance they have of adopting a baby. After the owner takes pity on him, Arthur finds work at a hardware store, but Burt buys the store and has Arthur fired.

Susan arrives at Arthur and Linda's apartment and tells Linda that if she really wants what's best for Arthur, then she should leave him, since Susan can have children, and Linda cannot. Realizing that Arthur is suffering because he is unwilling to let her go, Linda moves back in with Ralph and leaves Arthur a note telling him that he should marry Susan and live a comfortable life. Crestfallen at having lost Linda and still unwilling to marry Susan, Arthur begins drinking again and ends up living on the streets. At his lowest point, Arthur sees a vision of Hobson telling him that he cannot give up, because he knows Arthur will have a son, and Arthur must be there for him.

Determined to get even with the Johnsons, Arthur gets sober again and learns from his grandmother, Martha, that Burt has made a lot of enemies that have dirt on him. Arthur meets with several people whose lives have been ruined by Burt, and learns of a fraud and extortion scheme that Burt was responsible for. Arthur sneaks onto Burt's yacht and confronts him, demanding that they leave him and Linda alone. Burt and his friends laugh at Arthur, freely admitting that the allegations are true, but the statute of limitations has expired and the evidence is worthless. Arthur punches Burt in the gut, and Burt attempts to shoot Arthur with a revolver. However, realizing that money cannot get her everything, Susan defends Arthur and tells Burt to give Arthur his money back or she will tell her mother about his affairs. Burt reluctantly agrees.

Arthur seeks out Linda and tells her that he has gotten his money back and secured the adoption of a child. Mrs. Canby arrives with their adopted child, a baby girl. Arthur is confused because Hobson had told him he would have a son. However, Linda surprises Arthur with the news that she is pregnant. The two return to their home and Fairchild plays a practical joke on Arthur for the first time. Arthur moves Fairchild into a new room, the room that used to belong to Hobson.

== Cast ==
- Dudley Moore as Arthur Bach
- Liza Minnelli as Linda Marolla Bach
- John Gielgud as Hobson
- Geraldine Fitzgerald as Martha Bach
- Kathy Bates as Mrs. Canby
- Paul Benedict as Fairchild
- Stephen Elliott as Burt Johnson
- Cynthia Sikes as Susan Johnson
- Ted Ross as Bitterman
- Barney Martin as Ralph Marolla
- Thomas Barbour as Stanford Bach
- Jack Gilford as Mr. Butterworth
- Ron Canada as Bartender

== Production ==
In 1987, Warner Bros. Pictures and Orion Pictures, the studio which made the original Arthur (1981), made a tradeoff agreement to facilitate the filming of Throw Momma from the Train (1987), developed by Orion Pictures, and the development of Arthur 2. The deal was provided by producer Larry Brezner, who produced Throw Momma from the Train as well as Arthur. In return for permission to use clips from the Alfred Hitchcock film Strangers on a Train (1951) in Throw Momma from the Train, Brezner's production company surrendered the remake and sequel rights of Arthur to Warner Bros. Although Warner Bros. distributed the original Arthur, the rights were jointly owned by Jack Rollins, Charles H. Joffe, Buddy Morra, Larry Brezner and Warner Bros.; Warner could not have proceeded with the Arthur sequel without the consent of Brezner's company.

== Reception ==
The film received generally negative reviews from critics and holds a Rotten Tomatoes rating of 13% based on 23 reviews. The site's critical consensus reads, "Arthur's boozy charm curdles into a bad hangover in this unnecessary sequel." The Washington Post opined that "the result is about as funny as the plight of an alcoholic." Variety gave the film a positive review, saying On the Rocks is "Not as classy a farce as the original, but still manages to be an amusing romp for most of its length."

Liza Minnelli earned the Golden Raspberry Award for Worst Actress, for this film as well as Rent-a-Cop, at the 9th Golden Raspberry Awards.

=== Box office ===
The film was not a box office success, and was overshadowed by the release of Who Framed Roger Rabbit. It earned $14.7 million in American ticket sales, compared to the original film's $95.5 million.
