= Rent-a-Cop =

1988 film by Jerry London

- Theatrical release poster by Tom Jung. Tagline: "There's a killer on the loose and the lady is the target"
- Directed by: Jerry London
- Written by: Michael Blodgett; Dennis Shryack
- Produced by: Raymond Wagner; John D. Schofield
- Starring: Burt Reynolds; Liza Minnelli; James Remar; Richard Masur; Bernie Casey; John Stanton; John P. Ryan; Dionne Warwick; Robby Benson
- Cinematography: Giuseppe Rotunno
- Edited by: Robert Lawrence
- Music by: Jerry Goldsmith
- Production company: Kings Road Entertainment
- Distributed by: Kings Road Entertainment
- Release dates: November 26, 1987 (West Germany); January 15, 1988 (United States)
- Running time: 96 mins.
- Country: United States
- Language: English
- Budget: $16 million
- Box office: $295,000

Rent-a-Cop is a 1987 American thriller comedy starring Burt Reynolds and Liza Minnelli. Reynolds plays Tony Church, a disgraced police officer working as a security guard, who falls in love with Della Roberts (Minnelli), a prostitute.

The film saw both lead actors to be nominated at the 9th Golden Raspberry Awards for Worst Actor and Worst Actress. (These nominations were not solely on the merits of Rent-a-Cop, however; Reynolds and Minnelli were also cited for Switching Channels and Arthur 2: On the Rocks, respectively). Minnelli ended up "winning" the Worst Actress prize.

The film earned under $300,000 in American ticket sales. Initially released on 26 November 1987 in West Germany, its American premiere came two months later on 15 January 1988. Although set in Chicago, the movie was mostly filmed in Italy.

== Plot ==
Chicago cop Tony Church and his team are completing a drug bust. Just as the cops make the arrest a masked thief called Adam "Dancer" Booth intervenes and executes all of the officers. Church attempts to apprehend Dancer but Dancer outwits him and takes a hostage Della Roberts. Della manages to escape as Dancer flees and Church is left facing the blame of the disastrous bust and winds up getting fired from the force.

Della, a high-priced hooker, unbeknownst to Church and the other cops, happened to be in the hotel at the time and caught a good look at Dancer's face. She encounters Dancer again as he attempts to assassinate her but she manages to escape. Afraid Dancer will come after her again and succeed in killing her, Della decides that she needs protection and she tracks down the lowly Church, who is now working as a security guard in a shopping mall. She offers to pay Church to act as her bodyguard until Dancer is apprehended.

Church's longtime colleague Roger Latrele, tracks him down and advises him to steer clear of the case as it destroyed his career. Unfortunately for Church, Roger is revealed to be a corrupt cop who is involved with Dancer. Della and Church form an unlikely bond and a relationship blossoms. Church and Della decide that the only way to apprehend Dancer is to use Della as bait. They come up with a plan and just as it seems to have gone wrong, Church emerges to save Della's life and kills Dancer. The final scene shows Church and Della attempting to give their new relationship a chance.

== Cast ==
- Burt Reynolds as Tony Church
- Liza Minnelli as Della Roberts
- James Remar as Adam "Dancer" Booth
- Richard Masur as Roger Latrele
- Dionne Warwick as Beth Connors
- Bernie Casey as Lemar
- Robby Benson as Andrew Pitts
- John Stanton as Haskell Alexander
- John P. Ryan as Commander Wieser
- Larry Dolgin as Captain James
- Roslyn Alexander as Miss Barley
- Cyrus Elias as Victor
- JoBe Cerny as Clerk
- Ned Schmidtke as Lindy
- Mickey Knox as Frank
- Dennis Cockrum as El Train Man
- Michael Rooker as Joe
- Paul Raci as Waiter

== Production ==
Although filming was to have begun in October 1986, it was pushed back to November.Rent-a-Cop was the feature film debut of director Jerry London, who had made his name through his work on television mini series such as Shogun. Burt Reynolds was paid $3 million for his role in the film. "His last couple of pictures were dark movies," said director Jerry London. "Audiences didn't come out of theaters with that warm glow Burt can give. I think this film will do it. Everyone says Burt hasn't been better in years."

Rent-a-Cop was Liza Minnelli's first film in five years. She had been admitted to the Betty Ford Clinic in 1984 for substance abuse problems. "Everybody I know, including myself, gets into trouble," she said. "When you dole out too much credit to public opinion, when your sense of self gets blurry, when you feel that what people think is more important than how you feel . . . that's when it's dangerous and that's an easy thing to happen - to me, to a housewife. That's when you worry about getting enough sleep, so you take a sleeping pill; when other people think you're overweight, so you take a diet pill. And then you find yourself in rehab."

"The cop and the hooker story has been done a million times," said Reynolds. "The secret to doing the story is always the cop that hates the girl and the girl that hates the cop, but they need each other for whatever reason." Reynolds said he and Minnelli "like each other enormously, and that's kind of the subtext of what we are doing. We make each other laugh a lot." Reynolds and Minnelli would improvise routines about Reynolds's real-life nostalgia for the 1950s.

Location filming took place in Chicago. Studio work was done in Rome. "He is an intelligent, sharp and hard-working professional," said London about Reynolds, "and the chemistry between him and Minnelli is wonderful. I think Rent-A-Cop is an audience picture, the kind of film where you have a good time for an hour and 40 minutes. It is just what Burt and his audience need."

== Reception ==
The film received negative reviews from critics, having a Rotten Tomatoes score of 14%, with 12 out of 14 professional reviews being negative. Walter Goodman reviewing for The New York Times praised Minnelli's performance, but described the plot as sloppy and the directing as efficient but uninspired. Roger Ebert gave it 2 out of 4 stars, saying "Rent-A-Cop is a collision between a relationship and a cliche, and the cliche wins, but not before the relationship has given us some nice moments".
