= Garrison True =

American actor and casting director

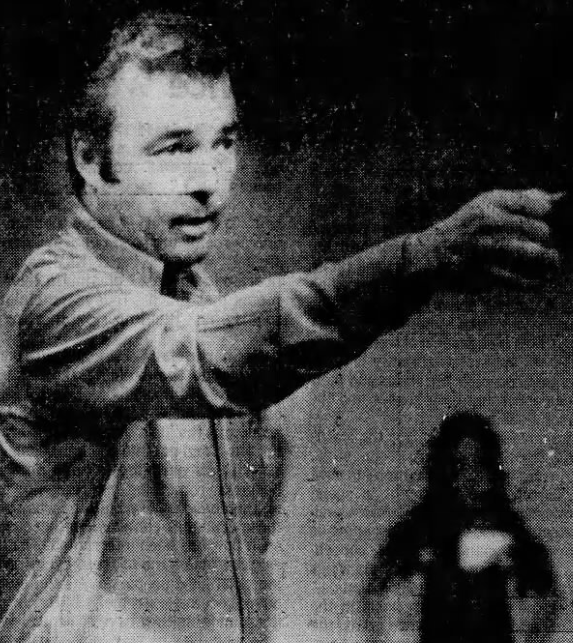
- True in 1980
- Born: March 14, 1935 (age 91); New York, U.S.
- Education: New School for Social Research
- Occupations: Actor, casting director

Garrison True (born March 14, 1935) is an American actor and casting director. He is known for playing the recurring role of Henry Brewster in the second season of the American sitcom television series Petticoat Junction.

== Life and career ==
True was born in New York, the son of Charles and Rose True. He attended the New School for Social Research. He began his screen career in 1956, appearing in the film Rock, Rock, Rock!. In 1961, he made his television debut in the syndicated adventure television series Ripcord.

Later in his career, True guest-starred in television programs including The F.B.I, Star Trek: The Original Series, The Fugitive, 12 O’Clock High and The Beverly Hillbillies, and played the recurring role of Henry Brewster in the second season of the CBS sitcom television series Petticoat Junction. He also appeared in films such as Bonnie's Kids, Portrait of a Hitman and Day of the Animals. During his screen career, he worked as a casting director for the television programs Atlantis: The Lost Continent, Centennial, High Mountain Rangers, Hawaiian Heat and Black Beauty, and was a location director for the 1980 film Brubaker.

True retired from acting in 2013, last appearing in the CBS police procedural television series Criminal Minds.
