= Rambo III =

1988 film by Peter MacDonald

- Theatrical release poster
- Directed by: Peter MacDonald
- Written by: Sylvester Stallone; Sheldon Lettich
- Based on: Characters by David Morrell
- Produced by: Buzz Feitshans
- Starring: Sylvester Stallone; Richard Crenna
- Cinematography: John Stanier
- Edited by: James Symons; Andrew London; O. Nicholas Brown
- Music by: Jerry Goldsmith
- Production company: Carolco Pictures
- Distributed by: Tri-Star Pictures
- Release date: May 25, 1988 (United States)
- Running time: 101 minutes
- Country: United States
- Language: English
- Budget: $53–63 million
- Box office: $189 million

Rambo III is a 1988 American action film starring Sylvester Stallone as Vietnam War veteran John Rambo. Directed by Peter MacDonald, the script was co-written by Stallone and Sheldon Lettich. It is a sequel to Rambo: First Blood Part II (1985) and the third installment in the Rambo film series. Richard Crenna reprises his role as Colonel Sam Trautman. The film depicts fictional events during the Soviet–Afghan War. In the film, Rambo sets out on a dangerous journey to the Democratic Republic of Afghanistan in order to rescue his former commander and his longtime best friend, Col. Trautman, from the hands of Alexei Zaysen, an extremely powerful and ruthless Soviet Army colonel who is bent on killing both Trautman and Rambo, and helps a local band of Afghan rebels fight against Soviet forces threatening to destroy their village.

Rambo III was released worldwide by Tri-Star Pictures on May 25, 1988. At the time of its release, Rambo III was the most expensive film ever made with a production budget between $53 and $63 million. The film was not well received by critics and grossed less than its predecessor, Rambo: First Blood Part II, grossing $189 million worldwide. It was nominated for five categories at the 9th Golden Raspberry Awards, winning Worst Actor. A sequel, Rambo, was released in 2008 with Stallone reprising his role and also directing the film.

== Plot ==
After being pardoned for saving the POWs in Vietnam, (Note: As depicted in Rambo: First Blood Part II (1985)) former U.S. Army Green Beret John Rambo has settled in a Thai Buddhist monastery, helping with construction work and competing in krabi–krabong matches in Bangkok, donating his winnings. His old friend and ally Colonel Sam Trautman visits and explains that he is putting together a mercenary team for a CIA-sponsored mission to supply the Mujahideen and other tribes as they fight the Soviet Army in Afghanistan. Despite being shown photos of civilians suffering at the hands of the Soviets, Rambo refuses to join, as he is tired of fighting. Trautman proceeds but is ambushed at the border by Soviet forces, who kill his team and capture him. Trautman is sent to a large mountain base to be interrogated by Soviet Colonel Alexei Zaysen and his henchman Sergeant Kourov.

Embassy official Robert Griggs informs Rambo of Trautman's capture but objects to approve a rescue mission for fear of drawing the U.S. into the war. Aware that Trautman will die otherwise, Rambo receives permission to undertake a solo rescue on the condition that he will be disavowed in the event of capture or execution. Rambo flies to Peshawar, Pakistan, where he convinces arms dealer Mousa Ghani to bring him to Khost, the town closest to the Soviet base where Trautman is held captive.

The Mujahideen in the village, led by chieftain Masoud, hesitate to help Rambo free Trautman. Meanwhile, a Soviet informant in Ghani's employ alerts the Soviets, who send two attack helicopters to destroy the village. Although Rambo destroys one of them with a DShK heavy machine gun, the rebels decline to cooperate with him any further. Aided only by Mousa and a young boy named Hamid, Rambo attacks the base and inflicts significant damage before being forced to retreat. Rambo and Hamid are wounded during the battle, and Rambo sends him and Mousa away before resuming his infiltration.

Evading base security, Rambo reaches and frees Trautman before he can be tortured with a flamethrower. He and Trautman rescue several other prisoners and hijack a helicopter to escape the base, but it is damaged during takeoff and crashes, forcing the escapees to flee on foot. An attack helicopter pursues Rambo and Trautman to a nearby cave, where Rambo destroys it with an explosive arrow. A furious Zaysen sends Spetsnaz commandos under Kourov to kill them, but they are routed and killed. An injured Kourov fights Rambo in hand-to-hand combat, but is overpowered and killed as well.

Rambo and Trautman make their way to the Pakistani border but are intercepted by Zaysen and his mechanized infantry. Suddenly, Masoud's Mujahideen forces, including Mousa and Hamid, arrive to rescue them in a massive cavalry charge. In the midst of the battle, Rambo hijacks a tank and fights Zaysen's Mi-24 Hind-D, culminating in a head-on charge as both unleash their vehicles' weaponry on each other; Rambo survives by destroying the Hind-D with his tank's main gun before it can ram him, after killing Zaysen with the tank's machine gun. After the battle, Rambo and Trautman bid farewell to the Mujahideen and leave Afghanistan.

== Cast ==
- Sylvester Stallone as John Rambo
- Richard Crenna as US Army Colonel Sam Trautman
- Kurtwood Smith as Robert Griggs
- Marc de Jonge as Soviet Army Colonel Alexei Zaysen
- Sasson Gabai as Mousa Ghani
- Doudi Shoua as Hamid
- Spiros Fokas as Masoud
- Randy Raney as Sergeant Kourov
- Marcus Gilbert as Tomask
- Alon Abutbul as Nissem
- Yosef Shiloach as Khalid
- Masoud Assadollahi as Rahim
- Shaby Ben-Aroya as Uri

== Production ==
=== Development and writing ===
Sylvester Stallone later said his original premise of the film "was more in keeping with the theme of Tears of the Sun, but set in Afghanistan." Harry Kleiner was hired to write a draft, but his script was rejected by Stallone.

=== Pre-production ===
Sylvester Stallone was a fan of Highlander and asked Russell Mulcahy to direct Rambo III. Mulcahy confessed that he messed up the assignment and was politely fired by Stallone.

In a 2008 online Q&A, Stallone stated that a disagreement over casting led to him firing Mulcahy as the director:

He went to Israel two weeks before me with the task of casting two dozen vicious looking Russian troops. These men were suppose [sic] to make your blood run cold. When I arrived on the set, what I saw was two dozen blond, blue-eyed pretty boys that resembled rejects from a surfing contest. Needless to say Rambo is not afraid of a little competition but being attacked by third rate male models could be an enemy that could overwhelm him. I explained my disappointment to Russell and he totally disagreed, so I asked him and his chiffon army to move on.

Mulcahy was replaced by Peter MacDonald, a veteran second unit director. It was MacDonald's first film as director but he was very experienced and had directed the second unit action sequences in Rambo: First Blood Part II. MacDonald later said, "I tried very hard to change the Rambo character a bit and make him a vulnerable and humorous person, I failed totally." "I knew instinctively what was a good and bad shot," he added. "Stallone knew his character because it was his third outing as Rambo. I wasn't shooting Shakespeare and at times it was hard to take it seriously." MacDonald shot the stick fighting sequence in Bangkok himself using a handheld camera.

The character Masoud, played by Greek actor Spiros Focás, was named after Mujahideen commander Ahmad Shah Massoud who fought the Soviets and later the Taliban. Costumes were procured by buying articles of clothing from Afghan refugees.

=== Filming ===
The film was shot in Israel, Thailand and Arizona. According to MacDonald:

There were so many restrictions in Israel, where you could and couldn't shoot. The producers and Stallone decided they would go back to Arizona where they had looked long before I was on the film. There was a group there called the re-enactors. We had around two hundred and fifty of these guys who re-enact the American Civil War. They were called on to do fight sequences, which they loved.

The scenes at the Thai temple at the beginning of the film were filmed at Wat Phra Phutthabat Tak Pha in Lamphun province. Several weeks into filming, many of the film's crew were fired including the director of photography Ric Waite. Stallone said:

The canvas of this movie is so large you have to constantly think 10 scenes ahead. You can't wing it. They didn't go into the Battle of Waterloo not knowing what their strategy would be. Well, this movie is kind of like a cinematic warfare. We have a huge cast and crew (more than 250 people) and tough locations to deal with. Everyone and everything has to coordinate.

Variety estimated the film's budget at $63 million, then the highest budgeted film of all time. That number was disputed by those involved in the film. Variety later reported that the confusion about the budget was due to the amount estimated for Stallone's salary and whether it was included in the budget. They believed their initial estimate to be within a $10 million range of the actual budget. It was widely reported that Stallone received $20 milion for the film, although Carolco claimed that this number was overstated. He confirmed that Stallone's salary was included in the budget.

=== Equipment ===
The Mil Mi-24 helicopters seen in the film are modified Aérospatiale SA 330 Puma transport helicopters with fabricated bolt-on wings similar to the real Hind-Ds which were mainly used in the former Eastern Bloc. The other helicopter depicted is a slightly reshaped Aérospatiale Gazelle.

=== Dedication ===
The film ends with the on-screen caption "This film is dedicated to the gallant people of Afghanistan." An urban legend falsely claims that the dedication had actually read "This film is dedicated to the brave Mujahideen fighters of Afghanistan" when the film was released in theaters, but then changed to "the gallant people of Afghanistan" after the September 11 attacks in 2001; the group responsible for the attack, al-Qaeda, was founded by Osama bin Laden, who had been one of the Mujahideen. Al-Qaeda then had the opportunity to grow into an Islamic terrorist extremist group under the protection of the Taliban government. This urban legend has been repeated by scholars, but contemporary reviews of the film noted the "gallant people of Afghanistan" dedication.

== Music ==
An extensive film score was written by Jerry Goldsmith, who scored the previous films in the franchise, conducting the Hungarian State Opera Orchestra; however, much of it was not used. Instead, much of the music Goldsmith penned for the previous installment was recycled. The original album, released by Scotti Bros., contained only a portion of the new music as well as three songs, only one of which was used in the film (Bill Medley's version of "He Ain't Heavy, He's My Brother", played over the end credits).

A more complete 75-minute version of the score was later released by Intrada.

== Release ==
=== Marketing ===
The trailer to the film had a negative response with reports of US audiences booing it.

=== Cut version ===
Potentially owing to the proximity of its release to the Hungerford massacre, one minute and five seconds of footage was removed from the film before it could be granted an 18 certificate by the British Board of Film Classification; the amount of deletions was then nearly tripled for its initial video release. Almost all of this footage was restored to the film upon video submission in 2000, aside from a compulsory cut for animal cruelty.

=== Home media ===
Rambo III was released on DVD on November 23, 2004, and a Blu-Ray release followed on May 23, 2008. Rambo III was released on 4K UHD Blu-Ray on November 13, 2018. The film's home video releases have been handled by Lionsgate, under license from French company StudioCanal. StudioCanal's parent company Canal+ had outbid 20th Century Fox for the rights to Carolco Pictures' library after it went bankrupt in 1995. The TV rights and digital distribution rights for Carolco's library belong with Paramount Pictures through its acquisition of Spelling Entertainment, who itself was given these specific rights from Carolco in 1992. The film was subsequently added to Paramount's streaming services Paramount+ and Pluto TV.

== Reception ==
=== Box office ===
Rambo III opened in the United States on May 25, 1988, at 2,562 theaters in its opening weekend (the four-day Memorial Day weekend), ranking number 2 at the US box office with a gross of $21.2 million in 6 days behind Crocodile Dundee II which grossed $29.2 million. In its first 19 days of release, it grossed 44% less than its predecessor with a gross of $39.5 million versus $70.4 million for Rambo: First Blood Part II. Overall, the film grossed $53.7 million in the United States and Canada, and $135.3 million overseas, giving Rambo III a box office total of $189 million. The film was considered to have under-performed in comparison to the previous film in the series, which grossed nearly three times as much domestically. Some critics noted that the timing of the movie, with its unabashedly anti-Soviet tone, ran afoul of the opening of communism to the West under Mikhail Gorbachev, which had already changed the image of the Soviet Union to a substantial degree by the time the film was finished.

=== Critical response ===
On Rotten Tomatoes, the film holds an approval rating of 39% based on 38 reviews, and with an average rating of 4.70/10. The site's critical consensus reads: "Rambo III finds its justice-dispensing hero far from the thoughtful drama that marked the franchise's beginning -- and just as far from quality action thriller entertainment." Metacritic gives the film a weighted average score of 36 out of 100 based on 15 critics, indicating "generally unfavorable reviews". Audiences polled by CinemaScore gave the film an average grade of "B+" on an A+ to F scale.

On At the Movies, prominent critics Gene Siskel and Roger Ebert agreed that Rambo III delivers all the mechanical elements that audiences expect from a big budget action movie but lacks the heart seen in similar films such as the James Bond series and even its immediate predecessor, Rambo: First Blood Part II. Siskel gave it a "thumbs up", while Ebert said he was undecided; however, at the end of the show Ebert's vote was logged as a "thumbs down".

Janet Maslin, reviewing the film in The New York Times, described Rambo III as a modernization of the western film and said that "modern special-effects technology, a huge budget and Mr. Stallone's own derring-do have conspired to let the film pack a wallop that no traditional western or war film could match." She criticized the political themes as one-dimensional, but applauded the film's sense of fun and willingness to engage in self-deprecating humor, though she noted that there are also many unintentionally humorous lines.

In West Germany, the Deutsche Film- und Medienbewertung (FBW), a government film rating office whose ratings influence financial support to filmmakers, earned criticism after it awarded a "worthwhile" rating (in German: wertvoll) to Rambo III.

=== Accolades ===
Award	Category	Subject	Result
Golden Raspberry Award	Worst Picture	Mario Kassar, Buzz Feitshans & Andrew G. Vajna	Nominated
Golden Raspberry Award	Worst Director	Peter MacDonald	Nominated
Golden Raspberry Award	Worst Actor	Sylvester Stallone	Won
Golden Raspberry Award	Worst Supporting Actor	Richard Crenna	Nominated
Golden Raspberry Award	Worst Screenplay	Sylvester Stallone & Sheldon Lettich	Nominated
BMI Film & TV Awards	Film Music Award	Jerry Goldsmith	Won
Youth in Film Awards	Best Young Actor in a Motion Picture: Drama	Doudi Shoua	Nominated

== Sequel ==
A sequel titled Rambo, was released in 2008.

== Other media ==
=== Novelization ===
David Morrell, author of First Blood and the novelization of Rambo: First Blood Part II, wrote the film's novelization, also titled Rambo III.

=== Comic book ===
A comic book adaptation of the film was published by Blackthorne Publishing. Blackthorne also published a 3D version of its Rambo III comic.

=== Video games ===
Various companies released Rambo III, including Ocean Software and Taito. In 1990, Sega released its own game based on the film for the Master System and Genesis/Mega Drive. Sega later adapted some of the battle scenes in the film for the 2008 arcade game Rambo. In 2014, the film was incorporated into Rambo: The Video Game, based on the first three Rambo films.

== In popular culture ==
- In the film Twins, Arnold Schwarzenegger's character Julius Benedict looks at a poster of Rambo III featuring Stallone. He compares his biceps to Stallone's, but waves it off with a smile while shaking his head and walks away.
- The film Hot Shots! Part Deux is an American parody film of Rambo: First Blood Part II and Rambo III, with the colonel role reprised by Richard Crenna.
