= Adrian Pennino =

Fictional character from Rocky series

Adrianna Pennino
- Rocky character
- First appearance: Rocky (1976)
- Last appearance: Rocky V (1990)
- Created by: Sylvester Stallone
- Portrayed by: Talia Shire

In-universe information
- Full name: Adrianna Pennino
- Alias: Adrianna Balboa
- Nickname: Adrian
- Occupation: Part-Time Pet Shop employee Housewife
- Spouse: Rocky Balboa
- Children: Robert Balboa Jr. (son)
- Relatives: Paulie Pennino (brother); Logan Balboa (grandson)
- Religion: Catholicism
- Nationality: American
- Ethnicity: Italian

Adrianna "Adrian" Balboa (née Pennino) (Note: The name "Adrianna Pennino" is spoken during the wedding scene in Rocky II.) is a fictional character from the Rocky series, played by Talia Shire. She is the love interest of Rocky Balboa.

Shire was nominated for the Academy Award for Best Actress for her portrayal of Adrian in Rocky. The final scene in Rocky II, in which Rocky yells "Yo Adrian, I did it!", has been named by film enthusiasts as one of the most iconic quotes in sports film history.

== Casting ==
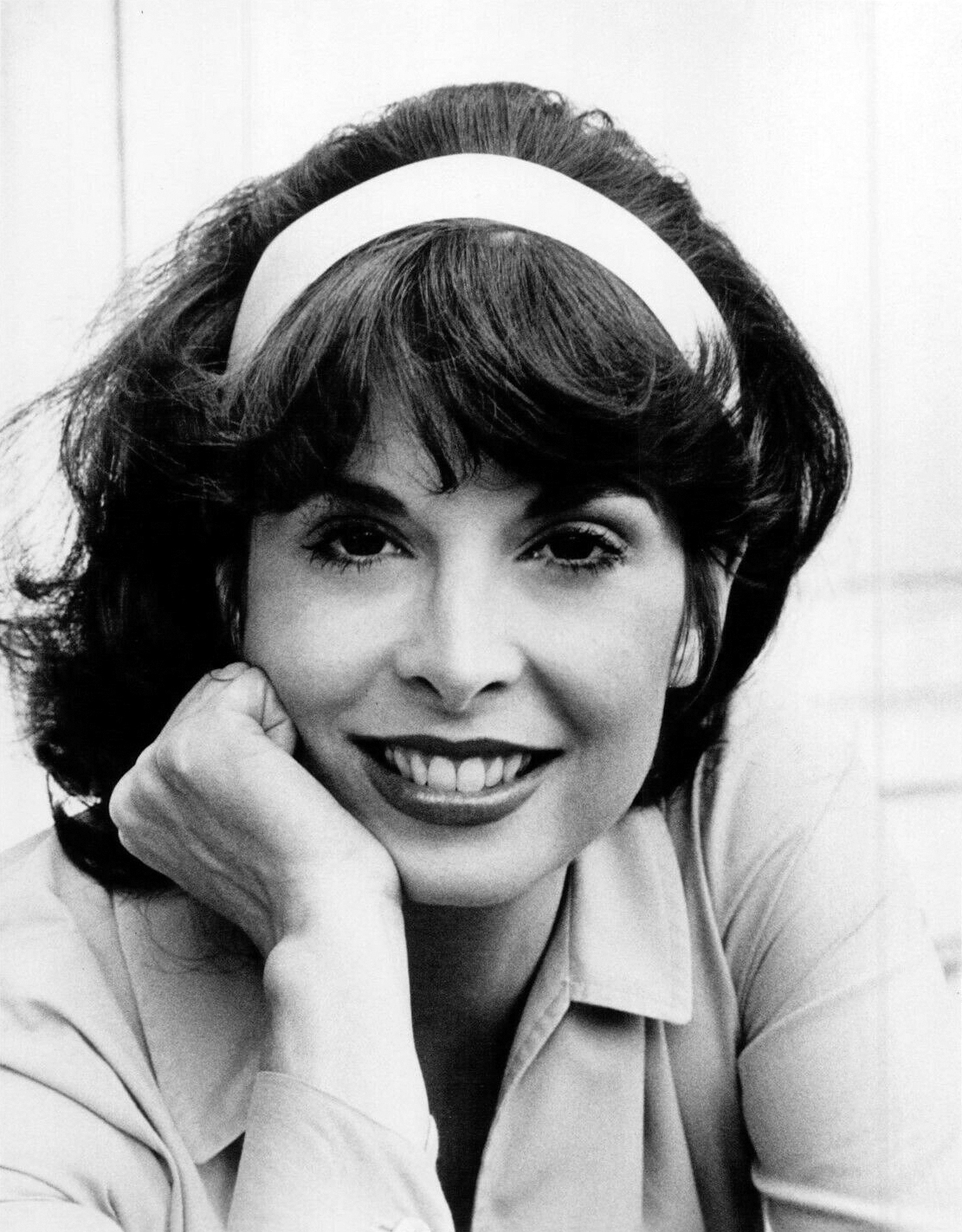
Adrian was played by Talia Shire (1977 photograph)

Originally, Stallone offered Carrie Snodgress the role of Adrian, but she turned it down due to the low salary she was offered. Susan Sarandon was considered, but she was turned down because she was deemed too pretty to play the mousy character of Adrian. Talia Shire then auditioned for the role, and was selected.

== Biography ==
=== Rocky ===
In the first film, Adrian is an Italian-American woman working at the J&M Tropical Fish pet store in Philadelphia, where a small-time boxer, Rocky Balboa, visits frequently to buy food for his pet turtles. Adrian is initially put off by Rocky's tough appearance but is later brought into a relationship with Rocky by her brother, Paulie.

Adrian and Rocky later go on a date to an ice rink on Thanksgiving Day, she asks Rocky why he wanted to be a boxer. He says his father told him that he had no brains, and should develop his body. Adrian is surprised, as her mother said that she didn't have much of a body and should develop her brain. As their relationship develops, she gives Rocky a dog from the shop that he admires; a bull mastiff named Butkus.

On Christmas, an inebriated Paulie physically threatens her and Rocky with a sawed-off baseball bat, only for Adrian to stand up for herself. After he taunts her for not being a virgin, which sends Adrian crying, running towards her room, Rocky stops the tirade, and Adrian asks to live with Rocky at his apartment.

Before Rocky's upcoming fight against Apollo Creed, Adrian decides to stay in Rocky's locker room. She eventually comes out during the 14th round as she witnesses Rocky get knocked down by Apollo, but he gets back his feet and fight on. At the end of the fight, having gone the full 15 rounds, Rocky calls out for her and Adrian rushes toward the ring, losing her hat along the way. As Paulie is denied entrance into the ring by security, she manages to slip inside the ring when he pulls up the ropes. While Creed is announced the winner via split-decision, Rocky and Adrian embrace and confess their love for each other.

=== Rocky II ===
In the second film, Adrian accompanies Rocky to the hospital after his fight against Apollo Creed. Creed tries to goad Rocky into a rematch, but Rocky, instead, intends to retire from boxing, and undergoes surgery for retinal detachment. After his release from the hospital, Rocky proposes to Adrian at the Philadelphia Zoo, and the couple marry with Rocky's trainer Mickey Goldmill in attendance. With Rocky's earnings from the fight with Creed, they buy a new home and purchase a Pontiac Trans Am. Not long after, they discover that they are expecting a baby.

After a failed attempt to appear in commercials to capitalize on his newfound fame, Rocky struggles to look for other jobs, even being laid off from the meat packing plant where Paulie worked, eventually prompting him to sell his Pontiac to Paulie. When Rocky considers accepting a rematch with Apollo, Adrian tries to discourage him. Without Adrian's support Rocky is unable to focus on his training, to Mickey's frustration. Adrian returns part-time to the pet store. Due to the amount of lifting with her job and after a heated argument with Paulie about her refusal to stand by Rocky, she goes into premature labor, collapsing, and gives birth to a boy. Due to excessive blood loss during labor, she slips into a coma. Rocky, distraught, promises to stay with her until she eventually regains consciousness. Rocky had refused to see their baby until Adrian came out of the coma. They see their newborn son for the first time together and, at Adrian's suggestion, name him Robert Balboa Jr. (Robert being Rocky's real first name). Adrian tells Rocky to win for her, giving her blessing for him to fight, and Rocky quickly gets into shape.

On the night of the rematch, she stays home with Paulie to watch the match on her Doctor's orders. Watching the fight on television, she stands up in shock during final round as both Rocky and Apollo fall to the canvas. Both combatants slowly attempt to get back up, but Rocky manages to beat the count while Creed is unable to, becoming heavyweight champion of the world. Adrian and Paulie celebrate and she begins to shed tears of joy as Rocky calls out for her in victory.

=== Rocky III ===
Five years later Rocky has successfully defended his title over 10 defenses and amassed wealth and fame in the process. Mickey also moves into their mansion so they can look out for him. Rocky, Adrian and Mickey attend the unveiling of a bronze statue in honor of the "Italian Stallion" at the Philadelphia Museum of Art. Overwhelmed by the generosity of the city, Rocky announces his plan to retire from professional boxing.

However, Clubber Lang, a new up and coming boxer, challenges Rocky, harshly berating him for being a coward and a "puppet". After Lang taunts Adrian with overtly sexual remarks, this prompts a furious Rocky to accept Lang's challenge, however Mickey confesses he hand-picked the ten challengers that Rocky defeated. With his preparation for the fight with Lang open to the public, Rocky is not able to train seriously for the fight. Minutes before the match, Lang verbally lashes out at Rocky, creating a scuffle between their corner teams, in which Lang shoves Mickey to the floor, causing him to suffer a cardiac arrest. Rocky becomes worried and plans to call the match off, but Mickey urges him to fight on, and Rocky asks Adrian to stay with him until a doctor comes.

Rocky is easily and brutally knocked out by Lang in the second round, and Mickey passes away. Adrian, Rocky, Paulie, and Al Savani (his cutman) gather for Mickey's burial. As Rocky stops by Mickey's gym, he is approached by Apollo Creed, who witnessed the match as a guest analyst. Creed offers to train Rocky for a rematch with Lang.

Adrian, Rocky and Paulie travel to Los Angeles to train with Creed and his old trainer Tony "Duke" Evers for the rematch. Noticing that Rocky is not giving his complete focus, Adrian confronts him on the Santa Monica Beach. During the argument, Rocky reveals that he is afraid of losing, but Adrian ensures that they have everything that they have ever dreamed, such as fame and fortune, and that she will always be there for him, regardless of whether he wins or loses. Bolstered by this, Rocky puts Mickey's death behind him, and with Creed in his corner and Adrian at ringside, Rocky goes on to regain his title from Lang in a third round knockout.

=== Rocky IV ===
In the fourth film, Adrian and Rocky are visited by Apollo, who plans to have an exhibition match against a Russian Soviet Union boxer, Ivan Drago. After hearing his reasons, primarily motivated by patriotism, Adrian tries to discourage Creed, citing that he has been retired for nearly five years, and tells him that she deeply cares about his well-being. Despite her misgivings, an exhibition match between the Creed and Drago materialize. Adrian witnesses the match between Creed and Drago, with Drago beating Creed mercilessly, causing Creed to die in the ring from his injuries. She also attends Creed's funeral alongside Rocky and members of Creed's family, including his wife, Mary-Ann.

Later, Adrian is notified by the press of Rocky announcing his plans to challenge Drago on Christmas Day in Russia. That night, she and Rocky argue about the risks, Adrian telling him that this is a match that he cannot win, Rocky tells Adrian he is a fighter, and he is compelled to avenge Apollo's death. Weeks after Rocky leaves with Paulie and Duke Evers to Russia to train, Adrian surprises him there, and reassures that she will always be with him, no matter what. During the match, Drago overpowers Rocky in the opening round, making it difficult for her to watch. In the second round, Rocky delivers a punch that cuts Drago underneath his eye, thus evening the playing field. After a brutal contest in which Rocky wins the support of the Russian crowd, Adrian cheers Rocky on as he defeats Drago by knockout in the dying moment of the final round.

=== Rocky V ===
Shortly after the match with Drago, Rocky begins to show signs of physical trauma, calling out for Adrian, who urges him to see a doctor after Rocky accidentally refers to her as Mickey. Upon their return to the United States, they reunite with their son, Robert, and hold a subsequent press conference. But, Rocky is interrupted by boxing promoter George Washington Duke, in hopes of creating a lucrative match between Rocky and his challenger, Union Cane, in Tokyo. Adrian takes the podium to announce that Rocky is retiring, which stuns the audience.

Settling back home, Rocky overhears Adrian and Paulie arguing. Paulie inadvertently has Rocky give their accountant a power of attorney, and subsequently embezzled squandered the Balboas' money on real estate deals gone sour, costing the Balboas their entire fortune and virtually all of their assets. In addition, the accountant had failed to pay Rocky's taxes over the past six years, and their mansion has been mortgaged by $400,000. Rocky tells Adrian that he wants to fight again to recoup their losses, but she insists he should be treated by a physician beforehand. Rocky is diagnosed with a form of brain damage, and the effects are deemed irreversible, making it impossible for him to be licensed to box in any state. While Rocky tries to go against his physician's orders, Adrian reassures him that they could make it through, and Rocky reluctantly retires from boxing.

The Balboas move back into Paulie's old house in South Philadelphia. Returning to her job at the J&M Tropical Fish pet shop, Adrian and Rocky are cornered by Duke, who again tries to get Rocky back in the ring, but Adrian confronts Duke as she knows it's a matter of money, and Rocky could be severely disabled. Soon after, Rocky begins training a young boxer from Oklahoma, Tommy Gunn. With Rocky spending all his time training Tommy, it creates a rift between Rocky and Robert.

Duke manages to catch Tommy's attention, which causes him to part ways from his mentor, leaving Rocky severely frustrated. Rocky saw their relationship as another way of winning, getting back to the life they once lived, but Adrian attests to that, citing that the partnership was actually destroying their family, and should instead he pass down his values to his son. Rocky calms down and reconciles with Robert. As Tommy and Rocky engage in a street fight, she is notified by Robert, and the two make their way to the scene. Adrian is last seen walking away with the family in high spirits after Rocky emerged victorious.

=== Rocky Balboa ===
In the autumn of 2001, Adrian discovered that she was dying from ovarian cancer. She underwent chemotherapy, but died peacefully in her sleep on January 11, 2002, with her family by her side. Now widowed, Rocky regularly visits her grave, and on the anniversary of her death, tours the spots where they met and fell in love, along with a somewhat reluctant Paulie, himself regretful over his treatment of his sister.

Rocky now runs a small but successful Italian restaurant named after Adrian, where he regales his patrons with tales from his past. He also battles his personal demons involving his grief over Adrian's death and his eroding relationship with his son Robert, now a young corporate accountant. When Rocky takes on reigning World Heavyweight Champion Mason "The Line" Dixon in an exhibition match, Robert reunites with Rocky at Adrian's graveside, having quit his job to be at his father's side.

Rocky meets a woman named Marie, who was once a troublesome young girl Rocky had escorted home thirty years earlier. (Note: As depicted in Rocky (1976)) Marie now is a single parent of a teenage son, nicknamed "Steps", born out of wedlock. Rocky's friendship with Marie quickly blossoms and he also bonds with Steps, providing him with a much-needed buffer for his grief. On the eve of the fight with Dixon, Marie brings Rocky a photograph of Adrian to his hotel room.

On the night of the match, Dixon easily dominates the first round, only to injure his left hand on Rocky's hip in the second. Rocky then makes a dramatic comeback, knocking Mason down, and surprising the audience with his prowess and chin despite his age. Dixon wins by a close split decision, but Rocky does not mind the outcome, and the crowd gives him a final standing ovation as he leaves the ring.

Rocky returns home and visits Adrian's grave again, thanking her for helping him in spirit, saying "Yo Adrian, we did it. We did it."

=== Creed ===
Years later, Paulie has also died and is buried next to Adrian. Rocky still regularly visits the graveyard, putting a bottle of Paulie's favourite alcoholic drink on his gravestone next to Adrian's. He then places a single red rose at the base of Adrian's headstone and then reads the newspaper to her and Paulie.

When Rocky is diagnosed with Non-Hodgkin lymphoma, he initially chooses not to undergo chemotherapy, partly because of how Adrian's own treatment had failed. Eventually, however, Rocky's new protégé, Adonis Creed, Apollo's illegitimate son, persuades him to fight his illness. Creed becomes Rocky's carer during his treatment, and Rocky trains Creed for his match against his opponent "Pretty" Ricky Conlan. Creed narrowly loses by a split-decision, and he and Rocky are seen walking up the Philadelphia Museum of Art steps at the end.

=== Creed II ===
In Creed II, Rocky again visits Adrian and Paulie's graves and admits that he has been unable to bring himself to call his son Robert, who had moved to Vancouver years earlier. After Adonis Creed's victory over Viktor Drago, Rocky finally goes to see Robert and meets his grandson Logan for the first time, remarking how much he looks like Adrian.

== Other media ==
In the 2012 Broadway musical based on the first Rocky film, Adrian Pennino was portrayed by Margo Seibert.
