= Rocky =

1976 film by John G. Avildsen

- Theatrical release poster
- Directed by: John G. Avildsen
- Written by: Sylvester Stallone
- Produced by: Irwin Winkler; Robert Chartoff
- Starring: Sylvester Stallone; Talia Shire; Burt Young; Carl Weathers; Burgess Meredith
- Cinematography: James Crabe
- Edited by: Richard Halsey; Scott Conrad
- Music by: Bill Conti
- Production company: Chartoff-Winkler Productions
- Distributed by: United Artists
- Release date: November 21, 1976 (New York City)
- Running time: 119 minutes
- Country: United States
- Language: English
- Budget: $1 million
- Box office: $225 million

Rocky is a 1976 American sports drama film directed by John G. Avildsen and written by and starring Sylvester Stallone. It is the first installment in the Rocky film series and also stars Talia Shire, Burt Young, Carl Weathers, and Burgess Meredith. In the film, Rocky Balboa (Stallone), a poor small-time club fighter and loanshark debt collector from Philadelphia, gets an unlikely once in a lifetime shot at the world heavyweight championship held by Apollo Creed (Weathers).

Rocky entered development in March 1975, after Stallone wrote the screenplay in three days. It entered a complicated production process after Stallone refused to allow the film to be made without him in the lead role; United Artists eventually agreed to cast Stallone after he rejected a six figure deal for the film rights. Principal photography began in January 1976, with filming primarily held in Philadelphia; several locations featured in the film, such as the Rocky Steps, are now considered cultural landmarks. With an estimated production budget of about $1 million, Rocky popularized the rags to riches and American Dream themes of sports dramas which preceded the film.

Rocky had its premiere at Cinema II in New York City on November 21, 1976. Rocky became the highest-grossing film of 1976, earning approximately $225 million worldwide. The film received critical acclaim for Stallone's writing, as well as the film's performances, direction, musical score, cinematography and editing; among other accolades, it received ten Academy Award nominations and won three, including Best Picture. It has been ranked by numerous publications as one of the greatest films of all time, as well as one of the most iconic sports films ever.

Rocky and its theme song have become a pop-cultural phenomenon and an important part of 1970s American popular culture. In 2006, the Library of Congress selected Rocky for preservation in the United States National Film Registry as being "culturally, historically or aesthetically significant". The first sequel in the series, Rocky II, was released in 1979.

== Plot ==
To mark the upcoming United States Bicentennial, heavyweight boxing world champion Apollo Creed plans to hold a title bout in Philadelphia. However, he is informed six weeks from the fight date that his scheduled opponent, Mac Lee Green, is unable to compete due to an injured hand. All other potential replacements are either booked or unable to get into shape in time. Having invested heavily into the fight, Apollo decides to give a local contender a chance to challenge him, because without a ranked contender, "what this fight needs is a novelty".

He selects Rocky Balboa, an Italian-American journeyman southpaw boxer living in poverty, who primarily fights in small gyms and works as a collector for a Mafia loan shark. Rocky is chosen on the basis of his nickname, "The Italian Stallion", because Apollo feels that the name is most suitable for marketing purposes. Rocky meets with promoter George Jergens and agrees to the fight, which will pay him $150,000. Rocky puts himself through several weeks of unorthodox and improvised training, such as using sides of beef as punching bags.

He is later approached by Mickey Goldmill, a former bantamweight fighter-turned-trainer whose gym Rocky frequents, about further training. Rocky is not willing initially, as Mickey has not shown much interest in helping him before and saw him as a wasted talent, but eventually he accepts the offer.

Rocky builds a romantic relationship with Adrianna "Adrian" Pennino, a shy woman who is working part-time at the J&M Tropical Fish pet store. Adrian's brother and Rocky's best friend, Paulie, sets his sister up on a date with Rocky. She initially rejects his advances but consents to each subsequent step of the date when he continues to ask. Paulie also offers to work as a cornerman with him for the fight, an offer Rocky turns down. Paulie becomes jealous of Rocky's success, but Rocky placates him by agreeing to advertise the meat packing business where Paulie works as part of the fight. Rocky trains extensively for the match, while Apollo is unconcerned and puts more effort into promotion than training. The night before the match, Rocky visits the Spectrum and begins to lose confidence. He confesses to Adrian that he does not believe he can win but strives to go the distance against Apollo, which no other fighter has done, to prove himself.

On New Year's Day, the fight is held with Apollo making a dramatic entrance dressed as George Washington and then Uncle Sam. Taking advantage of his overconfidence, Rocky knocks him down in the first round—the first time that Apollo has ever been knocked down. Humbled and worried, Apollo takes Rocky more seriously for the rest of the fight, which goes on for the full fifteen rounds, with both combatants sustaining various injuries: Rocky, with hits to the head and swollen eyes, requires his right eyelid to be cut to restore his vision, while Apollo, with internal bleeding and a broken rib, struggles to breathe. As the fight concludes, Apollo's skill is countered by Rocky's stamina, toughness and will. As the final bell sounds, Apollo tells Rocky there "ain't gonna be no rematch". Rocky replies that he does not want one.

As the ring is flooded with reporters and excited fans, Rocky calls out repeatedly for Adrian, who makes her way into the ring. As Jergens declares Apollo the winner by virtue of a split decision, Rocky and Adrian embrace and profess their love for each other, unconcerned with the outcome of the fight.

== Cast ==
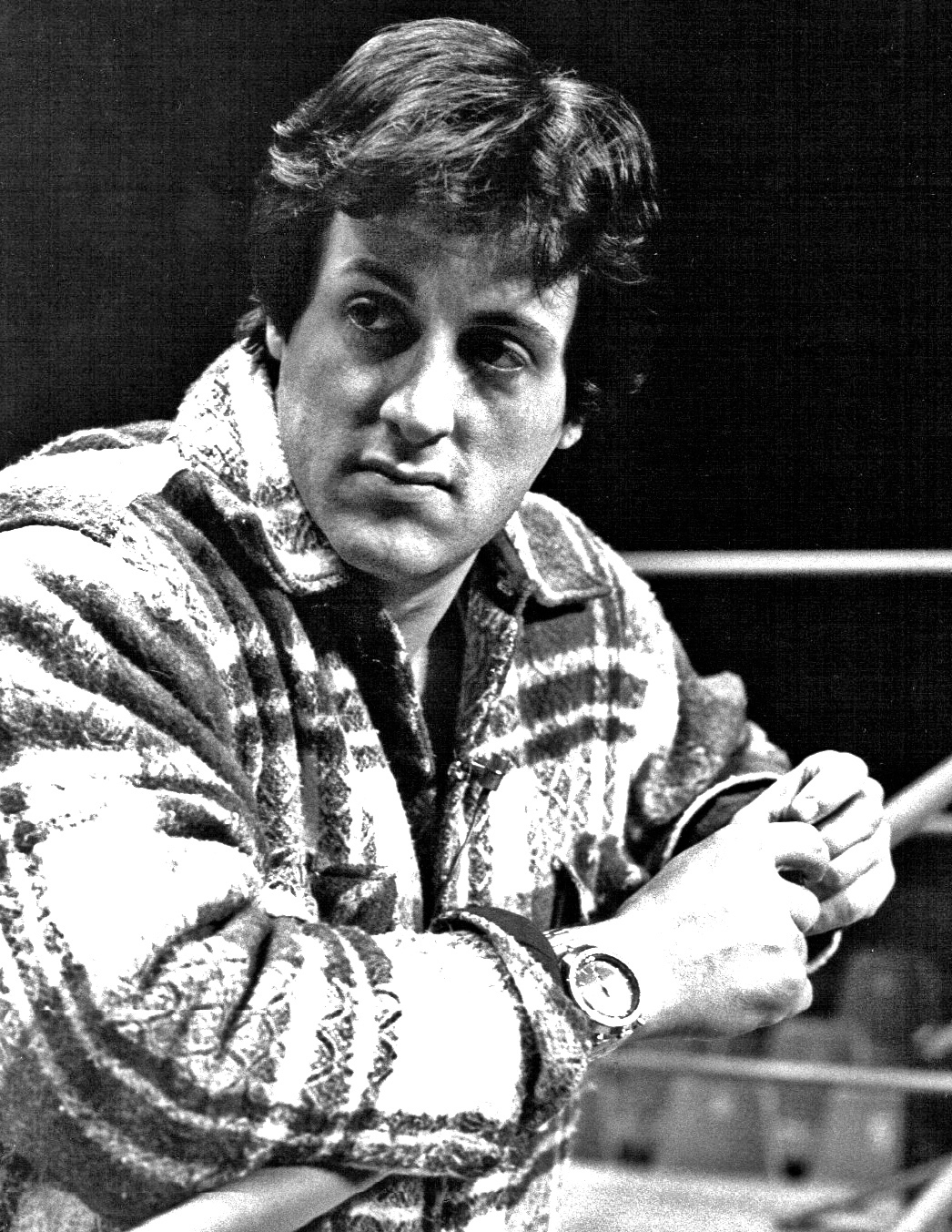
Sylvester Stallone in 1977

- Sylvester Stallone as Robert "Rocky" Balboa
- Talia Shire as Adrianna "Adrian" Pennino
- Burt Young as Paulie Pennino
- Carl Weathers as Apollo Creed
- Burgess Meredith as Michael "Mickey" Goldmill
- Thayer David as George "Miles" Jergens
- Joe Spinell as Tony Gazzo
- Jimmy Gambina as Mike
- Tony Burton as Tony "Duke" Evers
- Pedro Lovell as Spider Rico
- Stan Shaw as "Big Dipper" Brown
- Jodi Letizia as Marie
- Frank Stallone as Streetcorner Singer
- Joe Frazier as Himself

== Production ==
=== Development and writing ===
Sylvester Stallone wrote the screenplay for Rocky in three and a half days, shortly after watching the championship match between Muhammad Ali and Chuck Wepner that took place at Richfield Coliseum in Richfield, Ohio, on March 24, 1975. Wepner was TKO'd in the 15th round of the match by Ali, with few expecting him to last as long as he did. Despite the match motivating Stallone to begin work on Rocky, he has denied Wepner provided any inspiration for the script. Other inspiration for the film may have included characteristics of real-life boxers Rocky Marciano and Joe Frazier, as well as Rocky Graziano's autobiography Somebody Up There Likes Me and the movie of the same name. Wepner sued Stallone, and eventually settled for an undisclosed amount.

Henry Winkler, Stallone's co-star in The Lords of Flatbush who then broke out as Arthur Fonzarelli on ABC's Happy Days, said he had taken the script to executives at the network. They expressed interest in turning it into a made-for-television movie and actually bought the script but insisted that someone else rewrite it. Upon hearing the news, Stallone begged Winkler not to let ABC change writers, so Winkler went back to the executives and offered to return the money in exchange for the rights. While ABC refused at first, Winkler said he was able to use his status as one of its biggest stars at the time to convince them to sell the rights back.

At the time, Film Artists Management Enterprises (FAME), a joint venture between Hollywood talent agents Craig T. Rumar and Larry Kubik, represented Stallone. He submitted his script to Rumar and Kubik, who immediately saw the potential for it to be made into a motion picture. They shopped the script to various producers and studios in Hollywood but were repeatedly rejected because Stallone insisted that he be cast in the lead role. Eventually, they secured a meeting with Winkler-Chartoff productions (no relation to Henry Winkler). After repeated negotiations with Rumar and Kubik, Winkler-Chartoff agreed to a contract for Stallone to be the writer and also star in the lead role for Rocky. Stallone offered the script to Ralph Bakshi to direct, because he loved Bakshi's 1973 film Heavy Traffic, but Bakshi turned it down because he didn't want to leave animation, and John G. Avildsen signed on to direct instead.

United Artists liked Stallone's script and viewed it as a vehicle for a well-established star like Robert Redford, Ryan O'Neal, Burt Reynolds, or James Caan. United Artists initially thought the project was going to be a disaster. Stallone's agents insisted that Stallone portray the title character, to the point of issuing an ultimatum. Stallone later said that he would never have forgiven himself had the film become a success with somebody else in the lead. He also knew that producers Irwin Winkler and Robert Chartoff's contract with the studio enabled them to "greenlight" a project if the budget was kept low enough. The producers also collateralized any possible losses with their big-budget entry, New York, New York (whose eventual losses were covered by Rocky's success). The film's production budget ended up being $1,075,000, with a further $100,000 spent on producers' fees and $4.2 million on advertising costs.

=== Pre-production ===
Although Chartoff and Irwin Winkler were enthusiastic about the script and the idea of Stallone playing the lead character, they were hesitant about having an unknown headline the film. The producers also had trouble casting other major characters in the story, with Apollo Creed and Adrian cast unusually late by the production standards. Real-life boxer Ken Norton was initially sought for the role of Apollo Creed, but he pulled out and the role was ultimately given to Carl Weathers. Norton, upon whom Creed was loosely based, fought Muhammad Ali three times. According to The Rocky Scrapbook, Carrie Snodgress was originally chosen to play Adrian, but a money dispute forced the producers to look elsewhere. Susan Sarandon and Cher auditioned for the role but Sarandon was deemed too pretty for the character and Cher too expensive. After Talia Shire's ensuing audition, Chartoff and Winkler, and director John Avildsen, insisted that she play the part.

Philadelphia-based boxer Joe Frazier has a cameo appearance in the film. Frazier has claimed that some of the plot's most memorable moments—Rocky's carcass-punching scenes and Rocky running up the steps of the Philadelphia Museum of Art as part of his training regimen—are taken without credit from his own real-life exploits.

Ali, the outspoken boxer and one of Frazier's main rivals who had fought him three times (the last, the Thrilla in Manila, being the year before the film was released), influenced the character of Apollo Creed. At the 49th Academy Awards, Ali, at the time in his second reign as the real-life world heavyweight champion, was a surprise presenter alongside Stallone for Best Supporting Actress. Ali told Stallone, "I'm the real Apollo Creed!" They had a lighthearted confrontation onstage to show the film did not offend Ali before presenting the award to Beatrice Straight for Network.

Because of the film's comparatively low budget, members of Stallone's family played minor roles. His father rings the bell to signal the start and end of a round; his brother Frank plays a street corner singer, and his first wife, Sasha, was stills photographer. Other cameos include former Philadelphia and then Los Angeles television sportscaster Stu Nahan playing himself, alongside radio and TV broadcaster Bill Baldwin; and Lloyd Kaufman, founder of the independent film company Troma, appearing as a drunk. Diana Lewis, then a news anchor in Los Angeles and later in Detroit, has a minor scene as a TV news reporter. Tony Burton appears as Apollo Creed's trainer, Tony "Duke" Evers, a role he would reprise throughout the entire Rocky series, though the character is not named until Rocky II. Michael Dorn, who would later gain fame as the Klingon Worf in Star Trek: The Next Generation and Star Trek: Deep Space Nine, made his acting debut, albeit uncredited, as Creed's bodyguard.

=== Filming ===
Principal photography for Rocky began on January 9, 1976. Filming took place primarily throughout Philadelphia, with a few scenes shot in Los Angeles. Rocky's house was located at 1818 East Tusculum Street in the Kensington neighborhood of North Philadelphia. Inventor Garrett Brown's new Steadicam was used to accomplish smooth photography while running alongside Rocky during the film's Philadelphia street training sequences and the run up the Art Museum's flight of stairs, now colloquially known as the Rocky Steps. It was also used for some shots in the fight scenes and can be seen at the ringside during some wide shots of the final fight. Rocky is often erroneously cited as the first film to use the Steadicam, although it was actually the third, after Bound for Glory and Marathon Man.

Certain elements of the story were altered during filming. The original script had a darker tone: Mickey was portrayed as racist, and the script ended with Rocky throwing the fight after realizing he did not want to be part of the professional boxing world after all.

Both Stallone and Weathers suffered injuries during the shooting of the final fight; Stallone suffered bruised ribs and Weathers suffered a damaged nose, the opposite injuries of what their characters had.

The first date between Rocky and Adrian, in which Rocky bribes a janitor to allow them to skate after closing hours on a deserted ice skating rink, was shot that way due to budgetary concerns — the scene was originally scheduled to be shot in a public skating rink during regular business hours, but the producers decided they could not afford the hundreds of extras that would have been required.

The poster seen above the ring before Rocky fights Apollo Creed shows Rocky wearing red shorts with a white stripe when he actually wears white shorts with a red stripe. When Rocky points this out, promoter George Jergens tells him that it "doesn't really matter, does it?". Avildsen said this was an actual mistake made by the props department that they could not afford to rectify, so the brief scene was written to ensure the audience did not see it as a goof. Conversely, Stallone has said he was indeed supposed to wear red shorts with a white stripe as Rocky, but changed to the opposite colors "at the last moment". Similarly, when Rocky's robe arrived far too baggy on the day it was needed for filming, Stallone wrote in dialogue where Rocky points this out.

== Music ==
=== Soundtrack ===
Bill Conti composed the musical score for Rocky. He had composed a score for director John G. Avildsen's W.W. and the Dixie Dancekings (1975) that the studio ultimately rejected. David Shire (then-husband of Talia Shire) was the first to be offered the chance to compose the music for Rocky but had to turn it down because of prior commitments. Avildsen reached out to Conti without any studio help because of the film's relatively low budget. Avildsen said, "The budget for the music was 25 grand. And that was for everything: The composer's fee, that was to pay the musicians, that was to rent the studio, that was to buy the tape that it was going to be recorded on."

The main theme song, "Gonna Fly Now", made it to number one on Billboard magazine's Hot 100 list for one week (from July 2 to July 8, 1977) and the American Film Institute placed it 58th on its AFI's 100 Years...100 Songs. United Artists Records released the soundtrack album on November 12, 1976. EMI re-released the album on CD and cassette.

Frank Stallone's song "Take You Back" is also on the soundtrack, and he also sings the song in the movie with other friends around a trash can fire.

== Release ==
=== Theatrical ===
The movie opened on Sunday, November 21, 1976 at Cinema II in New York City. It then opened at the Plaza in Westwood, Los Angeles on December 1, 1976. It went into general release on December 3, 1976, opening in metropolitan centers before Christmas and going wide across the United States and Canada in late January and early February 1977.

On November 5, 2026, Sylvester Stallone and Bill Conti, composer of Rocky's famous theme song reunited at Brooklyn New York's Kings Theatre for Rocky's 50th anniversary.

=== Television ===
CBS paid $7.5 million for two showings of the film on US television, with the first on February 4, 1979. The film was the most watched of the night with a rating of 36.9, representing 27.5 million homes.

=== Home media ===
- 1980 UK video release by Intervision Betamax, VHS (Rental Only)
- 1982 – CED Videodisc, Betamax and VHS; VHS release is rental only; 20th Century Fox Video release, Warner Home Video has rest of the World rights
- October 27, 1990 (VHS and LaserDisc)
- April 16, 1996 (VHS and LaserDisc)
- March 24, 1997 (DVD)
- April 24, 2001 (DVD, also packed with the Five-Disc Boxed Set)
- 2001 (VHS, 25th anniversary edition)
- December 14, 2004 (DVD, also packed with the Rocky Anthology box set)
- February 8, 2005 (DVD, also packed with the Rocky Anthology box set)
- December 5, 2006 (DVD and Blu-ray Disc – 2-Disc Collector's Edition, the DVD was the first version released by Fox and was also packed with the Rocky Anthology box set and the Blu-ray was the first version released by 20th Century Fox Home Entertainment)
- December 4, 2007 (DVD box set – Rocky The Complete Saga. This new set contains the new Rocky Balboa, but does not include the recent 2 disc Rocky. There are still no special features for Rocky II through Rocky V, although Rocky Balboa's DVD special features are all intact.)
- November 3, 2009 (Blu-ray box set – Rocky The Undisputed Collection. This release included six films in a box set. Previously, only the first film and Rocky Balboa were available on the format. Those two discs are identical to their individual releases, and the set also contains a disc of bonus material, new and old alike.)
- May 6, 2014 – Blu-ray re-release with an all new 4K remaster and the previous special features of the old release.
- October 13, 2015 – Blu-ray box set, Rocky Heavyweight Collection 40th Anniversary Edition. All six films plus over three hours of bonus material, including the 4K remaster of the first film.

== Reception ==
=== Box office ===
Rocky grossed $5,488 on its opening day at Cinema II, a house record. It grossed $39,030 in its first 8 days. On January 19, 1977, Rocky expanded into 59 New York and New Jersey theaters where it grossed $1,035,688 for the week, propelling it to number one in the United States in its ninth week of release. The week saw the end of its nine-week run at Cinema II where it had grossed $231,141. Five days later, it grossed a further $600,000 in the New York area and its overall gross from 163 theaters nationwide was $6 million. It remained at number one for nine consecutive weeks. After six weeks at number one, it had grossed $22 million from 300-500 prints. It was displaced at number one by Airport '77 but returned to number one the following week after it won the Academy Award for Best Picture, where it remained for a further 4 weeks. When it was released nationally, it grossed $5 million during its first wide weekend. It consistently performed well for eight months and eventually reached $117 million at the US and Canadian box office. Adjusted for inflation in 2018, the film earned over $500 million in the US and Canada alone. Overseas, Rocky grossed $107 million, for a worldwide box office total of $225 million. With its production budget of about $1 million, Rocky is notable for its worldwide percentage return of over 11,000 percent. It was the highest-grossing film released in 1976 in the United States and Canada and the second highest-grossing film of 1977, behind Star Wars.

=== Critical response ===
On the review aggregator Rotten Tomatoes, the film holds a 95% approval rating based on 141 reviews, with an average rating of 8.6/10. The site's critics consensus states: "This story of a down-on-his-luck boxer is thoroughly predictable, but Sylvester Stallone's script and stunning performance in the title role brush aside complaints." Metacritic, which uses a weighted average, assigned the film a score of 73 out of 100, based on 14 critics, indicating "generally favorable" reviews.

Rocky received positive reviews at the time of its release. Roger Ebert of the Chicago Sun-Times gave it 4 out of 4 stars and said that Stallone reminded him of "the young Marlon Brando." Box Office Magazine claimed audiences would be "touting Sylvester 'Sly' Stallone as a new star". Frank Rich liked the film, calling it "almost 100 per cent schmaltz", but favoring it over the cynicism that was prevalent in movies at that time, although he referred to the plot as "gimmicky" and the script "heavy-handed". Several reviews, including Richard Eder's (as well as Canby's negative review), compared the work to that of Frank Capra.

The film did not escape criticism. Vincent Canby, of The New York Times, called it "pure '30s make believe" and dismissed both Stallone's acting and Avildsen's directing, calling the latter "none too decisive". Andrew Sarris found the Capra comparisons disingenuous: "Capra's movies projected more despair deep down than a movie like Rocky could envisage, and most previous ring movies have been much more cynical about the fight scene"; commenting on Rocky's work for a loan shark, Sarris says the film "teeters on the edge of sentimentalizing gangsters". He found Meredith "oddly cast in the kind of part the late James Gleason used to pick his teeth".

=== Accolades ===
Award	Category	Nominee(s)	Result	Ref.
Academy Awards	Best Picture	Robert Chartoff and Irwin Winkler	Won	
Academy Awards	Best Director	John G. Avildsen	Won	
Academy Awards	Best Actor	Sylvester Stallone	Nominated	
Academy Awards	Best Actress	Talia Shire	Nominated	
Academy Awards	Best Supporting Actor	Burgess Meredith	Nominated	
Academy Awards	Best Supporting Actor	Burt Young	Nominated	
Academy Awards	Best Original Screenplay	Sylvester Stallone	Nominated	
Academy Awards	Best Film Editing	Richard Halsey and Scott Conrad	Won	
Academy Awards	Best Original Song	"Gonna Fly Now"; Music by Bill Conti; Lyrics by Carol Connors and Ayn Robbins	Nominated	
Academy Awards	Best Sound	Harry Warren Tetrick, (Note: Posthumous nomination.) William McCaughey, Lyle J. Burbridge, and Bud Alper	Nominated	
British Academy Film Awards	Best Film	John G. Avildsen	Nominated	
British Academy Film Awards	Best Direction	John G. Avildsen	Nominated	
British Academy Film Awards	Best Actor in a Leading Role	Sylvester Stallone	Nominated	
British Academy Film Awards	Best Screenplay	Sylvester Stallone	Nominated	
British Academy Film Awards	Best Editing	Richard Halsey	Nominated	
Golden Globe Awards	Best Motion Picture – Drama		Won	
Golden Globe Awards	Best Actor in a Motion Picture – Drama	Sylvester Stallone	Nominated	
Golden Globe Awards	Best Actress in a Motion Picture – Drama	Talia Shire	Nominated	
Golden Globe Awards	Best Director	John G. Avildsen	Nominated	
Golden Globe Awards	Best Screenplay	Sylvester Stallone	Nominated	
Golden Globe Awards	Best Original Score	Bill Conti	Nominated	

=== Legacy ===
The Directors Guild of America awarded Rocky its annual award for best film of the year in 1976. Additionally, the Directors Guild voted Rocky as the 65th best-directed film of all time in 2016, and in 2006, Sylvester Stallone's original screenplay for the film was selected by the Writers Guild of America as the 78th best screenplay of all time. In a 2012 survey of members of the Motion Picture Editors Guild, Rocky was voted as one of the 75 best-edited films in all of cinema.

In 2006, the Library of Congress selected Rocky for preservation in the United States National Film Registry for being "culturally, historically or aesthetically significant".

In 1998, the American Film Institute (AFI) ranked Rocky as the 78th best film in American cinema. The film's ranking rose to No. 57 on AFI's 10th anniversary edition of the list in 2007. Additionally, in June 2008, AFI revealed its 10 Top 10—the best ten films in ten "classic" American film genres—after polling over 1,500 people from the creative community. Rocky was acknowledged as the second-best film in the sports genre, after Raging Bull.

Film scholar Steven J. Schneider included Rocky in his book 1001 Movies You Must See Before You Die, writing that the film is "often overlooked as schmaltz". Filmsite.org, a subsidiary of American Movie Classics, included the film on their list of the 300 greatest films of all time. Additionally, Films101.com ranked the film as the 228th best of all time.

In 2006, British film magazine Total Film ranked Rocky at No. 71 on their list of the 100 greatest films of all time. Based on their 2020 readers' poll, the film ranked No. 60 on Rolling Stone Australia's "100 Greatest Movies of All Time". Additionally, Rolling Stone magazine ranked Rocky at No. 2 on their list of the 30 greatest sports films.

In 2022, Esquire included the film on their list of "The 100 Best Movies of All Time". Esquire also included both Rocky and its spinoff sequel Creed on their list of "The 30 Best Sports Movies of All Time". In 2023, Slashfilm included Rocky on their list of the "Top 100 Movies of All Time", as voted by a selection of their writers and editors. In 2024, entertainment news site Comic Book Resources ranked the film No. 23 on their list of the "55 Best Movies of All Time", while Parade magazine ranked the film No. 45 on their list of the "100 Best Movies of All Time".

In 2014, Rocky was ranked No. 95 by British film magazine Empire on their list of "The 301 Greatest Movies of All Time", It was ranked No. 370 on their previous list of the 500 greatest films in 2008. Conversely, in a 2005 poll by Empire, Rocky was No. 9 on their list of "The Top 10 Worst Pictures to Win Best Picture Oscar".

In June 2014, The Hollywood Reporter compiled a list of the 100 best movies ever made, polling film industry insiders on their favorite films of all time. Rocky ranked No. 91. The following year The Hollywood Reporter polled hundreds of Academy members, asking them to re-vote on past controversial decisions. Academy members indicated that, given a second chance, they would award the 1977 Oscar for Best Picture to All the President's Men instead.

Time Out ranked Rocky No. 1 on their list of the "50 Best Sports Movies of All Time". On their list of "The 50 Greatest Sports Movies of All Time", entertainment news website Vulture ranked Rocky at No. 3. In 2015, Thrillist compiled a list of "The 1001 Best Movies of All Time" by weighing ratings from IMDb, Rotten Tomatoes, Metacritic and Letterboxd. Rocky ranked No. 589.

In 2021, the film ranked 2nd on ESPN's "Top 20 Sports Movies of All-Time". In 2024, Forbes magazine ranked Rocky No. 1 on their list of "The 42 Greatest Sports Movies of All Time".

British film site CinemaBlend ranked Rocky and Creed No. 1 and No. 17 respectively on their list of "The 25 Best Sports Movies". On their list of "100 Best Movies of All Time", entertainment news website Collider ranked Rocky No. 94, and on their list of "The 30 Greatest Sports Movies of All Time", Collider ranked the film No. 2. On their list of the "Top 25 Sports Movies of All Time", entertainment news website MovieWeb ranked Rocky No. 4. MovieWeb also ranked the film No. 3 on their list of the "20 Movies That Represent American Culture".

On their list of "The 150 Best Sports Movies of All Time", Rotten Tomatoes ranked Rocky No. 17 and Creed No. 2. Men's Health included Rocky on their list of the "50 of the Absolute Best Sports Movies Ever Made". British GQ ranked the film No. 1 on their list of "The 22 Best Sports Movies".

=== Year-end lists ===
Rocky has also appeared on several of the American Film Institute's 100 Years lists.

- AFI's 100 Years... 100 Movies (1998) – No. 78
- AFI's 100 Years... 100 Thrills (2001) – No. 52
- AFI's 100 Years... 100 Passions (2002) – Nominated
- AFI's 100 Years... 100 Heroes and Villains (2003)
  - Rocky Balboa – No. 7 Hero
- AFI's 100 Years...100 Songs (2004)
  - "Gonna Fly Now" – No. 58
- AFI's 100 Years... 100 Movie Quotes (2005)
  - "Yo, Adrian!" – No. 80
- AFI's 100 Years of Film Scores (2005) – Nominated
- AFI's 100 Years... 100 Cheers (2006) – No. 4
- AFI's 100 Years... 100 Movies (10th Anniversary Edition) (2007) – No. 57
- AFI's 10 Top 10 (2008) – No. 2 Sports Film

== Franchise ==
=== Sequels ===
Stallone had written a draft of a screenplay for a sequel by the time of Rocky's Oscar success. After winning the Academy Award for Best Picture, Stallone said that he wanted to make several more and play Rocky in his 40s and 50s. The films' success eventually led to eight sequels, beginning with Rocky II in 1979, followed by Rocky III in 1982, Rocky IV in 1985, Rocky V in 1990, and Rocky Balboa in 2006, the latter released when Stallone was 60.

=== Spin-off series ===
A series of spin-off films starring Michael B. Jordan began with Creed in 2015, followed by Creed II in 2018. Another sequel, titled Creed III, was released in 2023; however, Stallone did not appear in this installment.

=== Possible prequel and I Play Rocky ===
In July 2019, Stallone said in an interview that there have been ongoing discussions about a prequel to the original film based on the life of a young Rocky Balboa.

I Play Rocky, a biopic which chronicles the making of the first film, was released on November 6th, 2026.

== Other media ==
=== Rocky Steps ===
Rocky running up the front steps of the Philadelphia Museum of Art. The scene became a cultural icon of the 1970s, with the steps becoming eponymously known as the "Rocky steps."

The famous scene of Rocky running up the steps of the Philadelphia Museum of Art has become a cultural icon, with the steps acquiring the vernacular title of "Rocky Steps". In 1982, a statue of Rocky, commissioned by Stallone for Rocky III, was placed at the top of the Rocky Steps. City Commerce Director Dick Doran claimed that Stallone and Rocky had done more for the city's image than "anyone since Ben Franklin".

Differing opinions of the statue and its placement led to a relocation to the sidewalk outside the Spectrum Arena, although the statue was temporarily returned to the top of the steps in 1990 for Rocky V, and again in 2006 for the 30th anniversary of the original Rocky (although this time it was placed at the bottom of the steps). Later that year, it was moved permanently to a spot next to the steps.

The scene is frequently parodied in other media. In the 2008 movie You Don't Mess with the Zohan, Zohan's nemesis, Phantom, goes through a parody training sequence finishing with him running up a desert dune and raising his hands in victory. In the fourth-season finale of The Fresh Prince of Bel-Air, as the credits roll at the end of the episode, Will is seen running up the steps at the Philadelphia Museum of Art; however, as he celebrates after finishing his climb, he passes out in exhaustion, and while he lies unconscious on the ground, a pickpocket steals his wallet and his wool hat. In The Nutty Professor, there is a scene where Sherman Klump (Eddie Murphy) struggles to, and eventually succeeds at, running up a lengthy flight of steps on his college campus, victoriously throwing punches at the top.

In 2006, E! named the "Rocky Steps" scene number 13 on its 101 Most Awesome Moments in Entertainment list.

During the 1996 Summer Olympics torch relay, Philadelphia native Dawn Staley was chosen to run up the museum steps. In 2004, presidential candidate John Kerry ended his pre-convention campaign at the foot of the steps before going to Boston to accept his party's nomination for president.

=== Novelization ===
Upon the film's release, a paperback novelization of the screenplay written by Rosalyn Drexler under the pseudonym Julia Sorel and published by Ballantine Books was released.

=== Video games ===
Several video games have been produced based on the film. Rocky was released in 1987 for the Master System. Rocky was released in 2002 for the GameCube, Game Boy Advance, PlayStation 2, and Xbox, and a sequel, Rocky Legends, was released in 2004 for the PlayStation 2 and Xbox. In 2016, Tapinator released a mobile game named ROCKY for the iOS platform, with a planned 2017 release for Google Play and Amazon platforms.

=== Musical ===
A musical was written by Stephen Flaherty and Lynn Ahrens (lyrics and music), with the book by Thomas Meehan, based on the film. The musical premiered in Hamburg, Germany in October 2012. It began performances at the Winter Garden Theater on Broadway on February 11, 2014, and officially opened on March 13, 2014.

=== Documentaries ===
Rocky is featured in the 2017 documentary John G. Avildsen: King of the Underdogs about Academy Award-winning Rocky director John G. Avildsen, directed and produced by Derek Wayne Johnson.

Stallone later hand-picked Johnson to direct and produce a documentary on the making of the original Rocky, entitled 40 Years of Rocky: The Birth of a Classic, which was released in 2020. The documentary features Stallone narrating behind-the-scenes footage from the making of the film.

=== Parodies ===
Rocky has been parodied a lot over the years, even getting a feature length spoof called Ricky 1 in 1988. In 1986, Finnish director Aki Kaurismäki made an 8-minute spoof of Rocky IV called Rocky VI.

=== National Museum of American history ===
The red satin robe and black hat worn by Stallone in Rocky are featured in the National Museum of American History. Likewise, the red gloves worn by Stallone in Rocky II (1979), his white Nike boxing shoes, and striped boxing trunks from Rocky III (1981) are archived at the museum. All items were on display for a temporary period following Stallone's donation in 2006, and have since been moved to the museum archives.

== See also ==
- List of boxing films
- I Play Rocky
