= Apollo Creed =

Fictional character from the Rocky franchise

Apollo Creed The Master of Disaster
- Rocky character
- Carl Weathers as Apollo Creed in Rocky IV
- First appearance: Rocky (1976)
- Last appearance: Big Rumble Boxing: Creed Champions (2021)
- Created by: Sylvester Stallone
- Portrayed by: Carl Weathers; Stephan James (I Play Rocky)

In-universe information
- Nicknames: The Dancing Destroyer; The King of Sting; The Count of Monte Fisto; The Thane of Pain; The Prince of Punch; The Master of Disaster; The One and Only
- Title: Undisputed World Heavyweight Champion
- Occupation: Boxer; Boxing trainer
- Spouse: Mary Anne Creed
- Children: Adonis "Donnie" Creed; Unnamed other son Unnamed daughter
- Relatives: Amara Creed (granddaughter); Bianca Creed (daughter-in-law)

Apollo Creed is a fictional boxer from the Rocky franchise, portrayed by Carl Weathers. He appears in the first four Rocky films, serving as the main antagonist in Rocky and Rocky II, and later becoming one of the protagonists in Rocky III and Rocky IV. Sylvester Stallone, the writer and star of the Rocky series, stated that Jack Johnson and Muhammad Ali were the inspirations for the character of Creed. Protagonist Rocky Balboa – Creed's rival in Rocky and Rocky II – faces underdog odds, but he views Creed with respect, pointedly refusing the prodding of a reporter to trash-talk him, even after he publicly taunts Balboa by remarking "he's great."

In Rocky, Creed cleans out his division of serious challengers but decides to fight Balboa for the fan spectacle as well as for the implied symbolism of fighting a man with an Italian background. In the sequel film Rocky II, Balboa and Creed find themselves evenly matched in the ring, becoming friends in Rocky III. Creed had many nicknames, including "The King of Sting", "The Dancing Destroyer", "The Prince of Punch", "The Count of Monte Fisto", and most prominently "The Master of Disaster".

== Role in the series ==
=== Rocky (1976) ===
Apollo Creed first appears in the 1976 Oscar-winning film Rocky as the charismatic, intelligent, and undefeated nearly 33-year-old World Heavyweight Champion. A planned bicentennial fight against number-one contender Mac Lee Green is scheduled for January 1, 1976; however, Green hurts his left hand in training, and other top-ranked contenders are either busy or claim they do not have enough time to get in shape. A frustrated Creed is unwilling to waste the time, effort, and money he's already invested in the fight, so he comes up with a novel idea he believes will generate publicity – he will offer an unknown local fighter an opportunity to battle for the title in a match in Philadelphia.

Upon reviewing the local boxers in Philadelphia, Creed is drawn to a club fighter named Rocky Balboa, an Italian with a catchy nickname, "The Italian Stallion". Creed explains his interest in Rocky by saying, "Who discovered America? An Italian, right? What better way to celebrate its 200th birthday than to get it on with one of his descendants?" Creed brushes off his manager Tony "Duke" Evers' warning that he should not fight the left-handed Rocky, pledging to knock him out in three rounds. Despite Duke showing concern when he sees Balboa in a television interview punching sides of beef in a meat-packing plant, Creed puts more effort into giving everyone a good show than training for the bout.

When the match takes place, Creed dresses up as both George Washington and Uncle Sam in the pre-fight festivities (with his matching trademark stars-and-stripes boxing shorts) and is in a jovial mood until Balboa knocks him down in the first round with a single uppercut, the first time Creed is knocked down in his career. He then endures a grueling 15-round fight with Balboa, who gets to his feet after Creed takes him down in the 14th round, which appeared to be the end of the match. This was the first time anyone had ever taken the champion the full 15 rounds. Duke suggests stopping the fight at one point, but Creed refuses.

Both fighters are beaten, bloodied, and bruised by the end of the bout – Balboa with severe eye damage and Creed with internal bleeding in his abdomen. Creed gains a controversial split decision victory.

=== Rocky II (1979) ===
In the second film, despite promising there would not be a rematch, Creed demands a rematch against Balboa while in the hospital emergency room. Public opinion in the film is that Creed fixed the fight against Balboa to retain his title, which leads to Creed's intensified desire for a rematch against the pleas of Duke, who tells him to "let it go". Creed challenges Balboa to a second fight on Thanksgiving 1976. By this time, Balboa had retired from boxing after being discharged from the hospital from his first fight and had married his girlfriend Adrian. Creed, still 33 years old, uses various humiliation tactics to coax Balboa out of retirement, which he accomplishes when Balboa and his trainer, Mickey Goldmill, accept the rematch. Creed taunts Balboa at the press conference, insisting that he will "drop him like a bad habit" and telling Balboa as he leaves, "Come November, you're mine!" In a press interview during training, he also insists that Balboa "cannot last five minutes in the ring with a superior athlete like [him]." Creed trains harder than ever before with the intention of punishing Balboa for the embarrassment he caused 11 months earlier. Mickey trains Rocky to become faster, using unusual methods like chasing and catching a chicken. He also instructs him to change his boxing stance from left-handed to right-handed to confuse Creed and to protect his damaged right eye.

Unlike their first fight, Creed dominates Balboa throughout most of the second fight, thwarting Rocky's strategy of fighting right-handed. Despite this, he is unable to make good on his promise of an early knockout victory, as Rocky absorbs his punches and manages to get up both times after being knocked down. By the final round, Creed is well ahead on points but is fatigued, and it is apparent that he cannot knock Balboa out. Creed takes a beating from Balboa. Not wanting a repeat of the first fight and ignoring the desperate pleas of Duke to stay away and fight from distance, he vows to knock Balboa out rather than take the safer route by winning on points. At the beginning of the 15th round, he tells Rocky, "You're going down," to which Balboa replies, "No way." After going toe-to-toe for much of the final round, Creed is knocked down by Balboa, with Balboa falling down in exhaustion as well. Balboa gets up by the count of 9, but Creed is unable to pull himself up and is counted out, losing the match and the championship by knockout, his first professional loss.

Creed retires from boxing soon after. Despite the loss, he regains the respect of the public, as he lost in a fair fight. The fight also results in Creed finally acknowledging Balboa's ability as a fighter, rather than seeing him as a fluke.

=== Rocky III (1982) ===
In the third film, a 39-year-old Apollo Creed appears at the first fight between James "Clubber" Lang, 28, and Rocky Balboa, 35, as a guest commentator. Before the match, the former champion Creed steps into the ring to greet the fighters. When he offers Lang a handshake, the latter slaps away Creed's hand and mockingly insists that he "don't want no has-been messin' in my corner." Lang further taunts and laughs at Creed, prompting him to tell Balboa to "give everybody a present and drop this chump." Following the match, in which Lang wins by a second-round knockout, Balboa's manager, Mickey, dies in the locker room. Determined in part to put Lang in his place, Creed finds an apprehensive and bereaved Balboa at Mickey's gym. Despite hesitating at first, Balboa agrees to let Creed train him for a rematch against Lang, who laughs off the prospect of "one has-been teaching another" during a television interview.

The pair subsequently travel to the Tough Gym in Los Angeles, where Creed used to train, in preparation for the rematch alongside Duke. Creed encourages Rocky not to ignore the naysayers who say he is too old but to refocus instead. During this talk, he states, "Now when we fought... you had that eye of the tiger". This quote is referred to throughout the movie, including the film's theme song, "Eye of the Tiger" by Survivor. Creed mentions that Rocky will owe him "a big favor" once he wins. Rocky's training is geared toward making him quicker and more agile to counter the larger, stronger brawler. Creed even teaches his own fighting style to Rocky. Rocky has trouble concentrating during his training, suffering from guilt over Mickey's demise and self-doubt. Adrian helps Rocky recognize this as a simple fear of losing again and convinces him that he can't let fear control his life and that he has to fight again, not to prove a point, but to live without fear. Creed helps Rocky rediscover the motivation, which he had lost in the time leading up to the Lang fight, that had won him the title. Creed calls this motivation the "eye of the tiger."

Before the match begins, Creed expresses his confidence that Rocky will win. He gives Rocky his signature colors – his stars and stripes boxing trunks – to wear during the fight. Just before the fight, Lang mocks Creed again and shoves him, nearly starting a brawl. Re-energized with Creed shadow boxing in his corner, Rocky regains his title with a three-round knockout of Lang. After his victory, Rocky honours Creed's favor: a third fight together, this time not as a bloody fight between bitter rivals, but a private sparring match between friends, which Rocky happily accepts. The film ends as they each throw punches at the same time, symbolizing the equality of their greatness. The result is not revealed until the 2015 film Creed, in which Rocky tells Creed's son, Adonis, that his father won the fight.

=== Rocky IV (1985) ===
In 1985, Creed, now 43 years old, comes out of a five-year retirement to fight mammoth Soviet Olympic boxer Ivan Drago, who has come to the United States on behalf of the Soviet Union to enter the world of professional boxing. Not wanting the Soviets to appear superior to American fighters, Creed challenges Drago to an exhibition match and calls out Drago at the press conference that sets up their exhibition bout in the Jubilee showroom at the first MGM Grand in Las Vegas, on August 31, 1985.

Highlighted by a pre-match rendition of "Living in America" by James Brown, Creed enters the arena from a descending scaffold overhead, dancing to the music in a red, white, and blue Uncle Sam outfit. With Rocky, Duke, and Paulie in his corner, Creed is overly confident that he can dispose of Drago with ease, but he is not ready for the extreme size and strength of the Russian. After taunting Drago and landing a number of ineffectual punches, Creed is pummeled badly in the first round. Rocky wants to stop the fight but Creed refuses, telling Rocky not to stop the fight "no matter what!"

At the start of the second round, Drago pummels Creed with ease. Rocky again tries to stop the fight by throwing in the towel, but hesitates too long, giving Drago a chance to deliver a fatal blow to Creed, who dies in Rocky's arms in the middle of the ring. An enraged Rocky then sets out to avenge Creed's death by challenging Drago himself and agrees to an unsanctioned 15-round bout in the Soviet Union. Rocky again wears Creed's stars-and-stripes boxing trunks. He succeeds as the film ends with Rocky winning the fight by knockout in the last round, with the Soviet premier and the Politburo looking on.

=== Rocky V (1990) ===
With his character's death, Carl Weathers departed the franchise after Rocky IV. In Rocky V, the fifth installment of the series, immediately after Rocky defeats Drago, Creed's trainer Duke praises Rocky on his victory, saying that he made everyone proud, especially Creed, by holding up his red, white, and blue trunks. Creed is thereafter only mentioned briefly in the past tense, including a flashback scene between Mickey and Rocky before Balboa's first fight with Creed, in which Mickey says, "Apollo won't know what hit him." Rocky's pupil Tommy Gunn claims to have been a fan of Rocky since his first fight with Creed. Gunn is eventually allowed to wear Creed's trunks. There was a poster of Creed and Rocky during the events of Rocky II in Rocky Jr.'s bedroom before the Balboas went bankrupt. During Gunn's fight with Union Cane, Rocky comments that it is like his own first fight with Creed. Later, during Rocky's street fight with Gunn, he begins to hallucinate and sees images of Creed's death at the hands of Drago, believing that he is about to suffer the same fate. However, a vision of Mickey telling him to get up gives Rocky the strength to win the fight.

=== Rocky Balboa (2006) ===
In the sixth installment of the Rocky franchise, Rocky is seen paying tribute to Creed by telling customers at his restaurant stories about his friendship and fights with him. In a deleted scene, when Rocky wakes up, he sees Paulie sleeping and a photo of his first fight with Creed, but his face is censored and Rocky's face is covered by a scrap of paper with Paulie's head. During the commentary before the Rocky vs. Mason Dixon fight, a montage of Rocky's opponents that omits his two fights against Creed is shown.

=== Creed (2015) ===
In the seventh installment, it is revealed that Apollo Creed had an affair, and from that Adonis "Donnie" Johnson Creed (Michael B. Jordan) was born. In 1998, after Donnie's biological mother's death in the late 1990s, Apollo's widow, Mary Anne (Phylicia Rashad), adopts him. At a young age, not only does he possess the boxing skills of his father, but also his fiery temper. Seventeen years later, Donnie leaves his job to pursue a full-time career in boxing. He first seeks tutelage from Duke's son, "Lil' Duke" (Wood Harris), who runs the Delphi Boxing Academy. Duke refuses to work with Donnie to ensure his safety. Donnie, to his mother's dismay, moves to Philadelphia to seek out Rocky. While meeting up at Adrian's, Rocky is surprised when Donnie mentions a third fight between him and Apollo that happened behind closed doors (Rocky III) and presents himself as Apollo's son. Rocky compliments his father's boxing ability and reveals that Apollo won their third match.

When it is publicly revealed that Donnie is Apollo's illegitimate son, the media heavily publicizes the story of his infidelity, which catches the eye of the trainer for the reigning light-heavyweight champion, "Pretty" Ricky Conlan (Tony Bellew). Both parties want the fight to happen on the condition that Donnie assumes his legal surname instead of his birth mother's last name, Johnson, to which he agrees. Leading up to the fight, Rocky is diagnosed with cancer, which greatly impacts Donnie's behavior, including being incarcerated for the night after a brawl at a club. While Rocky visits him in jail, Donnie angrily blames him for his father's death, while Rocky tries to calm him down and understand Apollo, who isn't there to defend himself. After getting his mind straight, Donnie makes a pact with Rocky that they will both fight their respective battles together.

In Liverpool, Donnie receives a gift from Mary Anne – boxing trunks that strongly resemble his father's trunks, which he passed to Rocky, who then passed them to Tommy Gunn. The fight presents many parallels to Rocky and Apollo's original fight, with Donnie assuming his trainer's role. Conlan makes an unrelenting attack on Donnie and knocks him down. After a less-than-stellar introductory round, Donnie manages a right hook strong enough to cut Conlan by surprise. In the 11th round, after an intense flurry, Conlan manages a strong shot that seemingly knocks Donnie unconscious. While down, Donnie sees visions of his relationship with his girlfriend, Rocky's ailing composure, and finally, a scene of his father in his prime – motivating Donnie to return to his feet (and baffling Conlan and the audience).

Before the final round, Rocky is adamant on stopping the fight to save Donnie from the long-term effects of his injuries, a decision he contemplates 30 years after Apollo's death. However, Donnie wants to continue to fight to prove that he is not "a mistake." After the revelation, Rocky tells Donnie that, though he's never had the chance to thank Apollo for stepping in when Mickey died, it does not match what he's done for him and that he loves him. In the closing seconds of the fight, Donnie finally unleashes a style that is comparable to his father's and Rocky's, and manages to knock down Conlan for the first time in his career. A split decision determines Conlan the winner of the fight, and gives Donnie the ultimate respect, telling him that he's "the future of this division." During the post-fight interview, HBO Boxing analyst Max Kellerman asks Donnie what he would like to say to his father, to which Donnie tearfully says that he loves him and he knows he didn't leave him on purpose, in which he concludes the interview saying he's "proud to be a Creed."

=== Creed II (2018) ===
In the three years since the setting of the last film, Donnie has become the World Boxing Council's World Heavyweight Champion. Ivan Drago, who is destitute and divorced from his wife Ludmilla as a result of his loss to Rocky, has trained his son, Viktor, to be a boxer, hoping to restore his reputation vicariously through Viktor. Viktor rises in the ranks and eventually challenges Donnie to a match. The match is billed as "Creed vs. Drago II" and is held at MGM Grand, the same place where Ivan killed Apollo, with many in the film speculating it could end the same way. Ivan meets Rocky and taunts him by saying Viktor will break Donnie just like he broke Apollo. Rocky, who is still burdened by guilt over not stopping Apollo's match with Ivan, encourages Donnie to refuse the match. But Donnie insists on proving himself, so Rocky refuses to train him. During the weigh-in, Ivan mocks Donnie for being shorter than Apollo.

Viktor dominates Donnie in the match but gets disqualified for attacking Donnie while he is down. Donnie is hospitalized, with many noting he is lucky to have survived. When Donnie recovers, he and Rocky reconcile and Rocky agrees to train him for a rematch against Viktor, to be held in Russia. At the rematch, Donnie has Mary Anne, his wife Bianca, and Rocky in his corner. Thanks to his training, Donnie puts on a better performance. By the 10th round, Viktor is exhausted and unable to defend himself, so Ivan throws in the towel to save his son, resulting in Donnie's victory. Donnie and Bianca later take their infant daughter, Amara, to visit Apollo's grave. Donnie makes peace with the memory of his father and the burden of carrying on his legacy.

=== Creed III (2023) ===
After Donnie's childhood friend Damian "Dame" Anderson is released from prison, he asks Donnie, now a fight promoter, that if Apollo could give an underdog (Rocky) a title shot, why Donnie cannot do the same. Donnie mentions Rocky and Apollo's first match as an example of people loving underdog stories when trying to convince world champion Felix "El Guerrero" Chavez to take on a match against Dame.

After suffering a series of strokes, but before dying, Mary Anne talks with Donnie and then has an hallucination of talking to Apollo. She claims she was angry that he left her but tells Apollo that he brought her a son named Adonis, and this allowed her to forgive him. It is unclear if this is for his dying or his infidelity or both.

=== Video games ===
Rocky (2002): Developed by Rage Software, the game allows players to control Rocky Balboa through his boxing career, and features notable opponents from the film series, including Apollo Creed.

Rocky Legends (2004) is a sequel to the 2002 game which allows players to experience the careers of various characters from the Rocky universe, including Apollo.

Big Rumble Boxing: Creed Champions (2021) is an arcade-style boxing game that features a roster of characters from both the Rocky and Creed franchises, allowing players to fight as Apollo and others.

== Characterization ==
Film critic Anthony Digioia writes that the storyline of Rocky "gives enough time to Apollo Creed and his camp of men to express their lack of concern for Balboa as a challenge" and that the group sees Balboa "as a weak opponent". Richard Corliss of Time notes the original film's "boxing-movie clichés – the grizzled trainer (Burgess Meredith), the shy, sallow girlfriend (Talia Shire), the unbeatable champ Apollo Creed (Carl Weathers, briefly a linebacker for the Oakland Raiders)".

Andrew Bujalski of The New Yorker contrasts Creed with Clubber Lang: "Apollo Creed had been nearly as sympathetic and charismatic as our hero, but Lang is all comic-book villainy." Rita Kempley of The New York Times compares Creed's appearance to Sugar Ray Seales and observes that Creed and Rocky learn that "training together is the sweat bond of friendship."

The blog /Film credits the director's cut of the fourth film with better explaining why Creed "is so eager to step into the ring with Drago – a decision that will ultimately cost him his life." According to /Film, Creed starts the film having "seemingly everything he needs" but has an emptiness as he misses being World Heavyweight Champion and being relevant.

On The Atlantic, Adam Serwer views Creed as having "profoundly altered the character of Apollo Creed" and that Ryan Coogler's film accomplishes a redemption for Creed "in several ways: through cameos from sports reporters discussing Creed as one of the greatest boxers ever, through the casual manner in which Philly's denizens recognize and revere the name, and through Rocky, who acknowledges that Creed defeated him in their final, secret fight."

== Fighting style ==
In the film series, Apollo Creed is known as one of the world's best fighters, possessing a combination of speed and strength. His powerful jab and emphasis on agility complement his flashy personality and outfit. Creed focuses on a long-reaching jab to slowly wear his opponents down. He makes use of long punches instead of strong uppercuts or hooks, and is constantly moving, trying to take as little damage as possible while confusing his opponent. In terms of weaknesses, his only major drawback appears to be his deep sense of pride and strong self-confidence, which allows Rocky to get an edge over him in the ring by surprising Creed in their first encounter.

Creed's personality and fighting style have been compared to those of real-life boxer Muhammad Ali. The original film's release in 1976 also happened while Ali was reigning champion.

== Reception ==
In 2013, Bleacher Report ranked Creed the 3rd-best fictional boxer, only behind Rocky and Little Mac. In 2022, Screen Rant listed Creed as the second greatest villain in the Rocky and Creed films, only behind Ivan Drago. W. Kamau Bell praised Creed as "the rare Black character in the movie who was clearly way smarter than the white character in the movie" that 1970s films did not often have.

Stephen Carty cited Creed training Rocky in the third film as "a nice twist" and added that "more Weathers screen-time is always good". Marcus Irving writes that a positive of Mickey's death in the third film was "that Apollo Creed becomes a much larger part of the film, becoming Rocky's new trainer" and observed the interactions "between Stallone and Weathers in Creed's old training grounds are the closest that the film comes to feeling emotionally resonant." Reviewing Rocky IV, Sean Price hailed Weathers' performance as the "best and most surprising revelation to come out of this new version" and called him "the only actor here that shows any depth in their performance," comparing his performance to that of Mickey Rourke in The Wrestler.
