= List of Rocky characters =

This is a list of characters from the Rocky film series, consisting of Rocky (1976), Rocky II (1979), Rocky III (1982), Rocky IV (1985), Rocky V (1990), Rocky Balboa (2006), Creed (2015), Creed II (2018) and Creed III (2023).

== Principal characters ==
=== Rocky Balboa ===
Robert "Rocky" Balboa (also known by his ring name The Italian Stallion, played by Sylvester Stallone), is the titular character and main protagonist of the Rocky film series. The character was created by Sylvester Stallone, who has also portrayed him in all eight films in the franchise. He is depicted as an everyman who started out by going the distance and overcoming obstacles that had occurred in his life and career as a professional boxer. In the Creed films, he trains Apollo Creed's illegitimate son Adonis to win the world heavyweight championship.

=== Adonis Creed ===
Adonis "Donnie" Johnson Creed, "Hollywood Donnie" (born Adonis Johnson, played by Michael B. Jordan), is the protagonist and titular character from the Rocky film series sequel, Creed. He is the son of world champion Apollo Creed, from an affair shortly before he died. Adonis is trained by Apollo's friend and former rival, fellow world champion Rocky Balboa. He went on to become a second generation world champion.

== Main characters ==
=== Adrianna Pennino ===
Adrianna "Adrian" Balboa (née Pennino, played by Talia Shire) is Rocky's girlfriend, and later wife. She is the mother of their only child Robert Balboa Jr. She appears in the original five Rocky movies. In Rocky Balboa, it is revealed that Adrian died of ovarian cancer in 2002, after 26 years of marriage, and four years before the events of that film. Much of the film's premise is Rocky's grieving over losing Adrian.

=== Paulie Pennino ===
Paulie Pennino
- Rocky character
- First appearance: Rocky (1976)
- Last appearance: Rocky Balboa (2006)
- Created by: Sylvester Stallone
- Portrayed by: Burt Young

In-universe information
- Full name: Paul Pennino
- Nickname: Paulie
- Gender: Male
- Occupation: Meat packer Cornerman for Robert "Rocky" Balboa Sr.
- Relatives: Adrianna "Adrian" Balboa (sister); Robert "Rocky" Balboa Sr. (brother-in-law); Robert "Rocky" Balboa Jr. (nephew); Logan Balboa (grandnephew); Sico (robot)
- Nationality: American
- Status: Deceased

Paul "Paulie" Pennino is Adrian's older brother and Rocky's best friend, later becoming his brother-in-law when Rocky marries Adrian. He is one of only four characters to appear in the first six films (along with Rocky, Tony "Duke" Evers, and Stu Nahan). Young was nominated for the Academy Award for Best Supporting Actor for his performance in the first film, along with co-star Burgess Meredith.

He works at a meat-rendering facility and is portrayed as having a drinking problem and tending towards self-pity, immaturity and emotional outbursts. Though he cares for his friends and family, he is often jealous of their happiness and success and feels they owe him. Paulie is seen to be racist; in Rocky III he openly stated that he did not like any of the black boxers in the gym where Apollo Creed once trained. He also says in Rocky Balboa that "Italian food cooked up by a bunch of Mexicans ain't so special."

Paulie introduced his sister, Adrian, to Rocky and encouraged their relationship. Paulie also invited Rocky to begin his unique training method of punching sides of beef at the rendering facility. After Rocky marries Adrian and struggles to make a life outside of boxing, he recommends Rocky for his former meat packing job; he also buys Rocky's car from him after the latter is laid off. He is disappointed later when he sees Rocky training amateurs in Mighty Mick's Gym; Paulie visits the pet shop where Adrian works and yells at her for refusing to let Rocky continue his boxing career; the stress of the argument causes her to go into premature labor, giving birth to Robert, Paulie's nephew. He later keeps Adrian company on the night of Rocky's rematch with Creed, where Rocky wins the world heavyweight championship.

Rocky, now heavyweight champion, wins a number of succeeding matches and becomes increasingly wealthy and famous. Paulie becomes jealous of Rocky's success, and is arrested after drunkenly destroying a pinball machine with Rocky's image. Rocky bails him out, but Paulie is still angry, claiming Rocky owes him. Paulie briefly attempts to fight Rocky, who easily evades him, and finally asks him for a job. Rocky agrees and hires him as a cornerman. After Rocky's loss to Clubber Lang and the death of Rocky's manager Mickey, Paulie accompanies Rocky and Adrian to Los Angeles, but complains about the flophouse they are staying in, which annoys Apollo. Paulie is again in Rocky's corner as Rocky wins the championship back from Lang.

After Apollo Creed is killed in the ring during an exhibition bout with Soviet boxer Ivan Drago, Paulie accompanies Rocky and Tony "Duke" Evers, Apollo's former trainer, to Siberia to help Rocky train for his match against Ivan Drago. As before in Los Angeles, Paulie gripes about the weather and the austere conditions of the cabin in which they will be staying. Prior to Rocky's match against Drago, Paulie tells Rocky of the admiration and love he has for him. Rocky defeats Drago to avenge Apollo's death.

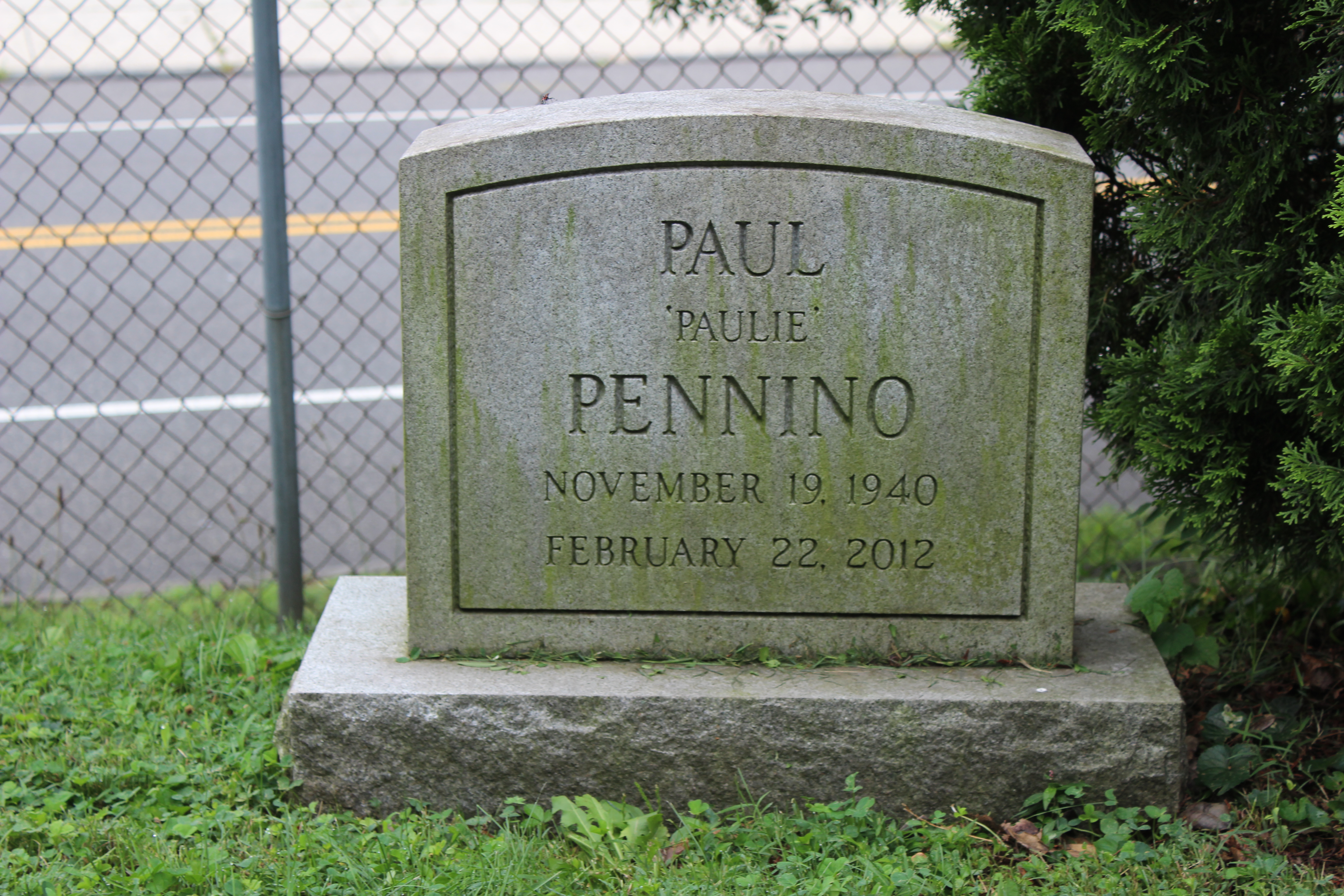
A headstone for Paulie Pennino was built for the filming of Creed in Laurel Hill Cemetery

Returning home to the U.S., Paulie and Adrian have a furious argument in Rocky's mansion: Paulie had unwittingly signed a power of attorney over to Rocky's accountant, who had squandered all of Rocky's money on poor real estate deals and also failed to pay Rocky's taxes over the past six years. Their mansion has been mortgaged for $400,000, and with Rocky forced into retirement due to brain damage, they must sell the mansion and most of their belongings. They move back to their old residence in the Kensington section of Philadelphia. When Rocky stops paying attention to Robert and shifts his focus to training a young boxer from Oklahoma named Tommy Gunn, Paulie steps in and begins training and spending more time with his nephew. Later, after Gunn leaves Rocky, he shows up at a bar to challenge Rocky to a fight. Paulie berates Tommy for his selfishness, and Tommy punches Paulie, leading Rocky to taking on, and beating Gunn, in a street fight.

Sixteen years later, Paulie is shown having resumed his meat-packing job. When Rocky agrees to an exhibition match against heavyweight champion Mason "The Line" Dixon, Paulie again becomes his cornerman. Initially sceptical of Rocky's desire to return to fighting, Paulie becomes fully supportive when he is laid off from the factory. He is also shown helping Rocky train and operate his restaurant, Adrian's (named after Adrian, who died four years prior to the events of the film). Paulie, along with Robert, celebrate with Rocky after he goes the distance with Dixon.

Paulie is shown as having died on February 22, 2012. He was buried next to Adrian. Rocky visits his grave on his birthday and leaves a bottle of his favourite liquor on his headstone after which he sits and reads the newspaper. When Adonis Creed moves in with Rocky, he stays in Paulie's old bedroom.

=== Apollo Creed ===
Apollo Creed (played by Carl Weathers) is a heavyweight boxing champion who is a rival and later friend of Rocky Balboa. He appears in the first four Rocky movies. After a bout against Soviet boxer Ivan Drago, Apollo dies from severe head trauma sustained during his match. His son Adonis is trained by Rocky in the first two Creed films.

=== Mickey Goldmill ===
Mickey Goldmill (played by Burgess Meredith), is Rocky's trainer who used to be a professional boxer (specifically the Bantamweight division) when he was younger. He mainly appears in the first three movies. He also appears in the fifth film. He dies from a heart attack halfway through the third film shortly before Rocky's bout with Clubber Lang.

=== Tony "Duke" Evers ===
Tony "Duke" Evers
- Rocky character
- First appearance: Rocky (1976)
- Last appearance: Rocky Balboa (2006)
- Created by: Sylvester Stallone
- Portrayed by: Tony Burton

In-universe information
- Alias: Duke
- Gender: Male
- Occupation: Professional boxing trainer (formerly professional boxer)
- Family: Tony "Little Duke" Evers Jr. (son), Apollo Creed (adoptive son), Adonis Creed (adoptive grandson)
- Nationality: American

Tony "Duke" Evers was the manager/trainer of Apollo Creed until Creed's death during his bout with Ivan Drago, before becoming the trainer of Rocky Balboa. He was portrayed by Tony Burton and is one of only four characters (along with Rocky, Paulie Pennino, and Stu Nahan) to have featured in all six original Rocky films.

Tony is introduced in Rocky as the trainer of World Heavyweight Champion Apollo Creed, preparing for his planned Bicentennial fight against number one contender Mac Lee Green. However, Green breaks his left hand in training, and with none of the other top contenders available, Creed devises a novelty promotion to offer a local fighter a shot at the title on New Year's Day in Philadelphia, Pennsylvania. Creed selects Rocky Balboa, an unknown club fighter, based on his nickname "The Italian Stallion".

While Creed dismisses Rocky as a serious threat, Tony became concerned whilst observing a news report of Rocky's meat freezer training session at his friend Paulie's meat factory. Creed is knocked down by Balboa in the first round, the first time ever in his career, and Tony urges Creed to concentrate on finishing the fight quickly, but Creed is dragged into a prolonged bloody battle with the determined Rocky. Prior to the final round, Tony urges Creed to let him stop the fight after it is revealed that he is bleeding internally as a result of Balboa's heavy body shots. Creed wins the fight on a split-decision points victory.

In Rocky II, a humiliated Creed pushes for a rematch with Rocky. However, Tony pleads with Apollo to forget Balboa and find a new challenger. Creed however, is determined to beat Balboa decisively, and goads Rocky into accepting a rematch. More focused, Apollo trains hard under Tony's tutelage, and dominates the majority of the fight, although Tony remains wary of Rocky's punching power and determination. Tony pleads with Creed to fight defensively in the final round to win the bout on points and avoid a potential knockout defeat. Nevertheless, Apollo ignores Tony's advice and is subsequently KO'd by Balboa, losing the championship in the process.

Creed retires soon afterwards, and Tony returns to Los Angeles, where he continues training local fighters at the "TOUGH GYM". However, when Creed takes over as Rocky's trainer following the death of Rocky's manager Mickey Goldmill after Rocky's title defeat to James "Clubber" Lang, Creed brings Rocky to Los Angeles to formally meet Tony, who appears ecstatic at the idea of finally working alongside Rocky after the two brutal contests he had with Creed. After a shaky start, Creed and Tony completely revamp Balboa's fighting style and, along with Rocky's wife Adrian, also help rebuild Rocky's self-esteem, which is left shattered after his knockout by Lang and the loss of Mickey. A rejuvenated Rocky reclaims the title with a third-round KO of Lang.

In Rocky IV, a now 42-year-old Apollo comes out of retirement for an exhibition bout against Soviet Union boxer Ivan Drago in Las Vegas, with Tony and Rocky in his corner. However, Creed is killed in the second round by Drago, consequently setting up a grudge match between Balboa and Drago in Moscow on Christmas Day 1985. Now Rocky's main trainer, Tony travels with Rocky, Paulie and Adrian to Russia and assists Rocky in his training, providing him with encouragement while also telling him that he now stands as the carrier of Apollo's legacy. Tony confides to Rocky that Creed was like his own son, and part of him has died along with Apollo. Rocky ultimately knocks out Drago in the fifteenth round to claim victory and avenge Apollo's death.

Tony makes a brief appearance at the beginning of Rocky V, which begins immediately following Rocky's victory over Drago. As Tony lauds Rocky for his courage, Rocky begins to suffer physical trauma, and Tony hurries to find Adrian. After returning to the U.S., Rocky announces his retirement due to brain damage, as well as suffering bankruptcy. Rocky becomes a trainer to the new World Heavyweight Champion Tommy Gunn but Tony does not reappear as Rocky repels the challenge of a jealous Gunn in a street fight.

Tony returns in Rocky Balboa, where Rocky has been long retired, now running a restaurant in Philadelphia following Adrian's death several years earlier. Tony returns as Rocky's trainer after Balboa agrees to an exhibition bout against the current World Heavyweight Champion Mason Dixon. Citing that the nearly 60-year-old Balboa lacks speed, or durability to endure typical training, Tony decides to focus on Rocky's lone remaining asset - his incredible punching power - and develops a regimen focused on strength training and building "hurtin' bombs". Tony subsequently participates in the fight's press conference, and states that Rocky maintains a "puncher's chance". Rocky eventually battles Dixon through all ten rounds, though he loses by split decision (reminiscent of the first bout with Creed). Rocky is unconcerned with the outcome and celebrates his moral victory with Tony, Paulie, and his son Robert before leaving the ring.

Though Tony is not present in Creed, his presence remains as his son Tony Jr., known as "Little Duke", runs the Delphi Boxing Academy in Los Angeles. When Apollo's illegitimate son Adonis Creed asks for his assistance in training, Tony Jr. turns him down, warning him about the death of his father at the hands of Ivan Drago. Adonis challenges anyone in the gym that if they could land a punch on him, they win his car. Tony Jr.'s own student, Danny "Stuntman" Wheeler (played by actual light-heavyweight boxer Andre Ward) lays Creed out on the canvas and wins his car. Tony Jr. and Wheeler are both later seen training for a match with "Pretty" Ricky Conlan, and at the weigh-in in where Wheeler is assaulted by Conlan, breaking his jaw.

In Creed II Tony Jr. and Rocky become part of Adonis's training team as he fights Ivan Drago's son Viktor.

=== Clubber Lang ===
James "Clubber" Lang (portrayed by Mr. T) is the main antagonist in Rocky III. Lang is a professional boxer fighting out of Chicago, Illinois. He primarily trains alone and is both enormously strong and powerful, but also extremely arrogant. He easily defeats all his opponents, rising through the ranks to become the number one contender to Balboa's title.

Lang publicly challenges Rocky at a public event, where he accuses Rocky of ducking him, and also makes a lewd suggestion to Adrian. This causes an infuriated Rocky to accept Lang's challenge, even though he had earlier decided to retire. Lang feverishly trains by himself in a basement with minimal equipment, whereas Rocky trains in an open session at a glitzy hotel lobby filled with distractions, not taking his training as seriously as Clubber.

Before the match, Lang is involved in a scuffle with Rocky, which causes Rocky's trainer Mickey to suffer a fatal cardiac arrest. Lang brutally knocks out the distracted and ill-prepared Rocky in the second round, to become world heavyweight champion.

Lang though, loses the title back to Rocky in his next match after Apollo Creed and Tony "Duke" Evers re-train Rocky and help him regain his confidence. Used to winning his fights early with swift knockouts, Lang is taunted by Rocky, and, exhausted from expending his energy trying to knock Rocky out again, is knocked out himself by Balboa in the third round.

=== Ludmilla Vobet Drago ===
Ludmilla Vobet Drago
- Rocky character
- First appearance: Rocky IV (1985)
- Last appearance: Creed II (2018)
- Created by: Sylvester Stallone
- Portrayed by: Brigitte Nielsen

In-universe information
- Occupation: Professional boxing manager
- Spouse: Ivan Drago (divorced)
- Children: Viktor Drago
- Nationality: Soviet Union (formerly); Russia

Ludmilla Vobet-Drago (Russian: Людмила Вобет Драго), is a former Olympic swimmer for the Soviet Union (present-day Russia) and Ivan Drago's wife in Rocky IV. Along with manager Nicolai Koloff, she acts as Ivan's spokesperson, describing the power of his punches and firmly believes her husband is impossible to defeat in a boxing match. Ivan is a man of few words, with Ludmilla usually speaking for him during interviews.

In Creed II, it is revealed that after Ivan's loss to Rocky, Ivan was disgraced by the USSR, where he was shamed and kicked out of the country, tainting the Drago name forever. In 1990, Ludmilla gave birth to Viktor but soon after divorced Ivan and left him to raise their son on his own in Ukraine. She is part of the Russian group that supports her estranged son Viktor in his rematch against Adonis Creed, despite Viktor's animosity towards her for betraying him and his father. During the match, Ludmilla leaves the arena in disgust when Viktor is knocked down again by Donnie. Viktor ends up losing the bout without the presence of the Russian spectators and his mother.

In real-life, Brigitte Nielsen was engaged to Sylvester Stallone (who plays Rocky), during production of Rocky IV, and married shortly after the release, before they divorced in 1987.

=== Ivan Drago ===
Ivan Drago (Russian: Иван Драго, played by Dolph Lundgren) is a boxer and former Infantry Captain from the Soviet Union (present-day Russia). He first appeared in the 1985 film Rocky IV, in which he is Rocky Balboa's rival and the main antagonist. He was trained in Soviet labs and given doses of PEDs. In Las Vegas, he easily defeated Apollo Creed in the second round, resulting in Apollo dying from severe brain trauma. His next bout was against Rocky in Moscow, where Rocky viciously knocked him out in the final round.

In Creed II, it is revealed that after Ivan's loss to Rocky, Ivan was disgraced by the USSR, where he was shamed and kicked out of the country, tainting the Drago name forever. In 1990, Ludmilla gave birth to Viktor but soon after divorced him and left him to raise their son on his own in Ukraine. Since then, he trained his son in boxing, during which Viktor defeated Creed for the title. In the rematch, as Creed was prepared to obliterate Viktor in the ring, Ivan threw in the towel to spare his son such a loss, giving Creed the victory.

=== Rocky Balboa Jr. ===
Rocky Balboa Jr.
- Rocky character
- First appearance: Rocky II (1979)
- Created by: Sylvester Stallone
- Portrayed by: Seargeoh Stallone (Rocky II); Ina Fried (Rocky III); Rocky Krakoff (Rocky IV); Sage Stallone (Rocky V); Milo Ventimiglia (Rocky Balboa, Creed II)

In-universe information
- Full name: Robert Balboa Jr.
- Alias: Rocky Jr.
- Occupation: Accountant
- Children: Logan Balboa
- Relatives: Paulie Pennino (uncle); Adonis Creed (surrogate cousin)
- Nationality: American

Robert "Bobby" Balboa Jr. is the only son of Rocky and Adrian. In Rocky II, he is born one month prematurely after Adrian experiences sudden labour while arguing with Paulie.

In Rocky V Robert meets his father at the airport following his victory over Ivan Drago, proudly telling him he made the honour roll at school. However, after Rocky's fortune is squandered by his accountant, Robert is forced to leave his comfortable life behind as the Balboas are forced to relocate to their old neighbourhood in Philadelphia. Robert is bullied at his new school, and trains with his uncle, Paulie, before taking retaliation and knocking his bully out in front of his classmates. Robert's relationship with Rocky becomes strained after Rocky begins training an up and coming fighter, Tommy Gunn, causing him to be neglected by his father. After Gunn leaves Rocky to sign with promoter George "Washington" Duke, Rocky and Robert make amends. When Gunn challenges Rocky to a street fight, Robert cheers him on alongside his uncle and mother Adrian, as Rocky defeats Gunn.

In Rocky Balboa Robert is again estranged from his father following the death of his mother Adrian, and is how working as a corporate employee in Philadelphia, although he also has a poor relationship with his boss and co-workers. When Rocky comes out of retirement to fight current World Heavyweight Champion Mason "The Line" Dixon, Robert tries to discourage him, blaming his father for his own failures. Rocky delivers a passionate riposte to his son, telling him that; "Life is about how hard you can get hit, and keep moving forward." Robert later quits his job to be at his father's side during his training, and celebrates with Rocky and his uncle Paulie after Rocky goes the distance with Dixon.

Robert later moves to Vancouver with his girlfriend, with whom he has a son, Logan. When Robert is visited by Rocky after training Adonis Creed to victory over Viktor Drago, he introduces Logan to his grandfather, and they reconcile once more.

Robert Balboa Jr. is portrayed by Seargeoh Stallone in Rocky II, Ina Fried in Rocky III, Rocky Krakoff in Rocky IV, Sage Stallone in Rocky V, and Milo Ventimiglia as an adult Bobby in Rocky Balboa and Creed II. A photo of a nine-year-old Sage Stallone as Bobby, with Rocky, is seen in Creed.

=== Tommy Gunn ===
Tommy Gunn
- Rocky character
- First appearance: Rocky V (1990)
- Last appearance: Rocky V (1990)
- Created by: Sylvester Stallone
- Portrayed by: Tommy Morrison

In-universe information
- Nicknames: The Machine; Rocky's Robot
- Occupation: Professional boxer

Tommy "The Machine" Gunn is a supporting character and the antagonist in Rocky V. Originally from Oklahoma, Gunn travels to South Philadelphia to seek training from former world heavyweight champion Rocky. Despite having a very short temper, he is accepted by Rocky as a protege. Gunn progressively advances up the ranks in the boxing world, at the cost of Rocky's relationship with his son Robert. Gunn also becomes frustrated at being compared to Rocky, as well as having to wait for a shot at the title.

Because he has no formal contract with Rocky, Gunn is easily lured in by promoter George Washington Duke's promises of fame and money. He eventually defeats Union Cane in a first round knockout, winning the World Heavyweight Championship, but is not accepted by the fans or the press, who do not consider him as a true champion without having faced a worthy challenger. He also loses respect from the boxing crowd when, after his title win, he publicly thanks Duke and not Rocky for his success and stardom.

Duke convinces Gunn to challenge Rocky to a match, but after Tommy assaults Paulie, Rocky invites Gunn to a street fight instead, against Duke's recommendation. Gunn is defeated by Rocky, escorted away by two police officers and arrested.

=== Mason "The Line" Dixon ===
Mason Dixon
- Rocky character
- First appearance: Rocky Balboa (2006)
- Last appearance: Rocky Balboa (2006)
- Created by: Sylvester Stallone
- Portrayed by: Antonio Tarver

In-universe information
- Nickname: The Line
- Gender: Male
- Occupation: Professional boxer

Mason "The Line" Dixon is the undisputed World Heavyweight Champion in Rocky Balboa. His reign is unpopular due to a lack of formidable competition, until ESPN airs a computer simulation of a dream match of him losing to Rocky; this brings enough attention for Dixon's promoters to stage a real version of the match in Las Vegas, with a portion of the proceeds going to charity. Despite predictions of Rocky being knocked out early, the match goes the entire distance of 10 rounds. During the second round, Dixon injures his left hand after punching Rocky in the hip; Rocky takes full advantage of this injury throughout the duration of the fight. Dixon eventually wins by a narrow split decision, thus he retains his undefeated streak.

=== Bianca Creed ===
Bianca Creed
- Rocky character
- First appearance: Creed (2015)
- Last appearance: Creed III (2023)
- Portrayed by: Tessa Thompson

In-universe information
- Occupation: Singer
- Significant other: Adonis Creed (husband)
- Children: Amara Creed (daughter)

Bianca Taylor Creed is a singer, music producer, and wife of Donnie Creed. She wears hearing aids due to progressive hearing loss. Bianca first meets Donnie when he confronts her over her loud music in her apartment on his first night in Philadelphia. A few nights later, after discovering Bianca performing a concert at a night club, Donnie asks her out and they develop a relationship. This relationship is strained when Donnie is jailed for punching a musician for calling him "Baby Creed", but they reconcile shortly after they discover that Rocky has been diagnosed with non-Hodgkin lymphoma.

In Creed II, Bianca's music career kicks off with a recording contract, but shortly after Donnie proposes to her, she discovers that she is pregnant. Bianca gives birth to a baby girl named Amara, but it is discovered that Amara is born deaf due to Bianca's progressive degenerative hearing disorder being hereditary.

=== Mary Anne Creed ===
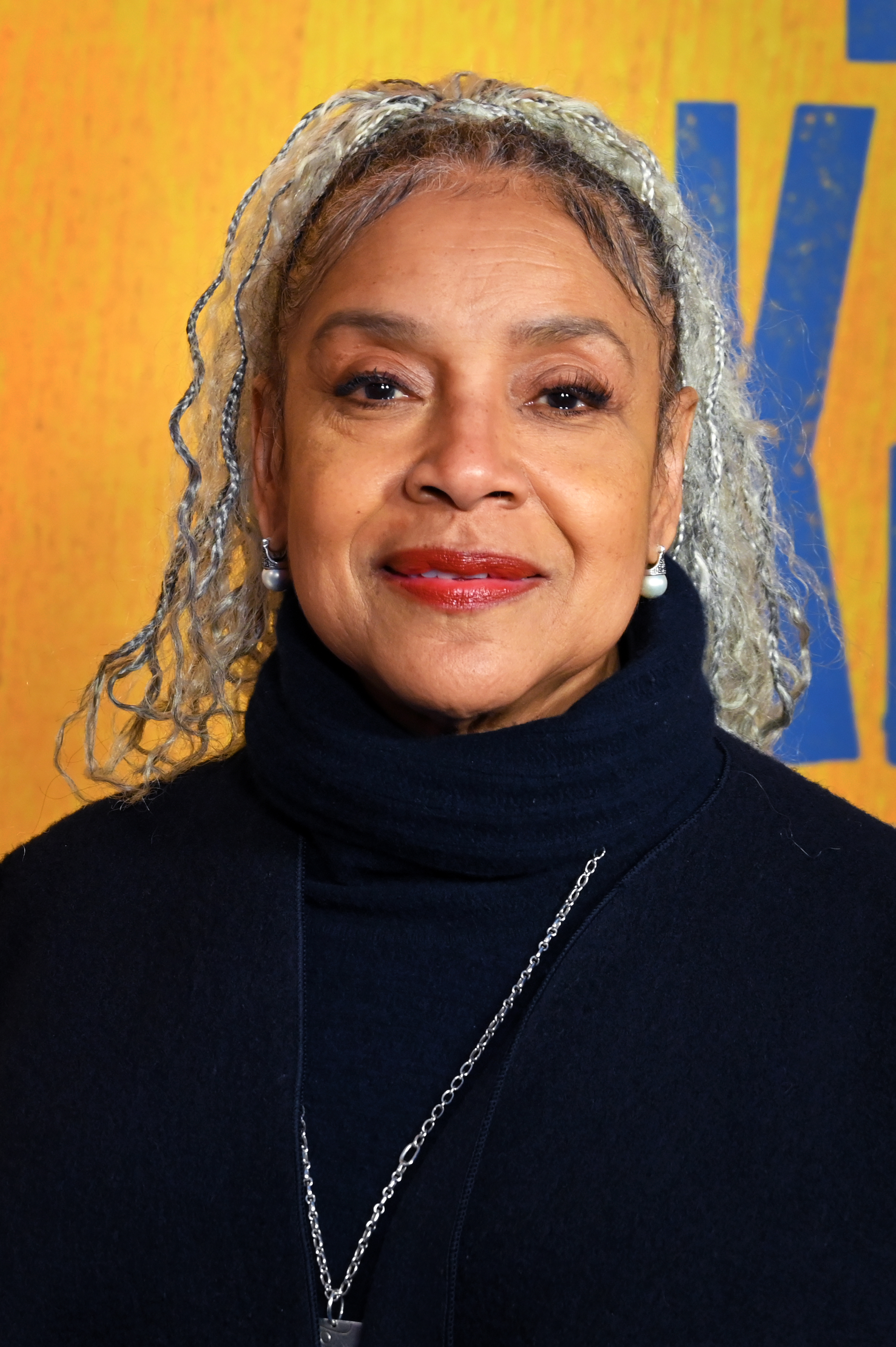
Phylicia Rashad portrayed Mary Anne Creed in Creed films.

Mary Anne Creed is the wife and later widow of Apollo Creed. In Creed, she adopts Adonis "Donnie" Johnson, who is Apollo's illegitimate son, in 1998. In 2015, she discovers that Donnie has quit a lucrative job at a securities firm to follow his father's footsteps as a boxer, much to her dismay. She eventually supports him by sending him a pair of "stars and stripes" boxing trunks for his match against "Pretty" Ricky Conlan. She watches her son's match on television, reacting with pride with his performance.

In Creed II, Mary Anne is happy that Donnie and Bianca would move close to her in Los Angeles, however she is dismayed when she learns it is so Donnie could take the challenge to fight Viktor Drago, the son of Ivan Drago, who killed Apollo in the ring. She admonishes Donnie by telling him that his match is not to avenge his father but for personal pride and vengeance, and attempts to dissuade him from the fight due to having a family to lose. After Donnie is heavily injured in the fight, Mary Anne contacts Rocky to encourage him to reconcile with Donnie and train with him for the rematch. Mary Anne joins the rematch in person in Moscow and celebrates when Donnie wins.

In Creed III, Mary Anne is happy to be close with her family, especially bonding with her granddaughter Amara, but her health has significantly decreased. Following a stroke, Donnie and Bianca are careful in keeping her healthy. She becomes disturbed when she hears that Donnie has reconnected with Dame, Donnie's former best friend who he sneaks out with from her home to hang out with. She later opens a box filled with letters sent from Dame in prison to Donnie, which she refused to share with her son due to her believing he was a bad influence on him. She calls Donnie and reveals this to him, which shocks Donnie, who calls her out for keeping this from him which led to Dame manipulating Donnie's downfall all these years later. Mary Anne later suffers from another fatal stroke and Donnie joins her at her deathbed, where in her delirium she talks with Apollo and thanks him for giving her Donnie before she passes away.

Mary Anne Creed is portrayed by Lavelle Roby in Rocky, Sylvia Meals in Rocky II and Rocky IV, and Phylicia Rashad in Creed, Creed II and Creed III.

=== "Pretty" Ricky Conlan ===
Ricky Conlan
- Rocky character
- First appearance: Creed (2015)
- Last appearance: Creed III (2023)
- Portrayed by: Tony Bellew

In-universe information
- Nickname: Pretty Ricky
- Gender: Male
- Occupation: Professional boxer
- Children: 2

"Pretty" Ricky Conlan is the Lineal World Light Heavyweight Champion, #1 Pound for Pound Boxer in the world in Creed. The Liverpudlian boxer faces a seven-year prison sentence for illegal firearms possession. He is initially slated to defend his title against Danny "Stuntman" Wheeler, but the fight is cancelled when Conlan breaks Wheeler's jaw during a press conference. His manager Tommy Holiday convinces him to fight Donnie Creed as a last hurrah before serving his prison sentence.

Conlan is shown to not have much respect for the legendary fighters of the past claiming, "No cares about Balboa anymore" and taunting Donnie for being a "false Creed" believing that Donnie only earned his shot through his name alone with "not a real fight in [Donnie's] life". Conlan has a "rags to riches" background as his father worked on the docks. Conlan predicts an early end, but Donnie goes the distance. Despite being knocked down for the first time in his career by the end of the 12th round, Conlan narrowly wins by a split decision. He shows respect for Donnie, telling him he is the future of the sport and imploring that Donnie wears the "Creed" name with pride.

Conlan returns in Creed III, where he has a long-awaited rematch following his release from prison. Donnie finally beats Conlan by knockout, and Donnie later retires from boxing.

Conlan is portrayed by real life boxer and former World Cruiserweight champion Tony Bellew.

=== Tony "Little Duke" Evers Jr. ===
Tony "Little Duke" Evers Jr. is the son of Tony "Duke" Evers, the former trainer of Apollo Creed and Rocky. Due to Apollo and Tony's father-son relationship, "Little Duke" is something of an uncle-figure to Donnie. In Creed, Little Duke urges Donnie Creed not to pursue a boxing career. In Creed II, Donnie has Little Duke train him for his match with Viktor Drago after Rocky refuses to train him, but eventually assists Rocky in training Donnie in his rematch to Viktor Drago. He also returns in Creed III, helping train Donnie to fight his childhood friend who challenged Donnie after his release from prison.

Tony "Little Duke" Evers Jr. is portrayed by Wood Harris.

=== Viktor Drago ===
Viktor Drago
- Rocky character
- First appearance: Creed: Rise to Glory (2018)
- Portrayed by: Florian "Big Nasty" Munteanu

In-universe information
- Gender: Male
- Occupation: Professional boxer

Viktor Ivanovich Drago (Russian: Виктор Иванович Драго) is the son of Ivan Drago and a second-generation boxer. Following his defeat at the hands of Rocky Balboa in 1985, Ivan lost his prestige as a Soviet boxer and his wife Ludmilla abandoned him and Viktor. Since then, Ivan has trained Viktor to be the best boxer in Ukraine. Boxing promoter Buddy Marcelle has Viktor challenge Donnie Creed for the WBC title at Barclays Center in Brooklyn. Despite objections by Rocky, Donnie accepts the challenge, but Rocky decides not to be in his corner. Viktor overwhelms Donnie with his brute strength and long reach throughout the match. In the third round, Viktor breaks Donnie's left ribs and knocks him down, but is disqualified when he punches Donnie while the referee is still counting.

In the months that follow, Viktor later enjoys popularity in Russia where he wins several top-billed fights, but faces heavy pressure behind-the-scenes from his father and his newfound attention, especially from media and Russian delegates. During a state dinner attended by his mother, Viktor is enraged at seeing her, later walking out and chastising his father for seeking approval from those who previously disowned them.

Viktor later demands a rematch against Donnie; this time in Moscow. Donnie accepts the challenge once more, but now with Rocky and Little Duke in his corner. Donnie surprises Viktor with his lightning-fast reflexes and high stamina throughout the match. Viktor knocks down Donnie several times, but Donnie displays his resilience by getting up and exploiting Viktor's tendency to overextend his punches; at the same time, he progressively wears out Viktor by going beyond the fourth round, as Viktor has been accustomed to only quick knockouts. By the tenth round, Viktor is knocked down for the first time in his professional career. He is further demoralized when Ludmilla walks out of the match after being knocked down for a second time. Seeing his son receive more strikes from Donnie without any counterattacks, Ivan throws in the towel and concedes the match to Donnie. Viktor and Ivan return to their simple life in Ukraine, having grown in understanding with one another.

Viktor returns in Creed III (2023), having become an experienced fighter and a friend of Donnie. Donnie organizes a match between his prótégé, Felix "El Guerrero" Chavez, and Viktor, however Viktor is assaulted and injured by several men during Bianca's label party. Donnie later realizes the men were former inmates sent by Damian "Diamond Dame" Anderson to orchestrate Dame's winning match against Chavez. Upon his recovery, Viktor helps Adonis train for his upcoming fight against Dame.

Viktor Drago is portrayed by German-Romanian actor, model, and real-life professional boxer Florian "Big Nasty" Munteanu.

=== "Diamond Dame" Damian Anderson ===
"Diamond Dame" Damian Anderson
- Rocky character
- First appearance: Creed III (2023)
- Portrayed by: Jonathan Majors

In-universe information
- Gender: Male
- Occupation: Professional boxer

"Diamond" Damian Anderson is the best friend of Adonis Creed. He is the former Golden Gloves champion and also the former heavyweight champion of the world. He grew up with Adonis in a group home, in which they were abused by Leon, the caretaker. In 2002, Dame and Adonis sneak out to a boxing match, a match in which Dame wins by knockout. Shortly after the match, Dame speaks to Adonis of his ambitions to go pro. During a detour at a liquor store, Adonis runs into Leon and beats him up for the abuse he caused to both Dame and him. He starts to get jumped by Leon’s friends, which caused Dame to aid Adonis by pulling a gun out. Police arrived on the scene, causing Dame to get arrested while Adonis escaped. During his time in prison, Dame wrote letters to Adonis, but Adonis never got the letters, as his adoptive mother Mary-Anne hid them away from him. As he watched Adonis living his life as a boxer, Dame felt resentment and abandonment.

After being released from prison, Dame goes to see Adonis. As they were catching up, Dame tells Adonis of his plans to box again, a chance he never got to show the world in a complete manner due to almost a decade being spent behind bars. Adonis tells him to come by the gym, causing scorn from Duke and Adonis’ protege and heavyweight champion, Felix Chavez, due to his dirty style of fighting.

Due to his frustrations of not getting a title shot, Dame comes up with a plan in order to get what he desires. During an album party hosted by Bianca, Dame reveals how he got locked up, but decides to leave out the rest in order for Adonis to tell her. It was during that time that an assailant crashed the party and attacked Viktor Drago, Felix Chavez’s next opponent for his upcoming fight. Due to Drago being out for months due to the injuries he sustained to his right arm and not being able to find another professional fighter for Chavez, Creed proposes that Chavez fights Dame instead. While Duke disagrees with Adonis, Chavez and his mother agree to fight Dame.

On fight night, the rounds start off tough as Chavez puts the pressure on Dame. However, Dame uses dirty tactics and knocks out Chavez in the third round, becoming the new unified heavyweight champion of the world. Adonis later confronts Dame for orchestrating the attack on Drago. Dame tells him off and told to think about what it’s like watching someone else living a life that was meant for him. After giving him a black eye, Dame says he’s coming for it all.

Watching Adonis on First Take, Dame calls him during the broadcast and taunts him. Adonis then challenges Dame for the heavyweight champion of the world, in which Dame agrees to fight. After heavy training, Dame and Adonis fight in "The Battle of Los Angeles" at Dodger Stadium. After a back and forth grueling match, Dame and Adonis experience flashbacks from their childhood, ranging from the group home they stayed at to Dame’s time in prison. In the twelfth and final round, Dame manages to score a knockdown on Adonis. Adonis, no longer feeling the guilt he held on for so long, knocks Dame out in the closing few seconds of the fight, becoming champ once again and giving Dame his first loss ever.

After the fight, Adonis visits Dame in the locker room and apologizes to him for not checking up on him for 18 years. Dame and Adonis reconcile, with both men admitting that it wasn’t each other’s fault.

Damian Anderson is portrayed by Jonathan Majors.

== Additional characters ==
=== Tony Gazzo ===
Anthony "Tony" Gazzo (played by Joe Spinell) is a loan shark in Philadelphia who initially hires Rocky as an enforcer and collector to rough up people who owe him money. Even though Gazzo gets irritated whenever Rocky does not directly obey his orders, by refusing to beat people who are unable to pay him, he still has respect and patience for Rocky, even giving him money for a date with Adrian and later for his training for Rocky's first fight with Apollo. In the second film, Gazzo attends Rocky and Adrian's wedding. He unsuccessfully tries to persuade Rocky to come back to work for him multiple times. Gazzo is last seen in attendance to support Rocky in his rematch with Apollo.

=== George "Miles" Jergens ===
George "Miles" Jergens (played by Thayer David) is a successful boxing promoter who oversees Apollo Creed's fights. After Apollo proposes to fight a local contender for his United States Bicentennial match, Jergens invites Rocky to his office to secure a deal for the main event. He only appears in the first movie.

=== Spider Rico ===
Spider Rico is a Puerto Rican boxer who is Rocky's first opponent in Rocky. Both men fight in the match that is heavily booed by the spectators due to the lack of action with frequent clinches. Rico headbutts Rocky, who responds by knocking Rico out with a flurry of punches and a ground-and-pound. In the locker room, Spider comments that Rocky "really got lucky." He reappears in Rocky Balboa, by this time, he has become a priest. He and Rocky are friends, and Rocky lets him eat for free in his restaurant. In addition, Rocky also gives Spider a job in the kitchen, where he prepares food and washes dishes. Spider also acts as one of Rocky's cornermen in his fight with Mason Dixon. In a deleted scene in Creed II, it's revealed that he had died in 2018 at approximately 73 years of age as Rocky attends his funeral and reminisces about their fight together.

=== Nicolai Koloff ===
Nicolai Koloff (Russian: Николай Колофф) is Ivan Drago's manager and an official of the Soviet Politburo. He arrogantly believes Drago is impossible to defeat and uses his status to boost Soviet supremacy over America in boxing as a result of Drago's defeating Apollo Creed. During the fight between Rocky and Drago, Koloff is seated next to the Soviet premier when he soon notices Drago on the losing end of the fight and insults him, telling him he is disgracing the Soviet Union by letting an American fight admirably on Russian soil. In response, Drago grabs him by the throat, throws him off of the ring apron and proclaims he only fights for himself. He is last seen begrudgingly alongside the Soviet premier applauding Rocky's speech following his defeating of Ivan Drago.

It is implied that after the Soviet collapse he was disgraced by the Politburo as a result of his affiliation with Drago.

Nicolai Koloff was portrayed by American actor Michael Pataki.

=== George Washington Duke ===
George Washington Duke is the main antagonist in Rocky V. He is a crooked boxing promoter who first attempts to sign Rocky in a title defense against Union Cane just after the former's return from his fight with Ivan Drago in the Soviet Union. Rocky declines and announces his retirement. Upon discovery of Rocky's health and financial problems, Duke makes another attempt to lure him back into boxing, but is thwarted by Adrian. When he learns that Rocky has no formal management agreement with Tommy Gunn, he corrupts Gunn with a lucrative contract. In response to the crowd and media's negative reaction toward Gunn's reign as champion, Duke has him challenge Rocky to a match. Gunn chose to face Rocky on the streets, against Duke's wishes. After defeating Gunn in a street fight, Rocky gives Duke an uppercut, despite the latter threatening to sue him.

George Washington Duke is portrayed by Richard Gant.

=== “Little” Marie ===
”Little” Marie is first seen in Rocky as a 12-year-old girl hanging out with other delinquent teenagers in South Philadelphia. Rocky lectures her about her choice of friends, as he does not want to see her grow up to be a "whore". After Rocky walks her back to her home, Marie yells, "Screw you, creepo!" to him.

Marie was originally supposed to appear in Rocky V, where she ended up becoming a prostitute as Rocky had predicted. Though the scene was filmed with Jodi Letizia reprising her role, it was ultimately left on the cutting room floor.

Marie returns in Rocky Balboa as a bartender at the local tavern and a single mother, having recently broken up with a Jamaican man, the father of her son. Rocky hires her as a hostess at "Adrian's" and slowly develops a friendship with her. Marie and her son Stephenson are clearly present in the ringside aftermath of Rocky's fight with Mason "The Line" Dixon.

Marie is portrayed by Jodi Letizia in Rocky and Geraldine Hughes in Rocky Balboa.

=== Stephenson ===
Stephenson, nicknamed "Steps", is Marie's son in Rocky Balboa. Rocky acts as a father figure to Steps, bringing him to an animal shelter to find a dog for adoption. There, they pick up an old and ugly dog, which Steps nicknames "Punchy". Steps later is part of Rocky's corner in his fight against Mason "The Line" Dixon.

Stephenson is portrayed by James Francis Kelly III.

== Supporting characters ==
=== Father Carmine ===
Father Carmine is a priest and Rocky's spiritual advisor. He appears in Rocky II, where he conducts Rocky and Adrian's wedding and later on gives his blessings to Rocky before his rematch against Apollo Creed. He reappears in two scenes in Rocky V, when Rocky asks for his blessing upon Tommy Gunn's training, and also after Rocky defeats Tommy in a later street fight.

Father Carmine is portrayed by Paul J. Micale.

=== Thunderlips ===
Thunderlips, "The Ultimate Male" and "The Ultimate Object of Desire" is a near seven foot, 390 lb heel professional wrestling champion who fights Rocky in a fundraising champion boxer vs. champion wrestler match in Rocky III.

Thunderlips is portrayed by Hulk Hogan.

=== Amara Creed ===
Amara Creed is the daughter of Adonis Creed and Bianca Taylor who was born deaf, having inherited her mother's hearing disorder.

In Creed III, she uses sign language to communicate with her parents. Amara aspires to be a professional boxer just like her father. Early in the film, she gets in trouble at school after getting in a fight with a bully, prompting Donnie to decide to teach her how to box properly and to know when to fight.

Amara Creed is portrayed by Mila Davis-Kent.

Amara stars in the comic book Creed: Next Round, written by LaToya Morgan and Jai Jamison and illustrated by Wilton Santos, published by Boom! Studios, set ten years after Creed III, the series sees Amara become a boxer.

=== Union Cane ===
Union Cane is a fictional boxer in the 1990 film Rocky V. He is portrayed by real-life boxer Mike Williams.

Cane was born and raised in Cherry Hill, New Jersey, US. He began a career as a professional boxer, and began rising up the ranks to become the number one contender. He was represented by George Washington Duke, who was determined to get Cane in the ring with Rocky for a title match. Although Rocky was about to accept as he faced bankruptcy, he was diagnosed with brain damage and forced to retire, having already surrendered the title prior to his match with Ivan Drago. Union Cane fought for and won the vacant title in a tournament but was afforded little respect by the media, as he was seen as a 'paper champion' by reporters, since he had never faced the previous title holder. He was the world heavyweight champion when he faced Tommy "The Machine" Gunn, Duke's newest client who had been trained by Rocky, and was knocked out in the first round.

=== Jacob "Stitch" Duran ===
Jacob "Stitch" Duran is a professional cutman. In Rocky Balboa, he is Mason "The Line" Dixon's cutman. He returns in Creed and Creed II as part of Donnie Creed's corner.

Jacob "Stitch" Duran is portrayed by himself.

=== Danny "Stuntman" Wheeler ===
Danny "Stuntman" Wheeler is a heavyweight boxer from Los Angeles. He is the undefeated World Champion (WBA, WBC, Ring Magazine Champion) and #2 pound-for-pound boxer in the world behind "Pretty" Ricky Conlan. He fights Donnie Creed in a sparring session at Delphi Gym, where Donnie's father Apollo had also trained. Wheeler knocks Donnie out in under a minute, taking Donnie's Ford Mustang that was placed on the line. He is scheduled to fight "Pretty" Ricky Conlan for the titles but the fight is cancelled after Conlan breaks Wheeler's jaw at the weigh-ins. Wheeler attempts to sue Conlan and the WBC for the incident.

Three years later, Donnie defeats Wheeler for the WBC Heavyweight Championship and gets his Mustang back.

Danny "Stuntman" Wheeler is portrayed by Andre Ward.

=== Leo "The Lion" Sporino ===
Leo "The Lion" Sporino is an Italian-American light heavyweight boxer in Creed. Mentored by his father Pete Sporino at Mighty Mick's Boxing Gym, Leo participated in the 2012 U.S. Olympic team and is ranked #4 light heavyweight in the world. He is in the running for a championship run, but is knocked out in the second round of his match with Donnie Creed.

Leo "The Lion" Sporino is portrayed by a real-life boxer Gabriel Rosado.

=== Pete Sporino ===
Pete Sporino is an Italian-American former boxer turned trainer at Mighty Mick's Boxing Gym. He hopes to have Rocky mentor his son Leo, but is disappointed when Rocky opts to train Donnie Creed instead.

Pete Sporino is portrayed by Ritchie Coster.
