= Club fighter =

Professional boxer who fights locally with mediocre record

A club fighter (or clubfighter) is a professional boxer who usually fights locally and has a mediocre record. Club fighters generally are not nationally recognized and have not won any fights that show the ability to win a championship. The term is often used as a pejorative for over-hyped fighters or for older boxers in decline. As an example, Floyd Mayweather Jr. called Arturo Gatti "a blown-up club fighter", despite Gatti being the WBC super lightweight champion at the time.

A club fighter typically earns less respect than a contender, who defeats gatekeepers, journeymen, and other club fighters in order to establish themselves as a challenger for a world title. A journeyman is more respected than a club fighter — often by way of having a superficially good record.
