= 1976 Academy Awards =

1976 Academy Awards may refer to:

- 48th Academy Awards, the Academy Awards ceremony that took place in 1976
- 49th Academy Awards, the 1977 ceremony honoring the best in film for 1976
