= Adonis Creed =

Fictional character

- Rocky character
- Michael B. Jordan as Donnie Creed in Creed II (2018)
- First appearance: Creed (2015)
- Created by: Ryan Coogler; Aaron Covington
- Portrayed by: Michael B. Jordan; Alex Henderson (11-year-old); Thaddeus J. Mixon (15-year-old)

In-universe information
- Full name: Adonis "Hollywood" Johnson-Creed
- Nicknames: Donnie; Hollywood Donnie; Baby Creed; D (by Bianca)
- Title: 2-time World Heavyweight Champion (as of Creed III)
- Occupation: Professional boxer; Businessman (formerly)
- Affiliation: World Boxing Council
- Family: Apollo Creed (father; deceased); Mary Anne Creed (adoptive mother; deceased); Unnamed paternal half siblings; Ms. Johnson (biological mother; deceased)
- Spouse: Bianca Taylor (wife)
- Children: Amara Creed (daughter)
- Relatives: Rocky Balboa (surrogate uncle)

Adonis Creed
Personal information
- Born: June 1, 1986 (age 40) Chicago, Illinois, U.S.
- Height: 6 ft 1 in (1.85 m)
- Weight: 223 lb (101 kg)

Boxing career
- Weight class: Light heavyweight Cruiserweight; Heavyweight
- Reach: 72 in (183 cm)
- Stance: Orthodox

Boxing record
- Total fights: 29
- Wins: 28
- Win by KO: 27
- Losses: 1
- Draws: 0
- No contests: 0

Adonis "Donnie" Creed (born Adonis Johnson) is a fictional character and the protagonist of the Creed films— Creed (2015), Creed II (2018), and Creed III (2023) — the sequel series to the Rocky films. The character is played by Michael B. Jordan in all three installments.

In the fictional setting of the films, Donnie is the illegitimate son of the late and former world champion Apollo Creed, the result of an affair between him and a woman with the surname Johnson who died sometime in the 1990s. Donnie spends the first several years of his life in foster care and juvenile hall, until he is subsequently adopted by Mary Anne Creed, Apollo's widow. He lives a life of luxury and maintains a stable white-collar job, only to abandon it to pursue a lifelong dream of becoming a professional boxer. He goes to Philadelphia and convinces his late father's friend Rocky Balboa to train and mentor him.

== In film ==
=== Creed (2015) ===
Michael B. Jordan as Adonis "Donnie" Creed in Creed

In 1998, Adonis "Donnie" Johnson is spending time at a juvenile detention center in Los Angeles and frequently getting into fights with other inmates. As a result, he is sent to solitary confinement. Mary Anne Creed (Phylicia Rashad), Apollo's widow, meets with Donnie and adopts him; informing him that he is Apollo Creed's son (sired from an extramarital affair). Seventeen years later, in 2015, Donnie (using his biological mother's last name Johnson) is a wealthy young college graduate working at a securities firm at the Smith Boardley Financial Group. However, on weekends, he sneaks out to Tijuana to fight professional boxing matches against unheralded opponents and maintains an undefeated 15–0 record. Soon, Donnie resigns from his securities firm job to pursue his dream of becoming a boxer. Mary Anne vehemently opposes Donnie's ambition of becoming a boxer, remembering how her husband was killed in the ring during a match against Ivan Drago thirty years ago and how Rocky Balboa was forced into retirement after suffering brain damage. Donnie finds it hard to get anyone in Los Angeles to train him due to his father's death in the ring, particularly after he suffers an embarrassing loss in a sparring match to light heavyweight contender Danny "Stuntman" Wheeler (Andre Ward). Undaunted, Donnie moves out of his mother's residence and travels to Philadelphia in hopes of seeking out his father's best friend and former rival, Rocky (Sylvester Stallone).

Once in Philadelphia, Donnie meets Rocky at Adrian's Restaurant and tries to convince him to be his trainer. Having given up boxing, and believing Apollo wouldn't want his son to be a fighter, Rocky rejects his offer. However, Donnie's persistence eventually wins Rocky over. He forms a strong bond with Rocky and regards him as an uncle, even going so far as to call him "Unc" and introduce him to people as such. Meanwhile, Donnie forms a relationship with his downstairs neighbor, Bianca Taylor (Tessa Thompson), a singer-songwriter with progressive hearing loss. Donnie gets a match with Leo "The Lion" Sporino (Gabriel Rosado), the son of a trainer, who originally wanted Rocky to coach his son. He moves in with Rocky to train for the upcoming match. Rocky takes Donnie—now known as "Hollywood"—to the Front Street Gym to prepare with the help of several of Rocky's longtime friends, where Donnie markedly improves his hand speed, stamina, and defense. Prior to the match, Sporino's father learns that Donnie is in fact Apollo Creed's son. After Donnie wins the match in a second-round KO, Sporino's father alerts the media of Donnie's parentage. Meanwhile, World light heavyweight champion "Pretty" Ricky Conlan (Tony Bellew) is being forced into retirement due to an upcoming prison sentence and is gearing up for his final fight against Danny "Stuntman" Wheeler. After Conlan breaks Wheeler's jaw at the weigh-in for their title fight, Conlan's manager, Tommy Holiday (Graham McTavish), decides that the best way to end his career would be against the son of Apollo Creed. Conlan is against it but reluctantly agrees. Holiday meets with Rocky and Donnie, demanding that he should use the name Creed if he wants a shot at the light heavyweight title. Donnie is reluctant due to his desire to forge his own legacy. He only consents after Bianca persuades him to use Apollo's surname.

During one intense night of training, Rocky becomes ill and suddenly collapses before being taken to the hospital. He is diagnosed with Non-Hodgkin lymphoma but refuses to undergo chemotherapy, remembering that it wasn't enough to save his wife, Adrian. Donnie discovers pamphlets about the disease in Rocky's coat pocket after another late night training session, where Rocky tells Donnie that they are not family and that he has nothing to live for now that Adrian, his best friend and brother-in-law Paulie, Apollo, and his old coach Mickey, have died, and his son, Robert Jr., has moved away to Vancouver. Later on, a frustrated Donnie is about to attend a concert, where Bianca is about to perform. However, after a stranger insults him and his father, Donnie becomes irate, and attacks the stranger in a fit of rage before going on a violent outburst, prompting security to restrain him. Donnie is then arrested for assault and sent to jail. When Rocky comes to bail him out, Donnie is still upset, and tells off the former heavyweight champion, accusing him of getting Apollo killed in the ring.

Later, Donnie goes to Bianca's apartment to apologize and explain the situation. However, Bianca deems it best for her and Donnie to focus on their individual careers. She then closes the door and removes her hearing aids as Donnie continues to plead for forgiveness on the other side of the door. Donnie then meets up with Rocky, explaining that he is going to use the name Creed and fight against Conlan, but only if Rocky gets treatment for his illness. While Rocky is still sick, he still trains Donnie in the hospital room and back in his house.

The match takes place in Conlan's hometown of Liverpool, England, where Donnie is antagonized by Conlan, who refers to him as a “false Creed” at the press conference. Before the match, Bianca comes to their hotel at Rocky's behest, and the two reconcile. Mary Anne sends Donnie his father's iconic American flag boxing shorts; the back of the shorts bearing the name Johnson and the front bearing the name Creed. After some early struggles, Donnie regains by giving Conlan all he can handle. He ultimately goes the distance, even managing to knock Conlan down for the first time in his career as Bianca and the once-antagonistic crowd begin to cheer him on. Although he loses by split decision, Donnie gains the respect and admiration of Conlan and everyone watching.

Back in Philadelphia, Donnie and a frail but rather improving Rocky go up the Rocky Steps, representing a victory for both Rocky and Donnie in fighting their respective battles.

=== Creed II (2018) ===
Three years later, Donnie goes on to win six fights, all by knockout. At the beginning of Creed II, Donnie defeats Wheeler for the WBC World Heavyweight Championship by KO in the 4th round. Now that he's the champion, he proposes to Bianca, who accepts. When they are getting dinner one night in Philadelphia, they see that Ivan Drago's son Viktor has publicly challenged Donnie to a fight. Donnie talks with Rocky, who doesn't want Donnie to take the fight because of what happened to his late father thirty-three years earlier. Donnie gives Rocky an ultimatum that he will take the fight with or without Rocky, who declines.

Donnie and Bianca settle in Los Angeles to be closer to Mary Anne, and Bianca learns that she's pregnant. Donnie recruits Tony "Little Duke" Evers, the son of his father's trainer, to train him. Donnie, overwhelmed, rushes into the fight and gets seriously injured, but wins when Viktor is disqualified for punching Donnie when he is down. Donnie, with broken ribs, a ruptured kidney, and a concussion, becomes increasingly distant from Bianca and Mary Anne. Mary Anne eventually reaches out to Rocky, who comes out west to pay a visit with Donnie. Bianca goes into labor and gives birth to a healthy baby girl, Amara. However, Donnie and Bianca's fears are realized when the child is born deaf.

With Amara now in his life, Donnie comes to terms with the fact that he needs to be more open with the people closest to him. He also comes to terms that he has to fight Viktor again, and win. He promises to be there for his family, but asks them to be there for him. Rocky and Little Duke take Donnie to the desert to rigorously train his body from within to prepare for the fight, while Mary Anne, Bianca, and Amara provide a stable support system.

In the second match, Donnie is more accustomed to Viktor by fighting more comfortably in close range. Viktor has never had to fight past the 4th round, and while Viktor is winning on points, Donnie uses his stamina to his advantage later in the fight, despite having his ribs broken again. After a knockdown in the 10th round, Donnie unleashes a furious rage on a now exhausted Viktor, knocking him down twice and prompting Ivan Drago to throw in the towel to protect his son.

Donnie, having retained the title, visits Apollo's grave with Bianca and Amara, where he makes peace with his dad for carrying on his legacy while also building his own.

=== Creed III (2023) ===
In 2002 Los Angeles, a young Donnie Johnson sneaks out with his best friend, Golden Gloves champion Damian "Diamond Dame" Anderson, to watch him compete in an underground boxing match. After Dame's victory, he tells Donnie about his aspirations to turn professional and become a world champion. During a detour at a liquor store, Donnie impulsively attacks a man named Leon, and Dame is arrested while Donnie escapes.

In the present day, Donnie Creed has a rematch against Conlan for the heavyweight championship. Despite being hit several times, he studies Conlan's moves, which allows him to KO him in the next round, thereby winning the re-match and retaining his title. He then retires from boxing to focus on his wife Bianca and their daughter Amara, whose hearing impairment has since led the family to become fluent in American Sign Language. Donnie runs Delphi Boxing Academy with Tony "Little Duke" Evers Jr. and is promoting his protégé, world champion Felix "El Guerrero" Chavez, in a match against Viktor Drago.

Released from prison, Dame reconnects with Donnie and shares his desire to resume his boxing career. Donnie reluctantly invites Dame to the gym but his presence draws scorn from Chavez and Duke. Dame later visits Donnie's home, where he meets his family and recounts his childhood time together with Donnie when they were both in foster care, a story which Bianca has never heard before. Privately, Dame asks for a title shot against Chavez, but Donnie refuses. After Drago is attacked by an unknown assailant at a party for Bianca's record label, which casts doubt on his ability to participate in his upcoming fight, Donnie nominates Dame as Drago's replacement. Dame wins the unified WBC, WBO, and WBA heavyweight championships in a fight against Chavez at Crypto.com Arena.

Following the match, an uneasy Donnie visits his adoptive mother Mary-Anne Creed, who shows him letters Dame had written to Donnie while in prison that she kept from him due to her believing that he was a bad influence. One letter contains a picture showing Dame with a fellow inmate that Donnie recognizes as Drago's assailant. Realizing Dame orchestrated the attack, Donnie confronts him, and Dame admits that he manipulated him into getting the title shot.

Mary-Anne suffers another stroke and dies. After her funeral, Donnie confesses to Bianca about the night of Dame's arrest, revealing Leon to be the abusive caregiver in their group home before he was adopted. After Donnie attacked Leon at the liquor store, the ensuing brawl with Leon's friends caused Dame to pull a gun. After Dame was arrested, Donnie never contacted Dame out of guilt.

Publicly taunted by Dame and encouraged by Bianca, Donnie decides to come out of retirement and challenges Dame for the championship, which he accepts. After training with Duke and a recovered Drago, Donnie faces Dame in the "Battle of Los Angeles" at Dodger Stadium. In a grueling, evenly-matched affair, Donnie has visions of his abusive foster home and Dame's life in jail, and is knocked down in the final round. However, Donnie recovers and knocks out Dame to win the match and regain the championship. Afterward, Donnie reconciles with Dame, with Donnie apologizing to Dame for never checking up him when he was in prison, and both men admitting it was not the other's fault. Donnie joins Bianca and Amara in the ring in the empty stadium, where he pretends to box with Amara. As Donnie and his family leave the ring, he looks out on to the empty Dodger Stadium.

=== Creed: The Next Round ===
In July 2023, Boom Studios released Creed: The Next Round, written by LaToya Morgan and Jai Jamison and illustrated by Wilton Santos, starring Amara Creed and showcasing her fighting career ten years after Creed III, trained by Donnie and his half-sister Artemis.

== Casting and creation ==
Michael B. Jordan and Ryan Coogler had previously worked on Fruitvale Station together in 2013. Coogler contacted Jordan and presented him with the role of Apollo Creed's son. Jordan didn't use a body double in his scenes. Of his experience, Jordan stated, "I didn't get knocked out or anything like that, but yeah there were definitely some slips, some jabs, some body punches." Jordan had a strict diet in preparation for the role: "I stripped down my diet completely. Grilled chicken, brown rice, broccoli and a lot of water. I worked out two to three times a day, six days a week. And ... if you do that consistently for about 10 months your body will change." Ryan Coogler stated that "That was [Jordan] taking real punches" and became "routinely bloodied, bruised and dizzy" from his fight scenes with Andre Ward, Gabriel Rosado, and Tony Bellew, all of whom are professional boxers. Gabriel Rosado stated of Jordan's boxing skills, "Michael can throw down man. If you sleep on him in the street he might put you to sleep."

Ryan Coogler was inspired to make Creed from his experiences with his own father: "He used to play Rocky before I had football games to pump me up, and he would get really emotional watching the movies. He used to watch Rocky II with his mom while she was sick and dying of cancer. She died when he was 18 years old. And so when he got sick he was losing his strength because he had a muscular condition. He was having trouble getting around, having trouble carrying stuff. I started thinking about this idea of my dad’s mortality. For me he was kind of like this mythical figure, my father, similar to what Rocky was for him. Going through it inspired me to make a film that told a story about his hero going through something similar to kind of motivate him and cheer him up. That’s how I came up with the idea for this movie." Although Sylvester Stallone was initially reluctant to help out with the film, he changed his mind upon meeting with Coogler and Jordan. In discussing Stallone's advice to him, Jordan said that he "taught me how to throw punches and hit me in my chest a couple times.".

== Personality ==
Donnie is torn between trying to preserve his father's legacy and build his own. A.O. Scott of The New York Times wrote that, Donnie is "a complex character with a complex fate. He is at once a rich kid and a street kid, the proud carrier of an illustrious heritage and an invisible man. His relationship with Rocky is complicated, too. The older fighter is a mentor and a father figure, to be sure, but he also needs someone to take care of him, especially when illness adds a melodramatic twist to the plot. Donnie has been described as "arrogant". Although Donnie's circumstances change after he is adopted by Mary Anne Creed, his late father's widow, he retains his fiery personality. Short-tempered and impulsive, but good-natured, it is Donnie's tenacity that convinces Rocky to train him. Michael O' Sullivan of The Washington Post analyzed that Donnie's "struggles with his temper" are "a coping mechanism that helps him deal with the fear of not living up to the name Creed."

Jordan states of Donnie, "My character is living in the shadow of his dad, who is arguably the greatest fighter that ever lived, and he really has to embrace that to move forward. I could understand wanting to have your own legacy and trying to find your own lane". Donnie's hubris initially causes him to refuse to embrace the name Creed, instead using his mother's surname, Johnson. Only with his girlfriend Bianca's encouragement does Donnie eventually come to accept the name. When Donnie meets Rocky and reveals to him that he is Apollo's son and that he wants the elder former boxer to train him, Rocky questions, "Why would you pick a fighter's life when you don't need to?" He immediately notes that Donnie is well-educated and comes from a wealthy background, which contrasts Rocky's own upbringing. However, Rocky sees in Donnie the drive and determination in himself and Apollo when he was younger, and concedes in training him. After Rocky is diagnosed with non-Hodgkin's lymphoma, it is Donnie who motivates him and teaches him to fight again: "[Donnie] is there to push [Rocky] the same way Rocky pushes him in the gym and in the ring." Donnie pays tribute to Rocky, his father, and his country by wearing the classic American flag shorts in his debut professional match that Apollo and Balboa sported in their bouts against Ivan Drago. However, Donnie' shorts have the name Johnson on the back and Creed on the front, symbolizing that he can both preserve his father's legacy and still make his own.

== Reception ==
The character of Donnie Creed and Jordan's portrayal of the character have received critical acclaim. Aisha Harris of Slate stated, "I feared signing on to Creed might derail Coogler’s and Jordan’s careers. Instead, this revitalizing crowd-pleaser solidifies my belief that these two have the potential to create really great art." "In a performance that should help his fans forget Fantastic Four, Jordan is flat-out terrific", said reviewer Calvin Wilson. A.O. Scott of The New York Times noted that "Mr. Jordan’s limitations...have yet to be discovered. With every role, he seems to delight in the unfolding of his talent, and to pass his excitement along to the audience." David Sims of The Atlantic said, "Coogler and Jordan...create a protagonist of color who avoids the stereotypes of many of Hollywood’s black heroes while still being celebrated as one. Donnie is an easy hero for everyone to cheer for, but he’s not thinly painted. Scenes where he runs through Philadelphia followed by cheering kids on bikes are especially memorable—they celebrate the film’s myth-making without putting the hero on an unreachable pedestal." Reviewers praised Donnie's relationship with Bianca; Peter Travers of Rolling Stone stated that, "the romance [that Donnie] has with his own Adrian, R&B singer Bianca (a terrific Tessa Thompson), feels sexually frisky and freshly conceived." Stephanie Zacharek of Time says, "Jordan’s face, in particular, is the kind you feel protective of. He’s charismatic in a totally carefree way—you never catch him trying too hard, and his scenes with Thompson have a lovely, bantering lyricism."

Preceded by Danny "Stuntman" Wheeler	WBC World Heavyweight Champion; 2018–present	Succeeded by Incumbent
