= Ivan Drago =

Fictional character from Rocky films

Ivan Drago Иван Драго The Siberian Express
- Rocky character
- Dolph Lundgren as Ivan Drago in Rocky IV (1985)
- First appearance: Rocky IV (1985)
- Last appearance: Creed II (2018)
- Created by: Sylvester Stallone
- Portrayed by: Dolph Lundgren

In-universe information
- Nicknames: The Siberian Express; The Siberian Bull; Death from Above; The Russian Robot; Russia's Most Lethal
- Title: Infantry Captain (Soviet Ground Forces)
- Occupation: Professional Boxer, Boxing Manager and Coach; Soldier
- Affiliation: Soviet Army
- Spouse: Ludmilla Vobet (divorced)
- Children: Viktor Drago
- Nationality: Soviet; Russian

Ivan Drago
Personal information
- Born: February 23, 1961 (age 65) Moscow, Russia
- Height: 6 ft 7 in (201 cm)
- Weight: 261 lb (118 kg)

Boxing career
- Reach: 87 in (221 cm)
- Stance: Orthodox

Boxing record
- Total fights: 2
- Wins: 1 (1 win by TKO in exhibition with Creed)
- Win by KO: 1
- Losses: 1
- Draws: 0

Ivan Vasilyevich Drago (Russian: Иван Васильевич Драго, pronounced [ɪˈvan vɐˈsʲilʲjɪvʲɪdʑ ˈdraɡə]) is a fictional character from the Rocky film series. He first appears in the 1985 film Rocky IV, in which he is the main antagonist and rival of Rocky Balboa and is also responsible for the death of Apollo Creed after brutally defeating him in their match. He also appears in the 2018 film Creed II, in which he is the main antagonist and serves as the trainer to his son Viktor. He is portrayed by Swedish and American actor and martial artist Dolph Lundgren in both films. A poll of former heavyweight champions and prominent boxing writers ranked Drago as the third-best fighter in the Rocky film series.

== Character biography ==
Ivan Drago is an Olympic gold medalist and a boxing champion from the Soviet Union, who had an amateur record of 100–0–0 wins (100 KO). Drago is carefully fitted and trained to be the consummate fighter. His heart rate and punching power are constantly measured via computers during his workouts. Drago is seen receiving intramuscular injections in the movie, implied to be anabolic steroids, though the actual nature of the injected solution is never explicitly stated; instead, Ludmilla, his wife, states as a joke that Drago is like Popeye and eats spinach every day.

Ivan Drago left Russia and moved to Ukraine to look after his son Viktor Drago following his loss to Rocky.

Drago was married to another Soviet athlete, Ludmilla Vobet (Brigitte Nielsen), who is mentioned to be a double gold medalist in swimming. She is much more articulate than Drago, who seldom talks, and always speaks on his behalf at press conferences and interviews. In Creed II, it is revealed that Drago and Ludmilla had divorced as a result of his loss to Rocky Balboa and he is now raising their son – himself a professional boxer – alone.

=== Rocky IV ===
Drago's trainers, Sergei Igor Rimsky (George Rogan) and Manuel Vega (James "Cannonball" Green), along with his wife Ludmilla (née Vobet) (Brigitte Nielsen), are convinced that he can defeat any boxer. Drago enters professional heavyweight boxing in the beginning of the movie.

Former champion Apollo Creed (Carl Weathers), now 43 years old, comes out of retirement to challenge Drago to an exhibition match, assisted by Creed's former rival Rocky Balboa (Sylvester Stallone). Creed arrives to the ring wearing his signature Stars & Stripes boxing garb to "Living in America", sung by James Brown, dancing upon a huge stage that is lowered into Drago's ring. Before the match begins, Drago mutters "You will lose."

At the beginning of the fight, a confident Apollo dances around the Soviet boxer, flicking jabs at Drago. But then Drago connects with a series of powerful blows, proving Apollo is no match for the younger and stronger Russian fighter. Drago even continues to hit Creed after the bell is rung to end the round, despite this being an exhibition match, leaving Apollo bloodied and slumped against the ropes. Rocky is ready to throw in the towel, but Apollo orders him not to as the second round begins. Drago continues to attack Apollo without mercy, and Rocky is ready to go against his wishes and end the fight, however he hesitates due to Apollo's refusal. This turns out to be a fatal mistake, as Drago lands a final hard punch that not only knocks him out, but fatally injures him, resulting in his death minutes later as he was cradled by Rocky.

Drago exhibits no remorse, coldly stating "if he dies, he dies", claiming he will soon "defeat a real champion". Apollo does indeed die, succumbing to his injuries. Rocky decides to fight Drago to avenge Apollo's death, and when the boxing commission refuses to allow it, Rocky surrenders his World Heavyweight Title to fight Drago in an unsanctioned bout, arranged to take place on Drago's home turf in Moscow on Christmas Day. After weeks of training in the Russian mountains, and after an initially reluctant Adrian arrives to support him, Rocky is ready to take on Drago. Unlike the match with Apollo, Drago comes out on the offensive and overpowers Rocky for the first round and much of the second, until Rocky manages to cause a deep cut below Drago's right eye. With Drago's ego shaken, and Rocky's determination fully empowered, the fight eventually becomes a long, drawn-out war between the two. To everyone's shock, Rocky manages to withstand Drago's savage hits and starts wearing him down, to the point where the Russian crowd begins to cheer for Rocky, whereas at the start of the fight, they were hostile to him. Drago's trainer—a Soviet/East German official—insults him, claiming that by allowing an American to fight so admirably on Russian soil, Drago is disgracing the Soviet Union. The enraged Drago grabs him by the throat, throws him out of the ring, and proclaims he only fights for himself. Immediately preceding the final round, Rocky and Drago meet in the middle of the ring where the two men touch gloves as Drago says to Rocky, "To the end". Rocky finally defeats Drago by KO in the dying seconds of the 15th and final round.

=== Rocky V ===
It is revealed that the punishment Drago inflicted on Rocky left him with traumatic brain injuries (specifically diagnosed as cavum septi pellucidi [CSP]), causing issues with his memory and leading him to experience both visual and auditory hallucinations. During Rocky's fight with Tommy Gunn, Rocky sees visions of Drago killing Apollo while believing he is about to suffer the same fate at Tommy's hands. Balboa is saved when he witnesses the ghostly, fragmented dream figure of his old trainer, Mickey, exhorting Rocky to get up and fight one more time, thus inspiring him to defeat Tommy.

=== Creed II ===
33 years after his loss to Rocky, Drago was disgraced by the USSR and Ludmilla left him to raise their son, Viktor, on his own. Following the end of the Cold War, Drago was forced to move to Ukraine, where he lived a modest life while relentlessly training Viktor to be an even more formidable boxer than he was. After Viktor knocks out every opponent he faces in Ukraine and Adonis "Donnie" Creed wins the World Heavyweight Championship, Drago, Viktor, and promoter Buddy Marcelle travel to Philadelphia to issue a challenge to Donnie for the title. Drago visits Rocky in his restaurant to tell him how Rocky cost him everything, and threatens to avenge his loss through Viktor, telling Rocky, "My son will break your boy."

After Donnie accepts the fight and Rocky refuses to train him, Drago intensifies Viktor's training regimen adding weighted chin ups, and battle rope push ups. During the weigh in, Drago taunts Donnie, telling him he is much smaller than Apollo was. Donnie shoves Drago and a scrum breaks out between the two champs.

Viktor pummels Donnie, breaking his ribs and brutally injuring his kidneys, but is disqualified for landing a punch on Donnie while he was down. With Donnie injured and his confidence shattered, Viktor ascends to the top of the boxing world thanks to his unmatched power punches, and Drago's good standing with Russia is partially restored. Ludmilla appears during a dinner meeting, causing Viktor to storm out in disgust. He scolds Drago for seeking validation from the very people who turned their backs on him when he needed them.

Still lacking a true championship belt, the Dragos challenge Donnie to a rematch in Russia. Ivan pushes Viktor to his limit in training for the bout. However, Rocky trains Donnie to accustom his body to repeatedly absorb heavy impact, and uses Viktor's lack of technique and reliance on power punches to his advantage. Viktor enters the tenth round with a slight lead, but begins to tire, as he had never gone past the fourth round in prior matches without knocking his opponent out. Donnie knocks Viktor down twice in the round, causing a number of Viktor's supporters, including Ludmilla, to leave the fight. Seeing that his son is unable to defend himself and might end up like Apollo, Drago throws in the towel, stopping the fight and allowing Donnie to emerge victorious. Drago hugs Viktor after the fight, assuring him that it is okay and that he is proud.

Finally at peace with his past, Ivan focuses on developing a deeper bond with his son, accepting his failure to improve on his legacy.

== Personality ==
Unlike the flamboyant Apollo Creed and the brash James "Clubber" Lang, Rocky's opponents in the first and second, and third previous films, respectively, Ivan Drago is reserved and observant. Driven by his desire to be the best at all costs, Drago focuses on this single-minded manner in which he pursues his goal, and it deprives him of his humanity. Many viewers and critics have suggested that Drago was meant to symbolize the U.S. perception of the Soviets: immense, powerful, and emotionless. This is made evident by his no holds barred beat down of Creed in an exhibition match as well as by his nonchalant reaction toward news of his opponent's death. Drago generally allows his wife and trainers to talk on his behalf to the press. In the original film, the character only speaks in terse, short statements. For Creed II, Stallone added more lines for the character than the original film, developing Drago to be more bitter towards Rocky for his current life and determined to retake his past glory through his son.

=== Rocky IV - Rocky vs Drago Directors Cut ===
In this director's cut edition of the film, from Stallone himself, Drago is positioned as more of an individual experiencing inner conflict between being an instrument of the Soviets and of his own ambition as a 'warrior'. More lines of dialogue in the opening fight scenes and the press conference scenes humanize his character and detract from the stereotype purveyed in the original theatrical cut. The juxtaposition of Rocky as the 'pure' American hero versus the Soviet machine is instead reimagined as a more nuanced warrior versus warrior affair, with the backdrop of the politicizing of the fighting being a source of conflict rather than the reason for the contest.

== Reception ==
Commentaries on Drago often characterize him as a hyperbolic representation of Soviet power in the context of the latter part of the Cold War. This symbolism is particularly clear in some lines in the film, including the radio announcer who says, "Ivan Drago is a man with an entire country in his corner." Others have characterized Drago in contrast to Rocky, the prototypically U.S. hero, and that Drago's defeat represents a crumbling of the Soviet regime.

Some, however, have noticed Drago's individualism. Toward the conclusion of the fourth film, when Drago is confronted by a Communist Party functionary, the fighter from the collectivist USSR screams at the top of his lungs, "I fight to win FOR ME!! FOR ME!!!" Drago wants to win, but not for the crowd, not for his nation, not for the communist party, not for the Politburo. He wants to win for himself.

In 2004, The Washington Times referenced Ivan Drago in a comparison of the Soviet-U.S. Olympic rivalry of the Cold War: "Nationalism makes the Olympics worth watching. Jingoism makes them worth caring about." The Times's Patrick Hruby noted that without an embodiment of the rivalry like Ivan Drago, the Olympics were not as fun.

Russia's "goodwill ambassador" Katya Lycheva of the 1980s objected to the character Ivan Drago, claiming that the film uses him "to vilify the Russian people".

== In popular culture ==
The ABC podcast Finding Drago explores the influence of Ivan Drago on contemporary writers, fan-fiction novelists and comedians.

== Legacy ==
Drago's physical appearance has been compared to Norwegian footballer Erling Haaland. Their similarities became subject to a meme in 2022 after the player signed for Manchester City.

== Bibliography ==
- Strada, Michael J.; Troper, Harold R. (1997). Friend Or Foe?: Russians in American Film and Foreign Policy, 1933-1991. Scarecrow Press. ISBN 0810832453.

Preceded by James "Clubber" Lang	Rocky Balboa's main opponent	Succeeded by Tommy Gunn
