= List of awards and nominations received by Ryan Coogler =

Ryan Coogler awards and nominations
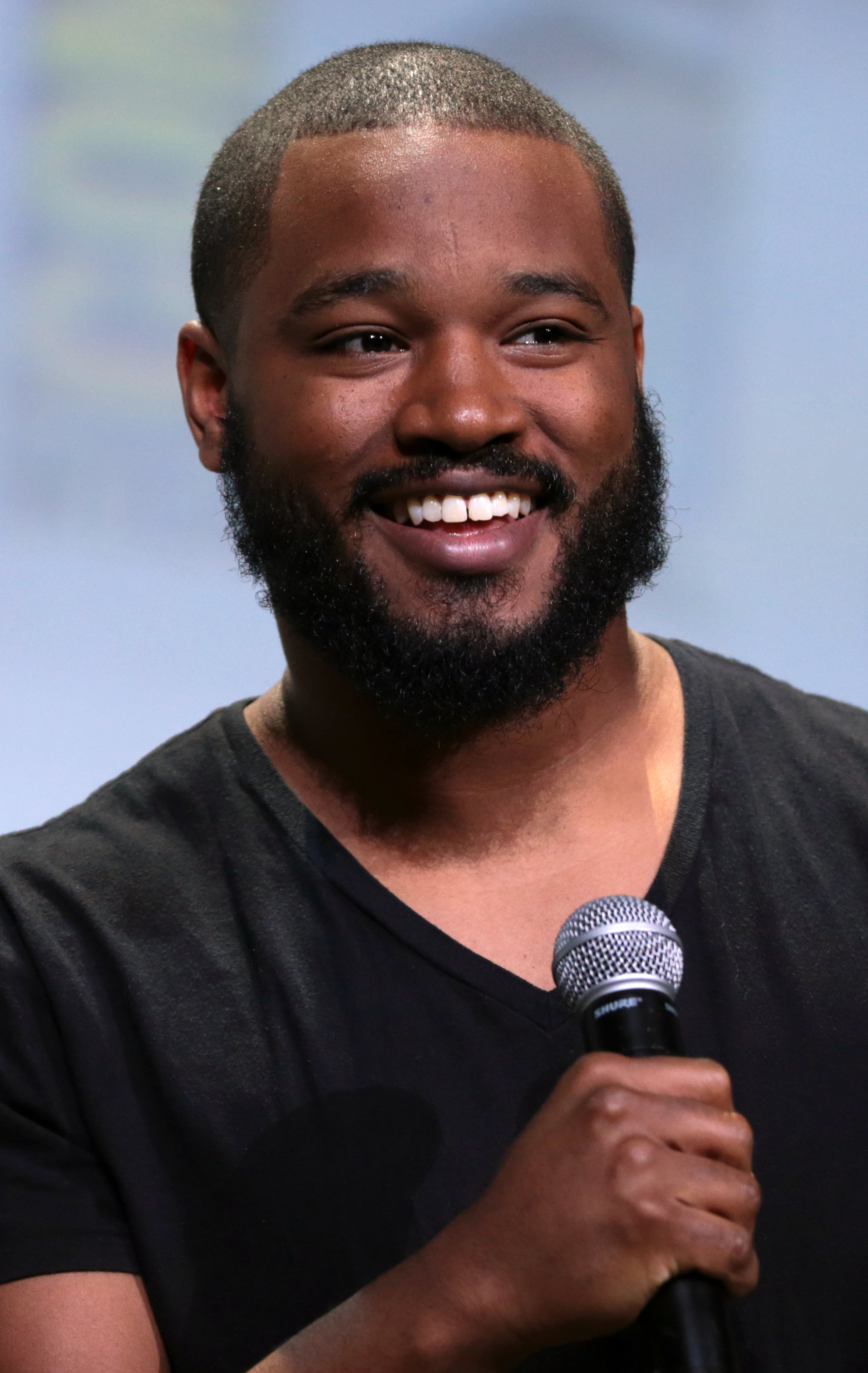
- Coogler at San Diego Comic-Con in 2016
Awards and nominations
Award	Wins	Nominations
Academy Awards	1	5
BAFTA Awards	1	3
Critics' Choice Awards	1	5
Directors Guild of America Awards	0	1
Emmy Awards	0	2
Golden Globe Awards	1	4
Grammy Awards	1	3
Producers Guild of America Awards	0	1
Writers Guild of America Awards	1	3

Totals (Note: Certain award groups do not simply award one winner. They acknowledge several different recipients, have runners-up, and have third place. Since this is a specific recognition and is different from losing an award, runner-up mentions are considered wins in this award tally. For simplification and to avoid errors, each award in this list has been presumed to have had a prior nomination.)
- Wins: 27
- Nominations: 67

Ryan Coogler is an American filmmaker. He is known for writing and directing franchise films and blockbusters and has received various accolades, including an Academy Award, a British Academy Film Award (BAFTA), a Critics' Choice Award, a Golden Globe Award, and a Grammy Award.

Coogler made his feature-length debut with the independent film Fruitvale Station (2013), winning prizes at both the Sundance Film Festival and the Cannes Film Festival, before transitioning to directing and writing franchise films such as the Rocky series spinoff Creed (2015), as well as the Marvel films Black Panther (2018) and Black Panther: Wakanda Forever (2022). Coogler has also produced the historical drama Judas and the Black Messiah (2021), for which he was nominated for the Academy Award for Best Picture. He co-wrote the song "Lift Me Up" with Rihanna and Nigerian singer Tems for the Black Panther: Wakanda Forever soundtrack (2022), which earned him nominations for the Academy Award for Best Original Song, the Critics' Choice Movie Award for Best Song, the Golden Globe Award for Best Original Song, and the Grammy Award for Best Song Written for Visual Media.

Coogler directed, wrote and produced the 2025 horror film Sinners, which received unanimous acclaim both from critics and audiences alike. It earned him three Academy Award nominations, including Best Picture, Best Director and Best Original Screenplay. The film broke the Oscars' all-time nomination record, earning 16 nods and surpassing the previous mark of 14.. It also earned him nominations for three BAFTA Awards, three Critics' Choice Awards, winning Best Original Screenplay, three Golden Globe Awards, winning Best Cinematic and Box Office Achievement, the Directors Guild of America Award for Outstanding Directing in a Feature Film, and the Producers Guild of America Award for Best Theatrical Motion Picture. He also won the Grammy Award for Best Compilation Soundtrack for Visual Media for the film's accompanying soundtrack.

== Major associations ==
=== Academy Awards ===
Year	Category	Nominated work	Result	Ref.
2020	Best Picture	Judas and the Black Messiah	Nominated	
2022	Best Original Song	"Lift Me Up" (from Black Panther: Wakanda Forever)	Nominated	
2025	Best Picture	Sinners	Nominated	
2025	Best Director	Sinners	Nominated	
2025	Best Original Screenplay	Sinners	Won	

=== BAFTA Awards ===
Year	Category	Nominated work	Result	Ref.
British Academy Film Awards
2025	Best Film	Sinners	Nominated	
2025	Best Direction	Sinners	Nominated	
2025	Best Original Screenplay	Sinners	Won	

=== Critics' Choice Awards ===
Year	Category	Nominated work	Result	Ref.
Critics' Choice Movie Awards
2018	Best Adapted Screenplay	Black Panther	Nominated	
2022	Best Song	"Lift Me Up" (from Black Panther: Wakanda Forever)	Nominated	
2025	Best Picture	Sinners	Nominated	
2025	Best Director	Sinners	Nominated	
2025	Best Original Screenplay	Sinners	Won	

=== Emmy Awards ===
Year	Category	Nominated work	Result	Ref.
News and Documentary Emmy Awards
2026	Best Documentary	Hurricane Katrina: Race Against Time	Nominated	
2026	Outstanding Historical Documentary	Hurricane Katrina: Race Against Time	Nominated	

=== Golden Globes ===
Year	Category	Nominated work	Result	Ref.
2022	Best Original Song	"Lift Me Up" (from Black Panther: Wakanda Forever)	Nominated	
2025	Best Motion Picture – Drama	Sinners	Nominated	
2025	Best Director	Sinners	Nominated	
2025	Best Screenplay	Sinners	Nominated	
2025	Cinematic and Box Office Achievement	Sinners	Won	

=== Grammy Awards ===
Year	Category	Nominated work	Result	Ref.
2023	Best Song Written for Visual Media	"Lift Me Up"	Nominated	
2023	Best Compilation Soundtrack Album for Visual Media	Black Panther: Wakanda Forever – Music From And Inspired By	Nominated	
2025	Best Compilation Soundtrack Album for Visual Media	Sinners	Won	

=== Guilds of America Awards ===
Year	Category	Nominated work	Result	Ref.
Directors Guild of America Awards
2025	Outstanding Directorial Achievement in Theatrical Feature Film	Sinners	Nominated	
Producers Guild of America Awards
2021	Best Theatrical Motion Picture	Judas and the Black Messiah	Nominated	
2026	Best Theatrical Motion Picture	Sinners	Nominated	
Writers Guild of America Awards
2018	Best Adapted Screenplay	Black Panther	Nominated	
2022	Best Adapted Screenplay	Black Panther: Wakanda Forever	Nominated	
2025	Best Original Screenplay	Sinners	Won	

=== NAACP Image Awards ===
Year	Category	Nominated work	Result	Ref.
2014	Outstanding Independent Motion Picture	Fruitvale Station	Won	
2016	Outstanding Motion Picture	Creed	Nominated	
2016	Outstanding Directing in a Motion Picture	Creed	Won	
2016	Outstanding Writing in a Motion Picture	Creed	Won	
2019	Outstanding Motion Picture	Black Panther	Won	
2019	Outstanding Directing in a Motion Picture	Black Panther	Won	
2019	Outstanding Writing in a Motion Picture	Black Panther	Won	
2019	Entertainer of the Year	Black Panther	Nominated	
2023	Outstanding Motion Picture	Black Panther: Wakanda Forever	Won	
2023	Outstanding Direction in a Motion Picture	Black Panther: Wakanda Forever	Nominated	
2023	Outstanding Writing in a Motion Picture	Black Panther: Wakanda Forever	Won	
2023	Outstanding Soundtrack/Compilation Album	Black Panther: Wakanda Forever	Won	
2024	Outstanding Podcast – Limited Series/Short Form	Black Panther: Wakanda Forever	Won	
2026	Outstanding Motion Picture	Sinners	Won	
2026	Outstanding Directing in a Motion Picture	Sinners	Won	
2026	Outstanding Writing in a Motion Picture	Sinners	Won	
2026	Outstanding Soundtrack/Compilation Album	Sinners	Won	

== Miscellaneous awards ==
Year	Award	Category	Nominated work	Result	Ref.
2013	Cannes Film Festival	Prix de l'Avenir d'Un Certain Regard	Fruitvale Station	Won	
2013	Cannes Film Festival	Grand Prix d'Un Certain Regard	Fruitvale Station	Nominated	
2013	Cannes Film Festival	Caméra d'Or	Fruitvale Station	Nominated	
2013	Gotham Awards	Bingham Ray Breakthrough Director Award	Fruitvale Station	Won	
2013	Nantucket Film Festival	Vimeo Award for Best Writer/Director	Fruitvale Station	Won	
2013	National Board of Review	Best Directorial Debut	Fruitvale Station	Won	
2013	Sundance Film Festival	Audience Award: U.S. Dramatic	Fruitvale Station	Won	
2013	Sundance Film Festival	Grand Jury Prize: U.S. Dramatic	Fruitvale Station	Won	
2014	Black Reel Awards	Outstanding Film	Fruitvale Station	Nominated	
2014	Black Reel Awards	Outstanding Director	Fruitvale Station	Nominated	
2014	Black Reel Awards	Outstanding Screenplay, Adapted or Original	Fruitvale Station	Nominated	
2014	Independent Spirit Awards	Best First Feature	Fruitvale Station	Won	
2014	Satellite Awards	Honorary Satellite Award	Fruitvale Station	Won	
2016	Black Reel Awards	Outstanding Film	Creed	Won	
2016	Black Reel Awards	Outstanding Director	Creed	Won	
2016	Black Reel Awards	Outstanding Original or Adapted Screenplay (with Aaron Covington)	Creed	Won	
2016	Empire Awards	Best Director	Creed	Nominated	
2019	Saturn Awards	Best Director	Black Panther	Won	
2019	Saturn Awards	Best Writing (with Joe Robert Cole)	Black Panther	Nominated	
2019	Satellite Awards	Auteur Award	Black Panther	Won	
2019	USC Scripter Award	Best Adapted Screenplay (with Joe Robert Cole)	Black Panther	Nominated	
2019	Black Reel Awards	Outstanding Film	Black Panther	Won	
2019	Black Reel Awards	Outstanding Director	Black Panther	Won	
2019	Black Reel Awards	Outstanding Screenplay (with Joe Robert Cole)	Black Panther	Nominated	
2022	Golden Raspberry Awards	Worst Picture	Space Jam: A New Legacy	Nominated	
2022	Hollywood Music in Media Awards	Best Original Song in a Feature Film (for "Lift Me Up")	Black Panther: Wakanda Forever	Won	
2023	Black Reel Awards	Outstanding Film	Black Panther: Wakanda Forever	Nominated	
2023	Black Reel Awards	Outstanding Director	Black Panther: Wakanda Forever	Nominated	
2023	Black Reel Awards	Outstanding Screenplay	Black Panther: Wakanda Forever	Nominated	
2023	Black Reel Awards	Outstanding Soundtrack	Black Panther: Wakanda Forever	Won	
2023	Hugo Award	Best Dramatic Presentation, Long Form (with Joe Robert Cole)	Black Panther: Wakanda Forever	Nominated	
2026	Astra Film Awards	Best Director	Sinners	Won	
2026	Black Reel Awards	Outstanding Film	Sinners	Won	
2026	Black Reel Awards	Outstanding Director	Sinners	Won	
2026	Black Reel Awards	Outstanding Screenplay	Sinners	Won	
2026	Black Reel Awards	Outstanding Soundtrack	Sinners	Won	
2026	Bram Stoker Award	Screenplay	Sinners	Won	
2026	Independent Spirit Awards	Best New Non-Scripted or Documentary Series (as executive producer)	Hurricane Katrina: Race Against Time	Nominated	
2026	National Board of Review	Top Ten Films	Sinners	Won	
2026	National Board of Review	Best Original Screenplay	Sinners	Won	

== Critics awards ==
Year	Award	Category	Nominated work	Result	Ref.
2013	Austin Film Critics Association	Best First Film	Fruitvale Station	Won	
2013	Boston Online Film Critics Association	Best New Filmmaker	Fruitvale Station	Won	
2013	Chicago Film Critics Association	Most Promising Filmmaker	Fruitvale Station	Nominated	
2013	Detroit Film Critics Society	Best Breakthrough	Fruitvale Station	Nominated	
2013	Las Vegas Film Critics Society	Breakout Filmmaker of the Year	Fruitvale Station	Won	
2013	New York Film Critics Online	Best Debut Director	Fruitvale Station	Won	
2013	Phoenix Film Critics Society	Breakthrough Performance Behind the Camera	Fruitvale Station	Nominated	
2013	San Francisco Film Critics Circle	Marlon Riggs Award	Fruitvale Station	Won	
2013	Central Ohio Film Critics	Breakthrough Film Artist	Fruitvale Station	Nominated	
2015	African-American Film Critics Association	Best Director	Creed	Nominated	
2015	Indiana Film Journalists Association	Best Director	Creed	Nominated	
2015	Las Vegas Film Critics Society	Best Director	Creed	Nominated	
2015	Los Angeles Film Critics Association	New Generation Award	Creed	Won	
2015	New York Film Critics Online	Best Director	Creed	Nominated	
2018	African-American Film Critics Association	Best Director	Black Panther	Won	
2018	Alliance of Women Film Journalists	Best Screenplay, Adapted (with Joe Robert Cole)	Black Panther	Nominated	
2018	San Francisco Film Critics Circle	Best Adapted Screenplay (with Joe Robert Cole)	Black Panther	Nominated	
2018	Washington D.C. Area Film Critics Association	Best Director	Black Panther	Nominated	
2018	Washington D.C. Area Film Critics Association	Best Adapted Screenplay (with Joe Robert Cole)	Black Panther	Nominated	
2018	Georgia Film Critics Association	Best Adapted Screenplay (with Joe Robert Cole)	Black Panther	Nominated	
2026	Los Angeles Film Critics Association	Best Director	Sinners	Runner-up	
2026	London Film Critics Circle	Film of the Year	Sinners	Nominated	
2026	London Film Critics Circle	Director of the Year	Sinners	Nominated	
2026	London Film Critics Circle	Screenwriter of the Year	Sinners	Nominated	
2026	Toronto Film Critics Association	Best Film	Sinners	Nominated	
2026	Toronto Film Critics Association	Best Director	Sinners	Nominated	
2026	Toronto Film Critics Association	Best Screenplay	Sinners	Won	

== Honorary awards ==
Organizations	Year	Accolade	Result	Ref.
Time Magazine	2013	List of the 30 people under 30	Honored	
Time Magazine	2018	Person of the Year	Runner-up	
Time Magazine	2018	List of Time 100 Influential People	Honored	
