= Homeroom (2021 film) =

2021 American Documentary Film

- Poster
- Directed by: Peter Nicks
- Story by: Peter Nicks; Sean Havey; Kristina Motwani
- Produced by: Sean Havey; Peter Nicks
- Cinematography: Sean Havey
- Edited by: Rebecca Adorno; Kristina Motwani
- Music by: Mike Tuccillo
- Production companies: Proximity Media; Concordia Studio; XTR; Open'hood
- Distributed by: Hulu
- Release dates: January 29, 2021 (Sundance); August 12, 2021 (United States)
- Running time: 90 minutes
- Country: United States
- Language: English

Homeroom is a 2021 American documentary film directed and produced by Peter Nicks. The film, which is the final chapter of Nicks' Oakland trilogy (following The Waiting Room and The Force), follows the lives of the Oakland High School class of 2020 as they try to make the most of their final year in high school amidst district budget cuts and ultimately the COVID-19 pandemic and the George Floyd protests. Ryan Coogler and Davis Guggenheim, the latter of whom made a similar film, Waiting for "Superman", were executive producers on this film.

The film was premiered at the 2021 Sundance Film Festival on January 29, 2021, where it was the inaugural winner of the Jonathan Oppenheim Editing Award - U.S. Documentary. It was released on Hulu on August 12, 2021.

== Synopsis ==
The film follows the students of Oakland High School's Class of 2020 as they face an unprecedented year. Anxiety over test scores and college applications is giving way to uncertainty over a rapidly developing pandemic.

== Release ==
The film premiered at the 2021 Sundance Film Festival on January 29, 2021. On April 20, 2021, Hulu acquired the film's U.S. distribution rights and set it for an August 12, 2021 release.

== Reception ==
=== Critical response ===
The review round-up at Rotten Tomatoes for Homeroom had 85% of critics recommending the film, based on 47 reviews and an average rating of 7 out of 10. The critics consensus reads: "Homeroom offers an encouraging -- and engaging -- look at young people preparing to leave high school behind and shape the future." Metacritic assigned the film a weighted average score of 68 out of 100, based on 12 critics, indicating "generally favorable reviews". Daniel Fienberg of The Hollywood Reporter wrote "You don't need heavy-handed foreshadowing to know that the class of 2020 is the COVID Class, to realize that the prom the bright-faced teens are looking forward to will never happen, that the graduation they're aiming for will be virtual, that the production of In the Heights scheduled to open on March 20 is never going to see its curtain raised. Homeroom is, in that sense, an inspiring tragedy, a portrait of resilient youth in unprecedented circumstances, the sort of thing that hasn't yet oversaturated Sundance, but probably eventually will.

Brian Tallerico of RogerEbert.com wrote:

"Nicks takes a verité approach to his subject, documenting students through the ups and downs of their final year in high school at a distance, letting them tell their own stories. The focus of the first half falls on a debate that would echo “Defund the Police” months later as students and community members fight the board about removing police officers from Oakland High School. Like a bit too much of “Homeroom,” I could have watched these board meetings for hours, Wiseman-style. The debate over adults who think that officers keep their kids safe opposite students telling them that uniforms don’t equal safety for a lot of young people is fascinating. And it’s wonderful to hear these young people discuss their concerns so openly, even if a lot of them seem to often fall on deaf ears."

Lisa Kennedy of Variety wrote:

"The Oakland students — and director Nicks — rise to the demands of overlapping crises. With its vibrant if abbreviated portraits and final scenes of burgeoning activism, “Homeroom” suggest that kids may not be alright, but they are very much on the case."

== See also ==
- Waiting for "Superman"
- Oakland High School
- Oakland Unified School District
- Education in the United States
- Impact of the COVID-19 pandemic on education
