= Peter Nicks =

American filmmaker

Peter Olivera Nicks (born May 2, 1968) is an American film director, producer, cinematographer and writer, known for his Oakland Trilogy of documentary films, including The Waiting Room (2012), The Force (2017), and Homeroom (2021). He is a co-founder of Proximity Media alongside Ryan Coogler, Zinzi Coogler, Sev Ohanian, Ludwig Göransson, and Archie Davis, is the founder of Open'hood, Inc., a Bay Area nonprofit producing independent documentaries, and serves on the board of trustees at the Sundance Institute.

== Career ==
Nicks began his career in television and served as Producer on the “Heavy Lifting” segment of the PBS show “Life 360” - “Bridges” episode in 2001. He was co-producer and editor of the 2006 episode "Blame Somebody Else" of PBS series AIR: America's Investigative Reports. The episode received an Emmy Award in 2007 for Outstanding Feature Story in a News Magazine, for its exposure of the pipeline of illegal labor human trafficking during the Iraq War. In 2009 he founded Open'hood Inc., a Bay Area nonprofit that produces independent documentaries.

He directed the 2012 documentary film The Waiting Room, which was shortlisted for the Academy Award for Best Documentary Feature. It also won the Truer Than Fiction Award at the Independent Spirit Awards, where it was also nominated for Best Documentary.. The film follows the life and times of patients, doctors, and staff at Highland Hospital, a safety-net hospital in Oakland, California.

In 2015, Nicks received a United States Artists (USA) fellowship.

In 2017, he released The Force, a documentary about reform measures at the Oakland Police Department. The film won the Directing Prize at the Sundance Film Festival.

In January 2021, the third in his planned trilogy about Oakland public institutions, Homeroom (2021 film), received its world premiere at the online Sundance Film Festival. The film is a documentary following the Oakland High School class of 2020 through their senior year. The 2019-2020 year started normally, with students focusing on education as well as activism for social justice. But it took an unexpected turn when the COVID-19 pandemic forced the students into isolation, with virtual classes and no graduation ceremony. The film received the inaugural Jonathan Oppenheim Editing Award at the Sundance Film Festival.

In 2021, Nicks co-founded Proximity Media as Head of Nonfiction alongside Ryan Coogler, Zinzi Coogler, Sev Ohanian, Ludwig Göransson, and Archie Davis.

Nicks next directed Stephen Curry: Underrated, which premiered at the 2023 Sundance Film Festival. Also in 2023, Nicks directed Anthem, which premiered at the Tribeca Film Festival. Produced by Ryan Coogler and Kris Bowers, the film follows composer Kris Bowers and producer Dahi as they travel across the United States to create a new anthem. He also joined the Sundance Institute's board of trustees the same year.

In 2025, Nicks served as an executive producer on Hurricane Katrina: Race Against Time directed by Traci A. Curry, for National Geographic.
