= The X-Files (upcoming TV series) =

Upcoming television series

- Based on: The X-Files by Chris Carter
- Developed by: Ryan Coogler
- Showrunner: Jennifer Yale
- Starring: Danielle Deadwyler; Himesh Patel
- Composer: Ludwig Göransson
- Country of origin: United States
- Original language: English

Production
- Executive producers: Jennifer Yale; Chris Carter; Ryan Coogler; Sev Ohanian; Zinzi Coogler
- Production companies: Proximity Media; 20th Television; Onyx Collective

Original release
- Network: Hulu

The X-Files is an upcoming American science fiction drama television series developed by Ryan Coogler. It is a reboot of the original series created by Chris Carter that ran from 1993 to 2018 on Fox. Jennifer Yale serves as showrunner, with Danielle Deadwyler and Himesh Patel starring.

== Cast ==
=== Main ===
- Danielle Deadwyler
- Himesh Patel

=== Guest ===
- Amy Madigan
- Steve Buscemi
- Ben Foster
- Devery Jacobs
- Lochlyn Munro
- Tantoo Cardinal
- Joel Montgrand
- Sofia Grace Clifton

== Production ==
=== Development ===
In March 2023, The X-Files creator Chris Carter told Gloria Macarenko on CBC Radio One that Ryan Coogler was developing a reboot of the series with a diverse cast. Carter was not directly involved, but he was excited by Coogler's ideas and supportive of the effort knowing that it was a difficult job, especially with recent societal changes where "Everything's a conspiracy". Gillian Anderson was also interested in how Coogler would approach the series claiming that she never believed The X-Files would be redone, but with his approach, it felt possible and something she would consider making an appearance in. Coogler confirmed that he had spoken to Anderson about the series and potentially working with her, going on to say that developing the series in more depth would be his next project following his Warner Bros. Pictures film Sinners (2025).

In February 2026, Hulu had given the series a pilot order. Jennifer Yale was hired as showrunner and executive producer alongside Coogler. Carter also has an executive producer credit, though he had no involvement in the project beyond giving his approval. Additional executive producers include Zinzi Coogler and Sev Ohanian. 20th Television will produce the series alongside Onyx Collective and Coogler's Proximity Media; Coogler had signed a deal in 2021 with The Walt Disney Company to produce series for the company through Proximity Media. Danielle Deadwyler was also cast in the series as its lead. In March 2026, Himesh Patel joined the cast. In May 2026, several guest actors were announced, including Amy Madigan, Steve Buscemi, and Ben Foster.

On October 13, 2026, a series order was greenlit by Hulu.

=== Writing ===
Writing for the series began by October 2025, with Coogler writing the pilot episode. Coogler said he intended to preserve the original show's formula of combining monster of the week episodes with an overarching story arc.

=== Filming ===
Filming for the pilot began in May 2026, in Vancouver, Canada, under the working title Alphabet Soup, with Coogler directing; Vancouver was where filming for the first five seasons of The X-Files, as well as for its 2016 revival and the feature films The X-Files (1998) and The X-Files: I Want To Believe (2008), took place. Filming of the pilot concluded by June 2026.

=== Music ===
Proximity Media co-founder and recurring Coogler composer Ludwig Göransson composed the score for the pilot.
