= Proximity Media =

American film and television production company

- Logo used since 2023
- Type: Private
- Industry: Film; Television
- Founded: 2018; 8 years ago
- Founders: Ryan Coogler; Zinzi Coogler; Sev Ohanian
- Headquarters: Los Angeles, California, United States
- Key people: Tendo Nagenda (President; effective November 30, 2026)
- Website: proximitymedia.com

Proximity Media is an American production company founded by Ryan Coogler, Zinzi Coogler, and Sev Ohanian in 2018.

== History ==
Proximity Media is an American production company founded by Ryan Coogler, Zinzi Coogler, and Sev Ohanian in 2018. In February 2021, the company signed a five-year exclusive overall deal with The Walt Disney Company for television production, which includes developing a Black Panther spinoff series set in Wakanda for Disney+.

For feature films, the company has partnered with different major studios on a project-by-project basis, and has recently established a strong working relationship with Warner Bros. Pictures. In 2026, the company struck a TV overall deal with Netflix.

In November 2026, the company tapped Tendo Nagenda as its new president, as he will oversee all aspects of creative development and production across the company's film, television and nonfiction divisions.

== Production library ==
=== Film ===
Release date	Title	Director	Distributor	References
February 12, 2021	Judas and the Black Messiah	Shaka King	Warner Bros. Pictures	
July 16, 2021	Space Jam: A New Legacy	Malcolm D. Lee	Warner Bros. Pictures	
August 12, 2021	Homeroom	Peter Nicks	Hulu	
March 3, 2023	Creed III	Michael B. Jordan	Metro-Goldwyn-Mayer Pictures	
June 28, 2023	Anthem	Peter Nicks	Hulu	
July 21, 2023	Stephen Curry: Underrated	Peter Nicks	A24; Apple TV+	
April 18, 2025	Sinners	Ryan Coogler	Warner Bros. Pictures	

=== Television series ===
Release date	Title	References
2023	Voices Rising: The Music of Wakanda Forever	
2025	Ironheart	
2025	Hurricane Katrina: Race Against Time	
2025	Eyes of Wakanda	
TBA	The X-Files	
