= Tendo Nagenda =

American film executive, producer (born 1975)

Tendo Nagenda (born 1975) is an American film producer and former studio executive, described as "one of the most high-profile black film executives."

== Life and career ==
Tendo Nagenda was born in 1975, in Los Angeles to a Ugandan father and a Belizean mother. Nagenda graduated from Claremont McKenna College in 1997 with a double major in accounting and government. He worked at Deloitte for a year and a half before spending four months at the New York Film Academy.

Nagenda held positions at HBO, Good Universe, Warner Independent Pictures, and Plan B Entertainment before an eight-year stint at Disney. At Disney, he became executive vice president of production and oversaw the production of Queen of Katwe, Cinderella, Beauty and the Beast, A Wrinkle in Time, Dumbo, and Mulan.

In 2018, Nagenda was hired by Netflix to serve as Vice President of Original Films as part of Netflix’s move towards self-produced as well as diverse content. During this time he oversaw Da 5 Bloods, Ma Rainey’s Black Bottom, Hillbilly Elegy, The Harder They Fall, The Gray Man, and Glass Onion: A Knives Out Mystery. His unit handled roughly twenty films of budgets of around $25 million.

He was associated with the work of Ava DuVernay, David Oyelowo, and Ryan Coogler throughout his tenure at both Disney and Netflix.

In 2026, Nagenda was named as its new president of Proximity Media, as he will assume the role on November 30, 2026.
