= Eyes of Wakanda =

2025 Marvel Studios animated miniseries

- Genre: Action-adventure; Anthology; Science fiction; Superhero
- Created by: Todd Harris
- Based on: Marvel Comics
- Developed by: Ryan Coogler
- Showrunner: Todd Harris
- Starring: Winnie Harlow; Cress Williams; Larry Herron; Adam Gold; Jacques Colimon; Jona Xiao; Zeke Alton; Steve Toussaint
- Music by: Hesham Nazih
- Country of origin: United States
- Original language: English
- No. of seasons: 1
- No. of episodes: 4

Production
- Executive producers: Dana Vasquez-Eberhardt; Todd Harris; Zinzi Coogler; Sev Ohanian; Kalia King; Ryan Coogler; Louis D'Esposito; Kevin Feige; Brad Winderbaum
- Producers: Danielle Costa; Patty Jausoro
- Editor: John K. Carr
- Running time: 30–32 minutes
- Production companies: Marvel Studios Animation; Proximity Media

Original release
- Network: Disney+
- Release: August 1, 2025

Related
- Marvel Cinematic Universe television series

Eyes of Wakanda is an American animated anthology television miniseries created by Todd Harris for the streaming service Disney+, based on the Marvel Comics country Wakanda. It is the 15th television series in the Marvel Cinematic Universe (MCU) from Marvel Studios and is produced by Marvel Studios Animation with Proximity Media, sharing continuity with the films of the franchise. It follows the Hatut Zaraze, Wakandan warriors who carry out dangerous missions throughout history. Harris served as showrunner and director.

The series stars Winnie Harlow, Cress Williams, Larry Herron, Adam Gold, Jacques Colimon, Jona Xiao, Zeke Alton, and Steve Toussaint. In February 2021, an overall deal between Disney and Ryan Coogler's Proximity Media was announced. An animated series about Wakanda was in development by March 2023, and was officially announced as Eyes of Wakanda that December. Harris's involvement was revealed in March 2024. Unlike Marvel Animation's other series to that point, Eyes of Wakanda is set in the MCU's "Sacred Timeline" and has greater connections with the franchise's films. Animation for the series is provided by Axis Animation in a hand-painted style inspired by contemporary African-American artists such as Ernie Barnes, as well as illustrator Dean Cornwell.

Eyes of Wakanda premiered on Disney+ on August 1, 2025, with all four episodes released simultaneously. It is the first series of Phase Six of the MCU.

== Premise ==
The Hatut Zaraze, Wakandan warriors, carry out dangerous missions around the world to retrieve vibranium artifacts throughout history.

== Cast and characters ==
=== Main ===
- Winnie Harlow as Noni:
  A disgraced former member of the Dora Milaje, Wakanda's all-female special forces, who goes on a special mission to Minoan Crete in 1260 BC. Lynn Whitfield voices an older Noni.
- Cress Williams as Nkati / The Lion:
  A former Wakandan general turned warlord and pirate. By 1260 BC, he has managed to use the advanced technology he stole from the country to found his own tyrannical kingdom.
- Larry Herron as B'Kai / Memnon: A Hatut Zaraze operative serving undercover in Troy in 1200 BC
- Adam Gold as Achilles: The Greek hero of the Trojan War and commander of the Myrmidons
- Jacques Colimon as Basha: A member of the Hatut Zaraze who travels to China in 1400 AD to recover a Wakandan artifact
- Jona Xiao as Jorani / Iron Fist:
  A masked martial artist from K'un-Lun in 1400 AD with the ability to call upon the mystical power of the Iron Fist. She draws this power from the molten heart of the immortal dragon Shou-Lao, whom she defeated.
- Zeke Alton as Tafari: A Wakandan prince and Hatut Zaraze operative in 1896 AD
- Steve Toussaint as Kuda:
  A member of the Hatut Zaraze who oversees Tafari's first mission in the field. Showrunner Todd Harris called the character "authoritative" with "heart and soul" whose strong devotion to the cause leads to his principles sometimes outweighing his duty.

=== Guests ===
- Patricia Belcher as Akeya: The eldest leader of the Dora Milaje and Noni's superior
- Jason Konopisos as Ferro: A Myrmidon soldier who doubts Memnon's allegiance to Achilles
- Kiff VandenHeuvel as Odysseus: The Greek king of Ithaca during the Trojan War
- Yerman Gur as Paris: The prince of Troy during the Trojan War
- Joanna Kalafatis as Helen of Troy: Paris's wife who possesses a Wakandan artifact
- Isaac Robinson-Smith as Ebo: The captain of the Hatut Zaraze who oversees Basha's mission
- Gary Anthony Williams as Rakim: The great counselor of the Hatut Zaraze and Basha and Ebo's superior
- Anika Noni Rose as Black Panther: A time-traveling queen of Wakanda from 500 years into the future
- Debra Wilson as a Dora Milaje general who serves the Black Panther of the future

Additionally, the characters Uatu / Watcher and N'Jadaka / Erik "Killmonger" Stevens make non-speaking cameo appearances in the series.

== Episodes ==
No.	Title	Directed by	Written by	Original release date
1	"Into the Lion's Den"	Todd Harris	Geoffrey Thorne	August 1, 2025
In 1260 BC, the former Dora Milaje Noni is tasked by her mentor Akeya with a mission to hunt down and capture a rogue Hatut Zaraze agent named Nkati, who has defied all previous efforts to apprehend him. Akeya fears that Nkati will share Wakandan technology, exposing the kingdom. Calling himself the Lion, Nkati plans to create the "Pride of the Lion", an independent state populated by abducted men and women from across the world. Noni allows herself to be captured during a raid on Minoan Crete. After hijacking a ship and freeing the other captives, Noni infiltrates Nkati's deep-sea complex. After surviving attacks from several trained warriors, Noni confronts and subsequently defeats him in a duel. The mortally wounded Nkati triggers a self-destruct device which destroys the entire complex. Noni survives the explosion and Akeya invites her to rejoin the Dora Milaje. The fiercely independent Noni instead chooses to join the Hatut Zaraze. Cast: Winnie Harlow as Noni, Cress Williams as Nkati / The Lion, and Patricia Belcher as Akeya
2	"Legends and Lies"	John Fang	Marc Bernardin	August 1, 2025
During the Trojan War in 1200 BC, B'Kai has infiltrated the Greek army under the alias of Memnon and fights alongside Achilles in their battle against the Trojans. Memnon's allegiance is questioned by Ferro but Achilles defends him. Odysseus pitches his idea of the Trojan Horse. The Horse is built and given to the Trojans. Later that night, Memnon, Achilles, and their soldiers emerge from the Trojan Horse and silently take out the guards while letting in the rest of the Greek army. One guard sounds the alarm before he is killed alerting the Trojans to the infiltrators. Memnon diverts from the battle but Achilles sees him deserting. Memnon confronts a fleeing Paris and Helen of Troy where he persuades them to give up Helen’s necklace. Achilles catches up to see Memnon letting Paris and Helen flee. After understanding the power inside the necklace, Achilles questions about the necklace, but Memnon does not give information on the necklace. Assuming that Memnon is a traitor, Achilles and Memnon fight but Memnon wounds Achilles in the heel and regretfully stabs him. Having returned the artifact home, B'Kai speaks to an older Noni, who tells him not to feel guilt for his actions because Wakanda will only survive by concealing itself from outsiders. B'Kai, in turn, tells Noni that he feels like a stranger in Wakanda after spending nine years undercover and asks to be sent on another mission immediately. Cast: Larry Herron as B'Kai / Memnon, Adam Gold as Achilles, Lynn Whitfield as Noni, Jason Konopisos as Ferro, Kiff VandenHeuvel as Odysseus, Yerman Gur as Paris, and Joanna Kalafatis as Helen of Troy
3	"Lost and Found"	John Fang and Todd Harris	Marc Bernardin	August 1, 2025
In 1400 AD, Wakandan field agent Basha has infiltrated K'un-Lun to retrieve a piece of vibranium held inside a small dragon statue. The vibranium can't be removed, so Basha takes the statue's head and flies back to Wakanda. Upon his return, Basha debriefs with his field leader Ebo and Councilman Rakim. In the hangar, a mysterious intruder emerges from Basha's ship. The intruder then encounters Ebo and asks for Basha. He tricks the intruder into a cafeteria filled with Hatut Zaraze, but the intruder fights them off and escapes. Basha encounters the intruder, who is revealed to be Jorani, the woman who found him in the snow outside of K'un-Lun and nursed him back to health. In the artifact room, Basha explains that the artifact was stolen from Wakanda, but Jorani chastises him for betraying her trust. With her Iron Fist powers, she easily removes the vibranium from the statue. Hiding Jorani in a room, Basha and Ebo cover up the incident to Rakim's satisfaction, and he promotes Ebo. Then they sneak Jorani back to the hangar so that she can return to K'un-Lun with the statue's head. Cast: Jacques Colimon as Basha, Jona Xiao as Jorani / Iron Fist, Isaac Robinson-Smith as Ebo, and Gary Anthony Williams as Rakim
4	"The Last Panther"	Todd Harris	Geoffrey Thorne	August 1, 2025
In 1896 AD, Kuda mentors Prince Tafari on his first mission to retrieve a vibranium axe from Adwa during a battle; Tafari retrieves the axe. On their way back to Wakanda, an armoured person suddenly appears, causes their transport to crash and fights them. Kuda and Tafari get the better of the adversary, but she reveals herself to be the queen of Wakanda and the last Black Panther from 500 years in the future. The Black Panther shows them a vision of Wakanda in ruins, destroyed by aliens known as the Horde due to Wakanda's isolationist policy, which stopped them from uniting with other nations to fight against the Horde. The Black Panther sent herself back in time to find a way of stopping the Horde and found that the axe helps a future king of Wakanda to see the wider world as potential allies if the axe is left where it was found. To prove that the Black Panther is from the future, she reveals that the present queen is pregnant. The last Panther is pulled back into the future. Tafari confirms to Kuda about the current queen's pregnancy as they return to Adwa to put the axe back where it was found, though Kuda is injured in the process. After Tafari covers up what happened when speaking to the royal family, Tafari and Kuda hope the failure of their original mission was worthy to save the future. Years later, Erik "Killmonger" Stevens prepares to steal the axe which is now on display in a London museum. (Note: As depicted in the film Black Panther (2018).) Cast: Zeke Alton as Tafari, Steve Toussaint as Kuda, Anika Noni Rose as Black Panther, and Debra Wilson as a Dora Milaje general

== Production ==
=== Development ===
In February 2021, Ryan Coogler—writer and director of the Marvel Studios films Black Panther (2018) and Black Panther: Wakanda Forever (2022)—announced a five-year television deal between his company Proximity Media and The Walt Disney Company. The deal included the development of a drama series for the streaming service Disney+ based on the fictional country of Wakanda, the setting of the Black Panther films. Coogler was developing the series with Marvel Studios' Kevin Feige, Louis D'Esposito, and Victoria Alonso. Richard Newby at The Hollywood Reporter said the series could expand the mythos of Wakanda while also paying tribute to Chadwick Boseman, who portrayed T'Challa / Black Panther in the Marvel Cinematic Universe (MCU) until his death in August 2020. Newby suggested that the series could further explore the character M'Baku and the Jabari Tribe; N'Jadaka / Erik "Killmonger" Stevens's mercenary past; T'Challa's father T'Chaka and his time as Black Panther; or the Dora Milaje, Wakanda's all-female special forces. Newby also noted several comic book characters that the series could introduce to the MCU: Bashenga, the first Black Panther; teenage activist Queen Divine Justice who joins the Dora Milaje; or NYPD officer Kasper Cole / White Tiger, who also takes on the mantle of Black Panther.

Proximity Media was developing several series set in Wakanda by November 2022. In March 2023, journalist Jeff Sneider reported that Coogler and Disney were developing an animated series with the tentative title The Golden City, referring to the Wakandan capital city Birnin Zana; a production listing gave Golden City as the working title for the initial Wakanda-set drama series. The following month, Marvel Studios executive Nate Moore said they had discussed multiple ideas for featuring Black Panther characters in Disney+ series but they were wary about detracting from the "cinematic experience" of the franchise. In December, Marvel Studios Animation head Brad Winderbaum officially announced the animated series Eyes of Wakanda as part of a sizzle reel of the studio's upcoming series. It was revealed to focus on the stories of different Wakandan warriors throughout history. Coogler and Proximity Media were confirmed to be involved, and a showrunner was working on the series by then. Commentators discussed whether it was the same as a previously reported series focused on the Dora Milaje character Okoye. Stephanie Holland at The Root compared the series' premise to the animated Star Wars series Tales of the Jedi (2022), which similarly follows different characters at different times.

Former Marvel Studios storyboard artist Todd Harris was revealed in January 2024 to have pitched the series to Marvel and Coogler. He originally conceived the story while doing storyboard work for the MCU film Avengers: Infinity War (2018) and was introduced to Coogler, who was in production on Black Panther at the time. Harris looked to combine "the interconnectivity of Marvel with the interconnectivity of history along with the interconnectivity of the human story" in the series, and hoped to have it release as an "accompanying piece" to Black Panther given Marvel Studios had yet to form its animation studio. Once Marvel Studios Animation was formed, they approached Harris about proceeding with the idea. Later in 2024, Winderbaum said Harris created and directed the series, and he was confirmed to be the showrunner in January 2025. Harris described Eyes of Wakanda as "anthology adjacent" given each short story in each time period form a larger, continuous narrative. Harris was also an executive producer alongside Coogler, Winderbaum, Feige, D'Esposito, Zinzi Coogler, Sev Ohanian, Kalia King, and Dana Vasquez-Eberhardt. Marvel Studios reportedly spent nearly $20 million between June 2022 and June 2023 on an animated series that was believed to be Eyes of Wakanda. Each episode is 30 minutes.

=== Writing ===
Geoffrey Thorne, who worked as a writer on the animated series Ultimate Spider-Man (2012–2017) and served as showrunner on the fifth season of the animated series Avengers Assemble (2013–2019), was the first writer to join the project. Marc Bernardin, who worked as a writer on the video game Marvel 1943: Rise of Hydra (2027), wrote two episodes by December 2023. He worked on them for nine months during the COVID-19 pandemic. Matthew Chauncey also wrote for the series after doing so for the Marvel Studios series What If...? (2021–2024) and Ms. Marvel (2022).

Eyes of Wakanda follows the Hatut Zaraze, Wakandan warriors who travel the world throughout history to retrieve dangerous vibranium artifacts. It is centered on the legacy of the Black Panther as that mantle is passed down over generations, and on the idea that Wakanda is "untethered by expansion" and hidden from the rest of the world. Harris said the Hatut Zaraze were "Wakanda's CIA" whose loyalty is tested on their missions, calling the series a "giant spy-espionage" that spans time. Eyes of Wakanda is set in several past time periods, with its respective episodes taking place in 1260 BC Crete during the Bronze Age, 1200 BC during the Trojan War, 1400 AD China at the start of the Ming dynasty, and 1896 AD Ethiopia during the First Italo-Ethiopian War. Coogler was drawn to the Sea Peoples, a group who existed around 1200 BC and "raided everybody", which allowed Harris and the writers to form the premise of imagining if they had been led by Wakandans with their technology and tactics and "what kind of disruptive force would they be in this era".

The series is set in the MCU's "Sacred Timeline" along with the films and live-action series, differentiating it from Marvel Animation's earlier series such as What If...? and Your Friendly Neighborhood Spider-Man (2025–present), which are set in alternate universes from the main MCU. The creative team worked back from the "existing framework" of the films when developing the series' stories. Eyes of Wakanda focuses more on Wakandan principles rather than a distant relative of a known Wakandan character in the present.

=== Casting and voice recording ===
Winnie Harlow, Cress Williams, Patricia Belcher, Larry Herron, Adam Gold, Lynn Whitfield, Jacques Colimon, Jona Xiao, Isaac Robinson-Smith, Gary Anthony Williams, Zeke Alton, Steve Toussaint, and Anika Noni Rose were revealed to have been cast in the series in November 2024. Cress voices a character called Nkati / The Lion. In May 2025, Harlow was revealed to be voicing a character named Noni, while Harris said Rose played a "crucial role" in the series. At the end of July, Xiao revealed she was voicing an incarnation of Iron Fist, later identified as the original MCU character Jorani.

=== Animation and design ===
Animation for the series is provided by Axis Animation, with Studio AKA animating a hand-drawn opening sequence. It is presented in a widescreen aspect ratio. Eyes of Wakanda features a hand-painted animation style inspired by contemporary African-American artists such as Ernie Barnes, as well as illustrator Dean Cornwell; Barnes' style served as inspiration for the characters' exaggerated proportions in the series. The animators also looked at contemporary international art starring in the present and working backwards to find common themes that could translate to Wakandan influence throughout history. Craig Ellliot, head of the art department, worked with artists around the world, including from Nigeria, South Africa, and Egypt. Work on character designs and animatics occurred by the series' announcement in December 2023. Harris said the ambitious series could only be made with animation due to the locations and time periods depicted, explaining that in animation "Egypt costs just as much as New York City, and the Moon costs just as much as Ohio".

=== Music ===
Hesham Nazih composed the score for the series, after previously working on the Marvel Studios series Moon Knight (2022). The soundtrack was released on August 8, 2025.

Eyes of Wakanda [Original Soundtrack]
No.	Title	Length
1.	"Eyes of Wakanda Main Title"	1:17
2.	"Eyes of Wakanda Main on Ends"	1:17
3.	"Raiders"	2:29
4.	"Not a Time for Gaming"	2:40
5.	"Liberation Part One"	3:46
6.	"Liberation Part Two"	3:32
7.	"Threat Remains"	2:36
8.	"Troy Battle"	3:13
9.	"Fireside Chat"	4:37
10.	"This Ends Tonight"	4:10
11.	"Himalayas"	2:38
12.	"It's Good to Be Home"	0:46
13.	"The Mission Is What Matters Part One"	1:03
14.	"The Mission Is What Matters Part Two"	0:51
15.	"The Mission Is What Matters Part Three"	3:06
16.	"The Mission Is What Matters Part Four"	2:07
17.	"You Were Never My Mission Part One"	1:39
18.	"You Were Never My Mission Part Two"	2:16
19.	"You Were Never My Mission Part Three"	0:58
20.	"Greatest Heroes"	3:32
21.	"Lectures"	3:38
22.	"Not Your Enemy"	4:51
23.	"Forgotten Son Part One"	1:20
24.	"Forgotten Son Part Two"	7:38
Total length:		1:01:02

== Marketing ==
Eyes of Wakanda was promoted by Coogler and Harris during Marvel Studios Animation's panel at the D23 convention in August 2024, where some footage was shown. Footage from the series was included in a video that was released by Disney+ in October, announcing the release schedule for Marvel Television and Marvel Animation projects through the end of 2025. More footage was included in a sizzle reel that was shown at Disney's upfront presentation in May 2025.

== Release ==
Eyes of Wakanda premiered on Disney+ on August 1, 2025, with all four episodes. It was previously set for release in 2024, and was scheduled for August 6 and then August 27 before the August 1 date was set. The first episode was screened at the Annecy International Animation Film Festival on June 9. Eyes of Wakanda is the first series of Phase Six of the MCU.

== Reception ==
=== Viewership ===
Whip Media, which tracks viewership data for the more than 25 million worldwide users of its TV Time app, announced that Eyes of Wakanda was the third most-anticipated new television series of August 2025. Streaming analytics firm FlixPatrol, which monitors daily updated VOD charts and streaming ratings across the globe, reported that as of August 4, the series ranked as the number one show on Disney+ across all available markets following the debut of all four episodes. In the United States, as of August 5, Eyes of Wakanda ranked third overall on the platform's combined chart of films and series. During the week beginning August 6, Eyes of Wakanda was the most-streamed series on Disney+, outperforming other popular titles such as Grey's Anatomy and Modern Family. TVision, which tracks viewer attention, program reach, and engagement across more than 1,000 CTV apps, reported that it was the eighteenth most-streamed series between August 4–10.

=== Critical response ===
The review aggregator website Rotten Tomatoes reports a 91% approval rating based on 34 reviews. The website's critics consensus reads, "Fleshing out the iconic MCU kingdom with concise stories and an attractive visual texture, Eyes of Wakanda is an accomplished animated addition to Black Panther lore." Metacritic, which uses a weighted average, assigned a score of 72 out of 100 based on 10 critics, indicating "generally favorable."

Charles Pulliam-Moore of The Verge said that Eyes of Wakanda successfully blends Marvel fantasy with grounded storytelling rooted in Wakandan history. He noted that the series explores nuanced questions of justice, morality, and the ethics of Wakanda's secrecy. Pulliam-Moore praised the visuals, engaging use of African-inspired historical moments, and the balance of brutality and whimsy. He also highlighted showrunner Todd Harris for creating morally complex characters and coherent, captivating stories that distinguish the series among recent Disney+ animated anthologies, delivering Marvel entertainment that is both thoughtful and exciting. Dennis Perkins of The A.V. Club gave Eyes of Wakanda a grade of "B", describing it as a thought-provoking and entertaining animated series. He praised the animation for giving the characters distinct physicality and enhancing both action and storytelling. Perkins appreciated the exploration of loyalty, freedom, and cultural morality through characters such as Noni and Memnon. He also complimented the show for its imaginative fight scenes, nuanced portrayal of Wakanda's ethical dilemmas, and its ability to provide meaningful world-building within the MCU while remaining visually vibrant and engaging.

=== Accolades ===
Accolades received by Eyes of Wakanda
Award	Date of ceremony	Category	Recipient	Result	Ref.
Annie Awards	February 21, 2026	Best Limited Series	"Into the Lion's Den"	Nominated	
NAACP Image Awards	February 28, 2026	Outstanding Children's Program	Eyes of Wakanda	Nominated	
NAACP Image Awards	February 28, 2026	Outstanding Original Score for TV/Film	Eyes of Wakanda Original Soundtrack	Nominated	
Primetime Creative Arts Emmy Awards	September 5–6, 2026	Outstanding Individual Achievement in Animation	Uzoma Dunkwu (character design) (for "Into the Lion's Den")	Won	
