= Oakland High School (Oakland, California) =

Public high school in California, United States

Coordinates: 37°48′17.58″N 122°14′10.43″W

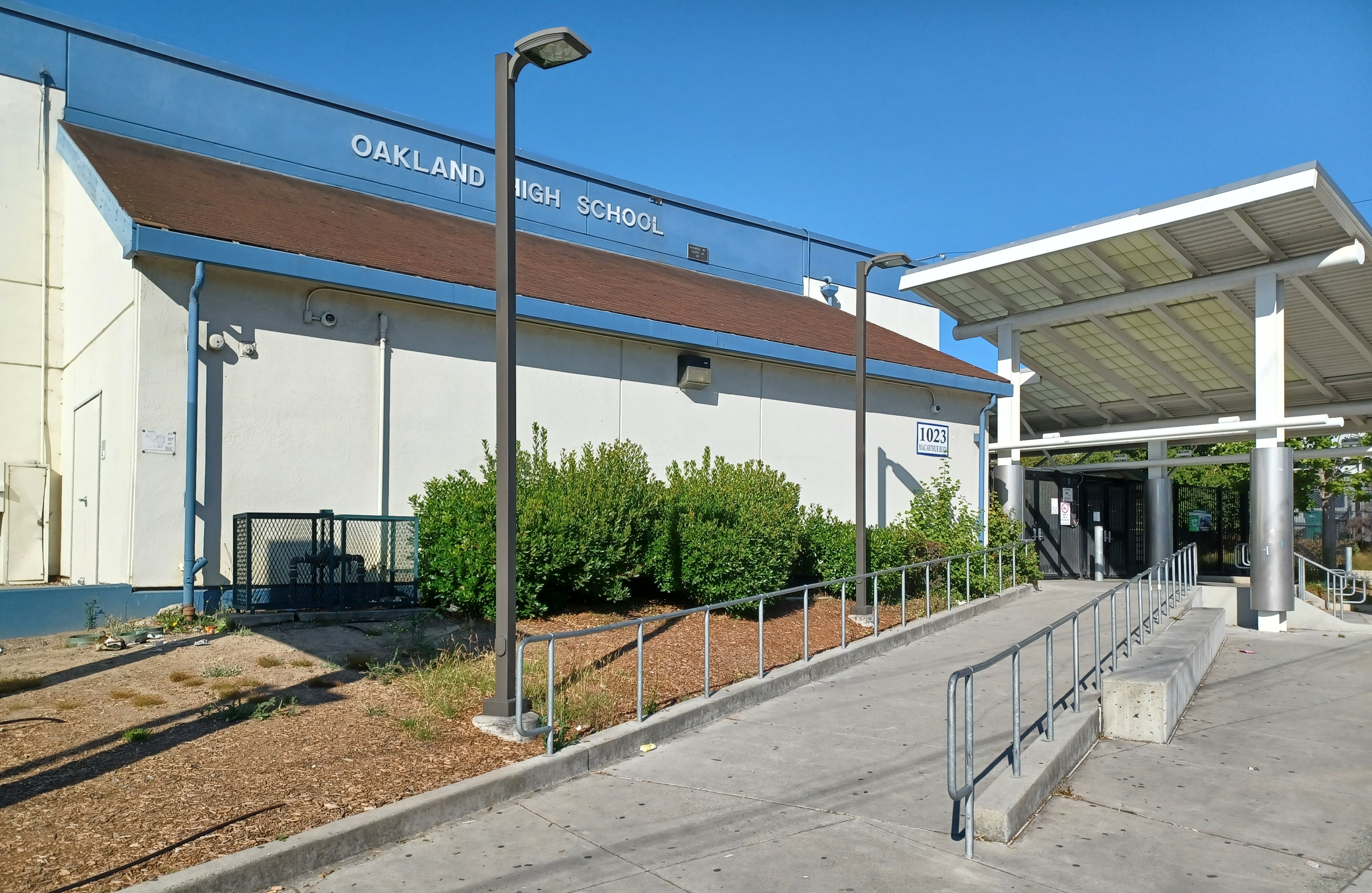

Location
- 1023 MacArthur Boulevard; Oakland, California 94610; United States

Information
- Type: Public magnet high school
- Motto: "In Virtute Summum Bonum Ponamus" (In virtue we place the highest good.)
- Established: 1869
- School district: Oakland Unified School District
- Principal: Pamela Moy
- Teaching staff: 84.41 (FTE)
- Grades: 9-12
- Enrollment: 1,579 (2025-2026)
- Student to teacher ratio: 18.07
- Colors: Blue and white
- Athletics conference: CIF Oakland Section
- Nickname: Wildcats
- Newspaper: The Aegis
- Yearbook: The Oaken Bucket
- Website: oaklandhigh.ousd.org

Oakland Senior High School (also known as O-High or OHS) is a public high school in Oakland, California. Established in 1869, it is the oldest high school in Oakland and the sixth oldest high school in the state.

== History ==
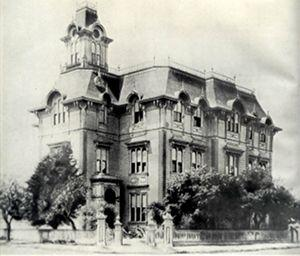
Oakland High School, 1872-1895

Oakland High was first located at 12th Street and Market Street, then at 12th and Jefferson Street. It has been at its current location at the corner of MacArthur Boulevard and Park Boulevard since 1928. The building that stood before its current manifestation was known as the "Pink Prison" or "Pink Palace." The stairway leading up from Park Boulevard is what remains of the exterior. The lamps in the commons are original fixtures. What is now the football field and basketball courts was once classrooms and a huge theater. The school colors are royal blue and white, and the mascot is Willy the Wildcat.

The building was torn down in 1980 to be rebuilt as a safer structure in the event of a major earthquake.

A new football/soccer/baseball field was inaugurated in the spring of 2006. The football field is officially known as the "Jackie Jensen Field", while the baseball/softball field is dedicated to a, longtime coach and teacher.

Pamela Moy became Oakland High's principal in fall 2020, succeeding Matin Abdel-Qawi, who was the principal serving from 2012 to 2020.

In the summer of 2008, renovations and rebuilding to the main building (as well in the former shop buildings) began and were completed in August 2011.

In January 2021, filmmaker Peter Nicks released Homeroom, a documentary following the Oakland High class of 2020 through their senior year. The 2019–2020 school year started normally but made an unexpected turn in March 2020 as a result of the COVID-19 pandemic, forcing the students into quarantine and to attend virtual classes, with no prom or graduation ceremony.

In the 2022-2023 school year, the boys varsity basketball team won its first state basketball championship.

== Academics ==
OHS offers many Advanced Placement (AP) courses, and concurrent enrollment college courses are offered from the Peralta Colleges after school.

=== Test scores ===
For 2013, the school's API score was 634 out of a possible 1,000 points.

California Standard Tests Scores, proficiency rate
English	Mathematics	Science
38%	17%	32%

=== Families and learning pathways ===
Ninth-grade students are parts of learning communities called freshman "families" named after different wildcats such as puma, tiger, panther, jaguar, or cheetah. Students in grades 10 to 12 join one of the school's Career and Technical Education (CTE), aligned pathway programs.

== Athletics ==
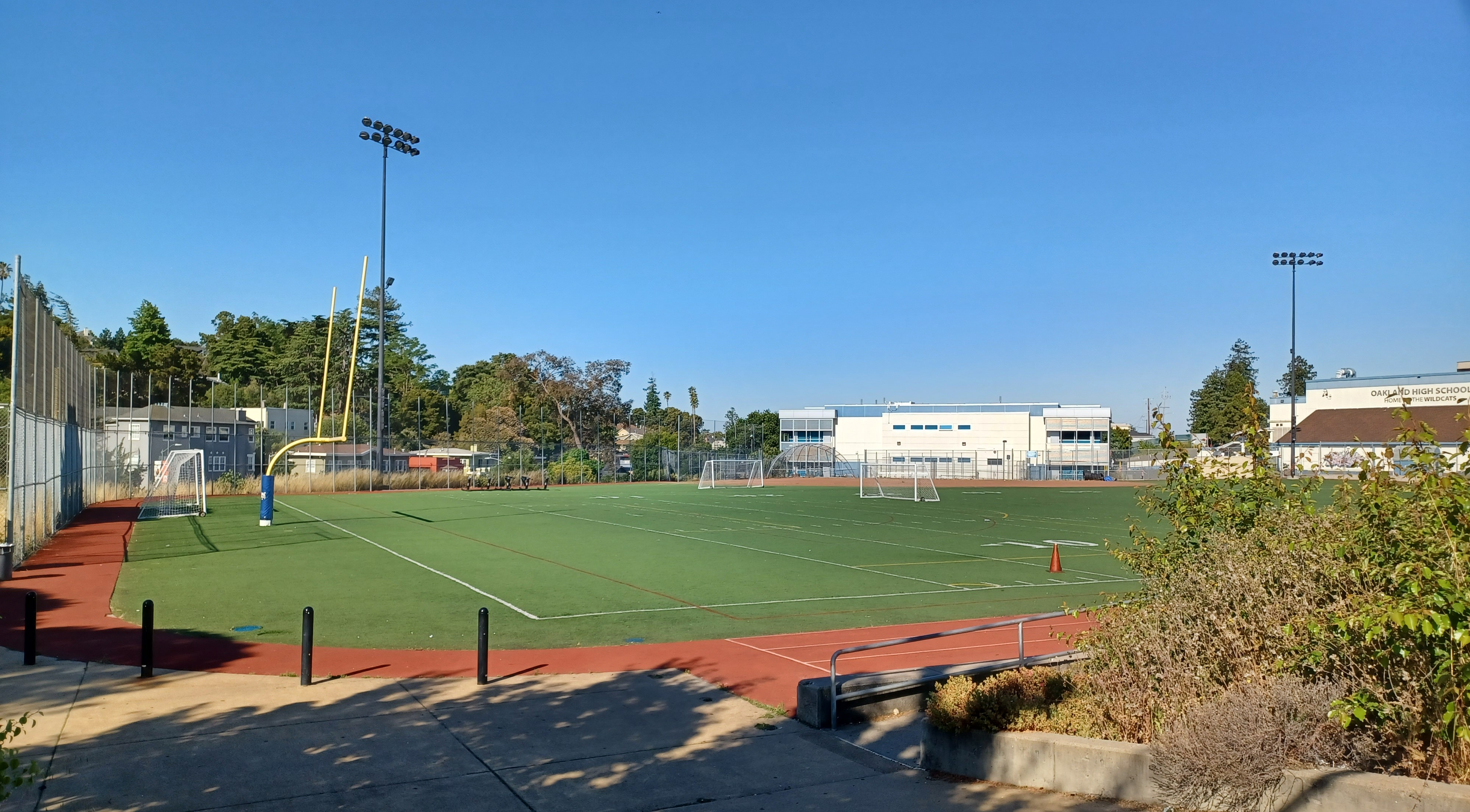
Jackie Jensen Field

In 2023, the basketball team won the Dlll State championship.

=== Sports ===
Women's:
- Badminton
- Basketball
- Bowling
- Cheerleading
- Cross Country
- Lacrosse
- Soccer
- Softball
- Swimming
- Tennis
- Track & Field
- Volleyball
- Wrestling
Men's:
- Baseball
- Basketball
- Bowling
- Cheerleading
- Cross Country
- Football
- Soccer
- Swimming
- Track & Field
- Volleyball
- Wrestling

== Student newspaper ==
The Aegis is the oldest high school newspaper in California. It was founded in 1886 at Oakland High School. The newspaper puts out occasional print issues, but mostly publishes content on its website.

In the 1890s, Jack London wrote for the publication, and these stories were later collected into a book called The Aegis.

== Notable alumni ==
- Herbert Anderson, actor, Dennis The Menace television series.
- Carroll Borland (1931), actress, author, Professor of Education
- Annie Florence Brown, President, Oakland Board of Education
- Jabari Brown (2011), Los Angeles Lakers basketball player
- Chris Burford (1955), NFL player and NCAA Football Hall of Fame
- Sway Calloway, rapper and radio personality
- David Carradine (1954), actor
- King Lan Chew (1921), dancer
- George Cooper Pardee (1875), Governor of California, 1903–1907
- Denny Dent (1966), painter
- Sheila E., percussionist
- Ralph Edwards (1930), television producer
- Ben Fong-Torres (1962), journalist
- Shirley Fong-Torres (1964), chef, tour operator, and popular travel and food writer
- Chick Gandil (1906), professional baseball player
- Paul Gemignani (1955), jazz drummer and Broadway music director
- Sylvia Gerrish (as Lillian Rollins), (1878), musical comedy actress
- Lillian Moller Gilbreth (1896), industrial engineer
- Bob Grottkau, NFL player and college coach
- Eric Hughes, NBA assistant coach
- George J. Hatfield (1907), Lieutenant Governor of California, 1935–39
- Harry W. Hill (admiral), vice admiral US Navy
- Marsha Hunt (1964), actress, singer and novelist
- Kevin Jenkins, politician
- Jackie Jensen (1945), athlete, College Football Hall of Fame, 1958 AL MVP
- Franklin Knight Lane (1880), US Secretary of Interior, 1913–1920
- Fay Lanphier (1924), Miss California, 1924 and 1925; Miss America, 1925
- Damian Lillard (2008), NBA basketball player and rapper
- Jack London (1896), writer
- Lorenzo Lynch, NFL football player
- Judah Leon Magnes (1894), rabbi, Chancellor/President Hebrew University, Jerusalem 1925-1948
- Dudley Manlove (1931), vaudeville, radio and B-movie actor
- Yōsuke Matsuoka (1896), Japanese Minister of Foreign Affairs during WWII
- Armand Mauss (1946), sociologist
- Stanley Mazor (1959), engineer
- Ken McAlister, NFL football player and college basketball player
- Edwin Meese (1949), US Attorney General, 1985–1988
- Clark Miller (1955), NFL football player
- Ethel Moore, civic leader
- Julia Morgan (1890), architect
- Lloyd Moseby (1978), Major League baseball player
- Robert Nichols, actor
- Zoe Ann Olsen-Jensen (1949), Olympic diver; silver medal, 1948; bronze medal, 1952
- Walter Plunkett (1919), 1951 Academy Award for Costume Design for An American in Paris
- Bill Rigney (1936), New York Giants player and first manager of the San Francisco Giants, 1956
- Boots Riley, rapper, producer, screenwriter, film director, and activist
- Dawn Robinson (attended), singer; founding member of R&B vocal group En Vogue.
- Gertrude Stein (1892), author
- Ellery W. Stone (1912), Rear admiral and Radio pioneer
- Nellie Wong (1952), poet

== See also ==
- List of Oakland, California high schools
