= Winnie Harlow =

Canadian fashion model (born 1994)

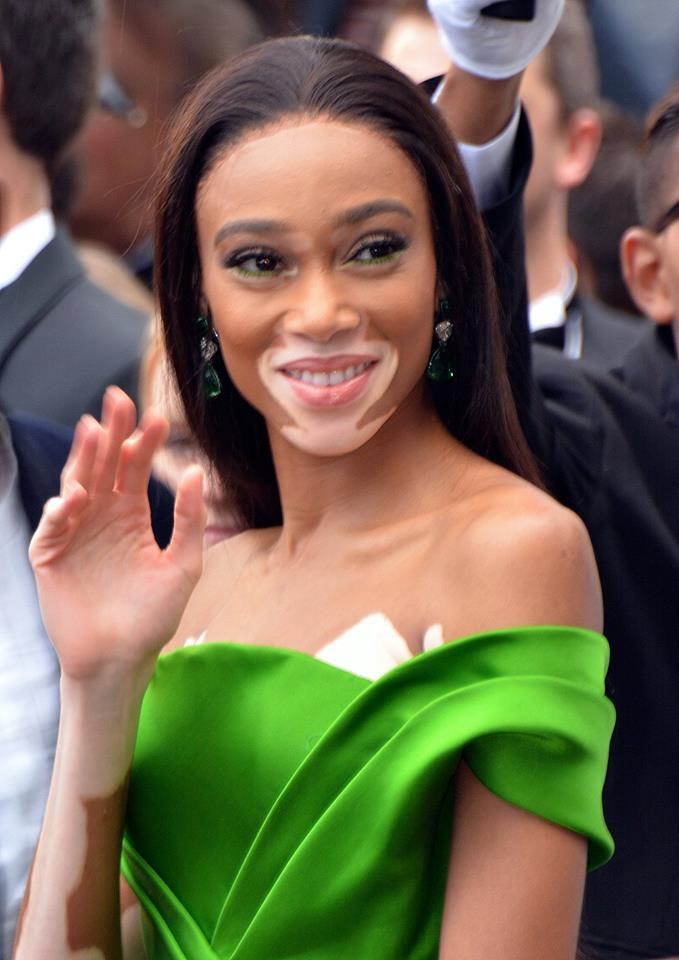
- Harlow in 2018
- Born: Chantelle Whitney Brown-Young; July 27, 1994 (age 32); Mississauga, Ontario, Canada
- Other name: Chantelle Winnie
- Occupations: Model; spokesperson; actress
- Years active: 2014–present
- Partner(s): Kyle Kuzma (2020–present; engaged)
- Modeling information
- Height: 5 ft 9 in (1.75 m)
- Hair color: Black
- Agency: CAA (Los Angeles); Women Management (Milan); The Squad (London)

Chantelle Whitney Brown-Young (born July 27, 1994), known professionally as Winnie Harlow, is a Canadian fashion model, actress and public spokesperson on the skin condition vitiligo. She gained prominence in 2014 as a contestant on the 21st cycle of the U.S. television series America's Next Top Model. Harlow later appeared in the Beyoncé-directed visual album Beyoncé: Lemonade (2016). In 2018, she became the first model with vitiligo to walk in the Victoria's Secret Fashion Show; and was honored as one of the BBC 100 Women. Harlow served as a judge on the second season of the Amazon Prime Video series Making the Cut. She voices the leading role of Noni in the Marvel Cinematic Universe animated series Eyes of Wakanda on Disney+.

== Early life ==
Winnie Harlow was born Chantelle Brown-Young on July 27, 1994, in the Greater Toronto Area, the daughter of Lisa Brown and Windsor Young. She is of Jamaican ancestry and has two sisters. She was diagnosed with the chronic skin condition vitiligo, characterized by depigmentation of portions of the skin, at the age of four.

== Career ==
=== Modelling ===
Harlow was discovered by America's Next Top Model host Tyra Banks on Instagram, and subsequently became one of the 14 contestants of the 21st cycle in 2014. She was the only Canadian ever cast on ANTM. She was eliminated in the second week of the finals, and participated in a separate competition called the "comeback series", where she continued to participate in the cycle's photo shoots along with the other eliminated contestants in an effort to return to the competition. After completing the comeback series, she was revealed to have received the highest average public vote score, and returned. She was eliminated again in episode 13, being the ninth eliminated overall.

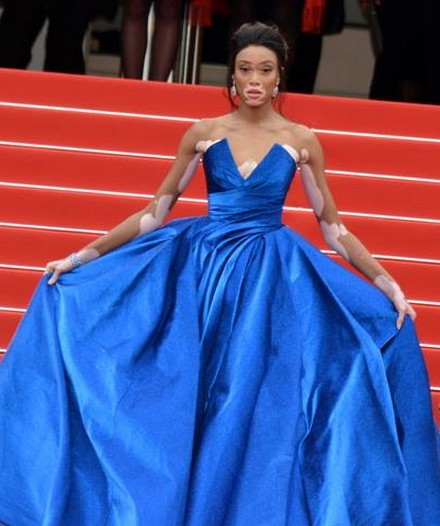
Harlow at the 2017 Cannes Film Festival

Following her elimination from America's Next Top Model, Harlow modelled for the Spanish clothing brand Desigual and became its official brand representative. In September 2014, she walked and closed for the clothing brand Ashish for its spring/summer 2015 collection in London Fashion Week. She has had for the fashion website Showstudio.com. In 2015, Harlow modelled for the Italian clothing brand Diesel for its spring/summer 2015 campaign, which was shot by British fashion photographer Nick Knight. She modelled for the Spanish and Italian editions of Glamour magazine and was featured in the August/September 2015 issue of Complex magazine. She was also featured in the August 2015 issue of Cosmopolitan. She was featured on Vogue Italia's website in an interview and accompanying photo shoot. In August 2015, Harlow shot the cover of an accompanying editorial spread in the September issue of Ebony magazine, where she appeared alongside former America's Next Top Model contestant Fatima Siad. In 2016, Harlow was featured in a commercial for Sprite, and was featured in a campaign for Swarovski. The same year, she was chosen as one of BBC's 100 Women In 2018, she modelled at the Victoria's Secret Fashion Show.

Harlow has appeared in advertising campaigns for Fendi, Marc Jacobs, Tommy Hilfiger, Desigual, Diesel, Swarovski, Steve Madden, Nike, Puma, MAC and Victoria's Secret.

=== Vitiligo public speaking ===
Harlow posted a video titled "Vitiligo: A Skin Condition, not a Life Changer" on YouTube in July 2011. She talked about the condition and answered questions about living with vitiligo. Harlow spoke in a TEDx presentation about her experience with vitiligo in November 2014. She was presented with the 'Role Model' award at the 2015 Portuguese GQ Men of The Year event.

=== 2018 Canadian Grand Prix ===
At the 2018 Canadian Grand Prix, Harlow was invited to wave the chequered flag, signifying the end of the race. A miscommunication between race officials led to Harlow being instructed to wave the flag on what should have been the penultimate lap of the race. As a result of the application of the Formula One sporting regulations, the final result was declared based on the positions at the end of lap 68 (i.e., the official race distance was shortened by two laps from the scheduled distance of 70 laps). The error did not seriously impact the race result.

=== Acting ===
Harlow made her acting debut in the 2023 horror film Alone at Night, followed by romantic comedy The Perfect Find that same year. In 2024, she made a guest appearance as herself in television dramedy Grown-ish, followed by a voice role in the cartoon series Monster High. She had a lead role in the Marvel Cinematic Universe animated series Eyes of Wakanda.

=== Other work ===
Harlow has appeared in music videos; these including JMSN's "The One", Eminem's "Guts Over Fear", Calvin Harris' "Promises", and Black Eyed Peas' "Where's the Love?". She cameoed in Beyoncé's "visual album" Lemonade and was in a video of Lilly Singh (a.k.a. IISuperwomanII) on YouTube named "Three Girls, One Elevator".

In March 2022 Harlow founded the sun care and skincare brand Cay Skin, saying she was influenced to do so after being badly sunburned on a photoshoot, where the photographer requested she not reapply sunscreen to avoid the white cast most sunscreen products leave in photos.

== Filmography ==
=== Film ===
Year	Title	Role	Notes
2023	Alone at Night	Lauren	
2023	The Perfect Find	Suki	
2026	The Devil Wears Prada 2	Herself	

=== Television ===
Year	Title	Role	Notes
2014	Access Hollywood	Herself	Episode: "June 26, 2014"
2014	America's Next Top Model	Herself	6th place
2015	Prominent!	Herself	Episode: "February 13, 2015"
2015	What Would You Do?	Herself	Season 10; Episode 3
2018	Good Morning America	Herself	"Meet the first model with vitiligo to walk in the Victoria's Secret fashion show"
2019	The Tonight Show Starring Jimmy Fallon	Herself	"Winnie Harlow Got Her Name After Defending Friends from Some Rude Boys"
2019	Vogue	Herself	"Winnie Harlow's Afterparty Beauty Look — Just in Time for Fashion Week"
2019	The Ellen DeGeneres Show	Herself	"‘Fearless’: Ashley Graham and Winnie Harlow Surprise Aspiring Actor"
2019-2020	Keeping Up with the Kardashians	Herself	3 episodes
2020	Rupaul's Drag Race	Herself	Episode: Madonna: The Unauthorized Rusical
2020	Legendary	Herself	Episode: Capes & Tights
2022	The Kardashians	Herself	Episode: One Night in Miami
2023	Canada's Drag Race	Herself	Episode: Lip Sync Slay-Offs
2024	Grown-ish	Herself	Episode: California Love
2024	Monster High	Dr. Alcott (voice)	Episode: Codex Come Back/Officially Complicated
2025	Eyes of Wakanda	Noni (voice)	Episode: "Into the Lion's Den"

=== Music videos ===
Song	Year	Artist	Reference(s)
"The One"	2014	JMSN	
"Guts Over Fear"	2014	Eminem ft. Sia	
"Lemonade"	2016	Beyoncé	
"Promises"	2018	Calvin Harris and Sam Smith	
"True Love"	2022	Wizkid	
"We Still Don't Trust You"	2024	Future, Metro Boomin and The Weeknd	
"Soltera"	2024	Shakira	

== Awards and nominations ==
Year	Organization	Award	Work	Result
2015	Gala Spa Awards 2015	Beauty Idol	Herself	Won
2015	Portuguese GQ Men of The Year	Role Model	Herself	Won
2016	Teen Choice Awards	Choice Model	Herself	Nominated
2017	Teen Choice Awards	Choice Model	Herself	Nominated
2017	Glamour Awards	Editor's Award	Herself	Won
2017	Shorty Awards	Fashion	Herself	Won
