= Uzoma Dunkwu =

Nigerian animator (born 1985)

- Dunkwu in 2026
- Born: 3 October 1985 (age 41); Lagos, Nigeria
- Education: University of Benin (BEng)
- Occupations: Animator; artist; director; educator
- Known for: Eyes of Wakanda, Iyanu
- Awards: Primetime Emmy Award for Outstanding Individual Achievement in Animation, Concept Art Association Award
- Website: https://www.uzomadunkwu.com/

Uzoma Harry Dunkwu (born Oct 3, 1985), known professionally as Uzoma Dunkwu, is a Nigerian animator, artist, director and educator. He worked for Marvel Animation and Lion Forge Entertainment, where he designed characters for Eyes of Wakanda (2025) and Iyanu (2025) animated series respectively. Some other studios he worked with include Walt Disney Studios and Netflix Animation.

== Early Life ==
Dunkwu was born in Lagos, Nigeria in 1985. As a child, he learnt to draw superhero characters by tracing comic books. He chose the scientific path academically from secondary school. Dunkwu graduated from the University of Benin, Nigeria with a Bachelor's degree in electrical/electronics engineering.

== Career ==
In 2014, Dunkwu established Scroll Comics, which launched its debut comic series titled Photon 7. He later pivoted from comics to animation when he founded Scroll Entertainment in June, 2015. The Lagos-based studio creates illustrations and animated contents.

Dunkwu took part in the 2015 Samsung Tech Meets Art contest, where he was the second place winner. His prize-winning artwork depicted the National Theatre, Nigeria in a futuristic environment with levitating cars.

In 2018, Dunkwu organised an artistic storytelling contest—Sketchathon, centered around the FIFA World Cup to empower illustrators, animators and sequence/comic artists. The art competition was sponsored by Merrybet. Six out of four hundred artists who participated were entitled to two million Naira worth of cash prizes.

In 2020, Dunkwu began to create culturally specific character designs. In his own words, "After a LinkedIn post, I made that went viral... I realised that many people from all around the world are seeking unique voices, specifically from underrepresented cultures." He went on to author an African Attire Coloring Book with a grant from Africa No Filter. The book was published in February 2022.

In October 2025, a few months after the release of Eyes of Wakanda on Disney+, Dunkwu won a Concept Art Association Award at LightBox Expo for his animated series character concept design of Noni. The award was received on his behalf by his colleague at Marvel Animation, Joshua James Shaw.

In August 2026, Dunkwu became a juried winner of the 78th Primetime Creative Arts Emmy Award for his character design work on Eyes of Wakanda, "Into the Lion's Den" (Episode 1). He was one of the five winning artists in the "Outstanding Individual Achievement In Animation" category.

== Filmography ==
Dunkwu is best known for his character designs for Marvel Animation's animated series Eyes of Wakanda. He joined the production in August 2021 as an early concept artist. Dunkwu was responsible for the initial character ideation under the direction of Todd Harris and developed early designs for five Dora Milaje characters, including Noni. The early designs later defined the character look across the series under the supervision of Joshua James Shaw.

== Awards ==
Dunkwu's CAA Award

In October 2025, Dunkwu won a Concept Art Association Award, Animated Series Character Concept for Noni—Eyes of Wakanda.

In August 2026, Dunkwu won a Primetime Emmy Award for Outstanding Individual Achievement In Animation, Character Design for Eyes of Wakanda—"Into the Lion's Den".

In September 2026, Dunkwu received an International Excellence In Animation award from the U.S. Mission in Nigeria, in recognition of his Primetime Emmy award win for his work on Eyes of Wakanda. This honour acknowledges Dunkwu's historic achievement and leadership in expanding cross-Atlantic creative collaboration.
