= Denny Dent =

American painter

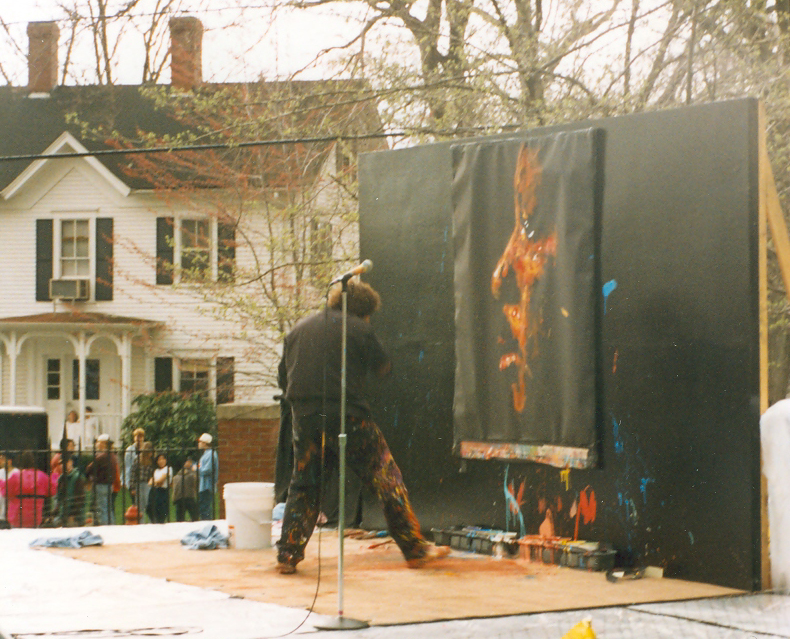
Denny Dent painting Martin Luther King Jr. at the Tufts University Spring Fling in 1995. The painting currently hangs in the Mayer Campus Center at Tufts.

Dennis E. "Denny" Dent (April 5, 1948 – March 29, 2004) was an American speed painter who was known for his frenetic performances as he painted large portraits of celebrities.

Dent was born in Oakland, California, to a family of artists and graduated from Oakland High School. "My grandfather was ambidextrous," he says, giving a nod to the gene pool for his two-fisted talents, "a cabinetmaker and an artist. My mother was a painter and always told me I was an artist. That's the heritage of the family." Though no one's been able to verify it, Dent's grandfather insisted they are direct descendants of Titian, the Renaissance Italian master. He credited his mother and speed painter D. Westry with influencing his art. His style emerged after he painted a spontaneous portrait of John Lennon at a 1980 vigil. Dent married Ali Christina Flores.

A Denny Dent performance, which he referred to as a "Two-Fisted Art Attack," consisted of him rapidly painting on a 6-foot-tall (1.8 m) black canvas with multiple brushes in both hands, as well as painting with his bare hands, to a musical accompaniment. Over the course of just a few pop/rock songs, he would complete a portrait. His subjects were most often musicians, but also included other entertainers, sports figures, and political leaders. One of his most famous performances was at the Woodstock '94 concert.

Dent could also paint with his feet, but seldom did so in public. What he called his "dance on canvas" featured maniacal, mesmerizing movement, but he regarded the sermons he shouted over the music while he painted as his main mission. He said he turned down mention in Guinness World Records as the world's fastest artist because he feared the distinction might detract from his inspirational message about the saving graces of art.

"I'm out to disturb the heart of the nation," he told former President Gerald Ford when he painted him in eight minutes at Caesars Palace in Las Vegas, according to an article in the Rocky Mountain News in 1995. "I've got no time to lose."

A painting that Dent did of Albert Einstein hangs in the Lecture Halls building at the St. Louis Community College–Meramec campus.

Dent died in Denver of complications from a heart attack.

== In popular culture ==
On the History channel series Pawn Stars, Dent's green painting of Jim Morrison is featured prominently on a wall of the shop. The shop also has on display Dent's paintings of Stevie Wonder and Jimi Hendrix, and in one episode acquired a portrait of John Lennon painted by Dent.
