= Eric Hughes (basketball) =

American basketball coach

Personal information
- Born: April 30, 1965 (age 61) Oakland, California, U.S.

Career information
- High school: Oakland (Oakland, California)
- College: Ohlone College (1983–1985); Cal State East Bay (1985–1987)
- NBA draft: 1987: undrafted
- Coaching career: 1987–present

Career history

Coaching
- 1987–1989: American HS (assistant)
- 1989–1991: Illinois State (assistant)
- 1991–1993: California (assistant)
- 1993–2002: Washington (assistant)
- 2007–2009: Toronto Raptors (basketball development consultant)
- 2009–2013: Toronto Raptors (assistant)
- 2013–2014: Brooklyn Nets (assistant)
- 2014–2018: Milwaukee Bucks (assistant)
- 2019–2021: Philadelphia 76ers (player development)
- 2021–2023: Philadelphia 76ers (assistant)
- 2023–2026: Dallas Mavericks (assistant)

Eric Hughes (born April 30, 1965) is an American basketball coach, who last worked as an assistant for the Dallas Mavericks of the National Basketball Association (NBA).

== College coaching career ==
Hughes got his first gig with the Illinois State Redbirds as an assistant coach from 1989 until he was hired as an assistant coach for the California Golden Bears in 1991 to 1993. Washington Huskies then hired him as an assistant for nine years after that.

== NBA coaching career ==
=== Toronto Raptors ===
Raptors gave Hughes his first gig in the NBA in the front office as a Basketball Development Consultant in 2007 until the Raptors decided to put him on their coaching bench in 2009.

=== Brooklyn Nets ===
Hughes joined Jason Kidd's bench as an assistant in June 2013.

=== Milwaukee Bucks ===
Hughes rejoined Kidd in Milwaukee until 2018.

=== Philadelphia 76ers ===
In 2019, after the Bucks fired him, Brett Brown hired him as a Player Development Coach. After Doc Rivers was hired, he was promoted to assistant coach.

== Personal life ==
Eric is married to Kristin Hughes and has two sons, Alexander James and Ryan Christopher. Hughes is also a native of Oakland, California.
