= Highland Hospital (Oakland, California) =

Coordinates: 37.7983°N 122.2316°W

- Alameda Health System
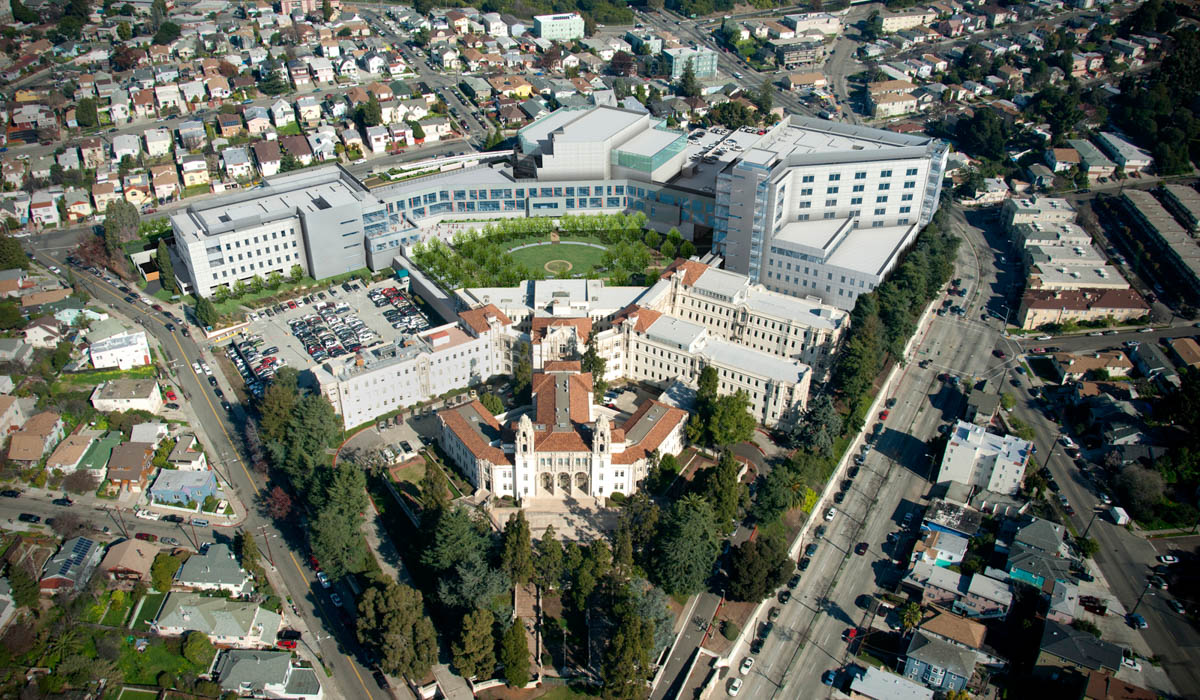
- Highland Hospital

Geography
- Location: 1411 E 31st St, Oakland, California, United States

Organization
- Care system: Public
- Type: Teaching, Community
- Affiliated university: UCSF

Services
- Emergency department: Level I trauma center
- Beds: 236

Links
- Website: www.alamedahealthsystem.org
- Lists: Hospitals in California

Highland Hospital is a public hospital in Alameda County, Oakland, California. It is operated by the Alameda Health System. It is the primary trauma center and a county hospital in Alameda County.

It has been an adult Level I trauma center since August 3, 2017 and an adult Level II trauma center since 1985 and operates the most trafficked emergency department in the county. Highland Hospital is affiliated with the University of California, San Francisco (UCSF) and is also home to the UCSF East Bay Surgery Program. Their Medical and Surgical residency programs are among the most competitive and highly sought after in the nation. In October 2020, the staff at Highland went on strike to improve safety for patients. The management had been subcontracting jobs to the private sector in order to remove benefits. Wait times in emergency room had been six to eight hours. The strike succeeded in stimulating Alameda County to replace the executive board, and the executive board began replacing the profit-oriented management with managers that had a greater appreciation for patient care.

== The Waiting Room ==
Highland Hospital was the location of The Waiting Room, a 2012 documentary film and social media project directed by Peter Nicks composed of vignettes of events, patients, doctors, and staff at Highland, compressed as if the events occurred over one day.

== See also ==
- List of hospitals in California
