= Hurricane Katrina: Race Against Time =

2025 American TV documentary series

- Genre: Documentary
- Directed by: Traci A. Curry
- Music by: Amanda Jones
- Countries of origin: United States; United Kingdom
- Original language: English
- No. of episodes: 5

Production
- Executive producers: Simon Chinn; Jonathan Chinn; Myles Estey; Ted Skillman; Ryan Coogler; Zinzi Coogler; Sev Ohanian; Peter Nicks; Kalia King; Sean David Johnson; Carolyn Payne
- Cinematography: Jerry Henry
- Editors: Jeremy Siefer; Carlos David Rivera; Rejh Cabrera; Erik L. Barnes
- Running time: 44 minutes
- Production companies: Lightbox; Proximity Media

Original release
- Network: National Geographic
- Release: July 27 – July 28, 2025

Hurricane Katrina: Race Against Time is a 2025 documentary series directed by Traci A. Curry. It explores Hurricane Katrina, from those who lived it. Ryan Coogler serves as an executive producer under his Proximity Media banner.

It premiered on July 27, 2025, on National Geographic.

== Premise ==
The series explores Hurricane Katrina, told from the perspective of those who lived it, and the aftermath.

== Episodes ==
No.	Title	Directed by	Original release date	U.S. viewers (millions)
1	"The Coming Storm"	Traci A. Curry	July 27, 2025	0.340
2	"Worst Case Scenario"	Traci A. Curry	July 27, 2025	0.339
3	"A Desperate Place"	Traci A. Curry	July 27, 2025	0.284
4	"Shoot to Kill"	Traci A. Curry	July 28, 2025	0.214
5	"Wake Up Call"	Traci A. Curry	July 28, 2025	0.174

== Production ==
In January 2023, it was announced National Geographic had ordered a documentary series revolving around Hurricane Katrina, with Lightbox set to produce. Ryan Coogler serves as an executive producer, alongside Zinzi Coogler, Sev Ohanian and Peter Nicks for Proximity Media.

== Reception ==
=== Critical reception ===
On the review aggregator website Rotten Tomatoes, Hurricane Katrina: Race Against Time has an approval rating of 100% based on 6 critics' reviews. Metacritic, which uses a weighted average, gave a score of 80 out of 100 based on 4 critics, indicating "generally favorable" reviews.

Daniel Fienberg of The Hollywood Reporter wrote: "A straightforward and passionate reminder that just because we know what went so very wrong in New Orleans doesn’t mean that lessons were learned or retained." Robert Lloyd of Los Angeles Times wrote: "Curry finds her own way through mountains of material in the series that is at once highly compelling and difficult to watch, though I suggest you do."
