= Aaron Covington =

American screenwriter and sound designer

- Born: June 5, 1984 (age 42); Michigan City, Indiana, United States
- Education: University of Southern California
- Occupations: Screenwriter, sound designer
- Writing career
- Notable work: Creed

Aaron Covington (born June 5, 1984) is an American screenwriter and sound designer from Northwest Indiana.

== Early life ==
He attended Ohio State University and graduated from the University of Southern California in 2011 with a MFA in film production. He took part in numerous productions for the USC School of Cinematic Arts as a sound designer.

== Career ==
Covington co-wrote the screenplay for the 2015 film Creed, a spin-off-sequel to the Rocky film series, starring Sylvester Stallone and Michael B. Jordan, with Ryan Coogler, who also directed the film. Covington is a personal friend of Coogler, and the two worked together with Stallone to green-light the film with MGM studios.

Covington wrote and directed the storyline for the MyCareer mode in the video game NBA 2K17.
