= The Force (film) =

- Directed by: Peter Nicks
- Written by: Linda Davis; Lawrence Lerew; Peter Nicks
- Starring: Sean Whent; Libby Schaaf
- Release date: January 22, 2017 (Sundance)
- Running time: 80 minutes
- Country: United States
- Language: English

The Force is a 2017 documentary film directed by Peter Nicks. The documentary describes two years of efforts by the Oakland Police Department to implement reforms against police misconduct and scandals, at a time of growing social unrest, protests demanding increased police accountability, and ongoing federal oversight. The film won the Documentary Directing Award at the 2017 Sundance Film Festival and a Golden Gate Award at the 2017 San Francisco International Film Festival.

== Reception ==
On Rotten Tomatoes it has an approval rating of 87% based on reviews from 31 critics.
