= Stephen Curry: Underrated =

2023 documentary by Peter Nicks

- Release poster
- Directed by: Peter Nicks
- Produced by: Peter Nicks; Ryan Coogler; Sean Havey; Erick Peyton; Marissa Torres Ericson; Ben Cotner
- Cinematography: Sean Havey
- Edited by: J. D. Marlow
- Music by: Nathan Matthew David
- Production companies: A24; Unanimous Media; Proximity Media
- Distributed by: A24; Apple TV+
- Release dates: January 23, 2023 (Sundance); July 21, 2023 (United States)
- Running time: 109 minutes
- Country: United States
- Language: English

Stephen Curry: Underrated is a 2023 American sports documentary film about basketball player Stephen Curry. The film was directed by Peter Nicks, and it premiered at the 2023 Sundance Film Festival before being released in theaters and on Apple TV+ on July 21, 2023.

== Synopsis ==
The film follows the career of basketball star Stephen Curry from his 2008 NCAA Tournament run with Davidson College through the 2021–22 Golden State Warriors run at another NBA Championship, where Curry also received the NBA Finals Most Valuable Player Award.

== Production ==
A24 green-lit production of Stephen Curry: Underrated in August 2021 with Peter Nicks directing and producing the first project in the first-look deal between Unanimous Media and A24. In October 2022, Apple joined the project to have it as one of their Apple Original Films.

== Release ==
The film had its premiere on January 23, 2023, at the Sundance Film Festival. The film was released in theaters and on Apple TV+ on July 21, 2023.

== Reception ==
On the review aggregator website Rotten Tomatoes, 85% of 34 critics' reviews are positive, with an average rating of 6.9/10. The website's consensus reads: "Shoots and scores, dunking us into the underdog life of Stephen Curry with a smooth swish." Metacritic assigned the film a weighted average score of 69 out of 100, based on 11 critics, indicating "generally favorable reviews".

Bill Edelstein of Variety wrote, "With enough fresh stories to keep basketball fanatics engaged and a coda that every soccer mom will appreciate, this is a film that’s worthy of its subject." Steve Greene of IndieWire described the film as "...steadily entertaining throughout. At the same time, it’s hard to escape the feeling that this film is struggling to make a compelling case for its own existence."
