= Creed (film) =

2015 film by Ryan Coogler

- Theatrical release poster
- Directed by: Ryan Coogler
- Screenplay by: Ryan Coogler; Aaron Covington
- Story by: Ryan Coogler
- Based on: Characters by Sylvester Stallone
- Produced by: Irwin Winkler; Robert Chartoff; Charles Winkler; William Chartoff; David Winkler; Kevin King-Templeton; Sylvester Stallone
- Starring: Michael B. Jordan; Sylvester Stallone; Tessa Thompson; Phylicia Rashad; Anthony Bellew
- Cinematography: Maryse Alberti
- Edited by: Michael P. Shawver; Claudia Castello
- Music by: Ludwig Göransson
- Production companies: Metro-Goldwyn-Mayer Pictures; New Line Cinema; Chartoff-Winkler Productions
- Distributed by: Warner Bros. Pictures
- Release dates: November 20, 2015 (Regency Village Theater); November 27, 2015 (United States)
- Running time: 133 minutes
- Country: United States
- Language: English
- Budget: $35–40 million
- Box office: $174.1 million

Creed is a 2015 American sports drama film directed by Ryan Coogler, who co-wrote the screenplay with Aaron Covington. It is the seventh installment in the Rocky franchise, and serves as a spin-off/sequel to Rocky Balboa (2006). It stars Michael B. Jordan, Sylvester Stallone, Tessa Thompson, Phylicia Rashad, Tony Bellew, and Graham McTavish. In the film, amateur boxer Adonis Creed (Jordan) is trained and mentored by Rocky Balboa (Stallone), the former rival turned friend of Adonis' father, Apollo Creed.

Although Rocky Balboa was originally considered the end of the franchise, Metro-Goldwyn-Mayer (MGM) hired Coogler in 2013 to develop a Rocky spin-off. Coogler and Covington's original screenplay was completed by April 2014, with the involvement of Jordan and Stallone also confirmed. The remaining cast were hired by January 2015, after which, principal photography began and lasted until that April, with filming locations including Liverpool, Philadelphia, and Gainesville, Georgia.

Creed became the last in the career of Robert Chartoff, one of the main producers of the franchise, who died two months after the end of filming, and this film was dedicated to him.

Creed had its premiere on November 19, 2015, at the Regency Village Theater in Los Angeles and was released in the United States on November 25, by Warner Bros. Pictures, to coincide with the 40th anniversary of the date of the opening scene in the first film. It grossed $174.1 million worldwide and received widespread acclaim from critics who praised Coogler's direction, the screenplay, and acting performances. Among its accolades, it was selected by National Board of Review as one of the top ten films of 2015, while Stallone won the National Board of Review Award for Best Supporting Actor, the Critics' Choice Award for Best Supporting Actor, and Golden Globe Award for Best Supporting Actor in a Motion Picture, and was nominated for the Academy Award for Best Supporting Actor. The film was followed by Creed II (2018) and Creed III (2023). The film is the first film in the franchise to have been produced by Stallone and the first he has not written.

== Plot ==
In 1998, Adonis "Donnie" Johnson—the son of former heavyweight champion Apollo Creed via an extramarital affair—is serving time in a Los Angeles youth detention center when Apollo's widow, Mary Anne Creed, visits and offers to take him in.

In the present time, Adonis is in Tijuana, Mexico, preparing for his match in an amateur boxing bout hosted in a bar. Upon returning from his latest fight, Adonis resigns from the Smith Boardley Financial Group to pursue his dream of becoming a professional boxer. Adonis auditions at Los Angeles' elite Delphi Boxing Academy, managed by family friend Tony "Little Duke" Evers Jr., the son of Apollo's trainer Tony "Duke" Evers, but is turned down. This rejection is further emphasized as Adonis is beaten in a sparring match by heavyweight champion and #2-pound-for-pound Danny "Wheelman" Wheeler after he publicly challenges the whole gym to prove himself, betting his 1967 Ford Mustang that no one can get a clean head shot on him. Mary Anne vehemently opposes his aspirations, remembering how her husband was killed in the ring by Ivan Drago thirty years ago. (Note: As depicted in Rocky IV (1985).) Undaunted, Adonis moves to Philadelphia in hopes of getting in touch with his father's old rival-turned-friend, former heavyweight champion, Rocky Balboa.

Adonis meets Rocky at a restaurant known as Adrian's, named in honor of his deceased wife, (Note: As depicted in Rocky Balboa (2006).) and asks Rocky to become his trainer. Rocky is reluctant to return to boxing due to having bad prior experiences as a trainer, (Note: As depicted in Rocky V (1990).) but eventually agrees. Adonis asks him about the "secret third fight" between him and Apollo just after Apollo helped Rocky regain the heavyweight title, (Note: As depicted in Rocky III (1982).) and Rocky reveals that Apollo won. Adonis trains at the Front Street Gym, with several of Rocky's longtime friends as cornermen. He also finds a love interest in Bianca, an aspiring singer and songwriter in the early stages of progressive hearing loss.

Adonis, using his biological mother's surname, Johnson, and the fight name "Hollywood", defeats local fighter Leo "The Lion" Sporino, which upsets the opposing corner. This leads to the opposing side leaking the news that Adonis is Apollo's illegitimate son. Rocky receives a call from the handlers of World Light Heavyweight Champion "Pretty" Ricky Conlan, who is being forced into retirement by an impending prison term. He offers to make Adonis his final challenger—provided that he fights using his father's surname, Creed. Adonis is hesitant at first, wanting to forge his own legacy. However, he eventually agrees with a little convincing from Bianca.

While helping Adonis train, Rocky suddenly collapses and is admitted to the hospital. Through further testing, he is diagnosed with non-Hodgkin's lymphoma. He is unwilling to undergo chemotherapy, citing its inability to save Adrian when she had ovarian cancer. The fact that his best friend and brother-in-law Paulie Pennino has now died along with all of his other friends as well as his estrangement from his son consign him to accept his eventual death. Adonis later finds out and urges him to seek treatment, but leaves in frustration after Rocky refuses and tells him he never truly believed they were a family. This causes him to lash out and get in a fight with an attendee at Bianca's concert after he compares him to his father, and is sent in jail. After being bailed out, Adonis refuses to train for his fight with Conlan if Rocky doesn't accept treatment, which Rocky finally agrees to.

Adonis fights Conlan at Goodison Park in Conlan's hometown of Liverpool, and many parallels emerge between the ensuing bout and Apollo and Rocky's first fight forty years earlier. (Note: As depicted in Rocky (1976).) First, before entering the ring, Adonis receives a present from Mary Anne – new American flag trunks similar to the ones Apollo and later Rocky wore. Additionally, to the surprise of nearly everyone, Adonis gives Conlan all he can handle. Conlan knocks Adonis down, but Adonis recovers to knock Conlan down for the first time in his career. Adonis goes the distance, but Conlan wins on a split decision. However, Adonis has won the respect of Conlan and the crowd through his efforts. As Max Kellerman puts it while calling the fight for HBO, "Ricky Conlan wins the fight, Adonis Creed wins the night." Conlan tells Adonis that he is the future of the light heavyweight division.

The film ends with Adonis and a frail but improving Rocky climbing the steps outside the entrance of the Philadelphia Museum of Art.

== Cast ==
- Michael B. Jordan as Adonis "Donnie" Creed (born Johnson): An underdog but talented light heavyweight boxer and the son of world heavyweight champion Apollo Creed.
  - Alex Henderson as young Adonis "Donnie" Johnson
- Sylvester Stallone as Robert "Rocky" Balboa: A two-time world heavyweight champion and Apollo's rival-turned-friend who becomes Adonis's trainer and mentor. He owns and operates an Italian restaurant in Philadelphia named after his deceased wife Adrian.
- Tessa Thompson as Bianca Taylor: A singer-songwriter with a hearing impairment who becomes Adonis's love interest.
- Phylicia Rashad as Mary Anne Creed: Apollo's widow and Adonis's stepmother, who takes in Adonis as a child following the death of Adonis's biological mother.
- Tony Bellew as "Pretty" Ricky Conlan: A highly formidable yet arrogant British boxer and the world light heavyweight champion.
- Graham McTavish as Tommy Holiday: Conlan's trainer.
- Wood Harris as Tony "Little Duke" Evers: One of Danny Wheeler's assistant trainers, the son of Apollo's, then Rocky's, trainer, Tony "Duke" Evers
- Ritchie Coster as Pete Sporino
- Brian Anthony Wilson as James

A number of figures (real-life fighters and trainers) from boxing play in the film:

- Andre Ward as Danny "Stuntman" Wheeler: A heavyweight boxer.
- Gabriel Rosado as Leo "The Lion" Sporino: A light heavyweight boxer.
- Jacob "Stitch" Duran as himself: An esteemed cutman in boxing, he previously portrayed the cutman of Mason "The Line" Dixon in Rocky Balboa.

Liev Schreiber voices an HBO 24/7 announcer, while Michael Buffer cameos as himself serving as ring announcer. Other sports media personalities who appear include ESPN's Tony Kornheiser, Michael Wilbon, Hannah Storm, and Max Kellerman, and HBO Sports' boxing announcer Jim Lampley.

Archive footage of Carl Weathers as Apollo Creed is used throughout the film.

== Production ==
=== Development and writing ===
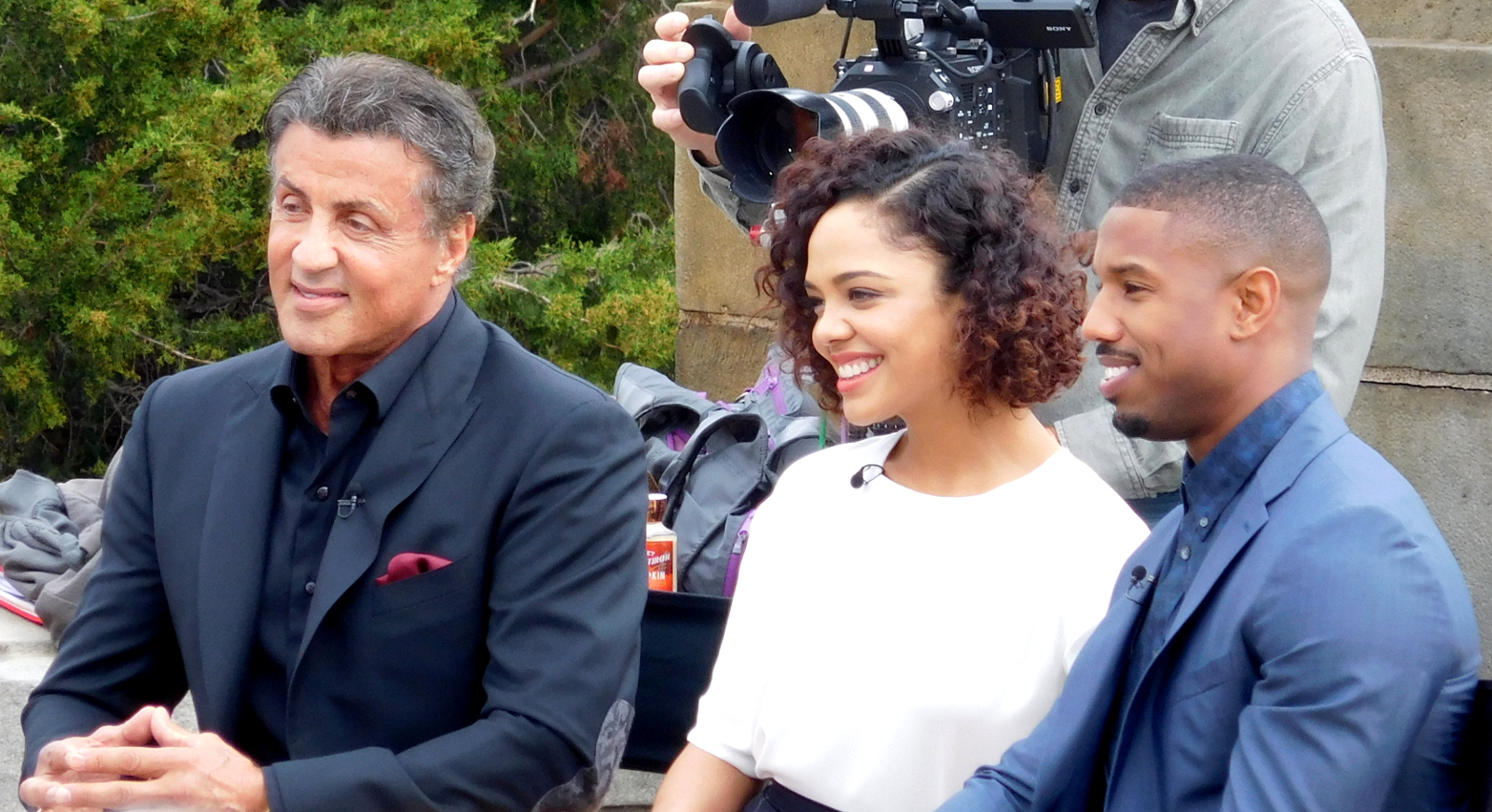
Stallone, Thompson, and Jordan promoting the film atop the Rocky Steps in November 2015

On July 24, 2013, it was announced that Metro-Goldwyn-Mayer (MGM) had signed on with Fruitvale Station (2013) director Ryan Coogler to direct a spin-off of Rocky (1976), a seventh film in the Rocky series, which Coogler would also co-write with Aaron Covington. Sylvester Stallone also worked on the screenplay for the seventh film. The film would focus on a man following in the footsteps of his late father, Apollo Creed, and getting a mentor in the now-retired Rocky Balboa. Michael B. Jordan was set for the role of Creed's son, Adonis "Donnie" Creed, and Stallone was set to reprise his character of Rocky. Original producers Irwin Winkler and Robert Chartoff would produce, along with Stallone and Kevin King-Templeton. On April 25, 2014, while talking to The Hollywood Reporter, Coogler stated that he had sent his latest draft to the studio, and confirmed the involvement of Jordan and Stallone. In an interview with Ellen, Sylvester Stallone reasoned why he refused to write Creed. He referred to a generational gap between the time when he wrote Rocky and the time when a film such as Creed would be making its appearance on the silver screen.

=== Pre-production ===
On November 10, real-life boxers Tony Bellew and Andre Ward joined the film, with Bellew to play a fighter, "Pretty" Ricky Conlan, the main opponent for Creed. Shooting was set to begin in January 2015, in Las Vegas and Philadelphia. On December 16, Tessa Thompson was added to the cast as the female lead. On January 8, 2015, Phylicia Rashad reportedly joined the film to play Mary Anne Creed, Apollo's widow. Sylvia Meals, who portrayed Mrs. Creed in Rocky II (1979) and Rocky IV (1985) had died in 2011. On January 21, Graham McTavish tweeted about his involvement in the film.

=== Filming ===
Principal photography began on January 19, 2015, on location at Goodison Park, with the first scene shot taking place during a Barclays Premier League football match between Everton (of which Stallone and native Evertonian Bellew are fans) and West Bromwich Albion. Goodison would later host both the climactic film fight between Adonis and Conlan and also Bellew's real-life title fight against Ilunga Makabu in May 2016, which was the first outdoor boxing match in Liverpool since 1949.

Filming also took place in Philadelphia. In early February, an empty store in Philadelphia was converted into a boxing gym, where some training scenes were shot.

On February 13, the crew was spotted filming in the Victor Cafe in South Philadelphia. The café was transformed into the "Adrian's Restaurant", and crew were again spotted filming there on February 16. Stallone and Jordan were also spotted on the set of the film on February 18. From February 24–27 and then on March 3, filming took place at Sun Center Studios in Aston Township.

== Music ==
=== Soundtrack ===
The musical score for Creed was written by Swedish composer Ludwig Göransson, who is only the third composer in the history of the Rocky series, following Bill Conti (Rocky, II, III, V, and Balboa) and Vince DiCola (Rocky IV). Creed also features a soundtrack that consists mostly of music new to the series, including hip hop tracks by artists such as Future, Meek Mill, and White Dave. Both a score and a soundtrack album were released on November 20, 2015, by WaterTower Music and Atlantic Records, respectively. One tribute to Conti's original soundtrack is included – the track "You're a Creed" uses both "Gonna Fly Now" and "Going the Distance".

== Release ==
=== Theatrical ===
On February 3, 2015, Warner Bros. Pictures slated the film to be released domestically on November 25, 2015. This date coincides with the 40th anniversary of the opening scene in the original film, where Rocky fights Spider Rico.

=== Piracy ===
On December 20, 2015, screeners of numerous prospective awards contenders, including Creed, were uploaded to torrent sites. The FBI has linked the case to co-CEO Andrew Kosove of Alcon Entertainment. Kosove claimed that he had "never seen this DVD".

== Reception ==
=== Box office ===
Creed grossed $109.8 million in North America and $63.8 million in other territories for a worldwide total of $173.6 million, against a budget of $35 million. In North America, Creed opened on Wednesday, November 25, 2015, alongside The Good Dinosaur and Victor Frankenstein, as well as the expanding wide releases of Brooklyn, Spotlight and Trumbo. The film ended up grossing $42.6 million in its first five days, including $30.1 million in its opening weekend, finishing third at the box office.

=== Critical response ===
The Los Angeles Times reported that the film received "early critical raves". On review aggregator website Rotten Tomatoes, the film holds an approval rating of 95% based on 315 reviews, with an average rating of 7.90/10. The website's critical consensus reads, "Creed brings the Rocky franchise off the mat for a surprisingly effective seventh round that extends the boxer's saga in interesting new directions while staying true to its classic predecessors' roots." On Metacritic, the film has a weighted average score of 82 out of 100, based on 42 critics. Audiences polled by CinemaScore gave the film an average grade of "A" on an A+ to F scale, while PostTrak reported filmgoers gave it an overall positive score of 85%.

A.V. Wire's Herman Dhaliwal gave the film a very positive review, writing, "I will say the film was everything I could have ever wanted and then some. It's a film that could have gone so wrong in so many ways so easily, but the results show something that is genuine and inspired. It takes the smartest possible routes with the story it wants to tell and delivers in basically every way it needed to. Ryan Coogler cements himself as one of the best rising filmmakers working today, as he crafts an emotional, funny, compelling and uplifting film that is full of strong performances." Andrew Barker of Variety stated that the film lives up to the expectation of its predecessors, while forging its own unique path. He also appreciated the performances of Stallone and Jordan, saying that Stallone deserved credit for taking a chance on young director Coogler, and that his trust had paid off. He concluded that the director "offered a smart, kinetic, exhilaratingly well-crafted piece of mainstream filmmaking". IGN reviewer John Lasser gave the film an 8.5 out of 10, saying, "Creed is a mirror of Rocky's story and we have all been watching that unfold on the big screen for decades. Coogler's film does nothing to break the mold. Rather, it shows that the mold exists for a reason. Jordan delivers a knockout performance, and Stallone does as well. In the end, we can all only hope that we'll get to see Adonis on screen for just as long as we've seen Rocky."

The screenplay was ranked the 22nd best American screenplay of the 21st century in IndieWire, with Zack Sharf writing, "Not only does the script manage to tell an authentic origin story of the young and determined Adonis Creed, but it also finds an authentic way to revive Sylvester Stallone's Rocky and make him the emotional lynchpin of Adonis' rise to champion boxer."

=== Accolades ===
Award	Category	Recipient(s)	Result	Ref.
Academy Awards	Best Supporting Actor	Sylvester Stallone	Nominated	
African-American Film Critics Association	Best Director	Ryan Coogler	Won	
African-American Film Critics Association	Best Supporting Actress	Tessa Thompson	Won	
African-American Film Critics Association	Breakout Performance	Michael B. Jordan	Won	
African-American Film Critics Association	Top Ten Films		Won	
Austin Film Critics Association	Best Actor	Michael B. Jordan	Nominated	
Austin Film Critics Association	Best Supporting Actor	Sylvester Stallone	Won	
Boston Online Film Critics Association	Boston Online Film Critics Association Award for Best Actor	Michael B. Jordan	Won	
Boston Online Film Critics Association	Boston Online Film Critics Association Award for Best Supporting Actor	Sylvester Stallone	Won	
Boston Online Film Critics Association	Ten Best Films of the Year		Won	
Boston Society of Film Critics	Best Supporting Actor	Sylvester Stallone	Runner-up	
Boston Society of Film Critics	Best Original Score	Ludwig Göransson	Runner-up	
Chicago Film Critics Association Awards	Best Supporting Actor	Sylvester Stallone	Nominated	
Critics' Choice Awards	Best Supporting Actor	Sylvester Stallone	Won	
Empire Awards	Best Actor	Michael B. Jordan	Nominated	
Empire Awards	Best Director	Ryan Coogler	Nominated	
Golden Globe Awards	Best Supporting Actor	Sylvester Stallone	Won	
Golden Raspberry Awards	Razzie Redeemer Award	Sylvester Stallone	Won	
Houston Film Critics Society	Best Supporting Actor	Sylvester Stallone	Nominated	
Indiana Film Journalists Association	Best Film		Nominated	
Indiana Film Journalists Association	Best Director	Ryan Coogler	Nominated	
Indiana Film Journalists Association	Best Supporting Actor	Sylvester Stallone	Nominated	
Kansas City Film Critics Circle	Best Supporting Actor	Sylvester Stallone	Nominated	
Las Vegas Film Critics Society	Best Picture		Nominated	
Las Vegas Film Critics Society	Best Director	Ryan Coogler	Nominated	
Las Vegas Film Critics Society	Best Actor	Michael B. Jordan	Nominated	
Las Vegas Film Critics Society	Best Supporting Actor	Sylvester Stallone	Won	
Los Angeles Film Critics Association	New Generation Award	Ryan Coogler	Won	
MTV Movie Awards	Movie of the Year		Nominated	
MTV Movie Awards	Best Male Performance	Michael B. Jordan	Nominated	
NAACP Image Award	Outstanding Motion Picture		Nominated	
NAACP Image Award	Outstanding Actor in a Motion Picture	Michael B. Jordan	Won	
NAACP Image Award	Outstanding Supporting Actress in a Motion Picture	Phylicia Rashad	Won	
NAACP Image Award	Outstanding Supporting Actress in a Motion Picture	Tessa Thompson	Nominated	
NAACP Image Award	Outstanding Directing in a Motion Picture	Ryan Coogler	Won	
NAACP Image Award	Outstanding Writing in a Motion Picture	Ryan Coogler, Aaron Covington	Won	
National Board of Review	Top Ten Films		Won	
National Board of Review	Best Supporting Actor	Sylvester Stallone	Won	
National Society of Film Critics	Best Actor	Michael B. Jordan	Won	
New York Film Critics Online	Best Director	Ryan Coogler	Nominated	
New York Film Critics Online	Best Supporting Actor	Sylvester Stallone	Nominated	
Online Film Critics Society	Best Actor	Michael B. Jordan	Nominated	
Online Film Critics Society	Best Supporting Actor	Sylvester Stallone	Nominated	
Phoenix Critics Circle	Best Supporting Actor	Sylvester Stallone	Won	
San Francisco Film Critics Circle	Best Supporting Actor	Sylvester Stallone	Nominated	
Satellite Awards	Best Supporting Actor	Sylvester Stallone	Nominated	
Southeastern Film Critics Association	Best Supporting Actor	Sylvester Stallone	Won	
St. Louis Gateway Film Critics Association	Best Supporting Actor	Sylvester Stallone	Won	
Teen Choice Awards	Choice Movie: Drama		Nominated	
Teen Choice Awards	Choice Movie Actor: Drama	Michael B. Jordan	Nominated	
Teen Choice Awards	Choice Movie Actress: Drama	Tessa Thompson	Nominated	
Vancouver Film Critics Circle	Best Supporting Actor	Sylvester Stallone	Nominated	
Washington D.C. Area Film Critics Association	Best Supporting Actor	Sylvester Stallone	Nominated	

== Sequels ==
In January 2016, Sylvester Stallone and MGM CEO Gary Barber confirmed that a sequel to Creed was in development. That same month, Stallone posed the possibility of seeing Milo Ventimiglia appear in the sequel, reprising his role as Rocky's son Robert Balboa from Rocky Balboa. Ventimiglia previously revealed during the development of Creed that he was open to returning to the franchise, stating, "I'll tell you what, if they invited me, I'd love to be there. If they didn't, I wouldn't be offended."

Also that month, it was reported that the sequel's release was tentatively set for November 2017, although it was later pushed back to an unconfirmed date. Development was seemingly delayed by the announcement Coogler had cast Michael B. Jordan in his next film, Marvel's Black Panther, thus delaying production until both men's schedules permitted.

A confrontation between Adonis "Donnie" Creed and Ivan Drago was hinted at on Instagram. Stallone later confirmed that he had finished writing the script for the sequel, which would see Dolph Lundgren reprising his role as Ivan Drago from Rocky IV. By October 2017, Stallone stated on his social media page that he would direct the film, however, by December of the same year, Steven Caple Jr. was announced as the director of Creed II. Boxer Florian Munteanu was cast as Drago's son. In an interview on The Ellen DeGeneres Show, Jordan confirmed that Creed II was his next project.

The film was released in 2018.

A sequel, Creed III, directed by Jordan in his directorial debut, was released on March 3, 2023.

== Video game ==
Creed: Rise to Glory – Released in 2018

== See also ==
- List of boxing films
