= The Waiting Room (2012 film) =

2012 documentary film

- Theatrical poster
- Directed by: Peter Nicks
- Produced by: Linda Davis; Peter Nicks
- Cinematography: Peter Nicks
- Edited by: Lawrence Lerew
- Release date: March 1, 2012 (True/False Film Festival)
- Running time: 81 minutes
- Country: United States
- Box office: $244,092

The Waiting Room is a 2012 American documentary film and social media project directed by Peter Nicks that follows the life and times of patients, doctors, and staff at Highland Hospital, a safety-net hospital in Oakland, California.

== Summary ==
The project includes a blog which features stories and conversations from the waiting room as well as behind-the-scenes information about the project. Frequent video updates from the project are posted on the blog. These videos examine what life is like in an American public hospital caring for a community of largely uninsured patients.

The project involves placing interactive storytelling booths in hospital waiting rooms. These kiosks will include the live-blogged reports from people living without health insurance, and an online portal that will distribute these stories and become an archive for the testimonials that will highlight the urgency of the national dialogue around health care.

== Production ==
The Waiting Room is funded by the MacArthur Foundation, Independent Television Service, The Fledgling Fund, The San Francisco Foundation, California Council for the Humanities, the Pacific Pioneer Find, and the San Francisco Film Society. Its key partners include the Bay Area Video Coalition, Active Voice, Pentagram, and The Takeaway. The Waiting Room has also been featured on the New York Times Lens Blog as Videos Worth Watching.

== Box Office ==
The film crossed approximately US$244,000 at the United State box office during the theatrical release.

== Critical reception ==
Both The Washington Post and the San Francisco Chronicle named the film on the 10 Best of the Year lists. Critic Ann Hornaday of The Washington Post named The Waiting Room the third best film of 2012. Wrote Hornaday: "This subtle, compassionate tableau lifts the veil on a world often described in terms of squalor and despair, finding the inherent dignity and perseverance therein." The movie holds a "fresh" rating of 100% on Rotten Tomatoes based on 34 reviews, with a weighted average of 8.41/10.
