= Ryan Coogler =

American filmmaker (born 1986)

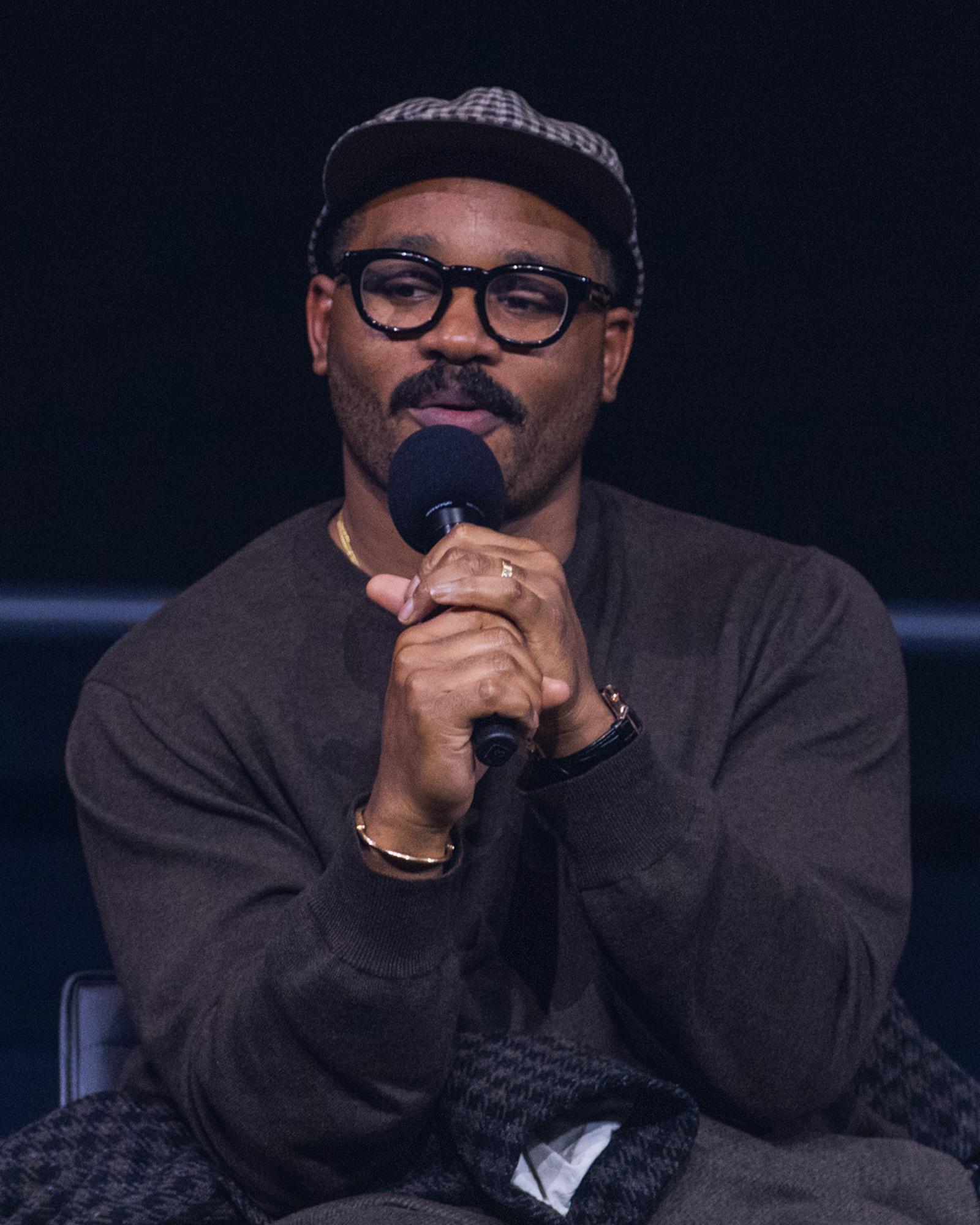
- Coogler in 2025
- Born: Ryan Kyle Coogler; May 23, 1986 (age 40); Oakland, California, U.S.
- Education: California State University, Sacramento (BS); University of Southern California (MFA)
- Occupations: Film director; screenwriter; producer
- Years active: 2009–present
- Title: Co-founder of Proximity Media
- Spouse: Zinzi Evans (m. 2016)
- Children: 3
- Awards: Full list

Ryan Kyle Coogler (born May 23, 1986) is an American filmmaker. His accolades include an Academy Award, a British Academy Film Award, a Grammy Award, a Golden Globe Award, ten Black Reel Awards, and fourteen NAACP Image Awards.

Coogler directed a few short films at the USC School of Cinematic Arts before his feature-length debut with Fruitvale Station (2013). He then transitioned to directing and writing franchise films such as the Rocky series spinoff Creed (2015), as well as the Marvel films Black Panther (2018) and Black Panther: Wakanda Forever (2022). Coogler also produced the historical drama Judas and the Black Messiah (2021) and the supernatural horror film Sinners (2025), which he also wrote and directed. He received nominations for the Academy Award for Best Picture for both films, while for Sinners he was also nominated for Best Director and won the Oscar for Best Original Screenplay. When Sinners won Outstanding Performance by a Cast in a Motion Picture at the 32nd Actor Awards (formerly the Screen Actors Guild Awards), it was the second win in the category for a film directed by Coogler, following Black Panther at the 25th Screen Actors Guild Awards in 2019, and it made him the first director in the awards' history to helm two ensemble winners.

In 2013, he was included on Time's list of the 30 people under 30 who are changing the world. In 2016, he was included in the annual Time 100 list of the world's most influential people. In 2018, Coogler was named the runner-up of Time's Person of the Year and he was included in the annual Time 100 list of the most influential people in the world. In 2021, Coogler, his wife Zinzi Coogler, and Sev Ohanian founded the multimedia production company Proximity Media.

== Early life and education ==
Coogler was born in Oakland, California. His mother, Joselyn, was a director of finance for a non-profit organization, and his father, Ira Coogler, was a juvenile hall probation counselor. Both parents graduated from California State University, East Bay. He has two brothers, Noah and Keenan. His uncle, Clarence Thomas, is a third-generation Oakland longshoreman, and the former secretary treasurer of the International Longshore and Warehouse Union. Coogler was raised as a Baptist, and attended Catholic schools.

Coogler lived in Oakland until age eight, when the family moved to Richmond, California. During his youth, he ran track and played football. He went to a private school and did well in math and science.

After graduating from high school, Coogler attended Saint Mary's College of California in Moraga, California on a football scholarship as a redshirt wide receiver his college freshman semester, intending to major in chemistry. The football players were encouraged to take a creative writing course. Coogler's professor Rosemary Graham praised his work, noting that it was very visual, and encouraged him to learn screenwriting. As a student athlete coming up in the Bay Area, Coogler befriended and often played against NFL running back Marshawn Lynch.

After Saint Mary's College of California canceled its football program in March 2004, Coogler transferred and earned a scholarship to Sacramento State, where he had 112 receptions for 1,213 yards and 6 touchdowns during his four years playing football. He graduated with a Bachelor of Science degree in finance in 2007. He then entered a three-year master's program at the USC School of Cinematic Arts, where he made a series of short films, graduating with an MFA in film in 2011. At USC he met composer Ludwig Göransson and they went on to collaborate on numerous projects.

== Career ==
=== 2009–2013: Early work and breakthrough ===
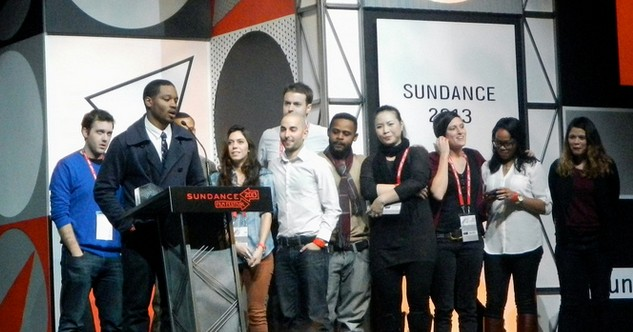
Coogler accepts the U.S. Grand Jury Prize: Dramatic with the crew of Fruitvale Station at the 2013 Sundance Film Festival.

While majoring in finance at CSU Sacramento, Coogler took film classes to explore his passion for filmmaking and worked on several short films titled "Story of a Dollar" and "Eyes Like Mine." While at the USC School of Cinematic Arts, Coogler directed four short films, three of which won or were nominated for various awards. Locks (2009) screened at the Tribeca Film Festival and won the Dana and Albert Broccoli Award for Filmmaking Excellence. Fig (2011), written by Alex George Pickering, won the HBO Short Film Competition at the American Black Film Festival, the DGA Student Film Award, and was nominated for Outstanding Independent Short Film at the Black Reel Awards. Gap (2011), written by Carol Lashof, won the Jack Nicholson Award for Achievement in Directing. In January 2013, Coogler said he was working on a graphic novel and young adult novel about an undisclosed subject matter.

In 2013, Coogler wrote and directed his first feature-length film, Fruitvale Station (originally titled Fruitvale), which told the story of the last 24 hours of the life of Oscar Grant (played by Michael B. Jordan), who was shot to death by a police officer at Oakland's Fruitvale BART station on January 1, 2009. Produced by Oscar-winning actor Forest Whitaker, the film premiered at the 2013 Sundance Film Festival, where it won the top Audience Award and Grand Jury Prize in the dramatic competition and was released in theatres on July 20, 2013. Made on a budget of $900,000, the film grossed over $17 million worldwide after its theatrical run.

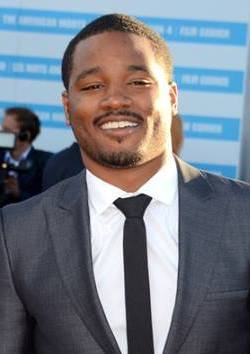
Coogler in 2013

Peter Travers of Rolling Stone called Fruitvale Station "a gut punch of a movie" and "an unstoppable cinematic force". A. O. Scott of The New York Times wrote that Coogler's "hand-held shooting style evokes the spiritually alert naturalism of Jean-Pierre and Luc Dardenne". Todd McCarthy of The Hollywood Reporter called it "a compelling debut" and "a powerful dramatic feature film". On Rotten Tomatoes, the film received a score of 94% based on 195 reviews, with a critical consensus that reads: "Passionate and powerfully acted, Fruitvale Station serves as a celebration of life, a condemnation of death, and a triumph for star Michael B. Jordan." Ann Hornaday, an American film critic for The Washington Post, compliments Coogler's artistic control of not showing biased or vilifying others in Fruitvale Station, but focusing on reflecting on the history of events the film is based on. The film appeared on several critics' top ten lists of the best films of 2013.

=== 2015–2019: Expansion with franchise films ===
In 2015, Coogler released his second film, Creed, a spin-off of the Rocky films, which Coogler directed and co-wrote with Aaron Covington. The film starred Michael B. Jordan as Apollo Creed's son Donnie, who is trained and mentored by his father's old friend and former rival Rocky Balboa, played by Sylvester Stallone. It received critical acclaim from critics and audiences and grossed over $173 million worldwide. Among its accolades, Stallone won the National Board of Review Award for Best Supporting Actor, the Critics' Choice Movie Award for Best Supporting Actor, and Golden Globe Award for Best Supporting Actor - Motion Picture, and was nominated for the Academy Award for Best Supporting Actor.

Creed II was not directed by Coogler, but he was an executive producer on the film. The sequel had Adonis Creed fight the son of Ivan Drago, the same man who killed Apollo Creed. The film had an estimated budget of $50,000,000 and grossed over $115,000,000 in the United States and Canada only.

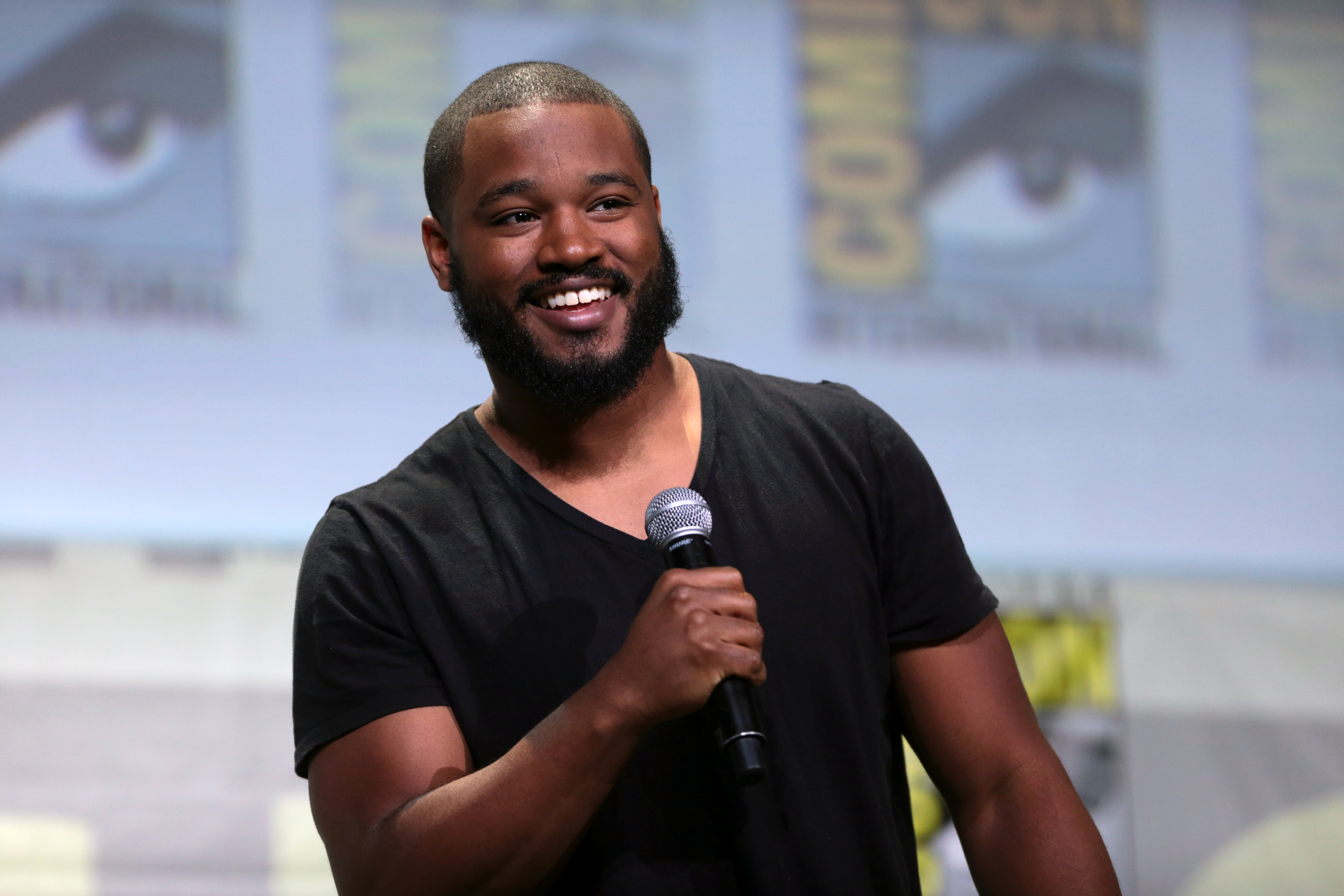
Coogler promoting Black Panther at the 2016 San Diego Comic-Con

Coogler served as an executive producer on the ESPN 30 for 30 film The Day the Series Stopped, about Game Three of the 1989 World Series between the San Francisco Giants and the Oakland Athletics, when the Loma Prieta earthquake shook the Bay Area to its core. In 2018, Coogler co-wrote and directed the Marvel film Black Panther, making him the first African-American Marvel Studios director. The film starred Chadwick Boseman as the titular character, who is crowned king of Wakanda following his father's death, but is challenged by his cousin, Erik Killmonger (played by Michael B. Jordan), who plans to abandon the country's isolationist policies and begin a global revolution.

Upon release, Black Panther grossed $1.3 billion worldwide and broke numerous box office records, becoming the highest-grossing film directed by an African-American director, the ninth-highest-grossing film of all time and the second-highest-grossing film of 2018. Black Panther received critical acclaim. Rotten Tomatoes' critical consensus reads, "Black Panther elevates superhero cinema to thrilling new heights while telling one of the MCU's most absorbing stories—and introducing some of its most fully realized characters." In an interview with the female stars from Black Panther by Entertainment Weekly, the general consensus was that their characters were well respected and well written. The film was also noted for its representation of African Americans and subject matter related to Afrofuturism. The film was nominated for seven awards at the 91st Academy Awards, winning three, and received numerous other accolades. Black Panther is the first superhero film to receive an Academy Award nomination for Best Picture, and the first MCU film to win several categories (those being for Best Costume Design, Best Production Design and Best Original Score).

=== 2020–present: Sinners and producing ===
In 2021, Coogler served as a co-producer alongside Charles D. King and Shaka King on the Fred Hampton biopic Judas and the Black Messiah, directed by Shaka King, which focused on the betrayal of Hampton (played by Daniel Kaluuya), chairman of the Illinois chapter of the Black Panther Party in late-1960s Chicago, by William O'Neal (played by LaKeith Stanfield). The film received critical acclaim and received six nominations at the 93rd Academy Awards, and earned Coogler, Shaka King and Charles D. King a nomination for Best Picture, the first for an African-American producing team. Also in 2021, Coogler served as a producer and an uncredited co-writer on Space Jam: A New Legacy, starring LeBron James. The film received generally negative reviews and was a financial failure, grossing $163 million worldwide on a budget of $150 million. One of the negative reviews previously mentioned comes from Rotten Tomatoes, in which the general consensus was that Space Jam: A New Legacy could not live up to the original Space Jam, even with any effort from Lebron James' humor and acting. Coogler returned to direct and co-write the Black Panther sequel, Black Panther: Wakanda Forever, which was released in the United States on November 11, 2022. It was a critical and commercial success, being nominated for five Academy Awards, winning one. Coogler wrote the story outline and served as a producer on Creed III. Creed III had an estimated budget of $75,000,000 and grossed $155,000,000 in the U.S. and Canada alone.

Coogler collaborated with Jordan for a fifth time on Sinners, a supernatural horror film, which was released in April 2025. It received critical acclaim. Autumn Durald Arkapaw, working alongside Ryan Coogler, shot a substantial share of the Imax sequences — about 20 percent of the film — with IMAX MSM 9802 cameras and 50mm and 80mm Panavision lenses that had been originally custom-designed for Nolan and Van Hoytema on Oppenheimer (AC Oct. ’23). Coogler negotiated a deal with Warner Bros. for the film, which included a provision for full ownership reversion 25 years after the film's release, granting him control over future licensing and royalties, giving Coogler first-dollar gross participation and final cut privileges His motive for owning the rights of the movie was from the film's narrative of black ownership.

At the 98th Academy Awards, Sinners received 16 nominations, breaking the Oscars' all-time nomination record. Coogler was nominated for Best Picture and Best Director while winning the Oscar for Best Original Screenplay. At the 79th British Academy Film Awards, Sinners became the most-nominated film by a Black director in the British Academy's history, while Coogler became the first Black filmmaker to win the BAFTA Award for Best Original Screenplay. He also won the Critics' Choice Movie Award for Best Original Screenplay, the Golden Globe Award for Cinematic and Box Office Achievement, and received nominations at the Directors Guild of America Awards, Producers Guild of America Awards, and Writers Guild of America Awards. His production credits on the film's accompanying soundtrack earned him his first Grammy Award in the Best Compilation Soundtrack for Visual Media category.

Proximity and Coogler co-produced the Marvel series Ironheart (2025) starring Dominique Thorne, who had debuted as the titular character in Wakanda Forever and the animated series Eyes of Wakanda for Disney+.

==== Upcoming projects ====
In 2015, it was announced that Ryan Coogler would work with Michael B. Jordan in an upcoming film, Wrong Answer, about the Atlanta Public Schools cheating scandal.

In February 2021, Coogler's production company Proximity Media signed an exclusive five-year deal with Disney to produce content for them, which includes a Disney+ television series based in Black Panther's home country of Wakanda. In November 2025, Coogler confirmed that Black Panther 3 would be his next feature film following Sinners.

Coogler is currently developing a new reboot of the TV series The X-Files. In April 2025, Coogler said the X-Files reboot would be his next project after Sinners, and he began working on the project by October of that year; Coogler said that he chose to work on the project due to his mother's love for the original series. A pilot had been ordered at Hulu by March 2026, set to be written and directed by Coogler while Jennifer Yale will serve as showrunner. In October 2026, a series order for the show was given by Hulu.

Coogler is also set to executive-produce an Animorphs TV series for Disney+ through Proximity Media. This will be the second Animorphs show after the live-action series.

== Themes and recognition ==
Black Panther (2018) broke numerous box office records and became the highest-grossing film of all time by an African American director. Many of Coogler's films have received widespread acclaim and commercial success. His work has been hailed by critics for centering on often overlooked cultures and characters—most notably African Americans. He frequently collaborates with actor Michael B. Jordan and composer Ludwig Göransson, who have, respectively, appeared in and composed all of his films.

== Personal life ==
Coogler has worked since age 21 as a counselor with incarcerated youth at San Francisco's Juvenile Hall, following in the footsteps of his father, who has long shared the same occupation. Coogler is also a founding member and supporter of the Blackout For Human Rights campaign, which is committed to addressing racial and human rights violations happening throughout the United States.

In 2016, Coogler married Zinzi Evans, with whom he has three children. The two had known each other since their early teens and began dating during their undergraduate years at Saint Mary's College of California. Evans was an integral part of Coogler's choice to delve into film production as she gifted him a screenwriting software during his years at Saint Mary's. Evans has Mississippi Delta Chinese ancestry through her father, and the discovery of this heritage inspired Coogler to include the Mississippi Delta Chinese community in his film Sinners.

In January 2022, Coogler tried to withdraw $12,000 from his account in a Bank of America branch in Atlanta, Georgia. While wearing a hat, sunglasses, and a face mask, he passed the teller his identification and a note stating "I would like to withdraw $12,000 cash from my checking account. Please do the money count somewhere else. I'd like to be discreet." The teller mistook him for a bank robber and asked her supervisor to contact police, who handcuffed and detained Coogler and two of his colleagues who were waiting outside. Once his identity was verified with both his California state ID card and his Bank of America card, Coogler was released and the bank issued a statement of apology. He later stated that "Bank of America worked with me and addressed it to my satisfaction and we have moved on."

== Filmography ==
=== Feature film ===
As director, writer, producer

Year	Title	Director	Writer	Producer	Notes	Ref.
2013	Fruitvale Station	Yes	Yes	No		
2015	Creed	Yes	Yes	No	Co-wrote with Aaron Covington	
2018	Black Panther	Yes	Yes	No	Co-wrote with Joe Robert Cole	
2022	Black Panther: Wakanda Forever	Yes	Yes	No	Co-wrote with Joe Robert Cole	
2025	Sinners	Yes	Yes	Yes		

As writer, producer

Year	Title	Writer	Producer	Ref.
2018	Creed II	No	Executive	
2021	Homeroom	No	Executive	
2021	Judas and the Black Messiah	No	Yes	
2021	Space Jam: A New Legacy	Uncredited (Note: Brought in for rewrites.)	Yes	
2023	Creed III	Story	Yes	
2023	Stephen Curry: Underrated	No	Yes	

=== Short films ===
Year	Title	Director	Writer	Notes
2009	Locks	Yes	Yes	Also actor and sound editor
2011	Fig	Yes	No	
2011	The Sculptor	Yes	Yes	

=== Other credits ===
Year	Title	Role	Notes
2009	On the Grind	Camera operator	Documentary short
2010	Get Some	Boom operator, sound editor and sound mixer	Short film
2012	It's Just Art, Baby	Camera operator and grip	Short film
2020	Soul	Special thanks	

=== Television ===
Year	Title	Director	Executive producer	Other	Notes	Ref.
2014	The Day the Series Stopped	No	Yes	No	TV movie	
2021	What If...?	No	No	Yes	Episode: "What If... T'Challa Became a Star-Lord?"; creative consultant	
2025	Ironheart	No	Yes	No	Miniseries; 6 episodes	
2025	Hurricane Katrina: Race Against Time	No	Yes	No	Miniseries; 5 episodes	
2025	Eyes of Wakanda	No	Yes	Yes	Miniseries; 4 episodes; developer	
2025	Marvel Zombies	No	No	Yes	Miniseries; 4 episodes; creative consultant	
TBA	The X-Files	Yes	Yes	Yes	Developer; writer, director	

== Reception of feature films ==
Year	Film	Rotten Tomatoes	Metacritic	Budget	Box Office		
Year	Film	Rotten Tomatoes	Metacritic	Budget	North America	International	Total Worldwide
2013	Fruitvale Station	94% (216 reviews)	85 (46 reviews)	$900,000	$16,101,339	$1,284,491	$17,385,830
2015	Creed	95% (315 reviews)	82 (42 reviews)	$40,000,000	$109,767,581	$64,400,000	$174,167,581
2018	Black Panther	96% (532 reviews)	88 (55 reviews)	$200,000,000	$700,059,566	$649,499,517	$1,349,926,083
2022	Black Panther: Wakanda Forever	84% (448 reviews)	67 (62 reviews)	$250,000,000	$453,829,060	$405,379,776	$859,208,836
2025	Sinners	97% (414 reviews)	84 (55 reviews)	$100,000,000	$278,578,513	$87,300,000	$365,878,513
Total				$590,900,000	$1,558,336,059	$1,207,863,784	$2,766,566,843

== Awards and Nominations ==
Awards and nominations received by Coogler's films
Year	Title	Academy Awards		BAFTA Awards		Golden Globe Awards	
Year	Title	Nominations	Wins	Nominations	Wins	Nominations	Wins
2015	Creed	1				1	1
2018	Black Panther	7	3	1	1	3	
2022	Black Panther: Wakanda Forever	5	1	1		2	1
2025	Sinners	16	4	13	3	7	2
Total		29	8	15	4	13	4

Directed Academy Award performances
Under Coogler's direction, these actors have received Academy Award nominations (and one win) for their performances in their respective roles.

Year	Performer	Film	Result
Academy Award for Best Actor
2025	Michael B. Jordan	Sinners	Won
Academy Award for Best Supporting Actor
2015	Sylvester Stallone	Creed	Nominated
2025	Delroy Lindo	Sinners	Nominated
Academy Award for Best Supporting Actress
2022	Angela Bassett	Black Panther: Wakanda Forever	Nominated
2025	Wunmi Mosaku	Sinners	Nominated
