= Zinzi Coogler =

American film producer (born 1985)

- Born: Zinzi Evans; April 18, 1985 (age 41); Oakland, California, U.S.
- Education: San Lorenzo High School; California State University, Fresno (BA)
- Occupation: Film producer
- Spouse: Ryan Coogler (m. 2016)
- Children: 3

Zinzi Coogler (née Evans; born April 18, 1985) is an American film producer best known for her professional collaborations with her husband, Ryan Coogler. She was an executive producer on the historical drama Judas and the Black Messiah (2021) and the sports drama Creed III (2023).

Coogler served as a lead producer for the first time on the horror film Sinners (2025), for which she won the Golden Globe Award for Cinematic and Box Office Achievement and earned an Academy Award nomination for Best Picture.

== Early life and education ==
Zinzi Evans was born on April 18, 1985, in Oakland, California to an African American father with Mississippi Delta Chinese ancestry and a Filipina mother. She was raised in the San Francisco Bay Area with her six siblings: five sisters and a brother. Evans was a three-time track and field captain at San Lorenzo High School, and graduated as an award-winning scholar athlete. She then studied communicative sciences and deaf studies at California State University, Fresno, where she was an outstanding cross country runner.

== Personal life ==
Evans first met Ryan Coogler while she was in high school; she became more interested in moviegoing while dating him. In an email sent to Marie Claire, Ryan Coogler noted her skills in breaking down films, telling them "I was in awe of her capacity for understanding the story and communicating ways it could improve since then." She later married Coogler in 2016, with whom she has three children. She would go on to produce her husband's 2025 film Sinners, for which she received a nomination at the 98th Academy Awards for Best Picture.

== Selected filmography ==
=== Film ===
Year	Film	Credit
2021	Judas and the Black Messiah	Executive producer
2021	Space Jam: A New Legacy	Executive producer
2023	Stephen Curry: Underrated	Executive producer
2023	Creed III	Executive producer
2025	Sinners	Producer
