= Rocky II =

1979 film by Sylvester Stallone

- Theatrical release poster
- Directed by: Sylvester Stallone
- Written by: Sylvester Stallone
- Produced by: Irwin Winkler; Robert Chartoff
- Starring: Sylvester Stallone; Talia Shire; Burt Young; Carl Weathers; Burgess Meredith
- Cinematography: Bill Butler
- Edited by: Danford B. Greene; Stanford C. Allen; Janice Hampton
- Music by: Bill Conti
- Production company: Chartoff-Winkler Productions
- Distributed by: United Artists
- Release date: June 15, 1979 (United States)
- Running time: 119 minutes
- Country: United States
- Language: English
- Budget: $7 million
- Box office: $200.1 million

Rocky II is a 1979 American sports drama film written, directed by, and starring Sylvester Stallone. It is the direct sequel to Rocky (1976) and the second installment in the Rocky franchise. It also stars Talia Shire, Burt Young, Carl Weathers, and Burgess Meredith. Set immediately after the events of the original film, Rocky Balboa (Stallone), struggling to adjust to his newfound fame and family life, finds himself in a rematch fiercely demanded by Apollo Creed (Weathers).

Development of Rocky II began in 1977, after Stallone completed the screenplay. United Artists was reluctant to allow Stallone to direct after John G. Avildsen, the director of the first film, was unable to return. Stallone was eventually hired after refusing to allow the film to be made without him as director, and the returns of the rest of the cast were secured soon thereafter. Principal photography commenced in 1978, with filming held primarily on location in Philadelphia, during which Stallone sustained several injuries. The film is dedicated to the late Jane Oliver who was Stallone's first agent.

Rocky II was theatrically released in the United States by United Artists on June 15, 1979. The film received generally positive reviews from critics, with praise for its characterization, finale, and Stallone's performance. It grossed $200.1 million worldwide and $85 million in North America, making it the third highest-grossing film of 1979 domestically and the second highest-grossing film worldwide. It was the last installment in the franchise to be released solely by United Artists before its merger with Metro-Goldwyn-Mayer in 1981. A sequel, Rocky III, was released in 1982.

== Plot ==
On New Year's Day 1976, world heavyweight boxing champion Apollo Creed has successfully defended his title in a split decision against challenger Rocky Balboa. (Note: As depicted in Rocky (1976).) He and Rocky are taken to the same hospital. Despite their agreement that there would be no rematch, Apollo challenges Rocky again that night to prove that Rocky going the distance with him was a fluke, but Rocky declines and retires from professional boxing. Balboa's girlfriend, Adrian, supports his choice as do his doctors who go on to reveal that Rocky will require surgery for a detached retina, a condition that could lead to permanent blindness. In a private moment, Rocky goes to see a recuperating Apollo, and asks whether Apollo gave his all in the fight; Apollo confirms that he did.

After Rocky is released from the hospital, he enjoys the benefits of his newfound celebrity status. An agent sees Rocky as a potential endorsement and sponsorship goldmine, and his sudden wealth encourages him to propose to Adrian; she happily accepts, and they marry in a small ceremony. Soon after, Adrian reveals that she is pregnant. Meanwhile, Apollo, fueled by hate mail claiming he fixed the fight in order to protect his reign as champ, becomes obsessed with the idea that a rematch is the only way to discredit Rocky's performance. Determined to rectify his boxing career's only blemish, Apollo demands his team do whatever necessary to goad Rocky out of retirement, despite the pleas of his friend and trainer Tony "Duke" Evers, that Rocky's ability to absorb punishment is too dangerous for his chances to successfully defend the title a second time.

Rocky at first seems unaffected by Apollo's smear campaign, but his limited education and illiteracy soon lead him into financial problems. After several unsuccessful attempts to find employment, Rocky visits Mickey Goldmill, his trainer and manager, at his gym to talk about the possibility of facing Apollo. Mickey declines out of concern for Rocky's health, but he changes his mind after Apollo publicly insults Rocky. Adrian confronts Rocky about the danger of returning to boxing and reminds him of the risk to his eyesight, but he retorts that fighting is all he knows. Adrian backs down but refuses to support him.

Rocky and Mickey begin training, but Rocky is unfocused due to Adrian's disapproval. Adrian's brother, Paulie, confronts his sister about not supporting her husband, but Adrian faints during the confrontation and is rushed to the hospital, where she goes into labor. Despite being born prematurely, the baby is healthy, but Adrian falls into a coma. Rocky blames himself for what happened and refuses to leave her bedside until she wakes up, and will not go to see his new baby until the baby can be together with his mother. When Adrian comes out of her coma she finds Rocky by her bedside, and the couple is soon shown their new baby boy, who they name Robert "Rocky Jr". Adrian gives her blessing to the rematch and Rocky quickly gets into shape for the fight.

On Thanksgiving, the night of the match, Apollo makes a public goal of beating Rocky in no more than two rounds to prove the first match going the distance was a fluke. Unlike the first fight, Apollo has trained heavily. In order to protect his vulnerable eye, Rocky opts to fight right-handed rather than his natural southpaw, but this leaves him at a major disadvantage, as he is knocked down twice by Apollo and outclassed for much of the fight. Going into the fifteenth and final round, Apollo is well ahead on points and only needs to stay away from Rocky to win the fight by decision. However, Apollo wants to win by knock-out in order to erase any doubts about his superiority and ignores Duke's desperate pleas to stay back and fight from distance.

In the final round, Rocky switches back to his natural stance and, in dramatic fashion, unleashes a series of counter punches on Apollo. Both men, exhausted, trade punches until Rocky is able to gain the upper hand and knock Apollo down. The blow causes Rocky to also lose his balance and fall at the same time. As both men struggle to regain their feet, Rocky is able to will himself up at the count of 9 while Apollo collapses from exhaustion, giving Rocky the win by knockout and making him the new world heavyweight champion. Rocky then gives an impassioned speech to the crowd and holds the belt over his head with a message for Adrian, who is watching the fight on television: "Yo, Adrian, I did it!"

== Cast ==
- Sylvester Stallone as Robert "Rocky" Balboa, "The Italian Stallion": the underdog who was given one chance at winning the heavyweight championship from Apollo Creed in the first film. Due to the public's belief that it was very possible that Rocky could have won, he gets a second shot at the title in this film.
- Talia Shire as Adrian Balboa: Rocky's love interest-turned-wife. During labor, with their first son, she enters a coma for a large portion of the film.
- Burt Young as Paulie Pennino: Rocky's best-friend-turned-brother-in-law
- Carl Weathers as Apollo Creed: The current world heavyweight champion who gave Rocky a shot at the title in the first film, during which he won by split-decision. Because of the close outcome of the fight the general public believes that Apollo did not necessarily win, and thus he gives Rocky a second chance in a rematch.
- Burgess Meredith as Michael "Mickey" Goldmill: Rocky's friend, manager and trainer; a former bantamweight fighter from the 1920s and the owner of the local boxing gym.
- Tony Burton as Tony "Duke" Evers: Apollo's father-figure, friend, trainer, and manager.
- Sylvia Meals as Mary Anne Creed: Apollo Creed's wife.
- Seargeoh Stallone as Robert "Rocky" Balboa Jr.: Rocky and Adrian's newborn child. Seargeoh appeared in the film uncredited.
- Paul Micale as Father Carmine: Rocky's priest.
- Joe Spinell as Tony Gazzo: loan shark and Rocky's friend and former employer.
- Frank McRae as meat foreman.

Jeff Temkin portrays the ring announcer. Appearing as themselves are referee Lou Filippo and commentators Brent Musburger, Stu Nahan and Bill Baldwin. LeRoy Neiman makes an uncredited non-speaking cameo appearance during the training scenes in the film; he is shown drawing a picture of Apollo while he is training.

== Production ==
=== Development and writing ===
Rocky's run on Benjamin Franklin Parkway, Spring Garden Street, and the Rocky Steps. Approximately 800 children were used as extras in this scene.

After the great success of the first Rocky, the producers were eager to make a sequel. Stallone again wrote the script, originally titled Rocky II: Redemption. He claimed he wanted to write it faster than the original which took 3 days and wrote the first draft in 29½ hours. However, due to other film commitments, he wasn't ready to start filming until 1978. John G. Avildsen declined to direct again because he was busy with pre-production on Saturday Night Fever. Stallone wanted the job and waged as big a campaign as he had for the lead role in the previous film. United Artists executives were reluctant to give the actor the directing reins because, while he had previously directed the drama Paradise Alley, it was not a success. However, producers Irwin Winkler and Robert Chartoff understood how much of the success of the first Rocky had come from Stallone's enormous input and lobbied hard to get him the job. Stallone wanted boxer Chuck Wepner to play Rocky's sparring partner, but Wepner was in a destructive cycle and failed his audition.

=== Filming ===
The story development of Rocky switching back to fighting left-handed at the end of the match was not in the original script and only came about because of an accident on set. While getting in shape for the film, Stallone experienced an almost complete tear on his right pectoralis major muscle while trying to bench press 100 kg with bodybuilder Franco Columbu and underwent a partially successful surgery in order to try to reattach the muscle. Therefore, he could not fight with his right hand any longer.

The film's ending fight sequence also posed a challenge because at the time Talia Shire was busy making the drama Old Boyfriends and couldn't be on the set. So Stallone came up with the idea of having her watch the fight from home because of the new baby. Adrian's scenes were actually filmed some months later, toward the end of the shoot.

An estimated 800 school children were used as extras in the scene in which Rocky runs through Philadelphia and climbs the steps at the Philadelphia Museum of Art.

== Music ==
=== Soundtrack ===
Rocky II: Music by Bill Conti

Soundtrack album by Bill Conti
- Released: 1979
- Genres: Jazz-funk, Rock
- Length: 35:04
- Labels: United Artists Records – LP; EMI Manhattan Records – CD

Just as in the previous installment, Bill Conti composed the film's music. A soundtrack album containing Conti's score was released on August 25, 1979, and charted on the Billboard 200 for five consecutive weeks.

1. "Redemption" – 2:34
2. "Gonna Fly Now" – 2:35
3. "Conquest" – 4:42
4. "Vigil" – 6:31
5. "All of My Life" – 3:56
6. "Overture" – 8:38
7. "Two Kinds of Love" – 2:37
8. "All of My Life" – 2:27

Personnel

- Bill Conti – piano (1)
- Mike Lang – piano (8)
- David Duke – horn solo (4)
- Frank Stallone – vocals (7)
- DeEtta Little, Nelson Pigford – vocals (5)

==== Chart positions ====
Chart (1979)	Peak position
US Billboard 200	147

== Reception ==
=== Box office ===
Rocky II opened in 805 theatres and grossed $6,390,537 during its opening weekend, and $11 million in its first week, to rank number one at the US box office. It went on to gross $85,182,160 in the United States and Canada, and $200,182,160 worldwide. It finished in the top three highest-grossing films of 1979, in both the North American market and worldwide.

Rocky II returned to UA 75% of Rocky's rentals in the United States and Canada ($42 million vs. $56 million) when the rule of thumb at the time was that a sequel would only do 30% to 40% of the business of its predecessor.

=== Critical response ===
Rocky II holds a 70% approval rating on review aggregation website Rotten Tomatoes, based on 90 reviews. The site's consensus reads: "Rocky II is a movie that dares you to root again for the ultimate underdog—and succeeds due to an infectiously powerful climax." On Metacritic, the film has a weighted average score of 61 out of 100 based on nine critics, indicating "generally favorable reviews".

Janet Maslin of The New York Times wrote that the film "has a waxy feeling, and it never comes to life the way its predecessor did." Variety wrote, "In its boxing and training scenes Rocky II packs much of the punch the original did, complete with an exciting pugilistic finale that's even better than its predecessor. However, in an attempt to tell the new story—that of Rocky's adjustment to near-success and an attempt to live a non-boxing life—the plot tends to drag and the picture takes on a murky quality." Gene Siskel gave the film three-and-a-half stars out of four and wrote, "What is most remarkable about Rocky II is that it recalls so many scenes from the original film, which is only three years old and was shown on national television last fall, and yet—amazingly—it all works. Almost every bit of it." Charles Champlin of the Los Angeles Times wrote that "Rocky II does not merely exploit the original, it extends it logically and grippingly, preserving all the traits of character (and of movie character) that made Rocky I work so well—those notions that ordinary people are worth knowing about, that love is the surpassing emotion in our lives and that some things are worth struggling hard for, even if there may only be the honor of the struggle to show in the end." Gary Arnold of The Washington Post wrote that the film "slavishly repeats the plot of Rocky, achieving differentiation only in dubious forms: soap opera detours, delaying tactics and an ugly new mood of viciousness surrounding a rematch between the boxers."

=== Accolades ===
The film won Best Picture at the American Movie Awards and won the People's Choice Award for Favorite Motion Picture. Dre Rivas of Film.com included it in his list of top ten films of 1979.

== Sequel ==
A sequel titled Rocky III, was released in May 1982.

== Other media ==
=== Novelization ===
A novelization was published by Ballantine Books in 1979. Sylvester Stallone was credited as the author. The book is a first-person narrative told by Rocky himself.

=== Video games ===
In 1987, Rocky was released, based on the first four Rocky films. In 2002, another Rocky was released, based on the first five Rocky films. In 2004, Rocky Legends was released, based on the first four Rocky films.

== See also ==
- List of boxing films
- The Rocky 50k, an ultrarunning course visiting all the locations shown in Rocky's run through Philadelphia
