= Dan McQuade =

American journalist (1983–2026)

- Dan McQuade reading to his son, Simon
- Born: January 27, 1983; Philadelphia, Pennsylvania
- Died: January 28, 2026 (aged 43)
- Education: University of Pennsylvania
- Occupation: Journalist
- Spouse: Jan Cohen (m. 2019)

Dan McQuade (January 27, 1983 – January 28, 2026) was an American journalist and Philadelphia-based writer and community figure. He is best known for recording and reporting on a 2014 comedy performance by Hannibal Buress that referenced longstanding sexual assault allegations against Bill Cosby, a video that circulated widely online.

== Early life and education ==
McQuade was born in Philadelphia on January 27, 1983. His father was a sportswriter and his mother was a financial analyst. He graduated from the University of Pennsylvania in 2004 with a degree in journalism. McQuade was active on the school’s newspaper as sports editor, columnist, and managing editor of 34th Street Magazine. He won two Keystone Press Awards in college.

== Career ==
After college McQuade began his career as a freelance journalist, mainly blogging for the Philadelphia Weekly. His blog was titled "Philadelphia Will Do", a reference to a W. C. Fields line about the city's perceived inferiority.

Over the following decade he freelanced for numerous outlets. At Comcast.com he was a producer, editor, and writer, covering local sports. Other endeavors included writing for Sports Illustrated, The Village Voice, New York Magazine, and Philadelphia Magazine. At Philadelphia, he led the digital news operation and wrote a weekly blog. In 2013, he wrote a blog post attempting to map the route of Rocky's training run in Rocky II, which went viral and inspired the Rocky 50k ultrarunning event; he later credited the piece with launching his journalism career.

In 2017, he left the magazine and became a staff editor at Deadspin. He was part of mass resignations from the site in 2019 which occurred as a result of a mandate to publish only sports-related content. In 2020, he co-founded Defector Media with many other former Deadspin writers and worked for the site until his death.

=== Bill Cosby video ===
In October 2014, McQuade attended a performance by comedian Hannibal Buress at the Trocadero Theatre in Philadelphia. During the set, Buress referenced longstanding allegations that Bill Cosby had committed sexual assault, which at the time had received limited public attention. McQuade recorded part of the performance on his mobile phone and later published the video along with an accompanying article. The video spread widely online, contributing to renewed public attention to the sexual assault allegations against Cosby.

== Writing style ==
His writing was recognized for its quirky, humorous, and authoritative tone. He had a deep connection to Philadelphia, and wrote stories about "the tics and quirks and peculiarities that make Philadelphians Philadelphians," including hoagies, accents, and parking. His work often balanced coverage of serious social issues and politics with humor and insight.

== Personal life and death ==
In 2025, McQuade posted an account of his battle with cancer, a neuroendocrine tumor discovered in 2024. He died on January 28, 2026, one day after his 43rd birthday.

In 2019, McQuade married Jan Cohen, whom he met online, and they had one son.
