= Mickey Goldmill =

Fictional character created by Sylvester Stallone

Mickey Goldmill Mighty Mick
- Rocky character
- Burgess Meredith as Mickey Goldmill
- First appearance: Rocky (1976)
- Last appearance: Rocky Balboa (2006)
- Created by: Sylvester Stallone
- Portrayed by: Burgess Meredith

In-universe information
- Full name: Mickey Goldmill
- Nickname: Mighty Mick
- Occupation: Professional boxing trainer (formerly professional boxer)
- Religion: Judaism
- Nationality: American

Mickey Goldmill
Personal information
- Nationality: American
- Born: April 7, 1905
- Died: August 15, 1981 (aged 76) Philadelphia, Pennsylvania
- Height: 5 ft 6 in (1.68 m)
- Weight: Bantamweight

Boxing career

Mickey Goldmill is a fictional character created by Sylvester Stallone and portrayed by Burgess Meredith in the Rocky film series. Meredith was nominated for the Academy Award for Best Supporting Actor for his performance in the first film, as was his co-star Burt Young. The character's gravelly voice, intense demeanor and popular catchphrases helped make him highly recognizable as well as a common source of parody and satire in pop culture.

== Development ==
Mickey may be based on Charley Goldman. Both were bantamweights, Jewish, and have similarly-constructed names. In addition, Goldman was the boxing trainer of Rocky Marciano, on whom Rocky Balboa is largely based. Goldman trained Marciano in many ways similar to how Goldmill trained Balboa, such as tying their ankles together with string to teach them to spread their feet at the appropriate width. Goldman was (again like Goldmill) well known for making wise remarks (e.g. "A lot of people say Rocky [Marciano] don't look too good in there, but the guy on the ground don't look too good either.").

== Fictional biography ==
According to his memorial plaque, Mickey Goldmill was born on April 7, 1905, to a Jewish family. He boxed professionally from 1922 until 1947 and achieved great athletic success but never gained any measure of fame or material success. Mickey recalled that he once knocked his opponent, Ginny Russell, out of the ring the same day that Luis Firpo did the same to Jack Dempsey: September 14, 1923. He claimed that the reason his victory did not garner any media attention was that he did not have a manager, while Dempsey did. He retired in 1947, with a record of 72 wins, (70 by knockout) and 1 loss. In 1948 he opened a boxing gym in Philadelphia, Mighty Mick's Boxing, and began to train fighters.

There is an apparent continuity error on Mickey's actual birth year. In late 1975, he tells Rocky that he is 76 years old, which would have meant he was born in either 1898 or 1899; however, his memorial plaque in Rocky III says that he was born in 1905. It is possible that he lied about his age (stating that he was 23 when he was actually 17) to start boxing and kept up the pretense for the rest of his life.

=== Rocky ===
In the first film, Mickey manages his gym. One of the regulars is Rocky Balboa, a local club boxer who Mickey felt had the talent to be a good fighter, but Rocky instead became a collector for a local loan shark, Tony Gazzo. Mickey berates Rocky for his association with Gazzo, and evicts him from his locker at the gym, although deep down, Mickey still wants Rocky to fulfill his great potential.

When World Heavyweight Champion Apollo Creed gives Rocky an unlikely shot at the title, Mickey approaches him about being his manager. Based on their uneasy prior relationship, Rocky is initially reluctant, but after venting his frustrations, he agrees to let Mickey train him. The match takes place on January 1, 1976, at the Philadelphia Spectrum. While Rocky loses the match to Creed on points, he manages to last the full 15 rounds, a first for any of Creed's opponents.

=== Rocky II ===
Rocky II picks up directly after the first film. Apollo challenges Rocky to a rematch while the two are still in the hospital; Mickey states that, despite the decision of the judges, he felt Balboa won the match. Mickey later attends Rocky and Adrian's wedding, before returning to running his gym. Later, after Apollo publicly goads Rocky into a second fight, Mickey again becomes Rocky's trainer. For the second fight with a now-determined Apollo, Mickey utilizes old-school training methods (such as chasing and attempting to catch a chicken) to help Rocky gain speed. He also converts Rocky from a left-handed fighting style to a right-handed style, in an effort to both confuse Apollo and to protect his right eye in which had suffered a detached retina during the previous match.

After Rocky's wife, Adrian, falls into a coma after giving birth to their son, Mickey stays by Rocky's side until she regains consciousness. Rocky quickly gets into shape under Mickey's guidance, and although Creed dominates the rematch, Rocky knocks Creed down in the 15th and final round, but also falls down himself. With Mickey urging him to get back up, Rocky beats the count to get back to his feet and win the title.

=== Rocky III ===
By the start of Rocky III, set almost five years after Rocky won the championship, Mickey has trained Rocky to a series of ten successful title defenses. Mickey, now living with the Balboas in a mansion outside of Philadelphia, is suffering heart problems by this time (though he keeps this hidden from Rocky).

As Rocky announce his plans to retire at the unveiling of a statue at the Philadelphia Museum of Art, the number one challenger to Rocky's title, James "Clubber" Lang accuses Rocky of avoiding him, publicly taunting Rocky and making lascivious remarks to his wife Adrian. Rocky agrees to face Clubber in what he believes will be his last title defense. Mickey refuses to train Rocky against Clubber, admitting that all of his challengers were hand-picked, "good fighters" but not "killers" like Clubber. He states that Rocky, when he fought Apollo, was "supernatural", "hard", "nasty" and had a "cast-iron jaw", but has now gotten "civilized" and lost the hunger that allowed him to win. Rocky's confidence in himself is shaken greatly, making him even more eager to accept the challenge in order to prove himself; he convinces Mickey to still train him, with the promise that this would be their last match.

Rocky, much to Mickey's frustration, does not take his training seriously, allowing his fans to watch him train in a crowded hotel ballroom filled with distractions. Shortly before the match, Rocky and Clubber's entourages erupt into a pandemonium free-for-all backstage; Mickey, trying to break it up, is shoved by Clubber, and suffers a cardiac arrest. Rocky attempts to call off the match due to Mickey's condition, but he refuses to allow Rocky to cancel the fight. His condition worsens as the match goes on, but Mickey refuses to go to the hospital until the match is over, receiving CPR. Rocky, still distraught over Mickey's condition, is not fully focused on the match and is quickly overpowered by Lang, losing the title via a brutal second round knockout.

Rocky hurries back to the dressing room to check on Mickey's condition, and tells him that the fight ended in a second-round knockout, but does not tell Mickey that he lost. Mickey utters his last words to Rocky, being "I love you, kid", before dying, devastating Rocky. Mickey is interred in a Jewish mausoleum outside of Philadelphia, in a private service attended by Rocky, his wife Adrian, his brother-in-law Paulie and Goldmill's long-time friend and cornerman Al Silvani.

Rocky, after having finished grieving Mickey, later defeats Clubber in a rematch with the help of his former nemesis Apollo Creed and Apollo's trainer Tony "Duke" Evers.

=== Rocky V ===
Mickey Goldmill reappears in the fifth installment, in a flashback to before Rocky's fight with Apollo, where he gives Rocky one last motivational speech before the match. He also gives Rocky a cufflink that belonged to Rocky Marciano as a gesture of gratitude for giving him newfound purpose, promises he'll always be with him after he dies and, should Rocky get hurt, to use his words to motivate himself to get back up.

It is revealed that in his will, Mickey left his gym to Rocky's son, Robert Balboa Jr. When Rocky loses his fortune because of a tax discrepancy the gym remains the only asset he owns and, to earn income, Rocky opens the gym once again.

When Rocky gets into a street fight with his former protégé Tommy Gunn, he hallucinates Mickey telling him to get up, motivating Rocky to win the fight against Tommy. At the film's climax Rocky gives Robert the same cufflink Mickey gave him.

This was the last time Burgess Meredith appeared without the use of archival footage, as he died on September 9, 1997.

== Video games ==
Mickey appears in the video games Rocky, Rocky Legends and the mobile game ROCKY, offering advice to the player in between rounds. In Rocky Legends, the player earns money for winning fights, which can be then be used to buy venues or unlock boxers. One such boxer is a younger Mickey Goldmill when he was in active boxing, before he turned to managing.
