= Rocky Legends =

2004 video game

- Developer: Venom Games
- Publisher: Ubisoft (Note: Co-published with MGM Interactive.)
- Platforms: PlayStation 2, Xbox
- Release: NA: September 28, 2004; UK: October 1, 2004; AU: October 7, 2004
- Genre: Fighting
- Modes: Single-player, multiplayer

Rocky Legends is a 2004 fighting video game developed by Venom Games and published by Ubisoft. It is the sequel to the 2002 video game Rocky. The game is based on the Rocky franchise.

The events of the game take place before the films and in between. In the game the player can take control of Rocky Balboa, Apollo Creed, Clubber Lang or Ivan Drago and witness their early careers before their famous encounters.

== Gameplay ==
Rocky Legends has six different gameplay modes to choose from including Career, Exhibition, Tournament, Survival, Training, and Practice. Players can also use their in-game winnings to buy and unlock extras.

=== Career ===
Career mode allows the player to select one of the major characters of the first four Rocky films. Each character has a story of how they rise to the top of the boxing world. They all remain true to the canon of the Rocky films except for Ivan Drago's story, which differs in the match against Rocky Balboa.

- Rocky Balboa: Rocky's story begins outside of Mickey's gym, where Rocky has a street fight with Joe Zale. The story then progresses through all of the Rocky movies, ending with Rocky's street fight against Tommy Gunn.
- Apollo Creed: Apollo's story gives us a backstory to Apollo before his fight with Rocky Balboa. The story begins during a match between Apollo and his best friend Tony "Duke" Evers. Apollo beats Duke, and Duke tells Apollo that he is getting ready to retire and would like to be Apollo's manager. Apollo agrees and the story leads into Apollo's rise to the championship, finishing just before Rocky's rise to fame.
- James "Clubber" Lang: Clubber Lang's story starts in the Chicago state prison, where he gets into a brawl with another inmate. After the fight the guards tell Lang that he served his time and he is let go. The story then revolves around the events of Rocky III and culminates in his victory over Rocky in New York City.
- Ivan Drago: Ivan Drago's story is the only one that steps away from the canon of the Rocky films. Drago's story revolves around the events of Rocky IV and his rise to fame in Russia. This career mode has a twist: not only does Drago beat Apollo, he also defeats Rocky and it ends with Drago receiving a medal from the Soviet Union.

=== Training ===
A training mode is included in Rocky Legends. Training can be done in freeplay or career. While training in career mode awards the player points to upgrade their character based on how well they trained. This gives the player a chance to change how the stars of Rocky fought as the player is allowed to decide which stats to raise. Training in freeplay can be done both alone and with another player competitively, however this has no effect on the character's stats.

== Reception ==
Reception

Aggregate scores
Aggregator	Score
GameRankings	(Xbox) 73% (PS2) 69.47%
Metacritic	(Xbox) 67/100 (PS2) 65/100

Review scores
Publication	Score
Edge	6/10
Eurogamer	7/10
Game Informer	6.5/10
GameRevolution	C
GameSpot	6.8/10
GameSpy	3.5/5
GameZone	7.5/10
IGN	7.1/10
Official U.S. PlayStation Magazine	2.5/5
Official Xbox Magazine (US)	6.6/10

The game was met with average reception upon release. GameRankings and Metacritic gave it a score of 73% and 67 out of 100 for the Xbox version, and 69.47% and 65 out of 100 for the PlayStation 2 version.

Character models and arenas created for this game were adapted for use in the PSP game Rocky Balboa.
