= Rocky 50k =

Philadelphia ultrarunning event

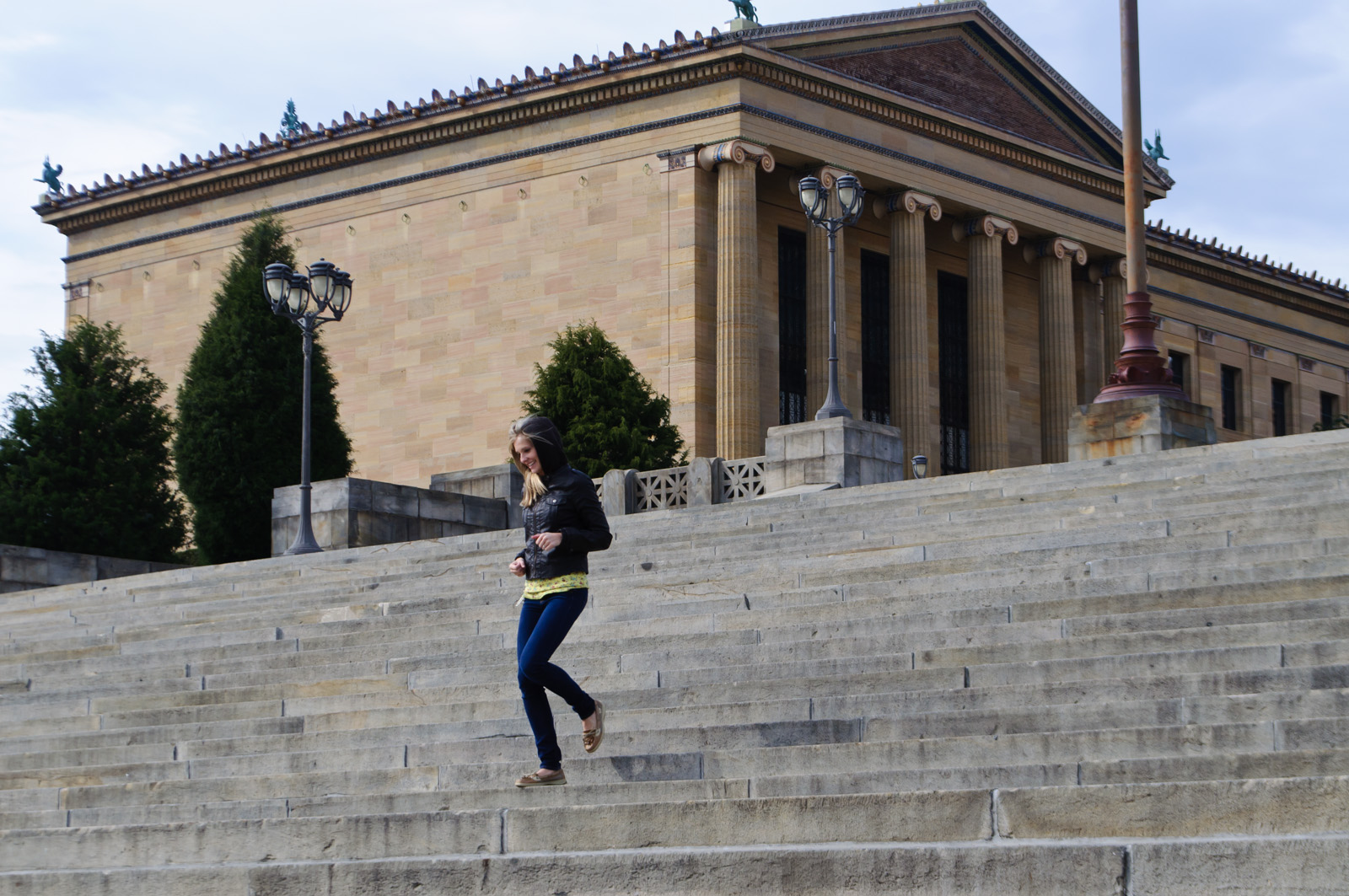
Like the montage, the course ends at the Rocky Steps at the Philadelphia Museum of Art.

The Rocky 50k Fat Ass Run is a fifty-kilometer ultrarunning event held in Philadelphia every winter. As a Fat Ass event, it is not formally agreed with the city, and has no road closures, marshals, prizes, or amenities such as aid stations. It was sparked by an October 2013 magazine article attempting to map the route of Rocky Balboa's training run montage in Rocky II: a local ultrarunner saw the article and was inspired to put on the first Rocky 50k in December of the same year.

== Founding ==
In 2013, journalist Dan McQuade published a humor piece for Philadelphia magazine imagining what route Rocky Balboa would have to have taken for all the locations seen in the Rocky II training montage - which in real life are widely spaced around the city - to appear in the order the film shows them. (A cameraman on the film, Garrett Brown, later confirmed that the montage was not intended to show a real route.) McQuade's theoretical route was 30.61 miles long, which he noted in the piece was only a little short of 50 kilometers. Local ultrarunner Rebecca Barber (then Schaefer) saw the piece and emailed McQuade the same day to propose putting on an informal 50k race using the route, but guessed that it would have limited appeal and would "be small, for sure".

The inaugural race was held on December 7, 2013, and in the event attracted about 150 people - many more than Barber expected - including many in Rocky costumes. There was no entry fee, but Barber requested donations of running shoes for the charity Back on My Feet. It was covered by the Wall Street Journal (on the front page), CBS, and Runner's World. One participant found out after the race that she was pregnant, and named her baby Rocky in honour of the event.

As of 2023 it had taken place every December since its founding year and drawn runners from around the world. McQuade called it "a small, strange part of Philadelphia's civic life". Peter Sagal called the run "much closer to the spirit of Rocky" than officially licensed events.

== Later Rocky-themed races ==
In 2014 Barber received a cease and desist from MGM, the studio with rights to the Rocky franchise, citing copyright infringement and demanding that she stop using the Rocky name and any references to the films. She originally planned to crowdsource a new name, but in the event changed the logo and added a line to the website saying that the run had no affiliation with MGM, without changing the name.

The same year, Cerulean Sports Group (later Run MFG) announced an officially licensed "Rocky Run" in partnership with MGM. The official Rocky Run does not visit all the locations used in the films - it stops at, but does not go up, the Rocky Steps - and is considerably shorter; organisers have cited the difficulty and cost of closing major roads as a reason why the route does not match the film. The distance has varied but as of 2026 the race offered 5km and 10 mile distances, which can be combined for a half marathon.

In 2023, running influencer Jon Cervi announced a 22-mile run aiming to "retrace Rocky's footsteps" in partnership with the Endorphins Running platform, without credit to the Rocky 50k; he later said he had not heard of the earlier event and had not intended to steal the idea. The run took place but did not become a repeat event.
