= Statue of Rocky Balboa (Žitište) =

Statue of movie character

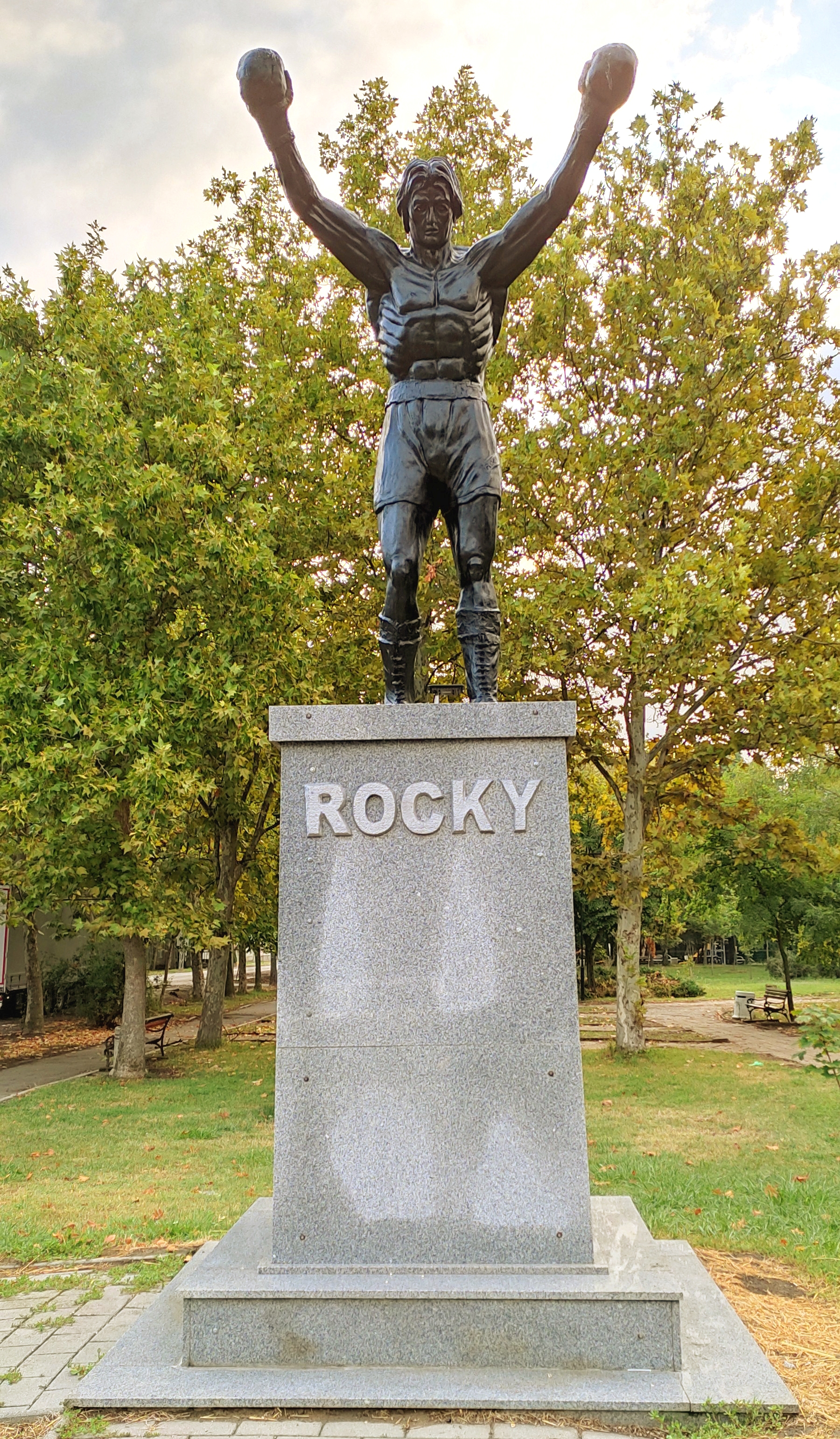
- Artist: Boris Staparac
- Year: 2007
- Medium: Bronze statue
- Subject: Sylvester Stallone as Rocky Balboa
- Location: Žitište, Vojvodina, Serbia; 45°28′59″N 20°33′09″E

The Statue of Rocky Balboa (Serbian: Статуа Рокија Балбое, romanized: Statua Rokija Balboe) is a bronze statue in Žitište, Serbia, dedicated to Rocky Balboa, the main character from the 1976 American sports drama film Rocky, portrayed by Sylvester Stallone. It was made by Croatian artist Boris Staparac and erected in 2007. It is located at the west end of the Maly Park ('little park'), south of the Church of Saint George.

The project was lobbied for by "The Rocky Balboa Citizens Association", a group of younger Rocky fans. The project required approval from A. Thomas Schomberg, who made the famous Rocky statue in Philadelphia, before it could move ahead.

The statue was the subject of Amerika Idol, a 2009 documentary film by Canadian director Barry Avrich which depicts the events that preceded the creation of the statue, as well as the ceremony of its installation. The film also features appearances from Stallone and Schomberg.

In 2011 the Lonely Planet guide included the monument to Rocky Balboa in Žitište in its list of the "top 10 most bizarre monuments on Earth", along with Equestrian statue of the Duke of Wellington, Glasgow and the Washington National Cathedral in the United States.

== See also ==
- Rocky Steps
