= Clubber Lang =

Fictional character from the Rocky films

Clubber Lang The Southside Slugger
- Rocky character
- Mr. T as James "Clubber" Lang
- First appearance: Rocky III (1982)
- Last appearance: Big Rumble Boxing: Creed Champions (2021)
- Created by: Sylvester Stallone
- Portrayed by: Mr. T

In-universe information
- Full name: James Lang
- Nickname: Clubber
- Title: World Heavyweight Champion
- Occupation: Professional boxer
- Nationality: American

Clubber Lang
Personal information
- Nationality: American
- Born: April 4, 1954 (age 72) Chicago, Illinois, U.S.
- Height: 6 ft 1 in (1.85 m)
- Weight: 237 lb (108 kg)

Boxing career
- Stance: Southpaw

Boxing record
- Total fights: 90
- Wins: 88
- Win by KO: 88
- Losses: 2
- Draws: 0

James "Clubber" Lang is a fictional character created by Sylvester Stallone for the film Rocky III, which was released in 1982. He was portrayed by American actor and real-life wrestler Mr. T and serves as the main antagonist of the film.

Lang is a professional boxer from Chicago, Illinois, and is a one-time world heavyweight champion, having taken the title from Rocky Balboa only to lose it back to Balboa in his next fight. The character is very loosely based on a combination of Sonny Liston, Larry Holmes, and George Foreman.

== Fictional character biography ==
James Lang lost both of his parents at an early age, and spent most of his childhood in orphanages and on the streets of Chicago's Southside; he eventually became involved with crime, and served time in juvenile facilities. Later, as an adult, Clubber was sent to prison for five years for felony aggravated assault. During his time in prison, he discovered boxing as a way to let out his frustration and anger, which leads to the events of Rocky III. This is also evident in the game Rocky Legends, where Clubber's storyline begins with him fighting in the Chicago Prison in a ring actually inside the prison itself.

=== Rocky III ===
During Rocky III's intro, Rocky is shown easily defeating numerous contenders in a montage, during which Lang is shown annoyed at Rocky apparently coasting through his title defenses. Lang decides to begin training himself to challenge Rocky and his methods bring results as he puts together a string of knockouts that soon make him the number one contender. Lang attends a charity exhibition match between Rocky and the professional wrestler, Thunderlips, but gets up and leaves in disgust shortly before the match ends. He appears at a public event to goad a now-complacent Rocky who is announcing his retirement. Lang finally infuriates Rocky by propositioning his wife Adrian in front of Rocky's numerous fans and the television media, and Rocky agrees to fight him.

Rocky expects another easy victory and continues his complacent attitude towards training, which angers and worries his manager and trainer Mickey Goldmill. Meanwhile, Lang makes no such assumptions and relentlessly trains with fiercely disciplined intensity for the bout. On the night of the fight, Lang taunts the champion in the hallway as they are walking to the ring and provokes a scuffle between the two camps, shoving Mickey so hard that the latter suffers a heart attack which further distracts Rocky from the fight (and later proves fatal). He also angers former champion Apollo Creed by refusing to shake his hand before the fight and mocking him as a "has-been". Creed tells Balboa, "Give everybody a present and drop this chump." Lang overwhelms Rocky and knocks him out in two rounds, winning the title easily.

Lang's first defense of his newly won title is a rematch against Rocky. Before the fight, Lang is interviewed and mocks Balboa as no challenge. When he is informed Creed is training Balboa and will be in his corner, Lang mocks Creed and says it does not matter. Balboa has learned a newer boxing style based on speed and finesse from Creed. Shortly before the fight, Lang mocks Creed again and even shoves him, nearly starting a brawl. The champion has trouble with Rocky's new technique and soon tires after becoming enraged and throwing a large number of wild hooks, attempting to knock Rocky out quickly. Although several punches are damaging, Balboa taunts Lang by saying "knock me out, champ" and claiming the resulting punches were "nothing", further enraging Lang who continues to swing wildly. Rocky exploits his opponent's exhaustion and knocks him out in the third round.

Preceded by Rocky Balboa	World Heavyweight Champion; August 15, 1981 – July 6, 1982	Succeeded by Rocky Balboa
