= A. Thomas Schomberg =

American sculptor

Auldwin Thomas Schomberg (born 1943) is an American sculptor whose career has spanned more than five decades, best known for his athletic and memorial sculptures. He has described portraying, with his realistic intensity, the time and environment in which he lives and the society in which we are all captives.

== Background ==
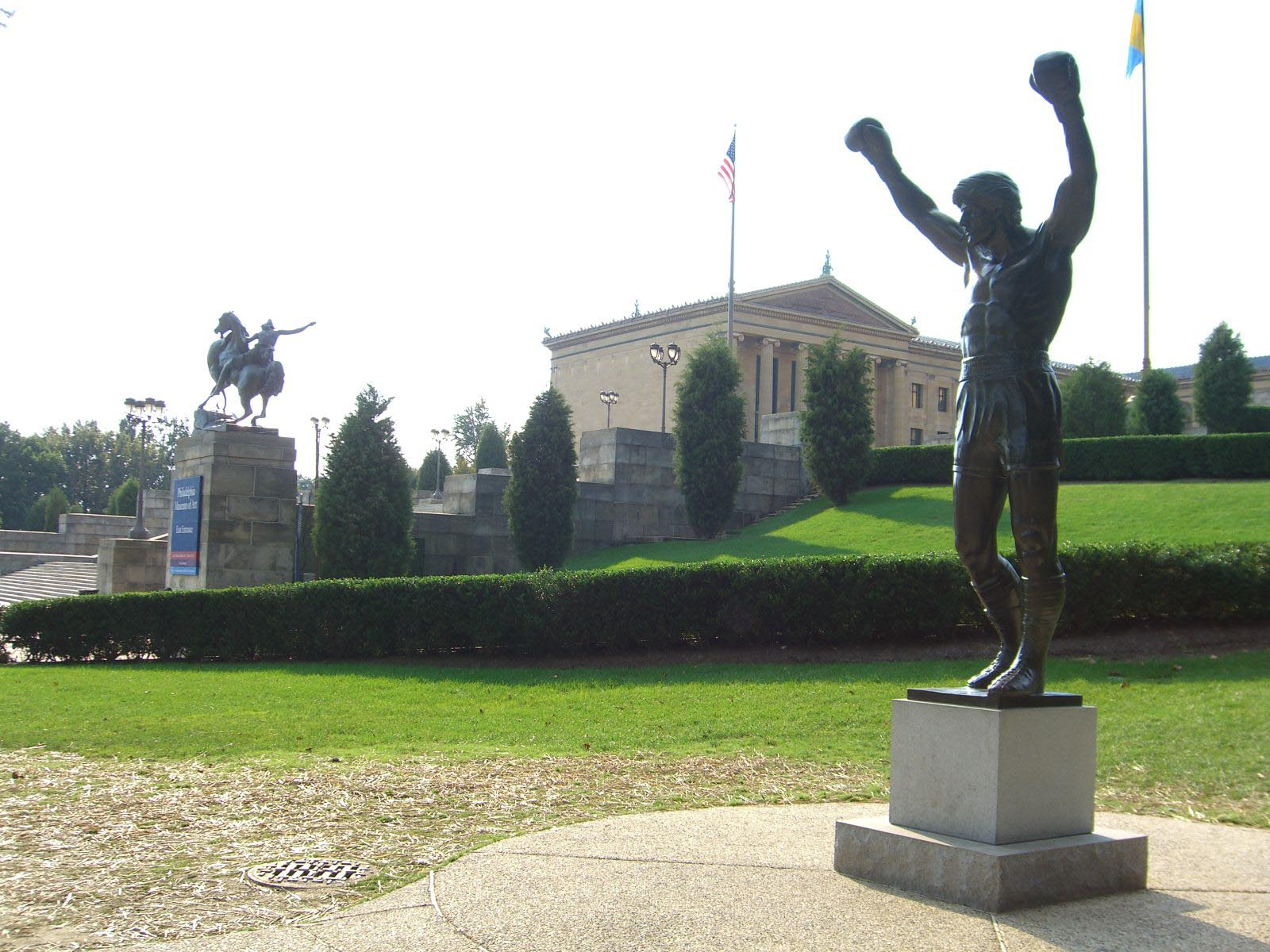
Rocky statue, situated just northeast of the Rocky Steps

A. Thomas Schomberg grew up in Sioux City, Iowa, during the late 1940s and 1950s. He graduated from Nebraska's Wayne State College in 1964. After completing his formal public education, he taught for a short time in Omaha, Nebraska. Upon completing MA and MFA degrees, as well as studying in Europe, Schomberg moved to the east coast and taught for a short time in a progressive community college. Although he received tenure, he felt compelled to relocate to Colorado in 1975 and established Schomberg Studios with his wife, Cynthia, who is also his agent.

Schomberg's sculptures have become world-renowned and are exhibited and collected internationally. Numbered among his early collectors was Sylvester Stallone, who later commissioned Schomberg to create what became the iconic Rocky Balboa statue for the movie, Rocky III (1982). Three 2-ton, 10-foot statues were cast; one has been permanently installed at the steps of the Philadelphia Museum of Art. His daughter Robin manages the Rocky Statue reproduction line. In 1987, Sports Illustrated described Schomberg as "perhaps the best known sports sculptor working today".

== Major works ==
A. Thomas Schomberg's work can be found in the permanent collections of the National Art Museum of Sport, Indianapolis, Indiana; the Philadelphia Museum of Art, Philadelphia, Pennsylvania; the Butler Institute of American Art, Youngstown, Ohio; the Shenyang National Gallery, Beijing, China; the United States Olympic Training Center, Colorado Springs, Colorado; the International Volleyball Headquarters, Lausanne, Switzerland; the Riverside National Cemetery, Riverside, California; March Airforce Base Museum, Riverside, California; Yankee Stadium, New York, New York; the Astrodome, Houston, Texas; the Superdome, New Orleans, Louisiana; the new Olympic Center, Warsaw, Poland; The National Museum of the Marine Corps, Quantico, Virginia, the Detroit Athletic Club, Detroit, Michigan; Brookgreen Gardens, Murrell's Inlet, South Carolina; and many other public and private locations.

From 2001 to 2021, Schomberg created a major series of work, which consists of a number of figurative columns capturing poignant "vignettes of emotion" from the September 11 attacks. Throughout those 20 years, while creating The 9/11 Series, Schomberg also continued to create a number of monumental athletic and memorial sculptures.

== Monumental sculptures ==
- The FINISH, 6.4.3, RUNNING BACK and THE START -FEMALE, 1.5 life size statues to commemorate the 100th Anniversary of the Detroit Athletic Club, Detroit, MI.
- The statue ROCKY created for the movie Rocky III - three bronze statues; on the grounds of the Philadelphia Museum of Art, Philadelphia, PA; the Private Collection of Sylvester Stallone; inside Terminal A West, Philadelphia International Airport.
- DOWN BUT NOT OUT...LOST BUT NOT FORGOTTEN created for the International Amateur Boxing Association in memory of the American team killed in a 1980 airplane crash; the United States Olympic Training Center, Colorado Springs, CO; the new Olympic Center, Warsaw, Poland.
- ATHLETES OF RACE– PRIMITIVE and ATHLETES OF RACE – MODERN, six larger than life equestrian statues; the Garden State Race Track, Cherry Hill, NJ; Due Process Farms, Colts Neck, NJ; Cloverleaf Farms, Ocala, FL.
- FLO HYMAN, a memorial to the volleyball Olympian; the Volleyball Hall of Fame, Holyoke, MA; United States Olympic Training Center, Colorado Springs, CO; the Daiei Corporation, Osaka, Japan; the International Volleyball Headquarters, Lausanne, Switzerland.
- The VETERANS MEMORIAL, a somber and emotional description of a fallen soldier wrapped in a tarpaulin, measuring 12 feet high; Church of the Holy Ghost, Denver, CO; National Museum of the Marine Corp in Quantico, VA; Riverside National Military Cemetery, Riverside, CA.
- The ARMENIAN MEMORIAL, a 24 foot monolith that is a description of a country's tragedy; installation to be announced.
- The WAR DOG MEMORIAL, an 18 foot column and relief of a soldier and dog dedicated to the war dog efforts during the Vietnam War; March Airfield Museum, Riverside, CA; Sacrifice Field, Fort Benning, GA; Rhode Island Veterans Memorial Cemetery, Exeter, RI.

== Future installations ==
- The CARYATIDS and THE START-FEMALE have been proposed to be added to the permanent collection of the Brookgreen Sculpture Gardens and Museum, Myrtle Beach, SC.
- THE GIFT is meant to commemorate the Nation's gratitude to the American Indian for over 200 years of military service, and to symbolize the sacrifices the American Indian endured throughout history. Future installation will be at Riverside National Cemetery, Riverside, CA.
- THE 9/11 SERIES: Exhibitions at Brookgreen Sculpture Garden, Murrell's Inlet, SC.
