= Rocky III =

1982 film by Sylvester Stallone

- Theatrical release poster
- Directed by: Sylvester Stallone
- Written by: Sylvester Stallone
- Produced by: Irwin Winkler; Robert Chartoff
- Starring: Sylvester Stallone; Talia Shire; Burt Young; Carl Weathers; Burgess Meredith; Mr. T
- Cinematography: Bill Butler
- Edited by: Don Zimmerman; Mark Warner
- Music by: Bill Conti
- Production companies: United Artists; Chartoff-Winkler Productions
- Distributed by: MGM/UA Entertainment Co.
- Release date: May 28, 1982 (United States)
- Running time: 100 minutes
- Country: United States
- Language: English
- Budget: $17 million
- Box office: $270 million

Rocky III is a 1982 American sports drama film written, directed by, and starring Sylvester Stallone. The film is the sequel to Rocky II (1979) and the third installment in the Rocky franchise. It also stars Talia Shire, Burt Young, Carl Weathers and Burgess Meredith. In the film, Rocky Balboa (Stallone) faces stiff competition from Clubber Lang (Mr. T), a powerful new contender, and turns to his old adversary Apollo Creed (Weathers) to help him train.

Development of a third Rocky film began during the making of Rocky II. Stallone began a strict diet and workout regimen in preparation. Despite the returns of the original cast being secured quickly, casting for Lang proved difficult, with real boxers Joe Frazier and Ernie Shavers attached to the project at various points. Mr. T was hired in 1981 after appearing on the television series Games People Play, and the film is considered his breakthrough role. Rocky III is the first film in the franchise not solely distributed by United Artists, due to the company's merger with Metro-Goldwyn-Mayer (MGM) in 1981.

Rocky III was released in the United States on May 28, 1982, by MGM/UA Entertainment Co. The film received mixed reviews from critics, with praise for its action sequences and music, but criticism for its screenplay, with some critics deeming the film unnecessary. Retrospective reviews have been more positive and the movie gained a strong cult following. Rocky III grossed $270 million worldwide, surpassing its predecessors to become the then-highest-grossing film in the franchise, and the fourth-highest-grossing film at the domestic box office and the second-highest-grossing film of 1982 worldwide. Its theme song, "Eye of the Tiger", became a hit single and received a nomination for Best Original Song at the 55th Academy Awards. A sequel, Rocky IV, was released in 1985.

== Plot ==
In 1981, 5 years after winning the world heavyweight championship against Apollo Creed, (Note: As depicted in Rocky II (1979).) Rocky Balboa has had a string of ten successful title defenses, and his fame, wealth, and celebrity profile have increased. Rocky's manager, Mickey Goldmill, worriedly eyes a young and powerful contender rapidly rising through the ranks, James "Clubber" Lang. While unveiling a statue of himself at the stairway by the Philadelphia Museum of Art, Rocky begins to announce his retirement, but is cut short when Lang, now the number-one contender, publicly challenges him. Lang accuses Rocky of intentionally accepting challenges from lesser opponents, and goads Rocky into accepting his fight for the title.

Mickey initially wants no part of it; pressed by Rocky, Mickey confesses that he handpicked the opponents for Rocky's title defenses to spare him from another beating of the kind that Apollo gave him in their rematch. He explains that Lang is young, powerful and "hungry"; by contrast, Rocky is "civilized" and no longer has the stamina and strength to fight a boxer of Lang's caliber. Mickey tries to talk Rocky out of the fight but Rocky, shattered by the realization that all of his fights have been stacked in his favor, convinces Mickey to work with him for one last bout. Despite his promise to Mickey to "live in the gym", Rocky insists on allowing the public to watch him train in a crowded hotel ballroom filled with distractions. In contrast, Lang trains alone with ruthless determination and vigor.

Lang and Rocky meet at Philadelphia's Spectrum on August 15, 1981. Pandemonium erupts backstage as Mickey is violently shoved by Lang, resulting in a heart attack due to an underlying heart condition evidenced during Rocky's charity fight with pro wrestler Thunderlips. Distraught, Rocky wants to call the match off, but Mickey urges him on while he receives medical care in the dressing room. Rocky's lack of preparation is worsened by his concern for Mickey, preventing him from fully concentrating on the fight. The match begins with Rocky pounding Lang with several huge blows, looking for an early knockout, but Lang quickly recovers and takes charge, dominating Rocky and finishing him off with a haymaker left hook in the second round, winning the world heavyweight championship. After the match, Rocky tells a dying Mickey that the match ended in a second-round knockout without saying who the victor was. Mickey tells Rocky, "I love ya, kid", and dies. Rocky, lapsing into severe depression, mourns over Mickey's death.

Stopping by Mickey's closed gym, the forlorn Rocky encounters his former rival Apollo, who witnessed the match as a guest analyst. Apollo offers to help train Rocky for a rematch against Lang in exchange for a future favor, which Rocky accepts. Apollo then takes Rocky to the gym where he once trained, Tough Gym in Los Angeles. Apollo becomes frustrated by Rocky's lack of effort, as the latter is still haunted by nightmares of Lang and unable to train without Mickey by his side. Rocky regains his focus, though, after Adrian helps him come to terms with Mickey's death. Apollo and his manager, Tony "Duke" Evers, infuse Rocky's undisciplined brawling style with more of Apollo's trademark footwork, skill, and speed, rebuilding him into a more complete fighter.

After months of training, the rematch takes place at Madison Square Garden in New York City. Apollo lends Rocky the American flag trunks that he wore during their first match. At the outset of the match, Rocky sprints from his corner, battering Lang with a level of skill and spirit that no one ever expected. Rocky completely dominates the first round, leaving Lang enraged and bewildered after the bell. Lang gains the upper hand in the second round, and Rocky adopts an entirely different strategy that angers and confuses Apollo by intentionally taking a beating from Lang, even getting knocked down twice, all the while taunting Lang that he cannot knock him out. By the third round, Lang, who is used to winning matches swiftly with knockouts in the early rounds, loses his temper and starts throwing punches wildly as Rocky taunts him and Lang gradually runs out of stamina. With Lang rattled and vulnerable, Rocky strikes back with a flurry of punches, culminating in a brutal knockout to reclaim the heavyweight championship.

Afterward, Rocky honors Apollo's favor: a third match, albeit this time in the form of a friendly sparring match at Mighty Mick's Gym. The film concludes with the two simultaneously throwing the first punch, showing two equally skilled athletes facing each other not as rivals, but as friends. (Note: It was confirmed in the movie Creed that Apollo "won" the fight.)

== Cast ==
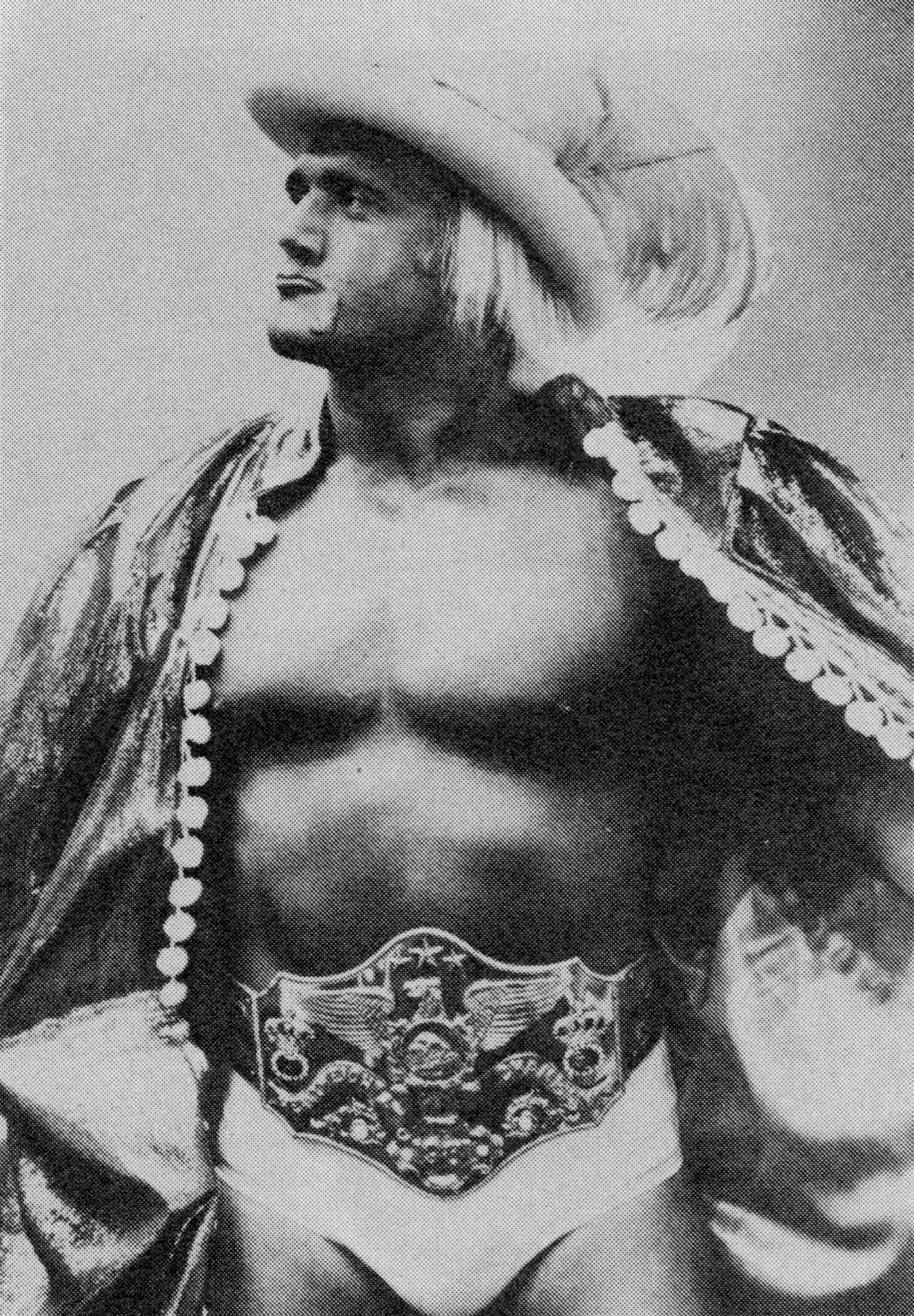
Hulk Hogan in character as Thunderlips

- Sylvester Stallone as Robert "Rocky" Balboa, "the Italian Stallion", and current heavyweight champion of the world. Shattered by the death of his trainer Mickey Goldmill, and the loss of his title to Clubber Lang, Rocky is forced to start from scratch, training under his old adversary Apollo Creed in preparation for a rematch.
- Talia Shire as Adrian Pennino Balboa, Rocky's wife and supporter throughout his boxing career.
- Burt Young as Paulie Pennino, Rocky's best friend, brother-in-law, and cornerman.
- Carl Weathers as Apollo Creed, the former heavyweight champion and Rocky's former arch-rival, who agrees to train him after the death of Mickey. In the process, the two become very close friends.
- Burgess Meredith as Michael "Mickey" Goldmill, Rocky's friend, manager, and trainer, who unexpectedly dies; he is a former bantamweight fighter from the 1920s and the owner of the boxing gym where Rocky trained for his first fight against Apollo.
- Tony Burton as Tony "Duke" Evers, Apollo Creed's father figure, friend, trainer, and manager, who helps Apollo train Rocky.
- Mr. T as James "Clubber" Lang, the underdog challenger who beats Rocky in a championship fight, amid Mickey's unexpected death. The public's general dislike and lack of respect for him as the heavyweight champion of the world leads to a rematch with Rocky. Orphaned at an early age, Lang spent most of his childhood on the streets of Chicago's South Side, along with time in orphanages and juvenile facilities. As an adult, Lang was sent to prison for five years for one count of a felony assault charge. While serving his sentence, he discovered his talent as a boxer. Boxing was a way to let out his frustration, which led to the events of Rocky III.
- Ina Fried as Robert "Rocky" Balboa, Jr., Rocky and Adrian's only child.
- Hulk Hogan as Thunderlips, the current world wrestling champion, who fights Rocky in an exhibition charity event.

In addition to the main cast, several others had cameo appearances. Bill Baldwin and Stu Nahan returned as the fight commentators for the two Rocky-Lang fights. Veteran ring announcer Jimmy Lennon was the ring announcer for the first Lang fight, while boxing judge Marty Denkin was the referee. Lou Filippo returned for his third appearance as a referee during the second Lang fight. Wally Taylor played Lang's manager. Dennis James (The Price Is Right) and Jim Healy appeared as the commentators for the Rocky–Thunderlips match, while LeRoy Neiman was the guest ring announcer. Jim Hill was a TV announcer. Footage of Stallone's guest appearance on The Muppet Show was incorporated in the opening sequence, with Jim Henson dubbing Kermit the Frog's announcement that the episode's guest was Rocky Balboa, rather than Stallone.

== Production ==
=== Development ===
After Rocky won the Academy Award for Best Picture, Stallone said that he wanted to make several more Rocky films and announced that he was planning to make Rocky II and Rocky III back-to-back as a trilogy due to his legs "going". During the making of Rocky II, Stallone began developing the third installment that would explore the challenges of fame and complacency. The narrative arc was designed to show Rocky Balboa no longer as the underdog, but as a world champion dealing with the psychological and physical consequences of success. The go-ahead to start production in 1980 was given in March 1979 and plans to develop it progressed after successful preview screenings of Rocky II in May and June 1979. Stallone returned as writer and director, aiming to bring a more stylized and commercially dynamic tone to the series.

=== Casting ===
For the role of Clubber Lang, two world-class heavyweight boxers—Joe Frazier and Earnie Shavers—were initially considered. Both matched Stallone in height and physique, but were ultimately rejected due to vocal concerns: Frazier reportedly had a stutter, and Shavers had a high-pitched voice deemed unsuitable for the character's menacing persona. Casting director Rhonda Young discovered Mr. T on NBC's Games People Play, in an episode depicting a competition of "America's Toughest Bouncer", a program that showcased his physicality and charisma. She contacted producer Don Ohlmeyer about "the man with the mohawk", and Mr. T was subsequently cast. His presence and performance in screen tests secured the role, marking his breakout in film. Terry Funk, a professional wrestler who did stunts for the film, would recommend Hulk Hogan to Stallone for the role as the film's wrestler Thunderlips; Funk had also previously had a role in the 1978 Stallone film Paradise Alley. A then-unknown Morgan Freeman auditioned unsuccessfully for the role of Lang's manager, who was played by Wally Taylor.

=== Filming ===
To portray a leaner and more defined version of Rocky Balboa, Stallone adopted an extreme physical regimen. He claimed to have reduced his body fat percentage to 2.6% and brought his weight down to about 155 pounds (70 kg). His strict diet consisted primarily of 10 egg whites and a piece of toast daily, with fruit only every third day. His training schedule included a morning jog, two hours of weightlifting, 18 rounds of sparring, an additional weight session in the afternoon, and swimming in the evening.

== Music ==
=== Soundtrack ===
This soundtrack is the third in the series composed by Bill Conti and features the single "Eye of the Tiger" by Survivor. Stallone enlisted Survivor after Queen denied him permission to use their song "Another One Bites the Dust". Survivor derived lyrics and title from dialogue in the film, and conceived a riff with chord changes to match the punches in the boxing scenes. "Eye of the Tiger" reached number one on the charts of many countries. In the US, it was number one on the Billboard Hot 100 chart for six weeks, spent 15 consecutive weeks in the top 10, and was the second-bestselling single of 1982. It was certified platinum in August 1982, for sales of two million copies. In the UK, "Eye of the Tiger" sold 956,000 copies and was number one on the UK singles chart for four consecutive weeks.

== Reception ==
=== Box office ===
Rocky III was an enormous box-office success and surpassed the gross of its predecessor. The film grossed $16,015,408 in its opening weekend. It was dropped to second place behind Star Trek II: The Wrath of Khan during its second weekend and it was dropped to third place behind The Wrath of Khan and E.T. the Extra-Terrestrial during its third weekend and earned $125,049,125 during its North American theatrical run, becoming the fourth-highest-grossing film of 1982; its worldwide box-office earnings stand at around $270 million. Roger Ebert and Gene Siskel attributed the film's success to the positive reaction from critics and audiences towards Rocky II and the production team's "quality control" of that film. Siskel stated, "If you want a hugely successful series, then make sure that the second one is a winner."

=== Critical response ===
Rocky III holds a score of 66% rating on review aggregator Rotten Tomatoes based on 92 reviews, with an average rating of 5.8/10. The film's consensus reads, "It's noticeably subject to the law of diminishing returns, but Rocky III still has enough brawny spectacle to stand in the ring with the franchise's better entries". On Metacritic, the film has a weighted average score of 57 out of 100 based on reviews from 10 critics, indicating "mixed or average reviews". The film is one of the few which has received the rare A+ grade from audiences surveyed by CinemaScore.

Gene Siskel gave the film two and a half out of four and wrote, "Sorry to say this, but there's not anything new in Rocky III, and we sit there wondering why it exists." He added, "we see nothing new about Rocky's character, except that the tender side of his soul, which made him so appealing, is now virtually missing. Rocky Balboa in Rocky III is no longer likable." Pauline Kael of The New Yorker stated, "The first Rocky was primitive in a relatively innocent way. This picture is primitive, but it's also shrewd and empty and inept." Sheila Benson of the Los Angeles Times wrote, "Somehow, Sylvester Stallone has kicked life into what you might imagine is a pretty tired Rocky Balboa and has gotten him up on his feet again ... Rocky III works, possibly even better than numbers I and II." Rita Kempley of The Washington Post called it "as much fun as ever, a ground-meat-and-potatoes movie, with guys beating hell out of each other to a disco beat". Tom Milne of The Monthly Film Bulletin wrote, "Starting off with a replay of our hero's second miraculous return from the dead to win the championship back at the end of Rocky II—itself a virtual repeat from the original Rocky—Rocky III soon demonstrates that it has nothing to offer but more of the same ... There are fleeting moments, thanks chiefly to a personable performance from Carl Weathers, but the time has surely come for Rocky Balboa to take the final count."

=== Accolades ===
Award	Ceremony date	Category	Recipients	Result	Ref.
Young Artist Awards	21 November 1982	Best Family Motion Picture	Rocky III	Won	
Young Artist Awards	21 November 1982	Best Young Supporting Actor in a Motion Picture	Ian Fried	Nominated	
Jupiter Awards	1983	Best International Actor	Sylvester Stallone	Nominated	
Golden Globe Awards	29 January 1983	Best Original Song	"Eye of the Tiger"; Music and Lyrics by Jim Peterik and Frankie Sullivan	Nominated	
NAACP Image Awards	28 February 1983	Outstanding Motion Picture	Rocky III	Nominated	
Japan Academy Film Prize	19 March 1983	Outstanding Foreign Language Film	Rocky III	Nominated	
British Academy Film Awards	20 March 1983	Best Original Song	"Eye of the Tiger"; Music and Lyrics by Jim Peterik and Frankie Sullivan	Nominated	
Academy Awards	11 April 1983	Best Original Song	"Eye of the Tiger"; Music and Lyrics by Jim Peterik and Frankie Sullivan	Nominated	
Golden Raspberry Awards	11 April 1983	Worst New Star	Mr. T	Nominated	
Satellite Awards	20 November 2009	Outstanding Overall Blu-Ray/DVD	Rocky: The Undisputed Collection	Nominated	
Online Film & Television Association Awards	6 March 2022	Hall of Fame – Songs	"Eye of the Tiger"	Inducted	

=== Year-end lists ===
The film is recognized by American Film Institute in these lists:

- 2004: AFI's 100 Years...100 Songs:
  - "Eye of the Tiger" – Nominated

== Sequel ==
A sequel titled Rocky IV, was released in November 1985.

== Other media ==
=== Rocky statue in Philadelphia ===
A bronze statue of Rocky was commissioned by Sylvester Stallone and created by A. Thomas Schomberg in 1981. Ultimately three statues were created, with the first placed on the top of the steps (known as the Rocky Steps) of the Philadelphia Museum of Art for the filming of Rocky III. After filming was complete, following a debate between the Art Museum and the City's Art Commission over whether the installed statue was considered "art" or a "movie prop", the city moved the statue to the Spectrum in South Philadelphia. In 2006, the statue was returned to the Art Museum, this time placed at the bottom of the Rocky Steps in celebration of the film Rocky Balboa. The second statue, owned by Sylvester Stallone, was temporarily installed atop the steps in 2024 for the inaugural Rockyfest celebration; it was later permanently replaced by the first statue in 2026. The third statue was installed at Terminal West A at Philadelphia International Airport.

A similar statue is located in Žitište, Serbia.

=== Novelization ===
A novelization by Robert E. Hoban was published by Ballantine Books in 1982.

=== Video games ===
A video game based on the film was released in 1983, titled Rocky Super Action Boxing, designed by Coleco and released for ColecoVision. Players can play as either Rocky Balboa or Clubber Lang either against the computer in a one-player game, or against each other in a "Head to Head" two-player mode. In 1987, Rocky, based on the first four Rocky films, was released. In 2002, Rocky was released, based on the first five Rocky films. In 2004, Rocky Legends, based on the first four Rocky films, was released.

== See also ==
- List of boxing films
