= Rocky (2002 video game) =

- North American PS2 cover art
- Developers: Rage Newcastle (PS2, Xbox); Steel Monkeys (GCN); Virtucraft (GBA)
- Publishers: PAL: Rage Software; NA: Ubi Soft
- Platforms: Xbox; Game Boy Advance; PlayStation 2; GameCube
- Release: Xbox: PAL: October 18, 2002; NA: November 12, 2002; Game Boy Advance: PAL: October 25, 2002; NA: November 14, 2002; PlayStation 2: PAL: November 15, 2002; NA: November 19, 2002; GameCube: NA: November 14, 2002; PAL: November 22, 2002
- Genre: Fighting
- Modes: Single-player, multiplayer

Rocky is a fighting video game published by Rage Software and released in 2002. The game is based on the Rocky franchise.

In the game the player controls Rocky Balboa on his journey from a club fighter, facing opponents like Spider Rico, until his championship bout against Apollo Creed and beyond. The game sticks closely to the movies, with all included characters being at least mentioned in the movies. In at least the PAL markets the PlayStation 2 and Xbox versions of the game were packaged alongside the original Rocky DVD release. A sequel was also made, called Rocky Legends (2004).

== Gameplay ==
The gameplay mirrors that of other boxing games of its generation.

In Story Mode, the player takes control of Rocky Balboa fighting many opponents, either new or already existent within the film series. Regular boxing match rules apply to any fight: winning depends on how many punches the player has landed or if the opponent has been knocked down and not gotten up within a ten-second time limit. The maximum number of rounds in a match is 15, and a round may last for a maximum of 180 seconds. Story Mode also includes training minigames, where the player can increase Rocky's stats. Each individual minigame increases a specific stat:

- Punching Mitts: Strength
- Speed Bag: Speed
- Skipping: Stamina
- Sit ups: Determination
- Heavy Bag: Movement

Besides Story Mode, other modes include Exhibition Match, Sparring, and Knockout Tournament.

== Audio and video content used from the film series ==
The game's intro movie features film footage edited from the first five movies showing the main boxers and ends with an advert for the Rocky DVD. The remaining five cutscenes feature CGI footage using the in-game character models and original film audio recreating segments from the films. The 1976 song "Gonna Fly Now" is the only one from the movie series featured in the game, the rest of the score being created in-house.

== Development ==
The game was developed for Xbox and PlayStation 2 at the Newcastle upon Tyne studio of Rage Software in England. A derivative GameCube conversion was developed by Steel Monkeys in Scotland, and a Game Boy Advance version with different gameplay by Virtucraft. It was published by Rage Software, and in the US additionally by Ubi Soft.

== Reception ==
Reception

Aggregate scores
| Aggregator | Score |
|---|---|
| GameRankings | (Xbox) 78.75% (PS2) 76.61% (GC) 72.30% (GBA) 58.63% |
| Metacritic | (Xbox) 74/100 (PS2) 74/100 (GC) 74/100 (GBA) 63/100 |

Review scores
| Publication | Score |
|---|---|
| AllGame | 3/5 (GBA) 2/5 |
| Edge | 8/10 |
| Electronic Gaming Monthly | 7/10 |
| Eurogamer | 8/10 |
| Game Informer | (GBA) 7.5/10 (Xbox) 7/10 |
| GameSpot | (GBA) 5.7/10; 5.5/10 |
| GameSpy | (Xbox) 4/5; 3.5/5 (PS2) 3/5 |
| GameZone | (PS2) 9.1/10 (GC) 9/10 (Xbox) 7.8/10 (GBA) 6.9/10 |
| IGN | (Xbox) 8.7/10 (GC) 8.5/10 (PS2) 8.3/10 |
| Nintendo Power | (GC) 3.9/5 (GBA) 3.2/5 |
| Official U.S. PlayStation Magazine | 4/5 |
| Official Xbox Magazine (US) | 7.3/10 |
| Entertainment Weekly | B− |

Rocky received "mixed or average" reviews, according to review aggregator website Metacritic. GameRankings gave it a score of 78.75% for the Xbox version, 76.61% for the PlayStation 2 version, 72.30% for the GameCube version, and 58.63% for the Game Boy Advance version.

Owing to positive critical reception and sales, after the closure of Rage Software the developers of the lead version formed Venom Games to create a sequel, Rocky Legends (2004), this time published directly by Ubisoft.

== Sequel ==
A sequel to the game, titled Rocky Legends (2004), was released for the PlayStation 2 and Xbox on September 28, 2004. It was developed by Venom Games and published by Ubisoft.
