= Rocky Steps =

Iconic construction in Philadelphia, Pennsylvania, U.S.

Coordinates: 39°57′54″N 75°10′49″W

Video of Sylvester Stallone as Rocky Balboa running up the front steps of the Philadelphia Museum of Art in Philadelphia in Rocky in 1976; the iconic scene gave birth to the steps' notoriety and popularity.

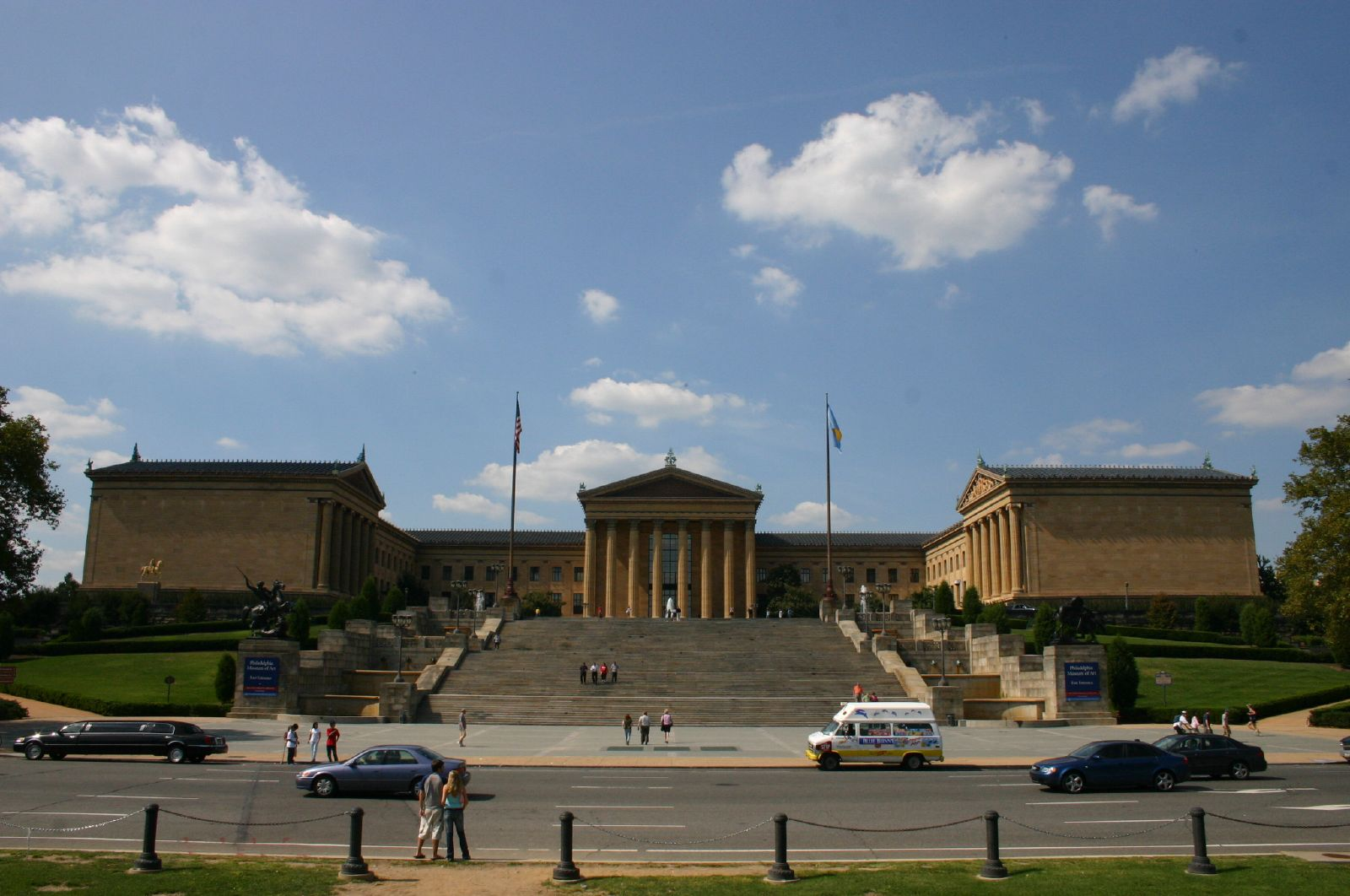
The rear entrance and steps to the Philadelphia Museum of Art

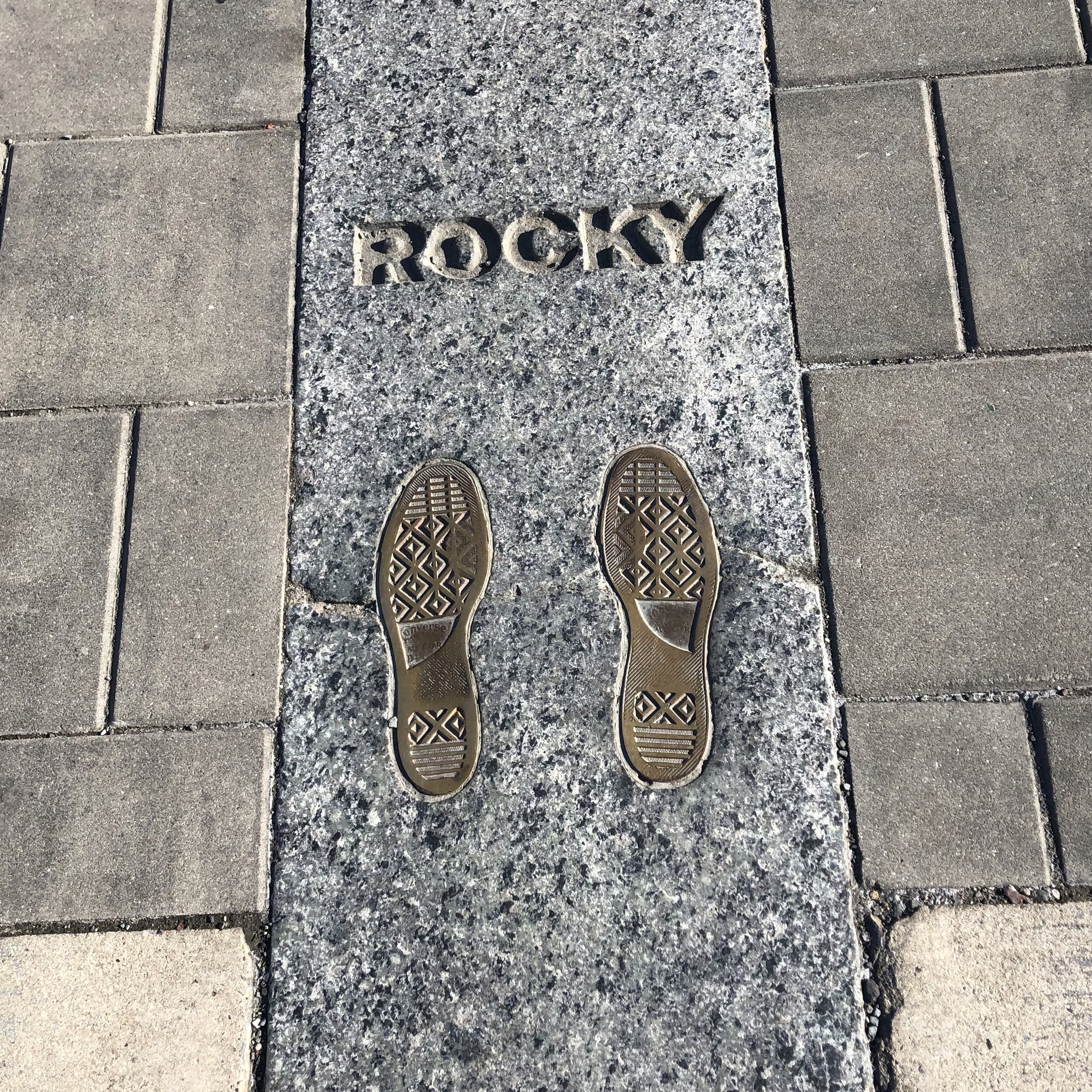
Rocky Balboa sneaker imprints at the top of the Rocky Steps at the Philadelphia Museum of Art

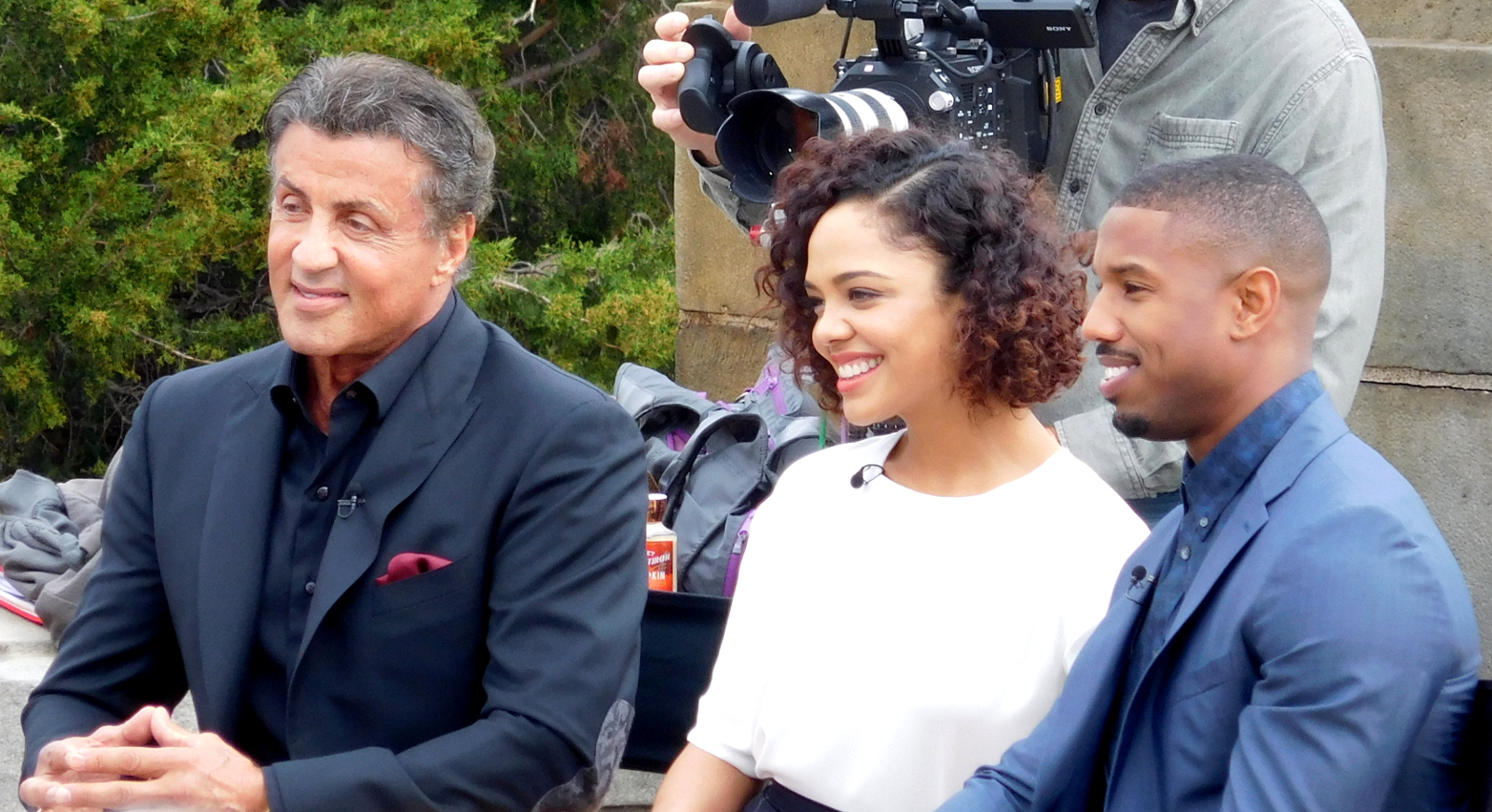
Sylvester Stallone, Tessa Thompson, and Michael B. Jordan promoting Creed atop the Rocky Steps in November 2015

The Rocky Steps is an informal name to the 72 stone steps leading up to the East entrance of the Philadelphia Museum of Art in Philadelphia that gained global fame after being featured in a notable scene from the 1976 film Rocky. In the scene, Rocky Balboa, an unpolished but ambitious boxer from Kensington played by Sylvester Stallone, begins intense physical training after deciding to fight Apollo Creed, the World Heavyweight Champion. The scene is widely considered one of the most iconic in the history of modern films.

Tourists often mimic Rocky's famous climb, which has become a physical metaphor for an underdog rising to a great challenge. A bronze Rocky statue is located at the top of the steps, and is a popular photo opportunity for visitors. The top of the steps offers a commanding view of Eakins Oval, Benjamin Franklin Parkway, and Philadelphia City Hall.

== History ==
Rocky creator Sylvester Stallone has recounted that the genesis of the iconic scene occurred when the 1976 film crew for the movie, constrained by a tight budget, identified the steps one night while searching for filming locations around the city. Stallone first thought Rocky should carry his dog Butkus up the steps, but the big bull mastiff proved too heavy for the scene to work. Still, the view from the top of the stairs inspired him to reshoot the scene without the dog. In the 2006 film Rocky Balboa, Rocky lifts his dog Punchy when he reaches the top of the steps. The closing credits of Rocky Balboa show a montage of dozens of people running up the steps. The 72 steps are grouped into six sections; the top set has seven steps, while the lower five have thirteen each.

This scene was one of the first uses in a major film of the Steadicam, a stabilized camera mount that allows its operator to walk and even climb steps while smoothly filming.

Boxer Joe Frazier, who had a paid cameo as himself later in the film, claimed that the scene was based in his training, even if he was not paid for it.

=== Rocky statue ===
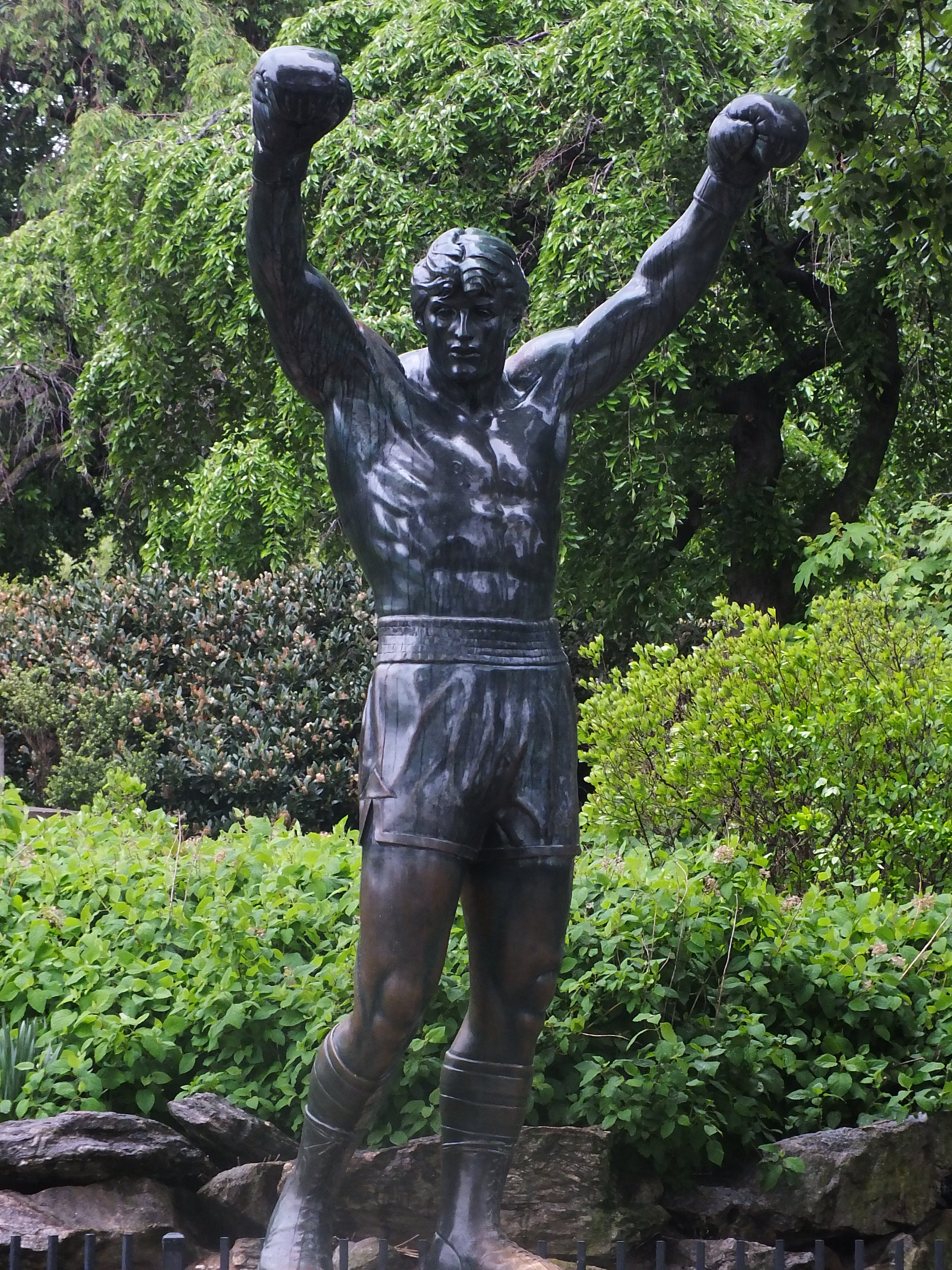
The Rocky Statue at the bottom of the Rocky Steps

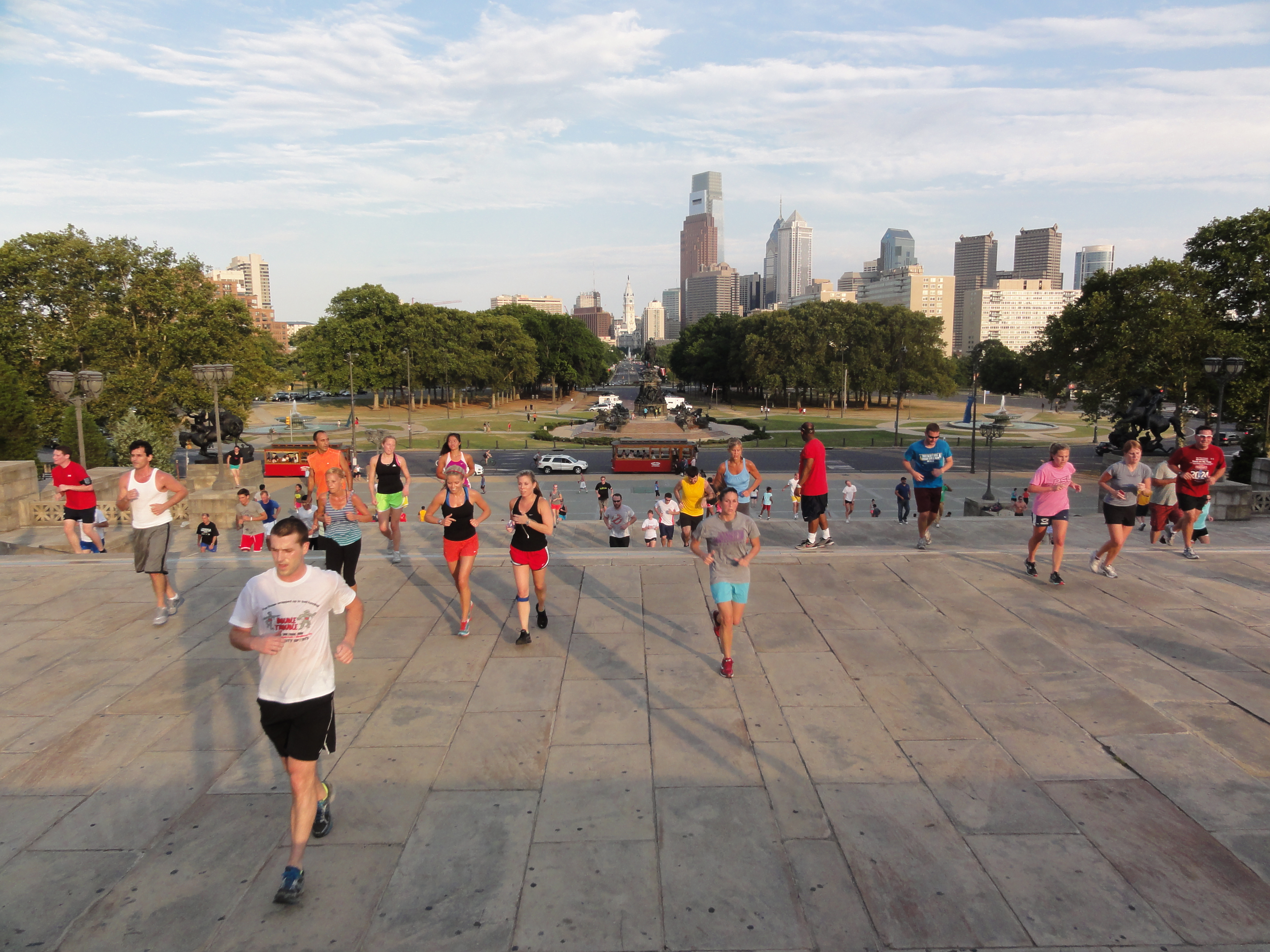
View from the top of the steps with runners making the iconic climb up the steps. The Benjamin Franklin Parkway and Center City Philadelphia skyline are in the background.

Prior to the 1982 release of Rocky III, Sylvester Stallone commissioned A. Thomas Schomberg to create a bronze statue of Rocky. Three 2-ton, 10-foot (3.0 m)-tall copies would eventually be cast:

- The first was installed atop the steps for the filming of Rocky III, after which it was relocated to the Philadelphia Spectrum and then to the bottom of the Rocky Steps, where it remained for many years before it was again moved, this time permanently, to the top of the steps.
- The second Rocky statue, which was created as a backup, was displayed in the San Diego Hall of Champions Sports Museum in San Diego, California, until it closed in 2017. The statue was then put up for auction, and purchased by an anonymous buyer who was later revealed to be Stallone himself. It was later temporarily installed at the top of the Rocky Steps, before it was returned to Stallone.
- Years later Schomberg realized the casting mold for the statue was beginning to decay, and the third and final edition of the statue was cast in bronze and put up for auction on eBay three separate times between 2002 and 2005, with a starting bid of US$5,000,000, then US$3,000,000, and finally US$1,000,000 to raise funds for the International Institute for Sport and Olympic History. It was exhibited at the Schomberg Studios Gallery in Denver, Colorado. After being purchased by the city, in November 2025 the third statue was installed inside Terminal A West at Philadelphia International Airport.

After the filming of Rocky III was complete, a debate arose between the Philadelphia Museum of Art and Philadelphia's Art Commission over whether the statue installed at the Museum met the definition of art. City officials argued that the Rocky statue was not "art" but a "movie prop", and after a few months moved it to the front of the Philadelphia Spectrum, which was then the indoor arena for the Philadelphia 76ers and Philadelphia Flyers. It was later returned to the Philadelphia Museum of Art for the filming of Rocky V, then brought back to the Spectrum. It was also temporarily reinstalled at the Museum for the production of the films Mannequin and Philadelphia. At the Museum the statue was replaced with a bronze inlay of Converse sneaker footprints with the name "Rocky" above them. In 2002 the statue was put into storage. The statue's removal was the subject of a joke in Rocky Balboa.

On September 8, 2006, the Rocky statue was returned to the Art Museum and placed on a pedestal in a grassy area near the foot of the steps to the right of the Museum. The unveiling ceremony included live music, the debut of the first full trailer for Rocky Balboa, and a free showing of the first Rocky movie. At the ceremony, Philadelphia Mayor John Street said that the steps were one of Philly's biggest tourist attractions, and that Stallone, a native New Yorker, had become "the city's favorite adopted son".

In December 2024, the second Rocky statue owned by Stallone was loaned to the city and installed at the top of the steps for the inaugural Rockyfest celebration. In March 2026, the original statue at the foot of the steps was moved inside the Museum for a Rocky exhibition; after the exhibit finished in August it was returned permanently to the top of the steps, replacing Stallone's statue. A statue of Joe Frazier was put in its former spot near the foot of the steps.

== In popular culture ==
The British theatrical movie poster for Rocky

The Rocky film scene has become a cultural icon. Many tourists visit the steps to recreate the scene themselves, and the Rocky 50k ultrarunning course ends with an ascent of the steps. E! Channel ranked it No. 13 in its 101 Most Awesome Moments in Entertainment. During the 1996 Olympic Torch Relay, Philadelphia native Dawn Staley was chosen to run up the museum steps. The steps are the backdrop for the annual Independence Day celebration, and have often been featured in large concerts such as Live 8. Two journalists from the Philadelphia Inquirer spent a year interviewing people who ran the steps, and published a book in 1996 called Rocky Stories: Tales of Love, Hope, and Happiness at America's Most Famous Steps. On November 13, 2026, nearly 50 years after the film was released, 570 people gathered at the steps while dressed as Rocky, breaking a Guinness World Record.

=== Sports ===
The 2017 NFL draft was held from the steps, the first time the NFL draft was held outdoors.

The Rocky Steps has been the subject of pregame rituals by NFL fans right before their team plays the Philadelphia Eagles, which sometimes sees the Rocky statue dressed up in the visiting team's gear. In one notable example, in the days leading up to the 2017–18 NFC Championship, Minnesota Vikings fans were seen performing the "Skol!" chant around various Philadelphia landmarks, including the Philadelphia Museum of Art, where they also adorned the Rocky statue with Vikings colors. The Eagles defeated the visiting Vikings, 38–7, which was nicknamed the "Minneapolis Massacre", in reference to the Viking's win over the Saints the previous week. The loss denied the Vikings the opportunity to become the first team to play in a Super Bowl in its home stadium. This and other examples led to the creation of a superstition that suggests that when fans of non-Philadelphia teams dress up the Rocky statue in their team's gear, their team loses. In response, in the run-up to Super Bowl LVII, the Kansas City Chiefs' Travis Kelce warned "Chiefs, do not touch the fucking Rocky memorial!"

The so-called "Rocky Statue Curse" gained international attention during the 2026 FIFA World Cup when Ecuadorian fans dressed the statue in the uniform of the Ecuadorian football team before their group stage match against Ivory Coast on 14 June 2026; Ecuador would go on to lose the match, leading Visit Pennsylvania to warn international soccer fans about the alleged curse on social media, while some Brazilian fans went as far as roping off the statue and carrying warning placards to ward off other fans from dressing the statue before their team's clash against Haiti a few days later.

=== Homages ===
The scene has inspired homages and parodies since Rocky was released in 1976.

- In The Simpsons 2003 episode "I'm Spelling as Fast as I Can", Lisa Simpson runs up a flight of stairs wearing a tracksuit similar to Rocky's.
- In Chowder episode "The Broken Part", during his training, the titular character runs up a stairs with a boxer's statue at the top of them.
- In the 2005 film In Her Shoes, Toni Collette's character, Rose Feller, runs up the steps with four dogs.
- On the episode "The Philadelphia Story" of The Fresh Prince of Bel-Air, the character Will, while back in Philly, trains for a big fight against a former neighborhood bully; the training ends with Will running up the steps to "Gonna Fly Now", and celebrating and passing out, where a passer-by steals his wallet and hat.
- In the 1996 Eddie Murphy film The Nutty Professor, Sherman Klump runs up the steps to one of his college's buildings, parodying the scene.
- Participants in Philadelphia's monthly Critical Mass bike ride generally finish up by cycling to the Rocky Steps, hoisting their bicycles, running up the steps, then lifting their bikes above their heads.
- In a Reebok campaign, Allen Iverson, then with the Philadelphia 76ers, ran up the steps while dribbling a basketball.
- In the opening episode of the 2005 boxing reality television series The Contender (which featured and was executive produced by Stallone), Philadelphia native Najai Turpin ran up the steps.
- In the 2019 film Shazam!, Billy Batson/Shazam and Freddy Freeman sit on the steps, with Billy/Shazam commenting, "Man, it's a pretty sick view. I totally get why Rocky was training so hard to get up here." Later on in the film, Shazam puts on a show for people atop the same steps, firing bolts of lightning to the beat of "Eye of the Tiger" by Survivor, which also served as the theme song to Rocky III.
- In the 2023 French film Marinette, the soccer player Marinette Pichon runs up the steps while playing for the Philadelphia Charge women's football team.

== See also ==
- Rocky statue in Žitište
- Potemkin Stairs
- Exorcist steps
- Joker Stairs
- The Music Box Steps
