= Rocky Balboa =

Character in the Rocky film series

Rocky Balboa The Italian Stallion
- Rocky character
- Sylvester Stallone as Rocky Balboa in Rocky III (1982)
- First appearance: Rocky (1976)
- Last appearance: Creed II (2018)
- Created by: Sylvester Stallone
- Based on: Chuck Wepner; Rocky Marciano
- Portrayed by: Sylvester Stallone

In-universe information
- Full name: Robert Balboa
- Alias: Rocky
- Nicknames: The Italian Stallion; The Pride of Philadelphia; Philadelphia's Favorite Son; The Iron Horse; Stallion; Uncle Rock; Rocco; Rock; Meatball Small Weenuk
- Title: 2x World Heavyweight Champion
- Occupation: Professional boxer Restaurant owner and union butcher Boxing trainer Loan Shark Collector
- Spouse: Adrianna Pennino Balboa (deceased)
- Children: Robert Balboa Jr. (son)
- Relatives: Paulie Pennino (brother-in-law; deceased); Logan Balboa (grandson); Donnie Creed (surrogate nephew); Amara Creed (surrogate great-niece; goddaughter)
- Religion: Roman Catholic
- Nationality: American
- Ethnicity: Italian

Robert "Rocky" Balboa (also known by his ring name the Italian Stallion) is a fictional character and the titular protagonist of the Rocky franchise. The character was created by Sylvester Stallone, who has also portrayed him in eight of the nine films in the franchise. He is depicted as a working class or poor Italian-American from the slums of Philadelphia who started out as a club fighter and "enforcer" for a local Philly Mafia loan shark. He is portrayed as overcoming the obstacles that had occurred in his life and in his career as a professional boxer.

While the story of his first film was partly inspired by a 1975 fight between underdog Chuck Wepner and heavyweight champion Muhammad Ali (which nearly went the 15-round distance despite the odds), the inspiration for the name, iconography and fighting style came from boxing legend Rocco Francis "Rocky Marciano" Marchegiano, though his surname coincidentally also resembles that of Middleweight Boxing Champion Thomas Rocco "Rocky Graziano" Barbella.

The character is widely considered to be Stallone's most iconic role and is often considered the role that started his film career. He received critical acclaim for his performance in the first movie, earning Academy Award and Golden Globe Award nominations. When Stallone reprised his role once again in 2015 for Creed, his performance received universal acclaim and he received his first Golden Globe Award for Best Supporting Actor, along with his third Oscar nomination for Best Supporting Actor, the National Board of Review Award for Best Supporting Actor and several other accolades.

== Character biography ==
Robert "Rocky" Balboa was born in Philadelphia, Pennsylvania in 1945. He was the only child in a Roman Catholic Italian or Italian immigrant family. (Note: However, despite Rocky's Italian ethnicity, the surname Balboa (Italian pronunciation: [balˈbɔːa]; roughly meaning "beautiful valley") generally originates from a Galician-speaking town in northwestern Spain) Rocky appears to be fully or semi-fluent in the Italian language; when Rocky is spoken to in Italian by his priest, Father Carmine, it is apparent that Rocky understands the language very well or fluently, including in a scene in which he translates Italian into English for Tommy Gunn. However, despite Rocky's obvious understanding of Italian, it is unclear and undetermined how well he actually speaks the language, as his responses to Father Carmine are always in English.

During the scene in Rocky in which Rocky takes Adrianna "Adrian" Pennino skating on Thanksgiving, he tells her, "Yeah – My old man, who was never the sharpest, told me I weren't born with much brain, so I better use my body." This encouraged him to take up boxing. He trained very hard so he could grow up to be like his idol Rocky Marciano. Unable to live on the low pay of club fights, and being unable to find work anywhere else, Rocky got a job as a collector for Tony Gazzo, the local loan shark, to make ends meet. Rocky was proud that he never had his nose broken in any of his amateur fighting career. His nickname is the Italian Stallion, from his Italian-American heritage.

=== Rocky (1976) ===
The first film begins on November 25, 1975, in the slums of the Kensington section of Philadelphia. Rocky Balboa is fighting Spider Rico in a local boxing ring called the Cambria Fight Club (nicknamed "The Bucket of Blood") inside a chapel. Rico hits Rocky with a headbutt, leaving a gash on his forehead. Rocky then delivers a vicious barrage of punches, knocking Rico out. The next day, Rocky stops by the J&M Tropical Fish pet shop, where he meets Adrian Pennino, sister of his best friend Paulie. Adrian is very shy and scared of Rocky's tough appearance, even though Rocky is kind to her and shows her respect. Afterward, Rocky goes to collect for his loan shark boss, Tony Gazzo. Even though the client, Bob, does not have the money, Rocky does not break his thumbs, despite Gazzo ordering him to do so.

Rocky stops by the local boxing gym and finds his locker has been taken by another local contender. The gym's owner and grizzled former boxer, Mickey Goldmill, who always considered Rocky's potential to be better than his effort, chides him for his association with Gazzo. Rocky sees a young girl named Marie hanging around a bad crowd and walks her home, advising her about staying away from the wrong people. However, Marie assumes Rocky is trying to flirt with her, and dismisses him. Rocky walks home, frustrated how nothing is going right in his life.

When the undisputed World Heavyweight Champion, Apollo Creed, decides that he wants to give an unknown fighter a chance to fight for the title after his intended challenger, Mac Lee Green, broke his hand while training, and with no other contender available for a fight on New Years Day, Creed chooses Rocky because he likes Rocky's nickname, 'The Italian Stallion' and the idea of fighting on the first day of the 1976 bicentennial year against one of what he calls Christopher Columbus' descendants. However, Apollo's trainer, Tony "Duke" Evers, warns Creed of Rocky being a southpaw (left-handed boxer). After getting picked by Creed, Rocky is approached by Mickey, who convinces Rocky he can help prepare him for the match. Mickey reveals that his own career never got anywhere because he did not have a manager and he does not want the same thing to happen to Rocky. At the same time, Rocky begins dating Adrian and helps her to become more self-confident and stand up for herself. Rocky confides in Adrian before the fight that, although he figures that he may not win, he wants to at least "go the distance".

The fight takes place at the Philadelphia Spectrum on January 1, 1976. In the first round, Rocky knocks Creed down for the first time in his career and Creed responds by breaking Rocky's nose, the first time in his career. The match becomes a long and gruelling battle for both competitors; although Rocky does not have Creed's level of skill, he has crippling, sledgehammer-like power and is determined to keep fighting. In the 14th round, Rocky is nearly knocked out but manages to get back up and delivers some hard body shots, breaking Creed's ribs just before the bell. The 15th round comes to naught and Rocky manages to pummel Creed until the bell rings once more, ending the fight, which ends in a split decision win for Creed. Adrian climbs into the ring and embraces Rocky as they both profess their love for each other.

=== Rocky II (1979) ===
After the match, Creed demands a rematch with Rocky under the stress of being humiliated by the press for failing to beat Rocky convincingly, as well as his own knowledge that he did not give his best in the match, stating that he would fight him 'anywhere, anyplace, anytime' to prove to the world that Rocky's feat was merely a fluke. Rocky initially declines and retires from boxing, having surgery for retinal detachment, a condition that could lead to permanent blindness. He marries Adrian, who convinces Rocky to live outside boxing, and she becomes pregnant with her and Rocky's first child soon after. However, the money from the match with Creed is quickly frittered away, so Adrian reclaims her part-time job at the J&M Tropical Fish pet shop.

Determined to get Rocky back in the ring, Creed instructs his public relations team to publicly goad Rocky, although Duke begs Creed to move on to other opponents. At first, Rocky is unaffected by Creed's smear campaign, but his inexperience with money causes him to run into financial troubles. A grade-school drop-out, Rocky soon realizes that he has no white-collar skills beyond the eighth grade and is, in fact, barely literate. He does, however, improve his reading skills by reading books aloud to Adrian. Rocky struggles to find employment with decent pay, when he is fired from a commercial studio, turned down for an office job, and even laid off at the Shamrock meat packing facility.

Despite Adrian's objections, and after Creed insults Rocky on national television and through the newspapers, he agrees to the rematch. Without Adrian's support, however, Rocky cannot concentrate on his training whatsoever, leaving Mick both frustrated and worried. The heavily pregnant Adrian goes into preterm labour due to stress and slips into a coma after giving birth to her and Rocky's son, Robert 'Rocky' Jr.

After Adrian comes out of her coma, she promises her full support to Rocky. Despite the limited time they have left, Mickey and Rocky train hard, focusing on Rocky's speed and improving his right-handed punching (Rocky being a southpaw). At the same time, Creed is also focused on his training under Duke's supervision, taking this match much more seriously than the previous time. The rematch is set for Thanksgiving. Creed dominates the fight, but is fixated on knocking Rocky out, despite Duke's pleas to fight from distance and win on points. The match goes the full 15 rounds again, with both Rocky and Creed falling to the canvas after Rocky lands a succession of left hands. As referee Lou Fillipo exercises his 10-count, Creed and Rocky struggle to get back up, but Creed falls back down in exhaustion. Rocky is able to get back up from sheer determination, beating the 10-count and winning by knockout, becoming heavyweight champion of the world.

=== Rocky III (1982) ===
Over the next five years, Rocky successfully defends his title in ten consecutive matches against various contenders, amassing wealth and worldwide fame in the process. In addition, Rocky also has a charity exhibition match against the World Heavyweight Wrestling Champion, "Thunderlips" (Hulk Hogan). However, during a dedication ceremony unveiling a statue of Rocky in the city, Rocky is challenged by a young power-hungry fighter named James "Clubber" Lang (Mr. T), who has risen to the top of the rankings. Mickey refuses to train Rocky to face Lang, and Rocky is stunned by Mickey's revelation Rocky faced "hand-picked" challengers that were "good fighters, but not 'killers'" which Lang seemingly is.

Mickey insists that he would step down as Rocky's manager if he chooses to fight Lang, but Rocky convinces him to train him for one last match. However, like Creed in the first film, Rocky does not put his heart into training properly, and this reinforces Mickey's belief that Rocky has become too comfortable (or "civilized") as champion. Before the match, pandemonium erupts backstage, Lang shoving Mickey out of the way during a trash-talk exchange with Rocky, causing Mickey to suffer a cardiac arrest. Distraught, Rocky requests to call the match off, but Mickey urges him on. A distracted Rocky attempts to knock Lang out early with a barrage of huge blows, but his lack of proper conditioning is exposed by Lang, who viciously knocks out Rocky in the second round, winning the title.

After the match, Rocky rushes to Mickey's side before he dies, devastating Rocky. After the funeral, a depressed Rocky visits Mickey's now-abandoned gym, where he finds Apollo Creed, who had witnessed the match against Lang as a guest commentator. Creed explains to Rocky, that when they fought, he won because he was competitive. He convinces Rocky that he needs to get his fire ("the eye of the tiger") back. Creed offers to train Rocky for a rematch against Lang, taking Rocky to the "Tough Gym" in Los Angeles, to meet Duke, who himself appears eager to finally be in Rocky's corner.

After Rocky initially struggles to adapt to Creed's methods, Adrian helps Rocky overcome Mickey's death. Rocky manages to put his doubts behind him and regain his fighting spirit under Apollo and Duke's guidance. Fighting with a style very reminiscent of Creed's own boxing technique mixed with his own style, Rocky wins the rematch against Lang by K.O., dodging and absorbing Lang's best blows and still standing, regaining his world heavyweight title. After his victory, Rocky honours Creed's favor: a third fight together, albeit a private sparring match between friends, which Rocky happily accepts. The film ends as they each throw punches at the same time, symbolizing the equality of their greatness. The result is not revealed until the 2015 film Creed, in which Rocky tells Creed's son, Adonis, that his father won the fight.

=== Rocky IV (1985) ===
Soviet World Amateur Champion and Olympic gold medallist-turned-professional fighter Ivan Drago (Dolph Lundgren) and his entourage arrive in the United States in a bid to demonstrate the superiority of Russian athletes. Motivated by patriotism, Apollo Creed challenges Drago to an exhibition bout in Las Vegas, with Rocky and Duke in his corner. Creed, past his prime but still in good shape, again does not take his opponent seriously. Creed takes a serious beating by Drago in the first round, and Rocky pleads with Creed to let him stop the fight. In the second round, Creed continues to be brutally beaten by Drago, but refuses to allow Rocky to throw in the towel. After a final blow from Drago, Creed falls limp in the ring and dies in Rocky's arms.

Feeling responsible for Creed's death and incensed by Drago and the Russians' cold indifference, Rocky decides to take on Drago himself, but in order to do so, has to surrender his championship title. Rocky travels to the cold mountains of Russia with Duke and Paulie. Despite her initial misgivings, Adrian eventually joins him. Rocky trains hard using old-school methods within the mountainous terrain of Krasnoyarsk, Siberia, while Drago trains with state-of-the-art equipment and steroid enhancement. Duke confides in Rocky that Apollo was like a son to him, and that Rocky now stands alone as the carrier of Apollo's legacy.

The match against Drago takes place on Christmas Day 1985 in Moscow. Drago gains the upper hand in the early moments, but in the second round, Rocky strikes back with a haymaker that cuts Drago below the eye. With Drago's confidence shaken, Duke urges Rocky on, sensing that Drago is vulnerable. The match goes on in a bloody back-and-forth battle, with the Soviet crowd, who originally rooted for Drago, beginning to cheer for Rocky, while Drago's trainers and manager become increasingly upset over his inability to finish Rocky. In the end, Rocky's superior stamina and determination to win perseveres and he finally knocks Drago out in closing moments of the 15th round. After the match, Rocky gives a passionate thank-you speech to the crowd while receiving a standing ovation both from the crowd and the politicians in attendance.

=== Rocky V (1990) ===
After the bout with Ivan Drago, while Rocky is showering, he begins to display signs of trauma. His hands tremble relentlessly, and he tells Adrian he is tired and wants to go home, accidentally addressing her as Mickey. Upon returning to the United States, Rocky's press conference is interrupted by promoter George Washington Duke and Union Cane (Michael Williams) who challenge Rocky to a title fight to be held in Tokyo. Rocky leaves without accepting. After returning home, Rocky goes to say goodnight to his son, Robert, but when Rocky goes downstairs, he overhears Adrian and Paulie arguing.

Paulie unknowingly had Rocky sign a power of attorney over to Rocky's investment accountant, who had embezzled and squandered all of his money on real estate deals gone sour. In addition, the accountant had failed to pay Rocky's taxes over the past six years and his mansion had been mortgaged by $400,000. Rocky decides to accept the fight with Cane, but Adrian demands that Rocky see a doctor. Rocky is diagnosed with Cavum septi pellucidi, a form of brain damage caused by the extremely heavy blows to the head Rocky took from Drago. At Adrian's urging, Rocky reluctantly retires from boxing. His only remaining asset is Mickey's gym, which had been willed by Mickey to Robert. After selling their mansion and auctioning their belongings, the Balboas return to their old neighborhood, moving back into Adrian and Paulie's old house in South Philadelphia. Rocky reopens Mickey's gym as a means of income, while Adrian returns to work at the J&M Tropical Fish pet shop, where she was employed where she first met Rocky.

Rocky meets a young boxer from Oklahoma named Tommy Gunn (Tommy Morrison) and begins training him. Tommy quickly becomes a top contender, but suffers from constantly being put in Rocky's shadow by the media. Rocky becomes so distracted training Tommy that he ends up neglecting Robert. On Christmas Eve, Tommy tells Rocky he wants to team up with Duke, but Rocky explains that dealing with Duke would be a dirty business. Tommy regrets being Rocky's protégé, drives off in a huff, and leaves him for good. Adrian attempts to comfort Rocky, but Rocky's frustrations boil over. After they reconcile, Rocky meets Robert and they finally pick up the pieces.

Rocky is still anxious as he watches Tommy win the world heavyweight title from Cane by a first-round knockout, however Tommy credits his success to Duke instead of Rocky. Tommy is booed by the crowd and ridiculed in the post-fight press conference, having never gone up against a "real contender" he is not regarded as a real champion or heir to the belt. This motivates Tommy, with prodding from Duke, to publicly challenge Rocky to a fight.

While Rocky is at a local bar, Tommy steps in and insults Rocky. After Paulie insults Tommy back and is sucker-punched by Tommy, Rocky confronts Tommy and challenges him to a street fight. Tommy gains the upper hand, causing Rocky to have nightmarish glimpses of Ivan Drago, his loss to Clubber Lang, and Mickey's burial, which start to cloud his mind until he hears Mickey's voice, urging him to fight back. Rocky gets back to his feet and with the whole neighbourhood, including Robert, cheering him on, Rocky utilities his street fighting knowledge to defeat Tommy. He confronts Duke, who threatens him with a lawsuit, but since Rocky and his family have been declared bankrupt, Rocky uppercuts Duke onto the hood of his own limousine, telling him "Sue me for what?".

Some time later, Rocky and Robert run up steps of the Philadelphia Museum of Art, where Rocky gives him a valuable possession of Mickey's - a cufflink that had been passed on to him by Rocky Marciano. Their relationship mended, they embrace and head to the museum together.

=== Rocky Balboa (2006) ===
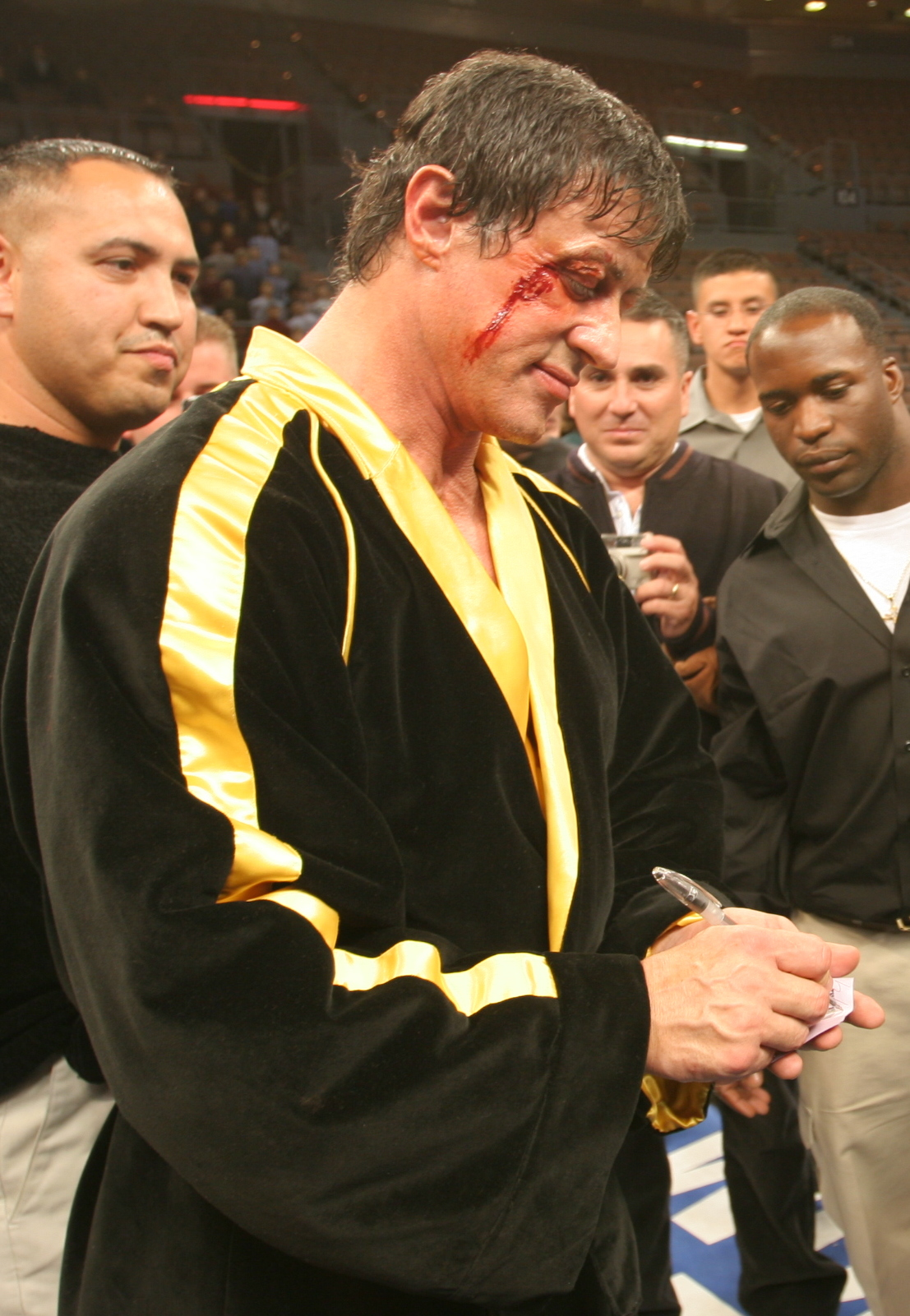
Stallone as Rocky in Rocky Balboa.

Fifteen years after the events of Rocky V, Rocky, now in his late fifties, runs a small but successful restaurant and bar called 'Adrian's', named after his wife who died of ovarian cancer four years prior in 2002. Rocky visits Adrian's graveside regularly and each year, on the anniversary of her death, takes a tour of the old places where their relationship began and blossomed: the now-closed J&M Tropical Fish pet shop where Adrian worked, the former site of the ice skating rink where they had their first date and Rocky's old apartment, where they fell in love. Rocky's son, Robert, is now working as a struggling mid-level corporate employee and has been drifting apart from his father over the years. Paulie reluctantly joins Rocky to commemorate the anniversaries of his sister's death.

An episode of ESPN's program, Then and Now, airs featuring a computer-simulated fight between Rocky (in his prime) and the current champion, Mason "The Line" Dixon (Antonio Tarver). The simulation result sees Rocky winning by knockout. Inspired by the simulation and feeling he still has some "stuff in the basement" to deal with, Rocky decides to return to the ring and applies to renew his boxing license. Though Rocky passes the required physical examination, the licensing committee denies his application, citing his advanced age and their moral duty to protect him from injury. Rocky responds to this with an impassioned speech of his own and the committee change their minds to renew his license.

Rocky's intentions were originally just to compete in small, local fights, but with the publicity of Rocky's return right on the heels of the embarrassing computer simulation, Dixon's promoters convince Rocky to challenge Dixon in an exhibition match at the MGM Grand in Las Vegas. Originally against fighting an aged Rocky, Dixon recognizes the opportunity to fight a legend and hopes to end any contentions that he has never had a truly great opponent or memorable match.

In the media, commentators dismiss Rocky's chances and the merits of the fight, assuming that it will be one-sided due to Rocky's age, despite their original excitement with Rocky's return to the ring, and their doubts regarding Dixon's ability. As news of the bout spreads, Robert makes an effort to discourage Rocky from fighting, blaming his own personal failings on his father's shadow, but Rocky rebukes him with some profound advice: to succeed in life, "it ain't about how hard you hit; it's about how hard you can get hit, and keep moving forward" and that blaming others would not help him. The next day, Rocky and Robert meet over Adrian's grave and reconcile, Robert having quit his job to be at Rocky's side. Rocky also reunites with Apollo's old trainer, Tony "Duke" Evers, who surmises that age and arthritis have sapped Rocky of any speed he once possessed. They decide to focus on Rocky's one major remaining weapon: his punching power.

When the match begins, Dixon's speed allows him to dominate Rocky at will, knocking him down twice early on. The tide turns when Dixon injures his hand while punching Rocky. This evens the playing field and allows Rocky to mount an offense, knocking Dixon down for the first time in the latter's career. As the final round begins Dixon catches Rocky with a strong blow, knocking down Rocky for the third time. As Rocky takes the knee, he looks to Robert in the corner and has flashbacks of his time with Adrian, remembering what he said to his son about never giving up. As the crowd chant his name, he rises to Dixon's surprise. The two exchange punches, but Rocky gets in the final blow before the bell rings.

As Dixon is announced the winner by split decision, Rocky thanks everyone in his group and, with Robert and Paulie by his side, they leave the ring as the audience gives him a heartfelt standing ovation. Dixon is finally recognized as being a warrior for fighting through every round and Rocky proves to the world that he is no joke, mirroring the ending of the first film.

After the fight, Rocky visits Adrian's grave and puts flowers on top, telling her, "Yo, Adrian, we did it", walking away from the grave and waving goodbye.

=== Creed (2015) ===
Nine years since his last fight in Vegas, Rocky is now in his late sixties, his brother-in-law Paulie having died in 2012. Rocky is visited at his restaurant by Donnie Creed (Michael B. Jordan) – Apollo Creed's illegitimate son. Donnie asks Rocky to train him, but Rocky is reluctant to return to boxing after his brain damage and one-off comeback. Days after his initial offer, Rocky recommends Donnie to his friend, Pete Sporino (Ritchie Coster), who currently runs Mighty Mick's Gym. After deep thought, Rocky agrees to take Donnie on as his new protégé.

Wanting to train in the old-school style, Donnie moves in with Rocky, staying in Paulie's old room. Donnie notices an old picture of Rocky and his son, Robert (an actual picture of Sylvester Stallone and a young Sage Stallone), Rocky reveals Robert had moved to Vancouver with his girlfriend, because of the difficulties he faced trying to be independent in Philadelphia, but checks in on his father every now and then. Pete, who wanted Rocky to be a part of his son, Leo's (Gabriel Rosado) team, challenges Donnie to fight Leo.

Instead of training at Mighty Mick's Gym, Rocky takes Donnie to train at the Front Street Gym, where he surprises Donnie with a corner team and apparel. Before the fight with Leo, Pete pulls Rocky aside to address the rumours of Donnie being Apollo's son, which Rocky confirms, and tells him that he should not speak of it to anyone else. After Donnie defeats Leo, the media heavily publicize the story of Apollo's infidelity, which catches the eye of Tommy Holiday (Graham McTavish), who is looking for a final opponent for light-heavyweight champion "Pretty" Ricky Conlan (Tony Bellew).

Whilst in training with Donnie, Rocky suddenly vomits and collapses. After a string of tests, Rocky is diagnosed with an early case of non-Hodgkin lymphoma, making him confront his own mortality. At first, Rocky is hesitant to the option of chemotherapy, as he remembers the pain Adrian experienced as she underwent treatment for ovarian cancer. After a bitter argument with Rocky, Donnie, greatly impacted by his coach's diagnosis, makes a pact with Rocky that they would fight their battles together, as Donnie prepares for his bout with Conlan and as Rocky undergoes treatment. As Donnie moves on in training, the effects of treatment begin to weaken Rocky, and Donnie acts as caregiver to Rocky, helping him get up and go to the bathroom, and uses the medical facility to his advantage; shadowboxing in the corridors and running up the stairs, passing doctors and nurses.

With the match taking place in Liverpool, Rocky teaches Donnie the hysterics that would ensue during the pre-fight press conference when Conlan tries to play mind games, and later helps Donnie's girlfriend Bianca (Tessa Thompson) surprise Donnie in his hotel room. During the match, Rocky stands in Donnie's corner as the night progresses. Before the final round, Rocky grows concerned about the injuries that Donnie has sustained and tells him he is stopping the fight. However, Donnie wants to prove that he is "not a mistake", which emotionally impacts Rocky. He tells Donnie he wishes he had the chance to thank Apollo after Mickey died, but it does not match his appreciation of Donnie's tenacity that motivated him in his battle against his illness. Adonis goes on to fight a competitive final round against Conlan, knocking him down near the round's conclusion, but ultimately loses the match by split decision in a manner that mirrors Rocky's initial bout against Apollo.

The film concludes with Donnie taking a frail, but improving, Rocky back to the steps of the Philadelphia Museum of Art, which Rocky says is his "most favorite place." Both look toward the Philadelphia skyline, remaining positive about their futures.

=== Creed II (2018) ===
Three years since his diagnosis, Rocky has recovered from cancer and coached Donnie to the WBC World Heavyweight championship. Rocky also gives Donnie advice in proposing to Bianca, using his proposal to Adrian as an example. Rocky struggles with contacting Robert, with whom he has, once again, an estranged relationship. One evening, Rocky drops by his restaurant and finds Ivan Drago waiting for him there. Drago tells him how his loss to Rocky 33 years earlier shattered his reputation, evicted him from Russia into Ukraine, and led to his divorce from his wife, Ludmilla. Drago threatens him by saying his son, Viktor (Florian Munteanu), has trained all his life and will "break" Donnie, issuing a fight challenge to Donnie earlier that morning. Rocky, clearly shaken, politely tells Drago to leave.

Wanting to avenge his father and forge his own legacy, Donnie decides to take up Viktor's challenge. Rocky refuses to support Donnie, noting that Viktor was raised in hate and has nothing to lose, which makes him dangerous. Despite Donnie's pleas, Rocky declines to train him out of fear and guilt from Apollo's fateful match years prior. Rocky watches Donnie and Viktor's match, where Viktor pummels Donnie repeatedly, and illegally hits Donnie while he is down, knocking him unconscious. Rocky turns off his television in horror at what he has witnessed, and travels to Brooklyn to visit a hospitalized Donnie, who lashes out at him.

With Donnie becoming detached from his family, Donnie's stepmother and Apollo's widow Mary Anne (Phylicia Rashad) contacts Rocky in helping him out of his slump. Donnie and Rocky make amends, and Rocky accompanies Donnie as Bianca gives birth to their daughter, Amara. When Amara is revealed to be deaf, Rocky advises him that they should not pity her condition, and instead treat her fully with their love.

Rocky and Tony "Little Duke" Evers (Wood Harris) take Donnie to a decrepit location in the California desert to retrain, describing it as a place where fighters are "reborn". Donnie undergoes a rigorous and brutal training regimen with Rocky, focusing on fighting from the inside and training his body to repeatedly absorb the heavy impact he knows he will receive from Viktor in the ring.

Rocky accompanies Donnie as they hold their rematch with Viktor in Moscow; Donnie withstands Viktor's blows and wins the match after Drago throws in the towel. Rocky does not join Donnie's celebration, saying that it is "his time," and watches in contentment from outside the ring.

Rocky later travels to Vancouver, where he reunites with Robert and meets his grandson Logan for the first time, remarking how similar he looks to Adrian.

=== Future ===
On July 23, 2019, in an interview with Variety, Stallone said that a Rocky direct sequel and prequel are in development. Producer Irwin Winkler said "We're very high on it" and those negotiations are underway for Stallone to write and star in the feature.

Stallone said the plot of the movie would be about Rocky befriending a young fighter, who is an undocumented immigrant. "Rocky meets a young, angry person who got stuck in this country when he comes to see his sister. He takes him into his life, and unbelievable adventures begin, and they wind up south of the border. It's very, very timely." Stallone said.

Stallone also said there are "ongoing discussions" about a Rocky prequel television series, which he hopes will land on a streaming service and the series will likely follow a young Rocky Balboa as professional boxing hopeful. Stallone said Winkler is hesitant on making the series saying that "There was some conflict there, yes. He felt in his mind that Rocky was primarily a feature film, and he did not see it as being translated for cable, so there was a big bone of contention."

In November 2023, Winkler confirmed that a fourth film in the Creed series was in active development, with Jordan returning as director. Jordan has also expressed interest in Stallone returning for a fourth film, believing there was always space for Rocky to return. Stallone similarly expressed interest in reprising his role in the sequel after having been absent in Creed III.

== Personal life ==
Balboa resides in Philadelphia, Pennsylvania, and married Adriana "Adrian" Pennino in 1976. They were married for 26 years. The two have a son, Robert Balboa Jr., who unlike his father goes by Robert.

After Adrian's death in 2002, Rocky and his brother-in-law Paulie lived together for a short time, then Paulie moved in with an unnamed girlfriend. Now living completely alone again, Rocky cannot come to terms with present-day living and constantly thinks about the past. With the help of Paulie and reunited long-time acquaintance Marie, Rocky begins to move on with his life and in the process restores his relationship with his only child, Robert. Rocky's relationship with Marie is established as platonic in the film, but a hint of romantic interest is revealed with a kiss on the lips the night before the last fight of his life.

Shortly after, Paulie dies and Rocky's relationship with his son becomes strained due to Robert distancing himself from any contact with him, leaving him alone again. A few years later, he meets Adonis Creed, the illegitimate son of his old friend, Apollo Creed, who asks him to come train him. After initially declining to, Rocky agreed and the two would have a father-son relationship. Eventually, Rocky learns he has been diagnosed with cancer and turns down treatment, seeing it as a chance to be reunited with his loved ones, although Adonis convinces him to keep fighting and change his decision about treatment, which Rocky does, saving him. When Adonis's wife, Bianca, gave birth to a daughter, Rocky was named her godfather.

For years, Rocky attempted to reestablish contact with his estranged son, Robert, but never went through with it. However, after helping Adonis conquer Viktor Drago, Rocky decides to visit his son in Vancouver where they finally begin to reconcile and meets his grandson, Logan, who bears a striking resemblance to Adrian.

== Character origin ==
The name, iconography, and fighting style of Rocky Balboa was inspired by the legendary heavyweight champion Rocky Marciano from Brockton, Massachusetts and by the five-time world champion Roberto 'Manos de Piedra (Hands of Stone)' Durán, from Panama, where the Balboa is the official currency. Balboa was also inspired by other fighting legends: Joe Frazier, for his Philadelphia origin, training methods, and victory against Muhammad Ali (the inspiration for Apollo Creed), and Jake LaMotta, for his Italian-American urban roots, ability to absorb many blows, and his rivalry with Sugar Ray Robinson, which heavily resembled Rocky and Apollo's. However, it was Chuck Wepner who inspired the movie and Balboa's underdog personality.

Early in my acting career I realized the only way I would ever prove myself was to create my own role in my own script. On my 29th birthday, I had $106 in the bank. My best birthday present was a sudden revelation that I had to write the kind of screenplay that I personally enjoyed seeing. I relished stories of heroism, great love, dignity, and courage, dramas of people rising above their stations, taking life by the throat and not letting go until they succeeded. But I had so many ideas in my head, I couldn't focus on any one. To cheer myself up, I took the last of my entertainment money and went to see the Ali-Wepner fight on closed circuit TV. Chuck Wepner, a battling, bruising club fighter who had never made the big time, was having his shot. It wasn't at all regarded as a serious battle. But as the fight progressed, this miracle unfolded. He hung in there. People went absolutely crazy. Wepner was knocked out in the 15th and final round, almost lasting the distance. We had witnessed an incredible triumph of the human spirit and we loved it. That night, Rocky Balboa was born. People looked on him as the all-American tragedy, a man without much mentality and few social graces. But he has deep emotion and spirituality and good patriotism. And he has a good nature, although nature has not been particularly good to him. I have always seen him as a 20th Century gladiator in a pair of sneakers. Like so many of us, he is out of sync with the times. To all this, I injected doses of my own personal life, of my frustration at not getting anywhere.

— Sylvester Stallone

== Boxing style ==
Rocky Balboa fights as a southpaw (left-handed). In the second film, against Apollo Creed, he comes out orthodox, primarily to protect his injured right eye but also to lull Apollo into a false sense of security, with Mickey intending for him to switch back to southpaw late in the last round; Rocky initially refuses before the final round, saying "No tricks! I ain't switching!" but then relents and suddenly switches back to his left in the middle of the round, catching Apollo off-guard and punishing him en route to a knockout. The real reason for this is Sylvester Stallone tore his pectoral muscles in training, but the idea was probably taken from the great southpaw boxer "Marvelous" Marvin Hagler, who would sometimes come out orthodox to confuse opponents.

Rocky was an all-or-nothing brawler prior to his first bout with Creed, fighting with poor technique and regularly coming in out of shape, which resulted in his mixed record and low status as a club fighter; however, under the training of Mickey, he began to develop his boxing skills and mastered his technique, while also greatly improving his physical health. During his reign as world champion, he became a class hybrid fighter, possessing the qualities of an inside fighter, brawler, and swarmer. With the exception of his rematch against Clubber Lang (where he fights as an outside fighter), he often advances quickly upon his opponents, driving them into the ropes in order to attack the body. Balboa's best attribute is without question his near superhuman ability to absorb a multitude of heavy blows without being knocked out, an attribute he often employs on purpose to wear down his opponents and sacrifice defensive to land his own punches.

Due to this strategy, Balboa opts to keep his hands lower, in a striking position, rather than blocking. He also works to capitalize on shifts in momentum during fights, utilizing his raw power for body attacks. Within the franchise's world, he is acknowledged for this fighting style, with opponents sustaining internal bleeding and broken ribs.

After going two rounds with Balboa, Ivan Drago told his trainer (in Russian), "He's not human, he's like a piece of iron." Mason Dixon once remarked about Balboa: "That guy's got bricks in his gloves." These qualities, in concert, helped land him a high percentage of knockout victories over the course of his career.

== Honors ==
Rocky Balboa was named the 7th greatest movie hero by the American Film Institute on their 100 Years... 100 Heroes and Villains list. Additionally, he was ranked No. 36 on Empire's compilation of The 100 Greatest Movie Characters. Premiere magazine ranked Rocky Balboa No. 64 on their list of The 100 Greatest Movie Characters of All Time.

The Rocky character is immortalised with a bronze statue erected near the Rocky Steps at the Philadelphia Museum of Art recalling the famous scene from the original Rocky movie.

In 2007, a Rocky statue was erected in the Serbian village of Žitiste.

In 2011, Sylvester Stallone was inducted into the International Boxing Hall of Fame for his work on the Rocky Balboa character, having "entertained and inspired boxing fans from around the world". Additionally, Stallone was awarded the Boxing Writers Association of America award for "Lifetime Cinematic Achievement in Boxing." Inspired by people criticizing an actor being inducted in the Hall of Fame for playing a fictitious athlete, in 2014 the Fictitious Athlete Hall of Fame was launched with Rocky Balboa as its Inaugural Induction.

A poll of former heavyweight champions and boxing writers ranked Balboa as the best boxer in the film series.

== Merchandising ==
Hasbro intended to license Rocky and make him a member of the G.I. Joe toyline, as they had with wrestler Sgt. Slaughter and began negotiations with Stallone's representation. Marvel Comics' G.I. Joe: Order of Battle profile book came out during the negotiations and included Rocky as a current Joe member, specializing in hand-to-hand combat training and an example of what it means to persevere under seemingly impossible odds. Balboa also appeared on the cover of the issue. In the meantime, Stallone's agents made a deal with Coleco to produce Rambo figures in order to compete with the G.I. Joe line. Hasbro, who was working on a toy prototype at the time, decided to end negotiations at that point. Marvel ran a retraction in the third issue of the limited-run series indicating that the character was not, and never had been, a part of G.I. Joe. The trade paperback edition of the series, published in July 1987, omitted the page featuring Balboa altogether.

Between 2006 and 2009, Jakks Pacific released six series of figures, each focused on one of the movies in the film series. Additionally, two "Best Of" series were released, as well as several collector's box sets, boxing ring playsets, and limited edition exclusive figures.

== See also ==
- List of boxing films

== Notes ==
Achievements
Preceded by Apollo Creed	World Heavyweight Champion; November 25, 1976 – August 15, 1981 (In-universe)	Succeeded by Clubber Lang
Preceded by Clubber Lang	World Heavyweight Champion; July 6, 1982 – January 1, 1986 (In-universe); Retired	Vacant Title next held by Union Cane
