= Sinners (2025 film) =

Horror film by Ryan Coogler

- Theatrical release poster
- Directed by: Ryan Coogler
- Written by: Ryan Coogler
- Produced by: Zinzi Coogler; Sev Ohanian; Ryan Coogler
- Starring: Michael B. Jordan; Hailee Steinfeld; Miles Caton; Jack O'Connell; Wunmi Mosaku; Jayme Lawson; Omar Benson Miller; Li Jun Li; Delroy Lindo
- Cinematography: Autumn Durald Arkapaw
- Edited by: Michael P. Shawver
- Music by: Ludwig Göransson
- Production company: Proximity Media
- Distributed by: Warner Bros. Pictures
- Release dates: April 3, 2025 (AMC Lincoln Square); April 18, 2025 (United States)
- Running time: 137 minutes
- Country: United States
- Language: English
- Budget: $90–100 million
- Box office: $371.6 million

Sinners is a 2025 American horror film (Note: Described as a genre-defying film, Sinners is a period drama that incorporates Southern Gothic, gangster, supernatural horror, and musical elements.) produced, written, and directed by Ryan Coogler. Set in 1932 in the Mississippi Delta, it stars Michael B. Jordan in dual roles as criminal twin brothers who return to their hometown in the Jim Crow South, where they are confronted by a vampiric threat. The film co-stars Hailee Steinfeld, Miles Caton (in his film debut), Jack O'Connell, Wunmi Mosaku, Jayme Lawson, Omar Benson Miller, Li Jun Li and Delroy Lindo.

Coogler began developing Sinners through his production company Proximity Media, with Jordan cast in the lead role. The project was announced in January 2024, and after a bidding war, Warner Bros. Pictures acquired distribution rights the following month. Additional roles were cast in April. Principal photography took place from April to July 2024. Longtime Coogler collaborator Ludwig Göransson composed the film's score and served as an executive producer.

Sinners premiered on April 3, 2025, at AMC Lincoln Square in New York City, and was theatrically released in United States on April 18, 2025. It received critical acclaim and was a commercial success, grossing over $371 million worldwide against a budget of $90 million. The National Board of Review and the American Film Institute listed it among the top ten films of 2025. Sinners garnered many accolades, including a record-breaking 16 nominations at the 98th Academy Awards, winning four: Best Actor (Jordan), Best Original Screenplay, Best Cinematography (making Autumn Durald Arkapaw the first woman to win the award), and Best Original Score. It also received 13 BAFTA Awards nominations, winning three, including Best Original Screenplay; four Critics' Choice Awards; two Golden Globe Awards; two Actor Awards (including Outstanding Performance by a Cast in a Motion Picture); and a historic 18 nominations and 13 wins at the 57th NAACP Image Awards, including the NAACP Image Award for Outstanding Motion Picture.

== Plot ==
In 1932, identical twins and World War I veterans Elijah "Smoke" and Elias "Stack" Moore return to Clarksdale, Mississippi, after seven years in Chicago working for the Chicago mob. Using money stolen from criminal syndicates, they purchase an abandoned sawmill from the landowner Hogwood to open a juke joint for the local Black community. Their younger cousin Sammie, a singer and guitarist, joins them despite his pastor father Jedidiah's warnings about blues music being sinful.

Smoke and Stack recruit the musician Delta Slim as a performer, the local Chinese shopkeeper couple Grace and Bo Chow as suppliers, the field worker Cornbread as a bouncer, and Smoke's estranged wife, Annie, as a cook. Annie believes her Hoodoo practices kept the twins safe, but Smoke is skeptical after Annie failed to prevent the death of their infant daughter. Stack runs into his white-passing ex-girlfriend Mary, whom he abandoned to protect her from the White community. Elsewhere, the Irish-immigrant vampire Remmick shelters from Choctaw vampire hunters with a married Klansmen couple, whom he turns into vampire thralls.

Sammie, Delta Slim, and Pearline—a singer Sammie becomes enamored with —perform at the joint’s opening night. Unbeknownst to Sammie, his music summons spirits of performers from the past and future. The performance also attracts Remmick and his vampires, who offer money and music in exchange for entry. Smoke, suspicious, refuses. Smoke and Stack realize that their patrons' reliance on company scrip makes the joint's profitability impossible. Believing that outside income is necessary, Mary goes outside and talks to Remmick, and is turned into a vampire thrall by him. She then seduces and fatally bites Stack. A shocked Smoke shoots Mary, but she is unaffected and escapes. Outside, Cornbread is turned into a thrall as well.

Smoke closes the joint early; as the patrons and Bo leave, the vampires turn them. Stack revives as a vampire, but flees after Annie repels him with pickled garlic juice. Annie realizes their assailants are vampires and tells the survivors how to deter and kill them. Although Remmick and his vampires share a hive mind, their personalities remain intact.

Still unable to enter the joint unless invited, Remmick threatens to go to the Chows' home and turn their daughter Lisa. He then promises to leave the others in exchange for Sammie, whose musical skills could summon the spirits of his lost community. He, Stack and Mary try to entice the survivors with the freedom of vampirism, revealing that Hogwood heads the local Klan and plans to attack the joint at dawn, but the survivors still refuse.

Grace, enraged and wanting to kill the vampires before they turn others, invites them into the joint, and a fight ensues. Grace, Bo, Annie, and Delta Slim are killed; Mary, devastated by Annie's death, flees, and Remmick turns Pearline. Smoke incapacitates Stack, then assists Sammie in incapacitating Remmick, who is incinerated along with the horde by the light of the sunrise. Smoke sends Sammie home before he kills Hogwood and his men, but is fatally shot. He reunites with Annie and their daughter after dying. Meanwhile, Sammie disregards his father's pleas to seek salvation and travels to Chicago.

In 1992, Sammie is a successful blues musician and is visited by an ageless Stack and Mary at his local blues club. Stack reveals that Smoke was simply unable to kill his own brother, and let Stack live in exchange for him leaving Sammie alone. Stack offers to turn Sammie to avoid his impending death, but Sammie declines, satisfied with his life. Sammie then performs a song for them, as they remained fans of his music over the years. As they leave, Sammie admits that despite still being haunted by that night, it was the greatest day of his life until the sun went down. Stack wistfully agrees, since it was the last time he saw Smoke or the sun, and the only time they were all truly free.

== Cast ==
- Michael B. Jordan in a dual role as the Smokestack Twins:
  - Elijah "Smoke" Moore, the older, more serious, pragmatic, and straightforward twin
  - Elias "Stack" Moore, the younger, more cheerful and charming twin
- Hailee Steinfeld as Mary, Stack's passé blanc ex-girlfriend
- Miles Caton as Samuel "Sammie" Moore (a.k.a. "Preacherboy"), Smoke and Stack's cousin, a sharecropper and aspiring blues musician
  - Buddy Guy as elderly Sammie
- Jack O'Connell as Remmick, an Irish vampire
- Wunmi Mosaku as Annie, Smoke's estranged wife and a Hoodoo practitioner
- Jayme Lawson as Pearline, a married singer with whom Sammie becomes smitten
- Omar Miller as Cornbread, a sharecropper and bouncer
- Delroy Lindo as Delta Slim, an old town harmonica player and musical legend
- Peter Dreimanis as Bert, a local KKK member, Hogwood's nephew and Joan's husband
- Lola Kirke as Joan, Bert's wife
- Li Jun Li as Grace Chow, Bo's wife and a shopkeeper
- Saul Williams as Jedidiah Moore, a pastor, Sammie's father, and the twins' uncle
- Yao as Bo Chow, Grace's husband and a shopkeeper
- David Maldonado as Hogwood, the local KKK leader and Bert's uncle
- Helena Hu as Lisa Chow, Bo and Grace's daughter
- Andrene Ward-Hammond as Ruthie Moore, Sammie's mother
- Nathaniel Arcand as Chayton, a Choctaw vampire hunter
- Emonie Ellison as Therise, Cornbread's pregnant wife

== Production ==
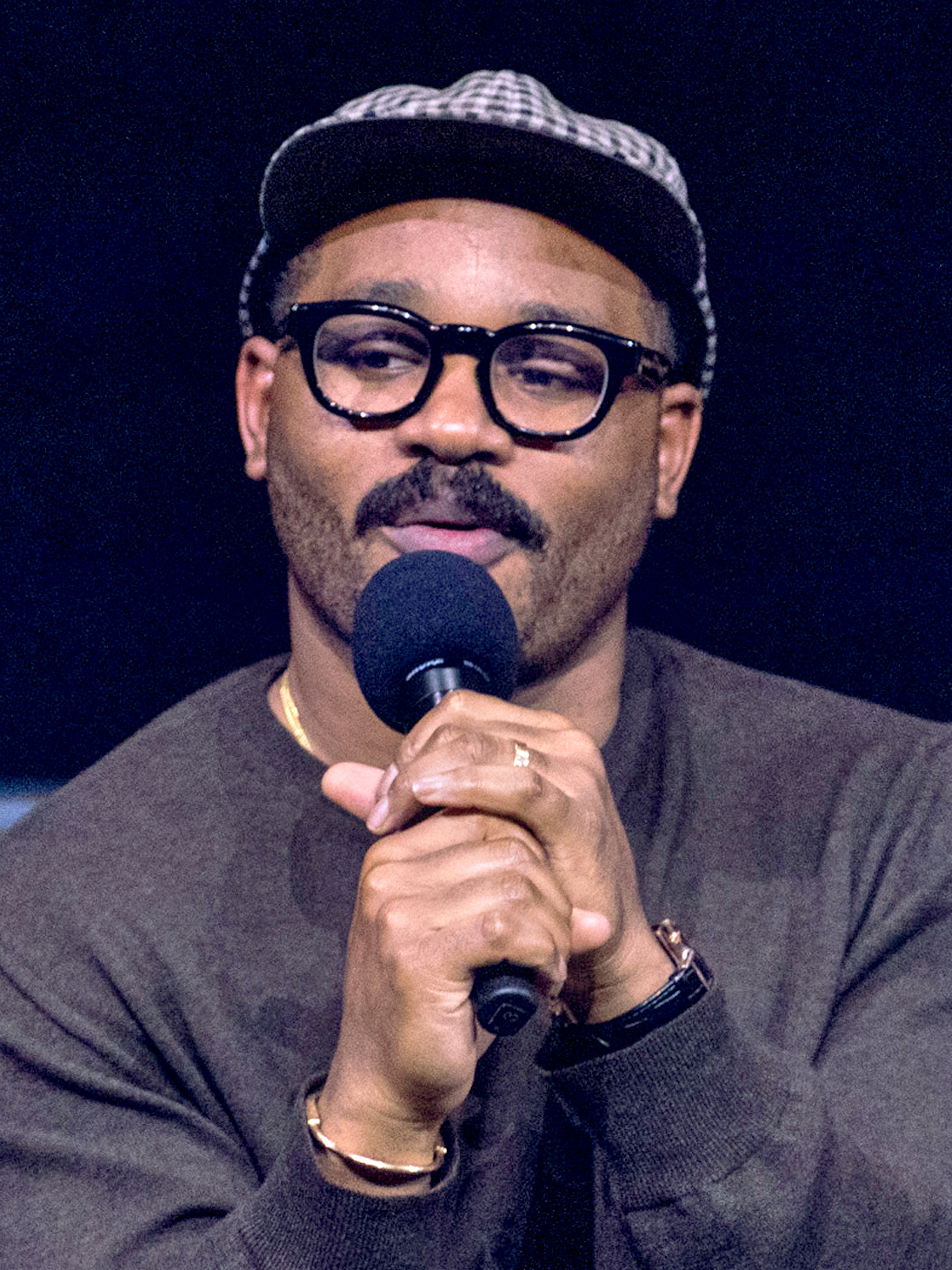
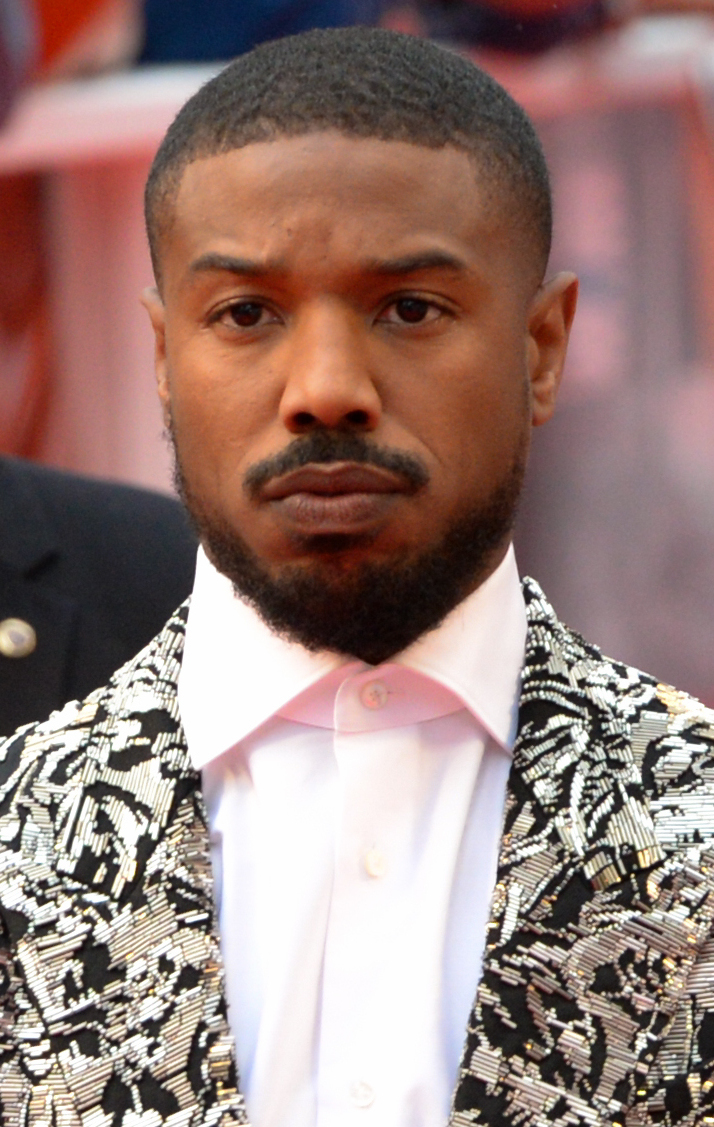
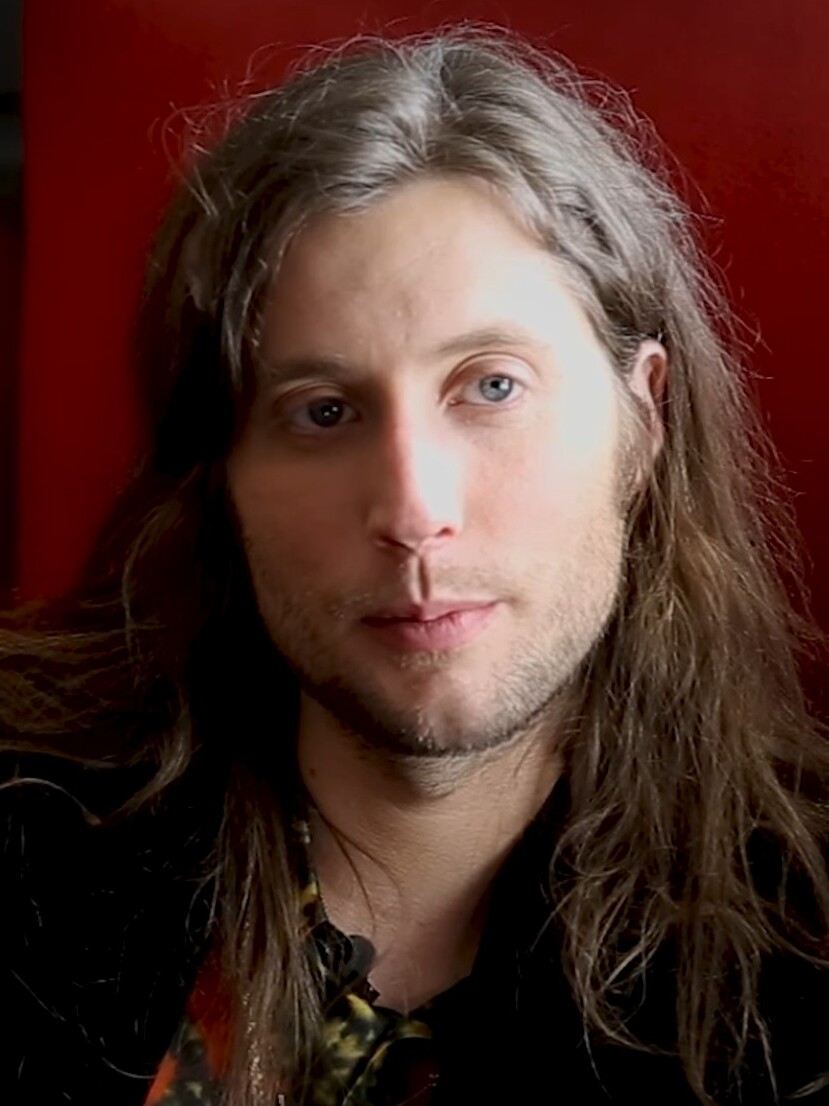
Sinners is the fifth collaboration between writer-director Ryan Coogler (pictured in 2025), actor Michael B. Jordan (2019), and composer Ludwig Göransson (2018), who all received Academy Awards for their work on the film.

In January 2024, an untitled period film from writer, director and producer Ryan Coogler was reported to be in development through his production company Proximity Media, with longtime collaborator Michael B. Jordan cast in the lead role. Sony Pictures, Warner Bros. Pictures, and Universal Pictures were in a bidding war to acquire the distribution rights to the film, which carried a budget of around $90 million. According to The Hollywood Reporter, Warner Bros. greenlit the film with a production budget of $80 million, but the final budget climbed to $100 million. In exchange for the distribution rights to the film, Coogler was asking studios for first-dollar gross, final cut privilege, and ownership of the film twenty-five years after its release. The following month, Warner Bros. won the distribution rights to the film by acceding to Coogler's terms.

In April 2024, Jack O'Connell was cast as the film's villain. Delroy Lindo, Jayme Lawson, Omar Benson Miller, Hailee Steinfeld, Li Jun Li and Lola Kirke were cast in undisclosed roles. Wunmi Mosaku was cast as Smoke's love interest. Yao, Miles Caton, Peter Dreimanis, and Christian Robinson were added the next month. Halsey would audition for the role that went to Steinfeld. Machine Gun Kelly was offered the opportunity to audition for the role that went to Peter Dreimanis, but declined because he was not comfortable saying "nigger".

Principal photography began in New Orleans on April 14, 2024, under the working title Grilled Cheese, and wrapped on July 17. It was shot by cinematographer Autumn Durald Arkapaw on 65 mm film using a combination of IMAX 15-perf and Ultra Panavision 70 cameras and scenes thus alternate between the 1.43:1 and 2.76:1 aspect ratios. In shooting this movie, Arkapaw became the first female director of photography to shoot any movie on large format IMAX film. Kodak created a 65mm version of their Ektachrome 100D 5294 film stock specifically for the production, where it was used for a flashback sequence. The production spent $67.6 million on-location in Louisiana. The film's allocated budget was reported to have ultimately risen to around $100 million. The film's production designer Hannah Beachler acknowledged that the way the church in the film was designed included crossed beams that made the "Wakanda Forever" gesture and paid homage to the late Chadwick Boseman, star of the Marvel Cinematic Universe (MCU) film Black Panther (2018).

Industrial Light & Magic (ILM), Storm Studios, Rising Sun Pictures, Base FX, Baraboom Studios, Light VFX and Outpost VFX provided the film's visual effects. For the crew to be able to show Smoke and Stack together, they used body-doubles and split screen effects. A motion-controlled camera repeated the same movements for multiple takes, which allowed Micheal B. Jordan's performances to be combined into a single shot. Some of the film's costumes were originally designed by Ruth E. Carter for the planned MCU film Blade, but when production on it stalled, Carter was approached by Coogler to work on his film. Instead, Carter used contrasting hats to distinguish the twins. Smoke in a blue flat cap and Stack in a red fedora. Given both films' shared time period and similar settings within the Prohibition era, Carter was able to reuse her research for Sinners and was allowed by Marvel Studios to buy costumes she made originally for Blade to be used on Sinners. Marvel Studios president Kevin Feige said the studio no longer needed the costumes after deciding to move Blade from a period setting, so they were happy for Carter to use them on Coogler's film.

To accurately portray the historical Chinese community of the Mississippi Delta, the filmmakers used Dolly Li as a consultant. She made the documentary The Untold Story of America’s Southern Chinese for Al Jazeera Plus in 2017.

=== Influences ===
Coogler cited the films of Quentin Tarantino, Jordan Peele, Christopher Nolan (who is given an on-screen special thanks credit), Francis Ford Coppola, Brian De Palma, Spike Lee and the Metallica song "One" as sources of inspiration. He stated that Robert Rodriguez was a filmmaker he idolized growing up and took inspiration from two of his films in particular when coming up with the idea for Sinners: From Dusk Till Dawn (1996) and The Faculty (1998). Coogler also cited an array of other films as influences, including the Coen Brothers' No Country for Old Men (2007), Inside Llewyn Davis (2013), and Fargo (1996), as well as John Carpenter's The Thing (1982). He also noted that the Disney Channel Original Movie The Luck of the Irish (2001) was a major influence. Another key influence for the filmmaker was Rod Serling's The Twilight Zone (1959–1964), with his favorite episode being "The Last Rites of Jeff Myrtlebank". The biggest non-cinematic influence was Stephen King's novel 'Salem's Lot (1975).

=== Themes ===
Coogler spoke about the parallels drawn in the film between African Americans, the Irish, and the Choctaw, noting the historical intermingling of these cultures and its influence on their musical traditions. He cited Delta blues musician Charley Patton, who Coogler says was "likely part Choctaw," mentioned as the original owner of the guitar played by Sammie.

Armenian-American film producer Sev Ohanian observes that the film is personal, rooted in Coogler's own heritage and cultural identity. He noted that Coogler drew heavily from his family history and musical passions, even describing the screenwriting process as a spiritual experience where he felt guided by the presence of his ancestors.

Coogler also said that the character of Remmick, who is Irish, identifies with the black characters because of "the connection between what we experienced – we being African Americans… forcibly removed from the continent of Africa… and the experience of the Irish people being forced to work land that has immeasurable abundance and wealth, but being denied that. So I mean, the connections between the two cultures are really obvious to spot."

== Music ==
Coogler's frequent collaborator Ludwig Göransson worked on the soundtrack of Sinners. Göransson described Sinners as a personal and ambitious score, reflecting his own musical journey. He drew inspiration from blues music and performed the score on a 1932 Dobro Cyclops resonator guitar, the same one Sammie carries throughout the film. According to producer Ohanian, the movie serves as a dedication to Coogler's uncle James, the eldest male in his family and a native of the Mississippi region. Through lifelong conversations about the blues, James helped Coogler develop a personal connection to the history and culture of the era. During pre-production, Coogler sent Göransson recordings from the 1930s and 1940s, particularly those of Robert Johnson and Tommy Johnson. Göransson and Coogler insisted that Göransson's wife Serena Göransson produce the songs. A classically trained violinist, she said the southern Black music had to be handled with care and expert consultation, and said she felt like a "steward" of the music.

The couple worked with Lawrence "Boo" Mitchell, a blues producer who owns Royal Studios, and visited the B.B. King Museum and local juke joints in Clarksdale and Indianola with him for inspiration. The Göranssons and Mitchell recorded the songs at Royal Studios over five days with musicians such as Alvin Youngblood Hart and Cedric Burnside. Mitchell also brought in other blues musicians such as Brittany Howard, Raphael Saadiq, Bobby Rush, Christone "Kingfish" Ingram and Buddy Guy (who also appears in the film). The Göranssons rented a studio converted from a church in New Orleans, and worked with the supporting cast of Jack O'Connell, Lola Kirke, Peter Dreimanis and Jayme Lawson, rehearsing their songs multiple times. Much of the film was recorded live on set, with the cast members performing alongside other blues musicians. Hailee Steinfeld wrote and recorded the original song "Dangerous" for the film.

Unlike most Warner Bros. films, which have soundtracks released through the company's in-house label WaterTower Music, the soundtrack and score to Sinners were released through Sony Music labels. The soundtrack was released on Sony Masterworks on April 18, 2025, the same day as the film, featuring 22 tracks performed by an array of blues musicians, alongside the cast members. The lead single "Sinners", performed by Rod Wave, was released two weeks prior.

== Release ==
=== Theatrical ===
Sinners was released in the United States and Canada on April 18, 2025. It was previously scheduled for release on March 7, 2025, but was delayed to April (swapping dates with Mickey 17) to allow for more time needed in post-production due to the scarcity of film stock labs for the project, which heavily used film cameras. In addition to a standard digital release, the film also received 10 IMAX 70 mm prints, and 5 standard 70 mm prints.

In late May, the film was screened in Clarksdale, Mississippi, where it is set. Clarksdale did not have a working movie theater, but the civic auditorium hosted six showings, introduced by Coogler, Göransson, and other filmmakers. The town also hosted panels and Q&As related to the film over the three-day weekend festival. AMC Theaters nationwide scheduled screenings of the film on Juneteenth at discounted prices.

=== Home media ===
Sinners was released on digital streaming on June 3, 2025, and on 4K Ultra HD Blu-ray, Blu-ray, and DVD on July 8, 2025. It premiered on HBO Max on July 4, 2025. Warner Bros. announced that Sinners would also be available to stream on HBO Max with interpretation in Black American Sign Language (BASL); the company stated that it was the first film to ever be offered by a streaming service with BASL. The film became available to stream on Amazon Prime Video starting December 26, 2025.

== Reception ==
=== Box office ===
Sinners grossed $280 million in the United States and Canada, and $91.6 million in other territories, for a worldwide total of $371.6 million.

Some publications said the film needed to gross $170–185 million to break even when factoring in its production budget, Coogler's first-dollar gross, premium video-on-demand, and streaming deals with Prime and Netflix. Other industry sources placed the break-even point at $200–225 million, with Puck going as high as $300 million, because of the film's budget, estimated $50–60 million marketing spend, and the presumption that theaters keep half of ticket sales. Many fans of the film and industry figures like Ben Stiller criticized media coverage, specifically pieces from Variety, The New York Times, and Business Insider, that seemed to downplay the film's success by focusing on its box office performance, Coogler's salary, and speculation about its profitability. In September 2025, Variety reported the film was expected to make a theatrical profit of around $60 million.

In the United States and Canada, Sinners was projected to gross $30–40 million from 3,308 theaters in its opening weekend. The film made $19.2 million on its first day, including an estimated $4.7 million from Thursday night previews. It went on to debut to $48 million, topping projections to finish first at the box office, upsetting Warner Bros.' own holdover A Minecraft Movie, which grossed $40.5 million in its third weekend. The opening marked the best start for an original film since Jordan Peele's Us ($71 million in 2019), and the first time a studio had two films make more than $40 million each over a single weekend since 2009. Walk-up business, particularly on Saturday, and word-of-mouth contributed substantially to the opening, with 61% of attendees buying their ticket the same day. Premium large format and IMAX screenings made up 45% of the opening. Exit polling indicated that 47% of moviegoers bought tickets because of Jordan, 40% for Coogler, and 45% because of positive word-of-mouth, and that 64% of attendees were 35 or younger, with 46% being 25–34 and 2% under 18. The audience was 49% Black, 27% Caucasian, 14% Latino and Hispanic, 6% Asian, and 4% Native American/other. Sinners also made $15.4 million from 71 international markets, for a global opening weekend of $61 million.

Word-of-mouth momentum helped Sinners earn the second-best Monday haul for an R-rated horror film at $7.8 million, behind It ($8.6 million in 2017). It ended its first week ahead of the seven-day totals of The Conjuring ($61.7 million in 2013) and Get Out ($49.8 million in 2017) with $77.5 million. Sinners exceeded second weekend projections ($19.2–24 million) to outgross new releases and top the box office again with $45.7 million. Its 4.9% drop is the third-best second-weekend performance for a film that debuted to more than $40 million after Shrek (+0.3% in 2001) and Avatar (−1.8% in 2009) and the second-best second weekend for an R-rated horror film after It ($60.1 million). Deadline noted that the film's audience had broadened in its second weekend, with women making up 56% of patrons (up from 43% in the first weekend) and those under 25 years of age comprising 34% (up from 20%). The film also made $13.5 million over that frame from 71 foreign markets, a total attributed to word-of-mouth and strong holds in several countries.

After ceding its premium-large format and IMAX screens to newcomer Thunderbolts*, Sinners achieved the best third weekend for a horror film with $33 million (a 28% drop), topping It ($29.7 million). Helped by "exceptional holds" in Latin America and Europe, it also made $10.4 million internationally over the weekend. Sinners crossed $200 million domestically in its fourth weekend, becoming the first original film to do so since Coco in 2017.

=== Critical response ===
Metacritic review
breakdown (unweighted)

Positive
51 (93%)
Mixed
4 (7%)
Negative
0 (0%)

On the review aggregator website Rotten Tomatoes, 97% of 439 critics' reviews are positive, with an average rating of 8.8/10. The website's consensus reads: "A rip-roaring fusion of masterful visual storytelling and toe-tapping music, writer-director Ryan Coogler's first original blockbuster reveals the full scope of his singular imagination." Metacritic, which uses a weighted average, assigned the film a score of 84 out of 100, based on 55 critics, indicating "universal acclaim". Audiences polled by CinemaScore gave the film an average grade of "A" on an A+ to F scale (the highest grade for a horror film in 35 years), while those surveyed by PostTrak gave it a 92% overall positive score, with 84% saying they would definitely recommend the film.

Reviewers praised Coogler's vision and the film's cinematography. Rolling Stone critic A.A. Dowd commented that the director was "swinging wide and far beyond the boundaries of franchise fare", while Wendy Ide of The Observer wrote that "Coogler's assurance and vision holds everything together." Ann Hornaday of The Washington Post cited Coogler's "impressive self-awareness", as well as Jordan, Mosaku, Lindo, and Caton's performances. A number of critics suggested that the film's more grounded first half was superior to the supernaturally driven later acts. Peter Travers of ABC News declared Sinners the best movie yet released in 2025, writing that it was Coogler and Jordan's "best and most daring work yet".

In a more negative review, The Wall Street Journal's Zachary Barnes praised Jordan's performance, but wrote that Sinners did not pull together thematically, arguing that "Mr. Coogler's imagination remains limited by the conventions of Marveldom." Sho Baraka of Christianity Today notes: "Just be aware that [...] the bawdy themes will tutor you in practices that would make your marriage counselor blush. [...] Sinners does speak frankly about the bloodsucking perversion of religion in the United States. But the same plantation folks who suffered hypocrisy knew of a healer who gave joy [that] spawned spirituals, which gave birth to blues." Bishop Robert Barron, writing for The Free Press, shared similar sentiments towards the film's stance on Christianity.

Several critics drew comparisons between the film and Robert Rodriguez's 1996 action-horror film From Dusk till Dawn. Coogler cited From Dusk Till Dawn as an inspiration for the film, but compared it more to The Faculty (1998), another film by Rodriguez.

The music of Sinners was widely praised by critics, who noted its centrality to the film's story. David Ehrlich of IndieWire wrote: "This isn't the first time that a Ludwig Göransson score has been inextricable from the texture of a Ryan Coogler movie, but Sinners opens with someone talking about a kind of music 'so pure it can pierce the veil between life and death, past and future' [...] and then proceeds to show us exactly what that sounds like." Mae Abdulbaki of Screen Rant stated: "The music alone, from the songs played by the characters to the score by Ludwig Göransson, takes the film to another level." Amy Nicholson of Los Angeles Times described the score as "phenomenal", adding that it is music "you've never heard and yet it seems to come from deep inside our pop-cultural soul." David Rooney of The Hollywood Reporter described it as "flavorful [...] with the score and the blues performances fusing together to intoxicating effect." Barnes, of The Wall Street Journal, called Göransson's score "a twangy marvel of genre-crossing interpolation".

=== Accolades ===
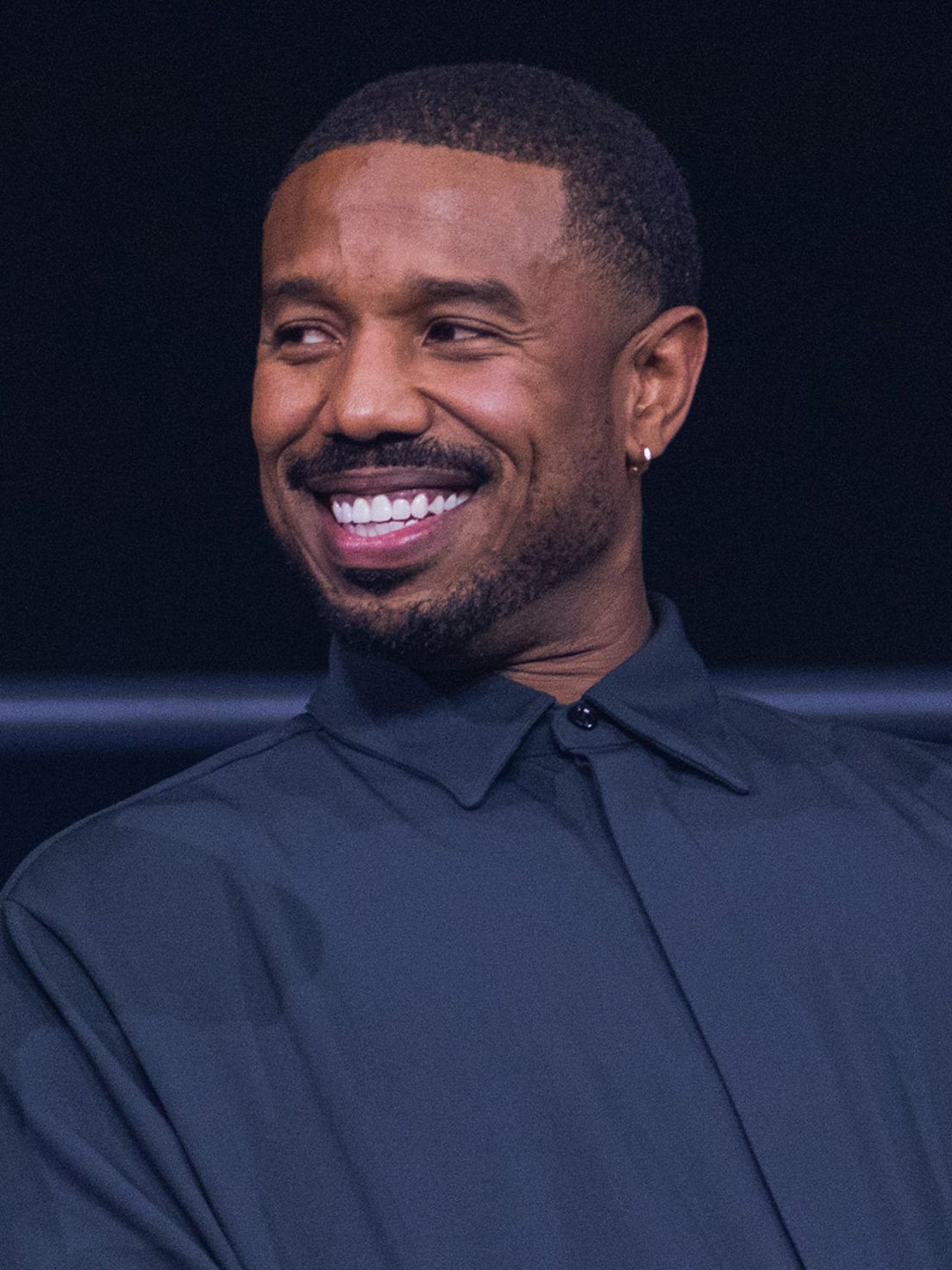
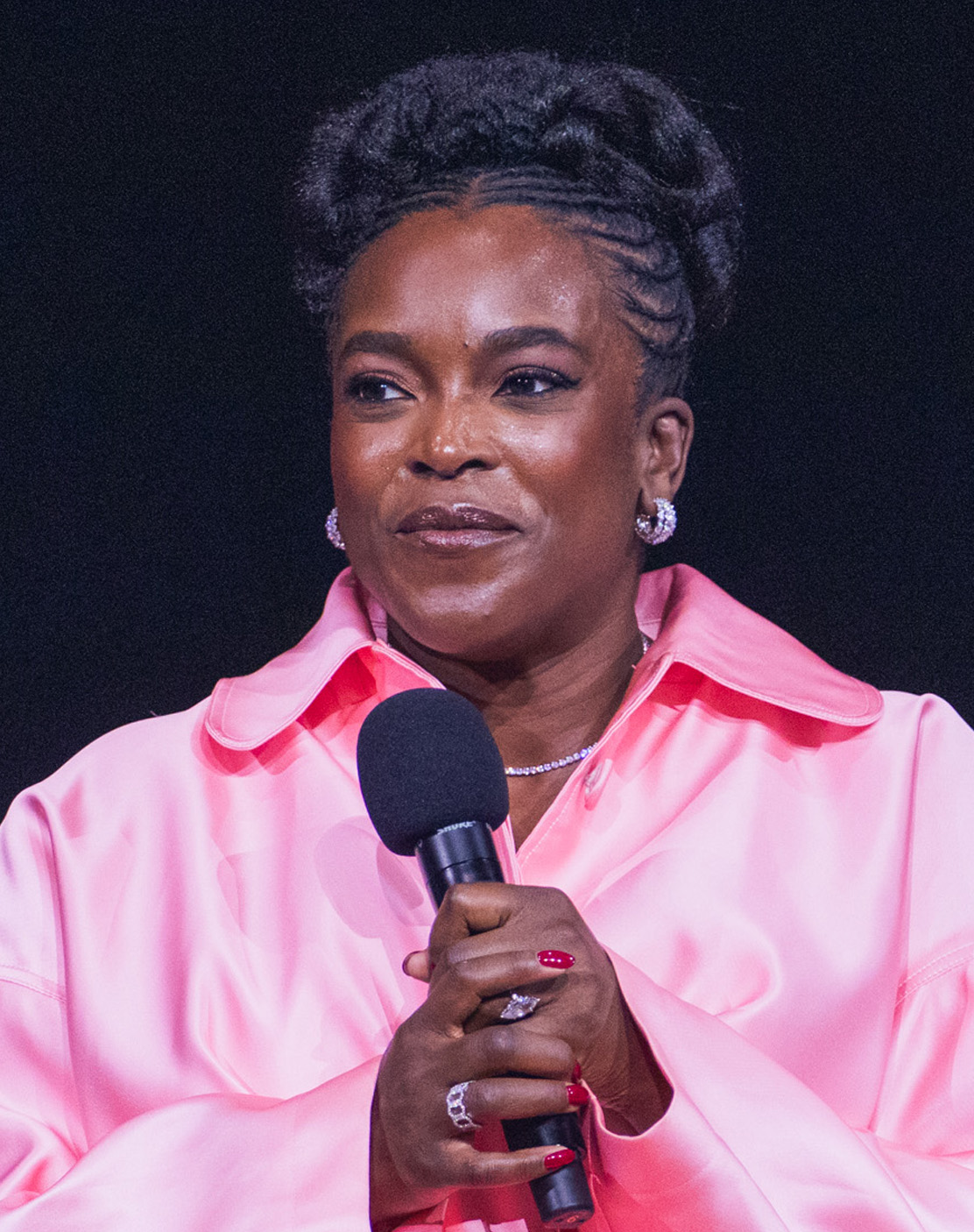
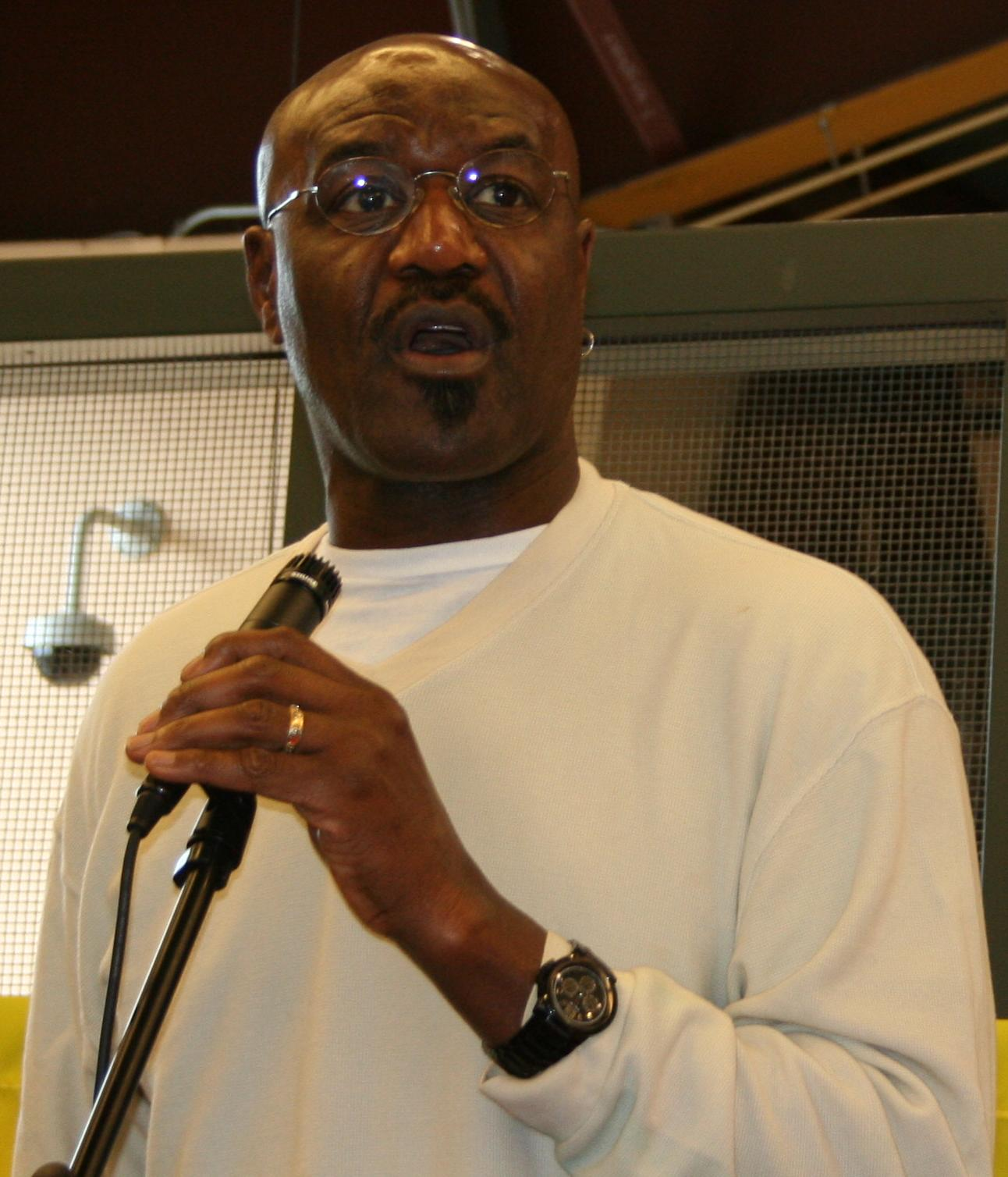
The performances of Michael B. Jordan, Wunmi Mosaku, and Delroy Lindo garnered widespread acclaim, earning them Academy Award nominations for Best Actor, Best Supporting Actress, and Best Supporting Actor, respectively, with Jordan winning his category.

Sinners received numerous awards and nominations, with recognition for its direction, screenplay, performances, cinematography and music, amongst others. It received seven nominations at the 83rd Golden Globe Awards (winning for Cinematic and Box Office Achievement and Best Original Score), and a leading seventeen nominations at the 31st Critics' Choice Awards (winning four awards). It received a record twenty-one nominations at the 26th Annual Black Reel Awards, and won fourteen awards, breaking the record set by Coogler's Black Panther for the most wins by a film. At the 32nd Actor Awards, it received five nominations, winning for Outstanding Performance by a Male Actor in a Leading Role and Outstanding Performance by a Cast in a Motion Picture. Additionally, Sinners was selected as one of the top ten films of the year by the National Board of Review and the American Film Institute.

On January 22, 2026, Sinners was nominated for sixteen awards at the 98th Academy Awards, the most of any film in history, including four of the Big Five awards, only missing a nomination for Best Actress. It ended up winning four awards; Best Actor (for Michael B. Jordan), Best Original Screenplay (for Ryan Coogler), Best Cinematography (for Autumn Durald Arkapaw) and Best Original Score (for Ludwig Göransson). Arkapaw became the first female and black winner for Best Cinematography.

Sinners received thirteen nominations at the 79th British Academy Film Awards and won three awards at the ceremony (for Best Actress in a Supporting Role, Best Original Screenplay and Best Original Score) making it the film with the most nominations and wins for a film by a Black director in BAFTA history.

== Legacy ==
Richard Brody of The New Yorker placed Sinners at Number 1 on his list of the best films of 2025. In June 2025, IndieWire ranked the film at number 65 on its list of "The 100 Best Movies of the 2020s (So Far)". In July 2025, The Hollywood Reporter ranked it number 16 on its list of the "25 Best Horror Movies of the 21st Century".

=== Cultural influence ===
Sinners was referenced in the Abbott Elementary episode "Camping". In the episode, Gregory dresses up as Coogler and Janine dresses up as an IMAX screen for Halloween. The film was referenced by Kendrick Lamar in his guest verse on Baby Keem's single "Good Flirts", which also featured Momo Boyd of Infinity Song. In the episode "Welcome to Spades" from The Neighborhood, Calvin says Dave spoiled the movie before he saw it, saying "I didn't know vampires Riverdance". It was also one of several horror movies parodied in Scary Movie 6. AZ Chike and Tyler, the Creator reenacted a scene from Sinners, alongside other movies, in the music video of the former rapper's single "Look Like My Mama". Mississippi Senate-elect Scott Colom went viral in October 2026 for releasing an ad for his campaign in which he and his identical twin brother advertised his campaign while playing the Smokestack twins and depicting his opponent Cindy Hyde-Smith as a vampire.

On May 21, 2026, a haunted house based on the film was announced for that year's Halloween Horror Nights events at Universal Studios Florida and Universal Studios Hollywood.
