= List of accolades received by Sinners (2025 film) =

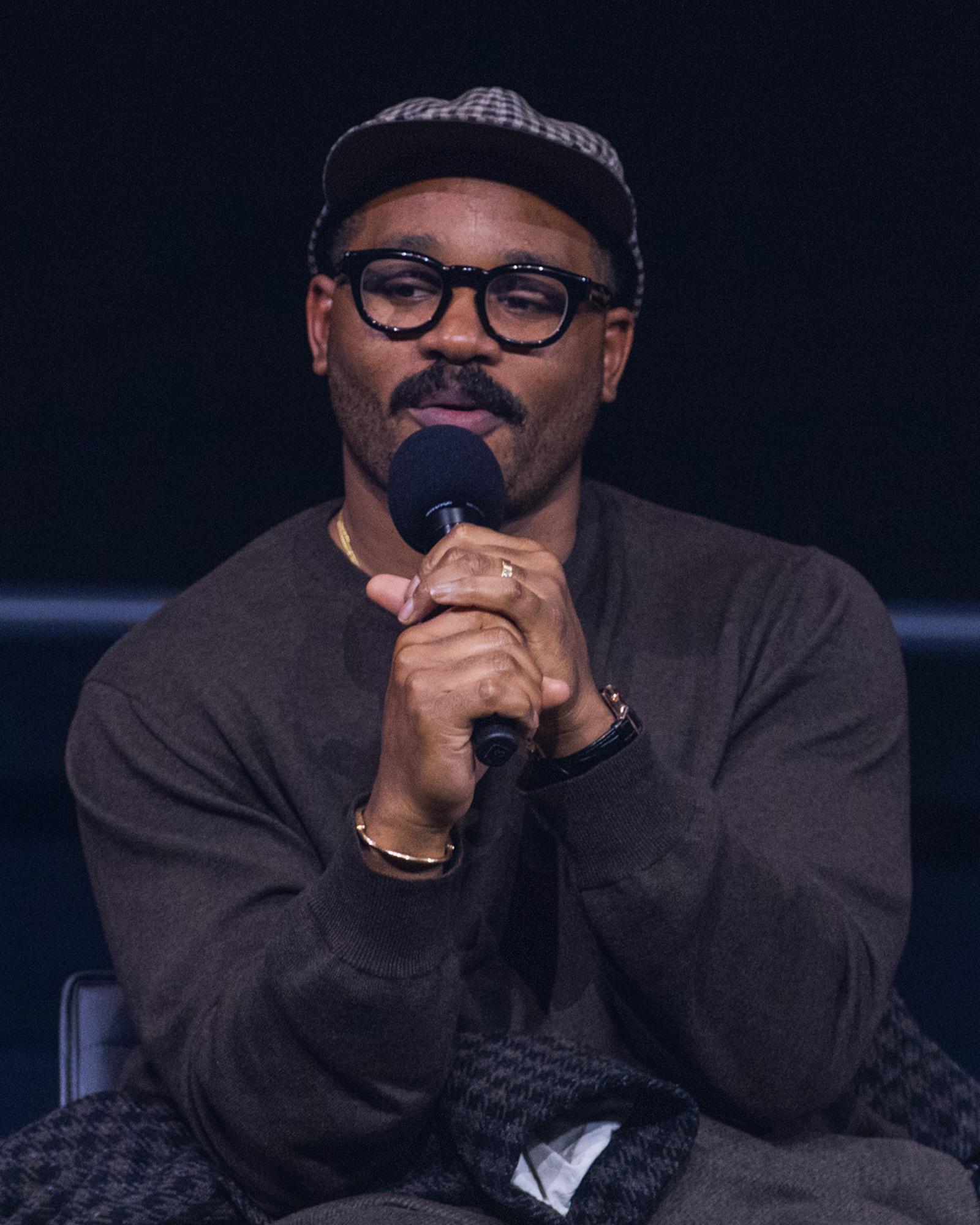
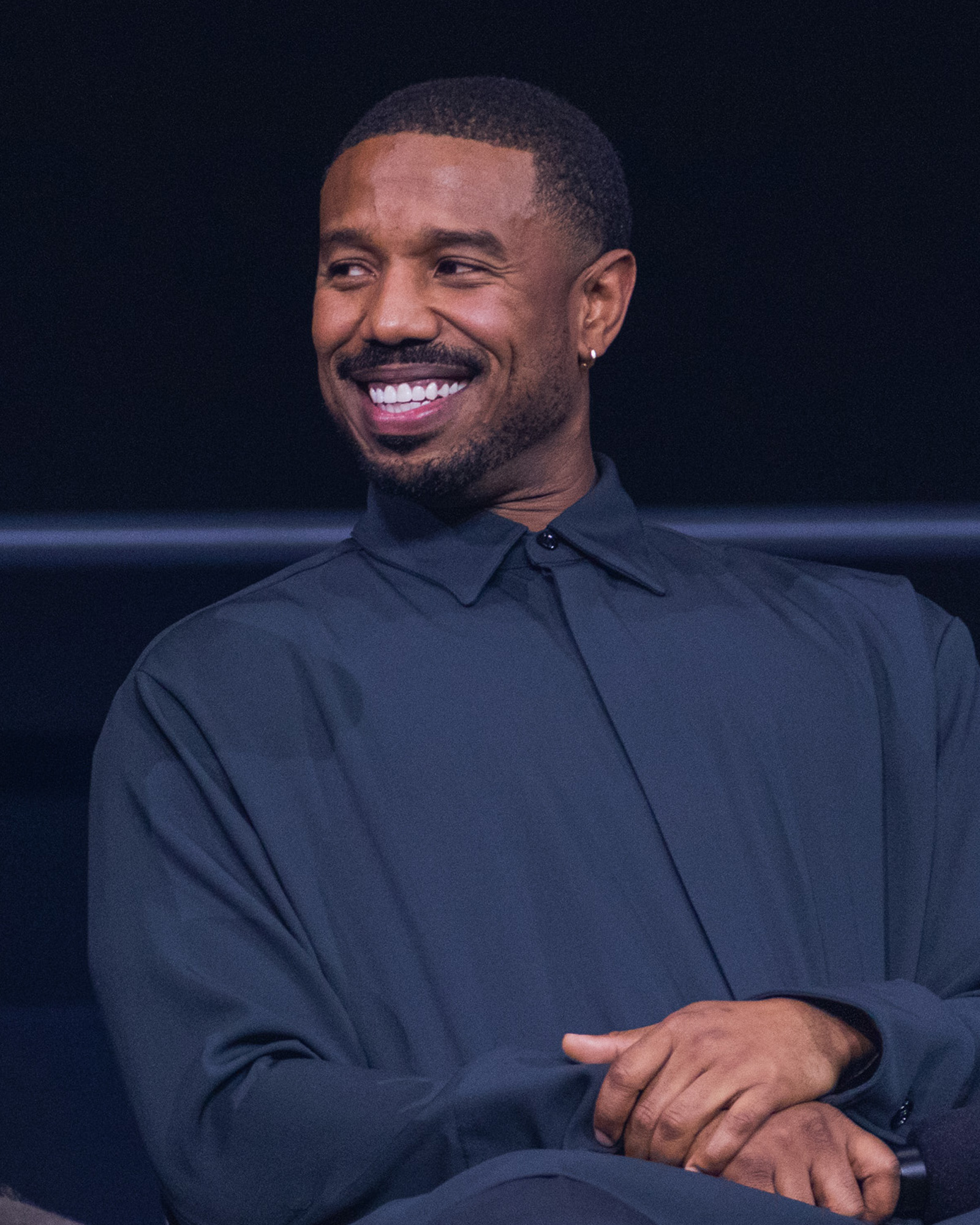
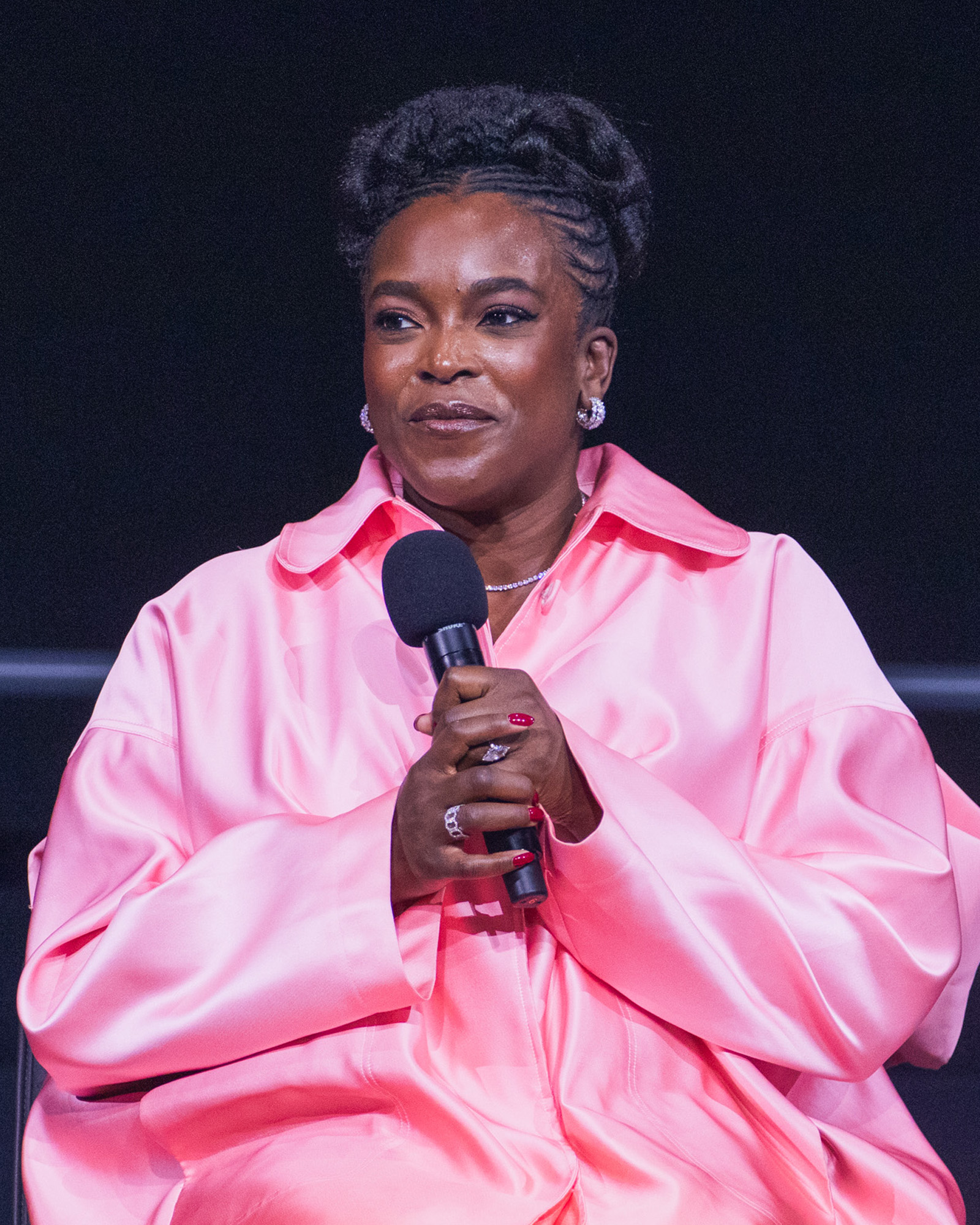
- Ryan Coogler (left) received numerous accolades for his screenplay and direction, and Michael B. Jordan (center) and Wunmi Mosaku (right) for their performances.
Accolades
Award	Wins	Nominations
AACTA International Awards	0	2
AARP Movies for Grownups Awards	1	3
Academy Awards	4	16
Actor Awards	2	5
Alliance of Women Film Journalists	7	9
American Film Institute Awards	1	1
American Society of Cinematographers Awards	0	1
Art Directors Guild Awards	0	1
Astra Film and Creative Arts Awards	9	20
Astra Midseason Movie Awards	7	7
Austin Film Critics Association	3	11
Black Reel Awards	14	21
Boston Online Film Critics Association	3	3
Boston Society of Film Critics	4	4
British Academy Film Awards	3	13
British Society of Film Critics	4	4
British Society of Cinematographers Awards	0	1
Camerimage	0	1
Casting Society of America	1	1
Celebration of Cinema and Television	1	1
Chicago Film Critics Association	1	12
Cinema Audio Society Awards	0	1
Costume Designers Guild Awards	0	1
Critics Choice Awards	4	17
Critics' Choice Super Awards	2	4
Dallas–Fort Worth Film Critics Association	7	7
Directors Guild of America Awards	0	1
Dublin Film Critics' Circle	5	5
Fangoria Chainsaw Awards	4	10
Florida Film Critics Circle	4	12
Georgia Film Critics Association	10	11
Golden Globe Awards	2	7
Golden Tomato Awards	3	3
Golden Trailer Awards	4	4
Gotham Independent Film Awards	2	2
Grammy Awards	2	6
Guild of Music Supervisors Awards	2	3
Hollywood Music in Media Awards	3	5
Hugo Awards	1	1
IndieWire Honors	1	1
Kansas City Film Critics Circle	3	9
Location Managers Guild Awards	0	1
London Film Critics' Circle	1	7
Los Angeles Film Critics Association	4	4
Make-Up Artists & Hair Stylists Guild	2	3
National Board of Review	3	3
National Society of Film Critics	5	5
Newport Beach Film Festival	2	2
New York Film Critics Circle	1	1
New York Film Critics Online	6	10
Online Film Critics Society	10	16
Online Film & Television Association	11	25
Palm Springs International Film Festival	1	1
Phoenix Film Critics Society	7	7
Producers Guild of America Awards	0	1
San Diego Film Critics Society	8	12
San Francisco Film Critics	7	9
Santa Barbara International Film Festival	1	1
Satellite Awards	2	14
Saturn Awards	2	12
Seattle Film Critics Society	2	14
Society of Composers & Lyricists	2	3
Southeastern Film Critics Association	7	7
St. Louis Film Critics Association	6	14
Toronto Film Critics Association	5	5
Visual Effects Society Awards	1	1
Washington D.C. Area Film Critics Association	10	13
Writers Guild of America Awards	1	1

Totals (Note: Certain award groups do not simply award one winner. They acknowledge several different recipients, have runners-up, and have third place. Since this is a specific recognition and is different from losing an award, runner-up mentions are considered wins in this award tally. For simplification and to avoid errors, each award in this list has been presumed to have had a prior nomination.)
- Wins: 233
- Nominations: 444

Sinners is a 2025 American horror film (Note: Described as a genre-defying film, Sinners incorporates a hybrid of Southern Gothic, period drama, supernatural horror, and musical elements.) produced, written, and directed by Ryan Coogler. Set in 1932 in the Mississippi Delta, the film stars Michael B. Jordan in dual roles as criminal twin brothers who return to their hometown, where they are confronted by a supernatural evil. It co-stars Hailee Steinfeld, Miles Caton (in his film debut), Jack O'Connell, Wunmi Mosaku, Jayme Lawson, Omar Miller, and Delroy Lindo. The film premiered on April 3, 2025, at AMC Lincoln Square in New York City, and was theatrically released in the United States on April 18, 2025, by Warner Bros. Pictures.

Sinners received critical acclaim and grossed $368 million worldwide against a budget of $90-100 million. It was nominated for sixteen Academy Awards, the most of any film in history, including the Academy Award for Best Director and the Academy Award for Best Picture. Both the National Board of Review and the American Film Institute listed it among the top ten films of 2025, and it received several accolades, including four wins at the 31st Critics' Choice Awards and two wins at the 83rd Golden Globe Awards. Receiving thirteen nominations at the 79th British Academy Film Awards, it has the most nominations for a film by a Black director in BAFTA history.

== Accolades ==
Award	Date of ceremony	Category	Recipient(s)	Result	Ref.
AACTA International Awards	February 6, 2026	Best Film	Sinners	Nominated	
AACTA International Awards	February 6, 2026	Best Director	Ryan Coogler	Nominated	
Academy Awards	March 15, 2026	Best Picture	Zinzi Coogler, Sev Ohanian, and Ryan Coogler	Nominated	
Academy Awards	March 15, 2026	Best Director	Ryan Coogler	Nominated	
Academy Awards	March 15, 2026	Best Actor	Michael B. Jordan	Won	
Academy Awards	March 15, 2026	Best Supporting Actor	Delroy Lindo	Nominated	
Academy Awards	March 15, 2026	Best Supporting Actress	Wunmi Mosaku	Nominated	
Academy Awards	March 15, 2026	Best Original Screenplay	Ryan Coogler	Won	
Academy Awards	March 15, 2026	Best Casting	Francine Maisler	Nominated	
Academy Awards	March 15, 2026	Best Cinematography	Autumn Durald Arkapaw	Won	
Academy Awards	March 15, 2026	Best Film Editing	Michael P. Shawver	Nominated	
Academy Awards	March 15, 2026	Best Costume Design	Ruth E. Carter	Nominated	
Academy Awards	March 15, 2026	Best Makeup and Hairstyling	Ken Diaz, Mike Fontaine, and Shunika Terry	Nominated	
Academy Awards	March 15, 2026	Best Original Score	Ludwig Göransson	Won	
Academy Awards	March 15, 2026	Best Original Song	Raphael Saadiq and Ludwig Göransson (for "I Lied to You")	Nominated	
Academy Awards	March 15, 2026	Best Production Design	Hannah Beachler and Monique Champagne	Nominated	
Academy Awards	March 15, 2026	Best Sound	Chris Welcker, Benjamin A. Burtt, Felipe Pacheco, Brandon Proctor, and Steve Boeddeker	Nominated	
Academy Awards	March 15, 2026	Best Visual Effects	Michael Ralla, Espen Nordahl, Guido Wolter, and Donnie Dean	Nominated	
Actor Awards	March 1, 2026	Outstanding Performance by a Cast in a Motion Picture	Miles Caton, Buddy Guy, Michael B. Jordan, Jayme Lawson, Delroy Lindo, Omar Miller, Wunmi Mosaku, Jack O'Connell, and Hailee Steinfeld	Won	
Actor Awards	March 1, 2026	Outstanding Performance by a Male Actor in a Leading Role	Michael B. Jordan	Won	
Actor Awards	March 1, 2026	Outstanding Performance by a Male Actor in a Supporting Role	Miles Caton	Nominated	
Actor Awards	March 1, 2026	Outstanding Performance by a Female Actor in a Supporting Role	Wunmi Mosaku	Nominated	
Actor Awards	March 1, 2026	Outstanding Performance by a Stunt Ensemble in a Motion Picture	Various (Note: Jasen Ament, Walker Babington, Ted Barba, Kenny Bartram, Hunter Baxley, Percey Bell, Tim Bell, Tobiah Ben, Silas Borelly, Sean Braud, Jeff Brockton, Scheryl Brown, Chris Bryant, Kevin Cheatham, Matt Cipro, Theo Crane, Nicole Day, Jamal Dennis, Joe Dryden, Charles Edwards, Philip Fornah, Khayana Frazier, Andy Gill, Barry Hanley, Angela Hollis, Adam Horowitz, Jacob Kabel, Jade Kindar-Martin, Augie Lodholz, Marco Patrick, Mark Patrick, John Luke Pichon, Stephon Rodgers, Mike Seal, Joseph Singletary, Tim Smith, Jaden Spade, Angel Spitale, Eric Stratemeier, Dother Sykes IV, Devante Thomas, Emily Tung, Stanley White, Leigh Wright, Mike Yahn, and Erin Young.)	Nominated	
AARP Movies for Grownups Awards	January 10, 2026	Best Picture	Sinners	Nominated	
AARP Movies for Grownups Awards	January 10, 2026	Best Supporting Actor	Delroy Lindo	Won	
AARP Movies for Grownups Awards	January 10, 2026	Best Period Film	Sinners	Nominated	
Alliance of Women Film Journalists	December 31, 2025	Best Film	Sinners	Won	
Alliance of Women Film Journalists	December 31, 2025	Best Director	Ryan Coogler	Won	
Alliance of Women Film Journalists	December 31, 2025	Best Screenplay, Original	Ryan Coogler	Won	
Alliance of Women Film Journalists	December 31, 2025	Best Actress, Supporting	Wunmi Mosaku	Won	
Alliance of Women Film Journalists	December 31, 2025	Best Actor	Michael B. Jordan	Won	
Alliance of Women Film Journalists	December 31, 2025	Best Ensemble Cast and Casting Director	Francine Maisler	Won	
Alliance of Women Film Journalists	December 31, 2025	Best Cinematography	Autumn Durald Arkapaw	Won	
Alliance of Women Film Journalists	December 31, 2025	Best Editing	Michael P. Shawver	Nominated	
Alliance of Women Film Journalists	December 31, 2025	Best Breakthrough Performance	Wunmi Mosaku	Nominated	
American Cinema Editors Awards	February 27, 2026	Best Edited Feature Film (Drama, Theatrical)	Michael Shawver	Won	
American Film Institute Awards	December 4, 2025	Top 10 Films	Sinners	Won (Note: Also awarded to nine other films.)	
American Society of Cinematographers Awards	March 8, 2026	Theatrical Feature Film	Autumn Durald Arkapaw	Nominated	
Art Directors Guild Awards	February 28, 2026	Best Period Feature Film	Hannah Beachler	Nominated	
Astra Film Awards	January 9, 2026	Best Picture – Drama	Sinners	Won	
Astra Film Awards	January 9, 2026	Best Director	Ryan Coogler	Won	
Astra Film Awards	January 9, 2026	Best Actor – Drama	Michael B. Jordan	Won	
Astra Film Awards	January 9, 2026	Best Supporting Actor – Drama	Miles Caton	Nominated	
Astra Film Awards	January 9, 2026	Best Supporting Actor – Drama	Delroy Lindo	Nominated	
Astra Film Awards	January 9, 2026	Best Supporting Actress – Drama	Wunmi Mosaku	Nominated	
Astra Film Awards	January 9, 2026	Best Supporting Actress – Drama	Hailee Steinfeld	Nominated	
Astra Film Awards	January 9, 2026	Best Original Screenplay	Ryan Coogler	Won	
Astra Film Awards	January 9, 2026	Best Cast Ensemble	Sinners	Won	
Astra Film Awards	January 9, 2026	Best Original Song	"I Lied to You"	Nominated	
Astra Film Awards	January 9, 2026	Best Score	Ludwig Göransson	Won	
Astra Film Awards	December 11, 2025	Best Casting	Francine Maisler	Won	
Astra Film Awards	December 11, 2025	Best Cinematography	Autumn Durald Arkapaw	Won	
Astra Film Awards	December 11, 2025	Best Costume Design	Ruth E. Carter	Nominated	
Astra Film Awards	December 11, 2025	Best Film Editing	Michael P. Shawver	Nominated	
Astra Film Awards	December 11, 2025	Best Makeup and Hairstyling	Siân Richards, Ken Diaz, Mike Fontaine, and Shunika Terry	Nominated	
Astra Film Awards	December 11, 2025	Best Marketing Campaign	Sinners	Nominated	
Astra Film Awards	December 11, 2025	Best Production Design	Hannah Beachler and Monique Champagne	Nominated	
Astra Film Awards	December 11, 2025	Best Sound	Chris Welcker, Benjamin A. Burtt, Brandon Proctor, Steve Boeddeker, Felipe Pacheco, and David V. Butler	Won	
Astra Film Awards	December 11, 2025	Best Stunt Coordinator	Andy Gill	Nominated	
Astra Midseason Movie Awards	July 3, 2025	Best Picture	Sinners	Won	
Astra Midseason Movie Awards	July 3, 2025	Best Director	Ryan Coogler	Won	
Astra Midseason Movie Awards	July 3, 2025	Best Actor	Michael B. Jordan	Won	
Astra Midseason Movie Awards	July 3, 2025	Best Supporting Actor	Miles Caton	Won	
Astra Midseason Movie Awards	July 3, 2025	Best Supporting Actress	Wunmi Mosaku	Runner-up	
Astra Midseason Movie Awards	July 3, 2025	Best Supporting Actress	Hailee Steinfeld	Won	
Astra Midseason Movie Awards	July 3, 2025	Best Screenplay	Sinners	Won	
Austin Film Critics Association	December 18, 2025	Best Picture	Sinners	Nominated	
Austin Film Critics Association	December 18, 2025	Best Director	Ryan Coogler	Nominated	
Austin Film Critics Association	December 18, 2025	Best Lead Actor	Michael B. Jordan	Nominated	
Austin Film Critics Association	December 18, 2025	Best Supporting Actress	Wunmi Mosaku	Nominated	
Austin Film Critics Association	December 18, 2025	Best Original Screenplay	Ryan Coogler	Nominated	
Austin Film Critics Association	December 18, 2025	Best Cinematography	Autumn Durald Arkapaw	Won	
Austin Film Critics Association	December 18, 2025	Best Editing	Michael P. Shawver	Nominated	
Austin Film Critics Association	December 18, 2025	Best Original Score	Ludwig Göransson	Won	
Austin Film Critics Association	December 18, 2025	Best Ensemble	Sinners	Won	
Austin Film Critics Association	December 18, 2025	Best Stunt Work	Sinners	Nominated	
Austin Film Critics Association	December 18, 2025	Best Visual Effects	Sinners	Nominated	
Black Reel Awards	February 16, 2026	Outstanding Film	Sinners	Won	
Black Reel Awards	February 16, 2026	Outstanding Director	Ryan Coogler	Won	
Black Reel Awards	February 16, 2026	Outstanding Lead Performance	Michael B. Jordan	Won	
Black Reel Awards	February 16, 2026	Outstanding Supporting Performance	Delroy Lindo	Nominated	
Black Reel Awards	February 16, 2026	Outstanding Supporting Performance	Wunmi Mosaku	Won	
Black Reel Awards	February 16, 2026	Outstanding Supporting Performance	Miles Caton	Nominated	
Black Reel Awards	February 16, 2026	Outstanding Breakthrough Performance	Miles Caton	Won	
Black Reel Awards	February 16, 2026	Outstanding Breakthrough Performance	Jayme Lawson	Nominated	
Black Reel Awards	February 16, 2026	Outstanding Ensemble	Francine Maisler	Won	
Black Reel Awards	February 16, 2026	Outstanding Screenplay	Ryan Coogler	Won	
Black Reel Awards	February 16, 2026	Outstanding Original Score	Ludwig Göransson	Won	
Black Reel Awards	February 16, 2026	Outstanding Original Soundtrack	Sinners	Won	
Black Reel Awards	February 16, 2026	Outstanding Original Song	Raphael Saadiq and Ludwig Göransson (for "I Lied to You")	Won	
Black Reel Awards	February 16, 2026	Outstanding Original Song	Miles Caton, Alice Smith and Ludwig Göransson (for "Last Time (I Seen the Sun)")	Nominated	
Black Reel Awards	February 16, 2026	Outstanding Original Song	Brittany Howard and Ludwig Göransson (for "Pale, Pale Moon")	Nominated	
Black Reel Awards	February 16, 2026	Outstanding Original Song	Darius Povillunas, Kyris D'Asia, Rod Wave and Tarkan Kozluklu (for "Sinners")	Nominated	
Black Reel Awards	February 16, 2026	Outstanding Cinematography	Autumn Durald Arkapaw	Won	
Black Reel Awards	February 16, 2026	Outstanding Editing	Michael Shawver	Won	
Black Reel Awards	February 16, 2026	Outstanding Costume Design	Ruth E. Carter	Nominated	
Black Reel Awards	February 16, 2026	Outstanding Production Design	Hannah Beachler and Monique Champagne	Won	
Black Reel Awards	February 16, 2026	Outstanding Hairstyling & Makeup	Ken Diaz, Mike Fontaine, Sian Richards, and Shunika Terry	Won	
Boston Online Film Critics Association	December 20, 2025	Best Picture	Sinners	Runner-up	
Boston Online Film Critics Association	December 20, 2025	Best Ensemble	Sinners	Won	
Boston Online Film Critics Association	December 20, 2025	Best Score	Ludwig Göransson	Won	
Boston Society of Film Critics	December 14, 2025	Best Picture	Sinners	Won	
Boston Society of Film Critics	December 14, 2025	Best Director	Ryan Coogler	Won	
Boston Society of Film Critics	December 14, 2025	Best Cinematography	Autumn Durald Arkapaw	Won	
Boston Society of Film Critics	December 14, 2025	Best Score	Ludwig Göransson	Won	
Bram Stoker Awards	June 4, 2026	Screenplay	Ryan Coogler	Won	
British Academy Film Awards	February 22, 2026	Best Film	Sinners	Nominated	
British Academy Film Awards	February 22, 2026	Best Director	Ryan Coogler	Nominated	
British Academy Film Awards	February 22, 2026	Best Actor in a Leading Role	Michael B. Jordan	Nominated	
British Academy Film Awards	February 22, 2026	Best Actress in a Supporting Role	Wunmi Mosaku	Won	
British Academy Film Awards	February 22, 2026	Best Original Screenplay	Ryan Coogler	Won	
British Academy Film Awards	February 22, 2026	Best Cinematography	Autumn Durald Arkapaw	Nominated	
British Academy Film Awards	February 22, 2026	Best Production Design	Hannah Beachler and Monique Champagne	Nominated	
British Academy Film Awards	February 22, 2026	Best Costume Design	Ruth E. Carter	Nominated	
British Academy Film Awards	February 22, 2026	Best Makeup and Hair	Siân Richards, Shunika Terry, Ken Diaz, and Mike Fontaine	Nominated	
British Academy Film Awards	February 22, 2026	Best Editing	Michael P. Shawver	Nominated	
British Academy Film Awards	February 22, 2026	Best Original Score	Ludwig Göransson	Won	
British Academy Film Awards	February 22, 2026	Best Sound	Chris Welcker, Benny Burtt, Brandon Proctor, Steve Boeddeker, and Felipe Pacheco	Nominated	
British Academy Film Awards	February 22, 2026	EE Rising Star Award	Miles Caton	Nominated	
British Society of Cinematographers Awards	February 7, 2026	Best Cinematography in a Theatrical Feature Film	Autumn Durald Arkapaw	Nominated	
Camerimage	November 22, 2025	Golden Frog	Autumn Durald Arkapaw	Nominated	
Casting Society of America	February 26, 2026	Feature Big Budget – Drama	Francine Maisler; Molly Rose and Amber Wakefield (Associate Casting Directors); Meagan Lewis (Location Casting Director)	Won	
Celebration of Cinema and Television	December 9, 2025	Director Award	Ryan Coogler	Won	
Chicago Film Critics Association	December 11, 2025	Best Picture	Sinners	Nominated	
Chicago Film Critics Association	December 11, 2025	Best Director	Ryan Coogler	Nominated	
Chicago Film Critics Association	December 11, 2025	Best Actor	Michael B. Jordan	Nominated	
Chicago Film Critics Association	December 11, 2025	Best Supporting Actor	Delroy Lindo	Nominated	
Chicago Film Critics Association	December 11, 2025	Best Supporting Actress	Wunmi Mosaku	Nominated	
Chicago Film Critics Association	December 11, 2025	Best Original Screenplay	Ryan Coogler	Nominated	
Chicago Film Critics Association	December 11, 2025	Best Cinematography	Autumn Durald Arkapaw	Nominated	
Chicago Film Critics Association	December 11, 2025	Best Art Direction/Production Design	Hannah Beachler and Monique Champagne	Nominated	
Chicago Film Critics Association	December 11, 2025	Best Costume Design	Ruth E. Carter	Nominated	
Chicago Film Critics Association	December 11, 2025	Best Original Score	Ludwig Göransson	Nominated	
Chicago Film Critics Association	December 11, 2025	Best Use of Visual Effects	Michael Ralla, Espen Nordahl, Guido Wolter, and Donnie Dean	Won	
Chicago Film Critics Association	December 11, 2025	Most Promising Performer	Miles Caton	Nominated	
Cinema Audio Society Awards	March 7, 2026	Outstanding Achievement in Sound Mixing for a Motion Picture – Live Action	Sinners	Nominated	
Costume Designers Guild Awards	February 12, 2026	Excellence in Period Film	Ruth E. Carter	Nominated	
Critics' Choice Movie Awards	January 4, 2026	Best Picture	Sinners	Nominated	
Critics' Choice Movie Awards	January 4, 2026	Best Director	Ryan Coogler	Nominated	
Critics' Choice Movie Awards	January 4, 2026	Best Actor	Michael B. Jordan	Nominated	
Critics' Choice Movie Awards	January 4, 2026	Best Supporting Actress	Wunmi Mosaku	Nominated	
Critics' Choice Movie Awards	January 4, 2026	Best Young Performer	Miles Caton	Won	
Critics' Choice Movie Awards	January 4, 2026	Best Casting and Ensemble	Francine Maisler	Won	
Critics' Choice Movie Awards	January 4, 2026	Best Original Screenplay	Ryan Coogler	Won	
Critics' Choice Movie Awards	January 4, 2026	Best Cinematography	Autumn Durald Arkapaw	Nominated	
Critics' Choice Movie Awards	January 4, 2026	Best Editing	Michael P. Shawver	Nominated	
Critics' Choice Movie Awards	January 4, 2026	Best Costume Design	Ruth E. Carter	Nominated	
Critics' Choice Movie Awards	January 4, 2026	Best Production Design	Hannah Beachler and Monique Champagne	Nominated	
Critics' Choice Movie Awards	January 4, 2026	Best Score	Ludwig Göransson	Won	
Critics' Choice Movie Awards	January 4, 2026	Best Song	Raphael Saadiq and Ludwig Göransson (for "I Lied to You")	Nominated	
Critics' Choice Movie Awards	January 4, 2026	Best Hair and Make-Up	Siân Richards, Ken Diaz, Mike Fontaine, and Shunika Terry	Nominated	
Critics' Choice Movie Awards	January 4, 2026	Best Visual Effects	Michael Ralla, Espen Nordahl, Guido Wolter, and Donnie Dean	Nominated	
Critics' Choice Movie Awards	January 4, 2026	Best Stunt Design	Andy Gill	Nominated	
Critics' Choice Movie Awards	January 4, 2026	Best Sound	Chris Welcker, Benny Burtt, Brandon Proctor, Steve Boeddeker, Felipe Pacheco, and David V. Butler	Nominated	
Critics' Choice Super Awards	August 7, 2025	Best Horror Movie	Sinners	Won	
Critics' Choice Super Awards	August 7, 2025	Best Actor in a Horror Movie	Michael B. Jordan	Won	
Critics' Choice Super Awards	August 7, 2025	Best Actress in a Horror Movie	Wunmi Mosaku	Nominated	
Critics' Choice Super Awards	August 7, 2025	Best Villain in a Movie	Jack O'Connell	Nominated	
Dallas–Fort Worth Film Critics Association	December 17, 2025	Best Picture	Sinners	Runner-up	
Dallas–Fort Worth Film Critics Association	December 17, 2025	Best Director	Ryan Coogler	Runner-up	
Dallas–Fort Worth Film Critics Association	December 17, 2025	Best Actor	Michael B. Jordan	3rd Place	
Dallas–Fort Worth Film Critics Association	December 17, 2025	Best Supporting Actress	Wunmi Mosaku	5th Place	
Dallas–Fort Worth Film Critics Association	December 17, 2025	Best Screenplay	Ryan Coogler	Runner-up	
Dallas–Fort Worth Film Critics Association	December 17, 2025	Best Cinematography	Autumn Durald Arkapaw	Won	
Dallas–Fort Worth Film Critics Association	December 17, 2025	Best Musical Score	Ludwig Göransson	Won	
Directors Guild of America Awards	February 7, 2026	Outstanding Directing – Feature Film	Ryan Coogler	Nominated	
Dublin Film Critics' Circle	December 18, 2025	Best Film	Sinners	Won	
Dublin Film Critics' Circle	December 18, 2025	Best Director	Ryan Coogler	Won	
Dublin Film Critics' Circle	December 18, 2025	Best Actor	Michael B. Jordan	Won	
Dublin Film Critics' Circle	December 18, 2025	Best Screenplay	Ryan Coogler	Won	
Dublin Film Critics' Circle	December 18, 2025	Best Cinematography	Autumn Durald Arkapaw	Won	
Fangoria Chainsaw Awards	October 19, 2025	Best Wide Release	Sinners	Won	
Fangoria Chainsaw Awards	October 19, 2025	Best Director	Ryan Coogler	Won	
Fangoria Chainsaw Awards	October 19, 2025	Best Lead Performance	Michael B. Jordan	Nominated	
Fangoria Chainsaw Awards	October 19, 2025	Best Supporting Performance	Miles Caton	Nominated	
Fangoria Chainsaw Awards	October 19, 2025	Best Supporting Performance	Wunmi Mosaku	Nominated	
Fangoria Chainsaw Awards	October 19, 2025	Best Supporting Performance	Jack O'Connell	Nominated	
Fangoria Chainsaw Awards	October 19, 2025	Best Screenplay	Ryan Coogler	Won	
Fangoria Chainsaw Awards	October 19, 2025	Best Cinematography	Autumn Durald Arkapaw	Nominated	
Fangoria Chainsaw Awards	October 19, 2025	Best Score	Ludwig Göransson	Won	
Fangoria Chainsaw Awards	October 19, 2025	Best Costume Design	Ruth E. Carter	Nominated	
Florida Film Critics Circle	December 19, 2025	Best Picture	Sinners	Nominated	
Florida Film Critics Circle	December 19, 2025	Best Director	Ryan Coogler	Nominated	
Florida Film Critics Circle	December 19, 2025	Best Supporting Actor	Delroy Lindo	Nominated	
Florida Film Critics Circle	December 19, 2025	Best Supporting Actress	Wunmi Mosaku	Runner-up	
Florida Film Critics Circle	December 19, 2025	Best Original Screenplay	Ryan Coogler	Nominated	
Florida Film Critics Circle	December 19, 2025	Best Cinematography	Autumn Durald Arkapaw	Runner-up	
Florida Film Critics Circle	December 19, 2025	Best Production Design and Art Direction	Hannah Bleachler & Monique Champagne	Nominated	
Florida Film Critics Circle	December 19, 2025	Best Visual Effects	Sinners	Nominated	
Florida Film Critics Circle	December 19, 2025	Best Editing	Michael P. Shawver	Nominated	
Florida Film Critics Circle	December 19, 2025	Best Original Score	Ludwig Göransson	Won	
Florida Film Critics Circle	December 19, 2025	Best Ensemble	Sinners	Runner-up	
Florida Film Critics Circle	December 19, 2025	Breakout Award	Miles Caton	Nominated	
Georgia Film Critics Association	December 27, 2025	Best Picture	Sinners	Runner-up	
Georgia Film Critics Association	December 27, 2025	Best Director	Ryan Coogler	Runner-up	
Georgia Film Critics Association	December 27, 2025	Best Actor	Michael B. Jordan	Runner-up	
Georgia Film Critics Association	December 27, 2025	Best Original Screenplay	Ryan Coogler	Won	
Georgia Film Critics Association	December 27, 2025	Best Cinematography	Autumn Durald Arkapaw	Won	
Georgia Film Critics Association	December 27, 2025	Best Production Design	Hannah Beachler, Monique Champagne	Runner-up	
Georgia Film Critics Association	December 27, 2025	Best Original Score	Ludwig Göransson	Won	
Georgia Film Critics Association	December 27, 2025	Best Original Song	"I Lied to You"	Won	
Georgia Film Critics Association	December 27, 2025	Best Original Song	"Last Time (I Seen the Sun)"	Nominated	
Georgia Film Critics Association	December 27, 2025	Best Ensemble	Sinners	Runner-up	
Georgia Film Critics Association	December 27, 2025	Breakthrough Award	Miles Caton	Won	
Golden Globe Awards	January 11, 2026	Best Motion Picture – Drama	Sinners	Nominated	
Golden Globe Awards	January 11, 2026	Best Actor in a Motion Picture – Drama	Michael B. Jordan	Nominated	
Golden Globe Awards	January 11, 2026	Best Director	Ryan Coogler	Nominated	
Golden Globe Awards	January 11, 2026	Best Screenplay	Ryan Coogler	Nominated	
Golden Globe Awards	January 11, 2026	Best Original Score	Ludwig Göransson	Won	
Golden Globe Awards	January 11, 2026	Cinematic and Box Office Achievement	Sinners	Won	
Golden Globe Awards	January 11, 2026	Best Original Song	Raphael Saadiq and Ludwig Göransson (for "I Lied to You")	Nominated	
Golden Reel Awards	March 8, 2026	Outstanding Achievement in Sound Editing – Feature Dialogue / ADR	Supervising Sound Editor: Benjamin A. Burtt, Supervising Dialogue/ADR Editor: David V. Butler MPSE, Dialogue/ADR Editor: Jason W. Freeman MPSE	Won	
Golden Reel Awards	March 8, 2026	Outstanding Achievement in Sound Editing – Feature Effects / Foley	Supervising Sound Editor: Benny Burtt, Supervising Foley Editor: Willard Overstreet MPSE, Sound Designer: Steve Boeddeker Sound Effects Editor: David C. Hughes, Foley Artists: Alyson Dee Moore, Katie Ros	Nominated	
Golden Reel Awards	March 8, 2026	Outstanding Achievement in Sound Editing – Feature Underscore	Music Editor: Felipe Pacheco	Won	
Golden Tomato Awards	January 13,2026	Best moive	Sinners	Won	
Golden Tomato Awards	January 13,2026	Best Horror Movies	Sinners	Won	
Golden Tomato Awards	January 13,2026	Fan Favorite Movies	Sinners	Won	
Golden Tomato Awards	January 13,2026	Golden year:filmmaker	Ryan Coogler	Honored	
Golden Trailer Awards	May 29, 2025	Best Horror	Warner Bros. Pictures, AV Squad (for "Magic")	Won	
Golden Trailer Awards	May 29, 2025	Best Music	Warner Bros. Pictures, AV Squad (for "Magic")	Nominated	
Golden Trailer Awards	May 29, 2025	Best Sound Editing	Warner Bros. Pictures, AV Squad (for "Seen")	Won	
Golden Trailer Awards	May 29, 2025	Best Thriller TV Spot	Warner Bros. Pictures, Create Advertising Group (for "Ready")	Won	
Golden Trailer Awards	May 29, 2025	Best Digital | Horror/Thriller	Warner Bros. Pictures, AV Squad (for "Happy New Year")	Nominated	
Golden Trailer Awards	May 29, 2025	Best Horror/Thriller TrailerByte (Feature Film)	Warner Bros. Pictures, AV Squad (for "Dark Mode")	Nominated	
Golden Trailer Awards	May 29, 2025	Best Horror Poster	Warner Bros. Pictures, AV Print	Nominated	
Golden Trailer Awards	May 29, 2025	Best International Poster	Warner Bros. Pictures, AV Print	Nominated	
Golden Trailer Awards	May 29, 2025	Most Original Poster	Warner Bros. Pictures, AV Print	Won	
Gotham Independent Film Awards	December 1, 2025	Outstanding Supporting Performance	Wunmi Mosaku	Won	
Gotham Independent Film Awards	December 1, 2025	Ensemble Tribute	Michael B. Jordan, Hailee Steinfeld, Miles Caton, Jack O'Connell, Wunmi Mosaku, Jayme Lawson, Omar Benson Miller, Buddy Guy, Li Jun Li, and Delroy Lindo	Won	
Grammy Awards	February 1, 2026	Best Compilation Soundtrack for Visual Media	Various artists (for Sinners)	Won	
Grammy Awards	February 1, 2026	Best Score Soundtrack Album for Visual Media	Ludwig Göransson	Won	
Grammy Awards	February 1, 2026	Best Song Written for Visual Media	Raphael Saadiq and Ludwig Göransson (for "I Lied to You")	Nominated	
Grammy Awards	February 1, 2026	Best Song Written for Visual Media	Ludwig Göransson and Brittany Howard (for "Pale, Pale Moon")	Nominated	
Grammy Awards	February 1, 2026	Best Song Written for Visual Media	Leonard Denisenko, Rodarius Green, Travis Harrington, Tarkan Kozluklu, Kyris Mingo, and Darius Povilinus (for "Sinners")	Nominated	
Grammy Awards	February 1, 2026	Best Instrumental Composition	Ludwig Göransson (for "Why You Here / Before The Sun Went Down")	Nominated	
Guild of Music Supervisors Awards	February 28, 2026	Best Music Supervision in Major Budget Films	Sinners	Won	
Guild of Music Supervisors Awards	February 28, 2026	Best Song Written and/or Recorded for a Film	"I Lied to You" Songwriters: Ludwig Göransson, Raphael Saadiq Performer: Miles Caton Music Supervisor: Niki Sherrod	Won	
Guild of Music Supervisors Awards	February 28, 2026	Best Song Written and/or Recorded for a Film	"Last Time (I Seen the Sun)" Songwriters: Miles Caton, Ludwig Göransson, Alice Smith Performers: Miles Caton, Ludwig Göransson, Alice Smith Music Supervisor: Niki Sherrod	Nominated	
Hollywood Music in Media Awards	November 19, 2025	Song – Feature Film	Alice Smith, Miles Caton, and Ludwig Göransson (for "Last Time (I Seen the Sun)")	Nominated	
Hollywood Music in Media Awards	November 19, 2025	Song – Feature Film	Raphael Saadiq, Ludwig Göransson, and Miles Caton (for "I Lied to You")	Won	
Hollywood Music in Media Awards	November 19, 2025	Song – Onscreen Performance (Film)	Miles Caton (for "I Lied to You")	Won	
Hollywood Music in Media Awards	November 19, 2025	Score – Feature Film	Ludwig Göransson	Won	
Hollywood Music in Media Awards	November 19, 2025	Soundtrack Album	Sony Masterworks Records	Nominated	
Hugo Awards	August 30, 2026	Dramatic Presentation, Long Form	Ryan Coogler	Won	
IndieWire Honors	December 4, 2025	Impact Award	Autumn Durald Arkapaw	Won	
Kansas City Film Critics Circle	December 21, 2025	Best Film	Sinners	Nominated	
Kansas City Film Critics Circle	December 21, 2025	Best Director	Ryan Coogler	Nominated	
Kansas City Film Critics Circle	December 21, 2025	Best Actor	Michael B. Jordan	Won	
Kansas City Film Critics Circle	December 21, 2025	Best Supporting Actor	Delroy Lindo	Nominated	
Kansas City Film Critics Circle	December 21, 2025	Best Supporting Actress	Wunmi Mosaku	Nominated	
Kansas City Film Critics Circle	December 21, 2025	Best Original Screenplay	Ryan Coogler	Nominated	
Kansas City Film Critics Circle	December 21, 2025	Best Cinematography	Autumn Durald Arkapaw	Nominated	
Kansas City Film Critics Circle	December 21, 2025	Best Original Score	Ludwig Göransson	Won	
Kansas City Film Critics Circle	December 21, 2025	Best Science Fiction/Fantasy/Horror	Sinners	Won	
Location Managers Guild Awards	August 13, 2025	Outstanding Locations in a Period Film	Sinners	Nominated	
London Film Critics' Circle	February 1, 2026	Film of the Year	Sinners	Nominated	
London Film Critics' Circle	February 1, 2026	Director of the Year	Ryan Coogler	Nominated	
London Film Critics' Circle	February 1, 2026	Supporting Actor of the Year	Delroy Lindo	Nominated	
London Film Critics' Circle	February 1, 2026	Supporting Actress of the Year	Wunmi Mosaku	Nominated	
London Film Critics' Circle	February 1, 2026	Screenwriter of the Year	Ryan Coogler	Nominated	
London Film Critics' Circle	February 1, 2026	Breakthrough Performer of the Year	Miles Caton	Nominated	
London Film Critics' Circle	February 1, 2026	Technical Achievement Award	Ludwig Göransson	Won	
Los Angeles Film Critics Association	December 7, 2025	Best Director	Ryan Coogler	Runner-up	
Los Angeles Film Critics Association	December 7, 2025	Best Production Design	Hannah Beachler	Won	
Los Angeles Film Critics Association	December 7, 2025	Best Music/Score	Ludwig Göransson	Runner-up	
Los Angeles Film Critics Association	December 7, 2025	Best Cinematography	Autumn Durald Arkapaw	Runner-up	
Make-Up Artists & Hair Stylists Guild Awards	February 14, 2026	Best Period and/or Character Make-Up	Ken Diaz, Siân Richards, Ned Neidhardt, Allison laCour, and Lana Mora	Won	
Make-Up Artists & Hair Stylists Guild Awards	February 14, 2026	Best Period Hair Styling and/or Character Hair Styling	Shunika Terry-Jennings, Elizabeth Robinson, Tene Wilder, Jove Edmond, and Sherri B. Hamilton	Won	
Make-Up Artists & Hair Stylists Guild Awards	February 14, 2026	Best Special Make-Up Effects	Mike Fontaine, Bailey Domke, Kelsey Berk, Kevin Wasner, and Cristina Patterson	Nominated	
National Board of Review	December 3, 2025	Top 10 Films	Sinners	Won	
National Board of Review	December 3, 2025	Best Original Screenplay	Ryan Coogler	Won	
National Board of Review	December 3, 2025	Outstanding Achievement in Cinematography	Autumn Durald Arkapaw	Won	
National Society of Film Critics	January 3, 2026	Best Picture	Sinners	Runner-up	
National Society of Film Critics	January 3, 2026	Best Actor	Michael B. Jordan	Runner-up	
National Society of Film Critics	January 3, 2026	Best Supporting Actor	Delroy Lindo	Runner-up	
National Society of Film Critics	January 3, 2026	Best Supporting Actress	Wunmi Mosaku	Runner-up	
National Society of Film Critics	January 3, 2026	Best Cinematography	Autumn Durald Arkapaw	Won	
New York Film Critics Circle	January 6, 2026	Best Cinematography	Autumn Durald Arkapaw	Won	
New York Film Critics Online	December 15, 2025	Best Picture	Sinners	Runner-up	
New York Film Critics Online	December 15, 2025	Best Director	Ryan Coogler	Won	
New York Film Critics Online	December 15, 2025	Best Actor	Michael B. Jordan	Nominated	
New York Film Critics Online	December 15, 2025	Best Supporting Actor	Delroy Lindo	Nominated	
New York Film Critics Online	December 15, 2025	Best Supporting Actress	Wunmi Mosaku	Nominated	
New York Film Critics Online	December 15, 2025	Best Ensemble Cast	Sinners	Won	
New York Film Critics Online	December 15, 2025	Best Screenplay	Ryan Coogler	Nominated	
New York Film Critics Online	December 15, 2025	Best Cinematography	Autumn Durald Arkapaw	Won	
New York Film Critics Online	December 15, 2025	Best Use of Music	Ludwig Göransson	Won	
New York Film Critics Online	December 15, 2025	Breakthrough performer	Miles Caton	Runner-up	
Newport Beach Film Festival	February 19, 2026	Spotlight Artist	Wunmi Mosaku	Won	
Newport Beach Film Festival	February 19, 2026	Artist of Distinction	Jack O'Connell	Won	
Online Film Critics Society	January 26, 2026	Best Picture	Sinners	Nominated	
Online Film Critics Society	January 26, 2026	Best Director	Ryan Coogler	Nominated	
Online Film Critics Society	January 26, 2026	Best Actor	Michael B. Jordan	Won	
Online Film Critics Society	January 26, 2026	Best Supporting Actor	Delroy Lindo	Nominated	
Online Film Critics Society	January 26, 2026	Best Supporting Actress	Wunmi Mosaku	Nominated	
Online Film Critics Society	January 26, 2026	Best Ensemble & Casting	Sinners	Nominated	
Online Film Critics Society	January 26, 2026	Best Original Screenplay	Ryan Coogler	Won	
Online Film Critics Society	January 26, 2026	Best Editing	Michael P. Shawver	Nominated	
Online Film Critics Society	January 26, 2026	Best Cinematography	Autumn Durald Arkapaw	Nominated	
Online Film Critics Society	January 26, 2026	Best Original Score	Ludwig Göransson	Won	
Online Film Critics Society	January 26, 2026	Best Production Design	Hannah Beachler and Monique Champagne	Won	
Online Film Critics Society	January 26, 2026	Best Costume Design	Ruth E. Carter	Won	
Online Film Critics Society	January 26, 2026	Best Makeup & Hairstyling	Sinners	Nominated	
Online Film Critics Society	January 26, 2026	Best Sound Design	Sinners	Won	
Online Film Critics Society	January 26, 2026	Best Visual Effects	Sinners	Won	
Online Film Critics Society	January 26, 2026	Best Choreography (Dance & Stunt)	Andy Gill	Won	
Online Film & Television Association	February 15, 2026	Best Picture	Sinners	Won	
Online Film & Television Association	February 15, 2026	Best Actor	Michael B. Jordan	Runner-up	
Online Film & Television Association	February 15, 2026	Best Supporting Actress	Wunmi Mosaku	Nominated	
Online Film & Television Association	February 15, 2026	Best Breakthrough Performance: Male	Miles Caton	Won	
Online Film & Television Association	February 15, 2026	Best Breakthrough Performance: Female	Wunmi Mosaku	Nominated	
Online Film & Television Association	February 15, 2026	Best Ensemble	Sinners	Won	
Online Film & Television Association	February 15, 2026	Best Casting	Francine Maisler	Won	
Online Film & Television Association	February 15, 2026	Best Director	Ryan Coogler	Runner-up	
Online Film & Television Association	February 15, 2026	Best Original Screenplay	Ryan Coogler	Won	
Online Film & Television Association	February 15, 2026	Best Original Score	Ludwig Göransson	Won	
Online Film & Television Association	February 15, 2026	Best Original Song	Raphael Saadiq and Ludwig Göransson (for "I Lied to You")	Won	
Online Film & Television Association	February 15, 2026	Best Adapted Song	"Rocky Road to Dublin"	Won	
Online Film & Television Association	February 15, 2026	Best Film Editing	Michael P. Shawver	Nominated	
Online Film & Television Association	February 15, 2026	Best Cinematography	Autumn Durald Arkapaw	Won	
Online Film & Television Association	February 15, 2026	Best Production Design	Hannah Beachler and Monique Champagne	Runner-up	
Online Film & Television Association	February 15, 2026	Best Costume Design	Ruth E. Carter	Nominated	
Online Film & Television Association	February 15, 2026	Best Makeup and Hairstyling	Sinners	Nominated	
Online Film & Television Association	February 15, 2026	Best Sound	Sinners	Runner-up	
Online Film & Television Association	February 15, 2026	Best Sound Effects	Sinners	Nominated	
Online Film & Television Association	February 15, 2026	Best Visual Effects	Sinners	Runner-up	
Online Film & Television Association	February 15, 2026	Best Stunt Coordination	Sinners	Nominated	
Online Film & Television Association	February 15, 2026	Best Titles Sequence	Sinners (Opening Credits)	Runner-up	
Online Film & Television Association	February 15, 2026	Most Cinematic Moment	"I Lied to You"	Won	
Online Film & Television Association	February 15, 2026	Best Movie Trailer	Sinners	Nominated	
Online Film & Television Association	February 15, 2026	Best Movie Poster	Sinners	Won	
Palm Springs International Film Festival	January 3, 2026	Icon Award	Michael B. Jordan	Won	
Phoenix Film Critics Society	December 15, 2025	Top Ten Films	Sinners	Won	
Phoenix Film Critics Society	December 15, 2025	Best Ensemble Acting	Sinners	Won	
Phoenix Film Critics Society	December 15, 2025	Best Original Screenplay	Ryan Coogler	Won	
Phoenix Film Critics Society	December 15, 2025	Best Original Song	"I Lied to You"	Won	
Phoenix Film Critics Society	December 15, 2025	Best Original Score	Ludwig Göransson	Won	
Phoenix Film Critics Society	December 15, 2025	Best Cinematography	Autumn Durald Arkapaw	Won	
Phoenix Film Critics Society	December 15, 2025	Best Costume Design	Ruth E. Carter	Won	
Producers Guild of America Awards	February 28, 2026	Darryl F. Zanuck Award for Outstanding Producer of Theatrical Motion Pictures	Ryan Coogler, Zinzi Coogler and Sev Ohanian	Nominated	
San Diego Film Critics Society	December 15, 2025	Best Picture	Sinners	Won	
San Diego Film Critics Society	December 15, 2025	Best Director	Ryan Coogler	Won	
San Diego Film Critics Society	December 15, 2025	Best Actor	Michael B. Jordan	Won	
San Diego Film Critics Society	December 15, 2025	Best Supporting Actress	Wunmi Mosaku	Nominated	
San Diego Film Critics Society	December 15, 2025	Best Original Screenplay	Ryan Coogler	Nominated	
San Diego Film Critics Society	December 15, 2025	Best Cinematography	Autumn Durald Arkapaw	Nominated	
San Diego Film Critics Society	December 15, 2025	Best Production Design	Hannah Bleachler & Monique Champagne	Runner-up	
San Diego Film Critics Society	December 15, 2025	Best Sound Design	Sinners	Nominated	
San Diego Film Critics Society	December 15, 2025	Best Costume Design	Ruth E. Carter	Runner-up	
San Diego Film Critics Society	December 15, 2025	Best Use of Music	Sinners	Won	
San Diego Film Critics Society	December 15, 2025	Best Stunt Choreography	Sinners	Runner-up	
San Diego Film Critics Society	December 15, 2025	Best Ensemble	Sinners	Runner-up	
San Francisco Film Critics	December 14, 2025	Best Picture	Sinners	Runner-up	
San Francisco Film Critics	December 14, 2025	Best Director	Ryan Coogler	Runner-up	
San Francisco Film Critics	December 14, 2025	Best Actor	Michael B. Jordan	Nominated	
San Francisco Film Critics	December 14, 2025	Best Supporting Actress	Wunmi Mosaku	Nominated	
San Francisco Film Critics	December 14, 2025	Best Original Screenplay	Ryan Coogler	Runner-up	
San Francisco Film Critics	December 14, 2025	Best Cinematography	Autumn Durald Arkapaw	Won	
San Francisco Film Critics	December 14, 2025	Best Production Design	Hannah Bleachler and Monique Champagne	Won	
San Francisco Film Critics	December 14, 2025	Best Film Editing	Michael P. Shawver	Runner-up	
San Francisco Film Critics	December 14, 2025	Best Original Score	Ludwig Göransson	Won	
Santa Barbara International Film Festival	February 12, 2026	Performer of the Year	Michael B. Jordan	Won	
Satellite Awards	March 28, 2026	Best Motion Picture – Drama	Sinners	Nominated	
Satellite Awards	March 28, 2026	Best Director	Ryan Coogler	Nominated	
Satellite Awards	March 28, 2026	Best Actor in a Motion Picture – Drama	Michael B. Jordan	Nominated	
Satellite Awards	March 28, 2026	Best Actress in a Supporting Role	Wunmi Mosaku	Nominated	
Satellite Awards	March 28, 2026	Best Original Screenplay	Ryan Coogler	Won	
Satellite Awards	March 28, 2026	Best Cinematography	Autumn Durald Arkapaw	Nominated	
Satellite Awards	March 28, 2026	Best Film Editing	Michael P. Shawver	Nominated	
Satellite Awards	March 28, 2026	Best Costume Design	Ruth E. Carter	Nominated	
Satellite Awards	March 28, 2026	Best Production Design	Hannah Beachler and Monique Champagne	Nominated	
Satellite Awards	March 28, 2026	Best Original Score	Ludwig Göransson	Won	
Satellite Awards	March 28, 2026	Best Original Song	"I Lied to You" – Ludwig Göransson and Raphael Saadiq	Nominated	
Satellite Awards	March 28, 2026	Best Makeup & Hair	Siân Richards, Ken Diaz, Mike Fontaine, and Shunika Terry	Nominated	
Satellite Awards	March 28, 2026	Best Sound (Editing and Mixing)	Chris Welcker, Benny Burtt, Brandon Proctor, Steve Boeddeker, Felipe Pacheco, and David V. Butler	Nominated	
Satellite Awards	March 28, 2026	Best Visual Effects	Michael Ralla, Espen Nordahl, Guido Wolter, and Donnie Dean	Nominated	
Saturn Awards	March 8, 2026	Best Thriller Film	Sinners	Won	
Saturn Awards	March 8, 2026	Best Film Direction	Ryan Coogler	Nominated	
Saturn Awards	March 8, 2026	Best Film Screenwriting	Ryan Coogler	Nominated	
Saturn Awards	March 8, 2026	Best Actor in a Film	Michael B. Jordan	Nominated	
Saturn Awards	March 8, 2026	Best Supporting Actor in a Film	Delroy Lindo	Nominated	
Saturn Awards	March 8, 2026	Best Supporting Actress in a Film	Hailee Steinfeld	Nominated	
Saturn Awards	March 8, 2026	Best Younger Performer in a Film	Miles Caton	Nominated	
Saturn Awards	March 8, 2026	Best Film Editing	Michael P. Shawyer	Won	
Saturn Awards	March 8, 2026	Best Film Music	Ludwig Göransson	Nominated	
Saturn Awards	March 8, 2026	Best Film Production Design	Hannah Bleachler and Monique Champagne	Nominated	
Saturn Awards	March 8, 2026	Best Film Costume Design	Ruth E. Carter	Nominated	
Saturn Awards	March 8, 2026	Best Film Make-Up	Mike Fontaine and Siân Richards	Nominated	
Seattle Film Critics Society	December 15, 2025	Best Picture	Sinners	Nominated	
Seattle Film Critics Society	December 15, 2025	Best Director	Ryan Coogler	Nominated	
Seattle Film Critics Society	December 15, 2025	Best Actor in a Leading Role	Michael B. Jordan	Nominated	
Seattle Film Critics Society	December 15, 2025	Best Actress in a Supporting Role	Wunmi Mosaku	Won	
Seattle Film Critics Society	December 15, 2025	Best Ensemble Cast	Francine Maisler	Nominated	
Seattle Film Critics Society	December 15, 2025	Best Youth Performance	Miles Caton	Nominated	
Seattle Film Critics Society	December 15, 2025	Best Screenplay	Ryan Coogler	Nominated	
Seattle Film Critics Society	December 15, 2025	Best Cinematography	Autumn Durald Arkapaw	Won	
Seattle Film Critics Society	December 15, 2025	Best Costume Design	Ruth E. Carter	Nominated	
Seattle Film Critics Society	December 15, 2025	Best Original Score	Ludwig Göransson	Nominated	
Seattle Film Critics Society	December 15, 2025	Best Production Design	Hannah Beachler and Monique Champagne	Nominated	
Seattle Film Critics Society	December 15, 2025	Best Action Choreography	Andy Gill	Nominated	
Seattle Film Critics Society	December 15, 2025	Best Visual Effects	Michael Ralla, Espen Nordahl, Guido Wolter, and Donnie Dean	Nominated	
Seattle Film Critics Society	December 15, 2025	Villain of the Year	Jack O'Connell	Nominated	
Society of Composers & Lyricists	February 6, 2026	Outstanding Original Score for a Studio Film	Ludwig Göransson	Won	
Society of Composers & Lyricists	February 6, 2026	Outstanding Original Song for a Dramatic or Documentary Visual Media Production	Raphael Saadiq and Ludwig Göransson (for "I Lied to You")	Won	
Society of Composers & Lyricists	February 6, 2026	Outstanding Original Song for a Dramatic or Documentary Visual Media Production	Alice Smith, Miles Caton, and Ludwig Göransson (for "Last Time (I Seen the Sun)")	Nominated	
Southeastern Film Critics Association	December 16, 2025	Top Ten Films	Sinners	Runner-up	
Southeastern Film Critics Association	December 16, 2025	Best Actor	Michael B. Jordan	Won	
Southeastern Film Critics Association	December 16, 2025	Best Ensemble	Sinners	Won	
Southeastern Film Critics Association	December 16, 2025	Best Director	Ryan Coogler	Won	
Southeastern Film Critics Association	December 16, 2025	Best Original Screenplay	Ryan Coogler	Won	
Southeastern Film Critics Association	December 16, 2025	Best Cinematography	Autumn Durald Arkapaw	Won	
Southeastern Film Critics Association	December 16, 2025	Best Score	Ludwig Göransson	Won	
St. Louis Film Critics Association Awards	December 14, 2025	Best Film	Sinners	Runner-up	
St. Louis Film Critics Association Awards	December 14, 2025	Best Director	Ryan Coogler	Runner-up	
St. Louis Film Critics Association Awards	December 14, 2025	Best Actor	Michael B. Jordan	Nominated	
St. Louis Film Critics Association Awards	December 14, 2025	Best Original Screenplay	Ryan Coogler	Nominated	
St. Louis Film Critics Association Awards	December 14, 2025	Best Ensemble	Sinners	Nominated	
St. Louis Film Critics Association Awards	December 14, 2025	Best Editing	Michael P. Shawver	Nominated	
St. Louis Film Critics Association Awards	December 14, 2025	Best Cinematography	Autumn Durald Arkapaw	Nominated	
St. Louis Film Critics Association Awards	December 14, 2025	Best Production Design	Hannah Beachler and Monique Champagne	Nominated	
St. Louis Film Critics Association Awards	December 14, 2025	Best Costume Design	Ruth E. Carter	Runner-up	
St. Louis Film Critics Association Awards	December 14, 2025	Best Score	Ludwig Göransson	Nominated	
St. Louis Film Critics Association Awards	December 14, 2025	Best Soundtrack	Sinners	Won	
St. Louis Film Critics Association Awards	December 14, 2025	Best Visual Effects	Michael Ralla, Espen Nordahl, Guido Wolter, and Donnie Dean	Nominated	
St. Louis Film Critics Association Awards	December 14, 2025	Best Horror Film	Sinners	Runner-up	
St. Louis Film Critics Association Awards	December 14, 2025	Best Scene	Music evolution "I Lied to You"	Won	
Toronto Film Critics Association	December 7, 2025	Best Picture	Sinners	Runner-up	
Toronto Film Critics Association	December 7, 2025	Best Director	Ryan Coogler	Runner-up	
Toronto Film Critics Association	December 7, 2025	Best Lead Performance	Michael B. Jordan	Runner-up	
Toronto Film Critics Association	December 7, 2025	Best Breakthrough Performance	Miles Caton	Runner-up	
Toronto Film Critics Association	December 7, 2025	Best Original Screenplay	Ryan Coogler	Won	
Visual Effects Society Awards	February 25, 2026	Outstanding Supporting Visual Effects in a Photoreal Feature	Michael Ralla, James Alexander, Nick Marshall, Espen Nordahl, and Donnie Dean	Won	
Washington D.C. Area Film Critics Association	December 7, 2025	Best Film	Sinners	Won	
Washington D.C. Area Film Critics Association	December 7, 2025	Best Director	Ryan Coogler	Won	
Washington D.C. Area Film Critics Association	December 7, 2025	Best Actor	Michael B. Jordan	Won	
Washington D.C. Area Film Critics Association	December 7, 2025	Best Supporting Actor	Delroy Lindo	Nominated	
Washington D.C. Area Film Critics Association	December 7, 2025	Best Supporting Actress	Wunmi Mosaku	Nominated	
Washington D.C. Area Film Critics Association	December 7, 2025	Best Youth Performance	Miles Caton	Won	
Washington D.C. Area Film Critics Association	December 7, 2025	Best Ensemble	Sinners	Won	
Washington D.C. Area Film Critics Association	December 7, 2025	Best Original Screenplay	Ryan Coogler	Won	
Washington D.C. Area Film Critics Association	December 7, 2025	Best Production Design	Hannah Beachler and Monique Champagne	Won	
Washington D.C. Area Film Critics Association	December 7, 2025	Best Cinematography	Autumn Durald Arkapaw	Won	
Washington D.C. Area Film Critics Association	December 7, 2025	Best Editing	Michael P. Shawver	Won	
Washington D.C. Area Film Critics Association	December 7, 2025	Best Score	Ludwig Göransson	Won	
Washington D.C. Area Film Critics Association	December 7, 2025	Best Stunts	Sinners	Nominated	
Writers Guild of America Awards	March 8, 2026	Best Original Screenplay	Ryan Coogler	Won	
