= First-dollar gross =

Filmmaking financial practice

First-dollar gross is a practice in filmmaking in which a participant receives a percentage of the gross box-office revenue, starting from a film's first day of release. The participant begins sharing in the revenue from the first ticket sale, not waiting until the film studio turns a profit. It is a film finance and distribution term used primarily in the United States film industry. In France, as of September 2003, one condition for filmmakers to get government support is that money must be reimbursed on the first-dollar gross basis. First-dollar gross has become a rare arrangement, and compensation has increasingly shifted away from first-dollar gross to back-end compensation. Some contracts define "first dollar" as a net figure after certain expense deductions rather than a true distributor's gross.

== Examples ==
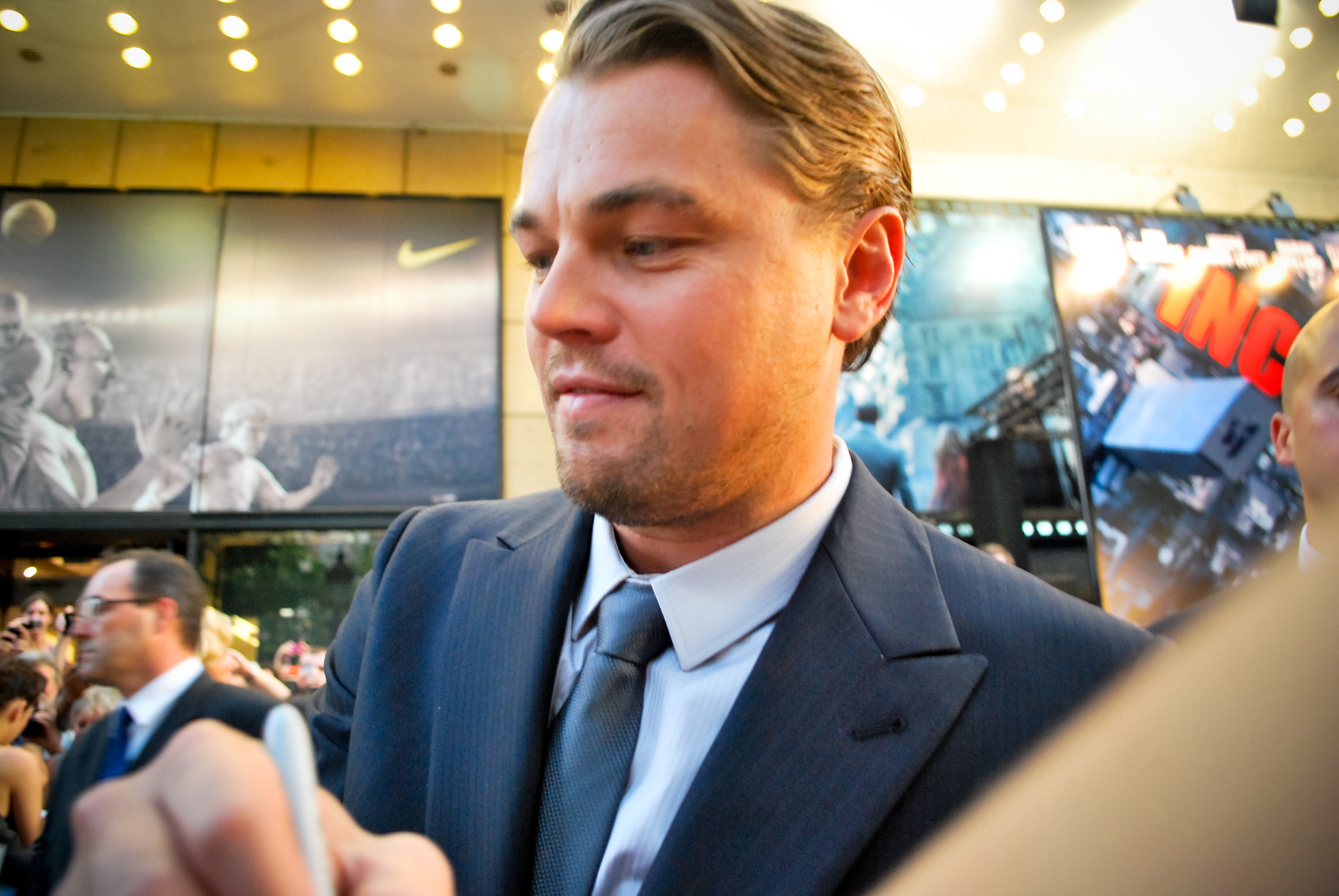
For Inception, DiCaprio chose to forgo his normal rate in favor of first-dollar gross.

If a film does well, a first-dollar gross arrangement can be very lucrative for the participant. Natalie Wood took 10 percent of the first-dollar gross on Bob & Carol & Ted & Alice, which according to Freddie Fields earned her more money than she did on any other movie. Cameron Diaz negotiated first-dollar gross on Bad Teacher, and netted $42 million. Sandra Bullock made more from her 15 percent first-dollar gross deal on Gravity than from her upfront pay of $20 million. In his heyday, Arnold Schwarzenegger received 25 percent first-dollar gross.

When Warner Bros. thought Inception was a risky investment, Leonardo DiCaprio agreed to cut his then-usual $20 million salary to a minimal salary with a first-dollar gross to make the film, which eventually paid him $50 million. Tom Hanks and Steven Spielberg shared a 40 percent first-dollar gross on Saving Private Ryan. Some other filmmakers known to have made first-dollar gross deals are Tyler Perry, Eli Roth, Clint Eastwood, Quentin Tarantino, Christopher Nolan, Ryan Coogler, actor Tom Cruise, and film producer Jason Blum. Many actors had earned $100 million later, after an initial payment. For example, Tom Cruise was paid between $12–14 million for his performance in Top Gun: Maverick, which was revised to over $100 million after his share of the film's box office gross.

== See also ==
- Film budgeting
- Hollywood accounting
