= Rocky (franchise) =

American media franchise

- Official franchise logo
- Created by: Sylvester Stallone
- Original work: Rocky (1976)
- Owner: Amazon MGM Studios
- Years: 1976–present

Films and television
- Films: Original series: Rocky (1976); Rocky II (1979); Rocky III (1982); Rocky IV (1985); Rocky V (1990); Rocky Balboa (2006); Spin-off series: Creed (2015); Creed II (2018); Creed III (2023)
- Short film: 40 Years of Rocky: The Birth of a Classic (2020)

Theatrical presentations
- Musical: Rocky the Musical (2012)

Games
- Video game: List: Rocky Super Action Boxing (1983); Rocky (1987); Rocky (2002); Rocky Legends (2004); Rocky Balboa (2006); Creed: Rise to Glory (2018)

Audio
- Soundtrack: List: Rocky: Original Motion Picture Score (1976); Rocky II: Music by Bill Conti (1979); Rocky III: Original Motion Picture Score (1982); Rocky IV: Original Motion Picture Soundtrack (1985); Rocky V: Music from and Inspired by the Motion Picture (1990); Rocky Balboa: The Best of Rocky (2006); Creed: Original Motion Picture Soundtrack (2015); Creed II: The Album (2018); Creed III: The Soundtrack and Creed III: Original Motion Picture Soundtrack (2023)
- Original music: List: Gonna Fly Now; Eye of the Tiger; Burning Heart; Heart's on Fire; No Easy Way Out; Living in America; Shea Butter Baby

Miscellaneous
- Character(s): List of characters

Rocky is an American sports drama multimedia franchise created by Sylvester Stallone, centering on the fictional life of boxer Rocky Balboa in Philadelphia, Pennsylvania, which began with the eponymous 1976 film and has since become a cultural phenomenon.

The original film Rocky was written by Stallone and directed by John G. Avildsen, and was followed by the sequels Rocky II (1979), Rocky III (1982), Rocky IV (1985), Rocky V (1990), and Rocky Balboa (2006). Stallone wrote each of the five sequels and directed four, with Avildsen returning to direct Rocky V.

A sequel film series followed, with Creed (2015), Creed II (2018), and Creed III (2023). The series stars Michael B. Jordan as boxer Adonis Creed, with Rocky as his trainer in the first two films. The Creed films were directed by Ryan Coogler, Steven Caple Jr., and Jordan respectively.

A fourth Creed film, a stand-alone Drago film, a prequel television series, and various other spin-offs are in development.

The first five films in the collective franchise were distributed by United Artists, the seventh and eighth films were distributed by Warner Bros. Pictures, and the sixth and ninth films were distributed by Metro-Goldwyn-Mayer.

Rocky, Rocky III, and Creed were nominated for Academy Awards, with the first winning Best Picture, Best Director for Avildsen, and Best Film Editing, and is considered one of the greatest sports films of all time. Stallone was nominated for Best Actor and Best Supporting Actor for his performance in the first film and Creed, respectively. Rocky has influenced landmarks and popular culture; the entrance to the Philadelphia Museum of Art has become known as the Rocky Steps while phrases like "Yo, Adrian!" and "If he dies, he dies" have become part of lexicon or widely memed. Balboa is also considered one of the most iconic fictional characters, and the franchise is closely linked with its successful theme songs, including "Gonna Fly Now", "Eye of the Tiger", and "Burning Heart".

== Films ==
Film	U.S. release date	Director(s)	Screenwriter(s)	Story by	Producer(s)
Original series
Rocky	December 3, 1976	John G. Avildsen	Sylvester Stallone	Sylvester Stallone	Irwin Winkler and Robert Chartoff
Rocky II	June 15, 1979	Sylvester Stallone	Sylvester Stallone	Sylvester Stallone	Irwin Winkler and Robert Chartoff
Rocky III	May 28, 1982	Sylvester Stallone	Sylvester Stallone	Sylvester Stallone	Irwin Winkler and Robert Chartoff
Rocky IV	November 27, 1985	Sylvester Stallone	Sylvester Stallone	Sylvester Stallone	Irwin Winkler and Robert Chartoff
Rocky V	November 16, 1990	John G. Avildsen	Sylvester Stallone	Sylvester Stallone	Irwin Winkler and Robert Chartoff
Rocky Balboa	December 20, 2006	Sylvester Stallone	Sylvester Stallone	Sylvester Stallone	David Winkler, Charles Winkler, William Chartoff and Kevin King-Templeton
Spin-off series
Creed	November 25, 2015	Ryan Coogler	Ryan Coogler and Aaron Covington	Ryan Coogler	Irwin Winkler, David Winkler, Charles Winkler, William Chartoff, Robert Chartoff, Kevin King-Templeton and Sylvester Stallone
Creed II	November 21, 2018	Steven Caple Jr.	Juel Taylor and Sylvester Stallone	Sascha Penn and Cheo Hodari Coker	Irwin Winkler, David Winkler, Charles Winkler, William Chartoff, Kevin King-Templeton, Sylvester Stallone and Ian Sharples
Creed III	March 3, 2023	Michael B. Jordan	Zach Baylin & Keenan Coogler	Ryan Coogler and Zach Baylin & Keenan Coogler	Irwin Winkler, David Winkler, Charles Winkler, William Chartoff, Kevin King-Templeton, Sylvester Stallone, Ryan Coogler, Michael B. Jordan and Jonathan Glickman

=== Rocky (1976) ===
Rocky Balboa (Sylvester Stallone) is a small-time boxer who works as a collector for a loan shark and fights in small venues for low pay. His gym trainer, Mickey Goldmill (Burgess Meredith), is frustrated at Balboa's wasted potential. At the same time, Rocky courts Adrian Pennino (Talia Shire), a painfully shy woman with an alcoholic brother, Paulie (Burt Young), Rocky's best friend. But when world heavyweight champion boxer Apollo Creed (Carl Weathers) chooses Rocky at random as his opponent in a title fight, Rocky realizes he has the chance to prove his worth. With Adrian's support, sponsorship offers with the help from Paulie, and Mickey becoming his trainer and manager, Rocky is determined to go the distance with Creed and fights for his self-respect.

=== Rocky II (1979) ===
Soon after proving himself, even through he suffers a split decision loss to Apollo Creed, Rocky marries Adrian and begins spending the money he earned from the match. But after he fails at both endorsements and a series of low-wage jobs, Rocky realizes that the only way he can survive is to begin boxing again. Creed, on the other hand, faces criticism from fans as well as his own knowledge he did not give his best in the fight. As a result, he publicly taunts Rocky into a rematch, for which Rocky trains once again with Mickey. In the fifteenth round, Rocky knocks Creed to the ground, falling to the canvas himself in the process. Both fighters struggle to get to their feet, but only Rocky is successful, and is declared the World Heavyweight Champion.

=== Rocky III (1982) ===
After winning the heavyweight title, Rocky takes advantage of his newfound wealth and fame, appearing in multiple advertisements, charity and fundraisers, and television programs. After defending the title multiple times, he is prepared to retire, but the number one contender, Clubber Lang (Mr. T), challenges Rocky publicly. Mickey suffers a heart attack before the fight, and Rocky is knocked out by Lang in the second round. Mickey dies after the fight, and Rocky's former rival Apollo Creed steps in, training Rocky to fight in Creed's old Los Angeles gym. In the rematch, Rocky outboxes Lang, eventually knocking him out in the third round. After the fight, Apollo calls in his "favor" for training Rocky, which is a one-on-one sparring match between the two of them with no cameras or media in the gym. The film ends as they each throw their first punch.

=== Rocky IV (1985) ===
After winning back his title from Clubber Lang, Rocky and Apollo are good friends. However, a new fighter from the USSR, Ivan Drago (Dolph Lundgren), arrives in the USA along with his wife, trainer, and training team. Motivated by patriotism, Apollo challenges Drago to an exhibition match, but the beating he takes from Drago ends with Apollo dying in Rocky's arms in the ring as Drago coldly watches. To avenge Apollo, Rocky challenges Drago to a match, which is to be held on Christmas Day in Moscow. Rocky trains in a remote cabin in Siberia with the help of Creed's old trainer Duke, his brother-in-law Paulie, and eventually Adrian, doing exercises such as chopping wood, lifting rocks, running in the snow and climbing a mountain, while Drago is seen in an advanced training facility running on treadmills, using weightlifting machines and injecting steroids to boost his strength. During the fight, Rocky takes a fierce pounding of his life but refuses to fall. He eventually wins over the Russian crowd with his display of courage and determination, and knocks Drago out with seconds left in the final round.

=== Rocky V (1990) ===
In the aftermath of his fight with Ivan Drago, Rocky Balboa is diagnosed with brain damage and is forced to retire from the ring. Additionally, the Balboas' fortune is all gone due to an unscrupulous accountant. Rocky's family returns to their old neighbourhood and Adrian returns to the pet store she used to work at, while Rocky (Robert) Jr. (Sylvester Stallone's real son Sage) deals with bullying at his school and Rocky re-opens Mickey's old gym. While training other boxers, Rocky meets a young, hungry boxer named Tommy Gunn (real-life fighter Tommy Morrison) and begins training him, which results in a strained relationship with Robert. As Tommy begins his rise to fame under Rocky's wing, fight promoter George Washington Duke convinces Tommy to leave Rocky. After Tommy wins the heavyweight title, he thanks Duke instead of Rocky, and is met with jeers from the crowd. Tommy seeks out his former mentor for a final showdown. After Tommy punches Paulie, Rocky then challenges Tommy outside and the two proceed in a violent street brawl, which Rocky wins. Rocky then punches Duke for harassing him. Rocky and Robert reconcile.

=== Rocky Balboa (2006) ===
Sixteen years since his fight with his former protégé, Tommy Gunn, Rocky still staggers around an ever-changing world; he and Robert have grown distant, Paulie is working back at the meat plant, and Rocky's wife Adrian has died from ovarian cancer. Rocky runs a restaurant in Philadelphia named after his wife, which he stocks with mementos of his prime as he tells his old fight stories to his customers. But when a computer-simulated fight on ESPN depicting a bout between a young Rocky Balboa and the current champion, Mason Dixon (Antonio Tarver) depicts Rocky emerging victorious, Rocky discovers he has not lost his fighting spirit and considers an opportunity to prove himself in the ring once again. Rocky goes the distance with Dixon but loses in a split decision just like the first film. Rocky is last seen visiting his wife's grave saying, "Yo, Adrian, we did it".

=== Creed (2015) ===
Adonis "Donnie" Johnson (Michael B. Jordan), the extra-marital son of the late former heavyweight champion Apollo Creed, tracks down Rocky Balboa at Adrian's and asks Rocky to become his trainer. Rocky is reluctant but eventually agrees. When word gets out that Adonis is Creed's son, the handlers of world light heavyweight champion "Pretty" Ricky Conlan, who is forced into retirement by an impending prison term, offer to make Adonis the latter's final challenger—provided that he change his name to Adonis Creed. Adonis balks at first, wanting to forge his own legacy, but he eventually agrees. While helping Adonis train, Rocky learns he has non-Hodgkin's lymphoma. He is initially unwilling to undergo chemotherapy because he sees the cancer as a chance to reunite with his deceased loved ones. Adonis persuades Rocky to seek treatment and continues training while Rocky recovers. In a battle reminiscent of Apollo and Rocky's first fight, Adonis fights Conlan in Conlan's hometown of Liverpool and surprises almost everyone by going the distance and pushing Conlan to his limit. Conlan wins by split decision, but Adonis wins the respect of Conlan and the crowd, with Conlan calling Adonis the future of the light heavyweight division. Returning to Philadelphia, Adonis and a recovering Rocky make their way up the Philadelphia Museum steps and look at the skyline.

=== Creed II (2018) ===
Three years after losing the fight to "Pretty" Ricky Conlan, Adonis Johnson Creed wins the World Heavyweight Championship and proposes to his girlfriend, Bianca Taylor (Tessa Thompson). Meanwhile, three decades since the death of Apollo Creed and his loss to Rocky Balboa, Ivan Drago is training his son, Viktor Drago (Florian Munteanu), to reclaim their honor by having Viktor publicly challenge Adonis for the World Heavyweight Title. Rocky is reluctant to train Adonis, fearing Adonis will meet the same fate as his father, but Adonis accepts the challenge without him and is badly injured during the fight. Because of Viktor's disqualification, Adonis retains the title. Viktor demands a rematch, while he is being promoted by his father's supporters who originally abandoned Drago, including Drago's ex-wife, Ludmilla (Brigitte Nielsen). Viktor is subjected to vicious training sessions in preparation for the rematch. Rocky comes to Adonis' aid and decides to train him in the Southern California desert, with a different tactic for Adonis to take in Viktor's powerful punches. The rematch is set in Moscow, and Adonis is able to take Viktor's punches, leaving Viktor exhausted. Viktor's supporters and his mother leave during the fight after Adonis gains the upper hand. Drago, seeing his son taking Adonis’ punches without fighting back, throws in the towel and assures Viktor that he is more important to him and that he will not abandon him like he was. While Rocky later reunites with his son, Robert (Milo Ventimiglia), and meets his grandson, Adonis goes to his late father's grave, making peace with his late father and honoring his legacy.

=== Creed III (2023) ===
In 2024, six years after beating Viktor Drago, Donnie has retired from boxing to focus on his wife Bianca and their 6-year-old daughter Amara (Mila Davis-Kent), whose hearing impairment has since led the family to become fluent in American Sign Language. Donnie runs the Delphi Boxing Academy with Tony "Little Duke" Evers Jr. (Wood Harris) and is promoting his protégé, world champion Felix "El Guerrero" Chavez, in a match against Drago. Released from prison, childhood friend Dame Anderson (Jonathan Majors) reconnects with Donnie and shares his desire to resume his boxing career. Donnie reluctantly invites Dame to the gym, and hires him as Chavez's sparring partner, but his presence draws scorn from Chavez and Duke as Dame is overly aggressive and hostile. Dame later visits Donnie's home, where he meets his family and recounts their time together at a group home, a story that Bianca had never heard. Privately, Dame asks for a title shot against Chavez, but Donnie declines. After Drago is attacked by an unknown assailant at a party for Bianca's record label, which casts doubt on his ability to participate in his upcoming fight, Donnie nominates Dame as Drago's replacement. Despite it being his first professional bout, Dame manages to win the Unified Heavyweight Championship by implementing dirty tactics. Realizing that Dame planned the attack on Drago, Donnie confronts him, and Dame admits that he manipulated him into getting the title shot. Meanwhile, Adonis' adopted mother, Mary-Anne suffers another stroke and dies. Publicly taunted by Dame and encouraged by Bianca, Donnie decides to come out of retirement and challenges Dame for the championship, which he accepts. After training with Duke and a recovered Drago, Donnie faces Dame in the "Battle of Los Angeles" at Dodger Stadium. In the final round, Donnie has visions of his abusive foster home and Dame's life in jail, which leads to Donnie being knocked down. He manages to just beat the count, then goes on to knock Dame out and regain the championship. Afterward, Donnie reconciles with Dame, with both men admitting it was not the other's fault. Donnie then joins Bianca and Amara in the ring in the empty stadium, where he pretends to box with Amara.

=== Future ===
==== Drago (TBA) ====
In November 2021, Dolph Lundgren revealed that there are developments for a film centered around his character Ivan Drago. By July 2022, the project was officially announced by MGM with Robert Lawton serving as screenwriter on the project. Lawton had previously completed a spec script for a movie pitch centered around the making of the first Rocky film. Though the studio did not choose to develop that script, studio executives were impressed enough to hire the writer for the Drago film. The screenplay is stated to be centered around Ivan Drago's backstory.

The announcement of the spin-off movie was met with criticism by franchise creator, Stallone. He stated that, while he has tried to attain part of the rights to a franchise he was instrumental in creating, the producers have been "exploiting" his characters while trying to keep him out of the creative team. Following Stallone's response, Lundgren stated that he immediately reached out to his friend, explaining that when the project had been presented to him, he had been informed that Stallone would be involved as a producer, as well as appearing in the movie, having been unaware that Stallone had not yet been approached on announcing the spin-off; the actor further stated that the project had yet to be officially green-lit. While Stallone's reactions were perceived as uncharacteristic to his public image, he later stated that he has since discussed the potential movie with Lundgren.

In March 2023, it was reported that developments on the project are ongoing. By April, Lundgren stated that the script was undergoing rewrites as the previous draft wasn't satisfactory for everyone. He expressed hopes that Stallone would be involved with the project through producing, but also was hopeful that he would appear in the movie. In January 2024, Lundgren stated that while the studio had prioritized the Creed movies, the project is still in development. The actor revealed that the plot will center around the characters of Ivan and Viktor Drago; with the pair deciding to leave Russia after the country's invasion of Ukraine, and immigrating to the United States.

==== Creed IV (TBA) ====
In February 2023, Jordan announced that a fourth Creed film was in development, in which he would be reprising the role of Adonis "Donnie" Creed. In March 2025, Jordan told The Hollywood Reporter, "I would like to work with [Jonathan] Majors again. I would love to make Creed IV together — among other projects."

==== Untitled seventh Rocky film (TBA) ====
In May 2019, at the Cannes Film Festival, Sylvester Stallone said that he had another story about Rocky Balboa. By July, Stallone confirmed that a sequel/follow-up to the current film series is in development. The project will be a joint-production venture between Winkler Films Production and MGM. Stallone will serve as writer in addition to starring in the film.

Conceptualized as an epilogue story, the film is said to be about Rocky befriending a young fighter who is a foreigner, stuck illegally in the United States. Stallone states: "Rocky meets a young, angry person who got stuck in this country when he comes to see his sister. He takes him into his life, and unbelievable adventures begin, and they wind up south of the border. It's very, very timely". By May 2020, Stallone said that he is still working on the film, though it has not yet been officially green-lit by the studio. However, in a November 2021 Instagram post, Stallone expressed doubt about the film being greenlit, due to his souring relationship with producer Irwin Winkler. In November 2022, Stallone confirmed that the studio wants another Rocky film, but that negotiations to attain part of the rights to the character from the producers stalled development. He further stated that he is writing the script and that if the studio likes his work, the film will be made.

In February 2023, Stallone posted the first page of the script on a since deleted Instagram post, showing his fans a glimpse at the work he had put into the project. The filmmaker once again expressed doubt that the film will be produced, owing to his feud with Winkler over rights to the franchise. By October 2026, Stallone confirmed that he had written a script for a seventh film, which would explore the character's continued life outside of his boxing career; though the filmmaker stated he wrote the story for himself, while casting further doubt that it may be greenlit by associated studios.

== Short film ==
Film	US release date	Director(s)	Screenwriter(s)
Creed: Shinjidai	September 22, 2023	Yô Moriyama	Katsuhiko Manabe & Kensaku Kojima

=== Creed: Shinjidai (2023) ===
In May 2023, Michael B. Jordan announced that an anime-styled animated short would be released in Japan at the end of the credits to Creed III. The project was directed by Yô Moriyama, with a script co-written by Katsuhiko Manabe and Kensaku Kojima. The short is a joint-venture production between TMS Animation and Outlier Society Productions. Inspired by his affection for manga and anime mediums, Jordan used the genre as inspiration for scenes in his directorial feature film, with the director/actor commissioning the animation studio to develop a short that could be attached to the end of his movie.

The short film was released in Japan on May 26, 2023; followed by a limited theatrical release in the United States on September 22, 2023; while a world-wide debut will happen at a later date. Officially titled Creed: Shinjidai, the short is a sci-fi interplanetary oriented story about three young boxers in outerspace.

== Television ==
=== Rocky prequel series ===
In July 2019, Sylvester Stallone announced that there are "ongoing discussions" about a Rocky prequel television series, with the project intended to premiere on a streaming service platform. Film series producer, Irwin Winkler however, is said to be hesitant in making a television series with concerns regarding how the story would translate to television. As an official production start has not yet been announced, Stallone stated: "There was some conflict there, yes. ...so there was a big bone of contention".

In March 2021, Stallone revealed he had started working on the script for a prequel series that will take place during the 1960s, with intention for the show to be developed as a streaming exclusive with multiple seasons, each consisting of ten episodes. By May, Stallone said that though there are "certain complications" with developing the series, but that he would "keep punching". Despite this setback, later that month as the acquisition of MGM by Amazon for $8.45 billion had initiated, Mike Hopkins (Senior Vice President of Amazon Prime Video and Amazon Studios) identified the Rocky franchise as one of the major assets in the purchase. He also stated that the "value behind this deal is the treasure trove of IP in the deep catalog that we plan to reimagine and develop together with MGM's talented team".

In November 2022, Stallone confirmed that his prequel script which was previously turned down by producers is once again in development for a streaming company. He stated that Amazon's new inclusion in the franchise is responsible for the progress of the project. In March 2023, it was reported that Amazon intends to expand the franchise, with various projects in development including Stallone's previously identified series. Stallone is expected to be involved with its development. In April of the same year, Stallone signed a collaborative contract for his studio Balboa Productions with MGM and their parent company Amazon Studios, for various television and film projects moving forward. As a part of the negotiation, a series expanding the Rocky franchise was confirmed as being in development from the associated studios.

In September 2024, Stallone detailed his continued work in writing the series, while also confirming that the plot centers around younger-aged Rocky, Adrian, and Paulie. By October of 2026, Stallone confirmed the potential for a prequel television series or film; explaining that the project would explore the characters during the 1960s.

=== Creed spin-off series ===
In March 2023, it was announced that Michael B. Jordan would be involved with expanding the franchise with additional Creed spin-offs on Amazon Prime Video. These projects in discussion include an anime series, a live-action series, and a project centered around the daughter of Adonis named Amara Creed. In April of the same year, television projects expanding on Creed were confirmed as being in development.

In May 2025, it was announced that a spin-off series tentatively titled Delphi, had been picked up by Amazon Prime Video. The series will be set in the gym of the same name from the Rocky and Creed films and will focus on a group of young boxers. By May of 2026, the premise was stated to follow a group of gifted young atheletes that join the elite boxing academy in hopes of realizing their dreams. The principal cast was announced to include Wood Harris reprising his role from the Creed films as Tony "Little Duke" Burton; alongside new cast members Benji Santiago as Santi Torres, Juan Castrano as Nico Torres, Demián Bichir as Hector Torres, André Holland as Teddy "T-Bone" Parker, Andre Royo as Elmer Tatum, Sofia Black-D'Elia as Bobbi Weiss, and Victoria Vourkoutiotis as Kai Katsaros. Marco Ramirez will act as showrunner, in addition to acting as executive producer alongside Michael B. Jordan, Liz Raposo, Irwin Winkler, David Winkler, Charles Winkler, William Chartoff, Philipp A. Barnett, Jennifer Johnson and José Padilha. The project will be a joint-venture production between Amazon MGM Studios, Outlier Society Productions, and Winkler Films.

== Main cast and characters ==
List indicators

This section includes characters who will appear or have appeared in the franchise in notable roles.

- An empty grey cell indicates the character was not in the film, or that the character's official presence has not yet been confirmed.
- ^{A} indicates an appearance through archival footage or audio.
- ^{P} indicates an appearance in onscreen photographs.
- ^{Y} indicates a younger version of the character.

Character	Films								
Character	Rocky	Rocky II	Rocky III	Rocky IV	Rocky V	Rocky Balboa	Creed	Creed II	Creed III
Character	1976	1979	1982	1985	1990	2006	2015	2018	2023
Robert "Rocky" Balboa	Sylvester Stallone	Sylvester Stallone	Sylvester Stallone	Sylvester Stallone	Sylvester Stallone	Sylvester Stallone	Sylvester Stallone	Sylvester Stallone	
Adrianna "Adrian" Pennino Balboa	Talia Shire	Talia Shire	Talia Shire	Talia Shire	Talia Shire	Talia Shire^{A}	Talia Shire^{A}	Talia Shire^{A}	
Paul "Paulie" Pennino	Burt Young	Burt Young	Burt Young	Burt Young	Burt Young	Burt Young			
Apollo Creed	Carl Weathers	Carl Weathers	Carl Weathers	Carl Weathers	Carl Weathers^{A}		Carl Weathers^{A}	Carl Weathers^{A}	Carl Weathers^{P}
Michael "Mickey" Goldmill	Burgess Meredith	Burgess Meredith	Burgess Meredith	Burgess Meredith^{A}	Burgess Meredith	Burgess Meredith^{A}	Burgess Meredith^{P}		
Tony "Duke" Evers	Tony Burton	Tony Burton	Tony Burton	Tony Burton	Tony Burton	Tony Burton	Tony Burton^{A}	Tony Burton^{A}	Tony Burton^{P}
Mary Anne Creed	Lavelle Roby	Sylvia Meals		Sylvia Meals			Phylicia Rashad	Phylicia Rashad	Phylicia Rashad
Tony Gazzo	Joe Spinell	Joe Spinell	Joe Spinell^{A}						
Spider Rico	Pedro Lovell			Pedro Lovell^{A}		Pedro Lovell			
Marie	Jodi Letizia					Geraldine Hughes			
Robert Balboa Jr.		Seargeoh Stallone	Ina Fried	Rocky Krakoff	Sage Stallone	Milo Ventimiglia	Sage Stallone^{P}	Milo Ventimiglia	
James "Clubber" Lang			Mr. T	Mr. T^{A}	Mr. T^{A}	Mr. T^{A}			
Ivan Drago				Dolph Lundgren	Dolph Lundgren^{A}	Dolph Lundgren^{A}		Dolph Lundgren	
Ludmilla Drago				Brigitte Nielsen				Brigitte Nielsen	
Tommy "The Machine" Gunn					Tommy Morrison				
George Washington Duke					Richard Gant				
Mason "The Line" Dixon						Antonio Tarver			
Adonis "Donnie" Creed							Michael B. Jordan Alex Henderson^{Y}	Michael B. Jordan	Michael B. Jordan Thaddeus J. Mixson^{Y}
Bianca Taylor-Creed							Tessa Thompson	Tessa Thompson	Tessa Thompson
Danny "Stuntman" Wheeler							Andre Ward	Andre Ward	
Tony "Little Duke" Burton							Wood Harris	Wood Harris	Wood Harris
"Pretty" Ricky Conlan							Tony Bellew		Tony Bellew
Viktor Drago								Florian Munteanu	Florian Munteanu
Amara Creed								Hendrix McDaniel	Mila Davis-Kent
Damian "Diamond Dame" Anderson									Jonathan Majors Spence Moore II^{Y}

== Additional crew and production details ==
Film	Composer	Cinematographer	Editor(s)	Production companies	Distributing company	Running time
Rocky	Bill Conti	James Crabe	Scott Conrad & Richard Halsey	Chartoff-Winkler Productions	United Artists Corporation	119 min
Rocky II	Bill Conti	Bill Butler	Janice Hampton, Stanford C. Allen & Danford B. Greene	Chartoff-Winkler Productions	United Artists Corporation	120 min
Rocky III	Bill Conti	Bill Butler	Mark Warner & Don Zimmerman	United Artists	MGM/UA Entertainment Company	100 min
Rocky IV	Vince DiCola	Bill Butler	Don Zimmerman & John W. Wheeler	United Artists; Metro-Goldwyn-Mayer	MGM/UA Entertainment Company	91 min
Rocky V	Bill Conti	Steven Poster	Michael N. Knue, John G. Avildsen & Robert A. Ferreti	United Artists; Star Partners III Ltd.	MGM/UA Entertainment Company	104 min
Rocky Balboa	Bill Conti	Clark Mathis	Sean Albertson	United Artists; Revolution Studios; Metro-Goldwyn-Mayer; Chartoff-Winkler Productions; Columbia Pictures Corporation	MGM Distribution Co.	102 min
Creed	Ludwig Göransson	Maryse Alberti	Michael Shawver & Claudia Castello	New Line Cinema; Warner Bros. Pictures; Chartoff-Winkler Productions; Metro-Goldwyn-Mayer Pictures	Warner Bros. Pictures	133 min
Creed II	Ludwig Göransson	Kramer Morgenthau	Paul Harb, Saira Haider & Dana E. Glauberman	New Line Cinema; Balboa Productions; Warner Bros. Pictures; Metro-Goldwyn-Mayer Studios	Annapurna Pictures; Metro-Goldwyn-Mayer	130 min
Creed III	Joseph Shirley	Kramer Morgenthau	Tyler Nelson & Jessica Baclesse	Proximity Media; Chartoff-Irwin Productions; Metro-Goldwyn-Mayer Studios	Metro-Goldwyn-Mayer	116 min

== Reception ==
=== Box office performance ===
Film	Box office gross			Box office ranking		Budget	Ref.
Film	North America	Other territories	Worldwide	All time North America	All time worldwide	Budget	Ref.
Rocky	$117,235,147	$107,764,853	$225,000,000	No. 552 #84 ^{(A)}		$1 million	
Rocky II	$85,182,160	$115,000,000	$200,182,160	No. 863 #253 ^{(A)}		$7 million	
Rocky III	$125,049,125	$145,000,000	$270,000,000	No. 498 #160 ^{(A)}		$17 million	
Rocky IV	$127,873,716	$172,600,000	$300,473,716	No. 471 #235 ^{(A)}	No. 451	$28 million	
Rocky V	$40,946,358	$79,000,000	$119,946,358	#2,027		$42 million	
Rocky Balboa	$70,270,943	$85,658,077	$155,929,020	#1,124		$24 million	
Creed	$109,778,883	$63,800,000	$173,578,883	No. 610		$35 million	
Creed II	$115,715,889	$98,500,000	$214,215,889	No. 568	No. 713	$50 million	
Creed III	$156,196,108	$117,600,000	$273,796,108	#442	#664	$75 million	
Total	$948,248,326	$984,873,805	$1,932,913,202	No. 26 #12 ^{(A)}		$279 million	
List indicators: A dark grey cell indicates information is not available for the film.^{(A)} indicates the adjusted totals based on current ticket prices (calculated by Box Office Mojo).; Rocky III gross includes 1983 re-releases.

=== Critical and public response ===
The Rocky series as a whole has received mixed reviews. The first two films as well as sixth film received positive reviews, while the third, fourth and fifth films received mixed reviews. The Creed series as a whole has received positive reviews.

Film	Rotten Tomatoes	Metacritic	CinemaScore
Rocky	95% (141 reviews)	70/100 (14 reviews)	—N/a
Rocky II	70% (90 reviews)	61/100 (9 reviews)	—N/a
Rocky III	66% (92 reviews)	57/100 (10 reviews)	A+
Rocky IV	38% (134 reviews)	40/100 (13 reviews)	—N/a
Rocky V	36% (122 reviews)	55/100 (16 reviews)	A
Rocky Balboa	78% (180 reviews)	63/100 (36 reviews)	B+
Creed	95% (313 reviews)	82/100 (42 reviews)	A
Creed II	83% (312 reviews)	66/100 (45 reviews)	A
Creed III	89% (342 reviews)	73/100 (61 reviews)	A–

=== Accolades ===
At the 49th Academy Awards, Rocky was nominated for ten Academy Awards. Sylvester Stallone was nominated for the Academy Award for Best Actor, and Best Original Screenplay, with Talia Shire also being nominated for Best Actress, and both Burgess Meredith and Burt Young being nominated for Best Supporting Actor. "Gonna Fly Now" was nominated for Best Original Song, and Rocky itself was nominated for Best Sound Editing, and won Best Picture, Best Director for John G. Avildsen, and Best Film Editing. At the 55th Academy Awards, the song "Eye of the Tiger" from Rocky III was nominated for Best Original Song.

On December 7, 2010, Stallone was inducted into the International Boxing Hall of Fame and Museum, for paying tribute to boxers in writing and creating the underdog character of Rocky. In January 2016, Stallone won the Golden Globe Award for Best Supporting Actor for his role in Creed. At the 88th Academy Awards, Stallone was nominated for the Academy Award for Best Supporting Actor for his performance in Creed, the film's only nomination. In total, the Rocky series has received twelve Academy Awards nominations, winning three.

Award	Rocky	Rocky II	Rocky III	Rocky IV	Rocky V	Rocky Balboa	Creed	Creed II	Creed III
Picture	Won								
Director	Won								
Actor	Nominated (Sylvester Stallone)								
Actress	Nominated (Talia Shire)								
Supporting Actor	Nominated (Burgess Meredith)						Nominated (Sylvester Stallone)		
Supporting Actor	Nominated (Burt Young)						Nominated (Sylvester Stallone)		
Original Screenplay	Nominated	Ineligible							
Film Editing	Won								
Original Song	Nominated ("Gonna Fly Now")		Nominated ("Eye of the Tiger")						
Sound	Nominated								

== Music ==
=== Soundtracks ===
Title	U.S. release date	Length	Composer(s)	Label
Rocky: Original Motion Picture Score	November 12, 1976	31:25	Bill Conti	United Artists Records; EMI Records/Capitol Records (reissue)
Rocky II: Music by Bill Conti	August 25, 1979	35:04	Bill Conti	United Artists Records – LP; EMI Manhattan Records – CD
Rocky III: Original Motion Picture Score	March 9, 1982	32:00	Bill Conti	Liberty Records
Rocky IV: Original Motion Picture Soundtrack	November 27, 1985	39:24	Various	Scotti Brothers Records
Rocky V: Music from and Inspired by the Motion Picture	November 12, 1990	45:19	Various	Capitol Records
Rocky Balboa: The Best of Rocky	December 26, 2006	60:06	Various	Capitol Records
Rocky Broadway	May 27, 2014	57:03	Lynn Ahrens; Stephen Flaherty	Universal Music Enterprises
Creed: Original Motion Picture Soundtrack	November 20, 2015	69:38	Various	Atlantic Records
Creed: Original Motion Picture Score	November 20, 2015	59:27	Ludwig Göransson	WaterTower Music
Creed II: The Album	November 16, 2018	53:52	Various	Interscope Records; Ear Drummer Records
Creed II: Original Motion Picture Soundtrack	November 16, 2018	50:49	Ludwig Göransson	Sony Classical Records
Creed III: The Soundtrack	March 3, 2023		Various	Dreamville Records
Creed III: Original Motion Picture Soundtrack	March 3, 2023	56:37	Joseph Shirley	Sony Classical Records

=== Singles ===
- "Gonna Fly Now"
- "Eye of the Tiger"
- "Burning Heart"
- "Heart's on Fire"
- "Living in America"
- "Shea Butter Baby"

== Other media ==
=== Musical ===
A Broadway musical was written by Stephen Flaherty and Lynn Ahrens (lyrics and music), with the book by Thomas Meehan, based on the film. The musical premiered in Hamburg, Germany in October 2012. Performances commenced at the Winter Garden Theater on Broadway on February 11, 2014, and officially opened on March 13.

=== Novelizations ===
- Rocky: Upon the first film, a paperback novelization of the screenplay was written by Stallone and Rosalyn Drexler under the pseudonym Julia Sorel, and published by Ballantine Books in 1976.
- Rocky II: A novelization written by Sylvester Stallone, was published by Ballantine Books in 1979. The book is a first-person narrative told from the perspective of Rocky Balboa.
- Rocky III: A novelization written by Robert E. Hoban was published by Ballantine Books in 1982.
- Rocky IV: A novelization written by Sylvester Stallone, was published by Ballantine Books in 1985.
- Rocky the Musical: A script written by Thomas Meehan and Sylvester Stallone, was published by Hal Leonard in 2014.

=== Comic books ===
A manga adaptation of Rocky was published in May 1977 in Monthly Shonen Magazine, written and drawn by female mangaka Tamiki Noda.

In July 2023, Boom Studios released Creed: The Next Round, written by LaToya Morgan and Jai Jamison and illustrated by Wilton Santos, starring Amara Creed and showcasing her fighting career ten years after Creed III.

=== Video games ===
Various licensed video games for various arcade and home console systems were released including:

- Rocky Super Action Boxing – based on Rocky III and released in 1983.
- Rocky – based on Rocky, Rocky II, Rocky III and Rocky IV. Released in 1987.
- Rocky – based on Rocky, Rocky II, Rocky III, Rocky IV and Rocky V. Released in 2002.
- Rocky Legends – based on Rocky, Rocky II, Rocky III and Rocky IV. Released in 2004.
- Rocky Balboa – based on Rocky Balboa and released in 2007.
- Rocky – A mobile video game, based on the franchise and released in 2016.
- Creed: Rise to Glory – Based on Creed and released in 2018.
- Big Rumble Boxing: Creed Champions – based on Rocky-Creed II and released in 2021.

An unofficial Rocky video game was published by Dinamic Software for the ZX Spectrum in 1985 but was later retitled to Rocco.

=== Documentaries ===
Rocky is featured in the 2017 documentary John G. Avildsen: King of the Underdogs about Academy Award-winning Rocky director John G. Avildsen, directed and produced by Derek Wayne Johnson.

Stallone later hand-picked Johnson to direct and produce a documentary on the making of the original Rocky, entitled 40 Years of Rocky: The Birth of a Classic, which was released in 2020. The documentary features Stallone narrating behind-the-scenes footage from the making of the film.

=== Alternate cut releases ===
A director's cut edition of Rocky IV was originally scheduled to commemorate its 35th anniversary. Ongoing editing ultimately pushed the release date, with Stallone finishing his editing sometime in January 2021. In all, approximately 38 minutes of previously unreleased footage were added to the film, including significant extensions of both fight scenes and the Apollo Creed funeral scene. One reported cut was that of Paulie's robot. Robert Doornick, founder of International Robotics and the voice of the robot, commented that Stallone cut all of the robot scenes in the director's cut to save money on royalty fees that were given to Doornick in the original cut. The cut missed its original November 27, 2020, release, though by February 2021 Stallone stated that they were in the final stages of completing the project. His cut of the film was finished in April. This version had a one-night limited theatrical release on November 11, 2021, and was additionally released in digital formats the following day under the title Rocky IV: Rocky vs. Drago.

In October 2026, Stallone announced plans to create a new cut of Rocky V. The filmmaker expressed ongoing personal regrets that he chose to not direct the movie, and stated that he has been working with Amazon MGM Studios to develop an alternate version that has his official stamp of approval. Stallone stated: "[it's] a thorn in my side...It bothers me to death because I know I took my foot off the gas...[the recut]'s not going to be great. It’ll be acceptable."

=== In popular culture ===
The 2016 film Chuck depicts Chuck Wepner, his 1975 title fight with the heavyweight champion, Muhammad Ali, and the fight's influence on the screenplay for Rocky.

In May 2024, a biographical drama film was announced with Peter Farrelly directing the and Peter Gamble writing the script. Titled I Play Rocky, the movie centers around the tumultuous making of the film. The film is set to be released on November 6, 2026.

== Canceled projects ==
In the January 2022 issue of Empire, published in November 2021, Ralph Macchio revealed that he had previously been approached about a potential Rocky and The Karate Kid crossover film in 2012, to be directed by John G. Avildsen which would follow Daniel LaRusso's daughter and Milo Ventimiglia's Rocky Balboa Jr. "get[ting] together and open[ing] a dojo". Describing the concept as "awful", Macchio declined reprising his role and the project subsequently entered development hell, before being abandoned in favor of Creed and Cobra Kai individually.

== See also ==
- List of boxing films
