= Rocky V: Music from and Inspired by the Motion Picture =

Rocky V (Music from and Inspired by the Motion Picture)

Soundtrack album by Various Artists
- Released: November 12, 1990
- Genres: Rock, house, hip hop, new jack swing
- Length: 45:19
- Label: Capitol

Professional ratings
Review scores
Source	Rating
Allmusic	2/5 stars

Rocky V (Music from and Inspired by the Motion Picture) is the soundtrack album to the 1990 film Rocky V.

== Overview ==
The album is a complete departure from the previous soundtracks in the Rocky film series because it doesn't consist mainly of classic Bill Conti songs or rock music, but is instead dominated by hip hop and new jack swing music. Although the classic Conti songs "Conquest", "Mickey", and "Gonna Fly Now" are used in the film, they are not featured on the soundtrack. In the trailer for the movie, there were songs by Vince DiCola from Rocky IV (1985) including "Training Montage" and "War" that were not present for the film nor the soundtrack. The only Bill Conti song on the soundtrack, "Can't Stop the Fire", is not used in the film but was later used on the album Rocky Balboa: The Best of Rocky, which was released to coincide with the release of Rocky Balboa in 2006. Only five of the eleven tracks on the soundtrack are used in the film: the film's theme, "Go for It (Heart and Fire)" by Joey B. Ellis, "Take You Back (Home Sweet Home)" by 7A3, "Keep It Up" by Snap!, "All You Gotta Do is Sing" by Joey B. Ellis and "The Measure of a Man" by Elton John.

== Track listing ==
No.	Title	Writer(s)	Performer	Length
1.	"That's What I Said"	MC Hammer	MC Hammer	4:24
2.	"All You Gotta Do Is Sing"	Joey B. Ellis	Joey B. Ellis	3:57
3.	"No Competition"	William Hamilton & MC Tab	MC Tab	3:52
4.	"Go For It! (Heart and Fire)"	Joey B. Ellis, Tynetta Hare, Michael Kelly & James Earley	Joey B. Ellis & Tynetta Hare	4:14
5.	"Take You Back (Home Sweet Home)"	Frank Stallone, Bobby Simmons, Brett Bouldin & Sean Bouldin	The 7A3	4:10
6.	"The Measure of a Man"	Alan Menken, Elton John & Tim Rice	Elton John	4:03
7.	"Can't Stop the Fire"	Bill Conti & Ashley Irwin	Bill Conti	3:19
8.	"I Wanna Rock"	Robert Ginyard (aka Rob Base)	Rob Base	3:02
9.	"Thought U Were the One For Me"	Joey B. Ellis	Joey B. Ellis	4:20
10.	"Keep It Up"	Benito Benites, John Garrett III & Durron Butler	Snap!	4:03
11.	"Feel My Power"	MC Hammer	MC Hammer	5:11

== Chart positions ==
Chart (1991)	Peak position
Australia (ARIA Charts)	67
Austrian Albums (Ö3 Austria)	12
Dutch Albums (Album Top 100)	41
German Albums (Offizielle Top 100)	12
Swedish Albums (Sverigetopplistan)	36
Swiss Albums (Schweizer Hitparade)	11
Chart (2001)	Peak position
UK Soundtrack Albums (Official Charts)	38
