= Rocky III: Original Motion Picture Score =

Soundtrack album by Bill Conti
- Released: June 14, 1982
- Genre: Pop rock
- Length: 32:00
- Label: Liberty

Singles from Rocky III
- 1. "Eye of the Tiger" Released: May 1982

Professional ratings
Review scores
Source	Rating
AllMusic	1.5/5 stars

Rocky III: Original Motion Picture Score is a soundtrack album for the 1982 American film Rocky III, composed by Bill Conti. It is the final Rocky soundtrack composed by Conti, having composed the previous two films. A soundtrack album containing Conti's score was released on June 14, 1982. This album features the hit single, "Eye of the Tiger", which has become synonymous with the Rocky franchise.

== Track listing ==
1. "Eye of the Tiger" (by Survivor) – 3:53 (Note: Slightly slower than the original on the CD - the single version - 3:45)
2. "Take You Back (Tough Gym)" – 1:48
3. "Pushin'" – 3:10
4. "Decision" – 3:20
5. "Mickey" – 4:42
6. "Take You Back" – 3:37
7. "Reflections" – 2:05
8. "Gonna Fly Now" – 2:52
9. "Adrian" – 1:42
10. "Conquest" – 4:40

Personnel

- Frank Stallone – vocals (2, 3, 6)
- DeEtta Little, Nelson Pigford – vocals (8)
- Mike Lang – piano (5)
- Ray Pizzi – saxophone (3)
- Jerry Hey – trumpet (3)
- Vincent DeRosa – French horn (5)
- Henry Sigismonti – brass
- Rich Perissi – brass
- Arthur Maebe – brass
- Dave Duke – brass
- Paul Neuffer – brass

The version of "Eye of the Tiger" that appears in the film is actually a demonstration recording; the "finished" version is what appears on the soundtrack. Also missing from the soundtrack is the instrumental version of the song played when Rocky is training in Apollo's old gym.

A re-release of Rocky III: Original Motion Picture Score CD was released on July 23, 1996.

== Charts ==
Chart (1982)	Peak position
Australia (Kent Music Report)	13
Canada Top Albums/CDs (RPM)	27
German Albums (Offizielle Top 100)	36
Norwegian Albums (VG-lista)	5
Swedish Albums (Sverigetopplistan)	9
UK Albums (Official Charts)	42
US Billboard 200	15

== Certifications ==
Region	Certification	Certified units/sales
Canada (Music Canada)	Gold	50,000^{^}
United States (RIAA)	Gold	500,000^{^}
^{^} Shipments figures based on certification alone.
