= Creed (soundtrack) =

2015 album by various artists

Creed: Original Motion Picture Soundtrack

Soundtrack album by Various artists
- Released: November 20, 2015
- Genres: Hip hop; R&B; film score
- Length: 69:38
- Label: Atlantic
- Producers: Kevin Weaver; Gabe Hilfer; Ludwig Göransson

Singles from Creed
- 1. "Check" Released: June 1, 2015

Creed: Original Motion Picture Soundtrack is a soundtrack album for the 2015 film Creed, which features music by various artists. The album was released on November 20, 2015, through Atlantic Records.

== Overview ==
In March 2015, it was announced that composer Ludwig Göransson would score Creed, marking the second feature-length film collaboration between Göransson and director Ryan Coogler after Fruitvale Station (2013). Influenced by 1970s culture and the musical legacy of the Rocky film series, Coogler noted that "the music was a big focal point" for the film, stating, "'Eye of the Tiger', 'No Easy Way Out', all those songs were a massive hit. And we embraced that. We recorded original songs for the movie." Göransson brought in an array of artists to modernize the orchestral aspects of the soundtrack. "The first name that came to mind was obviously Meek Mill, because we needed a voice from Philly," said Göransson. "For me that was an obvious choice for the big training montage. It's all full orchestral, and it has some dark 808s under it. In the middle there are all these dirt bikes coming out, and there's a 45-second rap verse that Meek Mill is doing over that." Other musicians that recorded with Göransson specifically for the film include Donald Glover, Future, Vince Staples, and Jhené Aiko.

A music video for Mill's "Lord Knows" was created as a companion to the film. Released on November 20, 2015, the Spike Jordan-directed video features footage from the film edited together with footage of Mill and Tory Lanez performing the song. Both of Mill's respective tracks that appear on the film's soundtrack, the former, along with "Check", were originally listed on his sophomore album, Dreams Worth More Than Money, released earlier that year.

Actress Tessa Thompson, who portrays singer/songwriter Bianca in the film, was involved early with the film's preparation in order to write music for her character with Göransson. "We spent two weeks in Los Angeles in a studio basically writing from morning until night," said Thompson. "It was cool and also gave me insight on [Bianca's] musical abilities, which is something I dabbled in." Three tracks featuring Thompson are included in the film: "Grip", "Breathe", and "Shed You".

== Track listing ==
No.	Title	Writer(s)	Producer(s)	Length
1.	"Last Breath" (Future)	Leland Wayne; Nayvadius Wilburn; William Conti; Ludwig Göransson	Metro Boomin; Ludwig Göransson	3:59
2.	"Check" (Meek Mill)	Wayne; Joshua Luellen; Robert Williams	Metro Boomin; Southside	3:15
3.	"Intolerant" (White Dave)	Noah Coogler		3:35
4.	"The Fire" (The Roots featuring John Legend)	Tarik Trotter; Richard Friederich; Ahmir Thompson; Karl Jenkins	A. Thompson; Jenkins; Nichols; Friedrich	3:42
5.	"Grip" (Tessa Thompson)	Sam Dew; Göransson; Tessa Thompson	Göransson	1:56
6.	"Lord Knows" (Meek Mill featuring Tory Lanez)	Williams; Daniel Gonzalez; Daystar Peterson	Play Picasso	5:20
7.	"Don't Waste My Time" (Krept & Konan)	Karl Wilson; Fateh Rahman; Casyo Johnson	ADotSkitz	3:26
8.	"Let You Know" (White Dave featuring Clif Soulo and Legendvry)	N. Coogler; Antonio Davis; Clifton Harrison		4:33
9.	"Breathe" (Tessa Thompson)	T. Thompson; Donald Glover; Göransson	Göransson	2:25
10.	"Wake Up Everybody" (Harold Melvin & the Blue Notes)	Gene McFadden; John Whitehead; Victor Carstarphen	Kenneth Gamble; Leon Huff	3:40
11.	"Bridging the Gap" (Nas featuring Olu Dara)	Nasir Jones; Olu Dara; Salaam Gibbs	Salaam Remi	4:01
12.	"Waiting For My Moment" (Childish Gambino, Jhené Aiko, Vince Staples and Ludwig Göransson)	Göransson; Glover; Vincent Staples; Ryan Coogler	Göransson	4:11
13.	"Hail Mary" (Makaveli featuring The Outlawz and Prince Ital Joe)	Tupac Shakur; Rufus Cooper; Katari Cox; Yafeu Fula; Joseph Paquette; Tyrone Wrice; Bruce Washington	Hurt-M-Badd	5:11
14.	"In the Kitchen" (White Dave featuring Young T and K.E.L.L.S.)	N. Coogler; Ra'chard Tucker; Ian Kelly		5:22
15.	"Shed You" (Tessa Thompson and Moses Sumney)	T. Thompson; Göransson; Moses Sumney	Göransson	3:19
16.	"Curry Chicken" (Joey Bada$$)	Patrick Baril; Jo-Vaughn Virginie; Anthony Reid	Statik Selektah	3:34
17.	"Work Ya Muscle" (Eearz)	Gerron Herring; Christopher Lee; Michael Williams II; Samuel Gloade	30 Roc; Mike Will Made It	3:15
18.	"Lord Knows / Fighting Stronger" (Meek Mill, Jhené Aiko and Ludwig Göransson)	Williams; R. Coogler; Göransson; Peterson; Gonzalez	Göransson; Play Picasso	4:54

== Chart positions ==
Chart (2015)	Peak position
Italian Compilation Albums (FIMI)	30
US Billboard 200	101
US Top Soundtracks (Billboard)	7

== Score album ==
Creed: Original Motion Picture Score

Soundtrack album by Ludwig Göransson
- Released: November 20, 2015
- Recorded: August 29–31, 2015; Eastwood Scoring Stage, Burbank, California
- Genres: Film score, hip hop
- Length: 59:27
- Label: WaterTower Music
- Producer: Ludwig Göransson

Ludwig Göransson chronology
A Merry Friggin' Christmas (2014)	Creed: Original Motion Picture Score (2015)	Central Intelligence (2016)

Creed: Original Motion Picture Score is a soundtrack album for the 2015 film Creed, composed by Ludwig Göransson. It was released on November 20, 2015, through WaterTower Music. The score was recorded with a 100-piece orchestra and a 24-piece choir at Warner Bros. Studios.

No.	Title	Length
1.	"Juvy"	2:19
2.	"Adonis"	2:27
3.	"Meeting Rocky"	4:02
4.	"Conlan (Redemption)"	1:28
5.	"Grip (Interlude)"	2:05
6.	"First Date†"	2:30
7.	"Moving in with Rocky"	1:20
8.	"Breathe (Interlude)"	2:27
9.	"Front Street Gym"	3:21
10.	"The Sporino Fight"	4:34
11.	"Shed You (Interlude)"	2:40
12.	"I Got You"	1:02
13.	"Rocky Is Sick"	2:17
14.	"Caught in the Shadow"	1:20
15.	"If I Fight, You Fight (Training Montage)"	4:54
16.	"Boxing Shorts"	1:43
17.	"Conlan Fight"	6:37
18.	"You're a Creed†"	4:26
19.	"You Can See the Whole Town from Here†"	2:11
20.	"End Credits – Creed"	3:08
21.	"Creed Suite"	2:36

† - Contains interpolations of "Going The Distance" and "Gonna Fly Now (Theme from Rocky)" from the original Rocky film.

=== Personnel ===
Production

- Ludwig Göransson – composer, producer
- Bill Conti – original material
- Jasper Randall – choir conductor / choir contractor

Technical

- Joe Shirley – technical score engineer
- Ronald J. Webb – music editor
- Chris Fogel – music scoring mixer
- John W. Chapman – score mix assistant

Orchestration

- Pete Anthony – conductor
- Erik Arvinder – orchestrator
- Jeff Atmajian – orchestrator
- Luke Flynn – music preparation
- Mark Graham – head of music preparation
- Tom Hardisty – music scoring recordist
- Gabe Hilfer – music supervisor
- Riley Hughes – music preparation
- Jacob Nathan – music coordinator
- Victor Pesavento – music preparation
- Peter Rotter – orchestra contractor
- Henri Wilkinson – orchestrator
- Joe Zimmerman – music preparation

== Additional music ==
Additional music credited in Creed:

Title	Musician(s)	Key scenes/Notes
"El Padre Armando"	Macias & Macias	Plays during Donnie Creed's boxing bout in Tijuana, Mexico.
"24/7 Boxing Theme"	José Cancela, Amy Beauchamp	Plays during the HBO 24/7 documentary on Ricky Conlan and Danny Wheeler.
"Be Alright"	Tessa Thompson, Ludwig Göransson, DJ Dahi	Plays during the scene in the beginning of the movie where Donnie goes downstairs to tell his neighbor to turn down their music and is surprised to meet Bianca.
"Days Undone"	The Jay Vons	
"Gray"	Gedeon Luke and The People	
"Commas"	Future	
"Pardon the Interruption Theme"	Joel Langley	Plays during the Pardon the Interruption segment regarding the Creed–Conlan match.
"Throw Caution To The Wind"	Ronnie Gesser	
"E Cosi' Per Non Morire"	Luciano Beretta, Elide Suligoj	
"Gonna Fly Now (Theme from Rocky)"	Bill Conti, Carol Connors, Ayn Robbins	Plays between the eleventh and twelfth rounds of the final match.
"Going the Distance"	Bill Conti	Plays during the twelfth round of the final match.
