= Rocky Balboa: The Best of Rocky =

Soundtrack album by Various Artists
- Released: December 26, 2006
- Length: 60:06
- Label: Capitol

Professional ratings
Review scores
| Source | Rating |
|---|---|
| AllMusic | 4/5 stars |

Rocky Balboa: The Best of Rocky is a compilation album of music and short dialogue clips from all six Rocky films, named after the sixth installment, Rocky Balboa. It was released on December 26, 2006 by Capitol Records, the same day as the 30th anniversary re-release of the original Rocky soundtrack.

== Overview ==
Whether the 2006 film Rocky Balboa has an official soundtrack album is subject to some debate. On December 26, 2006, Capitol Records released Rocky Balboa: The Best of Rocky which contains a logo and cover art that is identical to the film's theatrical poster. Notable though is that only three of the album's nineteen total tracks are from the Rocky Balboa film: Two dialogue tracks and the Three 6 Mafia song "It's a Fight" (the UK version contains the additional track "Still Here" by Natasha Bedingfield). This has led some to categorize the CD as a compilation while others suggest that it is a soundtrack and that the use of past material simply reflects the film's extensive use of flashbacks.

Relevant to this debate is the absence of any compositions by Rocky IV composer Vince DiCola, except for the song "Heart's on Fire", co-written by DiCola, Ed Fruge and Joe Esposito. DiCola is the only person other than Bill Conti to act as composer on a Rocky film and his work was used extensively on the 1991 compilation CD The Rocky Story: Songs from the Rocky Movies. The missing DiCola tracks are the only tracks on the 1991 CD that are not present on the new CD which indicates an effort to use only Rocky Balboa composer Conti's tracks.

== Track listing ==
All tracks by Bill Conti unless otherwise noted.

1. "Gonna Fly Now" (Theme from Rocky) – 2:48
2. "Eye of the Tiger" by Survivor – 3:53
3. "Going the Distance" – 2:40
4. "Living in America" by James Brown – 4:45
5. "Redemption" (Theme from Rocky II) – 2:41
6. "Fanfare for Rocky" – 2:34
7. "Burning Heart" by Survivor – 3:52
8. "Conquest" – 4:43
9. "Adrian" – 1:39
10. "No Easy Way Out" by Robert Tepper – 4:23
11. "Rocky's Reward" – 2:05
12. "Alone in the Ring" – 1:10
13. "Heart's on Fire" by John Cafferty – 4:13
14. "Can't Stop the Fire" – 3:20
15. "Mickey" – 4:38
16. "Overture" – 8:42
17. "It's a Fight" by Three 6 Mafia – 3:07
18. "Gonna Fly Now" (John X Remix) – 3:07

== Chart positions ==
| Chart (2007) | Peak position |
|---|---|
| Austrian Albums (Ö3 Austria) | 13 |
| Swiss Albums (Schweizer Hitparade) | 48 |
| US Billboard 200 | 87 |
| US Top Soundtracks (Billboard) | 7 |
