= Rocky Balboa (video game) =

2007 video game

- PAL cover art
- Developer: Ubisoft Montreal
- Publisher: Ubisoft
- Designer: David Anfossi
- Platform: PlayStation Portable
- Release: 2007
- Genres: Boxing, fighting
- Modes: Single-player, multiplayer

Rocky Balboa is a 2007 video game based on the movie of the same name for the PlayStation Portable, which is similar in style and content to Rocky Legends. The game includes footage from each Rocky film, showing the buildup to the major fights of the film series. There are also some flashback videos of the training footage from the films (this is used in the Mickey's Corner section of the game, which is a tutorial aimed to teach new players how to play). It is also the last video game released by MGM Interactive before the company became defunct in late 2007.

== Gameplay ==
The game contains a variety of different modes. Historical Fights is the main game mode, which pits Rocky against all of his various opponents throughout the franchise, from Spider Rico (Rocky) to Mason Dixon (Rocky Balboa). Once Rocky has beaten all of his opponents, the story mode then flips so that the first fight becomes "Spider Rico VS Rocky" and the last fight becomes "Mason Dixon VS Rocky Balboa".

There are 27 different boxer selections possible. There are separate versions of Rocky which vary in age, weight (depending on the film) and clothes (black/gold, white/red variations). There are alternative versions of Apollo Creed and Tommy Gunn has two different selectable outfits. The player can choose from 18 different arenas to fight in, including many of the film franchise's major boxing arenas, such as the Philadelphia arena and Las Vegas.

Fast Lane is designed for quick-play, where a player picks a challenge and then tries to complete it by knocking out the other fighter in the time available. The different time limits are; 1 minute, 2 minutes, 3 minutes, 5 minutes and 10 minutes. Each section has 18 matches, making for a total of 90 matches. At the start of the game, only 10% of these are available. Each extra match is unlocked in sequential order, so completing "Facing Clubber 1" will unlock "Facing Clubber 2". This game supports local ad hoc multiplayer and has an auto-save feature.

Unlike a number of previous Rocky games, the player cannot participate in any interactive training sessions to build up their character's power.

== Reception ==
=== Critical response ===
Reception

Aggregate scores
Aggregator	Score
GameRankings	57.75%
Metacritic	58/100

Review scores
Publication	Score
Edge	5/10
Eurogamer	6/10
GameSpot	6.1/10
GamesTM	5/10
IGN	4.7/10
PlayStation Official Magazine – UK	6/10
PALGN	6/10
Play	68%
PSM3	66%
VideoGamer.com	6/10

The game was met with a mixed reception, as GameRankings gave it a score of 57.75%, while Metacritic gave it 58 out of 100.
