= Rocky IV =

1985 film by Sylvester Stallone

- Theatrical release poster
- Directed by: Sylvester Stallone
- Written by: Sylvester Stallone
- Based on: Characters by Sylvester Stallone
- Produced by: Irwin Winkler; Robert Chartoff
- Starring: Sylvester Stallone; Talia Shire; Burt Young; Carl Weathers; Brigitte Nielsen; Dolph Lundgren
- Cinematography: Bill Butler
- Edited by: Don Zimmerman; John W. Wheeler
- Music by: Vince DiCola
- Production companies: United Artists; Chartoff-Winkler Productions
- Distributed by: MGM/UA Entertainment Co.
- Release dates: November 21, 1985 (Premiere); November 27, 1985 (United States)
- Running time: 91 minutes (theatrical cut); 93 minutes (director's cut)
- Country: United States
- Language: English
- Budget: $28 million
- Box office: $300.5 million

Rocky IV is a 1985 American sports drama film starring, written and directed by Sylvester Stallone. The film is the sequel to Rocky III (1982) and the fourth installment in the Rocky franchise. It also stars Talia Shire, Burt Young, Carl Weathers, Brigitte Nielsen, and Dolph Lundgren. In the film, Rocky Balboa (Stallone) confronts Ivan Drago (Lundgren), a Soviet boxer responsible for another personal tragedy in Balboa's life.

Development for a fourth Rocky film began soon after the success of Rocky III. Principal photography began in 1984, with filming locations including Philadelphia, Wyoming, and Vancouver. Rocky IV was Lundgren's American film debut, and Stallone's last directorial effort until Rocky Balboa in 2006; they engaged in authentic punching in their fight scenes, which led to Stallone being admitted to intensive care. Filming also featured new special effects and bona fide, groundbreaking sport methods and equipment, some of which were years removed from public use. Rocky IV is known for its strong Cold War themes, as well as its successful theme songs "Burning Heart" by Survivor and "Living in America" by James Brown. It is also the first installment in the series not to be composed by Bill Conti, who composed the first three films. Vince DiCola served as the composer to this film instead.

Rocky IV premiered in Los Angeles on November 21, 1985, and was theatrically released in the United States by MGM/UA Entertainment Co. under its United Artists label on November 27. The film initially was panned by critics, with praise for Drago's credibility as a villain, but criticized the predictable screenplay. Scholars note that Drago's ultimate defeat and the Soviet crowd's embrace of Rocky represented the dissolution of the Soviet Union, while others criticized the film as propaganda through its Cold War themes and negative portrayals of Russians.

Rocky IV grossed $300.5 million worldwide, becoming the highest-grossing Rocky film, the third-highest-grossing US film of 1985 and the second-highest-grossing film worldwide. Later reviews were more favorable, with praise for the training montages. The film is considered an icon of 1980s pop culture, and gained a cult following. In 2021, a director's cut was released with the title Rocky IV: Rocky vs Drago – The Ultimate Director's Cut, receiving positive reviews. A sequel, Rocky V, was released in 1990 and was directed by John G. Avildsen, after directing the original film, with Conti returning as the composer. The film's storylines are continued in Creed II (2018), part of the sequel series to the Rocky films.

== Plot ==
In 1985, Russian boxer and Soviet Army Captain Ivan Drago arrives in the United States from the Soviet Union with his wife Ludmilla, his trainers and his manager, Nicolai Koloff. Koloff takes every opportunity to promote Drago's athleticism as a hallmark of Soviet superiority. Motivated by patriotism and a desire to step back in the ring, former heavyweight champion Apollo Creed challenges Drago to an exhibition fight. Rocky Balboa has reservations about his much larger opponent and about Apollo coming out of retirement but agrees to help train Apollo for the match.

The boxing exhibition takes place at the MGM Grand Hotel in Las Vegas. Apollo enters the ring in an over-the-top patriotic entrance with James Brown performing "Living in America", complete with showgirls. The bout starts tamely with Apollo landing several punches that are ineffective against Drago, but Drago suddenly retaliates with devastating effects. By the end of the first round, Rocky and Apollo's trainer, Duke Evers, plead with him to stop the match, but Apollo refuses to do so. Drago aggressively pummels him in the second round. Apollo falls after a particularly savage blow and lies twitching on the ground. After the match is called in Drago's favor, he displays no contrition, commenting to the assembled media: "If he dies, he dies." Apollo dies as a result of his injuries.

Rocky decides to challenge Drago himself, but has to surrender his championship to do so. Drago's camp agrees to an unsanctioned 15-round fight in Moscow on Christmas Day, an arrangement meant to protect Drago from the threats of violence he has been receiving in the United States. Rocky travels to the Soviet Union without his wife Adrian due to her disapproval of the match, setting up his training base in a remote cabin in Siberia with only Duke and Paulie to accompany him while being constantly watched by KGB Agents. Duke opens up to Rocky, stating that he actually raised Apollo and that his death felt like a father losing his son, and expresses his faith in Rocky that he will emerge victorious. To prepare for the match, Drago uses high-tech equipment, a team of trainers and doctors monitoring his every movement, and regular doses of anabolic steroids. Rocky, on the other hand, does roadwork in deep snow over mountainous terrain and workouts utilizing antiquated farm equipment. Adrian arrives unexpectedly five days before the fight to give Rocky her support.

On the night of the match, Rocky enters to a hostile jeering crowd. Drago is introduced with cheers and an elaborate patriotic ceremony, with the Soviet General Secretary and Politburo in attendance. In contrast to his match with Apollo, Drago immediately goes on the offensive. Rocky takes a pounding in the first round, but toward the end of the second round he lands a right hook that cuts Drago's left eye. Between rounds, Duke encourages Rocky by telling him he's proven Drago is only human, and Drago comments to his trainers that Rocky "is like a piece of iron."

The two boxers spend the next dozen rounds trading blows, with Rocky managing to hold his ground despite Drago's best efforts. As the 12th round begins, the Russian crowd starts to cheer for Rocky. After Koloff berates Drago for not finishing the fight and seeing the crowd turn on him, Drago rebels, throwing him from the ring and directly addressing the Soviet leadership, stating he fights only for himself. In the final round, with both fighters exhausted, Rocky unleashes a series of blows that KOs Drago, avenging Apollo's death.

Rocky gives a victory speech, acknowledging the crowd's initial disdain of him, but points out that it changed to respect during the fight. He compares it to the wider disdain between Russians and Americans, except that he and the crowd have come to respect and admire each other during the course of the fight. Rocky adds that the crowd has seen "two guys killin' each other, but I guess that's better than 20 million". Rocky finally declares, "If I can change, and you can change, then everybody can change!" The General Secretary stands and passionately applauds Rocky, and his aides follow suit. Rocky ends his speech by wishing his son Rocky Jr. a Merry Christmas, and throws his arms into the air in victory as the crowd applauds.

== Cast ==
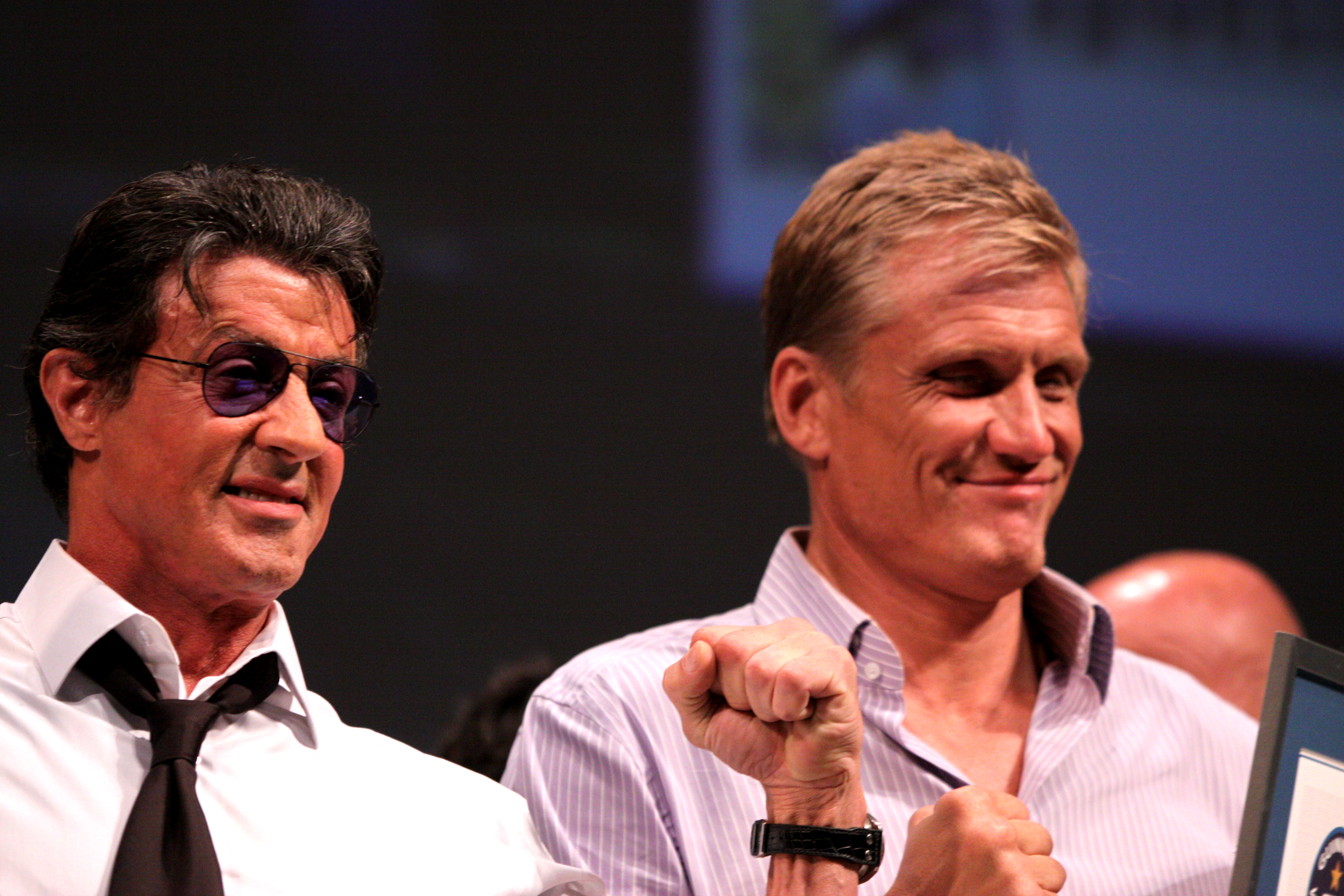
Lead actors Sylvester Stallone and Dolph Lundgren

- Sylvester Stallone as Robert "Rocky" Balboa, "The Italian Stallion": The reigning two-time Heavyweight Champion of the World.
- Talia Shire as Adrian Pennino Balboa: Rocky's wife and support through his boxing career.
- Burt Young as Paulie Pennino: Rocky's friend and brother-in-law.
- Carl Weathers as Apollo Creed: Former Heavyweight Champion of the World, and close friend to Rocky.
- Brigitte Nielsen as Ludmilla Vobet Drago: Wife and supporter of Ivan Drago, and Olympic swimming champion. In real life, Nielsen was engaged to Stallone during the production, and married shortly after the release. They appeared together once again in 1986's Cobra, before they divorced in 1987. She later reprised the role in Creed II (2018).
- Dolph Lundgren as Captain Ivan Drago: the Soviets' prize Champion boxer "The Siberian Express" and a Soviet Army infantry captain. Lundgren would also return in Creed II.
- Tony Burton as Tony "Duke" Evers: Apollo's father-figure, friend, trainer and manager, who becomes Rocky's trainer for his match against Drago.
- Michael Pataki as Nicolai Koloff: Trainer, promoter, and manager of Ivan Drago.
- Rocky Krakoff as Rocky Balboa Jr.
- David Lloyd Austin as Mikhail Gorbachev
- Sylvia Meals as Mary Anne Creed: Wife of Apollo
- George Rogan as Sergei Rimsky: Another Ivan Drago trainer.

LeRoy Neiman plays the ring announcer in the Creed-Drago match. Burgess Meredith and Mr. T appear as Mickey Goldmill and Clubber Lang, respectively, in archive footage. Appearing as themselves are singer James Brown and commentators Stu Nahan, Warner Wolf, R. J. Adams, Barry Tompkins and Al Bandiero.

== Production ==
=== Casting ===
Sportscaster Stu Nahan makes his fourth appearance in the Rocky series as commentator for the Apollo Creed (Carl Weathers)–Ivan Drago (Dolph Lundgren) fight. Warner Wolf replaces Bill Baldwin, who died following filming for Rocky III, as co-commentator. For the fight between Rocky Balboa (Sylvester Stallone) and Drago, commentators Barry Tompkins and Al Bandiero portray themselves as USA Network broadcasters.

Apollo Creed's wife Mary Anne (Sylvia Meals) made her third appearance in the series, the first being Rocky (portrayed by Lavelle Roby), although the character was mainly featured in Rocky II. Stallone's future wife, Brigitte Nielsen, appeared as Drago's wife, Ludmilla Vobet Drago.

The Soviet premier in the sky box during the Rocky–Drago match, played by David Lloyd Austin, strongly resembles contemporary (and last) Soviet leader Mikhail Gorbachev. Austin later played Gorbachev in The Naked Gun, and Russian characters in other films.

=== Filming ===
Wyoming doubled for the frozen expanse of Russia. The small farm where Rocky lived and trained was in Jackson Hole, and Grand Teton National Park was used for filming many of the outdoor sequences in the Soviet Union. The PNE Agrodome at Hastings Park in Vancouver, British Columbia served as the location of Rocky's Moscow bout.

Sylvester Stallone has stated that the original punching scenes filmed between him and Dolph Lundgren in the first portion of the fight are completely authentic. Stallone wanted to capture a realistic scene and Lundgren agreed that they would engage in legitimate sparring. One particularly forceful punch to Stallone's chest slammed his heart against his breastbone, causing the heart to swell. Stallone, suffering from labored breathing and a blood pressure over 200, was flown from the set in Vancouver, British Columbia to Saint John's Regional Medical Center in Santa Monica, California and was forced into intensive care for eight days. Stallone later commented that he believed Lundgren had the athletic ability and talent to fight in the professional heavyweight division of boxing. Producer Irwin Winkler describes the exact same event in his autobiography, observing not Lundgren, rather, "Sly took a punch from a stand-in fighter and ended up in the emergency room with his blood pressure dangerously high."

Additionally, Stallone has stated that Lundgren nearly forced Carl Weathers to quit during the filming of the Apollo vs. Drago exhibition fight. At one point in the filming of the scene, Lundgren tossed Weathers into the corner of the boxing ring. Weathers shouted profanities at Lundgren while leaving the ring and announced that he was calling his agent and quitting the movie. Only after Stallone forced the two actors to reconcile did filming continue. The event caused a four-day work stoppage, while Weathers was talked back into the part and Lundgren agreed to tone down his aggressiveness.

=== Post-production ===
Rocky IV is one of the few sport movies that applies genuine sound effects from actual punches, bona fide training methods created by boxing consultants, and a bevy of other new special effects. The film is recognized as being ahead of its time in its demonstration of groundbreaking high-tech sporting equipment, some of which was experimental and 20 years from public use. In 2012, Olympians Michael Phelps and Ryan Lochte noted that the training sequences in Rocky IV inspired them to use a cabin similar to what the resourceful Balboa utilized in the film.

Paulie Pennino (Burt Young)'s robot, a character that through the years has enjoyed a cult following of its own, was created by International Robotics Inc. in New York City. The robot's initial voice was that of the company's CEO, Robert Doornick. The robot is identified by its engineers as "SICO" and is/was a member of the Screen Actors Guild. It toured with James Brown in the 1980s. The robot was written into the movie after it had been used to help treat Stallone's autistic son, Seargeoh.

== Music ==
=== Soundtrack ===
The musical score for Rocky IV was composed by Vince DiCola, who would later compose the music for The Transformers: The Movie. Rocky IV is the only film in the series prior to Creed not to feature original music by Bill Conti; however, it does feature arrangements of themes composed by Conti from previous films in the series, such as "The Final Bell". Conti, who was too busy with the first two Karate Kid films at the time, would return for Rocky V and Rocky Balboa. Conti's famous piece of music from the Rocky series, "Gonna Fly Now", does not appear at all in Rocky IV (the first time in the series this happened), though a few bars of it are incorporated into DiCola's training montage instrumental.

Songs from the movie include "Living in America" by James Brown, as well as music by John Cafferty ("Heart's on Fire", featuring Vince DiCola), Survivor ("Burning Heart"), Kenny Loggins, and Robert Tepper. Four of these songs became U.S. chart hits, two of which reached the top five of the Billboard Hot 100. Go West wrote "One Way Street" for the movie by request of Sylvester Stallone. Europe's hit "The Final Countdown", written earlier in the decade by lead singer Joey Tempest, is often incorrectly stated as being featured in the film due to its similarity to DiCola's "Training Montage." However, Europe's track was not released as a single until late 1986, after Rocky IV's release.

According to singer Peter Cetera, he originally wrote his best-selling solo single "Glory of Love" as the end title for this film, but was passed over by United Artists, and was instead subsequently used as the theme for The Karate Kid Part II.

== Release ==
=== Theatrical ===
Rocky IV premiered in Westwood, Los Angeles on November 21, 1985. It opened Wednesday, November 27 on 1,325 screens in the United States and Canada prior to the Thanksgiving holiday.

=== Lawsuit ===
The script development was the subject of a famous copyright lawsuit, Anderson v. Stallone. Timothy Anderson developed a treatment for Rocky IV on spec; after the studio decided not to buy his treatment, he sued when the resulting movie script was similar to his treatment. The court held that Anderson had prepared an unauthorized derivative work of the characters Stallone had developed in Rocky I through III, and thus no part of his infringing work was eligible for copyright restriction.

=== The Ultimate Director's Cut ===
In August 2020, Stallone announced that a director's cut edition of the film would be released to commemorate the film's 35th anniversary. Approximately 38 minutes of previously unreleased footage consisting of both new scenes and alternate takes was added to the film, including significant extensions of both fight scenes and the Apollo Creed funeral scene, in addition to a lengthier recap of Rocky III at the beginning of the film. A significant amount of original footage was removed or replaced to make way for these additions, as the director's cut runs 93 minutes compared to the original cut's 91 minutes.

One major cut was that of the scenes featuring Paulie's robot. "The robot is going to the junkyard forever, no more robot," Stallone commented. Robert Doornick, founder of International Robotics and the voice of the robot, commented that Stallone cut all of the robot scenes in the director's cut to save money on royalty fees that were given to Doornick in the original cut. Scenes with Brigitte Nielsen playing Ludmilla, Ivan Drago's wife, were also substantially diminished, particularly the scenes where she spoke for her husband at press conferences and her encounter with Mary Anne Creed in Las Vegas just before the tragic fight between Creed and Drago.

Other scenes from the 1985 version removed in the new cut include Rocky celebrating his wedding anniversary with Adrian Pennino Balboa (Talia Shire) and the Soviet regime leaders "Mikhail Gorbachev" applauding Rocky for his speech after winning the final fight, with them instead leaving the room, as well as the scene which Rocky says "Merry Christmas" at the end of the speech was diminished. The director's cut also features the addition of some of Bill Conti's musical themes from the previous films onto the soundtrack, and the toning down of sound effects, particularly the exaggerated punching sounds heard in the original cut. The new cut is also presented in an aspect ratio of 2.39:1 compared to the original's 1.85:1.

The director's cut, titled Rocky IV: Rocky vs. Drago – The Ultimate Director's Cut, had a one-night theatrical release on November 11, 2021, and was released in digital formats the following day. Unlike the original cut, the director's cut was distributed through United Artists Releasing. A "making of" video was released on YouTube a week prior to the director's cut release.

It was also re-released theatrically by Fathom Entertainment on November 5 and 9, 2025, for its 40th anniversary.

== Reception ==
=== Box office ===
Over the 5-day Thanksgiving weekend, it grossed a non-summer record $31,770,105. In its fourth week of release it expanded to a then-record 2,232 screens. It spent a total of six weeks as the number one film at the US box office, staying on top through the Christmas and New Years period, and grossed a total of $127.8 million in United States and Canada, and $300.5 million worldwide, the most of any Rocky film. It was the highest-grossing sports film of all time, until The Blind Side (2009), which grossed $309 million (without accounting for inflation). It was also the highest-grossing fourth installment of a film in the United States and Canada, surpassing the record of Sudden Impact (1983). Its success led to other studios opening major films over the Thanksgiving holiday.

In the United Kingdom it also had a record opening, grossing £1,780,894 in its first five days.

Stallone has been quoted as saying the enormous financial success and fan-following of Rocky IV once had him envisioning another Rocky movie, devoted to Drago and his post-boxing life, with Balboa's storyline running parallel to Drago's. However, he noted the damage both boxers sustained in the fight made them "incapable of reason", and thus instead planned Rocky V as a showcase of the dangers of boxing.

=== Critical response ===
==== Theatrical cut (1985) ====
Rocky IV has a 37% approval rating on review aggregator Rotten Tomatoes, based on 131 critics. The website's critical consensus states, "Rocky IV inflates the action to absurd heights, but it ultimately rings hollow thanks to a story that hits the same basic beats as the first three entries in the franchise." On Metacritic, the film has a score of 40 out of 100, based on 13 critics, indicating "mixed or average reviews".

Roger Ebert gave the film two out of four stars, stating that with this film the Rocky series began "finally losing its legs. It's been a long run, one hit movie after another, but Rocky IV is a last gasp, a film so predictable that viewing it is like watching one of those old sitcoms where the characters never change and the same situations turn up again and again." Ian Nathan of Empire gave the film two out of five stars, calling the script a "laughable turd" and describing Rocky IV as "the [film] where the Rocky series threw in the towel on the credibility."

Gene Siskel of the Chicago Tribune gave the film a 3.5 out of 4 stars, and stated in his review, "[Stallone] creates credible villains worthy of his heroic character."

==== Director's cut (2021) ====
The new cut, entitled Rocky IV: Rocky vs. Drago, received better reviews from critics, mainly praising the fights (new choreography and sound), more dramatic tone and character development, but still criticizing the plot. On the review aggregator website Rotten Tomatoes, 72% of 18 critics' reviews are positive, with an average rating of 6.9/10.

Jeremy Smith, from Polygon, stated: "The triumph of Stallone’s director’s cut—with a pin-sharp focus on Apollo and Rocky’s relationship and its ruthless removal of anything which distracts—is that it not only nails the central message of the film, but the very point of it existing at all (montages aside)".

In her review for Empire, Terri White praised the clearer motivations in the director's cut: "It's a much more sombre context for the film (and goes some way to recontextualising the first three outings) and serves to subdue its worst indulgences. Without the gills of excess breathing quite so hard, the story of Rocky then pledging to fight Drago in Russia on Christmas Day becomes clear: it's not about solving the Cold War or even a simple revenge yarn wrapped in bombastic patriotism. Rocky needs to find a way to break free of the code. To find a way to change. Apollo couldn't, it says now more explicitly, and he died because of it".

=== Accolades ===
Dolph Lundgren received acclaim for his performance as Ivan Drago. He won the Marshall Trophy for Best Actor at the Napierville Cinema Festival. Rocky IV also won Germany's Golden Screen Award.

The film won five Golden Raspberry Awards, including Worst Actor (Sylvester Stallone, along with Rambo: First Blood Part II), Worst Director (Stallone), Worst Supporting Actress (Brigitte Nielsen), Worst New Star (Nielsen, and also for Red Sonja) and Worst Musical Score (Vince DiCola). It also received nominations for Worst Picture, Worst Supporting Actress (Talia Shire), Worst Supporting Actor (Burt Young) and Worst Screenplay at the 6th Golden Raspberry Awards.

=== Analysis ===
Scholars note that the film's strong yet formulaic structure emphasizes the power of the individual, embodied by Rocky, the prototypically American hero who is inventive, determined, and idealistic. They contrast that with Ivan Drago's hyperbolic characterization as a representation of Soviet power in the context of the latter part of the Cold War. Writer/director Stallone highlights the nationalistic overtones of the Balboa–Drago fight throughout the film, such as when Drago's wife claims the United States is filled with "threats of violence" to her husband. Drago's trainer comments that American society has become "pathetic and weak" and "antagonistic and violent", which has been likened to a common fascist trope depicting an enemy both weak and strong at the same time. Drago represents the totalitarian regime, demonstrating his power when he topples an arrogant opponent (Creed). Later on, the radio announcer says, "Ivan Drago is a man with an entire country in his corner."

=== Reaction in Russia ===
Russia's state-run Russia Beyond published an article in 2021, detailing the trip of a Russian goodwill ambassador Katya Lycheva to America in the 1980s. In the article, it is claimed that she objected to the character Ivan Drago, saying that the film uses him to vilify the Russian people: "In the movie Rocky IV there is not a word of truth about the Soviet Union. We don't even have such faces." Russia Beyond quoted an alleged American journalist saying: "What this film can be blamed for is the constant and shameless pressure on the audience to treat the Russians and their government with contempt, pity and disgust". In 2020, Russia's Maxim magazine ranked the film 8th in the list of "12 most delusional films about Russia", noting that "cinema takes its grudge against the most unpleasant, pre-Gorbachev Soviet realities. […] Soviet sports and party apparatchiks are portrayed in the film with incredible poison and malice".

== Franchise ==
=== Sequel ===
A sequel titled Rocky V, was released in November 16, 1990.

=== Spin-off ===
Sylvester Stallone, Dolph Lundgren, and Brigitte Nielsen reprise their roles from Rocky IV in Creed II, the sequel to the 2015 film Creed. The plot involves Drago's son Viktor (Florian Munteanu) fighting Adonis Creed (Michael B. Jordan) for his title as a way of his father Ivan regaining some of the prestige he lost after his defeat in Rocky IV.

== Other media ==
=== Novelization ===
A novelization was published by Ballantine Books in 1985. Sylvester Stallone was credited as the author. The novel included some backstory for Drago and Ludmilla. Drago was a former coal miner who had come to the government's attention after being featured in a Party promotional film about mining. Ludmilla, born in Kiev to a Party official, had begun training to become a swimming Olympic champion when she was nine.

=== Video games ===
In 1987, Rocky was released, based on the first four Rocky films. 2002 saw the release of Rocky, based on the first five Rocky films. 2004 saw the release of Rocky Legends, also based on the first five Rocky films.

== See also ==
- Blonde versus brunette rivalry
- List of boxing films
- List of Christmas films
