= Rocky (1987 video game) =

- Cover art
- Developer: Sega
- Publisher: Sega
- Platform: Master System
- Release: JP: April 19, 1987; NA: July 1987; EU: August 1987
- Genre: Traditional sports (boxing)
- Modes: Single-player, multiplayer

Rocky is the second video game based on the popular Rocky franchise, developed and published by Sega and released for the Master System in 1987. The player must train Rocky Balboa before each fight to improve his skills. Rocky possesses a straight punch, a hook, an uppercut, and body punch as well as various combos.

== Plot ==
The opponents, in order, are: Apollo Creed, Clubber Lang, and Ivan Drago.

Fights are of 15 rounds duration, with an increasing level of difficulty depending on the opponent, and different strategies required to overcome each.

The game also features a two-player mode where player two can choose from any of the above opponents, while player one always controls Rocky.

== Reception ==
=== Critical response ===
Computer Gaming World in 1988 stated that Rocky had "the most eye-popping graphics".
