= Burt Young =

American actor (1940–2023)

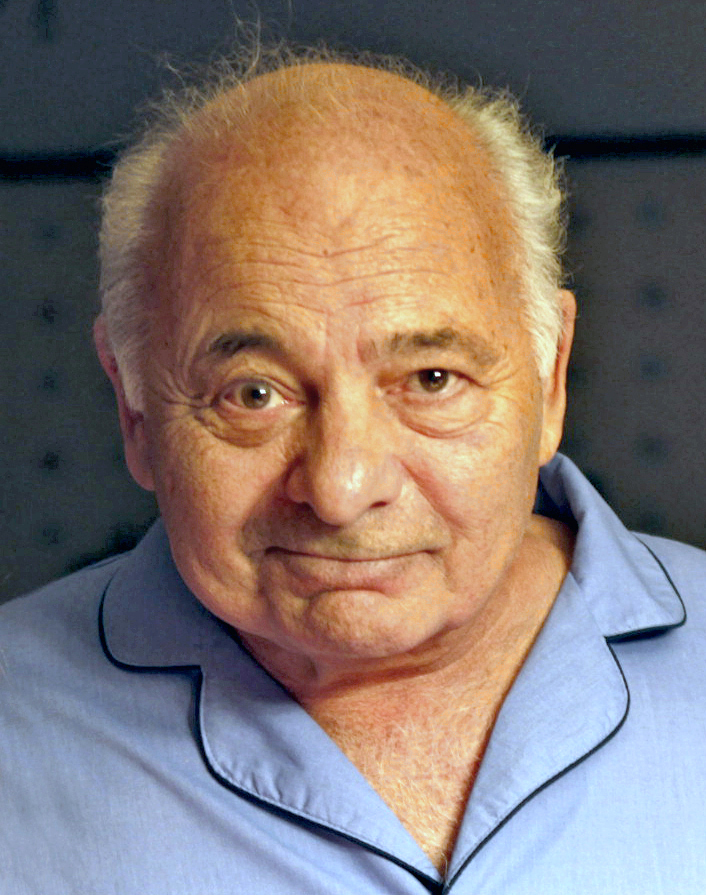
- Young in 2012
- Born: Gerald Tommaso DeLouise; April 30, 1940; New York City, U.S.
- Died: October 8, 2023 (aged 83); Los Angeles, California, U.S.
- Resting place: Mount St. Mary Cemetery; New York City, U.S.
- Occupation: Actor
- Years active: 1969–2023
- Spouse: Gloria DeLouise (m. 1961; died 1974)
- Children: 1
- Military career
- Allegiance: United States
- Branch: United States Marine Corps
- Service years: 1957–1959

Gerald Tommaso DeLouise (April 30, 1940 – October 8, 2023), known professionally as Burt Young, was an American actor. He played Rocky Balboa's brother-in-law and best friend Paulie Pennino in the Rocky film series, his performance in the first installment of which earned him a nomination for the Academy Award for Best Supporting Actor.

Young also appeared in such films as Chinatown (1974), The Gambler (1974), The Killer Elite (1975), Convoy (1978), Uncle Joe Shannon (1978), Once Upon a Time in America (1984), The Pope of Greenwich Village (1984), A Summer to Remember (1985), Back to School (1986), Last Exit to Brooklyn (1990), Mickey Blue Eyes (1999), Transamerica (2005), Win Win (2011), and Bottom of the 9th (2019).

== Early life ==
Young was born on April 30, 1940, in Queens, New York City, and raised in the Queens neighborhood of Corona, the son of Josephine and Michael DeLouise, a high school shop teacher. He was of Italian descent.

Young was trained by Lee Strasberg at the Actors Studio.

== Career ==
=== Military service ===
Young served a tour of duty in the United States Marine Corps from 1957 to 1959; while in the Marine Corps, he boxed regularly, winning 32 of 34 boxing bouts.

=== Acting ===
Young made his name playing rough-edged working class Italian-American characters, the best-known example being his signature role as Rocky Balboa's friend (and future brother-in-law) Paulie in Rocky (1976), for which he received an Oscar nomination for Best Supporting Actor. He is one of four actors (the other three being Sylvester Stallone, Stu Nahan, and Tony Burton) who have appeared in all of the first six Rocky films (although Talia Shire, who appears in the first five films, makes a flashback appearance in the sixth). Young did not reprise his role in the 2015 film Creed; the character was described as having died in 2012.

Young appeared in such films as Chinatown, Convoy, Back to School, The Pope of Greenwich Village, Once Upon a Time in America, Last Exit to Brooklyn, Downtown: A Street Tale, and Amityville II: The Possession.

Television appearances for Young included The Rockford Files, Baretta, Law & Order, Walker, Texas Ranger, All in the Family, M*A*S*H, and Miami Vice. He made an appearance on The Sopranos ("Another Toothpick") as Bobby Baccalieri's father, who is dying of cancer and comes out of retirement to execute a hit on his godson, Salvatore "Mustang Sally" Intile, as punishment for Intile having brutally beaten a family friend simply for chatting with Intile's girlfriend.

In 1986, Young appeared alongside Robert De Niro and Ralph Macchio in a Broadway production of Reinaldo Povod's play Cuba and His Teddy Bear.

In a nod to his having served in the U.S. Marine Corps, he played a retired drill instructor in the short-lived 1987 ABC series Roomies, in which his character decides to go to college after his retirement.

In 2017, Burt Young returned to the stage as an aged mob boss in The Last Vig, a play written by Dave Varriale. The show ran from January 14 to February 19, 2017, at The Zephyr Theatre in Los Angeles.

=== Painting and writing ===
Young was also a painter; his art has been displayed in galleries throughout the world. As an artist, he collaborated with the writer Gabriele Tinti, for whom he designed the cover for the poetry collection All Over, as well as contributing the illustrations for the art book A Man. Some of Young's actual paintings were shown in a scene in Rocky Balboa when Paulie gets fired from the meatpacking plant.

Young was also a published author whose works included two filmed screenplays and a 400-page historical novel called Endings. He wrote two stage plays: SOS and A Letter to Alicia and the New York City Government from a Man With a Bullet in His Head.

== Personal life ==
Young's wife, Gloria, died in 1974. He had a daughter and a grandson. He resided in Port Washington, New York.

Young owned a restaurant in the Bronx, New York. He participated in the 1984 New York City Marathon.

== Death ==
Young died at Northridge Hospital Medical Center in Los Angeles, on October 8, 2023, at the age of 83. The immediate cause of death was ruled as cardiac arrest with contributing factors listed as myocardial infarction, atrial fibrillation, and atherosclerosis. He was buried at Mount St. Mary Cemetery in Flushing, Queens.

== Filmography ==
=== Film ===
Year	Title	Role	Notes
1970	Carnival of Blood	Gimpy	Credited as John Harris
1971	Born to Win	First Hood	
1971	The Gang That Couldn't Shoot Straight	Willie Quarequlo	
1972	Across 110th Street	Lapides	
1973	Cinderella Liberty	Master At Arms	
1974	Chinatown	Curly	
1974	The Gambler	Carmine	
1975	The Killer Elite	Mac	
1975	Live A Little, Steal A Lot	Sergeant Bernasconi	
1976	Harry and Walter Go to New York	Warden Durgom	
1976	Rocky	Paulie Pennino	Nominated—Academy Award for Best Supporting Actor
1977	The Choirboys	Scuzzi	
1977	Twilight's Last Gleaming	Augie Garvas	
1978	Convoy	Bobby 'Love Machine' Pig Pen	
1978	Uncle Joe Shannon	Joe Shannon	Also the writer of this film
1979	Rocky II	Paulie Pennino	
1981	Blood Beach	Sergeant Royko	
1981	...All the Marbles	Eddie Cisco	
1982	Rocky III	Paulie Pennino	
1982	Amityville II: The Possession	Anthony Montelli	
1982	Lookin' to Get Out	Jerry Feldman	
1984	Over the Brooklyn Bridge	Phil	
1984	Once Upon a Time in America	Joe Minaldi	
1984	The Pope of Greenwich Village	Eddie 'Bed Bug Eddie' Grant	
1985	Rocky IV	Paulie Pennino	
1985	A Summer to Remember	Fidel Fargo	
1986	Back to School	Lou	
1989	Going Overboard	General Noriega	
1989	Blood Red	Andrews	
1989	Beverly Hills Brats	Clive	
1990	Last Exit to Brooklyn	Joe 'Big Joe'	
1990	Betsy's Wedding	Georgie	
1990	Wait Until Spring, Bandini	Rocco Saccone	
1990	Club Fed	Warden Boyle	
1990	Diving In	Coach Mack	
1990	Backstreet Dreams	Luca	
1990	Rocky V	Paulie Pennino	
1991	Bright Angel	Art	
1991	Red American	George Maniago	
1992	Circle of Fear	Mancini	
1992	Cattive ragazze	Unknown	
1993	Excessive Force	Sal DiMarco	
1995	Opposite Corners	Unknown	Direct-to-video
1996	The Mouse	Himself	
1996	North Star	Reno	Direct-to-video
1997	She's So Lovely	Lorenzo	
1997	Kicked in the Head	Jack	
1997	The Deli	J.C.	
1997	Heaven Before I Die	Pollof	Direct-to-video
1997	The Good Life	Jimmy	Never released
1997	Red-Blooded American Girl II	Roy Falk	Direct-to-video
1997	The Undertaker's Wedding	Alberto	Direct-to-video
1999	Mickey Blue Eyes	Vito Graziosi	
1999	Loser Love	Sydney Delacroix	
2000	The Florentine	Joe McCollough	
2000	Very Mean Men	Dominic Piazza	
2000	Blue Moon	Bobby	
2000	Table One	Frankie Chips	Direct-to-video
2002	The Adventures of Pluto Nash	Gino	
2002	Checkout	Uncle Louie	
2002	2 Birds 1 Stallone	Himself	
2002	Kiss the Bride	Santo Sposato	
2003	Crooked Line	Mike Ameche	
2004	The Wager	Jack Stockman	
2004	Los Angeles Plays Itself	Curly In Chinatown	Uncredited, archive footage
2005	Land of Plenty	Sherman	
2005	Carlito's Way: Rise to Power	Artie Bottolota Sr.	Direct-to-video
2005	Shut Up and Kiss Me	Vincent Bublioni	
2005	Hubert Selby Jr: It/ll Be Better Tomorrow	Actor	Uncredited, archive footage
2005	Transamerica	Murray	
2006	RevoLOUtion: The Transformation of Lou Benedetti	Himself	
2006	Nicky's Game	Leo Singer	Short film
2006	Rocky Balboa	Paulie Pennino	
2006	In The Ring	Himself	Video documentary
2006	Tribute to Burgess Meredith	Himself (voice)	Video documentary short
2007	Blue Lake Massacre	Pops	
2007	Downtown: A Street Tale	Gus	
2007	The 21st Annual Genesis Awards	Himself	Video
2007	Skill vs. Will: The Making of 'Rocky Balboa'	Himself	Video documentary short
2007	Go Go Tales	Murray	
2007	Oliviero Rising	Santino	
2007	The Hideout	Mueller	
2007	Hack!	J.T. Bates	Direct-to-video
2008	Carnera: The Walking Mountain	Lou Serosi	
2008	Rocky Jumped a Park Bench	Himself	Documentary short, archive footage
2009	New York, I Love You	Landlord	
2010	Kingshighway	Mario Capriolini	
2011	Win Win	Leo Poplar	
2012	Casting By	Himself	Documentary
2013	See You Tomorrow	Mario Palagonia	
2013	All Over	Himself - Host	Video short
2014	Tom in America	Michael	Short film
2014	Zarra's Law	Paul Canto	
2014	Rob the Mob	Joey D.	
2015	The Elevator: Three Minutes Can Change Your Life	George	
2015	Lostland	Actor	Short film
2015	Irene & Marie	John	Short film
2015	Fall 4 You	Dominick	Short film
2016	The Dicks	Ed	Short film
2017	The Neighborhood	'Jingles'	
2017	King Rat	Art Stillman	
2017	John G. Avildsen: King of the Underdogs	Himself	Documentary
2018	The Selfish Ones	Father John (voice)	Short film
2018	6 Grandchildren And One Grandfather	Grandfather	
2018	Sarah Q	Grandpa	
2018	The Amityville Murders	Brigante	
2018	Road to the Lemon Grove	Zio Vincenzo	
2019	The Brawler	Salvatore	
2019	Bottom of the 9th	Scaleri	
2019	Vault	Don Ruggiero	
2019	Tapestry	Ian	
2019	Smothered by Mothers	Ivan	
2020	40 Years of Rocky: The Birth of a Classic	Himself - Paulie Pennino	Documentary short, archive audio
2020	Beckman	Salvatore	
2021	Stallone: Frank, That Is	Himself	Documentary
2021	Charlie Boy	Luca	
2021	The Final Code	Detective	
TBA	Way of the Warriors	George Stevens	In production
TBA	Asleep at the Wheel	Judge	In production

=== Television ===
Year	Title	Role	Notes
1969	The Doctors	Bartender	Episode #1785 10 October 1969
1973	The Connection	Ernie	Television film
1973	M*A*S*H	Lieutenant Willis	Episode: "L.I.P. (Local Indigenous Personnel)"
1974	The Great Niagara	Ace Tully	Television film
1975	Hustling	Gustavino	Television film
1976	The Rockford Files	Stuart Gaily	Episode: "The Family Hour"
1975–1976	Baretta	Willy; Solomon; Johnny Checco	Episodes: "Keep Your Eye on the Sparrow" "The Big Hand's on Trouble" (Also the writer of this episode) "Soldier in the Jungle"
1976	Serpico	Alec Rosen	Episode: "The Deadly Game"
1976	Woman of the Year	Ralph Rodino	Television film
1977	Good Morning America	Himself – Guest	Episode: "17 March 1977"
1977	The 49th Annual Academy Awards	Himself – Nominee	Television special
1978	Daddy, I Don't Like It Like This	Rocco Agnelli	Television film, Also the writer of this film
1979–1980	The Mike Douglas Show	Himself – Guest	2 episodes
1980	The 6th People's Choice Awards	Himself – Accepting Favourite Motion Picture Award	Television special
1980	Murder Can Hurt You	Lt. Palumbo	Television film
1983	You and Me Kid	Actor	Television series
1984	Miami Vice	Lupo Ramirez	Episode: "Give a Little, Take a Little"
1985	Airwolf		Episode: "Prisoner of Yesterday"
1985	A Summer to Remember	Fidel Fargo	Television film
1985	Playboy Mid Summer Night's Dream Party 1985	Himself	Television film
1985	The Equalizer	Louie Ganucci	Episode: "The Confirmation Day"
1986	Alfred Hitchcock Presents	Ed Fratus	Episode 1x23, "Road Hog"
1986	Nightlife	Himself	1 episode
1987	Roomies	Nick Chase	8 episodes
1990	Vendetta: Secrets of a Mafia Bride	Vincent Dominici	Television miniseries
1992	The Final Contract		Television film
1992	Tales from the Crypt	Gambler	Episode: "Split Personality"
1993	Double Deception	Zimmer	Television film
1994	Columbo	Mo Weinberg	Episode: "Undercover"
1994	Crocodile Shoes	Lou Benedetti	Television miniseries
1995	Bless This House	Mr. Riveto	Episode: "The Postman Always Moves Twice"
1996–1997	Walker, Texas Ranger	Jack "Soldier" Belmont	2 episodes
1997	The Last Don	Virginio Ballazzo	Television miniseries
1997	Law & Order	Lewis Darnell	Episode: "Mad Dog"
1997	Before Women Had Wings	Louis Ippolito	Television film
1997	The Outer Limits	Captain Parker	Episode: "Tempests"
1998	Greener Fields	Gallagher	Television film
1999	The Making of a Mobster: 'Mickey Blue Eyes'	Himself	Television short documentary
2000	The Howard Stern Show	Himself – Guest	Episode: "6 May 2000"
2001	The Sopranos	Bobby "Bacala" Baccalieri Sr.	Episode: "Another Toothpick"
2002	Alternate Realities	Frank	Television series
2003	The Handler	Dino Mantoni	Episode: "Bruno Comes Back"
2004	I'm With Her	Himself	Episode: "Winners & Losers & Whiners & Boozers: Part 2"
2005–2011	Biography	Himself	2 episodes
2005	The Contenders	Himself	4 episodes
2007	La noche desesperada	Murray	Television film, archive footage
2008	Cinemania	Himself	Episode: "Rocky IV"
2009	Law & Order: Special Victims Unit	Eddy Mack	Episode: "Snatched"
2011	The Rocky Saga: Going the Distance	Himself	Television film documentary
2013	Baciamo le mani – Palermo New York 1958	Gillo Draghi	Television miniseries (Italian)
2014	Turning Point with Frank McKay	Himself	Episode: "Frank McKay with Burt Young"
2015	The Jack and Triumph Show	Himself	Episode: "Sorvino's Pants"
2016	Brows Held High	Paulie Pennino	Episode: "Rocky and the Methods of Montage"
2016	Horace and Pete	Horace Sr.	Web miniseries, Episode #1.10
2018	Kevin Can Wait	Marv	Season 2
2019	Russian Doll	Joe	Recurring role, 2 episodes
