= Rocky: Original Motion Picture Score =

Soundtrack album by Bill Conti
- Released: November 12, 1976
- Genre: Philadelphia soul
- Length: 31:25
- Labels: United Artists Records; EMI Records/Capitol Records (reissue)

Singles from Rocky
- 1. "Gonna Fly Now" Released: February 28, 1977

Professional ratings
Review scores
Source	Rating
AllMusic	4.5/5 stars
Filmtracks.com	4/5 stars

Rocky: Original Motion Picture Score is a soundtrack album for the 1976 American film Rocky, composed by Bill Conti. It was released on vinyl in the United States on November 12, 1976, by United Artists Records, followed by a CD release by EMI Records on November 7, 1988. The soundtrack is notable for its inclusion of "Gonna Fly Now", the theme song from Rocky.

== Overview ==
Although the Conti version of "Gonna Fly Now" is the most recognizable arrangement, a cover of the song performed by legendary trumpeter Maynard Ferguson on his Conquistador album prior to the release of the motion picture soundtrack actually outsold the soundtrack itself. The version of Conti's "Gonna Fly Now" released on later records and CDs differs from the version used in the film, with the vocals and guitars much more emphasized in the film than on the versions released. The audio of the version played in the movie has yet to be officially released. Parts of the song contain phases of the German fanfare march "Fehrbelliner Reitermarsch".

== Track listing ==
All music by Bill Conti.

1. "Gonna Fly Now (Theme from Rocky)" (vocals: DeEtta Little/Nelson Pigford) – 2:48
2. "Philadelphia Morning" – 2:22
3. "Going the Distance" – 2:40
4. "Reflections" – 3:19
5. "Marines' Hymn/Yankee Doodle" (Jacques Offenbach/Thomas Holcomb/Traditional, arranged by Conti) – 1:45
6. "Take You Back (Street Corner Song from Rocky)" (vocals: Valentine; written by F. Stallone, Jr.) – 1:49
7. "First Date" – 1:54
8. "You Take My Heart Away" (vocals: DeEtta Little/Nelson Pigford) – 4:46
9. "Fanfare for Rocky" – 2:34
10. "Butkus" – 2:12
11. "Alone in the Ring" – 1:09
12. "The Final Bell" – 1:56
13. "Rocky's Reward" – 2:03

== Personnel ==
- Composer, conductor, orchestrator, producer - Bill Conti
- Recording engineer - Ami Hadani

Performers (uncredited):

- The Hollywood Studio Symphony
- Trumpet - Malcolm McNab, Tony Terran, Graham Young, Maurice Harris, Robert DiVall, Uan Rasey
- Horn - Vincent DeRosa, Richard Perissi, Arthur Maebe, Gale Robinson
- Trombone - Dick Nash, Lloyd Ulyate
- Bass trombone - George Roberts
- Tuba - Tommy Johnson

== Charts ==
=== Weekly charts ===
Chart (1977)	Peak position
Australia (Kent Music Report)	38
Canada Top Albums/CDs (RPM)	11
US Billboard 200	4
US Top R&B Albums (Billboard)	32

=== Year-end charts ===
Chart (1977)	Position
Canada Top Albums/CDs (RPM)	69
US Billboard 200	37

== Certifications ==
Region	Certification	Certified units/sales
Canada (Music Canada)	Gold	50,000^{^}
United States (RIAA)	Platinum	1,000,000^{^}
^{^} Shipments figures based on certification alone.

== Additional music ==
Additional music featured in Rocky:

Title	Musician(s)	Key scenes/Notes
"Summer Madness"	Kool & the Gang	Plays when Rocky returns to his home after his match against Spider Rico.
