= Gonna Fly Now =

Single by Bill Conti

from the album Rocky: Original Motion Picture Score
- B-side: "Reflections"
- Released: February 1977
- Genre: Philly soul
- Length: 2:48
- Label: United Artists
- Songwriters: Bill Conti; Carol Connors; Ayn Robbins
- Producer: Bill Conti

Bill Conti singles chronology
"Gonna Fly Now" (1977)	"Redemption" (1979)

"Gonna Fly Now", also known as "Theme from Rocky", is the theme song from the movie Rocky, composed by Bill Conti with lyrics by Carol Connors and Ayn Robbins, and performed by DeEtta West and Nelson Pigford. Released in 1976 with Rocky, the song became part of 1970s American popular culture, after the film's main character and namesake Rocky Balboa, as part of his daily training regimen, runs up the 72 stone steps leading to the entrance of the Philadelphia Museum of Art in Philadelphia and raises his arms in a victory pose, while the song plays.

== Reception ==
Gonna Fly Now (whose lyrics are only 30 words long) was nominated for Best Original Song at the 49th Academy Awards. The version of the song from the movie, performed by Conti with an orchestra, hit number one on the Billboard Hot 100 chart in 1977, while a version by jazz trumpeter Maynard Ferguson hit the top 30. Disco versions by Rhythm Heritage and Current were on the chart at the same time (Conti's own version reveals some early disco influence in the orchestration). Billboard ranked Conti's version as the No. 21 song of 1977. Conti's single was certified Gold by the RIAA, for shipments exceeding one million in the United States. The American Film Institute placed it 58th on its AFI's 100 Years...100 Songs list.

New York Times critic John Rockwell called it "a classic bit of movie-music pomposity" but said it had a "cheesy inspirational appeal."

== Variations ==
In Rocky II, an alternative version of the song was used, with a children's choir singing the chorus. Rocky III included an updated disco-influenced arrangement during the training montage on the beach. This recording is however missing from the soundtrack album, the sleeve notes of which say "All music on this album selected by Sylvester Stallone", who instead opted to reprise the original versions of "Reflections" from the first film, and "Gonna Fly Now" and "Conquest" from the second installment.

Rocky IV was scored by Vince DiCola, who mainly introduced new themes of his own, but "Gonna Fly Now" returned with its composer for later installments. In Rocky V, two different versions of the song are played: an instrumental horn version and a different orchestral version. In Rocky Balboa, a slightly different version of the song used more trumpets and different vocal tones. The soundtrack for that film also includes a vocal remix performed by Natalie Wilde. Creed samples the first few notes of the track during the film's last fight, as does its sequel, Creed II.

== 17th-century origin of Rocky theme ==
Conti's iconic dual introductory trumpet piece for the "Rocky" character (and the opening of "Gonna Fly Now") was directly transferred from an anonymous 17th-century sonatina written for use in the Italian royal dinner court. Conti's Rocky trumpet pieces are easily identifiable from the 17th-century "Three Sonatinas for 2 Clarini" released by Warner Records' Nonesuch label, on the 1966 album The Art of the Baroque Trumpet (see track 1).

== Personnel ==
- Writing – Bill Conti, Carol Connors, Ayn Robbins
- Producer – Bill Conti
- Recording engineer – Ami Hadani
- Vocals – DeEtta Little West and Nelson Pigford
- Drums – John Guerin
- Bass – Max Bennett
- Guitar – Dennis Budimir
- Piano – Mike Melvoin

== Charts ==
=== Weekly charts ===
Rhythm Heritage

Chart (1977)	Peak position
Canada Top Singles (RPM)	92
US Hot 100 (Billboard)	94
US Adult Contemporary (Billboard)	49

Bill Conti

Chart (1977)	Peak position
Australia (KMR)	13
Canada Top Singles (RPM)	8
Canada Adult Contemporary (RPM)	14
New Zealand (Recorded Music NZ)	22
US Billboard Hot 100	1
US Adult Contemporary (Billboard)	20
US Cash Box Top 100	1

Chart (2007)	Peak position
Ireland (IRMA)	16
UK Singles (Official Charts)	52
US Hot Ringtones (Billboard)	19

=== Year-end charts ===
Chart (1977)	Rank
Australia	67
Canada	82
US Billboard Hot 100	21

Maynard Ferguson

Chart (1977)	Peak position
Australian (Kent Music Report)	57
Canada Top Singles (RPM)	55
US Hot 100 (Billboard)	28
US Adult Contemporary (Billboard)	46
US Cash Box Top 100	31

Current

Chart (1977)	Peak position
US Hot 100 (Billboard)	94

== Certifications ==
Region	Certification	Certified units/sales
United Kingdom (BPI)	Silver	200,000^{‡}
United States (RIAA)	Gold	1,000,000^{^}
^{^} Shipments figures based on certification alone.^{‡} Sales+streaming figures based on certification alone.

== In popular culture ==
The daily French radio program Les Grosses Têtes, on the RTL French radio network, uses an arrangement by Gaya Bécaud from "Gonna Fly Now".

American businessman Donald Trump used "Gonna Fly Now" at his 2016 presidential campaign rallies. When composer Bill Conti was asked what he thought of Trump's use of the song, Conti stated: “I think it's great. I’m an equal opportunity kind of guy. The song is my creation. And anytime something I create is used, I am happy about that. Music has no politics attached to it."
