= Rocky V =

1990 film by John G. Avildsen

- Theatrical release poster
- Directed by: John G. Avildsen
- Written by: Sylvester Stallone
- Based on: Characters by Sylvester Stallone
- Produced by: Irwin Winkler; Robert Chartoff
- Starring: Sylvester Stallone; Talia Shire; Burt Young; Sage Stallone; Tommy Morrison; Burgess Meredith
- Cinematography: Steven Poster
- Edited by: John G. Avildsen; Michael N. Knue
- Music by: Bill Conti
- Production company: Chartoff-Winkler Productions
- Distributed by: United Artists (United States); United International Pictures (International)
- Release date: November 16, 1990 (United States)
- Running time: 104 minutes
- Country: United States
- Language: English
- Budget: $30–42 million
- Box office: $119.9 million

Rocky V is a 1990 American sports drama film directed by John G. Avildsen and written by and starring Sylvester Stallone. It is the sequel to Rocky IV (1985) and the fifth installment in the Rocky franchise. It also stars Talia Shire, Burt Young, Stallone's son Sage in his film debut, Tommy Morrison, and Burgess Meredith. In the film, a financially struggling Rocky Balboa (Stallone) agrees to train protégé Tommy Gunn (Morrison) at the gym once owned by Balboa's trainer Mickey Goldmill (Meredith).

Development for the film began in 1989, after Stallone, who wanted to end the series, completed the screenplay. Avildsen, who directed the first film, was soon confirmed to return and principal photography began in January 1990, being largely filmed on location around Philadelphia. The filmmakers encountered creative differences with United Artists and were unable to include darker elements of Stallone's original screenplay.

Rocky V was released in the United States on November 16, 1990. The film received mixed-to-negative reviews from critics, who criticized the screenplay, characterization, continuity errors, and medical inaccuracies, and initially deemed it a disappointing conclusion to the series. Nevertheless, the film was commercially successful, grossing $119 million worldwide on a $30–42 million budget, albeit becoming the lowest-grossing film of the franchise. A sequel, Rocky Balboa, was released in 2006.

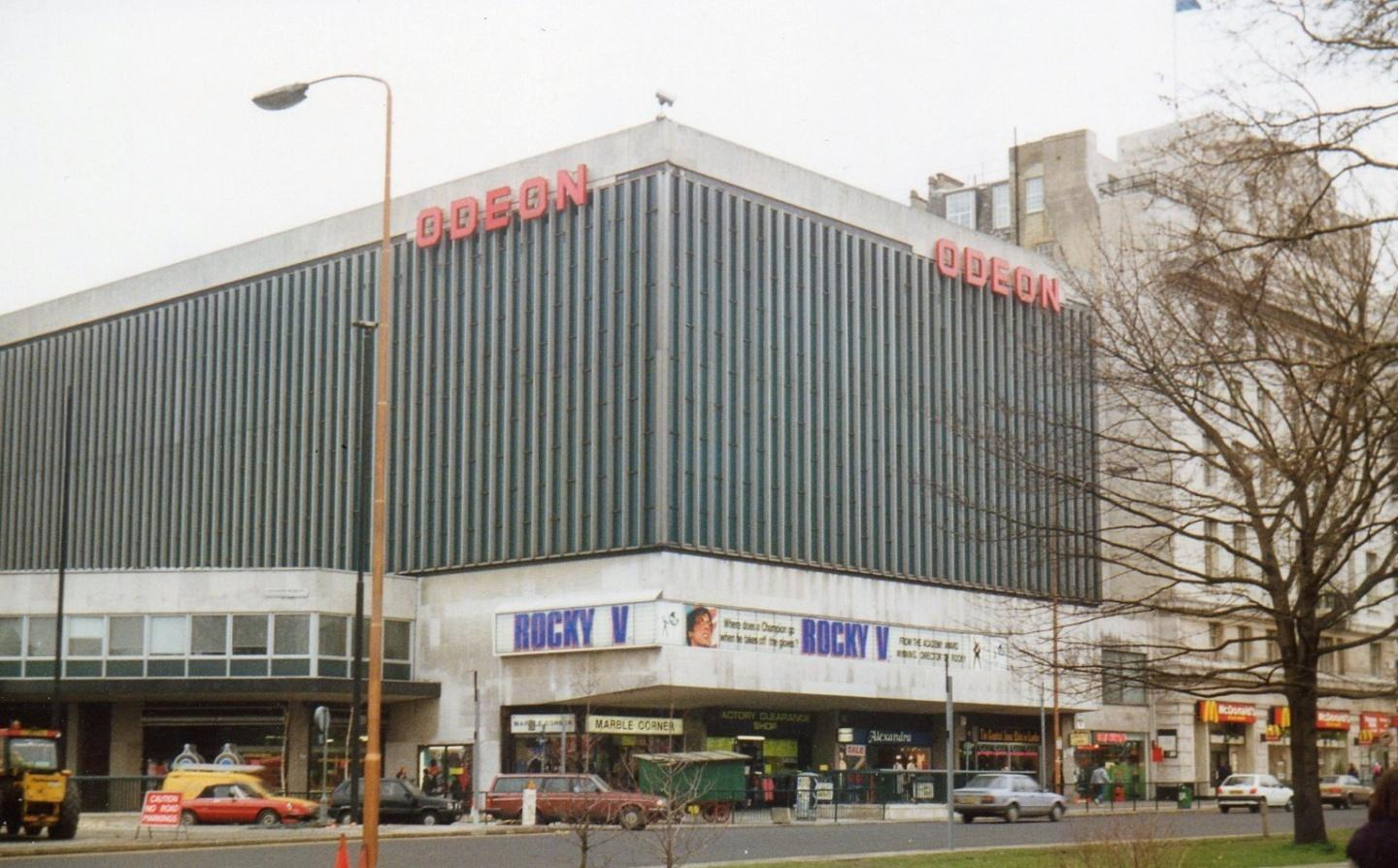
Screenings at Marble Arch Odeon in London, UK

== Plot ==
After his victory over Ivan Drago in Moscow, (Note: As depicted in Rocky IV (1985)) Rocky Balboa finds himself experiencing physical trauma from the fight. He returns with his wife Adrian, brother-in-law Paulie, and trainer Tony "Duke" Evers to the United States, where Rocky's son Robert Jr. greets the group. At a press conference, boxing promoter George Washington Duke attempts to goad Rocky into fighting his boxer, Union Cane, who is the top-rated challenger, but Rocky appears uninterested in accepting or declining.

When the group returns home, however, Rocky and Adrian discover they are bankrupt after Paulie was fooled into signing a "power of attorney" over to Rocky's accountant, who embezzled all of his money on unfavorable real estate deals and neglected to pay Rocky's taxes over the previous six years. He is unable to secure a merchandising deal due to his history as a loan shark (Note: As depicted in Rocky (1976)) resurfacing, and his mansion has been mortgaged by $400,000, but his attorney tells Rocky that it is fixable with a few more fights. Rocky initially accepts the fight with Cane, but Adrian urges him to see a doctor, and he is diagnosed with cavum septi pellucidi.

Reluctantly, Rocky retires from boxing. His home and belongings are sold to pay the debt and the Balboas move back to their old working-class neighborhood in Philadelphia. Rocky visits Mighty Mick's Gym (willed to his son by his old trainer Mickey Goldmill), which has fallen into disrepair. Seeing a vision of himself and Mickey from years past, Rocky draws inspiration to become a trainer himself and reopens the gym. One day, Paulie and Rocky meet a young fighter from Oklahoma named Tommy Gunn. Under Rocky's management, Tommy rises to become a top contender. Distracted with Tommy's training, Rocky neglects Robert, who is being bullied at school. After learning to defend himself, Robert falls in with the wrong crowd and becomes withdrawn from his family.

Union Cane wins the vacant world heavyweight title, but still wanting to do business with Rocky, Duke showers Tommy with luxuries and promises him that he is the only path to a shot at the title. Rocky insists dealing with Duke will end badly, causing Tommy to desert him. Adrian attempts to comfort Rocky; when he frustratedly retorts that training Tommy had renewed his sense of purpose, she pointedly tells Rocky that Tommy never had his heart. Realizing that his family is his top priority, Rocky apologizes to Adrian and the two embrace. Rocky then apologizes to Robert and they mend their relationship.

Tommy defeats Cane for the heavyweight title with a first-round knockout, but the spectators reject him for abandoning Rocky and crediting his success solely to Duke. Consequently, the fans and media denounce Tommy as a "paper champion" because he did not win the title from Balboa. Duke convinces Tommy that he needs to secure a fight with Rocky to refute such a notion. Duke and Tommy show up at the local bar with a live television crew to goad Rocky into accepting a title fight. Rocky declines and tries to reason with him, but Tommy calls him weak, prompting Paulie to stand up for Rocky. When Tommy punches Paulie, Rocky challenges Tommy to a street fight on the spot; despite Duke's objections, Tommy accepts.

Initially knocked to the ground by Rocky's flurry of punches, Tommy gets up and attacks Rocky from behind, punching him to the ground. Rocky experiences nightmarish visions of Drago before a vision of Mickey urges him to get up and continue the fight. When Robert and Adrian see the brawl being televised, they rush to the back alley to cheer for Rocky. With Robert, Paulie, Adrian and the neighborhood crowd cheering him on, Rocky utilizes his street-fighting skills and defeats Tommy. While Tommy is escorted away by the police, Duke threatens to sue Rocky if he touches him. Rocky briefly hesitates before knocking him onto the hood of a car, defiantly replying "Sue me for what?"

Months later, Rocky and Robert climb up the Rocky Steps, visit his statue, and are about to go inside and explore the Philadelphia Museum of Art when Rocky gives his son Rocky Marciano's cufflink, which Mickey had gifted to Rocky years earlier.

== Cast ==
- Sylvester Stallone as Robert "Rocky" Balboa, "The Italian Stallion": heavyweight boxing world-champion who has brain damage caused by Ivan Drago. Because of his injuries, Rocky is forced to officially retire from boxing. After moving back to Philadelphia, Rocky trains and manages underdog boxer Tommy Gunn and helps him rise to fame.
- Talia Shire as Adrian Pennino: Rocky's wife throughout his life and boxing career.
- Burt Young as Paulie Pennino: Rocky's friend and brother-in-law.
- Sage Stallone as Robert "Rocky" Balboa Jr.: Rocky and Adrian's only son, who gets involved with the wrong crowds during his father's absence throughout the training and mentoring of Tommy Gunn.
- Tommy Morrison as Tommy "The Machine" Gunn: Underdog boxer, who rises to fame under Rocky's training. Throughout his career he is called Rocky's "shadow", and angrily seeks out another manager. After his achievements as heavyweight champion, and the public's continued dis-appreciation for him, he fights Rocky in a street fight.
- Burgess Meredith as Mickey Goldmill: Rocky's deceased friend, manager and trainer, a former bantamweight fighter from the 1920s and the owner of the local boxing gym. Meredith appears in new footage, filmed as a flashback before Rocky's second fight with Apollo.
- Richard Gant as George Washington Duke: Loud and obnoxious boxing promoter, who repeatedly tries to convince Rocky to re-enter the ring. He becomes Tommy Gunn's manager during his shot at the heavyweight champion title.
- Tony Burton as Tony "Duke" Evers: Rocky's friend, and former trainer and manager of Apollo Creed.
- Michael Williams as Union Cane: Reigning heavyweight champion who wants to fight Rocky, and eventually fights Tommy Gunn.
- Delia Sheppard as Karen.

The film has cameos by sportswriters and boxing analysts, including Al Bernstein, Stan Hochman and Al Meltzer, and sportscaster Stu Nahan, who was the ringside announcer in every Rocky movie except the sixth. Dolph Lundgren and Carl Weathers appear as Ivan Drago and Apollo Creed in archival footage, uncredited. Mr. T appears as his Rocky III character Clubber Lang in archival footage, uncredited. Hulk Hogan, from his Rocky III role as Thunderlips, appears in a still shot during the film's end credits sequence taken from the staredown the two engaged in, also uncredited.

Jodi Letizia, who played street kid Marie in the original Rocky, was supposed to reprise her role. Her character was shown to have ended up as Rocky predicted she would: a prostitute. She can briefly be seen during the street fight at the end.

Kevin Connolly, who later gained success as Eric Murphy on HBO's Entourage, appeared in his first acting role as neighborhood bully Chickie.

== Production ==
=== Filming ===
Filming began in mid-January 1990. Some of the fight sequences were filmed at The Blue Horizon in Philadelphia, a venue which was a mecca for boxing in the city during the 1970s.

The Rocky statue, which was commissioned for Rocky III, had since been gifted to the city of Philadelphia and moved to the entrance of the Spectrum, and so had to be moved back to the Philadelphia Museum of Art for the filming.

Scenes with Mickey, played by Burgess Meredith, were trimmed in the final film when Rocky fights Tommy. Mickey appeared in ghost form on top of the railway bridge, giving words of encouragement. In the final film, this was made into flashbacks. The speech Mickey gives to Rocky in the flashback sequence is based on an interview with Cus D'Amato given in 1985, shortly after Mike Tyson's first professional bout.

In the original script, Rocky is killed during the final fight with Tommy, dying in Adrian's arms in the street. The ending, which had Adrian eulogize Rocky by saying, "As long as there are people willing to meet challenges of life and not surrender until their dreams become realities, the world will always have their Rockys", would not come to pass. Producer Irwin Winkler and Avildsen were not big on the ending, with the former stating that it was never shot while also stating that Stallone eventually was convinced to change the ending.

The film's climax street fight scene between Rocky and Tommy was choreographed by professional wrestler Terry Funk, who had a long working relationship with Stallone.

=== Continuity ===
In the years following the film's release, Stallone acknowledged that the injury which forces Rocky to retire, referenced in the film as a potentially lethal form of 'brain damage', was inaccurate. Stallone stated that having discussed the story with many boxing medical professionals, the injury Rocky suffered was a milder form of brain damage, similar to that of a long term concussion that many boxers suffer from and by modern-day standards are still able to gain licenses to box. It would not have prevented Rocky from gaining a license to box nor killed him, which is why he is allowed to box again in Rocky Balboa.

The age of Robert Jr. has often been cited as a continuity error, as in Rocky IV, which is set in 1985, he is 9 years old, yet in Rocky V, which takes place immediately after Rocky IV, he is 14 years old.

== Reception ==
=== Box office ===
Though it was anticipated to be one of the big hits of the 1990 holiday season, Rocky V finished second in its opening weekend, trailing behind Home Alone and it never recovered, though managed to beat The Rescuers Down Under during its opening weekend at the box office by earning $14 million compared to Down Under's $3.5 million. The film earned $41 million in the domestic box office less than Rocky IV 's $127 million but it was financially successful in the international box office earning $79 million for a total of $120 million worldwide. However, it ultimately grossed far less than Rocky IV 's $300 million.

=== Critical response ===
On review aggregator Rotten Tomatoes the film has a 36% approval rating based on 121 reviews, with an average rating of 4.7/10. The website's consensus is that "Rocky V's attempts to recapture the original's working-class grit are as transparently phony as each of the thuddingly obvious plot developments in a misguided installment that sent the franchise flailing into longterm limbo." On Metacritic it has a score of 55 out of 100, based on review from 16 critics, indicating "mixed or average reviews." Audiences polled by CinemaScore gave the film an average grade of "A" on an A+ to F scale.

In 1999, Time placed the film on a list of the 100 worst ideas of the 20th century.

Upon its release, the Los Angeles Times regarded it as the best of the Rocky sequels.

Stallone has publicly expressed hatred towards Rocky V, giving it a 0 out of 10, claiming that part of the reason why he made Rocky Balboa was to give the character a better send-off than the one he got in Rocky V.

=== Accolades ===
It was nominated for seven Golden Raspberry Awards in 1990 including Worst Picture, Worst Actor and Worst Screenplay for Stallone, Worst Actress for Shire, Worst Supporting Actor for Young, Worst Director for Avildsen and Worst Original Song for "The Measure of a Man".

== Sequel ==
Sixteen years later, Stallone wrote, directed and starred in the film Rocky Balboa. Stallone suggested that advances in medical science during the period between the films had shown that the injuries mentioned in Rocky V were less debilitating than once thought, and that he would receive a "clean bill of health" by the time of Rocky Balboa, allowing him to box again.

== Video game ==
In 2002, a video game called Rocky, based on the first five Rocky films, was released by Rage Software.

== See also ==
- List of boxing films
