= Rocky Balboa (film) =

2006 film by Sylvester Stallone

- Theatrical release poster
- Directed by: Sylvester Stallone
- Written by: Sylvester Stallone
- Based on: Characters by Sylvester Stallone
- Produced by: Charles Winkler; William Chartoff; David Winkler; Kevin King
- Starring: Sylvester Stallone; Burt Young; Antonio Tarver
- Cinematography: Clark Mathis
- Edited by: Sean Albertson
- Music by: Bill Conti
- Production companies: Metro-Goldwyn-Mayer Pictures; Columbia Pictures; Revolution Studios; Chartoff Productions; Winkler Films
- Distributed by: MGM Distribution Co.
- Release date: December 20, 2006
- Running time: 102 minutes (Theatrical cut); 116 minutes (Director's cut)
- Country: United States
- Language: English
- Budget: $24 million
- Box office: $156 million

Rocky Balboa is a 2006 American sports drama film starring, written and directed by Sylvester Stallone. It is the sequel to Rocky V (1990) and the sixth installment in the Rocky franchise. The film co-stars Burt Young and Antonio Tarver in his only acting role. In the film, Rocky Balboa (Stallone), now an aging small restaurant owner, is challenged to an exhibition fight by hothead young boxer Mason Dixon (Tarver).

Development for a sixth Rocky film began after Stallone expressed regret over the outcome of Rocky V, which was viewed as a disappointing conclusion to the series. Rocky Balboa includes references to characters and objects from previous installments, and Stallone was inspired by recent personal struggles and triumphs when writing the film. It is Stallone's first directorial effort since Rocky IV (1985). Principal photography began in December 2005 and lasted until January 2006, with filming locations including Las Vegas, Los Angeles, and Philadelphia. In contrast to previous entries in the franchise, the fight choreography in Rocky Balboa was less scripted, featuring real punches thrown by Stallone and Tarver. It is also the latest film overall for composer Bill Conti, the composer of the first three and fifth films in the series.

It was produced by Metro-Goldwyn-Mayer, Columbia Pictures, Revolution Studios, Chartoff Productions and Winkler Films, and theatrically released by MGM Distribution Co. on December 20, 2006, sixteen years after the release of Rocky V and thirty years after the release of the first film. It is the first Rocky film not to be released under the United Artists banner, the franchise's original owner and distributor, and the last to be written or directed solely by Stallone, though he would remain a producer to the Creed films, the second of which he co-wrote.

It received generally positive reviews from critics, with praise for its screenplay, Stallone's performance, and heartfelt exploration of Balboa's character, with many critics calling it a significant improvement over its predecessor, and many labelling the film one of the best entries in the franchise. It was also a commercial success, grossing $156 million worldwide. A spin-off, Creed, was released in 2015 and started its own series.

== Plot ==
Sixteen years after his street fight with Tommy "The Machine" Gunn, (Note: As depicted in Rocky V (1990)) Rocky Balboa, now approaching sixty years of age, is long retired from boxing and lives a quiet life in Philadelphia as a widower, having lost his wife Adrian to cancer four years prior. He now runs a small but successful Italian restaurant named after her, where he regales patrons with tales from his past. He also battles personal demons involving his grief over Adrian's death and his eroding relationship with his son Robert, now a moderately successful young corporate accountant. Paulie Pennino, Rocky's best friend and brother-in-law, continues to support him whenever he can, but is guilt-ridden over his past poor treatment of Adrian and accuses Rocky of living in the past.

Late one night, Rocky meets a woman named Marie, who was once a troublesome young girl Rocky had escorted home thirty years earlier. (Note: As depicted in Rocky (1976)) Marie now is a single parent of a teenage son named Stephenson and nicknamed "Steps", born out of wedlock. Rocky's relationship with Marie quickly blossoms over the following weeks and he meets and bonds with Steps, providing him with a much-needed buffer for his anguish.

Meanwhile, on the professional boxing circuit, Mason "The Line" Dixon reigns as the undefeated yet unpopular heavyweight world champion, often ridiculed for having never fought a true contender. This leads to tension with the public and his promoters and encourages him to return to his roots: the small gym he first trained in and his old trainer Martin, who sagely tells him that, inevitably, he will earn back his respect through a true opponent that will test him. ESPN later broadcasts a computer simulation of a fight between a younger Rocky and Mason – likened to a modern-day version of The Super Fight – that ends in a disputed KO victory for Rocky, further riling the champ. In contrast, the simulation inspires Rocky to take up boxing again, an intention that goes public when he successfully renews his boxing license. Dixon's promoters pitch the idea of holding a charity exhibition bout at the Mandalay Bay Resort and Casino in Las Vegas to bolster Dixon's floundering popularity. In the midst of this chaos, Paulie is laid off from his job.

With some hesitation, both men agree to the match, creating a media buzz that stabs at Rocky's age and Dixon's credibility. Robert later makes an effort to discourage Rocky from fighting, blaming his own personal failings on his father's celebrity shadow, but Rocky rebukes him with a rousing speech: in order to succeed in life, "it ain't about how hard you hit – it's about how hard you can get hit and keep moving forward!"; blaming others is the coward's way. The next day, Robert meets Rocky at Adrian's grave and reconciles with him, having quit his job to be at Rocky's side.

Rocky sets straight to training with Apollo Creed's old trainer, Duke Evers, who quickly surmises that the aging Rocky can only compete by building his strength and punching power as much as possible. Alongside Robert, Paulie, and Steps, he uses the same unorthodox training methods that he used for his first fight with Apollo, such as using sides of beef as punching bags. On the day of the match, Dixon easily dominates the first round, only to injure his left hand on Rocky's hip in the second. Rocky then makes a dramatic comeback, knocking Mason down, and surprising the audience with his prowess and chin despite his age.

The two combatants beat each other severely throughout the full 10 rounds, ending with both men still standing, although Rocky gets the last punch. Rocky thanks an appreciative Dixon for the match and tells him that he is a great champion, while the audience applauds the two fighters. The result is announced as Rocky exits the ring with his family and friends: a win for Dixon by a close split decision, but Rocky does not mind the outcome, and the crowd gives him a final standing ovation.

Rocky returns home and visits Adrian's grave again, thanking her for helping him in spirit and saying "Yo Adrian, we did it. We did it."

== Cast ==
- Sylvester Stallone as Robert "Rocky" Balboa, retired boxer and former two-time heavyweight champion.
- Burt Young as Paulie Pennino, Rocky's brother-in-law and best friend.
- Antonio Tarver as Mason "The Line" Dixon, Rocky's opponent. Dixon is shown as the current heavyweight champion of the world, but a fighter who is not shown the same respect as Rocky was when he was the world champion.
- Milo Ventimiglia as Robert Balboa Jr., Rocky's only son.
- Geraldine Hughes as Marie, a woman whom Rocky originally met thirty years ago.
- James Francis Kelly III as Stephenson ("Steps"), Marie's son, whom Rocky befriends.
- Tony Burton as Tony "Duke" Evers, Rocky's trainer who has been his head cornerman since Balboa's second fight with Clubber Lang in Rocky III (1982). Duke previously trained Apollo Creed, who was Rocky's nemesis in Rocky (1976) and Rocky II (1979); Duke trained Rocky with Apollo's help in the third film, and he becomes much closer to Rocky after Apollo's death in Rocky IV (1985).
- Henry G. Sanders as Martin, Mason's trainer.
- Pedro Lovell as Spider Rico, Rocky's former opponent and current employee at Adrian's. Lovell reprises his role from the first film.
- Jacob "Stitch" Duran as himself, Mason's cutman.
- Frank Stallone as Dinner Patron

Talia Shire reappears as Adrianna "Adrian" Pennino, Rocky's deceased wife, through the use of archive footage. Bert Sugar, a well-known boxing historian, appears as himself, credited as Ring Magazine reporter. Michael Buffer also appears as himself, as the announcer for the match between Rocky and Mason, as do boxing promoter Lou DiBella and Mike Tyson.

== Production ==
=== Development ===
A plot element from Rocky V (1990) is not addressed in Rocky Balboa. In the previous film, Rocky Balboa was diagnosed with brain damage and advised never to fight again. Sylvester Stallone clarified this apparent inconsistency in an interview:

many athletes have a form of brain damage including football players, soccer players, and other individuals in contact sports such as rugby, etc. Rocky never went for a second opinion and yielded to his wife's wishes to stop. So with the advent of new research techniques into brain damage, Rocky was found to be normal among fighters, and he was suffering the results of a severe concussion. By today's standards Rocky Balboa would be given a clean bill of health for fighters.

=== Casting ===
Rocky Balboa gives nods to previous installments of the Rocky series via the casting. The most obvious is the return of Stallone, Burt Young and Tony Burton—the only actors to portray the same characters in all six installments. The character Marie appeared in the original Rocky; she was portrayed by Jodi Letizia. In this film, Marie is portrayed by Geraldine Hughes. Although Letizia did reprise the role for Rocky V, the sole scene in which she appeared was deleted. In it, Marie was homeless on the streets of Philadelphia.

Another recognizable character who appeared in the previous five films, sportscaster Stu Nahan, provided the commentary for the computer-generated fight between Mason Dixon and Balboa. Nahan was part of the ringside commentary team during all the bouts in the first three films and the Apollo Creed (Carl Weathers)-Ivan Drago (Dolph Lundgren) fight in Rocky IV. He was diagnosed with lymphoma during the Rocky Balboa filming, though, and died on December 26, 2007. James Binns, who previously appeared as Rocky's attorney in Rocky V, appears as a boxing commissioner in Rocky Balboa. Finally, Pedro Lovell, who portrayed Spider Rico in the original film, returns to the role in Rocky Balboa as a guest and later employee at Rocky's restaurant Adrian's.

Antonio Tarver's appearance in the film marks the sixth time an active professional boxer has appeared in the series; previous appearances include Joe Frazier and Pedro Lovell in Rocky (1976), Roberto Durán in Rocky II (1979), and Tommy Morrison and Michael Williams in Rocky V (1990). Stallone initially wanted Roy Jones Jr. to portray Dixon, but after Jones did not return Stallone's phone calls, he tapped Antonio Tarver to fill the role. Tarver accidentally knocked out Stallone during the filming of one of the segments of the fight.

A number of sports personalities portray themselves. Jim Lampley, Larry Merchant and Max Kellerman comprise the ringside broadcast team (all three are commentators for HBO Boxing). Sportswriters such as Bert Sugar, Bernard Fernandez and Steve Springer also appear. As for actual boxers, Mike Tyson (who had retired by the film's release) makes a cameo appearance, taunting Dixon as the fighter enters the ring. Lou DiBella, a real-life boxing promoter, portrays himself as Dixon's promoter. Several of ESPN's personalities also portray themselves. SportsCenter anchor Brian Kenny is the host of the fictional Then and Now series, while Cold Pizza and 1st and 10 hosts Jay Crawford, Dana Jacobson, Skip Bayless and Woody Paige also appear. Ring announcer Michael Buffer appeared as himself, as did referee Joe Cortez.

Regarding his decision not to have Talia Shire reprise her role as Adrian Pennino, Stallone told USA Today that, "in the original script, she was alive. But it just didn't have the same dramatic punch. I thought, 'What if she's gone?' That would cut Rocky's heart out and drop him down to ground zero." Shire herself said that, in her view, "The film has great regard for the process of mourning. Sly uses mourning to empower Rocky, and Adrian is made very mythical."

=== Filming ===
Principal photography began in December 2005 in Las Vegas, Nevada. In 2006, it moved to Los Angeles, California and Philadelphia, Pennsylvania. Scenes in Philadelphia were set in staples such as the Rocky Steps at the Philadelphia Museum of Art and South Philadelphia, while Center City was featured more prominently due to Rocky Balboa Jr. (Milo Ventimiglia)'s job as an accountant. The scene where Rocky and his son were talking while walking down a quiet block was filmed between 20th–21st Streets on Walnut, just after dawn on a Sunday morning. The production budget on the 38-day shoot was projected to be $23.5 million.

=== Cinematography and fight choreography ===
While the dramatic portions of the movie are shot in an obviously cinematic style, the bout between Balboa and Dixon is shot in a number of different ways. The lead-in to the bout, as well as the first two rounds, are shot in a style similar to a major pay-per-view broadcast. Clips from fights in previous Rocky movies are used during the introductory teaser to introduce Balboa, while stock footage from actual Tarver fights, as well as footage from Dixon's previous fight (shown at the beginning of the film) are used as clips for Dixon's part of the teaser. The fight itself was shot in High Definition to further enhance the TV-style look of the fight.

After the first two rounds, the bout is shot in a more "cinematic" style, reminiscent of the way the fights in the other Rocky films were shot. Unlike earlier films in the series, the fight is less choreographed and more improvised and is closer to an actual boxing match than a choreographed fight. This is a departure from the previous films, where every punch, feint, and step was carefully scripted and practiced.

According to the behind-the-scenes documentary portions of the film's DVD, there were slight continuity problems during the filming of the fight. This was said to have been due to the fact that real punches were thrown by both Stallone and Tarver, resulting in some swelling and nosebleeds earlier than scripted. The initial DVD release features an alternate ending as a separate bonus feature in which Rocky wins the fight.

== Music ==
=== Score ===
Composed by Bill Conti, the Rocky Balboa film score is both an updated composition of Rocky music and a tribute to the music that has been featured in previous Rocky films. Conti, who has acted as composer on every Rocky film except Rocky IV, chose to compose the score almost entirely from musical themes used in the previous movies. Only one original theme was written specifically for Rocky Balboa and that is the theme written to represent the character of Marie.

The roughly 40-minute score was recorded in the summer of 2006 at Capitol Studios in Hollywood, California. Conti chose to pre-record the string, brass and piano tracks and then have those tracks mixed with the work of a 44 piece orchestra which he conducted. He also performed all of the piano work himself which is something he has done with each movie for which he has composed the score. Stallone also was involved in every part of the process and attended several of the recording sessions.

In addition to the score, the film features original tracks performed by Natasha Bedingfield, Three 6 Mafia and Frank Stallone as well as classic tracks such as Frank Sinatra's "High Hopes" and The Miracles' "Ooo Baby Baby". Of the original tracks the most significant is the Diane Warren song "Still Here", performed by Bedingfield, which was reported to be the film's theme in early articles. Though it is still listed in the credits, the song was dropped from the film.

=== Soundtrack ===
On December 26, 2006, Capitol Records released a CD titled Rocky Balboa: The Best of Rocky which had a logo and cover art that was identical to the film's theatrical poster.

The CD itself contains short dialogue clips and musical tracks, some of which are remixes, from all the Rocky films. Only three of nineteen total tracks are from the Rocky Balboa film: two dialogue tracks and the Three 6 Mafia song "It's a Fight" (the UK version contains the additional track "Still Here" by Natasha Bedingfield).

Compositions by Rocky IV composer Vince DiCola are absent from the album, except for the song "Hearts on Fire" by John Cafferty, co-written by DiCola, Ed Fruge and Joe Esposito. DiCola is the only person, other than Bill Conti, to act as composer on a Rocky film and his work was used extensively on the 1991 compilation CD The Rocky Story: Songs from the Rocky Movies. The missing DiCola tracks are the only tracks on the 1991 CD that are not present on the new CD, which indicates an effort to use only Rocky Balboa composer Conti's tracks.

== Release ==
=== Distribution ===
Rocky Balboa represents a partnership between Metro-Goldwyn-Mayer, Columbia Pictures (Columbia's corporate parent Sony Pictures held a 20% stake in MGM), Revolution Studios, Chartoff Productions and Winkler Films. Since the Rocky series was originally produced and distributed by United Artists (now Amazon MGM Studios's subsidiary studio), the partners jointly decided that the film could and should take advantage of MGM's newly reinvigorated domestic distribution apparatus. 20th Century Fox handles its theatrical and home video distributions outside of the United States and Canada, while Sony Pictures Home Entertainment handled its American and Canadian video distributions. In the Philippines and Switzerland, Fox released the film through joint ventures with Warner Bros. Pictures. In Japan, the film was promoted by Fox as Rocky The Final. It opened across Japan on April 20, 2007.

=== Marketing ===
In late March 2006, the first movie teaser was released on the Internet. The full-length trailer accompanied the theatrical release of Pirates of the Caribbean: Dead Man's Chest on July 7 in select theaters.

=== Theatrical ===
The film was scheduled for release during the Presidents' Day holiday in 2007, but was moved up to right before Christmas 2006.

=== Director's Cut ===
In 2024, Stallone did some minor recuts to the film, but unlike his significant re-editing of Rocky IV, this director's cut is much more conventional. It simply edits in most of the deleted scenes (included as a bonus feature on the prior Blu-ray disc). The director's cut features newly-completed versions of these scenes to match the quality of the theatrical footage. The only scenes not included in the director's cut are "Paulie's Girlfriend Moves His Things" and the alternate ending, which are still included as deleted scenes on the Ultra HD Blu-ray release. The director's cut runs a total of 116 minutes, 14 minutes longer than the theatrical version.

=== Home media ===
Rocky Balboa was released in three formats: Blu-ray, DVD and UMD. It was released in Region 1 on March 20 and Region 2 on May 21, 2007. The film has made $35,622,998 in DVD sales. Features on the Blu-ray Disc and DVD include deleted scenes along with an alternate ending (where Rocky wins the split decision), bloopers, a commentary and several featurettes. The Blu-ray version features all of the DVD's content in 1080p high definition video. In July 2024, the movie got a 4K UHD release, featuring the theatrical and director's cut versions of the film, carrying over most of the bonus features from the 2007 Blu-ray disc.

== Reception ==
=== Box office ===
The film was an unexpected box office success and exceeded studio expectations grossing over three times the opening night estimates of (at best) $2,000,000 and doing so despite a harsh spell of winter weather. The film finished third in its opening weekend, grossing $12,540,000, and eventually became Stallone's most successful starring role since 1993's Cliffhanger and the sixth highest grossing boxing film of all time, topped only by the first Rocky through Rocky IV and Clint Eastwood's Million Dollar Baby. Total U.S. box office gross receipts were $70,269,899 while the international gross stands at $85,959,151 making for a total worldwide gross of $156,229,050.

=== Critical response ===
On Rotten Tomatoes, the film had a score of 78% based on a sample of 184 reviews, with an average rating of 6/10. The site's consensus read, "Implausible but entertaining and poignant, Rocky Balboa finds the champ in fighting form for the first time in years." On Metacritic it had a weighted average score of 63 out of 100 based on 36 reviews, indicating "generally favorable reviews". Audiences surveyed by CinemaScore gave the film a grade "B+" on a scale of "A+" to "F".

On the television show Ebert & Roeper, both Richard Roeper and guest reviewer Aisha Tyler gave the film a "thumbs up" rating. Among other positive reviews were from Variety, David Edelstein of New York Magazine, Ethan Alter of Premiere, Victoria Alexander of Filmsinreview.com, Jeanne Aufmuth of Palo Alto Weekly, Brett Buckalew of Filmstew.com, The Hollywood Reporter and Owen Gleiberman of Entertainment Weekly.

Some criticism came from Christy Lemire, who described the film as self-parody. Kenneth Turan of the Los Angeles Times criticized the film's premise as implausible and derivative, and the plot development as cursory. Colm Andrew of the Manx Independent said the film "captures the look and feel of the first Rocky but becomes too much of a sentimental homage" and overall "there is little point in joining Stallone on this ultimately dull nostalgia trip".

Stallone said he knew he would face skepticism about his plan to make a sixth Rocky film, but he cited a line from the script, spoken by the Rocky character, that helped to explain his decision to go ahead: "I'd rather do something I love badly than to feel bad about not doing something I love."

The film was greeted warmly by the majority of the boxing community, with many experts believing the Rocky character is still a key symbol of the sport and that the boxing scenes were the most realistic of any film. On the DVD, Stallone attributes this to the fact that he used realistic sound-effects (the previous installments had become notorious for their unrealistic and loud sounds of punches landing) and the fact that both Stallone and Tarver threw real punches at each other.

== Franchise ==
=== Possible sequel ===
In May 2019 at the Cannes Film Festival, Sylvester Stallone said that he had another story about Rocky Balboa. By July, Stallone confirmed that a sequel film series was in development. The project will be a joint-production venture between Winkler Films Production and MGM. Stallone will serve as writer in addition to starring in the film. Conceptualized as an epilogue story, the film is said to be about Rocky befriending a young fighter who is a foreigner, stuck illegally in the United States. Stallone states: "Rocky meets a young, angry person who got stuck in this country when he comes to see his sister. He takes him into his life, and unbelievable adventures begin, and they wind up south of the border. It's very, very timely".

In May 2020, Stallone said that he was still working on the film, though it had not yet been officially green-lit by the studio. In November 2021, Stallone expressed doubt about the film being greenlit, due to his increasingly sour relationship with Irwin Winkler. In November 2022, Stallone confirmed that the studio wants another Rocky film, but that negotiations to attain part of the rights to the character from the producers stalled development. He further stated that he is writing the script and that if the studio likes his work, the film will be made.

=== Spin-off ===
In 2015, Rocky Balboa was followed by a spin-off titled Creed, taking place nine years after the events in Rocky Balboa.

== Video game ==
In December 2006, Ubisoft and MGM announced that a new Rocky video game, titled Rocky Balboa, was being made exclusively for the PlayStation Portable handheld console. It was released on March 20, 2007, to coincide with the Blu-ray and DVD release.

== See also ==
- List of boxing films
