= Heart's on Fire (John Cafferty song) =

Single by John Cafferty

from the album Rocky IV
- Released: March 1986
- Recorded: 1985
- Genre: Rock
- Length: 4:17
- Label: Scotti Bros.
- Songwriters: Vince DiCola, Ed Fruge, Joe Esposito
- Producers: Vince DiCola, Ed Fruge

John Cafferty & The Beaver Brown Band singles chronology
"Voice of America's Sons" (1986)	"Heart's on Fire" (1986)	"Song and Dance" (1988)

Audio sample
- file; help

"Heart's on Fire" is a song by American rock singer John Cafferty. It was released in February 1986 as a single from the soundtrack to the 1985 film Rocky IV. The power ballad peaked at number 76 on the Billboard Hot 100 chart. It was written by Vince DiCola, Ed Fruge, and Joe Esposito.

== Critical reception ==
Nancy Ehrlich of Billboard magazine reviewed called the song "high-adrenaline rock'n'roll over pummeling percussion."

== Personnel ==
- John Cafferty – vocals and guitar
- Gary Gramolini – lead guitar
- Pat Lupo – bass
- Kenny Jo Silva – drums
- Bobby Cotoia – keyboards
- Michael "Tunes" Antunes – saxophone
- Vince Dicola – keyboard

== Charts ==
Chart (1986–1987)	Peak position
Canada Top Singles (RPM)	68
US Billboard Hot 100	76

== Certifications ==
Region	Certification	Certified units/sales
United Kingdom (BPI)	Silver	200,000^{‡}
^{‡} Sales+streaming figures based on certification alone.
