= Sylvester Stallone filmography =

List of films featuring Sylvester Stallone

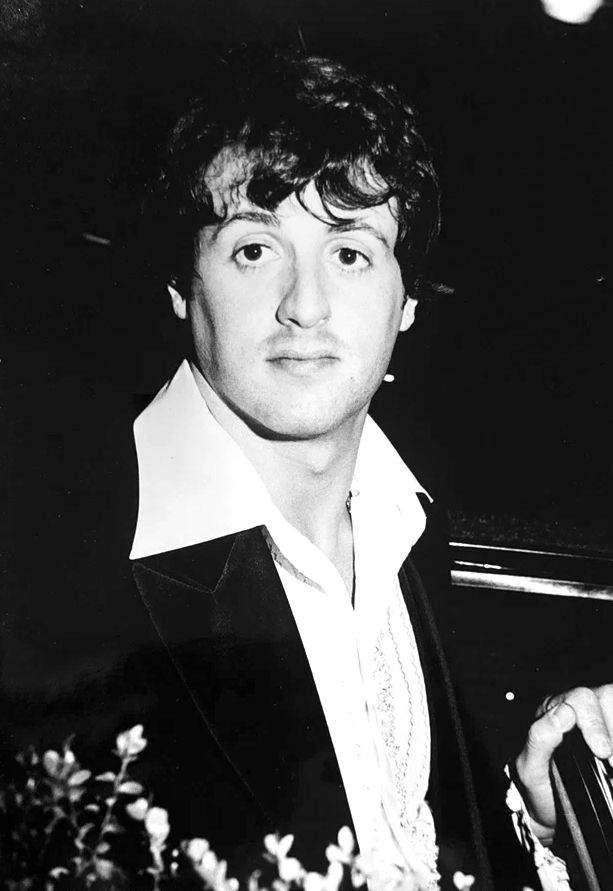
Stallone at the 49th Academy Awards in 1977

American actor and filmmaker Sylvester Stallone has appeared in over 82 films. This is a list of his acting roles as well as directing, screenwriting, producing credits.

== Film ==
Year	Title	Role	Notes	Ref.
1969	The Square Root	Unknown	Uncredited extra	
1969	Downhill Racer	Restaurant Patron	Uncredited extra	
1970	M*A*S*H	Soldier Sitting at Camp Table	Uncredited extra	
1970	The Party at Kitty and Stud's	Stud		
1970	Lovers and Other Strangers	Groomsman	Uncredited extra	
1970	The Sidelong Glances of a Pigeon Kicker	Party Guest	Uncredited extra	
1971	Bananas	Subway Thug #1	Uncredited extra	
1971	Klute	Club Patron	Uncredited extra	
1972	What's Up, Doc?	Hotel Guest	Uncredited extra	
1973	No Place to Hide	Jerry Savage		
1974	The Lords of Flatbush	Stanley Rosiello	Also additional dialogue	
1975	The Prisoner of Second Avenue	Youth in Park		
1975	Capone	Frank Ralph "The Enforcer" Nitti		
1975	Death Race 2000	Joe "Machine Gun" Viterbo		
1975	Mandingo	Lynching Witness	Uncredited extra	
1975	Farewell, My Lovely	Jonnie		
1976	Cannonball	Mafioso #2	Uncredited cameo	
1976	Rocky	Robert "Rocky" Balboa	Also writer and boxing choreographer	
1978	F.I.S.T.	Johnny Kovak	Also writer	
1978	Paradise Alley	Cosmo Carboni	Also director and writer	
1979	Rocky II	Robert "Rocky" Balboa	Also director, writer and boxing choreographer	
1981	Nighthawks	Sergeant Deke DaSilva		
1981	Escape to Victory	Captain Robert Hatch		
1982	Rocky III	Robert "Rocky" Balboa	Also director, writer and boxing choreographer	
1982	First Blood	John J. Rambo	Also writer	
1983	Staying Alive	Man on Street	Also director, writer and producer, uncredited cameo	
1984	Rhinestone	Nick Martinelli	Also writer	
1985	Rambo: First Blood Part II	John J. Rambo	Also writer	
1985	Rocky IV	Robert "Rocky" Balboa	Also director, writer and boxing choreographer	
1986	Cobra	Lieutenant Marion "Cobra" Cobretti	Also writer	
1987	Over the Top	Lincoln "Linc" Hawk	Also writer	
1988	Rambo III	John J. Rambo	Also writer	
1989	Lock Up	Frank Leone		
1989	Tango & Cash	Lieutenant Raymond "Ray" Tango		
1990	Rocky V	Robert "Rocky" Balboa	Also writer	
1991	Oscar	Angelo "Snaps" Provolone		
1992	Stop! Or My Mom Will Shoot	Sergeant Joseph Andrew "Joe" Bomowski		
1993	Cliffhanger	Ranger Gabriel "Gabe" Walker	Also writer	
1993	Demolition Man	Sergeant John Spartan		
1994	The Specialist	Captain Ray Quick		
1995	Your Studio and You	Himself	Short film, uncredited cameo	
1995	Judge Dredd	Judge Joseph Dredd		
1995	Assassins	Robert Rath / Joseph Rath		
1996	Daylight	Chief Kit Latura		
1997	Cop Land	Sheriff Freddy Heflin		
1997	An Alan Smithee Film: Burn Hollywood Burn	Himself	Cameo	
1997	The Good Life	Boss	Unreleased, cameo	
1998	Antz	Corporal Weaver	Voice role	
2000	Get Carter	Jack Carter		
2001	Driven	Joe "The Hummer" Tanto	Also writer and producer	
2002	D-Tox	Agent Jake Malloy		
2002	Avenging Angelo	Frankie Delano	Direct-to-video	
2003	Taxi 3	Passenger to Airport	Uncredited cameo	
2003	Shade	Dean "The Dean" Stevens		
2003	Spy Kids 3-D: Game Over	Agent Sebastian "The Toymaker"		
2006	Rocky Balboa	Robert "Rocky" Balboa	Also director, writer and boxing choreographer	
2008	Rambo	John J. Rambo	Also director and writer	
2009	Kambakkht Ishq	Himself	Cameo	
2010	The Expendables	Barney Ross	Also director and writer	
2011	Zookeeper	Joe the Lion	Voice role	
2012	The Expendables 2	Barney Ross	Also writer	
2012	Bullet to the Head	James "Jimmy Bobo" Bonomo		
2013	Escape Plan	Ray Breslin / Anthony Portos		
2013	Homefront	None	Writer and producer only	
2013	Grudge Match	Henry "Razor" Sharp	Also boxing choreographer	
2014	The Expendables 3	Barney Ross	Also writer	
2014	Reach Me	Chief Gerald Cavallo		
2015	Creed	Robert "Rocky" Balboa	Also producer	
2016	Ratchet & Clank	Lieutenant Victor Von Ion	Voice role	
2017	Guardians of the Galaxy Vol. 2	Stakar Ogord		
2017	Animal Crackers	Bulletman	Voice role	
2018	Escape Plan 2: Hades	Ray Breslin	Direct-to-video	
2018	Creed II	Robert "Rocky" Balboa	Also writer and producer	
2018	Backtrace	Detective Sykes		
2019	Escape Plan: The Extractors	Ray Breslin	Direct-to-video	
2019	Rallying Cry	Jasper Reese	Short film	
2019	Rambo: Last Blood	John J. Rambo	Also writer	
2019	One Night: Joshua vs. Ruiz	Himself	Documentary film, also executive producer	
2021	The Suicide Squad	Nanaue / King Shark	Voice role	
2021	The Making of Rocky vs. Drago by Sylvester Stallone	Himself	Documentary film, also producer	
2022	Samaritan	Joe Smith / Samaritan / Nemesis	Also producer	
2022	MVP	None	Executive producer only	
2023	Creed III	None	Producer only	
2023	Guardians of the Galaxy Vol. 3	Stakar Ogord		
2023	Expend4bles	Barney Ross		
2023	Sly	Himself	Documentary film, also executive producer	
2024	Lost on a Mountain in Maine	None	Producer only	
2024	Armor	Rook		
2025	Alarum	Agent Chester		
2025	A Working Man	None	Writer and producer only	
2025	Giant	None	Executive producer only	
2027	John Rambo	None	Executive producer only	
TBA	Untitled Mike Thornton biopic film	None	Producer only	

== Television ==
Year	Title	Role	Notes	Ref.
1973	The Evil Touch	None	Episode: "Heart to Heart"; writer only	
1975	Police Story	Elmore "Rocky" Caddo	Episode: "The Cutting Edge"	
1975	Kojak	Detective Rick Daly	Episode: "My Brother, My Enemy"	
1979	The Muppet Show	Himself	Episode: "Sylvester Stallone"	
1985	Heart of a Champion: The Ray Mancini Story	None	Television film; executive producer only	
1991	Dream On	Himself	Episode: "The Second Greatest Story Ever Told: Parts 1 & 2"	
1997	Saturday Night Live	Himself (host)	Episode: "Sylvester Stallone/Jamiroquai"	
2002	Father Lefty	None	Unsold television pilot; writer and executive producer only	
2002	Liberty's Kids	Paul Revere	Voice; Episode: "Midnight Ride"	
2005	Las Vegas	Frank "The Repairman"	2 episodes	
2005	The Contender Rematch: Mora vs. Manfredo	None	Television special; executive producer only	
2006–2009	The Contender	Himself (host)	16 episodes; also executive producer	
2010	Inferno: The Making of 'The Expendables'	Himself	Television documentary film; also producer	
2013	Saturday Night Live	Three Wise Guys	Episode: "John Goodman/Kings of Leon"; uncredited cameo	
2016	Strong	None	Executive producer only	
2017	Ultimate Beastmaster	None	Creator and producer only	
2017	This Is Us	Himself	Episode: "Déjà Vu"	
2022–present	Tulsa King	Dwight "The General" Manfredi	29 episodes; also executive producer and writer for 6 episodes	
2023–2024	The Family Stallone	Himself	Reality series; also executive producer	
2025–2026	Extracted	None	Executive producer only	
2027	Frisco King	Dwight "The General" Manfredi	Also executive producer; filming	

== Theatre ==
Year	Title	Role	Venue	Notes	Ref.
1970	Score	Telephone Repairman Mike	Martinique Theater		

== Commercial ==
Year	Title	Role	Notes	Ref.
2020	Facebook: Groups - Ready to Rock? - 2020 Super Bowl Commercial	Robert "Rocky" Balboa	Cameo	

== Music video ==
Year	Title	Role	Performer	Notes	Ref.
1987	"Winner Takes It All"	Lincoln "Linc" Hawk	Sammy Hagar	Uncredited cameo	

== Soundtrack appearances ==
Year	Title	Song	Notes	Ref.
1978	Paradise Alley	"Too Close to Paradise"		
1979	The Muppet Show	"Let's Call the Whole Thing Off", "A Bird in a Gilded Cage"	Episode: "Sylvester Stallone"; uncredited	
1982	Rocky III	"Take You Back"	Uncredited	
1984	Rhinestone	"Stay Out of My Bedroom", "Woke Up in Love", "Drinkinstein", "Sweet Lovin' Friends", "Be There"		
2013	Grudge Match	"The Star-Spangled Banner"		

== Video games ==
Year	Title	Role	Notes	Ref.
1994	Demolition Man	Sergeant John Spartan	Live action full-motion video; 3DO version only	
2014	Rambo: The Video Game	John J. Rambo	Archive audio and likeness	
2020	Mortal Kombat 11	John J. Rambo	Downloadable content; voice and likeness	
2021	Call of Duty: Black Ops Cold War	John J. Rambo	Archive audio and likeness	
2021	Call of Duty: Warzone	John J. Rambo	Archive audio and likeness	

== See also ==
- List of awards and nominations received by Sylvester Stallone
- Sylvester Stallone's unrealized projects
