= Sylvester Stallone's unrealized projects =

During his extensive career, American filmmaker Sylvester Stallone has worked on several projects which never progressed beyond the pre-production stage under his direction. Some of these projects fell in development hell, were officially canceled, were in development limbo or would see life under a different production team.

== As director ==
=== Poe ===
On December 1, 1976, Stallone was set to direct, write, and star in his passion project, a biopic about the artistic-driven, non-alcoholic poet Edgar Allan Poe, which he and his then-wife Sasha Czack had a costume photo shoot in a Bloomingdales, and never got traction by studios, in the early 2000s, Stallone revealed that he would direct from his latest draft of the screenplay with Robert Downey Jr. to portray Poe, as well as a possible young actor could portray Poe and near-annual script revision by Stallone himself.

=== Rampart Scandal ===
On June 5, 2003, Stallone was set to direct and starring in ”Rampart Scandal,” a Rashomon-like police drama about the investigation of the murders of Tupac Shakur and The Notorious B.I.G., with Stallone writing the script based on Randall Sullivan’s fictional novel “LAbyrinth,” Suge Knight was in talks to play himself, Jeff Wald and Mark Skelly are attached to produce the film for Franchise Pictures. The movie was canceled due to Franchise Pictures’ bankruptcy filing and Stallone's possible awareness of Elie Samaha’s fraudulent production financing, and the novel “Labyrinth“ was eventually adapted into the film City of Lies with Johnny Depp as Poole.

=== Tough as They Come film ===
On January 3, 2017, Stallone was set to direct and star in the feature film adaptation of Travis Mills’ memoir Tough as They Come, with Adam Driver attached to portray Mills and Craig Buck, Susan Carlson, Eric Carlson and James Keach will produce the film for 20th Century Fox.

=== Creed 2 ===
On October 10, 2017, Stallone was reportedly going to direct Creed II attached to star in and will produce the series with his manager Craig Baumgarten, Sanzel, Tony Krantz, Braden Aftergood with a bidding war for a broadcaster, until December 11, 2017, Steven Caple Jr. was set to direct because of Stallone's decision to give the directing reins to other directors, which MGM supported.

=== The Tenderloin TV series ===
On March 27, 2019, Stallone was set to direct and executive produce The Tenderloin, the television series about Charles Becker, the one and only policeman executed for murder, with Stephen Kay writing the pilot episode and produce the series in collaboration with Barry Jossen at A+E Studios, & Braden Aftergood at Balboa Productions for History Channel to broadcast.

=== The International TV series ===
On August 3, 2019, Stallone was in talks to direct and produce Ken Sanzel's action-drama television series The International, with Dolph Lundgren attached to star in and will produce the series with his manager Craig Baumgarten, Sanzel, Tony Krantz, Braden Aftergood with a bidding war for a broadcaster, which on October 3, 2019, CBS won the bidding war for The International, with Stallone was confirmed to direct the pilot episode.

== As producer ==
=== One Free Murder ===
On December 18, 1996, Stallone was set to develop (produce) One Free Murder, a crime movie loosely about mobster Michael Franzese, with Rory O’Connor and Jack Newfield writing the screenplay under Nicholas Pileggi’s supervision, for Universal Pictures to distribute.

=== Lefty TV series ===
On March 18, 2002, Stallone was set to executive produce Cynthia Cidre’s drama television series Father Lefty, with Danny Nucci, Viola Davis, David Hewlett, and Marin Hinkle attached as the main cast of the show, Kevin Rodney Sullivan was set to direct the pilot episode, Brad Grey will produce the series in collaboration with Big Ticket Television for CBS broadcast the series.

=== Rambo TV series ===
On August 21, 2013, Stallone was set to executive produce a John Rambo television series with Entertainment One producing the series with Nu Image’s Avi Lerner. On December 1, 2015, Jeb Stuart was set to write executive produce the Rambo television series about Rambo’s relationship with his son J.R., with Stallone possibly starring and executive producing the series with Entertainment One’s Carrie Stern & Nu Image’s Avi Lerner, and FOX set to broadcast the hour-long drama series.

=== Omertà TV series ===
On April 28, 2016, Stallone was set to executive produce and star in the television series adaptation of Mario Puzo’s novel Omertà, with Justin Herber and Adam Hoff writing the show bible, Antoine Fuqua was set to direct and produce the series in collaboration with David Glasser and Megan Spanjian at The Weinstein Company, and Braden Aftergood at Balboa Productions before a network will distribute.

=== untitled Jack Johnson biopic ===
On May 30, 2018, Stallone was set to produce a biopic about Jack Johnson with Stallone’s Balboa Productions partner Braden Aftergood producing and Starlight Cultural Entertainment set to finance the movie, and MGM was set to distribute. On July 23, 2019, Antoine Fuqua was confirmed to direct the biopic with Stallone writing the screenplay.

=== Hunter feature film ===
On October 17, 2018, Stallone was set to executive produce the feature film adaptation of James Byron Huggins’ novel Hunter, with Braden Aftergood producing through Balboa Productions and Starlight Cultural Entertainment set to finance the movie.

=== Ghost feature film ===
On October 17, 2018, Stallone was set to executive produce the feature film adaptation of Michael McGowan and Ralph Pezzullo's memoir Ghost, with Braden Aftergood producing through Balboa Productions and Starlight Cultural Entertainment set to finance the movie.

=== Max Adam’s Special Operations feature film ===
On October 17, 2018, Stallone was set to executive produce a screenplay about US Special Operations from retired Army ranger Max Adams, with Braden Aftergood producing through Balboa Productions and Starlight Cultural Entertainment set to finance the movie.

=== Levon Cade TV series ===
On October 17, 2018, Stallone was set to executive produce the television series adaptation of Chuck Dixon’s Levon Cade book series, with Braden Aftergood producing through Balboa Productions and Starlight Cultural Entertainment set to finance the television series. The project eventually became A Working Man.

=== The Second Son TV series ===
On October 17, 2018, Stallone was set to executive produce the television series adaptation of Charles Sailor's novel The Second Son, with Rob Williams set to write the series, Braden Aftergood producing through Balboa Productions and Starlight Cultural Entertainment set to finance the television series.

=== Arcane ===
On July 23, 2019, Stallone was set to produce Corin Hardy's monster movie Arcane through Balboa Productions.

=== The Bellhop ===
On July 23, 2019, Stallone was set to produce The Bellhop, with Iko Uwais set to star.

=== Little America ===
In February 2020, Stallone was set to produce Rowan Athale's dystopian action thriller Little America with Stallone set to star in the movie, Michael Bay and AGC Studios will produce after making sales at the European Film Market to distributors instead of Universal, and scheduled to begin production in California, but COVID-19 likely canceled filming. On October 18, 2021, Stallone was still involved with Little America.

=== Meshed TV series adaptation ===
On December 1, 2020, Stallone was set to executive produce the television series adaptation of Rich Larson’s short story Meshed, with Edward Ricourt writing the series about a not-so-distant future centered around a technology which allows for an immersive experience of professional basketball through the eyes of its athletes, enhancing the game for viewers while commoditizing the lives of its players, with Braden Aftergood producing for Dust.

=== Scavenger Hunt ===
On April 12, 2023, Stallone was set to executive produce and star in Elle Callahan’s movie “Scavenger Hunt” with Balboa Productions producing, and Amazon would distribute.

=== Never Too Old to Die ===
On April 17, 2023, Stallone was set to executive produce and star in the action comedy movie “Never Too Old to Die,” with Brian Otting writing the screenplay, Balboa Productions producing, and Amazon would distribute.

=== My Masterpiece ===
On May 19, 2023, Stallone was set to executive produce the action movie “My Masterpiece,” with Cassandra Brooksbank set to make her feature directorial debut from Jason Hellerman's screenplay, Maria Bakalova starring, Braden Aftergood producing, and The Veterans and CAA Media Finance selling the movie at the Cannes Film Festival.
