= 40th Golden Raspberry Awards =

Award ceremony presented by the Golden Raspberry Award Foundation in 2019

- Awarded for: Worst in film
- Date: Cancelled (originally March 14, 2020) (Online version on March 16, 2020)
- Site: Los Angeles, California

Highlights
- Worst Picture: Cats
- Most awards: Cats (6)
- Most nominations: Cats (9)

The 40th Golden Raspberry Awards, or Razzies, was an awards ceremony that identified the worst the film industry had to offer in 2019, according to votes from members of the Golden Raspberry Foundation. Razzies co-founder John J. B. Wilson has stated that the intent of the awards is "to be funny." The nominees were announced on February 8, 2020, one day prior to the 92nd Academy Awards. The ceremony, the date of which was later announced to be March 14, 2020, was ultimately cancelled amid the concerns over the COVID-19 pandemic. The organizers announced the ceremony's winners online on March 16, 2020. No nominees were announced for the "Worst of the Decade Awards", despite being the tradition for the final ceremony of the decade. In contrast, Toy Story 4 became the first Pixar film and the second animated film to be nominated for a Razzie Redeemer Award.

== Winners and nominees ==
The nominations were announced on February 8, 2020.

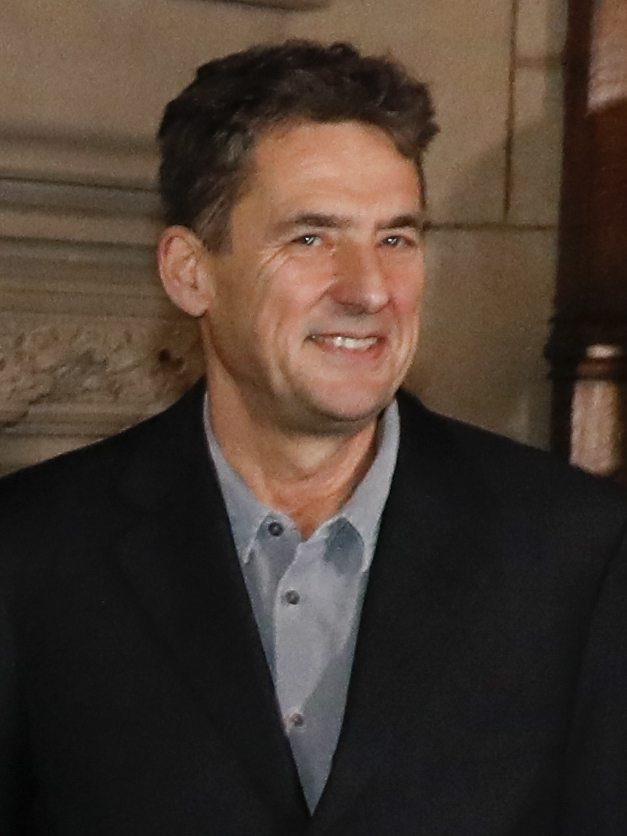
Tim Bevan, Worst Picture co-winner

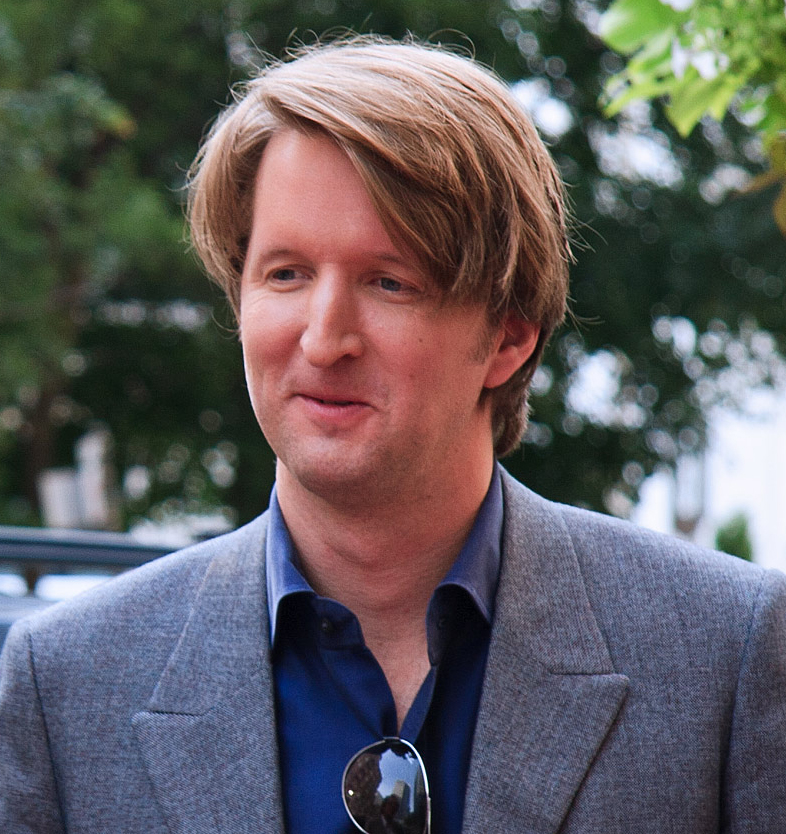
Tom Hooper, Worst Picture co-winner, Worst Director winner and Worst Screenplay co-winner

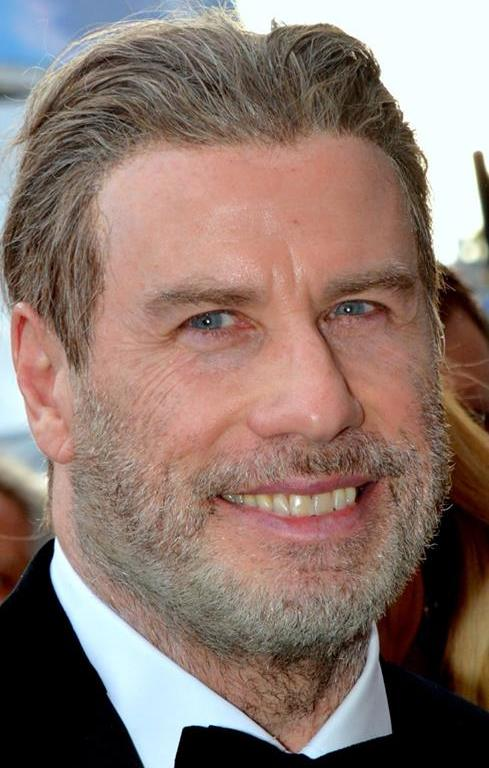
John Travolta, Worst Actor winner

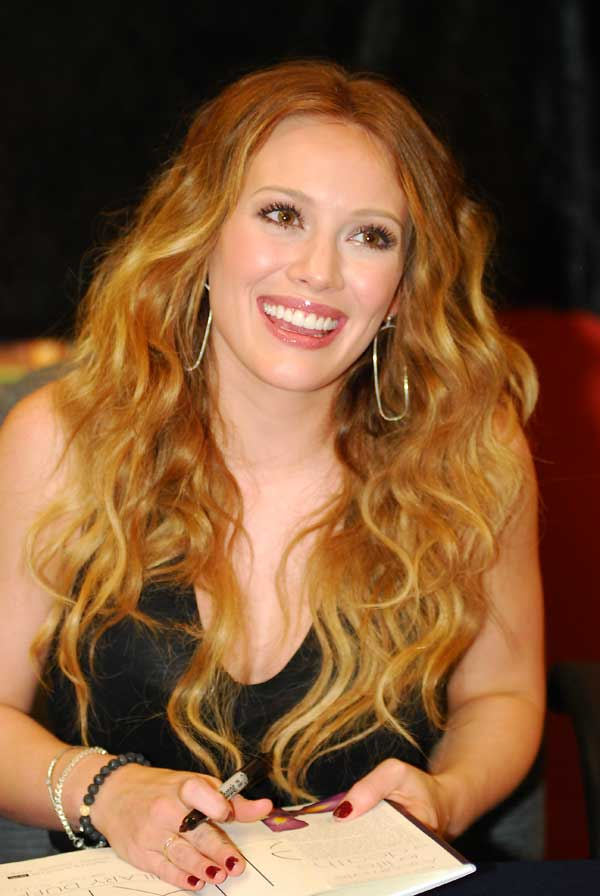
Hilary Duff, Worst Actress winner

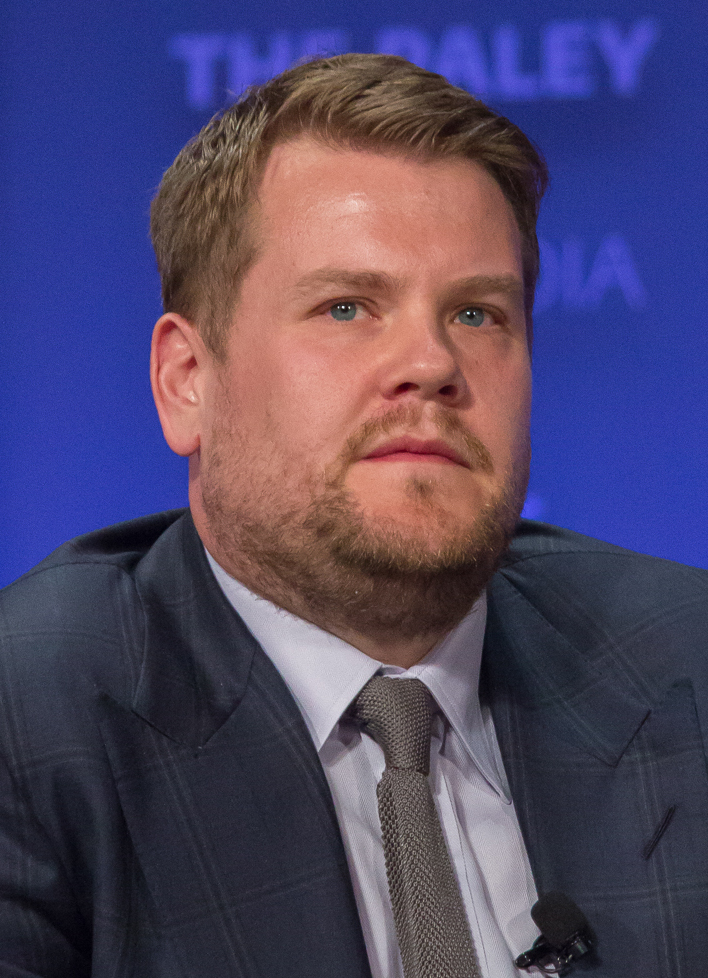
James Corden, Worst Supporting Actor winner

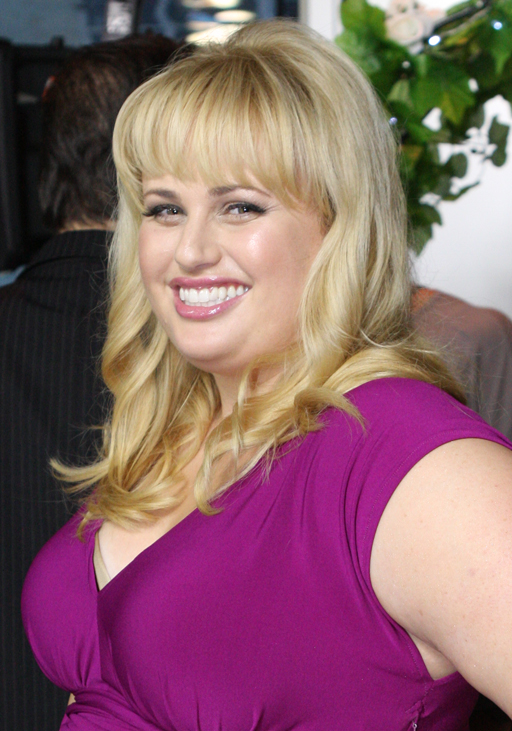
Rebel Wilson, Worst Supporting Actress winner

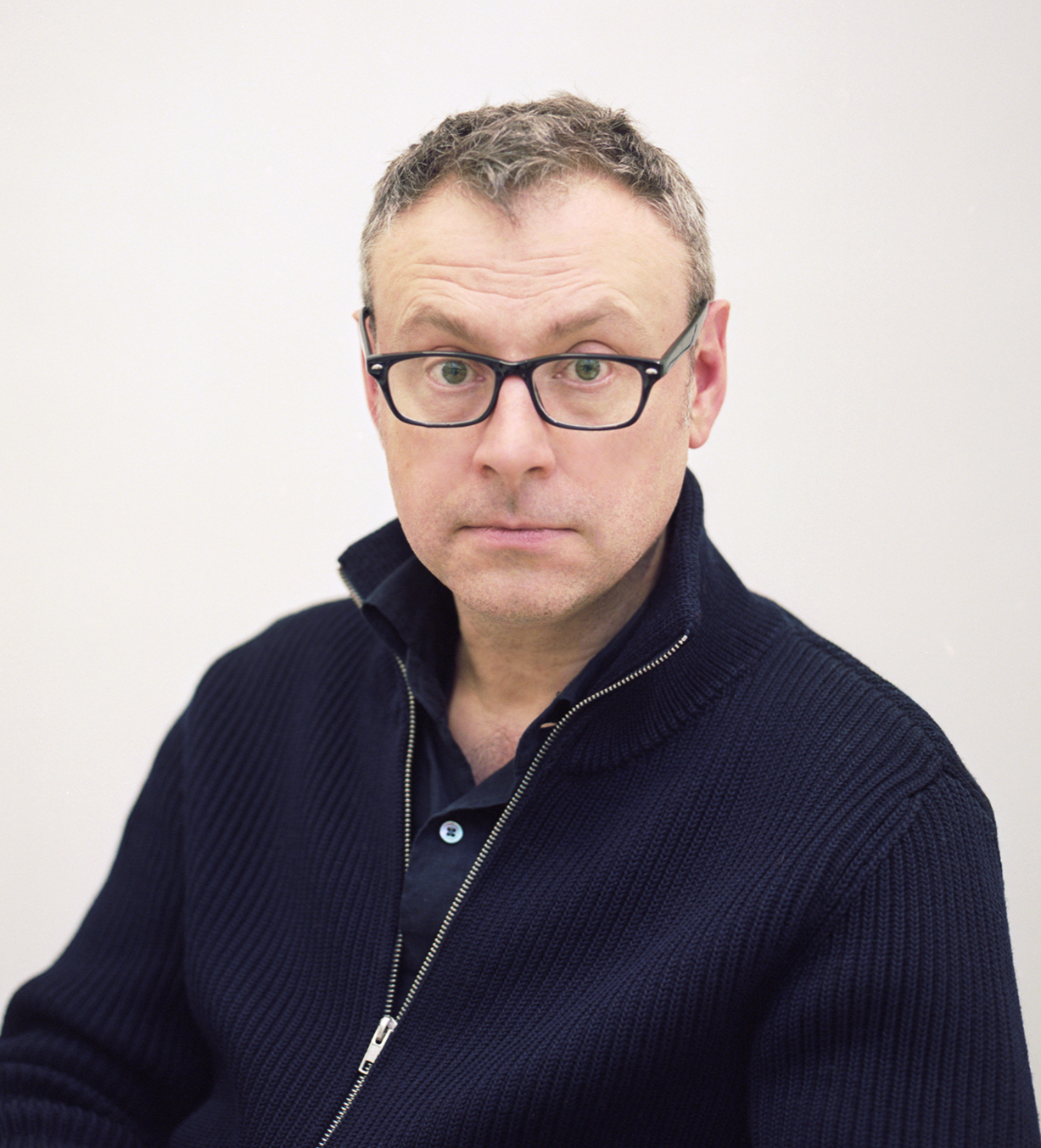
Lee Hall, Worst Screenplay co-winner

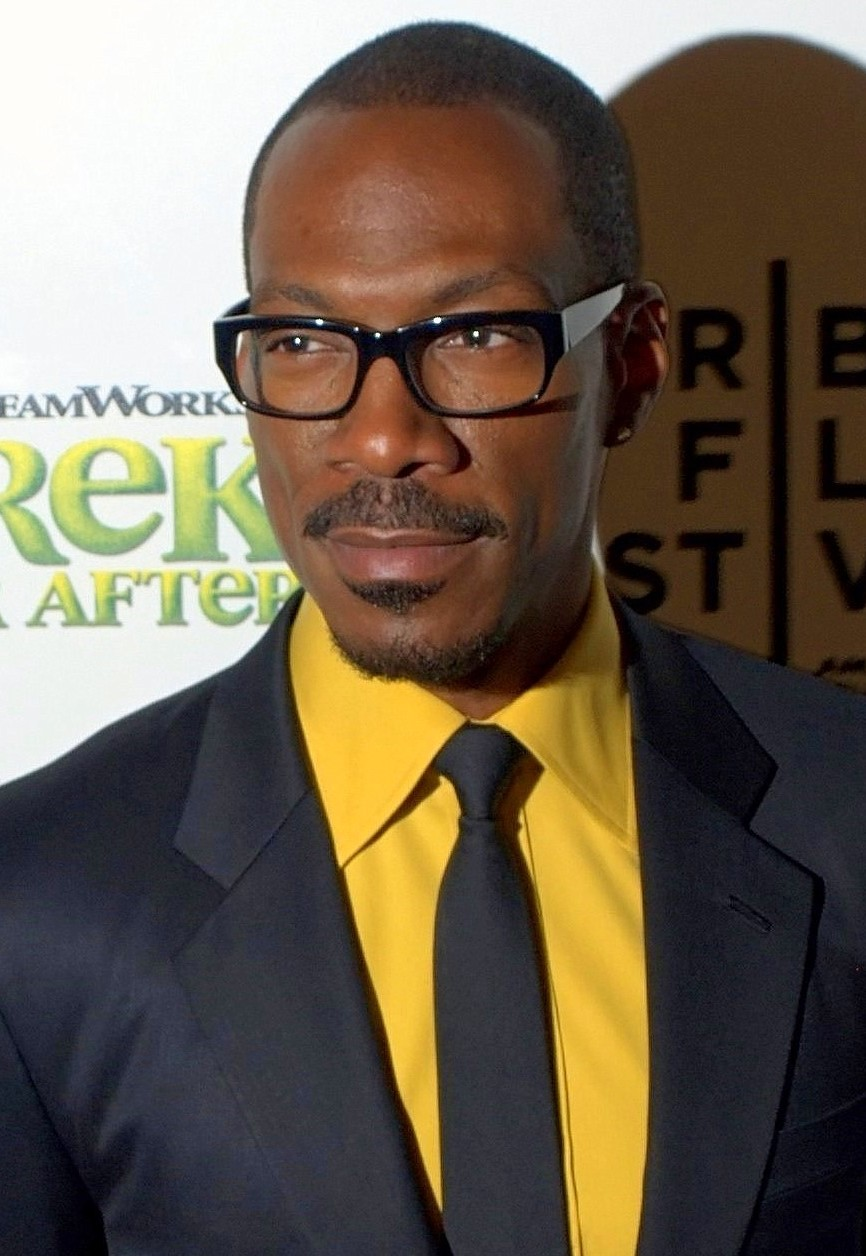
Eddie Murphy, Razzie Redeemer Award winner

40th Golden Raspberry Award nominees
Worst Picture: Cats (Universal) – Debra Hayward, Tim Bevan, Eric Fellner, Tom Hooper; The Fanatic (Quiver) – Daniel Grodnik, Oscar Generale, Bill Kenwright; The Haunting of Sharon Tate (Saban) – Lucas Jarach, Daniel Farrands, Eric Brenner; A Madea Family Funeral (Lionsgate) – Ozzie Areu, Will Areu, Mark E. Swinton; Rambo: Last Blood (Lionsgate) – Avi Lerner, Kevin King Templeton, Yariv Lerner, Les Weldon	Worst Director: Tom Hooper – Cats; Fred Durst – The Fanatic; James Franco – Zeroville; Adrian Grünberg – Rambo: Last Blood; Neil Marshall – Hellboy (Note: Referred to as Hellboy 2019 on the official nomination list.)
Worst Actor: John Travolta – The Fanatic and Trading Paint as Moose and Sam Munroe (respectively); James Franco – Zeroville as Vikar; David Harbour – Hellboy as Hellboy / Anung Un Rama; Matthew McConaughey – Serenity as Baker Dill; Sylvester Stallone – Rambo: Last Blood as John J. Rambo	Worst Actress: Hilary Duff – The Haunting of Sharon Tate as Sharon Tate; Anne Hathaway – The Hustle and Serenity as Josephine Chesterfield and Karen Zariakas (respectively); Francesca Hayward – Cats as Victoria; Tyler Perry – A Madea Family Funeral as Mabel "Madea" Simmons; Rebel Wilson – The Hustle as Penny Rust
Worst Supporting Actor: James Corden – Cats as Bustopher Jones; Tyler Perry – A Madea Family Funeral as Joe; Tyler Perry – A Madea Family Funeral as Uncle Heathrow; Seth Rogen – Zeroville as Viking Man; Bruce Willis – Glass as David Dunn / The Overseer	Worst Supporting Actress: Rebel Wilson – Cats as Jennyanydots; Jessica Chastain – Dark Phoenix as Vuk; Cassi Davis – A Madea Family Funeral as Aunt Bam; Judi Dench – Cats as Old Deuteronomy; Fenessa Pineda – Rambo: Last Blood as Gizelle
Worst Screen Combo: Any two half-feline/half-human hairballs – Cats; Jason Derulo and his CGI-neutered "bulge" – Cats; Tyler Perry and Tyler Perry (or Tyler Perry) – A Madea Family Funeral; Sylvester Stallone and his impotent rage – Rambo: Last Blood; John Travolta and any screenplay he accepts	Worst Remake, Rip-off or Sequel: Rambo: Last Blood (Lionsgate); Dark Phoenix (Fox); Godzilla: King of the Monsters (Warner Bros.); Hellboy (Lionsgate); A Madea Family Funeral (Lionsgate)
Worst Screenplay: Cats – Lee Hall and Tom Hooper; based on the musical by Andrew Lloyd Webber, which was based on Old Possum's Book of Practical Cats by T. S. Eliot; The Haunting of Sharon Tate – Daniel Farrands; Hellboy – Andrew Cosby; based on the Dark Horse Comics character by Mike Mignola; A Madea Family Funeral – Tyler Perry; Rambo: Last Blood – Matthew Cirulnick and Sylvester Stallone; based on the character created by David Morrell	Razzie Redeemer Award: Eddie Murphy – from previously proclaimed Worst Actor of the Decade at the 30th Golden Raspberry Awards in 2010 to Dolemite Is My Name; Jennifer Lopez – From 10-time Razzie nominee (including for Worst Actress of the Decade in 2010), 2-time winner to Hustlers; Keanu Reeves – From 6-time Razzie nominee to John Wick: Chapter 3 – Parabellum and Toy Story 4; Adam Sandler – From 9-time Razzie winner, including for Worst Actor two consecutive years to Uncut Gems; Will Smith – From 4-time Razzie winner to Aladdin
Worst Reckless Disregard for Human Life and Public Property: Rambo: Last Blood (Lionsgate); Dragged Across Concrete (Summit); The Haunting of Sharon Tate (Saban); Hellboy (Lionsgate); Joker (Warner Bros.)

== Films with multiple wins and nominations ==
The following ten films received multiple nominations:

Films with multiple nominations at the 40th Golden Raspberry Awards
Nominations	Film
9	Cats
8	A Madea Family Funeral
8	Rambo: Last Blood
5	Hellboy
4	The Haunting of Sharon Tate
3	The Fanatic
3	Zeroville
2	Dark Phoenix
2	The Hustle
2	Serenity

The following films received multiple wins:

Films with multiple wins at the 40th Golden Raspberry Awards
Wins	Film
6	Cats
2	Rambo: Last Blood

== Criticism ==
The Worst Reckless Disregard for Human Life and Public Property nominations were also heavily criticized. WhatCulture criticized the nominations, saying that "It feels as though voters just wanted to nominate Joker for the enormous social media publicity it would generate, and then shaped a dubious awards category around it. Dragged Across Concrete is an even weirder pick, though, both because of its low-budget nature and the fact that there's not that much carnage in it. Michael Bay's 6 Underground is clearly a far worthier nominee than either of those films, given how much obvious human collateral damage is racked up amid the chaotic action sequences."

== Planned ceremony ==
In June 2019, Comedy Dynamics (a company founded by Brian Volk-Weiss) announced that it would produce the awards ceremony. Also, it was to be broadcast live on a "Comedy Dynamics Network", which would have marked the first time a Golden Raspberry ceremony was watched by public through a live telecast.

The unusual scheduling of the 92nd Academy Awards (usually held towards the end of February) on February 9 affected the 2020 edition of the Golden Raspberry Awards. The organizers announced the nominees on February 8, 2020, one day prior to the AMPAS event. The organizers later announced that the year's Razzie ceremony would be held on March 14; it would have been the second ceremony held after the Academy Awards, spurning the tradition of announcing the winners on the eve of the Oscars ceremony.

Despite the COVID-19 pandemic, the ceremony was going to go on as scheduled. The organizers later ultimately announced that the ceremony was cancelled, citing bans on mass gatherings that were enacted by local authorities in the wake of the outbreak. The organizers eventually announced winners online on March 16, 2020, through their website and their YouTube channel.

== See also ==
- 92nd Academy Awards
- 77th Golden Globe Awards
- 73rd British Academy Film Awards
- 35th Independent Spirit Awards
- 26th Screen Actors Guild Awards
- 25th Critics' Choice Awards
- 47th Annie Awards
