= Balboa Productions =

American film and television production company

- Company type: Privately held company
- Industry: Film; Television
- Founded: 2018; 8 years ago
- Founder: Sylvester Stallone
- Headquarters: United States
- Key people: Sylvester Stallone (Co-Executive Chairmen); D. Matt Gellar (EVP)

Balboa Productions is an American film and television production company founded and led by Sylvester Stallone. The studio is named after his character Rocky Balboa from the Rocky franchise.

== History ==
On May 30, 2018, Sylvester Stallone formed Balboa Productions with a partnership with Starlight Culture Entertainment. Braden Aftergood was named as the executive of scripted development. That same month, Balboa Productions announced one of their first projects with the superhero thriller Samaritan. Stallone starred in the titular role, with the movie being released on August 26, 2022, via streaming, through Amazon Prime Video after Amazon's purchase of MGM. Balboa Productions was one of the studios involved with the development of Rambo: Last Blood, released on September 20, 2019. In October 2019, Balboa Productions partnered with DAZN to develop sports featured documentaries. Their first collaboration was realized with, One Night: Joshua vs. Ruiz. Balboa Productions entered a first-look deal with Amazon Studios in April 2023. Braden Aftergood left the company, and D. Matt Gellar replaced him.

=== Projects in development ===
In May 2018, Balboa Productions announced to be developing a number of projects, including: a Jack Johnson biopic, film adaptations of James Byron Huggins novel Hunter, and Michael McGowan and Ralph Pezzullo's memoir Ghost. The studio will also develop a Special Ops film written by retired Army Ranger Max Adams, alongside television series adaptations of Chuck Dixon's Levon's Trade, and Charles Sailor's Second Son. In May 2019, it was announced that Balboa Productions will co-produce the American remake of The Gangster, The Cop, The Devil with B&C Group and CA Entertainment. Don Lee will produce the project, in addition to reprising his starring role in the remake.

In July 2019, it was announced that the studio will produce another slate of projects including: Corin Hardy's monster movie titled Arcane, The Bellhop starring Iko Uwais, and a television series adaptation of Stallone's cult classic Nighthawks. The series will be released via streaming exclusively on Peacock. Balboa Productions will also be involved in the upcoming History Channel Original series, The Tenderloin with Stallone set to direct multiple episodes. As a production studio, they stated that they would like to be "the Blumhouse of action films", referring to Blumhouse Productions' success in the horror movie genre.

In June 2019, it was announced that Balboa Productions will produce a new television series titled, The International. Dolph Lundgren will star in the main role, with Ken Sanzel serving as showrunner, and Stallone scheduled to direct the pilot episode. The series will be released on the CBS network. In February 2020, it was announced that the studio will produce Rowan Athale's film Little America. Stallone was slated to appear in the starring role, while additional funding for the project is being acquired through AGC International. The studio is also set to produce Cassandra Brooksbank's directiorial debut My Masterpiece, starring Maria Bakalova. In May 2025, Stallone's daughter Sophia was set to star in and produce the television series adaptation of S.T. Abby’s ‘Mindf*ck’ thriller book series with Erin Simon, Matt Berenson, D. Matt Geller, & Tonya Owens Houle for Prime Video.

== Productions ==
=== Films ===
Year	Title	Director	Budget	Gross	Notes
2019	Rambo: Last Blood	Adrian Grünberg	$50,000,000	$91,490,353	Distributed by Lionsgate Films
2019	One Night: Joshua vs. Ruiz	Deirdre Fenton and Jamie Horowitz	—N/a	—N/a	Documentary film
2022	Samaritan	Julius Avery	$100,000,000	—N/a	Distributed by United Artists Releasing and Amazon Studios
2023	Creed III	Michael B. Jordan	$75,000,000	$276,148,615	Distributed by Metro-Goldwyn-Mayer
2023	Sly	Thom Zimny	—N/a	—N/a	Distributed by Netflix
2024	Lost on a Mountain in Maine	Andrew Boodhoo Kightlinger	$10 million	$1,181,354	Distributed by Blue Fox Entertainment
2025	A Working Man	David Ayer	$40 million	$88,100,711	Distributed by Amazon MGM Studios
2025	Giant	Rowan Athale	—N/a	—N/a	Distributed by Vertical

=== Television series ===
Year	Title	Creator(s)	Network	Notes
2022–present	Tulsa King	Taylor Sheridan	Paramount+	
2025	Extracted	Brien Meagher	Fox	
