= List of awards and nominations received by Sylvester Stallone =

Sylvester Stallone awards and nominations
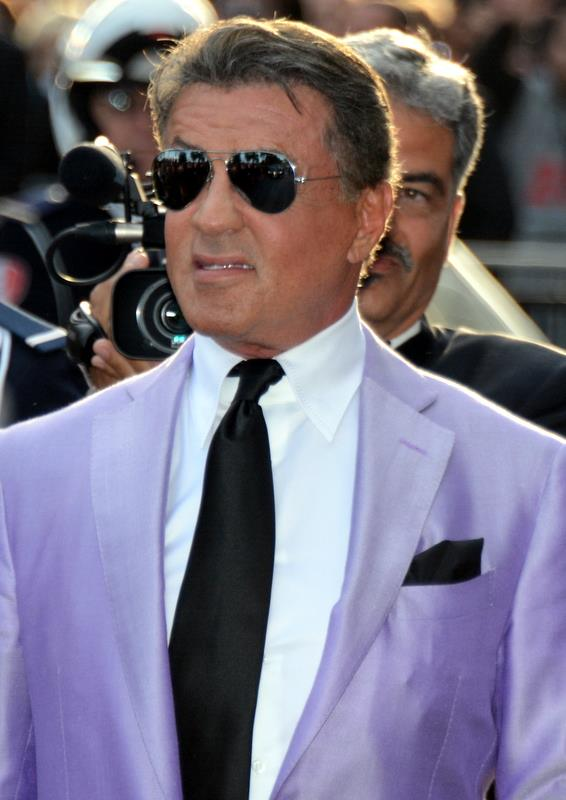
- Stallone at the 2014 Cannes Film Festival
Awards and nominations
Award	Wins	Nominations
Academy Awards	0	3
BAFTA Awards	0	2
Golden Globes	1	3

Totals (Note: Certain award groups do not simply award one winner. They acknowledge several different recipients, have runners-up, and have third place. Since this is a specific recognition and is different from losing an award, runner-up mentions are considered wins in this award tally. For simplification and to avoid errors, each award in this list has been presumed to have had a prior nomination.)
- Wins: 33
- Nominations: 72

This article is a list of awards and nominations received by Sylvester Stallone.

Sylvester Stallone is an American actor, screenwriter, and film director who is known as a film icon. Throughout his career, Stallone received various accolades including a Golden Globe Award, and Critics' Choice Movie Award, a National Board of Review Award and a People's Choice Award as well as nominations for three Academy Awards, a British Academy Film Awards and a Writers Guild of America Award.

Stallone first gained stardom for his role as Rocky Balboa in the sports drama Rocky (1976) which won the Academy Award for Best Picture. Stallone himself was nominated for the Academy Award for Best Actor and the Academy Award for Best Original Screenplay, as well as for the BAFTA Award for Best Actor in a Leading Role, the BAFTA Award for Best Original Screenplay, the Golden Globe Award for Best Actor – Motion Picture Drama, the Golden Globe Award for Best Screenplay, and the Writers Guild of America Award for Best Original Screenplay.

Stallone took a dramatic role in the James Mangold directed crime drama Cop Land (1997) for which he won the Stockholm International Film Festival Best Actor Prize. He reprised the role as Rocky Balboa in Ryan Coogler directed sports drama Creed (2015) for which he received the Critics' Choice Movie Award for Best Supporting Actor, the Golden Globe Award for Best Supporting Actor – Motion Picture, and the National Board of Review Award for Best Supporting Actor as well as a nomination for the Academy Award for Best Supporting Actor.

Over his career, he has been honored with a Motion Picture Star on the Hollywood Walk of Fame in 1984, an Honorary César from the César Awards in 1992, and the Kennedy Center Honors at the John F. Kennedy Center for the Performing Arts in 2025. He has also been awarded by the Palm Springs International Film Festival, the Venice International Film Festival and the Zurich Film Festival.

== Major associations ==
=== Academy Awards ===
Year	Category	Nominated work	Result	Ref.
1976	Best Actor	Rocky	Nominated	
1976	Best Original Screenplay	Rocky	Nominated	
2015	Best Supporting Actor	Creed	Nominated	

=== BAFTA Awards ===
Year	Category	Nominated work	Result	Ref.
British Academy Film Awards
1977	Best Actor in a Leading Role	Rocky	Nominated	
1977	Best Screenplay	Rocky	Nominated	

=== Critics' Choice Awards ===
Year	Category	Nominated work	Result	Ref.
Critics' Choice Movie Awards
2015	Best Supporting Actor	Creed	Won	

=== Golden Globe Awards ===
Year	Category	Nominated work	Result	Ref.
1976	Best Actor – Motion Picture Drama	Rocky	Nominated	
1976	Best Screenplay	Rocky	Nominated	
2016	Best Supporting Actor – Motion Picture	Creed	Won	

== Miscellaneous awards ==
Organizations	Year	Category	Work	Result	Ref.
David di Donatello Awards	1976	Best Foreign Actor	Rocky	Won	
Golden Apple Award	1985	Sour Apple	—N/a	Won	
Golden Apple Award	1996	Male Star of the Year	—N/a	Nominated	
Golden Apple Award	1997	Male Star of the Year	—N/a	Won	
Golden Camera	2004	Best International Actor	—N/a	Won	
Golden Raspberry Awards	1985	Worst Actor	Rhinestone	Won	
Golden Raspberry Awards	1985	Worst Screenplay (Note: (shared with Phil Alden Robinson))	Rhinestone	Nominated	
Golden Raspberry Awards	1986	Worst Actor	Rambo: First Blood Part II	Won	
Golden Raspberry Awards	1986	Worst Actor	Rocky IV	Won	
Golden Raspberry Awards	1986	Worst Director	Rocky IV	Won	
Golden Raspberry Awards	1986	Worst Screenplay (Note: (shared with James Cameron and Kevin Jarre))	Rocky IV	Nominated	
Golden Raspberry Awards	1986	Worst Screenplay	Rambo: First Blood Part II	Won	
Golden Raspberry Awards	1987	Worst Actor	Cobra	Nominated	
Golden Raspberry Awards	1987	Worst Screenplay	Cobra	Nominated	
Golden Raspberry Awards	1988	Worst Actor	Over the Top	Nominated	
Golden Raspberry Awards	1989	Worst Actor	Rambo III	Won	
Golden Raspberry Awards	1989	Worst Screenplay (Note: (shared with Sheldon Lettich))	Rambo III	Nominated	
Golden Raspberry Awards	1990	Worst Actor	Lock Up	Nominated	
Golden Raspberry Awards	1990	Worst Actor	Tango & Cash	Nominated	
Golden Raspberry Awards	1990	Worst Actor of the Decade	Cobra	Won	
Golden Raspberry Awards	1990	Worst Actor of the Decade	Lock Up	Won	
Golden Raspberry Awards	1990	Worst Actor of the Decade	Over the Top	Won	
Golden Raspberry Awards	1990	Worst Actor of the Decade	Rambo: First Blood Part II	Won	
Golden Raspberry Awards	1990	Worst Actor of the Decade	Rambo III	Won	
Golden Raspberry Awards	1990	Worst Actor of the Decade	Rocky IV	Won	
Golden Raspberry Awards	1990	Worst Actor of the Decade	Rhinestone	Won	
Golden Raspberry Awards	1990	Worst Actor of the Decade	Tango & Cash	Won	
Golden Raspberry Awards	1991	Worst Actor	Rocky V	Nominated	
Golden Raspberry Awards	1991	Worst Screenplay	Rocky V	Nominated	
Golden Raspberry Awards	1992	Worst Actor	Oscar	Nominated	
Golden Raspberry Awards	1993	Worst Actor	Stop! Or My Mom Will Shoot	Won	
Golden Raspberry Awards	1994	Worst Screenplay (Note: (shared with Michael France))	Cliffhanger	Nominated	
Golden Raspberry Awards	1995	Worst Actor	The Specialist	Nominated	
Golden Raspberry Awards	1995	Worst Screen Couple (Note: (shared with Sharon Stone; tied with Tom Cruise and Brad Pitt for Interview with the Vampire))	The Specialist	Won	
Golden Raspberry Awards	1996	Worst Actor	Assassins	Nominated	
Golden Raspberry Awards	1996	Worst Actor	Judge Dredd	Nominated	
Golden Raspberry Awards	1997	Worst Actor	Daylight	Nominated	
Golden Raspberry Awards	1999	Worst Supporting Actor (as himself)	An Alan Smithee Film: Burn Hollywood Burn	Nominated	
Golden Raspberry Awards	2000	Worst Actor of the Century	"For 99.5% of everything he has EVER done."	Won	
Golden Raspberry Awards	2001	Worst Actor	Get Carter	Nominated	
Golden Raspberry Awards	2002	Worst Supporting Actor	Driven	Nominated	
Golden Raspberry Awards	2002	Worst Screenplay (Note: (shared with Jan Skrentny and Neal Tabachnick))	Driven	Nominated	
Golden Raspberry Awards	2004	Worst Supporting Actor	Spy Kids 3-D: Game Over (Note: "Whose 5 roles could fill this entire category!")	Won	
Golden Raspberry Awards	2011	Worst Director	The Expendables	Nominated	
Golden Raspberry Awards	2014	Worst Actor	Bullet to the Head	Nominated	
Golden Raspberry Awards	2014	Worst Actor	Escape Plan	Nominated	
Golden Raspberry Awards	2014	Worst Actor	Grudge Match	Nominated	
Golden Raspberry Awards	2016	Razzie Redeemer Award	"From All-Time RAZZIE Champ to award contender for Creed"	Won	
Golden Raspberry Awards	2020	Worst Actor	Rambo: Last Blood	Nominated	
Golden Raspberry Awards	2020	Worst Screen Combo (Note: (shared with "his impotent rage"))	Rambo: Last Blood	Nominated	
Golden Raspberry Awards	2020	Worst Screenplay (Note: (shared with Matthew Cirulnick))	Rambo: Last Blood	Nominated	
Golden Raspberry Awards	2023	Worst Actor	Samaritan	Nominated	
Golden Raspberry Awards	2024	Worst Supporting Actor	Expend4bles	Won	
Golden Raspberry Awards	2026	Worst Supporting Actor	Alarum	Nominated	
Hasty Pudding Theatricals	1986	Man of the Year	—N/a	Won	
Jupiter Awards	1982	Best International Actor	First Blood and Rocky III	Won	
People's Choice Awards	1977	Favorite Movie Actor	Rocky	Nominated	
People's Choice Awards	1978	Favorite Movie Actor	F.I.S.T. and Paradise Alley	Nominated	
People's Choice Awards	1979	Favorite Movie Actor	Rocky II	Nominated	
People's Choice Awards	1985	Favorite Movie Actor	Rambo: First Blood Part II and Rocky IV	Won	
National Board of Review	2015	Best Supporting Actor	Creed	Won	
National Film & TV Awards	2019	Best Actor	Rambo: Last Blood	Nominated	
ShoWest Convention	1984	Star of Stars	—N/a	Won	
ShoWest Convention	1979	Star of the Year	—N/a	Won	
Stockholm International Film Festival	1997	Best Actor	Cop Land	Won	
Video Dealers Software Association	2002	Action Star of the Millennium Award	—N/a	Won	
Writers Guild of America Awards	1976	Best Original Drama	Rocky	Nominated	

== Critics awards ==
Organizations	Year	Category	Work	Result	Ref.
Austin Film Critics Association	2015	Best Supporting Actor	Creed	Won	
Boston Society of Film Critics	2015	Best Supporting Actor	Creed	Nominated	
Chicago Film Critics Association	2015	Best Supporting Actor	Creed	Nominated	
Houston Film Critics Society	2015	Best Supporting Actor	Creed	Nominated	
Online Film Critics Society	2015	Best Supporting Actor	Creed	Nominated	

== Honorary awards ==
Organizations	Year	Award	Result	Ref.
César Award	1992	Honorary César	Honored	
El Gouna Film Festival	2018	Career Achievement Award	Honored	
Hollywood Film Festival	2010	Lifetime Achievement Award	Honored	
Hollywood Walk of Fame	1984	Motion Picture Star	Honored	
John F. Kennedy Center for the Performing Arts	2025	Kennedy Center Honors	Honored	
Palm Springs International Film Festival	1998	Desert Palm Achievement Award	Honored	
Saturn Award	1997	Lifetime Achievement Award	Honored	
Taurus World Stunt Awards	2005	Taurus Honorary Award	Honored	
Venice Film Festival	2009	Jaeger-LeCoultre Glory to the Filmmaker Award	Honored	
Zurich Film Festival	2008	Golden Icon Award	Honored	
