= Protector (2025 film) =

2025 film by Adrian Grünberg

- Theatrical release poster
- Directed by: Adrian Grünberg
- Screenplay by: Bong-Seob Mun
- Produced by: Matthew Helderman; Ford Corbett; Todd Lundbohm; George Furla; Arianne Fraser; Shaun Sanghani; Kenneth Kim; Ho-Sung Pak; Bob Yari; Bong-Seob Mun; Bang-Ok Joo; Ceasar Richbow; Paul W. S. Anderson; Milla Jovovich
- Starring: Milla Jovovich; Isabel Myers; Manny Montana; Matthew Modine
- Cinematography: Vern Nobles Jr.
- Edited by: Christian Wagner; Todd Miller
- Music by: Don Cherel; Sean Brennan
- Production companies: Aanaxion Studio; 828 Productions
- Distributed by: Magenta Light Studios (United States); Ascendio Entertainment; Big Sequence; Roadshow Plus; Special Movie City (South Korea)
- Release dates: September 19, 2025 (BIFF); March 6, 2026 (United States); March 25, 2026 (South Korea)
- Running time: 92 minutes
- Countries: United States; South Korea
- Language: English
- Box office: $2 million

Protector is a 2025 action thriller film directed by Adrian Grünberg and written by Bong-Seob Mun.

== Plot ==
Nikki is an ex-soldier who left her violent life behind to raise her daughter Chloe. Eventually, Nikki wakes up in an abandoned factory and learns that Chloe has been kidnapped, and sets off in a race against time to comb through the criminal underworld in search of Chloe as she eludes both the cops and the military.

== Cast ==
- Milla Jovovich as Nikki Halsted
- Isabel Myers as Chloe Halsted
- Shane Williams as Ben Blaine
- D. B. Sweeney as Captain Michaels
- Matthew Modine as Colonel Joseph Lavelle
- Michael Stahl-David as Detective John Blake
- Lydia Hull as Detective Alexa Jane
- Chase E. Kim as Detective Jin Woo
- Don Harvey as Sullivan
- Texas Battle as SWAT Team Leader Savoy
- Manny Montana as Victor The Butcher
- Brooklyn Sudano as Detective Keyes
- Nick Genta as Control Room Boss
- Gabriel Sloyer as The Chairman
- Yoko Hamamura as Kodera
- Arica Himmel as Ellie

== Production ==
In November 2024, it was reported Milla Jovovich would star in Protector for Highland Film Group, a Taken-like action-thriller film to be directed by Adrian Grünberg from a script by Bong-Seob Mun. Filming was reported to take place in New Mexico.

In May 2025, it was reported that principal photography had wrapped.

== Release ==
The film premiered on September 19, 2025 at the 30th Busan International Film Festival in the Midnight Passion section. It was released on March 6, 2026 in the United States by Magenta Light Studios, and was released in South Korea on March 25, by Ascendio Entertainment.

=== Critical reception ===
On the review aggregator website Rotten Tomatoes, 17% of 30 critics' reviews are positive, with an average rating of 4.2/10. The website's consensus reads: "Only intermittently redeemed by Milla Jovovich's ferocious performance amid its otherwise ridiculous and uninspired execution, Protector veers into baffling, trope-leaden revenge flick territory." Metacritic, which uses a weighted average, assigned the film a score of 41 out of 100, based on 6 critics, indicating "mixed or average" reviews.
