= Aurora Guerrero =

American screenwriter and director

- Born: San Francisco, California, U.S.
- Education: University of California, Berkeley (BA); California Institute of the Arts (MFA)
- Occupations: Film director, screenwriter, activist

Aurora Guerrero is a writer-director from California. As a queer-identifying and Chicana woman from a working-class background, she incorporates the intersection of these identities into her work. Guerrero's best-known films include Viernes Girl (2005) and Mosquita y Mari (2012), which has won several awards.

== Early life ==
Guerrero was born in the Mission District of San Francisco, California, to Mexican immigrant parents, later growing up on the border of the cities of Richmond and El Cerrito while working at her parents' small Mexican restaurant in Berkeley. Guerrero studied both Psychology and Chicano studies at the University of California, Berkeley, completing a Bachelor of Arts. She later moved to Los Angeles to study directing at California Institute of the Arts in Santa Clarita, California earning a Master of Fine Arts. It was here she began to examine the intersection of sexuality, race, and class and better connected to parts of her identity. Her narrative work often examines the intersection of the working class, queer people, and people of color.

== Career ==
Early in her career, she co-founded Womyn Image Makers (WIM), a queer Xicana-identified film collective based out of Los Angeles, along with Dalila Mendez, Maritza Alvarez, and Claudia Mercado. As WIM, in 2005, she directed the short film Pura Lengua, which debuted at the Sundance Film Festival. Her second short film, Viernes Girl, won the 2005 HBO/New York International Latino Film Festival short film competition. She was featured on Filmmaker Magazine's "25 Faces to Watch" list as a result of her work, and both films caught the attention of film institutions such as Sundance, Tribeca, and Film Independent. Guerrero also went on to assist director Patricia Cardoso on her debut feature, Real Women Have Curves, which won the Sundance Film Festival Audience Award in 2002. In 2005 Guerrero was selected as a Sundance Institute Ford Foundation film fellow. While there, she participated in the Native Indigenous Lab with her script for Mosquita y Mari. Through collaboration with members of WIM, Guerrero has created a body of work by or about queer women of color not previously featured or circulated in mainstream production houses. Guerrero asserts "third-space feminism" as the directive for her cinematic interventions, as she has been influenced by the rich intellectual genealogy of Chicana feminist theory.

In 2012, Guerrero made her feature film debut at the Sundance Film Festival with Mosquita y Mari, becoming the first Chicana filmmaker to debut a feature-length film who was also previously a Sundance Institute and Ford Foundation Fellow. Mosquita y Mari has since traveled to over 100 film festivals, including San Francisco International, Melbourne, Guadalajara, São Paulo, and has garnered multiple awards, including Best First Feature at Outfest and Best U.S. Latino Film at New York's Cinema Tropical while picking up Spirit Award and GLAAD nominations for Best First Feature Under 500k and the Piaget's Producer's Award. The film tells the coming-of-age story of two teen Chicanas in Huntington Park, California who form a relationship ignited by sexual attraction.

In 2014, Guerrero announced her next project, Los Valientes, about a young undocumented Latino gay man living in the U.S. Los Valientes, slated to be Guerrero's second feature, has been awarded two grants by SFF/KRF, a 2014 Sundance Feature Film Development Grant and a 2013 Tribeca Narrative Grant, and was selected to participate in IFP's No Borders Market in 2014.

Most of Guerrero's film work has been centered around California, especially the San Francisco Bay Area where she grew up. Her first work not centered in California was the episode of Queen Sugar she directed, centered in Louisiana.

In 2017, Guerrero directed the Ava DuVernay produced Queen Sugar episode "What Do I Care for Morning" which aired as episode three in season two. DuVernay chose Guerrero for the directorial position because of her work Mosquita y Mari. Based on this film, DuVernay felt confident enough that Guerrero could focus on the power of intimacy, especially for Queen Sugar, a show that focuses so much on family, betrayal and injustice. Prior to directing episode three of season two of Queen Sugar, Guerrero had no idea what episode or what she was going to be directing specifically. Exploring the flirtation, tension, and budding romance of this episode is one of her strengths, and it was a perfect directorial fit for her.

DuVernay later recommended Guerrero to Lin-Manuel Miranda to direct the music video for Andra Day's cover of "Burn" from The Hamilton Mixtape.

In 2020, Guerrero coordinated outreach for the first-ever Latinx Directors Database alongside the founding directors Alberto Belli, Joel Novoa, and Diego Valasco. The website is a resource for interested individuals to discover and learn about the work of Latinx filmmakers and seeks to increase representation in cinema. In discussion of the database, Guerrero mentioned the various perspectives that Latinx creators have to offer and the importance of reducing gaps left by historical patterns of exclusion.

== Influences ==
In a blog post that she wrote on the Sundance Institute website on April 28, 2011 Guerrero writes, "My first inspirations were writers. Women of color feminist writers like Audre Lorde, Cherrie Moraga, Gloria Anzaldúa, Chrystos, June Jordan, and Angela Davis. When I discovered their brave works as a freshman in college, a fierce creative seed was planted in me. It was a calling I had the moment I was stripped naked by their words." Her work showcases the experiences of Chicanas that often echo her own experiences.

In an interview with El Tecolote on April 26, 2012, Guerrero stressed the importance of “opening doors to Latinos, especially women and youth, behind the camera in order to help build a community of Latina/o artists,” something she didn't have when she was a girl. She also stresses the importance of activity in politics and cultural activism.

== Awards and nominations ==
Year	Award	Category	Nominated work	Result	Ref
2005	HBO/New York International Latino Film Festival (NYILFF)	Short Script Competition	Viernes Girl	Won	
2012	Outfest	Best First Narrative Feature	Mosquita y Mari	Won	
2012	Festival Las Americas, Chicago	Best Narrative Feature	Mosquita y Mari	Won	
2012	Cinefestival	Best Narrative Feature	Mosquita y Mari	Won	
2012	Santa Fe Independent Film Festival	Best Screenplay	Mosquita y Mari	Won	
2012	Torino International LGBT Film Festival	Queer Award	Mosquita y Mari	Won	
2012	Pink Film Festival Zurich	Audience Award	Mosquita y Mari	Won	
2012	Long Beach QFilm Festival	Best Director – Feature Film	Mosquita y Mari	Won	
2012	Global Can Award	William & Mary Film Festival	Mosquita y Mari	Won	
2012	Time Warner/Sundance Storytelling Fellow	Native American & Indigenous Film Program	Mosquita y Mari	Won	
2013	John Cassavetes Spirit Award	(?)	Mosquita y Mari	Nominated	
2013	John Cassavetes Spirit Award	Best First Screenplay	Mosquita y Mari	Won	
2020	Imagen Award	Best Director – Television	Little America	Nominated	
2021	Imagen Award	Outstanding Directing in a Comedy series	Little America	Nominated	

== Filmography ==
TV series

Year	Title	Notes
2025	Murderbot	
2021	Blindspotting	
2021	Mr. Corman	
2020	Cherish the Day	Season 1 Episode 7
2020	Gentefied	Season 1 Episode 7 & 8
2020	Little America	Season 1 Episode 2
2019	The Red Line	Season 1 Episode 3
2019	13 Reasons Why	Season 3 Episodes 9 & 10
2018	Greenleaf	
2017	Queen Sugar	

Film

Year	Title	Director	Writer
2018	Los Valientes	Yes	Yes
2012	Mosquita y Mari	Yes	Yes

Short film

Year	Title	Director	Writer	Co-producer
2018	Andra Day: Burn	Yes	Yes	No
2008	Pandora’s	Yes	Yes	Yes
2005	Viernes Girl	Yes	Yes	No
2005	Pura Lengua	Yes	No	No

Other credits

Year	Title	Role	Notes
2018	Caracol Cruzando	Story Editor	Short film
2013	29th Independent Spirit Awards	Herself	
2009	La Mission	Assistant to Director	
2008	El Primo	Special thanks	Short film
2002	Real Women Have Curves	Assistant to Ms. Cardoso	
2002	sIDney	Special thanks	Short film

== See also ==
- List of female film and television directors
- List of lesbian filmmakers
- List of LGBT-related films directed by women
