= The Fanatic (film) =

- Theatrical release poster
- Directed by: Fred Durst
- Screenplay by: Dave Bekerman; Fred Durst
- Story by: Fred Durst
- Produced by: Daniel Grodnik; Oscar Generale; Bill Kenwright
- Starring: John Travolta; Devon Sawa; Ana Golja; Jacob Grodnik; James Paxton
- Cinematography: Conrad W. Hall
- Edited by: Malcolm Crowe; Nik Voytas
- Music by: Gary Hickeson; John Swihart; Blvck Ceiling
- Production companies: VMI Worldwide; Pretzel Fang Productions; Wonderfilm; Media Finance Capital; Bill Kenwright Films
- Distributed by: Quiver Distribution; Redbox Entertainment
- Release date: August 30, 2019 (United States)
- Running time: 89 minutes
- Country: United States
- Language: English
- Box office: $3,153

The Fanatic is a 2019 American psychological thriller film directed and co-written by Fred Durst. The film stars John Travolta, Devon Sawa, Ana Golja, Jacob Grodnik and James Paxton. The plot follows Moose, an autistic man who develops an unhealthy obsession with his favorite actor, Hunter Dunbar, and stalks him. The film was given a limited theatrical and VOD release, on August 30, 2019 by Quiver Distribution and Redbox Entertainment, and received mainly negative reviews, with some praise for Travolta's performance.

== Plot ==
Moose is an autistic man who works as a street performer on Hollywood Boulevard. An avid film buff, Moose fills his apartment with memorabilia from various movies, including those of cult movie star Hunter Dunbar, with whom he has developed an unhealthy parasocial obsession. When Moose finally gets an opportunity to meet him and get an autograph, he loses his chance when Dunbar's ex-wife Brenda abruptly arrives and starts an argument. As Dunbar storms away, Moose follows him begging for an autograph, only for a frustrated Dunbar to rudely accost him.

Later, Moose's friend, a young paparazza named Leah, shows Moose a mobile app that publishes the home addresses of celebrities, including Dunbar. Moose visits Dunbar's house and tries to give him a letter while also begging him for an autograph. Dunbar, fearing for the safety of his young son around Moose, tells him to stay out of their neighborhood, reluctantly signing Moose’s shirt as an autograph. Moose returns by climbing a fence, but is scared off by Dunbar's housekeeper Dora. Despondent, Moose gets into an argument with Leah and then violently attacks Todd, a crude fellow performer who had earlier harassed and tormented Moose.

Moose returns to Dunbar's home and is once again confronted by Dora. Becoming frightened, he pushes her away, inadvertently causing her to fall and strike her head, killing her. He sneaks into Dunbar's house, going through his personal belongings before hiding in a closet. Later, Dunbar returns home and falls asleep. Moose touches his body and takes photos next to him, which he uploads onto his social media accounts before fleeing.

The following day, Dunbar sees Moose on his street and threatens to kill him if he sees him again, and also calls him a stalker. Moose has a mental breakdown and burns all of his Hunter Dunbar memorabilia. Leah visits him and confronts him about his behavior, threatening to go to the police for his own good, but Moose furiously kicks her out of his home.

Moose , in a presumed act of vengeance, returns to Dunbar's home while he's asleep and ties him to his bed. After Dunbar wakes up, Moose taunts him with a series of cruel and violent pranks. A terrified Dunbar pleads for Moose to let him go with promises of autographs and friendship. Moose agrees and unties Dunbar, who brutally attacks him. After shooting off Moose's fingers with a concealed rifle and stabbing him in the eye, Dunbar collapses, shocked by his own actions. Dunbar regains his composure and calmly escorts Moose out of his home, also having bandaged Moose's hands.

Moose aimlessly wanders the streets of Hollywood, as passing tourists request to take photos with him, believing his wounds to be realistic prosthetic makeup. Leah finds him and takes him to a hospital. Meanwhile, Dunbar is arrested by the police, who mistakenly believe he killed Dora. Leah describes how Moose "eventually looks at his injuries like a badge of honour", followed by a drawing of a happy Moose with a pirate hook and an eye patch, with Leah included in the drawing as a guardian angel.

== Cast ==
- John Travolta as Moose, an autistic man working as a street performer who stalks his favorite actor. His real name is unknown.
  - Saul Green as Young Moose
- Devon Sawa as Hunter Dunbar, an arrogant actor, who struggles with major personal issues.
- Ana Golja as Leah, Moose's friend.
- Jacob Grodnik as Todd
- James Paxton as Slim, Todd’s friend.
- Denny Méndez as Amanda

== Production ==
=== Development ===
Pretzel Fang produced the film with VMI Worldwide, Wonderfilm Media, Media Finance Capital, and Primal Film LLC. Quiver Distribution funded the film. In March 2018, principal photography began in Birmingham, Alabama. Redbox Entertainment also funded the film in exchange for release via the Redbox kiosks and streaming services.

== Reception ==
=== Box office ===
The Fanatic earned $3,153 from 52 theaters in the U.S. on its opening day, making it a US box-office failure.

=== Critical response ===
On the review aggregator website Rotten Tomatoes, 15% of 73 critics' reviews are positive, with an average rating of 3.6/10. The website's consensus reads: "John Travolta gives it his oddly coiffed all, but The Fanatic rings hollow as an examination of the way fan appreciation can curdle into toxic obsession." Metacritic, which uses a weighted average, assigned the film a score of 18 out of 100, based on 19 critics, indicating "overwhelming dislike".

NPR's Simon Abrams gave the film a negative review, calling it a noticeable downgrade from director Fred Durst's The Education of Charlie Banks and The Longshots, and labeling the work a "miserable psychodrama." Specific elements attracting criticism included the "cliché-filled voiceover narration" and "a bunch of scenes where Travolta zealously overacts". Glenn Kenny of The New York Times also wrote a negative review of the film, arguing that it "delineates the border that separates the merely stale from the genuinely rancid."

In a positive review, Josh Millican of Dread Central called the film "a riveting indie with genuine suspense", and he praised both Travolta's and Sawa's performances.

Despite the negative reviews, Travolta has defended the film, saying he was very proud of it and praising Fred Durst as a "wonderful" director.

=== Accolades ===
The film was nominated in three categories at the 40th Golden Raspberry Awards, Worst Picture, Worst Director (Fred Durst), and Worst Actor which John Travolta won (also for his performance in Trading Paint).
