= Mosquita y Mari =

2012 American film

- Directed by: Aurora Guerrero
- Written by: Aurora Guerrero
- Starring: Fenessa Pineda; Venecia Troncoso
- Cinematography: Magela Crosignani
- Release date: 22 January 2012 (Sundance Film Festival)
- Country: United States
- Language: English

Mosquita y Mari is a 2012 coming-of-age film written and directed by Aurora Guerrero and starring Fenessa Pineda and Venecia Troncoso. It follows two 15-year-old girls, Yolanda (Mosquita) and Mari, as they navigate a budding friendship full of intimate connections that neither of them have the words to describe. It premiered at the 2012 Sundance Film Festival.

== Plot ==
When Yolanda Olveros meets her new neighbor Mari Rodriguez, all they see in each other are their differences. An only child, sheltered Yolanda's sole concern is fulfilling her parents' dream of a college-bound future. With her father's recent death, street-wise Mari, the elder of two, carries the weight of her sister as their mother works to keep them above water.

But despite their contrasting realities, Yolanda and Mari are soon brought together when Mari is threatened with expulsion after saving Yolanda from an incident at school. The girls forge a friendship that soon proves more complex than anticipated when the girls unexpectedly experience an intimate moment between them.

As Yolanda and Mari's feelings reach new depths, their inability to put words to their emotions leads to a web of unspoken jealousy. Mari ends up meeting with a boy from the street for money in their study hideaway. The two girls spend time apart. The final scene shows them looking at each other from opposing sides of the street, with gentle smiles.

== Cast ==
Fenessa Pineda as Yolanda Olveros (nicknamed Mosquita)

Venecia Troncoso as Mari Rodriguez

Joaquín Garrido as Mr. Olveros

Laura Pataleno as Mrs. Olveros

Dulce Maria Solis as Mrs. Rodriguez

Marisela Uscanga as Vicky

Melissa Uscanga as Vero

Omar Leyva as Mr. Galvez

Armando Cosio as Don Pedro

== Production ==
=== Conception ===
The concept for Mosquita y Mari started out as a series of short stories about two girls growing up together and driven by an "unspoken attraction" to each other, heavily based on a friendship she had experienced in her youth, which Guerrero wrote in film school for an exercise about "writing what you know". Over the next seven years, Guerrero added to the series and finally edited it down into a single feature film. She has described the writing process as liberating.

=== Funding and Development ===
The film had a $80,000 production budget, which was funded entirely on Kickstarter.

Guerrero worked with Communities for a Better Environment to ensure that the production of Mosquita y Mari would be beneficial to Huntington Park, where it was set and filmed. As a result, film production used a youth mentorship program. According to Guerrero, "anyone interested in media was brought on to the film and mentored by one of the department heads, depending on the interest of the young person." Every department head in the film mentored a youth from the area. As a result of the program, the majority of young characters in the film were played by residents of Huntington Park, and the film had additional access to shooting locations scouted and secured at a discount by locals. The young actors helped modify some of the dialogue to more accurately reflect modern high school lingo.

Guerrero searched SoundCloud and Remezcla for recent music by Latino artists for the soundtrack, as well as working with composer Ryan Beveridge. She was particularly concerned with creating a new, fresh soundtrack that avoided overused clichés common in American films featuring Latino characters, such as strumming guitars.

== Themes ==
Mosquita y Mari explores themes of coming-of-age and sexuality. The film is based on a "love story" between two teen girls, who never put words to their relationship. Guerrero comments that many people "experience queer feelings and queer identity at a very young age", whether or not they label them as such at the time, and she had wanted to capture this in her film. She has summarized the concept in discussing her own experiences, which inspired the film: "When looking back, long before I identified as queer, I realized my first love was one of my best friends. It was the type of friendship that was really tender and sweet and sexually charged but we never crossed that line." Besides sexuality, this experience also speaks to the process of coming of age, with Guerrero commenting that it transformed her from "just feeling comfortable in myself, to feeling like I was somebody, to feeling like I was Aurora and I belonged in the world."

Shraddha Tripathi writes about Yolanda and Mari's relationship and their sexualities that are never fully explored in her 2025 paper titled "Beyond the Margins." She comments on how the film does not use stereotypical romance tropes or explicit identity labels, allowing it to convey a more authentic experience of queer romance for youth living in working-class communities. She also claims that the film has a "non-linear, atmospheric narrative" that keeps the two girls' relationship undefined, which gives the many silences throughout the story more emotional weight. In her 2017 paper titled "Re-Mapping Queer Desire(s) on Greater Los Angeles," Micaela Jamaica Díaz-Sánchez further notes that these heavy silences are present in many of the scenes where the two girls almost touch or almost kiss but never do. They symbolize restraint by the girls and a lack of words to describe their feelings for one another, which Alberto Sandoval-Sánchez claims is because the two girls "have no tools to question heteronormativity at that age."

One particular aspect of sexuality that Mosquita y Mari addresses throughout the story is the theme of heteronormativity. Arturo J. Aldama and Fredrick Luis Aldama discuss in their book, "Decolonizing Latinx Masculinities," that Yolanda and Mari's relationship is constantly contrasted against the idea of a heteronormative relationship. For example, the authors note that when Mari draws her and Yolanda's name in dust on the abandoned car, this echoes the heterosexual couple names similarly etched into the car. However, at the same time, the protagonists' names have much less permanence in dust compared to the scratches made by the other couples, alluding to the temporariness of the girls' queer relationship. Furthermore, Arturo and Frederick Aldama focus on the end of the film when Mari engages in survival prostitution with an older Latino main the warehouse, her and Yolanda's safe space. According to them, this demonstrates how the protagonists' relationship is abruptly ended by "pervasive heteronormative and violent sexualizations and the need to survive."

The film also revolves around themes of immigration, class, and gender.

== Critical reception ==
On Rotten Tomatoes, the critics' approval rating for Mosquita y Mari is 90%, based on 20 reviews.

Mosquita y Mari won the Outstanding First U.S. Dramatic Feature Film Award at Outfest 2012, the Queer Award at the 27th Torino GLBT Film Festival, and was nominated for the 28th annual Independent Spirit John Cassavetes Award. Lead actor Fenessa Pineda won Outfest's Outstanding Actress Award.

The New York Times praised Mosquita y Mari as "an unassuming indie jewel" that "resists all of the clichés that its story of the fraught friendship between two 15-year-old girls invites." Kalvin Henely of Slant Magazine had a similar positive review of the movie, stating that "Mosquita y Mari is never out to toy with audiences' perceptions, but to be honest about how feelings aren't neat." Duane Byrge of The Hollywood Reporter noted that characteristics such as the unsteady camerawork gave the film a low-budget feel, which he claimed was an asset to the work. On the contrary, Nicholas Bell of IonCinema criticized the shaky camerawork as a flaw of the film. He described the work as heartfelt but otherwise unmemorable, stating that the cultural and religious contexts of the film were the only aspects setting it apart from better made movies with the same storyline.

The setting of the film was praised by critics for showcasing an underrepresented area of Los Angeles. Carlos Aguilar of Sundance Institute claimed Mosquita y Mari was the first movie he had seen that is set around the area he grew up, which felt like a "glitch in the system" given that Hollywood seemed so far away to him. Sofía Aguilar of LatinaMedia.Co, a Rotten Tomatoes approved publication staffed by Latina and queer writers, described how the film, highlighting what she sees as the real East LA and not a Hollywood rendition of it, was a "powerful and emotional viewing experience."

Autostraddle ranked the film 20th on its list of the 102 best lesbian films.

== See also ==
- List of LGBT-related films directed by women
