= Fenessa Pineda =

American-Mexican actress

- Occupation: Actress
- Years active: 2005–present

Fenessa Pineda is an American-Mexican actress. She is best known for Rambo: Last Blood (2019), Mosquita y Mari (2012) and Sin Cielo (2018).

== Career ==
Pineda made her acting debut in 2005, she appeared in an episode of Girlfriends. She made her feature film debut in 2006, she played a 2nd Grade Girl in You, Me and Dupree. In 2012 she appeared in the 2012 coming-of-age film Mosquita y Mari. In 2019, she appeared in the American action film Rambo: Last Blood, she received a Golden Raspberry Award nomination for Worst Supporting Actress.

== Filmography ==
=== Film ===
Year	Title	Role	Notes
2006	MaxiDoodles: Behind the Makeup	Wheelchair Girl	Short film
2006	You, Me and Dupree	2nd Grade Girl	
2012	Mosquita y Mari	Yolanda	
2018	Sin Cielo	Delia	Short film
2018	Kiki & the Mxfits	Nene	Short film
2019	Rambo: Last Blood	Gizelle	
TBA	Dark Wolf Gang	Frankie	completed

=== Television ===
Year	Title	Role	Notes
2005	Girlfriends	Maria	Episode: "Finn-ished"
2007	Pandemic	Belinda Ruiz	
2015–2017	The Fosters	Rhiana	5 episodes

== Awards ==
Year	Award	Category	Work	Result	Ref.
2020	Golden Raspberry Awards	Worst Supporting Actress	Rambo: Last Blood	Nominated	
