= Golden Raspberry Award for Worst Supporting Actress =

Award

- Awarded for: Worst in film
- Country: United States
- Presented by: Golden Raspberry Award Foundation
- First award: Amy Irving, Honeysuckle Rose (1980)
- Currently held by: Scarlet Rose Stallone, Gunslingers (2025)
- Website: www.razzies.com

The Golden Raspberry Award for Worst Supporting Actress is an award presented annually at the Golden Raspberry Awards (or "Razzies") to the worst supporting actress of the previous year. Nominees and winners are voted on by the Golden Raspberry Foundation, a group that anyone can join if they pay a yearly subscription fee.

As it is intended to be a humorous award, drag performers are eligible to be nominated. On occasion, people featured in documentary films have also been nominated for "worst actress".

The following is a list of nominees and recipients of that award, along with the film(s) for which they were nominated and the character they played.

== Winners and nominees ==
=== 1980s ===
Year	Actress	Film	Character
1980 (1st)
1980 (1st)	Amy Irving	Honeysuckle Rose	Lily Ramsey
1980 (1st)	Elizabeth Ashley	Windows	Andrea Glassen
1980 (1st)	Georg Stanford Brown (Note: Male actor performing in drag.)	Stir Crazy	Rory Schultebrand
1980 (1st)	Betsy Palmer	Friday the 13th	Pamela Voorhees
1980 (1st)	Marilyn Sokol	Can't Stop the Music	Lulu Brecht
1981 (2nd)
1981 (2nd)	Diana Scarwid	Mommie Dearest	Christina Crawford
1981 (2nd)	Rutanya Alda	Mommie Dearest	Carol Ann
1981 (2nd)	Farrah Fawcett	The Cannonball Run	Pamela Glover
1981 (2nd)	Mara Hobel	Mommie Dearest	Christina Crawford (child)
1981 (2nd)	Shirley Knight	Endless Love	Ann Butterfield
1982 (3rd)
1982 (3rd)	Aileen Quinn	Annie	Annie
1982 (3rd)	Rutanya Alda	Amityville II: The Possession	Dolores Montelli
1982 (3rd)	Colleen Camp	The Seduction	Robin
1982 (3rd)	Dyan Cannon	Deathtrap	Myra Bruhl
1982 (3rd)	Lois Nettleton	Butterfly	Belle Morgan
1983 (4th)
1983 (4th)	Sybil Danning	Chained Heat	Ericka
1983 (4th)	Sybil Danning	Hercules	Ariadne
1983 (4th)	Bibi Besch	The Lonely Lady	Veronica Randall
1983 (4th)	Finola Hughes	Staying Alive	Laura
1983 (4th)	Amy Irving	Yentl (also Oscar-nominated)	Hadass
1983 (4th)	Diana Scarwid	Strange Invaders	Margaret Newman
1984 (5th)
1984 (5th)	Lynn-Holly Johnson	Where the Boys Are '84	Laurie
1984 (5th)	Susan Anton	Cannonball Run II	Jill Rivers
1984 (5th)	Olivia d'Abo	Bolero	Paloma
1984 (5th)	Olivia d'Abo	Conan the Destroyer	Princess Jehnna
1984 (5th)	Marilu Henner	Cannonball Run II	Betty
1984 (5th)	Diane Lane	The Cotton Club	Vera Cicero
1984 (5th)	Diane Lane	Streets of Fire	Ellen Aim
1985 (6th)
1985 (6th)	Brigitte Nielsen	Rocky IV	Ludmilla Drago
1985 (6th)	Sandahl Bergman	Red Sonja	Queen Gedren of Berkubane
1985 (6th)	Marilu Henner	Perfect	Sally
1985 (6th)	Marilu Henner	Rustlers' Rhapsody	Tracy
1985 (6th)	Julia Nickson	Rambo: First Blood Part II	Co-Bao
1985 (6th)	Talia Shire	Rocky IV	Adrian Pennino Balboa
1986 (7th)
1986 (7th)	Dom DeLuise	Haunted Honeymoon	Aunt Kate Abbot
1986 (7th)	Louise Fletcher	Invaders from Mars	Mrs. McKeltch
1986 (7th)	Zelda Rubinstein	Poltergeist II: The Other Side	Tangina Barrons
1986 (7th)	Beatrice Straight	Power	Claire Hastings
1986 (7th)	Kristin Scott Thomas	Under the Cherry Moon	Mary Sharon
1987 (8th)
1987 (8th)	Daryl Hannah	Wall Street	Darien Taylor
1987 (8th)	Gloria Foster	Leonard Part 6	Medusa Johnson
1987 (8th)	Mariel Hemingway	Superman IV: The Quest for Peace	Lacy Warfield
1987 (8th)	Grace Jones	Siesta	Conchita
1987 (8th)	Isabella Rossellini	Siesta	Marie
1987 (8th)	Isabella Rossellini	Tough Guys Don't Dance	Madeleine Regency
1988 (9th)
1988 (9th)	Kristy McNichol	Two Moon Junction	Patti Jean
1988 (9th)	Eileen Brennan	The New Adventures of Pippi Longstocking	Miss Bannister
1988 (9th)	Daryl Hannah	High Spirits	Mary Plunkett Brogan
1988 (9th)	Mariel Hemingway	Sunset	Cheryl King
1988 (9th)	Zelda Rubinstein	Poltergeist III	Tangina Barrons
1989 (10th)
1989 (10th)	Brooke Shields	Speed Zone	Herself
1989 (10th)	Angelyne	Earth Girls Are Easy	Herself
1989 (10th)	Anne Bancroft	Bert Rigby, You're a Fool	Meredith Perlestein
1989 (10th)	Madonna	Bloodhounds of Broadway	Hortense Hathaway
1989 (10th)	Kurt Russell	Tango & Cash	Gabriel Cash

=== 1990s ===
Year	Actress	Film	Character
1990 (11th)
1990 (11th)	Sofia Coppola	The Godfather Part III	Mary Corleone
1990 (11th)	Roseanne Barr (voice only)	Look Who's Talking Too	Julie Ubriacco
1990 (11th)	Kim Cattrall	The Bonfire of the Vanities	Judy McCoy
1990 (11th)	Julie Newmar	Ghosts Can't Do It	Angel
1990 (11th)	Ally Sheedy	Betsy's Wedding	Connie Hopper
1991 (12th)
1991 (12th)	Sean Young (as the twin who's murdered)	A Kiss Before Dying	Dorothy Carlsson
1991 (12th)	Sandra Bernhard	Hudson Hawk	Minerva Mayflower
1991 (12th)	John Candy	Nothing but Trouble	Eldona
1991 (12th)	Julia Roberts	Hook	Tinkerbell
1991 (12th)	Marisa Tomei	Oscar	Lisa Provolone
1992 (13th)
1992 (13th)	Estelle Getty	Stop! Or My Mom Will Shoot	Tutti Bomowski
1992 (13th)	Ann-Margret	Newsies	Medda Larkson
1992 (13th)	Tracy Pollan	A Stranger Among Us	Mara
1992 (13th)	Jeanne Tripplehorn	Basic Instinct	Dr. Beth Garner
1992 (13th)	Sean Young	Once Upon a Crime	Phoebe
1993 (14th)
1993 (14th)	Faye Dunaway	The Temp	Charlene Towne
1993 (14th)	Anne Archer	Body of Evidence	Joanne Braslow
1993 (14th)	Sandra Bullock	Demolition Man	Lt. Lenina Huxley
1993 (14th)	Colleen Camp	Sliver	Judy Marks
1993 (14th)	Janine Turner	Cliffhanger	Jessie Deighan
1994 (15th)
1994 (15th)	Rosie O'Donnell	Car 54, Where Are You?	Lucille Toody
1994 (15th)	Rosie O'Donnell	Exit to Eden	Sheila Kingston
1994 (15th)	Rosie O'Donnell	The Flintstones	Betty Rubble
1994 (15th)	Kathy Bates	North	Alaskan Mom
1994 (15th)	Elizabeth Taylor	The Flintstones	Pearl Slaghoople
1994 (15th)	Lesley Ann Warren	Color of Night	Sondra Dorio
1994 (15th)	Sean Young	Even Cowgirls Get the Blues	Marie Barth
1995 (16th)
1995 (16th)	Madonna	Four Rooms	Elspeth
1995 (16th)	Amy the Talking Gorilla	Congo	Amy
1995 (16th)	Bo Derek	Tommy Boy	Beverly Barish
1995 (16th)	Gina Gershon	Showgirls	Cristal Connors
1995 (16th)	Lin Tucci	Showgirls	Henrietta Bazoom
1996 (17th)
1996 (17th)	Melanie Griffith	Mulholland Falls	Katherine Hoover
1996 (17th)	Faye Dunaway	The Chamber	Lee Cayhall Bowen
1996 (17th)	Faye Dunaway	Dunston Checks In	Mrs. Dubrow
1996 (17th)	Jami Gertz	Twister	Melissa Reeves
1996 (17th)	Daryl Hannah	Two Much	Liz Kerner
1996 (17th)	Teri Hatcher	Heaven's Prisoners	Claudette Rocque
1996 (17th)	Teri Hatcher	2 Days in the Valley	Becky Foxx
1997 (18th)
1997 (18th)	Alicia Silverstone	Batman & Robin	Barbara Wilson / Batgirl
1997 (18th)	Faye Dunaway	Albino Alligator	Janet Boudreaux
1997 (18th)	Milla Jovovich	The Fifth Element	Leeloo
1997 (18th)	Julia Louis-Dreyfus	Fathers' Day	Carrie Lawrence
1997 (18th)	Uma Thurman	Batman & Robin	Pamela Isley / Poison Ivy
1998 (19th)
1998 (19th)	Maria Pitillo	Godzilla	Audrey Timmonds
1998 (19th)	Ellen Albertini Dow	54	Disco Dottie
1998 (19th)	Jenny McCarthy	BASEketball	Yvette Denslow
1998 (19th)	Liv Tyler	Armageddon	Grace Stamper
1998 (19th)	Raquel Welch	Chairman of the Board	Grace Kosik
1999 (20th)
1999 (20th)	Denise Richards	The World Is Not Enough	Christmas Jones
1999 (20th)	Sofia Coppola	Star Wars: Episode I – The Phantom Menace	Saché
1999 (20th)	Salma Hayek	Dogma	Serendipity
1999 (20th)	Salma Hayek	Wild Wild West	Rita Escobar
1999 (20th)	Kevin Kline	Wild Wild West	Prostitute
1999 (20th)	Juliette Lewis	The Other Sister	Carla Tate

=== 2000s ===
Year	Actress	Film	Character
2000 (21st)
2000 (21st)	Kelly Preston	Battlefield Earth	Chirk
2000 (21st)	Patricia Arquette	Little Nicky	Valerie Veran
2000 (21st)	Joan Collins	The Flintstones in Viva Rock Vegas	Pearl Slaghoople
2000 (21st)	Thandiwe Newton	Mission: Impossible 2	Nyah Nordoff-Hall
2000 (21st)	Rene Russo	The Adventures of Rocky and Bullwinkle	Natasha Fatale
2001 (22nd)
2001 (22nd)	Estella Warren	Driven	Sophia Simone
2001 (22nd)	Estella Warren	Planet of the Apes	Daena
2001 (22nd)	Drew Barrymore	Freddy Got Fingered	Davidson's Receptionist
2001 (22nd)	Courteney Cox	3000 Miles to Graceland	Cybil Waingrow
2001 (22nd)	Julie Hagerty	Freddy Got Fingered	Julie Brody
2001 (22nd)	Goldie Hawn	Town & Country	Mona Morris
2002 (23rd)
2002 (23rd)	Madonna	Die Another Day	Verity
2002 (23rd)	Lara Flynn Boyle	Men in Black II	Serleena
2002 (23rd)	Bo Derek	The Master of Disguise	Herself
2002 (23rd)	Natalie Portman	Star Wars: Episode II – Attack of the Clones	Padmé Amidala
2002 (23rd)	Rebecca Romijn	Rollerball	Aurora
2003 (24th)
2003 (24th)	Demi Moore	Charlie's Angels: Full Throttle	Madison Lee
2003 (24th)	Lainie Kazan	Gigli	Mrs. Gigli
2003 (24th)	Brittany Murphy	Just Married	Sarah Leezak
2003 (24th)	Kelly Preston	The Cat in the Hat	Joan Walden
2003 (24th)	Tara Reid	My Boss's Daughter	Lisa Taylor
2004 (25th)
2004 (25th)	Britney Spears (Note: Nomination is for a documentary appearance, not an acting performance.)	Fahrenheit 9/11	Herself
2004 (25th)	Carmen Electra	Starsky & Hutch	Stacey Haack
2004 (25th)	Jennifer Lopez	Jersey Girl	Gertrude Steiney
2004 (25th)	Condoleezza Rice	Fahrenheit 9/11	Herself
2004 (25th)	Sharon Stone	Catwoman	Laurel Hedare
2005 (26th)
2005 (26th)	Paris Hilton	House of Wax	Paige Edwards
2005 (26th)	Carmen Electra	Dirty Love	Michelle Lopez
2005 (26th)	Katie Holmes	Batman Begins	Rachel Dawes
2005 (26th)	Ashlee Simpson	Undiscovered	Clea
2005 (26th)	Jessica Simpson	The Dukes of Hazzard	Daisy Duke
2006 (27th)
2006 (27th)	Carmen Electra	Date Movie	Anne
2006 (27th)	Carmen Electra	Scary Movie 4	Holly
2006 (27th)	Kate Bosworth	Superman Returns	Lois Lane
2006 (27th)	Kristin Chenoweth	Deck the Halls	Tia Hall
2006 (27th)	Kristin Chenoweth	The Pink Panther	Cherie
2006 (27th)	Kristin Chenoweth	RV	Mary Jo Gornicke
2006 (27th)	Jenny McCarthy	John Tucker Must Die	Lori Spencer
2006 (27th)	Michelle Rodriguez	BloodRayne	Katarin
2007 (28th)
2007 (28th)	Eddie Murphy	Norbit	Rasputia
2007 (28th)	Jessica Biel	I Now Pronounce You Chuck & Larry	Alex McDonough
2007 (28th)	Jessica Biel	Next	Liz Cooper
2007 (28th)	Carmen Electra	Epic Movie	Mystique
2007 (28th)	Julia Ormond	I Know Who Killed Me	Susan Fleming
2007 (28th)	Nicollette Sheridan	Code Name: The Cleaner	Diane
2008 (29th)
2008 (29th)	Paris Hilton	Repo! The Genetic Opera	Amber Sweet
2008 (29th)	Carmen Electra	Disaster Movie	The Beautiful Assassin
2008 (29th)	Carmen Electra	Meet the Spartans	Queen Margo
2008 (29th)	Kim Kardashian	Disaster Movie	Lisa Taylor
2008 (29th)	Jenny McCarthy	Witless Protection	Connie
2008 (29th)	Leelee Sobieski	88 Minutes	Lauren Douglas (Lydia Doherty)
2008 (29th)	Leelee Sobieski	In the Name of the King	Muriella
2009 (30th)
2009 (30th)	Sienna Miller	G.I. Joe: The Rise of Cobra	The Baroness
2009 (30th)	Candice Bergen	Bride Wars	Marion St. Claire
2009 (30th)	Ali Larter	Obsessed	Lisa Sheridan
2009 (30th)	Kelly Preston	Old Dogs	Vicki Greer
2009 (30th)	Julie White	Transformers: Revenge of the Fallen	Judy Witwicky

=== 2010s ===
Year	Actress	Film	Character
2010 (31st)
2010 (31st)	Jessica Alba	The Killer Inside Me	Joyce Lakeland
2010 (31st)	Jessica Alba	Little Fockers	Andi Garcia
2010 (31st)	Jessica Alba	Machete	Sartana Rivera
2010 (31st)	Jessica Alba	Valentine's Day	Morley Clarkson
2010 (31st)	Cher	Burlesque	Tess
2010 (31st)	Liza Minnelli	Sex and the City 2	Herself
2010 (31st)	Nicola Peltz	The Last Airbender	Katara
2010 (31st)	Barbra Streisand	Little Fockers	Roz Focker
2011 (32nd)
2011 (32nd)	David Spade	Jack and Jill	Monica
2011 (32nd)	Katie Holmes	Jack and Jill	Erin Sadelstein
2011 (32nd)	Rosie Huntington-Whiteley	Transformers: Dark of the Moon	Carly Spencer
2011 (32nd)	Brandon T. Jackson	Big Mommas: Like Father, Like Son	Charmaine
2011 (32nd)	Nicole Kidman	Just Go with It	Devlin Adams
2012 (33rd)
2012 (33rd)	Rihanna	Battleship	Cora Raikes
2012 (33rd)	Jessica Biel	Playing for Keeps	Stacie Dryer
2012 (33rd)	Jessica Biel	Total Recall	Melina
2012 (33rd)	Brooklyn Decker	Battleship	Samantha Shane
2012 (33rd)	Brooklyn Decker	What to Expect When You're Expecting	Skyler Cooper
2012 (33rd)	Ashley Greene	The Twilight Saga: Breaking Dawn – Part 2	Alice Cullen
2012 (33rd)	Jennifer Lopez	What to Expect When You're Expecting	Holly
2013 (34th)
2013 (34th)	Kim Kardashian	Temptation: Confessions of a Marriage Counselor	Ava
2013 (34th)	Salma Hayek	Grown Ups 2	Roxanne Feder
2013 (34th)	Katherine Heigl	The Big Wedding	Lyla Griffin
2013 (34th)	Lady Gaga	Machete Kills	Third Face of El Chameleon
2013 (34th)	Lindsay Lohan	Inappropriate Comedy	Herself
2013 (34th)	Lindsay Lohan	Scary Movie 5	Herself
2014 (35th)
2014 (35th)	Megan Fox	Teenage Mutant Ninja Turtles	April O'Neil
2014 (35th)	Cameron Diaz	Annie	Miss Colleen Hannigan
2014 (35th)	Nicola Peltz	Transformers: Age of Extinction	Tessa Yeager
2014 (35th)	Bridgette Cameron Ridenour	Saving Christmas	Kirk's Sister
2014 (35th)	Susan Sarandon	Tammy	Pearl Balzen
2015 (36th)
2015 (36th)	Kaley Cuoco	Alvin and the Chipmunks: The Road Chip	Eleanor
2015 (36th)	Kaley Cuoco	The Wedding Ringer	Gretchen Palmer
2015 (36th)	Rooney Mara	Pan	Tiger Lily
2015 (36th)	Michelle Monaghan	Pixels	Lt. Col. Violet van Patten
2015 (36th)	Julianne Moore	Seventh Son	Mother Malkin
2015 (36th)	Amanda Seyfried	Love the Coopers	Ruby
2015 (36th)	Amanda Seyfried	Pan	Mary
2016 (37th)
2016 (37th)	Kristen Wiig	Zoolander 2	Alexanya Atoz
2016 (37th)	Julianne Hough	Dirty Grandpa	Meredith Goldstein
2016 (37th)	Kate Hudson	Mother's Day	Jesse
2016 (37th)	Aubrey Plaza	Dirty Grandpa	Lenore
2016 (37th)	Jane Seymour	Fifty Shades of Black	Claire Black
2016 (37th)	Sela Ward	Independence Day: Resurgence	President Elizabeth Lanford
2017 (38th)
2017 (38th)	Kim Basinger	Fifty Shades Darker	Elena Lincoln
2017 (38th)	Sofia Boutella	The Mummy	Ahmanet
2017 (38th)	Laura Haddock	Transformers: The Last Knight	Viviane Wembly
2017 (38th)	Goldie Hawn	Snatched	Linda Middleton
2017 (38th)	Susan Sarandon	A Bad Moms Christmas	Isis Dunkler
2018 (39th)
2018 (39th)	Kellyanne Conway	Fahrenheit 11/9	Herself
2018 (39th)	Marcia Gay Harden	Fifty Shades Freed	Grace Trevelyan Grey
2018 (39th)	Kelly Preston	Gotti	Victoria Gotti
2018 (39th)	Jaz Sinclair	Slender Man	Chloe
2018 (39th)	Melania Trump	Fahrenheit 11/9	Herself
2019 (40th)
2019 (40th)	Rebel Wilson	Cats	Jennyanydots
2019 (40th)	Jessica Chastain	Dark Phoenix	Vuk
2019 (40th)	Cassi Davis	A Madea Family Funeral	Betty Ann "Aunt Bam" Murphy
2019 (40th)	Judi Dench	Cats	Old Deuteronomy
2019 (40th)	Fenessa Pineda	Rambo: Last Blood	Gizelle

=== 2020s ===
Year	Actress	Film	Character
2020 (41st)
2020 (41st)	Maddie Ziegler	Music	Music Gamble
2020 (41st)	Glenn Close	Hillbilly Elegy (also Oscar-nominated)	Bonnie "Mamaw" Vance
2020 (41st)	Lucy Hale	Fantasy Island	Melanie Cole
2020 (41st)	Maggie Q	Fantasy Island	Gwen Olsen
2020 (41st)	Kristen Wiig	Wonder Woman 1984	Barbara Minerva / Cheetah
2021 (42nd)
2021 (42nd)	Judy Kaye	Diana the Musical	Queen Elizabeth II & Barbara Cartland
2021 (42nd)	Amy Adams	Dear Evan Hansen	Cynthia Murphy
2021 (42nd)	Sophie Cookson	Infinite	Nora Brightman
2021 (42nd)	Erin Davie	Diana the Musical	Camilla Parker Bowles
2021 (42nd)	Taryn Manning	Every Last One of Them	Maggie
2022 (43rd)
2022 (43rd)	Adria Arjona	Morbius	Martine Bancroft
2022 (43rd)	Fan Bingbing	The 355	Lin Mi Sheng
2022 (43rd)	Fan Bingbing	The King's Daughter	The Mermaid
2022 (43rd)	Lorraine Bracco	Disney's Pinocchio	Sofia the Seagull (voice only)
2022 (43rd)	Penélope Cruz	The 355	Graciela Rivera
2022 (43rd)	Mira Sorvino	Lamborghini: The Man Behind the Legend	Annita
2023 (44th)
2023 (44th)	Megan Fox	Expend4bles	Gina
2023 (44th)	Kim Cattrall	About My Father	Tigger
2023 (44th)	Bai Ling	Johnny & Clyde	Zhang
2023 (44th)	Lucy Liu	Shazam! Fury of the Gods	Kalypso
2023 (44th)	Mary Stuart Masterson	Five Nights at Freddy's	Aunt Jane
2024 (45th)
2024 (45th)	Amy Schumer	Unfrosted	Marjorie Merriweather Post
2024 (45th)	Ariana DeBose	Argylle	Keira
2024 (45th)	Ariana DeBose	Kraven the Hunter	Calypso Ezili
2024 (45th)	Lesley-Anne Down	Reagan	Margaret Thatcher
2024 (45th)	Emma Roberts	Madame Web	Mary Parker
2024 (45th)	FKA Twigs	The Crow	Shelly Webster
2025 (46th)
2025 (46th)	Scarlet Rose Stallone	Gunslingers	Bella
2025 (46th)	Anna Chlumsky	Bride Hard	Virginia
2025 (46th)	Ema Horvath	The Strangers – Chapter 2	Shelly / Pin-Up Girl
2025 (46th)	Kacey Rohl	Star Trek: Section 31	Rachel Garrett
2025 (46th)	Isis Valverde	Alarum	Bridgette

== Multiple wins ==
2 wins

- Megan Fox (Teenage Mutant Ninja Turtles, Expend4bles)
- Paris Hilton (House of Wax, Repo! The Genetic Opera)
- Madonna (Four Rooms, Die Another Day)

== Multiple nominations ==
5 nominations

- Carmen Electra

4 nominations

- Kelly Preston

3 nominations

- Faye Dunaway
- Daryl Hannah
- Madonna
- Jenny McCarthy
- Sean Young

2 nominations

- Rutanya Alda
- Jessica Biel
- Colleen Camp
- Kim Cattrall
- Sofia Coppola
- Bo Derek
- Megan Fox
- Goldie Hawn
- Salma Hayek
- Mariel Hemingway
- Marilu Henner
- Paris Hilton
- Katie Holmes
- Amy Irving
- Kim Kardashian
- Jennifer Lopez
- Nicola Peltz
- Zelda Rubinstein
- Susan Sarandon
- Diana Scarwid
- Kristen Wiig
