= Rambo: Last Blood =

2019 film by Adrian Grünberg

- Theatrical release poster
- Directed by: Adrian Grünberg
- Screenplay by: Matthew Cirulnick; Sylvester Stallone
- Story by: Dan Gordon; Sylvester Stallone
- Based on: John Rambo by David Morrell
- Produced by: Avi Lerner; Kevin King Templeton; Yariv Lerner; Les Weldon
- Starring: Sylvester Stallone; Paz Vega; Sergio Peris-Mencheta; Adriana Barraza; Yvette Monreal; Genie Kim aka Yenah Han; Joaquín Cosío; Óscar Jaenada
- Cinematography: Brendan Galvin
- Edited by: Todd E. Miller; Carsten Kurpanek
- Music by: Brian Tyler
- Production companies: Balboa Productions; Dadi Film (HK) Ltd.; Millennium Media; Templeton Media; Campbell Grobman Films
- Distributed by: Lionsgate
- Release date: September 20, 2019
- Running time: 89 minutes (US, UK, Canada); 101 minutes (International)
- Country: United States
- Languages: English; Spanish
- Budget: $50 million
- Box office: $91.5 million

Rambo: Last Blood (Note: Also known as Rambo V and Rambo V: Last Blood. The film is also copyrighted by Rambo V Productions, Inc.) is a 2019 American vigilante action film written by and starring Sylvester Stallone as John Rambo. Directed by Adrian Grünberg, it is the sequel to Rambo (2008) and the fifth installment in the Rambo film series. The story follows Rambo traveling to Mexico to save his adopted niece, who has been kidnapped by a Mexican cartel and forced into prostitution. Paz Vega, Sergio Peris-Mencheta, Adriana Barraza, Yvette Monreal, Genie Kim aka Yenah Han, Joaquín Cosío, and Óscar Jaenada star in supporting roles.

Plans for a fifth film were announced on and off again since 2008, with different iterations developed and canceled. The film was finally announced in May 2018, with Grünberg attached to direct. Principal photography began in October 2018 in Bulgaria and Spain and ended in December 2018, with additional photography in May 2019. Brian Tyler returned to score the film.

Rambo: Last Blood was theatrically released by Lionsgate on September 20, 2019, to negative reviews from critics, who criticized its script, graphic violence, and perceived racist and xenophobic attitudes towards Mexico, though the action sequences and Stallone's performance were praised. The film grossed $91.5 million worldwide against a production budget of $50 million and print and advertisement costs of $30 million. A prequel film, John Rambo, is currently in production.

== Plot ==
Eleven years after returning home from Burma, (Note: As depicted in Rambo (2008)) John Rambo lives in Bowie, Arizona, at his deceased father's horse ranch, which he manages with his old friend Maria Beltran and her granddaughter Gabriela. Gabriela is told by her friend Gizelle that she has found Gabriela's deadbeat father, Manuel, in Mexico. Despite their protests, Gabriela travels to Mexico, and Gizelle takes her to Manuel's apartment. When Gabriela asks him why he abandoned her, he reveals that he never loved her and never wanted a child, breaking Gabriela's heart. Gizelle takes Gabriela to a nearby club, where she is drugged and kidnapped by the enforcers of a Mexican cartel.

After learning of Gabriela's disappearance, Rambo rushes to Mexico and interrogates Manuel and Gizelle about Gabriela's whereabouts. Gizelle reluctantly leads Rambo to the club where Gabriela was last seen, and Rambo confronts El Flaco, the man who last spoke with Gabriela. A mysterious woman named Carmen Delgado follows Rambo as El Flaco leads him to Gabriela's supposed location. Rambo is confronted, beaten, and marked by the cartel, led by brothers Hugo and Victor Martinez. They take his driver's license, revealing the location of the ranch and a photo of Gabriela, whom Victor recognizes. The cartel vows to mistreat Gabriela further due to Rambo's actions.

Carmen takes Rambo back to her home, where she cares for him until he fully recovers. Meanwhile, Gabriela is repeatedly dosed with heroin and sold into sexual slavery. Carmen says she is an independent journalist investigating the Martinez brothers, who were responsible for the death of Carmen's sister. Rambo later raids one of the brothels, killing several men until he finds a drugged Gabriela. While driving home, Rambo thanks Gabriela for giving him hope and meaning for the last ten years, but she dies from an overdose. An enraged Rambo sends Maria away, rigs the ranch with booby traps for a confrontation, and later returns to Mexico to ask for Carmen's help in finding Victor. Carmen initially refuses, telling Rambo it will solve nothing, but is convinced after he appeals to her grief and frustrations.

Rambo raids Victor's home, kills the guards, and decapitates Victor. Hugo leads a group of hitmen to Rambo's ranch, where the hitmen are killed through booby traps. Saving Hugo for last, Rambo uses his Bowie knife, cuts his chest open, and rips out his heart. In the battle's aftermath, a weakened Rambo sits on the porch of his father's house, vowing to continue fighting and keep the memories of his loved ones alive. Later, Rambo reminisces on his past battles (Note: As depicted in First Blood (1982), Rambo: First Blood Part II (1985), Rambo III (1988), and Rambo (2008)) as he saddles up his horse and leaves the ranch.

== Cast ==
- Sylvester Stallone as John Rambo
- Paz Vega as Carmen Delgado
- Sergio Peris-Mencheta as Hugo Martinez
- Adriana Barraza as Maria Beltran
- Yvette Monreal as Gabriela Beltran
- Genie Kim, aka Yenah Han, as Bar Patron
- Joaquín Cosío as Don Manuel
- Pascacio López as "El Flaco"
- Óscar Jaenada as Victor Martinez
- Fenessa Pineda as Gizelle
- Marco de la O as Manuel
- Rick Zingale as Don Miguel
- Manuel Uriza as Dr. Sergio
- Mirka Prieto as Lola / Laura
- Sheila Shah as Alejandra
- Jessica Madsen as Becky

Louis Mandylor and Aaron Cohen portrayed the Sheriff and State Police Captain in the opening scene of the extended cut, respectively.

== Production ==
=== Development and writing ===
In February 2008, Sylvester Stallone revealed that making a fifth film would depend on the success of the fourth film, stating he was "gearing one up" and that it would "be quite different". In March 2008, Stallone revealed he was "half-way through" writing Rambo V, stating that it would not be another war movie, with Bulgaria being considered to double as Rambo's home in Arizona. In February 2009, Stallone revealed that he was proceeding with the fifth film, but stated, "The conflict is whether to do it in America or a foreign country."

In August 2009, Millennium Films greenlit the film with Stallone writing, directing, and starring. At that time, the plot focused on Rambo battling human traffickers and drug lords to rescue a young girl abducted near the U.S.–Mexico border. In September 2009, Stallone revealed that the film was titled Rambo V: The Savage Hunt, and would instead be loosely based on the novel Hunter by James Byron Huggins. The plot was reconceptualized to focus on Rambo leading an elite special forces team to hunt and kill a genetically engineered creature. Nu Image/Millennium Films released a concept art poster, and official synopsis for The Savage Hunt. By November 2009 however, the plot had reverted to the story written by Stallone, involving Rambo crossing the Mexican border to rescue a girl who had been kidnapped.

In May 2010, Stallone revealed he was "done" with the character, stating, "I think Rambo's pretty well done. I don't think there'll be any more. I'm about 99% sure I was going to do it ... but I feel that with Rocky Balboa, that character came full circle. He went home. But for Rambo to go on another adventure might be, I think, misinterpreted as a mercenary gesture and not necessary. I don't want that to happen." At the 2010 Cannes Film Festival, Millennium Films and Nu Image advertised the film, now titled Rambo V, with handout poster cards. Despite this, Stallone stated that he wasn't involved with the created posters and that the studio had told him that if he doesn't make the film they'll find someone else to complete it. He stated he wanted the franchise to end, and expressed being comfortable with the idea.

In 2011, Sean Hood was hired to write a new script titled Rambo: Last Stand, which he described as "more in line with the small-town thriller of First Blood". In 2012, Hood revealed that Rambo V had been put on hold for Stallone to finish The Expendables 2. Hood also revealed his uncertainty on whether the film would be similar to Unforgiven or a "passing-of-the-torch". In August 2013, it was announced that Entertainment One and Nu Image would develop and produce a Rambo TV series with Stallone. In June 2014, German film company Splendid Films confirmed that Stallone had started writing the script for Rambo V, which he described as similar to No Country for Old Men. In September 2014, the film was officially titled Rambo: Last Blood, with Stallone also serving as director.

In 2015, Stallone and Rambo creator/author David Morrell re-wrote the story for Rambo V. Stallone wanted a "soulful journey" for the character that the author described as a "really emotional, powerful story". Stallone pitched the idea to the producers, but they wanted to proceed with the human trafficking story instead, leaving Stallone and Morrell's script abandoned. In October 2015, Stallone expressed interest in a prequel project, stating: "It's intriguing to find the whys and wherefores of how people have become what they are. The traumas, the loss, and the tragedy of being in Vietnam would certainly be a great challenge for a young actor, and it would be ironic that Rambo directs younger Rambo, having played it for twenty years plus." By January 2016, Stallone stated that Rambo V would not enter production.

=== Pre-production ===
In May 2018, the film was re-announced to be in development initially as Rambo V, with principal photography scheduled for September. The plot was confirmed to focus on Rambo combating a Mexican drug cartel following their abduction of one of his family members. Stallone announced the release date for the film, which he would also be co-writing with Matthew Cirulnick. At that time, he expressed uncertainty about additionally serving as director. In August 2018, Adrian Grünberg was announced as the director. In September 2018, Adriana Barraza was added to the cast. In October 2018, Paz Vega, Yvette Monreal, Sergio Peris-Mencheta, Óscar Jaenada, and Joaquín Cosío were cast. In May 2019, Louis Mandylor, Sheila Shah, Dimitri Vegas, and Genie Kim (aka Yenah Han) were revealed to have been cast without prior announcement.

=== Filming ===
Principal photography began on October 2, 2018, in Bulgaria. It was previously scheduled to begin on September 1, 2018, and before that on October 27, 2014, in Shreveport, Louisiana. Barraza filmed her scenes in Tenerife (Canary Islands). Principal photography was completed on December 4, 2018. Additional photography took place at the end of May 2019.

== Music ==
Brian Tyler, who composed for Stallone on Rambo, The Expendables, The Expendables 2 and The Expendables 3 returned to score Rambo: Last Blood. Tyler shared his scoring process with Dread Central:

Rambo: Last Blood is a very emotional story, and the music needed to reflect the tone that the director, Adrian Grunberg, set so beautifully. I wrote a series of heartfelt and passionate themes that echo Rambo's yearning for family, justice, requital, and compassion. These ideas created a tonal tension that was both challenging and rewarding as a composer. Lush strings, massive brass, thunderous percussion, delicate piano, and harrowing trumpet duets echoed the themes of loss, regret, hope, and vengeance. It has been an incredible ride composing for this timeless character.

== Release ==
=== Marketing ===
In May 2018, Millennium Films brought the project to Cannes to generate interest and sales. Stallone verified that he would share images and videos from the film's set on his Instagram as the film approached its release. In February 2019, Stallone revealed images on his Instagram of Rambo's adopted family, combat history, and the character Gabriela's intentions to travel to Mexico to find her father. In March 2019, Stallone revealed via his Instagram an image of Rambo covered in blood and aiming his signature bow.

In May 2019, it was revealed that Stallone will present exclusive images at Cannes to coincide with a special "first-look" screening of the film at the Palais des Festivals et des Congrès on May 24, 2019. The first trailer was revealed at Cannes on May 24, 2019. The teaser trailer was released on May 30, 2019 and drew comparisons to Logan and Unforgiven. A remixed version of the song "Old Town Road" was used for the teaser. On August 1, 2019, Stallone revealed the theatrical release poster on his Instagram. On August 20, 2019, Stallone released the second trailer on his Instagram. On September 4, 2019, Alamo Drafthouse Cinema announced it would host a marathon of all five Rambo films to commemorate the release of Rambo: Last Blood. Deadline Hollywood reported that P&A costs were under $30 million.

=== Theatrical ===
Rambo: Last Blood was released theatrically in the United States on September 20, 2019. Dadi purchased the Chinese distribution rights and agreed to an eight-figure co-financing deal. On July 30, 2019, the MPAA assigned the film an R rating. The British Board of Film Classification classified the film at 18. The film was released theatrically in Japan on June 26, 2020, by Gaga Corporation.

=== International version ===
Lionsgate released two different theatrical cuts of Rambo: Last Blood, varying by country. In the United States, United Kingdom, and Canada, the film runs 89 minutes; in Australia, Mexico, Sweden, Brazil, Finland, Germany, and Japan, it runs 101 minutes. The latter version contains several deleted scenes and an alternate opening, which runs approximately 10 minutes:

It starts in a rainstorm in the middle of a rescue: 3 missing hikers in danger of getting caught in a flood. The police say they have to stop the search as it's getting too dangerous and ask where the volunteer on horseback is. We are then introduced to Rambo in the woods tracking the hikers. He finds a girl dead, and then further down finds the other two. He's trying to get them out, but one guy won't leave without his wife. Rambo tells him she's dead, but he runs off, the flood water starts running down, and Rambo ties himself and the girl to a rock while the initial rush of water cascades over them. He then returns to the base with the girl and sees the guy who ran off getting his body bag loaded into an ambulance which triggers his PTSD, the girl thanks him and Rambo returns home and has a conversation with the old lady living in the house about when he returned and how his father used to sit in the rocking chair outside. He then goes into the tunnels, upset about the events, and puts a CD on (The Doors). … When he has PTSD flashbacks in the tunnels, it is intercut with the dead hiker.

After the alternate opening, the film cuts to Rambo on his ranch, as it begins in select North American countries and the UK.

=== Home media ===
Rambo: Last Blood was released on Digital on December 3, 2019, and was released on Ultra HD Blu-ray, Blu-ray, and DVD on December 17, 2019, by Lionsgate Home Entertainment. Best Buy released a retail exclusive steel book for the 4K UHD release. The film has topped Redbox's disc rental and On Demand charts for several weeks. The international version, titled Rambo: Last Blood Extended Cut, was released on Amazon Prime Video in May 2020. In the United States and Canada, the DVD earned $10 million and the Blu-ray earned $16.6 million, totaling $26.6 million in domestic video sales.

== Reception ==
=== Box office ===
Rambo: Last Blood grossed $44.8 million in the United States and Canada, and $46.7 million in other territories, for a worldwide total of $91.5 million, against a production budget of $50 million.

In the United States and Canada, the film was released alongside Ad Astra and Downton Abbey, and was projected to gross $23–25 million from 3,618 theaters in its opening weekend. The film made $7.17 million on Friday, which included $1.3 million from Thursday night previews. It went on to debut to $19 million, finishing third and marking the second-best opening of the series. The film made $8.6 million in its second weekend and $3.6 million in its third, finishing sixth and eighth, respectively.

=== Critical response ===
On Rotten Tomatoes, the film has an approval rating of 26% based on 173 reviews, with an average rating of 4/10. The site's critical consensus states, "Like the sequels that preceded it, Rambo: Last Blood is content to indulge in bloody violence at the expense of its main character's once-poignant story." Metacritic, which uses a weighted average, assigned the film a score of 26 out of 100, based on 31 critics, indicating "generally unfavorable" reviews. Audiences polled by CinemaScore gave the film an average grade of "B" on an A+ to F scale, while those surveyed by PostTrak gave it an average 3.5 out of 5 stars and a 56% "definite recommend".

The portrayal of the Rambo character was put under scrutiny. Writing for the Los Angeles Times, Kenneth Turan gave the film 3 out of 4 stars and was complimentary of the story's "surprisingly brooding examination" of Rambo: "Sure, Rambo is convincing when he ends up telling bad people, 'I'm gonna hurt you real bad', but there is also a kind of fragility that makes us worry about people putting the hurt on him." Peter Debruge wrote a negative review for Variety: "This character is a mess of contradictions, representing, on one hand, the permanent damage that military service can do to one's soul while simultaneously suggesting what the ideal soldier looks like." Rating the film 4.5 out of 10 for IGN, Witney Seibold lamented, "A character who was originally meant to stand as a symbol for the damage that war can do to a soldier is now best remembered as an unkillable human machine gun", but credited Stallone with "[managing] to give as soulful a performance as the part warrants".

The script by Stallone and Matthew Cirulnick received unfavorable reactions. In a negative review for The Hollywood Reporter, Frank Scheck said it "feels utterly tossed-off and generic, more resembling the pilot for a Rambo television series than a proper send off", but credited Stallone with "[keeping] a franchise afloat". Katie Walsh of the Chicago Tribune, who gave the film 1 out of 4 stars, called the script "barely a script at all" and the writing lazy; she added that story writers Stallone and Dan Gordon "trade on charged imagery rather than, you know, actually writing characters that fully express the spectrum of human morality". William Bibbiani of Bloody Disgusting said the script "has been reduced to its lowest common denominators, establishing characters quickly and then shoving them into a simplistic plot (that is to say, simplistic even by Rambo standards)", and rated the film 1.5 out of 5. Grading the film a D+ for IndieWire, Eric Kohn said Stallone as a co-writer "does a decent job at generating empathy for Rambo through furtive gestures, but Last Blood goes overboard to prove that he's tried to be a better man". While many called the plot of Last Blood derivative of Taken, web-based critic James Berardinelli called it "a Death Wish variant with a few callbacks to the trap-building of First Blood".

Critics reported being appalled by the brutality of the action scenes, with some comparing its amount of gore with that of a slasher film. Berardinelli said, "The body count is insanely high and the methods of death are worthy of a Halloween or Friday the 13th sequel", and gave the film 1 out of 4 stars. Debruge called the violence "horrible, gut-wrenching carnage to witness, and yet, it's been calibrated to elicit whoops and cheers from fans, who've faithfully followed along as Rambo evolved". Vince Mancini of Uproxx said, "It's so genuinely horrific I'm convinced there are real-life cartel videos celebrating the torture of rivals that are less gory", but recommended the film as a must-see. Conversely, Johnny Oleksinski of the New York Post said, "Rambo: Last Blood features what's easily the most violent movie scene of the year. It's awesome", but felt the narration, drama, and hackneyed backstory could have been edited out. Duncan Bowles of Den of Geek gave it 3 out of 5 stars, writing: "If you're not the kind of person who wants to weep with joy at the sight of Rambo tooling up, firing a bow, or rigging booby traps, then the film really isn't for you, but if you're after a solid display of carnage from a character you love, then there's plenty on offer." Many saw the climax of Last Blood as similar to that of Home Alone, which, by contrast, is rated PG.

The depiction of a crime infested Mexico and the stereotypical portrayal of most Mexicans and Latinos as criminals prompted critics to accuse the film of xenophobia and pandering to supporters of the Trump presidency. Peter Bradshaw of The Guardian called Last Blood a "massively enlarged prostate of a film [that] can only make you wince with its badly acted geronto-ultraviolence, its Trumpian fantasies of Mexican rapists and hilariously insecure US border, and its crass enthusiasm for rape-revenge attacks", giving it 1 out of 5 stars. Seibold wrote: "I understand that Rambo films have rarely been bastions of cultural togetherness, but in 2019, these broad stereotypes are offensive and dated and downright irresponsible." Kohn wrote: "In 2019's hypersensitive cultural environment, the depiction of murderous Mexican crime bosses and their cowering sex slaves encountering a literal white savior doesn't go down so easy." Mexican film critic Gerardo Valero, a "far-flung correspondent" for RogerEbert.com, also criticized the use of Spain doubling for Mexico, and that it was "impossible not to laugh at this group of Spanish actors trying to sound Mexican by cursing with every other word in this strange accent". He also wrote: "If this movie wasn't so dumb, I would have probably found all of this offensive." Addressing the complaints about the stereotypical villains, however, Bowles wrote: "The villains might be built from the stereotypical strain of pure evil from years past, but their reprehensibility is what makes the explosive payback work and the violence, despite some especially grim moments, never quite strays into the extreme stomach-churning highs from part IV."

David Morrell, creator of the Rambo character and author of the First Blood novel, tweeted that he disliked Rambo: Last Blood, calling it "a mess" and feeling "embarrassed to have my name associated with it". Morrell later told Newsweek:

I felt degraded and dehumanized after I left the theater. Instead of being soulful, this new movie lacks one. I felt I was less a human being for having seen it, and today that's an unfortunate message ... [Trackdown] is typical of ultra-violent 1970s exploitation "grindhouse" films, the technique of which Rambo: Last Blood resembles. The sets here look cheap. The direction is awkward. ... Rambo could be called John Smith, and the film wouldn't change. It assumes the audience is familiar with Rambo's background, whereas anyone under 40 will wonder what on Earth is going on with those tunnels.

=== Analysis ===
Darren Mooney of The Escapist wrote, "Rambo has adopted the methodology of the Viet Cong by building elaborate tunnels under his family farm." Zak Wojnar of Screen Rant stated that "Rambo's tunnels are much larger and more sanitary than those of Củ Chi, but the imagery is comparable", adding that they are "where he holds his demons, where he channels his negative energy, and where he keeps his past close, but contained". As for the final act of the film, Wojnar stated that "his 'PTSD Tunnels' play a key role in his revenge", writing, "Using the same guerilla tactics that were likely used on him and his friends fifty years ago, Rambo emerges from his tunnels like a Vietnamese fighter popping out of a spider hole, shoots several targets, and then disappears underground before they even know what hit them."

=== Accolades ===
List of awards and nominations for Rambo: Last Blood
Award	Date of Ceremony	Category	Recipient(s)	Result
National Film & TV Awards	December 3, 2019	Best Actor	Sylvester Stallone	Nominated
National Film & TV Awards	December 3, 2019	Best Supporting Actress	Yvette Monreal	Won
National Film & TV Awards	December 3, 2019	Best Feature Film		Nominated
National Film & TV Awards	December 3, 2019	Best Director	Adrian Grünberg	Nominated
National Film & TV Awards	December 3, 2019	Best Action Movie		Won
Golden Raspberry Awards	March 16, 2020	Worst Picture	Avi Lerner, Kevin King Templeton, Yariv Lerner & Les Weldon	Nominated
Golden Raspberry Awards	March 16, 2020	Worst Director	Adrian Grünberg	Nominated
Golden Raspberry Awards	March 16, 2020	Worst Actor	Sylvester Stallone	Nominated
Golden Raspberry Awards	March 16, 2020	Worst Supporting Actress	Fenessa Pineda	Nominated
Golden Raspberry Awards	March 16, 2020	Worst Screen Combo	Sylvester Stallone & his impotent rage	Nominated
Golden Raspberry Awards	March 16, 2020	Worst Screenplay	Matthew Cirulnick & Sylvester Stallone	Nominated
Golden Raspberry Awards	March 16, 2020	Worst Prequel, Remake, Rip-off or Sequel		Won
Golden Raspberry Awards	March 16, 2020	Worst Reckless Disregard for Human Life and Public Property		Won
Shorty Awards	May 3, 2020	Best in Entertainment	Rambo: Last Blood Home Entertainment Social Campaign	Nominated

== Prequel ==
During Cannes 2019, Stallone said he would continue portraying Rambo if the fifth film succeeds. Grünberg, however, said that Rambo: Last Blood "closes the circle", hoping it would conclude the film series. In September 2019, Stallone confirmed that he has plans for a prequel to the series; although he would not reprise the title role, he would like to explore who Rambo was before the Vietnam War:

I always thought of Rambo when he was 16 or 17—I hope they can do the prequel—he was the best person you could find. He was the captain of the team; he was the most popular kid in school; a super athlete. He was like Jim Thorpe, and the war is what changed him. If you saw him before, he was like the perfect guy.

In September 2019, Stallone had expressed interest in having Rambo take refuge in an Indian reservation for a potential sixth film. In June 2020, Stallone briefly elaborated on the idea, stating, "If I ever did another one, I think he would go back to the Indian reservation that he grew up on because he has Indian family."

However, in a September 2023 convention appearance, Stallone cast doubt on a sixth film, joking that Rambo would just be fighting arthritis.

In May 2025, it was announced that Millennium Media was producing a prequel film to First Blood titled John Rambo. Jalmari Helander, known for the 2022 film Sisu, has been attached to direct the film, while Stallone was not expected to be involved with the film in any capacity. The director shared:

I have been the biggest fan of Rambo since the age of 11. It is so surreal to be in a situation where I can actually make my own Rambo movie. The chain of events that got me here makes, fantastically, my whole childhood make sense. I can’t wait to bring the greatest action hero back to the big screen where he belongs.

In August 2025, actor Noah Centineo was cast as John Rambo. In March 2026, Stallone joined as an executive producer.
