= Hunter (Huggins novel) =

1999 American science fiction novel by James Byron Huggins

- First edition dust jacket cover
- Author: James Byron Huggins
- Illustrator: Sam Potts
- Language: English
- Genre: Science fiction
- Publisher: Simon & Schuster
- Publication date: 1999
- Publication place: United States
- Pages: 432 (first edition)
- ISBN: 978-0-684-84461-9

Hunter is a 1999 American science fiction novel by James Byron Huggins. Hunter was re-released in 2018. The novel was followed by the sequels Hunter's Moon and Last Hunt, both released in 2025 via WildBlue Press.

== Plot ==
Nathaniel Hunter, an expert tracker, with his wolf companion Ghost, finds a child lost in a snow storm. Deep in the Arctic Circle, a facility is attacked by a hulking creature. Colonel Maddox, Major Westcott, and the mysterious Dixon, consult with Dr. Tipler to identify the footprints and carnage left behind by the beast. Dr. Tipler deduces the creature kills similar to a grizzly but the footprints do not match that of a bear and recommends seeking the help of Hunter.

The trio seek Hunter's help and he too is unable to identify the species. Colonel Maddox asks Hunter to lead a kill team to track and kill the beast. Hunter is initially hesitant but accepts the job. Hunter meets the kill team led by Commander Takakura. Against Hunter's wishes, Dr. Tipler also joins the team as an observer. Bobbi Jo, the team's sniper, is assigned to lead the hunt alongside Hunter, whom which she bonds with over the course of the journey.

In Washington, the United States Marshals Service assigns Chaney the task to investigate the ravaged facilities in the Arctic Circle. Chaney consults with his former mentor Brick about the assignment, both feeling uneasy how things do not add up. Back at Dr. Tipler's institute, his assistants Gina and Rebecca examine a cast made from the creature's footprints. They recover a tendril from the plaster and Rebecca attempts to have the CIA's physicist Dr. Hamilton examine it.

Rebecca stresses that whatever the animal is, it is immune to disease but Dr. Hamilton shrugs off her theories and after she leaves, orders a hit on her. Rebecca is then killed in a car accident. Hunter and the team find the creature but the mission backfires when the beast begins hunting them and kills several soldiers. Dr. Tipler becomes sick, and the team is unable to radio for an extraction due to sabotage. Hunter decides to lead the creature away from the team so they can escape, and manages to hurt the beast with his Bowie knife. He eventually regroups with the team and leads them into a mine to take shelter. The creature reaches the mine and Hunter hurts it once more with the Bowie knife.

Chaney interviews both Dr. Hamilton and Dixon about the ravaged facilities, but is only given vague answers. He eventually talks to Gina, who strongly believes Rebecca was murdered. Chaney breaks into Dr. Hamilton's house to find clues and finds an article about a strange hulking creature retrieved from ice during the 1970s. Chaney is then attacked by a hit squad but manages to neutralize them and heads to Brick's bar for help. They later go to the Tipler Institute to save Gina from another hit squad. Afterwards, they head to the last facility in the Arctic where Dr. Hamilton left to.

Hunter and the team reach a cavern where they know the creature is waiting for them. The beast speaks to Hunter, who reveals its name to be “Luther”. After shaking off the beast, Hunter and the team manage to escape and reach the last facility, where Colonel Maddox waits for them. Dr. Hamilton and his team have another creature, long dead, stored deep within the facility. They manage to synthesize a serum that maintains the creature's longevity without turning one into a beast themselves, similar to what happened to Luther.

Dr. Hamilton attempts to test this on Dr. Tipler but is stopped by Ghost. Hunter keeps the serum, knowing that it's something Dr. Hamilton doesn't want anyone to know about. Chaney and Brick arrive at the base and interviews Hunter and the team about their encounter with the creature. Dr. Tipler theorizes that the creature is an ancient smilodon. Dr. Hamilton gives Chaney a tour of the facility, while Hunter sneaks into the deep part of the base storing the other creature. Hunter finds a video of Luther injecting himself with a serum and turning into the smilodon-like creature that he and the team encountered.

Dr. Hamilton and his security team catch Hunter, and reveals that the operation is an attempt to make certain members of society immortal in order to control and shape the world from the shadows. Brick arrives and opens fire on the security team. Hunter knocks out Dr. Hamilton and destroys the dead creature. Up above, the Luther-creature arrives and attacks the facility. Dr. Tipler dies from a heart attack and Ghost dies battling the creature. Bobbi Jo manages to wound the beast with her Beretta Sniper enough for it to retreat. Dixon arrives with a kill team of his own, planning to tie loose ends by bombing the area, along with Hunter and the survivors.

Hunter threatens to destroy the synthesized serum if Dixon doesn't pull out his kill team. Dixon reluctantly complies but upon learning of Dr. Tipler's death, Hunter slashes the serum and forces Dixon into a helicopter, leaving Dr. Hamilton behind to be killed in the bombing. Hunter and the survivors intend on following the creature and kill it once and for all. They follow the creature to a cave and discover that it is the grave site of the species, who murdered each other in blind, cannibalistic rage. Brick, Takakura, and Dixon die in the final battle with the creature. Hunter sets the beast on fire and decapitates him with his Bowie knife. Hunter, Chaney, and Bobbi Jo leave the cave and are evacuated by the US Marshals, who arrest Dr. Hamilton who survived the aerial bombing.

== Film adaptation ==
In September 2009, Sylvester Stallone acquired the film rights to Hunter to use as the basis for Rambo: Last Blood, at the time titled Rambo V: The Savage Hunt. Shortly after, Nu Image/Millennium Films released a concept poster and synopsis for Rambo V: The Savage Hunt. In November 2009, it was reported that the plot had reverted to Rambo crossing the Mexican border to rescue a girl from human traffickers. In October 2018, Stallone revealed plans to adapt Hunter into its own feature film with Balboa Productions producing.
