= Adrian Grünberg =

Mexican film director and screenwriter (born 1975)

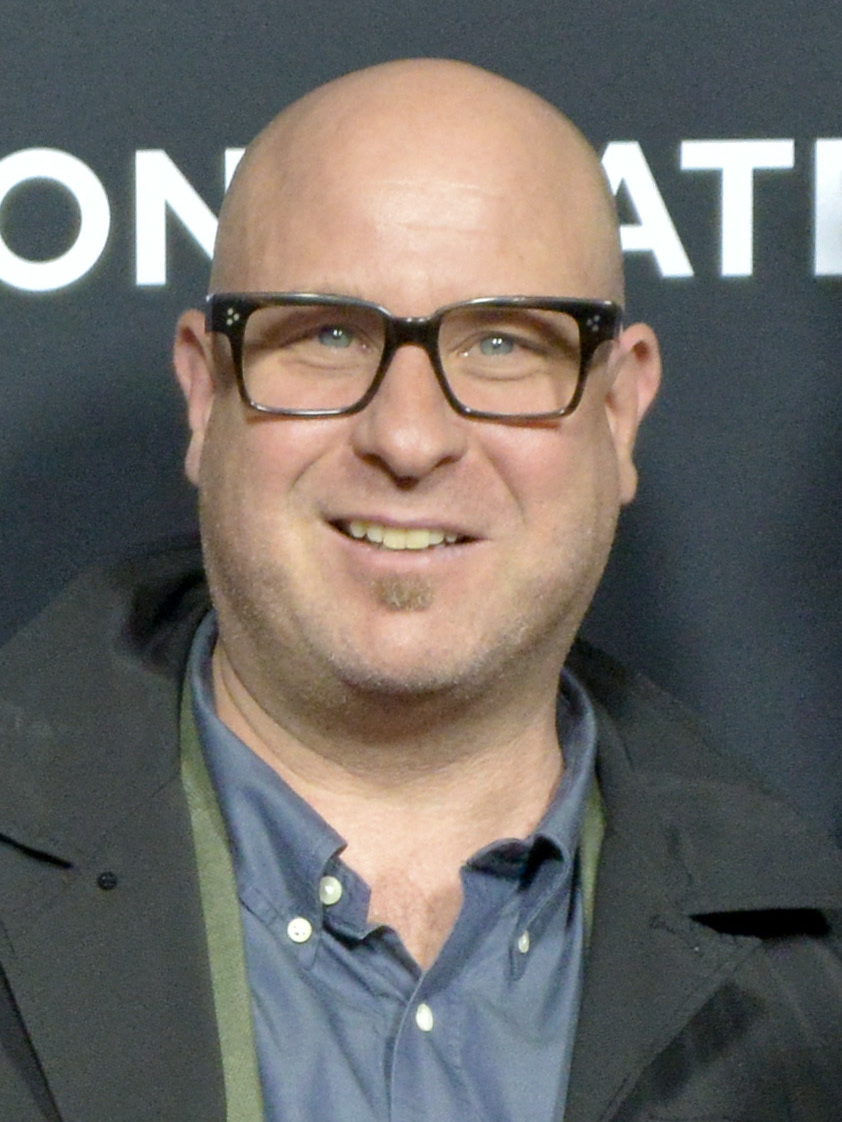
- Grünberg in 2019
- Born: Mexico

Adrian Grünberg is a Mexican filmmaker.

Before becoming a director, Grünberg worked as first assistant director for films like Apocalypto (2006), Wall Street: Money Never Sleeps (2010), Edge of Darkness (2010), and Jack Reacher: Never Go Back (2016).

== Filmography ==
=== Film ===
Year	Title	Director	Executive producer	Writer
2012	Get the Gringo	Yes	No	Yes
2019	Rambo: Last Blood	Yes	No	No
2023	The Black Demon	Yes	Yes	No
2025	Protector	Yes	Yes	No

=== Television ===
Year	Title	Director	Executive producer	Notes
2018	Here on Earth	Yes	No	Episode "Persona protegida"
2021	Luis Miguel: The Series	Yes	No	3 episode
2024	Bandidos	Yes	Yes	5 episodes
2025	Los Gringo Hunters	Yes	Yes	4 episodes

== Accolades ==
Year	Award	Category	Title	Result
2019	Golden Raspberry Awards	Worst Director	Rambo: Last Blood	Nominated
