= James Byron Huggins =

American thriller writer (born 1959)

James Byron Huggins (born August 14, 1959) is an American thriller writer currently being published by WildBlue Press.

Huggins has a bachelor's degree in journalism and English Literature from Troy State University.

== Works ==
- A Wolf Story (1993)
- The Reckoning (1994)
- Leviathan (1995)
- Cain (1997)
- Hunter (1999)
- Rora (2001)
- Nightbringer (2004)
- The Scam (2006)
- Sorcerer (2006)
- Dark Visions (2018)
- Crux (2019)
- Hunter's Moon (2025)
- Last Hunt (2025)
