= Living Eyes =

Living Eyes may refer to:

- Living Eyes (Radio Birdman album), 1981
- Living Eyes (Bee Gees album), 1981
  - "Living Eyes" (song), a single by the Bee Gees from the album of the same name
