= I Still Love You (Bee Gees song) =

Single by Bee Gees

from the album Living Eyes
- Released: November 1981
- Recorded: February – June 1981
- Length: 4:24
- Label: RSO
- Songwriter(s): Barry, Robin & Maurice Gibb
- Producer(s): Barry Gibb, Robin Gibb, Maurice Gibb, Albhy Galuten, Karl Richardson

Bee Gees B-sides singles chronology
"He's a Liar (Instrumental Version)" (1981)	"I Still Love You" (1981)	"The Woman In You (Instrumental Version)" (1983)

"I Still Love You" is a song by the Bee Gees primarily written by Barry, Robin & Maurice Gibb. It was released as a double A side of "Living Eyes" and on the album Living Eyes. Produced by the Gibb brothers with Albhy Galuten and Karl Richardson.

The song included in the compilations, Bee Gees (1999) Bee Gees Mix and Love Hits (1987).

== Background ==
"I Still Love You" is a song written by Barry, Robin and Maurice Gibb in 1981. Robin Gibb sings lead on this track, he also sings harmony with Maurice doing upper and lower register harmonies on the chorus and the second verse. The song ends with a high fret tone. Chuck Kirkpatrick plays sitar and rhodes organ while Ralph McDonald plays percussion. On its intro it features the orchestra backing and Chuck Kirkpatrick's Rhodes organ.

Music critic Joe Viglione at Allmusic described this song as Robin Gibb in Bee Gees form with lush arrangements and production.

== Personnel ==
- Robin Gibb — lead and harmony vocals
- Barry Gibb — guitar, harmony vocals
- Maurice Gibb — guitar, secondary vocals
- Richard Tee — piano
- Chuck Kirkpatrick — Rhodes organ, sitar
- Harold Cowart — bass
- Steve Gadd — drums
- Ralph McDonald — percussion
