= Paradise (Bee Gees song) =

Song by Bee Gees

from the album Living Eyes
- Released: 1981
- Recorded: February – June 1981
- Genre: Soft rock, art rock
- Length: 4:18
- Label: RSO
- Songwriter(s): Barry, Robin & Maurice Gibb
- Producer(s): Barry Gibb, Robin Gibb, Maurice Gibb, Albhy Galuten, Karl Richardson

"Paradise" is a pop ballad recorded by the Bee Gees included on the 1981 album Living Eyes. It was later released as a single in Netherlands and Japan with "Nothing Could Be Good" as the B-side. It was included on the 1983 greatest hits album Gold & Diamonds.

== Background ==
It was one of the ballads in the album and to feature the Gibb brothers singing harmony including "Don't Fall in Love with Me" and "I Still Love You". It was written and composed by Barry, Robin and Maurice Gibb. Barry and Maurice on acoustic guitars while Don Felder of Eagles on electric guitar, piano by George Bitzer, synthesizer by Albhy Galuten and drums by Steve Gadd. Barry and Robin Gibb sings lead vocals together.

== Personnel ==
- Barry Gibb — lead vocals, acoustic guitar
- Robin Gibb — lead vocals
- Maurice Gibb — acoustic guitar
- Don Felder — electric guitar
- Albhy Galuten — synthesizer
- Richard Tee — piano
- Harold Cowart — bass
- Steve Gadd — drums
- George Bitzer — piano
