= Staying Alive (soundtrack) =

Staying Alive: The Original Motion Picture Soundtrack

Soundtrack album by the Bee Gees and various artists
- Released: June 1983
- Recorded: 1982–1983; 1977 for "Stayin' Alive"
- Studio: Middle Ear, Inc. Studios, Miami; Château d'Hérouville, France ("Stayin' Alive"); Westlake Recording Studios, Los Angeles; Ocean Way Studios, L.A.; Smoke Tree Studios, L.A.; Record Plant, L.A.; Pasha Studios, L.A.
- Genre: R&B; Pop rock
- Length: 45:29
- Label: RSO Records; PolyGram
- Producer: Bee Gees; Karl Richardson; Albhy Galuten; Johnny Mandel; Stewart Levine; Bruce Stephen Foster; Tony Marolda; Randy Bishop

Bee Gees chronology
Living Eyes (1981)	Staying Alive: The Original Motion Picture Soundtrack (1983)	E.S.P. (1987)

Singles from Staying Alive: Original Motion Picture Soundtrack
- 1. "The Woman in You" Released: May 1983; 2. "Someone Belonging to Someone" Released: July 1983; 3. "Far from Over" Released: July 1983"; 4. "I'm Never Gonna Give You Up" Released: January 1984

Staying Alive: The Original Motion Picture Soundtrack is the soundtrack album to the 1983 film Staying Alive, the sequel to 1977's Saturday Night Fever. Released in June 1983 (a month before the film's premiere), it was issued by RSO Records and distributed by PolyGram.

The record's first side features five new songs by the Bee Gees, while the second one includes four tracks co-written by Frank Stallone, the younger brother of the film's director, Sylvester Stallone. These latter tracks are performed by Frank Stallone, Cynthia Rhodes, and Tommy Faragher, with Stallone and Rhodes also acting in the film.

The soundtrack features two singles that reached the top 30 in the Billboard Hot 100 chart, "Far From Over" and "The Woman in You", which peaked at numbers 10 and 24, respectively. It also spent 20 weeks on the Billboard 200 chart, peaking at number 6, and was nominated for Best Album of Original Score Written for a Motion Picture or a Television Special at the 1984 Grammy Awards. Staying Alive was the last album released under the RSO label.

== Background ==
After the release of Living Eyes, the Bee Gees decided to take a break and focus on other projects. During the second half of 1982, they contributed to Dionne Warwick's Heartbreaker album, and began work on what would become Kenny Rogers' Eyes That See in the Dark. At the same time, Robin started work on his second solo album, How Old Are You?, with assistance from Maurice.

It was during this period that Robert Stigwood approached the Bee Gees and asked them to record new songs for the upcoming Staying Alive film, the sequel to Saturday Night Fever. Stigwood, who had been planning the sequel since the original's highly successful release in 1977, contacted the group about halfway through the film's production. Their contributions to the soundtrack fulfilled their final contractual obligation with RSO Records, and the album became the label's last release.

The film's director, Sylvester Stallone, had been reviewing tapes submitted by a variety of artists from across the country, including some from his younger brother Frank Stallone. Frank had previously composed songs for films his brother had worked on, such as the first three Rocky movies and Paradise Alley, and had even appeared as a street-corner singer in Rocky.

== Recording and composition ==
In 1982, while the film's script was still being "polished", Frank Stallone and some musician friends "holed up in a 'garage in the (San Fernando) valley' with 'a $40 that was always breaking" to record 12 or 13 songs in hopes that one might be selected for the film by his older brother, director Sylvester Stallone. During filming, Frank frequently brought Sylvester new mixes of his tracks, which Frank described as "straight-ahead music", though some had "a harder edge than just pop." Despite accusations of nepotism, the song selection process was actually conducted anonymously, as Frank later recalled:

"[Sylvester] played my tapes for Stigwood and his associates, without telling them who composed the music, because none of them really wanted me working on the picture. When they said it was great, [Sylvester] told them, 'It's my brother,' and they were kind of caught."

Out of the songs that Frank co-wrote, nine were featured in the film, while four made it onto the album. "Far from Over", which he co-wrote with Vince DiCola and performed solo, was released as a single in July, a few days before the film's premiere, and was featured prominently throughout. At around the time that Frank Stallone was working on his material, the Bee Gees were also in the process of creating music for the movie, in anticipation of being asked to. The next year, between February and March 1983, the group gathered at Middle Ear Studio in Miami Beach and cut five new songs. Talking about their contributions to the soundtrack, Maurice said:

"It is five years later and, to us, the script projected the '80s. So we went for a totally different kind of energy in the score. Because of [Tony Manero's] outlook in this film, the music is more brutal."

While the Bee Gees were working on their new tracks, Sylvester Stallone visited them at the studio and stayed somewhat involved in the process. Robin revealed that Sylvester was "in touch by and large with the process of the writing". He also mentioned that Sylvester called them several times to say "what he wanted here and there ... in different parts of the music." Despite this, the brothers still expressed some dissatisfaction with how directors handled music, with Barry saying that it would be "nice" if the composers and filmmakers could "actually sit down at the same table long before the film gets made, and discuss how the music will be treated or how the film will be made compared to the music."

None of the songs from Saturday Night Fever were included on the sequel's soundtrack, except for an edited version of "Stayin' Alive", which was Side one's sixth and final track. The Bee Gees also recorded a sixth song during the Staying Alive sessions, titled "River of Souls", that still remains unreleased. Intended for film's final dance sequence, it has been described as "a terrific number, the music changing several times, building in intensity, with two main melodies and an instrumental section."

Along with the Bee Gees' contributions, it was reported at the start of 1983 that Sylvester Stallone had invited the Australian band Sherbet to write songs for the movie, and that Dionne Warwick had contributed a love song that she sang with Frank Stallone. However, if these recordings were actually made or finished, they went unused in the final soundtrack.

== Release ==
Staying Alive: The Original Motion Picture Soundtrack was released in June 1983, and promoted with four singles. "The Woman in You", was issued in May 1983 as the album's lead single, and peaked at number 24 on the Billboard Hot 100 chart, while also reaching numbers 23 and 26 in Germany and the Netherlands, respectively. It was also released as a 12-inch single with a medley of Saturday Night Fever songs titled "Saturday Night Mix" as its B-side.

The album's second single, "Someone Belonging to Someone", followed in July, peaking at number 49 in both the US and the UK, and featuring at number 30 in the Dutch charts. The third single, "Far From Over" was also released in July, a few days before the film opened, and spent two weeks at number 10 on the US Hot 100. The final single, "I'm Never Gonna Give You Up", a duet between Frank Stallone and Cynthia Rhodes, was released in January 1984 and reached number 16 in the Adult Contemporary chart.

A special edition of the soundtrack was later made available that consisted of two discs: one of the original album with six bonus tracks from the film, and a second disc that contained dance remixes of eight of the album's songs.

== Commercial performance and nominations ==
The Staying Alive soundtrack sold 4.5 million copies worldwide, and was certified platinum by the RIAA on August 30, 1983. It spent 20 weeks on the Billboard 200 chart, peaking at number 6.

The album was nominated for Best Album of Original Score Written for a Motion Picture or a Television Special at the 1984 Grammy Awards, and its highest-charting song in the US, "Far From Over", was nominated for Best Original Song - Motion Picture at the 41st Golden Globe Awards.

== Critical reception ==
Professional ratings
Review scores
Source	Rating
AllMusic	3/5 stars

On May 28, 1983, Billboard observed that with "The Woman in You", "the rock-dance synthesis" the Bee Gees had "perfected" in Saturday Night Fever still retained its "powerful appeal." The following week, on June 4, Cashbox wrote that the track provided "an excellent barometer of the changes and similarities in dance music" since Saturday Night Fever, adding that while "the keyboards, horns and funk beat" made for a "tougher sound", the result was "equally tuneful."

That same month, Michael Lawson of The Canadian Press remarked that, despite being the director's brother, Frank Stallone stood on his own with "mellow tunes" that "provided some of the nicest moments of the soundtrack", especially with the "bluesy" "Moody Girl". Lawson wrote that the Bee Gees' tracks were "likeable enough", commenting that "The Woman in You" was the strongest one, while "Breakout" showcased the "familiar elements of the group at its finest." However, he felt that the rest of their contributions lacked the "dynamics" of their Saturday Night Fever work.

On July 2, Cashbox reviewed the album and suggested that the "movie and its modern dance motifs could possibly bring on the same kind of enthusiasm generated by Flashdance", though they "may be somewhat hindered by the disco backlash." On July 15, the day of the film's premiere, Janet Maslin of The New York Times described the Bee Gees songs as "pleasant, but little more". A week later, Bruce Bailey of The Gazette found that Staying Alive was a soundtrack "in search of a movie", and noted that it was not "even particularly good". By the end of the month, Associated Press writer Bob Thomas wrote that the album was a "bore" and a "monumental disappointment" in comparison to Saturday Night Fever, from which came the sequel's "best" song: its title track. Thomas considered that "The Woman in You" was the best of the new Bee Gees tracks, since the rest had a "sense of deja vu" about them, and said that Stallone's compositions were "even worse", describing them as "anonymous and uninteresting." In August, David Denby wrote on New York magazine that even though the Bee Gees songs were "mediocre", they fared better when compared to the "Vegas-showroom junk" composed by Stallone.

In a retrospective review, AllMusic's William Ruhlmann found that despite the commercial failure of both the film and its soundtrack, the album contained some of the "better Bee Gees work of the '80s", especially its fourth track, "Someone Belonging to Someone".

== Track listing ==
All tracks on Side one are written and performed (as the Bee Gees) by Barry, Robin and Maurice Gibb, and are produced by the Bee Gees with Karl Richardson and Albhy Galuten. Performers on Side two are listed in parentheses.

Side one
No.	Title	Length
1.	"The Woman in You"	4:01
2.	"I Love You Too Much"	4:27
3.	"Breakout"	4:41
4.	"Someone Belonging to Someone"	4:24
5.	"Life Goes On"	4:23
6.	"Stayin' Alive" (edited version)	1:30

Side two
No.	Title	Writer(s)	Producer(s)	Length
1.	"Far from Over" (Frank Stallone)	Stallone; Vince DiCola	Johnny Mandel	3:53
2.	"Look Out for Number One" (Tommy Faragher)	Bruce Stephen Foster; Tom Marolda	Stewart Levine; Foster; Marolda	3:19
3.	"Finding Out the Hard Way" (Cynthia Rhodes)	Stallone; Roy Freeland	Levine; Stallone	3:30
4.	"Moody Girl" (Frank Stallone)	Stallone; DiCola; Joe "Bean" Esposito	Mandel	4:06
5.	"(We Dance) So Close to the Fire" (Tommy Faragher)	Randy Bishop; Faragher	Levine; Bishop	3:43
6.	"I'm Never Gonna Give You Up" (Frank Stallone and Cynthia Rhodes)	Stallone; DiCola; Esposito	Mandel	3:32
Total length:				45:29

== Personnel ==
Adapted from the album's liner notes.

Musicians

- Bee Gees – vocals (1–6)
- Frank Stallone – lead vocals (7, 10, 12)
- Tommy Faragher – lead vocals (8, 11)
- Cynthia Rhodes – lead vocals (9, 12)

Producers

- Bee Gees; Karl Richardson; Albhy Galuten (1–6)
- Johnny Mandel (7, 10, 12)
- Stewart Levine; Bruce Stephen Foster; Tom Marolda (8)
- Stewart Levine; Frank Stallone (9)
- Randy Bishop (11)
- Spencer Proffer – executive producer (11)

Production

- Frank Stallone; Vince DiCola – rhythm arrangements (7, 9)
- Joe "Bean" Esposito; Frank Stallone; Vince DiCola – rhythm arrangements (10, 12)
- Bernie Grundman – digital mastering
- Bill Levy – album art direction
- Mo Ström – album design (for Bob Heimall, Inc.)
- Mario Casilli – back cover photography

Engineers

- Karl Richardson; Steve Klein (1–5)
- Karl Richardson (6)
- Joel W. Moss (7, 10, 12)
- Rik Pekkonen (8, 9, 11)

== Charts ==
Weekly chart performance for Staying Alive
Chart (1983)	Peak position
Australian Albums (Kent Music Report)	28
Austrian Albums Chart	9
Dutch Albums Chart	17
German Albums Chart	8
Swedish Albums Chart	16
Swiss Albums Chart	1
UK Albums Chart	14
US Billboard 200	6

== Certifications and sales ==
Region	Certification	Certified units/sales
Canada (Music Canada)	Platinum	100,000^{^}
France (SNEP)	Gold	100,000^{*}
Hong Kong (IFPI Hong Kong)	Gold	10,000^{*}
United Kingdom (BPI)	Silver	60,000^{^}
United States (RIAA)	Platinum	1,000,000^{^}
Venezuela	—	113,000
^{*} Sales figures based on certification alone.^{^} Shipments figures based on certification alone.
