= Someone Belonging to Someone =

Single by Bee Gees

from the album Staying Alive
- B-side: "I Love You Too Much" (Instrumental)
- Released: July 1983 (US); August 1983 (UK)
- Recorded: November–December 1982
- Genre: Soft rock, blue-eyed soul
- Length: 4:24
- Label: RSO Records
- Songwriter: Barry, Robin & Maurice Gibb
- Producers: Bee Gees, Albhy Galuten, Karl Richardson

Bee Gees singles chronology
"The Woman in You" (1983)	"Someone Belonging to Someone" (1983)	"You Win Again" (1987)

"Someone Belonging to Someone" is the second and the last single from the soundtrack Staying Alive (1983), a quiet ballad performed by the Bee Gees.

== Background and release ==
The song was recorded November or December 1982 just after the recording sessions of Robin Gibb's How Old Are You? with Maurice participated playing several instruments. The song was recorded around the same time as "I Love You Too Much".

"Someone Belonging to Someone" and the instrumental version of "I Love You Too Much" would become the second single off the Staying Alive soundtrack. Robin and Maurice are not clearly present on either of these songs. The musicians are not credited on the sleeve, but the single credits David Sanborn for the saxophone solo. Years later, Albhy Galuten recalled only that they were some of the usual session players they liked to use.

In the liner notes to the 1990 box set, Tales from the Brothers Gibb, the Bee Gees describe the song as a "fair ballad from a silly film". The Bee Gees would not release a follow-up single until 1987 when "You Win Again" was released.

== Chart performance ==
Chart (1984)	Peak position
Belgium	23
Chinese Singles Chart	24
Germany Media Control Charts	55
Switzerland	24
UK Singles (OCC)	49
US Billboard Hot 100	49
