= Staying Alive (1983 film) =

1983 film by Sylvester Stallone

- Theatrical release poster
- Directed by: Sylvester Stallone
- Screenplay by: Sylvester Stallone; Norman Wexler
- Based on: Saturday Night Fever by Norman Wexler; Tribal Rites of the New Saturday Night by Nik Cohn
- Produced by: Robert Stigwood; Sylvester Stallone
- Starring: John Travolta; Cynthia Rhodes; Finola Hughes; Steve Inwood
- Cinematography: Nick McLean
- Edited by: Peter E. Berger; Mark Warner; Don Zimmerman
- Music by: Frank Stallone; Bee Gees
- Production company: RSO Records
- Distributed by: Paramount Pictures
- Release dates: July 11, 1983 (Mann's Chinese Theatre); July 15, 1983 (United States)
- Running time: 96 minutes
- Country: United States
- Language: English
- Budget: $22 million
- Box office: $126 million

Staying Alive is a 1983 American dance drama film and the sequel to Saturday Night Fever (1977). It was directed by Sylvester Stallone, produced by Stallone and the Saturday Night Fever producer Robert Stigwood, and written by Stallone and Norman Wexler. It stars John Travolta, reprising his Saturday Night Fever role as Tony Manero, with Cynthia Rhodes, Finola Hughes, Joyce Hyser, Julie Bovasso, Viktor Manoel and Kevyn Morrow.

The title comes from the Bee Gees song of the same name, which was used as the theme song to Saturday Night Fever and is played during the final scene of Staying Alive.

Theatrically released by Paramount Pictures on July 15, 1983, Staying Alive received negative reviews. It earned $126 million worldwide on a $22 million budget. It featured the song "Far from Over" by Stallone's brother Frank Stallone, which reached #10 on the Billboard Hot 100 and the Cashbox charts.

== Plot ==
Tony Manero, a former disco king, is living in a Manhattan flophouse, working as a dance instructor and waiter at a dance club, searching for a big break in the modern dance productions on Broadway. The break from his Brooklyn life seems to have somewhat matured Tony and refined his personality, including his diminished Brooklyn accent, an avoidance of alcohol, and less use of profanity. Other attitudes remain unchanged, such as his disregard for his girlfriend, the forgiving Jackie, who is a dancer and rock singer. Tony maintains some of his other macho double standards, such as seeing other women but being offended if he sees Jackie with other men.

Tony watches a show that features Jackie as a dancer in the chorus but focuses on the lead, English dancer Laura. He pursues her with seduction in mind and spends the night with her. He is annoyed when she dismisses him afterward, not understanding that she intended their encounter to be a one-night stand. Laura coldly justifies her treatment by saying that "Everybody uses everybody" and implies that Tony used her in order to get a dance role in her upcoming show. Unable to trust Tony, Jackie breaks up with him. Jackie, Tony and Laura then all audition for the Broadway production, Satan's Alley. Jackie and Tony land small roles, and Laura is cast as the lead female dancer.

Tony begins to realize how callous he has been to Jackie and walks from Manhattan to his old Bay Ridge neighborhood in Brooklyn in the middle of the night, which includes walking past 2001 Odyssey, his former hangout. When he visits his mother Flo and apologizes for the troublemaking ways of his youth, she points out that his selfish behavior as a teen helped him escape a dead-end life in Bay Ridge. Tony feels better and heads back to Manhattan to repair his relationship with Jackie. His hostility to and distance from the arrogant Laura increase as the production progresses.

Tony decides to take a shot at replacing Butler, the male lead of Satan's Alley, and requests Jackie to help him practice the number. Laura is disgusted when Tony succeeds and openly displays her resentment at having to partner him in the show. They cannot hide their chemistry on stage, though, which pleases the show's director Jesse.

Satan's Alley sells out, and the cast takes the stage to a standing-room-only crowd. The first act is a success despite Tony's disregard for the script when he kisses Laura at the end of their number. Jesse blasts Tony backstage, telling him to take his personal war away from the production. Laura seems to offer a truce when she asks to see him after the show to "clear things up". Aware of her manipulative ways, Tony coldly tells her that he has other commitments, and Laura snidely responds that he lacks star quality.

The second act is a dazzling display of dance and special effects, and Tony abandons the script near the end of the show. He hurls Laura away and gives way to his frustration in a solo dance. He then holds out his hand to Laura with a command to jump, and she leaps in his arms for a climactic finish to the show. Tony celebrates with his jubilant castmates and reconciles with Jackie. He leaves the theater and struts through Times Square.

== Cast ==
- John Travolta as Tony Manero
- Cynthia Rhodes as Jackie
- Finola Hughes as Laura
- Steve Inwood as Jesse
- Julie Bovasso as Flo Manero
- Charles Ward as Butler
- Norma Donaldson as Fatima
- Jesse Doran as Mark
- Joyce Hyser as Linda
- Frank Stallone as Carl
- Kurtwood Smith as Choreographer
- Richie Sambora as Music Club Band Guitarist (uncredited)
- Sylvester Stallone as Man on Street (uncredited)

Richie Sambora appeared in an uncredited role as a guitarist of the local band, in which Jackie and Carl also perform. Sylvester Stallone makes an uncredited cameo appearance as a man on the street whom Tony bumps into while making his rounds to visit talent agents.

Some of the cast from Saturday Night Fever were to reprise their roles but ended up removed from the final cut: Donna Pescow appeared as Annette in the audience at Tony's Broadway debut, and Val Bisoglio appeared briefly as Frank Manero Sr. His scene was deleted, and the film instead vaguely implies that he has probably died.

== Production ==
=== Development and writing ===
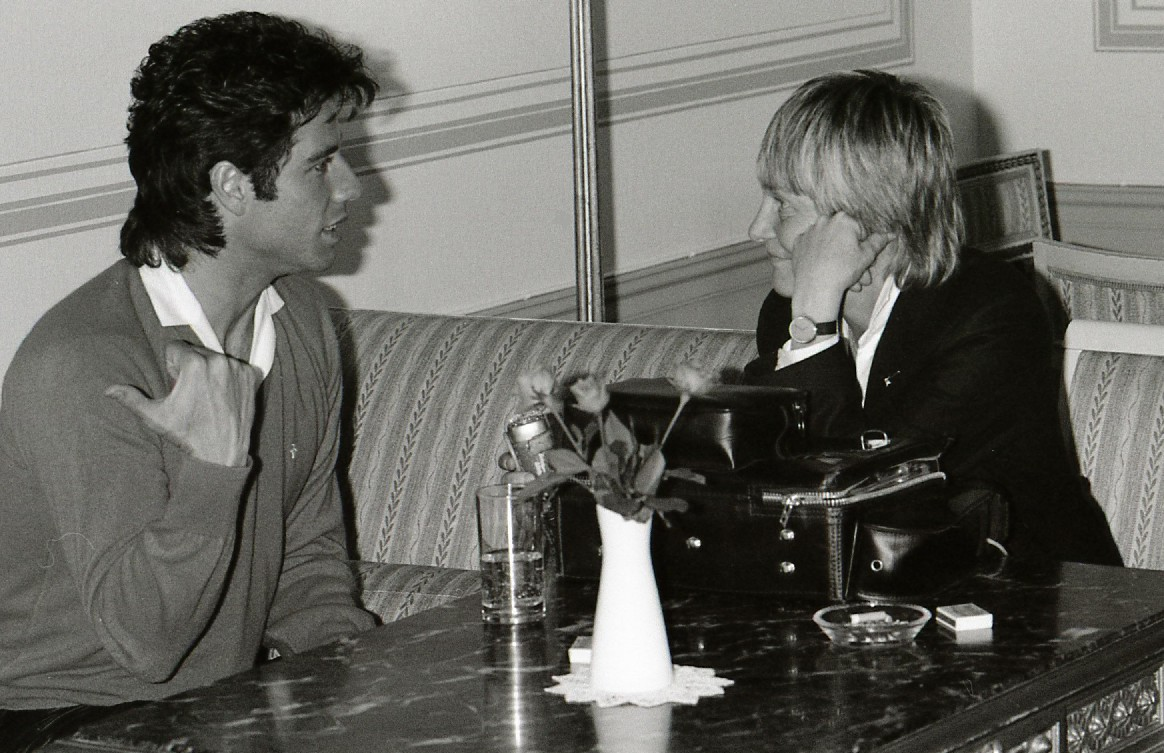
Kersti Adams-Ray interviews John Travolta in Sweden about Staying Alive, September 1983

Saturday Night Fever producer and writer Robert Stigwood and Norman Wexler started planning a sequel soon after the original film came out in 1977, due to the film's success. They came up with the title Staying Alive, and Wexler wrote a script. John Travolta was open to the idea of a sequel, but did not like the pessimism of the script, thinking that his character, Tony Manero, needed to see more success as a dancer. Stigwood and executives from Paramount Pictures spent the next several years trying to convince Travolta to film the script as written, but with no success. The project was considered abandoned, but then, in 1981, Stigwood met with Travolta to get Travolta's views on how a sequel should go. Travolta stated that he wanted Manero to attempt a dance career on Broadway and end up in a leading role due to his talent. Wexler wrote another script based on Travolta's ideas, in which Manero becomes a Broadway dancer but remains in the chorus. Travolta agreed to participate in the film, though he preferred an ending more like the one he had envisioned: he agreed that Wexler's ending was a more realistic outcome, but felt that it would not be sufficiently exciting for audiences.

It was then time to find a director for Staying Alive, and Travolta, who had just seen the film Rocky III (which Sylvester Stallone wrote, directed and starred in), told his agent that he wanted a director who could bring the energy and pacing of that film to Staying Alive. To Travolta's surprise, Paramount, with the help of then-studio chief Michael Eisner, was able to bring in Stallone himself. Travolta told Stallone about his idea for a happier ending, and Stallone rewrote the script to more closely match Travolta's vision. Stallone also made the Manero character more mature – given that the character was now six years older than in the original film – and made the film's language tamer than that of the first film, to ensure that it got a PG rating.

Under Stallone's supervision, Travolta spent five months doing rigorous training to develop a dancer's physique for the film, losing 20 pounds (9.1 kg) in the process.

== Music ==
Staying Alive: The Original Motion Picture Soundtrack, the film's soundtrack album, was released in June 1983, a month before the film's release. It featured five new songs by the Bee Gees and four co-written by Frank Stallone. Two of the album's singles, "Far from Over" and "The Woman in You", charted in the Billboard Hot 100 chart, at numbers 10 and 24, respectively. The soundtrack was nominated for Best Album of Original Score Written for a Motion Picture or a Television Special at the 26th Annual Grammy Awards in 1984.

== Reception ==
=== Box office ===
Staying Alive was a commercial success. The film opened with the biggest weekend for a musical film ever (at the time) with a gross of $12,146,143 from 1,660 screens. Overall, the film grossed nearly $65 million domestically against its $22 million budget. Worldwide it grossed $126 million. Though the domestic box office intake was less than the $94.2 million earned by Saturday Night Fever, the film nevertheless ranked in the top ten most financially successful films of 1983.

=== Critical response ===
Staying Alive was universally panned by film critics. On the review aggregator website Rotten Tomatoes, 3% of 31 critics' reviews are positive, with an average rating of 3.1/10. The website's consensus reads: "This sequel to Saturday Night Fever is shockingly embarrassing and unnecessary, trading the original's dramatic depth for a series of uninspired dance sequences." Metacritic, which uses a weighted average, assigned the film a score of 23 out of 100, based on 7 critics, indicating "generally unfavorable" reviews.

Roger Ebert of the Chicago Sun-Times, who had praised Saturday Night Fever, called the dance productions in Staying Alive "laughably gauche", especially the final number, which he mocked for including "fire, ice, smoke, flashing lights and laser beams". Ebert added that what the film most lacked was "the sense of reality in Saturday Night Fever... There's no old neighborhood, no vulgar showdowns with his family (he apologizes to his mother for his "attitude"!) and no Brooklyn eccentricity." In 2006, Entertainment Weekly dubbed Staying Alive the "Worst Sequel Ever." Many critics were unanimous in agreeing that the film did not contain the grittiness and realism that was possessed by Saturday Night Fever.

=== Accolades ===
The film is listed in Golden Raspberry Award founder John Wilson's book, The Official Razzie Movie Guide, as one of the 100 Most Enjoyably Bad Movies Ever Made.

Award	Category	Nominee(s)	Result	Ref.
Golden Globe Awards	Best Original Song	"Far from Over"; Music and Lyrics by Frank Stallone and Vince DiCola	Nominated	
Golden Raspberry Awards	Worst Actor	John Travolta	Nominated	
Golden Raspberry Awards	Worst Supporting Actress	Finola Hughes	Nominated	
Golden Raspberry Awards	Worst New Star	Finola Hughes	Nominated	
Grammy Awards	Best Album of Original Score Written for a Motion Picture or a Television Special	Staying Alive: Original Motion Picture Soundtrack; Vince DiCola, Joe "Bean" Esposito, Tommy Faragher, Bruce Stephen Foster, Roy Freeland, Barry Gibb, Maurice Gibb, Robin Gibb, Tom Marolda and Frank Stallone	Nominated	
Young Artist Awards	Best Family Motion Picture – Comedy or Musical		Nominated	
