= Runaway (1984 American film) =

1984 science fiction action film directed by Michael Crichton

- German release poster
- Directed by: Michael Crichton
- Written by: Michael Crichton
- Produced by: Michael I. Rachmil
- Starring: Tom Selleck; Cynthia Rhodes; Gene Simmons; Kirstie Alley; Stan Shaw
- Cinematography: John A. Alonzo
- Edited by: Glenn Farr; James Coblentz
- Music by: Jerry Goldsmith
- Production company: Delphi III Productions
- Distributed by: Tri-Star Pictures
- Release date: December 14, 1984
- Running time: 99 minutes
- Country: United States
- Language: English
- Budget: $8 million
- Box office: $6,770,587 (United States)

Runaway is a 1984 American science-fiction action film written and directed by Michael Crichton, and starring Tom Selleck, Gene Simmons (in his film debut), Cynthia Rhodes and Kirstie Alley. Selleck portrays a police officer assigned to track down dangerous robots, while Simmons is a scientist who hopes to profit from his manipulation of robots.

The film was released by TriStar Pictures on December 14, 1984. It was a box office disappointment and received mixed reviews.

== Plot ==
In 1991, robots are commonplace. When they malfunction and become dangerous, they are "runaways" handled by a division of the police trained in robotics.

Sgt. Jack R. Ramsay, a veteran officer, joined the "runaway" squad after an incident in which his fear of heights allowed a criminal to escape and kill a family. After years on the job, he and his new partner Karen Thompson find themselves handling the first robotic homicide. Investigating a household robot that murdered a family, Jack discovers strange integrated circuits that override a robot's safety features and direct it to attack humans. These circuits are created from master templates, enabling them to be mass-produced.

Ramsay cannot learn anything from uncooperative informants who end up dead but eventually discovers that the perpetrator is Dr. Charles Luther. Luther, while working for a defense contractor, developed a program that allows a robot to thermographically identify a human from amid cover and to differentiate between humans. Seeing the profit potential, he killed his fellow researchers and tried to sell the technology on the black market. A failed attempt to arrest Luther results in the recovery of another of his weapons, a smart bullet: a miniature heat seeking missile capable of locking onto a human target's unique heat signature.

While investigating, Ramsay and Thompson find Jackie Rogers, who was once Luther's lover. She double-crossed him and stole the circuit templates, intending to sell them. When they create a ruse to transfer Jackie to safety, Luther attacks the police convoy with robotic smart bombs. They discover that the bombs are zeroing in on a bug in Jackie's purse and throw the bag out the window before a bomb reaches the car.

Ramsay decides to make a public appearance with Jackie at a restaurant to draw Luther out, but instead Luther captures Thompson and wants Ramsay to exchange her for Jackie and the templates. Before making the exchange, Jackie gives some templates to Ramsay for insurance that Luther will not kill her. He kills her anyway after discovering the templates missing.

To retrieve the missing templates, Luther plans to attack Ramsay. He uses the police computers to discover everything about Ramsay's personal life, including his son Bobby. After discovering that his information was hacked, Ramsay races home to find Bobby missing. Luther calls to confirm that he kidnapped Bobby and wants to exchange him for the missing templates.

Ramsay agrees to meet Luther at an unfinished skyscraper. Luther gets the templates while Ramsay sends Bobby down in an elevator. "Assassin" robots—small, spider-like robots that kill by injecting their victims with acid—are waiting to kill the first person exiting the elevator. Thompson arrives and helps Bobby stay out of reach of the robots. Furious, Luther begins firing smart bullets, but Ramsay turns on the robotic construction equipment, creating heat sources that cause the bullets to miss. Ramsay attempts an escape downward on the elevator, but the elevator malfunctions, speeding up to and stopping on the very top. Ramsay is forced to overcome his acrophobia by locating a reset switch underneath to restart the elevator back down, whilst encountering and defeating 3 robot spiders. He succeeds, but encounters Luther again. During a confrontation, Ramsay and Luther fight, but Ramsay gains the upper hand by stopping the elevator. The abrupt stop catapults Luther onto the ground, in the midst of his robot spiders. Programmed to kill whoever came down, the robots rush Luther, repeatedly injecting him.

After helping Bobby down, Ramsay approaches Luther. Screaming, Luther reaches up to grab Ramsay, but falls back, dead, while the spiders self-destruct. Ramsay and Thompson kiss.

== Cast ==
- Tom Selleck as Sergeant Jack R. Ramsay
- Cynthia Rhodes as Officer Karen Thompson
- Gene Simmons as Dr. Charles Luther
- Kirstie Alley as Jackie Rogers
- Stan Shaw as Sergeant Marvin James
- G. W. Bailey as Chief of Police
- Joey Cramer as Bobby Ramsay
- Chris Mulkey as David Johnson
- Sullivan Walker as K.C.
- Anne-Marie Martin as Hooker At Bar
- Michael Paul Chan as Wilson
- Babz Chula as Construction Foreperson
- Marilyn Schreffler as Lois (voice)
- Elizabeth Norment as Miss Shields
- Carol Teesdale as Sally
- Paul Batten as Harry
- Betty Phillips as Linda
- Stephen Thorne as Tommy
- Stephen E. Miller as Rudy
- Cec Verrell as Hooker
- Amber Borycki as Baby (uncredited)

== Production ==
=== Writing ===
The film was written and directed by Michael Crichton who said he deliberately made it vague how far into the future the film was set. "If you want my world view, I think it's about a year ahead," he said.

Crichton said the film "is not a cautionary tale" about technology but "an updated police story with every police cliche turned a bit. This is a movie, at least in part, about the difference between people and machines. We tried very hard to keep perspective. Machines are so visually interesting that a lot of times they threaten to take over a film."

Crichton wanted to ensure the film was visual and easy to follow. "Movies are about the here and now in things you see. To me, there's no point in writing a highly cinematic book or doing a very literary movie."

=== Casting ===
The star was Tom Selleck who had had a small role in Crichton's film Coma and since became a star on TV in Magnum, P.I.. Selleck later said, "With my TV series, I don't have the luxury of taking on a lot of projects. So when I got offered a movie and the timing's right, I say yes. I keep thinking if I don't say yes, then everyone will go away. And being a fan of Michael Crichton's helped, because I'm really very nervous doing this. I need my confidence built as much as anybody. It's a strange business. I like to grow in my parts, this was a risk in some ways."

The film marked the first feature acting role for rock star Gene Simmons (he had been in Kiss Meets the Phantom of the Park). Simmons had been interested in acting for a while, and had studied it since 1981. He turned down a TV series which wanted to exploit his KISS fame as well as parts in Flashdance and Doctor Detroit because he "wasn't interested in musicals or comedy. I wanted to start out in something serious. I understand brooding characters more than I do splashy people." He was offered the part after meeting Crichton and did not have to read for it.

"I didn't see Luther as evil", Simmons said, "but as a deadly animal who kills when someone gets in his way. Crichton didn't want me to memorize the script or talk to my acting coach. His direction was, 'Don't be afraid to try different things.' "

=== Filming ===
Filming took place from 29 May to August 1984, while Selleck was on a break from Magnum, P.I.. The entire film was shot in Vancouver, British Columbia, with the exception of the cornfield sequence, which was filmed in Moses Lake, Washington.

Mercury Topazes were used for the police cruisers in the film.

=== Music ===
Jerry Goldsmith composed the original musical score, which was the composer's first all-electronic soundtrack.

== Release ==
With a multi-million dollar budget, big-name actors and a world-famous author as both writer and director, Runaway was planned as 1984's major science fiction draw. However, it was overshadowed by James Cameron's blockbuster The Terminator, Star Trek III: The Search for Spock, and 2010: The Year We Make Contact, and the film was a box office disappointment.

== Reception ==
The film received mixed reviews. Janet Maslin of The New York Times said, "Mr. Crichton has a much better feel for the gadgets than its human players." Kevin Thomas of the Los Angeles Times called it "assured, thoroughly cinematic filmmaking, its flourish of ingenious gadgetry not overwhelming its human dimension." Gene Siskel of the Chicago Tribune thought the movie began "excitingly" but "descended into a routine chase thriller" in which Selleck was a poor lead ("he's too nice, too familiar to be a big star in the movies"). At the Movies gave Runaway two thumbs down. Roger Ebert thought that Selleck and Simmons gave "good performances" but the film quickly became mired in cliches, while Gene Siskel thought the core premise was intriguing but the film was poorly executed.

John Nubbin reviewed Runaway for Different Worlds magazine and stated that "As long as we keep getting films like Runaway, there will still be hope for the science-fiction and fantasy genres as a whole in film, and not just their pretenders." Neil Gaiman reviewed Runaway for Imagine magazine, and stated that "The race to outwit the cybernetic psycho is gripping stuff, mostly, with a terrifying showdown atop an unfinished skyscraper; and as the hero cop with no head for heights, Selleck is fine. In between, he spends too much time just being a heart-throb."

On Rotten Tomatoes, it has a rating of 46% based on reviews from 24 critics.

Kirstie Alley earned a 1984 Saturn Award nomination for Best Supporting Actress for her performance.

== See also ==
- List of American films of 1984
- The Phantom Creeps
