= Curse of the Crystal Eye =

- Directed by: Joe Tornatore
- Written by: Mikel Angel; Joe Tornatore
- Produced by: Robert Patterson; Maurice Smith
- Starring: Jameson Parker; Cynthia Rhodes
- Distributed by: New Horizons
- Release date: 1991
- Running time: 73 minutes
- Country: United States
- Language: English

Curse of the Crystal Eye is a 1991 adventure film directed by Joe Tornatore that was filmed in Mauritius. It was distributed by New Horizons.

== Plot ==
A man goes through a quest through Asia and Africa to find the fabled treasure of Ali Baba.

== Cast ==
- Jameson Parker
- Cynthia Rhodes
- Mike Lane
- David Sherwood

== Reception ==
One review called it "a second rate Romancing the Stone but quite entertaining for all that."

Psychotronic Video said "The light adventure features lots of extras and horses and since it's a Corman production those scenes are mostly likely from another movie. Also with a ridiculous and useless floating carpet, unconvincing quicksand and Parker in blackface."
