= Living Eyes (Bee Gees album) =

Studio album by the Bee Gees
- Released: October 1981
- Recorded: February – June 1981
- Studios: Criteria Studios (Miami, Florida); Middle Ear Studio (Miami Beach, Florida) (string arrangements); Mediasound (New York City, New York) (horn arrangements)
- Genres: Soft rock, art rock
- Length: 46:04
- Labels: RSO; Polydor Japan
- Producers: Bee Gees; Albhy Galuten; Karl Richardson

Bee Gees chronology
Greatest (1979)	Living Eyes (1981)	Staying Alive: The Original Motion Picture Soundtrack (1983)

Singles from Living Eyes
- 1. "He's a Liar" Released: 19 September 1981; 2. "Living Eyes" Released: November 1981

Living Eyes is the sixteenth studio album (fourteenth internationally) by the Bee Gees, released in 1981. It was the band's final album on RSO Records, which would be absorbed into Polydor and subsequently discontinued. The album showcased a soft rock sound that contrasted with their disco and R&B material of the mid-to-late 1970s; having become a prominent target of the popular backlash against disco, the Bee Gees were pressured to publicly disassociate from the genre.

While Living Eyes did not sell well in either the UK or the US, it was a top 40 hit in the majority of territories in which it saw wide release. The album earned mixed to negative reviews from critics, and the Gibb brothers themselves have expressed their dislike of it, considering it a rush job influenced by commercial considerations.

== Overview ==
Following the massive success of Barry's production on Barbra Streisand's album Guilty, the Bee Gees regrouped at Middle Ear studios in October 1980 to record their next album. They began work on some of the songs that would go onto Living Eyes. As they had been on all their recordings since 1975, they were backed by Blue Weaver (keyboards, synthesisers, programming), Alan Kendall (lead guitar), and Dennis Bryon (drums, percussion), but the sessions broke down and the three backing musicians were fired. Alan Kendall would return to working with the Bee Gees in 1989, and he remained with them for the rest of their recording and touring career.

== Recording ==
Recording began early in 1981 without the Bee Gees band that recorded and toured with the group in the late 1970s. Barry felt that he could create the sound he wanted with session musicians instead of a band, and the album featured musicians including Don Felder, Jeff Porcaro, Richard Tee, George Terry and Steve Gadd. Also, the Bee Gees stated that they were trying to avoid being pigeonholed as a disco act, which was why the album also featured minimal falsetto vocals (which had become a Bee Gees trademark by that time), with one notable exception being the song "Soldiers".

Barry, along with producers Albhy Galuten and Karl Richardson had developed their own production style, with Spirits Having Flown and Barbra Streisand's #1 album Guilty. But Robin and Maurice had become active in the studio again, contributing more to vocals and production, which created some tension between them and the Gibb-Galuten-Richardson production team. Galuten later commented on why Living Eyes failed to impact both US and UK charts:

"There was a tremendous fear, that we had fallen into a rut, and I felt strongly on Living Eyes that it was time to change. When we started working on [it] and it was not being fun, I remember sitting around with my friends at the time, and saying, 'It's just not working and I think that I'm going to leave.'"

Living Eyes also features the return of Robin and Maurice Gibb as a lead vocalist since 1975 in a whole song. As Barry says that his falsetto was the reason why Robin (or Maurice) had not taken lead vocals (in a whole track) on any song by the group between 1976 and 1979: "'God, every falsetto record we're putting out is a monster, we shouldn't change yet.' That's what stopped us from saying, 'Well it's time Robin had a lead.' But now it's no longer a sales point, it's important that Robin's voice get heard. It's equally important that Maurice's voice gets heard. And it's becoming less important that I get heard. And that's the way we work. There's no ego within the three of us, whoever's singing most or whoever has the most hits is irrelevant."

== Commercial reception ==
"Living Eyes was a turkey, I think, for a good reason, I don't think that last album does any harm but I'm really glad it was a turkey."

— Robin Gibb, on the album's failure unlike the group's previous releases.

Sales of Living Eyes were far lower than those of their previous album, Spirits Having Flown. In the US, the disco backlash was still strong, and many radio stations outright refused to play the record because the Bee Gees name was on it. Also, RSO Records was in no position to support the group; the label's massive investment in disco had wiped them out so thoroughly that by mid-1981, they had no functioning promotional division or marketing team. There was also an ongoing Bee Gees lawsuit against Robert Stigwood and the label, which did not help matters.

The Bee Gees themselves subsequently dismissed this album as weak, claiming that it had been recorded under pressure from their record company and management at a time when they needed to rethink their direction. Despite this, Barry commented about Living Eyes following its release, "It's our finest album in terms of depth, performance and quality of the production. It's been about 11 months working on this album, and we do tend to work an awful long time on our albums because we want to be sure." But in 1984, Barry admitted: "Obviously, we had a scare with Living Eyes. It wasn't the kind of album we should have brought out at that point. It was a little too downbeat, as opposed to having energy. But we were trying to go for a change, to draw ourselves away from the falsetto vocals and do something that might be a little different. We knew the risks when we did that."

Barry claimed, in 1990, "Living Eyes was just what was needed for us. We needed to stop being what we were. It was driving us all round the twist. We needed at that point to step back and look at our lives as individuals."

=== Compact Disc release ===
A promotional photo of the Bee Gees showing off the Living Eyes demonstration CD, with an LP copy alongside for comparison.

Living Eyes was chosen to be the first ever album to be manufactured on CD for demonstration purposes, as seen on the BBC TV program Tomorrow's World in 1981, and was featured on the inaugural issue of the Compact Disc trade magazine. It was the first Bee Gees album to be released on CD, in early 1983 when compact discs were first commercially available, though few were manufactured.

== Critical reception ==
Professional ratings
Review scores
Source	Rating
AllMusic	3/5 stars
The Encyclopedia of Popular Music	2/5 stars
The Great Rock Discography	4/10
The Philadelphia Inquirer	3/5 stars
(The New) Rolling Stone Album Guide	2.5/5 stars

Within a 3/5 stars review, Philadelphia Inquirer noted, "Gone is the disco beat and most of the falsetto vocals, but the Bee Gees continue to demonstrate a sharp ear for mainstream pop... This time around, they are not setting any trends, but included are several very pleasant songs - ballads and mid tempo numbers."

Joe Viglione of Allmusic, in a 3/5 stars review, wrote "In terms of hit singles and precise musical vision, it would have been difficult for anyone to have to follow-up the brilliant Spirits Having Flown album, but these industry veterans created a real gem in Living Eyes which seems to have gotten lost in the maze that is their deep catalog."

== Track listing ==
All songs written by Barry, Robin and Maurice Gibb except where noted.

No.	Title	Writer(s)	Lead vocals	Length
1.	"Living Eyes"		Barry	4:16
2.	"He's a Liar"		Barry	4:00
3.	"Paradise"		Barry and Robin	4:18
4.	"Don't Fall in Love with Me"		Robin	4:55
5.	"Soldiers"		Barry	4:25
6.	"I Still Love You"		Robin and Maurice	4:24
7.	"Wildflower"		Maurice	4:23
8.	"Nothing Could Be Good"	Barry Gibb, Robin Gibb, Maurice Gibb, Albhy Galuten	Barry	4:09
9.	"Cryin' Every Day"		Robin and Barry	4:01
10.	"Be Who You Are"	Barry Gibb	Barry	6:38

== Outtakes ==
1. "Heart (Stop Beating in Time)" (later recorded by Leo Sayer and released as a single in 1982, followed by Marilyn McCoo and her single release in 1983)
2. "Hold Her in Your Hand" (Barry Gibb, Maurice Gibb) (later recorded by Maurice Gibb in 1984 for the soundtrack to A Breed Apart)
3. "Heat of the Night" – 4:02
4. "Loving You Is Killing Me"
5. "Mind over Matter" – 4:30
6. "The Promise You Made" – 3:14

== Personnel ==
Credits from Joseph Brennan.

Bee Gees

- Barry Gibb – vocals, acoustic guitar (1, 3–7), guitars (1), string and horn arrangements
- Robin Gibb – vocals
- Maurice Gibb – vocals, acoustic guitar (1, 3–7), string and horn arrangements

Guest and additional musicians

- George Bitzer – acoustic piano (1, 3), synthesizers (2), Rhodes electric piano (7, 8)
- Richard Tee – Rhodes electric piano (1, 3), acoustic piano (2, 4–6, 8)
- Albhy Galuten – synthesizers (1–3, 5, 6, 9, 10), bass (9), string and horn arrangements, conductor
- Sidney Dutiel – synthesizers (9), bass (9)
- David Wolinski – Rhodes electric piano (10)
- George Terry – guitars (1, 10)
- Chuck Kirkpatrick – slide guitar (1), sitar (6), guitars (8)
- Don Felder – guitars (2–5, 7, 10)
- Harold Cowart – bass guitar (1–5, 7, 8)
- Bob Glaub – bass guitar (10)
- Jeff Porcaro – drums (1, 5, 9)
- Steve Gadd – drums (2–6, 8)
- Russ Kunkel – drums (7, 9, 10)
- Solly Noid – drums (9)
- Joe Galdo – snare drum (10)
- Ralph MacDonald – percussion (1, 2, 4, 5)
- Roger Troutman – percussion (5)
- Gene Orloff – contractor, conductor (10)

The Boneroo Horns on "He's a Liar"

- Don Bonsanti
- Neil Bonsanti
- Whit Sidener
- Peter Graves (leader)
- Ken Faulk
- Brett Murphey

Brass Sextet (Tracks 4 & 10)

- Peter Graves
- Ken Faulk
- Greg Lonnman
- Brett Murphey
- Jerry Peel
- Ken Waldenpfhul

=== Production ===
- Bee Gees – producers
- Albhy Galuten – producer
- Karl Richardson – producer, engineer
- Don Gehman – engineer
- Don Brewer – assistant engineer
- Alex Clark – assistant engineer
- Lincoln Clapp – assistant engineer
- Dennis Hetzendorfer – assistant engineer
- Nick Kalliongis – assistant engineer
- Jim Pace – assistant engineer
- Dale Peterson – assistant engineer
- Al Stegmeyer – assistant engineer
- Sam Taylor – assistant engineer
- Mike Fuller – mastering
- Dick Ashby – project coordinator
- Tom Kennedy – project coordinator
- Neal Kent – project coordinator
- Glenn Ross – design
- TDK/One World Productions – design concept
- Bob Sherman – photography
- Minsei Tominaga – photography

== Charts ==
Chart (1981)	Position
Australia (Kent Music Report)	30
Canadian Albums (RPM)	32
Dutch Albums (Dutch Charts)	7
Japanese LPs (Oricon)	26
New Zealand Albums (RIANZ)	13
Norwegian Albums (VG-lista)	6
Spanish Albums (Promusicae)	4
Swedish Albums (Sverigetopplistan)	18
UK Albums	73
US Billboard 200	41
West German Albums (Media Control)	37

== Certifications and sales ==
Region	Certification	Certified units/sales
Canada (Music Canada)	Platinum	100,000^{^}
Hong Kong (IFPI Hong Kong)	Gold	10,000^{*}
Italy	—	100,000
Spain (Promusicae)	Gold	50,000^{^}
Yugoslavia	—	24,279
^{*} Sales figures based on certification alone.^{^} Shipments figures based on certification alone.
