= He's a Liar =

Single by Bee Gees

from the album Living Eyes
- B-side: "He's a Liar" (Instrumental)
- Released: 19 September 1981
- Recorded: February – June 1981
- Genre: Rock; new wave
- Length: 4:00; 4:36 (extended intro)
- Label: RSO
- Songwriter: Barry, Robin & Maurice Gibb
- Producers: Bee Gees; Albhy Galuten; Karl Richardson

Bee Gees singles chronology
"Spirits (Having Flown)" (1979)	"He's a Liar" (1981)	"Living Eyes" (1981)

"He's a Liar" is a song by the Bee Gees, released on 19 September 1981 as the first single from their album Living Eyes. The song was written by brothers Barry, Robin and Maurice Gibb.

== Background ==
Unlike the last three Bee Gees albums – which included primarily their established, longstanding studio and touring band – "He's a Liar" features an array of studio musicians: Don Felder of Eagles on lead guitars, Harold Cowart on bass, Steve Gadd on drums, and Richard Tee on piano. A version with a slightly longer intro was released as a 12-inch single in Germany and later on the Japan-only compilation Rare Collection. It was recorded between the months of February and June 1981. This song is rumoured to have been inspired by the feud the Bee Gees were having with their manager (and owner of their record label), Robert Stigwood, at the time. The brothers would later reconcile with Stigwood and remain good friends.

== Release and aftermath ==
Even though this song sounded nothing like the Bee Gees' disco-era singles, the backlash had pigeonholed the Bee Gees as a disco act and radio stations were reluctant to play any new Bee Gees music. After six consecutive number-one singles in the US, "He's a Liar" peaked at number 30, which was far from the heights of their success in the late '70s. The song did better in Belgium and the Netherlands.

In Italy, the single sold 60,000 copies in two weeks. The song's only appearance on a compilation was 1990's Tales from the Brothers Gibb.

Record World said that it has "a loping rhythm, recurring synthesizer bass figure" and "the Bee Gees' trademark harmonies."

== Music video ==
A video was made for the song which featured the three Gibb brothers and Sixteen Candles actress Haviland Morris. Robin portrays a man who is a lover of a woman, played by Haviland. However, Maurice spots the pair kissing, and he shoots them. After fleeing from the house, Maurice evades the police on foot, nearly getting caught. Eventually, he is cornered and thrown into a police car but manages to escape. In the last shot, a car drives down a darkened street and Maurice follows on foot, still being pursued by police. An ambulance with Robin and Haviland inside follows as the video and song fades out. The brothers also mime to the song in several shots.

== Chart performance ==
Chart performance for "He's a Liar"
Chart (1981)	Peak position
Australia (Kent Music Report)	38
Belgium (Ultratop 50 Flanders)	15
Canada Top Singles (RPM)	33
Germany (GfK)	68
Netherlands (Dutch Top 40)	12
Netherlands (Single Top 100)	17
UK Singles (Official Charts Company)	82
US Billboard Hot 100	30
US Cash Box	40
US Record World	43
