= Far from Over (song) =

1983 single by Frank Stallone

Single by Frank Stallone

from the album Staying Alive: The Original Motion Picture Soundtrack/Frank Stallone
- B-side: "Far from Over" (instrumental or à capella)
- Released: July 12, 1983
- Genre: Dance-rock
- Length: 3:13 (single version); 3:55 (soundtrack version)
- Label: RSO, Polydor
- Songwriters: Frank Stallone, Vince DiCola
- Producer: Johnny Mandel

Frank Stallone singles chronology
"Case of You" (1980)	"Far from Over" (1983)	"Darlin'" (1984)

"Far from Over" is a song by Frank Stallone that appeared in the 1983 film Staying Alive and was also featured in the film's soundtrack. The song was written by Stallone and Vince DiCola. The song was nominated for a Golden Globe Award for Best Original Song. The song was remixed by Jellybean Benitez.

It was a top-10 U.S. single in September 1983, peaking at number 10 on the Billboard Hot 100, becoming his only major hit single. The 7" single version is slightly different from the LP version, and it was the 7" version which was played on most radio stations in the US while on the Billboard Hot 100. In the U.S., the song became RSO Records' final top 10 single and top 40 hit on the Billboard Hot 100.

== Appearances in other media ==
- The instrumental version was used as the theme for Jim Crockett Promotions wrestling show Starrcade from 1983 to 1987.
- The instrumental version was used for two unsold game show pilots produced by Jay Wolpert which are Fortune Hunters as a cue for commercial breaks and closing theme hosted by Bob Hanley in 1983 and as a theme song for Fast Friends hosted by Bob Goen in 1984.
- The song was used as an opening theme for NASCAR races on TBS from 1983 to 1985.
- The song was also performed live in 1983 on Val Doonican's Christmas by the Irish group The Nolans.
- In 1984, the song made a memorable appearance in the famous Saturday Night Live "synchronized swimming" segment with Martin Short and Harry Shearer.
- The song's instrumental bridge was the original opening theme song of The Jerry Lawler Show, which debuted in 1983 on WMC-TV in Memphis, Tennessee.
- The 1987 Alpha Denshi arcade game Kyros, uses the song when the player is powered up.
- WRAL-TV in Raleigh, North Carolina (which was the taping home for Jim Crockett's Mid-Atlantic Championship Wrestling at one time and was the broadcaster for Crockett wrestling) used it for their Action Sports Saturday broadcasts during the mid-1980s.
- The song was used by WDIV-TV in Detroit for its Sunday sports wrap-up show Sports Final Edition.
- The song had renewed popularity in 2010 when Australian comedy duo Hamish & Andy proclaimed on air that the song gave the listener an extra burst of energy and dubbed the phenomenon as "The Frank Effect". A special one-time concert was held in Australia as a result, which was documented in their 2010 TV special Hamish & Andy's Reministmas Special.
- In a 2016 episode of The Jim Gaffigan Show, Adam Goldberg as Dave Marks, is seen to find his creative fire in a montage as the song plays.
- In Season 2 Episode 6 of the Netflix series GLOW, the song is used during a training montage.
- In Season 1 Episode 10 of the TV series Doom Patrol, when Beard Hunter is preparing for his mission.
- In Episode 1 of American Horror Story: 1984, when the crew is dancercizing.
- In season 1, episode 5 of Hamish & Andy's Gap Year, during a montage of Hamish Blake's Mr. New York State Bodybuilding Competition performance.
- In 2007, the song was featured in French electronic duo Justice's famously rejected Fabric mix, released independently as the "Justice Xmas Mix".

== Charts ==
=== Weekly charts ===
Chart (1983)	Peak position
Canada Top Singles (RPM)	15
Canada Adult Contemporary (RPM)	2
Germany (GfK)	11
Italy (FIMI)	22
UK Singles (Official Charts)	68
US Billboard Hot 100	10
U.S. Billboard Disco/Dance Top 80	43
US Cash Box	10

Chart (1984)	Peak position
Australia (Kent Music Report)	61
Belgium (Ultratop 50 Flanders)	3
Belgium (VRT Top 30 Flanders)	2
France (IFOP)	16
Netherlands (Single Top 100)	4
Netherlands (Dutch Top 40)	6
Switzerland (Schweizer Hitparade)	5

=== Year-end charts ===
Chart (1983)	Rank
Italy (FIMI)	98
US Billboard Hot 100	93
US Cash Box Top 100	78

Chart (1984)	Rank
Belgium (Ultratop 50 Flanders)	82
Netherlands (Single Top 100)	84
Netherlands (Dutch Top 40)	79

== Covers ==
- In 2015, the song was covered by the television series Glee in the episode "The Rise and Fall of Sue Sylvester". It was then released on an EP for the episode.
