= Frank Stallone =

American actor and musician

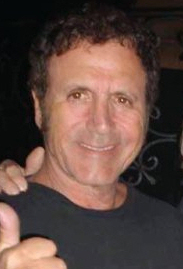
- Stallone in 2012
- Born: Francesco Stallone Jr. July 30, 1950 (age 76); Maryland, U.S.
- Occupations: Actor; musician
- Years active: 1976–present
- Parent(s): Frank Stallone Sr. Jackie Stallone
- Relatives: Sylvester Stallone (brother); Sage Stallone (nephew); Sistine Stallone (niece)

Francesco Stallone Jr. (born July 30, 1950) is an American actor and musician. He is the younger brother of actor and filmmaker Sylvester Stallone and has written music for Sylvester's movies. His song "Far from Over" appeared in the 1983 film Staying Alive and was included in the film's soundtrack album. The song reached number ten on the US Billboard Hot 100 and received a Golden Globe nomination for Stallone, while the album itself, consisting of Stallone and various other artists, received a Grammy nomination.

== Early life ==
Stallone was born in Maryland and grew up in Philadelphia. He is the younger son of Jackie Stallone (née Labofish; 1921–2020), an astrologer, former dancer, and promoter of women's professional wrestling, and Frank Stallone Sr. (1919–2011). His father was an Italian immigrant, and his mother's family was French from Brittany. In his teen years, he went to Lincoln High School in Northeast Philadelphia.

== Career ==
=== 1980s to 1990s ===
Stallone has worked as a singer. He wrote and performed "Far from Over" for the 1983 film Staying Alive, which was written and directed by his older brother. The song peaked at No. 10 on the Billboard Hot 100, becoming his only major pop hit, and it was nominated for a Golden Globe award for Best Original Song from a Motion Picture. The album was nominated for a Grammy Award for Best Album of Original Score Written for a Motion Picture or Television Special. Stallone also had a minor acting role in "Staying Alive".

Stallone also played himself in a recurring role on the short-lived sitcom Movie Stars, alongside fellow celebrity siblings Don Swayze and Joey Travolta.

Stallone was the subject of repeated non-sequitur punchlines delivered by comedian Norm Macdonald during the Weekend Update segment of the television show Saturday Night Live. On Instagram, Stallone said he enjoyed the jokes and expressed regret that they were never able to work together before Macdonald's death from leukemia.

=== 2000s and 2010s ===
Stallone appeared as a boxing consultant on the NBC reality television series The Contender in 2005. He appeared on the Howard Stern radio show on several occasions. During one 1992 appearance on The Howard Stern Show, Stallone had a boxing match with television reporter Geraldo Rivera; Stallone won the bout. He was a contestant on Hulk Hogan's Celebrity Championship Wrestling, a reality competition series on CMT that followed ten celebrity contestants as they trained to be professional wrestlers. He also appeared on an episode of Tim and Eric Awesome Show, Great Job!.

On August 17, 2010, the Australian comedy duo Hamish & Andy flew Stallone, then aged 60, to Australia for a one-night-only gig called "Hamish & Andy present: Frank Stallone “Let me be Frank with you” The Fully Franked Tour'". Following a parade in Melbourne, Stallone performed "Far from Over" to an audience of over 2,000 people. Hamish & Andy were big fans of the song, claiming it always pumped them up, and they dubbed the phenomenon "The Frank Effect". Stallone said of the night, "This is seriously one of the best, best times I've ever had."

A documentary directed and produced by Derek Wayne Johnson entitled Stallone: Frank, That Is about the life, career, and survival of Frank Stallone was released in 2021. The documentary features interviews with Sylvester Stallone, Arnold Schwarzenegger, Billy Zane, Geraldo Rivera, Joe Mantegna and many others.

== Discography ==
=== Studio albums ===
- Frank Stallone (1984)
- Day in Day Out with The Billy May Orchestra (1991)
- Close Your Eyes with The Sammy Nestico Big Band (1993)
- Soft and Low (1999)
- Full Circle (2000)
- Frankie and Billy (2002)
- Songs from the Saddle (2005)
- Heart and Souls (2007)

=== Compilation albums ===
- Stallone on Stallone – By Request (2002) (re-recorded versions)
- In Love in Vain with The Sammy Nestico Orchestra (2003)

=== Singles ===
Title	Release	Peak chart positions		Album
Title	Release	US	AUS	Album
"Case of You"	1980	67	—	Heart and Souls
"Far from Over"	1983	10	61	Frank Stallone / Staying Alive soundtrack
"Moody Girl"	1983	—	—	Staying Alive soundtrack
"I'm Never Gonna Give You Up" with Cynthia Rhodes	1983	—	—	Staying Alive soundtrack
"Darlin'"	1984	81	—	Frank Stallone
"If We Ever Get Back"	1985	—	—	Frank Stallone

=== Soundtrack appearances ===
- "Take You Back" (from Rocky) (1976)
- "Angel Voice / Please Be Someone To Me" (from Paradise Alley) (1978)
- "Na Na Ninni / Two Kinds of Love" (from Rocky II) (1979)
- "Pushin'" and "Take You Back" (from Rocky III) (1982)
- "Far from Over", "Moody Girl", "I'm Never Gonna Give You Up" with Cynthia Rhodes, I Hope We Never Change, Finding Out the Hard Way, Waking Up (from Staying Alive) (1983)
- "Peace in Our Life" (from Rambo: First Blood Part II) (1985)
- "Bad Nite" (from Over the Top) (1987)
- "You Don't Want to Fight with Me" (from The Expendables 2) (2012)

== Selected filmography ==
- Rocky (1976)
- Paradise Alley (1978)
- Rocky II (1979)
- Rocky III (1982)
- Hotline (1982)
- Staying Alive (1983)
- The Pink Chiquitas (1987)
- Barfly (1987)
- Fear (1988)
- Heart of Midnight (1988)
- Ten Little Indians (1989)
- Masque of the Red Death (1989)
- Hudson Hawk (1991)
- The Roller Blade Seven (1991)
- The Legend of the Rollerblade Seven (1992)
- Return of the Roller Blade Seven (1993)
- Tombstone (1993)
- Public Enemies (1996)
- Doublecross on Costa's Island (1997)
- The Good Life (1997)
- Ground Rules (1997)
- Angels with Angles (2005)
- Rocky Balboa (2006)
- Fred Claus (2007)
- Corrado (2009)
- Reach Me (2014)
- Transformers: Robots in Disguise (2015, voice)
