= Living Eyes (song) =

Single by Bee Gees

from the album Living Eyes
- B-side: "I Still Love You"
- Released: November 1981
- Recorded: February – June 1981
- Genre: Soft rock
- Length: 4:16
- Label: RSO
- Songwriter: Barry, Robin & Maurice Gibb
- Producers: Bee Gees, Albhy Galuten, Karl Richardson

Bee Gees singles chronology
| "He's a Liar" (1981) | "Living Eyes" (1981) | "The Woman in You" (1983) |

"Living Eyes" is a power ballad recorded by the Bee Gees and was released in November 1981 as the second single and title track off the LP of the same name. It was written by Barry, Robin & Maurice Gibb. The sound of this single was closer musically to the rest of the album than its predecessor, "He's a Liar".

== Release ==
The song starts in A minor with synthesizer played by Albhy Galuten blended with Barry's voice (mimicking the synthesizer line). On the verses, Barry sings low and high harmony.

"Living Eyes" was a top ten hit in Austria. It peaked at No. 45 on the US Billboard Hot 100 in late 1981, which marked the end of the Gibbs' Top 40 singles streak which began in 1975 with "Jive Talkin'".

Record World called it " a simple, poignant ballad that finds its strength in the trio's trademark harmonies."

On its promotional video, Barry, Robin and Maurice perform in front of an audience of children with Barry and Maurice on acoustic guitars. The video was later premiered on Solid Gold.

== Personnel ==
- Barry Gibb – lead and harmony vocal, acoustic guitar
- Robin Gibb – backing vocal
- Maurice Gibb – backing vocal, acoustic guitar
- Richard Tee – piano
- Albhy Galuten – synthesizers
- Chuck Kirkpatrick – guitar
- George Terry – guitar
- Jeff Porcaro – drums
- Ralph McDonald – percussion

== Charts ==
| Chart (1981–82) | Peak position |
|---|---|
| Austria (Ö3 Austria Top 40) | 7 |
| Belgium (Ultratop 50) | 37 |
| Canada Adult Contemporary (RPM) | 14 |
| Germany (Media Control Charts) | 58 |
| Netherlands (Dutch Top 40) | 41 |
| US Billboard Hot 100 | 45 |
| US Cash Box Top 100 | 40 |
| US Record World | 43 |
