= The Woman in You =

Single by Bee Gees

from the album Staying Alive
- B-side: "The Woman In You" (Instrumental)
- Released: May 1983 (US); July 1983 (UK)
- Recorded: March 1983
- Genre: Pop rock
- Length: 4:01 (single version); 5:43 (extended version)
- Label: RSO
- Songwriters: Barry, Robin & Maurice Gibb
- Producers: Bee Gees, Albhy Galuten, Karl Richardson

Bee Gees singles chronology
"Living Eyes" (1981)	"The Woman in You" (1983)	"Someone Belonging to Someone" (1983)

"The Woman in You" is one of five songs the Bee Gees contributed to the film, Staying Alive, the sequel to Saturday Night Fever. It was their most recent song on that time to reach the Top 40 on Billboard Hot 100 chart until 1989's "One" (after a six-year gap).

== History and background ==
"The Woman in You" was the last track recorded for Staying Alive, and the lead single from the soundtrack. Director Sylvester Stallone used the Bee Gees songs in the movie more as background music rather than the prominent way Saturday Night Fever had featured them. The single received more airplay than the Bee Gees previous two singles, though not enough to reach a top 10 position. In interviews following the release of the film, the brothers expressed their displeasure at the way their songs were edited and revealed that their hearts were not in the music. By 1983, the Bee Gees were focusing their talents on solo projects and production of other artists, so it is not surprising that they were not all enthusiastic about the Staying Alive movie.

== Reception ==
Cash Box said that "the keyboards, horns and funk beat make for a tougher sound" than the Bee Gees Saturday Night Fever songs but that "the end result is equally tuneful."

== Music video ==
The video, directed by Brian Grant and conceptualised by Keith Williams, which did air in rotation on MTV, featured each brother in a working class job where they all come in contact with the same woman (Cynthia Rhodes) who lures them away.

== Chart performance ==
Chart (1983)	Peak position
Australia	73
Belgium	16
Canada AC	1
France	23
Germany (GfK)	23
The Netherlands	21
Spain	2
United Kingdom	81
US Billboard Hot 100	24
