= Cynthia Rhodes =

American actress (born 1956)

- Born: November 21, 1956 (age 69); Nashville, Tennessee, U.S.
- Occupations: Actress; singer; dancer
- Years active: 1970–1991
- Spouse: Richard Marx (m. 1989; div. 2014)
- Children: 3

Cynthia Rhodes (born November 21, 1956) is an American retired actress, singer and dancer. She appeared in the films Flashdance (1983), Staying Alive (1983), and Dirty Dancing (1987). Rhodes was also a member of the synth-pop group Animotion, and sang lead on their 1989 US Top 10 hit single "Room to Move".

== Early life and education ==
Cynthia Rhodes was born on November 21, 1956, in Nashville, Tennessee. She was raised in a Baptist family.

== Career ==
Rhodes began her show business career working at Opryland USA during the 1970s.

She tried to maintain a clean-cut image in her acting roles and in the media, turning down scripts that required nudity and refusing offers to pose for pictorials in Playboy magazine. Sylvester Stallone, the director of Staying Alive, stated that Rhodes "would sooner quit the business before doing anything to embarrass her parents."

Rhodes played a small role in the fantasy musical Xanadu (1980). Here she met the San Francisco rock band The Tubes, who were also featured in the movie. This led Cynthia to be included in the Tubes dancing team, performing live with the band from May 1981 to December 1982. In 1982 she appeared in a video production called "The Tubes Video" directed by Russell Mulcahy and choreographed by Kenny Ortega. This 52-minute long-form music video featured Rhodes as one of three backup dancers for The Tubes and includes hits such as "Talk to You Later", "Sushi Girl", "Sports Fans" and "Mondo Bondage". Her next role was as Tina Tech in the musical film Flashdance. After Flashdance, Rhodes was cast opposite John Travolta in Sylvester Stallone's 1983 film Staying Alive, a sequel to the 1977 hit film Saturday Night Fever. Rhodes's character, Jackie, was an ensemble dancer, bar band singer, and sometime love interest of Travolta's character. While poorly reviewed, the film was commercially successful.

Rhodes garnered her first non-dance related role in Michael Crichton's 1984 science fiction thriller Runaway with Tom Selleck, Kirstie Alley and Gene Simmons. Her most notable role was as dance instructor Penny Johnson in the hit 1987 motion picture Dirty Dancing with Jennifer Grey and Patrick Swayze. Rhodes's final motion picture role was the character of Vickie Phillips, playing opposite Jameson Parker, in the sleeper action-adventure movie Curse of the Crystal Eye.

Rhodes also appeared as a dancer in a number of music videos, including "Rosanna" by the band Toto, "The Woman in You" by the Bee Gees, and "Don't Mean Nothing" by Richard Marx. She was a dancer for the glam rock band The Tubes when they toured in the early 1980s. Rhodes later joined the pop group Animotion, replacing their lead singer Astrid Plane, for the recording of their third album of original material. Though the group's single "Room to Move" (from the film My Stepmother Is an Alien) rose to No. 9 on the Billboard charts, the album failed to match the group's earlier success, peaking at only No. 110 on the pop charts; shortly thereafter, the group disbanded.

In 2002, Rhodes co-wrote the smooth jazz track "Perfect Day" with then-husband Richard Marx for December, trumpeter Chris Botti's holiday album.

== Personal life ==
Rhodes was married to singer-songwriter Richard Marx. They met in 1983 while Marx was working on the motion picture soundtrack for Staying Alive. Rhodes, who is seven years older than Marx, thought he was much too young for her to date at the time. Marx and Rhodes did not start their relationship until two years later, when they reacquainted at a party. After a four-year courtship, the couple married on January 8, 1989. After marrying Marx and giving birth to three boys, Rhodes retired from her performing career to raise her family. The couple divorced in 2014, after 25 years of marriage.

== Discography ==
=== with Animotion ===
- Animotion (1989)

=== Soundtrack appearances ===
- "Finding Out the Hard Way", "I'm Never Gonna Give You Up" with Frank Stallone (from Staying Alive) (1983)
- "Room to Move" with Animotion (from My Stepmother Is an Alien) (1988)

=== Music video appearances ===
- Rosanna (1982) - Toto
- Don't Mean Nothing (1987) - Richard Marx
- Christmas Spirit (2011) - Richard Marx

== Filmography ==
Year	Title	Role	Notes
1980	Xanadu	Ensemble dancer	
1983	Flashdance	Tina Tech	
1983	Staying Alive	Jackie Cole	
1984	Fantasy Island	Marlise	Episode: "Goin' on Home/Ambitious Lady"
1984	Runaway	Officer Karen Thompson	
1985	Pee-wee's Big Adventure	Jamie	
1987	Dirty Dancing	Penny Johnson	
1991	Curse of the Crystal Eye	Vickie Phillips	
