= Stallone (name) =

Stallone is an Italian surname and a given name, meaning either "stallion" or "cow stable". Notable persons with that name include:

== Given name ==
- Stallone Limbombe (born 1991), Belgian footballer

== Surname ==
- Frank Stallone Sr. (1919–2011), Italian-American hairdresser, polo enthusiast, writer, and one-time actor
- Frank Stallone Jr. (born 1950), American musician and actor; son of Frank and Jackie
- Jackie Stallone (1921–2020), American astrologer, dancer and wrestling promoter
- Sage Stallone (1976–2012), American musician, actor and film producer/director; son of Sylvester
- Sistine Stallone (born 1998), American model and actress; daughter of Sylvester
- Sylvester Stallone (born 1946), American actor, screenwriter and film producer/director; son of Frank and Jackie
