= Golden Globe Ambassador =

Presenter at the Golden Globe Awards

The Golden Globe Ambassador, until 2017 Miss Golden Globe or Mr. Golden Globe, is the young person who assists in the annual Golden Globe Awards presentations by handing out trophies to the winners and escorting them off stage.

== History ==
The first Miss Golden Globe was named in 1963. Since 1971, the position has been held by a celebrity's daughter, or occasionally a son, or both. Parents have fiercely competed for their child to take the role, which is awarded by the Hollywood Foreign Press Association's president from among candidates selected by the association's board. Being active on social media is part of the selection criteria.

Several Miss Golden Globes later became noted actors and Golden Globe winners in their own right, including Anne Archer (1971), Melanie Griffith (1975) (and her daughter, Dakota Johnson, in 2006), and Laura Dern (1982). Being selected as Miss Golden Globe has helped start a media career for some, such as through obtaining modeling campaigns or photo shootings.

In 2018, the role was renamed from "Miss Golden Globe" to "Golden Globe Ambassador" to make it gender-neutral and more inclusive.

The Golden Globe Ambassador role was discontinued after the 2021 ceremony in the context of controversies over representation within the sponsoring organization and the ultimate restructuring of the sponsorship and ceremony.

== List ==
Honorees
Year	Name	Parents	Age
1963	Eva Six		26
1963	Donna Douglas		30
1964	Linda Evans		22
1966	Cheryl Miller		23
1967	Corinna Tsopei		23
1968	Alexandra Hay		21
1969	Francoise Ruggieri		30
1971	Anne Archer	John Archer and Marjorie Lord	24
1972	Pamela Powell	Dick Powell and June Allyson	24
1973	Kelley Miles	Bob Miles and Vera Miles	21
1974	Linda Meiklejohn	William W Meiklejohn and Charlotte Jeter	33
1975	Melanie Griffith	Peter Griffith and Tippi Hedren	18
1976	Lisa Farringer		
1977	Nicole Ericson	John Ericson and Milly Coury	
1978	Elizabeth Stack	Robert Stack and Rosemarie Bowe	22
1979	Stephanie Haymes	Dick Haymes and Fran Jeffries	20
1980	Kym Karath		22
1981	Rosanne Katon		27
1982	Laura Dern	Bruce Dern and Diane Ladd	15
1983	Lori Leonelli		
1983	Rhonda Shear		28
1984	Anita Finch	Peter Finch and Tamara Tchinarova	35
1985	Lisabeth Shatner	William Shatner and Gloria Rand	24
1986	Calista Carradine	David Carradine and Donna Lee Becht	24
1987	Candace Savalas	Telly Savalas and Marilyn Gardner	24
1988	Gigi Garner	James Garner and Lois Garner	30
1989	Kyle Aletter	Frank Aletter and Lee Meriwether	29
1990	Katharine Kramer	Stanley Kramer and Karen Sharpe-Kramer	
1991	Kaitlin Hopkins	Gene Persson and Shirley Knight	26
1992	Joely Fisher	Eddie Fisher and Connie Stevens	24
1993	Erin Hamilton	Joe Hamilton and Carol Burnett	24
1994	Alexandrea Martin	Alvin Martin and Whoopi Goldberg	21
1995	John Clark Gable	Clark Gable and Kay Williams Gable	34
1996	Jaime Nicole Dudney	Ken Dudney and Barbara Mandrell	20
1996	Freddie Prinze, Jr.	Freddie Prinze and Kathy Elaine Cochran	19
1997	Kehly Sloane	Ed Thrasher and Linda Gray	31
1998	Clementine Ford	David Ford and Cybill Shepherd	19
1999	Tori Reid	Tim Reid and Rita Reid	28
2000	Liza Huber	Helmut Huber and Susan Lucci	24
2001	Katie Flynn	David Flynn and Jane Seymour	19
2002	Haley Giraldo	Neil Giraldo and Pat Benatar	17
2003	Dominik Garcia-Lorido	Andy García and María Victoria Lorido	19
2003	AJ Lamas	Lorenzo Lamas and Michele Smith	19
2004	Lily Costner	Kevin Costner and Cindy Costner	18
2005	Kathryn Eastwood	Clint Eastwood and Jacelyn Reeves	17
2006	Dakota Johnson	Don Johnson and 1975 Miss Golden Globe Melanie Griffith	16
2007	Lorraine Nicholson	Jack Nicholson and Rebecca Broussard	16
2008	none	(note: the traditional awards ceremony did not take place due to WGA strike)	
2009	Rumer Willis	Bruce Willis and Demi Moore	20
2010	Mavis Spencer	Roderick Spencer and Alfre Woodard	18
2011	Gia Mantegna	Joe Mantegna and Arlene Mantegna	20
2012	Rainey Qualley	Paul Qualley and Andie MacDowell	22
2013	Francesca Eastwood	Clint Eastwood and Frances Fisher (and half sister of 2005 Miss Golden Globe)	19
2013	Sam Michael Fox	Michael J. Fox and Tracy Pollan	23
2014	Sosie Bacon	Kevin Bacon and Kyra Sedgwick	21
2015	Greer Grammer	Kelsey Grammer and Barrie Buckner	22
2016	Corinne Foxx	Jamie Foxx and Connie Kline	21
2017	Sophia Stallone	Sylvester Stallone and Jennifer Flavin	20
2017	Sistine Stallone	Sylvester Stallone and Jennifer Flavin	18
2017	Scarlet Stallone	Sylvester Stallone and Jennifer Flavin	14
2018	Simone Garcia Johnson	Dwayne Johnson and Dany Garcia	16
2019	Isan Elba	Idris Elba and Hanne Kim Nørgaard	16
2020	Dylan Brosnan	Pierce Brosnan and Keely Shaye Smith	22
2020	Paris Brosnan	Pierce Brosnan and Keely Shaye Smith	18
2021	Jackson Lee	Spike Lee and Tonya Lewis Lee	
2021	Satchel Lee	Spike Lee and Tonya Lewis Lee	
2022	none	(note: the traditional awards ceremony was not televised due to the media boycott of the HFPA)	
