= Gaudenzio =

Gaudenzio is an Italian masculine given name. It arose from the Latin Gaudentius which means happy.

Notable persons with that name include:

== People with the given name Gaudenzio ==
- Gaudenzio Bernasconi, Italian footballer
- Gaudenzio Botti, Italian painter
- Gaudenzio Ferrari, Italian painter
- Gaudenzio Godioz, Italian skier
- Gaudenzio Marconi, Italian photographer
- Gaudenzio Meneghesso, Italian engineer
- Gaudenzio Poli
- Carlo Gaudenzio Madruzzo, Italian Catholic cardinal
