= Sylvester Stallone =

American actor and filmmaker (born 1946)

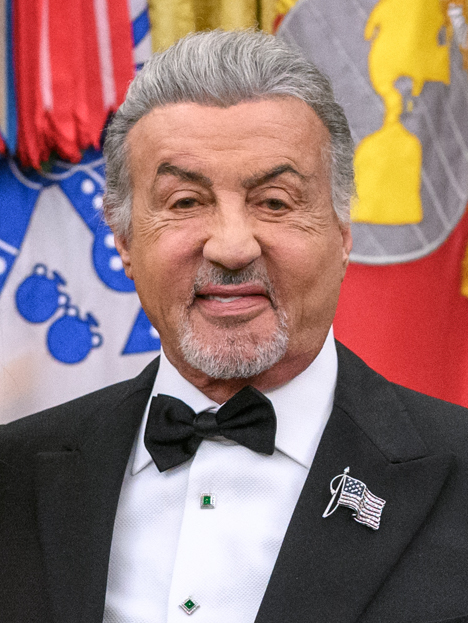
- Stallone in 2025
- Born: Sylvester Gardenzio Stallone; July 6, 1946 (age 80); New York City, U.S.
- Other name: "Sly" Stallone
- Education: University of Miami (BFA)
- Occupations: Actor; director; screenwriter; producer
- Years active: 1968–present
- Works: Filmography
- Spouses: Sasha Czack (m. 1974; div. 1985) Brigitte Nielsen (m. 1985; div. 1987) Jennifer Flavin (m. 1997)
- Children: 5, including Sage Stallone and Sistine Stallone
- Parents: Frank Stallone Sr. (father); Jackie Stallone (mother)
- Relatives: Frank Stallone (brother)
- Awards: Full list
- Website: sylvesterstallone.com

Sylvester Gardenzio Stallone (born July 6, 1946) is an American actor and filmmaker. He rose to fame as an action star for his memorable portrayals of boxer Rocky Balboa in the Rocky franchise (1976–present) and of soldier John Rambo in the Rambo franchise (1982–2019). Stallone usually portrayed underdog characters who conquer seemingly impossible challenges through perseverance and determination in his films, and his physically expressive and emotionally charged style of acting redefined the action hero.

Stallone took early roles in The Lords of Flatbush (1974) and Death Race 2000 (1975) before achieving stardom, writing the role of and portraying boxer Robert "Rocky" Balboa in the Rocky franchise (1976–present). For Rocky (1976) he was nominated for two Academy Awards for Best Original Screenplay and Best Actor. He went on to reprise the role in Creed (2015) and Creed II (2018), the former of which earned him a nomination for the Academy Award for Best Supporting Actor as well as a Golden Globe Award for Best Supporting Actor – Motion Picture win.

Stallone also portrayed John Rambo in First Blood (1982), a role he would play across five Rambo films (1982–2019) which he also co-wrote. He went on to become, from the mid-1980s to the late 1990s, one of Hollywood's highest-paid actors, acting in films such as Rhinestone (1984), Cobra (1986), Over the Top (1987), Tango and Cash (1989), Oscar (1991), Cliffhanger, Demolition Man (both 1993), The Specialist (1994), and Cop Land (1997). He later acted in The Expendables film franchise (2010–2014) and the Escape Plan film series (2013–2019). He portrayed Stakar Ogord in the Marvel Cinematic Universe films Guardians of the Galaxy Vol. 2 (2017) and Guardians of the Galaxy Vol. 3 (2023).

In television, he has starred in the Paramount+ crime series Tulsa King (2022–present) and the reality series The Family Stallone (2023–2024), both of which he also served as an executive producer. Stallone is also a noted art collector and painter, and has written books on fitness.

== Early life ==
Sylvester Gardenzio Stallone was born in Hell's Kitchen in New York City on July 6, 1946, the elder son of celebrity astrologer and women's professional wrestling promoter Jacqueline "Jackie" Stallone (née Labofish; 1921–2020) and hairdresser Francesco "Frank" Stallone Sr. (1919–2011), who opened up and ran a group of hair salons in Maryland and was an avid polo player. His mother was an American from Washington, D.C., with Breton French and Ukrainian Jewish ancestry, while his father was an Italian immigrant from Gioia del Colle who moved to the U.S. in the 1930s. His younger brother is actor and musician Frank Stallone. Many biographies of Stallone indicate that his birth name is "Michael Sylvester Gardenzio Stallone" and his mother explained in an interview that she originally named him "Tyrone" because she admired the actor Tyrone Power, but Stallone's father changed it to "Sylvester". His nickname as a child was "Binky" but he chose to go by the nickname of Mike/Michael after schoolmates began calling him "Stinky". His middle name "Gardenzio" is an alteration of the Italian given name "Gaudenzio" and he usually shortened it to "Enzio".

Complications during Stallone's birth forced his mother's obstetricians to use two pairs of forceps while delivering him, accidentally severing a nerve in the process. This caused paralysis of the lower left side of his face (including parts of his lip, tongue, and chin) which gave him his signature snarling look and slurred speech. As a result, he was bullied in his childhood, with which he coped by getting into bodybuilding and acting. A guidance counselor once told Stallone's mother: "Your son is suited to run a sorting machine or to be an assistant electrician, primarily in the area of elevator operations"; nevertheless, Sylvester aspired to be an actor and a screenwriter.

Stallone spent part of his infancy in foster and boarding care, rejoining and moving back with his family to Maryland when he was five. In the early 1950s, his father moved the family to his mother's native Washington, D.C. to open a beauty school. In 1954, his mother opened a women's gym called Barbella's. He initially stayed with his father following his parents' divorce when he was 11, but joined his remarried mother in Philadelphia when he was 15.

At one point, Stallone was voted "Most Likely to End Up in the Electric Chair" in high school; nevertheless, Stallone attended Notre Dame Academy and Abraham Lincoln High School in Philadelphia, and Charlotte Hall Military Academy in Charlotte Hall, Maryland, prior to attending Miami Dade College. He spent two years, from September 1965 to June 1967, at the American College of Switzerland. He returned to the United States to study as a drama major at the University of Miami, from 1967 to 1969, but did not graduate. Decades later, after Stallone's request that his acting and life experiences be accepted in exchange for his remaining needed college credits to graduate, he was granted a Bachelor of Fine Arts (BFA) degree by the University of Miami in 1998.

== Film and stage career ==
=== 1968–1976: Early roles to breakthrough ===
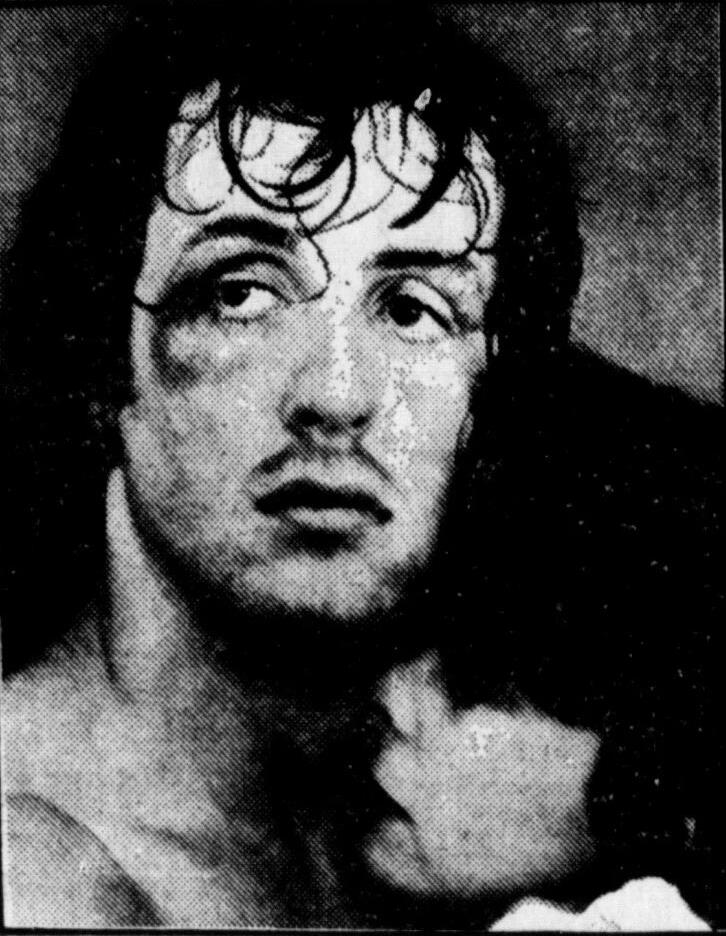
Stallone as Rocky Balboa with Adrian (Talia Shire) in Rocky (1976)

Until 1969, he appeared on the stage under the name Mike Stallone; in 1970, he started using the stage name Sylvester E. Stallone. While attending the University of Miami, Stallone had a role in the drama That Nice Boy (aka The Square Root), filmed in 1968. Moreover, he and John Herzfeld worked together in 1969 on a low-budget self-produced film called "Horses".

Stallone had his first starring role in the softcore pornography feature film The Party at Kitty and Stud's (1970). He was paid US$200 for two days' work. Stallone later explained that he had done the film out of desperation after being evicted from his apartment and finding himself homeless for several days. He has also said that he slept three weeks in the Port Authority Bus Terminal in New York City prior to seeing a casting notice for the film. In the actor's words, "it was either do that movie or rob someone, because I was at the end – the very end – of my rope". The film was released several years later as Italian Stallion, in order to cash in on Stallone's newfound fame (the new title was taken from Stallone's nickname since Rocky). Stallone also starred in the erotic off-Broadway stage play Score which ran for 23 performances at the Martinique Theatre from October 28 to November 15, 1971, and was later made into the 1974 film Score by Radley Metzger.

After moving to New York City, Stallone shared an apartment with his girlfriend, Sasha Czack, an aspiring actress who supported them by working as a waitress. Stallone took odd jobs around this time, including being a cleaner at a zoo, and a theater usher; he was fired from the latter for scalping tickets. He furthered his writing skills by frequenting a local library, and became interested in the works of Edgar Allan Poe.

In 1972, Stallone was on the verge of giving up on having an acting career; in what he later described as a low point, he tried and failed to get a job as an extra in The Godfather. Instead, he was relegated to a background role in another Hollywood hit, What's Up, Doc?, starring Barbra Streisand. Stallone is hardly visible in his two appearances.

Stallone happened to be acting in a play that a friend invited him to partake in, and an agent in attendance thought that Stallone fit the role of Stanley, a main character in The Lords of Flatbush, which had a start-stop schedule from 1972 to 1974 over budget issues. Stallone, around mid-1973, achieved his first proper starring role, in the independent film No Place to Hide, playing a man who is associated with a New York–based urban terrorist movement, with a jewelry-seller as his love interest. The film was re-cut and retitled Rebel years later, this second version featuring Stallone as its star. In 1990, this film was re-edited with outtakes from the original film and newly shot matching footage, then redubbed – in the style of Woody Allen's What's Up, Tiger Lily? – into a parody of itself titled A Man Called... Rainbo.

Stallone's other first few film roles were minor, and included brief uncredited appearances in M*A*S*H (1970), as a soldier sitting at a table; Pigeons (1970), as a party guest; Woody Allen's Bananas (1971), as a subway thug; in the psychological thriller Klute (1971), as an extra dancing in a club; and in the Jack Lemmon film The Prisoner of Second Avenue (1975), as a youth. In the latter film, Jack Lemmon's character chases, tackles, and mugs Stallone, thinking that Stallone's character is a pickpocket. He had his second starring role in 1974, in The Lords of Flatbush. In 1975, he played supporting roles in Farewell, My Lovely; Capone; and Death Race 2000. He made guest appearances on the TV series Police Story and Kojak. He is also supposedly in Mandingo. It is often said that his scene was deleted.

Stallone gained worldwide fame with his starring role in the smash hit Rocky (1976), a sports drama about a struggling boxer, Rocky Balboa, taking on heavyweight champion Apollo Creed. On March 24, 1975, Stallone saw the Muhammad Ali vs. Chuck Wepner fight. That night Stallone went home, and after three days he had completed the first draft of Rocky. Stallone subsequently denied that Wepner provided any inspiration for the script; however, Wepner filed a lawsuit which was eventually settled with Stallone for an undisclosed amount. Other possible inspirations for the film may have included Rocky Graziano's autobiography Somebody Up There Likes Me, and the film of the same name. Stallone attempted to sell the script to multiple studios, with the intention of playing the lead role himself. Irwin Winkler and Robert Chartoff became interested and offered Stallone US$350,000 for the rights, but they had their own casting ideas for the lead role, including Robert Redford and Burt Reynolds. Stallone refused to sell unless he played the lead character – and, eventually, after a substantial budget cut to compromise, it was agreed he could be the star. Upon its release, critic Roger Ebert stated that Stallone could become the next Marlon Brando.

In 1977, at the 49th Academy Awards, Rocky was nominated for ten Oscars, including Best Actor and Best Original Screenplay nominations for Stallone. The film went on to win the Academy Awards for Best Picture, Best Directing, and Best Film Editing. Rocky has since been inducted into the National Film Registry and had its props placed in the Smithsonian Museum. Stallone's use of the front entrance to the Philadelphia Museum of Art in the Rocky series led the area to be nicknamed the Rocky Steps, where a statue of the character, owned by Stallone, stood at the bottom until 2026 except for a brief period where it was in South Philadelphia. The character was also voted into the International Boxing Hall of Fame.

=== 1978–1989: Subsequent success ===
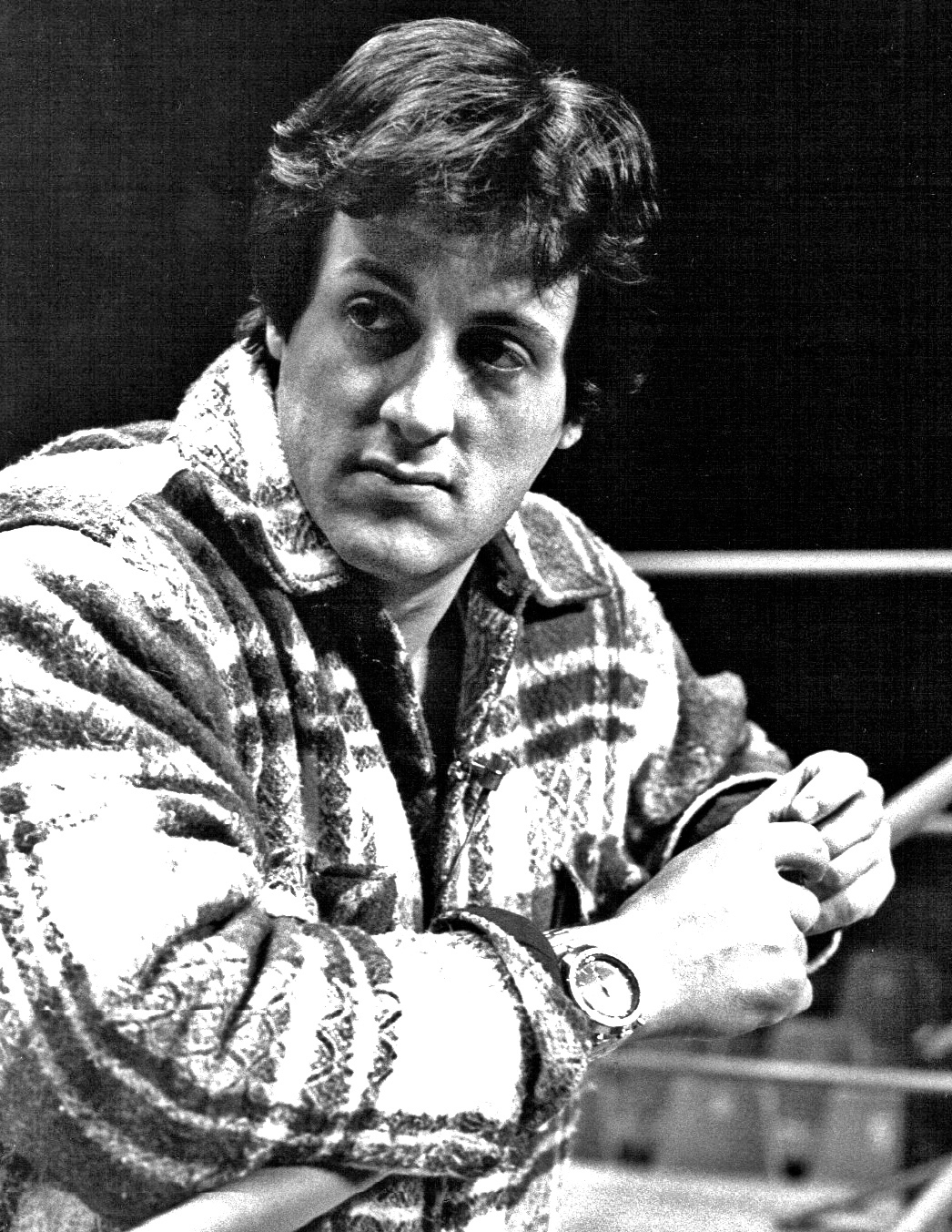
Stallone at the Ken Norton vs. Duane Bobick boxing match in 1977

Stallone made his directorial debut and starred in the 1978 film Paradise Alley, a family drama in which he played one of three brothers who get involved in professional wrestling. That same year, he starred in Norman Jewison's F.I.S.T., a social drama in which he plays a warehouse worker, very loosely modeled on James Hoffa, who becomes involved in labor union leadership. In 1979, he wrote, directed (replacing John G. Avildsen), and starred in Rocky II. The sequel became a major success, grossing US$200 million.

In 1981, he starred alongside Michael Caine and soccer star Pelé in Escape to Victory, a sports drama in which he plays a prisoner of war involved in a Nazi propaganda soccer game. That same year, he starred in the thriller Nighthawks, in which he plays a New York city cop who plays a cat-and-mouse game with a foreign terrorist, played by Rutger Hauer.

In 1982, Stallone starred as Vietnam veteran John Rambo, a former Green Beret, in the action film First Blood, an adaptation of the eponymous novel by David Morell, though the script was significantly altered by Stallone during the film's production, which was both a critical and box-office success. Critics praised Stallone's performance, saying he made Rambo seem human, as opposed to the way he is portrayed in the book of the same name. It launched the Rambo franchise. That year Rocky III was released in which Stallone wrote, directed, and starred. The second sequel became a box-office success. In preparation for these roles, Stallone embarked upon a vigorous training regimen, which often meant six days a week in the gym and further sit-ups in the evenings. Stallone claims to have reduced his body fat percentage to his all-time low of 2.8% for Rocky III.

In 1983, he directed Staying Alive, the sequel to Saturday Night Fever, starring John Travolta. This was the only film Stallone directed that he did not star in. Staying Alive was universally panned by film critics. Despite being a critical failure, Staying Alive was a commercial success. The film opened with the biggest weekend for a musical film ever (at the time) with a gross of $12,146,143 from 1,660 screens. Overall, the film grossed nearly $65 million in the US box office against its $22 million budget. Worldwide it grossed $127 million. Though the US box-office intake was significantly less than the $139.5 million earned by Saturday Night Fever, the film nevertheless ranked in the top ten most financially successful films of 1983.

During the 1980s, Stallone was considered one of the biggest action film stars in the world, along with Arnold Schwarzenegger. The Schwarzenegger-Stallone rivalry continued for years; they attacked each other in the press, and tried to surpass the other with more on-screen killings and larger weapons.

Stallone occasionally attempted, albeit unsuccessfully, roles in different genres. In 1984, he co-wrote and starred alongside Dolly Parton in the comedy film Rhinestone, where he played a wannabe country music singer. For the Rhinestone soundtrack, he performed a song. Stallone turned down the lead male role in Romancing the Stone to make Rhinestone instead, a decision he later regretted.

In 1985, Stallone continued his success with the Rocky and Rambo franchises with Rocky IV and Rambo: First Blood Part II. Stallone has portrayed these two characters in a total of 13 films. Stallone met former Mr. Olympia Franco Columbu to develop his character's appearance for the film Rocky IV, just as if he were preparing for the Mr. Olympia competition. That meant two workouts a day, six days a week. Both films were major financial successes.

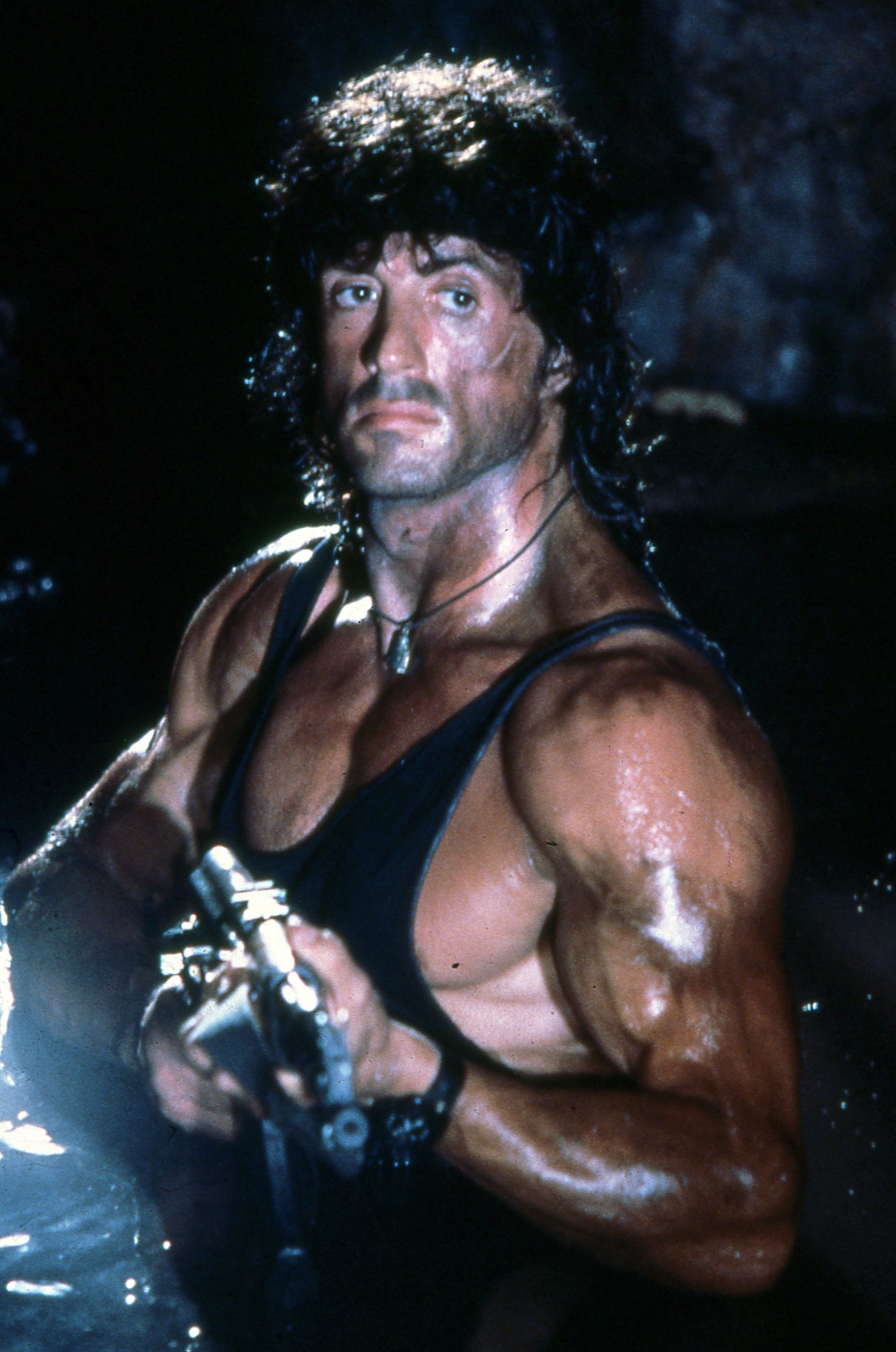
Stallone as John Rambo in Rambo III (1988)

It was around 1985 that Stallone was signed to a remake of the 1939 James Cagney classic Angels with Dirty Faces. The film would form part of his multi-picture deal with Cannon Films and was to co-star Christopher Reeve and be directed by Menahem Golan. The re-making of such a beloved classic was met with disapproval by Variety and horror by top critic Roger Ebert. Cannon opted to make the action film Cobra which was released in 1986 and became a box-office success. It led to the setting up of his production company White Eagle Enterprises.

In 1987, he starred in the family drama Over the Top as a struggling trucker who tries to make amends with his estranged son and enters an arm wrestling competition. This was poorly received by critics and was a box-office failure. In 1989, he co-starred alongside Kurt Russell in the buddy cop action film Tango & Cash, which did solid business domestically and overseas, grossing US$57 million in foreign markets and over US$120 million worldwide. Stallone became a boxing promoter in the 1980s. His boxing promoting company, Tiger Eye Productions, signed world champion boxers Sean O'Grady and Aaron Pryor.

=== 1990–1999: Career fluctuations ===
Stallone began the 1990s starring in the fifth installment of the Rocky franchise, Rocky V. This film brought back the first film's director, John G. Avildsen, and was intended to be the final installment in the series at the time. It was considered a box-office disappointment and received negative reviews.

Stallone next appeared in John Landis' period comedy Oscar which was both a critical and box-office failure. In 1992, he appeared in Roger Spottiswoode's action comedy Stop! Or My Mom Will Shoot which was also both a critical and box-office disaster. Stallone signed onto the film based on rumors that Schwarzenegger was interested in the lead. Schwarzenegger said that, knowing the script's quality was poor, he publicly faked interest in starring for producers to lure Stallone.

In 1993, he made a comeback with Renny Harlin's action thriller Cliffhanger, which was a success in the US, grossing US$84 million, and worldwide, grossing US$171 million. Later that year, he starred in the futuristic action film Demolition Man directed by Marco Brambilla, co-starring Wesley Snipes and Sandra Bullock. On Rotten Tomatoes the film has an approval rating of 60% based on 42 reviews, with an average rating of 5.43/10. The site's consensus reads: "A better-than-average sci-fi shoot-em-up with a satirical undercurrent, Demolition Man is bolstered by strong performances by Stallone, Snipes, and Bullock." The film debuted at No. 1 at the box office. Demolition Man grossed $58,055,768 by the end of its box-office run in North America and $159,055,768 worldwide.

His string of hits continued with 1994's The Specialist co-starring Sharon Stone and directed by Luis Llosa, which opened in the U.S. on October 7. While the critical reception was overwhelmingly negative, the film was a commercial success. In its opening weekend it made $14,317,765 and ended up making back its budget with $57,362,582 at the domestic box office while making another $113,000,000 overseas, giving it a worldwide gross of $170,362,582.

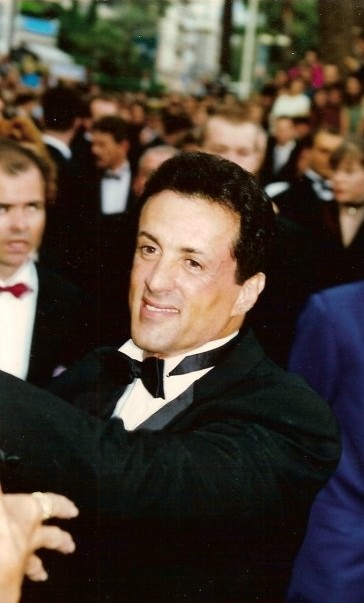
Stallone at the 1993 Cannes Film Festival

In 1995, he played the title character (from the British comic book 2000 AD) in the science fiction action film Judge Dredd. His overseas box-office appeal saved the domestic box-office disappointment of Judge Dredd, which cost almost US$100 million and barely made its budget back, with a worldwide tally of US$113 million. Despite the film's poor box-office performance, Stallone signed a three-picture deal with Universal Pictures for $60 million, making him the second star after Jim Carrey to receive $20 million per film. The deal expired in February 2000 without him making any films, however, so he received no payment.

That year, he also appeared in the thriller Assassins with Julianne Moore and Antonio Banderas. That same year, Stallone, along with an all-star cast of celebrities, appeared in the Trey Parker and Matt Stone short comedy film Your Studio and You commissioned by the Seagram Company for a party celebrating their acquisition of Universal Studios and the MCA Corporation. Stallone speaks in his Rocky Balboa voice with subtitles translating what he is saying. At one point, Stallone starts yelling about how can they use his Balboa character, that he left it in the past; the narrator calms him with a wine cooler and calling him "brainiac." In response, Stallone says, "Thank you very much." He then looks at the wine cooler and exclaims, "Stupid cheap studio!"

In 1996, he starred in the disaster film Daylight as a disgraced former emergency services chief who attempts to rescue survivors of an underground tunnel explosion. Daylight also underperformed at the domestic box office, grossing $33 million, but did better overseas and grossed a total of $158 million worldwide. In 1997, Stallone was cast against type as an overweight sheriff in the crime drama Cop Land in which he starred alongside Robert De Niro and Ray Liotta. The film was critically well-received and was a modest success at the box office, earning $63 million on a $15 million budget, and Stallone's performance earned him the Stockholm International Film Festival Best Actor Award. In 1998, he did voice-over work for the animated film Antz, which was a success domestically.

=== 2000–2005: Declining years ===
In 2000, Stallone starred in the thriller Get Carter, a remake of the 1971 British film of the same name, but the film was poorly received by both critics and audiences. Stallone's career declined considerably after his subsequent films Driven (2001), Avenging Angelo (2002) and D-Tox (2002) were also critical and commercial failures.

In 2003, he played a villainous role in the third installment of the Spy Kids series: Spy Kids 3-D: Game Over, which was a huge box-office success (almost US$200 million worldwide). Stallone also had a cameo appearance in the 2003 French film Taxi 3 as a passenger. Also that year, Stallone started to regain prominence for his supporting role in the neo-noir crime drama Shade which was only released in a limited fashion but was praised by critics. He was also attached to star and direct a film tentatively titled Rampart Scandal, which was to be about the murder of rappers Tupac Shakur and The Notorious B.I.G. and the surrounding Los Angeles Police Department corruption scandal. It was later titled Notorious but was shelved.

In 2005, alongside Sugar Ray Leonard, he was the co-presenter of the NBC reality television boxing competition series The Contender. That same year he also made a guest appearance in two episodes of the television series Las Vegas. That year, Stallone also inducted professional wrestling icon Hulk Hogan, who appeared in Rocky III as a wrestler named Thunderlips, into the WWE Hall of Fame; Stallone was also the person who offered Hogan the cameo in Rocky III. In August, Stallone released his book Sly Moves which claimed to be a guide to fitness and nutrition as well as a candid insight into his life and works from his own perspective. The book also contained many photographs of Stallone throughout the years as well as pictures of him performing exercises.

=== 2006–present: franchise films ===
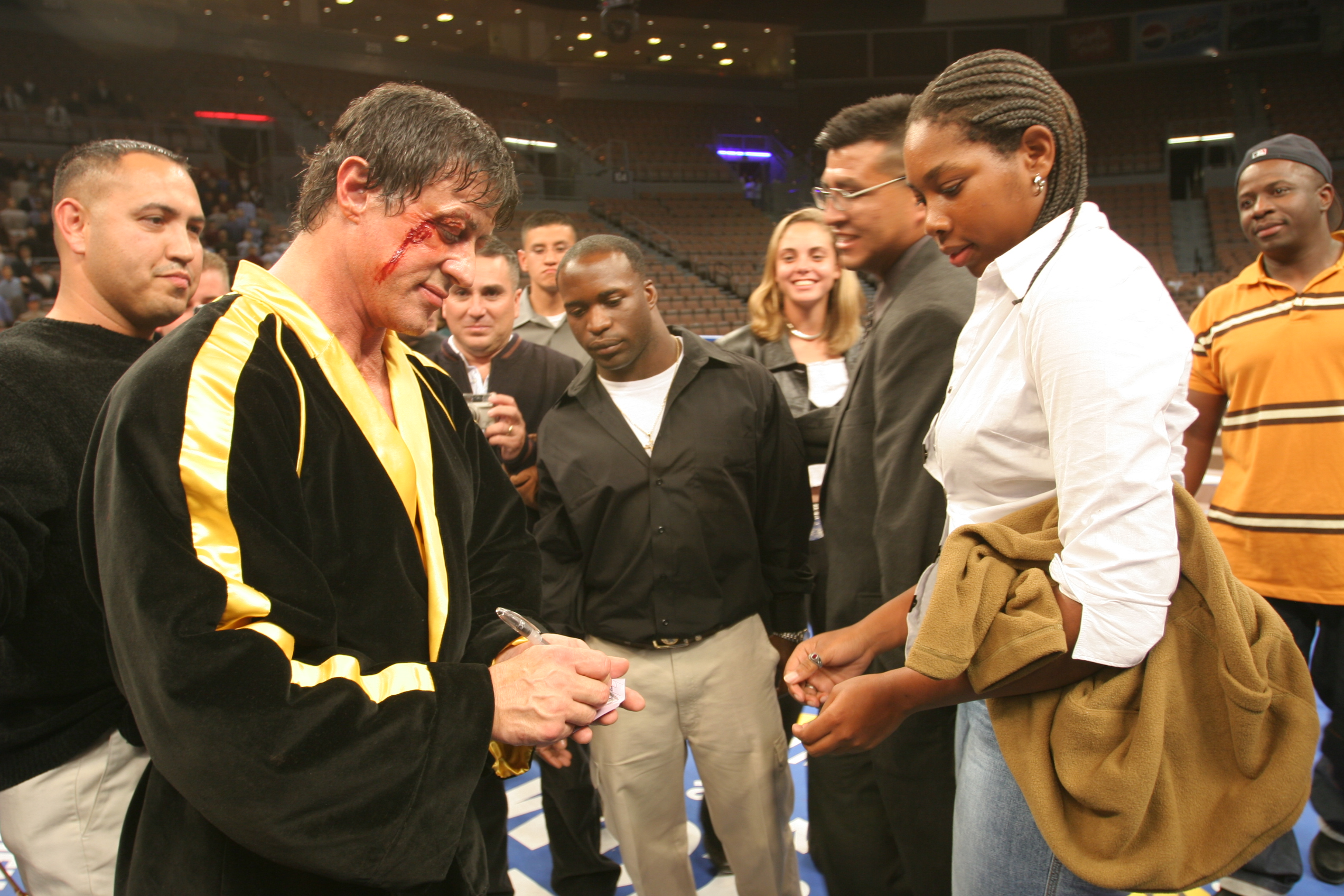
16 years after filming Rocky V, Stallone reprised his role as Rocky Balboa in 2006.

After a three-year hiatus from films, Stallone had a comeback in 2006 with the sixth installment of the Rocky series, Rocky Balboa, which was a critical and commercial hit. After the critical and box-office failure of the previous installment Rocky V, Stallone had decided to write, direct and star in a sixth installment which would be a more appropriate climax to the series. The total domestic box office came to US$70.3 million (and US$155.7 million worldwide). The budget of the film was only US$24 million. His performance in Rocky Balboa has been praised and garnered mostly positive reviews. That year, the development Death Wish remake began, when Stallone announced that he would be directing and starring in a remake of the 1974 film. Stallone said, "Instead of the Charles Bronson character being an architect, my version would have him as a very good cop who had incredible success without ever using his gun. So when the attack on his family happens, he's really thrown into a moral dilemma in proceeding to carry out his revenge." He later told the publication that he was no longer involved. In a 2009 interview with MTV, though, Stallone stated that he was again considering the project. However the role went to Bruce Willis, with Eli Roth as director.

Stallone partnered with a beverage company producing an upscale bottled water brand called Sly Water.

In 2006, Stallone expressed his desire to direct a film about Musa Dagh, adapted by Franz Werfel's novel The Forty Days of Musa Dagh, detailing the genocide of its Armenian community in 1915.

In 2008, Stallone reprised his other famous role in the fourth installment of the Rambo franchise, titled simply Rambo (John Rambo in some countries where the first film was titled Rambo). The film opened in 2,751 theaters on January 25, 2008, grossing US$6,490,000 on its opening day and US$18,200,000 over its opening weekend. Its box office was US$113,244,290 worldwide with a budget of US$50 million.

In July 2009, Stallone made a cameo appearance in the Bollywood film Kambakkht Ishq, where he played himself.

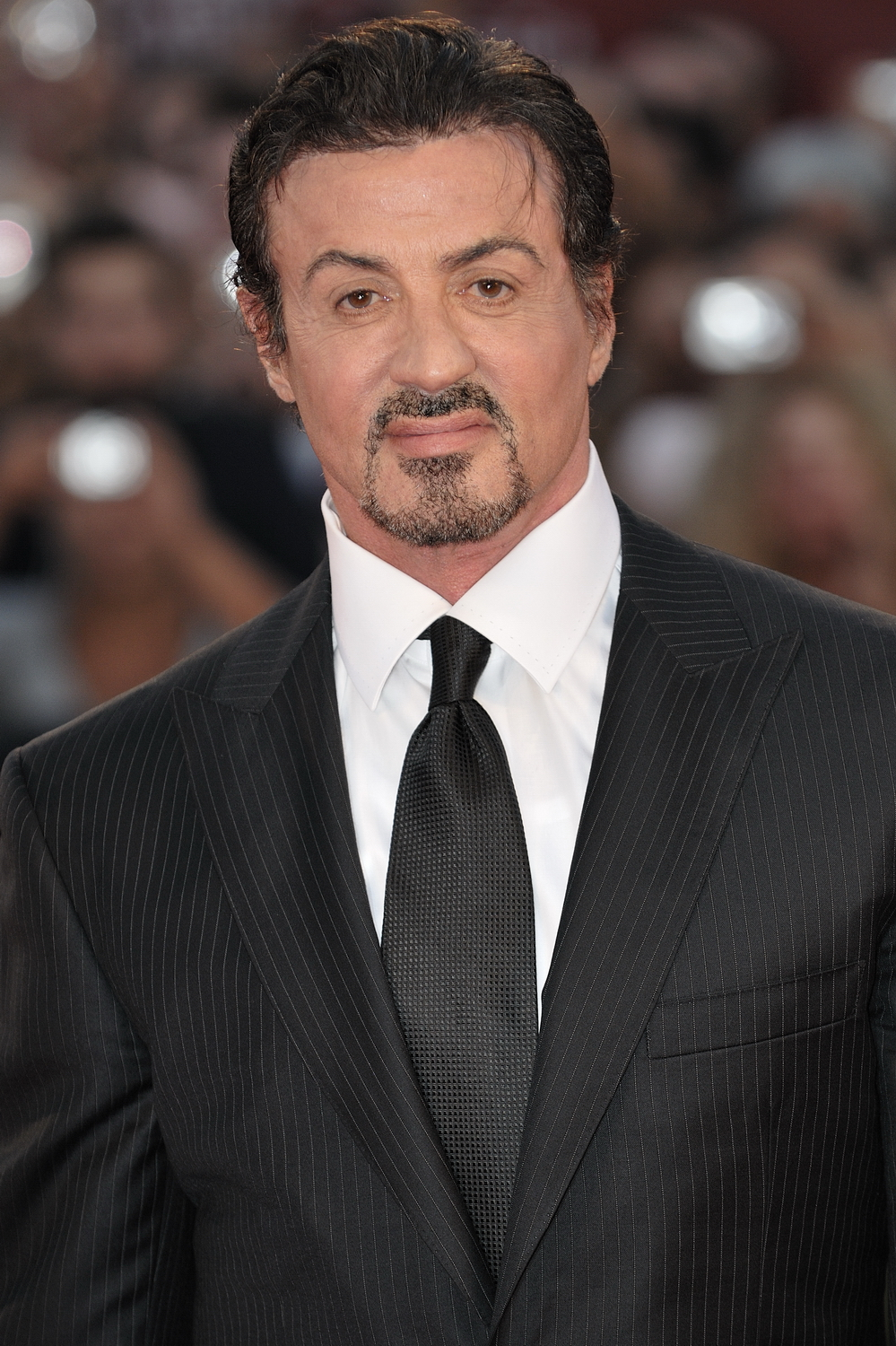
Stallone in 2009 at the 66th Venice International Film Festival

It was announced on December 7, 2010, that Stallone was voted into the International Boxing Hall of Fame in the non-participant category.

Also that year, Stallone wrote, directed and starred in the ensemble action film The Expendables. The film, which was filmed during summer/winter 2009, was released on August 13, 2010. Joining him in the film were fellow action stars Jason Statham, Jet Li, and Dolph Lundgren, as well as Terry Crews, Mickey Rourke, Randy Couture, Eric Roberts, and Stone Cold Steve Austin, and cameos by fellow '80s action icons Bruce Willis and Arnold Schwarzenegger. The film took US$34,825,135 in its opening weekend, going straight in at No. 1 in the US box office. The figure marked the biggest opening weekend in Stallone's career. In summer 2010, Brazilian company O2 Filmes released a statement saying it was still owed more than US$2 million for its work on the film. In 2011, Stallone provided the voice of a lion in Kevin James' comedy Zookeeper.

The Expendables 2 was released August 17, 2012; the sequel received a positive critical reception of 67% on Rotten Tomatoes, as opposed to the original's 41%. As well as returning cast members from the first film, the ensemble cast also included Jean-Claude Van Damme and Chuck Norris. That year, Stallone co-wrote the book for the Broadway musical adaptation of Rocky.

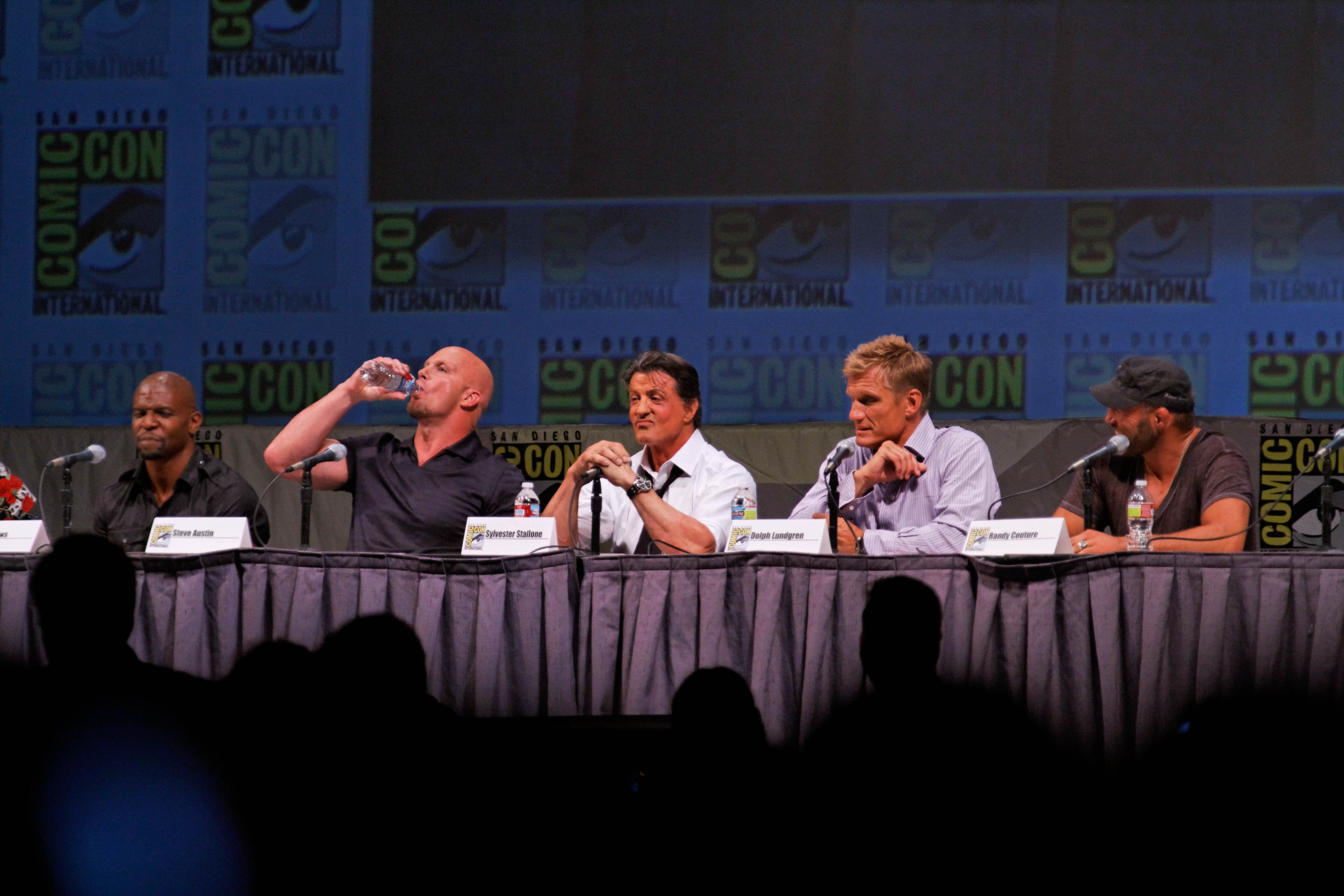
Stallone (center) with the cast of The Expendables at ComicCon 2010

In 2013, Stallone starred in the action film Bullet to the Head, directed by Walter Hill, based upon Alexis Nolent's French graphic novel Du Plomb Dans La Tete. Also in 2013, he starred in the action thriller Escape Plan, along with Arnold Schwarzenegger and Jim Caviezel, and in the sports comedy drama Grudge Match alongside Robert De Niro, harkening back to the Rocky franchise. Stallone was reported to be developing an English-language remake of the Spanish film No Rest for the Wicked, though the project was shelved. That year Stallone was credited as writer for the Jason Statham action film vehicle Homefront.

The Expendables 3, the third installment in the ensemble action film series, was released on August 15, 2014. The returning ensemble cast also added Wesley Snipes, Antonio Banderas, Mel Gibson and Harrison Ford. This film was negatively received by both critics and audiences and became the lowest-grossing film in the series.

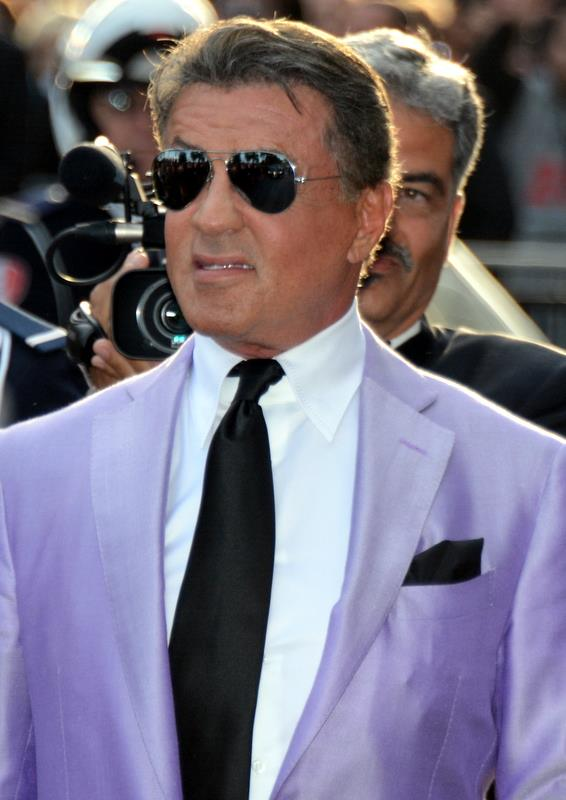
Stallone promoting The Expendables 3 at the 2014 Cannes Film Festival

In 2015, Stallone reprised his role as Rocky Balboa in a spin-off-sequel film, Creed, which focused on Adonis "Donnie" Creed, the son of his deceased friend/rival, Apollo Creed, becoming a professional boxer, played by Michael B. Jordan. The film, directed by Ryan Coogler, received critical acclaim. Portraying the iconic cinematic boxer for the seventh time in a span of 40 years, Stallone's portrayal of the character received widespread acclaim and accolades, including the Golden Globe Award for Best Supporting Actor, and his third Academy Award nomination, this time for Best Supporting Actor.

In 2017, Stallone appeared in Guardians of the Galaxy Vol. 2 as Stakar Ogord / Starhawk, the leader of a Ravagers faction. In 2018, he co-starred in Escape Plan 2: Hades with Dave Bautista which was released straight to home-video. Upon wrapping production, he announced via his social media page that work on the third movie titled Escape Plan: The Extractors, began immediately thereafter. In July, Stallone announced that he had finished a script for a sequel to Creed, with a plot including the return of Ivan Drago from Rocky IV. That year, Stallone was featured in Derek Wayne Johnson's John G. Avildsen: King of the Underdogs, a documentary about director John G. Avildsen.

Creed II went into production in March 2018, with a scheduled release on Thanksgiving 2018. Stallone was originally slated to direct before the appointment of Steven Caple Jr., in his feature film directorial debut. Creed II was released in the United States by Metro-Goldwyn-Mayer on November 21, 2018. The film received generally positive reviews from critics and it went on to debut to $35.3 million in its opening weekend (a five-day total of $55.8 million), marking the biggest debut ever for a live-action release over Thanksgiving.

On July 23, 2019, in an interview with Variety, Stallone said that a Rocky sequel and prequel are in development. Producer Irwin Winkler said "We're very high on it" and that negotiations are underway for Stallone to write and star in the feature. "We're very anxious to make it." Stallone said the plot of the film would be about Rocky befriending a young fighter who is an undocumented immigrant. "Rocky meets a young, angry person who got stuck in this country when he comes to see his sister. He takes him into his life, and unbelievable adventures begin, and they wind up south of the border. It's very, very timely." Stallone said. Stallone also said there are "ongoing discussions" about a Rocky prequel television series, which he hopes will land on a streaming service and the series will likely follow a young Rocky Balboa as a professional boxing hopeful. Stallone said producer Irwin Winkler is hesitant on making the series saying that "There was some conflict there, yes. He felt in his mind that "Rocky" was primarily a feature film, and he didn't see it as being translated for cable, so there was a big bone of contention." That year, Stallone hand-picked Derek Wayne Johnson to direct and produce a documentary on the making of the original Rocky, entitled 40 Years of Rocky (2020). The documentary features Stallone narrating behind-the-scenes footage from the making of the film.

Stallone formed a film studio named Balboa Productions with Braden Aftergood in March 2018, where Stallone will serve as co-producer for each of their projects. The studio signed a multi-year collaboration deal with Starlight Culture Entertainment to develop projects for film and television. In May 2018, a fifth installment in the Rambo franchise was announced, and in August 2018, Adrian Grünberg was confirmed as the director. Rambo: Last Blood began filming by September 2018, with a script co-written by Stallone, who also reprised his role as Vietnam War veteran John Rambo. The plot centers around Rambo infiltrating a Mexican drug cartel to rescue a family friend's daughter. The film, which was released on September 20, 2019, in the United States, grossed $18.9 million in its opening weekend, the best debut of the franchise. The film grossed $91 million worldwide against a production budget of $50 million.

In late 2020, Stallone lent his voice as Rambo to the fighting video game Mortal Kombat 11, as part of the game's 2nd Kombat Pack. In 2021, he voiced King Shark in the DC Extended Universe film The Suicide Squad. In 2022, Stallone starred in Samaritan, a dark interpretation of the superhero genre, from a script written by Bragi Schut. In November 2022, Stallone made his streaming television debut in Tulsa King, in which he plays a Mafia boss. The 9-episode series was created by Taylor Sheridan and Terence Winter and premiered on Paramount+. A second season premiered on September 15, 2024, with a third season set to premiere in 2026.

In May 2023, Stallone and his immediate family (wife and three daughters) starred in a reality television series The Family Stallone. Seven days after launch, the series was renewed for a second season. That same month, Stallone reprised his role as Stakar Ogord in Guardians of the Galaxy Vol. 3. Sly, a documentary film about Stallone by Thom Zimny, premiered as the closing film of the 2023 Toronto International Film Festival.

In October 2023, he reprised role as Barney Ross in Expend4bles, which was a critical and commercial failure, surpassing The Expendable 3 to become the lowest-grossing film in the franchise.

==== Upcoming projects ====
Following the releases of Creed II and Rambo V: Last Blood, Balboa Productions has had an extensive production slate. A film depicting the life of Jack "Galveston Giant" Johnson, the first African-American boxing heavyweight champion, is in development. The project was announced after Stallone's instrumental involvement in helping get Johnson a posthumous pardon from US President Donald Trump.

Stallone is also scheduled to star in the film adaptation of Hunter, a story which had originally been planned as the premise for Rambo V: Last Blood. The story centers around Nathaniel Hunter, a professional tracker who is hired to hunt a half-human beast created as an experiment of a secret agency. A feature-length adaptation of the biographical novel Ghost: My Thirty Years as an FBI Undercover Agent by Michael McGowan and Ralph Pezzullo about McGowan's career of over 50 undercover missions will follow, though there is no screenwriter attached to the project. Additionally, a film centered around black ops troops, being written by retired Army Ranger Max Adams, is also in development. Stallone wrote A Working Man in collaboration with David Ayer from a book series created by Chuck Dixon, which was initially intended to be a television series, but later became a feature film starring Jason Statham. The television production slate includes a series adaptation of Charles Sailor's Second Son being written by Rob Williams.

In May 2020, Stallone announced that a sequel to 1993's Demolition Man is in the works: "I think it's coming. We're working on it right now with Warner Brothers. It's looking fantastic. So, that should come out, that's going to happen". Stallone has continued to express his passion in directing a film based on Edgar Allan Poe's life, a script he has been preparing for years. He has also mentioned that he would like to adapt Nelson DeMille's novel The Lion's Game.

In March 2026, it was announced by TMZ that Stallone and Quentin Tarantino would co-direct and co-write a 6-part miniseries featuring gangsters, showgirls, boxing, and music. The series is set to be shot in black and white, using 1930s cameras.

== Multiple tasks in media ==
In 1977, for the first Rocky, Stallone became the third man in history to receive the two nominations for best actor and best screenplay, after Charlie Chaplin and Orson Welles. Stallone is known for his recurring roles as Rocky Balboa, John Rambo, and Barney Ross. Stallone wrote and starred in all of six Rocky films, while directing four of the sequels. Stallone starred in and co-wrote the five films of the Rambo franchise and also directed the fourth one. Stallone wrote, directed, and took the lead role in the first installment of The Expendables films. Stallone directed, wrote, and starred in Paradise Alley. John Travolta starred in Staying Alive, a sequel of Saturday Night Fever, which Stallone wrote and directed. Stallone wrote and starred in Cobra, and Driven. Stallone co-wrote and starred in F.I.S.T., Rhinestone, Over the Top, Cliffhanger, and Creed II.

Asked in February 2008 which of the icons (Rocky or Rambo) he would rather be remembered for, Stallone said "it's a tough one, but Rocky is my first baby, so Rocky." He also stated that Rocky could be interpreted as the "conscious" and Rambo as the "unconscious" of the same character.

Stallone has occasionally sung in his films. He sang "Too Close to Paradise" for Paradise Alley (1978), with the music provided by Bill Conti (who also collaborated with Stallone in prior years, having recorded the famous "Gonna Fly Now" theme for his Academy Award-nominated film, Rocky (1976) which was a U.S. No. 1 hit). In Rocky III (1982), Stallone (as Rocky Balboa) sang "Take Me Back" to his on-screen wife, Adrian (Talia Shire), as they lay in bed. The song was first performed by singer and younger brother, Frank, who had a small role in the original Rocky. For Rhinestone (1984), Stallone sang such songs as "Drinkenstein" as well as duets with his co-star, and actual country music star, Dolly Parton. He also performed two songs when he guest-starred on The Muppet Show in the 1980s, at the height of his career. The last time Stallone sang in a film was in Grudge Match (2013) when he and Robert De Niro performed "The Star-Spangled Banner" together.

== Style and reception ==
Stallone is known for his raw portrayals of vulnerable, working-class characters, he is considered a leading actor of the 1980s. Regarded as an icon of action cinema, Stallone is credited with helping redefine the Hollywood action hero. Stallone held on to control of the production rights of Rocky until he was cast in the starring role. In 1977, he became the third actor in history to be nominated for two Academy Awards for Best Original Screenplay and Best Actor. He has occasionally ventured from the action genre, with mixed results. He starred in the comedies Oscar (1991) and Stop! Or My Mom Will Shoot (1992); the first film failed at the box office but the second one had modest success. He also starred in the 1997 drama Cop Land, for which he temporarily shed his sculpted physique and gained weight for his role as a powerless sheriff. At the height of his career, Stallone was known for his rivalry with Arnold Schwarzenegger. He is also, along with Harrison Ford, one of two actors in history to have starred in a box office number-one film across six consecutive decades.

== Personal life ==
=== Marriages and children ===
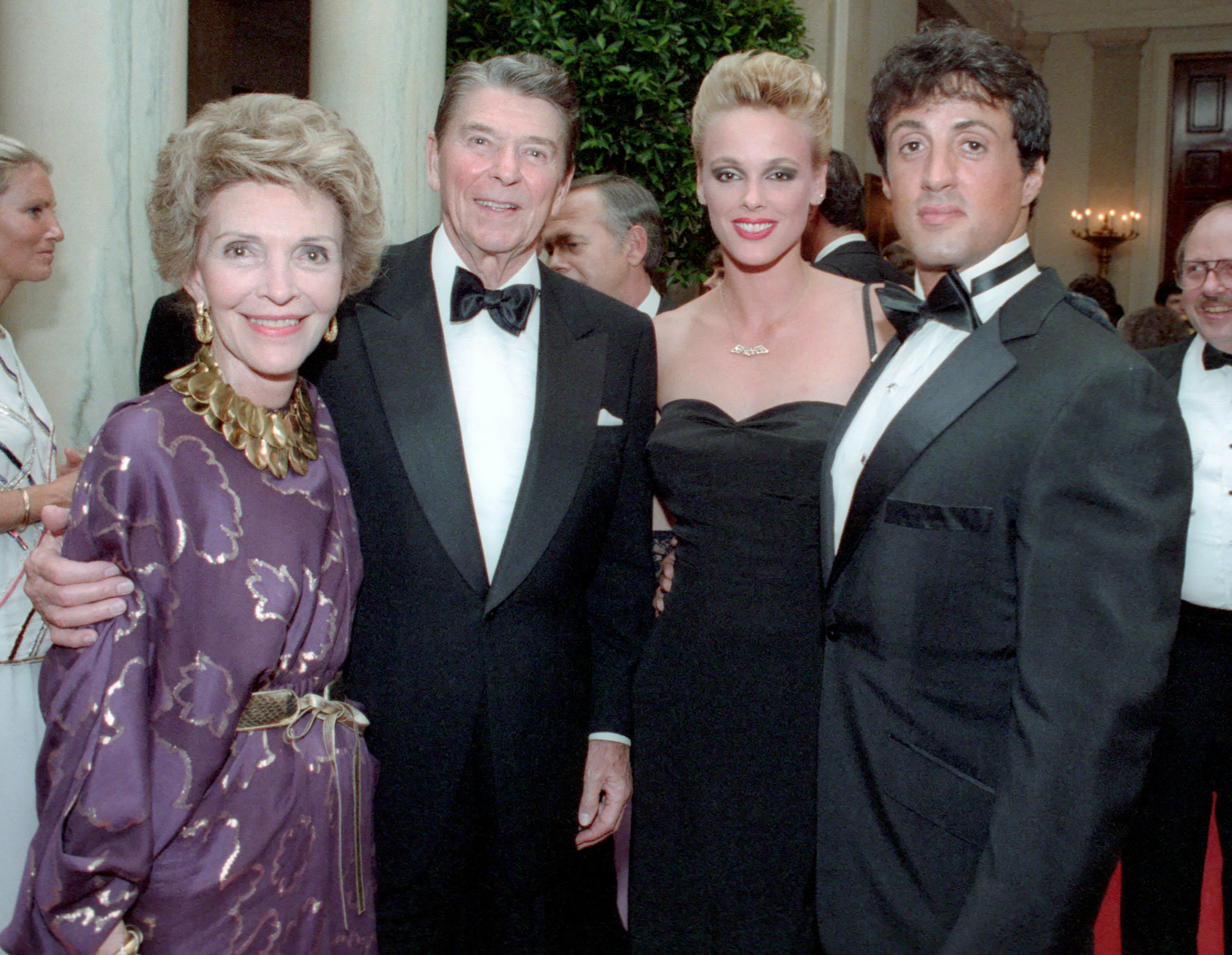
Stallone (right) with Brigitte Nielsen (2nd from right), President Ronald Reagan, and First Lady Nancy Reagan at the White House in 1985

Stallone has been married three times. He has two sons from his first marriage and three daughters from his third marriage.

At age 28, on December 28, 1974, he married Sasha Czack. They had two sons, Sage Moonblood Stallone (1976–2012), who died of heart disease at age 36, and Seargeoh (b. 1979), who was diagnosed with autism at an early age. Seargeoh also made a cameo as Rocky Balboa's son in Rocky II as an infant. The couple divorced on February 14, 1985.

Stallone married model and actress Brigitte Nielsen on December 15, 1985, in Beverly Hills, California. The marriage lasted two years and the subsequent divorce was highly publicized by the tabloid press.

In 1988, Stallone met model Jennifer Flavin and they were in a relationship until 1994, when Stallone told her he was having a child with model Janice Dickinson. After the February 1994 birth, DNA tests confirmed he was not the father and Stallone ended his engagement to Dickinson. After a brief 1995 engagement with model Angie Everhart, he and Flavin rekindled their relationship.

In May 1997, Stallone and Jennifer Flavin married. The couple has three daughters, Sophia, Sistine, and Scarlet. His daughters were chosen to share the role of Golden Globe Ambassador at the 74th Golden Globe Awards. On August 19, 2022, Palm Beach County records showed that after 25 years of marriage, Jennifer Flavin had filed for "dissolution of marriage and other relief". On September 23, 2022, the couple reconciled.

=== Family and friends ===
Stallone maintains a relationship with his brother Frank who contributed the theme songs to Rambo: First Blood Part II, and Staying Alive. In 1983, Frank's song "Far from Over", for Staying Alive, reached the No. 10 U.S. hit. Frank appears in minor roles, bit parts, and provides music in many films starring Sylvester, most notably in the Rocky films, where Frank played a street corner singer and contributed songs. Stallone's 48-year-old half-sister, Toni Ann Filiti, died of lung cancer on August 26, 2012. Stallone was a close friend of Joe Spinell, but they had a falling out during the shooting of their final collaboration, Nighthawks, in 1981, and Spinell died in 1989.

=== Injuries ===
Known for physically demanding roles and his willingness to do the majority of his own stunts, Stallone has suffered various injuries during his acting career. During the filming of Escape to Victory, he broke a finger trying to save a penalty kick against Pelé. For a scene in Rocky IV, he told Dolph Lundgren, "Punch me as hard as you can in the chest." He later said, "Next thing I know, I was in intensive care at St. John's Hospital for four days. It's stupid!" While filming a fight scene with "Stone Cold" Steve Austin for The Expendables, he broke his neck and required the insertion of a metal plate.

=== Legal issues ===
In February 2001, an exotic dancer named Margie Carr filed a lawsuit against Stallone, accusing him of rape while at a Santa Monica fitness center where they both worked out on February 26, 2000. A lawyer for Stallone denied the claim, saying she sold the story to Globe the month before the lawsuit.

In 2007, customs officials in Australia discovered 48 vials of the synthetic human growth hormone Jintropin in Stallone's luggage. In a court hearing on May 15, he pleaded guilty to two charges of possessing a controlled substance.

In 2013, it was reported that Stallone paid a $2 million lump-sum settlement alongside a monthly amount and a trust for psychiatric and medical expenses to his half-sister Toni-Ann Filiti in 1987. Filiti threatened to file a lawsuit accusing him of abuse. Representatives for Stallone and Filiti's mother Jacqueline Stallone denied the allegations, accusing Filiti of blackmailing him and being a drug addict. However, Filiti's son, Edd Filiti, supported the claims, saying his mother "screamed about" abuse at the hands of her half-brother "over and over," before her death in 2012.

In 2016, a report from the Las Vegas Metropolitan Police Department was published stating that Stallone was accused of sexual assault by a 16-year-old girl while he was shooting a film in Las Vegas in 1986. The teen reportedly said that Stallone, then 40, forced her into a threesome with his bodyguard. A representative for Stallone denied the allegation. Stallone's ex-wife, Brigitte Nielsen, later came to his defense, saying that she was with him at the time of the alleged assault. Stallone's Over the Top costar David Mendenhall also defended Stallone, denying claims that he introduced Stallone to the girl in question.

In November 2017, a woman accused Stallone of sexually assaulting her at his Santa Monica office in the early 1990s. Stallone denied the claim. His attorney revealed the accuser filed a report after an entertainment website declined to pick up the story. Stallone's attorneys also stated that while the actor had a consensual relationship with the accuser in 1987, they had two witnesses who refuted the claims. In June 2018, the Los Angeles District Attorney's office confirmed an investigation, stating that the Santa Monica Police Department had presented a sex crimes case against Stallone to a special prosecution task force for review. In October 2018, the Los Angeles District Attorney's office made the decision not to charge Stallone for the alleged assault, as no witnesses corroborated the allegations. Stallone in turn filed a police report regarding her lying on an official document.

=== Religious views ===
Stallone was baptized and raised a devout Catholic but stopped going to church as his acting career progressed. He rediscovered his childhood faith when his daughter was born ill in 1996, and he again became a strict Catholic by late 2006. The same year, he was interviewed by Pat Robertson from the Christian Broadcasting Network's 700 Club. He stated that he spent much of his previous time in Hollywood "losing his way" because temptation abounded, but later put things "in God's hands". However, he told GQ magazine in 2010, "I'm pretty spiritual; I believe a lot in the spirit of man. I'm certainly not an atheist ... I was baptized Catholic, but I don't belong to a structured church. I have no opposition to it. I think there's great nuggets of knowledge in there, some wonderful rules to live by. Then the flip side is the amount of agony that's caused." In 2015, upon the advice of a Vedic scholar, Stallone performed a Hindu Tithi Shradh ritual (done for those who died by accident or murder) at Haridwar for his son Sage. As of 2023, Stallone is a churchgoing Catholic again.

=== Politics ===
Stallone has supported several Republican politicians but does not identify as a member of the Republican Party. He has also donated to the Democratic National Committee and to Democrats, including Senators Joe Biden and Chris Dodd. He is a staunch advocate of gun control despite his otherwise conservative views, and has been described as "the most anti-gun celebrity in Hollywood". In 1994, Stallone donated $1,000 to Republican Congressman Rick Santorum's Senate campaign. In 2008, Stallone endorsed John McCain for that year's presidential election.

Stallone expresses support for recognition of the Armenian genocide. He attended the 2017 film premiere for The Promise, a movie set during the genocide.

In the run-up to the 2016 presidential election, Stallone described Donald Trump as a "Dickensian character" and "larger than life" but did not endorse Trump or anyone else in the Republican primaries. That same year, he declined an offer to become Chair of the National Endowment for the Arts, citing a desire to work on issues related to veterans. In 2023, Stallone donated $11,600 to independent Senator Kyrsten Sinema's re-election campaign in Arizona. Later that year, he and his family spent time with Pope Francis in a private meeting at the Vatican. After Trump's win in the 2024 election, Stallone attended an event at Mar-a-Lago. During a speech, Stallone praised Trump as a "mythical character" and the "second George Washington". He also compared him to his character Rocky Balboa.

On January 16, 2025, it was announced by Trump that Stallone would serve in a new role as a Special Ambassador to Hollywood, sharing the role with fellow actors Jon Voight and Mel Gibson. Trump stated that he wants these actors to make Hollywood "stronger than ever before" by bringing back business lost to "foreign countries". In September 2026, Stallone said that he never agreed to the position and was blindsided by Trump's announcement. He recalled telling Trump he would have rejected the appointment if asked.

== Acting credits and accolades ==
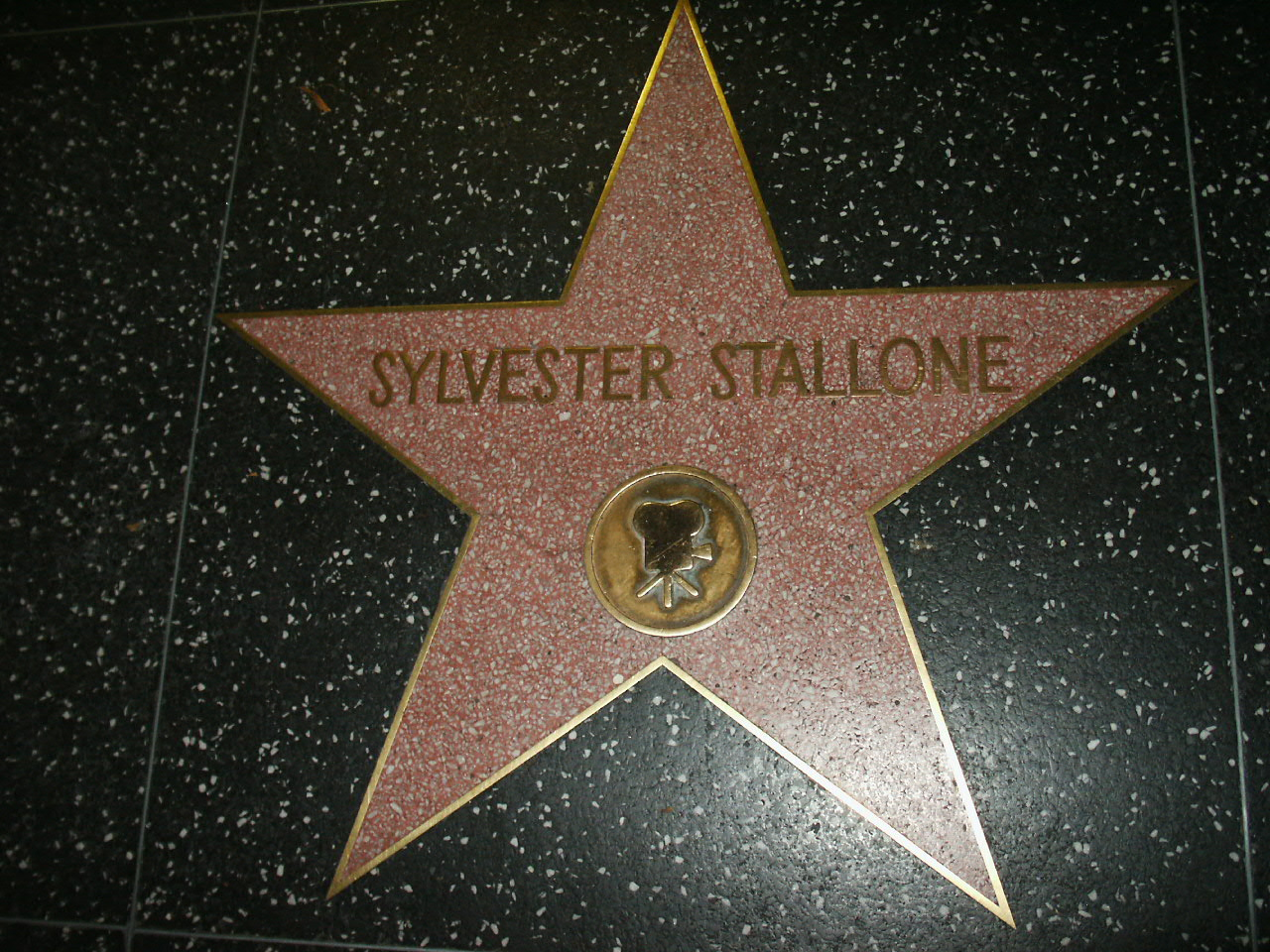
Stallone's star on the Hollywood Walk of Fame

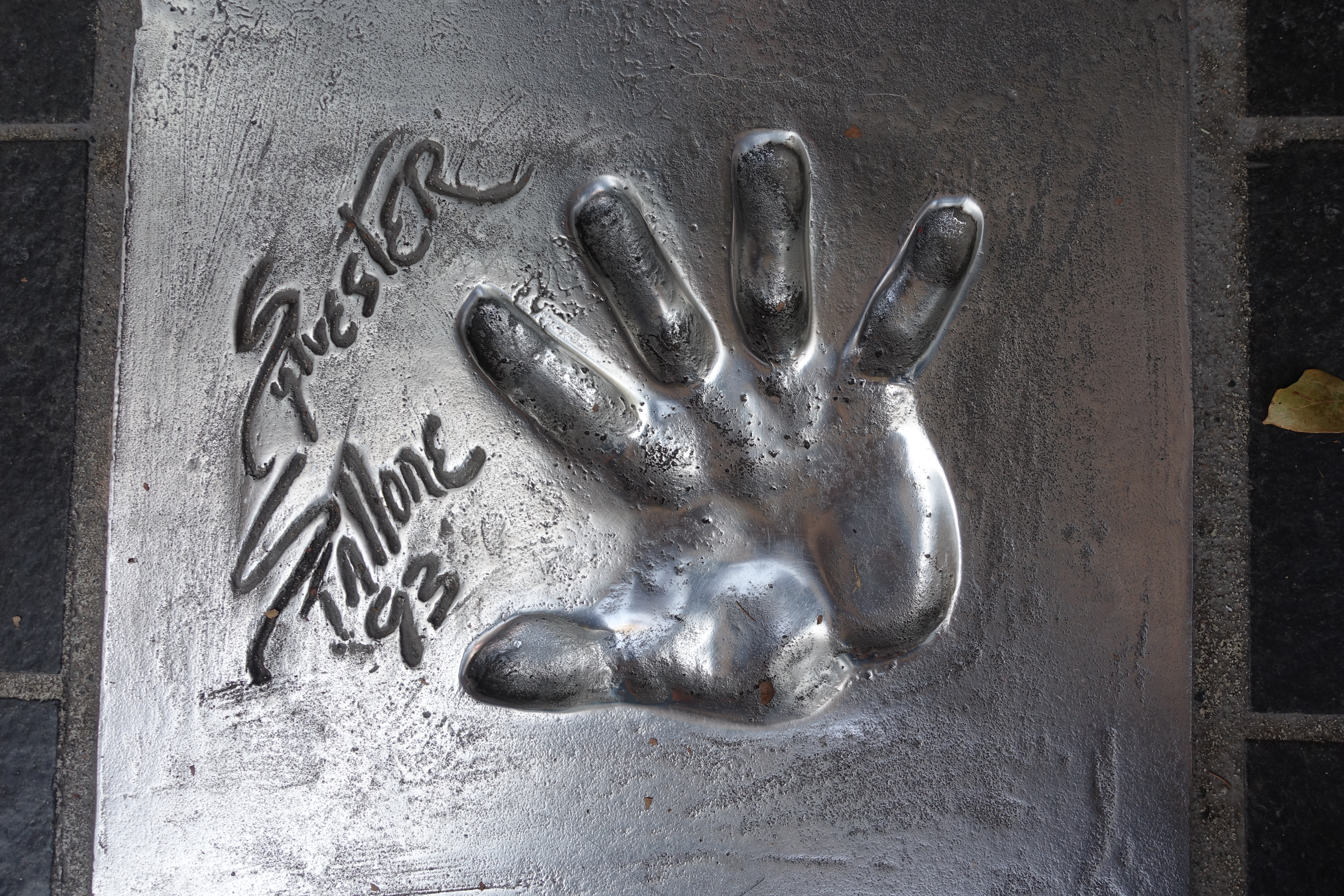
Stallone's handprint in Cannes Chemin des Étoiles

Over the course of his career Stallone has received a Golden Globe Award from three nominations, a Critics' Choice Movie Award, a People's Choice Award, and international prizes from the César Awards, David di Donatello, and the Venice International Film Festival, as well as nominations for three Academy Awards and two BAFTA Awards.

- Star on the Hollywood Walk of Fame (1984)
- International Boxing Hall of Fame (Class of 2010)
- Golden Globe Award for Best Supporting Actor – Motion Picture for Creed (2016)
- Heart of Hollywood Award from the Board of Governors of the Cedars-Sinai Medical Center (2016)

== Bibliography ==
- The Official Rocky Scrapbook. New-York: Grosset & Dunlap. 1977. ISBN 0-44-814432-8
- Sly Moves. New-York: HarperCollins. 2005. ISBN 0-06-073787-5
