= Derek Wayne Johnson =

American film director

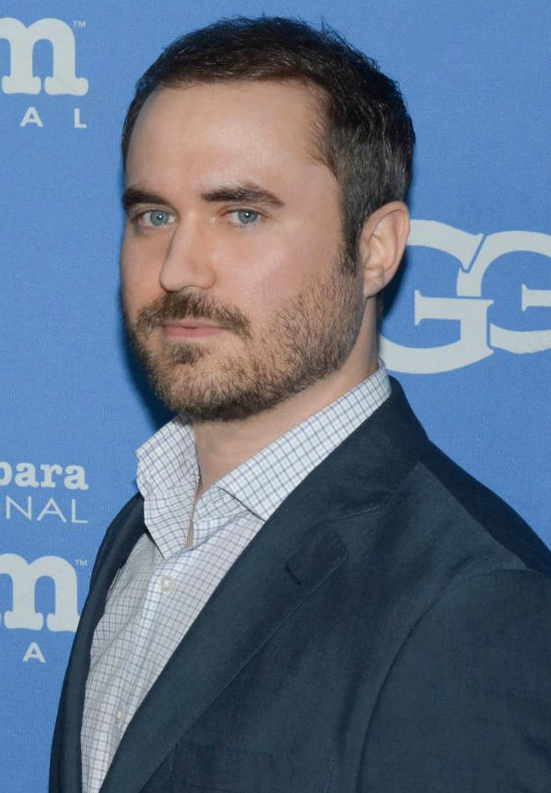
- Johnson at the Santa Barbara International Film Festival in 2017
- Born: February 23, 1983 (age 43); Carthage, Texas, U.S.
- Education: Stephen F. Austin State University (MA)
- Occupations: Director, screenwriter, editor and producer
- Notable work: John G. Avildsen: King of the Underdogs (2017); 40 Years of Rocky: The Birth of a Classic (2020); Stallone: Frank, That Is (2021)

Derek Wayne Johnson (born February 23, 1983) is an American film director, screenwriter, editor and producer.

== Early life and education ==
Born and raised in Carthage, Texas, Johnson began making short films at an early age, winning several awards while still in high school. Johnson directed his first feature film, Within Us, in his senior year of film school at Stephen F. Austin State University. He graduated with a Master of Arts in film.

== Career ==
=== Acting and Directing ===
After college, Johnson tried his hand at acting, starring in independent films and appearing in theatrically released and made-for-TV movies. Deciding to forgo acting and focus solely on filmmaking, he directed three feature films in Texas and Louisiana, including Broken Blood and Scrape, before landing in California.

=== Documentaries ===
Upon arriving in Hollywood, Johnson directed John G. Avildsen: King of the Underdogs, about the Academy Award-winning director whose credits include Rocky and The Karate Kid. The documentary features interviews with Sylvester Stallone, Ralph Macchio, Martin Scorsese, Talia Shire, Burt Reynolds and many more. Alongside John Avildsen and the cast and crew of The Karate Kid, Johnson received a Commendation by the City of Los Angeles for his documentary and its association with The Karate Kid legacy. In 2022, Johnson and his documentary were mentioned in Ralph Macchio‘s New York Times Bestselling book Waxing On: The Karate Kid and Me.

Sylvester Stallone hand-picked Johnson to direct 40 Years of Rocky: The Birth of a Classic. The documentary, narrated by Stallone, details the making of Rocky and was acquired by Metro-Goldwyn-Mayer (MGM). Johnson and his documentary were mentioned in the 2021 Life magazine special issue dedicated to the Rocky franchise.

Johnson directed Stallone: Frank, That Is, highlighting musician and actor Frank Stallone, brother of Sylvester. The documentary features interviews with Sylvester Stallone, Arnold Schwarzenegger, Billy Dee Williams, Duff McKagan, Joe Mantegna and many others.

Sylvester Stallone once again hand-picked Johnson to edit The Making of Rocky vs. Drago, a documentary directed by John Herzfeld and distributed by Metro-Goldwyn-Mayer (MGM).

=== Return to Feature Films ===
Recently, Johnson wrapped production on his directorial return to feature films with Blood Streams, a crime/drama/thriller starring Han Soto, Brad Maule, Hollin Haley, and Yuji Okumoto. The film was shot entirely in Panola County, Texas and will see a worldwide release.

== Personal life ==
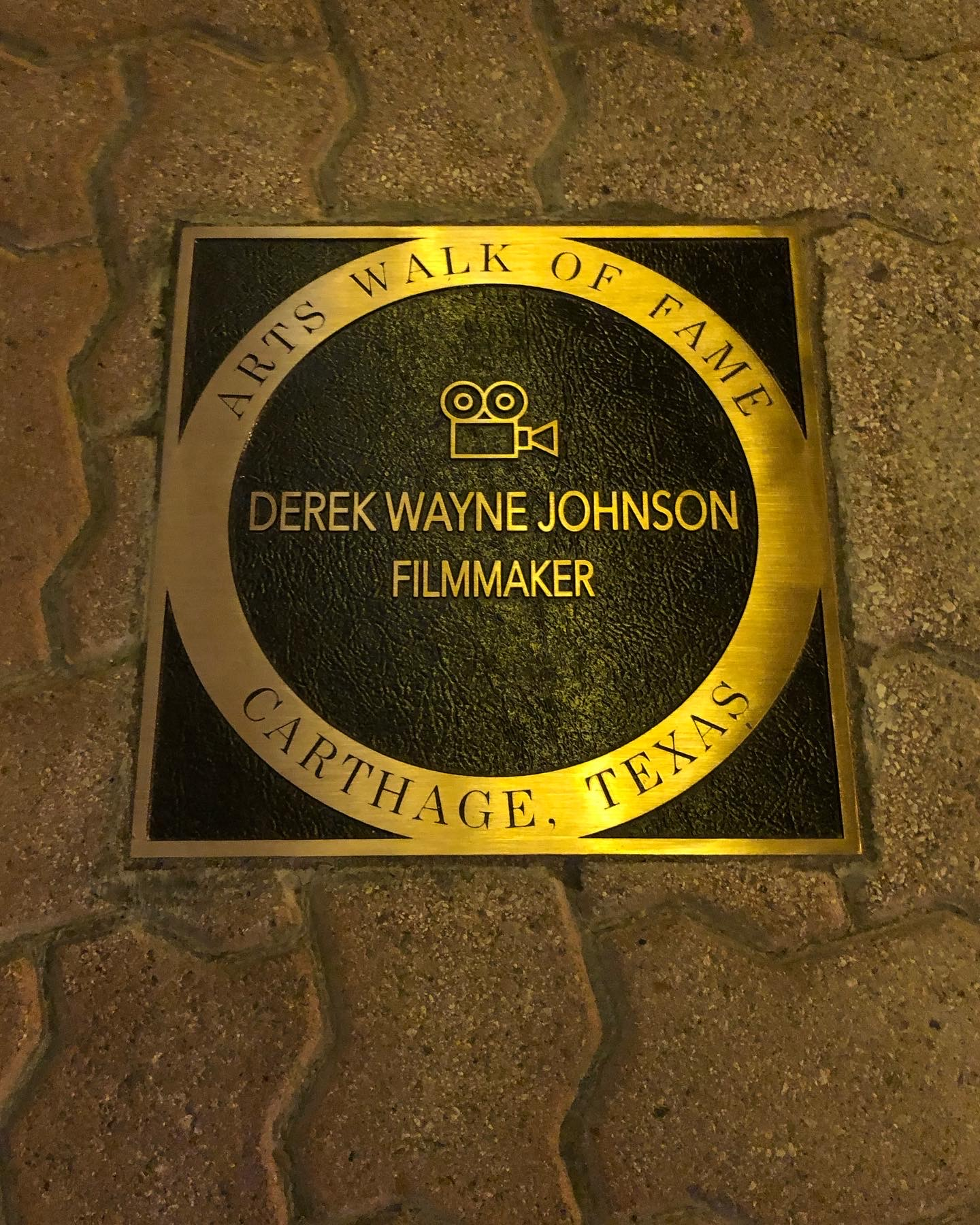
Johnson's plaque on the Carthage Main Street Arts Walk of Fame

On February 18, 2022, Johnson received a “star” in downtown Carthage, Texas as part of the first class of inductees to the Carthage Main Street Arts Walk of Fame. The plaque is located on the sidewalk outside the historic Esquire Theater. Johnson also received a Key to the City of Carthage, presented by the Mayor.

Johnson cites his original VHS copy of Raiders of the Lost Ark as the reason he became a filmmaker, calling it "the holy grail" of his movie collection and the film he studied the most growing up.

Johnson is a lifelong martial artist and 4th degree black belt in American Karate and 4th degree black belt in the Superfoot System under Bill “Superfoot” Wallace. In 2020, he was inducted into the AMAA Who's Who in the Martial Arts Hall of Fame.
