= Sage Stallone =

American actor (1976–2012)

- Stallone at the premiere of Rocky Balboa in 2006
- Born: Sage Moonblood Stallone; May 5, 1976; Los Angeles, California, U.S.
- Died: July 13, 2012 (aged 36); Studio City, California, U.S.
- Resting place: Westwood Village Memorial Park Cemetery, Westwood Village, California, U.S.
- Education: Montclair Preparatory School
- Alma mater: North Carolina School of the Arts
- Occupations: Actor; filmmaker
- Years active: 1990–2010
- Father: Sylvester Stallone
- Relatives: Frank Stallone Sr. (grandfather); Jackie Stallone (grandmother); Frank Stallone (uncle); Sistine Stallone (half-sister)

Sage Moonblood Stallone (May 5, 1976 – July 13, 2012) was an American actor. He was the eldest child of actor Sylvester Stallone. He made his acting debut alongside his father in Rocky V (1990).

== Early life ==
Sage Stallone was born May 5, 1976 in Los Angeles, California, the elder son and first child of Sasha Czack and actor Sylvester Stallone. He was the brother of Seargeoh "Seth" Stallone, and half-brother of Sophia, Sistine, and Scarlet Stallone. He was the nephew of actor and singer Frank Stallone, and grandson of Jackie Stallone. He was the stepson of model and entrepreneur Jennifer Flavin.

Stallone graduated from Montclair College Preparatory School in Van Nuys, California, in 1993, and then studied filmmaking for a year at the University of North Carolina School of the Arts.

== Career ==
Sage Stallone's first television appearance was on the May 21, 1982 episode of The Tonight Show Starring Johnny Carson.

As a child, Stallone made a guest appearance on Gorgeous Ladies of Wrestling, a series that was promoted by his grandmother, Jackie Stallone.

Stallone made his acting debut alongside his father in Rocky V (1990), the fifth installment of the Rocky franchise, playing Robert Balboa Jr., the onscreen son of his father's title character. He also appeared with his dad in Daylight (1996). He subsequently appeared in low budget exploitation films.

In 1996, Stallone and film editor Bob Murawski co-founded Grindhouse Releasing, a Los Angeles–based company dedicated to the restoration and preservation of exploitation films such as Cannibal Holocaust and Gone with the Pope.

In 2006, he did not reprise his Rocky role in Rocky Balboa because he was working on his own film, Vic, his directorial debut. He also wrote and produced the film, which won the "Best New Filmmaker" award at the 2006 Boston Film Festival.

His last projects were appearances in Vincent Gallo's last two films, Promises Written in Water and The Agent. Both films were shown in main competition at the 2010 Venice Film Festival and in the Toronto International Film Festival. A photograph of Stallone as a young child beside his father appears in the 2015 film Creed, where it is stated that his character, Robert Balboa Jr., has since moved away to Vancouver.

== Death ==
Stallone was found dead on July 13, 2012, at his home in Studio City, Los Angeles. He was 36 years old. According to reports, he had not been heard from for four days prior to his death. An autopsy by the Los Angeles coroner and toxicology tests determined that Stallone died of coronary artery disease caused by atherosclerosis, with no drugs detected other than hydrocodone which had been prescribed after a dental procedure. However, Stallone was a very heavy smoker. At the time of his death, Stallone was reportedly engaged. Stallone's funeral was held on July 21 at St. Martin of Tours Catholic Church in Los Angeles. He is interred at Westwood Village Memorial Park Cemetery.

== Filmography ==
Year	Title	Role	Notes
1990	Rocky V	Robert Balboa, Jr.	
1993	Fatally Yours	Leo	
1996	Daylight	Vincent	
1997	The Manson Family	Jay Sebring (voice)	
1997	American Hero	Price	
2002	Reflections of Evil	Dan August	
2005	Chaos	Swan	
2005	Alan Yates	Himself	Director, co-producer
2006	Vic	Doc	Short film Writer, director, producer
2006	Moscow Zero	Vassily	
2007	Oliviero Rising	Dr. Stephens	
2010	Promises Written in Water	The Mafioso	
2010	Gone with the Pope	No	Producer
2010	The Agent	Ari Sheinwold	Short film Final film role
