= 40 Years of Rocky: The Birth of a Classic =

2020 American short documentary film

- Film poster
- Directed by: Derek Wayne Johnson
- Written by: Derek Wayne Johnson
- Based on: Rocky
- Produced by: Derek Wayne Johnson; Chris May; Emmett James
- Starring: Sylvester Stallone; Talia Shire; Burt Young; Burgess Meredith; Carl Weathers
- Narrated by: Sylvester Stallone
- Music by: Greg Sims
- Production company: Cinema 83
- Distributed by: MGM/Epix; Branded Studios; Virgil Films
- Release date: June 9, 2020
- Running time: 30 minutes
- Country: United States
- Language: English

40 Years of Rocky: The Birth of a Classic, also known as Becoming Rocky: The Birth of a Classic, is a 2020 American short documentary film directed by Derek Wayne Johnson about the making of the original Rocky.

== Story ==
The film tells the story of Sylvester Stallone and the creation of the first Rocky film when he was an unknown actor. Sylvester Stallone narrates as he takes the audience through rare, never-before-seen home movies, rehearsal footage, and behind-the-scenes footage, offering insight into how the low-budget fan favorite was made.

== Cast ==
Stallone narrates the film with archive footage starring the Rocky cast, including Talia Shire, Burt Young, Carl Weathers and Burgess Meredith.

== Production ==
Talking about the making of the film, Johnson describes how the series of events conspired that meant he was hand picked by Stallone to create this documentary.

== Distribution ==
40 Years of Rocky: The Birth of a Classic was originally acquired by MGM for their streaming platform Epix, but has also been subsequently released on Transactional Video on Demand platforms Amazon and iTunes in the US and Canada by Virgil Films and as Becoming Rocky: The Birth of a Classic internationally by Branded Studios.
