= The Family Stallone =

2023 American reality television series

- Genre: Reality show
- Starring: Sylvester Stallone; Jennifer Flavin; Sophia Stallone; Sistine Stallone; Scarlet Stallone
- Country of origin: United States
- Original language: English
- No. of seasons: 2
- No. of episodes: 18

Production
- Executive producers: Benjamin Hurvitz; Nadim Amiry
- Running time: 22–26 minutes
- Production companies: Bunim/Murray Productions; MTV Entertainment Studios

Original release
- Network: Paramount+
- Release: May 17, 2023 – February 21, 2024

The Family Stallone is an American reality television series produced by MTV Entertainment Studios and Bunim/Murray Productions. It premiered on Paramount+ on May 17, 2023. On May 24, 2023, it was renewed for a second season, which premiered on February 21, 2024.

== Cast ==
- Sylvester Stallone
- Jennifer Flavin
- Sophia Stallone
- Sistine Stallone
- Scarlet Stallone

== Episodes ==
=== Series overview ===
Season	Episodes	Originally released	
Season	Episodes	First released	Last released
1	8	May 17, 2023	June 28, 2023
2	10	February 21, 2024	

=== Season 1 (2023) ===
No. overall	No. in season	Title	Original release date
1	1	"Meet the Stallones"	May 17, 2023
2	2	"The Currency of Time"	May 17, 2023
3	3	"Leaving the Nest"	May 24, 2023
4	4	"The Show must Go On"	May 31, 2023
5	5	"Unwaxed and Unfiltered"	June 7, 2023
6	6	"The Stallones Go West"	June 14, 2023
7	7	"Green Light Fight"	June 21, 2023
8	8	"Philadelphia Story"	June 28, 2023

=== Season 2 (2024) ===
No. overall	No. in season	Title	Original release date
9	1	"Say Goodbye to Hollywood"	February 21, 2024
10	2	"My Fair Louis"	February 21, 2024
11	3	"Matchmaker, Matchmaker"	February 21, 2024
12	4	"Back Aches and Blind Dates"	February 21, 2024
13	5	"Uncle Frank is Coming to Town"	February 21, 2024
14	6	"Keep Punching"	February 21, 2024
15	7	"A Stallone Family Reunion"	February 21, 2024
16	8	"Citizen Sly"	February 21, 2024
17	9	"When in Rome"	February 21, 2024
18	10	"That's Amore"	February 21, 2024

== Reception ==
On Rotten Tomatoes the first season holds an 89% score.
