= Sistine Stallone =

American actress (born 1998)

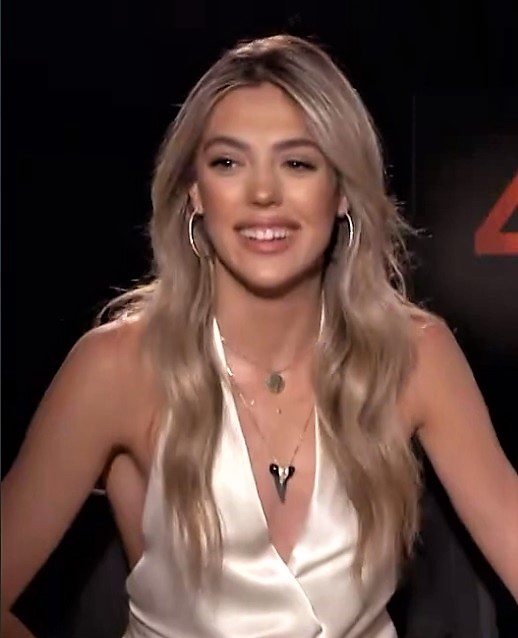
- Stallone in 2019
- Born: Sistine Rose Stallone; June 27, 1998 (age 28); Los Angeles, California, U.S.
- Education: University of Southern California (BA)
- Occupations: Actress; model; internet personality
- Years active: 2016–present
- Height: 1.78 m (5 ft 10 in)
- Parents: Sylvester Stallone (father); Jennifer Flavin (mother)
- Relatives: Sage Stallone (half-brother); Frank Stallone Sr. (grandfather); Jackie Stallone (grandmother); Frank Stallone (uncle)

Sistine Rose Stallone (born June 27, 1998) is an American actress, model and internet personality. She made her acting debut in the 2019 survival horror film 47 Meters Down: Uncaged, directed by Johannes Roberts. She is the daughter of actor Sylvester Stallone.

== Early life and education ==
Sistine Stallone was born in 1998 as the second daughter of actor-director Sylvester Stallone and former model Jennifer Flavin. Stallone and her sisters Sophia and Scarlet were Golden Globe Ambassadors at the 75th Golden Globe Awards in January 2018.

In 2018, she began attending University of Southern California to pursue a degree in communications and has since graduated.

== Career ==
In 2016, she signed to IMG Models, and made her first appearance at a fashion show for Chanel. She appeared in a July 2016 issue of Glamour and was featured on the cover of Elle Russia for November 2017.

In 2023, Sistine Stallone revealed on the reality show The Family Stallone that she was working on the script for a feature film, Scavenger Hunt, a horror film directed by Elle Callahan.

== Filmography ==
Key
†	Denotes films that have not yet been released

=== Film ===
Year	Title	Role	Notes
2019	47 Meters Down: Uncaged	Nicole	Film debut
2021	Midnight in the Switchgrass	Heather	

=== Television ===
Year	Title	Role	Notes
2018	Love Advent	Self	Episode: Sistine Stallone
2023–2024	The Family Stallone	Self	Reality show
