= Frank Stallone Sr. =

Father of Sylvester Stallone (1919–2011)

- Born: Francesco Stallone; September 12, 1919; Gioia del Colle, Italy
- Died: July 11, 2011 (aged 91); Wellington, Florida, U.S.
- Spouses: Jacqueline Labofish (m. 1945; div. 1957) Rose Marie Stallone (divorced) Sandra Stallone (divorced) Kathleen Rhodes (m. 1997)
- Children: 5, including Sylvester and Frank Jr.
- Relatives: Sage Stallone (grandson); Sistine Stallone (granddaughter)

Francesco Stallone Sr. (September 12, 1919 – July 11, 2011) was an Italian and American businessman and the father of actor Sylvester Stallone and musician Frank Stallone Jr. He wrote Stewart Lane which was published in May 2010. He appeared in the 1976 film Rocky as the timekeeper.

== Early life and career ==
Stallone was born in Gioia del Colle, to Silvestro Stallone (1883–1963), a barber, and Pulcheria Nicastri (1890–1973). He was one of eight children. His family moved to New York from Italy in 1923 on board the SS Dante Alighieri sailing from Naples. Stallone served in the US Army during World War II from 1940–1945.

After his return from the service, Stallone opened up several barber shops in New York City. He moved to Washington, D.C., in the early 1950s and then moved to Silver Spring, Maryland, where he opened several more hair salons and beauty schools.

He was a polo enthusiast for more than 70 years, becoming an early member of the Potomac Polo Club, located in Poolesville, Maryland.

Stallone had a short-lived career as an actor and as a writer. His first acting role was in the role of the timekeeper in the 1976 American sports drama Rocky, which starred his son Sylvester. At the age of 90, he wrote his first and only novel, which was published on May 24, 2010. The book, entitled Stewart Lane, was the tale of a couple who attempt to renovate a dilapidated country house.

== Personal life ==
Stallone was married four times. From 1945 to 1957 he was married to Jacqueline (Jackie) Labofish, an astrologer. His second marriage was to Rose Marie Stallone and ended in divorce. His third marriage was to Sandra Stallone and also ended in divorce. His fourth and final marriage was to Kathleen Rhodes and lasted from 1997 until his death.

Stallone had five children, including Sylvester Stallone and Frank Jr. with Jackie, and a son and daughter with Rose Marie; and a son, Dante, with Kathleen. Among his grandchildren are Sage and Sistine Stallone.

== Death ==
Stallone died on July 11, 2011, at his home in Wellington, Florida, at the age of 91, after a battle with prostate cancer.

His memorial was held on September 12 at Saint Rita's Church in Wellington, Florida.

== Filmography ==
=== Film ===
Year	Title	Role	Notes
1976	Rocky	Timekeeper	

=== Television ===
Year	Title	Role	Notes
1992	The Fifth Corner	Unknown	episode: Woman at Her Toilette
