= Jackie Stallone =

Mother of Sylvester Stallone (1921–2020)

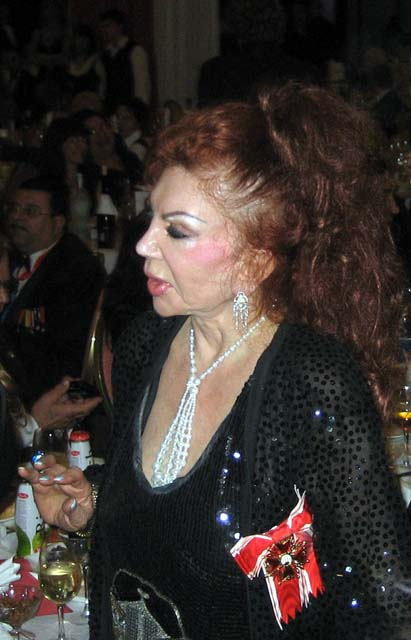
- Stallone in Kyiv on May 17, 2008
- Born: Jacqueline Frances Labofish; November 29, 1921; Washington, D.C., U.S.
- Died: September 21, 2020 (aged 98); Los Angeles, California, U.S.
- Occupations: Astrologer; dancer; promoter; businesswoman
- Spouses: Frank Stallone Sr. (m. 1945; div. 1957) Anthony Filiti (m. 1959, divorced) Stephen Levine (m. 1998)
- Children: 3, including Sylvester and Frank
- Relatives: Sage Stallone (grandson); Sistine Stallone (granddaughter)

Jacqueline Frances Stallone (née Labofish; November 29, 1921 – September 21, 2020) was an American astrologer, dancer and wrestling promoter. She was the mother of actor Sylvester Stallone, singer Frank Stallone, and actress Toni D'Alto, the last by her second husband Anthony Filiti.

== Early life ==
Jacqueline Frances Labofish was born on November 29, 1921, in Washington, D.C., the older of two girls. Her father, John Paul Labofish (1891–1956), was a Washington lawyer. Her mother, Jeanne Victoria Anne "Adrienne" Clerec (1901–1974), was Breton. Her parents had met while her father was serving in the U.S. Navy at Brest (Brittany) after the First World War. Her paternal grandparents, Rose (Lamlec) and Charles Labofisz, were Jewish immigrants from Odesa in the Kherson Governorate of the Russian Empire (now in Ukraine).

Her family lived with body builder Charles Atlas who trained the family in gymnastics, weight lifting, and jogging, when she was a girl.

== Career ==
Stallone was the first woman to have a daily television show on exercise and weight lifting in Washington, D.C., and later opened a women-only gym, named Barbella's. During her youth, Stallone was a trapeze artist in a circus and a chorus girl in a nightclub. She was also a hairdresser. She lived relatively quietly for most of her life. Even after Sylvester starred in the film Rocky in 1976, she remained unknown to the general public.

== Television appearances ==
Stallone appeared on the 1980s wrestling program GLOW: Gorgeous Ladies of Wrestling. Stallone was shown rapping with Americana, Mt. Fiji, and Susie Spirit behind her. She rapped about Aunt Kittie's girls and making them kitty litter. Stallone became famous in her own right during the mid-1990s, by publishing astrology books, making television appearances, and setting up a psychic hotline where she would charge telephone callers for advice from her and other operators. She also invented the term rumpology, which, according to her, is an art similar to that of palm reading except that the procedure is done by examining pictures of people's rear ends. She also claimed that she could consult dogs to find out about the future. She also became involved in the cosmetics industry, launching facial masks and other products that she claimed cured skin problems.

On May 21, 1992, Stallone appeared on The Howard Stern Show and engaged in a heated on-air argument with Sylvester's dad, Frank Stallone Sr. She accused him of being horrible in bed and wanting to have Sylvester aborted. She said that she faked the abortion and that Frank did not know about it until she gave birth. Several curse words were said and some were not censored.

In January 2005, she appeared on the UK TV series Celebrity Big Brother as a "surprise" contestant. She was brought onto the show to create tension within the "house", as her former daughter-in-law Brigitte Nielsen, with whom she notoriously did not get along, was also a contestant. Stallone was the first contestant voted out by viewers after spending four days in the house.

Stallone appeared on BBC TV show Through the Keyhole in March 2007. On the show, Stefanie Powers explored her LA home and then interviewed her.

== In popular culture ==
Her appearance on Celebrity Big Brother 3 in the United Kingdom was parodied on the British TV comedy show French and Saunders, with Dawn French playing Stallone and Jennifer Saunders playing Brigitte Nielsen.

In Absolutely Fabulous, Season 1, Episode 1, entitled "Fashion" (1992), Saffy mistakes £300 worth of royal jelly for honey and eats it on toast, to which Edina says, "This is the stuff, sweetie... Jackie Stallone would kill for this, darling".

In a clip on the TV show Talk Soup, Stallone ate shrimp and a producer dubbed in belches. This caused host Greg Kinnear to laugh uncontrollably on camera.

== Personal life ==
Stallone had three children and seven grandchildren. Her first marriage was to Frank Stallone Sr. which lasted from 1945 to 1957, and produced her two sons, Sylvester and Frank Jr. Her second marriage was to Anthony Filiti in 1959, with whom she had a daughter, the late Toni D'Alto. They later divorced. Her third and final marriage was to Stephen Levine in 1998, and lasted until her death in 2020. Her eldest grandchild Sage Stallone died unexpectedly in 2012. She had another grandson and three granddaughters through eldest son Sylvester, a grandson through Frank, and a grandson through Toni.

== Death ==
Jackie Stallone died on September 21, 2020, at the age of 98. Her death was announced by her son Frank.

== Filmography ==
Year	Title	Role	Notes
1990	Stallone's Knockouts	Judge	TV movie
1993	Beach Babes from Beyond	Yanna	
1996	The Appointment	The 'Mother-In-Law'	
