= Gaudenzio Meneghesso =

Gaudenzio Meneghesso from the University of Padova, Padova, Italy was named Fellow of the Institute of Electrical and Electronics Engineers (IEEE) in 2013 for contributions to the reliability physics of compound semiconductors devices.
