= Jennifer Flavin =

Wife of Sylvester Stallone (born 1968)

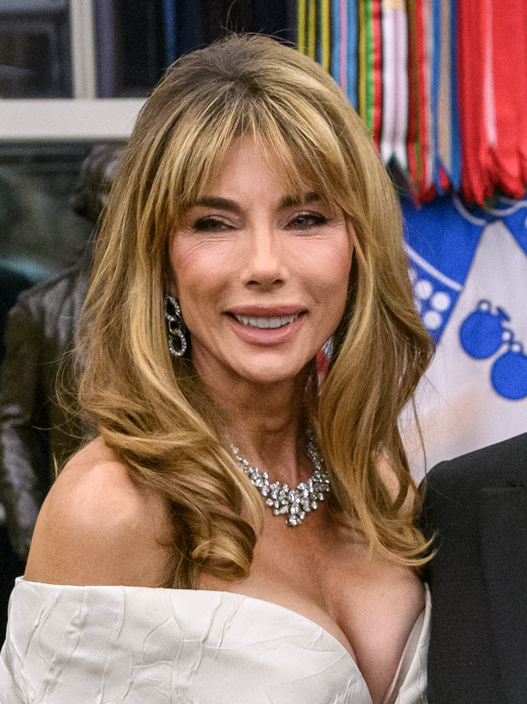
- Flavin in 2025
- Born: Jennifer Lee Flavin; August 14, 1968 (age 57); Los Angeles, California, U.S.
- Occupation: Businesswoman
- Spouse: Sylvester Stallone (m. 1997)
- Children: 3, including Sistine Stallone

Jennifer Lee Flavin Stallone (née Flavin; born August 14, 1968) is an American businesswoman and former model. She is married to actor Sylvester Stallone.

== Early life and career ==
Jennifer Flavin was born in Los Angeles, California, and grew up in West Hills, a district of Los Angeles. She is one of seven children. She had four brothers (Tom, Pat, Shannon, and Mitch) and two sisters. She was 11 years old when her mother became widowed and had to raise all seven of the Flavin children alone.

She graduated from El Camino Real High School in Woodland Hills, another district of Los Angeles; and then she began modeling with the representation of Elite Modeling Agency at the age of 19. She went on to appear as herself in reality shows, including Good Day Live, American Gladiators, and The Contender – a boxing reality television series that also features Stallone. She also made a brief appearance in the 1990 film Rocky V.

At present, she is a co-owner of Serious Skin Care, a company which sells beauty treatments and cosmetics via the home shopping network, ShopHQ.

== Personal life ==
In 1988, Flavin met Sylvester Stallone in California at a Beverly Hills restaurant. They were in a relationship until 1994, when Stallone wrote her a letter saying that he was having an affair with model Janice Dickinson, and that he was the father of her infant daughter. However, after DNA tests had shown that he was not the father, the relationship ended.

Flavin reconciled with Stallone in 1995. They were married on May 17, 1997, in a civil ceremony at The Dorchester Hotel in London, followed by a chapel ceremony at Blenheim Palace in Oxfordshire. They have three daughters, including actress and model Sistine Stallone.

On August 19, 2022, Flavin filed for a divorce from Stallone in the state of Florida. However, on September 23, Flavin and Stallone announced that they had reconciled.

== Filmography ==
Key
†	Denotes films that have not yet been released

=== Film ===
Year	Title	Role	Notes
1990	Bar Girls	Escort Girl	TV movie
1990	Rocky V	Delivery Girl	
TBA	The No Game Gang †		In Development

=== Television ===
Year	Title	Role	Notes
2023	The Family Stallone	Self	Reality show
